= Immortal Songs: Singing the Legend =

South Korean television program

- Promotional poster
- Hangul: 불후의 명곡: 전설을 노래하다
- RR: Bulhuui myeonggok: jeonseoreul noraehada
- MR: Purhuŭi myŏnggok: chŏnsŏrŭl noraehada
- Genre: Music
- Presented by: Shin Dong-yup
- Country of origin: South Korea
- Original language: Korean
- No. of episodes: 781 (Note: In addition to the regular episodes, KBS aired a special on March 3, 2018 that was not counted on the official list. Further, episodes 514, 633, 720-721 only aired in South Korea and English dubbing has not been provided, no official explanation has ever been given.)

Production
- Executive producer: Kwon Yong-taek KBS
- Production location: South Korea
- Running time: 90-100 minutes
- Production company: KBS Entertainment

Original release
- Network: KBS
- Release: June 4 – June 4, 2011
- Release: April 7, 2012 – present

Immortal Songs: Singing the Legend (Korean: 불후의 명곡: 전설을 노래하다), also known as Immortal Songs 2 (불후의 명곡 2), is a South Korean television music competition program presented by Shin Dong-yup. It is a revival of Immortal Songs (2007–2009), and each episode features singers who perform their reinterpreted versions of songs.

The program airs a new episode every Saturday on KBS2, and re-airs it with English subtitles on KBS World a week or two later in the same time frame.

== Synopsis ==
Originally broadcast as Immortal Songs 2 as a part of KBS Saturday Freedom, each episode featured six idol singers who would perform songs by the singer of the episode. After restructuring in 2012, the show returned on April 7 as an independent program and rebranded as Immortal Songs: Singing the Legend. Each episode now features seven singers or groups from diverse backgrounds and years of experience, ranging from members of popular K-pop idol groups to legendary solo artists. As before, they each perform their own reinterpreted versions of famous songs by the legendary singer of the episode. A noted feature of the new format is the "special episodes" which revolve around specific themes, such as festive or commemorate events.

Guest singers are seated in a waiting room with the three hosts, where they introduce themselves to viewers. The order of performances is decided randomly by presenter Shin Dong-yup drawing a ball containing the performer's name, and the 500-member audience vote after each round for their favorite performance. The performer with the most votes on the episode wins. Starting February 15, 2020, due to the COVID-19 pandemic, the votes were done by 20 special judges (mostly KBS employees). They scored the artist, but the score was not shown on screen and instead a light was used to indicate the winner.

Starting August 22, 2020, the show was re-branded as Immortal Songs. Moon Hee-joon & Jung Jae-hyung both left the program after being part of it for 9 & 8 years respectively and it was announced that Kim Jun-hyun and Kim Shin-young would be replacing them. The show's third waiting room host, Kim Tae-woo, left in June 2021 after 3 years. He was replaced by trot singer Shin Yu in July 2021 but he left the show in October and was replaced by a series of guest hosts (see below). Kim Shin-young also left the show in November and Lee Chan-won was named as a permanent host on November 20, 2021.

On November 4, 2021, KBS announced that it will reopen their music shows to a live audience for the first time since January 2020 when the COVID-19 pandemic began. Immortal Songs began taping episodes with a reduced live audience in late November and episode 536 was the first episode to air with an audience on December 11, 2021, with the light system remaining as the method to indicate a winner.

== Cast ==
=== Main MC ===
- Shin Dong-yup (2011–present)

=== Guest MC ===
- Lee Geum-hee (March 19 & 26, 2022)

=== Waiting Room Hosts ===
Current

- Kim Jun-hyun (2020–present)
- Lee Chan-won (2021–present)

Guest

- Tei (Jul. 21, 2018)
- Na Tae-ju (Sept. 18, 2021)
- Park Ji-won (Oct. 9-23, Nov. 6, Nov. 27, Dec. 4, 2021)
- Lee Chan-won (Oct. 30, 2021, later named permanent host)
- Young Tak (Nov. 13, 2021)
- Jang Minho (Nov. 20, 2021, July 9, 2022)
- Ravi (Dec. 11, 2021)
- Jo Woo-jong (Jan. 1, 2022)
- Hoshi (Seventeen) (May 28, 2022)
- Hwang Chi-yeul (June 25, October 8 & 15, 2022)
- Kim Hee-jae (January 21, 2023)
- Jo Min-gyu (Forestella) (July 15 & 22, 2023)
- Park Hyun-bin (August 26, 2023; January 25, 2025)
- Lee Do-hyun (October 5, 2024)
- Park Kyung-lim (March 8, 2025)
- Uhm Ji-in (April 25, 2026)
- Kim Tae-young & Koo Ja-cheol (June 13, 2026)

Former

- Kim Gu-ra (2011–2012)
- Jun Hyun-moo (2012)
- Lee Soo-geun (2012)
- Park Hyun-bin (2013)
- Eun Ji-won (2013–2014)
- Yoon Min-soo (2015–2016)
- Hwang Chi-yeul (2017–2018)
- Moon Hee-joon (2011–2020)
- Jung Jae-hyung (2012–2020)
- Kim Tae-woo (2018–2021)
- Shin Yu (2021)
- Kim Shin-young (2020–2021)

== Records ==
Crossover quartet Forestella holds some unique records in the show:

- The group with the most trophies with 15 victories in total, sharing the top three with solo singers Jung Dong-ha and Ali, with 17 wins respectively.
- Most consecutive wins on the King of Kings special in the show's history, with 7 overall as of July 2026.
- In July 2026, they became the first performers in the 15-year history of the show to achieve an "all-kill" victory twice in the King of Kings special.
- They hold the "Grand Slammer" title since 2020 by achieving "all-kill" victories across all the show's major specials.
- The group had the "undefeated legend" (무패 신화) nickname until March 2026, when rock band Touched broke their winning streak on episode 748.

== Episodes ==
=== 2013 ===
List of episodes aired in 2013

Singers listed in order of performance.

Episode #	Broadcast Date	Legend or Theme	Guest Singers	Songs	Final Winner
82	January 5, 2013	Uhm Jung-hwa	Park Hyun-bin	Festival	IVY
82	January 5, 2013	Uhm Jung-hwa	Yoon Hyung-ryul	A Love Only Heaven Permits	IVY
82	January 5, 2013	Uhm Jung-hwa	Brown Eyed Girls (JeA & Narsha)	Three-Party Encounter	IVY
82	January 5, 2013	Uhm Jung-hwa	Teen Top	Don't Know	IVY
82	January 5, 2013	Uhm Jung-hwa	Cherry Filter	Tell Me	IVY
82	January 5, 2013	Uhm Jung-hwa	UV	Pupil of the Eye	IVY
83	January 12, 2013	Uhm Jung-hwa	Jung Dong-ha	Poison	IVY
83	January 12, 2013	Uhm Jung-hwa	Sweet Sorrow	All Go Away	IVY
83	January 12, 2013	Uhm Jung-hwa	Ivy	Invitation	IVY
83	January 12, 2013	Uhm Jung-hwa	Youme	Rose of Betrayal	IVY
83	January 12, 2013	Uhm Jung-hwa	Son Ho-young	Find the Hidden Picture	IVY
83	January 12, 2013	Uhm Jung-hwa	2BiC	Regret	IVY
84	January 19, 2013	Youth Parade Special (Song Seung-hwan and Wang Young-eun)	Jung Dong-ha	Farewell Trip	Kang Min-kyung
84	January 19, 2013	Youth Parade Special (Song Seung-hwan and Wang Young-eun)	Park Hyun-bin	Kyung Ah	Kang Min-kyung
84	January 19, 2013	Youth Parade Special (Song Seung-hwan and Wang Young-eun)	Infinite H and DJ Koo	You and Only You	Kang Min-kyung
84	January 19, 2013	Youth Parade Special (Song Seung-hwan and Wang Young-eun)	Ivy	Love is Like a Glass	Kang Min-kyung
84	January 19, 2013	Youth Parade Special (Song Seung-hwan and Wang Young-eun)	Yoon Hyung-ryul	A Farewell that is Not Goodbye	Kang Min-kyung
84	January 19, 2013	Youth Parade Special (Song Seung-hwan and Wang Young-eun)	Kang Min-kyung (Davichi)	Missing You	Kang Min-kyung
85	January 26, 2013	Kim Jun-ho	Huh Gak	Little Bird	Nam Hyun-joon & Park Ae-ri
85	January 26, 2013	Kim Jun-ho	Infinite H	Together in the Rain	Nam Hyun-joon & Park Ae-ri
85	January 26, 2013	Kim Jun-ho	Kim Da-hyun	Girl with an Unknown Name	Nam Hyun-joon & Park Ae-ri
85	January 26, 2013	Kim Jun-ho	IVY	White Butterfly (하얀 나비)	Nam Hyun-joon & Park Ae-ri
85	January 26, 2013	Kim Jun-ho	Nam Hyun-joon & Park Ae-ri	As Days Go By	Nam Hyun-joon & Park Ae-ri
85	January 26, 2013	Kim Jun-ho	Jung Dong-ha	Longing Hearts	Nam Hyun-joon & Park Ae-ri
86	February 2, 2013	In Sooni	IVY	Again	ALi
86	February 2, 2013	In Sooni	Daybreak	Weepin' Willow	ALi
86	February 2, 2013	In Sooni	Infinite H	Night After Night	ALi
86	February 2, 2013	In Sooni	Jung Dong-ha	Goose's Dream	ALi
86	February 2, 2013	In Sooni	Ali	Father	ALi
86	February 2, 2013	In Sooni	Narsha (Brown Eyed Girls) & Huh Jae-joon	Dear Friend	ALi
87	February 9, 2013	Lunar New Year Special	Nam Hyun-joon & Park Ae-ri	Mokpo the Harbour	Jung Dong-ha
87	February 9, 2013	Lunar New Year Special	Infinite H	Busan Seagull	Jung Dong-ha
87	February 9, 2013	Lunar New Year Special	Huh Gak	Teary Dumangang	Jung Dong-ha
87	February 9, 2013	Lunar New Year Special	Jung Dong-ha	Seoul's Affection	Jung Dong-ha
87	February 9, 2013	Lunar New Year Special	IVY	Soyanggang Girl	Jung Dong-ha
87	February 9, 2013	Lunar New Year Special	Narsha (Brown Eyed Girls)	Daejeon Blues	Jung Dong-ha
88	February 16, 2013	Kim Min-jong	Youme	Under the Sky	Daybreak
88	February 16, 2013	Kim Min-jong	Jung Dong-ha	At the End of the World	Daybreak
88	February 16, 2013	Kim Min-jong	Alex	Feeling You	Daybreak
88	February 16, 2013	Kim Min-jong	Narsha (Brown Eyed Girls)	Kind Love	Daybreak
88	February 16, 2013	Kim Min-jong	Daybreak	With You	Daybreak
88	February 16, 2013	Kim Min-jong	IVY	Beautiful Pain	Daybreak
89	February 23, 2013	Yim Jae-beom	Youme & Park Wan-kyu	Scar Deeper than Love	Kim Tae-woo
89	February 23, 2013	Yim Jae-beom	Shin Yong-jae (4Men)	For You	Kim Tae-woo
89	February 23, 2013	Yim Jae-beom	Daybreak	If This Night Passes	Kim Tae-woo
89	February 23, 2013	Yim Jae-beom	Jung Dong-ha	The Fight	Kim Tae-woo
89	February 23, 2013	Yim Jae-beom	Illac	Turn Up the Radio	Kim Tae-woo
89	February 23, 2013	Yim Jae-beom	Kim Tae-woo	Confession	Kim Tae-woo
90	March 2, 2013	Moon Joo-ran	Nam Hyun-joon & Park Ae-ri	Airport Farewell	Wax
90	March 2, 2013	Moon Joo-ran	IVY	Windmill that Doesn't Spin	Wax
90	March 2, 2013	Moon Joo-ran	Daybreak	The Road when it Drizzles	Wax
90	March 2, 2013	Moon Joo-ran	Narsha (Brown Eyed Girls)	Dongsuk's Song	Wax
90	March 2, 2013	Moon Joo-ran	Mir & Seungho	Men Annoy Women	Wax
90	March 2, 2013	Moon Joo-ran	Wax	Idiot Adada	Wax
91	March 9, 2013	Byun Jin-sub	Son Ho-young	Like Birds	Kim Da-hyun
91	March 9, 2013	Byun Jin-sub	Narsha (Brown Eyed Girls)	Being Alone	Kim Da-hyun
91	March 9, 2013	Byun Jin-sub	2BiC	Back to You	Kim Da-hyun
91	March 9, 2013	Byun Jin-sub	Daybreak	For a Lady	Kim Da-hyun
91	March 9, 2013	Byun Jin-sub	Wax	Back to Me	Kim Da-hyun
91	March 9, 2013	Byun Jin-sub	Kim Da-hyun feat. Kang Chan-hee & Kim Sae-ron	Wishful Thinking	Kim Da-hyun
92	March 16, 2013	Chang Deok	Wax	After You Left	EZ Hyung
92	March 16, 2013	Chang Deok	MBLAQ (Mir & Seungho) feat. Soyou (Sistar)	You Like Me, I Like You	EZ Hyung
92	March 16, 2013	Chang Deok	Narsha (Brown Eyed Girls)	I Don't' Want to Love	EZ Hyung
92	March 16, 2013	Chang Deok	No Brain	The Girl and the Streetlight	EZ Hyung
92	March 16, 2013	Chang Deok	Kim Da-hyun	Sending Me Off with a Smile	EZ Hyung
92	March 16, 2013	Chang Deok	EZ Hyung	For the Allotted Time	EZ Hyung
93	March 23, 2013	Pearl Sisters	Kim Da-hyun	Cup of Coffee	Ailee & Bae Chi-gi
93	March 23, 2013	Pearl Sisters	Wax	Everyone's the Same	Ailee & Bae Chi-gi
93	March 23, 2013	Pearl Sisters	Hong Kyung-min	Heart Like a Gypsy	Ailee & Bae Chi-gi
93	March 23, 2013	Pearl Sisters	Ailee & Bae Chi-gi	My Dear	Ailee & Bae Chi-gi
93	March 23, 2013	Pearl Sisters	Narsha (Brown Eyed Girls)	I Don't Like It	Ailee & Bae Chi-gi
93	March 23, 2013	Pearl Sisters	4Men	The One Who Will Leave	Ailee & Bae Chi-gi
94	March 30, 2013	Women's Generation	Wax & Park Hyun-bin	Shabang Shabang	Davichi
94	March 30, 2013	Women's Generation	U-KISS (Soohyun, Kevin, Dongho)	Wasp	Davichi
94	March 30, 2013	Women's Generation	Davichi	The Maze of Love	Davichi
94	March 30, 2013	Women's Generation	Yoon Hyung-ryul	Love	Davichi
94	March 30, 2013	Women's Generation	Narsha (Brown Eyed Girls)	Challang Challang	Davichi
94	March 30, 2013	Women's Generation	Yurisangja	A Song for my Wife	Davichi
95	April 6, 2013	Sunflower (해바라기)	Sonya	White Love	Yurisangja
95	April 6, 2013	Sunflower (해바라기)	Sandeul (B1A4)	In your Arms	Yurisangja
95	April 6, 2013	Sunflower (해바라기)	Teen Top	My Heart's Jewel Box	Yurisangja
95	April 6, 2013	Sunflower (해바라기)	Moon Myung-jin	Not Just Sadness	Yurisangja
95	April 6, 2013	Sunflower (해바라기)	4Men	Love's Poem	Yurisangja
96	April 13, 2013	Sunflower (해바라기)	Hong Kyung-min	Tell Them Already	Yurisangja
96	April 13, 2013	Sunflower (해바라기)	Alex	Someone that Makes Me Happy	Yurisangja
96	April 13, 2013	Sunflower (해바라기)	Wax feat. Heo In-sang & Kanto	Everything is Love	Yurisangja
96	April 13, 2013	Sunflower (해바라기)	Yurisangja	Love is Always There	Yurisangja
96	April 13, 2013	Sunflower (해바라기)	The SeeYa	Cloud, Wild Flower, Stone, Woman	Yurisangja
96	April 13, 2013	Sunflower (해바라기)	The Position	You	Yurisangja
97	April 20, 2013	Sim Soo-bong	Bada	All I Know is Love	JK Kim Dong-wook
97	April 20, 2013	Sim Soo-bong	Jay Park	Men are Ships, Women are Harbours	JK Kim Dong-wook
97	April 20, 2013	Sim Soo-bong	4Men	Deeply Pleading	JK Kim Dong-wook
97	April 20, 2013	Sim Soo-bong	Rose Motel	I'll Fall in Love this Autumn	JK Kim Dong-wook
97	April 20, 2013	Sim Soo-bong	JK Kim Dong-wook	One Million Roses	JK Kim Dong-wook
97	April 20, 2013	Sim Soo-bong	Wax	I Hate It	JK Kim Dong-wook
98	April 27, 2013	Lee Moon-se	Na Rae	I Don't Know Yet	JK Kim Dong-wook
98	April 27, 2013	Lee Moon-se	Huh Gak	When my Love Passes By	JK Kim Dong-wook
98	April 27, 2013	Lee Moon-se	Jay Park feat. Crush	Red Sunset	JK Kim Dong-wook
98	April 27, 2013	Lee Moon-se	Lee Jung	Only the Sound of her Laughter	JK Kim Dong-wook
98	April 27, 2013	Lee Moon-se	Jung Sung-hwa	In the Rain	JK Kim Dong-wook
99	May 4, 2013	Lee Moon-se	Spica	Flying in the Deep Night	JK Kim Dong-wook
99	May 4, 2013	Lee Moon-se	Bada	Old Love	JK Kim Dong-wook
99	May 4, 2013	Lee Moon-se	Kim Tae-woo	Hooray for Singles	JK Kim Dong-wook
99	May 4, 2013	Lee Moon-se	JK Kim Dong-wook	When You Look at Me	JK Kim Dong-wook
99	May 4, 2013	Lee Moon-se	Moon Myung-jin	Standing in the Shade of Roadside Trees	JK Kim Dong-wook
99	May 4, 2013	Lee Moon-se	4Men	Movie Datin'	JK Kim Dong-wook
100	May 11, 2013	Deulgukhwa	Ha Dong-kyun	After Love	Moon Myung-jin
100	May 11, 2013	Deulgukhwa	JK Kim Dong-wook	Thia is my World	Moon Myung-jin
100	May 11, 2013	Deulgukhwa	Jay Park & Youme	Every Day with You	Moon Myung-jin
100	May 11, 2013	Deulgukhwa	Jung Dong-ha	Don't Worry, Dear	Moon Myung-jin
100	May 11, 2013	Deulgukhwa	4Men	It's Only Me	Moon Myung-jin
101	May 18, 2013	Deulgukhwa	The One	It's Only Me	Moon Myung-jin
101	May 18, 2013	Deulgukhwa	Sweet Sorrow	Round & Round & Round	Moon Myung-jin
101	May 18, 2013	Deulgukhwa	Lee Jung	March	Moon Myung-jin
101	May 18, 2013	Deulgukhwa	Ali	Don't Worry, Dear	Moon Myung-jin
101	May 18, 2013	Deulgukhwa	Moon Myung-jin	Until the Morning Brightens	Moon Myung-jin
101	May 18, 2013	Deulgukhwa	Buga Kingz	During my Life	Moon Myung-jin
102	May 25, 2013	Lee Seung-chul	Moon Myung-jin feat. Honey Family	There is None Like You	Bada
102	May 25, 2013	Lee Seung-chul	Huh Gak	The Western Sky	Bada
102	May 25, 2013	Lee Seung-chul	Ailee	Hey, Hui	Bada
102	May 25, 2013	Lee Seung-chul	Young Ji	The Last Concert	Bada
102	May 25, 2013	Lee Seung-chul	F.T. Island	Jasmine Flower	Bada
102	May 25, 2013	Lee Seung-chul	Ulala Session	Wandering	Bada
103	June 1, 2013	Lee Seung-chul	K.Will	You're the Only One for Me	Bada
103	June 1, 2013	Lee Seung-chul	Choi Jung-in	I Loved a Friend's Friend	Bada
103	June 1, 2013	Lee Seung-chul	Nine9	Don't Say Goodbye	Bada
103	June 1, 2013	Lee Seung-chul	Bada	Girls' Generation	Bada
103	June 1, 2013	Lee Seung-chul	Shin Yong-jae (4Men)	Never Ending Story	Bada
103	June 1, 2013	Lee Seung-chul	Lee Jung	Fate	Bada
104	June 8, 2013	Second Anniversary Special	Nam Hyun-joon & Park Ae-ri	Arirang	Im Tae-kyung
104	June 8, 2013	Second Anniversary Special	Jung Dong-ha	Kwaejina Ching Ching Nane	Im Tae-kyung
104	June 8, 2013	Second Anniversary Special	4Minute (Gayoon, Jiyoon & Sohyun)	Nuilliriya	Im Tae-kyung
104	June 8, 2013	Second Anniversary Special	Moon Myung-jin feat. Spacecowboy & Honey Family	Roast Chestnut Ballad	Im Tae-kyung
104	June 8, 2013	Second Anniversary Special	Im Tae-kyung	Bird Ballad	Im Tae-kyung
104	June 8, 2013	Second Anniversary Special	Bada	For 500 Years	Im Tae-kyung
105	June 15, 2013	Jo Duk-bae	The Position	In my Dream	Bada
105	June 15, 2013	Jo Duk-bae	Moon Myung-jin	I Won'd Sing Sad Songs	Bada
105	June 15, 2013	Jo Duk-bae	Joosuc & Lim Jeong-hee	You Look So Beautiful from the Back	Bada
105	June 15, 2013	Jo Duk-bae	Bada	My Old Story	Bada
105	June 15, 2013	Jo Duk-bae	MBLAQ	If You Come into my Heart	Bada
105	June 15, 2013	Jo Duk-bae	Seo In-young	With a Flutter	Bada
106	June 22, 2013	Park Nam-jung	Tim	Dear Lady	Niel & 100%
106	June 22, 2013	Park Nam-jung	HotSechGodRG (Moon Hee-joon, Tony An, Danny Ahn, Eun Ji-won, & Chun Myung-hoon)	Days with Rain	Niel & 100%
106	June 22, 2013	Park Nam-jung	Bada	Unsuccessful Love	Niel & 100%
106	June 22, 2013	Park Nam-jung	Flower	Goodbye my Love	Niel & 100%
106	June 22, 2013	Park Nam-jung	Niel & 100%	Longing for You	Niel & 100%
106	June 22, 2013	Park Nam-jung	Hong Kyung-min	Seen from Afar	Niel & 100%
107	June 29, 2013	Seol Woon-do	Park Hyun-bin	By Chance	Moon Myung-jin
107	June 29, 2013	Seol Woon-do	Youme	The Lost 30 Years	Moon Myung-jin
107	June 29, 2013	Seol Woon-do	Common Ground & AshGray	Cause I Feel Sad	Moon Myung-jin
107	June 29, 2013	Seol Woon-do	B1A4	Sister	Moon Myung-jin
107	June 29, 2013	Seol Woon-do	Joosuc & Hong Jin-young	A Woman Dancing Samba	Moon Myung-jin
108	July 5, 2013	Seol Woon-do	Choi Jung-in	Let's Dance the Cha Cha	Moon Myung-jin
108	July 5, 2013	Seol Woon-do	Hong Kyung-min	I Only Loved You	Moon Myung-jin
108	July 5, 2013	Seol Woon-do	JK Kim Dong-wook	I Will Forget	Moon Myung-jin
108	July 5, 2013	Seol Woon-do	Bada	Compass	Moon Myung-jin
108	July 5, 2013	Seol Woon-do	Moon Myung-jin	Woman, Woman, Woman	Moon Myung-jin
108	July 5, 2013	Seol Woon-do	Lee Ki-chan	Let's Twist	Moon Myung-jin
109	July 13, 2013	DJ Doc	Jung Joon-young	Remember	Norazo
109	July 13, 2013	DJ Doc	B1A4	Dance with DOC	Norazo
109	July 13, 2013	DJ Doc	Moon Myung-jin	Summer Story	Norazo
109	July 13, 2013	DJ Doc	Bada	Run to You	Norazo
109	July 13, 2013	DJ Doc	Norazo	Murphy's Law	Norazo
109	July 13, 2013	DJ Doc	Sistar	Ok? Ok!	Norazo
110	July 20, 2013	Yoo Jae-ha	Moon Myung-jin	Because I Love You	Ha Dong-kyun feat. GB9
110	July 20, 2013	Yoo Jae-ha	Jo Wo-seon	Melancholic Letter	Ha Dong-kyun feat. GB9
110	July 20, 2013	Yoo Jae-ha	Hong Kyung-min	Past Day	Ha Dong-kyun feat. GB9
110	July 20, 2013	Yoo Jae-ha	JK Kim Dong-wook	Covered Up Road	Ha Dong-kyun feat. GB9
110	July 20, 2013	Yoo Jae-ha	Ha Dong-kyun feat. GB9	You in my Arms	Ha Dong-kyun feat. GB9
110	July 20, 2013	Yoo Jae-ha	One More Chance	Forever with You	Ha Dong-kyun feat. GB9
111	July 27, 2013	Yoo Ho	Im Tae-kyung	My Love's Far Away	Bada
111	July 27, 2013	Yoo Ho	Jo Moon-geun feat. 5ZiC (M.I.B)	Barefooted Youth	Bada
111	July 27, 2013	Yoo Ho	Kim Ba-da	Leaves Silently	Bada
111	July 27, 2013	Yoo Ho	ZE:A FIVE	Sweet Eighteen and Real Man	Bada
111	July 27, 2013	Yoo Ho	Bada	Song of Katusa	Bada
111	July 27, 2013	Yoo Ho	Moon Myung-jin	Farewell at Busan Station	Bada
112	August 3, 2013	COOL	Jung Joon-young	Understanding Man and Woman	Lee Jung
112	August 3, 2013	COOL	Moon Myung-jin	Women on the Beach	Lee Jung
112	August 3, 2013	COOL	Girl's Day	All for You	Lee Jung
112	August 3, 2013	COOL	Lee Jung	Before It Becomes Too Sad	Lee Jung
112	August 3, 2013	COOL	Bada & Oh Na-mi	Sorrow	Lee Jung
112	August 3, 2013	COOL	ZE:A	Destiny	Lee Jung
113	August 10, 2013	Love & Peace	Im Tae-kyung & Jung Joo-ri	Lady in Jeans	JK Kim Dong-wook
113	August 10, 2013	Love & Peace	Jung Dong-ha feat. Seo Jae-hyuk & Chae Je-min (Boohwal)	I Cannot Tell You	JK Kim Dong-wook
113	August 10, 2013	Love & Peace	Lee Sang	Mother's Lullaby (사랑한 후에) & March	JK Kim Dong-wook
113	August 10, 2013	Love & Peace	Gilme (Clover)	A Rose	JK Kim Dong-wook
113	August 10, 2013	Love & Peace	JK Kim Dong-wook	I Want to Cry	JK Kim Dong-wook
113	August 10, 2013	Love & Peace	Bada	It's Been a While	JK Kim Dong-wook
114	August 17, 2013	Jang Mi-hwa & Im Hee-sok	Gilme (Clover)	Live Like the Wind	Hong Jin-young & Outsider
114	August 17, 2013	Jang Mi-hwa & Im Hee-sok	Youme	The Yoke of Love	Hong Jin-young & Outsider
114	August 17, 2013	Jang Mi-hwa & Im Hee-sok	Cho Jang-hyuk	How Do I Say It?	Hong Jin-young & Outsider
114	August 17, 2013	Jang Mi-hwa & Im Hee-sok	EXO (Baekhyun & Chen)	I Really Didn't Know	Hong Jin-young & Outsider
114	August 17, 2013	Jang Mi-hwa & Im Hee-sok	JK Kim Dong-wook	My Love Has Gone	Hong Jin-young & Outsider
114	August 17, 2013	Jang Mi-hwa & Im Hee-sok	Hong Jin-young & Outsider	Hello	Hong Jin-young & Outsider
115	August 24, 2013	The Legend 7	Lee Jung	You Are Not Alone and Beat It	Jung Dong-ha (439)
115	August 24, 2013	The Legend 7	Im Tae-kyung	My Way	Jung Dong-ha (439)
115	August 24, 2013	The Legend 7	Bada	In Praise of Death	Jung Dong-ha (439)
115	August 24, 2013	The Legend 7	JK Kim Dong-wook	Past Love	Jung Dong-ha (439)
115	August 24, 2013	The Legend 7	ZE:A FIVE	Hot Stuff	Jung Dong-ha (439)
115	August 24, 2013	The Legend 7	Moon Myung-jin	Around Thirty	Jung Dong-ha (439)
115	August 24, 2013	The Legend 7	Jung Dong-ha	Like Rain, Like Music	Jung Dong-ha (439)
116	August 31, 2013	Jeon Young-rok	Outsider feat. Kim Jae-kyung	Write Love with a Pencil	Bada
116	August 31, 2013	Jeon Young-rok	Gilme (Clover)	White Night	Bada
116	August 31, 2013	Jeon Young-rok	Bada	Spark	Bada
116	August 31, 2013	Jeon Young-rok	Rose Motel	Paper Crane	Bada
116	August 31, 2013	Jeon Young-rok	Cho Jang-hyuk	Evening Glow	Bada
116	August 31, 2013	Jeon Young-rok	EXO	It's Still a Dark Night	Bada
117	September 7, 2013	Heartthrobs Special	Jang Ho-il (015B) & Kim Yong-jin (Bohemian)	On an Empty Street	Hyun Jin-young, Moon Hee-joon & Eun Ji-won
117	September 7, 2013	Heartthrobs Special	Sung Dae-hyun (R.ef) & ZE:A	Despair and Farewell Formula	Hyun Jin-young, Moon Hee-joon & Eun Ji-won
117	September 7, 2013	Heartthrobs Special	Shin Chul & Bada	Why Do You	Hyun Jin-young, Moon Hee-joon & Eun Ji-won
117	September 7, 2013	Heartthrobs Special	Lee Hyun-woo & Geeks	The Day After You Left	Hyun Jin-young, Moon Hee-joon & Eun Ji-won
117	September 7, 2013	Heartthrobs Special	Hyun Jin-young, Moon Hee-joon & Eun Ji-won	You Inside my Dim Memory	Hyun Jin-young, Moon Hee-joon & Eun Ji-won
117	September 7, 2013	Heartthrobs Special	Hwang Kyu-young & Norazo	I Can Do It	Hyun Jin-young, Moon Hee-joon & Eun Ji-won
118	September 14, 2013	Heartthrob Special with Nam Jin	IVY	If I Had a Lover (나에게 애인이 있다면)	Ailee (386)
118	September 14, 2013	Heartthrob Special with Nam Jin	Can	The Heroine of My Soul (내 영혼의 히로인)	Ailee (386)
118	September 14, 2013	Heartthrob Special with Nam Jin	ZE:A feat. Kyungri (9MUSES)	Darling, Please Don't Change (그대여 변치 마오)	Ailee (386)
118	September 14, 2013	Heartthrob Special with Nam Jin	Ailee	Empty Glass (빈 잔)	Ailee (386)
118	September 14, 2013	Heartthrob Special with Nam Jin	LEDApple	Heartbreakingly (가슴 아프게)	Ailee (386)
118	September 14, 2013	Heartthrob Special with Nam Jin	EXO	With You (님과 함께)	Ailee (386)
119	September 21, 2013	Heartthrob Special with Nam Jin	JK Kim Dong-wook	Should Have a Beautiful Heart (마음이 고와야지)	Yang Dong-geun (429)
119	September 21, 2013	Heartthrob Special with Nam Jin	Nam Hyun-joon & Park Ae-ri feat. Crispi Crunch	Mother (어머님)	Yang Dong-geun (429)
119	September 21, 2013	Heartthrob Special with Nam Jin	Jung Dong-ha	Love Me Once More (미워도 다시 한 번)	Yang Dong-geun (429)
119	September 21, 2013	Heartthrob Special with Nam Jin	Yang Dong-geun	Nest (둥지)	Yang Dong-geun (429)
119	September 21, 2013	Heartthrob Special with Nam Jin	Cho Jang-hyuk	It's Me (나야 나)	Yang Dong-geun (429)
120	September 28, 2013	Yoo Yeol & Jung Sura	Lee Soo-young	This is a Break Up	Cho Jang-hyuk
120	September 28, 2013	Yoo Yeol & Jung Sura	Teen Top (Niel & Changjo)	Joy	Cho Jang-hyuk
120	September 28, 2013	Yoo Yeol & Jung Sura	Outsider feat. Jin Bo-ra	Eruhwa	Cho Jang-hyuk
120	September 28, 2013	Yoo Yeol & Jung Sura	Kim So-hyun & Son Jun-ho	Hymn to Love	Cho Jang-hyuk
120	September 28, 2013	Yoo Yeol & Jung Sura	Lim Jeong-hee	Have You Seen my Love	Cho Jang-hyuk
120	September 28, 2013	Yoo Yeol & Jung Sura	Monday Kiz	Just the Way You Are	Cho Jang-hyuk
121	October 5, 2013	Yoo Yeol & Jung Sura	Daybreak	Happy Days are Gone	Cho Jang-hyuk
121	October 5, 2013	Yoo Yeol & Jung Sura	Hong Jin-young	The Street of the City	Cho Jang-hyuk
121	October 5, 2013	Yoo Yeol & Jung Sura	Wax	Father' Chair	Cho Jang-hyuk
121	October 5, 2013	Yoo Yeol & Jung Sura	Cho Jang-hyuk	Was It Just the Wind?	Cho Jang-hyuk
121	October 5, 2013	Yoo Yeol & Jung Sura	Yurisangja	Autumn Rain	Cho Jang-hyuk
121	October 5, 2013	Yoo Yeol & Jung Sura	ZE:A	Ah! Republic of Korea	Cho Jang-hyuk
122	October 12, 2013	Commemorative Songs	Kim Jae-hee	The More I Love	Kim Jin-ho
122	October 12, 2013	Commemorative Songs	Monday Kiz	Fallen Tower of Love	Kim Jin-ho
122	October 12, 2013	Commemorative Songs	Kang Min-kyung (Davichi) & Jung Jae-hyung	With All my Tears	Kim Jin-ho
122	October 12, 2013	Commemorative Songs	VIXX	To Put It in Words	Kim Jin-ho
122	October 12, 2013	Commemorative Songs	Lee Jung	My Love that Followed the Leaves	Kim Jin-ho
122	October 12, 2013	Commemorative Songs	Cho Jang-hyuk	Nameless Girl	Kim Jin-ho
122	October 12, 2013	Commemorative Songs	Kim Jin-ho	As You Live	Kim Jin-ho
123	October 19, 2013	Choi Jin-hee	Cho Jang-hyuk	Are You my Life	J2M
123	October 19, 2013	Choi Jin-hee	Bulnabang Star Sausage Club	Because of my Lingering Love	J2M
123	October 19, 2013	Choi Jin-hee	Soyou (Sistar) & Jay Park	Love Maze	J2M
123	October 19, 2013	Choi Jin-hee	Youme	We Broke Up too Easily	J2M
123	October 19, 2013	Choi Jin-hee	J2M	Spray	J2M
123	October 19, 2013	Choi Jin-hee	Wax	Reunion in Heaven	J2M
123	October 19, 2013	Choi Jin-hee	Hong Kyung-min	Baby Doll	J2M
124	October 26, 2013	Yim Jae-beom	Moon Myung-jin	If This Night Passes	Sandeul
124	October 26, 2013	Yim Jae-beom	Ali	I Could Love You Again	Sandeul
124	October 26, 2013	Yim Jae-beom	Kim So-hyun & Son Jun-ho	Scar Deeper than Love	Sandeul
124	October 26, 2013	Yim Jae-beom	K.Will	Where are you, My girl?	Sandeul
124	October 26, 2013	Yim Jae-beom	Wheesung	Stigma	Sandeul
124	October 26, 2013	Yim Jae-beom	Sojung (Ladies' Code)	Beautiful Misunderstanding	Sandeul
124	October 26, 2013	Yim Jae-beom	Sandeul (B1A4)	I Am a Candlelight Before You	Sandeul
125	November 2, 2013	Shin Seung-hun	Jung Joon-young	Because I Love You	V.O.S
125	November 2, 2013	Shin Seung-hun	Kim So-hyun & Son Jun-ho	After a Long Separation	V.O.S
125	November 2, 2013	Shin Seung-hun	Shin Yong-jae (4Men)	I Believe	V.O.S
125	November 2, 2013	Shin Seung-hun	Ali	By Chance	V.O.S
125	November 2, 2013	Shin Seung-hun	LEDApple	Invisible Love	V.O.S
125	November 2, 2013	Shin Seung-hun	Sandeul (B1A4)	My Way of Love	V.O.S
125	November 2, 2013	Shin Seung-hun	V.O.S	You're Just in a Higher Place	V.O.S
126	November 9, 2013	Kim Jung-soo & Kim Kook-hwan	Sandeul (B1A4)	Do You Know Kketsuni	Im Tae-kyung
126	November 9, 2013	Kim Jung-soo & Kim Kook-hwan	ZE:A	My Heart Trembles	Im Tae-kyung
126	November 9, 2013	Kim Jung-soo & Kim Kook-hwan	Lee Soo-young	Let's Break the Dishes	Im Tae-kyung
126	November 9, 2013	Kim Jung-soo & Kim Kook-hwan	Im Tae-kyung	My Love	Im Tae-kyung
126	November 9, 2013	Kim Jung-soo & Kim Kook-hwan	G.O (MBLAQ)	My Heart is with You	Im Tae-kyung
126	November 9, 2013	Kim Jung-soo & Kim Kook-hwan	Davichi	Ta Ta Ta	Im Tae-kyung
127	November 16, 2013	Autumn Men Special	Cho Jang-hyuk & Kimg Young-ho	About Romance	Im Chang-jung & Kim Chang-ryul
127	November 16, 2013	Autumn Men Special	Ali & Kim Joon-hyun	Paulownia Leaf	Im Chang-jung & Kim Chang-ryul
127	November 16, 2013	Autumn Men Special	Changmin (2AM) & Dokgo Young-jae	Train Station in Hometown	Im Chang-jung & Kim Chang-ryul
127	November 16, 2013	Autumn Men Special	Lee Hae-ri (Davichi) & Kim Donghyun	Kim Sung Ho's Reminiscence	Im Chang-jung & Kim Chang-ryul
127	November 16, 2013	Autumn Men Special	Sandeul (B1A4) & Choi Min-soo	Woman in the Rain	Im Chang-jung & Kim Chang-ryul
127	November 16, 2013	Autumn Men Special	Im Chang-jung & Kim Chang-ryul	Turn Around at Samgakji	Im Chang-jung & Kim Chang-ryul
128	November 23, 2013	Yangpa	Lee Hae-ri (Davichi)	Lone Path	Yurisangja
128	November 23, 2013	Yangpa	Big Star	Lone Goose	Yurisangja
128	November 23, 2013	Yangpa	Lee Soo-young	Letter	Yurisangja
128	November 23, 2013	Yangpa	Choi Jung-in	Truth about Love	Yurisangja
128	November 23, 2013	Yangpa	V.O.S	You Don't Know	Yurisangja
128	November 23, 2013	Yangpa	Yurisangja	Little Bird	Yurisangja
129	November 30, 2013	Park Sang-min	V.O.S	Plea	Lee Hae-ri
129	November 30, 2013	Park Sang-min	Sandeul (B1A4)	One Love	Lee Hae-ri
129	November 30, 2013	Park Sang-min	Teen Top	Lady in Jeans	Lee Hae-ri
129	November 30, 2013	Park Sang-min	Lee Hae-ri (Davichi)	The Truth About Love	Lee Hae-ri
129	November 30, 2013	Park Sang-min	Jung Jae-wook	A Farewell to Arms	Lee Hae-ri
129	November 30, 2013	Park Sang-min	Ali	You Drifted Away	Lee Hae-ri
130	December 7, 2013	Remake Special	Lee Hae-ri (Davichi)	Passion Flower	Kim Ba-da
130	December 7, 2013	Remake Special	Cho Jang-hyuk	Watermill Life	Kim Ba-da
130	December 7, 2013	Remake Special	Lee Soo-young	Your Shadow	Kim Ba-da
130	December 7, 2013	Remake Special	Wheesung	Night Fog	Kim Ba-da
130	December 7, 2013	Remake Special	Teen Top	Come and See Me	Kim Ba-da
130	December 7, 2013	Remake Special	Jung Jae-wook	Miss	Kim Ba-da
131	December 14, 2013	Remake Special	Lee Ki-chan	Wanderer	Kim Ba-da
131	December 14, 2013	Remake Special	JK Kim Dong-wook	Where I Sing	Kim Ba-da
131	December 14, 2013	Remake Special	Tae One	Now	Kim Ba-da
131	December 14, 2013	Remake Special	V.O.S	It's Snowing	Kim Ba-da
131	December 14, 2013	Remake Special	Jang Hyun-seung	Wedding Cake	Kim Ba-da
131	December 14, 2013	Remake Special	Kim Ba-da	Maria	Kim Ba-da
132	December 21, 2013	Yoon Sang	Huh Gak	Through	Huh Gak
132	December 21, 2013	Yoon Sang	V.O.S	Inside the Military Draft Train	Huh Gak
132	December 21, 2013	Yoon Sang	Uji (Bestie)	One More Step	Huh Gak
132	December 21, 2013	Yoon Sang	Sandeul (B1A4)	You in my Memory	Huh Gak
132	December 21, 2013	Yoon Sang	Lee Ki-chan	Violent Fragrance	Huh Gak
132	December 21, 2013	Yoon Sang	Bumkey & San E	Shade of a Break Up	Huh Gak
133	December 28, 2013	Tae Jinah	Ulala Session	I'm So Sorry	Cho Jang-hyuk
133	December 28, 2013	Tae Jinah	T-ara	Nov Everyone Can Fall in Love	Cho Jang-hyuk
133	December 28, 2013	Tae Jinah	U Sung-eun	The Longing	Cho Jang-hyuk
133	December 28, 2013	Tae Jinah	Narsha (Brown Eyed Girls)	Companion	Cho Jang-hyuk
133	December 28, 2013	Tae Jinah	V.O.S	Girl Who Doesn't Look at a Mirror	Cho Jang-hyuk
133	December 28, 2013	Tae Jinah	Cho Jang-hyuk	Okgyeong	Cho Jang-hyuk

=== 2014 ===
List of episodes aired in 2014

Singers listed in order of performance.

Episode #	Broadcast Date	Legend or Theme	Guest Singers	Songs	Final Winner (Points)
134	January 4, 2014	The Rivals	Hyolyn (Sistar)	First Impression	JK Kim Dong-wook
134	January 4, 2014	The Rivals	Ailee	You Reflected in a Smile	JK Kim Dong-wook
134	January 4, 2014	The Rivals	V.O.S	If I Have to Forget	JK Kim Dong-wook
134	January 4, 2014	The Rivals	Cho Jang-hyuk	It's a Lie	JK Kim Dong-wook
134	January 4, 2014	The Rivals	Moon Myung-jin	You Wouldn't Know	JK Kim Dong-wook
134	January 4, 2014	The Rivals	Bada	The Image of You Letting me Leave with a Smile	JK Kim Dong-wook
135	January 12, 2014	The Rivals	Ali	Pure Love of a 19-Year Old	JK Kim Dong-wook
135	January 12, 2014	The Rivals	Jung Dong-ha	Early Rain	JK Kim Dong-wook
135	January 12, 2014	The Rivals	Kim Ba-da	Suzanne, Hello on the Window	JK Kim Dong-wook
135	January 12, 2014	The Rivals	Bae Ji-young	Pierrot in the City	JK Kim Dong-wook
135	January 12, 2014	The Rivals	Rose Motel	Don't Change, my Love	JK Kim Dong-wook
135	January 12, 2014	The Rivals	JK Kim Dong-wook	Forever	JK Kim Dong-wook
136	January 18, 2014	Kim Kwang-seok	Jung Dong-ha	I Loved You	Ailee
136	January 18, 2014	Kim Kwang-seok	Ali	I'll Become Dust	Ailee
136	January 18, 2014	Kim Kwang-seok	Soo Jin	Wait for Me	Ailee
136	January 18, 2014	Kim Kwang-seok	Huh Gak	In the Name of Love	Ailee
136	January 18, 2014	Kim Kwang-seok	Ailee	It's Not Love if it Hurts Too Much	Ailee
136	January 18, 2014	Kim Kwang-seok	Rose Motel	Story of a Couple in their 60s	Ailee
137	January 25, 2014	Hometown Special	Kim So-hyun & Son Jun-ho	Nostalgia	Hong Kyung-min
137	January 25, 2014	Hometown Special	T-ara (Hyomin & Eunjung)	Faraway Hometown	Hong Kyung-min
137	January 25, 2014	Hometown Special	Soo Jin	Said	Hong Kyung-min
137	January 25, 2014	Hometown Special	Yurisangja	Tearful Tumen River	Hong Kyung-min
137	January 25, 2014	Hometown Special	Bada	Come Back to Busan Port	Hong Kyung-min
137	January 25, 2014	Hometown Special	DickPunks	Wild Rose	Hong Kyung-min
138	February 1, 2014	Hometown Special	Lyn	My Hometown in Distant Memory	Hong Kyung-min
138	February 1, 2014	Hometown Special	Wax	When You Go to L.A.	Hong Kyung-min
138	February 1, 2014	Hometown Special	V.O.S	My Hometown Chungcheong-do	Hong Kyung-min
138	February 1, 2014	Hometown Special	Nam Hyun-joon & Park Ae-ri	Harbour	Hong Kyung-min
138	February 1, 2014	Hometown Special	Niel (Teen Top)	The Face I Miss	Hong Kyung-min
138	February 1, 2014	Hometown Special	Hong Kyung-min	I'll Live on this Soil	Hong Kyung-min
139	February 8, 2014	Joo Hyun-mi	Cho Jang-hyuk	Rainy Yeongdong Bridge	Gummy (445)
139	February 8, 2014	Joo Hyun-mi	Taemin (Shinee)	Hold On	Gummy (445)
139	February 8, 2014	Joo Hyun-mi	Niel (Teen Top)	One-Sided Love	Gummy (445)
139	February 8, 2014	Joo Hyun-mi	Kim Jong-seo feat. Min Suk (Raccoon Boys)	Teary Blues (눈물의 부르스)	Gummy (445)
139	February 8, 2014	Joo Hyun-mi	Gummy	You are Just a Memory Now	Gummy (445)
139	February 8, 2014	Joo Hyun-mi	Daybreak	My Love from Shinsa-dong	Gummy (445)
139	February 8, 2014	Joo Hyun-mi	V.O.S	We Met Again	Gummy (445)
140	February 15, 2014	Park Geon-ho	V.O.S	You Are Crying as Well	Yoon Min-soo (419)
140	February 15, 2014	Park Geon-ho	Kim Jong-seo feat. Min Suk (Raccoon Boys)	Heartless Blues (무정부르스)	Yoon Min-soo (419)
140	February 15, 2014	Park Geon-ho	Yoon Min-soo	A Love Story (어느 소녀의 사랑이야기)	Yoon Min-soo (419)
140	February 15, 2014	Park Geon-ho	Bada	Circling Around	Yoon Min-soo (419)
140	February 15, 2014	Park Geon-ho	Niel & 100%	Bobbed Hair	Yoon Min-soo (419)
140	February 15, 2014	Park Geon-ho	DickPunks	Story of Last Night	Yoon Min-soo (419)
141	February 22, 2014	Jeong Mi-jo	Wax feat. Hanhae	Rapids	Kim Jong-seo (412)
141	February 22, 2014	Jeong Mi-jo	Hong Kyung-min feat. Jung Yeong-ju	Flame	Kim Jong-seo (412)
141	February 22, 2014	Jeong Mi-jo	Ben	Waves	Kim Jong-seo (412)
141	February 22, 2014	Jeong Mi-jo	Lyn	Love and Seasons	Kim Jong-seo (412)
141	February 22, 2014	Jeong Mi-jo	Jun. K (2PM)	Oh! Love	Kim Jong-seo (412)
141	February 22, 2014	Jeong Mi-jo	Kim Jong-seo	Whistle (휘파람을 부세요)	Kim Jong-seo (412)
142	March 1, 2014	Independence Movement Day Special	100%	Our Beautiful Country	Kim Jong-seo (423)
142	March 1, 2014	Independence Movement Day Special	Jun. K (2PM)	Harbour of the Earth	Kim Jong-seo (423)
142	March 1, 2014	Independence Movement Day Special	Rose Motel	Evergreen Tree and Bonjo Arirang (본조아리랑)	Kim Jong-seo (423)
142	March 1, 2014	Independence Movement Day Special	Lee Se-joon (Yurisangja)	Living Away from Home	Kim Jong-seo (423)
142	March 1, 2014	Independence Movement Day Special	Kim Jong-seo feat. Yun Si-yeong	My Country, My People (내 나라 내 겨레)	Kim Jong-seo (423)
142	March 1, 2014	Independence Movement Day Special	Hong Kyung-min feat. Song So-hee	Arirang Alone	Kim Jong-seo (423)
142	March 1, 2014	Independence Movement Day Special	Yumi	Hometown in my Dream	Kim Jong-seo (423)
143	March 8, 2014	Actor Special	Kim Tae-woo & Kang Boo-ja	You and I	100% & Yang Huigyeong
143	March 8, 2014	Actor Special	Lee Se-joon (Yurisangja) & Hong Eun-hee	That Guy	100% & Yang Huigyeong
143	March 8, 2014	Actor Special	Hong Kyung-min & Oh Man-seok	Already	100% & Yang Huigyeong
143	March 8, 2014	Actor Special	Ailee & Lee Ji-hoon	Green Wood	100% & Yang Huigyeong
143	March 8, 2014	Actor Special	Bada & Kim Jun-ho	I'll Give You the Love Left in Me	100% & Yang Huigyeong
143	March 8, 2014	Actor Special	100% & Yang Hee-kyung	Romantic Cat	100% & Yang Huigyeong
144	March 15, 2014	Lee Mi-ja	Ulala Session	Twilight Blues	Sonya
144	March 15, 2014	Lee Mi-ja	Gummy	Lady Camillia	Sonya
144	March 15, 2014	Lee Mi-ja	B1A4	Maybe You Won't Come Back	Sonya
144	March 15, 2014	Lee Mi-ja	Ali	Cry Strong Wind	Sonya
144	March 15, 2014	Lee Mi-ja	Cho Jang-hyuk	I Loved You	Sonya
144	March 15, 2014	Lee Mi-ja	Lee Se-joon (Yurisangja)	Goodbye, Seoul	Sonya
145	March 22, 2014	Lee Mi-ja	Im Tae-kyung	Journey	Sonya
145	March 22, 2014	Lee Mi-ja	The Ray	Pure Love of a 19-Year Old	Sonya
145	March 22, 2014	Lee Mi-ja	Lee Soo-young	Teacher at an Island Village	Sonya
145	March 22, 2014	Lee Mi-ja	Jung Dong-ha	Miss	Sonya
145	March 22, 2014	Lee Mi-ja	Wax	Life of a Woman	Sonya
145	March 22, 2014	Lee Mi-ja	Sonya	Wild Goose Father	Sonya
146	March 29, 2014	Lee Sun-hee	Lena Park	Turning the Pages of Memories	The One
146	March 29, 2014	Lee Sun-hee	Park Soo-jin	When Lilac Wilts	The One
146	March 29, 2014	Lee Sun-hee	Ulala Session	Ah, the Old Days	The One
146	March 29, 2014	Lee Sun-hee	Bada	I Always Miss You	The One
146	March 29, 2014	Lee Sun-hee	Im Chang-jung	Our Beautiful Country	The One
146	March 29, 2014	Lee Sun-hee	Hong Kyung-min	Conflict	The One
147	April 5, 2014	Lee Sun-hee	Yoon Min-soo & Shin Yong-jae (4Men)	Fate	The One
147	April 5, 2014	Lee Sun-hee	Girl's Day (Sojin & Minah)	Yeong	The One
147	April 5, 2014	Lee Sun-hee	Rose Motel	A Bout of Laughter	The One
147	April 5, 2014	Lee Sun-hee	Ali	Dear J	The One
147	April 5, 2014	Lee Sun-hee	The One	Where the Love Falls	The One
147	April 5, 2014	Lee Sun-hee	Ben	I Want to Know	The One
148	April 12, 2014	Foreign Singers Special	Ailee	I Will Always Love You	ZE:A
148	April 12, 2014	Foreign Singers Special	The One	Early in the Morning	ZE:A
148	April 12, 2014	Foreign Singers Special	Got7	I Was Made for Dancing	ZE:A
148	April 12, 2014	Foreign Singers Special	Kim Jong-seo feat. Kim Tae-won (Boohwal) & Shin Daechul (Sinawe)	Hotel California	ZE:A
148	April 12, 2014	Foreign Singers Special	ZE:A	Step by Step	ZE:A
148	April 12, 2014	Foreign Singers Special	Bobby Kim	Sorry Seems to be the Hardest Word	ZE:A
149	May 24, 2014	Family Special	Jo Sung-mo	Chilgab Mountain	Wheesung
149	May 24, 2014	Family Special	Seo Young-eun	You Give me Happiness, Twinkle Twinkle Little Star	Wheesung
149	May 24, 2014	Family Special	Youme	Starry Night	Wheesung
149	May 24, 2014	Family Special	Gummy	Love Never Dies	Wheesung
149	May 24, 2014	Family Special	Kim Jin-ho	Family Picture	Wheesung
149	May 24, 2014	Family Special	Orange Caramel	Honey	Wheesung
149	May 24, 2014	Family Special	Wheesung	White Butterfly	Wheesung
150	May 31, 2014	Son Seo-ku	Sonya	My Dreams Faded Away	Rose Motel
150	May 31, 2014	Son Seo-ku	Lee Jung	My Love is an Old Miss	Rose Motel
150	May 31, 2014	Son Seo-ku	The One	My Only Love	Rose Motel
150	May 31, 2014	Son Seo-ku	BtoB	Bright Moon of the Fifteenth Night	Rose Motel
150	May 31, 2014	Son Seo-ku	Lee Se-joon (Yurisangja)	Man in a Yellow Shirt	Rose Motel
150	May 31, 2014	Son Seo-ku	Rose Motel	Last Stop of a Farewell	Rose Motel
151	June 7, 2014	International Music Festival Special	The One	Woman Outside the Window	Lee Se-joon
151	June 7, 2014	International Music Festival Special	DickPunks	Daring Woman	Lee Se-joon
151	June 7, 2014	International Music Festival Special	Jang Hyun-seung	At the Flower Garden	Lee Se-joon
151	June 7, 2014	International Music Festival Special	Uji (Bestie)	The Face that I Miss	Lee Se-joon
151	June 7, 2014	International Music Festival Special	Lee Se-joon (Yurisangja) feat. Ham Chun-ho	I Love Only You	Lee Se-joon
151	June 7, 2014	International Music Festival Special	Seomoon Tak feat. SINZO	Brilliant Light Inside that Flower	Lee Se-joon
152	June 14, 2014	Lee Chi-hyun	Hong Kyung-min	I Met Her Again	The One & Son Seung-yeon
152	June 14, 2014	Lee Chi-hyun	Lee Jung	Only You	The One & Son Seung-yeon
152	June 14, 2014	Lee Chi-hyun	Jang Hyun-seung	Sorrow of Love	The One & Son Seung-yeon
152	June 14, 2014	Lee Chi-hyun	The One & Son Seung-yeon	Before It Fades Away	The One & Son Seung-yeon
152	June 14, 2014	Lee Chi-hyun	aT	I Wasn't Lonely Then	The One & Son Seung-yeon
152	June 14, 2014	Lee Chi-hyun	Rose Motel	Gypsy Woman	The One & Son Seung-yeon
153	June 21, 2014	3rd Anniversary Special	Jung Dong-ha	Dear Friend	Ulala Session (437)
153	June 21, 2014	3rd Anniversary Special	Hong Kyung-min	Dear DJ	Ulala Session (437)
153	June 21, 2014	3rd Anniversary Special	Bada	Unbloomed Flower	Ulala Session (437)
153	June 21, 2014	3rd Anniversary Special	Kim Jong-seo	Affection (애모)	Ulala Session (437)
153	June 21, 2014	3rd Anniversary Special	JK Kim Dong-wook	Tragic Love	Ulala Session (437)
153	June 21, 2014	3rd Anniversary Special	Ulala Session	Excuse	Ulala Session (437)
153	June 21, 2014	3rd Anniversary Special	Lee Hae-ri (Davichi)	Invisible Love	Ulala Session (437)
154	June 28, 2014	Park Si-chun	Changmin (2AM)	Farewell in Busan Station	Gummy
154	June 28, 2014	Park Si-chun	Jeok Woo	Hometown Flower	Gummy
154	June 28, 2014	Park Si-chun	Jo Sung-mo	Raining Gomoryeong	Gummy
154	June 28, 2014	Park Si-chun	Fly to the Sky	Spring Days Passed By	Gummy
154	June 28, 2014	Park Si-chun	Choi Jung-in	Sorrowful Serenade	Gummy
154	June 28, 2014	Park Si-chun	Sunny Hill	Sweet 18	Gummy
154	June 28, 2014	Park Si-chun	Gummy	Stationary Windmill	Gummy
155	July 5, 2014	Summer Special	ZE:A & 9MUSES	Twist King	JK Kim Dong-wook & MC Sniper
155	July 5, 2014	Summer Special	Jung Dong-ha & DickPunks	Whale Hunting	JK Kim Dong-wook & MC Sniper
155	July 5, 2014	Summer Special	Jo Sung-mo & Lim Jeong-hee	Memory of Summer Day	JK Kim Dong-wook & MC Sniper
155	July 5, 2014	Summer Special	Gummy & Hwanhee (Fly to the Sky)	Star Falls	JK Kim Dong-wook & MC Sniper
155	July 5, 2014	Summer Special	Ailee & Shin Bo-ra	Let's Go on a Trip	JK Kim Dong-wook & MC Sniper
155	July 5, 2014	Summer Special	Orange Caramel & Jo Se-ho	Ulleungdo Twist	JK Kim Dong-wook & MC Sniper
155	July 5, 2014	Summer Special	JK Kim Dong-wook & MC Sniper	Lying on the Sea	JK Kim Dong-wook & MC Sniper
156	July 12, 2014	Campus Band Special	Lee Se-joon (Yurisangja) & NC.A	Cloud and I	Son Seung-yeon (415)
156	July 12, 2014	Campus Band Special	Hong Kyung-min	Just Like That	Son Seung-yeon (415)
156	July 12, 2014	Campus Band Special	Seomoon Tak	Playing with Fire	Son Seung-yeon (415)
156	July 12, 2014	Campus Band Special	Lee Hyeo-nu	I Lived without Knowing the World	Son Seung-yeon (415)
156	July 12, 2014	Campus Band Special	Orange Caramel	What Should I Do	Son Seung-yeon (415)
156	July 12, 2014	Campus Band Special	Son Seung-yeon	I Am the Wind	Son Seung-yeon (415)
156	July 12, 2014	Campus Band Special	DickPunks	Let's Go to the Beach	Son Seung-yeon (415)
157	July 19, 2014	Lee Ho-seop	Lee Hyeo-nu	Emergency Landing of Love	Nam Hyun-joon & Park Ae-ri ft. Park Jae-min
157	July 19, 2014	Lee Ho-seop	Ali	I Hate It	Nam Hyun-joon & Park Ae-ri ft. Park Jae-min
157	July 19, 2014	Lee Ho-seop	Han Ji-sang	Woman of Kasbah	Nam Hyun-joon & Park Ae-ri ft. Park Jae-min
157	July 19, 2014	Lee Ho-seop	Lee Se-joon (Yurisangja)	Chan Chan Chan	Nam Hyun-joon & Park Ae-ri ft. Park Jae-min
157	July 19, 2014	Lee Ho-seop	Nam Hyun-joon & Park Ae-ri ft. Park Jae-min	Everyone Cha Cha Cha	Nam Hyun-joon & Park Ae-ri ft. Park Jae-min
157	July 19, 2014	Lee Ho-seop	Hong Kyung-min	What is This	Nam Hyun-joon & Park Ae-ri ft. Park Jae-min
157	July 19, 2014	Lee Ho-seop	Lee Soo-young	It Ripples	Nam Hyun-joon & Park Ae-ri ft. Park Jae-min
158	July 26, 2014	Jo Young-nam	Jeok Woo	Delilah	ALi (447)
158	July 26, 2014	Jo Young-nam	Seomoon Tak	Hwagae Market	ALi (447)
158	July 26, 2014	Jo Young-nam	Lucky J	It's Hard to be Humble	ALi (447)
158	July 26, 2014	Jo Young-nam	Homme	Goodbye, City	ALi (447)
158	July 26, 2014	Jo Young-nam	Lee Hyeo-nu	Green Grass of Hometown	ALi (447)
158	July 26, 2014	Jo Young-nam	Song So-hee	I Can't Live without Love	ALi (447)
159	August 2, 2014	Jo Young-nam	Ulala Session	Watermill Life	ALi (447)
159	August 2, 2014	Jo Young-nam	Jo Sung-mo	Peony and Camellia	ALi (447)
159	August 2, 2014	Jo Young-nam	Son Seung-yeon	Now	ALi (447)
159	August 2, 2014	Jo Young-nam	Ali	For Once in my Life	ALi (447)
159	August 2, 2014	Jo Young-nam	No Brain	Mr. Choi's Third Daughter	ALi (447)
159	August 2, 2014	Jo Young-nam	Kim So-hyun & Son Jun-ho	Love	ALi (447)
160	August 9, 2014	Yoon Bok-hee	V.O.S & SoReal	Wanderer	Ailee (417)
160	August 9, 2014	Yoon Bok-hee	Jo Sung-mo	Why Do You Look Back	Ailee (417)
160	August 9, 2014	Yoon Bok-hee	Kim So-hyun & Son Jun-ho	I'll Follow You	Ailee (417)
160	August 9, 2014	Yoon Bok-hee	Son Seung-yeon	Move	Ailee (417)
160	August 9, 2014	Yoon Bok-hee	Ailee	Everyone	Ailee (417)
160	August 9, 2014	Yoon Bok-hee	Melody Day	But Gosh	Ailee (417)
160	August 9, 2014	Yoon Bok-hee	Homme	I Will Never Return	Ailee (417)
161	August 16, 2014	Lee Gyeong-seop	Shin Yong-jae (4Men)	If I Leave	Hong Kyung-min
161	August 16, 2014	Lee Gyeong-seop	Jung Jae-wook	Sad Engagement	Hong Kyung-min
161	August 16, 2014	Lee Gyeong-seop	Bada	To Heaven	Hong Kyung-min
161	August 16, 2014	Lee Gyeong-seop	Jo Sung-mo	For my Remaining Love	Hong Kyung-min
161	August 16, 2014	Lee Gyeong-seop	Teen Top	Promise	Hong Kyung-min
161	August 16, 2014	Lee Gyeong-seop	Ulala Session	Barefoot Youth	Hong Kyung-min
161	August 16, 2014	Lee Gyeong-seop	Hong Kyung-min	People who Make Me Sad	Hong Kyung-min
162	August 23, 2014	Original Girl Groups Special	Homme feat. VMC	I'm a 19-Year Old	Bada (418)
162	August 23, 2014	Original Girl Groups Special	Kim Kyung-ho	The First Train (첫차)	Bada (418)
162	August 23, 2014	Original Girl Groups Special	DickPunks	Radish Kimchi	Bada (418)
162	August 23, 2014	Original Girl Groups Special	Lee Se-joon (Yurisangja)	Weeping Willow	Bada (418)
162	August 23, 2014	Original Girl Groups Special	Mose	I Can't Just Leave like This	Bada (418)
162	August 23, 2014	Original Girl Groups Special	Son Seung-yeon	Mapo Station	Bada (418)
162	August 23, 2014	Original Girl Groups Special	Bada	Cup of Coffee	Bada (418)
163	August 30, 2014	Million Seller Special	Ailee	Cocktail Love	Homme (437)
163	August 30, 2014	Million Seller Special	Hong Kyung-min	The Love of Neoanthropinae	Homme (437)
163	August 30, 2014	Million Seller Special	Davichi	Do You Know	Homme (437)
163	August 30, 2014	Million Seller Special	Kim Kyung-ho	Back to You (너에게로 또다시)	Homme (437)
163	August 30, 2014	Million Seller Special	Tae One	Don't Say Goodbye	Homme (437)
163	August 30, 2014	Million Seller Special	Seo In-young	Magic Castle	Homme (437)
163	August 30, 2014	Million Seller Special	DickPunks	Bobbed Hair	Homme (437)
164	September 6, 2014	Million Seller Special	Gummy feat. Jungyup (Clon)	Kungddari Shabara	Homme (437)
164	September 6, 2014	Million Seller Special	Uji (Bestie)	One Flew Over the Cuckoo' Nest	Homme (437)
164	September 6, 2014	Million Seller Special	Son Seung-yeon	For a Long Time After That	Homme (437)
164	September 6, 2014	Million Seller Special	Lee Ki-chan	The More I Love	Homme (437)
164	September 6, 2014	Million Seller Special	Kang Woo-jin	I Loved You	Homme (437)
164	September 6, 2014	Million Seller Special	Lee Se-joon (Yurisangja)	Swamp	Homme (437)
164	September 6, 2014	Million Seller Special	Homme	When I Stand in the Shade of a Tree	Homme (437)
165	September 13, 2014	Saturday NightHeat	Bada	I See It	Son Seung-yeon (431)
165	September 13, 2014	Saturday NightHeat	DIA	Don't Leave	Son Seung-yeon (431)
165	September 13, 2014	Saturday NightHeat	Kim Chang-yeol (DJ Doc)	By the Moonlit Window	Son Seung-yeon (431)
165	September 13, 2014	Saturday NightHeat	Kim So-hyun & Son Jun-ho	A Story of Lovers	Son Seung-yeon (431)
165	September 13, 2014	Saturday NightHeat	Fly to the Sky	Because of Love	Son Seung-yeon (431)
165	September 13, 2014	Saturday NightHeat	Nam Hyun-joon & Park Ae-ri	Life is Incomplete	Son Seung-yeon (431)
166	September 20, 2014	Saturday NightHeat	Song So-hee	Tomorrow	Son Seung-yeon (431)
166	September 20, 2014	Saturday NightHeat	JK Kim Dong-wook	I Should Sleep Now	Son Seung-yeon (431)
166	September 20, 2014	Saturday NightHeat	Serengeti	Beautiful	Son Seung-yeon (431)
166	September 20, 2014	Saturday NightHeat	Son Seung-yeon	I Can't Find You Nightingale	Son Seung-yeon (431)
166	September 20, 2014	Saturday NightHeat	BtoB	Tell Her	Son Seung-yeon (431)
166	September 20, 2014	Saturday NightHeat	Ali	I Ran into You	Son Seung-yeon (431)
166	September 20, 2014	Saturday NightHeat	Homme	Saturday Night is Nice	Son Seung-yeon (431)
167	October 4, 2014	Autumn Special	Ben	Brown Memory	Kim Kyung-ho (421)
167	October 4, 2014	Autumn Special	Hong Kyung-min feat. Hongdae Girls	My Old-Time Story	Kim Kyung-ho (421)
167	October 4, 2014	Autumn Special	Kim Young-ho	Autumn Love	Kim Kyung-ho (421)
167	October 4, 2014	Autumn Special	DickPunks	See You in the Sad Season	Kim Kyung-ho (421)
167	October 4, 2014	Autumn Special	Kim Kyung-ho	Red Dragonfly (고추잠자리)	Kim Kyung-ho (421)
167	October 4, 2014	Autumn Special	Son Seung-yeon	Love that Left in Autumn	Kim Kyung-ho (421)
167	October 4, 2014	Autumn Special	Bada	When Time Passes	Kim Kyung-ho (421)
168	October 11, 2014	Immortal Harmony: Love Songs	Kim Ba-da & Seomoon Tak	Mona Lisa	Yoon Min-soo & Shin Yong-jae
168	October 11, 2014	Immortal Harmony: Love Songs	The One & Son Seung-yeon	I Love You	Yoon Min-soo & Shin Yong-jae
168	October 11, 2014	Immortal Harmony: Love Songs	Sonya & Son Jun-ho	This is the Moment	Yoon Min-soo & Shin Yong-jae
168	October 11, 2014	Immortal Harmony: Love Songs	Tae Jin-ah & Jeok Woo	Beautiful Restriction	Yoon Min-soo & Shin Yong-jae
168	October 11, 2014	Immortal Harmony: Love Songs	Yoon Min-soo & Shin Yong-jae	Please	Yoon Min-soo & Shin Yong-jae
168	October 11, 2014	Immortal Harmony: Love Songs	Jung Dong-ha & Ali	Encounter	Yoon Min-soo & Shin Yong-jae
169	October 18, 2014	Michael Bolton	Moon Myung-jin	How Am I Supposed to Live without You	Sohyang (442)
169	October 18, 2014	Michael Bolton	Hyolyn (Sistar)	Missing You Now	Sohyang (442)
169	October 18, 2014	Michael Bolton	Seo Ji-an	A Love So Beautiful	Sohyang (442)
169	October 18, 2014	Michael Bolton	Ailee	Georgia on my Mind	Sohyang (442)
169	October 18, 2014	Michael Bolton	Lena Park	Completely	Sohyang (442)
169	October 18, 2014	Michael Bolton	Jay Park	When a Man Loves a Woman	Sohyang (442)
169	October 18, 2014	Michael Bolton	Sohyang	Lean on Me	Sohyang (442)
170	October 25, 2014	Trot	Kim Jong-seo	In the Air (허공) and Arirang (아리랑)	Im Tae-kyung (435)
170	October 25, 2014	Trot	Kim Jan-di	Crossing the Teary Hill of Bakdaljae	Im Tae-kyung (435)
170	October 25, 2014	Trot	V.O.S & SoReal	In Despair	Im Tae-kyung (435)
170	October 25, 2014	Trot	Im Tae-kyung feat. Paul Potts	Love	Im Tae-kyung (435)
170	October 25, 2014	Trot	Ben	Oh my Baby	Im Tae-kyung (435)
170	October 25, 2014	Trot	Teen Top	My Sister	Im Tae-kyung (435)
170	October 25, 2014	Trot	Boohwal	I'll Say Goodbye	Im Tae-kyung (435)
171	November 1, 2014	Legendary Folk Duos	Son Seung-yeon	The Light of Hope	Boohwal
171	November 1, 2014	Legendary Folk Duos	The Scenery Seen on Bicycle	Wedding Cake	Boohwal
171	November 1, 2014	Legendary Folk Duos	Park Ki-young	To You	Boohwal
171	November 1, 2014	Legendary Folk Duos	E.Sang	Someone Who Gives Me Happiness	Boohwal
171	November 1, 2014	Legendary Folk Duos	Ben	With Love	Boohwal
171	November 1, 2014	Legendary Folk Duos	Moon Myung-jin feat. Rapper Number 11	Rose	Boohwal
172	November 8, 2014	Legendary Folk Duos	Son Ho-young	Just Say It	Boohwal
172	November 8, 2014	Legendary Folk Duos	Ali feat. Kim Se-hwang (N.EX.T)	Bygone Love	Boohwal
172	November 8, 2014	Legendary Folk Duos	Jo Jung-chi, Eddy Kim, Jang Jae-in	You	Boohwal
172	November 8, 2014	Legendary Folk Duos	Wax	You are Lovely	Boohwal
172	November 8, 2014	Legendary Folk Duos	Boohwal feat. Youth Choir	The White Handkerchief	Boohwal
172	November 8, 2014	Legendary Folk Duos	Wheesung & Tae One	I Hate You	Boohwal
173	November 15, 2014	Fallen Stars in November	Kim Jin-ho	My Love by my Side	Moon Myung-jin (436)
173	November 15, 2014	Fallen Stars in November	Woong-san	Walking in the Rain Together	Moon Myung-jin (436)
173	November 15, 2014	Fallen Stars in November	Son Seung-yeon	Bohemian Rhapsody	Moon Myung-jin (436)
173	November 15, 2014	Fallen Stars in November	Cho Jang-hyuk	End of Love	Moon Myung-jin (436)
173	November 15, 2014	Fallen Stars in November	Kim Dong-myeong (Boohwal)	Who Cries?	Moon Myung-jin (436)
173	November 15, 2014	Fallen Stars in November	Ben	All You Need is Love	Moon Myung-jin (436)
173	November 15, 2014	Fallen Stars in November	Moon Myung-jin	In my Arms	Moon Myung-jin (436)
174	November 22, 2014	Song Chang-sik	Huh Gak	It's Love	Rose Motel (430)
174	November 22, 2014	Song Chang-sik	Sweet Sorrow	A Beautiful Day	Rose Motel (430)
174	November 22, 2014	Song Chang-sik	Kim Dong-myeong (Boohwal) feat. Park Wan-kyu	The Song of Sanga	Rose Motel (430)
174	November 22, 2014	Song Chang-sik	Dynamic Duo feat. Crush	A Man with a Flute	Rose Motel (430)
174	November 22, 2014	Song Chang-sik	Kim So-hyun & Son Jun-ho	Out the Window, It's Raining	Rose Motel (430)
174	November 22, 2014	Song Chang-sik	Cho Jang-hyuk feat. Skull	Why Are You Calling Me?	Rose Motel (430)
175	November 29, 2014	Song Chang-sik	S	Cigarette Girl	Rose Motel (430)
175	November 29, 2014	Song Chang-sik	Noel	We	Rose Motel (430)
175	November 29, 2014	Song Chang-sik	Son Seung-yeon & Kim Ki-lee	Toham Mountain	Rose Motel (430)
175	November 29, 2014	Song Chang-sik	Lee Ji-soo	The Rain and Me	Rose Motel (430)
175	November 29, 2014	Song Chang-sik	Rose Motel	She Might	Rose Motel (430)
175	November 29, 2014	Song Chang-sik	The Scenery Seen on Bicycle	My Guitar Story	Rose Motel (430)
176	December 6, 2014	Lee Bong Jo	Ali	Desert Island	S (427)
176	December 6, 2014	Lee Bong Jo	Lee Se-joon (Yurisangja) & Nam Young-joo	You	S (427)
176	December 6, 2014	Lee Bong Jo	Kim Dong-myeong (Boohwal)	Leave without a Word	S (427)
176	December 6, 2014	Lee Bong Jo	4Men	The Face I Long For	S (427)
176	December 6, 2014	Lee Bong Jo	Seo Ji-an	Stars	S (427)
176	December 6, 2014	Lee Bong Jo	Bada	The Night Fog	S (427)
177	December 13, 2014	Lee Bong Jo	Sweet Sorrow	Morning	S (427)
177	December 13, 2014	Lee Bong Jo	Jung Eun-ji (Apink)	Because of Love	S (427)
177	December 13, 2014	Lee Bong Jo	Park Ki-young	Class of Love	S (427)
177	December 13, 2014	Lee Bong Jo	S feat. Joe Kwanwoo	At the Flower Bed	S (427)
177	December 13, 2014	Lee Bong Jo	Hong Dae-kwang	Barefoot Youth	S (427)
177	December 13, 2014	Lee Bong Jo	TRAX & Zhou Mi	Despite your Smile	S (427)
178	December 20, 2014	Yang Hee-eun	JK Kim Dong-wook	Impossible Love	Sweet Sorrow (427)
178	December 20, 2014	Yang Hee-eun	Ali	Seven Daffodils	Sweet Sorrow (427)
178	December 20, 2014	Yang Hee-eun	Park Su-jin feat. Feeldog (Big Star)	White Magnolias	Sweet Sorrow (427)
178	December 20, 2014	Yang Hee-eun	S	Land of Happiness	Sweet Sorrow (427)
178	December 20, 2014	Yang Hee-eun	Son Ho-young & Kim Dong-jun (ZE:A)	Senoya Senoya	Sweet Sorrow (427)
178	December 20, 2014	Yang Hee-eun	Hong Kyung-min feat. Son Nan-yeong	Hangyeryeong	Sweet Sorrow (427)
178	December 20, 2014	Yang Hee-eun	Sweet Sorrow	About Love and its Loneliness	Sweet Sorrow (427)
179	December 27, 2014	Special Visit from Actors	Park Yeong-gyu	Una furtiva lagrima (L'elisir d'amore)	Kang Boo-ja
179	December 27, 2014	Special Visit from Actors	Joon Mi-sun & Son Jun-ho	Way Back Home	Kang Boo-ja
179	December 27, 2014	Special Visit from Actors	Im Ha-ryong	About Romance	Kang Boo-ja
179	December 27, 2014	Special Visit from Actors	Choi Jung-won	Musical Medley	Kang Boo-ja
179	December 27, 2014	Special Visit from Actors	You Min-sang & Kim Jun-hyun	You're the Only One	Kang Boo-ja
179	December 27, 2014	Special Visit from Actors	Kang Boo-ja	Sad Destiny	Kang Boo-ja

=== 2015 ===
List of episodes aired in 2015

Singers listed in order of performance.

Episode #	Broadcast Date	Legend or Theme	Guest Singers	Songs	Final Winner (Votes)
180	January 3, 2015	Songs of Hope Special	Jung Dong-ha	Live (사노라면)	Ulala Session (419)
180	January 3, 2015	Songs of Hope Special	Ben	A Goose's Dream (거위의 꿈)	Ulala Session (419)
180	January 3, 2015	Songs of Hope Special	The Barberettes	A Father's Youth (아빠의 청춘)	Ulala Session (419)
180	January 3, 2015	Songs of Hope Special	JK Kim Dong-wook	Get Up (일어나)	Ulala Session (419)
180	January 3, 2015	Songs of Hope Special	Buzz	To You (그대에게)	Ulala Session (419)
180	January 3, 2015	Songs of Hope Special	Lim Kim (Togeworl) & Eddy Kim	The Young Who Live Off Dreams (꿈을 먹는 젊은이)	Ulala Session (419)
180	January 3, 2015	Songs of Hope Special	Ulala Session	Bravo, My Life	Ulala Session (419)
181	January 10, 2015	Composer Kim Yeong-gwang	Lee Hyun	Seonhui's Bag (선희의 가방)	Kim Kyung-ho (428)
181	January 10, 2015	Composer Kim Yeong-gwang	Jeok Woo	A Girl's High School Days (여고 시절)	Kim Kyung-ho (428)
181	January 10, 2015	Composer Kim Yeong-gwang	Jung Dong-ha	Soft-hearted (마음 약해서)	Kim Kyung-ho (428)
181	January 10, 2015	Composer Kim Yeong-gwang	MAMAMOO	Wait A Minute (잠깐만)	Kim Kyung-ho (428)
181	January 10, 2015	Composer Kim Yeong-gwang	Hong Kyung-min	Love Is A Seed Of Tears (사랑은 눈물의 씨앗)	Kim Kyung-ho (428)
181	January 10, 2015	Composer Kim Yeong-gwang	Kim Kyung-ho	As Days Go By (날이 날이 갈수)	Kim Kyung-ho (428)
181	January 10, 2015	Composer Kim Yeong-gwang	Son Seung-yeon	Help Me Forget (잊게 해주오)	Kim Kyung-ho (428)
182	January 17, 2015	Musical Families Special	Seo Ji-an	Reminisce (회상)	Hong Kyung-min (425)
182	January 17, 2015	Musical Families Special	Son Seung-yeon	Flying Like A Bird (한마리 새가 되어)	Hong Kyung-min (425)
182	January 17, 2015	Musical Families Special	Kim Kyung-ho	We (파초)	Hong Kyung-min (425)
182	January 17, 2015	Musical Families Special	EXID	You Like Me, I Like You (너 나 좋아해 나 너 좋아해)	Hong Kyung-min (425)
182	January 17, 2015	Musical Families Special	Kim So-hyun & Son Jun-ho	Love (사랑이여)	Hong Kyung-min (425)
182	January 17, 2015	Musical Families Special	Lee Se-joon (Yurisangja)	A Cup of Tea (찻잔)	Hong Kyung-min (425)
182	January 17, 2015	Musical Families Special	Hong Kyung-min	The One Who Will Have To Leave (떠나야 할 그 사람)	Hong Kyung-min (425)
183	January 24, 2015	Lee Jang-hee	Park Ki-young	Goodbye, A Word That's Too Short (안녕이란 두 글자는 너무 짧죠)	No Brain (398)
183	January 24, 2015	Lee Jang-hee	Kwon In-ha	Mother's Lullaby (어머님의 자장가)	No Brain (398)
183	January 24, 2015	Lee Jang-hee	S	Goodbye (안녕)	No Brain (398)
183	January 24, 2015	Lee Jang-hee	Niel (Teen Top)	I Can't Quite Put My Finger On It (뭐라고 딱 꼬집어 얘기할 수 없어요)	No Brain (398)
183	January 24, 2015	Lee Jang-hee	No Brain	Love Is Such A Common Word (사랑이란 말은 너무너무 흔해)	No Brain (398)
183	January 24, 2015	Lee Jang-hee	The Barberettes	It's Way Past Midnight (자정이 훨씬 넘었네)	No Brain (398)
184	January 31, 2015	Lee Jang-hee	Lee Seok-hoon	I'll Give You Everything (나 그대에게 모두 드리리)	Han Ji-sang (431)
184	January 31, 2015	Lee Jang-hee	Buzz	It's You (그건 너)	Han Ji-sang (431)
184	January 31, 2015	Lee Jang-hee	Homme	Let's Now Forget (이젠 잊기로 해요)	Han Ji-sang (431)
184	January 31, 2015	Lee Jang-hee	Park Soo-jin	A Drink of Memories (한 잔의 추억)	Han Ji-sang (431)
184	January 31, 2015	Lee Jang-hee	Han Ji-sang	Lover (애인)	Han Ji-sang (431)
184	January 31, 2015	Lee Jang-hee	Jun In-hyuck	The Wanderer In The Rain (비의 나그네)	Han Ji-sang (431)
185	February 7, 2015	Yoo Seung-yeob	Lee Se-joon (Yurisangja)	White Dandelion (하얀 민들레)	Kim Kyung-ho (431)
185	February 7, 2015	Yoo Seung-yeob	Son Seung-yeon	Like a Swallow (제비처럼)	Kim Kyung-ho (431)
185	February 7, 2015	Yoo Seung-yeob	Seo Ji-an	I Miss You Even When I'm With You (보고 있어도 보고 싶은 그대)	Kim Kyung-ho (431)
185	February 7, 2015	Yoo Seung-yeob	Homme	As You Are Anyone (당신은 누구시길래)	Kim Kyung-ho (431)
185	February 7, 2015	Yoo Seung-yeob	Shannon	My Love Who Loved Me More Than I Loved Myself (나보다 더 나를 사랑하는 님이시여)	Kim Kyung-ho (431)
185	February 7, 2015	Yoo Seung-yeob	Kim Kyung-ho	The Winter Rose (겨울 장미)	Kim Kyung-ho (431)
185	February 7, 2015	Yoo Seung-yeob	Cho Jang-hyuk	Night Train (밤차)	Kim Kyung-ho (431)
186	February 14, 2015	Lee Young-hoon	S	In The Rain (빗속에서)	Yoon Min-soo (443)
186	February 14, 2015	Lee Young-hoon	Davichi	Goodbye, My Love (이별 이야기)	Yoon Min-soo (443)
186	February 14, 2015	Lee Young-hoon	MAMAMOO	Flying into the Night Sky (깊은 밤을 날아서)	Yoon Min-soo (443)
186	February 14, 2015	Lee Young-hoon	Moon Myung-jin	As Time Passes (세월 가면)	Yoon Min-soo (443)
186	February 14, 2015	Lee Young-hoon	Homme	Girl (소녀)	Yoon Min-soo (443)
186	February 14, 2015	Lee Young-hoon	Yoon Min-soo (Vibe)	Bygone Love (옛사랑)	Yoon Min-soo (443)
186	February 14, 2015	Lee Young-hoon	No Brain	As You Live In This World (이 세상 살아가다 보면)	Yoon Min-soo (443)
187	February 21, 2015	Traditional Folk Songs	Sohyang	Arirang Alone (홀로 아리랑)	Song So-hee (428)
187	February 21, 2015	Traditional Folk Songs	Nam Hyun-joon & Park Ae-ri	Milyang Arirang (밀양 아리랑)	Song So-hee (428)
187	February 21, 2015	Traditional Folk Songs	Jo Kwan-woo & Jo Tong-dal	Simcheongga (심청가) & Mother and Sister (엄마야 누나야)	Song So-hee (428)
187	February 21, 2015	Traditional Folk Songs	Sun Woo	Bird Bird, Blue Bird (새야 새야 파랑새야)	Song So-hee (428)
187	February 21, 2015	Traditional Folk Songs	Yang Dong-geun feat. Iron	Ongheya (옹헤야)	Song So-hee (428)
187	February 21, 2015	Traditional Folk Songs	DickPunks	Moon Song (달타령)	Song So-hee (428)
187	February 21, 2015	Traditional Folk Songs	Song So-hee	A Boatman's Song (자진 뱃노래)	Song So-hee (428)
188	February 28, 2015	Kim Soo-hee	Ulala Session	How Could You Do This To Me? (너무 합니다)	Park Ki-young (435)
188	February 28, 2015	Kim Soo-hee	Jo Jung-min	Train Station (정거장)	Park Ki-young (435)
188	February 28, 2015	Kim Soo-hee	Homme	Now Is Not The Time To Leave (지금은 가지 마세요)	Park Ki-young (435)
188	February 28, 2015	Kim Soo-hee	Son Seung-yeon	Lost Love (잃어버린 정)	Park Ki-young (435)
188	February 28, 2015	Kim Soo-hee	MAMAMOO	Passion Flower (정열의 꽃)	Park Ki-young (435)
188	February 28, 2015	Kim Soo-hee	Boohwal	Love Story (애모)	Park Ki-young (435)
188	February 28, 2015	Kim Soo-hee	Park Ki-young	Wound (멍에)	Park Ki-young (435)
189	March 7, 2015	Return of the Stars Special	Kim Tae-woo	Delilah (딜라일라)	Son Seung-yeon (405)
189	March 7, 2015	Return of the Stars Special	Sandeul (B1A4)	Cosmos Flower Song (코스모스 피어 있는 길)	Son Seung-yeon (405)
189	March 7, 2015	Return of the Stars Special	Ailee	Ambiguous (아리송해)	Son Seung-yeon (405)
189	March 7, 2015	Return of the Stars Special	K.Will	Farewell (이별)	Son Seung-yeon (405)
189	March 7, 2015	Return of the Stars Special	Ulala Session	I Heard a Rumor (풍문으로 들었)	Son Seung-yeon (405)
189	March 7, 2015	Return of the Stars Special	Son Seung-yeon	Wanderer (하숙생)	Son Seung-yeon (405)
190	March 14, 2015	Return of the Stars Special	Lee Jung	Gamsugwang (감수광)	S (423)
190	March 14, 2015	Return of the Stars Special	Kim Jong-seo	A Woman Outside the Window (창밖의 여자)	S (423)
190	March 14, 2015	Return of the Stars Special	Jung Dong-ha	Rain (빗물)	S (423)
190	March 14, 2015	Return of the Stars Special	S feat. Hyoyeon (Girls' Generation)	Weeds (잡초)	S (423)
190	March 14, 2015	Return of the Stars Special	Ali	Before It's Too Late (늦기 전에)	S (423)
190	March 14, 2015	Return of the Stars Special	Moon Myung-jin	Prayer (기도)	S (423)
191	March 21, 2015	Hometown of Stars Special	Yang Geum-seok	My Only Love is Gone (내 하나의 사람은 가고)	Oh Jung-hae (413)
191	March 21, 2015	Hometown of Stars Special	M&D (Kim Hee-chul & Kim Jungmo) feat. Bae Ki-sung	Spring Days of My Life (내 생에 봄날은)	Oh Jung-hae (413)
191	March 21, 2015	Hometown of Stars Special	Song Hae	Wandering Youth (유랑 청춘)	Oh Jung-hae (413)
191	March 21, 2015	Hometown of Stars Special	Oh Jung-hae	Tears of Mokpo (목포의 눈물)	Oh Jung-hae (413)
191	March 21, 2015	Hometown of Stars Special	Noh Joo-hyun	You Don't Bring Me Flowers	Oh Jung-hae (413)
191	March 21, 2015	Hometown of Stars Special	Kim Tae-woo & Shin Bo-ra	Come Back to Busan Harbor (돌아와요 부산항에)	Oh Jung-hae (413)
192	March 28, 2015	Songwriter Gil Ok-yoon	Buzz	I Can't Live Without You (그대 없이는 못 살아)	Kim Tae-woo & KIXS (434)
192	March 28, 2015	Songwriter Gil Ok-yoon	Jo Kwan-woo feat. Poppin Hyun-joon	Love, Once Again (사랑이여 다시 한)	Kim Tae-woo & KIXS (434)
192	March 28, 2015	Songwriter Gil Ok-yoon	Rumble Fish	Lights and Shadows (빛과 그림자)	Kim Tae-woo & KIXS (434)
192	March 28, 2015	Songwriter Gil Ok-yoon	S	When You Go to Nasung (나성에 가면)	Kim Tae-woo & KIXS (434)
192	March 28, 2015	Songwriter Gil Ok-yoon	Moon Myung-jin feat. DinDin	The Third Han River Bridge (제3 한강교)	Kim Tae-woo & KIXS (434)
192	March 28, 2015	Songwriter Gil Ok-yoon	Dreamgirls cast (Yoon Gong-ju, Park Eun-mi, Choi Hyun-sun, Uji)	Ask the Stars (별들에게 물어봐)	Kim Tae-woo & KIXS (434)
192	March 28, 2015	Songwriter Gil Ok-yoon	Kim Tae-woo & KIXS (DMTN)	Daybreak Rain (새벽비)	Kim Tae-woo & KIXS (434)
193	April 4, 2015	Baettaragi Lee Hye-min	MAMAMOO	The Way to Sampo (삼포로 가는 길)	Kim Tae-woo (428)
193	April 4, 2015	Baettaragi Lee Hye-min	Norazo	Wangsimni, 1959 (59년 왕십리)	Kim Tae-woo (428)
193	April 4, 2015	Baettaragi Lee Hye-min	Lee Jung & Youngji	Do You Like the Spring Rain So Much? (그댄 봄비를 무척 좋아하나요)	Kim Tae-woo (428)
193	April 4, 2015	Baettaragi Lee Hye-min	Ali	Under the Poplar Tree (포플러 나무 아래)	Kim Tae-woo (428)
193	April 4, 2015	Baettaragi Lee Hye-min	Park Ki-young	Swallowtail Butterfly (호랑나비)	Kim Tae-woo (428)
193	April 4, 2015	Baettaragi Lee Hye-min	Kim Tae-woo	Rain Is Falling On Your Small Flowerpot (그대 작은 화분에 비가 내리네)	Kim Tae-woo (428)
193	April 4, 2015	Baettaragi Lee Hye-min	15&	Between the Rain and a Teacup (비와 찻잔 사이)	Kim Tae-woo (428)
194	April 11, 2015	Songwriter Park Seong-hoon & Park Hyeon-jin	Ali	99.9	Nam Hyun-joon & Park Ae-ri (415)
194	April 11, 2015	Songwriter Park Seong-hoon & Park Hyeon-jin	Bae Ki-sung	Hwang Jini (황진이)	Nam Hyun-joon & Park Ae-ri (415)
194	April 11, 2015	Songwriter Park Seong-hoon & Park Hyeon-jin	Minah (Girl's Day)	The Guy Who Left Me (날 버린 남자)	Nam Hyun-joon & Park Ae-ri (415)
194	April 11, 2015	Songwriter Park Seong-hoon & Park Hyeon-jin	S	Jang Noksu (장녹수)	Nam Hyun-joon & Park Ae-ri (415)
194	April 11, 2015	Songwriter Park Seong-hoon & Park Hyeon-jin	Nam Sang-il	The Broken Clock (고장 난 벽시계)	Nam Hyun-joon & Park Ae-ri (415)
194	April 11, 2015	Songwriter Park Seong-hoon & Park Hyeon-jin	Nam Hyun-joon & Park Ae-ri	Treat Me Well While You Can (있을 때 잘해)	Nam Hyun-joon & Park Ae-ri (415)
195	April 18, 2015	Songwriter Park Seong-hoon & Park Hyeon-jin	Choi Jung-won	Love Is Not a Joke (사랑은 장난이 아니야)	Lee Jung (431)
195	April 18, 2015	Songwriter Park Seong-hoon & Park Hyeon-jin	Kim So-hyun & Son Jun-ho	Garden Balsam Crush (봉선화 연정)	Lee Jung (431)
195	April 18, 2015	Songwriter Park Seong-hoon & Park Hyeon-jin	Jo Jung-min	Love is a Butterfly (사랑은 나비인가 봐)	Lee Jung (431)
195	April 18, 2015	Songwriter Park Seong-hoon & Park Hyeon-jin	Son Ho-young	Shaken by the Wind, Wet from the Rain (바람에 흔들리고 비에 젖어도)	Lee Jung (431)
195	April 18, 2015	Songwriter Park Seong-hoon & Park Hyeon-jin	Lee Jung & NOLZA	Unconditional (무조건)	Lee Jung (431)
195	April 18, 2015	Songwriter Park Seong-hoon & Park Hyeon-jin	Hong Kyung-min & Yoon Gong-ju	The Rope of Love (사랑의 밧줄)	Lee Jung (431)
196	April 25, 2015	Seo Yoo-seok	Noel (Kang Kyun-sung & Jeon Woo-sung)	Shadow (그림자)	Boohwal (428)
196	April 25, 2015	Seo Yoo-seok	Sandeul (B1A4)	Be Blunt (뚝 잘라 말해)	Boohwal (428)
196	April 25, 2015	Seo Yoo-seok	Rumble Fish	Beautiful Lover (아름다운 사람)	Boohwal (428)
196	April 25, 2015	Seo Yoo-seok	Hwang Chi-yeul	The Wandering Cloud (구름 나그네)	Boohwal (428)
196	April 25, 2015	Seo Yoo-seok	Song So-hee	Sky (하늘)	Boohwal (428)
196	April 25, 2015	Seo Yoo-seok	Boohwal	Arirang Alone (홀로 아리랑)	Boohwal (428)
196	April 25, 2015	Seo Yoo-seok	Choi Jung-in	The Passing of Time (가는 세월)	Boohwal (428)
197	May 2, 2015	Seven Legends Special	Im Tae-kyung & Kim Mae-ja	Spring Days Are Passing (봄날은 간다)	Rose Motel & Ryu Bok-sung (439)
197	May 2, 2015	Seven Legends Special	Hwang Chi-yeul & Lee Saeng-kang	Chilgapsan Mountain (칠갑산)	Rose Motel & Ryu Bok-sung (439)
197	May 2, 2015	Seven Legends Special	Gummy & Song Hong-sub	Is Anyone There? (누구 없소?)	Rose Motel & Ryu Bok-sung (439)
197	May 2, 2015	Seven Legends Special	Park Ki-young & Shim Sung-rak	The First Rain (초우)	Rose Motel & Ryu Bok-sung (439)
197	May 2, 2015	Seven Legends Special	Rose Motel & Ryu Bok-sung	Friends Forever (영원한 친구)	Rose Motel & Ryu Bok-sung (439)
197	May 2, 2015	Seven Legends Special	Ali & Choi Sun-bae	My Lover Is Far Away (님은 먼 곳에)	Rose Motel & Ryu Bok-sung (439)
197	May 2, 2015	Seven Legends Special	Son Seung-yeon & Kim Duk-soo	Poor Gentleman (빈대떡 신사)	Rose Motel & Ryu Bok-sung (439)
198	May 9, 2015	English Pop Songs	JK Kim Dong-wook	When I Dream	Sohyang (416)
198	May 9, 2015	English Pop Songs	MIIII	Yesterday(미)	Sohyang (416)
198	May 9, 2015	English Pop Songs	Kang Hong-seok	Hound Dog	Sohyang (416)
198	May 9, 2015	English Pop Songs	Sohyang	Bridge over Troubled Water	Sohyang (416)
198	May 9, 2015	English Pop Songs	Jung Dong-ha	Heal the World	Sohyang (416)
198	May 9, 2015	English Pop Songs	Lee Se-joon (Yurisangja)	Let It Go	Sohyang (416)
198	May 9, 2015	English Pop Songs	Bada	My Heart Will Go On	Sohyang (416)
199	May 16, 2015	Family Special	Lee Hyun-kyung & Min Young-ki	We're in Love (사랑하는 우리)	Hwang Chi-yeul (425)
199	May 16, 2015	Family Special	Sul Woon-do & Lumin	The Song of the Wind (바람의 노래)	Hwang Chi-yeul (425)
199	May 16, 2015	Family Special	Lee Dong-woo	My Way	Hwang Chi-yeul (425)
199	May 16, 2015	Family Special	JK Kim Dong-wook & Yang Okhui	Encounter (만남)	Hwang Chi-yeul (425)
199	May 16, 2015	Family Special	Son Seung-yeon & Jung Gi-chun	Sleepless Rainy Night (잠 못 드는 밤 비는 내리고)	Hwang Chi-yeul (425)
199	May 16, 2015	Family Special	Hwang Chi-yeul	Father (아버지)	Hwang Chi-yeul (425)
200	May 23, 2015	Kim Soo-chul	Sonya	Always a Stranger (언제나 타인)	JK Kim Dong-wook (419)
200	May 23, 2015	Kim Soo-chul	Ulala Session	Life (세월)	JK Kim Dong-wook (419)
200	May 23, 2015	Kim Soo-chul	Jung Dong-ha	Love Them All (모두 다 사랑하리)	JK Kim Dong-wook (419)
200	May 23, 2015	Kim Soo-chul	Block B (Taeil & P.O)	Why Don't You Know? (왜 모르시나)	JK Kim Dong-wook (419)
200	May 23, 2015	Kim Soo-chul	JK Kim Dong-wook	The Flower that Stopped Blooming (못다 핀 꽃 한 송이)	JK Kim Dong-wook (419)
200	May 23, 2015	Kim Soo-chul	Nam Sang-il	Men Are Lonely (남자는 외로워)	JK Kim Dong-wook (419)
201	May 30, 2015	Kim Soo-chul	Garlixx	Get a Grip (정신 차려)	Moon Myung-jin (432)
201	May 30, 2015	Kim Soo-chul	Nam Hyun-joon & Park Ae-ri	Change of Heart (변심)	Moon Myung-jin (432)
201	May 30, 2015	Kim Soo-chul	Park Ki-young	Rain and Goodbye (비 그리고 이별)	Moon Myung-jin (432)
201	May 30, 2015	Kim Soo-chul	Hwang Chi-yeul	Tomorrow (내일)	Moon Myung-jin (432)
201	May 30, 2015	Kim Soo-chul	Moon Myung-jin	Parting (별리)	Moon Myung-jin (432)
201	May 30, 2015	Kim Soo-chul	Park Sang-min	Truly You (정녕 그대를)	Moon Myung-jin (432)
202	June 6, 2015	Lee Seung-chul	Hwang Chi-yeul	That Person (그 사람)	ALi (437)
202	June 6, 2015	Lee Seung-chul	Kim Tae-woo	Heeya (희야)	ALi (437)
202	June 6, 2015	Lee Seung-chul	Kim Yeon-ji	You Are Another Me (넌 또다른 나)	ALi (437)
202	June 6, 2015	Lee Seung-chul	Park Ki-young	Never Ending Story	ALi (437)
202	June 6, 2015	Lee Seung-chul	Homme	Today I Will (오늘도 난)	ALi (437)
202	June 6, 2015	Lee Seung-chul	Ali	No One Else (그런 사람 또 없습니다)	ALi (437)
202	June 6, 2015	Lee Seung-chul	Lee Hae-ri (Davichi) feat. Shin Yong-jae (4Men)	Don't Leave (떠나지마)	ALi (437)
203	June 13, 2015	Famous Song Covers	Sandeul (B1A4)	Come Back to Me Again (그대 내게 다시)	Lee Jung (414)
203	June 13, 2015	Famous Song Covers	JJY Band	I Heard a Rumor (풍문으로 들었소)	Lee Jung (414)
203	June 13, 2015	Famous Song Covers	Cho Jang-hyuk	Thorn Tree (가시나무)	Lee Jung (414)
203	June 13, 2015	Famous Song Covers	Kim Sun-kyung feat. Lee Jug-wang & Choi Hyeok-ju	Instinctively (본능적으로)	Lee Jung (414)
203	June 13, 2015	Famous Song Covers	Lee Jung	Only Longing Grows (그리움만 쌓이네)	Lee Jung (414)
203	June 13, 2015	Famous Song Covers	Son Seung-yeon	The Day I Met You (당신과 만난 이 날)	Lee Jung (414)
204	June 20, 2015	Famous Song Covers	Horan	The Meaning of You (너의 의미)	Jung Dong-ha (439)
204	June 20, 2015	Famous Song Covers	4Men	Once Again (한 번만 더)	Jung Dong-ha (439)
204	June 20, 2015	Famous Song Covers	T.L Crow	Lady in the Rain (빗속의 여인)	Jung Dong-ha (439)
204	June 20, 2015	Famous Song Covers	Seo Jung-hack	On the Flower Bed (꽃밭에서)	Jung Dong-ha (439)
204	June 20, 2015	Famous Song Covers	Jung Dong-ha	If You're Like Me (나와 같다면)	Jung Dong-ha (439)
204	June 20, 2015	Famous Song Covers	Lee Ji-hoon (S)	Sad Fate (슬픈 인연)	Jung Dong-ha (439)
205	June 27, 2015	Seven Divas Special	Kim Yeon-ji	Lost Umbrella (잃어버린 우산)	Seomoon Tak (442)
205	June 27, 2015	Seven Divas Special	Youngji	When Years Pass (세월이 가면)	Seomoon Tak (442)
205	June 27, 2015	Seven Divas Special	Ali	Delight (환희)	Seomoon Tak (442)
205	June 27, 2015	Seven Divas Special	Lee Hae-ri (Davichi)	That Only is My World (그것만이 내 세상)	Seomoon Tak (442)
205	June 27, 2015	Seven Divas Special	Son Seung-yeon feat. Ahn Kap-sung	You're Deep Inside My Heart (내 마음 깊은 곳의 너)	Seomoon Tak (442)
205	June 27, 2015	Seven Divas Special	Bada	The Dance in Rhythm (리듬 속에 그 춤을)	Seomoon Tak (442)
205	June 27, 2015	Seven Divas Special	Seomoon Tak	The Unknown World (미지의 세계)	Seomoon Tak (442)
206	July 4, 2015	Moon Hee-ok & Kim Ji-ae	Nam Sang-il	Last Name Is Kim (성은 김이요)	Kim Yeon-ji (423)
206	July 4, 2015	Moon Hee-ok & Kim Ji-ae	Lee Se-joon (Yurisangja)	Spinning Wheel (물레야)	Kim Yeon-ji (423)
206	July 4, 2015	Moon Hee-ok & Kim Ji-ae	Ulala Session	The Annoying One (얄미운 사람)	Kim Yeon-ji (423)
206	July 4, 2015	Moon Hee-ok & Kim Ji-ae	Hwang Chi-yeul	Because of Affections (정 때문에)	Kim Yeon-ji (423)
206	July 4, 2015	Moon Hee-ok & Kim Ji-ae	Buzz	A Secret Love (몰래 한 사랑)	Kim Yeon-ji (423)
206	July 4, 2015	Moon Hee-ok & Kim Ji-ae	Kim Yeon-ji	Men from the South, Women from the North (남남북녀)	Kim Yeon-ji (423)
206	July 4, 2015	Moon Hee-ok & Kim Ji-ae	T.L Crow	The Street of Love (사랑의 거리)	Kim Yeon-ji (423)
207	July 11, 2015	Goo Chang-mo	Shin Yong-jae (4Men)	The Moment I Saw You (처음 본 순간)	Kim So-hyun & Son Jun-ho (416)
207	July 11, 2015	Goo Chang-mo	Jessi feat. Yuk Jidam	Lonely, Lonely (외로워 외로워)	Kim So-hyun & Son Jun-ho (416)
207	July 11, 2015	Goo Chang-mo	Song So-hee	Lost (방황)	Kim So-hyun & Son Jun-ho (416)
207	July 11, 2015	Goo Chang-mo	Seomoon Tak	To My baby (아가에게)	Kim So-hyun & Son Jun-ho (416)
207	July 11, 2015	Goo Chang-mo	Rose Motel & Lee Sung-woo (No Brain)	Met You by Chance (어쩌다 마주친 그대)	Kim So-hyun & Son Jun-ho (416)
207	July 11, 2015	Goo Chang-mo	Kim So-hyun & Son Jun-ho	Cloud and Me (구름과 나)	Kim So-hyun & Son Jun-ho (416)
208	July 18, 2015	Goo Chang-mo	Min Young-ki	Mature As Much As You're Hurt (아픈 만큼 성숙해지고)	T.L Crow (436)
208	July 18, 2015	Goo Chang-mo	Hong Kyung-min feat. TheEastLight.	Open the Door (문을 열어)	T.L Crow (436)
208	July 18, 2015	Goo Chang-mo	Kim Yeon-ji	I Really Don't Know (난 정말 모르겠네)	T.L Crow (436)
208	July 18, 2015	Goo Chang-mo	T.L Crow	The Flower of My Heart (내 마음의 꽃) & It Wasn't That Long (길지 않은 시간이었네)	T.L Crow (436)
208	July 18, 2015	Goo Chang-mo	DK (December)	Far Away (아득히 먼 곳)	T.L Crow (436)
208	July 18, 2015	Goo Chang-mo	Huh Gak	Huinari (희나리)	T.L Crow (436)
209	July 25, 2015	Summer with Friends Special	Seo Yi-sook & DK (December)	Lie Down in the Sea (바다에 누워)	Yang Dong-geun & Jung Joon (429)
209	July 25, 2015	Summer with Friends Special	Lee Dong-wook & Oh Hyun-kyung	Wabderer (하숙생)	Yang Dong-geun & Jung Joon (429)
209	July 25, 2015	Summer with Friends Special	Jung Han-yong & Kim Seung-hwan	I Who Lost Love (사랑을 잃어버린 나)	Yang Dong-geun & Jung Joon (429)
209	July 25, 2015	Summer with Friends Special	Yang Dong-geun & Jung Joon	Oh Happy Day	Yang Dong-geun & Jung Joon (429)
209	July 25, 2015	Summer with Friends Special	Sleepy & Song Ji-eun (Secret)	Let's Go to the Beach (해변으로 가요)	Yang Dong-geun & Jung Joon (429)
209	July 25, 2015	Summer with Friends Special	Park Yeong-gyu & Lee Yung-yeong	Granada	Yang Dong-geun & Jung Joon (429)
210	August 1, 2015	Men of Immortal Songs	Jung Dong-ha	Someday (언젠가는)	Im Tae-kyung (425)
210	August 1, 2015	Men of Immortal Songs	Teen Top (Niel & Changjo) feat. (Kim Won-jun)	When Everyone's Asleep (모두 잠든 후에)	Im Tae-kyung (425)
210	August 1, 2015	Men of Immortal Songs	Buzz	After Love (사랑한 후에) & March (행진)	Im Tae-kyung (425)
210	August 1, 2015	Men of Immortal Songs	Im Tae-kyung	Hymn to Love (사랑의 찬가)	Im Tae-kyung (425)
210	August 1, 2015	Men of Immortal Songs	Moon Myung-jin	A Letter for the Heart (마음에 쓰는 편지)	Im Tae-kyung (425)
210	August 1, 2015	Men of Immortal Songs	Hwang Chi-yeul	The Sad Engagement Ceremony (슬픈 언약식)	Im Tae-kyung (425)
210	August 1, 2015	Men of Immortal Songs	Shin Yong-jae (4Men)	For a Thousand Days (천 일 동안)	Im Tae-kyung (425)
211	August 8, 2015	Songwriter Kim Jeong-tak	2BiC	White Night (하얀 밤에)	Lee Jung & NOLZA (429)
211	August 8, 2015	Songwriter Kim Jeong-tak	Ailee	Don't Say Words that Hurt (이젠 가슴 아픈 말 하지 말아요)	Lee Jung & NOLZA (429)
211	August 8, 2015	Songwriter Kim Jeong-tak	T.L Crow	Every Night (밤이면 밤마다)	Lee Jung & NOLZA (429)
211	August 8, 2015	Songwriter Kim Jeong-tak	Lee Jung & NOLZA	Spark (불티)	Lee Jung & NOLZA (429)
211	August 8, 2015	Songwriter Kim Jeong-tak	Melody Day	The Daughter of a Fisherman (어부의 딸)	Lee Jung & NOLZA (429)
211	August 8, 2015	Songwriter Kim Jeong-tak	Horan	Really (정말로)	Lee Jung & NOLZA (429)
211	August 8, 2015	Songwriter Kim Jeong-tak	Hwang Chi-yeul	I Guess the Night Is Still Dark (아직도 어두운 밤인가 봐)	Lee Jung & NOLZA (429)
212	August 15, 2015	Super Rookie Showdown	Nam Sang-il	White Butterfly (하얀 나비)	Hwang Chi-yeul (430)
212	August 15, 2015	Super Rookie Showdown	Seo Ji-an	The Wind Blows (바람이 분다)	Hwang Chi-yeul (430)
212	August 15, 2015	Super Rookie Showdown	Hwang Chi-yeul	You're Just Somewhere a Little Higher Than Me (나보다 조금 더 높은 곳에 니가 있을 뿐)	Hwang Chi-yeul (430)
212	August 15, 2015	Super Rookie Showdown	Hello Stranger	Pierrot Smiles at Us (삐에로는 우릴 보고 웃지)	Hwang Chi-yeul (430)
212	August 15, 2015	Super Rookie Showdown	T.L Crow	Cigarette Girl (담배 가게 아가)	Hwang Chi-yeul (430)
212	August 15, 2015	Super Rookie Showdown	Kim Yeon-ji	I Hope It Would Be That Way Now (이젠 그랬으면 좋겠네)	Hwang Chi-yeul (430)
212	August 15, 2015	Super Rookie Showdown	DK (December)	Forever (영원)	Hwang Chi-yeul (430)
213	August 22, 2015	Lyricist Ban Ya-wol	Oh Jung-hae	The Unfilial Child Cries (불효자는 웁니다)	Park Sang-min (427)
213	August 22, 2015	Lyricist Ban Ya-wol	Hwang Chi-yeul	Crossing the Bakdaljae Pass in Tears (울고 넘는 박달재)	Park Sang-min (427)
213	August 22, 2015	Lyricist Ban Ya-wol	Han Ji-sang	The Lady of the Cabin (산장의 여인)	Park Sang-min (427)
213	August 22, 2015	Lyricist Ban Ya-wol	Horan	Pure Love at 19 (열아홉 순정)	Park Sang-min (427)
213	August 22, 2015	Lyricist Ban Ya-wol	Park Sang-min feat. Park Ka-kyung & Park So-yoon	Father's Youth (아빠의 청춘)	Park Sang-min (427)
213	August 22, 2015	Lyricist Ban Ya-wol	Yeo Eun (Melody Day)	Virgin of the Soyang River (소양강 처녀)	Park Sang-min (427)
213	August 22, 2015	Lyricist Ban Ya-wol	Hong Kyung-min feat. Kim Se-hwang (N.EX.T) & Kim Young-suk	Miari Hill of Pain (단장의 미아리 고개)	Park Sang-min (427)
214	August 29, 2015	Adapted Songs with C'est Si Bon (Jo Young-nam & Yoon Hyung-joo)	MAMAMOO	Delilah (딜라일라)	2BiC (385)
214	August 29, 2015	Adapted Songs with C'est Si Bon (Jo Young-nam & Yoon Hyung-joo)	Rooftop House Studio	My Hometown Chungcheong-do (내 고향 충청도)	2BiC (385)
214	August 29, 2015	Adapted Songs with C'est Si Bon (Jo Young-nam & Yoon Hyung-joo)	Nam Hyun-joon & Park Ae-ri	Love Is in the Air (축제의 노)	2BiC (385)
214	August 29, 2015	Adapted Songs with C'est Si Bon (Jo Young-nam & Yoon Hyung-joo)	2BiC	Sealed With a Kiss (키스로 봉한 편지)	2BiC (385)
214	August 29, 2015	Adapted Songs with C'est Si Bon (Jo Young-nam & Yoon Hyung-joo)	Choi Jung-won	Now (이제는)	2BiC (385)
215	September 5, 2015	Adapted Songs with C'est Si Bon (Jo Young-nam & Yoon Hyung-joo)	Jo Jung-min	Oppa (오빠)	Kim Tae-woo (436)
215	September 5, 2015	Adapted Songs with C'est Si Bon (Jo Young-nam & Yoon Hyung-joo)	Ben	Our Story (우리들의 이야기)	Kim Tae-woo (436)
215	September 5, 2015	Adapted Songs with C'est Si Bon (Jo Young-nam & Yoon Hyung-joo)	Ali	Beautiful Things (아름다운 것들)	Kim Tae-woo (436)
215	September 5, 2015	Adapted Songs with C'est Si Bon (Jo Young-nam & Yoon Hyung-joo)	Bada	A Million Roses (백만 송이 장)	Kim Tae-woo (436)
215	September 5, 2015	Adapted Songs with C'est Si Bon (Jo Young-nam & Yoon Hyung-joo)	Hwang Chi-yeul	Love That Left with the Fallen Leaves (낙엽 따라 가 버린 사랑)	Kim Tae-woo (436)
215	September 5, 2015	Adapted Songs with C'est Si Bon (Jo Young-nam & Yoon Hyung-joo)	Kim Tae-woo	Life like a Waterwheel (물레방아 인생)	Kim Tae-woo (436)
216	September 12, 2015	Joo Young-hoon	Kim Yeon-ji	Musical (뮤지컬)	Seomoon Tak (424)
216	September 12, 2015	Joo Young-hoon	Kim Feel	Rhapsody of Sorrow (비의 랩소디)	Seomoon Tak (424)
216	September 12, 2015	Joo Young-hoon	DickPunks	G Cafe	Seomoon Tak (424)
216	September 12, 2015	Joo Young-hoon	Jo Jung-min	Festival	Seomoon Tak (424)
216	September 12, 2015	Joo Young-hoon	Lee Jung & NOLZA	Twist King	Seomoon Tak (424)
216	September 12, 2015	Joo Young-hoon	Seomoon Tak	Don't Give Up (포기하지 마)	Seomoon Tak (424)
217	September 19, 2015	Joo Young-hoon	Kim So-hyun & Son Jun-ho	Our Love like This (우리 사랑 이대로)	Bada (433)
217	September 19, 2015	Joo Young-hoon	Bada	Rose of Betrayal (배반의 장미)	Bada (433)
217	September 19, 2015	Joo Young-hoon	DK (December)	Talk of Dreams (꿈의 대화)	Bada (433)
217	September 19, 2015	Joo Young-hoon	EXID (Solji, LE & Hyelin)	Poison (포이즌)	Bada (433)
217	September 19, 2015	Joo Young-hoon	Rose Motel	Sad Dream (비몽)	Bada (433)
217	September 19, 2015	Joo Young-hoon	Homme	Lovable (사랑스러워)	Bada (433)
218	September 26, 2015	Chuseok Special	Han Suk-joon & JJY Band	Soul Mates (천생연분)	Cho U-jong & Lee Hyun-woo (383)
218	September 26, 2015	Chuseok Special	Chung Daeun & Teen Top (Niel & Changjo)	Seoul, Daejeon, Daegu, Busan (서울 대전 대구 부)	Cho U-jong & Lee Hyun-woo (383)
218	September 26, 2015	Chuseok Special	Do Kyung-wan & Youngji	The Rose That Blooms At Night (밤에 피는 장미)	Cho U-jong & Lee Hyun-woo (383)
218	September 26, 2015	Chuseok Special	Lee Jung-min & Hwang Chi-yeul	Pink Lipstick (분홍 립스틱)	Cho U-jong & Lee Hyun-woo (383)
218	September 26, 2015	Chuseok Special	Choi Seung-don & Hong Kyung-min	The Friend of Yeongil Bay (영일만 친구)	Cho U-jong & Lee Hyun-woo (383)
218	September 26, 2015	Chuseok Special	Cho U-jong & Lee Hyun-woo	Apartment (아파트)	Cho U-jong & Lee Hyun-woo (383)
219	October 3, 2015	Jo Su-mi	Song So-hee	If I Leave (나 가거든)	Im Tae-kyung (446)
219	October 3, 2015	Jo Su-mi	Kim Jong-seo	Champions	Im Tae-kyung (446)
219	October 3, 2015	Jo Su-mi	Paul Potts & Ali	Nostalgic Geumgangsan (그리운 금강산)	Im Tae-kyung (446)
219	October 3, 2015	Jo Su-mi	Park Ki-young	I Dreamt I Dwelt In Marble Halls	Im Tae-kyung (446)
219	October 3, 2015	Jo Su-mi	Son Jun-ho feat. Kim Sang-jin	Son of the Moon (달의 아들)	Im Tae-kyung (446)
219	October 3, 2015	Jo Su-mi	Im Tae-kyung feat. Go Young Bin, Yi Chang-wan & Kim Ki-sun	I Can't Say Goodbye (불인별곡)	Im Tae-kyung (446)
220	October 10, 2015	Lyricist Kim Sung-on	Kim Tae-woo	You Stand Outside the Door (문 밖에 있는 그대)	Kim Feel (437)
220	October 10, 2015	Lyricist Kim Sung-on	Lee Ki-chan	Red Dragonfly (고추잠자리)	Kim Feel (437)
220	October 10, 2015	Lyricist Kim Sung-on	Choi Jung-in feat. Miwoo	Mine (나만의 것)	Kim Feel (437)
220	October 10, 2015	Lyricist Kim Sung-on	Horan	Like an Indian Doll (인디언 인형처럼)	Kim Feel (437)
220	October 10, 2015	Lyricist Kim Sung-on	Son Seung-yeon	Traces (흔적)	Kim Feel (437)
220	October 10, 2015	Lyricist Kim Sung-on	Park Sang-min	The Song of the Wind (바람의 노래)	Kim Feel (437)
220	October 10, 2015	Lyricist Kim Sung-on	Kim Feel	Seoul, This Place (서울 이 곳은)	Kim Feel (437)
221	October 17, 2015	Boohwal	Seomoon Tak	Never Ending Story	Kim Ba-da (432)
221	October 17, 2015	Boohwal	Son Seung-yeon	Lonely Night	Kim Ba-da (432)
221	October 17, 2015	Boohwal	Kai	The More I Love (사랑할수록)	Kim Ba-da (432)
221	October 17, 2015	Boohwal	Moon Myung-jin	Heeya (희야)	Kim Ba-da (432)
221	October 17, 2015	Boohwal	U Sung-eun	Beautiful Truth (아름다운 사실)	Kim Ba-da (432)
221	October 17, 2015	Boohwal	Kim Ba-da	The Story of You and the Rain (비와 당신의 이야기)	Kim Ba-da (432)
221	October 17, 2015	Boohwal	Huh Gak	Reminiscence III (회상 III)	Kim Ba-da (432)
222	October 24, 2015	Shin Hae-chul	Ha Dong-kyun	Fly Chick (날아라, 병아리)	Hong Kyung-min (424)
222	October 24, 2015	Shin Hae-chul	Jung Dong-ha	Don't Look So Sad (슬픈 표정 하지 말아요)	Hong Kyung-min (424)
222	October 24, 2015	Shin Hae-chul	KIXS (DMTN)	Jazz Cafe (재즈 카페)	Hong Kyung-min (424)
222	October 24, 2015	Shin Hae-chul	K.Will	The Dream of a Freshwater Eel (민물장어의 꿈)	Hong Kyung-min (424)
222	October 24, 2015	Shin Hae-chul	Hong Kyung-min & N.EX.T	Goodbye (안녕)	Hong Kyung-min (424)
222	October 24, 2015	Shin Hae-chul	Son Seung-yeon	When Our Lives Are Almost Over (우리 앞의 생이 끝나갈 때)	Hong Kyung-min (424)
222	October 24, 2015	Shin Hae-chul	Tei	You're Deep Inside My Heart (내 마음 깊은 곳의 너)	Hong Kyung-min (424)
223	October 31, 2015	Bae Ho	Son Jun-ho	Goodbye at Midnight (영시의 이별)	MAMAMOO (404)
223	October 31, 2015	Bae Ho	Kyun Woo	Today I Confess (오늘은 고백한다)	MAMAMOO (404)
223	October 31, 2015	Bae Ho	Lee Se-joon (Yurisangja)	The Last Leaf (마지막 잎새)	MAMAMOO (404)
223	October 31, 2015	Bae Ho	Tei	Who Cries? (누가 울어)	MAMAMOO (404)
223	October 31, 2015	Bae Ho	MAMAMOO	Backwoods (두메산골)	MAMAMOO (404)
223	October 31, 2015	Bae Ho	Kim Hyung-joong	Foggy Jangchungdan Park (안개 낀 장충단 공원)	MAMAMOO (404)
224	November 7, 2015	Bae Ho	Bae Ki-sung	You (당신)	Park Ki-young (429)
224	November 7, 2015	Bae Ho	Horan	Love Lost in the Fog (안개 속으로 가버린 사랑)	Park Ki-young (429)
224	November 7, 2015	Bae Ho	Red Velvet (Seul-gi, Wendy & Joy)	Goodbye (안녕)	Park Ki-young (429)
224	November 7, 2015	Bae Ho	Park Ki-young	Goodbye (굿바이)	Park Ki-young (429)
224	November 7, 2015	Bae Ho	Kim Feel	The Eye of Gold (황금의 눈)	Park Ki-young (429)
224	November 7, 2015	Bae Ho	Lazybone	Turn Around at Samgakji (돌아가는 삼각지)	Park Ki-young (429)
225	November 14, 2015	An Chi-hwan	2BiC	On Which Star (우리가 어느 별에서)	ALi (430)
225	November 14, 2015	An Chi-hwan	Park Ki-young	Pine, Pine, Green Pine (솔아 솔아 푸르른 솔아)	ALi (430)
225	November 14, 2015	An Chi-hwan	Hong Kyung-min	Cricket (귀뚜라미)	ALi (430)
225	November 14, 2015	An Chi-hwan	Yoon Yeong-seok	Flutter (훨훨)	ALi (430)
225	November 14, 2015	An Chi-hwan	Luna (f(x))	Salt Doll (소금 인형)	ALi (430)
225	November 14, 2015	An Chi-hwan	JJY Band	If I (내가 만일)	ALi (430)
225	November 14, 2015	An Chi-hwan	Ali	People are More Beautiful Than Flowers (사람이 꽃보다 아름다워)	ALi (430)
226	November 21, 2015	Kim Jung-ho	Hwang Chi-yeul	White Butterfly (하얀 나비)	Kim Bo-kyung (426)
226	November 21, 2015	Kim Jung-ho	N.EX.T	A Girl Whose Name is Unknown (이름 모를 소녀)	Kim Bo-kyung (426)
226	November 21, 2015	Kim Jung-ho	Horan	Missing You (보고 싶은 마음)	Kim Bo-kyung (426)
226	November 21, 2015	Kim Jung-ho	Bada & Yoon Hyung-Ryul	The Truth About Love (사랑의 진실)	Kim Bo-kyung (426)
226	November 21, 2015	Kim Jung-ho	Kim Ba-da & Burstered	The Smile of a Lonesome Woman is Sad (고독한 여자의 미소는 슬퍼)	Kim Bo-kyung (426)
226	November 21, 2015	Kim Jung-ho	Kim Bo-kyung	Together in the Rain (빗속을 둘이서)	Kim Bo-kyung (426)
226	November 21, 2015	Kim Jung-ho	December	Little Bird (작은새)	Kim Bo-kyung (426)
227	November 28, 2015	Baek Ji-young	Son Seung-yeon	I Won't Love (사랑 안 해)	Hwang Chi-yeul (432)
227	November 28, 2015	Baek Ji-young	Ailee feat. Wheesung	That Woman (그 여자)	Hwang Chi-yeul (432)
227	November 28, 2015	Baek Ji-young	UP10TION	Dash	Hwang Chi-yeul (432)
227	November 28, 2015	Baek Ji-young	Stephanie	Choice (선택)	Hwang Chi-yeul (432)
227	November 28, 2015	Baek Ji-young	Han Ji-sang	Don't Forget (잊지 말아요)	Hwang Chi-yeul (432)
227	November 28, 2015	Baek Ji-young	Hwang Chi-yeul	Burden (부담)	Hwang Chi-yeul (432)
227	November 28, 2015	Baek Ji-young	Kim Feel	Like Being Shot (총 맞은 것처럼)	Hwang Chi-yeul (432)
228	December 5, 2015	The Celebrity Fans of Celebrities	Hong Kyung-min & Kim Jung-min	Endless Love (무한지애)	Im Se-jun & Jamie Jones (437)
228	December 5, 2015	The Celebrity Fans of Celebrities	Kim Shin-young & Shin Yu	Sea Bird (바다새)	Im Se-jun & Jamie Jones (437)
228	December 5, 2015	The Celebrity Fans of Celebrities	Cultwo & Lee Hyun	Celebrity (연예인)	Im Se-jun & Jamie Jones (437)
228	December 5, 2015	The Celebrity Fans of Celebrities	Sunwoo Yong-yeo & Nam Sang-il	Never (영영)	Im Se-jun & Jamie Jones (437)
228	December 5, 2015	The Celebrity Fans of Celebrities	Im Se-jun & Jamie Jones	Your Smile in My Memory (미소 속에 비친 그대)	Im Se-jun & Jamie Jones (437)
228	December 5, 2015	The Celebrity Fans of Celebrities	No Min-woo & Kim Tae-won	Mona Lisa (모나리자)	Im Se-jun & Jamie Jones (437)
229	December 12, 2015	g.o.d	Kim Feel	Road (길)	Son Seung-yeon (431)
229	December 12, 2015	g.o.d	GFRIEND	Love and Remember (사랑해 그리고 기어해)	Son Seung-yeon (431)
229	December 12, 2015	g.o.d	Shin Yong-jae (4Men) feat. Yubin (Wonder Girls)	To Mother (어머님께)	Son Seung-yeon (431)
229	December 12, 2015	g.o.d	Hwang Chi-yeul feat. Kim Yeon-ji	Lies (거짓말)	Son Seung-yeon (431)
229	December 12, 2015	g.o.d	Teen Top	The Place Where I Need You to Be (니가 있어여 할 곳)	Son Seung-yeon (431)
229	December 12, 2015	g.o.d	Son Seung-yeon feat. U Sung-eun, Miwoo, Ji Se-hee, Lee Ye-joon	One Candle (촛불 하나)	Son Seung-yeon (431)
230	December 19, 2015	Composer Jung Pung-song	Kim Dong-myeong (Boohwal)	Is It Hatred or Yearning? (미움인지 그리움인지)	Son Jun-ho feat. Kim Sang-jin & Park Jeong-taek (422)
230	December 19, 2015	Composer Jung Pung-song	Kim Yeon-ji	Fading Memory (갈색 추억)	Son Jun-ho feat. Kim Sang-jin & Park Jeong-taek (422)
230	December 19, 2015	Composer Jung Pung-song	Kim Jung-min	I Hate You (미워 미워 미워)	Son Jun-ho feat. Kim Sang-jin & Park Jeong-taek (422)
230	December 19, 2015	Composer Jung Pung-song	Son Jun-ho feat. Kim Sang-jin & Park Jeong-taek	Farewell (석별)	Son Jun-ho feat. Kim Sang-jin & Park Jeong-taek (422)
230	December 19, 2015	Composer Jung Pung-song	Kim Bo-kyung	Farewell Over a Teacup (찻잔의 이별)	Son Jun-ho feat. Kim Sang-jin & Park Jeong-taek (422)
230	December 19, 2015	Composer Jung Pung-song	Nam Sang-il	Vanish Into the Air (허공)	Son Jun-ho feat. Kim Sang-jin & Park Jeong-taek (422)
230	December 19, 2015	Composer Jung Pung-song	Lazybone	It Must Be a Raindrop (아마도 빗물이겠지)	Son Jun-ho feat. Kim Sang-jin & Park Jeong-taek (422)
231	December 26, 2015	The Immortal Big Match	Jung Dong-ha	I Miss You (보고 싶다)	Jung Dong-ha (418)
231	December 26, 2015	The Immortal Big Match	Son Seung-yeon	Is Anyone There? (누구 없소)	Jung Dong-ha (418)
231	December 26, 2015	The Immortal Big Match	Kim Jong-seo	Gethsemane (겟세마네)	Jung Dong-ha (418)
231	December 26, 2015	The Immortal Big Match	Sohyang	Everyone (여러분)	Jung Dong-ha (418)
231	December 26, 2015	The Immortal Big Match	Ali	Binari (비나리)	Jung Dong-ha (418)
231	December 26, 2015	The Immortal Big Match	Huh Gak	The Letter (편지)	Jung Dong-ha (418)
231	December 26, 2015	The Immortal Big Match	Hong Kyung-min	Everything in This World (세상만사)	Jung Dong-ha (418)

=== 2016 ===
List of episodes aired in 2016

Singers listed in order of performance.

Episode #	Broadcast Date	Legend or Theme	Guest Singers	Songs	Final Winner (Votes)
232	January 2, 2016	Songs of Hope Special	Lazybone	Tearful Tumen River (눈물 젖은 두만강)	Seomoon Tak (443)
232	January 2, 2016	Songs of Hope Special	Kim Jung-min	Reason for Existing (존쟁의 이유)	Seomoon Tak (443)
232	January 2, 2016	Songs of Hope Special	Park Ki-young	Nella Fantasia (넬라 판타지아)	Seomoon Tak (443)
232	January 2, 2016	Songs of Hope Special	Ali	Does Anyone Know This Person (누가 이 사람을 모르시나요)	Seomoon Tak (443)
232	January 2, 2016	Songs of Hope Special	Byul	Farewell (이 별)	Seomoon Tak (443)
232	January 2, 2016	Songs of Hope Special	The One feat. Jin Min-ho	Arirang All Alone (홀로 아리랑)	Seomoon Tak (443)
232	January 2, 2016	Songs of Hope Special	Seomoon Tak	Hand in Hand (손에 손잡고)	Seomoon Tak (443)
233	January 9, 2016	Married Couples Special	Kim Ji-woo & Raymon Kim	Unpredictable Life (알 수 없는 인생)	Nam Hyun-joon & Park Ae-ri (424)
233	January 9, 2016	Married Couples Special	Heo Gyu & Shin Dong-mi	Dream of a Doll (인형의 꿈)	Nam Hyun-joon & Park Ae-ri (424)
233	January 9, 2016	Married Couples Special	Kim So-hyun & Son Jun-ho	Phantom of the Opera (오페라의 유령)	Nam Hyun-joon & Park Ae-ri (424)
233	January 9, 2016	Married Couples Special	Park Jung-gyu & Jin Song-a	Love (사랑) & Musical (뮤지컬)	Nam Hyun-joon & Park Ae-ri (424)
233	January 9, 2016	Married Couples Special	Nam Hyun-joon & Park Ae-ri	Whale Hunting (고래사냥)	Nam Hyun-joon & Park Ae-ri (424)
233	January 9, 2016	Married Couples Special	Yoon Hyung-bin & Jung Kyung-mi	I'm Sorry (미안해요)	Nam Hyun-joon & Park Ae-ri (424)
234	January 16, 2016	Oh Seung-geun & Jo Hang-jo	December	The Boat Girl (처녀 뱃사공)	Park Sang-min (432)
234	January 16, 2016	Oh Seung-geun & Jo Hang-jo	Horan	If (만약에)	Park Sang-min (432)
234	January 16, 2016	Oh Seung-geun & Jo Hang-jo	Kim Ba-da	What's Wrong With My Age (내 나이가 어때서)	Park Sang-min (432)
234	January 16, 2016	Oh Seung-geun & Jo Hang-jo	Purfles	Be Nice While You Can (있을 때 잘해)	Park Sang-min (432)
234	January 16, 2016	Oh Seung-geun & Jo Hang-jo	Stephanie	You Leave (떠나는 임아)	Park Sang-min (432)
234	January 16, 2016	Oh Seung-geun & Jo Hang-jo	Park Sang-min	Lie (거짓말)	Park Sang-min (432)
234	January 16, 2016	Oh Seung-geun & Jo Hang-jo	Ulala Session	Find Love Find Life (사랑 찾아 인생 찾아)	Park Sang-min (432)
235	January 23, 2016	Kim Kwang-seok	Monni	Although I Loved You (사랑했지만)	Lee Se-joon (408)
235	January 23, 2016	Kim Kwang-seok	Roy Kim	At Around Thirty (서른 즈음에)	Lee Se-joon (408)
235	January 23, 2016	Kim Kwang-seok	Ryeowook	My Song (나의 노래)	Lee Se-joon (408)
235	January 23, 2016	Kim Kwang-seok	Son Seung-yeon	Stand Up (일어나)	Lee Se-joon (408)
235	January 23, 2016	Kim Kwang-seok	Lee Se-joon (Yurisangja)	Love That Hurt Too Much (너무 아픈 사랑은 사랑이 아니었음을)	Lee Se-joon (408)
235	January 23, 2016	Kim Kwang-seok	Lee Hae-ri (Davichi)	To You (너에게)	Lee Se-joon (408)
236	January 30, 2016	Kim Kwang-seok	Park Ki-young	Story of an Old Couple (어느 60대 노부부 이야기)	Kim Feel (443)
236	January 30, 2016	Kim Kwang-seok	Sweet Sorrow	With the Heart to Forget you (잊어야 한다는 마음으로)	Kim Feel (443)
236	January 30, 2016	Kim Kwang-seok	Haena	The Private's Letter (이등병의 편지)	Kim Feel (443)
236	January 30, 2016	Kim Kwang-seok	Stephanie	Becoming Dust (먼지가 되어)	Kim Feel (443)
236	January 30, 2016	Kim Kwang-seok	Homme	Those Days (그날들)	Kim Feel (443)
236	January 30, 2016	Kim Kwang-seok	Kim Feel	Wait for Me (기다려줘)	Kim Feel (443)
237	February 6, 2016	Lunar New Year Special	Park Sang-min	Nillili Mambo (늴리리 맘보)	Sweet Sorrow (439)
237	February 6, 2016	Lunar New Year Special	Son Seung-yeon	Dream (꿈)	Sweet Sorrow (439)
237	February 6, 2016	Lunar New Year Special	Stephanie	Lost Umbrella (잃어버린 우산)	Sweet Sorrow (439)
237	February 6, 2016	Lunar New Year Special	Byul	Come Back to Me Again (그대 내게 다시)	Sweet Sorrow (439)
237	February 6, 2016	Lunar New Year Special	Hong Kyung-min	Rose (장미)	Sweet Sorrow (439)
237	February 6, 2016	Lunar New Year Special	Sweet Sorrow	Saturday Night (토요일 밤에)	Sweet Sorrow (439)
237	February 6, 2016	Lunar New Year Special	Nam Hyun-joon & Park Ae-ri	During My Life (사노라면) & Song of Hope (사노라면)	Sweet Sorrow (439)
238	February 13, 2016	Choi Baek-ho	Son Jun-ho feat. Kim Sang-jin & Park Jeong-taek	Run (뛰어)	Lyn (437)
238	February 13, 2016	Choi Baek-ho	Nam Sang-il	About Romance (낭만에 대하여)	Lyn (437)
238	February 13, 2016	Choi Baek-ho	Park Ki-young	Right (그쟈)	Lyn (437)
238	February 13, 2016	Choi Baek-ho	Kim Bo-kyung	My Heart Has Nowhere (내 마음 갈 곳을 잃어)	Lyn (437)
238	February 13, 2016	Choi Baek-ho	Sweet Sorrow	The Night Before Army Enlistment (입영전야)	Lyn (437)
238	February 13, 2016	Choi Baek-ho	Lazybone	The Friend From Yeongil Bay (영일만 친구)	Lyn (437)
238	February 13, 2016	Choi Baek-ho	Lyn	Father (애비)	Lyn (437)
239	February 20, 2016	Oh Tae-ho	DickPunks	Farewell Unlike Farewell (이별 아닌 이별)	Jung Dong-ha (427)
239	February 20, 2016	Oh Tae-ho	Hong Ji-min	If Only I Began (나만 시작한다면)	Jung Dong-ha (427)
239	February 20, 2016	Oh Tae-ho	Sweet Sorrow	Humble Confession (화려하지 않은 고백)	Jung Dong-ha (427)
239	February 20, 2016	Oh Tae-ho	Jung Dong-ha	My Love By My Side (내 사랑 내 곁에)	Jung Dong-ha (427)
239	February 20, 2016	Oh Tae-ho	Choi Jung-in	Even If A Memorable Day Comes (기억날 그 날이 와도)	Jung Dong-ha (427)
239	February 20, 2016	Oh Tae-ho	Park Ki-young	A Night's Dream (하룻밤의 꿈)	Jung Dong-ha (427)
239	February 20, 2016	Oh Tae-ho	Lee Ye-joon	Between Love and Friendship (사랑과 우정 사이)	Jung Dong-ha (427)
240	February 27, 2016	Min Hae-kyung	Lee Ye-joon	No More Love (사랑은 이제 그만)	Stephanie (421)
240	February 27, 2016	Min Hae-kyung	Horan	My Heart Is By Your Side (내 마음 당신 곁으로)	Stephanie (421)
240	February 27, 2016	Min Hae-kyung	Ben	My Life Is Mine (내 인생은 나의 것)	Stephanie (421)
240	February 27, 2016	Min Hae-kyung	Moon Myung-jin feat. DinDin	You Are A Rose (그대 모습은 장미)	Stephanie (421)
240	February 27, 2016	Min Hae-kyung	MAMAMOO	Love Story Of A Girl (어느 소녀의 사랑 이야기)	Stephanie (421)
240	February 27, 2016	Min Hae-kyung	2BiC	Though You Are Smiling Like A Doll (그대는 인형처럼 웃고 잇지만)	Stephanie (421)
240	February 27, 2016	Min Hae-kyung	Stephanie	The Face I Miss (보고 싶은 얼굴)	Stephanie (421)
241	March 5, 2016	Kim Jong-seo	Chorus of Five (Lee Se-joon (Yurisangja), Stephanie, DK (December), Son Jun-ho & Kim Yeon-ji)	Beautiful Restriction (아름다운 구속)	Fierce Band (437)
241	March 5, 2016	Kim Jong-seo	Lee Ye-joon	I Am Going To Leave Becoming A Bird (새가 되어 가리)	Fierce Band (437)
241	March 5, 2016	Kim Jong-seo	Ali	Epilogue (에필로그)	Fierce Band (437)
241	March 5, 2016	Kim Jong-seo	Moon Myung-jin	Winter Rain (겨울비)	Fierce Band (437)
241	March 5, 2016	Kim Jong-seo	Fierce Band (Hong Kyung-min, Son Seung-yeon, Kim Ba-da, Jo Jung-min & Park Ga-Ram (DickPunks))	Plastic Syndrome (플라스틱 신드롬)	Fierce Band (437)
241	March 5, 2016	Kim Jong-seo	Park Ki-young	Still Now (그래도 이제는)	Fierce Band (437)
241	March 5, 2016	Kim Jong-seo	Seomoon Tak	You Do Not Answer (대답 없는 너)	Fierce Band (437)
242	March 12, 2016	Songwriter Park Chun-seok	Park Ki-young	Met The Man From The Lakeside (호반에서 만난 사람)	Im Tae-kyung (411)
242	March 12, 2016	Songwriter Park Chun-seok	Nam Sang-il	The Island Teacher (섬마을 선생님)	Im Tae-kyung (411)
242	March 12, 2016	Songwriter Park Chun-seok	Brave Girls	Mapo Terminal (마포종점)	Im Tae-kyung (411)
242	March 12, 2016	Songwriter Park Chun-seok	Im Tae-kyung	I Can Not Forget (못 잊어)	Im Tae-kyung (411)
242	March 12, 2016	Songwriter Park Chun-seok	Eric Nam	Separation of Airport (공항의 이별)	Im Tae-kyung (411)
242	March 12, 2016	Songwriter Park Chun-seok	Kim Jung-min	Should Have A Beautiful Heart (마음이 고와야지)	Im Tae-kyung (411)
243	March 19, 2016	Songwriter Park Chun-seok	Son Jun-ho feat. Kim Sang-jin & Park Jeong-taek	Empty Glass (빈잔)	Kim Kyung-ho (442)
243	March 19, 2016	Songwriter Park Chun-seok	GFRIEND	The Thorn Birds (가시나무새)	Kim Kyung-ho (442)
243	March 19, 2016	Songwriter Park Chun-seok	Kim Tae-woo	Heartbreakingly (가슴 아프게)	Kim Kyung-ho (442)
243	March 19, 2016	Songwriter Park Chun-seok	Big Brain	Turn Waterwheel (물레방아 도는데)	Kim Kyung-ho (442)
243	March 19, 2016	Songwriter Park Chun-seok	Stephanie	Elegy of Twilight (황혼의 엘레지)	Kim Kyung-ho (442)
243	March 19, 2016	Songwriter Park Chun-seok	Kim Kyung-ho	Early Rain (초우)	Kim Kyung-ho (442)
244	March 26, 2016	Actors Special	Park Jun-gyu feat. Park Jong-chan	You Can Do It (넌 할 수 있어)	Kim Seung-woo (419)
244	March 26, 2016	Actors Special	Lee Ah-hyun	Sad Fate (슬픈 인연)	Kim Seung-woo (419)
244	March 26, 2016	Actors Special	Im Chae-moo	A Song For My Wife (아내에게 바치는 노래)	Kim Seung-woo (419)
244	March 26, 2016	Actors Special	Park Jun-geum feat. Bae Da-hae	After The Night (이 밤이 지나면)	Kim Seung-woo (419)
244	March 26, 2016	Actors Special	Kim Ji-woo feat. Kang Woung-gon & Oh Ji-young	It's Raining Men (하늘에서 남자들이 비처럼 내려와)	Kim Seung-woo (419)
244	March 26, 2016	Actors Special	Kim Seung-woo feat. Choi Ho-Joong, Yun Da-yeong & Lee Seung-yeon	Youth (청춘) & Don't Worry, My Dear (걱정 말아요, 그대)	Kim Seung-woo (419)
245	April 2, 2016	Composer Ha Kwang-hoon	Sandeul (B1A4)	I'll Give You The Love I Have Left (내게 남은 사랑을 드릴게요)	Lazybone (435)
245	April 2, 2016	Composer Ha Kwang-hoon	Jung Dong-ha	Swamp (늪)	Lazybone (435)
245	April 2, 2016	Composer Ha Kwang-hoon	Park Sang-min	Promise (약속)	Lazybone (435)
245	April 2, 2016	Composer Ha Kwang-hoon	Kangnam feat. Boi B	Becoming Alone (홀로 된다는 것)	Lazybone (435)
245	April 2, 2016	Composer Ha Kwang-hoon	Lim Jeong-hee	It's Only Love (사랑일 뿐야)	Lazybone (435)
245	April 2, 2016	Composer Ha Kwang-hoon	Lazybone	Friends Like Rest (휴식 같은 핀구)	Lazybone (435)
245	April 2, 2016	Composer Ha Kwang-hoon	Hong Ji-min	To You Again (너에게로 쪼자시)	Lazybone (435)
246	April 9, 2016	Park In-hee	V.O.S	A Promise (약속)	Kim So-hyun & Son Jun-ho (417)
246	April 9, 2016	Park In-hee	Park Ki-young	As Time Passes (세월이 가면)	Kim So-hyun & Son Jun-ho (417)
246	April 9, 2016	Park In-hee	Nam Kyeong-ju & Lee Hyun-woo	Wanderer (방랑자)	Kim So-hyun & Son Jun-ho (417)
246	April 9, 2016	Park In-hee	Kim So-hyun & Son Jun-ho	Between The Missed Ones (그리운 사람끼리)	Kim So-hyun & Son Jun-ho (417)
246	April 9, 2016	Park In-hee	Jatanpung	Spring Comes The Pathway (봄이 오는 소리)	Kim So-hyun & Son Jun-ho (417)
246	April 9, 2016	Park In-hee	Son Seung-yeon	White Shell (하얀 조가비)	Kim So-hyun & Son Jun-ho (417)
246	April 9, 2016	Park In-hee	Lee Se-joon (Yurisangja)	Fire in the Open Air (모닥불)	Kim So-hyun & Son Jun-ho (417)
247	April 16, 2016	Lyricist Kim Dong-chan	MATILDA	Garden Balsam Feelings (봉선화 연정)	Kim Kyung-ho (421)
247	April 16, 2016	Lyricist Kim Dong-chan	Kim Kyung-ho	Sling (돌팔매)	Kim Kyung-ho (421)
247	April 16, 2016	Lyricist Kim Dong-chan	U Sung-eun	Four Beats (네 박자)	Kim Kyung-ho (421)
247	April 16, 2016	Lyricist Kim Dong-chan	Kim Tae-woo	Fire of Love (사랑의 모닥불)	Kim Kyung-ho (421)
247	April 16, 2016	Lyricist Kim Dong-chan	Bae Da-hae	Label of Love (사랑의 이름표)	Kim Kyung-ho (421)
247	April 16, 2016	Lyricist Kim Dong-chan	Song So-hee	Love And Seasons (사랑과 계절)	Kim Kyung-ho (421)
247	April 16, 2016	Lyricist Kim Dong-chan	Son Jun-ho feat. Kim Sang-jin	Nest (둥지)	Kim Kyung-ho (421)
248	April 23, 2016	Spring Special	Annyeongbada feat. EZ (Ggotjam Project)	Cocktail Love (칵테일 사랑)	No Brain (439)
248	April 23, 2016	Spring Special	Ali	Spring Rain (봄비)	No Brain (439)
248	April 23, 2016	Spring Special	Bae Da-hae	Rose (장미)	No Brain (439)
248	April 23, 2016	Spring Special	Nam Sang-il	Like a Swallow (제비처럼)	No Brain (439)
248	April 23, 2016	Spring Special	Kim Jung-min	Spring Rain (봄비)	No Brain (439)
248	April 23, 2016	Spring Special	Lyn	The Wild Rose (찔레꽃)	No Brain (439)
248	April 23, 2016	Spring Special	No Brain	Love Grass (풀잎사랑)	No Brain (439)
249	April 30, 2016	Yoon Soo-il	Bae Da-hae feat. Royal Pirates	Anything But Love (사랑만은 않겠어요)	MAMAMOO (433)
249	April 30, 2016	Yoon Soo-il	Kangnam	Apartment (아파트)	MAMAMOO (433)
249	April 30, 2016	Yoon Soo-il	Clazziquai	Beautiful (아름다워)	MAMAMOO (433)
249	April 30, 2016	Yoon Soo-il	Kim Jong-seo & Hong Kyung-min feat. Romantic Punch	Second Home (제2의 고향)	MAMAMOO (433)
249	April 30, 2016	Yoon Soo-il	MAMAMOO	Wonderful Confession (황홀한 고벡)	MAMAMOO (433)
249	April 30, 2016	Yoon Soo-il	Lim Jeong-hee	Memory (추억)	MAMAMOO (433)
249	April 30, 2016	Yoon Soo-il	Rose Motel	Don't Leave (떠나지마)	MAMAMOO (433)
250	May 7, 2016	Lyricist Kang Eun-kyung	Kim Ba-da	Can't Have You (가질 수 앖는 너)	Son Seung-yeon (421)
250	May 7, 2016	Lyricist Kang Eun-kyung	VIXX	The Last Match (마지막 승부)	Son Seung-yeon (421)
250	May 7, 2016	Lyricist Kang Eun-kyung	Hong Dae-kwang	Do You Know (아시나요)	Son Seung-yeon (421)
250	May 7, 2016	Lyricist Kang Eun-kyung	Son Seung-yeon	Forbidden Love (금지된 사랑)	Son Seung-yeon (421)
250	May 7, 2016	Lyricist Kang Eun-kyung	Nam Hyun-joon & Park Ae-ri	If I Leave (나가거든)	Son Seung-yeon (421)
250	May 7, 2016	Lyricist Kang Eun-kyung	Kim Yeon-ji	My Own Grief (나만의 슬픔)	Son Seung-yeon (421)
250	May 7, 2016	Lyricist Kang Eun-kyung	Nunsense II (Park Hae-mi, Lee Tae-won, Ryu Su-hwa) feat. DinDin	Murphy's Law (머피의 법칙)	Son Seung-yeon (421)
251	May 14, 2016	Month of Gratitude Special	Shin Yeon-ah (Big Mama) & Lee Dong-woo	In My Dream (꿈에)	Choi Baek-ho & Lyn (439)
251	May 14, 2016	Month of Gratitude Special	Jeon In-kwon & Lee Hi	It's Only My World (그것만이 내 세상)	Choi Baek-ho & Lyn (439)
251	May 14, 2016	Month of Gratitude Special	Han Pa-so & Park Ki-young	Rose of Betrayal (배반의 장미)	Choi Baek-ho & Lyn (439)
251	May 14, 2016	Month of Gratitude Special	Ahn Sook-sun & Nam Sang-il	Heungbuga (훙보가)	Choi Baek-ho & Lyn (439)
251	May 14, 2016	Month of Gratitude Special	Jung Hoon-hee & Yoon Hee-seok	Kimchi Blues (김치 빌루스)	Choi Baek-ho & Lyn (439)
251	May 14, 2016	Month of Gratitude Special	Choi Baek-ho & Lyn	Confined (멍에)	Choi Baek-ho & Lyn (439)
252	May 21, 2016	Choi Kyung-soo & Ham Jung-a	Son Jun-ho	Two Shadows in the Fog (안개 속의 구 그림자)	Kim Jang-hoon (428)
252	May 21, 2016	Choi Kyung-soo & Ham Jung-a	Kim Hyung-joong	If I Had Loved Someone (내게도 사랑이)	Kim Jang-hoon (428)
252	May 21, 2016	Choi Kyung-soo & Ham Jung-a	Kangnam	Thing Called Happiness (헹복이란)	Kim Jang-hoon (428)
252	May 21, 2016	Choi Kyung-soo & Ham Jung-a	December	Can You Return (돌려줄 수 없나요)	Kim Jang-hoon (428)
252	May 21, 2016	Choi Kyung-soo & Ham Jung-a	Park Ki-young	Heard It Through the Grapevine (풍문으로 들었소)	Kim Jang-hoon (428)
252	May 21, 2016	Choi Kyung-soo & Ham Jung-a	Twice	Y.M.C.A.	Kim Jang-hoon (428)
252	May 21, 2016	Choi Kyung-soo & Ham Jung-a	Kim Jang-hoon	Unacceptable (아니야)	Kim Jang-hoon (428)
253	May 28, 2016	Composer Baek Yeong-ho	Kim Bo-kyung	Sorrowful Serenade (추억의 소야곡)	Song So-hee (393)
253	May 28, 2016	Composer Baek Yeong-ho	Boohwal	Journey (여로)	Song So-hee (393)
253	May 28, 2016	Composer Baek Yeong-ho	Song So-hee	Haeundae Elegy (해운대 엘레지)	Song So-hee (393)
253	May 28, 2016	Composer Baek Yeong-ho	Homme	I Will Confess Today (오늘은 고벡한다)	Song So-hee (393)
253	May 28, 2016	Composer Baek Yeong-ho	Kim Tae-woo	Camellia Lady (동백 아가씨)	Song So-hee (393)
253	May 28, 2016	Composer Baek Yeong-ho	Park Mi-kyung	Lady (아씨)	Song So-hee (393)
253	May 28, 2016	Composer Baek Yeong-ho	Sam Kim	Chupung Pass (추풍령)	Song So-hee (393)
254	June 4, 2016	Lee Hyun-woo & Kim Jung-min	Lim Jeong-hee	The Day After You Left (헤어진 다음날)	V.O.S (441)
254	June 4, 2016	Lee Hyun-woo & Kim Jung-min	Seomoon Tak	Endless Love (무한지애)	V.O.S (441)
254	June 4, 2016	Lee Hyun-woo & Kim Jung-min	Royal Pirates	I Have to Forget You (슬픔 속에 그댈 지워야만 해)	V.O.S (441)
254	June 4, 2016	Lee Hyun-woo & Kim Jung-min	Hong Kyung-min	Sad Promise (실픈 언약식)	V.O.S (441)
254	June 4, 2016	Lee Hyun-woo & Kim Jung-min	Jung Dong-ha	Boom Boom Boom (붐붐붐)	V.O.S (441)
254	June 4, 2016	Lee Hyun-woo & Kim Jung-min	Woohyun (Infinite)	Last Promise (마지막 약속)	V.O.S (441)
254	June 4, 2016	Lee Hyun-woo & Kim Jung-min	V.O.S	Dream (꿈)	V.O.S (441)
255	June 11, 2016	Hong Seo-bum	Kim Ji-woo feat. Osina, Kang Woung-gon	My Love to You (내 사랑 투유)	Rose Motel (435)
255	June 11, 2016	Hong Seo-bum	Muzie	A Prayer of Bereft Leftovers (가난한 연인들의 가도)	Rose Motel (435)
255	June 11, 2016	Hong Seo-bum	Clazziquai	The Night You Left (그대 떠난 이 밤에)	Rose Motel (435)
255	June 11, 2016	Hong Seo-bum	I.O.I	It's Fire Play (불놀이야)	Rose Motel (435)
255	June 11, 2016	Hong Seo-bum	Son Seung-yeon	Want Ad (구인광고)	Rose Motel (435)
255	June 11, 2016	Hong Seo-bum	Rose Motel	Kim Satgat (감삿갓)	Rose Motel (435)
255	June 11, 2016	Hong Seo-bum	Lee Su-hyeon (Akdong Musician)	I Did Not Want Love From You (나는 당신께 사랑을 원하지 않맜어요)	Rose Motel (435)
256	June 18, 2016	Legendary harmony with Lee Seung-chul	Kim Feel	Don't Tell Me Goodbye (안녕이라고 말하지마)	Lee Hae-ri (439)
256	June 18, 2016	Legendary harmony with Lee Seung-chul	Son Ho-young	My Love	Lee Hae-ri (439)
256	June 18, 2016	Legendary harmony with Lee Seung-chul	Jung Eun-ji (Apink)	Destiny (인연)	Lee Hae-ri (439)
256	June 18, 2016	Legendary harmony with Lee Seung-chul	Teen Top (Niel & Changjo)	Even Today (오늘도 난)	Lee Hae-ri (439)
256	June 18, 2016	Legendary harmony with Lee Seung-chul	Choi Jung-in	Western Sky (사쪽 하늘)	Lee Hae-ri (439)
256	June 18, 2016	Legendary harmony with Lee Seung-chul	Lee Hae-ri (Davichi)	Jasmine (말리꽃)	Lee Hae-ri (439)
257	June 25, 2016	Memorial Day Special	Lazybone	To the Land of Happiness (행복의 나라로)	Lee Yeong-hyeon (429)
257	June 25, 2016	Memorial Day Special	Kim Tae-woo	The Land of the Morning Calm (아침의 나라에서)	Lee Yeong-hyeon (429)
257	June 25, 2016	Memorial Day Special	JK Kim Dong-wook	Holy Arirang (홀로 아리랑)	Lee Yeong-hyeon (429)
257	June 25, 2016	Memorial Day Special	Ali	Morning Dew (아침 이슬)	Lee Yeong-hyeon (429)
257	June 25, 2016	Memorial Day Special	Kai	Wood Monument (비목)	Lee Yeong-hyeon (429)
257	June 25, 2016	Memorial Day Special	Park Ki-young	Coordination (조율)	Lee Yeong-hyeon (429)
257	June 25, 2016	Memorial Day Special	Lee Yeong-hyeon	Beautiful Land (아름다운 나라)	Lee Yeong-hyeon (429)
258	July 2, 2016	First Half of 2016 Winners	Kim Kyung-ho	Be Mine Forever (영원히 내게)	Kim So-hyun & Son Jun-ho (431)
258	July 2, 2016	First Half of 2016 Winners	Nam Hyun-joon & Park Ae-ri	Dear Friend (친구여)	Kim So-hyun & Son Jun-ho (431)
258	July 2, 2016	First Half of 2016 Winners	Kim Jang-hoon	Red Sunset Glow (붉은 노을)	Kim So-hyun & Son Jun-ho (431)
258	July 2, 2016	First Half of 2016 Winners	Kim So-hyun & Son Jun-ho	Memory (from musical Cats (캣츠))	Kim So-hyun & Son Jun-ho (431)
258	July 2, 2016	First Half of 2016 Winners	Seomoon Tak	Beautiful Rivers and Mountains (아름다운 강산)	Kim So-hyun & Son Jun-ho (431)
258	July 2, 2016	First Half of 2016 Winners	Rose Motel	Let's Go To The Beach (해변으로 가요)	Kim So-hyun & Son Jun-ho (431)
258	July 2, 2016	First Half of 2016 Winners	Son Seung-yeon	Remember (기억해 줘)	Kim So-hyun & Son Jun-ho (431)
259	July 9, 2016	Yang Soo-kyung	Ali	Avoidance (외면)	Moon Myung-jin (413)
259	July 9, 2016	Yang Soo-kyung	The Lush	When Tomorrow Comes (내일이 오면)	Moon Myung-jin (413)
259	July 9, 2016	Yang Soo-kyung	Muzie	Where is the End of Goodbye (이별의 끝은 어디인가요)	Moon Myung-jin (413)
259	July 9, 2016	Yang Soo-kyung	No Brain	Love is a Cold Temptation (사랑은 차가운 유혹)	Moon Myung-jin (413)
259	July 9, 2016	Yang Soo-kyung	Woohyun (Infinite)	An End I Do Not Understand (알 수 없는 이별)	Moon Myung-jin (413)
259	July 9, 2016	Yang Soo-kyung	Moon Myung-jin	I Can't Bear To See You (바라볼 수 없는 그대)	Moon Myung-jin (413)
260	July 16, 2016	Yang Soo-kyung	Jung Dong-ha	Where Are You? (당신은 어디에 있나요)	Lee Yeong-hyeon (434)
260	July 16, 2016	Yang Soo-kyung	KCM	Destiny (인연)	Lee Yeong-hyeon (434)
260	July 16, 2016	Yang Soo-kyung	Yoon Soo-hyun	I Want To Forget (잊을래)	Lee Yeong-hyeon (434)
260	July 16, 2016	Yang Soo-kyung	Solji (EXID)	Love Is Like Rain Outside My Window (사랑은 창밖에 빗물 같아요)	Lee Yeong-hyeon (434)
260	July 16, 2016	Yang Soo-kyung	Lee Yeong-hyeon	What I Couldn't Say (못다 한 고백)	Lee Yeong-hyeon (434)
260	July 16, 2016	Yang Soo-kyung	Ben	You (그대는)	Lee Yeong-hyeon (434)
261	July 23, 2016	Summer story with friends	Sohyang & JK Kim Dong-wook	Childish Adult (어른 아이)	Vibe (437)
261	July 23, 2016	Summer story with friends	Hong Kyung-min & Cha Tae-hyun	I Wait Everyday (매일 매일 기다려)	Vibe (437)
261	July 23, 2016	Summer story with friends	Yangpa & Sam Kim	Because I Love You (사랑하기 때문에)	Vibe (437)
261	July 23, 2016	Summer story with friends	Vibe	I Want To Cry (울고 싶어라)	Vibe (437)
261	July 23, 2016	Summer story with friends	Nam Geong-ju & Choi Jung-won	Almost Paradise	Vibe (437)
261	July 23, 2016	Summer story with friends	Kim Tae-won & Kim Jong-seo	Memory III (회상 III)	Vibe (437)
262	July 30, 2016	Songwriter Ahn Chi-haeng	Hong Kyung-min	Oh, Wind (아 바람이여)	Lim Jeong-hee (432)
262	July 30, 2016	Songwriter Ahn Chi-haeng	No Brain	Paulownia Leaf (오동잎)	Lim Jeong-hee (432)
262	July 30, 2016	Songwriter Ahn Chi-haeng	Lovelyz	Yeongdong Blues (영동 부르스)	Lim Jeong-hee (432)
262	July 30, 2016	Songwriter Ahn Chi-haeng	Kim So-hyun & Son Jun-ho	Cloud Drifter (구름 나그네)	Lim Jeong-hee (432)
262	July 30, 2016	Songwriter Ahn Chi-haeng	Park Ki-young	Moon Halo (달무리)	Lim Jeong-hee (432)
262	July 30, 2016	Songwriter Ahn Chi-haeng	Lim Do-hyuk	Yeonan Pier (연안부두)	Lim Jeong-hee (432)
262	July 30, 2016	Songwriter Ahn Chi-haeng	Lim Jeong-hee	I Cry As I Regret (울면서 후회하네)	Lim Jeong-hee (432)
263	August 6, 2016	Roo'ra	Stephanie	100th Day (100일 째 만남)	Choi Jung-won (428)
263	August 6, 2016	Roo'ra	Park Jung-ah & Garlixx	Lover (연인)	Choi Jung-won (428)
263	August 6, 2016	Roo'ra	Son Seung-yeon & Baechigi	No Secrets (비밀은 없어)	Choi Jung-won (428)
263	August 6, 2016	Roo'ra	Kim Heechul & Kim Jungmo & Zhou Mi	Pro and Amateur (프로와 아마추어)	Choi Jung-won (428)
263	August 6, 2016	Roo'ra	Melody Day	Summer of Love	Choi Jung-won (428)
263	August 6, 2016	Roo'ra	ZE:A (Kevin & Dongjun) & 9MUSES (Kyungri & Hyemi)	Wingless Angel (날개 잃은 천사)	Choi Jung-won (428)
263	August 6, 2016	Roo'ra	Choi Jung-won	3! 4!	Choi Jung-won (428)
264	August 13, 2016	Summer Song Festival Special	Rose Motel	Kite (연)	BtoB (427)
264	August 13, 2016	Summer Song Festival Special	Hong Ji-min	Young Smile (젊은 미소)	BtoB (427)
264	August 13, 2016	Summer Song Festival Special	Choi Min-soo & MC Sniper	I Lived Yet Knew Nothing Of This World (세상 모르고 살았노라)	BtoB (427)
264	August 13, 2016	Summer Song Festival Special	BtoB	To My Lover (님에게)	BtoB (427)
264	August 13, 2016	Summer Song Festival Special	Homme	Just Like That (그대로 그렇게)	BtoB (427)
264	August 13, 2016	Summer Song Festival Special	Second Moon feat. Kim Junsu & Ko Yeong-yeol	Summer (여름)	BtoB (427)
264	August 13, 2016	Summer Song Festival Special	Lim Do-hyeok	The Clouds and Me (구름과 나)	BtoB (427)
265	August 20, 2016	Seven Diva Special	Lee Young-hyun	I Will Survive (난 괜찮아)	Son Seung-yeon (439)
265	August 20, 2016	Seven Diva Special	Kim Na-young	Once Upon A Day (하루)	Son Seung-yeon (439)
265	August 20, 2016	Seven Diva Special	Yangpa	Music Is My Life	Son Seung-yeon (439)
265	August 20, 2016	Seven Diva Special	Solji (EXID)	As We Live (살다가)	Son Seung-yeon (439)
265	August 20, 2016	Seven Diva Special	Son Seung-yeon	The Unwritten Legend (전설 속의 누군가처럼)	Son Seung-yeon (439)
265	August 20, 2016	Seven Diva Special	Lim Jeong-hee	Pierrot Smiles at Us (삐에로는 우릴 보고 웃지)	Son Seung-yeon (439)
265	August 20, 2016	Seven Diva Special	Hyolyn (Sistar)	If I'd Loved Only A Bit (조금만 사랑했다면)	Son Seung-yeon (439)
266	August 27, 2016	Chris Norman	Lee Se-joon (Yurisangja)	Mexican Girl	Kim Jo-han (424)
266	August 27, 2016	Chris Norman	Ailee	Stumblin' In	Kim Jo-han (424)
266	August 27, 2016	Chris Norman	Sam Kim	I'll Meet You At Midnight	Kim Jo-han (424)
266	August 27, 2016	Chris Norman	Boohwal & Kim Do-kyun	What Can I Do	Kim Jo-han (424)
266	August 27, 2016	Chris Norman	Kim Jo-han	Living Next Door to Alice	Kim Jo-han (424)
266	August 27, 2016	Chris Norman	Park Ki-young	If You Think You Know How to Love Me	Kim Jo-han (424)
267	September 3, 2016	Drama Soundtrack Special	Big Brain	You Are My Everything	Kim Dong-jun (429)
267	September 3, 2016	Drama Soundtrack Special	Im Tae-kyung	My Destiny	Kim Dong-jun (429)
267	September 3, 2016	Drama Soundtrack Special	Song So-hee	Onara (오나라) & I Can't Say Goodbye (불인별곡)	Kim Dong-jun (429)
267	September 3, 2016	Drama Soundtrack Special	Lyn	Here I Am	Kim Dong-jun (429)
267	September 3, 2016	Drama Soundtrack Special	Homme	Snow Flower (눈의 꽃)	Kim Dong-jun (429)
267	September 3, 2016	Drama Soundtrack Special	Rose Motel	Don't Forget (잊지 말아요)	Kim Dong-jun (429)
267	September 3, 2016	Drama Soundtrack Special	Kim Dong-jun (ZE:A)	Like the First Day (처음 그 날처럼)	Kim Dong-jun (429)
268	September 10, 2016	Songwriter Im Jong-su	Lee Ki-chan & Hur Gyu & Kim Shin-eui	Take It (가져가)	Kim Tae-woo (436)
268	September 10, 2016	Songwriter Im Jong-su	Kim So-hyun & Son Jun-ho	A Song For My Wife (아내에게 바치는 노래)	Kim Tae-woo (436)
268	September 10, 2016	Songwriter Im Jong-su	Kim Kyung-ho	Hometown Station (고향역)	Kim Tae-woo (436)
268	September 10, 2016	Songwriter Im Jong-su	Bae Da-hae	You'll Never Know (모르리)	Kim Tae-woo (436)
268	September 10, 2016	Songwriter Im Jong-su	Lazybone	Because I'm a Man (남자라는 이유로)	Kim Tae-woo (436)
268	September 10, 2016	Songwriter Im Jong-su	Kim Tae-woo	Okgyeong (옥경이)	Kim Tae-woo (436)
268	September 10, 2016	Songwriter Im Jong-su	Lim Do-hyeok	Floating Weeds (부초)	Kim Tae-woo (436)
269	September 17, 2016	Chuseok Special with Nam Jin	Son Jun-ho & Yun Seonok	Love Me Once Again (미워도 다시 한 번)	Nam Sang-il & Lee Myeongsun (419)
269	September 17, 2016	Chuseok Special with Nam Jin	Jung Sung-ho & Oh Yeongsuk	With My Love (님과 함께)	Nam Sang-il & Lee Myeongsun (419)
269	September 17, 2016	Chuseok Special with Nam Jin	Moon Hee-ok & Kim Hansun	Brokenhearted (가슴 아프게)	Nam Sang-il & Lee Myeongsun (419)
269	September 17, 2016	Chuseok Special with Nam Jin	Son Seung-yeon & Jeong Gichun	If I Had a Lover (나에게 애인이 있다면)	Nam Sang-il & Lee Myeongsun (419)
269	September 17, 2016	Chuseok Special with Nam Jin	Nam Sang-il & Lee Myeongsun	I Love You (당신이 좋아)	Nam Sang-il & Lee Myeongsun (419)
269	September 17, 2016	Chuseok Special with Nam Jin	Kim Bo-kyung & Han Minyeong	Darling, Please Don't Change (그대여 변치 마오)	Nam Sang-il & Lee Myeongsun (419)
270	September 24, 2016	Cherbourg Special	Clazziquai	The Truth About Love (사랑의 진실)	Kang Hong-seok (407)
270	September 24, 2016	Cherbourg Special	Ben	A Letter Written in Tears (눈물로 쓴 편지)	Kang Hong-seok (407)
270	September 24, 2016	Cherbourg Special	Lovelyz	Love, Love, Who Said It (사랑 사랑 누가 말했나) & Youth Who Lived off of Dreams (꿈을 먹는 젊은이)	Kang Hong-seok (407)
270	September 24, 2016	Cherbourg Special	Kim Hyun-sung	Little Lovers (작은 연인들)	Kang Hong-seok (407)
270	September 24, 2016	Cherbourg Special	Seomoon Tak	Long-Awaited Reunion (해후)	Kang Hong-seok (407)
270	September 24, 2016	Cherbourg Special	Kang Hong-seok	Heartless Blues (무정 부르스)	Kang Hong-seok (407)
271	October 1, 2016	Cherbourg Special	Im Tae-kyung	Nameless Girl (이름 모를 소녀)	Yurisangja (424)
271	October 1, 2016	Cherbourg Special	Nam Hyun-joon & Park Ae-ri	The Way to Sampo (삼포로 가는 길)	Yurisangja (424)
271	October 1, 2016	Cherbourg Special	Kim Juna	With your eyes (눈으로)	Yurisangja (424)
271	October 1, 2016	Cherbourg Special	Kim Ba-da	I Wonder Where You Are By Now (어디쯤 가고 있을까)	Yurisangja (424)
271	October 1, 2016	Cherbourg Special	Yurisangja	Autumn Love (가을 사랑)	Yurisangja (424)
271	October 1, 2016	Cherbourg Special	Kim Dong-jun (ZE:A)	You Outside My Door (문 밖에 있는 그대)	Yurisangja (424)
272	October 8, 2016	Songwriter Shin Jae-hong	December	In the Recesses of Memory (기억 속에 먼 그대에게)	Yangpa (435)
272	October 8, 2016	Songwriter Shin Jae-hong	Wheesung	Desire and Resentment (원하고 원망하죠)	Yangpa (435)
272	October 8, 2016	Songwriter Shin Jae-hong	BMK	When This Night Passes (이 밤이 지나면)	Yangpa (435)
272	October 8, 2016	Songwriter Shin Jae-hong	Davichi	Amidst this sadness I Must Forget You (슬픔 속에 그댈 지워야만 해)	Yangpa (435)
272	October 8, 2016	Songwriter Shin Jae-hong	Lee Se-joon (Yurisangja)	Sad Sea (슬픈 바다)	Yangpa (435)
272	October 8, 2016	Songwriter Shin Jae-hong	Lee Ye-joon	Goodbye Trip (이별 여행)	Yangpa (435)
272	October 8, 2016	Songwriter Shin Jae-hong	Yangpa	For You (너를 위해)	Yangpa (435)
273	October 15, 2016	Arirang Special	Kim So-hyun	Arirang Alone (홀로 아리랑)	Kim Kyung-ho (434)
273	October 15, 2016	Arirang Special	Son Seung-yeon	Milyang Arirang (밀양 아리랑)	Kim Kyung-ho (434)
273	October 15, 2016	Arirang Special	Boohwal	Bonjo Arirang (본조 아리랑)	Kim Kyung-ho (434)
273	October 15, 2016	Arirang Special	Kim Dong-jun (ZE:A)	Yeongam Arirang (영암 아리랑)	Kim Kyung-ho (434)
273	October 15, 2016	Arirang Special	Song So-hee	Gangwon-do Arirang (강원도 아리랑)	Kim Kyung-ho (434)
273	October 15, 2016	Arirang Special	Kim Kyung-ho	Arirang Mokdong (아리랑 목동)	Kim Kyung-ho (434)
273	October 15, 2016	Arirang Special	Second Moon feat. Kim Junsu & Ko Yeong-yeol	Jindo Arirang (진도 아리랑)	Kim Kyung-ho (434)
274	October 22, 2016	Kim Jang-hoon	DIA	Highway Romance (고속도로 로망스)	Yangpa (423); Kim Yeon-ji (423)
274	October 22, 2016	Kim Jang-hoon	Se7en	Even if You get Cheated by the World (세상이 그대를 속일지라도)	Yangpa (423); Kim Yeon-ji (423)
274	October 22, 2016	Kim Jang-hoon	Hong Kyung-min	I am a Man (난 남자다)	Yangpa (423); Kim Yeon-ji (423)
274	October 22, 2016	Kim Jang-hoon	Bae Da-hae	If You Feel As I Do (나와 같다면)	Yangpa (423); Kim Yeon-ji (423)
274	October 22, 2016	Kim Jang-hoon	Yangpa	While Living Life (사노라면)	Yangpa (423); Kim Yeon-ji (423)
274	October 22, 2016	Kim Jang-hoon	Kim Yeon-ji	Sad Gift(슬픈 선물)	Yangpa (423); Kim Yeon-ji (423)
275	October 29, 2016	Songwriter Lee Beom-hui	Lim Jeong-hee	Promises (약속)	Nam Gyeong-ju (419)
275	October 29, 2016	Songwriter Lee Beom-hui	Cosmic Girls	Monologue (독백)	Nam Gyeong-ju (419)
275	October 29, 2016	Songwriter Lee Beom-hui	December	A Girl's Story of Love (어느 소녀의 사랑 이야기)	Nam Gyeong-ju (419)
275	October 29, 2016	Songwriter Lee Beom-hui	Kim Hyun-sung feat. Giant Pink	Party of Tears (눈물의 파티)	Nam Gyeong-ju (419)
275	October 29, 2016	Songwriter Lee Beom-hui	Nam Gyeong-ju feat. Seo Beom Seok, Seong Du-seop & Heo Gyu	Forgotten season (잊혀진 계절)	Nam Gyeong-ju (419)
275	October 29, 2016	Songwriter Lee Beom-hui	Lazybone	Let's Study (공부합시다)	Nam Gyeong-ju (419)
275	October 29, 2016	Songwriter Lee Beom-hui	Son Ho-young	Paper Crane (종이학)	Nam Gyeong-ju (419)
276	November 5, 2016	We are one, Singing of reunification	BMK	They Said (라구요)	Youme (439)
276	November 5, 2016	We are one, Singing of reunification	Contempo Divo	Geumgangsan, How I Long For You (그리운 금강산)	Youme (439)
276	November 5, 2016	We are one, Singing of reunification	Nam Sang-il	Away, 38th Parallel (가거라 삼팔선)	Youme (439)
276	November 5, 2016	We are one, Singing of reunification	Kim Yeon-ji	Rusty Railroad (녹슬은 기찻길)	Youme (439)
276	November 5, 2016	We are one, Singing of reunification	GFRIEND	Our Land (터)	Youme (439)
276	November 5, 2016	We are one, Singing of reunification	Kim Jong-seo	Beautiful Rivers and Mountains (아름다운 강산)	Youme (439)
276	November 5, 2016	We are one, Singing of reunification	Youme	Letter for Daedonggang (대동강 편지)	Youme (439)
277	November 12, 2016	Kim Hyun-sik	Hang Dong-geun	Making Memories (추억 만들기)	Huh Gak (428)
277	November 12, 2016	Kim Hyun-sik	Lisa	I Loved You (사랑했어요)	Huh Gak (428)
277	November 12, 2016	Kim Hyun-sik	Jung Dong-ha	Alleyway (골목길)	Huh Gak (428)
277	November 12, 2016	Kim Hyun-sik	Se7en	Like Rain, Like Music (비처럼 음악처럼)	Huh Gak (428)
277	November 12, 2016	Kim Hyun-sik	Huh Gak	My Love by My Side (내 사랑 내 곁에)	Huh Gak (428)
277	November 12, 2016	Kim Hyun-sik	VROMANCE	Love, Love, Love (사랑 사랑 사랑)	Huh Gak (428)
277	November 12, 2016	Kim Hyun-sik	MAMAMOO	You are Always by My Side (언제나 그대 내 곁에)	Huh Gak (428)
278	November 19, 2016	Poets' Songs Special	Wax	Farewell (이별 노래)	KCM (439)
278	November 19, 2016	Poets' Songs Special	I.O.I	People are More Beautiful than Flowers (사람이 꽃보다 아름다워)	KCM (439)
278	November 19, 2016	Poets' Songs Special	Im Tae-kyung	Blowin' in the Wind	KCM (439)
278	November 19, 2016	Poets' Songs Special	Kim Hyun-sung	Blue Day (푸르른 날)	KCM (439)
278	November 19, 2016	Poets' Songs Special	Kim Ba-da	Knockin' on Heaven's Door	KCM (439)
278	November 19, 2016	Poets' Songs Special	Take	Homesick (향수)	KCM (439)
278	November 19, 2016	Poets' Songs Special	KCM	Azaleas (진달래꽃)	KCM (439)
279	November 26, 2016	Friend Special	Kim Jeong-hoon & Uji (Bestie)	With You Always (그대와 영원히)	Lee Tae-sung & Yoon Hyun-min (423)
279	November 26, 2016	Friend Special	Lee Young-ha & Ryu Jeong-pil	It Is You (그건 너)	Lee Tae-sung & Yoon Hyun-min (423)
279	November 26, 2016	Friend Special	Park Soo-hong & Park Kyung-lim	This Isn't Right (이게 아닌데) & Dear Friend (친구여)	Lee Tae-sung & Yoon Hyun-min (423)
279	November 26, 2016	Friend Special	Lee Yoo-ri & An Yoo-jin & Jung Sang-yoon	You Mean Everything to Me & Stupid Cupid	Lee Tae-sung & Yoon Hyun-min (423)
279	November 26, 2016	Friend Special	Lee Tae-sung & Yoon Hyun-min	I'm a Butterfly (나는 나비)	Lee Tae-sung & Yoon Hyun-min (423)
279	November 26, 2016	Friend Special	Bang Joong-hyu & Han Soo-yeon	Into Memories (기억 속으로)	Lee Tae-sung & Yoon Hyun-min (423)
280	December 3, 2016	Composer Choi Jun-young	B1A4	Before It Gets Any Sadder (슬퍼지려 하기 전에)	Tei (433)
280	December 3, 2016	Composer Choi Jun-young	Sweet Sorrow	Can't Get Over You (미련)	Tei (433)
280	December 3, 2016	Composer Choi Jun-young	Mio	My All (순정)	Tei (433)
280	December 3, 2016	Composer Choi Jun-young	BMK	Fix My Makeup (화장을 고치고)	Tei (433)
280	December 3, 2016	Composer Choi Jun-young	Kim Feel	Seoul Moon (서울의 달)	Tei (433)
280	December 3, 2016	Composer Choi Jun-young	Stephanie	Come Back (와)	Tei (433)
280	December 3, 2016	Composer Choi Jun-young	Tei	The Flight (비상)	Tei (433)
281	December 10, 2016	Kim Seong-ho	Lim Jeong-hee	Recollection (회상)	Homme (441)
281	December 10, 2016	Kim Seong-ho	Kim Yeon-ji	Have You Ever had Coffee with an Angel? (당신은 천사와 커피를 마셔 본 적이 있습니까?)	Homme (441)
281	December 10, 2016	Kim Seong-ho	Kim Hyun-sung	Just One More Time (한 번만 더)	Homme (441)
281	December 10, 2016	Kim Seong-ho	OH MY GIRL	Balloons (풍선)	Homme (441)
281	December 10, 2016	Kim Seong-ho	Contempo Divo	When I First Met You (너를 처음 만난 그 때)	Homme (441)
281	December 10, 2016	Kim Seong-ho	SS301	I'm Fine (나는 문제없어)	Homme (441)
281	December 10, 2016	Kim Seong-ho	Homme	I'm Loneliness, You're Longing (나는 외로움, 그대는 그리움)	Homme (441)
282	December 17, 2016	Songwriter Jeon Young-rok	Take	Destiny (인연)	Ailee (416)
282	December 17, 2016	Songwriter Jeon Young-rok	Astro	Don't Look Back (돌이키지마)	Ailee (416)
282	December 17, 2016	Songwriter Jeon Young-rok	Kim Ba-da	Promise Like a Passing Breeze (약속은 바람처럼)	Ailee (416)
282	December 17, 2016	Songwriter Jeon Young-rok	Ailee	Don't Forget Me (나를 잊지 말아요)	Ailee (416)
282	December 17, 2016	Songwriter Jeon Young-rok	Kim Se-jeong (Gugudan)	Love is Like Rain Outside My Window (사랑은 창 밖의 빗물 같아요)	Ailee (416)
282	December 17, 2016	Songwriter Jeon Young-rok	Kim Ji-woo	Wind, Please Stop Blowing (바람아 멈추어다)	Ailee (416)
282	December 17, 2016	Songwriter Jeon Young-rok	Hong Kyung-min & Son Jun-ho & Ji Joo-yeon	I Hate You (얄미운 사람)	Ailee (416)
283	December 24, 2016	Best of the Best Competition	Ali	With Our Love (사랑으로)	Huh Gak (433)
283	December 24, 2016	Best of the Best Competition	Kim Kyung-ho	Tomorrow (내일)	Huh Gak (433)
283	December 24, 2016	Best of the Best Competition	Lee Young-hyun	Into The New World (다시 만난 세계)	Huh Gak (433)
283	December 24, 2016	Best of the Best Competition	KCM	Confession (고해)	Huh Gak (433)
283	December 24, 2016	Best of the Best Competition	Kim So-hyun & Son Jun-ho	Time to Say Goodbye	Huh Gak (433)
283	December 24, 2016	Best of the Best Competition	Huh Gak	Running Across the Sky (하늘을 달리다)	Huh Gak (433)
284	December 31, 2016	Best of the Best Competition	Tei	Back in Those Days (그 날들)	Tei (437)
284	December 31, 2016	Best of the Best Competition	MAMAMOO	You, In My Fading Memory (흐린 기억 속의 그대)	Tei (437)
284	December 31, 2016	Best of the Best Competition	Lyn	Memories are Sadder than Love (기억이란 사랑보다)	Tei (437)
284	December 31, 2016	Best of the Best Competition	Yurisangja	The Teahouse in Winter (그 겨울의 찻집)	Tei (437)
284	December 31, 2016	Best of the Best Competition	Jung Dong-ha	I Hope It Would be that Way Now (이젠 그랬으면 좋겠네)	Tei (437)
284	December 31, 2016	Best of the Best Competition	Kim Tae-woo	We are (우리는)	Tei (437)

=== 2017 ===
List of episodes aired in 2017

Singers listed in order of performance.

Episode #	Broadcast Date	Legend or Theme	Guest Singers	Songs	Final Winner (Votes)
285	January 7, 2017	New Year Special	Hwang Chi-yeul	Joy (환희)	Park Ki-young & Kim Hyuk-gun (435)
285	January 7, 2017	New Year Special	Nam Kyung-eup & Nam Kyung-ju	Bridge over Troubled Water	Park Ki-young & Kim Hyuk-gun (435)
285	January 7, 2017	New Year Special	Park Ae-ri & Nam Sang-il	Sunny day (해 뜰 날)	Park Ki-young & Kim Hyuk-gun (435)
285	January 7, 2017	New Year Special	Ladies' Code	Butterfly	Park Ki-young & Kim Hyuk-gun (435)
285	January 7, 2017	New Year Special	Hong Kyung-min & Um Hong-gil	Evergreen Tree (상록수)	Park Ki-young & Kim Hyuk-gun (435)
285	January 7, 2017	New Year Special	Park Ki-young & Kim Hyuk-gun (The Cross)	The Prayer	Park Ki-young & Kim Hyuk-gun (435)
286	January 14, 2017	Hye Eun-yi	Jung Dong-ha	Soliloquy (독백)	Park Wan-kyu (439)
286	January 14, 2017	Hye Eun-yi	Hwayobi	You Wouldn't Know (당신은 모르실 거야)	Park Wan-kyu (439)
286	January 14, 2017	Hye Eun-yi	Son Seung-yeon	I'm Every Woman & The Third Hangang Bridge (제3 한강교)	Park Wan-kyu (439)
286	January 14, 2017	Hye Eun-yi	Lazybone	Rain at Dawn (새벽비)	Park Wan-kyu (439)
286	January 14, 2017	Hye Eun-yi	KCM	Passion (열정)	Park Wan-kyu (439)
286	January 14, 2017	Hye Eun-yi	Parc Jae-jung	Regret (후회)	Park Wan-kyu (439)
286	January 14, 2017	Hye Eun-yi	Park Wan-kyu	Elegy (비가)	Park Wan-kyu (439)
287	January 21, 2017	Songwriter Jo Wun-pa	Hyun Jin-young	Empty Glass (빈 잔)	Seo Ji-an (417)
287	January 21, 2017	Songwriter Jo Wun-pa	Seo Ji-an	Wings (날개)	Seo Ji-an (417)
287	January 21, 2017	Songwriter Jo Wun-pa	Eunkwang (BtoB)	Letter That was Sent Blank (백지로 보낸 편지)	Seo Ji-an (417)
287	January 21, 2017	Songwriter Jo Wun-pa	Oh Jung-hae	Chilgapsan (칠갑산)	Seo Ji-an (417)
287	January 21, 2017	Songwriter Jo Wun-pa	Park Ki-young	Yeonan Pier (연안 부두)	Seo Ji-an (417)
287	January 21, 2017	Songwriter Jo Wun-pa	Uji (Bestie) feat. MC Gree	Strangers Again (도로 남)	Seo Ji-an (417)
287	January 21, 2017	Songwriter Jo Wun-pa	Kim Hyun-sung	Okgyeong (옥경이)	Seo Ji-an (417)
288	January 28, 2017	Seollal Season Special	Yang Hee-kyung & Han Seung-hyun	You Can Do It (넌 할 수 있어)	Jang Yun-jeong & Do Kyung-wan (422)
288	January 28, 2017	Seollal Season Special	Kim Ji-sun and Family	Balloon (풍선)	Jang Yun-jeong & Do Kyung-wan (422)
288	January 28, 2017	Seollal Season Special	Luna (f(x)) & Park Jin-young	Father (아버지)	Jang Yun-jeong & Do Kyung-wan (422)
288	January 28, 2017	Seollal Season Special	Hong Seo-beom & Jo Gap-kyung & Hong Seok-ju	Where is the End of this Breakup? (이별의 끝은 어디인가요)	Jang Yun-jeong & Do Kyung-wan (422)
288	January 28, 2017	Seollal Season Special	Jang Yun-jeong & Do Kyung-wan	Match Made in Heaven (천생연분)	Jang Yun-jeong & Do Kyung-wan (422)
288	January 28, 2017	Seollal Season Special	Parc Jae-jung & Park Yi-jeong	Magic Castle (마법의 성)	Jang Yun-jeong & Do Kyung-wan (422)
289	February 4, 2017	Uhm Jung-hwa	AOA (Except: Yuna)	Festival	KCM (409)
289	February 4, 2017	Uhm Jung-hwa	Gain (Brown Eyed Girls) feat. Kim Jong-min	Invitation (초대)	KCM (409)
289	February 4, 2017	Uhm Jung-hwa	Jung Seung-hwan	After Love (후애)	KCM (409)
289	February 4, 2017	Uhm Jung-hwa	Kang Hong-suk feat. Kim Kiri	D.I.S.C.O	KCM (409)
289	February 4, 2017	Uhm Jung-hwa	Ulala Session	Hidden Pictures (숨은 그림 찾기)	KCM (409)
289	February 4, 2017	Uhm Jung-hwa	KCM	I Don't Know (몰라)	KCM (409)
290	February 11, 2017	Uhm Jung-hwa	Rose Motel	Rose of Betrayal (배반의 장미)	Huh Gak (423)
290	February 11, 2017	Uhm Jung-hwa	Huh Gak	A Love Only Heaven Permits (하늘만 허락한 사랑)	Huh Gak (423)
290	February 11, 2017	Uhm Jung-hwa	IVY & Min Woo-hyuk	Your Eyes (눈동자)	Huh Gak (423)
290	February 11, 2017	Uhm Jung-hwa	Seventeen	Tell Me (말해줘)	Huh Gak (423)
290	February 11, 2017	Uhm Jung-hwa	Homme	Poison	Huh Gak (423)
290	February 11, 2017	Uhm Jung-hwa	Matilda	Go Away (다 가라)	Huh Gak (423)
291	February 18, 2017	Park Jung-woon & Kim Min-woo	Park Wan-kyu	One Day in the Far Future (먼 훗날에)	Ben & Im Se-jun (432)
291	February 18, 2017	Park Jung-woon & Kim Min-woo	Niel (Teen Top) feat. Ricky (Teen Top) & 100% (Rokhyun & Hyukjin)	My Friend, My Place of Reprieve (휴식 같은 친구)	Ben & Im Se-jun (432)
291	February 18, 2017	Park Jung-woon & Kim Min-woo	Lee Ji-hoon	Inside the Conscription Train (입영 열차 안에서)	Ben & Im Se-jun (432)
291	February 18, 2017	Park Jung-woon & Kim Min-woo	Tei	It's Just How I Love You (사랑일 뿐야)	Ben & Im Se-jun (432)
291	February 18, 2017	Park Jung-woon & Kim Min-woo	Hello Venus	When Tomorrow Comes (내일이 찾아 오면)	Ben & Im Se-jun (432)
291	February 18, 2017	Park Jung-woon & Kim Min-woo	Parc Jae-jung	My Love Existed Only to be with You (그대만을 위한 사랑)	Ben & Im Se-jun (432)
291	February 18, 2017	Park Jung-woon & Kim Min-woo	Ben & Im Se-jun	On a Night Like Tonight (오늘 같은 밤이면)	Ben & Im Se-jun (432)
292	February 25, 2017	Songwriter Choi Jong-hyeok	Park Wan-kyu	Heart Will Have Lost Its Way (내 마음 갈 곳을 잃어)	Song So-hee & Ko Yeong-yeol (439)
292	February 25, 2017	Songwriter Choi Jong-hyeok	Voisper	You're Crying Too (당신도 울고 있네요)	Song So-hee & Ko Yeong-yeol (439)
292	February 25, 2017	Songwriter Choi Jong-hyeok	Seo Ji-an	To the DJ (DJ에게)	Song So-hee & Ko Yeong-yeol (439)
292	February 25, 2017	Songwriter Choi Jong-hyeok	Kim Kyung-ho	Run (뛰어)	Song So-hee & Ko Yeong-yeol (439)
292	February 25, 2017	Songwriter Choi Jong-hyeok	Kim Myung-hoon (Ulala Session)	Goodbye Song (이별 노래)	Song So-hee & Ko Yeong-yeol (439)
292	February 25, 2017	Songwriter Choi Jong-hyeok	Park Ki-young	Song For You (열애)	Song So-hee & Ko Yeong-yeol (439)
292	February 25, 2017	Songwriter Choi Jong-hyeok	Song So-hee & Ko Yeong-yeol	This is Goodbye (이별이래)	Song So-hee & Ko Yeong-yeol (439)
293	March 4, 2017	Kang In-won	Oh My Girl (Except: JinE)	You're Smiling as Pretty as a Doll (그대는 인형처럼 웃고 있지만)	Kim So-hyun & Son Jun-ho (434)
293	March 4, 2017	Kang In-won	Moon Hee-kyung	You're Like a Rose (그대 모습은 장미)	Kim So-hyun & Son Jun-ho (434)
293	March 4, 2017	Kang In-won	Lim Jeong-hee	I Love You, I Love You (사랑해 사랑해)	Kim So-hyun & Son Jun-ho (434)
293	March 4, 2017	Kang In-won	Kim Kyung-ho & Hong Kyung-min & Lee Se-joon (Yurisangja)	Watercolor Painting on a Rainy Day (비 오는 날의 수채화)	Kim So-hyun & Son Jun-ho (434)
293	March 4, 2017	Kang In-won	Bae Da-hae	I Will Love You First (제가 먼저 사랑할래요)	Kim So-hyun & Son Jun-ho (434)
293	March 4, 2017	Kang In-won	Min Woo-hyuk	Our Love is Half the Other's World (사랑은 세상의 반)	Kim So-hyun & Son Jun-ho (434)
293	March 4, 2017	Kang In-won	Kim So-hyun & Son Jun-ho	Long Ago (오래 전에)	Kim So-hyun & Son Jun-ho (434)
294	March 11, 2017	Kim Myung-gon	Kim Jung-min	Round and Round (빙글빙글)	Park Ki-young (440)
294	March 11, 2017	Kim Myung-gon	Ulala Session	Tell Her for Me (그녀에게 전해주오)	Park Ki-young (440)
294	March 11, 2017	Kim Myung-gon	Sugar Donut & Yuk Joong-wan (Rose Motel)	Open the Door (문을 열어)	Park Ki-young (440)
294	March 11, 2017	Kim Myung-gon	Eve	City Streets (도시의 거리)	Park Ki-young (440)
294	March 11, 2017	Kim Myung-gon	Michael K. Lee & Kim Sa-eun	I See (보이네)	Park Ki-young (440)
294	March 11, 2017	Kim Myung-gon	Park Ki-young	Goodbye Written on the Window (유리창에 그린 안녕)	Park Ki-young (440)
294	March 11, 2017	Kim Myung-gon	Kim Wan-sun & KNK	Great Joy (환희)	Park Ki-young (440)
295	March 18, 2017	Yoon Jong-shin	Jung Seung-hwan	Your Wedding (너의 결혼식)	Roy Kim (432)
295	March 18, 2017	Yoon Jong-shin	Shin Yong-jae (4Men)	On the Street (거리에서)	Roy Kim (432)
295	March 18, 2017	Yoon Jong-shin	Jannabi	My Day (나의 하루)	Roy Kim (432)
295	March 18, 2017	Yoon Jong-shin	Ali	Instinct (본능적으로)	Roy Kim (432)
295	March 18, 2017	Yoon Jong-shin	Lee Seok-hun (SG Wannabe)	Annie	Roy Kim (432)
295	March 18, 2017	Yoon Jong-shin	Roy Kim	That Day Long Ago (오래전 그 날)	Roy Kim (432)
295	March 18, 2017	Yoon Jong-shin	Kwak Jin-eon	Reincarnation (환생)	Roy Kim (432)
296	March 25, 2017	Park Jae-ran	Kim Myung-hoon (Ulala Session)	In the Southern Village over that Hill (산 너머 남촌에는)	Min Woo-hyuk (433)
296	March 25, 2017	Park Jae-ran	Brave Girls (Except: Hyeran)	Ranch Girl in the Straw Hat (밀짚모자 목장 아가씨)	Min Woo-hyuk (433)
296	March 25, 2017	Park Jae-ran	Choi Jung-won	The Pearl Fishers (진주조개 잡이)	Min Woo-hyuk (433)
296	March 25, 2017	Park Jae-ran	Lee Se-joon (Yurisangja)	My Love (님)	Min Woo-hyuk (433)
296	March 25, 2017	Park Jae-ran	Park Hye-kyoung	Lucky Morning (럭키 모닝)	Min Woo-hyuk (433)
296	March 25, 2017	Park Jae-ran	Min Woo-hyuk feat. Bubble Sisters	Blue Wings (푸른 날개)	Min Woo-hyuk (433)
296	March 25, 2017	Park Jae-ran	Nam Hyun-joon & Park Ae-ri	Narrow-Mouth Toad Taryeong (맹꽁이 타령)	Min Woo-hyuk (433)
297	April 1, 2017	Kim Kwang-jin	Moon Myung-jin	Magic Castle (마법의 성)	Ailee (427)
297	April 1, 2017	Kim Kwang-jin	Ben & Im Se-jun	Pledge of Love (사랑의 서약)	Ailee (427)
297	April 1, 2017	Kim Kwang-jin	GFriend	Fox (여우야)	Ailee (427)
297	April 1, 2017	Kim Kwang-jin	Min Woo-hyuk	Remember (기억해 줘)	Ailee (427)
297	April 1, 2017	Kim Kwang-jin	Ki Hyun	Just that You're in this World (그대가 이 세상에 있는 것만으로)	Ailee (427)
297	April 1, 2017	Kim Kwang-jin	Na Yoon-kwon	As I did that First Day (처음 느낌 그대로)	Ailee (427)
297	April 1, 2017	Kim Kwang-jin	Ailee	Letter (편지)	Ailee (427)
298	April 8, 2017	300th Episode Special Part 1: KBS entertainment gods	Kim Jong-min & Jung Joon-young (Drug Restaurant) (Team 2 Days & 1 Night)	Saturday Nights are Amazing (토요일은 밤이 좋아)	Lee Young-ja & Cultwo feat. Shin Dong-yup (429)
298	April 8, 2017	300th Episode Special Part 1: KBS entertainment gods	Hyun Woo & Muzie (Team Singing Battle – Victory)	Like Rain, Like Music (비처럼 음악처럼)	Lee Young-ja & Cultwo feat. Shin Dong-yup (429)
298	April 8, 2017	300th Episode Special Part 1: KBS entertainment gods	Jang Yun-jeong & Do Kyung-wan feat. Park Mo-se (Team I Like to Sing)	Though the World May Deceive You (세상이 그대를 속일지라도)	Lee Young-ja & Cultwo feat. Shin Dong-yup (429)
298	April 8, 2017	300th Episode Special Part 1: KBS entertainment gods	Hong Jin-kyung & Jeon So-mi feat. Minzy, Hong Jin-young & Kim Sook (Team Sister's Slam Dunk season 2)	Pick Me & Shut Up	Lee Young-ja & Cultwo feat. Shin Dong-yup (429)
298	April 8, 2017	300th Episode Special Part 1: KBS entertainment gods	Yoo Min-sang & Lee Soo-ji (Team Gag Concert)	True Love (순정)	Lee Young-ja & Cultwo feat. Shin Dong-yup (429)
298	April 8, 2017	300th Episode Special Part 1: KBS entertainment gods	Lee Young-ja & Cultwo feat. Shin Dong-yup (Team Hello Counselor)	Festival & Balloon (풍선) & While Living Life (사노라면)	Lee Young-ja & Cultwo feat. Shin Dong-yup (429)
298	April 8, 2017	300th Episode Special Part 1: KBS entertainment gods	Kim Saeng-min & Jeong Ji-won & Kim Sun-geun (Team Entertainment Weekly)	Show	Lee Young-ja & Cultwo feat. Shin Dong-yup (429)
299	April 15, 2017	300th Episode Special Part 2: Eight stars that made "Immortal Songs" shine	Nam Sang-il	Love is Afar (님은 먼 곳에)	Yoon Min-soo & Shin Yong-jae & Ben & Im Se-jun (436)
299	April 15, 2017	300th Episode Special Part 2: Eight stars that made "Immortal Songs" shine	Hwang Chi-yeul	With You (님과 함께)	Yoon Min-soo & Shin Yong-jae & Ben & Im Se-jun (436)
299	April 15, 2017	300th Episode Special Part 2: Eight stars that made "Immortal Songs" shine	Ali	Knockin' on Heaven's Door	Yoon Min-soo & Shin Yong-jae & Ben & Im Se-jun (436)
299	April 15, 2017	300th Episode Special Part 2: Eight stars that made "Immortal Songs" shine	Moon Myung-jin	Love is Like Glass (사랑은 유리 같은 것)	Yoon Min-soo & Shin Yong-jae & Ben & Im Se-jun (436)
299	April 15, 2017	300th Episode Special Part 2: Eight stars that made "Immortal Songs" shine	Tei	Old Love (옛사랑)	Yoon Min-soo & Shin Yong-jae & Ben & Im Se-jun (436)
299	April 15, 2017	300th Episode Special Part 2: Eight stars that made "Immortal Songs" shine	Yoon Min-soo & Shin Yong-jae (4Men) & Ben & Im Se-jun	Beauty and the Beast	Yoon Min-soo & Shin Yong-jae & Ben & Im Se-jun (436)
299	April 15, 2017	300th Episode Special Part 2: Eight stars that made "Immortal Songs" shine	Kim So-hyun & Son Jun-ho	Libiamo ne' lieti calici (축배의 노래)	Yoon Min-soo & Shin Yong-jae & Ben & Im Se-jun (436)
299	April 15, 2017	300th Episode Special Part 2: Eight stars that made "Immortal Songs" shine	Hong Kyung-min feat. Kim Yu-na	Destiny (인연)	Yoon Min-soo & Shin Yong-jae & Ben & Im Se-jun (436)
300	April 22, 2017	300th Episode Special Part 3: Duets with the legends	Yang Soo-kyung & Woohyun (Infinite)	Forever (영영)	Insooni & Jung Dong-ha (441)
300	April 22, 2017	300th Episode Special Part 3: Duets with the legends	Joo Hyun-mi & Sweet Sorrow	The Man from Sinsa (신사동 그 사람) & Rain Upon Yeongdong Bridge (비 내라는 영동교)	Insooni & Jung Dong-ha (441)
300	April 22, 2017	300th Episode Special Part 3: Duets with the legends	Kim Young-im & No Brain	About 500 Years (한 오백 년) & Arirang (아리랑)	Insooni & Jung Dong-ha (441)
300	April 22, 2017	300th Episode Special Part 3: Duets with the legends	Jeon In-kwon & Park Ki-young	Beautiful Rivers & Mountains (아름다운 강산)	Insooni & Jung Dong-ha (441)
300	April 22, 2017	300th Episode Special Part 3: Duets with the legends	Nam Kyeong-eup & Min Woo-hyuk	A Flower Yet to Bloom (못다 핀 꽃 한 송이)	Insooni & Jung Dong-ha (441)
300	April 22, 2017	300th Episode Special Part 3: Duets with the legends	Insooni & Jung Dong-ha	Father (아버지)	Insooni & Jung Dong-ha (441)
301	April 29, 2017	Lee Hyun & Lee Su-mi	Min Woo-hyuk	Where are You Now, My Love? (내 사랑 지금 어디)	Son Jun-ho (431)
301	April 29, 2017	Lee Hyun & Lee Su-mi	JeA (Brown Eyed Girls) & Parc Jae-jung	My All-Girls' High School Days (여고시절)	Son Jun-ho (431)
301	April 29, 2017	Lee Hyun & Lee Su-mi	Son Jun-ho	Dancing with My First Love (춤추는 첫사랑)	Son Jun-ho (431)
301	April 29, 2017	Lee Hyun & Lee Su-mi	Boohwal	Will from Love (사랑의 의지)	Son Jun-ho (431)
301	April 29, 2017	Lee Hyun & Lee Su-mi	Park Hye-kyoung feat. Skull	Goodbye (잘 있어요)	Son Jun-ho (431)
301	April 29, 2017	Lee Hyun & Lee Su-mi	Vromance	Never Forget (잊지마)	Son Jun-ho (431)
301	April 29, 2017	Lee Hyun & Lee Su-mi	Lim Jeong-hee	Stay by My Side (내 곁에 있어주)	Son Jun-ho (431)
302	May 6, 2017	Kim Hee-Gap & Yang In-ja	NAVI	Put on My Lipstick (립스틱 짙게 바르고)	Jung Dong-ha (422)
302	May 6, 2017	Kim Hee-Gap & Yang In-ja	DIA	Men are a Bother to Women (남자는 여자를 귀찮게 해)	Jung Dong-ha (422)
302	May 6, 2017	Kim Hee-Gap & Yang In-ja	Kim Ji-woo & Cha Jeong-wu feat. Lim Hee-sook	I Dreamed a Dream & I Really Didn't Know (진정 난 몰랐네)	Jung Dong-ha (422)
302	May 6, 2017	Kim Hee-Gap & Yang In-ja	Kim Jung-min	White Magnolias (하얀 목련)	Jung Dong-ha (422)
302	May 6, 2017	Kim Hee-Gap & Yang In-ja	Soulights	Little Lovers (작은 연인들)	Jung Dong-ha (422)
302	May 6, 2017	Kim Hee-Gap & Yang In-ja	Jung Dong-ha	We Broke Up Too Easily (우린 너무 쉽게 헤어졌어요)	Jung Dong-ha (422)
303	May 13, 2017	Kim Hee-Gap & Yang In-ja	Huh Gak	The Teahouse That Winter (그 겨울의 찻집)	Min Woo-hyuk (429)
303	May 13, 2017	Kim Hee-Gap & Yang In-ja	Second Moon & Lee Bong-geun	That's It (타타타)	Min Woo-hyuk (429)
303	May 13, 2017	Kim Hee-Gap & Yang In-ja	Min Woo-hyuk	The Leopard of Kilimanjaro (킬리만자로의 표범)	Min Woo-hyuk (429)
303	May 13, 2017	Kim Hee-Gap & Yang In-ja	Bubble Sisters	I Want to Know (알고 싶어요)	Min Woo-hyuk (429)
303	May 13, 2017	Kim Hee-Gap & Yang In-ja	Cheetah	Q	Min Woo-hyuk (429)
303	May 13, 2017	Kim Hee-Gap & Yang In-ja	Seomoon Tak feat. Song Yong-jin	Passion (열정)	Min Woo-hyuk (429)
304	May 20, 2017	Singing of the brilliant spring with friends	Kim Hyung-joong & Seo Young-eun	My Longing for You Goes On (그리움만 쌓이네)	Yangpa & Oh Yeon-joon (432)
304	May 20, 2017	Singing of the brilliant spring with friends	Park Sang-min & Kim Jung-min	A Story of You and the Rain (비와 당신의 이야기)	Yangpa & Oh Yeon-joon (432)
304	May 20, 2017	Singing of the brilliant spring with friends	Lee Hyun (Homme) & Lee Jong-wook	Don't Leave Me (떠나지 마)	Yangpa & Oh Yeon-joon (432)
304	May 20, 2017	Singing of the brilliant spring with friends	KCM & Lim Jeong-hee	Love of a Thousand Years (천년의 사랑)	Yangpa & Oh Yeon-joon (432)
304	May 20, 2017	Singing of the brilliant spring with friends	Na Yoon-kwon & Min Woo-hyuk	For a Thousand Days (천일동안)	Yangpa & Oh Yeon-joon (432)
304	May 20, 2017	Singing of the brilliant spring with friends	Yangpa & Oh Yeon-joon	Sea Child (바다 아이) & Blue Night of Jeju-do (제주도의 푸른 밤)	Yangpa & Oh Yeon-joon (432)
305	May 27, 2017	Lyricist Ji Myeong-gil	Min Woo-hyuk	Maze of Love (사랑의 미로)	Lee Bong-geun (433)
305	May 27, 2017	Lyricist Ji Myeong-gil	Lovelyz	I Don't Know About Love Yet (난 사랑을 아직 몰라)	Lee Bong-geun (433)
305	May 27, 2017	Lyricist Ji Myeong-gil	Kim Tae-woo	Dance (춤을 추어요)	Lee Bong-geun (433)
305	May 27, 2017	Lyricist Ji Myeong-gil	No Brain	Celebration Song (축제의 노래)	Lee Bong-geun (433)
305	May 27, 2017	Lyricist Ji Myeong-gil	U Sung-eun & Kisum	Waves (파도)	Lee Bong-geun (433)
305	May 27, 2017	Lyricist Ji Myeong-gil	Lee Bong-geun	Yoke of Love (사랑의 굴레)	Lee Bong-geun (433)
305	May 27, 2017	Lyricist Ji Myeong-gil	Bubble Sisters	Love, Happiness and Parting (사랑과 행복 그리고 이별)	Lee Bong-geun (433)
306	June 3, 2017	Lee Nan-young	Lee Se-joon (Yurisangja)	Tears of Mokpo (목포의 눈물)	Kim So-hyun (424)
306	June 3, 2017	Lee Nan-young	Park Ki-young	Blue Dream of the Tea House (다방의 푸른 꿈)	Kim So-hyun (424)
306	June 3, 2017	Lee Nan-young	Kim Nani & Jeong Seok-soon	Song of the Seabird (해조곡)	Kim So-hyun (424)
306	June 3, 2017	Lee Nan-young	Lee Sun Jung Band	Cry, Weatherstripping (울어라 문풍지)	Kim So-hyun (424)
306	June 3, 2017	Lee Nan-young	NAVI	Dream of the Sea (바다의 꿈)	Kim So-hyun (424)
306	June 3, 2017	Lee Nan-young	Kim Kyung-ho	Mokpo is a Harbor (목포는 항구다)	Kim So-hyun (424)
306	June 3, 2017	Lee Nan-young	Kim So-hyun	Where Did My Father Go? (아버지는 어데로)	Kim So-hyun (424)
307	June 10, 2017	Park Mi-kyung	Nine Muses A	Obsession (집착)	Sandeul (421)
307	June 10, 2017	Park Mi-kyung	Min Woo-hyuk feat. Tania	To You Deep in My Memory (기억 속의 먼 그대에게)	Sandeul (421)
307	June 10, 2017	Park Mi-kyung	Sandeul (B1A4)	Like a Dandelion Spore (민들레 홀씨 되어)	Sandeul (421)
307	June 10, 2017	Park Mi-kyung	Sol Bi feat. Real Smell	Don't Be Like That (넌 그렇게 살지 마)	Sandeul (421)
307	June 10, 2017	Park Mi-kyung	Park Ki-young	When it Rains on a Tuesday (화요일에 비가 내리면)	Sandeul (421)
307	June 10, 2017	Park Mi-kyung	Jannabi	Unreasonable Reason (이유 같지 않은 이유)	Sandeul (421)
307	June 10, 2017	Park Mi-kyung	Ali	Eve's Warning (이브의 경고)	Sandeul (421)
308	June 17, 2017	Noh Sa-yeon	Jannabi	Your Shadow (님 그림자)	Lee Bong-geun (438)
308	June 17, 2017	Noh Sa-yeon	Kim Jung-min	Encounter (만남)	Lee Bong-geun (438)
308	June 17, 2017	Noh Sa-yeon	Lim Jeong-hee	For Us (우리에겐)	Lee Bong-geun (438)
308	June 17, 2017	Noh Sa-yeon	Shin Yu	Wish (바램)	Lee Bong-geun (438)
308	June 17, 2017	Noh Sa-yeon	U Sung-eun & Bong9 (GB9)	This Heart Back Here (이 마음 다시 여기에)	Lee Bong-geun (438)
308	June 17, 2017	Noh Sa-yeon	Mamamoo	Love (사랑)	Lee Bong-geun (438)
308	June 17, 2017	Noh Sa-yeon	Lee Bong-geun	Roundabout Way (돌고 돌아가는 길)	Lee Bong-geun (438)
309	June 24, 2017	Big Match of 7 Winners from the First Half of 2017	Yangpa	Morning Dew (아침 이슬)	Jung Dong-ha (443)
309	June 24, 2017	Big Match of 7 Winners from the First Half of 2017	Ben & Im Se-jun	Sad Destiny (슬픈 인연)	Jung Dong-ha (443)
309	June 24, 2017	Big Match of 7 Winners from the First Half of 2017	Roy Kim	Girl (소녀)	Jung Dong-ha (443)
309	June 24, 2017	Big Match of 7 Winners from the First Half of 2017	Kim So-hyun & Son Jun-ho	Bridge over Troubled Water & Hand in Hand (손에 손잡고)	Jung Dong-ha (443)
309	June 24, 2017	Big Match of 7 Winners from the First Half of 2017	Min Woo-hyuk	When Lilacs Wilt (라일락이 질 때)	Jung Dong-ha (443)
309	June 24, 2017	Big Match of 7 Winners from the First Half of 2017	Jung Dong-ha feat. Voisper	Baby on an Island (섬집 아기)	Jung Dong-ha (443)
309	June 24, 2017	Big Match of 7 Winners from the First Half of 2017	Lee Bong-geun	Spring Passes By (봄날은 간다)	Jung Dong-ha (443)
310	July 1, 2017	Clon	TheEastLight.	Funky Tonight	KCM (435)
310	July 1, 2017	Clon	Kim Chung-ha	Choryeon (초련)	KCM (435)
310	July 1, 2017	Clon	Hong Kyung-min	Bing Bing Bing (빙빙빙) & Nan (난)	KCM (435)
310	July 1, 2017	Clon	Seventeen (Except: Mingyu)	Escaping the city (도시탈출)	KCM (435)
310	July 1, 2017	Clon	KCM	Kungtari Shabara (쿵따리 샤바라)	KCM (435)
310	July 1, 2017	Clon	Nam Hyun-joon & Park Ae-ri	Love and Soul (사랑과 영혼)	KCM (435)
310	July 1, 2017	Clon	U Sung-eun & Kisum	Come Back (돌아와)	KCM (435)
311	July 8, 2017	The Blue	Astro	With You (그대와 함께)	Homme (432)
311	July 8, 2017	The Blue	Park Bo-ram	My Secret (혼자만의 비밀)	Homme (432)
311	July 8, 2017	The Blue	Kim Yong-jun (SG Wannabe)	That I Love You (사랑하고 있다는 걸)	Homme (432)
311	July 8, 2017	The Blue	Huh Gak	Endless Love	Homme (432)
311	July 8, 2017	The Blue	Ali	Kind Love (착한 사랑)	Homme (432)
311	July 8, 2017	The Blue	Homme	Feeling Only You (너만을 느끼며)	Homme (432)
311	July 8, 2017	The Blue	BtoB Blue	Under the Sky (하늘 아래서)	Homme (432)
312	July 15, 2017	Composer Park Shi-chun	Sonya	Serenade of the Front Line (전선야곡)	U Sung-eun & Bong9 (437)
312	July 15, 2017	Composer Park Shi-chun	Go Jae-geun feat. Kim Seol	Be Strong, Geum Soon (굳세어라 금순아)	U Sung-eun & Bong9 (437)
312	July 15, 2017	Composer Park Shi-chun	Park Sang-min	Lamenting Serenade (애수의 소야곡)	U Sung-eun & Bong9 (437)
312	July 15, 2017	Composer Park Shi-chun	Kim Nani & Jeong Seok-soon	Motionless Windmill (돌지 않는 풍차)	U Sung-eun & Bong9 (437)
312	July 15, 2017	Composer Park Shi-chun	No Brain	Parting at Busan (이별의 부산 정거장)	U Sung-eun & Bong9 (437)
312	July 15, 2017	Composer Park Shi-chun	Oh My Girl (Except: JinE)	Sweet 18 (낭랑 18세)	U Sung-eun & Bong9 (437)
312	July 15, 2017	Composer Park Shi-chun	U Sung-eun & Bong9 (GB9)	The Moonlight Night in Shilla (신라의 달밤)	U Sung-eun & Bong9 (437)
313	July 22, 2017	Summer Special Part 1: Summer Story with Your Friends	Song Jae-hee & Dohee	An Encounter by Chance (어쩌다 마주친 그대)	Ahn Se-ha & Sandeul (439)
313	July 22, 2017	Summer Special Part 1: Summer Story with Your Friends	Kim Ki-bang & Lyn	Uphill Road (오르막길)	Ahn Se-ha & Sandeul (439)
313	July 22, 2017	Summer Special Part 1: Summer Story with Your Friends	Lee Won-jong & Sung Ji-ru	Talk of Dreams (꿈의 대화)	Ahn Se-ha & Sandeul (439)
313	July 22, 2017	Summer Special Part 1: Summer Story with Your Friends	Kim Young-chul & Hwang Chi-yeul	Waves (파도)	Ahn Se-ha & Sandeul (439)
313	July 22, 2017	Summer Special Part 1: Summer Story with Your Friends	Yoon Hae-young & Jeong Won-yeong	Rain and You (비와 당신)	Ahn Se-ha & Sandeul (439)
313	July 22, 2017	Summer Special Part 1: Summer Story with Your Friends	Ahn Se-ha & Sandeul (B1A4)	The Flight (비상)	Ahn Se-ha & Sandeul (439)
314	July 29, 2017	Summer Special Part 2: Vacation with Music	Chae Yeon	If You Go to LA (나성에 가면)	Kim Tae-woo (428)
314	July 29, 2017	Summer Special Part 2: Vacation with Music	Jung Dong-ha	Busan Seagulls (부산 갈매기)	Kim Tae-woo (428)
314	July 29, 2017	Summer Special Part 2: Vacation with Music	Min Woo-hyuk	Yeongil Bay's Friend (영일만 친구)	Kim Tae-woo (428)
314	July 29, 2017	Summer Special Part 2: Vacation with Music	Lazybone	Mallipo Love (만리포 사랑)	Kim Tae-woo (428)
314	July 29, 2017	Summer Special Part 2: Vacation with Music	Park Hye-kyoung	Ulleungdo Twist (울릉도 트위스트)	Kim Tae-woo (428)
314	July 29, 2017	Summer Special Part 2: Vacation with Music	Kim Tae-woo	Gamsugwang (감수광)	Kim Tae-woo (428)
314	July 29, 2017	Summer Special Part 2: Vacation with Music	U Sung-eun & Bong9 (GB9)	Hong Kong Lady (홍콩 아가씨)	Kim Tae-woo (428)
315	August 5, 2017	Summer Special Part 3: Richard Marx	Bubble Sisters	Satisfied	Kim Jo-han (429)
315	August 5, 2017	Summer Special Part 3: Richard Marx	Kim Jo-han	Right Here Waiting	Kim Jo-han (429)
315	August 5, 2017	Summer Special Part 3: Richard Marx	Ali	Endless Summer Nights	Kim Jo-han (429)
315	August 5, 2017	Summer Special Part 3: Richard Marx	Nakjoon	Hold On to the Nights	Kim Jo-han (429)
315	August 5, 2017	Summer Special Part 3: Richard Marx	Ben & Im Se-jun	Now and Forever	Kim Jo-han (429)
315	August 5, 2017	Summer Special Part 3: Richard Marx	Jannabi	Don't Mean Nothing	Kim Jo-han (429)
316	August 12, 2017	Composer Jeong Doo-soo	Park Ki-young	Farewell in the Airport (공항의 이별)	Bong9 (435)
316	August 12, 2017	Composer Jeong Doo-soo	Cheon Dan-bi	Spinning a Water Mill (물레방아 도는데)	Bong9 (435)
316	August 12, 2017	Composer Jeong Doo-soo	Boohwal	Should Have a Beautiful Heart (마음이 고와야지)	Bong9 (435)
316	August 12, 2017	Composer Jeong Doo-soo	Nam Sang-il	A Soft Heart (마음 약해서)	Bong9 (435)
316	August 12, 2017	Composer Jeong Doo-soo	Min Woo-hyuk	Blues of Dusk (황혼의 부르스)	Bong9 (435)
316	August 12, 2017	Composer Jeong Doo-soo	Seenroot	Mapo Terminal (마포 종점)	Bong9 (435)
316	August 12, 2017	Composer Jeong Doo-soo	Bong9 (GB9)	Brokenhearted (가슴 아프게)	Bong9 (435)
317	August 19, 2017	Lee Eun-ha	Kim Yong-jun (SG Wannabe)	You Let Me Go with a Smile (미소를 띄우며 나를 보낸 그 모습처럼)	Choi Jung-won (433)
317	August 19, 2017	Lee Eun-ha	Lee Ye-joon	Winter Rose (겨울 장미)	Choi Jung-won (433)
317	August 19, 2017	Lee Eun-ha	Go Jae-geun	Spring Rain (봄비)	Choi Jung-won (433)
317	August 19, 2017	Lee Eun-ha	Lim Jeong-hee	Confusing (아리송해)	Choi Jung-won (433)
317	August 19, 2017	Lee Eun-ha	Oh Kevin	Still You Are My Love (아직도 그대는 내 사랑)	Choi Jung-won (433)
317	August 19, 2017	Lee Eun-ha	Laboum	Don't Look Back (돌이키지 마)	Choi Jung-won (433)
317	August 19, 2017	Lee Eun-ha	Choi Jung-won	Night Train (밤차)	Choi Jung-won (433)
318	August 26, 2017	DJ Doc	Kim Chung-ha	Run to you	Wanna One (423); Jisook & Goon jo (423)
318	August 26, 2017	DJ Doc	Hong Jin-young	Dance with DOC (DOC와 춤을)	Wanna One (423); Jisook & Goon jo (423)
318	August 26, 2017	DJ Doc	KCM	Remember (그녀의 속눈썹은 길다)	Wanna One (423); Jisook & Goon jo (423)
318	August 26, 2017	DJ Doc	Wanna One	Summer Story (여름 이야기)	Wanna One (423); Jisook & Goon jo (423)
318	August 26, 2017	DJ Doc	Untouchable	Sorrow of Superman (슈퍼맨의 비애)	Wanna One (423); Jisook & Goon jo (423)
318	August 26, 2017	DJ Doc	Jisook & Goon jo (Ulala Session)	OK? OK! (미녀와 야수)	Wanna One (423); Jisook & Goon jo (423)
318	August 26, 2017	DJ Doc	Muzie feat. Skull	Murphy's Law (머피의 법칙)	Wanna One (423); Jisook & Goon jo (423)
319	September 2, 2017	Seven Singers Sing Each Other's Songs	Yurisangja	A Sad Expression of Regret (슬픈 언약식) (Kim Jung-min)	Park Ki-young (439)
319	September 2, 2017	Seven Singers Sing Each Other's Songs	Kim Kyung-ho	You Do Not Answer (대답 없는 너) (Kim Jong-seo)	Park Ki-young (439)
319	September 2, 2017	Seven Singers Sing Each Other's Songs	Kim Jong-seo	Springtime in My Life (내 생에 봄날은...) (Can)	Park Ki-young (439)
319	September 2, 2017	Seven Singers Sing Each Other's Songs	Kim Jung-min	Broken Friendship (흔들린 우정) (Hong Kyung-min)	Park Ki-young (439)
319	September 2, 2017	Seven Singers Sing Each Other's Songs	Can	May I Love You? (사랑해도 될까요) (Yurisangja)	Park Ki-young (439)
319	September 2, 2017	Seven Singers Sing Each Other's Songs	Hong Kyung-min	Starting (시작) (Park Ki-young)	Park Ki-young (439)
319	September 2, 2017	Seven Singers Sing Each Other's Songs	Park Ki-young	Forbidden Love (금지된 사랑) (Kim Kyung-ho)	Park Ki-young (439)
320	September 9, 2017	Songwriter Kim Ki-pyo	GFriend	White Wind (하얀 바람)	Paul Potts & Bae Da-hae (431)
320	September 9, 2017	Songwriter Kim Ki-pyo	Oh Kevin	I Love Even Your Sorrow (그대 슬픔까지 사랑해)	Paul Potts & Bae Da-hae (431)
320	September 9, 2017	Songwriter Kim Ki-pyo	Han Dong-geun	Wandering (방황)	Paul Potts & Bae Da-hae (431)
320	September 9, 2017	Songwriter Kim Ki-pyo	Song So-hee & Ko Yeong-yeol	Seoul Woman (서울 여자)	Paul Potts & Bae Da-hae (431)
320	September 9, 2017	Songwriter Kim Ki-pyo	Ben	Love Is a Cold Temptation (사랑은 차가운 유혹)	Paul Potts & Bae Da-hae (431)
320	September 9, 2017	Songwriter Kim Ki-pyo	Paul Potts & Bae Da-hae	My Heart at Your Side (내 마음 당신 곁으로)	Paul Potts & Bae Da-hae (431)
320	September 9, 2017	Songwriter Kim Ki-pyo	Pristin	Crash-land of Love (사랑의 불시착)	Paul Potts & Bae Da-hae (431)
321	September 16, 2017	Singing Men on the Cusp of Autumn	Park Sang-min	They Said (...라구요)	Min Woo-hyuk (434)
321	September 16, 2017	Singing Men on the Cusp of Autumn	Kim Seong-myeon (K2)	Autumn Love (가을 사랑)	Min Woo-hyuk (434)
321	September 16, 2017	Singing Men on the Cusp of Autumn	Voisper	Forgotten Season (잊혀진 계절)	Min Woo-hyuk (434)
321	September 16, 2017	Singing Men on the Cusp of Autumn	Kim So-hyun & Son Jun-ho	Love is the Flower of Life (사랑은 생명의 꽃)	Min Woo-hyuk (434)
321	September 16, 2017	Singing Men on the Cusp of Autumn	Parc Jae-jung	Autumn Letter (가을엔 편지를 하겠어요)	Min Woo-hyuk (434)
321	September 16, 2017	Singing Men on the Cusp of Autumn	Hwang Chi-yeul	When I Stand Under the Shade of Roadside Tree (가로수 그늘 아래 서면)	Min Woo-hyuk (434)
321	September 16, 2017	Singing Men on the Cusp of Autumn	Min Woo-hyuk	Unsent Letter (부치지 않은 편지)	Min Woo-hyuk (434)
322	September 23, 2017	Lee Mi-ja	Lyn	The Island Teacher (섬마을 선생님)	Min Woo-hyuk (420)
322	September 23, 2017	Lee Mi-ja	Youme	Lady (아씨)	Min Woo-hyuk (420)
322	September 23, 2017	Lee Mi-ja	Baek A-yeon	A Woman's Life (여자의 일생)	Min Woo-hyuk (420)
322	September 23, 2017	Lee Mi-ja	Parc Jae-jung	Twilight Blues (황혼의 블루스)	Min Woo-hyuk (420)
322	September 23, 2017	Lee Mi-ja	Min Woo-hyuk	Journey (여로)	Min Woo-hyuk (420)
322	September 23, 2017	Lee Mi-ja	Hong Kyung-min	Farewell (작별)	Min Woo-hyuk (420)
323	September 30, 2017	Lee Mi-ja	Sonya	Tell Me, Mountain Yudal (유달산아 말해다오)	Lee Se-joon (424)
323	September 30, 2017	Lee Mi-ja	Kim Jae-hwan (Wanna One)	Goose Daddy (기러기 아빠)	Lee Se-joon (424)
323	September 30, 2017	Lee Mi-ja	Lee Ye-joon	Camellia Lady (동백아가씨)	Lee Se-joon (424)
323	September 30, 2017	Lee Mi-ja	Park Hye-shin	Sambaekri Hanryeosudo (삼백 리 한려수도)	Lee Se-joon (424)
323	September 30, 2017	Lee Mi-ja	Kim Yong-jun (SG Wannabe)	Goodbye Seoul (서울이여 안녕)	Lee Se-joon (424)
323	September 30, 2017	Lee Mi-ja	Lee Se-joon (Yurisangja)	One Flower (꽃 한 송이)	Lee Se-joon (424)
324	October 7, 2017	Chuseok Special with Family	Min Woo-hyuk & Semi (LPG)	Beautiful Restriction (아름다운 구속)	Eunkwang & Hwang Soon-ok (427)
324	October 7, 2017	Chuseok Special with Family	Jeong Seung-ho & Jeong Won-yeong	Soft Persimmon (홍시)	Eunkwang & Hwang Soon-ok (427)
324	October 7, 2017	Chuseok Special with Family	Hong Yoon-hwa & Kim Min-ki	Honey & I'm So Fortunate (다행이다)	Eunkwang & Hwang Soon-ok (427)
324	October 7, 2017	Chuseok Special with Family	Im Ha-ryong & Im Young-sik	Moon of Seoul (서울의 달)	Eunkwang & Hwang Soon-ok (427)
324	October 7, 2017	Chuseok Special with Family	Ali & Jo Yong-jun	A Tiring Day (지친 하루)	Eunkwang & Hwang Soon-ok (427)
324	October 7, 2017	Chuseok Special with Family	Eunkwang (BtoB) & Hwang Soon-ok	With Love (사랑으로)	Eunkwang & Hwang Soon-ok (427)
325	October 14, 2017	You Make This Song Even More Beautiful	Moon Myung-jin & The Ray	Farewell Journey (이별여행)	Jung Dong-ha & Paul Kim (439)
325	October 14, 2017	You Make This Song Even More Beautiful	Rose Motel & Lee Joo-hyuk (Gift)	With a Heart that Should Forget (잊어야 한다는 마음으로)	Jung Dong-ha & Paul Kim (439)
325	October 14, 2017	You Make This Song Even More Beautiful	Min Woo-hyuk & Woo Soo	In Your Dream (너의 꿈 속에서) (from musical Frankenstein (프랑켄슈타인))	Jung Dong-ha & Paul Kim (439)
325	October 14, 2017	You Make This Song Even More Beautiful	Kim Kyung-ho & Kwak Dong-hyun	Toward Tomorrow (내일을 향해)	Jung Dong-ha & Paul Kim (439)
325	October 14, 2017	You Make This Song Even More Beautiful	Youme & Kim Yong-jin (Bohemian)	My Love by My Side (내 사랑 내 곁에)	Jung Dong-ha & Paul Kim (439)
325	October 14, 2017	You Make This Song Even More Beautiful	Jung Dong-ha & Paul Kim	Girl (소녀)	Jung Dong-ha & Paul Kim (439)
326	October 21, 2017	Shin Hae-chul	Hong Kyung-min & Second Moon	An Invitation to Daily Life (일상으로의 초대)	4Men (436)
326	October 21, 2017	Shin Hae-chul	Monni	A Letter to Myself (나에게 쓰는 편지)	4Men (436)
326	October 21, 2017	Shin Hae-chul	Kim Hyun-sung feat. N.EX.T	Here, I Stand For You	4Men (436)
326	October 21, 2017	Shin Hae-chul	Yuju (GFriend)	When Our Lives End (우리 앞의 생이 끝나갈 때)	4Men (436)
326	October 21, 2017	Shin Hae-chul	Parc Jae-jung	Don't Be Sad (슬픈 표정 하지 말아요)	4Men (436)
326	October 21, 2017	Shin Hae-chul	4Men	You Are Deep Inside My Heart (내 마음 깊은 곳의 너)	4Men (436)
326	October 21, 2017	Shin Hae-chul	Voisper	The Knight of a Doll Part.Il (인형의 기사 Part II)	4Men (436)
327	October 28, 2017	Kim Kwang-seok	Son Seung-yeon	Though I Loved You (사랑했지만)	Voisper (430)
327	October 28, 2017	Kim Kwang-seok	Kim Yong-jin (Bohemian)	Love That Is Too Painful Isn't Love (너무 아픈 사랑은 사랑이 아니었음을)	Voisper (430)
327	October 28, 2017	Kim Kwang-seok	Homme	Around 30 (서른 즈음에)	Voisper (430)
327	October 28, 2017	Kim Kwang-seok	Son Ho-young	Those Days (그 날들)	Voisper (430)
327	October 28, 2017	Kim Kwang-seok	Hong Kyung-min, Lee Se-joon (Yurisangja), Yoon Hee-seok, Choi Seung-yeol & Im Jin-ung	A Letter to a Cloudy Autumn Sky (흐린 가을 하늘에 편지를 써)	Voisper (430)
327	October 28, 2017	Kim Kwang-seok	Baek A-yeon	On the Street (거리에서)	Voisper (430)
327	October 28, 2017	Kim Kwang-seok	Voisper	For all the Privates who left home (이등병의 편지)	Voisper (430)
328	November 4, 2017	Composer Park Hyun-jin	Voisper	Impatiens Love (봉선화 연정)	Son Jun-ho & Kim Sang-jin (432)
328	November 4, 2017	Composer Park Hyun-jin	DIA	Unconditional (무조건)	Son Jun-ho & Kim Sang-jin (432)
328	November 4, 2017	Composer Park Hyun-jin	Chae Yeon	If I Am Shaken with the Wind or Get Wet With Rain (바람에 흔들리고 비에 젖어도)	Son Jun-ho & Kim Sang-jin (432)
328	November 4, 2017	Composer Park Hyun-jin	Goon jo (Ulala Session) feat. Chung Kang-hee	Sintoburi (신토불이)	Son Jun-ho & Kim Sang-jin (432)
328	November 4, 2017	Composer Park Hyun-jin	Son Jun-ho & Kim Sang-jin	Four Beats (네 박자)	Son Jun-ho & Kim Sang-jin (432)
328	November 4, 2017	Composer Park Hyun-jin	Park Ki-young	The Southern Man, the Northern Woman (남남북녀)	Son Jun-ho & Kim Sang-jin (432)
328	November 4, 2017	Composer Park Hyun-jin	Son Seung-yeon	Only (뿐이고)	Son Jun-ho & Kim Sang-jin (432)
329	November 11, 2017	Park Gang-sung	Youme	I Can't Look at You (바라볼 수 없는 그대)	Huh Gak (434)
329	November 11, 2017	Park Gang-sung	Kim Beop-rae	Trace (흔적)	Huh Gak (434)
329	November 11, 2017	Park Gang-sung	Kim Yong-jin (Bohemian)	After the Breakup (이별 그 후)	Huh Gak (434)
329	November 11, 2017	Park Gang-sung	Bae Da-hae	Looking at You from Behind in the Rain (그대 뒷모습에 비는 내리고)	Huh Gak (434)
329	November 11, 2017	Park Gang-sung	NAVI	Waiting for Tomorrow (내일을 기다려)	Huh Gak (434)
329	November 11, 2017	Park Gang-sung	KCM	Toy Soldier (장난감 병정)	Huh Gak (434)
329	November 11, 2017	Park Gang-sung	Huh Gak	You Outside the Door (문 밖에 있는 그대)	Huh Gak (434)
330	November 18, 2017	Composer Yoon Il-sang	Ailee	I Have a Lover (애인... 있어요)	Davichi (443)
330	November 18, 2017	Composer Yoon Il-sang	Wheesung feat. V-Hawk	Reminiscence (회상)	Davichi (443)
330	November 18, 2017	Composer Yoon Il-sang	Goon jo (Ulala Session)	Amor Fati (아모르 파티)	Davichi (443)
330	November 18, 2017	Composer Yoon Il-sang	Kim Jae-hwan (Wanna One)	Forget You (잊을게)	Davichi (443)
330	November 18, 2017	Composer Yoon Il-sang	DK (December)	Fate (인연)	Davichi (443)
330	November 18, 2017	Composer Yoon Il-sang	Son Seung-yeon	I Miss You (보고 싶다)	Davichi (443)
330	November 18, 2017	Composer Yoon Il-sang	Davichi	Last Love (끝사랑)	Davichi (443)
331	December 2, 2017	The Seven, Singing Their Passion	Kim Jin-woo	Love Again (또 다시 사랑)	Park Joon-myeon (431)
331	December 2, 2017	The Seven, Singing Their Passion	Park Ki-ryang	Joy (환희)	Park Joon-myeon (431)
331	December 2, 2017	The Seven, Singing Their Passion	Choi Il-hwa	Teahouse of the Winter (그 겨울의 찻집)	Park Joon-myeon (431)
331	December 2, 2017	The Seven, Singing Their Passion	Hong Kyung-in	Beautiful Goodbye (아름다운 이별)	Park Joon-myeon (431)
331	December 2, 2017	The Seven, Singing Their Passion	Park Joon-myeon	Last Station for Farewell (이별의 종착역)	Park Joon-myeon (431)
331	December 2, 2017	The Seven, Singing Their Passion	Kim Myeong-guk	In the Rain (빗속에서)	Park Joon-myeon (431)
331	December 2, 2017	The Seven, Singing Their Passion	Boom	Saturday Night Fever (토요일은 밤이 좋아)	Park Joon-myeon (431)
332	December 9, 2017	Shin Jung-hyeon	Choi Seung-yeol	You (님아)	Ali (421)
332	December 9, 2017	Shin Jung-hyeon	Astro	Beautiful Lady (미인)	Ali (421)
332	December 9, 2017	Shin Jung-hyeon	Boohwal	Don't Tell Me You're Going (간다고 하지 마오)	Ali (421)
332	December 9, 2017	Shin Jung-hyeon	DK (December) feat. Kang Min-jeong	The One Who Will Leave (떠나야 할 그 사람)	Ali (421)
332	December 9, 2017	Shin Jung-hyeon	Park Ki-young	Spring Rain (봄비)	Ali (421)
332	December 9, 2017	Shin Jung-hyeon	Ali	A Lie (거짓말이야)	Ali (421)
333	December 16, 2017	Shin Jung-hyeon	Song So-hee	I Will Forget You (나는 너를)	Mamamoo (432)
333	December 16, 2017	Shin Jung-hyeon	Rose Motel	Woman in the Rain (빗속의 여인)	Mamamoo (432)
333	December 16, 2017	Shin Jung-hyeon	Son Seung-yeon	Beautiful Country (아름다운 강산)	Mamamoo (432)
333	December 16, 2017	Shin Jung-hyeon	Yangpa	One Cup of Coffee (커피 한 잔)	Mamamoo (432)
333	December 16, 2017	Shin Jung-hyeon	Mamamoo	The Dance in Rhythm (리듬 속의 그 춤을)	Mamamoo (432)
333	December 16, 2017	Shin Jung-hyeon	Kim Yong-jin (Bohemian)	A Petal (꽃잎)	Mamamoo (432)
334	December 23, 2017	King of Kings Special	Ahn Se-ha & Sandeul (B1A4)	Passing (지나간다)	Min Woo-hyuk (422)
334	December 23, 2017	King of Kings Special	Jung Dong-ha	Is Anyone There (누구 없소)	Min Woo-hyuk (422)
334	December 23, 2017	King of Kings Special	Yangpa	Ask to Sowol (소월에게 묻기를)	Min Woo-hyuk (422)
334	December 23, 2017	King of Kings Special	Goon jo (Ulala Session)	As I Told You (말하자면)	Min Woo-hyuk (422)
334	December 23, 2017	King of Kings Special	Min Woo-hyuk	Dream (꿈)	Min Woo-hyuk (422)
334	December 23, 2017	King of Kings Special	Voisper	Snow Flower (눈의 꽃)	Min Woo-hyuk (422)
335	December 30, 2017	King of Kings Special	Kim Tae-woo	Tuning (조율)	KCM (442)
335	December 30, 2017	King of Kings Special	Eunkwang (BtoB)	A Thorn Tree (가시나무)	KCM (442)
335	December 30, 2017	King of Kings Special	Homme	The Wind Blows (바람이 분다)	KCM (442)
335	December 30, 2017	King of Kings Special	Son Jun-ho & Kim Sang-jin	Belle (아름답다) & Le Temps des Cathédrales (대성당들의 시대) (from musical Notre-Dame de Paris (노트르담 파리))	KCM (442)
335	December 30, 2017	King of Kings Special	Park Ki-young	O Holy Night	KCM (442)
335	December 30, 2017	King of Kings Special	KCM	Spring in My Hometown (고향의 봄)	KCM (442)

=== 2018 ===
List of episodes aired in 2018

Singers listed in order of performance.

Episode #	Broadcast Date	Legend or Theme	Guest Singers	Songs	Final Winner (Votes)
336	January 6, 2018	New Year Special	Choi Song-hyun	The Pierrot Smiles at Us (삐에로는 우릴 보고 웃지)	Song Young-kyu (423)
336	January 6, 2018	New Year Special	Kim Yong-jin (Bohemian)	Wind Song (바람의 노래)	Song Young-kyu (423)
336	January 6, 2018	New Year Special	Lee Jung-sub	I Have to Go (나는 가야지)	Song Young-kyu (423)
336	January 6, 2018	New Year Special	Youngji	Festival	Song Young-kyu (423)
336	January 6, 2018	New Year Special	Choi Byung-suh	Friend (친구여)	Song Young-kyu (423)
336	January 6, 2018	New Year Special	Song Young-kyu	As You Live in This World (이 세상 살아가다 보면)	Song Young-kyu (423)
337	January 13, 2018	Lyricist Lee Kun-woo	KARD	Wingless Angel (날개 잃은 천사)	GB9 (416)
337	January 13, 2018	Lyricist Lee Kun-woo	Boom	Ecstatic Proposal (황홀한 고백)	GB9 (416)
337	January 13, 2018	Lyricist Lee Kun-woo	Bae Da-hae	Not Anyone Can Love (사랑은 아무나 하나)	GB9 (416)
337	January 13, 2018	Lyricist Lee Kun-woo	NRG	On the Phone (통화 중)	GB9 (416)
337	January 13, 2018	Lyricist Lee Kun-woo	Hong Kyung-min	Secret Garden (비원)	GB9 (416)
337	January 13, 2018	Lyricist Lee Kun-woo	GB9	Are You Crying (그대 우나 봐)	GB9 (416)
337	January 13, 2018	Lyricist Lee Kun-woo	Goon Jo (Ulala Session)	Speed (스피드)	GB9 (416)
338	January 20, 2018	The Seven Voices of 2018	Voisper	I Love You (난 널 사랑해)	Kim Yong-jin (421)
338	January 20, 2018	The Seven Voices of 2018	Yu Tae-Pyongyang	Moon of Seoul (서울의 달)	Kim Yong-jin (421)
338	January 20, 2018	The Seven Voices of 2018	Kim Yong-jin (Bohemian)	Don't You Worry (걱정 말아요, 그대)	Kim Yong-jin (421)
338	January 20, 2018	The Seven Voices of 2018	Parc Jae-jung	When Spring Comes (꽃피는 봄이 오면)	Kim Yong-jin (421)
338	January 20, 2018	The Seven Voices of 2018	GB9	Only the Sound of Her Laughter (그녀의 웃음소리뿐)	Kim Yong-jin (421)
338	January 20, 2018	The Seven Voices of 2018	Baek A-yeon	Dream of a Doll (인형의 꿈)	Kim Yong-jin (421)
338	January 20, 2018	The Seven Voices of 2018	Min Woo-hyuk	Always You're by My Side (언제나 그대 내 곁에)	Kim Yong-jin (421)
339	January 27, 2018	Lee Sang-woo	Park Ki-young	Like the Collar Sways in the Wind (바람에 옷깃이 날리듯)	Kim Nani & Jeong Seok-soon (434)
339	January 27, 2018	Lee Sang-woo	Kim Yong-jin (Bohemian)	Love Like a Sad Picture (슬픈 그림 같은 사랑)	Kim Nani & Jeong Seok-soon (434)
339	January 27, 2018	Lee Sang-woo	Day6	Now (이젠)	Kim Nani & Jeong Seok-soon (434)
339	January 27, 2018	Lee Sang-woo	Ali	Pathetique (비창)	Kim Nani & Jeong Seok-soon (434)
339	January 27, 2018	Lee Sang-woo	Paul Kim	A Night's Dream (하룻밤의 꿈)	Kim Nani & Jeong Seok-soon (434)
339	January 27, 2018	Lee Sang-woo	Lee Ha-rin	100m Before Meeting Her (그녀를 만나는 곳 100m 전)	Kim Nani & Jeong Seok-soon (434)
339	January 27, 2018	Lee Sang-woo	Kim Nani & Jeong Seok-soon	Unfillable Vacancy (채워지지 않는 빈 자리)	Kim Nani & Jeong Seok-soon (434)
340	February 3, 2018	Lee Ho-seop & Kim Yon-ja	Min Woo-hyuk	Square One (원점)	Kim Kyung-ho (439)
340	February 3, 2018	Lee Ho-seop & Kim Yon-ja	Youngjae (Got7)	Mercury Lamp (수은등)	Kim Kyung-ho (439)
340	February 3, 2018	Lee Ho-seop & Kim Yon-ja	Yu Tae-pyeong-yang	Memory (추억) & In Your Memories (추억으로 가는 당신)	Kim Kyung-ho (439)
340	February 3, 2018	Lee Ho-seop & Kim Yon-ja	Kim So-hyun & Son Jun-ho	Nation of Morning (아침의 나라에서)	Kim Kyung-ho (439)
340	February 3, 2018	Lee Ho-seop & Kim Yon-ja	U Sung-eun	Unrequited Love (짝사랑)	Kim Kyung-ho (439)
340	February 3, 2018	Lee Ho-seop & Kim Yon-ja	Kim Kyung-ho feat. Woo Jong-sun (Method)	Amor Fati (아모르 파티)	Kim Kyung-ho (439)
340	February 3, 2018	Lee Ho-seop & Kim Yon-ja	Soran	Within Ten Minutes (10분 내로)	Kim Kyung-ho (439)
341	February 10, 2018	Composer Kim Hyeong-seok	Jo Kwon	Holding on to the End of Tonight (이 밤의 끝을 잡고)	Park Ki-young (422)
341	February 10, 2018	Composer Kim Hyeong-seok	Kim Chung-ha	Killer & Get Up	Park Ki-young (422)
341	February 10, 2018	Composer Kim Hyeong-seok	KCM	Come Back to Me Again (그대 내게 다시)	Park Ki-young (422)
341	February 10, 2018	Composer Kim Hyeong-seok	Kim Yong-jin (Bohemian)	I Believe	Park Ki-young (422)
341	February 10, 2018	Composer Kim Hyeong-seok	Lee Se-joon (Yurisangja)	Again (그때 또 다시)	Park Ki-young (422)
341	February 10, 2018	Composer Kim Hyeong-seok	Paul Kim	A Reason Called Love (사랑이라는 이유로)	Park Ki-young (422)
341	February 10, 2018	Composer Kim Hyeong-seok	Park Ki-young	Like the First Day (처음 그 날처럼)	Park Ki-young (422)
342	February 17, 2018	Seollal Season Special: Favorite Karaoke Titles	Wax	For You (너를 위해)	Wheesung (422)
342	February 17, 2018	Seollal Season Special: Favorite Karaoke Titles	Park Ye-seul	The Man from Back Then (그때 그 사람)	Wheesung (422)
342	February 17, 2018	Seollal Season Special: Favorite Karaoke Titles	Hyunsik (BtoB)	Emergency Room (응급실)	Wheesung (422)
342	February 17, 2018	Seollal Season Special: Favorite Karaoke Titles	Kim Jung-min	No Matter What (무조건)	Wheesung (422)
342	February 17, 2018	Seollal Season Special: Favorite Karaoke Titles	Drug Restaurant	Love Two (사랑 Two)	Wheesung (422)
342	February 17, 2018	Seollal Season Special: Favorite Karaoke Titles	Wheesung	Drunken Truth (취중진담)	Wheesung (422)
343	February 24, 2018	Seollal Season Special: Favorite Karaoke Titles	Kim Yong-jin (Bohemian)	At Any Time (무시로)	No Brain (438)
343	February 24, 2018	Seollal Season Special: Favorite Karaoke Titles	Youngji	Bruise (멍)	No Brain (438)
343	February 24, 2018	Seollal Season Special: Favorite Karaoke Titles	Chung Young-ju	Chilgapsan (칠갑산)	No Brain (438)
343	February 24, 2018	Seollal Season Special: Favorite Karaoke Titles	Lee Hyun (Homme)	A Shot of Soju (소주 한 잔)	No Brain (438)
343	February 24, 2018	Seollal Season Special: Favorite Karaoke Titles	No Brain	Tears	No Brain (438)
343	February 24, 2018	Seollal Season Special: Favorite Karaoke Titles	Hong Jin-young	Sexy Man (섹시한 남자)	No Brain (438)
Special	March 3, 2018	KBS 45th Anniversary Special	Yoon Bok-hee, Ali, Jung Dong-ha, Hwang Chi-yeul & Min Woo-hyuk	Everyone (여러분)	
Special	March 3, 2018	KBS 45th Anniversary Special	Nam Hyun-joon & Park Ae-ri	Arirang (아리랑)	
Special	March 3, 2018	KBS 45th Anniversary Special	Ali	For Once in My Life (내 생애 단 한 번만)	
Special	March 3, 2018	KBS 45th Anniversary Special	Yoon Bok-hee	Musical Jesus Christ Superstar (지저스 크라이스트 슈퍼스타) medley	
Special	March 3, 2018	KBS 45th Anniversary Special	Choi Jung-won	Musical medley	
Special	March 3, 2018	KBS 45th Anniversary Special	Kim So-hyun & Son Jun-ho	The State Examination (무과시험) & Rise, All Subjects (백성이여 일어나라) (from musical The Last Empress (명성황후))	
Special	March 3, 2018	KBS 45th Anniversary Special	Hwang Chi-yeul	Joy (환희)	
Special	March 3, 2018	KBS 45th Anniversary Special	Jung Dong-ha	The Flight (비상)	
Special	March 3, 2018	KBS 45th Anniversary Special	Min Woo-hyuk	The Leopard of Kilimanjaro (킬리만자로의 표범)	
Special	March 3, 2018	KBS 45th Anniversary Special	Ahn Sook-sun	Love Song (사랑가) (from pansori Chunhyangga (춘향가))	
Special	March 3, 2018	KBS 45th Anniversary Special	Ahn Sook-sun & Nam Sang-il	Cutting a Gourd (흥보 박타는 대목) (from pansori Heungbuga (흥보가))	
Special	March 3, 2018	KBS 45th Anniversary Special	Song So-hee & Ko Yeong-yeol	You Say It's Over (이별이래)	
Special	March 3, 2018	KBS 45th Anniversary Special	Choi Baek-ho & Lyn	About Romance (낭만에 대하여) & Burden (멍에)	
Special	March 3, 2018	KBS 45th Anniversary Special	Park Ki-young & Kim Hyuk-gun (The Cross)	The Prayer	
Special	March 3, 2018	KBS 45th Anniversary Special	Hong Kyung-min & Um Hong-gil	Evergreen Tree (상록수)	
Special	March 3, 2018	KBS 45th Anniversary Special	Yang Hee-eun	I Like It (참 좋다)	
Special	March 3, 2018	KBS 45th Anniversary Special	Yang Hee-eun & other guests	Morning Dew (아침 이슬)	
344	March 10, 2018	Composer Lee Young-hoon	Kim Kyung-ho	Gwanghwamun Love Song (광화문 연가)	Tei (432)
344	March 10, 2018	Composer Lee Young-hoon	Kim Ji-woo & Choi Jae-rim	Flying in the Deep Night (깊은 밤을 날아서)	Tei (432)
344	March 10, 2018	Composer Lee Young-hoon	Vromance	Sunset Glow (붉은 노을)	Tei (432)
344	March 10, 2018	Composer Lee Young-hoon	Jung Dong-ha	I Don't Know Yet (난 아직 모르잖아요)	Tei (432)
344	March 10, 2018	Composer Lee Young-hoon	Cheon Dan-bi	When I Stand Under the Shade of Roadside Tree (가로수 그늘 아래 서면)	Tei (432)
344	March 10, 2018	Composer Lee Young-hoon	Kim Nani & Jeong Seok-soon	Old Love (옛 사랑)	Tei (432)
344	March 10, 2018	Composer Lee Young-hoon	Tei	Farewell Story (이별 이야기)	Tei (432)
345	March 17, 2018	Jang Gyeong-su	Kim Yong-jin (Bohemian)	Thousand Year Stone (천년바위)	Chung Young-ju (429)
345	March 17, 2018	Jang Gyeong-su	V.O.S	Baby Doll (꼬마 인형)	Chung Young-ju (429)
345	March 17, 2018	Jang Gyeong-su	UNB	Note of Youth (젊음의 노트)	Chung Young-ju (429)
345	March 17, 2018	Jang Gyeong-su	Yurisangja	Maybe It Was a Dream (꿈이였나 봐)	Chung Young-ju (429)
345	March 17, 2018	Jang Gyeong-su	Chung Young-ju	Woman from Casbah (카스바의 여인)	Chung Young-ju (429)
345	March 17, 2018	Jang Gyeong-su	Yu Tae-Pyongyang	I've Heard Rumors (풍문으로 들었소)	Chung Young-ju (429)
345	March 17, 2018	Jang Gyeong-su	Soran	Because of Affection (정 때문에)	Chung Young-ju (429)
346	March 24, 2018	Legendary Songs in Textbooks	Kim Yong-jin (Bohemian) feat. Kim So-hyun	Nostalgia (향수)	Min Woo-hyuk (449)
346	March 24, 2018	Legendary Songs in Textbooks	Song So-hee & Second Moon	Face (얼굴)	Min Woo-hyuk (449)
346	March 24, 2018	Legendary Songs in Textbooks	Momoland	Balloons (풍선)	Min Woo-hyuk (449)
346	March 24, 2018	Legendary Songs in Textbooks	V.O.S	We Are (우리는)	Min Woo-hyuk (449)
346	March 24, 2018	Legendary Songs in Textbooks	Sonya	Tearful Tumen River (눈물 젖은 두만강)	Min Woo-hyuk (449)
346	March 24, 2018	Legendary Songs in Textbooks	Park Ye-seul	Come Back to Busan Port (돌아와요 부산항에)	Min Woo-hyuk (449)
346	March 24, 2018	Legendary Songs in Textbooks	Min Woo-hyuk	Death Song (사의 찬미)	Min Woo-hyuk (449)
347	March 31, 2018	Composer Gil Ok-yun	Boohwal	The Third Bridge (제 3한강교)	Baek Hyeong-hun & Ki Se-jung (395)
347	March 31, 2018	Composer Gil Ok-yun	Park Ki-young	My Love (내 사랑아)	Baek Hyeong-hun & Ki Se-jung (395)
347	March 31, 2018	Composer Gil Ok-yun	Voisper	Can't Live Without You (그대 없이는 못 살아)	Baek Hyeong-hun & Ki Se-jung (395)
347	March 31, 2018	Composer Gil Ok-yun	Baek Hyeong-hun & Ki Se-jung	Love Forever (사랑은 영원히)	Baek Hyeong-hun & Ki Se-jung (395)
347	March 31, 2018	Composer Gil Ok-yun	No Brain	A Song of Seoul (서울의 찬가)	Baek Hyeong-hun & Ki Se-jung (395)
347	March 31, 2018	Composer Gil Ok-yun	Kixs (DMTN) feat. Dari (DMTN)	You Will Not Know (당신은 모르실 거야)	Baek Hyeong-hun & Ki Se-jung (395)
348	April 7, 2018	Composer Gil Ok-yun	Park Sang-min	Light and Shadow (빛과 그림자)	Choi Jung-won (432)
348	April 7, 2018	Composer Gil Ok-yun	Choi Jung-won	As I Live (사노라면)	Choi Jung-won (432)
348	April 7, 2018	Composer Gil Ok-yun	Uni.T	If You Go to LA (나성에 가면)	Choi Jung-won (432)
348	April 7, 2018	Composer Gil Ok-yun	GB9	Daybreak Rain (새벽비)	Choi Jung-won (432)
348	April 7, 2018	Composer Gil Ok-yun	Kim Yong-jin (Bohemian)	Farewell (이별)	Choi Jung-won (432)
348	April 7, 2018	Composer Gil Ok-yun	Kim Nani & Jeong Seok-soon	Love, Once Again (사랑이여 다시 한 번)	Choi Jung-won (432)
349	April 14, 2018	Let's Sing Spring	MAMAMOO	Violet Fragrance (보랏빛 향기)	MeloMance (423)
349	April 14, 2018	Let's Sing Spring	Nam Hyun-joon & Park Ae-ri ft. DJ Koo	With You (님과 함께)	MeloMance (423)
349	April 14, 2018	Let's Sing Spring	Lee Se-joon (Yurisangja)	Thought of You (그리움만 쌓이네)	MeloMance (423)
349	April 14, 2018	Let's Sing Spring	Weki Meki	Sweety	MeloMance (423)
349	April 14, 2018	Let's Sing Spring	MeloMance	Goodbye (안녕)	MeloMance (423)
349	April 14, 2018	Let's Sing Spring	Youme	Wild Rose (찔레꽃)	MeloMance (423)
349	April 14, 2018	Let's Sing Spring	GB9	You and I (그대 그리고 나)	MeloMance (423)
350	April 21, 2018	Cho Yong-pil	Lena Park	The Woman Outside the Window (창 밖의 여자)	Kim Kyung-ho (405)
350	April 21, 2018	Cho Yong-pil	Kim Kyung-ho	Fire Cracker of Asia (아시아의 불꽃)	Kim Kyung-ho (405)
350	April 21, 2018	Cho Yong-pil	Hwanhee (Fly to the Sky)	Mona Lisa (모나리자)	Kim Kyung-ho (405)
350	April 21, 2018	Cho Yong-pil	Kim So-hyun & Son Jun-ho	The Unknown World (미지의 세계)	Kim Kyung-ho (405)
350	April 21, 2018	Cho Yong-pil	Kim Tae-woo	Friend (친구여)	Kim Kyung-ho (405)
351	April 28, 2018	Cho Yong-pil	Ali	That's My Life Too (그 또한 내 삶인데)	Lyn (428)
351	April 28, 2018	Cho Yong-pil	Kim Jong-seo	I Can't Find the Nightingale (못 찾겠다 꾀꼬리)	Lyn (428)
351	April 28, 2018	Cho Yong-pil	Ha Dong-kyun	Wind Song (바람의 노래)	Lyn (428)
351	April 28, 2018	Cho Yong-pil	Bada	Dream (꿈)	Lyn (428)
351	April 28, 2018	Cho Yong-pil	Lyn	Red Dragonfly (고추잠자리)	Lyn (428)
352	May 5, 2018	Cho Yong-pil	Jung Dong-ha	Tragic Love (비련)	Seventeen (432)
352	May 5, 2018	Cho Yong-pil	Davichi	I Wish Now It Will Be That (이젠 그랬으면 좋겠네)	Seventeen (432)
352	May 5, 2018	Cho Yong-pil	Seventeen	Short Hair (단발머리)	Seventeen (432)
352	May 5, 2018	Cho Yong-pil	Min Woo-hyuk	Lonely Runner (고독한 Runner)	Seventeen (432)
352	May 5, 2018	Cho Yong-pil	Han Dong-geun	Teahouse of the Winter (그 겨울의 찻집)	Seventeen (432)
352	May 5, 2018	Cho Yong-pil	Rose Motel	Let's Go on a Trip (여행을 떠나요)	Seventeen (432)
353	May 12, 2018	Shane Filan	Baek Hyeong-hun & Ki Se-jung	Uptown Girl	V.O.S (429)
353	May 12, 2018	Shane Filan	Eric Nam	The Rose & My Love	V.O.S (429)
353	May 12, 2018	Shane Filan	Sohyang	You Raise Me Up	V.O.S (429)
353	May 12, 2018	Shane Filan	Lee Hyun (Homme)	Fool Again	V.O.S (429)
353	May 12, 2018	Shane Filan	Ali	Flying Without Wings	V.O.S (429)
353	May 12, 2018	Shane Filan	V.O.S	World of Our Own	V.O.S (429)
354	May 19, 2018	Songwriter Park Joo-yeon	UNI.T	Let's leave now (이제 떠나가 볼까)	Jung Seung-hwan (393)
354	May 19, 2018	Songwriter Park Joo-yeon	Ben	Shade of farewell (이별의 그늘)	Jung Seung-hwan (393)
354	May 19, 2018	Songwriter Park Joo-yeon	Lee Hyuk	One thing I know (내가 아는 한 가지)	Jung Seung-hwan (393)
354	May 19, 2018	Songwriter Park Joo-yeon	Park Hye-kyoung	For the love that I saved (아껴둔 사랑을 위해)	Jung Seung-hwan (393)
354	May 19, 2018	Songwriter Park Joo-yeon	Lee Hyun (Homme)	If you are like me (나와 같다면)	Jung Seung-hwan (393)
354	May 19, 2018	Songwriter Park Joo-yeon	Jung Seung-hwan	Love is forgotten by another love (사랑이 다른 사랑으로 잊혀지네)	Jung Seung-hwan (393)
355	May 26, 2018	Songwriter Park Joo-yeon	Jo Hyun-ah (Urban Zakapa)	Farewell for me (날 위한 이별)	Lee Ji-hoon (427)
355	May 26, 2018	Songwriter Park Joo-yeon	Hong Jin-young	Change	Lee Ji-hoon (427)
355	May 26, 2018	Songwriter Park Joo-yeon	Baek Hyeong-hun & Ki Se-jung	Your wedding (너의 결혼식)	Lee Ji-hoon (427)
355	May 26, 2018	Songwriter Park Joo-yeon	Yurisangja	It's just love. (사랑일 뿐야)	Lee Ji-hoon (427)
355	May 26, 2018	Songwriter Park Joo-yeon	Lee Ji-hoon	To you again (너에게로 또 다시)	Lee Ji-hoon (427)
355	May 26, 2018	Songwriter Park Joo-yeon	V.O.S	Again (그 때 또 다시)	Lee Ji-hoon (427)
356	June 2, 2018	Foreign Stars Who Love Korea Special	Robin Deiana ( France )	Without You (너 없는 동안)	Greg Priester (419)
356	June 2, 2018	Foreign Stars Who Love Korea Special	Christina Confalonieri feat. Kim Hyun-joon ( Italy )	Fly Me to the Moon	Greg Priester (419)
356	June 2, 2018	Foreign Stars Who Love Korea Special	Sam Okyere feat. Lee Eun-bi ( Ghana )	Do Not Leave Me (날 떠나지 마)	Greg Priester (419)
356	June 2, 2018	Foreign Stars Who Love Korea Special	Sime (EXP EDITION) ( Croatia )	Never Ending Story	Greg Priester (419)
356	June 2, 2018	Foreign Stars Who Love Korea Special	Cao Lu ( China )	Purple Scent (보랏빛 향기)	Greg Priester (419)
356	June 2, 2018	Foreign Stars Who Love Korea Special	Greg Priester ( United States )	To J (J에게)	Greg Priester (419)
357	June 9, 2018	Jung Hoon-hee	Soran	Fog (안개)	Yang Dong-geun (424)
357	June 9, 2018	Jung Hoon-hee	Lee Hyun (Homme)	Deserted Island (무인도)	Yang Dong-geun (424)
357	June 9, 2018	Jung Hoon-hee	Forte di Quattro	We Are One (우리는 하나)	Yang Dong-geun (424)
357	June 9, 2018	Jung Hoon-hee	K.Will	Flower Garden (꽃밭에서)	Yang Dong-geun (424)
357	June 9, 2018	Jung Hoon-hee	Park Ki-young	Ask to Sowol (소월에게 묻기를)	Yang Dong-geun (424)
357	June 9, 2018	Jung Hoon-hee	Ko Yeong-yeol & Seunghee (Oh My Girl)	A Love Song (연가)	Yang Dong-geun (424)
357	June 9, 2018	Jung Hoon-hee	Yang Dong-geun	He's a Fool (그 사람 바보야)	Yang Dong-geun (424)
358	June 23, 2018	Jang Yun-jeong	Navi	Jjan Jja Ra (짠짜라)	Kim Yong-jin (419)
358	June 23, 2018	Jang Yun-jeong	Voisper	Ollae (올래)	Kim Yong-jin (419)
358	June 23, 2018	Jang Yun-jeong	Son Jun-ho	Call the Soul (초혼)	Kim Yong-jin (419)
358	June 23, 2018	Jang Yun-jeong	Ryu Won-jeong	Flower (꽃)	Kim Yong-jin (419)
358	June 23, 2018	Jang Yun-jeong	Solbi & Goon-jo	I Like You (당신이 좋아)	Kim Yong-jin (419)
358	June 23, 2018	Jang Yun-jeong	Lovelyz	Oh My Goodness (어머나)	Kim Yong-jin (419)
358	June 23, 2018	Jang Yun-jeong	Kim Yong-jin (Bohemian)	I'm Worried (애가 타)	Kim Yong-jin (419)
359	June 30, 2018	1st Half of 2018 Winners	Jung Seung-hwan	Myself Reflected in My Mind (내 마음에 비친 내 모습)	Kim Na-ni & Jeong Seok-soon (428)
359	June 30, 2018	1st Half of 2018 Winners	Lee Ji-hoon	Reflection of You in Your Smile (미소 속에 비친 그대)	Kim Na-ni & Jeong Seok-soon (428)
359	June 30, 2018	1st Half of 2018 Winners	Yang Dong-geun feat. Manuka	It's a Fireball (불놀이야)	Kim Na-ni & Jeong Seok-soon (428)
359	June 30, 2018	1st Half of 2018 Winners	Tei	Evergreen Tree (상록수)	Kim Na-ni & Jeong Seok-soon (428)
359	June 30, 2018	1st Half of 2018 Winners	V.O.S	Get Up (일어나)	Kim Na-ni & Jeong Seok-soon (428)
359	June 30, 2018	1st Half of 2018 Winners	Kim Kyung-ho	Pick Me (나야 나)	Kim Na-ni & Jeong Seok-soon (428)
359	June 30, 2018	1st Half of 2018 Winners	Kim Na-ni & Jeong Seok-soon	Does Anybody Know This Person? (누가 이 사람을 모르시나요) & Simcheongga (심청가)	Kim Na-ni & Jeong Seok-soon (428)
360	July 7, 2018	The Fantastic Duo, Singing Happiness Special (Singers & their managers)	Jeup (Imfact) & Kim Kyung-moon	Sunset Flow (붉은 노을)	Min Young-ki & Ji Woo-jin (423)
360	July 7, 2018	The Fantastic Duo, Singing Happiness Special (Singers & their managers)	Jo Young-gu & Lee Dae-ro feat. Poppin' Hyun-joon	Mona Lisa (모나리자)	Min Young-ki & Ji Woo-jin (423)
360	July 7, 2018	The Fantastic Duo, Singing Happiness Special (Singers & their managers)	Killagramz & Jo Yoon-cheol	To You (그대에게)	Min Young-ki & Ji Woo-jin (423)
360	July 7, 2018	The Fantastic Duo, Singing Happiness Special (Singers & their managers)	U Sung-eun & Choi Dong-yeol feat. Baek Ji-young	Love Rain (사랑비)	Min Young-ki & Ji Woo-jin (423)
360	July 7, 2018	The Fantastic Duo, Singing Happiness Special (Singers & their managers)	Min Young-ki & Ji Woo-jin	As I Say (말하는 대로)	Min Young-ki & Ji Woo-jin (423)
360	July 7, 2018	The Fantastic Duo, Singing Happiness Special (Singers & their managers)	Park Ki-young & Lee Yoon	Now (이제는)	Min Young-ki & Ji Woo-jin (423)
361	July 14, 2018	Kim Hyeon-cheol	Wheesung	I'm Happy (난 행복해)	The One (422)
361	July 14, 2018	Kim Hyeon-cheol	Kim Won-joo (4Men) & Ben	The Blue in You (그대 안의 블루)	The One (422)
361	July 14, 2018	Kim Hyeon-cheol	Kwak Jin-eon	One Late Night in 1994 (1994년 어느 늦은 밤)	The One (422)
361	July 14, 2018	Kim Hyeon-cheol	Monni	What's Wrong? (왜 그래)	The One (422)
361	July 14, 2018	Kim Hyeon-cheol	The One	Please (제발))	The One (422)
361	July 14, 2018	Kim Hyeon-cheol	Ko Yeong-yeol & Seunghee (Oh My Girl)	Train to Chuncheon (춘천 가는 기차)	The One (422)
361	July 14, 2018	Kim Hyeon-cheol	Parc Jae-jung	For Lifetime (일생을)	The One (422)
362	July 21, 2018	Choi Jin-hui	The One	Heavenly Reunion (천상재회)	Forte di Quattro (431)
362	July 21, 2018	Choi Jin-hui	Hong Kyung-min	Water Spray (물보라	Forte di Quattro (431)
362	July 21, 2018	Choi Jin-hui	Voisper	Baby Doll (꼬마인형)	Forte di Quattro (431)
362	July 21, 2018	Choi Jin-hui	Kim Yong-jin (Bohemian)	We Broke Up Too Easily (우린 너무 쉽게 헤어졌어요)	Forte di Quattro (431)
362	July 21, 2018	Choi Jin-hui	Kim Na-ni & Jeong Seok-soon	If I Am Shaken with The Wind (바람에 흔들리고 비에 젖어도)	Forte di Quattro (431)
362	July 21, 2018	Choi Jin-hui	Kei (Lovelyz)	The Maze of Love (사랑의 미로)	Forte di Quattro (431)
362	July 21, 2018	Choi Jin-hui	Forte di Quattro	Belated Regret (미련 때문에)	Forte di Quattro (431)
363	July 28, 2018	Bang Mi	Min Woo-hyuk	This Autumn I Will Love (올 가을엔 사랑을 할 거야)	Sonya (429)
363	July 28, 2018	Bang Mi	Son Seung-yeon	Don't Hesitate (주저하지 말아요)	Sonya (429)
363	July 28, 2018	Bang Mi	Imfact	False Rumour (뜬소문)	Sonya (429)
363	July 28, 2018	Bang Mi	Duetto	Love and Memories (사랑도 추억도)	Sonya (429)
363	July 28, 2018	Bang Mi	Voisper	Seasonal Changes Twice (계절이 두번 바뀌면)	Sonya (429)
363	July 28, 2018	Bang Mi	The One	One Way Ticket (나를 보러 와요)	Sonya (429)
363	July 28, 2018	Bang Mi	Sonya feat. Ha Hui-dong & Choi Soo-jin	What Women Want (여자는 무엇으로 사는가)	Sonya (429)
364	August 4, 2018	Kim Won-jun	ONF	In the Dead of the Night (모든 잠든 후에)	Hoya (429)
364	August 4, 2018	Kim Won-jun	Voisper	Short Promise (짧은 다짐)	Hoya (429)
364	August 4, 2018	Kim Won-jun	Seo In-young	Show	Hoya (429)
364	August 4, 2018	Kim Won-jun	Min Woo-hyuk	The World is to Me (세상은 나에게)	Hoya (429)
364	August 4, 2018	Kim Won-jun	South Club	While You're Not Here (너 없는 동안)	Hoya (429)
364	August 4, 2018	Kim Won-jun	Monni	Always (언제나	Hoya (429)
364	August 4, 2018	Kim Won-jun	Hoya	You're Mine (넌 내꺼	Hoya (429)
365	August 11, 2018	2018 Hot Summer with Cool Friends Special	Park Jin-joo & Kim Ri	Only That is My World (그것만이 내 세상)	Jeong Yeong-joo & Lee Jeong-yeol (417)
365	August 11, 2018	2018 Hot Summer with Cool Friends Special	Seo Kyung-seok & Lee Yoon-seok	Friend (친구여)	Jeong Yeong-joo & Lee Jeong-yeol (417)
365	August 11, 2018	2018 Hot Summer with Cool Friends Special	Hwang Seok-jeong & Jannabi	Dream (꿈)	Jeong Yeong-joo & Lee Jeong-yeol (417)
365	August 11, 2018	2018 Hot Summer with Cool Friends Special	Outsider & Jang Moon-bok feat. Seong Hyun-woo	As I Told You (말하자면	Jeong Yeong-joo & Lee Jeong-yeol (417)
365	August 11, 2018	2018 Hot Summer with Cool Friends Special	Jeong Yeong-joo & Lee Jeong-yeol	You're Far Away (님은 먼 곳에	Jeong Yeong-joo & Lee Jeong-yeol (417)
365	August 11, 2018	2018 Hot Summer with Cool Friends Special	Tae Jin-ah & Kangnam	Wind, Wind, Wind (바람 바람 바람)	Jeong Yeong-joo & Lee Jeong-yeol (417)
366	August 18, 2018	Gayo Stage Special	Forestella	The Moonlight in Shilla (신라의 달밤)	Ali (424)
366	August 18, 2018	Gayo Stage Special	The One feat. Nam Joo-hui	Love that Left Autumn (가을을 남기고 간 사랑)	Ali (424)
366	August 18, 2018	Gayo Stage Special	Baek A-yeon	You Are Crying (당신도 울고 있네요)	Ali (424)
366	August 18, 2018	Gayo Stage Special	Son Seung-yeon	Wild Rose (찔레꽃)	Ali (424)
366	August 18, 2018	Gayo Stage Special	The Brothers	A Wanderer's Sorrow (나그네)	Ali (424)
366	August 18, 2018	Gayo Stage Special	Ali	A Man in a Yellow Shirt (노란 셔츠의 사나이)	Ali (424)
367	August 25, 2018	Gayo Stage Special	Rose Motel	Spring Days Flit Through My Mind (봄날은 간다)	Min Woo-hyuk (426)
367	August 25, 2018	Gayo Stage Special	Melody Day	Parting at Busan (이별의 부산 정거장)	Min Woo-hyuk (426)
367	August 25, 2018	Gayo Stage Special	Seo Ji-an & Seo Je-i	I Come Back to Samgakji (돌아가는 삼각지)	Min Woo-hyuk (426)
367	August 25, 2018	Gayo Stage Special	Min Woo-hyuk	Parents (부모) & 어매)	Min Woo-hyuk (426)
367	August 25, 2018	Gayo Stage Special	Song So-hee	Tearful Duman River (눈물 젖은 두만강)	Min Woo-hyuk (426)
367	August 25, 2018	Gayo Stage Special	Hwang Chi-yeul	Faraway Hometown (머나먼 고향)	Min Woo-hyuk (426)
368	September 8, 2018	Eun-hee	Seo Young-eun	With a Flower Ring On (꽃반지 끼고)	Choi Jung-won (429)
368	September 8, 2018	Eun-hee	Kim Yong-jin (Bohemian)	Summer Wine (썸머 와인)	Choi Jung-won (429)
368	September 8, 2018	Eun-hee	Nam Hyun-joon & Park Ae-ri ft. Nam Ye-sool	Lighthouse Keeper (등대지기)	Choi Jung-won (429)
368	September 8, 2018	Eun-hee	GB9	Dream Way (꿈길)	Choi Jung-won (429)
368	September 8, 2018	Eun-hee	Jeong Se-woon	Sans Toi Ma Mie (쌍 뚜아 마미)	Choi Jung-won (429)
368	September 8, 2018	Eun-hee	Choi Jung-won	I Love You (사랑해)	Choi Jung-won (429)
369	September 15, 2018	YB	Parc Jae-jung	It Must Have Been Love (사랑했나봐)	Jung Dong-ha (425)
369	September 15, 2018	YB	Ken (VIXX)	Since I Let You Go (너를 보내고)	Jung Dong-ha (425)
369	September 15, 2018	YB	Romantic Punch	Peppermint Candy (박하사탕)	Jung Dong-ha (425)
369	September 15, 2018	YB	Jung Dong-ha	Love Two (사랑 two)	Jung Dong-ha (425)
369	September 15, 2018	YB	Monni	Forget You (잊을게)	Jung Dong-ha (425)
369	September 15, 2018	YB	Ali	A Flying Butterfly (나는 나비)	Jung Dong-ha (425)
370	September 22, 2018	2018 Chuseok Special	Kim Young-hee & Kwon In-sook	Affection (애모)	Bong-gu & Kim Seong-sook (427)
370	September 22, 2018	2018 Chuseok Special	Han Hyun-min & his family	No Matter What (무조건)	Bong-gu & Kim Seong-sook (427)
370	September 22, 2018	2018 Chuseok Special	Nam Bo-won & Jo Kil-ja	Broken Clock (고장난 벽시계)	Bong-gu & Kim Seong-sook (427)
370	September 22, 2018	2018 Chuseok Special	Shim Mina & Ryu Phillip	Joy (환희)	Bong-gu & Kim Seong-sook (427)
370	September 22, 2018	2018 Chuseok Special	Hong Hye-geol & Yeo Esther	Rose (장미)	Bong-gu & Kim Seong-sook (427)
370	September 22, 2018	2018 Chuseok Special	Bong-gu & Kim Seong-sook	Oh, Love (사랑으로)	Bong-gu & Kim Seong-sook (427)
371	September 29, 2018	Bunny Girls	The One	Old Story (옛날이야기)	South Club (393)
371	September 29, 2018	Bunny Girls	Hong Kyung-min	I Can't Go Like This (그냥 갈 수 없잖아)	South Club (393)
371	September 29, 2018	Bunny Girls	DIA	He Doesn't Miss Me (보고 싶지도 않은가 봐)	South Club (393)
371	September 29, 2018	Bunny Girls	Geum Jan-di	Take Him There (그 사람 데려다 주오)	South Club (393)
371	September 29, 2018	Bunny Girls	Kim Na-ni	Black Rose (검은 장미)	South Club (393)
371	September 29, 2018	Bunny Girls	South Club	Waves (파도)	South Club (393)
372	October 6, 2018	Korean Lyric Awards Special	Pentagon	The Pierrot Smiles At Us (삐에로는 우릴 보고 웃지)	Youngji (424)
372	October 6, 2018	Korean Lyric Awards Special	Jung Dong-ha	The Melancholy Of Love (사랑 그 쓸쓸함에 대하여)	Youngji (424)
372	October 6, 2018	Korean Lyric Awards Special	Yoo Tae-pyeong-yang	Beautiful Country (아름다운 강산)	Youngji (424)
372	October 6, 2018	Korean Lyric Awards Special	Cold Cherry	Green Day (푸르른 날)	Youngji (424)
372	October 6, 2018	Korean Lyric Awards Special	Park Ki-young	The Wind Blows (바람이 분다)	Youngji (424)
372	October 6, 2018	Korean Lyric Awards Special	Youngji (Bubble Sisters)	Binari (비나리)	Youngji (424)
373	October 13, 2018	Korean Lyric Awards Special	South Club	Forgotten Season (잊혀진 계절)	Forestella (429)
373	October 13, 2018	Korean Lyric Awards Special	KCM	Where You Are Stepping At (그대 발길 머무는 곳에)	Forestella (429)
373	October 13, 2018	Korean Lyric Awards Special	Lee Se-joon (Yurisangja)	Rain on the Window (유리창엔 비)	Forestella (429)
373	October 13, 2018	Korean Lyric Awards Special	Forestella	Arirang All Alone (홀로 아리랑)	Forestella (429)
373	October 13, 2018	Korean Lyric Awards Special	Paran	That's It (타타타)	Forestella (429)
373	October 13, 2018	Korean Lyric Awards Special	Kim Yong-jin (Bohemian)	A Plantain (파초)	Forestella (429)
374	October 20, 2018	The Late Kim Joong-soon Special	Youngji (Bubble Sisters)	Please Let Me Forget (잊게 해 주오)	Monni (431)
374	October 20, 2018	The Late Kim Joong-soon Special	Kim So-hyun & Son Jun-ho	I Truly Didn't Know (진정 난 몰랐네)	Monni (431)
374	October 20, 2018	The Late Kim Joong-soon Special	Duetto	Lost Love (잃어버린 정)	Monni (431)
374	October 20, 2018	The Late Kim Joong-soon Special	Hong Kyung-min	Did I Come to Cry? (울려고 내가 왔나)	Monni (431)
374	October 20, 2018	The Late Kim Joong-soon Special	Romantic Punch	Busan Seagulls (부산 갈매기)	Monni (431)
374	October 20, 2018	The Late Kim Joong-soon Special	Monni	Rainwater (빗물)	Monni (431)
375	October 27, 2018	Yoon Bok-hee	Seo Jian	Why Look Back (왜 돌아보오)	Monni (435)
375	October 27, 2018	Yoon Bok-hee	Tae Pyung Yang & Kim Jun Su & Go Young Yeol	Life (삶)	Monni (435)
375	October 27, 2018	Yoon Bok-hee	Yang Dong-geun & Heritage	Place of Singing (노래하는 곳에)	Monni (435)
375	October 27, 2018	Yoon Bok-hee	Park Ki Young	Wanderer (나그네)	Monni (435)
375	October 27, 2018	Yoon Bok-hee	Paul Potts & Bae Da Hae	Everyone (여러분)	Monni (435)
375	October 27, 2018	Yoon Bok-hee	Monni	Gethsemane	Monni (435)
376	November 3, 2018	KBS Top10 Songs	Monni	The Face I Miss (Min Hae Kyung) (보고싶은 얼굴 (민해경))	BEN (422)
376	November 3, 2018	KBS Top10 Songs	Lee Se Joon	Heaven (Kim Hak Rae) (하늘이여 (김학래))	BEN (422)
376	November 3, 2018	KBS Top10 Songs	Dreamcatcher (group)	To DJ (Yoon Si Nae) (DJ에게 (윤시내))	BEN (422)
376	November 3, 2018	KBS Top10 Songs	South Club	As Time Goes By (Choi Ho Sub) (세월이 가면 (최호섭))	BEN (422)
376	November 3, 2018	KBS Top10 Songs	V.O.S	For a Long Time After That (Shin Seung Hun) (그 후로 오랫동안 (신승훈))	BEN (422)
376	November 3, 2018	KBS Top10 Songs	BEN	Marry Me (Im Chang Jung) (결혼해줘 (임창정))	BEN (422)
377	November 10, 2018	Choi Yang Sook	Kim Yong Jin	Twilight Elegy (황혼의 엘레지)	Forestella (432)
377	November 10, 2018	Choi Yang Sook	Jeong Se-woon	I Will Wait (기다리겠어요)	Forestella (432)
377	November 10, 2018	Choi Yang Sook	Youngji	The One I Met by the River (호반에서 만난 사람)	Forestella (432)
377	November 10, 2018	Choi Yang Sook	BEN & Ha Eun	Autumn Letter (가을 편지)	Forestella (432)
377	November 10, 2018	Choi Yang Sook	Musical "1446" team	It Snows (눈이 내리네)	Forestella (432)
377	November 10, 2018	Choi Yang Sook	Forestella	Footprints in the Sand (모래 위의 발자욱)	Forestella (432)
378	November 24, 2018	Lookalike Celebrity Special	Lee Chul Min & Cho Yoon Ho	Seoshi (Shin Sung Woo) (서시 (신성우))	An Seok Hwan & KCM (410)
378	November 24, 2018	Lookalike Celebrity Special	Lee Hye Jung & Hong Yun Hwa	Unpredictable Life (Lee Moon-se)(알 수 없는 인생 (이문세))	An Seok Hwan & KCM (410)
378	November 24, 2018	Lookalike Celebrity Special	Nam Sang Il & Park Gu Yoon	Nest (Nam Jin) (둥지 (남진))	An Seok Hwan & KCM (410)
378	November 24, 2018	Lookalike Celebrity Special	An Seok Hwan & KCM	Lie on the Sea (The Treble Clef) (바다에 누워 (높은음자리))	An Seok Hwan & KCM (410)
378	November 24, 2018	Lookalike Celebrity Special	Bae Young Man & Han Min Gwan	Because I Am A Man (Cho Hang Jo) (남자라는 이유로 (조항조))	An Seok Hwan & KCM (410)
378	November 24, 2018	Lookalike Celebrity Special	Sleepy & Son Hun SU	Night After Night (In Soon I) (밤이면 밤마다 (인순이))	An Seok Hwan & KCM (410)
379	December 1, 2018	Kim Hyun Sik & Yoo Jae Ha	South Club	Because I Love You (Yoo Jae Ha) (사랑하기 때문에 (유재하))	Ha Dong-kyun (424)
379	December 1, 2018	Kim Hyun Sik & Yoo Jae Ha	Monni	Making Memories (Kim Hyun Sik) (추억 만들기 (김현식))	Ha Dong-kyun (424)
379	December 1, 2018	Kim Hyun Sik & Yoo Jae Ha	Ailee	My Love By My Side (Kim Hyun Sik) (내 사랑 내 곁에 (김현식))	Ha Dong-kyun (424)
379	December 1, 2018	Kim Hyun Sik & Yoo Jae Ha	Kim Na Ni & Jung Seok Soon	With You Forever (Lee Moon Sae & Yoo Jae Ha) (그대와 영원히 (이문세))	Ha Dong-kyun (424)
379	December 1, 2018	Kim Hyun Sik & Yoo Jae Ha	Ha Dong-kyun	Like Rain and Music (Kim Hyun Sik) (비처럼 음악처럼 (김현식))	Ha Dong-kyun (424)
379	December 1, 2018	Kim Hyun Sik & Yoo Jae Ha	Vromance	I Loved You (Kim Hyun Sik) (사랑했어요 (김현식))	Ha Dong-kyun (424)
380	December 8, 2018	Kim Hyun Sik & Yoo Jae Ha	Kim Yeon Ji	Hidden Road (Kim Hyun Sik & Yoo Jae Ha) (가리워진 길 (유재하/김현식))	Im Tae-kyung (431)
380	December 8, 2018	Kim Hyun Sik & Yoo Jae Ha	Lyn	Love Love Love (Kim Hyun Sik) (사랑 사랑 사랑 (김현식))	Im Tae-kyung (431)
380	December 8, 2018	Kim Hyun Sik & Yoo Jae Ha	Wheesung	Alleyway (Shinchon Blues) (골목길 (신촌블루스))	Im Tae-kyung (431)
380	December 8, 2018	Kim Hyun Sik & Yoo Jae Ha	JK Kim Dong Uk	Always You Are by My Side (Kim Hyun Sik) (언제나 그대 내 곁에 (김현식))	Im Tae-kyung (431)
380	December 8, 2018	Kim Hyun Sik & Yoo Jae Ha	Jukjae	Past Days (Yoo Jae Ha) (지난 날 (유재하))	Im Tae-kyung (431)
380	December 8, 2018	Kim Hyun Sik & Yoo Jae Ha	Im Tae-kyung	You in My Arms (Yoo Jae Ha) (그대 내 품에 (유재하))	Im Tae-kyung (431)
381	December 15, 2018	Kim Sang Hee	Monni	True Love (참사랑)	Romantic Punch (429)
381	December 15, 2018	Kim Sang Hee	Matilda	Ulsan Big Baby (울산 큰 애기)	Romantic Punch (429)
381	December 15, 2018	Kim Sang Hee	Im Tae-kyung	Bright Moon of the 15th Night (삼오야 밝은 달)	Romantic Punch (429)
381	December 15, 2018	Kim Sang Hee	Nam Hyun-joon & Park Ae-ri	Road with Cosmos Flowers (코스모스 피어 있는 길)	Romantic Punch (429)
381	December 15, 2018	Kim Sang Hee	Kim Yeon Ji	One Suit Gentleman (단벌 신사)	Romantic Punch (429)
381	December 15, 2018	Kim Sang Hee	Romantic Punch	Gyeongsang Youth (경상도 청년)	Romantic Punch (429)
382	December 22, 2018	2018 King of Kings Special	Forte di Quattro	Turning the Pages of Memories (Lee Sun Hee) (추억의 책장을 넘기면 (이선희))	Kim Yong Jin (434)
382	December 22, 2018	2018 King of Kings Special	BEN	Beautiful Goodbye (Kim Gun Mo) (아름다운 이별 (김건모))	Kim Yong Jin (434)
382	December 22, 2018	2018 King of Kings Special	Kim Kyung-ho	I Swear (Jo Sung Mo) (다짐 (조성모))	Kim Yong Jin (434)
382	December 22, 2018	2018 King of Kings Special	Min Woo Hyuk	Pine Tree, Pine Tree, Green Pine Tree (An Chi Hwan) + Do You Hear the People Sing (Les Misérables) (솔아 솔아 푸르른 솔아 (안치환) +민중의 노래(뮤지컬 “레미제라블”))	Kim Yong Jin (434)
382	December 22, 2018	2018 King of Kings Special	The One	Lived Like A Fool (Kim Do Hyang) (바보처럼 살았군요 (김도향))	Kim Yong Jin (434)
382	December 22, 2018	2018 King of Kings Special	Kim Yong Jin	Those Days (Kim Kwang Seok) (그 날들 (김광석))	Kim Yong Jin (434)
383	December 29, 2018	2018 King of Kings Special	Park Ki Young	Only That Is My World (Deulgukhwa) (그것만이 내 세상 (들국화)))	Romantic Punch (440)
383	December 29, 2018	2018 King of Kings Special	Monni	Jasmine (Lee Seung Chul) (말리꽃 (이승철))	Romantic Punch (440)
383	December 29, 2018	2018 King of Kings Special	Ali	Mona Lisa (Cho Young Pil) (모나리자 (조용필))	Romantic Punch (440)
383	December 29, 2018	2018 King of Kings Special	Forestella	Magic Castle (The Classic) (마법의 성 (더 클래식))	Romantic Punch (440)
383	December 29, 2018	2018 King of Kings Special	Jung Dong Ha	The Victory (Koreana) (The Victory (코리아나))	Romantic Punch (440)
383	December 29, 2018	2018 King of Kings Special	Romantic Punch	We Are The Champions (Queen)	Romantic Punch (440)

=== 2019 ===
List of episodes aired in 2019

Singers listed in order of performance.

Episode #	Broadcast Date	Legend or Theme	Guest Singers	Songs	Final Winner (Votes)
384	January 5, 2019	New Year Special	Yoo Tae Pyung Yang & Saengdonggam Crew	Get Up (Kim Kwang Seok) (일어나 (김광석))	Hoya (429)
384	January 5, 2019	New Year Special	Lee Man Gi & Hong Kyung Min	White Butterfly (Kim Jung Ho) (하얀 나비 (김정호))	Hoya (429)
384	January 5, 2019	New Year Special	Kim Dong Gyu & Son Jun Ho	You will never walk alone & Gipsy Kings-Volare (Carousel)	Hoya (429)
384	January 5, 2019	New Year Special	Kim Kyung Rok & Park Jae Jung & Gilgu	I Wish Now It Will Be That (Cho Young Pil) (이젠 그랬으면 좋겠네 (조용필))	Hoya (429)
384	January 5, 2019	New Year Special	Suh Young Eun	I Dream (꿈을 꾼다)	Hoya (429)
384	January 5, 2019	New Year Special	Hoya	Snow Flower (Park Hyo Shin) (눈의 꽃 (박효신))	Hoya (429)
385	January 12, 2019	SSAW	Sunwoo Jung A	A Diary of 10 Years Ago (10년 전의 일기를 꺼내어)	JK Kim Dong-wook & Monni (420)
385	January 12, 2019	SSAW	Jung Dong Ha	People Must All Change (사람들은 모두 변하나 봐)	JK Kim Dong-wook & Monni (420)
385	January 12, 2019	SSAW	Monni	Always Winter (언제나 겨울)	JK Kim Dong-wook & Monni (420)
385	January 12, 2019	SSAW	Moon Si On	Someone's Dream (어떤 이의 꿈)	JK Kim Dong-wook & Monni (420)
385	January 12, 2019	SSAW	Hong Kyung Min	Spring Summer Autumn Winter (봄 여름 가을 겨울)	JK Kim Dong-wook & Monni (420)
385	January 12, 2019	SSAW	JK Kim Dong-wook	Bravo, My Life	JK Kim Dong-wook & Monni (420)
386	January 19, 2019	Composer Song Mog In	Kim So Hyun & Song Jun Ho	Tears of Mokpo (Lee Nan Young) (목포의 눈물 (이난영))	Kim Joon Su & Yoon Tae Pyung Yang & Ko Young Yeol (419)
386	January 19, 2019	Composer Song Mog In	Romantic Punch	Dad's Youth (Oh Gi Taek) (아빠의 청춘 (오기택))	Kim Joon Su & Yoon Tae Pyung Yang & Ko Young Yeol (419)
386	January 19, 2019	Composer Song Mog In	Moon Si On	Wife's Song (Shim Yeon Ok) (아내의 노래 (심연옥))	Kim Joon Su & Yoon Tae Pyung Yang & Ko Young Yeol (419)
386	January 19, 2019	Composer Song Mog In	Park Ki Young	Song of a Seabird (Lee Nan Young) (해조곡 (이난영))	Kim Joon Su & Yoon Tae Pyung Yang & Ko Young Yeol (419)
386	January 19, 2019	Composer Song Mog In	Koh Yu Jin & Ryan	Symphonic Poem of the Sea (Kim Jung Gu) (바다의 교향시 (김정구))	Kim Joon Su & Yoon Tae Pyung Yang & Ko Young Yeol (419)
386	January 19, 2019	Composer Song Mog In	Kim Joon Su & Yoon Tae Pyung Yang & Ko Young Yeol	Life Away From Home (Ko Bok Su) (타향살이 (고복수))	Kim Joon Su & Yoon Tae Pyung Yang & Ko Young Yeol (419)
387	January 26, 2019	Lee Kwang Cho	Nam Hyun-joon & Park Ae-ri	A Joyful Life (즐거운 인생)	Yurisangja (432)
387	January 26, 2019	Lee Kwang Cho	NC.A	Too Far to Be Close to You (가까이하기엔 너무 먼 당신)	Yurisangja (432)
387	January 26, 2019	Lee Kwang Cho	Hwang Chi-yeul	When Time Passes (세월 가면)	Yurisangja (432)
387	January 26, 2019	Lee Kwang Cho	Ha Eun	Oh You Are a Beautiful Woman (오 그대는 아름다운 여인)	Yurisangja (432)
387	January 26, 2019	Lee Kwang Cho	Monni	On a Night Like Tonight (오늘 같은 밤)	Yurisangja (432)
387	January 26, 2019	Lee Kwang Cho	Yurisangja	I Lost My Love (사랑을 잃어버린 나)	Yurisangja (432)
388	February 2, 2019	Lunar New Year Special	Kim Seung Hyun's Family	Embrace (Noh Sa Yeon) & Companion (Tae Jin A) (만남 (노사연) & 동반자 (태진아))	Kim Bong Gon & Kim Do Hyun & Kim Da Hyun (427)
388	February 2, 2019	Lunar New Year Special	Monni's Kim Shin Ui & Kim Hyung Jae	Now (Jo Young Nam) (지금 (조영남))	Kim Bong Gon & Kim Do Hyun & Kim Da Hyun (427)
388	February 2, 2019	Lunar New Year Special	Sung Byeong Suk & Seo Song Hee	Name Tag of Love (Hyeon Cheol) (사랑의 이름표 (현철))	Kim Bong Gon & Kim Do Hyun & Kim Da Hyun (427)
388	February 2, 2019	Lunar New Year Special	Kim Bong Gon & Kim Do Hyun & Kim Da Hyun	Pansori Chunhyang Love Song & Rhododendron (Maya) (판소리 춘향가 사랑가 & 진달래꽃 (마야))	Kim Bong Gon & Kim Do Hyun & Kim Da Hyun (427)
388	February 2, 2019	Lunar New Year Special	Yoo Hye Ri & Choi Su Rin	I Will Show You (Ailee) (보여줄게 (에일리))	Kim Bong Gon & Kim Do Hyun & Kim Da Hyun (427)
388	February 2, 2019	Lunar New Year Special	Hong Hyun Hee & Jason	Eve's Warning (Park Mi Kyung) (이브의 경고 (박미경))	Kim Bong Gon & Kim Do Hyun & Kim Da Hyun (427)
389	February 9, 2019	Lee Jang Hee	Yuk Joong Wan Band	I Can't Tell You (애기할 수 없어요)	Tei (418)
389	February 9, 2019	Lee Jang Hee	Min Woo Hyuk & Son Jun Ho	Goodbye Sadness (슬픔이여 안녕)	Tei (418)
389	February 9, 2019	Lee Jang Hee	Astro	Rose (장미)	Tei (418)
389	February 9, 2019	Lee Jang Hee	Ha Eun	I Will Give You Everything (나 그대에게 모두 드리리)	Tei (418)
389	February 9, 2019	Lee Jang Hee	Tei	Goodbye (Kim tae Hwa) (안녕 (김태화))	Tei (418)
390	February 16, 2019	Lee Jang Hee	Kim Yeon Ji	Whistle (Jang Mi Soo) (휘파람을 부세요 (정미조)))	Forestella (429)
390	February 16, 2019	Lee Jang Hee	Yoo Tae Pyung Yang & Ko Young Yeol & Kim Joon Su	That's You (그건 너)	Forestella (429)
390	February 16, 2019	Lee Jang Hee	NC.A	Too Lonely To Dance Alone (Kim Wan Sun) (나 홀로 춤을 추긴 너무 외로워 (김완선))	Forestella (429)
390	February 16, 2019	Lee Jang Hee	Kim Kyung-ho	It's Been A Long Time (한동안 뜸했었지)	Forestella (429)
390	February 16, 2019	Lee Jang Hee	Forestella	Who Cares When I Like It (Kim Se Hwan) (좋은 걸 어떡해 (김세환))	Forestella (429)
390	February 16, 2019	Lee Jang Hee	Monni	Let's Forget It (Kim Wan Sun) (이젠 잊기로 해요 (김완선))	Forestella (429)
391	February 23, 2019	Queen	Forestella	Bohemian Rhapsody	Seomoon Tak (439)
391	February 23, 2019	Queen	Ha Eun	Love Of My Life	Seomoon Tak (439)
391	February 23, 2019	Queen	Nam Tae-hyun	Somebody to love	Seomoon Tak (439)
391	February 23, 2019	Queen	Son Seung Yeon	We Are The Champions	Seomoon Tak (439)
391	February 23, 2019	Queen	Seomoon Tak	I Was Born To Love You	Seomoon Tak (439)
391	February 23, 2019	Queen	Kim Jong-seo	Don't Stop Me Now	Seomoon Tak (439)
392	March 2, 2019	Singing 100 Years of Korea with People	SF9 (band)	Ah! Republic of Korea	Jung Dong-ha ft. Min Young Ki (426)
392	March 2, 2019	Singing 100 Years of Korea with People	Yoon Chung Il & Kim Joon Su	The Old Site of Ruined Castel & The Beggar's Song	Jung Dong-ha ft. Min Young Ki (426)
392	March 2, 2019	Singing 100 Years of Korea with People	Seo Ji An	Evergreen Tree	Jung Dong-ha ft. Min Young Ki (426)
392	March 2, 2019	Singing 100 Years of Korea with People	Jung Dong-ha ft. Min Young Ki	Beautiful Country	Jung Dong-ha ft. Min Young Ki (426)
392	March 2, 2019	Singing 100 Years of Korea with People	JK Kim Dong-wook	Spring Days Flit Through My Mind	Jung Dong-ha ft. Min Young Ki (426)
392	March 2, 2019	Singing 100 Years of Korea with People	Monni	Morning Dew	Jung Dong-ha ft. Min Young Ki (426)
393	March 9, 2019	Singing 100 Years of Korea with People	Yuk Joong Wan Band	As I Live	Ha Eun (425)
393	March 9, 2019	Singing 100 Years of Korea with People	Park Ki Young	Champions	Ha Eun (425)
393	March 9, 2019	Singing 100 Years of Korea with People	Min Woo Hyuk	Does Anyone Know This Person?	Ha Eun (425)
393	March 9, 2019	Singing 100 Years of Korea with People	Ha Eun	Raining Gomoryeong	Ha Eun (425)
393	March 9, 2019	Singing 100 Years of Korea with People	Dream Note	Faraway Hometown	Ha Eun (425)
393	March 9, 2019	Singing 100 Years of Korea with People	Ali & Oh Jung Hae	Arirang	Ha Eun (425)
394	March 16, 2019	Jo Sung Mo	Na Yoon Kwon	For Your Soul	Kim Yeon Ji (421)
394	March 16, 2019	Jo Sung Mo	ONF	I Swear	Kim Yeon Ji (421)
394	March 16, 2019	Jo Sung Mo	GB9	Do You Know	Kim Yeon Ji (421)
394	March 16, 2019	Jo Sung Mo	Kim Yeon Ji	A Thorn Tree	Kim Yeon Ji (421)
394	March 16, 2019	Jo Sung Mo	Romantic Punch	Immortal Love	Kim Yeon Ji (421)
394	March 16, 2019	Jo Sung Mo	Ha Eun	To Heaven	Kim Yeon Ji (421)
395	March 23, 2019	Kim Byeong Geol	Yuk Joong Wan Band	At Andong Station	Hong Kyung-min & Samuel (431)
395	March 23, 2019	Kim Byeong Geol	fromis 9	All Together Cha Cha Cha	Hong Kyung-min & Samuel (431)
395	March 23, 2019	Kim Byeong Geol	Monni	Tears of a Man	Hong Kyung-min & Samuel (431)
395	March 23, 2019	Kim Byeong Geol	Hong Kyung-min & Samuel	Chan Chan Chan	Hong Kyung-min & Samuel (431)
395	March 23, 2019	Kim Byeong Geol	Kim Bo Hyung	The Southern Man, the Northern Woman	Hong Kyung-min & Samuel (431)
395	March 23, 2019	Kim Byeong Geol	Kim Yong Jin	City Pierrot	Hong Kyung-min & Samuel (431)
396	March 30, 2019	Cheong Tae Choon & Park Eun Ohk	Jatanpung	Poet's the Village	Song So-hee (432)
396	March 30, 2019	Cheong Tae Choon & Park Eun Ohk	Jang Beom June	Candlelight	Song So-hee (432)
396	March 30, 2019	Cheong Tae Choon & Park Eun Ohk	Ali	92 The Rainy Spell, in Jongno	Song So-hee (432)
396	March 30, 2019	Cheong Tae Choon & Park Eun Ohk	Im Tae Kyung ft. Yoon Young Seok	The Leaving Ship	Song So-hee (432)
396	March 30, 2019	Cheong Tae Choon & Park Eun Ohk	Seo J	To You, My Love	Song So-hee (432)
396	March 30, 2019	Cheong Tae Choon & Park Eun Ohk	Monni	Reminiscence	Song So-hee (432)
396	March 30, 2019	Cheong Tae Choon & Park Eun Ohk	Song So-hee	Garden Balsam	Song So-hee (432)
397	April 6, 2019	Lee Ho Jun	Nam Tae-hyun	Where Your Steps Linger	Son Seung-yeon (434)
397	April 6, 2019	Lee Ho Jun	Park Si-hwan	You Outside the Door	Son Seung-yeon (434)
397	April 6, 2019	Lee Ho Jun	Dreamcatcher	Like an Indian Doll	Son Seung-yeon (434)
397	April 6, 2019	Lee Ho Jun	Yuk Joong Wan Band	Last Night Story	Son Seung-yeon (434)
397	April 6, 2019	Lee Ho Jun	Kim Yong Jin ft. MIGYO	When it Rains on Tuesday	Son Seung-yeon (434)
397	April 6, 2019	Lee Ho Jun	Son Seung-yeon	Saturday Night Fever	Son Seung-yeon (434)
398	April 13, 2019	Melodies of Love that Touch Your Heart	Kim So Hyun & Son Jun Ho	Promise for a Hundred Years	Lee Se Joon (420)
398	April 13, 2019	Melodies of Love that Touch Your Heart	Ladies' Code	Miniskirt	Lee Se Joon (420)
398	April 13, 2019	Melodies of Love that Touch Your Heart	Lee Chang Min	Amor	Lee Se Joon (420)
398	April 13, 2019	Melodies of Love that Touch Your Heart	Nam Tae-hyun	Wish	Lee Se Joon (420)
398	April 13, 2019	Melodies of Love that Touch Your Heart	Jannabi	For Love	Lee Se Joon (420)
398	April 13, 2019	Melodies of Love that Touch Your Heart	Lee Se Joon	Reason Why I Live	Lee Se Joon (420)
399	April 20, 2019	The Global Special Part 1 ( Kim Yeon Ja Special )	Ben	Mercury Lamp	Ben (723)
399	April 20, 2019	The Global Special Part 1 ( Kim Yeon Ja Special )	Pentagon	Nation of Morning	Ben (723)
399	April 20, 2019	The Global Special Part 1 ( Kim Yeon Ja Special )	Min Woo Hyuk	Within 10 Minutes	Ben (723)
399	April 20, 2019	The Global Special Part 1 ( Kim Yeon Ja Special )	Jung Dong-ha	Don't Look Sad	Ben (723)
399	April 20, 2019	The Global Special Part 1 ( Kim Yeon Ja Special )	Iz One	Amor Fati	Ben (723)
399	April 20, 2019	The Global Special Part 1 ( Kim Yeon Ja Special )	Son Seung-yeon	Is It For Real?	Ben (723)
400	April 27, 2019	The Global Special Part 2 ( Japanese People Favorite K-POP Song )	Gummy	Come Back to Busan Port	Kim Jae-hwan (741)
400	April 27, 2019	The Global Special Part 2 ( Japanese People Favorite K-POP Song )	JBJ95	Mirotic	Kim Jae-hwan (741)
400	April 27, 2019	The Global Special Part 2 ( Japanese People Favorite K-POP Song )	Jung Dong-ha	From the Beginning Until Now	Kim Jae-hwan (741)
400	April 27, 2019	The Global Special Part 2 ( Japanese People Favorite K-POP Song )	Kim Jae-hwan	I Believe	Kim Jae-hwan (741)
400	April 27, 2019	The Global Special Part 2 ( Japanese People Favorite K-POP Song )	Ali	Snow Flower	Kim Jae-hwan (741)
400	April 27, 2019	The Global Special Part 2 ( Japanese People Favorite K-POP Song )	NCT Dream	No.1	Kim Jae-hwan (741)
401	May 4, 2019	The Stars' Great Challenge Singing Surprises	Hong Jin-young	Bruise	Park Hyun-bin (417)
401	May 4, 2019	The Stars' Great Challenge Singing Surprises	Park Gu-Yun	The Flight	Park Hyun-bin (417)
401	May 4, 2019	The Stars' Great Challenge Singing Surprises	Park Hyun-bin	"Caruso" & "With Love"	Park Hyun-bin (417)
401	May 4, 2019	The Stars' Great Challenge Singing Surprises	Yu Jina	"Five Hundred Years" & "Song of Flower"	Park Hyun-bin (417)
401	May 4, 2019	The Stars' Great Challenge Singing Surprises	Sul Woon-Do	Love	Park Hyun-bin (417)
401	May 4, 2019	The Stars' Great Challenge Singing Surprises	Cho Hang Jo	Song for You	Park Hyun-bin (417)
402	May 11, 2019	Han Dong Jun and Yurisangja	Monni	Pledge of Love	SBSB (423)
402	May 11, 2019	Han Dong Jun and Yurisangja	N.Flying	Just Knowing That You're in This World	SBSB (423)
402	May 11, 2019	Han Dong Jun and Yurisangja	Song So-hee & Son Tae Jin	Only You	SBSB (423)
402	May 11, 2019	Han Dong Jun and Yurisangja	Chungha & Kim Jae-hwan	May I Love You?	SBSB (423)
402	May 11, 2019	Han Dong Jun and Yurisangja	The Brothers	To My Bride	SBSB (423)
402	May 11, 2019	Han Dong Jun and Yurisangja	SBSB (Sweet Sorrow & The Barberettes)	I Love You	SBSB (423)
403	May 18, 2019	Kang San-ae	Kim Yong Jin	You Can Do It	Seomoon Tak (432)
403	May 18, 2019	Kang San-ae	Crying Nut	Crooked	Seomoon Tak (432)
403	May 18, 2019	Kang San-ae	Park Si-hwan	Said	Seomoon Tak (432)
403	May 18, 2019	Kang San-ae	SBSB	Yaeleolala	Seomoon Tak (432)
403	May 18, 2019	Kang San-ae	Monni	Grandpa and Watermelon	Seomoon Tak (432)
403	May 18, 2019	Kang San-ae	Seomoon Tak	Like the Salmon Tracing Up the River	Seomoon Tak (432)
404	May 25, 2019	Ha Joong Hee	Kwak Dong Hyun	Pebble	Kim Joon Su & Yoo Tae Pyung Yang (428)
404	May 25, 2019	Ha Joong Hee	SBSB	Red Shoe Girl	Kim Joon Su & Yoo Tae Pyung Yang (428)
404	May 25, 2019	Ha Joong Hee	Tei & Kim Joo Ho	Love, Once Again	Kim Joon Su & Yoo Tae Pyung Yang (428)
404	May 25, 2019	Ha Joong Hee	Forestella	The Face I Miss	Kim Joon Su & Yoo Tae Pyung Yang (428)
404	May 25, 2019	Ha Joong Hee	Park Ki-young	Joyful Arirang	Kim Joon Su & Yoo Tae Pyung Yang (428)
404	May 25, 2019	Ha Joong Hee	Kim Joon Su & Yoo Tae Pyung Yang	Road with Cosmos Flowers	Kim Joon Su & Yoo Tae Pyung Yang (428)
405	June 1, 2019	Elton John	SBSB	Goodbye Yellow Brick Road	Romantic Punch (431)
405	June 1, 2019	Elton John	Kim Ho Young	Don't Go Breaking My Heart	Romantic Punch (431)
405	June 1, 2019	Elton John	Nam Tae-hyun	Rocket Man	Romantic Punch (431)
405	June 1, 2019	Elton John	Monni	Your Song	Romantic Punch (431)
405	June 1, 2019	Elton John	Son Seung-yeon	Sorry Seems to Be the Hardest Word	Romantic Punch (431)
405	June 1, 2019	Elton John	Romantic Punch	Crocodile Rock	Romantic Punch (431)
406	June 8, 2019	Kim Hak Rai	Park Si-hwan	A Heart of Sorrow	Lee Chang Min (421)
406	June 8, 2019	Kim Hak Rai	Monni	Winter Sea	Lee Chang Min (421)
406	June 8, 2019	Kim Hak Rai	SBSB	In The Sky	Lee Chang Min (421)
406	June 8, 2019	Kim Hak Rai	DickPunks	I Don't Like Love in a Cage	Lee Chang Min (421)
406	June 8, 2019	Kim Hak Rai	Lee Chang Min	The Sun	Lee Chang Min (421)
406	June 8, 2019	Kim Hak Rai	Kim So Hyun & Son Jun Ho	I Am	Lee Chang Min (421)
407	June 15, 2019	Lee Sang-min	SBSB	3!4!	Yuk Joong Wan Band (429)
407	June 15, 2019	Lee Sang-min	Day6	Up & Down	Yuk Joong Wan Band (429)
407	June 15, 2019	Lee Sang-min	Monni	Leave	Yuk Joong Wan Band (429)
407	June 15, 2019	Lee Sang-min	Weki Meki	Come A Come	Yuk Joong Wan Band (429)
407	June 15, 2019	Lee Sang-min	Goon Jo & Kangnam	Wingless Angel	Yuk Joong Wan Band (429)
407	June 15, 2019	Lee Sang-min	Yuk Joong Wan Band	Oh Happy	Yuk Joong Wan Band (429)
408	June 22, 2019	Kim Jin Ryong	Yuk Joong Wan Band	Southbound Train	Duetto (382)
408	June 22, 2019	Kim Jin Ryong	Duetto	Life Is	Duetto (382)
408	June 22, 2019	Kim Jin Ryong	PENTAGON	Greedy Woman	Duetto (382)
408	June 22, 2019	Kim Jin Ryong	Kim Yong Jin	Buried Pain	Duetto (382)
408	June 22, 2019	Kim Jin Ryong	Kassy	Even If I Loved You	Duetto (382)
408	June 22, 2019	Kim Jin Ryong	SBSB	Lies	Duetto (382)
409	June 29, 2019	The 1st Half of 2019 Special, 7 Teams' Big Match	Jung Dong-ha	DNA	Lee Chang-min (424)
409	June 29, 2019	The 1st Half of 2019 Special, 7 Teams' Big Match	Forestella	If I Leave	Lee Chang-min (424)
409	June 29, 2019	The 1st Half of 2019 Special, 7 Teams' Big Match	Seomoon Tak	Bang Bang	Lee Chang-min (424)
409	June 29, 2019	The 1st Half of 2019 Special, 7 Teams' Big Match	Ben	Turning the Pages of Memories	Lee Chang-min (424)
409	June 29, 2019	The 1st Half of 2019 Special, 7 Teams' Big Match	Ha Eun	Invisible Love	Lee Chang-min (424)
409	June 29, 2019	The 1st Half of 2019 Special, 7 Teams' Big Match	Lee Chang-min	Weeds	Lee Chang-min (424)
409	June 29, 2019	The 1st Half of 2019 Special, 7 Teams' Big Match	Monni	Deserted Island	Lee Chang-min (424)
410	July 6, 2019	2019 Summer Special, Part 1: So Chan-whee & Kim Hyun-jung	Lee Chang-min	The Chance to Say Goodbye	Jung Yu-ji (431)
410	July 6, 2019	2019 Summer Special, Part 1: So Chan-whee & Kim Hyun-jung	Park Bom	Break Up With Her	Jung Yu-ji (431)
410	July 6, 2019	2019 Summer Special, Part 1: So Chan-whee & Kim Hyun-jung	AB6IX	Bruise	Jung Yu-ji (431)
410	July 6, 2019	2019 Summer Special, Part 1: So Chan-whee & Kim Hyun-jung	Kim Yeon-ji	Tears	Jung Yu-ji (431)
410	July 6, 2019	2019 Summer Special, Part 1: So Chan-whee & Kim Hyun-jung	DICKPUNKS	A Wise Choice	Jung Yu-ji (431)
410	July 6, 2019	2019 Summer Special, Part 1: So Chan-whee & Kim Hyun-jung	Jung Yu-ji	Lonely Love	Jung Yu-ji (431)
411	July 13, 2019	2019 Summer Special, Part 2: Glamorous Transformation of the Comedians	Trotrama (Seo Taehun, An Somi, & Kim Taewon)	Ecstatic Proposal	Kim Jun-hyun (408)
411	July 13, 2019	2019 Summer Special, Part 2: Glamorous Transformation of the Comedians	Lee Seung-yun	A Flying Butterfly	Kim Jun-hyun (408)
411	July 13, 2019	2019 Summer Special, Part 2: Glamorous Transformation of the Comedians	ONGALS	Here We Are	Kim Jun-hyun (408)
411	July 13, 2019	2019 Summer Special, Part 2: Glamorous Transformation of the Comedians	Moon Se-yoon	Old Love	Kim Jun-hyun (408)
411	July 13, 2019	2019 Summer Special, Part 2: Glamorous Transformation of the Comedians	Lee Bong-won	Because I Am a Man	Kim Jun-hyun (408)
411	July 13, 2019	2019 Summer Special, Part 2: Glamorous Transformation of the Comedians	Kim Jun-hyun	Nocturne	Kim Jun-hyun (408)
412	July 20, 2019	2019 Summer Special, Part 3: Oh My Star, Oh My Friend	KCM & Kim Kyung-hyun (The Cross)	Only That Is My World	Jang Yun-jung & Young Ji (422)
412	July 20, 2019	2019 Summer Special, Part 3: Oh My Star, Oh My Friend	Choi Jung-won & Kim Young-ju	"Super Trouper", "Thank You for the Music", & "Dancing Queen" medley	Jang Yun-jung & Young Ji (422)
412	July 20, 2019	2019 Summer Special, Part 3: Oh My Star, Oh My Friend	Kwon In-ha & Lim Jae-hyun	Like It	Jang Yun-jung & Young Ji (422)
412	July 20, 2019	2019 Summer Special, Part 3: Oh My Star, Oh My Friend	Yoo Tae Pyung Yang & Min Eun-kyung	Father	Jang Yun-jung & Young Ji (422)
412	July 20, 2019	2019 Summer Special, Part 3: Oh My Star, Oh My Friend	Jang Yun-jung & Young Ji	My Love Fades Away	Jang Yun-jung & Young Ji (422)
412	July 20, 2019	2019 Summer Special, Part 3: Oh My Star, Oh My Friend	Kim Hyun-cheol & Klang	The Blue in You	Jang Yun-jung & Young Ji (422)
413	July 27, 2019	Yoon Si-nae	Monni	I Want to Leave You	Bobby Kim (426)
413	July 27, 2019	Yoon Si-nae	Forte di Quattro	Poem of Love	Bobby Kim (426)
413	July 27, 2019	Yoon Si-nae	Lee Chang-min	To DJ	Bobby Kim (426)
413	July 27, 2019	Yoon Si-nae	Bobby Kim	Life Is	Bobby Kim (426)
413	July 27, 2019	Yoon Si-nae	Jung Yu-ji	Let's Study	Bobby Kim (426)
413	July 27, 2019	Yoon Si-nae	Park Si-hwan	Song For You	Bobby Kim (426)
414	August 3, 2019	Kim Bum-soo	Nilo	Promise	GB9 (434)
414	August 3, 2019	Kim Bum-soo	Lee Chang-min	It Will Pass	GB9 (434)
414	August 3, 2019	Kim Bum-soo	Ben & Francis	Last Love	GB9 (434)
414	August 3, 2019	Kim Bum-soo	Park Si-hwan	Appear	GB9 (434)
414	August 3, 2019	Kim Bum-soo	Solji	I Miss You	GB9 (434)
414	August 3, 2019	Kim Bum-soo	GB9	Hello, Goodbye, Hello	GB9 (434)
415	August 10, 2019	Centennial of the Korean Provisional Government Establishment: Singing the Next 100 Years	JK Kim Dong-wook	Pine Tree	Monni (436)
415	August 10, 2019	Centennial of the Korean Provisional Government Establishment: Singing the Next 100 Years	Kim So-hyun	Bird, Bird, Blue Bird	Monni (436)
415	August 10, 2019	Centennial of the Korean Provisional Government Establishment: Singing the Next 100 Years	Jung Dong-ha	Hand in Hand	Monni (436)
415	August 10, 2019	Centennial of the Korean Provisional Government Establishment: Singing the Next 100 Years	Park Si-hwan	Meeting	Monni (436)
415	August 10, 2019	Centennial of the Korean Provisional Government Establishment: Singing the Next 100 Years	Yoo Tae Pyung Yang	"Sangju Arirang" & "Aegukga"	Monni (436)
415	August 10, 2019	Centennial of the Korean Provisional Government Establishment: Singing the Next 100 Years	Monni	"Champions" & Oh "Fighting Korea"	Monni (436)
416	August 17, 2019	Lee Chi-hyun	Moon Myung-jin	Only You	HoooW & Giant Pink (434)
416	August 17, 2019	Lee Chi-hyun	Yoo Hwe-seung (N.Flying)	Sorrow of Love	HoooW & Giant Pink (434)
416	August 17, 2019	Lee Chi-hyun	Tei & Choi Jae-rim	Before It's All Gone	HoooW & Giant Pink (434)
416	August 17, 2019	Lee Chi-hyun	Park Si-hwan	You	HoooW & Giant Pink (434)
416	August 17, 2019	Lee Chi-hyun	HoooW (Son Ho-young & Kim Tae-woo) & Giant Pink	Gypsy Lady	HoooW & Giant Pink (434)
416	August 17, 2019	Lee Chi-hyun	Bobby Kim	A Night to Remember	HoooW & Giant Pink (434)
417	August 24, 2019	Choi Hee-joon	Jang Jane	Barefooted Youth	JK Kim Dong-wook (413)
417	August 24, 2019	Choi Hee-joon	Park Si-hwan	Jingogae Gentleman	JK Kim Dong-wook (413)
417	August 24, 2019	Choi Hee-joon	Yuk Joong Wan Band	My Lover is an Old Miss	JK Kim Dong-wook (413)
417	August 24, 2019	Choi Hee-joon	Kim So-hyun	"Light and Shadow" & "The Wheel of Fortune"	JK Kim Dong-wook (413)
417	August 24, 2019	Choi Hee-joon	Hong Kyung-min	The Land of Korea	JK Kim Dong-wook (413)
417	August 24, 2019	Choi Hee-joon	JK Kim Dong-wook	Lodger	JK Kim Dong-wook (413)
418	August 31, 2019	Im Chang-jung	Jung Yu-ji	You Who Resembles Me	Huh Gak (406)
418	August 31, 2019	Im Chang-jung	Son Seung-yeon	Love Affair	Huh Gak (406)
418	August 31, 2019	Im Chang-jung	Huh Gak	A Shot of Soju	Huh Gak (406)
418	August 31, 2019	Im Chang-jung	Kim Jae-hwan	Love Again	Huh Gak (406)
418	August 31, 2019	Im Chang-jung	CLC	Gone with the Wind	Huh Gak (406)
418	August 31, 2019	Im Chang-jung	Monday Kiz	Already to Me	Huh Gak (406)
419	September 7, 2019	Im Chang-jung	South Club	Again	Forestella (431)
419	September 7, 2019	Im Chang-jung	Song Ga-in	The Love I Committed	Forestella (431)
419	September 7, 2019	Im Chang-jung	Seung Guk-lee	Long Time No See	Forestella (431)
419	September 7, 2019	Im Chang-jung	Forestella	My Lover	Forestella (431)
419	September 7, 2019	Im Chang-jung	Lim Jae-hyun	Marry Me	Forestella (431)
419	September 7, 2019	Im Chang-jung	Norazo	Dances with Wolves	Forestella (431)
420	September 14, 2019	Chuseok Special, I Love My Family, I Love Music	Duetto & Yoo Him-chan	A Thousand Winds	Song Ga-in & Jo Sung-jae (419)
420	September 14, 2019	Chuseok Special, I Love My Family, I Love Music	Ham So-won & Jin Hua	Because You're My Woman	Song Ga-in & Jo Sung-jae (419)
420	September 14, 2019	Chuseok Special, I Love My Family, I Love Music	Yoo Hwe-seung (N.Flying) & Yoo Dong-gyu	Mother to Daughter	Song Ga-in & Jo Sung-jae (419)
420	September 14, 2019	Chuseok Special, I Love My Family, I Love Music	Bobby Kim & Kim Young-geun	Because I Love You	Song Ga-in & Jo Sung-jae (419)
420	September 14, 2019	Chuseok Special, I Love My Family, I Love Music	Song Ga-in & Jo Sung-jae	"Yeongam Arirang" & "Gangwon Arirang"	Song Ga-in & Jo Sung-jae (419)
420	September 14, 2019	Chuseok Special, I Love My Family, I Love Music	Lee Moo-song & Noh Sa-bong	"Amor Fati" & "Don't Go"	Song Ga-in & Jo Sung-jae (419)
421	September 21, 2019	The Melody that My Heart Remembers, We Sing of Autumn	Ben	Memory of the Wind	Jung Dong-ha (412)
421	September 21, 2019	The Melody that My Heart Remembers, We Sing of Autumn	Im Tae-kyung	Don't Be Sad	Jung Dong-ha (412)
421	September 21, 2019	The Melody that My Heart Remembers, We Sing of Autumn	Jung Dong-ha	Love Who Left Me Along the Leaves	Jung Dong-ha (412)
421	September 21, 2019	The Melody that My Heart Remembers, We Sing of Autumn	Song Ga-in	Old Hometown Station	Jung Dong-ha (412)
421	September 21, 2019	The Melody that My Heart Remembers, We Sing of Autumn	Hwang Chi-yeul	Forgotten Season	Jung Dong-ha (412)
421	September 21, 2019	The Melody that My Heart Remembers, We Sing of Autumn	Wax	Love that Left Autumn	Jung Dong-ha (412)
422	September 28, 2019	Lee Eun-mi	Hoppipolla	My Heart Beats	Lee Ji-hoon & Son Jun-ho (429)
422	September 28, 2019	Lee Eun-mi	Solji	Nocturne	Lee Ji-hoon & Son Jun-ho (429)
422	September 28, 2019	Lee Eun-mi	Lee Ji-hoon & Son Jun-ho	A Certain Longing	Lee Ji-hoon & Son Jun-ho (429)
422	September 28, 2019	Lee Eun-mi	Yoo Hwe-Seung (N.Flying)	We Are Breaking Up	Lee Ji-hoon & Son Jun-ho (429)
422	September 28, 2019	Lee Eun-mi	Park Ki-young	Into the Memory	Lee Ji-hoon & Son Jun-ho (429)
422	September 28, 2019	Lee Eun-mi	Monni	I Have a Lover	Lee Ji-hoon & Son Jun-ho (429)
423	October 5, 2019	Koyote	U Sung-eun & Giant Pink	Disturbance	Hoppipolla (417)
423	October 5, 2019	Koyote	MAMAMOO	Meeting	Hoppipolla (417)
423	October 5, 2019	Koyote	Yuk Joong Wan Band	Genuine	Hoppipolla (417)
423	October 5, 2019	Koyote	Nayoung (Gugudan) & VERIVERY (Dongheon & Yeonho)	Passion	Hoppipolla (417)
423	October 5, 2019	Koyote	(G)I-dle	Sad Dream	Hoppipolla (417)
423	October 5, 2019	Koyote	Hoppipolla	Breakup	Hoppipolla (417)
424	October 12, 2019	Baek Seol-hee	Hong Kyung-min	Passing Spring Coming Spring	Boohwal (440)
424	October 12, 2019	Baek Seol-hee	Choi Jung-won	A Hill by the River Where Waterfowls Cry	Boohwal (440)
424	October 12, 2019	Baek Seol-hee	Yoon Hee-Jung & Kim Soo-yeon	Carmen's Nocturne	Boohwal (440)
424	October 12, 2019	Baek Seol-hee	Shin Hyun-hee (Seenroot)	America Chinatown	Boohwal (440)
424	October 12, 2019	Baek Seol-hee	Sook Haeng	San Francisco	Boohwal (440)
424	October 12, 2019	Baek Seol-hee	Boohwal	Spring Days Flit Through My Mind	Boohwal (440)
425	October 19, 2019	DJ Bae Cheol-soo	Romantic Punch	Sugar	Yoo Hwe-seung (432)
425	October 19, 2019	DJ Bae Cheol-soo	Jannabi	Viva la Vida	Yoo Hwe-seung (432)
425	October 19, 2019	DJ Bae Cheol-soo	Johan Kim	Hey Jude	Yoo Hwe-seung (432)
425	October 19, 2019	DJ Bae Cheol-soo	Forestella	Heal the World	Yoo Hwe-seung (432)
425	October 19, 2019	DJ Bae Cheol-soo	Bobby Kim	Someone like You	Yoo Hwe-seung (432)
425	October 19, 2019	DJ Bae Cheol-soo	Yoo Hwe-seung (N.Flying)	We Are the Champions	Yoo Hwe-seung (432)
426	October 26, 2019	Insooni	Kim Kyung-ho	Happiness	Miraclass (423)
426	October 26, 2019	Insooni	"Sejong, 1446" (Nam Kyung-ju & Jeong Sang-yun & Kim Jun-young)	A Goose's Dream	Miraclass (423)
426	October 26, 2019	Insooni	Huh Gak	Father	Miraclass (423)
426	October 26, 2019	Insooni	Solji	Night After Night	Miraclass (423)
426	October 26, 2019	Insooni	Miraclass	Weeping Willow	Miraclass (423)
426	October 26, 2019	Insooni	Yoo Hwe-seung (N.Flying)	Mom	Miraclass (423)
427	November 2, 2019	Park Sung-hoon	Kei (Lovelyz)	The Man Who Abandoned Me	Hong Kyung-min & Park Seo-jin (442)
427	November 2, 2019	Park Sung-hoon	Yoo Hwe-seung (N.Flying)	Love is Not a Joke	Hong Kyung-min & Park Seo-jin (442)
427	November 2, 2019	Park Sung-hoon	Son Tae-jin (Forte di Quattro) & Ko Young-yul	Love Must Be a Butterfly	Hong Kyung-min & Park Seo-jin (442)
427	November 2, 2019	Park Sung-hoon	Romantic Punch	The Rope of Love	Hong Kyung-min & Park Seo-jin (442)
427	November 2, 2019	Park Sung-hoon	Hong Ja	I Hate It	Hong Kyung-min & Park Seo-jin (442)
427	November 2, 2019	Park Sung-hoon	Hong Kyung-min & Park Seo-jin	Broken Clock	Hong Kyung-min & Park Seo-jin (442)
428	November 9, 2019	Park Geun-tae	HYNN	I Won't Love	N.Flying (424)
428	November 9, 2019	Park Geun-tae	Lee Ji-hoon	Happy Me	N.Flying (424)
428	November 9, 2019	Park Geun-tae	South Club	Sonata of Temptation	N.Flying (424)
428	November 9, 2019	Park Geun-tae	V.O.S	Sunflower	N.Flying (424)
428	November 9, 2019	Park Geun-tae	N.Flying	Friend	N.Flying (424)
428	November 9, 2019	Park Geun-tae	Seo In-young	As Time Goes By	N.Flying (424)
429	November 16, 2019	Cha Jung-rak & Bae Ho	Forestella	Goodbye	Baek Chung-kang (414)
429	November 16, 2019	Cha Jung-rak & Bae Ho	Lee Se-joon (Yurisangja)	The End of Love	Baek Chung-kang (414)
429	November 16, 2019	Cha Jung-rak & Bae Ho	The Barberettes	Love Who Left Me Along the Leaves	Baek Chung-kang (414)
429	November 16, 2019	Cha Jung-rak & Bae Ho	Monday Kiz	I Come Back to Samgakji	Baek Chung-kang (414)
429	November 16, 2019	Cha Jung-rak & Bae Ho	Yoo Hwe-seung (N.Flying)	The One Who Has Gone into the Fog	Baek Chung-kang (414)
429	November 16, 2019	Cha Jung-rak & Bae Ho	Baek Chung-kang	Who's Crying	Baek Chung-kang (414)
430	November 23, 2019	Yoo Yeol	Hong Kyung-min	The Way You Look Right Now	Jeong Young-joo (416)
430	November 23, 2019	Yoo Yeol	HYNN	A Song of Love	Jeong Young-joo (416)
430	November 23, 2019	Yoo Yeol	Baek Chung-kang	First Love	Jeong Young-joo (416)
430	November 23, 2019	Yoo Yeol	Jeong Young-joo	Brilliant Days Have Gone	Jeong Young-joo (416)
430	November 23, 2019	Yoo Yeol	Yoo Hwe-seung (N.Flying)	Suddenly, One Day	Jeong Young-joo (416)
430	November 23, 2019	Yoo Yeol	Yuk Joong Wan Band	Autumn Rain	Jeong Young-joo (416)
431	November 30, 2019	Park Jin-young	Yoo Hwe-seung (N.Flying)	Love and Remember	Monni (398)
431	November 30, 2019	Park Jin-young	Ravi	How to Avoid the Sun	Monni (398)
431	November 30, 2019	Park Jin-young	Kim Yong-jin	Love Has Gone Again	Monni (398)
431	November 30, 2019	Park Jin-young	Jung Yu-ji	Nobody	Monni (398)
431	November 30, 2019	Park Jin-young	Monni	Who's Your Mama?	Monni (398)
431	November 30, 2019	Park Jin-young	Forte di Quattro	December 32	Monni (398)
432	December 7, 2019	Park Jin-young	Ivy	24 Hours	Yuk Joong Wan Band (407)
432	December 7, 2019	Park Jin-young	Yuk Joong Wan Band	Don't Leave Me	Yuk Joong Wan Band (407)
432	December 7, 2019	Park Jin-young	Byul	Lies	Yuk Joong Wan Band (407)
432	December 7, 2019	Park Jin-young	Stray Kids	Again & Again	Yuk Joong Wan Band (407)
432	December 7, 2019	Park Jin-young	HoooW (Son Ho-young & Kim Tae-woo)	Honey	Yuk Joong Wan Band (407)
432	December 7, 2019	Park Jin-young	Jeong Se-woon	Invitation	Yuk Joong Wan Band (407)
433	December 14, 2019	2019 King of Kings Special	Hong Kyung-min & Park Seo-jin	Anyhow Song	Forestella (417)
433	December 14, 2019	2019 King of Kings Special	Jung Yu-ji	Musical	Forestella (417)
433	December 14, 2019	2019 King of Kings Special	Forestella	The Unwritten Legend	Forestella (417)
433	December 14, 2019	2019 King of Kings Special	Huh Gak	Though I loved You	Forestella (417)
433	December 14, 2019	2019 King of Kings Special	Lee Chang-min	Forever	Forestella (417)
433	December 14, 2019	2019 King of Kings Special	Jung Dong-ha	"We Will Rock You" & "Plastic Syndrome" & "Bohemian Rhapsody"	Forestella (417)
434	December 21, 2019	2019 King of Kings Special	Kim Joon Su, Yoo Tae Pyung Yang & Ko Young-yul	IDOL	Hoppipolla (420)
434	December 21, 2019	2019 King of Kings Special	Yoo Hwe-seung N.Flying	Entertainer	Hoppipolla (420)
434	December 21, 2019	2019 King of Kings Special	Lee Ji-hoon & Son Jun-ho	We Are	Hoppipolla (420)
434	December 21, 2019	2019 King of Kings Special	Monni	The Shining Light in the Flower	Hoppipolla (420)
434	December 21, 2019	2019 King of Kings Special	JK Kim Dong-wook	In the Rain	Hoppipolla (420)
434	December 21, 2019	2019 King of Kings Special	Hoppipolla	One Million Roses	Hoppipolla (420)
435	December 28, 2019	Year-End Special with Lee Mi-ja	Yoonhan	A Woman's Life (Piano Accompaniment)	
435	December 28, 2019	Year-End Special with Lee Mi-ja	Lee Mi-ja	"Pure Nineteen" & "Blues of Dusk"	
435	December 28, 2019	Year-End Special with Lee Mi-ja	Sonya	"Music Is My Life" & "The Girl of Heuksando"	
435	December 28, 2019	Year-End Special with Lee Mi-ja	Lee Soo-young	"Lady" & "Cry Hot Wind"	
435	December 28, 2019	Year-End Special with Lee Mi-ja	Lee Se-joon (Yurisangja)	"Yellow Sail" & "Journey"	
435	December 28, 2019	Year-End Special with Lee Mi-ja	Lee Mi-ja	"The Old Site of Ruined Castle", "Flower of My Hometown", "Hometown Snow", "Blue Dream of the Tea Room" & "Carriage of Flowers"	
435	December 28, 2019	Year-End Special with Lee Mi-ja	Min Woo-hyuk	"Goose Daddy" & "Goodbye Seoul"	
435	December 28, 2019	Year-End Special with Lee Mi-ja	Jang Hye-jin	"The Reason of My Life" & "The Island Teacher"	
435	December 28, 2019	Year-End Special with Lee Mi-ja	Lee Mi-ja	"Sambaekri Hanryeosudo" & "Mother's Love"	
435	December 28, 2019	Year-End Special with Lee Mi-ja	Lee Mi-ja	"Leave Without a Word", "The Path of Lovers" & "Last Stop"	
435	December 28, 2019	Year-End Special with Lee Mi-ja	Lee Mi-ja	Camellia Lady	
435	December 28, 2019	Year-End Special with Lee Mi-ja	Lee Mi-ja & other guests	My Song and My Love	

=== 2020 ===
List of episodes aired in 2020

Singers listed in order of performance.

Episode #	Broadcast Date	Legend or Theme	Guest Singers	Songs	Final Winner (Votes)
436	January 4, 2020	New Year Special	Choi Sung-Soo & NC.A	Going Together	Choi Jung-won & Lee So-jung (424)
436	January 4, 2020	New Year Special	Golden	You Are the One I Love	Choi Jung-won & Lee So-jung (424)
436	January 4, 2020	New Year Special	Hong Kyung-min & The Heima	Going Round and Round	Choi Jung-won & Lee So-jung (424)
436	January 4, 2020	New Year Special	Baek Chung-kang	Azaleas	Choi Jung-won & Lee So-jung (424)
436	January 4, 2020	New Year Special	Choi Jung-won & Lee So-jung	"Arabian Nights", "Speechless", "A Whole New World" (Aladdin OST medley)	Choi Jung-won & Lee So-jung (424)
436	January 4, 2020	New Year Special	Song So-hee & Ahn Ye-eun	In the Wilderness	Choi Jung-won & Lee So-jung (424)
437	January 11, 2020	Jang Wook-jo	Baek Chung-kang	Wound	Yuk Joong Wan Band (421)
437	January 11, 2020	Jang Wook-jo	HYNN	Baby Doll	Yuk Joong Wan Band (421)
437	January 11, 2020	Jang Wook-jo	Kim Kyung-hun	Can't You Return It?	Yuk Joong Wan Band (421)
437	January 11, 2020	Jang Wook-jo	ALi	Thousand Year Stone	Yuk Joong Wan Band (421)
437	January 11, 2020	Jang Wook-jo	Nam Hyun-joon & Park Ae-ri	How Do I Say?	Yuk Joong Wan Band (421)
437	January 11, 2020	Jang Wook-jo	Yuk Joong Wan Band	Note of Youth	Yuk Joong Wan Band (421)
438	January 18, 2020	The Legends Sing	Choi Jin-hee	Toy Soldier	Min Hae-kyung (429)
438	January 18, 2020	The Legends Sing	Kim Bum-ryong	The Maze of Love	Min Hae-kyung (429)
438	January 18, 2020	The Legends Sing	Min Hae-kyung	Wind Wind Wind	Min Hae-kyung (429)
438	January 18, 2020	The Legends Sing	Kwon In-ha	The Face I Miss	Min Hae-kyung (429)
438	January 18, 2020	The Legends Sing	Choi Sung-soo	Watercolor Painting in a Rainy Day	Min Hae-kyung (429)
438	January 18, 2020	The Legends Sing	Park Kang-sung	Reunion	Min Hae-kyung (429)
439	January 25, 2020	Spend Your Holidays With Friends	Song Ga-in & Sook Haeng	Mona Lisa	Hwang Chi-yeul & Kangnam (418)
439	January 25, 2020	Spend Your Holidays With Friends	Kim Tae-won & Baek Chung-kang	Heenari	Hwang Chi-yeul & Kangnam (418)
439	January 25, 2020	Spend Your Holidays With Friends	Maheun Five	Kungtari Shabara	Hwang Chi-yeul & Kangnam (418)
439	January 25, 2020	Spend Your Holidays With Friends	Yang Chi-seung & Choi Eun-joo	Joy	Hwang Chi-yeul & Kangnam (418)
439	January 25, 2020	Spend Your Holidays With Friends	Hwang Chi-yeul & Kangnam	Woman of Samba	Hwang Chi-yeul & Kangnam (418)
439	January 25, 2020	Spend Your Holidays With Friends	Hwang Seok-jeong & Kim Yong-woo	Han River	Hwang Chi-yeul & Kangnam (418)
440	February 1, 2020	Ha Choon-hwa & Hyeon Cheol	Min Woo-hyuk	Always Thinking About You	Min Woo-hyuk (402)
440	February 1, 2020	Ha Choon-hwa & Hyeon Cheol	Hyun Jin-young	The Man Who Abandoned Me	Min Woo-hyuk (402)
440	February 1, 2020	Ha Choon-hwa & Hyeon Cheol	Nam Hyun-joon & Park Ae-ri	Give Me Back My Youth	Min Woo-hyuk (402)
440	February 1, 2020	Ha Choon-hwa & Hyeon Cheol	Jung Yu-ji	The One I Met by the River	Min Woo-hyuk (402)
440	February 1, 2020	Ha Choon-hwa & Hyeon Cheol	Jung Mi-ae	A Waterfowl	Min Woo-hyuk (402)
440	February 1, 2020	Ha Choon-hwa & Hyeon Cheol	THE BOYZ	Arirang Mokdong	Min Woo-hyuk (402)
441	February 8, 2020	Ha Choon-hwa & Hyeon Cheol	Kim Kyung-ho & Kwak Dong-hyun	Yeongam Arirang	Kim Kyung-ho & Kwak Dong-hyun (413)
441	February 8, 2020	Ha Choon-hwa & Hyeon Cheol	Choi Jung-won	Love Must Be a Butterfly	Kim Kyung-ho & Kwak Dong-hyun (413)
441	February 8, 2020	Ha Choon-hwa & Hyeon Cheol	Choi Ye-geun	Name Tag of Love	Kim Kyung-ho & Kwak Dong-hyun (413)
441	February 8, 2020	Ha Choon-hwa & Hyeon Cheol	Navi	My Heart Along With the Stars	Kim Kyung-ho & Kwak Dong-hyun (413)
441	February 8, 2020	Ha Choon-hwa & Hyeon Cheol	Baek Chung-kang	Impatiens Love	Kim Kyung-ho & Kwak Dong-hyun (413)
441	February 8, 2020	Ha Choon-hwa & Hyeon Cheol	Hong Kyung-min	Good Job, Good Job	Kim Kyung-ho & Kwak Dong-hyun (413)
442	February 15, 2020	The Grand Comeback of 2020	Emerald Castle	Footsteps	Hyun Jin-young with Golden Child
442	February 15, 2020	The Grand Comeback of 2020	Lee Jae-young	Temptation	Hyun Jin-young with Golden Child
442	February 15, 2020	The Grand Comeback of 2020	Kim June-sun	Arabian Night	Hyun Jin-young with Golden Child
442	February 15, 2020	The Grand Comeback of 2020	Hyun Jin-young with Golden Child	My Dear in My Vague Memories	Hyun Jin-young with Golden Child
442	February 15, 2020	The Grand Comeback of 2020	Yukgaksu with Yoo Tae Pyung Yang	HeungBo	Hyun Jin-young with Golden Child
442	February 15, 2020	The Grand Comeback of 2020	Space A with Suh Paul	"Sexy Man" & "Scarlett Letter" medley	Hyun Jin-young with Golden Child
443	February 22, 2020	Na Ae-sim	WoongSan	Adada	Choi Ye-Geun
443	February 22, 2020	Na Ae-sim	ALi	As Time Goes By	Choi Ye-Geun
443	February 22, 2020	Na Ae-sim	Jeong Young-ju	I Don't Mambo	Choi Ye-Geun
443	February 22, 2020	Na Ae-sim	Yuk Joong Wan Band	The Church Bell	Choi Ye-Geun
443	February 22, 2020	Na Ae-sim	Paul Potts with Kim Ri	Don't Ask About the Past	Choi Ye-Geun
443	February 22, 2020	Na Ae-sim	Choi Ye-Geun	When Acacias Bloom	Choi Ye-Geun
444	February 29, 2020	Jung Su-ra	Monni	Ah! Republic of Korea	The Rose
444	February 29, 2020	Jung Su-ra	PENTAGON (Jinho & Hui)	Joy	The Rose
444	February 29, 2020	Jung Su-ra	Min Woo-hyuk	Father's Chair	The Rose
444	February 29, 2020	Jung Su-ra	Song So-hee	Have You Seen My Love	The Rose
444	February 29, 2020	Jung Su-ra	The Rose	City Street	The Rose
444	February 29, 2020	Jung Su-ra	Jeong Young-ju	Was It the Wind	The Rose
445	March 7, 2020	The Sons and Daughters of KBS	ALi	My Love By My Side	Nam Hyun-joon & Park Ae-ri
445	March 7, 2020	The Sons and Daughters of KBS	Jo Myeong-seop	"The Moonlight Night in Silla" & "Besame Mucho" medley	Nam Hyun-joon & Park Ae-ri
445	March 7, 2020	The Sons and Daughters of KBS	Choi Ye-geun	Wild Flower	Nam Hyun-joon & Park Ae-ri
445	March 7, 2020	The Sons and Daughters of KBS	Park Seo-jin	Wild Rose	Nam Hyun-joon & Park Ae-ri
445	March 7, 2020	The Sons and Daughters of KBS	Nam Hyun-joon & Park Ae-ri	Arirang	Nam Hyun-joon & Park Ae-ri
445	March 7, 2020	The Sons and Daughters of KBS	Park Sang-chul	"No Matter What" & "Apartment" medley	Nam Hyun-joon & Park Ae-ri
446	March 14, 2020	Shin Seung-hun	Forestella	For a Long Time After That	Lee Seok-hoon
446	March 14, 2020	Shin Seung-hun	Victon	Romeo and Juliet	Lee Seok-hoon
446	March 14, 2020	Shin Seung-hun	Jeong Young-ju	Invisible Love	Lee Seok-hoon
446	March 14, 2020	Shin Seung-hun	Monni	Turn on the Radio	Lee Seok-hoon
446	March 14, 2020	Shin Seung-hun	Lee Seok-hoon	I Believe	Lee Seok-hoon
446	March 14, 2020	Shin Seung-hun	Sejeong	Reflection of You in Your Smile	Lee Seok-hoon
447	March 21, 2020	Prodigies with a Bright Future	An So-myeong & Kim So-hyun	Golden Stars	Kim Tae-yeon & Nam Sang-il
447	March 21, 2020	Prodigies with a Bright Future	Yang Tae-hwan & Monni	Turn on the Radio Loudly	Kim Tae-yeon & Nam Sang-il
447	March 21, 2020	Prodigies with a Bright Future	Hong Jam-eon & Park Sang-chul	Dear Ja Ok	Kim Tae-yeon & Nam Sang-il
447	March 21, 2020	Prodigies with a Bright Future	Kim Tae-yeon & Nam Sang-il	"Sugungga" & "Troubled" medley	Kim Tae-yeon & Nam Sang-il
447	March 21, 2020	Prodigies with a Bright Future	Na Ha-eun & VERIVERY	Fire	Kim Tae-yeon & Nam Sang-il
447	March 21, 2020	Prodigies with a Bright Future	Campbell Asia & Yoo Hwe-seung (N.Flying)	Someone like You	Kim Tae-yeon & Nam Sang-il
448	March 28, 2020	SSAW & Light and Salt	Kim Yeon-ji	After You Left	Purple Rain
448	March 28, 2020	SSAW & Light and Salt	Jung Seung-hwan	People Must All Change	Purple Rain
448	March 28, 2020	SSAW & Light and Salt	Jung Dong-ha	Old Friend	Purple Rain
448	March 28, 2020	SSAW & Light and Salt	ALi	Someone's Dream	Purple Rain
448	March 28, 2020	SSAW & Light and Salt	DICKPUNKS	The Shampoo Fairy	Purple Rain
448	March 28, 2020	SSAW & Light and Salt	Purple Rain	Like Rain and Music	Purple Rain
449	April 4, 2020	Joo Hyun-mi	Kim Young-min (Taesaja)	Teary Blues	Song Ga-in
449	April 4, 2020	Joo Hyun-mi	Min Woo-hyuk	Regret Over Tears	Song Ga-in
449	April 4, 2020	Joo Hyun-mi	Song Ga-in	I Really Liked It	Song Ga-in
449	April 4, 2020	Joo Hyun-mi	Lee Ji-hoon & Son Jun-ho	In Your Memories	Song Ga-in
449	April 4, 2020	Joo Hyun-mi	N.Flying	Ye Lai Xiang	Song Ga-in
449	April 4, 2020	Joo Hyun-mi	Haena (MATILDA)	Love Letter	Song Ga-in
450	April 11, 2020	Joo Hyun-mi	Sejeong	We Met Again	Jo Meyong-seop & Jeong Soo-yeon (tie)
450	April 11, 2020	Joo Hyun-mi	Iz*One	Unrequited Love	Jo Meyong-seop & Jeong Soo-yeon (tie)
450	April 11, 2020	Joo Hyun-mi	Yoo Tae Pyung Yang	Hold On with Prostitute's Song	Jo Meyong-seop & Jeong Soo-yeon (tie)
450	April 11, 2020	Joo Hyun-mi	Jo Myeon-seop	Itaewon Love Song	Jo Meyong-seop & Jeong Soo-yeon (tie)
450	April 11, 2020	Joo Hyun-mi	Weki Meki	Shinsa-dong and the Man	Jo Meyong-seop & Jeong Soo-yeon (tie)
450	April 11, 2020	Joo Hyun-mi	Jeong Soo-yeon	Raining Over Yeongdong Bridge	Jo Meyong-seop & Jeong Soo-yeon (tie)
451	April 18, 2020	The 90s' Kids Special	Ben	In Dream	Purple Rain
451	April 18, 2020	The 90s' Kids Special	Hynn	Whistle to Me	Purple Rain
451	April 18, 2020	The 90s' Kids Special	Ravi & Xydo	See Through	Purple Rain
451	April 18, 2020	The 90s' Kids Special	Jeong Se-woon	Ask Myself	Purple Rain
451	April 18, 2020	The 90s' Kids Special	Yoo Hwe-seung (N.Flying)	25, 21	Purple Rain
451	April 18, 2020	The 90s' Kids Special	Purple Rain	It's Art	Purple Rain
452	April 25, 2020	KBS Top 10 Songs	Kim Bum-ryong	I Ran Into You	Lee Eun-ha
452	April 25, 2020	KBS Top 10 Songs	Park Nam-jung	Like an Indian Doll	Lee Eun-ha
452	April 25, 2020	KBS Top 10 Songs	Lee Sang-woo	Parting & Please medley	Lee Eun-ha
452	April 25, 2020	KBS Top 10 Songs	Jung Su-ra	I Can't Find the Nightingale	Lee Eun-ha
452	April 25, 2020	KBS Top 10 Songs	Lee Chi-hyun	Back to You Again	Lee Eun-ha
452	April 25, 2020	KBS Top 10 Songs	Lee Eun-ha	My Love Fades Away	Lee Eun-ha
453	May 2, 2020	Park Sang-chul vs. Park Hyun-bin	Lee Chang-min (Team Park Hyun-bin)	Sparkle Sparkle	K-TIGERS ZERO
453	May 2, 2020	Park Sang-chul vs. Park Hyun-bin	Choi Jung-won (Team Park Sang-chul)	No Matter What	K-TIGERS ZERO
453	May 2, 2020	Park Sang-chul vs. Park Hyun-bin	Forestella (Team Park Hyun-bin)	Dead Drunk	K-TIGERS ZERO
453	May 2, 2020	Park Sang-chul vs. Park Hyun-bin	Purple Rain (Team Park Sang-chul)	Dear Ja Ok	K-TIGERS ZERO
453	May 2, 2020	Park Sang-chul vs. Park Hyun-bin	Yuk Joong Wan Band (Team Park Hyun-bin)	Trust Your Darling	K-TIGERS ZERO
453	May 2, 2020	Park Sang-chul vs. Park Hyun-bin	K-TIGERS ZERO (Team Park Sang-chul)	The Man from the Port	K-TIGERS ZERO
454	May 9, 2020	2020 Family Special	Jung Mi-ae & Jo Sung-hwan	You and I	YOYOMI & Park Si-won
454	May 9, 2020	2020 Family Special	Park Gu-yoon & Park Jung-wook	Unpredictable Life	YOYOMI & Park Si-won
454	May 9, 2020	2020 Family Special	Park Kang-sung & Rue	Family Portrait	YOYOMI & Park Si-won
454	May 9, 2020	2020 Family Special	YOYOMI & Park Si-won	I Like You	YOYOMI & Park Si-won
454	May 9, 2020	2020 Family Special	Yuk Joong Wan Band & Kang Deok-cheon	The Last Leaf	YOYOMI & Park Si-won
454	May 9, 2020	2020 Family Special	Roh Ji-hoon & Lee Eun-hye	Every Day, Every Moment	YOYOMI & Park Si-won
455	May 16, 2020	Cho Young-soo	Forte di Quattro	No One Else	Monni
455	May 16, 2020	Cho Young-soo	Loona	Love Battery	Monni
455	May 16, 2020	Cho Young-soo	Yoo Hwe-seung (N.Flying)	Love and War	Monni
455	May 16, 2020	Cho Young-soo	K-TIGERS ZERO	Brand New	Monni
455	May 16, 2020	Cho Young-soo	Monday Kiz	Crazy Love Song	Monni
455	May 16, 2020	Cho Young-soo	Monni	Lalala	Monni
456	May 23, 2020	Song Hae Song Festival	Kim Hee-jae	Call the Soul	Jeong Dong-won
456	May 23, 2020	Song Hae Song Festival	Jang Min-ho	The Man's Life Story	Jeong Dong-won
457	May 30, 2020	Song Hae Song Festival	Jeong Dong-won	Who's Crying	Jeong Dong-won
457	May 30, 2020	Song Hae Song Festival	Lee Chan-won	Single-minded Dandelion	Jeong Dong-won
457	May 30, 2020	Song Hae Song Festival	Young Tak	Never	Jeong Dong-won
457	May 30, 2020	Song Hae Song Festival	Lim Young-woong	Wretched Love	Jeong Dong-won
458	June 6, 2020	Men Who Fly High	Roh Ji-hoon	I Wish Now It Will Be That	Na Tae-joo
458	June 6, 2020	Men Who Fly High	Ryu Ji-kwang	Foggy Jangchungdan Park	Na Tae-joo
458	June 6, 2020	Men Who Fly High	Ko Jae-geun	Love and Life	Na Tae-joo
458	June 6, 2020	Men Who Fly High	Kim Soo-chan	Nest	Na Tae-joo
458	June 6, 2020	Men Who Fly High	Mister T	Ecstatic Proposal	Na Tae-joo
458	June 6, 2020	Men Who Fly High	Na Tae-joo	Jang Yoon-jeong Twist	Na Tae-joo
459	June 13, 2020	20th Anniversary of the June 15th North–South Joint Declaration, Here Comes Peace	ALi	Beautiful Country	Forestella
459	June 13, 2020	20th Anniversary of the June 15th North–South Joint Declaration, Here Comes Peace	K-TIGERS ZERO	Dreaming of Bal-hae	Forestella
459	June 13, 2020	20th Anniversary of the June 15th North–South Joint Declaration, Here Comes Peace	Song So-hee	"As I Live" & "Song of Peace"	Forestella
459	June 13, 2020	20th Anniversary of the June 15th North–South Joint Declaration, Here Comes Peace	Ha Dong-kyun	Said	Forestella
459	June 13, 2020	20th Anniversary of the June 15th North–South Joint Declaration, Here Comes Peace	Purple Rain	Friend	Forestella
459	June 13, 2020	20th Anniversary of the June 15th North–South Joint Declaration, Here Comes Peace	Forestella	A Letter from a Private	Forestella
460	June 20, 2020	Popular Songs of the 1st Half of 2020	N.Flying	Aloha	Kim Ho-joong
460	June 20, 2020	Popular Songs of the 1st Half of 2020	Jung Dong-ha	Any Song	Kim Ho-joong
460	June 20, 2020	Popular Songs of the 1st Half of 2020	Kim Ho-joong	The Story of a Couple in Their 60s	Kim Ho-joong
460	June 20, 2020	Popular Songs of the 1st Half of 2020	Seo J	At Andong Station	Kim Ho-joong
460	June 20, 2020	Popular Songs of the 1st Half of 2020	K-TIGERS ZERO	"Thumb Up" & "GANG"	Kim Ho-joong
460	June 20, 2020	Popular Songs of the 1st Half of 2020	Jo Myeong-seop	Evergreen Tree	Kim Ho-joong
461	June 27, 2020	6 Unique Little Stars Special	Nam Seung-min	Mother	Kwak Dong-hyun
461	June 27, 2020	6 Unique Little Stars Special	Kwak Dong-hyun	My Love in the Heaven	Kwak Dong-hyun
461	June 27, 2020	6 Unique Little Stars Special	Parc Jae-jung	Saying I Love You Again	Kwak Dong-hyun
461	June 27, 2020	6 Unique Little Stars Special	YOYOMI	Daybreak Rain	Kwak Dong-hyun
461	June 27, 2020	6 Unique Little Stars Special	Kim Soo-chan	It's You	Kwak Dong-hyun
461	June 27, 2020	6 Unique Little Stars Special	Ben	I Always Miss You	Kwak Dong-hyun
462	July 4, 2020	King of Kings Special: 1st Half of 2020	Na Tae-joo	Olle	Forestella
462	July 4, 2020	King of Kings Special: 1st Half of 2020	Monni	Sad Beatrice	Forestella
462	July 4, 2020	King of Kings Special: 1st Half of 2020	Purple Rain	With You Forever	Forestella
462	July 4, 2020	King of Kings Special: 1st Half of 2020	Kim Kyung-ho	Goodbye	Forestella
462	July 4, 2020	King of Kings Special: 1st Half of 2020	Forestella	Champions	Forestella
462	July 4, 2020	King of Kings Special: 1st Half of 2020	Choi Jung-won	Unreasonable Reason	Forestella
463	July 11, 2020	King of Kings Special: 1st Half of 2020	Jo Myeong-seop	Keep Silent When Leaving	Kim Tae-yeon & Nam Sang-il
463	July 11, 2020	King of Kings Special: 1st Half of 2020	Min Woo-hyuk	Lazenca, Save Us	Kim Tae-yeon & Nam Sang-il
463	July 11, 2020	King of Kings Special: 1st Half of 2020	YOYOMI	Weed	Kim Tae-yeon & Nam Sang-il
463	July 11, 2020	King of Kings Special: 1st Half of 2020	Yuk Joong-wan Band	I Know	Kim Tae-yeon & Nam Sang-il
463	July 11, 2020	King of Kings Special: 1st Half of 2020	Kim Tae-yeon & Nam Sang-il	"Shimcheongga" & "Song of Hope"	Kim Tae-yeon & Nam Sang-il
463	July 11, 2020	King of Kings Special: 1st Half of 2020	Kim Ho-joong	Tragic Love	Kim Tae-yeon & Nam Sang-il
464	July 18, 2020	Summer Special 1: Friends Special	Solji & IRO	Breathe	Kim Tae-woo & Lim Jeong-hee
464	July 18, 2020	Summer Special 1: Friends Special	Park Seo-jin & Kim Na-hee	I Don't Know Yet What Love Is	Kim Tae-woo & Lim Jeong-hee
464	July 18, 2020	Summer Special 1: Friends Special	Jang Eun-ah & ALi	Defying Gravity (Korean Version)	Kim Tae-woo & Lim Jeong-hee
464	July 18, 2020	Summer Special 1: Friends Special	Kim Tae-woo & Lim Jeong-hee	Just a Feeling	Kim Tae-woo & Lim Jeong-hee
464	July 18, 2020	Summer Special 1: Friends Special	Kwon Hyuk-soo & KCM	Break Up With Her	Kim Tae-woo & Lim Jeong-hee
464	July 18, 2020	Summer Special 1: Friends Special	Jin Si-mon & Kim Ho-joong	Just Say It	Kim Tae-woo & Lim Jeong-hee
465	July 25, 2020	Summer Special 2: Summer Queen Song Festival	Song Ga-in	Miss Boatwoman	Jung Mi-ae
465	July 25, 2020	Summer Special 2: Summer Queen Song Festival	Jung Da-kyung	Festival	Jung Mi-ae
465	July 25, 2020	Summer Special 2: Summer Queen Song Festival	Jung Mi-ae	Lie on the Sea	Jung Mi-ae
465	July 25, 2020	Summer Special 2: Summer Queen Song Festival	Hong Ja	Port in Great Land	Jung Mi-ae
465	July 25, 2020	Summer Special 2: Summer Queen Song Festival	Sook Haeng	Summer Time	Jung Mi-ae
465	July 25, 2020	Summer Special 2: Summer Queen Song Festival	Kim So-you	Hainan Love	Jung Mi-ae
466	August 1, 2020	Summer Special 3: Legendary Dance Special	Taesaja	The Way	Se7en
466	August 1, 2020	Summer Special 3: Legendary Dance Special	Chae Yeon	Two of Us	Se7en
466	August 1, 2020	Summer Special 3: Legendary Dance Special	Jun Jin (Shinhwa)	Wa	Se7en
466	August 1, 2020	Summer Special 3: Legendary Dance Special	Se7en	Passion	Se7en
466	August 1, 2020	Summer Special 3: Legendary Dance Special	Hong Kyung-min & Na Tae-joo	Broken Friendship	Se7en
466	August 1, 2020	Summer Special 3: Legendary Dance Special	ZAZA	On the Bus	Se7en
467	August 8, 2020	Kim Eana	Tei (singer)	Perhaps Love	Lim Jeong-hee
467	August 8, 2020	Kim Eana	Im Han-byul & Ha Sung-woon	Meet Him Among Them	Lim Jeong-hee
467	August 8, 2020	Kim Eana	2F	Breath	Lim Jeong-hee
467	August 8, 2020	Kim Eana	Iz*One	Nagging	Lim Jeong-hee
467	August 8, 2020	Kim Eana	Lim Jeong-hee	Appear (Secret Garden OST)	Lim Jeong-hee
467	August 8, 2020	Kim Eana	Jo Jung-min	Abracadabra	Lim Jeong-hee
468	August 15, 2020	Kang Jin & Jin Sung	Park Gu-yoon	Don't Tackle Me	Park Seo-jin
468	August 15, 2020	Kang Jin & Jin Sung	Kim Ho-joong	One's Impoverished Days	Park Seo-jin
468	August 15, 2020	Kang Jin & Jin Sung	Young Ki	Bumble Bee	Park Seo-jin
468	August 15, 2020	Kang Jin & Jin Sung	Shin Yu	At Andong Station	Park Seo-jin
468	August 15, 2020	Kang Jin & Jin Sung	Shin In-sun	Love Triangle	Park Seo-jin
468	August 15, 2020	Kang Jin & Jin Sung	Park Seo-jin	A Cup of Makgeolli	Park Seo-jin
469	August 22, 2020	Kim Jong-kook & Turbo	YOYOMI	Loveable	Jo Kwon, Shin Joo-hyup & MJ (Cast of Jamie)
469	August 22, 2020	Kim Jong-kook & Turbo	ELRIS	White Love	Jo Kwon, Shin Joo-hyup & MJ (Cast of Jamie)
469	August 22, 2020	Kim Jong-kook & Turbo	La Poem	Star, Wind, Sunshine, and Love	Jo Kwon, Shin Joo-hyup & MJ (Cast of Jamie)
469	August 22, 2020	Kim Jong-kook & Turbo	B.O.Y	My Childhood Dream	Jo Kwon, Shin Joo-hyup & MJ (Cast of Jamie)
469	August 22, 2020	Kim Jong-kook & Turbo	Jung Dong-ha	Love Is...(3+3=0)	Jo Kwon, Shin Joo-hyup & MJ (Cast of Jamie)
469	August 22, 2020	Kim Jong-kook & Turbo	Jo Kwon, Shin Joo-hyup & MJ (Cast of Jamie)	Twist King	Jo Kwon, Shin Joo-hyup & MJ (Cast of Jamie)
470	August 29, 2020	Kim Jong-kook & Turbo	Car, the Garden	A Jazz Bar	Ateez
470	August 29, 2020	Kim Jong-kook & Turbo	Monni	Standstill	Ateez
470	August 29, 2020	Kim Jong-kook & Turbo	Yuk Joong-wan Band	Goodbye Yesterday	Ateez
470	August 29, 2020	Kim Jong-kook & Turbo	Ateez	Black Cat Nero	Ateez
470	August 29, 2020	Kim Jong-kook & Turbo	Lim Jeong-hee	December	Ateez
471	September 5, 2020	Zombie Detective Special	Im Se-joo	Is Anyone There?	Ha Do-kwon
471	September 5, 2020	Zombie Detective Special	Ahn Se-ha	Things We Took For Granted	Ha Do-kwon
471	September 5, 2020	Zombie Detective Special	Tae Hang-ho	Lonely Night	Ha Do-kwon
471	September 5, 2020	Zombie Detective Special	Lee Joong-ok	You Have a Crush on Me	Ha Do-kwon
471	September 5, 2020	Zombie Detective Special	Choi Jin-hyuk	Peppermint Candy	Ha Do-kwon
471	September 5, 2020	Zombie Detective Special	Ha Do-kwon	"The Flight" & "Amazing Grace"	Ha Do-kwon
471	September 5, 2020	Zombie Detective Special	Park Ju-hyun	Magic Carpet Ride	Ha Do-kwon
472	September 12, 2020	Sul Woon-do	Han Seung-woo & Kang Seung-sik (Victon)	Square One	Nam Hyun-joon & Park Ae-ri
472	September 12, 2020	Sul Woon-do	Park Sang-min	Violet Postcard	Nam Hyun-joon & Park Ae-ri
472	September 12, 2020	Sul Woon-do	Nam Hyun-joon & Park Ae-ri	Woman of Samba	Nam Hyun-joon & Park Ae-ri
472	September 12, 2020	Sul Woon-do	Park Seo-jin	By Chance	Nam Hyun-joon & Park Ae-ri
472	September 12, 2020	Sul Woon-do	Woo Yeon-yi	The Twist of Love	Nam Hyun-joon & Park Ae-ri
472	September 12, 2020	Sul Woon-do	An Sung-hoon	Is Love Like This	Nam Hyun-joon & Park Ae-ri
473	September 19, 2020	2020 Actor Special	Lee Jang-woo	Castle of Glass	Lee Tae-sung & Sung Yu-bin
473	September 19, 2020	2020 Actor Special	Kim Sun-kyung	Nocturn	Lee Tae-sung & Sung Yu-bin
473	September 19, 2020	2020 Actor Special	Kwon Hyuk-soo	It's Just Love	Lee Tae-sung & Sung Yu-bin
473	September 19, 2020	2020 Actor Special	Lee Tae-sung & Sung Yu-bin	Brother	Lee Tae-sung & Sung Yu-bin
473	September 19, 2020	2020 Actor Special	Kim Seung-woo	I Only Know Love	Lee Tae-sung & Sung Yu-bin
473	September 19, 2020	2020 Actor Special	Kim Chung	Binari	Lee Tae-sung & Sung Yu-bin
474	September 26, 2020	Kim Wan-sun	ALi	Too Lonely to Dance Alone	LUCY
474	September 26, 2020	Kim Wan-sun	Duetto (duo)	Let's Forget It	LUCY
474	September 26, 2020	Kim Wan-sun	Stephanie	The Dance in Rhythm	LUCY
474	September 26, 2020	Kim Wan-sun	Kim Kyung-ho	The Pierrot Smiles at Us	LUCY
474	September 26, 2020	Kim Wan-sun	LUCY	Masquerade	LUCY
474	September 26, 2020	Kim Wan-sun	Jung Mi-ae	Only Mine	LUCY
475	October 3, 2020	Chuseok 2020: Comedy Couples Special	Kim Won-hyo & Shim Jin-hwa	Night After Night	Kim Min-ki & Hong Yoon-hwa
475	October 3, 2020	Chuseok 2020: Comedy Couples Special	Park Joon-hyung & Kim Ji-hye	By the Stream	Kim Min-ki & Hong Yoon-hwa
475	October 3, 2020	Chuseok 2020: Comedy Couples Special	Yoon Hyung-bin & Jung Kyung-mi	Born Again	Kim Min-ki & Hong Yoon-hwa
475	October 3, 2020	Chuseok 2020: Comedy Couples Special	Choo Dae-yeob & Lee Eun-mi	Threshold of Twilight Years	Kim Min-ki & Hong Yoon-hwa
475	October 3, 2020	Chuseok 2020: Comedy Couples Special	Kang Jae-joon & Lee Eun-hyung	Sunset Glow	Kim Min-ki & Hong Yoon-hwa
475	October 3, 2020	Chuseok 2020: Comedy Couples Special	Kim Min-ki & Hong Yoon-hwa	Sachigi Sachigi	Kim Min-ki & Hong Yoon-hwa
476	October 10, 2020	"KBS Top 10 Songs" Golden Cup Part 2	Lee Yong	Love Forever	Choi Sung-soo
476	October 10, 2020	"KBS Top 10 Songs" Golden Cup Part 2	Lee Eun-ha	Dear Love	Choi Sung-soo
476	October 10, 2020	"KBS Top 10 Songs" Golden Cup Part 2	Kim Bum-ryong	Dumba Dumba	Choi Sung-soo
476	October 10, 2020	"KBS Top 10 Songs" Golden Cup Part 2	Jung Su-ra	Spring Summer Autumn Winter	Choi Sung-soo
476	October 10, 2020	"KBS Top 10 Songs" Golden Cup Part 2	Kim Soo-hee	Teahouse of the Winter	Choi Sung-soo
476	October 10, 2020	"KBS Top 10 Songs" Golden Cup Part 2	Choi Sung-soo	Myeongdong Calling	Choi Sung-soo
477	October 17, 2020	Showdown Between Male & Female Trot Singers	Jo Jung-min (Female Team)	I Miss You Enough to Hate	Male Team
477	October 17, 2020	Showdown Between Male & Female Trot Singers	Shin Yu (Male Team)	Song for You	Male Team
477	October 17, 2020	Showdown Between Male & Female Trot Singers	Jung Mi-ae (Female Team)	Thousand Year Stone	Male Team
477	October 17, 2020	Showdown Between Male & Female Trot Singers	Kang Jin (Male Team)	Arisu	Male Team
477	October 17, 2020	Showdown Between Male & Female Trot Singers	Kim Yong-im (Female Team)	You Outside the Door	Male Team
477	October 17, 2020	Showdown Between Male & Female Trot Singers	Na Tae-joo (Male Team)	Piggy Back	Male Team
478	October 24, 2020	2020 Korean Traditional Music Special	sEODo Band	Ganggangsullae	Park Ae-ri & Nam Sang-il
478	October 24, 2020	2020 Korean Traditional Music Special	Song So-hee	Pollack	Park Ae-ri & Nam Sang-il
478	October 24, 2020	2020 Korean Traditional Music Special	Kim Tae-yeon	"Chunhyangga" & "Mom Arirang"	Park Ae-ri & Nam Sang-il
478	October 24, 2020	2020 Korean Traditional Music Special	Park Ae-ri & Nam Sang-il	"Shimcheongga" & "The Melancholy of Love"	Park Ae-ri & Nam Sang-il
478	October 24, 2020	2020 Korean Traditional Music Special	Kim Yong-woo	About Romance	Park Ae-ri & Nam Sang-il
478	October 24, 2020	2020 Korean Traditional Music Special	Ko Young-yeol Band	"Old Hometown Station" & "Good Harvest Song"	Park Ae-ri & Nam Sang-il
479	October 31, 2020	Cheer Up, Korea! Celebrity Special Part 1: Go Doo-shim	Monni	One Million Roses	Yoo Tae-pyung-yang
479	October 31, 2020	Cheer Up, Korea! Celebrity Special Part 1: Go Doo-shim	Kim Young-heum	Dream	Yoo Tae-pyung-yang
479	October 31, 2020	Cheer Up, Korea! Celebrity Special Part 1: Go Doo-shim	Young Ki	Cigarette Girl	Yoo Tae-pyung-yang
479	October 31, 2020	Cheer Up, Korea! Celebrity Special Part 1: Go Doo-shim	Im Tae-kyung	Song of Hope	Yoo Tae-pyung-yang
479	October 31, 2020	Cheer Up, Korea! Celebrity Special Part 1: Go Doo-shim	2F	Thank You	Yoo Tae-pyung-yang
479	October 31, 2020	Cheer Up, Korea! Celebrity Special Part 1: Go Doo-shim	Yoo Tae-pyung-yang	Passing Time	Yoo Tae-pyung-yang
480	November 7, 2020	Cheer Up, Korea! Celebrity Special Part 2: Park Se-ri	Kim So-hyun & Son Jun-ho	Evergreen Tree	Kim Young-heum
480	November 7, 2020	Cheer Up, Korea! Celebrity Special Part 2: Park Se-ri	Boohwal	A Goose's Dream	Kim Young-heum
480	November 7, 2020	Cheer Up, Korea! Celebrity Special Part 2: Park Se-ri	Jung Mi-ae	Do You Know	Kim Young-heum
480	November 7, 2020	Cheer Up, Korea! Celebrity Special Part 2: Park Se-ri	Pentagon	Love Rain	Kim Young-heum
480	November 7, 2020	Cheer Up, Korea! Celebrity Special Part 2: Park Se-ri	Lee Se-joon & Ji-an (LUNARSOLAR)	The Blue in You	Kim Young-heum
480	November 7, 2020	Cheer Up, Korea! Celebrity Special Part 2: Park Se-ri	Kim Young-heum	Rain and You	Kim Young-heum
481	November 14, 2020	BTS X Pdogg Special	Koonzoo & ALiEN	FIRE	Son Seung-yeon (Feat. AleXa)
481	November 14, 2020	BTS X Pdogg Special	Song So-hee	Spring Day	Son Seung-yeon (Feat. AleXa)
481	November 14, 2020	BTS X Pdogg Special	Yuk Joong-wan Band	Blood Sweat & Tears	Son Seung-yeon (Feat. AleXa)
481	November 14, 2020	BTS X Pdogg Special	Son Seung-yeon (Feat. AleXa)	DNA	Son Seung-yeon (Feat. AleXa)
481	November 14, 2020	BTS X Pdogg Special	Sunwoo Jung-a	Fake Love	Son Seung-yeon (Feat. AleXa)
481	November 14, 2020	BTS X Pdogg Special	BAE173	I Need U	Son Seung-yeon (Feat. AleXa)
482	November 21, 2020	"Trot National Sports Festival" Special	Hong Kyung-min	Lies	YOYOMI
482	November 21, 2020	"Trot National Sports Festival" Special	Jo Myeong-seop	Wind Wind Wind	YOYOMI
482	November 21, 2020	"Trot National Sports Festival" Special	Shin Yu	Mercury Lamp	YOYOMI
482	November 21, 2020	"Trot National Sports Festival" Special	Song Ga-in	Raining Over Yeongdong Bridge	YOYOMI
482	November 21, 2020	"Trot National Sports Festival" Special	Park Seo-jin	Dear, Don't Change	YOYOMI
482	November 21, 2020	"Trot National Sports Festival" Special	YOYOMI	Unrequited Love	YOYOMI
483	November 28, 2020	"Trot National Sports Festival" Special	Na Tae-joo	Affection	Young Ki
483	November 28, 2020	"Trot National Sports Festival" Special	Hwang Chi-yeul	Because I Am a Man	Young Ki
483	November 28, 2020	"Trot National Sports Festival" Special	Ryu Ji-kwang	Woman Woman Woman	Young Ki
483	November 28, 2020	"Trot National Sports Festival" Special	Cho Yi-hyun	Burden	Young Ki
483	November 28, 2020	"Trot National Sports Festival" Special	Jo Jung-min	Amor Fati	Young Ki
483	November 28, 2020	"Trot National Sports Festival" Special	Young Ki	Nest	Young Ki
484	December 5, 2020	BoA	Romantic Punch	Valenti	B.O.Y & Na Ha-eun
484	December 5, 2020	BoA	Kim Young-heum	No. 1	B.O.Y & Na Ha-eun
484	December 5, 2020	BoA	Stephanie	My Name	B.O.Y & Na Ha-eun
484	December 5, 2020	BoA	DKB	Atlantis Princess	B.O.Y & Na Ha-eun
484	December 5, 2020	BoA	Ben	Only One	B.O.Y & Na Ha-eun
484	December 5, 2020	BoA	B.O.Y & Na Ha-eun	ID; Peace B	B.O.Y & Na Ha-eun
485	December 12, 2020	Cherbourg Special	Namkoong Ok-bun	A Thorn Tree	Park Gang-sung
485	December 12, 2020	Cherbourg Special	Choi Sung-soo	Itinerary	Park Gang-sung
485	December 12, 2020	Cherbourg Special	Kang Seung-mo	Yesterday, Today and...	Park Gang-sung
485	December 12, 2020	Cherbourg Special	Yang Ha-young	Rain on the Window	Park Gang-sung
485	December 12, 2020	Cherbourg Special	Park Gang-sung	Alleyway	Park Gang-sung
485	December 12, 2020	Cherbourg Special	Kang Eun-cheol	Wedding Cake	Park Gang-sung
486	December 19, 2020	2020 Kings of Kings Special	Monni	Love Poem	Yuk Joong-wan Band
486	December 19, 2020	2020 Kings of Kings Special	Min Woo-hyuk	A Letter from a Private	Yuk Joong-wan Band
486	December 19, 2020	2020 Kings of Kings Special	Ateez	Anyhow Song	Yuk Joong-wan Band
486	December 19, 2020	2020 Kings of Kings Special	Na Tae-joo (feat. Jang Jun-hee (K-TIGERS ZERO))	I Swear	Yuk Joong-wan Band
486	December 19, 2020	2020 Kings of Kings Special	Yuk Joong-wan Band	About Romance	Yuk Joong-wan Band
486	December 19, 2020	2020 Kings of Kings Special	Park Ae-ri & Nam Sang-il	"Old Arirang" & "My Nation My People"	Yuk Joong-wan Band
487	December 26, 2020	2020 Kings of Kings Special	Min Hae-kyung	Dash	Forestella
487	December 26, 2020	2020 Kings of Kings Special	Kim Tae-woo & Lim Jeong-hee	Family	Forestella
487	December 26, 2020	2020 Kings of Kings Special	Park Seo-jin	My Mom	Forestella
487	December 26, 2020	2020 Kings of Kings Special	Forestella	We Are the Champions	Forestella
487	December 26, 2020	2020 Kings of Kings Special	Shin Yu	Forgotten Flower	Forestella
487	December 26, 2020	2020 Kings of Kings Special	Hwang Chi-yeul	Lie Lie Lie	Forestella

=== 2021 ===
List of episodes aired in 2021

Singers listed in order of performance.

Episode #	Broadcast Date	Legend or Theme	Guest Singers	Songs	Final Winner (Votes)
488	January 2, 2021	2021 New Year Special: KBS Announcers' Song Festival	Yoon Ji-young & Lee Yu-na	I Knew That I Loved You	Oh Seung-won & Kang Seung-hwa
488	January 2, 2021	2021 New Year Special: KBS Announcers' Song Festival	Kim Sun-geun & YOYOMI	Why Don't You Know?	Oh Seung-won & Kang Seung-hwa
488	January 2, 2021	2021 New Year Special: KBS Announcers' Song Festival	Jang Woong & Kim Ji-ho	Uphill Road	Oh Seung-won & Kang Seung-hwa
488	January 2, 2021	2021 New Year Special: KBS Announcers' Song Festival	Choi Seung-don	Lady in the Rain	Oh Seung-won & Kang Seung-hwa
488	January 2, 2021	2021 New Year Special: KBS Announcers' Song Festival	Oh Seung-won & Kang Seung-hwa	Entertainer	Oh Seung-won & Kang Seung-hwa
488	January 2, 2021	2021 New Year Special: KBS Announcers' Song Festival	Park So-hyun & Kang Sung-gyu	My Ear's Candy	Oh Seung-won & Kang Seung-hwa
488	January 2, 2021	2021 New Year Special: KBS Announcers' Song Festival	Kim Bo-min & Kim Jong-hyun	All For You	Oh Seung-won & Kang Seung-hwa
489	January 9, 2021	Trot Seniors and Juniors Contest	Park Gu-yoon (Team Juniors)	Tears of Mokpo	Team Juniors
489	January 9, 2021	Trot Seniors and Juniors Contest	Woo Yeon-yi (Team Seniors)	Q	Team Juniors
489	January 9, 2021	Trot Seniors and Juniors Contest	Shin Yu (Team Juniors)	Wings	Team Juniors
489	January 9, 2021	Trot Seniors and Juniors Contest	Kim Hye-yeon (with Ahn Ji-hwan) (Team Seniors)	Rose of Sharon	Team Juniors
489	January 9, 2021	Trot Seniors and Juniors Contest	Yoon Soo-hyun (Team Juniors)	Jintobaegi	Team Juniors
489	January 9, 2021	Trot Seniors and Juniors Contest	Kang Jin (Team Seniors)	Emptiness	Team Juniors
490	January 16, 2021	Kim Hyun-sik	Forte di Quattro	Like Rain and Music	Hwang Chi-yeul (with Ham Chun-ho)
490	January 16, 2021	Kim Hyun-sik	Kim Young-heum	Love Love Love	Hwang Chi-yeul (with Ham Chun-ho)
490	January 16, 2021	Kim Hyun-sik	Hwang Chi-yeul (with Ham Chun-ho)	My Love By My Side	Hwang Chi-yeul (with Ham Chun-ho)
490	January 16, 2021	Kim Hyun-sik	Min Woo-hyuk	I Loved You	Hwang Chi-yeul (with Ham Chun-ho)
490	January 16, 2021	Kim Hyun-sik	April 2nd (with Kim Tae-won)	Always You Are by My Side	Hwang Chi-yeul (with Ham Chun-ho)
490	January 16, 2021	Kim Hyun-sik	Kim Jae-hwan	Making Memories	Hwang Chi-yeul (with Ham Chun-ho)
491	January 23, 2021	2021 Fantastic Duet Friends Special	Kim Yong-im & Han Hye-jin	Love	Shin Yu & Kim Yong-jin (Bohemian)
491	January 23, 2021	2021 Fantastic Duet Friends Special	Kim Wan-sun & Kang Sung-yeon	Wind Wind Wind	Shin Yu & Kim Yong-jin (Bohemian)
491	January 23, 2021	2021 Fantastic Duet Friends Special	Ha-eun & Z.flat	Run Across the Sky	Shin Yu & Kim Yong-jin (Bohemian)
491	January 23, 2021	2021 Fantastic Duet Friends Special	Lee Bong-geun & Ahn Ye-eun	Spring Rain	Shin Yu & Kim Yong-jin (Bohemian)
491	January 23, 2021	2021 Fantastic Duet Friends Special	Sleepy & DinDin	I'll Get Over You	Shin Yu & Kim Yong-jin (Bohemian)
491	January 23, 2021	2021 Fantastic Duet Friends Special	Shin Yu & Kim Yong-jin (Bohemian)	Drink Again	Shin Yu & Kim Yong-jin (Bohemian)
492	January 30, 2021	Return of the Queen! Diva Special	Jung Mi-ae	Roundabout Way + It's a Pleasure	Seomoon Tak
492	January 30, 2021	Return of the Queen! Diva Special	Lim Jeong-hee	How Are You	Seomoon Tak
492	January 30, 2021	Return of the Queen! Diva Special	Lee Young-Hyun	Only That Is My World	Seomoon Tak
492	January 30, 2021	Return of the Queen! Diva Special	ALi	Grumble	Seomoon Tak
492	January 30, 2021	Return of the Queen! Diva Special	Pearl	I Will Always Love You	Seomoon Tak
492	January 30, 2021	Return of the Queen! Diva Special	Seomoon Tak	The Power of Love	Seomoon Tak
493	February 6, 2021	Rain	Kim Young-heum	Instead of Saying Goodbye	Ateez
493	February 6, 2021	Rain	Jo Kwon	Bad Guy	Ateez
493	February 6, 2021	Rain	Yoo Hwe-seung (N.Flying)	How to Avoid the Sun	Ateez
493	February 6, 2021	Rain	Lee Chang-min	Rainism	Ateez
493	February 6, 2021	Rain	Jamie	Love Song	Ateez
493	February 6, 2021	Rain	Ateez	It's Raining	Ateez
494	February 13, 2021	Seollal Family Special	Jang Gwang & Mi Ja (Father & Daughter)	Mother to Daughter	Park Hae-mi & Hwang Sung-jae
494	February 13, 2021	Seollal Family Special	Ryu Ji-kwang & Ryu Soon-bong (Son & Father)	Father's Youth	Park Hae-mi & Hwang Sung-jae
494	February 13, 2021	Seollal Family Special	Kim Won-hyo & Shim Jin-hwa (Family)	Only	Park Hae-mi & Hwang Sung-jae
494	February 13, 2021	Seollal Family Special	Choi Jung-won & Yoo-ha (Mother & Daughter)	I Wanna Dance with Somebody (Who Loves Me)	Park Hae-mi & Hwang Sung-jae
494	February 13, 2021	Seollal Family Special	Na Tae-joo & Aunts	What's Wrong With My Age?	Park Hae-mi & Hwang Sung-jae
494	February 13, 2021	Seollal Family Special	Park Hae-mi & Hwang Sung-jae (Mother & Son)	Trust in Me	Park Hae-mi & Hwang Sung-jae
495	February 20, 2021	Song Request of Hope Special	DKB	Escaping the City	Jung Soo-ra
495	February 20, 2021	Song Request of Hope Special	Miraclass	Like the Flame	Jung Soo-ra
495	February 20, 2021	Song Request of Hope Special	Yoon Soo-hyun	Jjiniya	Jung Soo-ra
495	February 20, 2021	Song Request of Hope Special	Jung Soo-ra	Wish	Jung Soo-ra
495	February 20, 2021	Song Request of Hope Special	Yuk Joong-wan Band	Sunny Day	Jung Soo-ra
495	February 20, 2021	Song Request of Hope Special	Hwang Chi-yeul	Dream	Jung Soo-ra
496	February 27, 2021	Song Request of Hope Special	Lee Young-Hyun	Butterfly	Gaho
496	February 27, 2021	Song Request of Hope Special	A.C.E	Full of Happiness	Gaho
496	February 27, 2021	Song Request of Hope Special	Park Seo-jin	Old Hometown Station	Gaho
496	February 27, 2021	Song Request of Hope Special	Kim Jae-hwan	Cherry Blossom Ending	Gaho
496	February 27, 2021	Song Request of Hope Special	Gaho	Fly	Gaho
496	February 27, 2021	Song Request of Hope Special	2F	White Butterfly	Gaho
497	March 6, 2021	6 Singers Sing of Spring in 6 Ways	Shin Yu	Too Far to Be Close to You	Kim Yong-jin (Bohemian)
497	March 6, 2021	6 Singers Sing of Spring in 6 Ways	Gaho	Bounce	Kim Yong-jin (Bohemian)
497	March 6, 2021	6 Singers Sing of Spring in 6 Ways	OnlyOneOf	Spring Day	Kim Yong-jin (Bohemian)
497	March 6, 2021	6 Singers Sing of Spring in 6 Ways	GB9	Don't Forget	Kim Yong-jin (Bohemian)
497	March 6, 2021	6 Singers Sing of Spring in 6 Ways	Jung Dong-ha	Spring Breeze + Cherry Blossom Ending	Kim Yong-jin (Bohemian)
497	March 6, 2021	6 Singers Sing of Spring in 6 Ways	Kim Yong-jin (Bohemian)	It Will Pass	Kim Yong-jin (Bohemian)
498	March 13, 2021	Loving Husbands' Love Songs Special	Park Ji-heon	Meet Him Among Them	Hong Seo-bum
498	March 13, 2021	Loving Husbands' Love Songs Special	Lee Hyun-woo	Kissing a Fool	Hong Seo-bum
498	March 13, 2021	Loving Husbands' Love Songs Special	Kim Jung-min	Seoshi	Hong Seo-bum
498	March 13, 2021	Loving Husbands' Love Songs Special	Hyun Jin-young (with Michelle Lee)	Pierrot Smiles at Us	Hong Seo-bum
498	March 13, 2021	Loving Husbands' Love Songs Special	Hong Seo-bum	Annie's Song	Hong Seo-bum
498	March 13, 2021	Loving Husbands' Love Songs Special	Hong Kyung-min	Apartment	Hong Seo-bum
499	March 20, 2021	500 Episode Special - Trot National Sports Festival Revenge Special	Kim Yong-bin	Spring Days Flit Through My Mind	Jae-ha
499	March 20, 2021	500 Episode Special - Trot National Sports Festival Revenge Special	Oh Yoo-jin	Within 10 Minutes	Jae-ha
499	March 20, 2021	500 Episode Special - Trot National Sports Festival Revenge Special	Shin Seung-tae	I Like You	Jae-ha
499	March 20, 2021	500 Episode Special - Trot National Sports Festival Revenge Special	Jae-ha	Teahouse of the Winter	Jae-ha
499	March 20, 2021	500 Episode Special - Trot National Sports Festival Revenge Special	Kim San-ha	Dear Love	Jae-ha
499	March 20, 2021	500 Episode Special - Trot National Sports Festival Revenge Special	Shin Mi-rae	Binari	Jae-ha
500	March 27, 2021	500 Episode Special - Trot National Sports Festival Revenge Special	Jin Hae-sung	Broken-hearted	Jin Hae-sung
500	March 27, 2021	500 Episode Special - Trot National Sports Festival Revenge Special	Choi Hyang	Because I Am a Man	Jin Hae-sung
500	March 27, 2021	500 Episode Special - Trot National Sports Festival Revenge Special	Han Gang	As You Live	Jin Hae-sung
500	March 27, 2021	500 Episode Special - Trot National Sports Festival Revenge Special	Sang-ho & Sang-min	Napal Baji	Jin Hae-sung
500	March 27, 2021	500 Episode Special - Trot National Sports Festival Revenge Special	Kim Yoon-gil	The Wind Blows	Jin Hae-sung
500	March 27, 2021	500 Episode Special - Trot National Sports Festival Revenge Special	Seol Ha-yoon	The 3rd Hangang Bridge	Jin Hae-sung
501	April 3, 2021	Rockstar Special - The Best Male and Female Rockers Contest	So Chan-whee	Bang Bang Bang	Men's Team
501	April 3, 2021	Rockstar Special - The Best Male and Female Rockers Contest	Crying Nut (with Kingston Rudieska)	Those Rosy Lips	Men's Team
501	April 3, 2021	Rockstar Special - The Best Male and Female Rockers Contest	Seomoon Tak	Desperado	Men's Team
501	April 3, 2021	Rockstar Special - The Best Male and Female Rockers Contest	Monni	Last Concert	Men's Team
501	April 3, 2021	Rockstar Special - The Best Male and Female Rockers Contest	Rumble Fish	The Melancholy of Love	Men's Team
501	April 3, 2021	Rockstar Special - The Best Male and Female Rockers Contest	Kim Kyung-ho	Turn on the Radio Loudly	Men's Team
502	April 10, 2021	Ha Duk-kyu	Park Hak-ki	Love Diary	Shin Seung-tae
502	April 10, 2021	Ha Duk-kyu	Yurisangja	Landscape	Shin Seung-tae
502	April 10, 2021	Ha Duk-kyu	Jeong Se-woon	Good Country	Shin Seung-tae
502	April 10, 2021	Ha Duk-kyu	Park Ki-young	A Thorn Tree	Shin Seung-tae
502	April 10, 2021	Ha Duk-kyu	Shin Seung-tae	Hangyeryong	Shin Seung-tae
502	April 10, 2021	Ha Duk-kyu	Car, the Garden	Cat	Shin Seung-tae
503	April 17, 2021	Trot National Sports Festival: Team Coach vs Team Player	Jo Jung-min	10 Minutes	Team Coach
503	April 17, 2021	Trot National Sports Festival: Team Coach vs Team Player	Seol Ha-yoon	Rose of Betrayal	Team Coach
503	April 17, 2021	Trot National Sports Festival: Team Coach vs Team Player	Hong Kyung-min	Nation of Morning + Arirang	Team Coach
503	April 17, 2021	Trot National Sports Festival: Team Coach vs Team Player	Kim Yoon-gil	As Time Goes By	Team Coach
503	April 17, 2021	Trot National Sports Festival: Team Coach vs Team Player	Jin Shi-mon	No No	Team Coach
503	April 17, 2021	Trot National Sports Festival: Team Coach vs Team Player	Jae-ha	My Love Fades Away	Team Coach
504	April 24, 2021	Trot National Sports Festival: Team Coach vs Team Player	Shin Yu	Lady	Team Coach
504	April 24, 2021	Trot National Sports Festival: Team Coach vs Team Player	Han Gang	Flower Water	Team Coach
504	April 24, 2021	Trot National Sports Festival: Team Coach vs Team Player	Na Tae-joo	Unrequited Love	Team Coach
504	April 24, 2021	Trot National Sports Festival: Team Coach vs Team Player	Sang-ho & Sang-min	Amor Fati	Team Coach
504	April 24, 2021	Trot National Sports Festival: Team Coach vs Team Player	Park Gu-yoon	Thousand Year Stone	Team Coach
504	April 24, 2021	Trot National Sports Festival: Team Coach vs Team Player	Jin Hae-sung	Wild Rose	Team Coach
505	May 1, 2021	Time Travel Special	Brave Girls	Wa	6BAND
505	May 1, 2021	Time Travel Special	Forestella	Scarborough Fair	6BAND
505	May 1, 2021	Time Travel Special	Choi Jung-won & Tiffany Young	Someone to Watch Over Me + Hot Honey Rag	6BAND
505	May 1, 2021	Time Travel Special	Shin Mi-rae	Country Bus Conductor	6BAND
505	May 1, 2021	Time Travel Special	Jin Hae-sung	Foggy Jangchugdan Park	6BAND
505	May 1, 2021	Time Travel Special	6BAND	And Miss You	6BAND
506	May 8, 2021	Parent's Day Special - Songs of Happiness	Baek Il-seob & Baek Seung-woo	Broken Clock	Lee Sang-woo & Lee Do-hoon
506	May 8, 2021	Parent's Day Special - Songs of Happiness	Sang-ho & Sang-min & Lee Woon-woo	Parting at Busan	Lee Sang-woo & Lee Do-hoon
506	May 8, 2021	Parent's Day Special - Songs of Happiness	Bae Ki-sung & Family	No Matter What	Lee Sang-woo & Lee Do-hoon
506	May 8, 2021	Parent's Day Special - Songs of Happiness	Nam Sang-il & Lee Myung-soon	Mother's Love	Lee Sang-woo & Lee Do-hoon
506	May 8, 2021	Parent's Day Special - Songs of Happiness	Im Joo-ri & Jae-ha	Family Portrait	Lee Sang-woo & Lee Do-hoon
506	May 8, 2021	Parent's Day Special - Songs of Happiness	Lee Sang-woo & Lee Do-hoon	Pledge of Love	Lee Sang-woo & Lee Do-hoon
507	May 15, 2021	Singing Comedy Special	Park Seong-ho	SHOW	Kim Tae-won & Lim Jae-baek & Uhm Ji-yoon
507	May 15, 2021	Singing Comedy Special	Yoo Min-sang & Song Yeong-gil & Kim Su-young	Tell Her	Kim Tae-won & Lim Jae-baek & Uhm Ji-yoon
507	May 15, 2021	Singing Comedy Special	Park Joon-hyung & Lim Hyeok-pil	Cranes	Kim Tae-won & Lim Jae-baek & Uhm Ji-yoon
507	May 15, 2021	Singing Comedy Special	Song Joon-geun	Don't Tackle Me	Kim Tae-won & Lim Jae-baek & Uhm Ji-yoon
507	May 15, 2021	Singing Comedy Special	Wink	A Cup of Coffee	Kim Tae-won & Lim Jae-baek & Uhm Ji-yoon
507	May 15, 2021	Singing Comedy Special	Kim Tae-won & Lim Jae-baek & Uhm Ji-yoon	Cheers	Kim Tae-won & Lim Jae-baek & Uhm Ji-yoon
508	May 22, 2021	PSY	Swings	Champion	Ateez
508	May 22, 2021	PSY	Kim Feel	Refuge	Ateez
508	May 22, 2021	PSY	Jessi	I LUV IT	Ateez
508	May 22, 2021	PSY	Ateez	Right Now	Ateez
508	May 22, 2021	PSY	Giriboy & Heize	What Would Have Been	Ateez
509	May 29, 2021	PSY	Choi Jung-hoon (Jannabi)	Father	Lee Hee Moon's OBSG (with Shin Seung-tae)
509	May 29, 2021	PSY	Shin Yong-jae	Delete	Lee Hee Moon's OBSG (with Shin Seung-tae)
509	May 29, 2021	PSY	Lee Seung-yoon	It's Art	Lee Hee Moon's OBSG (with Shin Seung-tae)
509	May 29, 2021	PSY	Lee Hee Moon's OBSG (with Shin Seung-tae)	Napal Baji	Lee Hee Moon's OBSG (with Shin Seung-tae)
509	May 29, 2021	PSY	Se So Neon	Bird	Lee Hee Moon's OBSG (with Shin Seung-tae)
510	June 5, 2021	10th Anniversary Special	Sim Soo-bong	Our Rosy Love + Cry	No winner
510	June 5, 2021	10th Anniversary Special	Jung Dong-ha	Like Rain and Music	No winner
510	June 5, 2021	10th Anniversary Special	Min Woo-hyuk	Departing Ship	No winner
510	June 5, 2021	10th Anniversary Special	Yoon Min-soo & 4MEN	Saldaga	No winner
510	June 5, 2021	10th Anniversary Special	Kim Kyung-ho	Firecracker of Asia	No winner
510	June 5, 2021	10th Anniversary Special	Choi Jung-won & Kim So-hyun	Musical Medley	No winner
511	June 12, 2021	10th Anniversary Special	Hong Kyung-min	The Sun	No winner
511	June 12, 2021	10th Anniversary Special	Jung Soo-ra	Love Poem	No winner
511	June 12, 2021	10th Anniversary Special	Ali	Woman Outside the Window	No winner
511	June 12, 2021	10th Anniversary Special	Hwang Chi-yeul	Because I Love You	No winner
511	June 12, 2021	10th Anniversary Special	Kang Boo-ja & Choi Baek-ho	Autumn Sea, Autumn City + Right	No winner
511	June 12, 2021	10th Anniversary Special	Forestella	Smooth Criminal	No winner
512	June 19, 2021	Artist Couples Special	Miraclass	Dialogue of Love	Son Ho-young
512	June 19, 2021	Artist Couples Special	Shin Seung-tae	A Cup of Makgeolli	Son Ho-young
512	June 19, 2021	Artist Couples Special	Seo J	I Didn't Want Love from You	Son Ho-young
512	June 19, 2021	Artist Couples Special	Son Ho-young	Kimsatgat	Son Ho-young
512	June 19, 2021	Artist Couples Special	Crying Nut	Bumble Bee	Son Ho-young
512	June 19, 2021	Artist Couples Special	Lee Hyun	Smiling Like a Fool	Son Ho-young
513	June 26, 2021	Artist Couples Special	Hwang Chi-yeul	Brush	Na Tae-joo (with Ye Ji-won)
513	June 26, 2021	Artist Couples Special	Shin Yu & Shin Mi-rae	To You, My Love	Na Tae-joo (with Ye Ji-won)
513	June 26, 2021	Artist Couples Special	Cheon Dan Bi	Weeping Willow	Na Tae-joo (with Ye Ji-won)
513	June 26, 2021	Artist Couples Special	AboutU	Where Have You Been	Na Tae-joo (with Ye Ji-won)
513	June 26, 2021	Artist Couples Special	Na Tae-joo (with Ye Ji-won)	A Younger Man	Na Tae-joo (with Ye Ji-won)
513	June 26, 2021	Artist Couples Special	Brave Girls	It's a Fireball	Na Tae-joo (with Ye Ji-won)
514	July 3, 2021	Michael Jackson	Oneus	Thriller	Min Woo-hyuk & Friends
514	July 3, 2021	Michael Jackson	Shin Seung-tae	Billie Jean	Min Woo-hyuk & Friends
514	July 3, 2021	Michael Jackson	Lim Jeong-hee	I'll Be There	Min Woo-hyuk & Friends
514	July 3, 2021	Michael Jackson	Monni	Black or White	Min Woo-hyuk & Friends
514	July 3, 2021	Michael Jackson	Min Woo-hyuk & Friends	Heal the World	Min Woo-hyuk & Friends
514	July 3, 2021	Michael Jackson	Lee Moo-jin	Man in the Mirror	Min Woo-hyuk & Friends
515	July 10, 2021	Summer Special - Top 10 Songs vs Music Bank	WEi	Passion	Lee Chang-min
515	July 10, 2021	Summer Special - Top 10 Songs vs Music Bank	Park Sang-min	You in My Arms	Lee Chang-min
515	July 10, 2021	Summer Special - Top 10 Songs vs Music Bank	Hyun Jin-young	Passion	Lee Chang-min
515	July 10, 2021	Summer Special - Top 10 Songs vs Music Bank	Koh Yoo-jin	Addicted Love	Lee Chang-min
515	July 10, 2021	Summer Special - Top 10 Songs vs Music Bank	Lee Chang-min	Dance with Wolf	Lee Chang-min
515	July 10, 2021	Summer Special - Top 10 Songs vs Music Bank	Lee Ki-chan	I'm Happy	Lee Chang-min
516	July 17, 2021	Summer Special - Top 10 Songs vs Music Bank	Chun Myung-hoon & Noh Yoo Min	Kung Dari Shabara	Koo Jun-yup (with Dawon, Yeonjung and Xitsuh)
516	July 17, 2021	Summer Special - Top 10 Songs vs Music Bank	Hynn	Chenyum	Koo Jun-yup (with Dawon, Yeonjung and Xitsuh)
516	July 17, 2021	Summer Special - Top 10 Songs vs Music Bank	Hong Kyung-min (with Kim Jung-mo)	Ecstatic Confession	Koo Jun-yup (with Dawon, Yeonjung and Xitsuh)
516	July 17, 2021	Summer Special - Top 10 Songs vs Music Bank	Koo Jun-yup (with Dawon, Yeonjung and Xitsuh)	Unreasonable Reason	Koo Jun-yup (with Dawon, Yeonjung and Xitsuh)
516	July 17, 2021	Summer Special - Top 10 Songs vs Music Bank	Jae-ha & Shin Seung-tae	I Miss You	Koo Jun-yup (with Dawon, Yeonjung and Xitsuh)
516	July 17, 2021	Summer Special - Top 10 Songs vs Music Bank	N.Flying	Trip To Myself	Koo Jun-yup (with Dawon, Yeonjung and Xitsuh)
No broadcast of new episodes on July 24 and July 31 due to the live coverage of the 2020 Tokyo Olympics.
517	August 7, 2021	Gummy	Ben	We Should've Been Friends	Soran
517	August 7, 2021	Gummy	Kim Yong-jin (Bohemian)	Amnesia	Soran
517	August 7, 2021	Gummy	Park Jin-joo	You Are My Everything	Soran
517	August 7, 2021	Gummy	Hynn	Moonlight Drawn by Clouds	Soran
517	August 7, 2021	Gummy	Soran	Childish Adult	Soran
517	August 7, 2021	Gummy	Eunkwang (BtoB)	Snowflake	Soran
518	August 14, 2021	Kim Yong-im & Han Hye-jin	Ban Ga-hee	Night of Seoul	Yoo Tae-pyung-yang
518	August 14, 2021	Kim Yong-im & Han Hye-jin	4Men	Brown Recollection	Yoo Tae-pyung-yang
518	August 14, 2021	Kim Yong-im & Han Hye-jin	Outlet	You're My Man	Yoo Tae-pyung-yang
518	August 14, 2021	Kim Yong-im & Han Hye-jin	Seol Ha-yoon	The Rope of Love	Yoo Tae-pyung-yang
518	August 14, 2021	Kim Yong-im & Han Hye-jin	DickPunks	I'm the Youngest Today	Yoo Tae-pyung-yang
518	August 14, 2021	Kim Yong-im & Han Hye-jin	Yoo Tae-pyung-yang	Life Like a Floating Weed	Yoo Tae-pyung-yang
519	August 21, 2021	Korean Sport Stars Special	Lee Bong-ju	Ah! The Good Old Days	Shin Jea-hwan
519	August 21, 2021	Korean Sport Stars Special	Choi Byung-chul	Accidental Encounter	Shin Jea-hwan
519	August 21, 2021	Korean Sport Stars Special	Kim Tae-kyun	A Flying Butterfly	Shin Jea-hwan
519	August 21, 2021	Korean Sport Stars Special	Woo Ji-won & Kim Hoon	The Last Game	Shin Jea-hwan
519	August 21, 2021	Korean Sport Stars Special	Kim Byung-ji	Friend	Shin Jea-hwan
519	August 21, 2021	Korean Sport Stars Special	Shin Jea-hwan	The Rain and You	Shin Jea-hwan
520	August 28, 2021	Jeon In-kwon	Soran	Round and Round and Round	Sunwoo Jung-a
520	August 28, 2021	Jeon In-kwon	Ali	That's My World	Sunwoo Jung-a
520	August 28, 2021	Jeon In-kwon	Car, the Garden	March	Sunwoo Jung-a
520	August 28, 2021	Jeon In-kwon	Forte di Quattro	Train to the World	Sunwoo Jung-a
520	August 28, 2021	Jeon In-kwon	Sunwoo Jung-a	Until Morning Comes	Sunwoo Jung-a
520	August 28, 2021	Jeon In-kwon	Hong Dae-kwang	Oh, You Are a Beautiful Lover	Sunwoo Jung-a
521	September 4, 2021	Jeon In-kwon	Park Wan-kyu	It's Just Love	Im Tae-kyung
521	September 4, 2021	Jeon In-kwon	Ha:tfelt & Hanhae	Please	Im Tae-kyung
521	September 4, 2021	Jeon In-kwon	Song So-hee	Every Day with You	Im Tae-kyung
521	September 4, 2021	Jeon In-kwon	Hong Isaac	Don't You Worry	Im Tae-kyung
521	September 4, 2021	Jeon In-kwon	Im Tae-kyung	After Love	Im Tae-kyung
521	September 4, 2021	Jeon In-kwon	Park Ki-young	As I Live	Im Tae-kyung
522	September 11, 2021	Singing Korean Lyric Songs	Kim So-hyun & Son Jun-ho	Barley Field	Forte di Quattro
522	September 11, 2021	Singing Korean Lyric Songs	Park Ki-young & Hong Jin-ho	One Fine Day in October	Forte di Quattro
522	September 11, 2021	Singing Korean Lyric Songs	Lee Bong-geun	A Wooden Mound Marker	Forte di Quattro
522	September 11, 2021	Singing Korean Lyric Songs	Lee Ji-hye	Bird, Bird, Blue Bird	Forte di Quattro
522	September 11, 2021	Singing Korean Lyric Songs	Choi Sung-bong	A Thousand Winds	Forte di Quattro
522	September 11, 2021	Singing Korean Lyric Songs	Forte di Quattro	Nostalgia	Forte di Quattro
523	September 18, 2021	2021 Chuseok Special - Taekwondo Worldwide	6BAND	Have a Drink	Shin Youngsook
523	September 18, 2021	2021 Chuseok Special - Taekwondo Worldwide	K-Tigers Zero	Red Flavor	Shin Youngsook
523	September 18, 2021	2021 Chuseok Special - Taekwondo Worldwide	WEi	Arirang	Shin Youngsook
523	September 18, 2021	2021 Chuseok Special - Taekwondo Worldwide	Shin Youngsook	Champions	Shin Youngsook
523	September 18, 2021	2021 Chuseok Special - Taekwondo Worldwide	Hong Kyung-min & Seo J	Call the Soul	Shin Youngsook
523	September 18, 2021	2021 Chuseok Special - Taekwondo Worldwide	Park Gu-yoon & Shin Yu	Hometown in My Dreams	Shin Youngsook
524	September 25, 2021	Nam Gook-in & Jung Eun-yi	Jeon Sang-keun	Susanne	Jin Sung
524	September 25, 2021	Nam Gook-in & Jung Eun-yi	Bae Da-hae & Park Kyu-won & Ki Se-joong	Teary Blues	Jin Sung
524	September 25, 2021	Nam Gook-in & Jung Eun-yi	Kang Jin & Kim Hyo-seon	I Like You	Jin Sung
524	September 25, 2021	Nam Gook-in & Jung Eun-yi	So Yul	Street of Love	Jin Sung
524	September 25, 2021	Nam Gook-in & Jung Eun-yi	Jin Sung	Love is the Seed of Tears	Jin Sung
524	September 25, 2021	Nam Gook-in & Jung Eun-yi	Solar	With You	Jin Sung
525	October 2, 2021	Nam Gook-in & Jung Eun-yi	Hong Ja	Lost 30 Years	Ailee
525	October 2, 2021	Nam Gook-in & Jung Eun-yi	LUCY	The Man in Shinsadong	Ailee
525	October 2, 2021	Nam Gook-in & Jung Eun-yi	Norazo	Young	Ailee
525	October 2, 2021	Nam Gook-in & Jung Eun-yi	Tei	Raining Over Yeongdong Bridge	Ailee
525	October 2, 2021	Nam Gook-in & Jung Eun-yi	Ailee	Write to Love With a Pencil	Ailee
525	October 2, 2021	Nam Gook-in & Jung Eun-yi	Monni	I Will Forget	Ailee
526	October 9, 2021	Freelance Announcer Special	Choi Song-hyun	Poison	Choi Eun-kyung
526	October 9, 2021	Freelance Announcer Special	Hwang Soo-kyung	Is Anyone There?	Choi Eun-kyung
526	October 9, 2021	Freelance Announcer Special	Kim Il-joong & Kim Hwan	Shaky Friendship	Choi Eun-kyung
526	October 9, 2021	Freelance Announcer Special	Choi Eun-kyung	Mom in the Garden	Choi Eun-kyung
526	October 9, 2021	Freelance Announcer Special	Lee Jae-yong	Met Her 100m away	Choi Eun-kyung
526	October 9, 2021	Freelance Announcer Special	Lee Ha-jung	Joy	Choi Eun-kyung
527	October 16, 2021	Oh My Star Special	Jung-in & Minseo	Snail	Yoo Hyun-sang & 6BAND
527	October 16, 2021	Oh My Star Special	Nam Sang-il & Kim Da-hyun	Jeongseon Arirang + Magic Lily + Heungtaryeong	Yoo Hyun-sang & 6BAND
527	October 16, 2021	Oh My Star Special	Seomoon Tak & Inseong	Believer	Yoo Hyun-sang & 6BAND
527	October 16, 2021	Oh My Star Special	Byun Jin-sub & Kim Shin-ui	To Be Alone + Rain and You + Shower	Yoo Hyun-sang & 6BAND
527	October 16, 2021	Oh My Star Special	Yoo Hyun-sang & 6BAND	Beautiful Woman + Up in the Sky	Yoo Hyun-sang & 6BAND
527	October 16, 2021	Oh My Star Special	Hyun Jin-young & Na Tae-joo	Weed	Yoo Hyun-sang & 6BAND
528	October 23, 2021	Oh My Star Special	Stephanie & Seol Ha-yoon	Crazy	Choi Jung-won & Shin Young-sook
528	October 23, 2021	Oh My Star Special	Lyn & Kim Jae-Hwan	Only You	Choi Jung-won & Shin Young-sook
528	October 23, 2021	Oh My Star Special	Gummy & Ailee	Growl	Choi Jung-won & Shin Young-sook
528	October 23, 2021	Oh My Star Special	Kim Kyung-ho & Kang Hyung-ho	Wake Up!	Choi Jung-won & Shin Young-sook
528	October 23, 2021	Oh My Star Special	Dynamic Duo & THAMA	Around 30 + Go Back	Choi Jung-won & Shin Young-sook
528	October 23, 2021	Oh My Star Special	Choi Jung-won & Shin Young-sook	Dancing Queen + Everyone	Choi Jung-won & Shin Young-sook
529	October 30, 2021	2021 Talented Actors Special	Kang Shin-il	Spring Days Flit Through My Mind	Choi Dae-chul
529	October 30, 2021	2021 Talented Actors Special	Kim Young-ok	Wild Rose	Choi Dae-chul
529	October 30, 2021	2021 Talented Actors Special	Shin So-yul	Lemon Tree	Choi Dae-chul
529	October 30, 2021	2021 Talented Actors Special	Kim Seung-soo	Unpredictable Life	Choi Dae-chul
529	October 30, 2021	2021 Talented Actors Special	Shin Seung-hwan	Like Rain, Like Music	Choi Dae-chul
529	October 30, 2021	2021 Talented Actors Special	Choi Dae-chul	Gethsemane	Choi Dae-chul
530	November 6, 2021	Vibe	Ben & Hanhae	While Looking at the Picture	Forestella
530	November 6, 2021	Vibe	Ali	Drink Again	Forestella
530	November 6, 2021	Vibe	Nam Woo-hyun	Come Back to Me	Forestella
530	November 6, 2021	Vibe	Lim Jeong-hee & DK	That Man, That Woman	Forestella
530	November 6, 2021	Vibe	Forestella	Saldaga/As We Live	Forestella
530	November 6, 2021	Vibe	Ailee	Love Me Once Again	Forestella
531	November 13, 2021	Legendary MCs Special	Lee Sang-yong	Dear Mother	Lim Baek-chun
531	November 13, 2021	Legendary MCs Special	Lee Sang-byeok	I Hate It	Lim Baek-chun
531	November 13, 2021	Legendary MCs Special	Lee Taek-rim	The Swallow	Lim Baek-chun
531	November 13, 2021	Legendary MCs Special	Lim Baek-chun	Seoul Seoul Seoul	Lim Baek-chun
531	November 13, 2021	Legendary MCs Special	Heo Cham (with Park Dae-bong)	Letter	Lim Baek-chun
532	November 20, 2021	Yoo Hyun-sang	fromis 9	I Don't Know Yet What Love Is	Kim Kyung-ho & Park Wan-kyu
532	November 20, 2021	Yoo Hyun-sang	Jung Dong-ha	Love for Night	Kim Kyung-ho & Park Wan-kyu
532	November 20, 2021	Yoo Hyun-sang	Heo Sol-ji	That's the Reason that Hurt Me	Kim Kyung-ho & Park Wan-kyu
532	November 20, 2021	Yoo Hyun-sang	CRAXILVER	Anxious Heart + Should've Told You	Kim Kyung-ho & Park Wan-kyu
532	November 20, 2021	Yoo Hyun-sang	Park Seo-jin	Woman	Kim Kyung-ho & Park Wan-kyu
532	November 20, 2021	Yoo Hyun-sang	Kim Kyung-ho & Park Wan-kyu	In the Darkness	Kim Kyung-ho & Park Wan-kyu
533	November 27, 2021	Lee Geum-hee	2F	How Can I Love the Heartbreak, You're the One I Love	Lee Jung
533	November 27, 2021	Lee Geum-hee	Park Ki-young & Son Taek-jin	Fate	Lee Jung
533	November 27, 2021	Lee Geum-hee	Nam Hyun-joon & Park Ae-ri	My Forever Friend	Lee Jung
533	November 27, 2021	Lee Geum-hee	Monni	Bounce	Lee Jung
533	November 27, 2021	Lee Geum-hee	Yurisangja	The Meaning of You	Lee Jung
533	November 27, 2021	Lee Geum-hee	Lee Jung	The Moment	Lee Jung
534	December 4, 2021	Lee Geum-hee	Shin Seung-tae	Reason of Existence	Michael K. Lee
534	December 4, 2021	Lee Geum-hee	Yoo Hwe-seung (N.Flying)	Love Always Runs Away	Michael K. Lee
534	December 4, 2021	Lee Geum-hee	Michael K. Lee	Open Arms	Michael K. Lee
534	December 4, 2021	Lee Geum-hee	Laboum	Eternal Love	Michael K. Lee
534	December 4, 2021	Lee Geum-hee	Koh Yoo-jin	I Miss You	Michael K. Lee
534	December 4, 2021	Lee Geum-hee	Ryu Jeong-woon & Park San-hee	Teacup	Michael K. Lee
535	December 11, 2021	Dance with Immortal Songs Special	Everglow & Aura	10 Minutes	Son Ho-young & WetBoy
535	December 11, 2021	Dance with Immortal Songs Special	Hanhae & Prime Kingz Crew	Phone Number	Son Ho-young & WetBoy
535	December 11, 2021	Dance with Immortal Songs Special	Ali & Kardashiba	I Wanna Dance with Somebody	Son Ho-young & WetBoy
535	December 11, 2021	Dance with Immortal Songs Special	J-Black & Mmary	3! 4!	Son Ho-young & WetBoy
535	December 11, 2021	Dance with Immortal Songs Special	Stephanie & Jung Min-chan	Invitation	Son Ho-young & WetBoy
535	December 11, 2021	Dance with Immortal Songs Special	Son Ho-young & WetBoy	Days of Being Brushed by Rain	Son Ho-young & WetBoy
536	December 18, 2021	2021 King of Kings Special	Park Hae-mi & Hwang Sung-jae	Wings	Ailee
536	December 18, 2021	2021 King of Kings Special	Forte di Quattro (Note: with special guest piano performance by Craxilver's Oh Eun-chul)	The Sound of Silence	Ailee
536	December 18, 2021	2021 King of Kings Special	Kim Kyung-ho & Park Wan-kyu	Seoshi	Ailee
536	December 18, 2021	2021 King of Kings Special	Choi Dae-chul	Le Temps des Cathédrales	Ailee
536	December 18, 2021	2021 King of Kings Special	Ailee (Note: with special guest performance by rapper Lee Young-ji)	Bang Bang	Ailee
536	December 18, 2021	2021 King of Kings Special	Monni	Teahouse of the Winter	Ailee
537	December 25, 2021	2021 King of Kings Special	Na Tae-joo (Note: with special guest guitar performance by Kim Jung-mo)	Sparkle Sparkle	Forestella
537	December 25, 2021	2021 King of Kings Special	Forestella	Lazenca, Save Us	Forestella
537	December 25, 2021	2021 King of Kings Special	Lee Jung	Alleyway	Forestella
537	December 25, 2021	2021 King of Kings Special	Ateez	Fantastic Baby & Nillili Mambo	Forestella
537	December 25, 2021	2021 King of Kings Special	Choi Jung-won & Shin Young-sook	One Fine Day in October & Beautiful Country	Forestella
537	December 25, 2021	2021 King of Kings Special	Yoo Hyun-sang & 6BAND	Champion	Forestella

=== 2022 ===
List of episodes aired in 2022

Singers listed in order of performance.

Episode #	Broadcast Date	Legend or Theme	Guest Singers	Songs	Final Winner
538	January 1, 2022	Foreign Stars Singing Korea Special	Abhishek Gupta/Lucky (India)	Rascal (orig. song by Sanulrim)	Soko
538	January 1, 2022	Foreign Stars Singing Korea Special	Christian Burgos (Mexico)	Two-Lane Bridge (OST for Highway Star)	Soko
538	January 1, 2022	Foreign Stars Singing Korea Special	Joel Jay Kim (United States)	Nest (orig. song by Nam Jin)	Soko
538	January 1, 2022	Foreign Stars Singing Korea Special	Romina Follinus (Germany)	Rain Falling in Gomoryeong (orig. song by Hyun-in)	Soko
538	January 1, 2022	Foreign Stars Singing Korea Special	Lara Benito & Saori Fujimoto (Note: her performance was using Korean sign language for the song) (Spain) / (Japan)	Meet Him Among Them (orig. song by Lee Sun-hee)	Soko
538	January 1, 2022	Foreign Stars Singing Korea Special	Soko (Fiji)	Our Stories (remake by Yoon Hyung-joo of traditional Fijian song Isa Lei)	Soko
539	January 8, 2022	Oh My Star Special 2022	Kim Yong-jin (Bohemian) & Gong So-won	Farewell Story (orig. song by Lee Moon-sae ft. Go Eun-hee)	Kwon In-ha & Jung Hong-il
539	January 8, 2022	Oh My Star Special 2022	Bank & Ji-sun (Loveholic)	The Diary of the Day We Broke Up (orig. song by Bank) & Still Beautiful (orig. song by TOY ft. Kim Yeon-woo)	Kwon In-ha & Jung Hong-il
539	January 8, 2022	Oh My Star Special 2022	Shin Hyo-beom & Yoo Hwe-seung (N.Flying)	I'm Sorry (orig. song by Kim Gun-mo)	Kwon In-ha & Jung Hong-il
539	January 8, 2022	Oh My Star Special 2022	Lee Jung & Song I-han	One's Way Back (orig. song by Pak Sun-zoo)	Kwon In-ha & Jung Hong-il
539	January 8, 2022	Oh My Star Special 2022	Kwon In-ha & Jung Hong-il	Invitation to Me (orig. song by Jung Kyung-hwa)	Kwon In-ha & Jung Hong-il
539	January 8, 2022	Oh My Star Special 2022	Jin Sung & Kim Tae-yeon	First Love (orig. song by Jang Yoon-jeong)	Kwon In-ha & Jung Hong-il
540	January 15, 2022	Oh My Star Special 2022	Lee Eun-mi & sEODo Band (Note: with special guest guitar performance by Shin Daechul)	Rhinoceros (orig. song by Han Young-ae)	Lee Eun-mi & sEODo Band
540	January 15, 2022	Oh My Star Special 2022	Lim Jeong-hee & Jo Kwon	Separation in the Daytime (orig. song by Park Jin-young)	Lee Eun-mi & sEODo Band
540	January 15, 2022	Oh My Star Special 2022	Cho Jang-hyuk & Kim Ba-da	Lived Like a Fool (orig. song by Kim Do-hyang)	Lee Eun-mi & sEODo Band
540	January 15, 2022	Oh My Star Special 2022	Michael K. Lee & Min Woo-hyuk	Tonight (orig. song from the musical West Side Story)	Lee Eun-mi & sEODo Band
540	January 15, 2022	Oh My Star Special 2022	Lia Kim & Hyolyn	Chitty Chitty Bang Bang (orig. song by Lee Hyori)	Lee Eun-mi & sEODo Band
540	January 15, 2022	Oh My Star Special 2022	Boohwal & Inseong (SF9)	Making Memories (orig. song by Kim Hyun-sik)	Lee Eun-mi & sEODo Band
541	January 22, 2022	"Today, I'm a Singer" Special	Jung Hyeong-seok	Thought of You (remake by Yeo-jin of orig. song by Roh Young-sim)	Moon Se-yoon
541	January 22, 2022	"Today, I'm a Singer" Special	Seo Jeong-hee	Fate (orig. song by Lee Sun-hee)	Moon Se-yoon
541	January 22, 2022	"Today, I'm a Singer" Special	Oh Jeong-yeon	No No No No No (orig. song by Ha Soo-bin)	Moon Se-yoon
541	January 22, 2022	"Today, I'm a Singer" Special	Hwang Chan-seob	A Glass of Soju (orig. song by Im Chang-jung)	Moon Se-yoon
541	January 22, 2022	"Today, I'm a Singer" Special	Moon Se-yoon	When Love Passes By (orig. song by Lee Moon-sae)	Moon Se-yoon
541	January 22, 2022	"Today, I'm a Singer" Special	Shim Hyung-rae	Help Me Make It Through the Night (orig. song by Kris Kristofferson)	Moon Se-yoon
542	January 29, 2022	Lunar New Year Special: Korean Songs with Choi Bool-am	Hwang Chi-yeul	Ok Kyung (orig. song by Tae Jin-ah)	ALi
542	January 29, 2022	Lunar New Year Special: Korean Songs with Choi Bool-am	Lee Chi-hyun & Choi Sung-soo	Beyond the Blue Horizon (remake by Lou Christie)	ALi
542	January 29, 2022	Lunar New Year Special: Korean Songs with Choi Bool-am	Nam Seung-min	Spring Days Flit Through My Mind (orig. song by Baek Seol-hee)	ALi
542	January 29, 2022	Lunar New Year Special: Korean Songs with Choi Bool-am	Jung Da-kyung	Does Anybody Know This Person? (song used in the KBS 1983 live broadcast Finding Dispersed Families)	ALi
542	January 29, 2022	Lunar New Year Special: Korean Songs with Choi Bool-am	Oneus (Note: with special guest performance by Korean traditional music vocalist Choi Ye-lim)	A Tiger Is Coming (orig. song by Leenalchi)	ALi
543	February 5, 2022	Lunar New Year Special: Korean Songs with Choi Bool-am	KARDI	Tears of Mokpo (orig. song by Lee Nan-young)	ALi
543	February 5, 2022	Lunar New Year Special: Korean Songs with Choi Bool-am	Nam Sang-il & Ahn Ye-eun	Blank Love Letter (orig. song by Choi Sook-ja) & Chupungnyeong (orig. song by Nam Sang-gyu)	ALi
543	February 5, 2022	Lunar New Year Special: Korean Songs with Choi Bool-am	ALi (Note: with special guest performance by Choi Baek-ho)	About Romance (orig. song by Choi Baek-ho)	ALi
543	February 5, 2022	Lunar New Year Special: Korean Songs with Choi Bool-am	Jung Dong-ha	That's My Life Too (orig. song by Cho Yong-pil)	ALi
No broadcast of new episodes on February 12 and February 19 due to the live coverage of the 2022 Winter Olympics.
544	February 26, 2022	Jang Sa-ik	Choi Baek-ho	On The Road (orig. song by Choi Baek-ho)	No Winner
544	February 26, 2022	Jang Sa-ik	Jang Sa-ik & Choi Baek-ho	Spring Days Flit Through My Mind (orig. song by Baek Seol-hee)	No Winner
544	February 26, 2022	Jang Sa-ik	Sohyang	Wind Song (orig. song by Cho Yong-pil)	No Winner
544	February 26, 2022	Jang Sa-ik	Jang Sa-Ik & Sohyang	I Will Give You Everything (orig. song by Lee Jang-hee)	No Winner
545	March 5, 2022	Young Lady and Gentleman Special	Im Ye-jin	I Don't Know Yet (orig. song by Lee Moon-sae)	No Winner
545	March 5, 2022	Young Lady and Gentleman Special	Yoo Jun-seo	Instinctively (orig. song by Kang Seung-yoon)	No Winner
545	March 5, 2022	Young Lady and Gentleman Special	Moon Hee-kyung	Wherever You're Staying (orig. song by Park Kyung-hee)	No Winner
545	March 5, 2022	Young Lady and Gentleman Special	Lee Chan-won	I'm Going To Meet You (orig. song by Lee Chan-won) & Sambaekcho (orig. song by Kim Sang-bae)	No Winner
545	March 5, 2022	Young Lady and Gentleman Special	Yang Byung-yeol & Kim Yi-kyung	Dream (orig. song by Bae Suzy & Baekhyun)	No Winner
545	March 5, 2022	Young Lady and Gentleman Special	Park Ha-na (Note: with special guest performance by Yoo Hwe-seung (N.Flying))	Love Always Runs Away (orig. song by Lee Moon-sae)	No Winner
546	March 12, 2022	Legendary Divas Special	Choi Jin-hee	Farewell (orig. song by Patti Kim)	Hyun Mee
546	March 12, 2022	Legendary Divas Special	Lee Hee-sook	For You (orig. song by Yim Jae-beom)	Hyun Mee
546	March 12, 2022	Legendary Divas Special	Jeong Hoon-hee (Note: with special guest performances by junior singers Joo Chan, Ha Yu-bin, Seo Jung-eun, Song Yu-jin, Meari, Son Dae-hee, Kim Myeong-seob, and Poong Geum and a children's choir performing sign language for the song)	Hand In Hand (orig. song by Koreana)	Hyun Mee
546	March 12, 2022	Legendary Divas Special	Lee Ja-yeon	Never & Tes! (orig. songs by Na Hoon-a)	Hyun Mee
546	March 12, 2022	Legendary Divas Special	Hyun Mee	A Man In A Yellow Shirt (orig. song by Han Myung-sug)	Hyun Mee
547	March 19, 2022	Kim Chang-wan	Choi Jung-hoon (Jannabi)	Long Lost Memories Loom Beyond the Window (orig. song by Sanulrim)	Lee Seung-yoon
547	March 19, 2022	Kim Chang-wan	Jung Dong-ha (Note: with special guest performance by rock band Danggisio)	What Do I Do? (orig. song by Sanulrim)	Lee Seung-yoon
547	March 19, 2022	Kim Chang-wan	Heo Sol-ji	Youth (orig. song by Kim Chang-wan)	Lee Seung-yoon
547	March 19, 2022	Kim Chang-wan	Pentagon (only Jinho, Hongseok, Shinwon, Yuto, and Kino)	Rascal (orig. song by Sanulrim)	Lee Seung-yoon
547	March 19, 2022	Kim Chang-wan	Lee Seung-yoon	Meaning of You (orig. song by Sanulrim)	Lee Seung-yoon
548	March 26, 2022	Kim Chang-wan	Gong So-won	Goodbye (orig. song by Kim Chang-wan)	Kim Jae-hwan & Forestella (Note: 13th tie and 5th joint win in the show's history)
548	March 26, 2022	Kim Chang-wan	Kim Jae-hwan	Reminiscence (orig. song by Sanulrim)	Kim Jae-hwan & Forestella
548	March 26, 2022	Kim Chang-wan	Jambinai	If I Confess, You'll Be Totally Surprised (orig. song by Sanulrim)	Kim Jae-hwan & Forestella
548	March 26, 2022	Kim Chang-wan	Forestella (Note: with special guest performance by dance crew Harmonize)	Laying Silks and Satins on My Heart (orig. song by Sanulrim)	Kim Jae-hwan & Forestella
548	March 26, 2022	Kim Chang-wan	Crying Nut	Let's Ride a Motorcycle with a Guitar (orig. song by Sanulrim)	Kim Jae-hwan & Forestella
549	April 2, 2022	2022 Actors Special	Shim Hyung-tak	Snail (orig. song by Panic)	Im Jae-hyuk
549	April 2, 2022	2022 Actors Special	Park Jae-min	Sunset Glow (orig. song by Lee Moon-sae)	Im Jae-hyuk
549	April 2, 2022	2022 Actors Special	Park Joon-myeon	Who's Your Mama? (orig. song by Park Jin-young ft. Jessi)	Im Jae-hyuk
549	April 2, 2022	2022 Actors Special	Seo Ji-seok	With My Tears (orig. song by Seo Ji-won)	Im Jae-hyuk
549	April 2, 2022	2022 Actors Special	Im Jae-hyuk	Do You Know (orig. song by Jo Sung-mo)	Im Jae-hyuk
549	April 2, 2022	2022 Actors Special	Lee Mi-young	White Butterfly (orig. song by Kim Jung-ho)	Im Jae-hyuk
550	April 9, 2022	"Humor No. 1" Special	Im Ha-ryong	A Schoolbag of Memories (Korean version of Proud Mary by John Fogerty)	Lee Kyung-ae & Lim Mi-suk
550	April 9, 2022	"Humor No. 1" Special	Lee Bong-won	Mother's Love (orig. song by Tae Jin-ah)	Lee Kyung-ae & Lim Mi-suk
550	April 9, 2022	"Humor No. 1" Special	Lee Kyung-ae & Lim Mi-suk	My Forever Friend (orig. song by Na-mi)	Lee Kyung-ae & Lim Mi-suk
550	April 9, 2022	"Humor No. 1" Special	Oh Jae-mi	Back To You Again (orig. song by Byun Jin-sub)	Lee Kyung-ae & Lim Mi-suk
550	April 9, 2022	"Humor No. 1" Special	Shim Hyung-rae	Django (orig. song by The Ventures) & Like Adam and Eve (orig. song by Na Hoon-a)	Lee Kyung-ae & Lim Mi-suk
551	April 16, 2022	Whitney Houston	Park Cho-a	Run to You (orig. song by Whitney Houston)	Lee Young-hyun & Park Min-hye
551	April 16, 2022	Whitney Houston	Seomoon Tak	I Wanna Dance with Somebody (Who Loves Me) (orig. song by Whitney Houston)	Lee Young-hyun & Park Min-hye
551	April 16, 2022	Whitney Houston	Park Ki-young	I Will Always Love You (orig. song by Dolly Parton)	Lee Young-hyun & Park Min-hye
551	April 16, 2022	Whitney Houston	Jeong Young-ju	The Greatest Love of All (orig. song by George Benson)	Lee Young-hyun & Park Min-hye
551	April 16, 2022	Whitney Houston	Stephanie	Queen of the Night (orig. song by Whitney Houston)	Lee Young-hyun & Park Min-hye
551	April 16, 2022	Whitney Houston	Lee Young-hyun & Park Min-hye (Big Mama)	I Have Nothing (orig. song by Whitney Houston)	Lee Young-hyun & Park Min-hye
552	April 23, 2022	Korean Music History Special	Chae Bo-hun	Road (orig. song by g.o.d)	Young Tak
552	April 23, 2022	Korean Music History Special	Hong Kyung-min	First Rain (orig. song by Patti Kim)	Young Tak
552	April 23, 2022	Korean Music History Special	Lee Jung	Foggy Jangchungdan Park (orig. song by Bae Ho)	Young Tak
552	April 23, 2022	Korean Music History Special	Young Tak (Note: with special guest performance by Outsider)	Beautiful Woman (orig. song by Shin Jung Hyun & Yup Juns)	Young Tak
552	April 23, 2022	Korean Music History Special	Cherry Bullet (only Haeyoon, Chaerin and Bora)	Gee (orig. song by Girls' Generation)	Young Tak
553	April 30, 2022	Korean Music History Special	Sohyang & Min Woo-hyuk	Wild Flower (orig. song by Park Hyo-shin)	Choi Jung-hoon (Jannabi)
553	April 30, 2022	Korean Music History Special	Se7en & Park Si-hwan	To You & Anyhow Song (orig. songs by Seo Taiji and Boys)	Choi Jung-hoon (Jannabi)
553	April 30, 2022	Korean Music History Special	MuRR	Fake Love (orig. song by BTS)	Choi Jung-hoon (Jannabi)
553	April 30, 2022	Korean Music History Special	Byul	For A Long Time After That (orig. song by Shin Seung-hun)	Choi Jung-hoon (Jannabi)
553	April 30, 2022	Korean Music History Special	Choi Jung-hoon (Jannabi)	Alleyway (orig. song by Kim Hyun-sik)	Choi Jung-hoon (Jannabi)
554	May 7, 2022	2022 Family Month - The Three Kings Special	The Three Kings (Jang Minho, Young Tak and Lee Chan-won)	Entertainer (orig. song by Psy)	No Winner
554	May 7, 2022	2022 Family Month - The Three Kings Special	Lee Chan-won	Jintobaegi (orig. song by Lee Sung-woo)	No Winner
554	May 7, 2022	2022 Family Month - The Three Kings Special	Jang Minho	Row (orig. song by Jang Minho)	No Winner
554	May 7, 2022	2022 Family Month - The Three Kings Special	The Three Kings	What Are You Doing Here? (orig. song by Young Tak)	No Winner
554	May 7, 2022	2022 Family Month - The Three Kings Special	Jang Minho & Lee Chan-won	I'm the Youngest Today (orig. song by Kim Yong-im)	No Winner
554	May 7, 2022	2022 Family Month - The Three Kings Special	Lee Chan-won	Heartless Blues (orig. song by Kang Seung-mo)	No Winner
554	May 7, 2022	2022 Family Month - The Three Kings Special	Jang Minho & Young Tak	Hit the Jackpot (orig. song by Jang Minho)	No Winner
554	May 7, 2022	2022 Family Month - The Three Kings Special	The Three Kings	Soft Persimmon (orig. song by Na Hoon-a)	No Winner
555	May 14, 2022	2022 Family Month - The Three Kings Special	The Three Kings	Man (orig. song by Na Hoon-a)	No Winner
555	May 14, 2022	2022 Family Month - The Three Kings Special	Jang Minho	The Man Says (orig. song by Jang Minho)	No Winner
555	May 14, 2022	2022 Family Month - The Three Kings Special	Young Tak & Lee Chan-won	Wanna Go Get Some Abalone (orig. song by Young Tak) & Convenience Store (orig. song by Lee Chan-won)	No Winner
555	May 14, 2022	2022 Family Month - The Three Kings Special	Young Tak	The Path I Chose (orig. song by Tak Jae-hoon)	No Winner
555	May 14, 2022	2022 Family Month - The Three Kings Special	Jang Minho	Bling Bling (orig. song by Jang Minho)	No Winner
555	May 14, 2022	2022 Family Month - The Three Kings Special	Lee Chan-won & Young Tak	Your Shampoo Scent in the Flowers (orig. song by Jang Beom-june)	No Winner
555	May 14, 2022	2022 Family Month - The Three Kings Special	The Three Kings	Nest (orig. song by Nam Jin)	No Winner
556	May 21, 2022	Jaurim	Kim Yong-jin (Bohemian)	Nocturne (orig. song by Kim Yoon-ah)	Younha
556	May 21, 2022	Jaurim	Monni (Note: with special guest performance by HerCheck from band SuperKidd)	Magic Carpet Ride (orig. song by Jaurim)	Younha
556	May 21, 2022	Jaurim	KARDI	One Fine Spring Day (orig. song by Kim Yoon-ah)	Younha
556	May 21, 2022	Jaurim	Craxilver	Deviation (orig. song by Jaurim)	Younha
556	May 21, 2022	Jaurim	ALi	Hey, Hey, Hey (orig. song by Jaurim)	Younha
556	May 21, 2022	Jaurim	Younha	25, 21 (orig. song by Jaurim)	Younha
557	May 28, 2022	Legendary Voice Special	Harmonize	Ode to Solo (orig. song by Lee Moon-sae)	La Poem
557	May 28, 2022	Legendary Voice Special	JK Kim Dong-wook & Stella Jang	Say Something (orig. song by A Great Big World)	La Poem
557	May 28, 2022	Legendary Voice Special	Im Chang-jung & Seung Guk-Lee	8282 (orig. song by Davichi)	La Poem
557	May 28, 2022	Legendary Voice Special	Kim So-hyun & Son Jun-ho	Bulinbyeolgok (orig. song by Sumi Jo)	La Poem
557	May 28, 2022	Legendary Voice Special	Kim Yong-jun & Kassy	Western Sky (orig. song by Lee Seung-chul)	La Poem
557	May 28, 2022	Legendary Voice Special	La Poem	Never Ending Story (orig. song by Boohwal)	La Poem
558	June 4, 2022	"New Kids on the Masterpieces" Special	Choi Yeon-woo & Shin Youngsook	I Belong To Me (orig. song from the musical Elisabeth)	Yong Ye-june, Kim Shin-eui & Oh Eun-chul
558	June 4, 2022	"New Kids on the Masterpieces" Special	Lim Seo-won & Seol Ha-yoon	Fantastic (orig. song by Wink)	Yong Ye-june, Kim Shin-eui & Oh Eun-chul
558	June 4, 2022	"New Kids on the Masterpieces" Special	Moon Chae-won (Burvey) & Weeekly	What's Your Name? (orig. song by 4Minute)	Yong Ye-june, Kim Shin-eui & Oh Eun-chul
558	June 4, 2022	"New Kids on the Masterpieces" Special	Jang Tae-hee & 6BAND	Whale Hunting (orig. song by Song Chang-sik)	Yong Ye-june, Kim Shin-eui & Oh Eun-chul
558	June 4, 2022	"New Kids on the Masterpieces" Special	Lee Ji-hoon, Lee Ji-sung & Yu Tae Pyungyang	It's a Fireball (orig. song by Oxen80)	Yong Ye-june, Kim Shin-eui & Oh Eun-chul
558	June 4, 2022	"New Kids on the Masterpieces" Special	Yong Ye-june, Kim Shin-eui (Monni) & Oh Eun-chul (Craxilver)	Music is My Life (orig. song by Lim Jeong-hee)	Yong Ye-june, Kim Shin-eui & Oh Eun-chul
559	June 11, 2022 (Note: with special guest performance by Ji Chang-wook with the song "Laundry")	Lee Juck	Lee Ji-young (Big Mama)	Lie, Lie, Lie (orig. song by Lee Juck)	Huh Gak
559	June 11, 2022	Lee Juck	Parc Jae-jung, Ovan & Piano Man	I Didn't Know Then (orig. song by Lee Juck)	Huh Gak
559	June 11, 2022	Lee Juck	Hanhae & Jeong Se-woon	Left-Handed (orig. song by Panic)	Huh Gak
559	June 11, 2022	Lee Juck	Huh Gak	A Goose's Dream (orig. song by Carnival)	Huh Gak
559	June 11, 2022	Lee Juck	Lee Seung-yoon	Waiting (orig. song by Panic)	Huh Gak
560	June 18, 2022	Lee Juck	Forte di Quattro	The Old Sea In My Drawer (orig. song by Panic)	Kang Seung-yoon
560	June 18, 2022	Lee Juck	Kwak Jin-eon	Snail (orig. song by Panic)	Kang Seung-yoon
560	June 18, 2022	Lee Juck	Choi Jung-in	Running In The Sky (orig. song by Lee Juck)	Kang Seung-yoon
560	June 18, 2022	Lee Juck	Jung Dong-ha	Things We Took For Granted (orig. song by Lee Juck)	Kang Seung-yoon
560	June 18, 2022	Lee Juck	Kang Seung-yoon	Rain (orig. song by Lee Juck)	Kang Seung-yoon
561	June 25, 2022	Baek Ji-young	Kim Ki-tae	I Won't Love (orig. song by Baek Ji-young)	Kim Ki-tae & Seo Eun-kwang (BtoB) (Note: 14th tie, 6th joint win, and 1st all-kill joint win in the show's history)
561	June 25, 2022	Baek Ji-young	Seo Eun-kwang (BtoB)	The Man (OST for Secret Garden)	Kim Ki-tae & Seo Eun-kwang (BtoB)
561	June 25, 2022	Baek Ji-young	Paul Potts & Wan Yi-hwa	Don't Forget (OST for Iris)	Kim Ki-tae & Seo Eun-kwang (BtoB)
561	June 25, 2022	Baek Ji-young	Lee Mu-jin	Dash (orig. song by Baek Ji-young)	Kim Ki-tae & Seo Eun-kwang (BtoB)
561	June 25, 2022	Baek Ji-young	Fromis 9 (except Gyu-ri)	Choice (orig. song by Baek Ji-young)	Kim Ki-tae & Seo Eun-kwang (BtoB)
561	June 25, 2022	Baek Ji-young	KARD	Sad Salsa (orig. song by Baek Ji-young)	Kim Ki-tae & Seo Eun-kwang (BtoB)
562	July 2, 2022	Go-Go 70's Special	Lazybone	My Forever Friend (orig. song by Na-mi)	Ailee & LaChica
562	July 2, 2022	Go-Go 70's Special	Choi Jung-won & Lee Seok-june	The Third Bridge (orig. song by Haeeunlee)	Ailee & LaChica
562	July 2, 2022	Go-Go 70's Special	Ulala Session & DKZ (only Jaechan, Kyoungyoon, Jonghyeong and Mingyu)	Sunny (orig. song by Boney M.)	Ailee & LaChica
562	July 2, 2022	Go-Go 70's Special	Kang Ye-seul, Seol Ha-yoon & Park Seong-yeon	Night Train (orig. song by Lee Eun-ha)	Ailee & LaChica
562	July 2, 2022	Go-Go 70's Special	Ailee & LaChica (except Peanut)	Hot Stuff (orig. song by Donna Summer)	Ailee & LaChica
562	July 2, 2022	Go-Go 70's Special	Stephanie	It's A Lie (orig. song by Kim Choo-ja)	Ailee & LaChica
563	July 9, 2022	King of Kings Special: Non-Singer All-Stars	Kang Boo-ja	My Love Fades Away (orig. song by Lim Hee-sook)	Im Jae-hyuk
563	July 9, 2022	King of Kings Special: Non-Singer All-Stars	Kim Jun-hyun	Alleyway (orig. song by Shinchon Blues)	Im Jae-hyuk
563	July 9, 2022	King of Kings Special: Non-Singer All-Stars	Ahn Se-ha	I Love You (orig. song by Position)	Im Jae-hyuk
563	July 9, 2022	King of Kings Special: Non-Singer All-Stars	Choi Dae-chul	If I Leave (orig. song by Sumi Jo)	Im Jae-hyuk
563	July 9, 2022	King of Kings Special: Non-Singer All-Stars	Im Jae-hyuk	In Dreams (orig. song by Lena Park)	Im Jae-hyuk
563	July 9, 2022	King of Kings Special: Non-Singer All-Stars	Ahn Suk-hwan	Tomorrow (orig. song by Kim Soo-chul)	Im Jae-hyuk
564	July 16, 2022	King of Kings Special: 1st Half of 2022	ALi	It's Love (orig. song by Song Chang-sik)	Kim Jae-hwan
564	July 16, 2022	King of Kings Special: 1st Half of 2022	Kwon In-ha & Jung Hong-il	I Wish Now It Will Be That (orig. song by Cho Yong-pil)	Kim Jae-hwan
564	July 16, 2022	King of Kings Special: 1st Half of 2022	Ailee	That That (orig. song by Psy)	Kim Jae-hwan
564	July 16, 2022	King of Kings Special: 1st Half of 2022	Huh Gak	Love Always Runs Away (orig. song by Lee Moon-sae)	Kim Jae-hwan
564	July 16, 2022	King of Kings Special: 1st Half of 2022	Kim Jae-hwan	As I Told You (orig. song by Kim Sung-jae)	Kim Jae-hwan
565	July 23, 2022	King of Kings Special: 1st Half of 2022	Lee Eun-mi & sEODo Band	Someday, the Boy (orig. song by Kim Feel)	Forestella
565	July 23, 2022	King of Kings Special: 1st Half of 2022	Lee Young-hyun & Park Min-hye (Big Mama)	This is the Moment (orig. song from the musical Jekyll & Hyde)	Forestella
565	July 23, 2022	King of Kings Special: 1st Half of 2022	Kang Seung-yoon	Around 30 (orig. song by Kim Kwang-seok)	Forestella
565	July 23, 2022	King of Kings Special: 1st Half of 2022	La Poem	Everyone (orig. song by Yoon Bok-hee)	Forestella
565	July 23, 2022	King of Kings Special: 1st Half of 2022	Forestella	Bad Romance (orig. song by Lady Gaga)	Forestella
566	July 30, 2022	Summer Special: Immortal Rock Festival in Gangneung	Crying Nut	Circus Magic Clowns, Luxembourg & Speed Up Losers (orig. songs by Crying Nut)	No Winner
566	July 30, 2022	Summer Special: Immortal Rock Festival in Gangneung	6BAND	Let's Go to the Beach, Banana Yum Yum & Please Call Me Oppa (orig. songs by 6BAND)	No Winner
566	July 30, 2022	Summer Special: Immortal Rock Festival in Gangneung	MeloMance	Every Day With You, Love, Maybe & Gift (orig. songs by Deulgukhwa & MeloMance)	No Winner
566	July 30, 2022	Summer Special: Immortal Rock Festival in Gangneung	Kim Chang-wan Band	Meaning of You, Ride a Bike With a Guitar & Don't Leave (orig. songs by Kim Chang-wan Band)	No Winner
566	July 30, 2022	Summer Special: Immortal Rock Festival in Gangneung	YB	I'll Forget You, A Flying Butterfly & I'm Cool (orig. songs by YB)	No Winner
567	August 6, 2022	Summer Special: Immortal Rock Festival in Gangneung	Monni	An Encounter by Chance, Shower & Band Music (orig. songs by Songgolmae & Monni)	No Winner
567	August 6, 2022	Summer Special: Immortal Rock Festival in Gangneung	Monni & 6BAND	March (orig. song by Deulgukhwa)	No Winner
567	August 6, 2022	Summer Special: Immortal Rock Festival in Gangneung	Crying Nut	It's Been A Long Time (orig. song by Love & Peace)	No Winner
567	August 6, 2022	Summer Special: Immortal Rock Festival in Gangneung	Crying Nut & Choi Jung-hoon (Jannabi)	Oh! What A Shiny Night (orig. song by Crying Nut)	No Winner
567	August 6, 2022	Summer Special: Immortal Rock Festival in Gangneung	Choi Jung-hoon (Jannabi)	Beautiful Woman, Did You Ever Love Me?, Legend & For Lovers Who Hesitate (orig. songs by Shin Jung Hyun & Yup Juns & Jannabi)	No Winner
567	August 6, 2022	Summer Special: Immortal Rock Festival in Gangneung	YB & Choi Jung-hoon (Jannabi)	It Must Have Been Love (orig. song by YB)	No Winner
567	August 6, 2022	Summer Special: Immortal Rock Festival in Gangneung	YB	Turn On The Radio Loudly & Hey Sun (orig. songs by Sinawe & Magma)	No Winner
567	August 6, 2022	Summer Special: Immortal Rock Festival in Gangneung	Kim Chang-wan Band	Laying Silk on My Heart, Already Now & What Am I To Do? (orig. songs by Kim Chang-wan Band)	No Winner
568	August 13, 2022	Songgolmae	Park Ki-young	Heenari (orig. song by Koo Chang-mo)	Monni
568	August 13, 2022	Songgolmae	Moon Su-jin	Love, the Beautiful and Precious Stories (orig. song by Bae Cheol-soo)	Monni
568	August 13, 2022	Songgolmae	La Poem	I Will Be a Bird and Fly (orig. song by Songgolmae)	Monni
568	August 13, 2022	Songgolmae	Kim Young-ho & LEENU	I Will Love Everything (orig. song by Songgolmae)	Monni
568	August 13, 2022	Songgolmae	Monni	Everything in This World (orig. song by Songgolmae)	Monni
569	August 20, 2022	Songgolmae	Boohwal	Wandering (orig. song by Koo Chang-mo)	SGO
569	August 20, 2022	Songgolmae	Nicole Jung	Moment Seeing First Time (orig. song by Songgolmae)	SGO
569	August 20, 2022	Songgolmae	Shin Seung-tae	Lived Without Knowing the World (orig. song by Runway)	SGO
569	August 20, 2022	Songgolmae	Sageori Geu Oppa (SGO)	Gather Around (orig. song by Songgolmae)	SGO
569	August 20, 2022	Songgolmae	Kim Ho-young (actor)	An Encounter by Chance (orig. song by Songgolmae)	SGO
570	August 27, 2022	Miss Korea Special	Hong Yeo-jin	Song of Hope (orig. song by Chae Kyu-yeop)	Kwon Jung-joo & Kim Ji-soo
570	August 27, 2022	Miss Korea Special	Lee Ji-ann	Turning the Pages of Memories (orig. song by Lee Sun-hee)	Kwon Jung-joo & Kim Ji-soo
570	August 27, 2022	Miss Korea Special	Seo Hyun-jin	Miss Korea (orig. song by Lee Hyori)	Kwon Jung-joo & Kim Ji-soo
570	August 27, 2022	Miss Korea Special	Sul Su-jin & Sul Su-hyun	Don't Forget Me (orig. song by Baek Ji-young)	Kwon Jung-joo & Kim Ji-soo
570	August 27, 2022	Miss Korea Special	Kwon Jung-joo & Kim Ji-soo	Father (orig. song by Insooni)	Kwon Jung-joo & Kim Ji-soo
570	August 27, 2022	Miss Korea Special	Kwon Min-jung	Rose of Betrayal (orig. song by Uhm Jung-hwa)	Kwon Jung-joo & Kim Ji-soo
571	September 3, 2022	Yim Jae-beom	Im Tae-kyung	Stigma (orig. song by Yim Jae-beom)	Seomoon Tak
571	September 3, 2022	Yim Jae-beom	Seomoon Tak	The Flight (orig. song by Yim Jae-beom)	Seomoon Tak
571	September 3, 2022	Yim Jae-beom	U Sung-eun & Louie	After the Night (orig. song by Yim Jae-beom)	Seomoon Tak
571	September 3, 2022	Yim Jae-beom	Lee So-jung	Where Are You? (orig. song by Yim Jae-beom)	Seomoon Tak
571	September 3, 2022	Yim Jae-beom	Kim Ki-tae	I Am a Candlelight Before You (orig. song by Sinawe)	Seomoon Tak
572	September 10, 2022	Yim Jae-beom	Hwang Chi-yeul & Kim Chang-yeon	For You (orig. song by Yim Jae-beom)	Jung Hong-il
572	September 10, 2022	Yim Jae-beom	Lee Jung	Love (orig. song by Yim Jae-beom)	Jung Hong-il
572	September 10, 2022	Yim Jae-beom	Jung Hong-il	Turn on the Radio Loudly (orig. song by Sinawe)	Jung Hong-il
572	September 10, 2022	Yim Jae-beom	Kim Jae-hwan	Confession (orig. song by Yim Jae-beom)	Jung Hong-il
573	September 17, 2022	Drama OSTs Vocal Queens Special	Sunye	I Will Go to You Like the First Snow (OST for Guardian: The Lonely and Great God)	Ailee
573	September 17, 2022	Drama OSTs Vocal Queens Special	Lee Bo-ram	Forever (OST for Star in My Heart)	Ailee
573	September 17, 2022	Drama OSTs Vocal Queens Special	Bada	Foolish Love (OST for A Man in Crisis)	Ailee
573	September 17, 2022	Drama OSTs Vocal Queens Special	Ailee	Love Always Runs Away (OST for Young Lady and Gentleman)	Ailee
573	September 17, 2022	Drama OSTs Vocal Queens Special	Lim Jeong-hee	Love, Maybe (OST for Business Proposal)	Ailee
573	September 17, 2022	Drama OSTs Vocal Queens Special	Park Min-hye (Big Mama)	One and Only (OST for The King's Affection)	Ailee
574	September 24, 2022	Haeeunlee	Hong Isaac	You Wouldn't Know (orig. song by Haeeunlee)	Jeong Young-ju
574	September 24, 2022	Haeeunlee	Na Tae-ju	Third Han River Bridge (orig. song by Haeeunlee)	Jeong Young-ju
574	September 24, 2022	Haeeunlee	Jung Da-kyung	I Really Really Like You (orig. song by Haeeunlee)	Jeong Young-ju
574	September 24, 2022	Haeeunlee	Shin Seung-tae	Monologue (orig. song by Haeeunlee)	Jeong Young-ju
574	September 24, 2022	Haeeunlee	Jeong Young-ju	Passion (orig. song by Haeeunlee)	Jeong Young-ju
574	September 24, 2022	Haeeunlee	Soran	Daybreak Rain (orig. song by Haeeunlee)	Jeong Young-ju
575	October 1, 2022	Armed Forces Day Special	Jung Sung-hwa	Hero (orig. song from the musical Hero)	No Winner
575	October 1, 2022	Armed Forces Day Special	La Poem	A Wooden Mound Marker (orig. song by Han Myung-hee)	No Winner
575	October 1, 2022	Armed Forces Day Special	Jeong Sun-ah	Beautiful Country (orig. song by Moony)	No Winner
575	October 1, 2022	Armed Forces Day Special	Day6 (Even of Day)	Time of Our Life & On the Train to the Army (orig. songs by Day6 and Kim Min-woo)	No Winner
575	October 1, 2022	Armed Forces Day Special	Jo Hwan-ji	This is the Moment (orig. song from the musical Jekyll & Hyde)	No Winner
575	October 1, 2022	Armed Forces Day Special	Brave Girls	Rollin' (orig. song by Brave Girls)	No Winner
575	October 1, 2022	Armed Forces Day Special	Viviz	BOP BOP! (orig. song by Viviz)	No Winner
575	October 1, 2022	Armed Forces Day Special	Park Goon, Jeong Hae-cheol & Lee Jin-bong	Real Man, We Go to the Front & Cool Man (military songs medley)	No Winner
575	October 1, 2022	Armed Forces Day Special	ALi	365 Days (orig. song by Song I-han)	No Winner
575	October 1, 2022	Armed Forces Day Special	Choi Jung-in	Uphill Road (orig. song by Choi Jung-in)	No Winner
575	October 1, 2022	Armed Forces Day Special	SSaW	Spring, Summer, Autumn, Winter & Bravo, My Life (orig. songs by SSaW)	No Winner
575	October 1, 2022	Armed Forces Day Special	Psy	Entertainer, That That & It's Art (orig. songs by Psy)	No Winner
576	October 8, 2022	Friends Special	Kino (Pentagon) & Woodz	Honey (orig. song by Park Jin-young)	Stephanie & Lisa
576	October 8, 2022	Friends Special	Lee Byeong-chan & Park Jang-hyun	Again (orig. song by Byun Jin-sub)	Stephanie & Lisa
576	October 8, 2022	Friends Special	Park Joon-hyung & Park Wan-kyu	Thick Lipstick (orig. song by Lim Ju-ri)	Stephanie & Lisa
576	October 8, 2022	Friends Special	Taeil (Block B) & Maddox	Holding on to the End of Tonight (orig. song by Solid)	Stephanie & Lisa
576	October 8, 2022	Friends Special	Stephanie & Lisa	Don't Touch Me (orig. song by Ailee)	Stephanie & Lisa
577	October 15, 2022	Friends Special	Yang Dong-geun & Rhythm Power	I Wanna (Drop It Like It's Hot!) (orig. song by DJ DOC)	Hwanhee & Greg
577	October 15, 2022	Friends Special	Shin Seung-tae & Lee Mi-ri	Whale Hunting (orig. song by Song Chang-sik)	Hwanhee & Greg
577	October 15, 2022	Friends Special	Kim Ki-tae & Yun Seong	Shout Myself (orig. song by Maya)	Hwanhee & Greg
577	October 15, 2022	Friends Special	Hwanhee & Greg	Hello (orig. song by Adele)	Hwanhee & Greg
577	October 15, 2022	Friends Special	Lee Chan-won & Hwang Yun-sung	I Really Liked It (orig. song by Joo Hyun-mi)	Hwanhee & Greg
578	October 22, 2022	K-POP Special	Kim Ki-tae	Maria (orig. song by Hwasa)	Lee Ji-hoon
578	October 22, 2022	K-POP Special	Woodz	Rain and You (orig. song by Park Joong-hoon)	Lee Ji-hoon
578	October 22, 2022	K-POP Special	Wendy (Red Velvet)	Living In The Same Time (orig. song by Naul)	Lee Ji-hoon
578	October 22, 2022	K-POP Special	Lee Ji-hoon	Jasmine (orig. song by Lee Seung-chul)	Lee Ji-hoon
578	October 22, 2022	K-POP Special	Monni	No. 1 (orig. song by BoA)	Lee Ji-hoon
579	October 29, 2022	K-POP Special	Ghost9	Heartbeat (orig. song by 2PM)	Parc Jae-jung
579	October 29, 2022	K-POP Special	Flower	Train to the World (orig. song by Deulgukhwa)	Parc Jae-jung
579	October 29, 2022	K-POP Special	Kahi	As the Night Goes On & Come Back Home (orig. songs by Seo Taiji and Boys)	Parc Jae-jung
579	October 29, 2022	K-POP Special	KCM	I Can't Have You (orig. song by Bank)	Parc Jae-jung
579	October 29, 2022	K-POP Special	Parc Jae-jung	Thanks (orig. song by Kim Dong-ryul)	Parc Jae-jung
No broadcast on November 5 due to the period of national mourning after the Seoul Halloween crowd crush.
580	November 12, 2022	Autumn Special: Immortal Romantic Holiday	Jo Sung-mo	Do You Know (orig. song by Jo Sung-mo)	No Winner
580	November 12, 2022	Autumn Special: Immortal Romantic Holiday	Lee Young-hyun (Big Mama)	Resignation (orig. song by Lee Young-hyun)	No Winner
580	November 12, 2022	Autumn Special: Immortal Romantic Holiday	Bobby Kim	That Thing Called Love (orig. song by Bobby Kim)	No Winner
580	November 12, 2022	Autumn Special: Immortal Romantic Holiday	Ha Dong Qn	A Letter to a Cloudy Fall Sky, Please Love Her & From Mark (orig. songs by Kim Kwang-seok & Ha Dong Qn)	No Winner
580	November 12, 2022	Autumn Special: Immortal Romantic Holiday	Jo Sung-mo & Hwang Chi-yeul	I Swear (orig. song by Jo Sung-mo)	No Winner
580	November 12, 2022	Autumn Special: Immortal Romantic Holiday	Jannabi	Summer & A Thought on an Autumn Night (orig. songs by Jannabi)	No Winner
580	November 12, 2022	Autumn Special: Immortal Romantic Holiday	Gummy & Jannabi	Whistle (orig. song by Lee Moon-sae)	No Winner
580	November 12, 2022	Autumn Special: Immortal Romantic Holiday	Kim Ho-joong	Brucia La Terra & Il Mare Calmo Della Sera (OST for The Godfather Part III & orig. song by Andrea Bocelli)	No Winner
581	November 19, 2022	Autumn Special: Immortal Romantic Holiday	Hwang Chi-yeul	Why & A Daily Song (orig. songs by Hwang Chi-yeul)	No Winner
581	November 19, 2022	Autumn Special: Immortal Romantic Holiday	Jannabi	She & Reality (orig. songs by Jannabi & Richard Sanderson)	No Winner
581	November 19, 2022	Autumn Special: Immortal Romantic Holiday	Bobby Kim	My Girl (orig. song by The Temptations)	No Winner
581	November 19, 2022	Autumn Special: Immortal Romantic Holiday	Lee Young-hyun	The Winner Takes It All (orig. song by ABBA)	No Winner
581	November 19, 2022	Autumn Special: Immortal Romantic Holiday	Bobby Kim & Jannabi	Because I Love You (orig. song by Yoo Jae-ha)	No Winner
581	November 19, 2022	Autumn Special: Immortal Romantic Holiday	Ha Dong Qn	My Love by My Side (orig. song by Kim Hyun-sik)	No Winner
581	November 19, 2022	Autumn Special: Immortal Romantic Holiday	Lee Young-hyun	Butterfly (orig. song by Loveholics)	No Winner
581	November 19, 2022	Autumn Special: Immortal Romantic Holiday	Gummy	Childish Adult & You Are My Everything (orig. song by Gummy and OST for Descendants of the Sun)	No Winner
581	November 19, 2022	Autumn Special: Immortal Romantic Holiday	Kim Ho-joong	One Million Roses & Meet Him Among Them (orig. songs by Sim Soo-bong and Lee Sun-hee)	No Winner
581	November 19, 2022	Autumn Special: Immortal Romantic Holiday	Jo Sung-mo	A Thorn Tree & To Your Side (orig. songs by Siinkwa Chonjang and Jo Sung-mo)	No Winner
582	November 26, 2022	Patti Kim	Park Min-hye (Big Mama)	First Rain (orig. song by Patti Kim)	Kim Ki-tae
582	November 26, 2022	Patti Kim	Park Ki-young	Love That Left Autumn (orig. song by Patti Kim)	Kim Ki-tae
582	November 26, 2022	Patti Kim	CSR	Sarang (orig. song by Patti Kim)	Kim Ki-tae
582	November 26, 2022	Patti Kim	Kim Ki-tae	Farewell (orig. song by Patti Kim)	Kim Ki-tae
582	November 26, 2022	Patti Kim	Jo Myeong-seop	Love, Once Again (orig. song by Patti Kim)	Kim Ki-tae
583 (Note: with special guest appearance by Lee Sun-hee)	December 3, 2022	Patti Kim	AUX	Love Forever (orig. song by Patti Kim)	Hwang Chi-yeul
583	December 3, 2022	Patti Kim	Lee Byeong-chan	The Thorn Birds (orig. song by Patti Kim)	Hwang Chi-yeul
583	December 3, 2022	Patti Kim	DKZ (except Munik)	Can't Live Without You (orig. song by Patti Kim)	Hwang Chi-yeul
583	December 3, 2022	Patti Kim	Stephanie & Waackxxxy	Hymn of Seoul (orig. song by Patti Kim)	Hwang Chi-yeul
583	December 3, 2022	Patti Kim	Hwang Chi-yeul	I Can't Forget (orig. song by Patti Kim)	Hwang Chi-yeul
584	December 10, 2022	Patti Kim	Forestella	Vow of Love (orig. song by Patti Kim)	Ock Joo-hyun
584	December 10, 2022	Patti Kim	Seo J	Light and Shadow (orig. song by Patti Kim)	Ock Joo-hyun
584	December 10, 2022	Patti Kim	Xdinary Heroes	Seoul's Maternal Love (orig. song by Patti Kim)	Ock Joo-hyun
584	December 10, 2022	Patti Kim	Ock Joo-hyun	Love is the Flower of Life (orig. song by Patti Kim)	Ock Joo-hyun
585	December 17, 2022	Johan Kim	Maddox	Sorry for the Late Love (orig. song by Johan Kim)	Soran
585	December 17, 2022	Johan Kim	U Sung-eun, Giant Pink & Kisum	My Only Friend (orig. song by Solid)	Soran
585	December 17, 2022	Johan Kim	Hwanhee	Holding on to the End of Tonight (orig. song by Solid)	Soran
585	December 17, 2022	Johan Kim	Soran	You Are My Girl (orig. song by Johan Kim)	Soran
585	December 17, 2022	Johan Kim	UV	Soulmates (orig. song by Solid)	Soran
585	December 17, 2022	Johan Kim	Hong Dae-kwang	I Want To Fall In Love (orig. song by Johan Kim)	Soran
586	December 24, 2022	2022 King of Kings Special	Jung Hong-il	Ah! It Is Ancient Times (orig. song by Lee Sun-hee)	Forestella
586	December 24, 2022	2022 King of Kings Special	Monni & Oh Eun-chul (Craxilver)	Maria (remake by Kim Ah-joong of orig. song by Blondie)	Forestella
586	December 24, 2022	2022 King of Kings Special	Forestella	Mama (orig. song by Exo-K)	Forestella
586	December 24, 2022	2022 King of Kings Special	Stephanie	Abracadabra (orig. song by Brown Eyed Girls)	Forestella
586	December 24, 2022	2022 King of Kings Special	Hwanhee	For You (orig. song by Yim Jae-beom)	Forestella
587	December 31, 2022	2022 King of Kings Special	Ock Joo-hyun	Dear Name (orig. song by IU)	Kim Ki-tae & Seo Eun-kwang (BtoB)
587	December 31, 2022	2022 King of Kings Special	Kim Jae-hwan	Rain and You (orig. song by Park Joong-hoon)	Kim Ki-tae & Seo Eun-kwang (BtoB)
587	December 31, 2022	2022 King of Kings Special	Ailee	A Flying Butterfly (orig. song by YB)	Kim Ki-tae & Seo Eun-kwang (BtoB)
587	December 31, 2022	2022 King of Kings Special	Soran	Don't Leave Me (orig. song by Park Jin-young)	Kim Ki-tae & Seo Eun-kwang (BtoB)
587	December 31, 2022	2022 King of Kings Special	Kim Ki-tae & Seo Eun-kwang (BtoB)	Fate (orig. song by Lee Sun-hee)	Kim Ki-tae & Seo Eun-kwang (BtoB)

=== 2023 ===
List of episodes aired in 2023

Singers listed in order of performance.

Episode #	Broadcast Date	Legend or Theme	Guest Singers	Songs	Final Winner
588	January 7, 2023	Audition Star Families	Kim Tae-yeon & her mother	Maternal Love (orig. song by Lee Mi-ja)	Park Chang-geun & his brother
588	January 7, 2023	Audition Star Families	Oh Yoo-jin & her grandmother	Broken Clock (orig. song by Na Huna)	Park Chang-geun & his brother
588	January 7, 2023	Audition Star Families	Shin Seung-tae & his father	Wish (orig. song by Noh Sa-yeon)	Park Chang-geun & his brother
588	January 7, 2023	Audition Star Families	Hong Ji-yun & her sister Hong Ju-hyun	Lie on the Sea (orig. song by The Treble Clef)	Park Chang-geun & his brother
588	January 7, 2023	Audition Star Families	Park Chang-geun & his brother	Becoming Dust (orig. song by Kim Kwang-seok)	Park Chang-geun & his brother
589	January 14, 2023	Kim Yon-ja	Tempest	Nation of Morning (orig. song by Kim Yon-ja)	Bada
589	January 14, 2023	Kim Yon-ja	Swan (Purple Kiss)	Bling Bling (orig. song by Kim Yon-ja)	Bada
589	January 14, 2023	Kim Yon-ja	Bada	Amor Fati (orig. song by Kim Yon-ja)	Bada
589	January 14, 2023	Kim Yon-ja	ALi (Note: with special guest performance by Korean duo Am:Pm, produced by ALi)	Mercury Lamp (orig. song by Kim Yon-ja)	Bada
589	January 14, 2023	Kim Yon-ja	6BAND	Within 10 Minutes (orig. song by Kim Yon-ja)	Bada
589	January 14, 2023	Kim Yon-ja	Yang Ji-eun	Is It True (orig. song by Kim Yon-ja)	Bada
590 (Note: special rules for this episode include 3 teams of 2 singers who will sing verse 1 vs. verse 2 of the same song, each match winner gets to keep Jang Yoon-jeong's song as her own with the score system returning for this episode with a max of 500 points per match) (Note: with special guest performances by Kim Hee-jae and by Na Tae-ju)	January 21, 2023	Re:Play Jang Yoon-jeong	Match 1: Kim Na-hee vs. Kwak Ji-eun	Memory (orig. song by Jang Yoon-jeong)	Kwak Ji-eun (288 points); Yang Ji-eun (251 points); Hwang Woo-lim (252 points)
590	January 21, 2023	Re:Play Jang Yoon-jeong	Match 2: Yang Ji-eun vs. Hae-soo	Cried My Heart (orig. song by Jang Yoon-jeong)	Kwak Ji-eun (288 points); Yang Ji-eun (251 points); Hwang Woo-lim (252 points)
590	January 21, 2023	Re:Play Jang Yoon-jeong	Match 3: Hwang Woo-lim vs. Huh Chan-mi	Stockings (orig. song by Jang Yoon-jeong)	Kwak Ji-eun (288 points); Yang Ji-eun (251 points); Hwang Woo-lim (252 points)
591	January 28, 2023	Celestial Queens of High Notes	Jinju	Everyone (orig. song by Yoon Bok-hee)	Yun Seong
591	January 28, 2023	Celestial Queens of High Notes	Shin Young-sook	A Goose's Dream (orig. song by Insooni)	Yun Seong
591	January 28, 2023	Celestial Queens of High Notes	Bada	Maria (remake by Kim Ah-joong of orig. song by Blondie)	Yun Seong
591	January 28, 2023	Celestial Queens of High Notes	Yun Seong	Love of a Thousand Years (orig. song by Park Wan-kyu)	Yun Seong
591	January 28, 2023	Celestial Queens of High Notes	Park Min-hye (Big Mama)	Good Day (orig. song by IU)	Yun Seong
591	January 28, 2023	Celestial Queens of High Notes	Lee Bo-ram	If I Leave (orig. song by Sumi Jo)	Yun Seong
592	February 4, 2023	Oh My Star Special #3	Kim Johan & UV	End of the Road (orig. song by Boyz II Men)	Jeong Sun-ah & Min Woo-hyuk
592	February 4, 2023	Oh My Star Special #3	Sunye & Jo Kwon	Memory of the Wind (orig. song by Naul)	Jeong Sun-ah & Min Woo-hyuk
592	February 4, 2023	Oh My Star Special #3	Park Wan-kyu & Yun Seong	The Shining Light in that Flower (orig. song by Park Kyung-hee)	Jeong Sun-ah & Min Woo-hyuk
592	February 4, 2023	Oh My Star Special #3	Lee Bo-ram & Hynn	Wind Song (orig. song by Cho Yong-pil)	Jeong Sun-ah & Min Woo-hyuk
592	February 4, 2023	Oh My Star Special #3	Jeong Sun-ah & Min Woo-hyuk (Note: with special guest performance by dance crew Harmonize)	This is Me (Korean version of OST by Keala Settle for The Greatest Showman)	Jeong Sun-ah & Min Woo-hyuk
593	February 11, 2023	Oh My Star Special #3	Yoon Hyung-joo & Yurisangja	Wedding Cake & Our Stories (orig. songs by Twin Folio and Yoon Hyung-joo)	Kim Ho-joong & Espero
593	February 11, 2023	Oh My Star Special #3	Nam Sang-il & Shin Seung-tae	Give Me Back My Youth (orig. song by Na Huna)	Kim Ho-joong & Espero
593	February 11, 2023	Oh My Star Special #3	Hong Jin-young & Park Kwang-sun	Flew Over the Cuckoo's Nest (orig. song by Kim Gun-mo)	Kim Ho-joong & Espero
593	February 11, 2023	Oh My Star Special #3	Kim Young-im & Yang Ji-eun	Jeongseon Arirang & Parting (orig. songs by Kim Young-im and Kim Soo-chul)	Kim Ho-joong & Espero
593	February 11, 2023	Oh My Star Special #3	Kim Ho-joong & Espero	Western Sky (orig. song by Lee Seung-chul)	Kim Ho-joong & Espero
594	February 18, 2023	late Park Gun-ho	Ryu Seung-joo	We Broke Up Too Easily (orig. song by Choi Jin-hee)	Na Tae-joo
594	February 18, 2023	late Park Gun-ho	Jung Dong-ha	Sad Fate (adapted by Na-mi of orig. song by Yukio Hashi)	Na Tae-joo
594	February 18, 2023	late Park Gun-ho	Lee Chang-min, Kim Chan-ho & Seo Dong-jin	Last Night Story (orig. song by Sobangcha)	Na Tae-joo
594	February 18, 2023	late Park Gun-ho	Na Tae-joo	Saturday Night Fever (orig. song by Kim Jong-chan)	Na Tae-joo
594	February 18, 2023	late Park Gun-ho	Jung Da-kyung	Chalrang, Chalrang (orig. song by Lee Ja-yeon)	Na Tae-joo
595	February 25, 2023	late Park Gun-ho	Purple Kiss	Round and Round (orig. song by Na-mi)	Bada
595	February 25, 2023	late Park Gun-ho	Bada	You Are a Rose (orig. song by Min Hae-kyung)	Bada
595	February 25, 2023	late Park Gun-ho	La Poem	Heartless Blues (orig. song by Kang Seung-mo)	Bada
595	February 25, 2023	late Park Gun-ho	Hong Jin-young	Joy (orig. song by Jung Su-ra)	Bada
595	February 25, 2023	late Park Gun-ho	Kim Ki-tae	Forgotten Season (orig. song by Lee Yong)	Bada
596	March 4, 2023	KBS 50th Anniversary Special	Song So-hee (Keyword: "Ding, Dong, Dang" for Korea Sings)	Journey to Utopia (orig. song by Song So-hee based on Monggeumpo Taryeong)	No Winner
596	March 4, 2023	KBS 50th Anniversary Special	Sul Woon-do & Lee Chan-won (Keyword: "Does Anybody Know This Person?" for Finding Dispersed Families)	Lost 30 Years & Purple Postcard (orig. songs by Sul Woon-do)	No Winner
596	March 4, 2023	KBS 50th Anniversary Special	Cho Hang-jo (Keyword: "65.8%" for First Love)	Reason of Existence & Love and Life (OSTs by Kim Jong-hwan and Cho Hang-jo for First Love and Wang's Family)	No Winner
596	March 4, 2023	KBS 50th Anniversary Special	Jang Min-ho (Keyword: "Faraway Hometown" for Gayo Stage)	Faraway Hometown (remake by Na Huna of orig. song by Yoo Ji-sung)	No Winner
596	March 4, 2023	KBS 50th Anniversary Special	Shim Hyung-rae (Keyword: "The People Who Makes Us Happy" for Gag Concert) (Note: with special guest performances by comedians Kim Won-hyo, Kim Tae-won, Lim Jae-baek, Kim Won-hoon and Cho Jin-se)	Guitar Man & Your Cheatin' Heart (orig. songs by The Ventures and Hank Williams)	No Winner
596	March 4, 2023	KBS 50th Anniversary Special	Lee Ae-sook, Choi Jung-won, Shin Young-sook, Son Jun-ho & Min Woo-hyuk (Keyword: "Hand in Hand" for the 1988 Summer Olympics)	Nation of Morning & Hand in Hand (orig. songs by Kim Yon-ja & Koreana)	No Winner
597	March 11, 2023	YB	sEODo Band	Tal Dance (remake by YB of orig. song by Runway)	Kim Jae-hwan
597	March 11, 2023	YB	DKZ (only Jaechan, Kyoungyoon, Jonghyeong and Mingyu)	What Am I To Do? (remake by YB of orig. song by Sand Pebbles)	Kim Jae-hwan
597	March 11, 2023	YB	Touched	It's a Fireball (remake by YB of orig. song by Oxen'80)	Kim Jae-hwan
597	March 11, 2023	YB	Kim Ki-tae (Note: with special guest performance by Jeon In-kwon)	Only That Is My World (remake by YB of orig. song by Deulgukhwa)	Kim Jae-hwan
597	March 11, 2023	YB	Kim Jae-hwan	Cigarette Girl (remake by YB of orig. song by Song Chang-sik)	Kim Jae-hwan
598	March 18, 2023	YB	Kim Jin-ho	Blue Whale (orig. song by YB)	Kang Seung-yoon
598	March 18, 2023	YB	Kim Chang-yeon	After Sending You (orig. song by YB)	Kang Seung-yoon
598	March 18, 2023	YB	UV	Tarzan (orig. song by YB)	Kang Seung-yoon
598	March 18, 2023	YB	Espero	It Must Have Been Love (orig. song by Yoon Do-hyun)	Kang Seung-yoon
598	March 18, 2023	YB	Kang Seung-yoon	A Flying Butterfly (orig. song by YB)	Kang Seung-yoon
599	March 25, 2023	"Don't Underestimate the Kids" Special	Kim Da-hyun	Song In (orig. song by Jang Yoon-jeong)	Kim Da-hyun & Jeon Yu-jin (Note: 15th tie and 7th joint win in the show's history)
599	March 25, 2023	"Don't Underestimate the Kids" Special	Kim Yu-ha	Running in the Sky (orig. song by Lee Juck)	Kim Da-hyun & Jeon Yu-jin
599	March 25, 2023	"Don't Underestimate the Kids" Special	Oh Yoo-jin	The Pierrot Smiles at Us (orig. song by Kim Wan-sun)	Kim Da-hyun & Jeon Yu-jin
599	March 25, 2023	"Don't Underestimate the Kids" Special	Kim Tae-yeon	Everyone (orig. song by Yoon Bok-hee)	Kim Da-hyun & Jeon Yu-jin
599	March 25, 2023	"Don't Underestimate the Kids" Special	Jeon Yu-jin	Get Up (orig. song by Kim Kwang-seok)	Kim Da-hyun & Jeon Yu-jin
599	March 25, 2023	"Don't Underestimate the Kids" Special	An Yul	Affection (orig. song by Kim Soo-hee)	Kim Da-hyun & Jeon Yu-jin
600	April 1, 2023	Sim Soo-bong	Nmixx (except Sullyoon)	I Miss You Enough to Hate (orig. song by Sim Soo-bong)	Sohyang & PRIME KINGZ
600	April 1, 2023	Sim Soo-bong	Maddox	The Man From Back Then (orig. song by Sim Soo-bong)	Sohyang & PRIME KINGZ
600	April 1, 2023	Sim Soo-bong	Ailee	I Only Know Love (orig. song by Sim Soo-bong)	Sohyang & PRIME KINGZ
600	April 1, 2023	Sim Soo-bong	Hong Kyung-min	Romance Gray (orig. song by Sim Soo-bong)	Sohyang & PRIME KINGZ
600	April 1, 2023	Sim Soo-bong	Sohyang & PRIME KINGZ (except Knucks and 2Face)	One Million Roses (orig. song by Sim Soo-bong)	Sohyang & PRIME KINGZ
601	April 8, 2023	Sim Soo-bong	Yang Ji-eun	This Autumn, I Will Love (orig. song by Bang Mi)	Song Ga-in
601	April 8, 2023	Sim Soo-bong	TAN	Men Are Ships, Women Are Ports (orig. song by Sim Soo-bong)	Song Ga-in
601	April 8, 2023	Sim Soo-bong	Monni	Young Sun (remake by Sim Soo-bong of orig. song by Park Kwang-joo)	Song Ga-in
601	April 8, 2023	Sim Soo-bong	Song Ga-in	Binari (orig. song by Sim Soo-bong)	Song Ga-in
601	April 8, 2023	Sim Soo-bong	ALi	Because I Am A Woman (orig. song by Sim Soo-bong)	Song Ga-in
602	April 15, 2023	2023 Kim Yon-ja Spring Blossom Train Special	Kang Ye-seul	Unrequited Love & Older Brother (orig. songs by Joo Hyun-mi & Geum Jan-di)	No Winner
602	April 15, 2023	2023 Kim Yon-ja Spring Blossom Train Special	Yang Ji-eun	Gamsugwang, Let Me Have a Drink & Spring Days Flit Through My Mind (orig. songs by Haeeunlee, Yang Ji-eun & Baek Seol-hee)	No Winner
602	April 15, 2023	2023 Kim Yon-ja Spring Blossom Train Special	Kim Yon-ja	Mother (orig. song by Na Huna)	No Winner
602	April 15, 2023	2023 Kim Yon-ja Spring Blossom Train Special	Jung Mi-ae	My Dear (orig. song by Chung Eui-song)	No Winner
602	April 15, 2023	2023 Kim Yon-ja Spring Blossom Train Special	Kim Yon-ja	Mercury Lamp (orig. song by Kim Yon-ja)	No Winner
602	April 15, 2023	2023 Kim Yon-ja Spring Blossom Train Special	Jung Mi-ae	Don't Worry & Hurrah for Ssireum Champion (orig. songs by Jung Mi-ae & Kim Yon-ja)	No Winner
602	April 15, 2023	2023 Kim Yon-ja Spring Blossom Train Special	An Yul	Is Love Like This (orig. song by Lim Young-woong)	No Winner
602	April 15, 2023	2023 Kim Yon-ja Spring Blossom Train Special	Hwang Min-ho	Jintobaegi (orig. song by Lee Chan-won)	No Winner
602	April 15, 2023	2023 Kim Yon-ja Spring Blossom Train Special	Hwang Min-woo	Bling Bling (orig. song by Kim Yon-ja)	No Winner
602	April 15, 2023	2023 Kim Yon-ja Spring Blossom Train Special	Lee Chan-won	Wish Lanterns & Yeongdong Blues (orig. songs by Lee Chan-won & Joo Hyun-mi)	No Winner
602	April 15, 2023	2023 Kim Yon-ja Spring Blossom Train Special	Kim Yon-ja	A Man in a Yellow Shirt & The Heartrending Miari Pass (orig. songs by Han Myung-sook & Lee Hae-yeon)	No Winner
602	April 15, 2023	2023 Kim Yon-ja Spring Blossom Train Special	All performers	Amor Fati (orig. song by Kim Yon-ja)	No Winner
603	April 22, 2023	Choi Jung-won	TAN	Summer Nights (orig. song from the musical Grease)	La Poem
603	April 22, 2023	Choi Jung-won	Monni	This Is the Moment (orig. song from the musical Jekyll & Hyde)	La Poem
603	April 22, 2023	Choi Jung-won	Lee Ji-hoon	Les Temps des Cathédrales (orig. song from the musical Notre-Dame de Paris)	La Poem
603	April 22, 2023	Choi Jung-won	Kim Yeon-ji	Memory (orig. song from the musical Cats)	La Poem
603	April 22, 2023	Choi Jung-won	La Poem	The Phantom of the Opera (orig. song from the musical The Phantom of the Opera)	La Poem
603	April 22, 2023	Choi Jung-won	Kim Jun-su	Song of a Man (orig. song from the musical Hero)	La Poem
604	April 29, 2023	Song Chang-sik	Yang Dong-geun (Note: with special guest performance by rapper Camo)	Cigarette Girl (orig. song by Song Chang-sik)	Lee Mu-jin
604	April 29, 2023	Song Chang-sik	Hwanhee	It's Love (orig. song by Song Chang-sik)	Lee Mu-jin
604	April 29, 2023	Song Chang-sik	Jo Myeong-seop	Peter Piper (orig. song by Song Chang-sik)	Lee Mu-jin
604	April 29, 2023	Song Chang-sik	Xdinary Heroes (except O.de)	Why Do You Call Me? (orig. song by Song Chang-sik)	Lee Mu-jin
604	April 29, 2023	Song Chang-sik	Lee Mu-jin	The Very First Confession (orig. song by Song Chang-sik)	Lee Mu-jin
605	May 6, 2023	Song Chang-sik	Jun Seung-hwan	Night Snow (orig. song by Song Chang-sik)	Lena Park
605	May 6, 2023	Song Chang-sik	Yurisangja	We Are (orig. song by Song Chang-sik)	Lena Park
605	May 6, 2023	Song Chang-sik	Aimers	Whale Hunting (orig. song by Song Chang-sik)	Lena Park
605	May 6, 2023	Song Chang-sik	Park Chang-geun	My Guitar Story (orig. song by Song Chang-sik)	Lena Park
605	May 6, 2023	Song Chang-sik	Lena Park	Green Day (orig. song by Song Chang-sik)	Lena Park
606	May 13, 2023	Celestial Kings of High Notes	DK	Endless (orig. song by Flower)	Kim Dong-hyun
606	May 13, 2023	Celestial Kings of High Notes	Kim Kyung-ho	I Will Show You (orig. song by Ailee)	Kim Dong-hyun
606	May 13, 2023	Celestial Kings of High Notes	Koh Yu-jin	Jasmine (orig. song by Lee Seung-chul)	Kim Dong-hyun
606	May 13, 2023	Celestial Kings of High Notes	Jongho (Ateez)	So You (orig. song by Yarn)	Kim Dong-hyun
606	May 13, 2023	Celestial Kings of High Notes	Kim Dong-hyun	Last Love (orig. song by Kim Bum-soo)	Kim Dong-hyun
606	May 13, 2023	Celestial Kings of High Notes	Lee Hyuk	If You Were Like Me (orig. song by Park Sang-tae)	Kim Dong-hyun
607	May 20, 2023	Kim Chang-ok Talk Concert	Kim So-hyun & Son Jun-ho	You're My Life (orig. song by Choi Jin-hee)	No Winner
607	May 20, 2023	Kim Chang-ok Talk Concert	Hong Seo-beom	Thank You (orig. song by Cho Hang-jo)	No Winner
607	May 20, 2023	Kim Chang-ok Talk Concert	Hong Seo-beom & Jo Gap-kyung	My Love to You (orig. song by Hong Seo-beom & Jo Gap-Kyung)	No Winner
607	May 20, 2023	Kim Chang-ok Talk Concert	Hong Kyung-min	Wish List (orig. song by Byun Jin-sub)	No Winner
607	May 20, 2023	Kim Chang-ok Talk Concert	Jung Da-kyung	Dear Love (orig. song by Jang Yoon-jeong)	No Winner
607	May 20, 2023	Kim Chang-ok Talk Concert	Kim Ho-young	Pull It Up (orig. song by Kim Ho-young)	No Winner
607	May 20, 2023	Kim Chang-ok Talk Concert	Park Hae-mi	Everyone (orig. song by Yoon Bok-hee)	No Winner
608	May 27, 2023	Kim Chang-ok Talk Concert	Kim So-hyun & Son Jun-ho	Hymne à l'amour (Korean remake of orig. song by Édith Piaf)	No Winner
608	May 27, 2023	Kim Chang-ok Talk Concert	Hong Seo-beom	I Didn't Want Love From You (orig. song by Hong Seo-beom)	No Winner
608	May 27, 2023	Kim Chang-ok Talk Concert	Jung Da-kyung & her mother	Mother to Daughter (orig. song by Yang Hee-eun)	No Winner
608	May 27, 2023	Kim Chang-ok Talk Concert	Park Hae-mi & Hwang Sung-jae	Family Portrait (orig. song by Kim Jin-ho)	No Winner
608	May 27, 2023	Kim Chang-ok Talk Concert	Hong Kyung-min	I'm the Youngest Today (orig. song by Kim Yong-im)	No Winner
608	May 27, 2023	Kim Chang-ok Talk Concert	Kim Ho-young	Musical (orig. song by Im Sang-ah)	No Winner
608	May 27, 2023	Kim Chang-ok Talk Concert	Kim Da-hyun	Father (orig. song by Insooni)	No Winner
609	June 3, 2023	Jin Sung	Hwang Min-woo & Hwang Min-ho	Your Lantern (orig. song by Jin Sung)	Lee Chan-won
609	June 3, 2023	Jin Sung	Kim Soo-chan	Coin Life (orig. song by Jin Sung)	Lee Chan-won
609	June 3, 2023	Jin Sung	Jeon Yu-jin	At Andong Station (orig. song by Jin Sung)	Lee Chan-won
609	June 3, 2023	Jin Sung	Jung Mi-ae	One's Impoverished Days (orig. song by Jin Sung)	Lee Chan-won
609	June 3, 2023	Jin Sung	Lee Chan-won	My Mom (orig. song by Jin Sung)	Lee Chan-won
609	June 3, 2023	Jin Sung	Yang Ji-eun	Don't Go (orig. song by Jin Sung)	Lee Chan-won
610	June 10, 2023	KBS Senior (Note: with Lim Soo-min as team captain) & Junior (Note: with Kang Seung-hwa as team captain) Announcers Special	Round 1, Team Senior: Choi Seung-don (47 points)	Crossing the Hill of Bakjaldae in Tears (orig. song by Park Jae-hong)	Team Senior (Note: The scores for all three performances of each team were added to determine the winner, 100 points were available per round by randomly assigning 100 members of the audience to vote. Only valid votes were counted.) (163 vs. 136 points)
610	June 10, 2023	KBS Senior & Junior Announcers Special	Round 1, Team Junior: Lee Jae-seong & Park Ji-won (53 points)	Why Don't You Know? (orig. song by Chuli & Miae)	Team Senior (163 vs. 136 points)
610	June 10, 2023	KBS Senior & Junior Announcers Special	Round 2, Team Junior: Kim Jin-woong with narration from Lee Kwang-yeop & Lee Yun-jeong (46 points)	My Way (orig. song by Frank Sinatra)	Team Senior (163 vs. 136 points)
610	June 10, 2023	KBS Senior & Junior Announcers Special	Round 2, Team Senior: Lee Seung-yeon & Kim Bo-min (54 points)	Napal Baji (orig. song by Psy)	Team Senior (163 vs. 136 points)
610	June 10, 2023	KBS Senior & Junior Announcers Special	Round 3, Team Senior: Lee Kyu-bong, Lee Young-ho & Lee Kwang-yong (62 points)	Hidden Road (orig. song by Yoo Jae-ha)	Team Senior (163 vs. 136 points)
610	June 10, 2023	KBS Senior & Junior Announcers Special	Round 3, Team Junior: Lim Ji-woong & Kim Jin-hyun (37 points)	Though I Loved You (orig. song by Kim Kwang-seok)	Team Senior (163 vs. 136 points)
611	June 17, 2023	Cheers for the Heroes in Uniform Special	Kim So-hyun & Son Jun-ho	You, My Friend (orig. song by Patti Kim)	Ateez
611	June 17, 2023	Cheers for the Heroes in Uniform Special	Bada	Like the Flame (orig. song by Kim Bum-ryong)	Ateez
611	June 17, 2023	Cheers for the Heroes in Uniform Special	La Poem	Song of Wind (orig. song by Cho Yong-pil)	Ateez
611	June 17, 2023	Cheers for the Heroes in Uniform Special	Ateez	Jilpoonggado (orig. song by Yu Jung-seok)	Ateez
611	June 17, 2023	Cheers for the Heroes in Uniform Special	Min Woo-hyuk	My Starry Love (orig. song by Lim Young-woong)	Ateez
611	June 17, 2023	Cheers for the Heroes in Uniform Special	The New Six	Sunset Glow (orig. song by Lee Moon-sae)	Ateez
612	June 24, 2023	The "Last Song" Special	Yun Seong	Morning Dew (orig. song by Yang Hee-eun)	Seomoon Tak
612	June 24, 2023	The "Last Song" Special	Kim Ki-tae	Don't You Worry (orig. song by Deulgukhwa)	Seomoon Tak
612	June 24, 2023	The "Last Song" Special	Forestella	Legends Never Die (orig. song by Against the Current)	Seomoon Tak
612	June 24, 2023	The "Last Song" Special	Seomoon Tak	Love, Never Fade & Everyone (orig. songs by Seomoon Tak & Yoon Bok-hee)	Seomoon Tak
612	June 24, 2023	The "Last Song" Special	Kim Dong-hyun	Do You Know (orig. song by Jo Sung-mo)	Seomoon Tak
613	July 1, 2023	The "Last Song" Special	Younha	Spring Day (orig. song by BTS)	Kim Feel
613	July 1, 2023	The "Last Song" Special	Kim Jun-su	Hangyeryeong (orig. song by Yang Hee-eun)	Kim Feel
613	July 1, 2023	The "Last Song" Special	Choi Jung-in	For You (orig. song by Yim Jae-beom)	Kim Feel
613	July 1, 2023	The "Last Song" Special	Kim Feel	We Are (orig. song by Lee Seung-yeol)	Kim Feel
613	July 1, 2023	The "Last Song" Special	Jo Jang-hyuk	After Love (orig. song by Deulgukhwa)	Kim Feel
614	July 8, 2023	Lee Ja-yeon & Chu Ga-yeoul	Stephanie & Seol Ha-yoon	My Brother (orig. song by Geum Jan-di)	Im Tae-kyung
614	July 8, 2023	Lee Ja-yeon & Chu Ga-yeoul	Hong Ja	Don't Go Away (orig. song by Chu Ga-yeoul)	Im Tae-kyung
614	July 8, 2023	Lee Ja-yeon & Chu Ga-yeoul	Sungmin	Night Train (orig. song by Kim Yon-ja)	Im Tae-kyung
614	July 8, 2023	Lee Ja-yeon & Chu Ga-yeoul	Hwang Min-woo & Hwang Min-ho	Meaning of You (orig. song by Lee Ja-yeon)	Im Tae-kyung
614	July 8, 2023	Lee Ja-yeon & Chu Ga-yeoul	6BAND	Chalrang Chalrang (orig. song by Lee Ja-yeon)	Im Tae-kyung
614	July 8, 2023	Lee Ja-yeon & Chu Ga-yeoul	Im Tae-kyung	Life Like the Clouds (orig. song by Lee Ja-yeon)	Im Tae-kyung
615 (Note: Special performance by Forestella with the song Despacito (orig. song by Luis Fonsi ft. Daddy Yankee))	July 15, 2023	King of Kings Special: 1st Half of 2023	Kim Jae-hwan	Password 486 (orig. song by Younha)	Kim Ho-joong (441 points)
615	July 15, 2023	King of Kings Special: 1st Half of 2023	Park Chang-geun	You're Far Away (orig. song by Kim Choo-ja)	Kim Ho-joong (441 points)
615	July 15, 2023	King of Kings Special: 1st Half of 2023	Sohyang	Part of Your World (OST by Jodi Benson for The Little Mermaid)	Kim Ho-joong (441 points)
615	July 15, 2023	King of Kings Special: 1st Half of 2023	Jeong Sun-ah & Min Woo-hyuk	Mama (orig. song by Exo-K)	Kim Ho-joong (441 points)
616	July 22, 2023	King of Kings Special: 1st Half of 2023	Lee Mu-jin	Love That Is Too Painful Isn't Love (orig. song by Kim Kwang-seok)	Kim Ho-joong (441 points)
616	July 22, 2023	King of Kings Special: 1st Half of 2023	Bada	Next Level & Dreams Come True (orig. songs by Aespa & S.E.S.)	Kim Ho-joong (441 points)
616	July 22, 2023	King of Kings Special: 1st Half of 2023	Kim Ho-joong	Tes! (orig. song by Na Hoon-a)	Kim Ho-joong (441 points)
616	July 22, 2023	King of Kings Special: 1st Half of 2023	Im Tae-kyung	You, My Friend (orig. song by Patti Kim)	Kim Ho-joong (441 points)
616	July 22, 2023	King of Kings Special: 1st Half of 2023	La Poem	Ave Maria (orig. song by Rebecca Luker)	Kim Ho-joong (441 points)
617	July 29, 2023	"Finding the Treasure-like Songs from the 1970s" Special	Soran	Sunny Day (orig. song by Song Dae-kwan)	Jung Dong-ha
617	July 29, 2023	"Finding the Treasure-like Songs from the 1970s" Special	Yang Ji-eun	Cherry (orig. song by Choi Heon)	Jung Dong-ha
617	July 29, 2023	"Finding the Treasure-like Songs from the 1970s" Special	Sunnie (formerly of The Barberettes)	Night Train (orig. song by Lee Eun-ha)	Jung Dong-ha
617	July 29, 2023	"Finding the Treasure-like Songs from the 1970s" Special	Jung Dong-ha	My Dear (orig. song by Pearl Sisters)	Jung Dong-ha
617	July 29, 2023	"Finding the Treasure-like Songs from the 1970s" Special	Choi Jung-won	Wherever I Would Stay (orig. song by Park Kyung-hee)	Jung Dong-ha
617	July 29, 2023	"Finding the Treasure-like Songs from the 1970s" Special	Hyojung (Oh My Girl)	Coastal Pier (orig. song by Kim Trio)	Jung Dong-ha
618	August 5, 2023	Rock Festival in Ulsan	Joint Jam Performance (Note: consisting of Kim Jin-won, Heo Joon, Park Tae-hee & Scott Hellowell of (YB), Han Kyung-rok & Kim In-soo of Crying Nut, Kim Do-hyung of Jannabi and Chae Do-hyeon of Touched)	What Am I To Do?, Going Round and Round, Cigarette Girl (orig. songs by Sand Pebbles, Jeon In-kwon, Song Chang-sik)	No Winner
618	August 5, 2023	Rock Festival in Ulsan	Crying Nut	Myeongdong Calling, Speed Up Losers & Isn't That Good? (orig. songs by Crying Nut)	No Winner
618	August 5, 2023	Rock Festival in Ulsan	Touched	Highlight & Beautiful Country (orig. songs by Touched & The Men)	No Winner
618	August 5, 2023	Rock Festival in Ulsan	Lee Mu-jin	No One & Traffic Light (orig. songs by Han Young-ae & Lee Mu-jin)	No Winner
619	August 12, 2023	Rock Festival in Ulsan	Kim Chang-wan & Lee Mu-jin	It Might Have Been Late Summer (orig. song by Sanulrim)	No Winner
619	August 12, 2023	Rock Festival in Ulsan	Kim Chang-wan Band	Let's Sing & Already Now (orig. songs by Sanulrim)	No Winner
619	August 12, 2023	Rock Festival in Ulsan	Lee Seung-yoon	Love, Two, Wild Horse & Pricey Hangover (orig. songs by Yoon Do-hyun & Lee Seung-yoon)	No Winner
619	August 12, 2023	Rock Festival in Ulsan	Jannabi	Laying Silk on My Heart, Summer II & Baby I Need You (orig. songs by Sanulrim & Jannabi)	No Winner
619	August 12, 2023	Rock Festival in Ulsan	YB (Note: The band could only perform one song before the festival was delayed and later cancelled due to a thunderstorm. Other bands such as Monni and Soran were also scheduled to perform but were not able to.)	Blue Whale (orig. song by YB)	No Winner
620	August 19, 2023	Park Hyun-bin	Hong Ji-yun	Bling Bling (orig. song by Park Hyun-bin)	Na Tae-ju
620	August 19, 2023	Park Hyun-bin	Sungmin	Dead Drunk (orig. song by Park Hyun-bin)	Na Tae-ju
620	August 19, 2023	Park Hyun-bin	Park Seo-jin	Bbarabbabba (orig. song by Park Hyun-bin)	Na Tae-ju
620	August 19, 2023	Park Hyun-bin	Na Tae-ju	Cool Life (orig. song by Park Hyun-bin)	Na Tae-ju
620	August 19, 2023	Park Hyun-bin	Jung Da-kyung	So Hot! (orig. song by Park Hyun-bin)	Na Tae-ju
621	August 26, 2023	Hot Celebrities Special	Hong Seok-cheon	First Impression (orig. song by Kim Gun-mo)	Jo Hye-ryun
621	August 26, 2023	Hot Celebrities Special	Song Seong-ho (Note: Introduced as Chief Song and currently Lee Young-ja's manager)	After Sending You (orig. song by YB)	Jo Hye-ryun
621	August 26, 2023	Hot Celebrities Special	Kwon Il-yong & Pyo Chang-won	Old Love (orig. song by Lee Moon-sae)	Jo Hye-ryun
621	August 26, 2023	Hot Celebrities Special	Jo Hye-ryun	Joy (orig. song by Jung Su-ra)	Jo Hye-ryun
621	August 26, 2023	Hot Celebrities Special	Kim Il-joong	I Swear (orig. song by Jo Sung-mo)	Jo Hye-ryun
621	August 26, 2023	Hot Celebrities Special	Park Ji-hoon	Never Ending Story (orig. song by Boohwal)	Jo Hye-ryun
622 (Note: Yang Hee-eun, Lee Sung-mi & Kim Hye-young were part of the audience)	September 2, 2023	Kim Soo-chul	Lisa, Stephanie, ALi & Hwang Woo-lim	Tomorrow (orig. song by Kim Soo-chul)	Jo Jang-hyuk
622	September 2, 2023	Kim Soo-chul	Band Nah	No No (orig. song by Kim Soo-chul)	Jo Jang-hyuk
622	September 2, 2023	Kim Soo-chul	Jo Jang-hyuk	Parting (orig. song by Kim Soo-chul)	Jo Jang-hyuk
622	September 2, 2023	Kim Soo-chul	Ahn Ye-eun	I'm Going Too (orig. song by Kim Soo-chul)	Jo Jang-hyuk
622	September 2, 2023	Kim Soo-chul	Xikers (except Junghoon)	Youthful You (orig. song by Kim Soo-chul)	Jo Jang-hyuk
623 (Note: Special video messages by Lee Byung-hun and Park Chan-wook)	September 9, 2023	Kim Soo-chul	Yang Dong-geun & Nam Hyun-joon	Brother & Chiki Chiki Chaka Chaka (orig. songs by Kim Soo-chul)	La Poem
623	September 9, 2023	Kim Soo-chul	Crying Nut	I Won't Fall In Love Again (orig. song by Kim Soo-chul)	La Poem
623	September 9, 2023	Kim Soo-chul	La Poem	Why Don't You Know? (orig. song by Kim Soo-chul)	La Poem
623	September 9, 2023	Kim Soo-chul	Monni & Oh Eun-chul (Craxilver)	Wake Up! (orig. song by Kim Soo-chul)	La Poem
623	September 9, 2023	Kim Soo-chul	Kim Ki-tae	Forgotten Flower (orig. song by Kim Soo-chul)	La Poem
624	September 16, 2023	Songs of Memories Special (Note: Celebrating World Alzheimer's Day. Special opening performance by Nosonoso Choir consisting of older adults with Alzheimer's Disease and their families with the song "Being Happy" (orig. song by Chu Ga-yeoul))	Soran	Way To Go! (orig. song by Girls' Generation)	Kim Johan, Muzie & Hanhae
624	September 16, 2023	Songs of Memories Special	Kim Johan, Muzie & Hanhae	Only You (orig. song by Lee Chi-hyun and Friends)	Kim Johan, Muzie & Hanhae
624	September 16, 2023	Songs of Memories Special	Tei	The Letter (orig. song by Kim Kwang-jin)	Kim Johan, Muzie & Hanhae
624	September 16, 2023	Songs of Memories Special	Jeong Dong-won	Things We Took For Granted (orig. song by Lee Juck)	Kim Johan, Muzie & Hanhae
624	September 16, 2023	Songs of Memories Special	Lee Bo-ram & Baek Ye-bin	Festival (orig. song by Uhm Jung-hwa)	Kim Johan, Muzie & Hanhae
625	September 23, 2023	late Son Mog-in	Chang Eun-sook	Unrequited Love (orig. song by Ko Bok-soo)	Cho Hang-jo
625	September 23, 2023	late Son Mog-in	Park Hyun-bin	Dad's Youth (orig. song by Oh Ki-taek)	Cho Hang-jo
625	September 23, 2023	late Son Mog-in	Han Hye-jin	Symphonic Poem of the Sea (orig. song by Kim Jung-gu)	Cho Hang-jo
625	September 23, 2023	late Son Mog-in	Cho Hang-jo	Sorrow of the Desert (orig. song by Ko Bok-soo)	Cho Hang-jo
625	September 23, 2023	late Son Mog-in	Kang Jin	The Guitar of Mother & Daughter (orig. song by Choi Sook-ja)	Cho Hang-jo
626	September 30, 2023	late Son Mog-in	Lee Ja-yeon	Wife's Song (remake by Shim Yeom-ok of orig. song by Kim Baek-hee)	Kim Bum-ryong
626	September 30, 2023	late Son Mog-in	Jin Sung	Life Away From Home (orig. song by Ko Bok-soo)	Kim Bum-ryong
626	September 30, 2023	late Son Mog-in	Kim Yong-im	Tears of Mokpo (orig. song by Lee Nan-young)	Kim Bum-ryong
626	September 30, 2023	late Son Mog-in	Jin Si-mon	Matroos Park (orig. song by Oh Ki-taek)	Kim Bum-ryong
626	September 30, 2023	late Son Mog-in	Kim Bum-ryong	Shoeshine Boy (orig. song by Park Dan-ma)	Kim Bum-ryong
No broadcast on October 7 due to the live coverage of the 2022 Asian Games.
627	October 14, 2023	Yoon Hyung-joo & Kim Se-hwan	Vanner	Saturday Night (orig. song by Kim Se-hwan)	6BAND
627	October 14, 2023	Yoon Hyung-joo & Kim Se-hwan	Lee Solomon	Our Stories (remake by Yoon Hyung-joo of traditional Fijian song Isa Lei)	6BAND
627	October 14, 2023	Yoon Hyung-joo & Kim Se-hwan	6BAND	A Flower Shop Girl (remake by Yoon Hyung-joo of orig. song by Bon Bon Quartet)	6BAND
627	October 14, 2023	Yoon Hyung-joo & Kim Se-hwan	Shin Seung-tae	Is She Angry (orig. song by Kim Se-hwan)	6BAND
627	October 14, 2023	Yoon Hyung-joo & Kim Se-hwan	Kim Yong-pil	Heart in Love (orig. song by Kim Se-hwan)	6BAND
628	October 21, 2023	Yoon Hyung-joo & Kim Se-hwan	Yurisangja	Sitting on the Sidewalk (orig. song by Kim Se-hwan)	Forténa
628	October 21, 2023	Yoon Hyung-joo & Kim Se-hwan	Maddox	Yesterday's Rain (orig. song by Yoon Hyung-joo)	Forténa
628	October 21, 2023	Yoon Hyung-joo & Kim Se-hwan	Forténa	Wedding Cake (remake by Twin Folio of orig. song by Connie Francis)	Forténa
628	October 21, 2023	Yoon Hyung-joo & Kim Se-hwan	Band Nah (except PAIIEK)	Who Cares When I Like It (orig. song by Kim Se-hwan)	Forténa
628	October 21, 2023	Yoon Hyung-joo & Kim Se-hwan	Ailee	White Handkerchief (remake by Twin Folio of orig. song by Nana Mouskouri)	Forténa
629	October 28, 2023	Cho Hang-jo	Libelante	If (orig. song by Cho Hang-jo)	Nam Hyun-joon & Park Ae-ri
629	October 28, 2023	Cho Hang-jo	Band Nah	Love and Life (orig. song by Cho Hang-jo)	Nam Hyun-joon & Park Ae-ri
629	October 28, 2023	Cho Hang-jo	Kim Soo-chan	Lies (orig. song by Cho Hang-jo)	Nam Hyun-joon & Park Ae-ri
629	October 28, 2023	Cho Hang-jo	Yang Ji-eun	Because I Am a Man (orig. song by Cho Hang-jo)	Nam Hyun-joon & Park Ae-ri
629	October 28, 2023	Cho Hang-jo	Jung Hong-il	Happy for You (orig. song by Cho Hang-jo)	Nam Hyun-joon & Park Ae-ri
629	October 28, 2023	Cho Hang-jo	Nam Hyun-joon & Park Ae-ri	Thank You (orig. song by Cho Hang-jo)	Nam Hyun-joon & Park Ae-ri
630	November 4, 2023	Oh My Star Special #4	Bada & Jo Kwon	Lie on the Sea (orig. song by The Treble Clef)	Koo Chang-mo & Ahn Shin-ae
630	November 4, 2023	Oh My Star Special #4	Koh Yu-jin & Yun Seong	Break Up With Her (orig. song by Kim Hyun-jung)	Koo Chang-mo & Ahn Shin-ae
630	November 4, 2023	Oh My Star Special #4	Han Hye-jin & Lee Chang-min	In Front of the House (orig. song by Lee Jae-sung)	Koo Chang-mo & Ahn Shin-ae
630	November 4, 2023	Oh My Star Special #4	Michael K. Lee & Yoon Hyung-Ryul	Livin' la Vida Loca (orig. song by Ricky Martin)	Koo Chang-mo & Ahn Shin-ae
630	November 4, 2023	Oh My Star Special #4	Koo Chang-mo & Ahn Shin-ae (formerly of The Barberettes)	I Can't Tell You & An Encounter by Chance (orig. songs by Love and Peace and Songgolmae)	Koo Chang-mo & Ahn Shin-ae
631	November 11, 2023	Oh My Star Special #4	6BAND & Kim Kwang-kyu	A Cup of Makgeolli (orig. song by Kang Jin)	Jung Hoon-hee & La Poem
631	November 11, 2023	Oh My Star Special #4	Yang Ji-eun & Jeon Yu-jin	Nation of Morning (orig. song by Kim Yon-ja)	Jung Hoon-hee & La Poem
631	November 11, 2023	Oh My Star Special #4	Stephanie & Kim Ki-tae	Fake Love (orig. song by BTS)	Jung Hoon-hee & La Poem
631	November 11, 2023	Oh My Star Special #4	ALi & Maddox	Twenty-Five, Twenty-One (orig. song by Jaurim)	Jung Hoon-hee & La Poem
631	November 11, 2023	Oh My Star Special #4	Jung Hoon-hee & La Poem	Beautiful Woman (orig. song by Shin Jung Hyun & Yup Juns)	Jung Hoon-hee & La Poem
632	November 18, 2023	Immortal Songs Live Concert in the U.S. (Note: Show's 1st ever recording made abroad to commemorate the 120th anniversary of Korean immigration to the United States. It was held on October 26, 2023 at Prudential Center in Newark, NJ.)	Kim Tae-woo (g.o.d)	New York, New York (Remake by Frank Sinatra of orig. OST by Liza Minnelli for New York, New York)	No Winner
632	November 18, 2023	Immortal Songs Live Concert in the U.S.	Jannabi	For Lovers Who Hesitate & Summer (orig. songs by Jannabi)	No Winner
632	November 18, 2023	Immortal Songs Live Concert in the U.S.	Ateez	Bouncy (K-Hot Chilli Peppers), Say My Name & The Real (orig. songs by Ateez)	No Winner
632	November 18, 2023	Immortal Songs Live Concert in the U.S.	Jannabi & Jong-ho (Ateez)	In the Rain (orig. song by Lee Moon-sae)	No Winner
632	November 18, 2023	Immortal Songs Live Concert in the U.S.	Lena Park	In Dreams & By Chance (orig. songs by Lena Park and Lee Jung-sun)	No Winner
632	November 18, 2023	Immortal Songs Live Concert in the U.S.	Young Tak	Form & What Are You Doing Here? (orig. songs by Young Tak)	No Winner
632	November 18, 2023	Immortal Songs Live Concert in the U.S.	Kim Tae-woo	Love Rain & One Candle (orig. songs by Kim Tae-woo and g.o.d)	No Winner
632	November 18, 2023	Immortal Songs Live Concert in the U.S.	Patti Kim	Love That Left Autumn, Love is Flower of Life, Can't Live Without You & My Way (orig. songs by Patti Kim and Frank Sinatra)	No Winner
633	November 25, 2023	Immortal Songs Live Concert in the U.S.	Ateez	HALAZIA, Wonderland & Guerrilla (orig. songs by Ateez)	No Winner
633	November 25, 2023	Immortal Songs Live Concert in the U.S.	Kim Tae-woo	Friday Night (orig. song by g.o.d)	No Winner
633	November 25, 2023	Immortal Songs Live Concert in the U.S.	Jannabi	Dreams, Books, Power and Walls, Come Back Home & Knockin' on Heaven's Door (orig. songs by Jannabi and Bob Dylan)	No Winner
633	November 25, 2023	Immortal Songs Live Concert in the U.S.	Lena Park	Bridge over Troubled Water (orig. song by Simon & Garfunkel)	No Winner
633	November 25, 2023	Immortal Songs Live Concert in the U.S.	Lee Chan-won	Twist Go Go & Mercury Lamp (orig. songs by Lee Chan-won and Kim Yon-ja)	No Winner
633	November 25, 2023	Immortal Songs Live Concert in the U.S.	Young Tak	A Glass of Makgeolli & Jjiniya (orig. songs by Kang Jin and Young Tak)	No Winner
633	November 25, 2023	Immortal Songs Live Concert in the U.S.	Patti Kim	Show and Farewell & You, My Friend (orig. songs by Patti Kim)	No Winner
633	November 25, 2023	Immortal Songs Live Concert in the U.S.	Psy	Gentleman, That That, Daddy & Gangnam Style (orig. songs by Psy)	No Winner
634	December 2, 2023	Legendary Remake Special	Oh Eun-chul (Craxilver) & Roh Hyun-woo (Libelante)	Don't You Worry (remake by Lee Juck of orig. song by Deulgukhwa)	HuhYongByul
634	December 2, 2023	Legendary Remake Special	Dreamcatcher	Balloons (remake by TVXQ of orig. song by Five Fingers)	HuhYongByul
634	December 2, 2023	Legendary Remake Special	Heo Sol-ji (EXID)	Sad Fate (remake by 015B of orig. song by Nami)	HuhYongByul
634	December 2, 2023	Legendary Remake Special	Maddox	Sleepless Rainy Night (remakes by Kim Gun-mo & IU of orig. song by Lee Seung-chul)	HuhYongByul
634	December 2, 2023	Legendary Remake Special	HuhYongByul (Huh Gak, Shin Yong-jae & Lim Han-byul)	The Wind Blows (first remake by Sumi Jo of orig. song by Lee So-ra)	HuhYongByul
635	December 9, 2023	Legendary Remake Special	Touched	Becoming Dust (remake by Kim Kwang-seok of orig. song by Lee Micky)	Yoo Hwe-seung
635	December 9, 2023	Legendary Remake Special	Lucy	Highway Romance (remake by Kim Jang-hoon of orig. song by Yoon Jong-shin)	Yoo Hwe-seung
635	December 9, 2023	Legendary Remake Special	Ahn Sung-hoon	Only Longing Grows (remake by Noh Young-shim of orig. song by Yeo Jin)	Yoo Hwe-seung
635	December 9, 2023	Legendary Remake Special	Yang Ji-eun	Beautiful Land (remake by Lee Sun-hee of orig. song by Shin Joong-hyun & The Men)	Yoo Hwe-seung
635	December 9, 2023	Legendary Remake Special	Yoo Hwe-seung (N.Flying)	Goose's Dream (remake by Insooni of orig. song by Carnival)	Yoo Hwe-seung
636 (Note: With special guest performance by comedienne Lee Soo-ji with "The Wind Blows" (orig. song by Lee So-ra))	December 16, 2023	Lee Kyung-kyu	Ahn Sung-hoon	Two-Lane Bridge (OST by Cha Tae-hyun for Highway Star)	Hong Kyung-min & Kim Jung-mo
636	December 16, 2023	Lee Kyung-kyu	Hwang Chi-yeul	Love.. That Guy (orig. song by Bobby Kim)	Hong Kyung-min & Kim Jung-mo
636	December 16, 2023	Lee Kyung-kyu	Sonic Stones	Sunset Glow (orig. song by Lee Moon-sae)	Hong Kyung-min & Kim Jung-mo
636	December 16, 2023	Lee Kyung-kyu	H1-KEY	Turn the Whole Country Upside Down (OST by Kim In-kwon ft. Hyungdon and Daejun for Korea Sings)	Hong Kyung-min & Kim Jung-mo
637 (Note: With special guest performance by comedians Yoon Hyung-bin and Lee Yoon-seok with "Backpacking" (OST for Qualifications of Men))	December 23, 2023	Lee Kyung-kyu	Nam Woo-hyun	I'm Thinking of You (orig. song by Boohwal)	Hong Kyung-min & Kim Jung-mo
637	December 23, 2023	Lee Kyung-kyu	Na Tae-ju	Tes! (orig. song by Na Hoon-a)	Hong Kyung-min & Kim Jung-mo
637	December 23, 2023	Lee Kyung-kyu	Boohwal	After Love (orig. song by Deulgukhwa)	Hong Kyung-min & Kim Jung-mo
637	December 23, 2023	Lee Kyung-kyu	Hong Kyung-min & Kim Jung-mo	Leopard of Mt. Kilimanjaro (orig. song by Cho Yong-pil)	Hong Kyung-min & Kim Jung-mo
638	December 30, 2023	Kim Soo-chul and friends - Part 1	Kim Soo-chul	Nocturnal (acoustic version) & A Flower That Never Bloomed (orig. songs by Kim Soo-chul)	No Winner
638	December 30, 2023	Kim Soo-chul and friends - Part 1	Crying Nut	Seven-Colored Rainbow & Let's Run the Horse (orig. songs by Little Giant and Crying Nut)	No Winner
638	December 30, 2023	Kim Soo-chul and friends - Part 1	Gummy	You Are My Everything & No No (orig. songs by Gummy and Kim Soo-chul)	No Winner
638	December 30, 2023	Kim Soo-chul and friends - Part 1	Kim Soo-chul	Guitar Sanjo (orig. song by Kim Soo-chul)	No Winner
638	December 30, 2023	Kim Soo-chul and friends - Part 1	Sung Si-kyung	Tomorrow (orig. song by Kim Soo-chul)	No Winner
638	December 30, 2023	Kim Soo-chul and friends - Part 1	Yang Hee-eun & Sung Si-kyung	You (orig. song by Yang Hee-eun and Sung Si-kyung)	No Winner
638	December 30, 2023	Kim Soo-chul and friends - Part 1	Yang Hee-eun	Autumn Morning & Flower Vase (orig. songs by Yang Hee-eun)	No Winner
638	December 30, 2023	Kim Soo-chul and friends - Part 1	Lee Juck	Don't Worry My Dear, I'm Going Too & Run Across the Sky (orig. songs by Jeon In-kwon, Kim Soo-chul and Lee Juck)	No Winner
638	December 30, 2023	Kim Soo-chul and friends - Part 1	Kim Soo-chul	Hold On (orig. song by Kim Soo-chul)	No Winner

=== 2024 ===
List of episodes aired in 2024

Singers listed in order of performance.

Episode #	Broadcast Date	Legend or Theme	Guest Singers	Songs	Final Winner
639	January 6, 2024	Kim Soo-chul and New Friends - Part 2	Kim Soo-chul	Communication (orig. music for the 2002 FIFA World Cup Opening Ceremony)	No Winner
639	January 6, 2024	Kim Soo-chul and New Friends - Part 2	MeloMance	Love, Maybe & Forever You (OST by MeloMance for Business Proposal and orig. song by Kim Soo-chul)	No Winner
639	January 6, 2024	Kim Soo-chul and New Friends - Part 2	Forestella (except Ko Woo-rim)	Hijo de la Luna & The Show Must Go On (Korean version of orig. song by Mecano and orig. song by Queen)	No Winner
639	January 6, 2024	Kim Soo-chul and New Friends - Part 2	Kim Soo-chul	Beyond the Years (OST by Kim Soo-chul for Seopyeonje)	No Winner
639	January 6, 2024	Kim Soo-chul and New Friends - Part 2	UV (Note: Featuring Yoo Byung-jae and Song Jin-woo)	Shaggy Cut, Chikichiki Chakachaka & Zhu Bajie (orig. songs by UV and Kim Soo-chul)	No Winner
639	January 6, 2024	Kim Soo-chul and New Friends - Part 2	Son Tae-jin	Longing & Parting (orig. songs by Na Hoon-a and Kim Soo-chul)	No Winner
639	January 6, 2024	Kim Soo-chul and New Friends - Part 2	SGO (사거리 그오빠)	Love All & Love Line (orig. songs by Songgolmae and SGO)	No Winner
639	January 6, 2024	Kim Soo-chul and New Friends - Part 2	Kim Soo-chul	Youthful You (orig. song by Kim Soo-chul)	No Winner
640	January 13, 2024	Wannabe Festival in Pyeongchang (Note: Commemorative performance for the 2024 Winter Youth Olympics that had events in Pyeongchang.)	Kim Ho-joong	Champions & Arirang (orig. song by Sumi Jo and Korean traditional folk song)	No Winner
640	January 13, 2024	Wannabe Festival in Pyeongchang	Class:y	Winter Bloom & Way to Go! (orig. songs by Classy and Girls' Generation)	No Winner
640	January 13, 2024	Wannabe Festival in Pyeongchang	Jung Dong-ha	I Still Love You & Shout Myself (orig. songs by Jung Dong-ha and Maya)	No Winner
640	January 13, 2024	Wannabe Festival in Pyeongchang	Jeong Dong-won (JD1)	Who Am I? & Superstar (orig. songs by JD1 and Lee Han-chul)	No Winner
640	January 13, 2024	Wannabe Festival in Pyeongchang	Younha	Password 486 & Event Horizon (orig. songs by Younha)	No Winner
640	January 13, 2024	Wannabe Festival in Pyeongchang	Kim Ho-joong	Person Who Shines (orig. song by Kim Ho-joong)	No Winner
640	January 13, 2024	Wannabe Festival in Pyeongchang	Kim Ho-joong & Libelante	Tiritomba (orig. song by Kim Ho-joong)	No Winner
640	January 13, 2024	Wannabe Festival in Pyeongchang	Koyote	Meeting & Sad Dream (orig. songs by Koyote)	No Winner
641	January 20, 2024	Wannabe Festival in Pyeongchang	Koyote	Our Dream & Pure Love (orig. songs by Koyote)	No Winner
641	January 20, 2024	Wannabe Festival in Pyeongchang	AB6IX	Hope & Loser (orig. songs by H.O.T. and AB6IX)	No Winner
641	January 20, 2024	Wannabe Festival in Pyeongchang	Libelante	On Our Way, Butterfly & Altrove e qui (orig. songs by Libelante, Loveholics and Claudio Baglioni)	No Winner
641	January 20, 2024	Wannabe Festival in Pyeongchang	Jeong Dong-won (JD1)	Your Shampoo Scent In The Flowers (orig. song by Jang Beom-june)	No Winner
641	January 20, 2024	Wannabe Festival in Pyeongchang	Choi Jung-in	Uphill Road & Run Across the Sky (orig. songs by Choi Jung-in and Lee Juck)	No Winner
641	January 20, 2024	Wannabe Festival in Pyeongchang	Kim Ho-joong	My Own Way, Adoro & Nessun Dorma (orig. songs by Kim Ho-joong, Armando Manzanero and Giacomo Puccini)	No Winner
642	January 27, 2024	Golden Girls (Insooni, Park Mi-kyung, Shin Hyo-beom, Lee Eun-mi)	Ali	Every Night (orig. song by Insooni)	Ali
642	January 27, 2024	Golden Girls (Insooni, Park Mi-kyung, Shin Hyo-beom, Lee Eun-mi)	Heo Sol-ji	Into Memory (orig. song by Lee Eun-mi)	Ali
642	January 27, 2024	Golden Girls (Insooni, Park Mi-kyung, Shin Hyo-beom, Lee Eun-mi)	Aimers	Obsession (orig. song by Park Mi-kyung)	Ali
642	January 27, 2024	Golden Girls (Insooni, Park Mi-kyung, Shin Hyo-beom, Lee Eun-mi)	Kim So-hyun & Son Jun-ho	Father (orig. song by Insooni & Jung Dong-ha)	Ali
642	January 27, 2024	Golden Girls (Insooni, Park Mi-kyung, Shin Hyo-beom, Lee Eun-mi)	Hynn	Happiness (orig. song by Insooni)	Ali
643	February 3, 2024	Golden Girls (Insooni, Park Mi-kyung, Shin Hyo-beom, Lee Eun-mi)	Kim Yeon-ji	I Have a Lover (orig. song by Lee Eun-mi)	Musical Actresses
643	February 3, 2024	Golden Girls (Insooni, Park Mi-kyung, Shin Hyo-beom, Lee Eun-mi)	Hong Ji-yoon, Eun Ga-eun, Jung Da-kyung & Kang Ye-seul (Trot singers)	Eve's Warning (orig. song by Park Mi-kyung)	Musical Actresses
643	February 3, 2024	Golden Girls (Insooni, Park Mi-kyung, Shin Hyo-beom, Lee Eun-mi)	Bang Ye-dam	I Thought I Would Love You (orig. song by Shin Hyo-beom)	Musical Actresses
643	February 3, 2024	Golden Girls (Insooni, Park Mi-kyung, Shin Hyo-beom, Lee Eun-mi)	Lim Han-byul	I Love You (orig. song by Shim Hyo-beom)	Musical Actresses
643	February 3, 2024	Golden Girls (Insooni, Park Mi-kyung, Shin Hyo-beom, Lee Eun-mi)	Jung Young-joo, Lee Young-mi, Kim Young-joo & Choi Hyun-joo (Musical actresses)	Unreasonable Reason (orig. song by Park Mi-Kyung)	Musical Actresses
644	February 10, 2024	Jo Young-nam	Jung Dong-ha (Note: With special guest performance by Seo Beom-seok)	You and I (orig. song by Sorisae)	La Poem
644	February 10, 2024	Jo Young-nam	DK	I Can't Live Without Love (orig. song by Jo Young-nam)	La Poem
644	February 10, 2024	Jo Young-nam	Young-ki	Goodbye City (orig. song by Jo Young-nam)	La Poem
644	February 10, 2024	Jo Young-nam	H1-Key	Hwagae Marketplace (orig. song by Jo Young-nam)	La Poem
644	February 10, 2024	Jo Young-nam	La Poem	Delilah (Korean version of orig. song by Tom Jones)	La Poem
645	February 17, 2024	Jo Young-nam	Shin Seung-tae	Now (orig. song by Jo Young-nam)	Kim Ki-tae
645	February 17, 2024	Jo Young-nam	Choi Jung-won & Jung Sun-ah	Proud Mary (Korean version of orig. song by Creedence Clearwater Revival)	Kim Ki-tae
645	February 17, 2024	Jo Young-nam	Kim Ki-tae	Only Once in My Life (orig. song by Jo Young-nam)	Kim Ki-tae
645	February 17, 2024	Jo Young-nam	Monni	Zigzag (orig. song by Jo Young-nam)	Kim Ki-tae
645	February 17, 2024	Jo Young-nam	sEODo Band	Love Is (orig. song by Jo Young-nam)	Kim Ki-tae
646	February 24, 2024	Kim Bum-soo	Sandeul (B1A4)	Last Love (orig. song by Kim Bum-soo)	Seo Eun-kwang
646	February 24, 2024	Kim Bum-soo	Kim Dong-hyun	I Miss You (orig. song by Kim Bum-soo)	Seo Eun-kwang
646	February 24, 2024	Kim Bum-soo	Lim Han-byul	One Day (orig. song by Kim Bum-soo)	Seo Eun-kwang
646	February 24, 2024	Kim Bum-soo	6BAND	Appear (orig. song by Kim Bum-soo)	Seo Eun-kwang
646	February 24, 2024	Kim Bum-soo	Forestella (except Ko Woo-rim)	Story Sadder Than Sadness (orig. song by Kim Bum-soo)	Seo Eun-kwang
646	February 24, 2024	Kim Bum-soo	Seo Eun-kwang (BtoB)	Rock Star (orig. song by Kim Bum-soo)	Seo Eun-kwang
647	March 2, 2024	TVXQ	La Poem	Mirotic (orig. song by TVXQ)	Zerobaseone
647	March 2, 2024	TVXQ	Red Velvet – Irene & Seulgi	Wrong Number (orig. song by TVXQ)	Zerobaseone
647	March 2, 2024	TVXQ	KARDI	Rising Sun (orig. song by TVXQ)	Zerobaseone
647	March 2, 2024	TVXQ	ONF	Keep Your Head Down (orig. song by TVXQ)	Zerobaseone
647	March 2, 2024	TVXQ	Jeong Dong-won (JD1)	Hug (orig. song by TVXQ)	Zerobaseone
647	March 2, 2024	TVXQ	Zerobaseone	The Way U Are (orig. song by TVXQ)	Zerobaseone
648	March 9, 2024	SG Wannabe	Jungmo, Woobin & Minhee (Cravity)	La La La (orig. song by SG Wannabe)	Libelante
648	March 9, 2024	SG Wannabe	Vromance (except Yoon Eun-o)	Partner for Life (orig. song by SG Wannabe)	Libelante
648	March 9, 2024	SG Wannabe	Lee Bo-ram & Ahn Sung-hoon	Sin and Punishment (orig. song by SG Wannabe)	Libelante
648	March 9, 2024	SG Wannabe	Libelante (except Kim Ji-hoon)	Timeless (orig. song by SG Wannabe)	Libelante
648	March 9, 2024	SG Wannabe	Yu Tae Pyung-yang & Kim Jun-su	As We Live (orig. song by SG Wannabe)	Libelante
649	March 16, 2024	Trot Best Friends	Park Ku-yoon & Kim Eui-young	A Way Around (orig. song by Noh Sa-yeon)	Han Hye-jin & Shin Yu
649	March 16, 2024	Trot Best Friends	Kim Yong-im & Kim Tae-yeon	A Golden Serenade (orig. song by Nam In-soo)	Han Hye-jin & Shin Yu
649	March 16, 2024	Trot Best Friends	Park Hyun-ho & Kim Joong-yeon	Why Are You Coming Out From There? (orig. song by Young Tak)	Han Hye-jin & Shin Yu
649	March 16, 2024	Trot Best Friends	Cho Hang-jo & Kim Bum-ryong	My Heart Is By Your Side (orig. song by Kim Jeong-soo)	Han Hye-jin & Shin Yu
649	March 16, 2024	Trot Best Friends	Han Hye-jin & Shin Yu	Thorn Bird (orig. song by Patti Kim)	Han Hye-jin & Shin Yu
650	March 23, 2024	Trot Best Friends	Na Tae-ju & Kim Soo-chan	Touch My Body & Ma Boy (orig. songs by Sistar and Sistar19)	Son Tae-jin, Enoch & Shin Seung
650	March 23, 2024	Trot Best Friends	Eun Ga-eun & Kang Hye-yeon	Eternal Companions (orig. song by Na-mi)	Son Tae-jin, Enoch & Shin Seung
650	March 23, 2024	Trot Best Friends	Choi Jin-hee & Jung Mi-ae	Spring Day Goes (orig. song by Baek Seol-hee)	Son Tae-jin, Enoch & Shin Seung
650	March 23, 2024	Trot Best Friends	Hwang Min-woo & Hwang Min-ho	Joy (orig. song by Jung Su-ra)	Son Tae-jin, Enoch & Shin Seung
650	March 23, 2024	Trot Best Friends	Son Tae-jin, Enoch & Shin Seung	Brush (orig. song by Kang Jin)	Son Tae-jin, Enoch & Shin Seung
651	March 30, 2024	Choi Soo-jong	Ali	Loving Us (orig. song by Jo Ha-moon)	Rocky
651	March 30, 2024	Choi Soo-jong	Park Seo-jin	Lady (orig. song by Lee Mi-ja)	Rocky
651	March 30, 2024	Choi Soo-jong	Kim Cho-wol	No One Else Like That (orig. song by Lee Seung-chul)	Rocky
651	March 30, 2024	Choi Soo-jong	Rocky	Sparks (orig. song by Jeon Yeong-rok)	Rocky
651	March 30, 2024	Choi Soo-jong	Kim Yong-pil	Raindrops on the Window (orig. song by The Sunlight Village)	Rocky
652	April 6, 2024	Choi Soo-jong	A.C.E	Pilot (OST by Chris Jung for the drama Pilot)	Kim So-hyun & Son Jun-ho
652	April 6, 2024	Choi Soo-jong	GilguBongu	When the Cold Wind Blows (orig. song by Kim Ji-yeon)	Kim So-hyun & Son Jun-ho
652	April 6, 2024	Choi Soo-jong	Lee Ji-hoon	Reason for Existence (orig. song by Kim Jong-hwan)	Kim So-hyun & Son Jun-ho
652	April 6, 2024	Choi Soo-jong	Forténa	Jealousy (OST by Yoo Seung-beom for the drama Jealousy)	Kim So-hyun & Son Jun-ho
652	April 6, 2024	Choi Soo-jong	Kim So-hyun & Son Jun-ho	First Marriage (orig. song by Jang Yoon-jeong)	Kim So-hyun & Son Jun-ho
653	April 13, 2024	2024 Vocal Queen	Kim Yeon-ji	Please (orig. song by Lee So-ra)	Jeong Sun-ah
653	April 13, 2024	2024 Vocal Queen	Yang Ji-eun	Binari (orig. song by Sim Soo-bong)	Jeong Sun-ah
653	April 13, 2024	2024 Vocal Queen	Park Ki-young	Love Poem (orig. song by IU)	Jeong Sun-ah
653	April 13, 2024	2024 Vocal Queen	Ji Se-hee, Son Seung-yeon, U Sung-eun & Lee Ye-joon	Blue Whale (orig. song by YB)	Jeong Sun-ah
653	April 13, 2024	2024 Vocal Queen	Lee So-jung	Memory of the Wind (orig. song by Naul)	Jeong Sun-ah
653	April 13, 2024	2024 Vocal Queen	Jeong Sun-ah	Into the Unknown (OST by Idina Menzel and Aurora for Frozen II)	Jeong Sun-ah
654	April 20, 2024	Lovers of the Century (Note: Special opening stage performance by Lee Chan-won with his song "Mangwon-dong Blues")	Lee Yong-sik, Lee Su-min (cellist) & Won Hyuk (Father, daughter and son-in-law)	Forever With Me (orig. song by Ahn Sang-soo)	Song Ji-eun & Park We
654	April 20, 2024	Lovers of the Century	Bae Hye-ji & Jo Hang-ri (Couple)	We Need to Talk (orig. song by The Jadu)	Song Ji-eun & Park We
654	April 20, 2024	Lovers of the Century	Seo Jeong-hee & Kim Tae-hyun (lawyer) (Couple)	On a Wonderful Day in October (orig. song by Kim Dong-gyu)	Song Ji-eun & Park We
654	April 20, 2024	Lovers of the Century	Song Ji-eun & Park We (YouTuber) (Couple)	Thanks (orig. song by Kim Dong-ryul)	Song Ji-eun & Park We
654	April 20, 2024	Lovers of the Century	Kim Hye-seon & Stefan (Couple)	Apgujeong Punk (orig. song by Sagging Snail)	Song Ji-eun & Park We
655	April 27, 2024	Kim Kyung-ho	Yoo Hwe-seung (N.Flying)	People Who Make Me Sad (orig. song by Kim Kyung-ho)	DK
655	April 27, 2024	Kim Kyung-ho	Tempest (except Hwarang)	Now (orig. song by Kim Kyung-ho)	DK
655	April 27, 2024	Kim Kyung-ho	Monni	Wine (orig. song by Kim Kyung-ho)	DK
655	April 27, 2024	Kim Kyung-ho	Xdinary Heroes	Forbidden Love (orig. song by Kim Kyung-ho)	DK
655	April 27, 2024	Kim Kyung-ho	DK	My Love in Heaven (orig. song by Kim Kyung-ho)	DK
656	May 4, 2024	Middle-Aged Flowers Special	Hong Seo-beom	Fate in Time (orig. song by Lee Chan-won)	Choi Seung-soo
656	May 4, 2024	Middle-Aged Flowers Special	Kwon In-ha	If I Love Again (orig. song by Do Won-kyung)	Choi Seung-soo
656	May 4, 2024	Middle-Aged Flowers Special	Lee Hyun-woo	To Happy World (orig. song by Hahn Dae-soo)	Choi Seung-soo
656	May 4, 2024	Middle-Aged Flowers Special	Park Nam-jung	As I Told You (orig. song by Kim Sung-jae)	Choi Seung-soo
656	May 4, 2024	Middle-Aged Flowers Special	Shim Shin	Wonderful Confession (orig. song by Yoon Soo-il)	Choi Seung-soo
656	May 4, 2024	Middle-Aged Flowers Special	Choi Seung-soo	Tomboy (orig. song by Hyukoh)	Choi Seung-soo
657	May 11, 2024	Shin Yu & Turns Out I Was in a Coma	Kim Jun-su	Rain of Tears (orig. song by Hong Jin-young)	Son Tae-jin
657	May 11, 2024	Shin Yu & Turns Out I Was in a Coma	KyoungSeo	Laugh Once and Gain Youth (orig. song by Shin Yu)	Son Tae-jin
657	May 11, 2024	Shin Yu & Turns Out I Was in a Coma	La Poem	Hands of a Clock (orig. song by Shin Yu)	Son Tae-jin
657	May 11, 2024	Shin Yu & Turns Out I Was in a Coma	Son Tae-jin	Moon of Seoul (orig. song by Song Ga-in)	Son Tae-jin
657	May 11, 2024	Shin Yu & Turns Out I Was in a Coma	Jung Da-kyung	Sleeping Princess (orig. song by Shin Yu)	Son Tae-jin
658	May 18, 2024	Shin Yu & Turns Out I Was in a Coma	Jung Seo-joo, Bae Ah-hyeon & Oh Yu-jin	Flower Extract (orig. song by Shin Yu)	Rocky
658	May 18, 2024	Shin Yu & Turns Out I Was in a Coma	Park Hyun-ho & Kim Joong-yeon	Jjiniya (orig. song by Young Tak)	Rocky
658	May 18, 2024	Shin Yu & Turns Out I Was in a Coma	Eun Ga-eun	Bad Guy (orig. song by Shin Yu)	Rocky
658	May 18, 2024	Shin Yu & Turns Out I Was in a Coma	Rocky	Shabang, Shabang (orig. song by Park Hyun-bin)	Rocky
658	May 18, 2024	Shin Yu & Turns Out I Was in a Coma	Hong Ja	Thank You (orig. song by Cho Hang-jo)	Rocky
659	May 25, 2024	2024 New Kids on the Masterpieces Special	Hwang Min-ho (Trot prodigy) & Kim Soo-chan	Yearning Song (orig. song by Tae Jin-ah)	Kim Dam-hyeon & Kim Ki-tae & Oh Eun-chul
659	May 25, 2024	2024 New Kids on the Masterpieces Special	Jung Cho-ha (K-Pop prodigy) & Kino (Pentagon)	Baggy Jeans (orig. song by NCT U)	Kim Dam-hyeon & Kim Ki-tae & Oh Eun-chul
659	May 25, 2024	2024 New Kids on the Masterpieces Special	Choi Eun-young (Musical prodigy) & Son Jun-ho	I Am Music (orig. song by Im Tae-kyung)	Kim Dam-hyeon & Kim Ki-tae & Oh Eun-chul
659	May 25, 2024	2024 New Kids on the Masterpieces Special	Gu Min-jeong (Gugak prodigy) & Park Ae-ri	Jindo Arirang & As You Live (Traditional Korean song and orig. song by Cha Ji-yeon)	Kim Dam-hyeon & Kim Ki-tae & Oh Eun-chul
659	May 25, 2024	2024 New Kids on the Masterpieces Special	Kim Dam-hyeon (Violin prodigy) & Kim Ki-tae & Oh Eun-chul (Craxilver)	Start Over (OST by Gaho for Itaewon Class)	Kim Dam-hyeon & Kim Ki-tae & Oh Eun-chul
659	May 25, 2024	2024 New Kids on the Masterpieces Special	Cheon Ji-ho (Cheerleading prodigy) & Kei (Lovelyz)	Password 486 (orig. song by Younha)	Kim Dam-hyeon & Kim Ki-tae & Oh Eun-chul
660	June 1, 2024	Jung Mi-jo	Shin Seung-tae	Love and Seasons (orig. song by Jung Mi-jo)	Kim Yeon-ji
660	June 1, 2024	Jung Mi-jo	Ock Joo-hyun	I Still Remember (orig. song by Jung Mi-jo)	Kim Yeon-ji
660	June 1, 2024	Jung Mi-jo	Kim Dong-hyun	Please Whistle (orig. song by Jung Mi-jo)	Kim Yeon-ji
660	June 1, 2024	Jung Mi-jo	Lee Se-joon (Yurisangja)	Flame (orig. song by Jung Mi-jo)	Kim Yeon-ji
660	June 1, 2024	Jung Mi-jo	Kim Yeon-ji	The Neck of the Rapids (orig. song by Jung Mi-jo)	Kim Yeon-ji
660	June 1, 2024	Jung Mi-jo	Son Seung-yeon	Ah My Love (orig. song by Jung Mi-jo)	Kim Yeon-ji
661	June 8, 2024	Yoon Jong-shin	YUDABINBAND	Highway Romance (orig. song by Yoon Jong-shin)	Tei
661	June 8, 2024	Yoon Jong-shin	Choi Jung-in	Farewell Taxi (orig. song by Kim Yeon-woo)	Tei
661	June 8, 2024	Yoon Jong-shin	Tei	Like It (orig. song by Yoon Jong-shin)	Tei
661	June 8, 2024	Yoon Jong-shin	Paul Blanco (Note: With special guest piano performance by Changmo)	On the Street (orig. song by Sung Si-kyung)	Tei
661	June 8, 2024	Yoon Jong-shin	Jeong Dong-won (JD1)	Instictively (orig. song by Yoon Jong-shin ft. Swings)	Tei
662	June 15, 2024	Yoon Jong-shin	6BAND	Rebirth (orig. song by Yoon Jong-shin)	Jung Joon-il
662	June 15, 2024	Yoon Jong-shin	Heo Sol-ji	Uphill Road (orig. song by Choi Jung-in)	Jung Joon-il
662	June 15, 2024	Yoon Jong-shin	Forténa (except David DQ Lee)	Sending Off (orig. song by Yoon Jong-shin)	Jung Joon-il
662	June 15, 2024	Yoon Jong-shin	Jongho (Ateez)	Things to do Tomorrow (orig. song by Sung Si-kyung)	Jung Joon-il
662	June 15, 2024	Yoon Jong-shin	Jung Joon-il	You Were So Touching (orig. song by Sung Si-kyung)	Jung Joon-il
663	June 22, 2024	Summer Special, Part 1: Luxury Actors	Ahn Se-ha	If I Love Again (orig. song by Do Won-kyung)	Park Ho-san
663	June 22, 2024	Summer Special, Part 1: Luxury Actors	Jung Yi-rang & Kim Won-hoon	The Meaning of You (orig. song by Sanulrim)	Park Ho-san
663	June 22, 2024	Summer Special, Part 1: Luxury Actors	Lee Chul-min	On a Day Like Tonight (orig. song by Park Jeong-woon)	Park Ho-san
663	June 22, 2024	Summer Special, Part 1: Luxury Actors	Jeon Moo-song, Jeon Jin-woo & Kim Mi-rim	The Story of a Couple in Their 60s (orig. song by Kim Kwang-seok)	Park Ho-san
663	June 22, 2024	Summer Special, Part 1: Luxury Actors	Jo Jae-yoon	Story of My Guitar (orig. song by Song Chang-sik)	Park Ho-san
663	June 22, 2024	Summer Special, Part 1: Luxury Actors	Park Ho-san	Because I Love You (orig. song by Yoo Jae-ha)	Park Ho-san
664	June 29, 2024	Summer Special, Part 2: Best Friends	Kim Da-hyun & Aiko Sumita	Pig Rabbit (orig. song by Jang Yoon-jeong)	Jinho & Hui
664	June 29, 2024	Summer Special, Part 2: Best Friends	6BAND & Crack Shot	It's Art (orig. song by Psy)	Jinho & Hui
664	June 29, 2024	Summer Special, Part 2: Best Friends	Jinho & Hui (Pentagon)	Tobacco Shop Girl (orig. song by Song Chang-sik)	Jinho & Hui
664	June 29, 2024	Summer Special, Part 2: Best Friends	Ali & Kim Dong-hyun	Love Wins All (orig. song by IU)	Jinho & Hui
664	June 29, 2024	Summer Special, Part 2: Best Friends	Heo Sol-ji & Navi	Fate (orig. song by Lee Seung-chul)	Jinho & Hui
665	July 6, 2024	Summer Special, Part 2: Best Friends	Lee Solomon & Kim Yu-ha	Walking Along With You (orig. song by Cho Yong-pil)	Son Tae-jin & Jin Won (Libelante)
665	July 6, 2024	Summer Special, Part 2: Best Friends	Lee Ji-hoon & Son Jun-ho	Never Ending Story (orig. song by Boohwal)	Son Tae-jin & Jin Won (Libelante)
665	July 6, 2024	Summer Special, Part 2: Best Friends	Seomoon Tak & Son Seung-yeon	Amateur (orig. song by Lee Seung-chul)	Son Tae-jin & Jin Won (Libelante)
665	July 6, 2024	Summer Special, Part 2: Best Friends	Son Tae-jin & Jin Won (Libelante)	Love is Flower of Life (orig. song by Patti Kim)	Son Tae-jin & Jin Won (Libelante)
665	July 6, 2024	Summer Special, Part 2: Best Friends	Lee Dae-won & Choo Hyuk-jin	Amor Fati (orig. song by Kim Yong-ja)	Son Tae-jin & Jin Won (Libelante)
666	July 13, 2024	Summer Special, Part 3: Comedians	Cho Jin-se	Love Two (orig. song by Yoon Do-hyun)	Kim Ki-ri & Lim Woo-il
666	July 13, 2024	Summer Special, Part 3: Comedians	Shin Yun-seung & Jo Su-yeon	Our Love is Like This (orig. song by Joo Young-hoon & Lee Hye-jin)	Kim Ki-ri & Lim Woo-il
666	July 13, 2024	Summer Special, Part 3: Comedians	Kim Ji-sun & Park Se-mi (comedienne)	Poison (orig. song by Uhm Jung-hwa)	Kim Ki-ri & Lim Woo-il
666	July 13, 2024	Summer Special, Part 3: Comedians	Kim Ki-ri & Lim Woo-il	My Friend (orig. song by Cho PD ft. Insooni)	Kim Ki-ri & Lim Woo-il
666	July 13, 2024	Summer Special, Part 3: Comedians	Lee Yong-sik	Whiskey on the Rock (orig. song by Choi Sung-soo)	Kim Ki-ri & Lim Woo-il
666	July 13, 2024	Summer Special, Part 3: Comedians	Kim Ji-min	Meet Him Among Them (orig. song by Lee Sun-hee)	Kim Ki-ri & Lim Woo-il
667	July 20, 2024	Summer Special, Part 4: Musical Stars with Kim Moon-jung	Son Seung-yeon	The Winner Takes It All (orig. song by ABBA used in Mamma Mia!)	PITTA & Oh Eun-chul (Craxilver)
667	July 20, 2024	Summer Special, Part 4: Musical Stars with Kim Moon-jung	Sandeul	A Passionate Goodbye (orig. song by Toy)	PITTA & Oh Eun-chul (Craxilver)
667	July 20, 2024	Summer Special, Part 4: Musical Stars with Kim Moon-jung	La Poem	Hero & Promising That Day (orig. OSTs for the musical Hero)	PITTA & Oh Eun-chul (Craxilver)
667	July 20, 2024	Summer Special, Part 4: Musical Stars with Kim Moon-jung	Tei	Becoming Dust (orig. song by Kim Kwang-seok)	PITTA & Oh Eun-chul (Craxilver)
667	July 20, 2024	Summer Special, Part 4: Musical Stars with Kim Moon-jung	PITTA & Oh Eun-chul (Craxilver)	The Phantom of the Opera (orig. song for The Phantom of the Opera)	PITTA & Oh Eun-chul (Craxilver)
667	July 20, 2024	Summer Special, Part 4: Musical Stars with Kim Moon-jung	Jung Ji-so & Kei	A Flying Butterfly (orig. song by YB)	PITTA & Oh Eun-chul (Craxilver)
No broadcast on July 27, August 3 and August 10 due to the live coverage of the 2024 Summer Olympics.
668	August 17, 2024	late Pak Kyongni: Remember and Sing	Yang Hee-eun	Evergreen Tree, It's Good & To the Land of Happiness (orig. songs by Yang Hee-eun & Hahn Dae-soo)	No Winner
668	August 17, 2024	late Pak Kyongni: Remember and Sing	STAYC	Cheeky Icy Thang (orig. song by STAYC)	No Winner
668	August 17, 2024	late Pak Kyongni: Remember and Sing	Na Tae-ju	You've Become a Dragon & Ah! Korea (orig. songs by Na Tae-ju & Jung Su-ra)	No Winner
668	August 17, 2024	late Pak Kyongni: Remember and Sing	Yu Tae Pyung-yang & Kim Jun-su	Pledge, Arirang & Aegukga (orig. song by Jung Sung-hwa, traditional folk song & Korean national anthem)	No Winner
668	August 17, 2024	late Pak Kyongni: Remember and Sing	Paul Kim	Every Day, Every Moment (orig. song by Paul Kim)	No Winner
668	August 17, 2024	late Pak Kyongni: Remember and Sing	Kim Yoon-ah	My Rosy Life & Going Home (orig. songs by Kim Yoon-ah)	No Winner
668	August 17, 2024	late Pak Kyongni: Remember and Sing	Lee Chan-won	Flowery Day (orig. song by Lee Chan-won)	No Winner
668	August 17, 2024	late Pak Kyongni: Remember and Sing	Lee Juck	Thigs We Took for Granted, Running on the Sky & Raguyo (orig. songs by Lee Juck & Kang San-eh)	No Winner
669	August 24, 2024	King of Kings Special: 1st Half of 2024	DK & Kim Yeon-ji	Don't Forget Me (orig. song by Baek Ji-young)	Kim Ki-tae (427 points)
669	August 24, 2024	King of Kings Special: 1st Half of 2024	Kim Johan, Muzie & Hanhae	Uptown Funk (orig. song by Mark Ronson ft. Bruno Mars)	Kim Ki-tae (427 points)
669	August 24, 2024	King of Kings Special: 1st Half of 2024	La Poem	Viva la Vida (orig. song by Coldplay)	Kim Ki-tae (427 points)
669	August 24, 2024	King of Kings Special: 1st Half of 2024	Kim Ki-tae	Though I Loved You (orig. song by Kim Kwang-seok)	Kim Ki-tae (427 points)
669	August 24, 2024	King of Kings Special: 1st Half of 2024	Jung Sun-ah	Defying Gravity (orig. song by Idina Menzel & Kristin Chenoweth)	Kim Ki-tae (427 points)
670 (Note: Special opening stage performance by Forestella (except Ko Woo-rim) with the song Piano Man)	August 31, 2024	King of Kings Special: 1st Half of 2024	Libelante (except Kim Ji-hoon)	Playing With Fire (orig. song by Blackpink)	Rocky & BEBE (446 points)
670	August 31, 2024	King of Kings Special: 1st Half of 2024	Jung Dong-ha & Ali	Song of the Wind (orig. song by Cho Yong-pil)	Rocky & BEBE (446 points)
670	August 31, 2024	King of Kings Special: 1st Half of 2024	Son Tae-jin, Enoch & Shin Seung	The Bright Light in the Flower (orig. song by Park Kyung-hee)	Rocky & BEBE (446 points)
670	August 31, 2024	King of Kings Special: 1st Half of 2024	Rocky & BEBE (except Minah and Cheche)	I Am the Best (orig. song by 2NE1)	Rocky & BEBE (446 points)
670	August 31, 2024	King of Kings Special: 1st Half of 2024	HuhYongByul (Huh Gak, Shin Yong-jae & Lim Han-byul)	Snail (orig. song by Panic)	Rocky & BEBE (446 points)
671	September 7, 2024	Lee Soon-jae	Hwang Min-ho	Today is My Youth (orig. song by Kim Yong-im)	Son Tae-jin & Danny Koo
671	September 7, 2024	Lee Soon-jae	Nam Hyun-joon & Park Ae-ri	Short Hair (orig. song by Cho Yong-pil)	Son Tae-jin & Danny Koo
671	September 7, 2024	Lee Soon-jae	Hong Kyung-min	Tatata (orig. song by Kim Kook-hwan)	Son Tae-jin & Danny Koo
671	September 7, 2024	Lee Soon-jae	Son Tae-jin & Danny Koo	My Way (orig. song by Frank Sinatra)	Son Tae-jin & Danny Koo
671	September 7, 2024	Lee Soon-jae	Eun Ga-eun	The Man in the Yellow Shirt (orig. song by Han Myung-sook)	Son Tae-jin & Danny Koo
672	September 14, 2024	Lee Soon-jae	Ben	Goodbye Seoul (orig. song by Lee Mi-ja)	Dami Im
672	September 14, 2024	Lee Soon-jae	Kai	Perfume (orig. song by Lee Dong-won & Park In-soo)	Dami Im
672	September 14, 2024	Lee Soon-jae	Son Seung-yeon	Hymne à l'amour (orig. song by Édith Piaf)	Dami Im
672	September 14, 2024	Lee Soon-jae	Monni	The Song of the Innocent (orig. song by Sumi Jo)	Dami Im
672	September 14, 2024	Lee Soon-jae	Dami Im	Beautiful Country (orig. song by Lee Sun-hee)	Dami Im
673	September 21, 2024	Lee Seung-chul	Park Hyun-ho & Kim Joong-yeon	Today, I (orig. song by Lee Seung-chul)	Jung Joon-il
673	September 21, 2024	Lee Seung-chul	Yoo Hwe-seung (N.Flying)	Amateur (orig. song by Lee Seung-chul)	Jung Joon-il
673	September 21, 2024	Lee Seung-chul	Lim Han-byul	The Last Concert (orig. song by Lee Seung-chul)	Jung Joon-il
673	September 21, 2024	Lee Seung-chul	Lim Jeong-hee & Kim Hee-hyun (ballerino)	Long Day (orig. song by Lee Seung-chul)	Jung Joon-il
673	September 21, 2024	Lee Seung-chul	Jung Joon-il	Never Ending Story (orig. song by Boohwal)	Jung Joon-il
674 (Note: Special opening stage performance by Lee Seung-chul and Hori7on with his song "It's A Rainy Day")	September 28, 2024	Lee Seung-chul	Lee Young-hyun (Big Mama)	Jasmine (orig. song by Lee Seung-chul)	Libelante
674	September 28, 2024	Lee Seung-chul	Son Seung-yeon	Western Sky (orig. song by Lee Seung-chul)	Libelante
674	September 28, 2024	Lee Seung-chul	Kim Na-young	Fate (orig. song by Lee Seung-chul)	Libelante
674	September 28, 2024	Lee Seung-chul	Kim Tae-yeon & Oh Yu-jin	Girls' Generation (orig. song by Lee Seung-chul)	Libelante
674	September 28, 2024	Lee Seung-chul	Libelante (except Kim Ji-hoon)	No One Else Like That (orig. song by Lee Seung-chul)	Libelante
675	October 5, 2024	2024 Armed Forces Day	Min Woo-hyuk	Military Song Medley & Champions (orig. song by Sumi Jo)	No Winner
675	October 5, 2024	2024 Armed Forces Day	TripleS	Girls Never Die & Rising (orig. songs by TripleS)	No Winner
675	October 5, 2024	2024 Armed Forces Day	Woodz & Jung Seung-hwan	Run Across the Sky (orig. song by Lee Juck)	No Winner
675	October 5, 2024	2024 Armed Forces Day	Woodz	Drowning (orig. song by Woodz)	No Winner
675	October 5, 2024	2024 Armed Forces Day	Jung Seung-hwan	If It Is You (orig. song by Jung Seung-hwan)	No Winner
675	October 5, 2024	2024 Armed Forces Day	Koyote	Pure Love (orig. song by Koyote)	No Winner
675	October 5, 2024	2024 Armed Forces Day	Ailee	U & I & Stronger (orig. songs by Ailee)	No Winner
675	October 5, 2024	2024 Armed Forces Day	Young Tak	Form & Jjiniya (orig. songs by Young Tak)	No Winner
675	October 5, 2024	2024 Armed Forces Day	Kim Ji-hoon (Libelante) & Ko Woo-rim (Forestella)	Il Mondo & My Love (orig. songs by Jimmy Fontana and Westlife)	No Winner
675	October 5, 2024	2024 Armed Forces Day	Libelante	On a Wonderful Day in October & Nelle Tue Mani (orig. songs by Kim Dong-gyu and Andrea Bocelli)	No Winner
675	October 5, 2024	2024 Armed Forces Day	Insooni	When The World Calls Your Name & Goose's Dream (orig. songs by Insooni and Carnival)	No Winner
675	October 5, 2024	2024 Armed Forces Day	All Performers	Every Night (orig. song by Insooni)	No Winner
676	October 12, 2024	late Shin Hae-chul	Hong Kyung-min & Kim Dong-wan (Shinhwa)	Lazenca, Save Us (orig. song by N.EX.T)	Crying Nut
676	October 12, 2024	late Shin Hae-chul	Kim Dong-hyun & Lee Byeong-chan	You, Deep In My Heart (orig. song by Shin Hae-chul)	Crying Nut
676	October 12, 2024	late Shin Hae-chul	Forténa	Don't Look So Sad (orig. song by Shin Hae-chul)	Crying Nut
676	October 12, 2024	late Shin Hae-chul	Ahn Shin-ae	Fly Chick Fly (orig. song by N.EX.T)	Crying Nut
676	October 12, 2024	late Shin Hae-chul	Kim Ki-tae	Invitation to Daily Life (orig. song by Shin Hae-chul)	Crying Nut
676	October 12, 2024	late Shin Hae-chul	Crying Nut	To You (orig. song by Shin Hae-chul)	Crying Nut
677	October 19, 2024	Legends Frozen in Time Awaken Special	Jo Jang-hyuk	Love.. That Guy (orig. song by Bobby Kim)	Hyun Jin-young
677	October 19, 2024	Legends Frozen in Time Awaken Special	Kim Seong Myeon (K2)	The More I Love (orig. song by Boohwal)	Hyun Jin-young
677	October 19, 2024	Legends Frozen in Time Awaken Special	Green Zone	On the Street (orig. song by Kim Kwang-seok)	Hyun Jin-young
677	October 19, 2024	Legends Frozen in Time Awaken Special	Hyun Jin-young	With My Love (orig. song by Nam Jin)	Hyun Jin-young
677	October 19, 2024	Legends Frozen in Time Awaken Special	Cleo	Now (orig. song by Fin.K.L)	Hyun Jin-young
678	October 26, 2024	Legends Frozen in Time Awaken Special	Kan Mi-youn & Koh Yoo-jin	I Don't Love You (orig. song by Urban Zakapa)	Kim Jong-seo
678	October 26, 2024	Legends Frozen in Time Awaken Special	Lee Ki-chan & Wax	Don't Leave Me (orig. song by Light and Salt)	Kim Jong-seo
678	October 26, 2024	Legends Frozen in Time Awaken Special	Shim Mina (Note: With special guest performance by Ryu Philip)	I Guess It's Still a Dark Night (orig. song by Jeon Young-rok)	Kim Jong-seo
678	October 26, 2024	Legends Frozen in Time Awaken Special	Kim Jong-seo	Going Round and Round (orig. song by Jeon In-kwon)	Kim Jong-seo
678	October 26, 2024	Legends Frozen in Time Awaken Special	Kim Jang-hoon	Don't You Worry (orig. song by Deulgukhwa)	Kim Jong-seo
679	November 2, 2024	Youth Mic Special (Note: More experienced singers paired up with lesser known bands or groups who debuted around the pandemic and have struggled in the music industry.)	Kim Ki-tae & Soridamgi (pansori production studio)	Spring Rain (orig. song by Park In-soo)	Park Ki-young & Songclaire
679	November 2, 2024	Youth Mic Special	Stephanie & Anarchist (dance group)	Valenti (orig. song by BoA)	Park Ki-young & Songclaire
679	November 2, 2024	Youth Mic Special	Michael K. Lee & C.I.K (brass band)	Can't Take My Eyes Off You (orig. song by Frankie Valli)	Park Ki-young & Songclaire
679	November 2, 2024	Youth Mic Special	Kim Soo-chan & Choi Cha-rang and Romantic Band (jazz band)	Unrequited Love (orig. song by Joo Hyun-mi)	Park Ki-young & Songclaire
679	November 2, 2024	Youth Mic Special	Monni & Kim Na-rim (guitarist)	Butterfly (orig. song by Loveholics)	Park Ki-young & Songclaire
679	November 2, 2024	Youth Mic Special	Park Ki-young & Songclaire (cross-over group)	Hand in Hand (orig. song by Koreana)	Park Ki-young & Songclaire
680	November 9, 2024	Trot Partners Special	Jung Seo-joo	Goose Father (orig. song by Lee Mi-ja)	Lee Soo-yeon
680	November 9, 2024	Trot Partners Special	Oh Yu-jin	Joy (orig. song by Jung Su-ra)	Lee Soo-yeon
680	November 9, 2024	Trot Partners Special	Lim Do-hyung	Heavenly Reunion (orig. song by Choi Jin-hee)	Lee Soo-yeon
680	November 9, 2024	Trot Partners Special	Park Sung-on	You Who Are Going Back To Memories (orig. song by Joo Hyun-mi)	Lee Soo-yeon
680	November 9, 2024	Trot Partners Special	Lee Soo-yeon	You Know My Name (orig. song by Jang Minho)	Lee Soo-yeon
681	November 16, 2024	Trot Partners Special	Shin Seung	Empty Glass (orig. song by Nam Jin)	Ahn Sung-hoon
681	November 16, 2024	Trot Partners Special	Shin Yu	Life (orig. song by Na Hoon-a)	Ahn Sung-hoon
681	November 16, 2024	Trot Partners Special	Son Tae-jin	Woman in the Rain (orig. song by Shin Joong-hyun)	Ahn Sung-hoon
681	November 16, 2024	Trot Partners Special	Ahn Sung-hoon	Spark (orig. song by Kim Bum-ryong)	Ahn Sung-hoon
681	November 16, 2024	Trot Partners Special	Hong Ja	Woman Outside the Window (orig. song by Cho Yong-pil)	Ahn Sung-hoon
682	November 23, 2024	Former vs. Current KBS Announcers Special (Note: Lim Su-min was also a guest but she did not perform.)	Oh Young-sil & Jo Woo-jong	Amor Fati (orig. song by Kim Yon-ja)	Choi Seung-don
682	November 23, 2024	Former vs. Current KBS Announcers Special	Kim Byeong-chan	Farewell of Midnight (orig. song by Bae Ho)	Choi Seung-don
682	November 23, 2024	Former vs. Current KBS Announcers Special	Kim Jong-hyun, Nam Hyun-jong & Lee Yun-jung	Apartment (orig. song by Yoon Soo-il) (Note: They also mixed in fragments of the song Apt. by Rosé ft. Bruno Mars in their performance.)	Choi Seung-don
682	November 23, 2024	Former vs. Current KBS Announcers Special	Lim Sung-min	You Let Me Go With A Smile (orig. song by Lee Eun-ha)	Choi Seung-don
682	November 23, 2024	Former vs. Current KBS Announcers Special	Kim Bo-min & Uhm Ji-in	Pierrot Smiles at Us (orig. song by Kim Wan-sun)	Choi Seung-don
682	November 23, 2024	Former vs. Current KBS Announcers Special	Choi Seung-don	I'm Yours (orig. song by Jason Mraz)	Choi Seung-don
683	November 30, 2024	2024 Ballad War Special	Kim Ki-tae	The Reason I Became A Singer (orig. song by Shin Yong-jae)	Huh Gak
683	November 30, 2024	2024 Ballad War Special	Monday Kiz	Sad Fate (orig. song by Na-mi)	Huh Gak
683	November 30, 2024	2024 Ballad War Special	Lim Han-byul	Love Alone (orig. song by Kim Gun-mo)	Huh Gak
683	November 30, 2024	2024 Ballad War Special	Huh Gak	How Love Is (orig. song by Lee Seung-hwan)	Huh Gak
683	November 30, 2024	2024 Ballad War Special	DK	Standing Under the Shade of a Roadside Tree (orig. song by Lee Moon-sae)	Huh Gak
683	November 30, 2024	2024 Ballad War Special	Shin Yong-jae	Let's Say Goodbye (orig. song by Parc Jae-jung)	Huh Gak
684	December 7, 2024	Noh Sa-yeon & Choi Seung-soo	Woody	A Wish (orig. song by Noh Sa-yeon)	Ali
684	December 7, 2024	Noh Sa-yeon & Choi Seung-soo	H1-Key	Love of Grass (orig. song by Choi Sung-soo)	Ali
684	December 7, 2024	Noh Sa-yeon & Choi Seung-soo	Lee Se-jun (Yurisangja)	Accompanied (orig. song by Choi Sung-soo)	Ali
684	December 7, 2024	Noh Sa-yeon & Choi Seung-soo	Hwang Min-ho	Our Happy Love (orig. song by Choi Sung-soo)	Ali
684	December 7, 2024	Noh Sa-yeon & Choi Seung-soo	Ali	Your Shadow (orig. song by Noh Sa-yeon) (Note: She also mixed in fragments of the song Memory of the musical Cats in her performance.)	Ali
685	December 14, 2024	Noh Sa-yeon & Choi Seung-soo	Bae Ki-sung	Reunion (orig. song by Choi Sung-soo)	Yang Ji-eun
685	December 14, 2024	Noh Sa-yeon & Choi Seung-soo	Kim Yeon-ji	The Meeting (orig. song by Noh Sa-yeon)	Yang Ji-eun
685	December 14, 2024	Noh Sa-yeon & Choi Seung-soo	Yang Ji-eun	The Way To Round And Round (orig. song by Noh Sa-yeon)	Yang Ji-eun
685	December 14, 2024	Noh Sa-yeon & Choi Seung-soo	Crezl	My Heart Is In Here Again (orig. song by Noh Sa-yeon)	Yang Ji-eun
685	December 14, 2024	Noh Sa-yeon & Choi Seung-soo	Ahn Sung-hoon	Whisky On The Rock (orig. song by Choi Sung-soo)	Yang Ji-eun
686	December 21, 2024	Oh My Star #5 Special	Lee So-jung & Kik5o	One's Way Back (orig. song by Pak Sun-zoo)	Choi Jung-won & Son Seung-yeon
686	December 21, 2024	Oh My Star #5 Special	Kim Bum-ryong & Green Zone	Living Like A Man (orig. song by Kim Young-bae)	Choi Jung-won & Son Seung-yeon
686	December 21, 2024	Oh My Star #5 Special	6BAND & Chung Seung-je	Moon of Seoul (orig. song by Kim Gun-mo)	Choi Jung-won & Son Seung-yeon
686	December 21, 2024	Oh My Star #5 Special	Kim Jang-hoon & Eun Ga-eun	Show (orig. song by Kim Won-jun)	Choi Jung-won & Son Seung-yeon
686	December 21, 2024	Oh My Star #5 Special	Choi Jung-won & Son Seung-yeon	You, My Friend (orig. song by Patti Kim)	Choi Jung-won & Son Seung-yeon
687	December 28, 2024	Oh My Star #5 Special	Min Woo-hyuk & Cho Hyung-kyun (Edel Reinklang)	I Will Be a Bird and Fly(orig. song by Songgolmae)	Sohyang & Ahn Shin-ae
687	December 28, 2024	Oh My Star #5 Special	Hyun Jin-young & Nam Hyun-joon	Alley (orig. song by Shinchon Blues)	Sohyang & Ahn Shin-ae
687	December 28, 2024	Oh My Star #5 Special	Monday Kiz & DK	Jasmine (orig. song by Lee Seung-chul)	Sohyang & Ahn Shin-ae
687	December 28, 2024	Oh My Star #5 Special	Ahn Sung-hoon & Park Sung-on	The Bright Light in the Flower (orig. song by Park Kyung-hee)	Sohyang & Ahn Shin-ae
687	December 28, 2024	Oh My Star #5 Special	Sohyang & Ahn Shin-ae	O Holy Night & All I Want for Christmas Is You (orig. songs by John Sullivan Dwight & Mariah Carey)	Sohyang & Ahn Shin-ae

=== 2025 ===
List of episodes aired in 2025

Singers listed in order of performance.

Episode #	Broadcast Date	Legend or Theme	Guest Singers	Songs	Final Winner
No broadcast on January 4 due to the mourning period after the Jeju Air Flight 2216 crash.
688	January 11, 2025	Kim Hae-sook	Sweet Sorrow	I Like You (orig. song by Cho Yong-pil)	Hong Isaac
688	January 11, 2025	Kim Hae-sook	Choi Dae-chul	Spring is Fading (orig. song by Baek Seol-hee)	Hong Isaac
688	January 11, 2025	Kim Hae-sook	Monni	Our Night Is More Beautiful Than Your Day (orig. song by Kona)	Hong Isaac
688	January 11, 2025	Kim Hae-sook	Jeon Yu-jin	Prayer (orig. song by Jeong Il-young)	Hong Isaac
688	January 11, 2025	Kim Hae-sook	Hong Isaac (Note: With special guitar performance by Choo Seung-youp)	On The Street (orig. song by Kim Kwang-seok)	Hong Isaac
689	January 18, 2025	Kim Hae-sook	Jung Ji-so	The Boy in the Yellow Shirt (orig. song by Han Myung-sook)	Jung Young-joo
689	January 18, 2025	Kim Hae-sook	La Poem (except Park Ki-hun)	Grasshopper (orig. song by Su & Jin)	Jung Young-joo
689	January 18, 2025	Kim Hae-sook	Hwang Ga-ram	Love, On Its Solitude (orig. song by Yang Hee-eun)	Jung Young-joo
689	January 18, 2025	Kim Hae-sook	Lim Han-byul	Still Beautiful (orig. song by Toy)	Jung Young-joo
689	January 18, 2025	Kim Hae-sook	Jung Young-joo	My Only Love Gone Away (orig. song by Lim Hee-sook)	Jung Young-joo
690	January 25, 2025	New Year Family Special	Eun Ga-eun & Park Hyun-ho (couple-to-be)	Trust In Me (orig. song by Lim Young-woong)	Ali & Jo Myung-sik
690	January 25, 2025	New Year Family Special	Park Yeong-gyu & Jo Ah-na (father & daughter)	María Elena (orig. song by Lorenzo Barcelata)	Ali & Jo Myung-sik
690	January 25, 2025	New Year Family Special	Ali & Jo Myung-sik (daughter & father)	Soaring (orig. song by Yim Jae-beom)	Ali & Jo Myung-sik
690	January 25, 2025	New Year Family Special	Lee Sang-ho & Kim Ja-yeon & Lee Sang-min (couple & brother/brother-in-law)	Honey (orig. song by Park Ju-hee)	Ali & Jo Myung-sik
690	January 25, 2025	New Year Family Special	Woo Yeon-yi & Marcus Kang (mother & son)	Passion (orig. song by Hyeeunyee)	Ali & Jo Myung-sik
691	February 1, 2025	Second Life Special	Ko Myung-hwan	After Sending You (orig. song by YB)	Kim Jung-hwa
691	February 1, 2025	Second Life Special	Lee Gun-joo	When Time Passes (orig. song by Choi Ho-sub)	Kim Jung-hwa
691	February 1, 2025	Second Life Special	Lee Kyun	Solo (orig. song by Lee Moon-sae)	Kim Jung-hwa
691	February 1, 2025	Second Life Special	Lee Young-ha	Alley (orig. song by Shinchon Blues)	Kim Jung-hwa
691	February 1, 2025	Second Life Special	Kim Byung-hyun	I Loved You (orig. song by Kim Hyun-sik)	Kim Jung-hwa
691	February 1, 2025	Second Life Special	Kim Jung-hwa	I'm A Firefly (orig. song by Hwang Ga-ram)	Kim Jung-hwa
692	February 8, 2025	Sim Soo-bong & Song Ga-in	Hwang Min-ho	Geomungya (orig. song by Song Ga-in)	No Winner
692	February 8, 2025	Sim Soo-bong & Song Ga-in	Lee Su-yeon	Because I'm A Woman (orig. song by Sim Soo-bong)	No Winner
692	February 8, 2025	Sim Soo-bong & Song Ga-in	Hwang Min-ho & Lee Su-yeon	Hundred Years' Life (orig. song by Lee Ae-ran)	No Winner
692	February 8, 2025	Sim Soo-bong & Song Ga-in	Song Ga-in	Be Ga-in (orig. song by Song Ga-in)	No Winner
692	February 8, 2025	Sim Soo-bong & Song Ga-in	Sim Soo-bong	The One I Remember (orig. song by Sim Soo-bong)	No Winner
692	February 8, 2025	Sim Soo-bong & Song Ga-in	Trot Sisters	Play The Music (orig. song by Jang Minho)	No Winner
692	February 8, 2025	Sim Soo-bong & Song Ga-in	Jeon Yu-jin	Weed (orig. song by Na Hoon-a)	No Winner
692	February 8, 2025	Sim Soo-bong & Song Ga-in	Song Ga-in	Firefly (orig. song by Shin Hyung-won)	No Winner
692	February 8, 2025	Sim Soo-bong & Song Ga-in	Ahn Sung-hoon	Sad Love & Music Is My Life (orig. songs by Kim Soo-hee & Lee Mi-ja)	No Winner
692	February 8, 2025	Sim Soo-bong & Song Ga-in	Na Tae-ju	Samba Lady (orig. song by Sul Woon-do)	No Winner
692	February 8, 2025	Sim Soo-bong & Song Ga-in	Sim Soo-bong	Romance Gray & Hymn of Wish (orig. songs by Sim Soo-bong)	No Winner
692	February 8, 2025	Sim Soo-bong & Song Ga-in	Song Ga-in	Mom Arirang (orig. song by Song Ga-in)	No Winner
692	February 8, 2025	Sim Soo-bong & Song Ga-in	Sim Soo-bong & Song Ga-in	I'm In Tears (orig. song by Shin Jae)	No Winner
693	February 15, 2025	Sim Soo-bong & Song Ga-in	Sim Soo-bong	I Hate You (orig. song by Sim Soo-bong)	No Winner
693	February 15, 2025	Sim Soo-bong & Song Ga-in	Song Ga-in	Daedong River of Deep Sorrow & We Met Again (orig. songs by Son In-ho & Joo Hyun-mi)	No Winner
693	February 15, 2025	Sim Soo-bong & Song Ga-in	Song Ga-in & Jo Sung-jae (Gayageum player)	Chilgapsan (orig. song by Joo Byung-sun)	No Winner
693	February 15, 2025	Sim Soo-bong & Song Ga-in	Sim Soo-bong	Out Of The Abyss (orig. song by Sim Soo-bong)	No Winner
693	February 15, 2025	Sim Soo-bong & Song Ga-in	Song Ga-in	Asadal (orig. song by Song Ga-in)	No Winner
693	February 15, 2025	Sim Soo-bong & Song Ga-in	Song Chang-sik & Ham Chun-ho	Why Calling, It Is Love, Peter Piper & Tobacco Shop Girl (orig. songs by Song Chang-sik)	No Winner
693	February 15, 2025	Sim Soo-bong & Song Ga-in	Lee Chan-won	The One I Remember & Fate In Time (orig. songs by Sim Soo-bong & Lee Chan-won)	No Winner
693	February 15, 2025	Sim Soo-bong & Song Ga-in	Song Ga-in	Always (orig. song by Song Ga-in)	No Winner
693	February 15, 2025	Sim Soo-bong & Song Ga-in	Sim Soo-bong	Men Are Ships, Women Are Ports & Million Roses (orig. songs by Sim Soo-bong)	No Winner
694	February 22, 2025	Yoon Soo-il	Crack Shot	Apartment (orig. song by Yoon Soo-il)	Jeon Yu-jin
694	February 22, 2025	Yoon Soo-il	GilguBongu	Mugs of Farewell (orig. song by Yoon Soo-il & Choi Jin-hee)	Jeon Yu-jin
694	February 22, 2025	Yoon Soo-il	Son Seung-yeon	Beautiful (orig. song by Yoon Soo-il)	Jeon Yu-jin
694	February 22, 2025	Yoon Soo-il	Rocky	Wonderful Confession (orig. song by Yoon Soo-il)	Jeon Yu-jin
694	February 22, 2025	Yoon Soo-il	Jeon Yu-jin	Anything But Love (orig. song by Yoon Soo-il)	Jeon Yu-jin
695	March 1, 2025	March First Movement Special	Onewe	Independence Army Song (orig. song by Korean independence movement)	La Poem
695	March 1, 2025	March First Movement Special	Kim Tae-yeon & sEODo Band	Beautiful Country (orig. song by Shin Moon-hee)	La Poem
695	March 1, 2025	March First Movement Special	Kim Dong-hyun	Sol-ah Sol-ah Blue Sol-ah (orig. song by People Who Find Songs)	La Poem
695	March 1, 2025	March First Movement Special	Jung Dong-ha	Women's March (orig. song by Ahn Ye-eun)	La Poem
695	March 1, 2025	March First Movement Special	Kim Ki-tae	Aegukga & Evergreen (orig. songs by Ahn Eak-tai & Yang Hee-eun)	La Poem
695	March 1, 2025	March First Movement Special	La Poem (except Park Ki-hun)	Judgement's Day (OST by Lee Jung-hyun & Joo Won for Bridal Mask)	La Poem
696	March 8, 2025	K-Musical Special	Seven & Jinjin (Astro) (Note: With special guest performance by Victon's Lim Se-jun)	Celebrity (Musical number from Dream High)	Lee Ji-hoon & Son Jun-ho
696	March 8, 2025	K-Musical Special	Choi Jung-won & Jung Young-joo	Fame (Musical number from Fame)	Lee Ji-hoon & Son Jun-ho
696	March 8, 2025	K-Musical Special	Ken (VIXX) & Kei (Lovelyz)	A Whole New World (Musical number from Aladdin)	Lee Ji-hoon & Son Jun-ho
696	March 8, 2025	K-Musical Special	Yang Ji-eun & Kim Da-hyun	Let's Go On The Road & As We Live (Musical numbers from Seopyeonje)	Lee Ji-hoon & Son Jun-ho
696	March 8, 2025	K-Musical Special	Lee Ji-hoon & Son Jun-ho	This Is the Moment (Musical number from Jekyll & Hyde)	Lee Ji-hoon & Son Jun-ho
697	March 15, 2025	Baby Vox (Note: With special guest piano performance by Kim Hyeong-seok during the opening song.)	Onewe	Doll (orig. song by Baby Vox)	EXID
697	March 15, 2025	Baby Vox	Stephanie	Killer (orig. song by Baby Vox)	EXID
697	March 15, 2025	Baby Vox	Jung Seung-won	Why (orig. song by Baby Vox)	EXID
697	March 15, 2025	Baby Vox	6BAND	What Should I Do (orig. song by Baby Vox)	EXID
697	March 15, 2025	Baby Vox	EXID	Get Up (orig. song by Baby Vox)	EXID
698	March 22, 2025	Yoon Myung-seon	Song Da-hye	Oh My Goodness (orig. song by Jang Yoon-jeong)	Zo Zazz
698	March 22, 2025	Yoon Myung-seon	Cravity	Rokkugo (orig. song by Super Junior-T)	Zo Zazz
698	March 22, 2025	Yoon Myung-seon	Choi Jung-in & Ra.D	Please Don't Leave (orig. song by Yoon Mi-rae)	Zo Zazz
698	March 22, 2025	Yoon Myung-seon	Lyn	Mom Arirang (orig. song by Song Ga-in)	Zo Zazz
698	March 22, 2025	Yoon Myung-seon	Zo Zazz	The Western Sky (orig. song by Lee Seung-chul)	Zo Zazz
699	March 29, 2025	Yoon Myung-seon	Onewe	Flying Girl (orig. song by Magolpy)	Shin Seung-tae & Choi Su-ho
699	March 29, 2025	Yoon Myung-seon	Hwang Chi-yeul	Honey (orig. song by Kim Jang-hoon)	Shin Seung-tae & Choi Su-ho
699	March 29, 2025	Yoon Myung-seon	Shin Yu	Black Glasses (orig. song by Eru ft. Daylight)	Shin Seung-tae & Choi Su-ho
699	March 29, 2025	Yoon Myung-seon	La Poem (except Park Ki-hun)	A Psalm of Life (orig. song by Lim Young-woong)	Shin Seung-tae & Choi Su-ho
699	March 29, 2025	Yoon Myung-seon	Shin Seung-tae & Choi Su-ho	Sseurirang (orig. song by Yoo Ji-na)	Shin Seung-tae & Choi Su-ho
700	April 5, 2025	700th Episode Special: 7 Legends: The Next Wave	Shin Dong-yup, Lee Chan-won, Kim Jun-hyun & HuhYongByul (Huh Gak, Shin Yong-jae & Lim Han-byul) (GUESTS)	Old Love (orig. song by Lee Moon-sae)	No Winner
700	April 5, 2025	700th Episode Special: 7 Legends: The Next Wave	Yoon Jong-shin (LEGEND)	Like It & Highway Romance (orig. songs by Yoon Jong-shin)	No Winner
700	April 5, 2025	700th Episode Special: 7 Legends: The Next Wave	Gummy (LEGEND)	Love in the Moonlight & I Loved... Have No Regrets (orig. songs by Gummy)	No Winner
700	April 5, 2025	700th Episode Special: 7 Legends: The Next Wave	Jung Joon-il (GUEST)	Annie (orig. song by Yoon Jong-shin)	No Winner
700	April 5, 2025	700th Episode Special: 7 Legends: The Next Wave	Yoon Jong-shin & Jung Joon-il	Horse Tail (orig. song by Yoon Jong-shin)	No Winner
700	April 5, 2025	700th Episode Special: 7 Legends: The Next Wave	Dynamic Duo (GUESTS)	Go Back, Attendance Check & Fireworks (orig. songs by Dynamic Duo)	No Winner
700	April 5, 2025	700th Episode Special: 7 Legends: The Next Wave	Gummy & Dynamic Duo	Smoke (orig. song by Dynamic Duo)	No Winner
700	April 5, 2025	700th Episode Special: 7 Legends: The Next Wave	Lena Park (GUEST)	In Coincidence & Missing Child (orig. songs by Lee Chong-son & Lena Park)	No Winner
700	April 5, 2025	700th Episode Special: 7 Legends: The Next Wave	The Blue (LEGENDS)	Good Love, Feeling Only You & With You (orig. songs by The Blue)	No Winner
700	April 5, 2025	700th Episode Special: 7 Legends: The Next Wave	Choi Baek-ho (LEGEND)	About Romance (orig. song by Choi Baek-ho)	No Winner
701	April 12, 2025	700th Episode Special: 7 Legends: The Next Wave	Choi Baek-ho	Run (orig. song by Choi Baek-ho)	No Winner
701	April 12, 2025	700th Episode Special: 7 Legends: The Next Wave	Choi Baek-ho & Roy Kim	My Heart Is Lost (orig. song by Choi Baek-ho)	No Winner
701	April 12, 2025	700th Episode Special: 7 Legends: The Next Wave	Roy Kim (GUEST)	As Is (orig. song by Roy Kim)	No Winner
701	April 12, 2025	700th Episode Special: 7 Legends: The Next Wave	YB (LEGENDS)	Orchid & I'm Cool (orig. songs by YB)	No Winner
701	April 12, 2025	700th Episode Special: 7 Legends: The Next Wave	Choi Baek-ho	In Front Of The Post Office In Autumn (orig. song by Yoon Do-hyun)	No Winner
701	April 12, 2025	700th Episode Special: 7 Legends: The Next Wave	Touched (GUESTS)	Highlight & Stand Up! (orig. songs by Touched)	No Winner
701	April 12, 2025	700th Episode Special: 7 Legends: The Next Wave	YB & Yun Min (Touched)	Peppermint Candy (orig. song by YB)	No Winner
701	April 12, 2025	700th Episode Special: 7 Legends: The Next Wave	YB	Blue Whale (orig. song by YB)	No Winner
701	April 12, 2025	700th Episode Special: 7 Legends: The Next Wave	Jaurim (LEGEND)	Magic Carpet Ride & Twenty-Five, Twenty-One (orig. songs by Jaurim)	No Winner
701	April 12, 2025	700th Episode Special: 7 Legends: The Next Wave	Kim Chang-wan Band (LEGEND) (Note: With special guest appearance by actor Kim Jae-wook to introduce the band.)	Youth, I Can't Remember Right Now, Please, Please & Naughty Boy (orig. songs by Sanulrim)	No Winner
702	April 19, 2025	Kim Hyun-chul, Yoon Sang & Lee Hyun-woo	Kei & Ryu Su-jeong (Lovelyz)	The Day After You Left (orig. song by Lee Hyun-woo)	Soran
702	April 19, 2025	Kim Hyun-chul, Yoon Sang & Lee Hyun-woo	Dragon Pony	The Girl In My Memories (orig. song by Hwang Chi-hun)	Soran
702	April 19, 2025	Kim Hyun-chul, Yoon Sang & Lee Hyun-woo	Ahn Shin-ae & Zo Zazz	Don't Forget (orig. song by Jang Pil-soon)	Soran
702	April 19, 2025	Kim Hyun-chul, Yoon Sang & Lee Hyun-woo	Soran	You're Acting Strange (orig. song by Kim Hyun-chul)	Soran
702	April 19, 2025	Kim Hyun-chul, Yoon Sang & Lee Hyun-woo	Lim Han-byul	The Shadow of Parting (orig. song by Yoon Sang)	Soran
703	April 26, 2025	Kim Hyun-chul, Yoon Sang & Lee Hyun-woo	Hwang Chi-yeul	Ah-Choo (orig. song by Lovelyz)	Lee Seok-hoon
703	April 26, 2025	Kim Hyun-chul, Yoon Sang & Lee Hyun-woo	Jo Jung-min	Dream (orig. song by Lee Hyun-woo)	Lee Seok-hoon
703	April 26, 2025	Kim Hyun-chul, Yoon Sang & Lee Hyun-woo	Jung Seung-won	I'm So Happy (orig. song by Lee So-ra)	Lee Seok-hoon
703	April 26, 2025	Kim Hyun-chul, Yoon Sang & Lee Hyun-woo	Yoo Hwe-seung (N.Flying)	The Downfall Of Moon (orig. song by Kim Hyun-chul)	Lee Seok-hoon
703	April 26, 2025	Kim Hyun-chul, Yoon Sang & Lee Hyun-woo	Lee Seok-hoon (SG Wannabe)	I Have To Forget You (orig. song by Lee Hyun-woo)	Lee Seok-hoon
704	May 3, 2025	Joo Hyun-mi	Kim Soo-chan	We Met Again (orig. song by Joo Hyun-mi)	Lee Jung
704	May 3, 2025	Joo Hyun-mi	Son Tae-jin	Itaewon Love Song (orig. song by Joo Hyun-mi)	Lee Jung
704	May 3, 2025	Joo Hyun-mi	Kwak Young-kwang	Crying And Regretting (orig. song by Joo Hyun-mi)	Lee Jung
704	May 3, 2025	Joo Hyun-mi	Lee Jung (Note: Singing under his trot stage name, Cheon Rok-dam)	Tearful Blues (orig. song by Joo Hyun-mi)	Lee Jung
704	May 3, 2025	Joo Hyun-mi	Kim Jun-su	Yeongdong Bridge in the Rain (orig. song by Joo Hyun-mi)	Lee Jung
705	May 10, 2025	Joo Hyun-mi	Zo Zazz	You Who Go To Memories (orig. song by Joo Hyun-mi)	Hong Ji-min
705	May 10, 2025	Joo Hyun-mi	Hong Kyung-min & Eunsubro	Wait (orig. song by Joo Hyun-mi)	Hong Ji-min
705	May 10, 2025	Joo Hyun-mi	O.A.Be	That Guy from Sinsa-dong (orig. song by Joo Hyun-mi)	Hong Ji-min
705	May 10, 2025	Joo Hyun-mi	Hong Ji-min	Tears Of A Woman (orig. song by Joo Hyun-mi)	Hong Ji-min
705	May 10, 2025	Joo Hyun-mi	Enoch	Secret Admirer (orig. song by Joo Hyun-mi)	Hong Ji-min
706	May 17, 2025	Oh My Star #6 Special	Hong Ja & Lee Su-yeon	My Only Love Gone Away (orig. song by Lim Hee-sook)	Lee Seung-gi & Lee Hong-gi (418 points)
706	May 17, 2025	Oh My Star #6 Special	Kim Jun-su & Choi Soo-ho	Whale Hunting (orig. song by Song Chang-sik)	Lee Seung-gi & Lee Hong-gi (418 points)
706	May 17, 2025	Oh My Star #6 Special	Park Wan-kyu & Baek Chung-kang	Rain And You (orig. song by Park Joong-hoon)	Lee Seung-gi & Lee Hong-gi (418 points)
706	May 17, 2025	Oh My Star #6 Special	Lee Seung-gi & Lee Hong-gi (F.T. Island)	Drowning (orig. song by Woodz)	Lee Seung-gi & Lee Hong-gi (418 points)
706	May 17, 2025	Oh My Star #6 Special	Choi Sung-soo & Ahn Sung-hoon	Making Memories (orig. song by Kim Hyun-sik)	Lee Seung-gi & Lee Hong-gi (418 points)
707	May 24, 2025	Oh My Star #6 Special	Ha Do-kwon & Lee AReum-sol	Consolation (orig. song by Yim Jae-beom)	Lee Young-hyun & Son Seung-yeon (429 points)
707	May 24, 2025	Oh My Star #6 Special	Kim Ki-tae & La Poem (except Park Ki-hun)	Anyhow Song (orig. song by Seo Taiji and Boys)	Lee Young-hyun & Son Seung-yeon (429 points)
707	May 24, 2025	Oh My Star #6 Special	Kim Jung-mo & Park Si-hwan	Forever (orig. song by Choi Jin-young)	Lee Young-hyun & Son Seung-yeon (429 points)
707	May 24, 2025	Oh My Star #6 Special	Lee Young-hyun (Big Mama) & Son Seung-yeon	I'll Get Over You (orig. song by YB)	Lee Young-hyun & Son Seung-yeon (429 points)
707	May 24, 2025	Oh My Star #6 Special	BMK & Zo Zazz	It's Gonna Be Rolling (orig. song by Park Hyo-shin & Lee So-ra)	Lee Young-hyun & Son Seung-yeon (429 points)
708	May 31, 2025	Rising Entertainment Stars Special	Mimiminu (YouTuber)	Sunset Glow (Remake by BigBang of orig. song by Lee Moon-sae)	Song Pil-geun & Na Hyun-young
708	May 31, 2025	Rising Entertainment Stars Special	Yuk Jun-seo (model/actor/former UDT member)	That I Was Once By Your Side (orig. song by Toy)	Song Pil-geun & Na Hyun-young
708	May 31, 2025	Rising Entertainment Stars Special	Kim Dae-ho (announcer)	A Flying Butterfly (orig. song by YB)	Song Pil-geun & Na Hyun-young
708	May 31, 2025	Rising Entertainment Stars Special	Hwang Dong-joo (actor)	My Love Is Too Distant (orig. song by Lee Kwang-jo)	Song Pil-geun & Na Hyun-young
708	May 31, 2025	Rising Entertainment Stars Special	Uhm Ji-in & Hong Ju-yeon (Note: With special guest performance by Park Chul-kyu) (announcers)	Crazy (orig. song by Son Dam-bi)	Song Pil-geun & Na Hyun-young
708	May 31, 2025	Rising Entertainment Stars Special	Song Pil-geun & Na Hyun-young (Note: With special guest performance by Park Eun-young) (comedians)	Sudden Shower (OST by Eclipse for Lovely Runner)	Song Pil-geun & Na Hyun-young
709	June 7, 2025	"Bottom of the 9th, 2 Outs" Special	Lee Dae-hyung	The Last Match (orig. song by Kim Min-kyo)	Rhee Dae-eun
709	June 7, 2025	"Bottom of the 9th, 2 Outs" Special	Yoo Hee-kwan	Jinttobaegi (orig. song by Lee Sung-woo)	Rhee Dae-eun
709	June 7, 2025	"Bottom of the 9th, 2 Outs" Special	Park Yong-taik	Appear (orig. song by Kim Bum-soo)	Rhee Dae-eun
709	June 7, 2025	"Bottom of the 9th, 2 Outs" Special	Kim Tae-kyun	Apartment (orig. song by Yoon Soo-il)	Rhee Dae-eun
709	June 7, 2025	"Bottom of the 9th, 2 Outs" Special	Kim Byung-hyun	To Love (orig. song by Lee Jeong-seok)	Rhee Dae-eun
709	June 7, 2025	"Bottom of the 9th, 2 Outs" Special	Rhee Dae-eun	Forbidden Love (orig. song by Kim Kyung-ho)	Rhee Dae-eun
710	June 14, 2025	"Nuna, Trust Me Once" Special	Shim Mina & Ryu Phillip	Now (orig. song by Seoul Family)	Park Ae-ri & Nam Hyun-joon
710	June 14, 2025	"Nuna, Trust Me Once" Special	Cha Ji-yeon & Yoon Tae-on (musical actor)	Please (orig. song by Lee So-ra)	Park Ae-ri & Nam Hyun-joon
710	June 14, 2025	"Nuna, Trust Me Once" Special	Lim Jeong-hee & Kim Hee-hyun (ballerino)	Back In Time (orig. song by Lyn)	Park Ae-ri & Nam Hyun-joon
710	June 14, 2025	"Nuna, Trust Me Once" Special	Eun Ga-eun & Park Hyun-ho	Lady In The Rain (orig. song by Add4)	Park Ae-ri & Nam Hyun-joon
710	June 14, 2025	"Nuna, Trust Me Once" Special	Park Ae-ri & Nam Hyun-joon	Tobacco Shop Girl (orig. song by Song Chang-sik)	Park Ae-ri & Nam Hyun-joon
710	June 14, 2025	"Nuna, Trust Me Once" Special	Kim Sa-eun & Sung-min	Partner (orig. song by Nam Jin)	Park Ae-ri & Nam Hyun-joon
711	June 21, 2025	2025 APEC Gyeongju Special	Zo Zazz	Hand In Hand (orig. song by Koreana)	No Winner
711	June 21, 2025	2025 APEC Gyeongju Special	KiiiKiii	I Do Me (orig. song by KiiiKiii)	No Winner
711	June 21, 2025	2025 APEC Gyeongju Special	Zo Zazz	Don't You Know (Remake by Zo Zazz of orig. song by Davichi)	No Winner
711	June 21, 2025	2025 APEC Gyeongju Special	Jeong Dong-won	Heung! (orig. song by Jeong Dong-won)	No Winner
711	June 21, 2025	2025 APEC Gyeongju Special	Hwasa	I Love My Body & María (orig. songs by Hwasa)	No Winner
711	June 21, 2025	2025 APEC Gyeongju Special	Song So-hee	My Country, Korea & Odolttogi (orig. songs by Song So-hee)	No Winner
711	June 21, 2025	2025 APEC Gyeongju Special	Lee Seung-yoon	Waterfall & Pokzook Time (orig. songs by Lee Seung-yoon)	No Winner
711	June 21, 2025	2025 APEC Gyeongju Special	Ateez	Ice On My Teeth & The Real (orig. songs by Ateez)	No Winner
711	June 21, 2025	2025 APEC Gyeongju Special	g.o.d (except Yoon Kye-sang)	Road, Friday Night & One Candle (orig. songs by g.o.d)	No Winner
711	June 21, 2025	2025 APEC Gyeongju Special	Psy	That That & It's Art (orig. songs by Psy)	No Winner
712	June 28, 2025	2025 King of Kings Special	Lee Seung-gi & Lee Hong-gi	A Gale (orig. song by Ryu Jung-seok)	Zo Zazz (427 points)
712	June 28, 2025	2025 King of Kings Special	Son Tae-jin & Jeon Yu-jin	Beautiful Woman (orig. song by Shin Jung Hyun & Yup Juns)	Zo Zazz (427 points)
712	June 28, 2025	2025 King of Kings Special	Ali	Chandelier (orig. song by Sia)	Zo Zazz (427 points)
712	June 28, 2025	2025 King of Kings Special	Choi Jung-won & Son Seung-yeon	Queen of the Night (orig. song by Whitney Houston)	Zo Zazz (427 points)
712	June 28, 2025	2025 King of Kings Special	Zo Zazz	Twenty-Five, Twenty-One (orig. song by Jaurim)	Zo Zazz (427 points)
713 (Note: With special guest performance by Forestella with Lady Gaga's Abracadabra)	July 5, 2025	2025 King of Kings Special	HuhYongByul (Huh Gak, Shin Yong-jae & Lim Han-byul)	Good Day (orig. song by IU)	Jung Joon-il (429 points)
713	July 5, 2025	2025 King of Kings Special	Shin Seung-tae & Choi Su-ho	Fireworks (orig. song by Oxen'80)	Jung Joon-il (429 points)
713	July 5, 2025	2025 King of Kings Special	La Poem (except Park Ki-hun)	The Leopard of Kilimanjaro (orig. song by Cho Yong-pil)	Jung Joon-il (429 points)
713	July 5, 2025	2025 King of Kings Special	Sohyang, Yang Dong-geun & Zai.Ro	Gangsta's Paradise (orig. song by Coolio ft. L.V.)	Jung Joon-il (429 points)
713	July 5, 2025	2025 King of Kings Special	Jung Joon-il	How Love Is (orig. song by Lee Seung-hwan)	Jung Joon-il (429 points)
714	July 12, 2025	lates Song Dae-kwan & Hyun Cheol	Jin Hae-sung	Four Beats (orig. song by Song Dae-kwan)	Na Tae-ju (379 points)
714	July 12, 2025	lates Song Dae-kwan & Hyun Cheol	Eun Ga-eun & Park Hyun-ho	Love Is Like A Butterfly (orig. song by Hyun Cheol)	Na Tae-ju (379 points)
714	July 12, 2025	lates Song Dae-kwan & Hyun Cheol	Kim Eui-young	Your Name (orig. song by Hyun Cheol)	Na Tae-ju (379 points)
714	July 12, 2025	lates Song Dae-kwan & Hyun Cheol	Na Tae-ju	Hit Song (orig. song by Song Dae-kwan)	Na Tae-ju (379 points)
714	July 12, 2025	lates Song Dae-kwan & Hyun Cheol	Lee Su-yeon	Garden Balsam Love (orig. song by Hyun Cheol)	Na Tae-ju (379 points)
715	July 19, 2025	lates Song Dae-kwan & Hyun Cheol	Enoch	Coming Sunny Days (orig. song by Song Dae-kwan)	Hwanhee (405 points)
715	July 19, 2025	lates Song Dae-kwan & Hyun Cheol	Choi Su-ho	One Ticket (orig. song by Song Dae-kwan)	Hwanhee (405 points)
715	July 19, 2025	lates Song Dae-kwan & Hyun Cheol	Hwang Min-ho	Give Me Back My Youth (orig. song by Hyun Cheol)	Hwanhee (405 points)
715	July 19, 2025	lates Song Dae-kwan & Hyun Cheol	Hwanhee	My Soonie (orig. song by Song Dae-kwan)	Hwanhee (405 points)
715	July 19, 2025	lates Song Dae-kwan & Hyun Cheol	Lee Ji-hoon	Thinking of You Whenever Wherever (orig. song by Hyun Cheol)	Hwanhee (405 points)
No broadcast on July 26 as the episode could not be taped due to heavy rains.
716	August 2, 2025	2025 Rock Festival in Ulsan	Seomoon Tak	All You Need Is Love & Turn On The Radio Loudly (orig. songs by Seomoon Tak & Sinawe)	No Winner
716	August 2, 2025	2025 Rock Festival in Ulsan	Jannabi	Grippin' The Green & Summer (orig. songs by Jannabi)	No Winner
716	August 2, 2025	2025 Rock Festival in Ulsan	Cherry Filter	Flying Duck & Must (orig. songs by Cherry Filter & Magma)	No Winner
716	August 2, 2025	2025 Rock Festival in Ulsan	F.T. Island (except Choi Min-hwan)	Thunderstorm, Champagne, I Hope, Freedom, Love Sick, & That's My World (orig. songs by F.T. Island & Deulgukhwa)	No Winner
716	August 2, 2025	2025 Rock Festival in Ulsan	Jeon In-kwon	Don't Worry, Going Round and Round, & March (orig. songs by Jeon In-kwon)	No Winner
717	August 9, 2025	2025 Rock Festival in Ulsan	Cherry Filter	Happy Day & Sweet Little Kitty (orig. songs by Cherry Filter)	No Winner
717	August 9, 2025	2025 Rock Festival in Ulsan	Seomoon Tak	Love, Never Fade & Chain (orig. songs by Seomoon Tak)	No Winner
717	August 9, 2025	2025 Rock Festival in Ulsan	Touched	Firepoem & Ruby (orig. songs by Touched)	No Winner
717	August 9, 2025	2025 Rock Festival in Ulsan	Touched & Jannabi	Baby I Need You (orig. song by Jannabi)	No Winner
717	August 9, 2025	2025 Rock Festival in Ulsan	Jannabi	For Lovers Who Hesitate, All The Boys And Girls, Pt. 1: Birdman & What's Up (orig. songs by Jannabi & 4 Non Blondes)	No Winner
717	August 9, 2025	2025 Rock Festival in Ulsan	Kim Chang-wan Band & Jannabi	Dreams, Books, Power, and Walls (orig. song by Jannabi)	No Winner
717	August 9, 2025	2025 Rock Festival in Ulsan	Kim Chang-wan Band	Spread Silk On My Heart & Already Now (orig. songs by Sanulrim)	No Winner
717	August 9, 2025	2025 Rock Festival in Ulsan	All Performers (except Jeon In-kwon and F.T. Island)	The Rascal & Let's Ride a Bicycle With A Guitar (orig. songs by Sanulrim)	No Winner
718	August 16, 2025	80th National Liberation Day of Korea Special	Bae Il-ho	Be Strong Geum-seun (orig. song by Hyun In)	Jin Sung (405 points)
718	August 16, 2025	80th National Liberation Day of Korea Special	Kim Yong-im	The Ferry To My Hometown (orig. song by Lee In-kwon)	Jin Sung (405 points)
718	August 16, 2025	80th National Liberation Day of Korea Special	Hyun Sook	Ulleung-do Twist (orig. song by Lee Sisters)	Jin Sung (405 points)
718	August 16, 2025	80th National Liberation Day of Korea Special	Kim Bum-ryong	Site (orig. song by Shin Hyung-won)	Jin Sung (405 points)
718	August 16, 2025	80th National Liberation Day of Korea Special	Jin Sung	Hundreds Of Years (orig. song by Cho Yong-pil)	Jin Sung (405 points)
718	August 16, 2025	80th National Liberation Day of Korea Special	Seol Woon-do	Beautiful Land (orig. song by Shin Joong-hyun)	Jin Sung (405 points)
719	August 23, 2025	The Blue	Tei	Good Love (orig. song by Kim Min-jong)	Libelante (397 points)
719	August 23, 2025	The Blue	Ken (VIXX) & Jinho (Pentagon)	To Be In Love (orig. song by Son Ji-chang)	Libelante (397 points)
719	August 23, 2025	The Blue	Libelante	My Own Secret (orig. song by Son Ji-chang)	Libelante (397 points)
719	August 23, 2025	The Blue	Ji Se-hee, Son Seung-yeon, U Sung-eun & Lee Ye-joon	Endless Love (orig. song by Kim Min-jong)	Libelante (397 points)
719	August 23, 2025	The Blue	Sandeul (B1A4)	Feeling Only You (orig. song by The Blue)	Libelante (397 points)
720	August 30, 2025	Lim Young-woong & Friends	Lim Young-woong	Rainbow (orig. song by Lim Young-woong)	No Winner
720	August 30, 2025	Lim Young-woong & Friends	No Brain	You Fell In Love With Me & Rain And You (orig. songs by No Brain & Park Joong-hoon)	No Winner
720	August 30, 2025	Lim Young-woong & Friends	Jeon Jong-hyuk	Trust In Me (orig. song by Lim Young-woong)	No Winner
720	August 30, 2025	Lim Young-woong & Friends	Lim Young-woong & Jeon Jong-hyuk	My Starry Love (orig. song by Lem Young-woong)	No Winner
720	August 30, 2025	Lim Young-woong & Friends	Jeon Jong-hyuk	I Don't Know Anything But Love (orig. song by Sim Soo-bong)	No Winner
720	August 30, 2025	Lim Young-woong & Friends	Lim Young-woong	Eternal Moment & Relieved (orig. songs by Lim Young-woong & Lee Juck)	No Winner
720	August 30, 2025	Lim Young-woong & Friends	Lee Juck	No More Drinks, Running On The Sky & Left-Handed (orig. songs by Lee Juck & Panic)	No Winner
721	September 6, 2025	Lim Young-woong & Friends	Choi Yu-ree	Forest & Our Blues, Our Life (orig. songs by Choi Yu-ree & Lim Young-woong)	No Winner
721	September 6, 2025	Lim Young-woong & Friends	Lyn	Cinema Paradise & Magic Lily (orig. songs by Lyn & Nam Jin)	No Winner
721	September 6, 2025	Lim Young-woong & Friends	Lim Young-woong & Lyn	So Painful (orig. song by Pateko ft. Kid White & Milena)	No Winner
721	September 6, 2025	Lim Young-woong & Friends	Lyn	Back In Time (orig. song by Lyn)	No Winner
721	September 6, 2025	Lim Young-woong & Friends	Roy Kim	If You Ask Me What Love Is & Love Always Runs Away (orig. songs by Roy Kim & Lim Young-woong)	No Winner
721	September 6, 2025	Lim Young-woong & Friends	Lim Young-woong	Only Then (orig. song by Roy Kim)	No Winner
721	September 6, 2025	Lim Young-woong & Friends	Lim Young-woong & Roy Kim	Melody For You (orig. song by Lim Young-woong)	No Winner
721	September 6, 2025	Lim Young-woong & Friends	Zo Zazz	If We Ever Meet Again (orig. song by Lim Young-woong)	No Winner
721	September 6, 2025	Lim Young-woong & Friends	Lim Young-woong	You And I & A Psalm Of Life (orig. songs by Sorisae & Lim Young-woong)	No Winner
722	September 13, 2025	Lee Young-ae	Cha Ji-yeon & Kim Da-hyun	Onara & Hamangyeon (OSTs for Jewel in the Palace)	Forestella (399 points)
722	September 13, 2025	Lee Young-ae	6BAND	One Fine Spring Day (orig. song by Kim Yuna)	Forestella (399 points)
722	September 13, 2025	Lee Young-ae	STAYC	Red Shoes Girl (orig. song by Nam Il-hae)	Forestella (399 points)
722	September 13, 2025	Lee Young-ae	Forestella	Flower Vase (orig. song by Yang Hee-eun)	Forestella (399 points)
722	September 13, 2025	Lee Young-ae	W24	Shampoo Fairy (orig. song by Light & Salt)	Forestella (399 points)
722	September 13, 2025	Lee Young-ae	Hong Kyung-min	Time Of Our Life (orig. song by Day6)	Forestella (399 points)
723	September 20, 2025	Shin Seung-hun	Huh Gak	Invisible Love (orig. song by Shin Seung-hun)	Daybreak (417 points)
723	September 20, 2025	Shin Seung-hun	Zo Zazz	Reflection Of You In Your Smile (orig. song by Shin Seung-hun)	Daybreak (417 points)
723	September 20, 2025	Shin Seung-hun	Ahn Shin-ae	My Way Of Loving You (orig. song by Shin Seung-hun)	Daybreak (417 points)
723	September 20, 2025	Shin Seung-hun	Young Posse	Romeo And Juliet (orig. song by Shin Seung-hun)	Daybreak (417 points)
723	September 20, 2025	Shin Seung-hun	Daybreak (except Jung Yu-jong)	Just Like First Sight (orig. song by Shin Seung-hun)	Daybreak (417 points)
724	September 27, 2025	Shin Seung-hun	Ji Se-hee, Son Seung-yeon, U Sung-eun & Lee Ye-joon	You're Just At A Higher Place Than Me (orig. song by Shin Seung-hun)	You Chae-hoon (La Poem) (423 points)
724	September 27, 2025	Shin Seung-hun	Jung Seung-won	Mom (orig. song by Shin Seung-hun)	You Chae-hoon (La Poem) (423 points)
724	September 27, 2025	Shin Seung-hun	Lim Han-byul	I Believe (orig. song by Shin Seung-hun)	You Chae-hoon (La Poem) (423 points)
724	September 27, 2025	Shin Seung-hun	Jung Joon-il	I'm Going (orig. song by Shin Seung-hun)	You Chae-hoon (La Poem) (423 points)
724	September 27, 2025	Shin Seung-hun	You Chae-hoon (La Poem)	After A Long Time (orig. song by Shin Seung-hun)	You Chae-hoon (La Poem) (423 points)
725	October 4, 2025	Lee Jung-hyun	Kim Ki-tae	Ari Ari (orig. song by Lee Jung-hyun)	Jo Kwon (417 points)
725	October 4, 2025	Lee Jung-hyun	Stephanie	You (orig. song by Lee Jung-hyun)	Jo Kwon (417 points)
725	October 4, 2025	Lee Jung-hyun	Chuu	Joolae (Give To You) (orig. song by Lee Jung-hyun)	Jo Kwon (417 points)
725	October 4, 2025	Lee Jung-hyun	Jo Kwon (2AM)	Change (orig. song by Lee Jung-hyun)	Jo Kwon (417 points)
725	October 4, 2025	Lee Jung-hyun	Close Your Eyes	Crazy (orig. song by Lee Jung-hyun)	Jo Kwon (417 points)
726	October 11, 2025	Lena Park	Sandeul (B1A4) & Lim Kyu-hyung (Crezl)	In Dreams (orig. song by Lena Park)	Sandeul & Lim Kyu-hyung (397 points)
726	October 11, 2025	Lena Park	Onewe	Scars Deeper Than Love (orig. song by Lena Park)	Sandeul & Lim Kyu-hyung (397 points)
726	October 11, 2025	Lena Park	Hynn	I'll Write You A Letter (orig. song by Lena Park)	Sandeul & Lim Kyu-hyung (397 points)
726	October 11, 2025	Lena Park	Forténa (only Austin Kim & Seo Yeong-tak)	P.S. I Love You (orig. song by Lena Park)	Sandeul & Lim Kyu-hyung (397 points)
726	October 11, 2025	Lena Park	Jung Joon-il & Heo Sol-ji	Missing Child (orig. song by Lena Park)	Sandeul & Lim Kyu-hyung (397 points)
726	October 11, 2025	Lena Park	Lee Mu-jin	At The Beauty Salon (orig. song by Lena Park)	Sandeul & Lim Kyu-hyung (397 points)
727	October 18, 2025	Nam Jin	Park Min-su	Love Me Once Again (orig. song by Nam Jin)	Hwang Min-ho & Lee Su-yeon (427 points)
727	October 18, 2025	Nam Jin	Jo Jung-min	Magic Lily (orig. song by Nam Jin)	Hwang Min-ho & Lee Su-yeon (427 points)
727	October 18, 2025	Nam Jin	Shin Yu	Melancholy (orig. song by Nam Jin)	Hwang Min-ho & Lee Su-yeon (427 points)
727	October 18, 2025	Nam Jin	20th Century Boy'z (Kim Jung-mo & Lee Hyuk)	It's Me (orig. song by Nam Jin)	Hwang Min-ho & Lee Su-yeon (427 points)
727	October 18, 2025	Nam Jin	Hwang Min-ho & Lee Su-yeon	Partner (orig. song by Nam Jin)	Hwang Min-ho & Lee Su-yeon (427 points)
728	October 25, 2025	Nam Jin	82Major	With My Love (orig. song by Nam Jin)	Yang Dong-geun (384 points)
728	October 25, 2025	Nam Jin	Kim Ki-tae	Empty Glass (orig. song by Nam Jin)	Yang Dong-geun (384 points)
728	October 25, 2025	Nam Jin	Na Tae-ju	Nest (orig. song by Nam Jin)	Yang Dong-geun (384 points)
728	October 25, 2025	Nam Jin	Jeon Yu-jin	Where Is My Love? (orig. song by Nam Jin)	Yang Dong-geun (384 points)
728	October 25, 2025	Nam Jin	Yang Dong-geun	Don't Change My Love (orig. song by Nam Jin)	Yang Dong-geun (384 points)
728	October 25, 2025	Nam Jin	DickPunks	If I Had A Lover (orig. song by Nam Jin)	Yang Dong-geun (384 points)
729	November 1, 2025	Youth Mic Special #2	Kim Jun-su & SoriMepci (Gugak/piano duo)	A Flower That Hasn't Bloomed (orig. song by Kim Su-cheol)	Jung Dong-ha & SOL Band (425 points)
729	November 1, 2025	Youth Mic Special #2	Onewe & Ho Ryun (singer-songwriter)	Amateur (orig. song by Lee Seung-chul)	Jung Dong-ha & SOL Band (425 points)
729	November 1, 2025	Youth Mic Special #2	Shin Youngsook & Goms Company (vocal group)	Song Of The Wind (orig. song by Cho Yong-pil)	Jung Dong-ha & SOL Band (425 points)
729	November 1, 2025	Youth Mic Special #2	Park Ae-ri, Nam Hyun-joon & SunB (Korean traditional music group)	It's Art (orig. song by Psy)	Jung Dong-ha & SOL Band (425 points)
729	November 1, 2025	Youth Mic Special #2	6BAND & Two Yein (singer-songwriter duo)	Isn't That What Life Is All About? (orig. song by Travel Skeches)	Jung Dong-ha & SOL Band (425 points)
729	November 1, 2025	Youth Mic Special #2	Jung Dong-ha & SOL Band (jazz band)	Beauty (orig. song by Shin Joong-hyun)	Jung Dong-ha & SOL Band (425 points)
730	November 8, 2025	Oh Eun-young	Mushvenom	Monkey Magic & Space Fantasy (orig. songs by Epaksa)	Seomoon Tak (430 points)
730	November 8, 2025	Oh Eun-young	Jung Seung-won	Wild Flower (orig. song by Park Hyo-shin)	Seomoon Tak (430 points)
730	November 8, 2025	Oh Eun-young	Seomoon Tak	Imagine (orig. song by John Lennon)	Seomoon Tak (430 points)
730	November 8, 2025	Oh Eun-young	Woody	Hotel California (orig. song by Eagles)	Seomoon Tak (430 points)
730	November 8, 2025	Oh Eun-young	Kim Ki-tae	Love Left Behind In The Autumn (orig. song by Patti Kim)	Seomoon Tak (430 points)
731	November 15, 2025	Oh Eun-young	Jadu	In Our Lives (orig. song by Kwon Jin-won)	Onewe (420 points)
731	November 15, 2025	Oh Eun-young	Ali	I Hope So Now (orig. song by Cho Yong-pil)	Onewe (420 points)
731	November 15, 2025	Oh Eun-young	Eun Ga-eun & Park Hyun-ho	Thanks (orig. song by Kim Dong-ryul)	Onewe (420 points)
731	November 15, 2025	Oh Eun-young	Nam Sang-il & Kim Tae-yeon	Void (orig. song by Na Hoon-a)	Onewe (420 points)
731	November 15, 2025	Oh Eun-young	Onewe	Mischievous Boy (orig. song by Sanulrim)	Onewe (420 points)
732	November 22, 2025	Kim Jong-chan & Lee Jung-seok	Ken (VIXX) & Baek Hyeong-hun (HPresso)	I Like Saturday Nights (orig. song by Kim Jong-chan)	DK (424 points)
732	November 22, 2025	Kim Jong-chan & Lee Jung-seok	Lee Ji-hoon	When Night Comes (orig. song by Lee Jun-seok)	DK (424 points)
732	November 22, 2025	Kim Jong-chan & Lee Jung-seok	Monday Kiz	To Love (orig. song by Lee Jun-seok)	DK (424 points)
732	November 22, 2025	Kim Jong-chan & Lee Jung-seok	DK	You're Crying Too (orig. song by Kim Jong-chan)	DK (424 points)
732	November 22, 2025	Kim Jong-chan & Lee Jung-seok	Park Ki-young	The First Snow Is Coming (orig. song by Lee Jun-seok)	DK (424 points)
733	November 29, 2025	Kim Jong-chan & Lee Jung-seok	Jung Jae-wook	Love Goes That Way (orig. song by Kim Jong-chan)	Kim So-hyun & Son Jun-ho (404 points)
733	November 29, 2025	Kim Jong-chan & Lee Jung-seok	Kim So-hyun & Son Jun-ho	A Conversation of Love (orig. song by Lee Jun-seok & Jo Gap-kyung)	Kim So-hyun & Son Jun-ho (404 points)
733	November 29, 2025	Kim Jong-chan & Lee Jung-seok	Zo Zazz	Life Is (orig. song by Kim Jong-chan)	Kim So-hyun & Son Jun-ho (404 points)
733	November 29, 2025	Kim Jong-chan & Lee Jung-seok	Seo J	You Are Beautiful (orig. song by Kim Jong-chan)	Kim So-hyun & Son Jun-ho (404 points)
733	November 29, 2025	Kim Jong-chan & Lee Jung-seok	Broccoli, You Too?	Memories Of A Summer Day (orig. song by Lee Jun-seok)	Kim So-hyun & Son Jun-ho (404 points)
734	December 6, 2025	Home Shopping Hosts Special	Kim Ji-hye & Kim Hye-rin	8282 (orig. song by Davichi)	Lee Chan-seok
734	December 6, 2025	Home Shopping Hosts Special	Lee Chan-seok	Ugly Guy (orig. song by Jin Sung)	Lee Chan-seok
734	December 6, 2025	Home Shopping Hosts Special	Lee Min-woong	Where Are You? (orig. song by Yang Soo-kyung)	Lee Chan-seok
734	December 6, 2025	Home Shopping Hosts Special	Dong Ji-hyun	Hey, Hey, Hey (orig. song by Jaurim)	Lee Chan-seok
734	December 6, 2025	Home Shopping Hosts Special	Ahn Sun-young	A Woman In The Rain (orig. song by Shin Joong-hyun)	Lee Chan-seok
734	December 6, 2025	Home Shopping Hosts Special	Yeom Kyung-hwan	Bravo, My Life! (orig. song by Bom Yeoreum Gaeul Kyeoul)	Lee Chan-seok
735	December 13, 2025	Family Vocal Competition Special	Park Nam-jung & Park Si-eun (STAYC) (father & daughter)	3D & Gleams Of Memories In The Rain (orig. songs by Jung Kook & Park Nam-jung)	Jannabi & Choi Jeong-jun (435 points)
735	December 13, 2025	Family Vocal Competition Special	Woody & Kim Sang-su (brothers)	Father (orig. song by Psy)	Jannabi & Choi Jeong-jun (435 points)
735	December 13, 2025	Family Vocal Competition Special	Yoon Min-soo & Kim Kyung-ja (mother & son)	You Know My Name (orig. song by Jang Min-ho)	Jannabi & Choi Jeong-jun (435 points)
735	December 13, 2025	Family Vocal Competition Special	Kan Mi-youn (Baby Vox) & Hwang Ba-ul (couple)	100m Before Meeting Her (orig. song by Lee Sang-woo)	Jannabi & Choi Jeong-jun (435 points)
735	December 13, 2025	Family Vocal Competition Special	Jannabi & Choi Jeong-jun (Choi Jung-hoon's brother & band manager)	Seoshi (orig. song by Shin Sung-woo)	Jannabi & Choi Jeong-jun (435 points)
736	December 20, 2025	"Trot Kingdom: Game of Thrones" Special; Traditional vs. New Trot (Note: Lee Chan-won was the team captain for Traditional Trot (TT) and Son Tae-jin was the captain for Team New Trot (NT). The two teams faced off in 5 rounds and a team winner was chosen in each one. The team captain with the most wins was declared the Trot King.)	Round 1 TT: Shin Seung vs. NT: Kim Jun-su; Hateful But Once Again (orig. song by Nam Jin) vs. Tess Brother! (orig. song by Na Hoon-a); TT: Kim Soo-chan vs. NT: Hwanhee; Résumé (orig. song by Nam Jin) vs. With My Love (orig. song by Nam Jin); TT: Lee Chan-won vs. NT: Son Tae-jin; This Is It (orig. song by Na Hoon-a) vs. A Piece Of Cloud (orig. song by Na Hoon-a); Round Winner: New Trot		Tied (Score: 2-2)
736	December 20, 2025	"Trot Kingdom: Game of Thrones" Special; Traditional vs. New Trot	Round 2 TT: Yoon Soo-hyun vs. NT: Heo Kyung-hwan & Giant Pink; Apartment (orig. song by Yoon Soo-il) vs. Busan Seagull (orig. song by Moon Sung-jae); TT: Lee Chan-won vs. NT: Son Tae-jin; Southbound Train (orig. song by Kim Soo-hee) vs. Daring Woman (orig. song by Seo Joo-kyung); Round Winner: Traditional Trot		Tied (Score: 2-2)
736	December 20, 2025	"Trot Kingdom: Game of Thrones" Special; Traditional vs. New Trot	Round 3 TT: Na Sang-do vs. NT: Lee Chang-min (2AM); Bumblebee (orig. song by Kang Jin) vs. Wait (orig. song by Joo Hyun-mi)		Tied (Score: 2-2)
737 (Note: With special guest appearance by Kim Yon-ja)	December 27, 2025	"Trot Kingdom: Game of Thrones" Special; Traditional vs. New Trot	Round 3 (cont.); TT: Hwang Min-ho vs. NT: Kim Da-hyun; Nasty Man (orig. song by Kim Ji-ae) vs. Face That I Miss (orig. song by Min Hae-kyung); TT: Lee Chan-won vs. NT: Son Tae-jin; My Brother (orig. song by Keum Jan-di) vs. Anyone There? (orig. song by Han Young-ae); Round Winner: Traditional Trot		Tied (Score: 2-2)
737	December 27, 2025	"Trot Kingdom: Game of Thrones" Special; Traditional vs. New Trot	Round 4 TT: Son Bin-ah vs. NT: Mose (Note: Singing under his trot stage name, Chun Gil); Who's Crying? (orig. song by Bae Ho) vs. Local Train To Mokpo (orig. song by Jang Yoon-jeong); TT: Lee Chan-won & Hwang Yoon-seong vs. NT: Son Tae-jin & Libelante (Kim Ji-hoon & Ji Won); Cherry (orig. song by Choi Heon) vs. You, My Friend (orig. song by Patti Kim); TT: Shin Shin-ae vs. NT: Epaksa; The World Is Wonderful (orig. song by Shin Shin-ae) vs. Monkey Magic (orig. song by Epaksa); Round Winner: New Trot		Tied (Score: 2-2)
737	December 27, 2025	"Trot Kingdom: Game of Thrones" Special; Traditional vs. New Trot	Round 5 TT: Kim Soo-chan & Hwang Min-ho vs. NT: Kim Jun-su & Kim Da-hyun vs. NT: Lee Jung; You Are My Man (orig. song by Han Hye-jin) vs. Roundabout Way (orig. song by Noh Sa-yeon) vs. Café Of The Winter (orig. song by Cho Yong-pil); TT: Lee Chan-won vs. NT: Son Tae-jin; Mother's Spring Day & Within 10 Minutes (orig. songs by Lee Chan-won & Kim Yon-ja) vs. Last Love & I Will Call You (orig. songs by Seol Woon-do & Son Tae-jin); Round Winner: None		Tied (Score: 2-2)

=== 2026 ===
List of episodes aired in 2026

Singers listed in order of performance.

Episode #	Broadcast Date	Legend or Theme	Guest Singers	Songs	Final Winner
738	January 3	Actors Special	Band Agami (Kim Min-seok, Lee David, Kang Seung-ho & Nam Min-woo)	Starlight (orig. song by Muse)	Amutta Band
738	January 3	Actors Special	Cha Chung-hwa	I'm My Fan (orig. song by Jaurim)	Amutta Band
738	January 3	Actors Special	No Min-woo	Lived Without Knowing The World (orig. song by Runway)	Amutta Band
738	January 3	Actors Special	Lee Byung-joon	Tearful Farewell (orig. song by Johnny Lee)	Amutta Band
738	January 3	Actors Special	Kim Seul-gi	Narrow Road (orig. song by Lucia)	Amutta Band
738	January 3	Actors Special	Amutta Band (Cha Tae-hyun, Cho Yeong-su, Hong Kyung-min, Jeon In-hyuk, Kim Jun-hyun, & Jo Jung-min)	Pierrot Smiles At Us (orig. song by Kim Wan-sun)	Amutta Band
739	January 10	Baseball Stars Special	Kim Byung-hyun	Last Concert (orig. song by Lee Seung-chul)	Lee Dae-hyung
739	January 10	Baseball Stars Special	Jeon Sa-min	Let's Stay Well (orig. song by Roy Kim)	Lee Dae-hyung
739	January 10	Baseball Stars Special	Hwang Jae-gyun	I'm A Butterfly (orig. song by YB)	Lee Dae-hyung
739	January 10	Baseball Stars Special	Park Yong-taik	Le Temps Des Cathédrales (Musical number of Notre-Dame de Paris)	Lee Dae-hyung
739	January 10	Baseball Stars Special	Lee Dae-hyung	Addicted Love (orig. song by Jo Jang-hyuk)	Lee Dae-hyung
740	January 17	Baseball Stars Special	Yoo Hee-kwan	Mom (orig. song by Ra.D)	Lim Jun-hyung
740	January 17	Baseball Stars Special	Jeong Keun-woo	Spring In My Life... (orig. song by Can)	Lim Jun-hyung
740	January 17	Baseball Stars Special	Choi Joo-hwan	La La La (orig. song by SG Wannabe)	Lim Jun-hyung
740	January 17	Baseball Stars Special	Kim Tae-yeon	What Love Is (orig. song by Boohwal)	Lim Jun-hyung
740	January 17	Baseball Stars Special	Lim Jun-hyung	Magic Castle (orig. song by The Classic)	Lim Jun-hyung
741	January 24	Yoo Yeol	Enoch	A Hymn Of Love (orig. song by Yoo Yeol & Seo Young-eun)	Libelante (389 points)
741	January 24	Yoo Yeol	Woody	Autumn Rain (orig. song by Yoo Yeol)	Libelante (389 points)
741	January 24	Yoo Yeol	No Min-woo	The Glorious Days Are Gone (orig. song by Yoo Yeol)	Libelante (389 points)
741	January 24	Yoo Yeol	La Poem (except Park Ki-hun)	Eruhwa (orig. song by Yoo Yeol)	Libelante (389 points)
741	January 24	Yoo Yeol	Libelante (except Noh Hyun-Woo)	Some Day (orig. song by Yoo Yeol)	Libelante (389 points)
742	January 31	Oh My Star #7 Special	Aiki & Ri.hey	Pierrot Smiles At Us (orig. song by Kim Wan-sun)	Lyn & Zo Zazz (420 points)
742	January 31	Oh My Star #7 Special	Park Jin-joo & Min Kyung-ah	Drowning (orig. song by Woodz)	Lyn & Zo Zazz (420 points)
742	January 31	Oh My Star #7 Special	Lim Han-byul & Hynn	Last Love (orig. song by Kim Bum-soo)	Lyn & Zo Zazz (420 points)
742	January 31	Oh My Star #7 Special	Jung Seung-hwan & Jongho (Ateez)	My Sea (orig. song by IU)	Lyn & Zo Zazz (420 points)
742	January 31	Oh My Star #7 Special	Lyn & Zo Zazz	The Wind Blows (orig. song by Lee So-ra)	Lyn & Zo Zazz (420 points)
743	February 7	Oh My Star #7 Special	Jang Dong-woo (Infinite) & Cravity (Taeyoung & Serim)	Good Boy (orig. song by G-Dragon & Taeyang)	Kim Kwang-jin & Woodz (420 points)
743	February 7	Oh My Star #7 Special	Seomoon Tak & KARDI	Someone's Dream (orig. song by SSAW)	Kim Kwang-jin & Woodz (420 points)
743	February 7	Oh My Star #7 Special	Moon Se-yoon & Hanhae	Only The Words I Love You (orig. song by Rich)	Kim Kwang-jin & Woodz (420 points)
743	February 7	Oh My Star #7 Special	Kim Young-im & Shin Seung-tae	One Fine Spring Day (orig. song by Baek Seol-hee)	Kim Kwang-jin & Woodz (420 points)
743	February 7	Oh My Star #7 Special	Kim Kwang-jin & Woodz	If You Feel The Same (orig. song by Park Sang-tae)	Kim Kwang-jin & Woodz (420 points)
744	February 14	Foreign Stars Special	Leo Ranta (Finland)	Everyone (orig. song by Yoon Bok-hee)	Daniel Lindemann & Takuya Terada
744	February 14	Foreign Stars Special	Sam Hammington (Australia)	Story Of Last Night (orig. song by Sobangcha)	Daniel Lindemann & Takuya Terada
744	February 14	Foreign Stars Special	Guzal Tursunova (Uzbekistan)	On A Saturday Night (orig. song by Son Dam-bi)	Daniel Lindemann & Takuya Terada
744	February 14	Foreign Stars Special	Daniel Lindemann (Germany) & Takuya Terada (Japan)	Father (orig. song by Lim Young-woong)	Daniel Lindemann & Takuya Terada
744	February 14	Foreign Stars Special	Sayuri Fujita (Japan)	Mom's Arirang (orig. song by Song Ga-in)	Daniel Lindemann & Takuya Terada
744	February 14	Foreign Stars Special	Angelina Danilova (Russia)	Event Horizon (orig. song by Younha)	Daniel Lindemann & Takuya Terada
745	February 21	Seol Woon-do	Lee Jung	Is This What Love Is Like? (orig. song by Seol Woon-do)	Son Tae-jin (424 points)
745	February 21	Seol Woon-do	Lee Seung-hyun	I Only Loved You (orig. song by Seol Woon-do)	Son Tae-jin (424 points)
745	February 21	Seol Woon-do	Jeon Yu-jin	Lady of Samba (orig. song by Seol Woon-do)	Son Tae-jin (424 points)
745	February 21	Seol Woon-do	Son Tae-jin	Love Twist (orig. song by Seol Woon-do)	Son Tae-jin (424 points)
745	February 21	Seol Woon-do	Lun8 (except Park Do-hyun & Ji Eun-ho)	Let's Do Cha-Cha-Cha (orig. song by Seol Woon-do)	Son Tae-jin (424 points)
746	February 28	Seol Woon-do	Jadu	Tonight (orig. song by Enoch)	Park Seo-jin (417 points)
746	February 28	Seol Woon-do	Kim Soo-chan	Compass (orig. song by Seol Woon-do)	Park Seo-jin (417 points)
746	February 28	Seol Woon-do	Kim So-hyang & Yoon Hyung-ryul	My Starry Night (orig. song by Lim Young-woong)	Park Seo-jin (417 points)
746	February 28	Seol Woon-do	D82	Purple Postcard (orig. song by Seol Woon-do)	Park Seo-jin (417 points)
746	February 28	Seol Woon-do	Park Seo-jin	Lost 30 Years (orig. song by Seol Woon-do)	Park Seo-jin (417 points)
No broadcast on March 7 due to live coverage of the 2026 World Baseball Classic.
747	March 14	30th Anniversary of the death of Kim Kwang-seok	Seo Eun-kwang (BtoB)	With The Heart That Must Forget (orig. song by Kim Kwang-seok)	Kim Dong-jun (393 points)
747	March 14	30th Anniversary of the death of Kim Kwang-seok	Yoon San-ha (Astro)	Story Of A Couple In Their 60's (orig. song by Kim Kwang-seok)	Kim Dong-jun (393 points)
747	March 14	30th Anniversary of the death of Kim Kwang-seok	Seo J	Even Though I Loved You (orig. song by Kim Kwang-seok)	Kim Dong-jun (393 points)
747	March 14	30th Anniversary of the death of Kim Kwang-seok	Jeon Yu-jin	Becoming Dust (orig. song by Kim Kwang-seok)	Kim Dong-jun (393 points)
747	March 14	30th Anniversary of the death of Kim Kwang-seok	Kim Dong-jun	A Letter From A Private (orig. song by Kim Kwang-seok)	Kim Dong-jun (393 points)
748	March 21	30th Anniversary of the death of Kim Kwang-seok	Forestella	To You (orig. song by Kim Kwang-seok)	Touched (425 points)
748	March 21	30th Anniversary of the death of Kim Kwang-seok	Ha Sung-woon	It's Not Love If It Hurts Too Much (orig. song by Kim Kwang-seok)	Touched (425 points)
748	March 21	30th Anniversary of the death of Kim Kwang-seok	Zo Zazz	On The Street (orig. song by Kim Kwang-seok)	Touched (425 points)
748	March 21	30th Anniversary of the death of Kim Kwang-seok	Choi Sang-yeop (Lucy)	The Days (orig. song by Kim Kwang-seok)	Touched (425 points)
748	March 21	30th Anniversary of the death of Kim Kwang-seok	Touched	Around Thirty (orig. song by Kim Kwang-seok)	Touched (425 points)
749	March 28	Best Celebrity Singer Special	Hong Seok-cheon	I Will Show You (orig. song by Ailee)	Kim Shin-young & Cheon Dan-bi
749	March 28	Best Celebrity Singer Special	Park Joon-hyung (Note: With special guest performance by Park Seong-ho)	No! No! (orig. song by Kim Sang-bae)	Kim Shin-young & Cheon Dan-bi
749	March 28	Best Celebrity Singer Special	Moon Se-yoon	Replay (orig. song by Kim Dong-ryul)	Kim Shin-young & Cheon Dan-bi
749	March 28	Best Celebrity Singer Special	Lee Hwi-jae	When Time Passes (orig. song by Choi Ho-seob)	Kim Shin-young & Cheon Dan-bi
749	March 28	Best Celebrity Singer Special	Kim Shin-young & Cheon Dan-bi	From Now (orig. song by Seoul Family)	Kim Shin-young & Cheon Dan-bi
750	April 4	Best Celebrity Singer Special	Park Sung-kwang, Jung Beom-kyun, Lee Sang-hoon & Seo Seong-kyoung	Our Dream (orig. song by Koyote)	Song Il-kook & Oh Man-seok
750	April 4	Best Celebrity Singer Special	Jo Hye-ryun	My Only Love Gone Away (orig. song by Lim Hee-sook)	Song Il-kook & Oh Man-seok
750	April 4	Best Celebrity Singer Special	Song Il-kook & Oh Man-seok (Note: With special guest performances by the cast of the musical "The Hague")	The Dreams (orig. song by Cho Yong-pil)	Song Il-kook & Oh Man-seok
750	April 4	Best Celebrity Singer Special	Lee Chan-seok	By Chance (orig. song by Woo Yeon-yi)	Song Il-kook & Oh Man-seok
750	April 4	Best Celebrity Singer Special	RalRal	Arari (orig. song by Shim Gyu-seon)	Song Il-kook & Oh Man-seok
751	April 11	Yoon Il-sang	Kiss of Life	Amor Fati (orig. song by Kim Yon-ja)	Min Woo-hyuk (400 points)
751	April 11	Yoon Il-sang	Hwang Chi-yeul	I Have A Lover (orig. song by Lee Eun-mi)	Min Woo-hyuk (400 points)
751	April 11	Yoon Il-sang	La Poem (except Park Ki-hun)	I Miss You (orig. song by Kim Bum-soo)	Min Woo-hyuk (400 points)
751	April 11	Yoon Il-sang	Dayoung (WJSN)	Flew Over The Cuckoo's Nest (orig. song by Kim Gun-mo)	Min Woo-hyuk (400 points)
751	April 11	Yoon Il-sang	Min Woo-hyuk	As We Live (Musical number from "Seopyeonje")	Min Woo-hyuk (400 points)
752	April 18	Yoon Il-sang	Mighty Mouth & Minyoung (BB Girls) (Note: With special guest appearance by Kim Jong-kook via video and during rehearsals.)	Love Is... (3+3=0) (orig. song by Turbo)	TWS (427 points)
752	April 18	Yoon Il-sang	TWS	Affection (orig. song by Young Turks Club)	TWS (427 points)
752	April 18	Yoon Il-sang	Daybreak	Unpredictable Life (orig. song by Lee Moon-sae)	TWS (427 points)
752	April 18	Yoon Il-sang	Lim Han-byul	Fate (orig. song by Lee Seung-chul)	TWS (427 points)
752	April 18	Yoon Il-sang	Takenaka Yudai (Novelbright)	I'll Forget (orig. song by YB)	TWS (427 points)
753	April 25	Announcers & Family Special	Kim Hyung-wook & Kim Sun-keun	Heungbo Is Amazing (orig. song by Yukgaksu)	Wang Jong-geun & Family
753	April 25	Announcers & Family Special	Kim Dae-ho & Family	Sad Love (orig. song by Kim Soo-hee)	Wang Jong-geun & Family
753	April 25	Announcers & Family Special	Park Chan-min & Family	Airplane (orig. song by Turtles)	Wang Jong-geun & Family
753	April 25	Announcers & Family Special	Park Tae-won & Family	Zärtliche Liebe & Partner (orig. songs by Ludwig van Beethoven & Nam Jin)	Wang Jong-geun & Family
753	April 25	Announcers & Family Special	Wang Jong-geun & Family	My Way (English version by Frank Sinatra)	Wang Jong-geun & Family
753	April 25	Announcers & Family Special	Park So-hyun & GGoGGO	Nagging (orig. song by IU & Lim Seul-ong)	Wang Jong-geun & Family
754	May 2	Joo Young-hoon	Ko Young-bae (Soran)	Loveable (orig. song by Kim Jong-kook)	Sandeul (408 points)
754	May 2	Joo Young-hoon	Choi Jin-hyuk	Eternity (orig. song by Choi Jin-young)	Sandeul (408 points)
754	May 2	Joo Young-hoon	Billlie	Sad Dream (orig. song by Koyote)	Sandeul (408 points)
754	May 2	Joo Young-hoon	Kim Ki-tae	Rhapsody of Sadness (orig. song by Choi Jae-hoon)	Sandeul (408 points)
754	May 2	Joo Young-hoon	Sandeul (B1A4)	Don't Give Up (orig. song by Sung Jin-woo)	Sandeul (408 points)
755	May 9	Joo Young-hoon	Son Seung-yeon & Cho Hyung-kyun	Our Love Like This (orig. song by Joo Young-hoon & Lee Hye-jin)	Nexz (389 points)
755	May 9	Joo Young-hoon	Chae Yeon	Storm (orig. song by Rumors)	Nexz (389 points)
755	May 9	Joo Young-hoon	D82	Dialog of Dream (orig. song by Jang Hye-jin)	Nexz (389 points)
755	May 9	Joo Young-hoon	Aiki, Ri.hey & Hyo-jin Choi	Rose of Betrayal & Poison (orig. songs by Uhm Jung-hwa)	Nexz (389 points)
755	May 9	Joo Young-hoon	Nexz	My Childhood Dream (orig. song by Turbo)	Nexz (389 points)
756	May 16	Han Young-ae	Jung Dong-ha	At The Rapids (orig. song by Han Young-ae)	Choi Jung-in (417 points)
756	May 16	Han Young-ae	Sohyang	Tuning (orig. song by Han Young-ae)	Choi Jung-in (417 points)
756	May 16	Han Young-ae	Ko Hoon-jung & Lee Chang-yong	Is Anyone There? (orig. song by Han Young-ae)	Choi Jung-in (417 points)
756	May 16	Han Young-ae	Choi Jung-in	Wind (orig. song by Han Young-ae)	Choi Jung-in (417 points)
756	May 16	Han Young-ae	sEODo Band	You Inside A Deep Part Of My Heart (orig. song by Sunflower)	Choi Jung-in (417 points)
756	May 16	Han Young-ae	Do Won-kyung	Rhinoceros (orig. song by Han Young-ae)	Choi Jung-in (417 points)
757	May 23	2026 Seoul Spring Festival	STAYC	I Want It & Like Like (Weather Forecast) (orig. songs by STAYC & Yoon)	No Winner
757	May 23	2026 Seoul Spring Festival	Tei	Same Pillow & Last Love (orig. songs by Tei & Kim Bum-soo)	No Winner
757	May 23	2026 Seoul Spring Festival	Chae Yeon	Feeling Love, Dangerous Performance, That Person In Sinsa-dong & Two Of Us (orig. songs by Chae Yeon & Joo Hyun-mi)	No Winner
757	May 23	2026 Seoul Spring Festival	Amutta Band	You Know My Love, Two-Lane Bridge & At The Subway Station In Front Of City Hall (orig. songs by Amutta Band, Cha Tae-hyun & Zoo)	No Winner
757	May 23	2026 Seoul Spring Festival	NCT Wish	Intro + Ode To Love, Surf & Sticky (orig. songs by NCT Wish)	No Winner
757	May 23	2026 Seoul Spring Festival	Lee Chan-won	I'm Going To Meet You & Seoul Daejeon Daegu Busan (orig. songs by Lee Chan-won & Kim Hye-yeon)	No Winner
757	May 23	2026 Seoul Spring Festival	Jinusean	A-Yo!, Phone Number & Tell Me (orig. songs by Jinusean)	No Winner
757	May 23	2026 Seoul Spring Festival	HoooW	Friday Night, Goodbye & One Candle (orig. songs by g.o.d & HoooW)	No Winner
758	May 30	Kim Do-hoon (composer)	Park Hyun-kyu	Will You Marry Me? (orig. song by Lee Seung-gi)	Lee Seung-gi (409 points)
758	May 30	Kim Do-hoon (composer)	Gummy	Just A Feeling (orig. song by S.E.S.)	Lee Seung-gi (409 points)
758	May 30	Kim Do-hoon (composer)	SeeYa	I Will Show You (orig. song by Ailee)	Lee Seung-gi (409 points)
758	May 30	Kim Do-hoon (composer)	Xikers	Twit (orig. song by Hwasa)	Lee Seung-gi (409 points)
758	May 30	Kim Do-hoon (composer)	Lee Seung-gi	We Should've Been Friends (orig. song by Gummy)	Lee Seung-gi (409 points)
759	June 6	Kim Do-hoon (composer)	Bada	Décalcomanie (orig. song by Mamamoo)	K.Will (412 points)
759	June 6	Kim Do-hoon (composer)	Huh Gak, Monday Kiz & Lim Han-byul	Dropping The Tears (orig. song by K.Will)	K.Will (412 points)
759	June 6	Kim Do-hoon (composer)	Lee Seok-hoon	Don't Forget (orig. song by Baek Ji-young)	K.Will (412 points)
759	June 6	Kim Do-hoon (composer)	Onewe	8282 (orig. song by Davichi)	K.Will (412 points)
759	June 6	Kim Do-hoon (composer)	K.Will	I'm Missing You (orig. song by Wheesung)	K.Will (412 points)
760	June 13	"Dreams Come True" Special (Note: Special created to support the Korean national team at the 2026 FIFA World Cup)	Ali	This Is Me (OST by Keala Settle for "The Greatest Showman")	Yun Seong (421 points)
760	June 13	"Dreams Come True" Special	Mighty Mouth	World Cup Song (orig. song by Clon)	Yun Seong (421 points)
760	June 13	"Dreams Come True" Special	Kim Jang-hoon & Kang Kyun-sung	Red Sunset (orig. song by Lee Moon-sae)	Yun Seong (421 points)
760	June 13	"Dreams Come True" Special	Yun Seong	Hand In Hand (orig. song by Koreana)	Yun Seong (421 points)
760	June 13	"Dreams Come True" Special	Libelante	We Are the Champions (orig. song by Queen)	Yun Seong (421 points)
761	June 20	Trot Best Friends Special	Kim Na-hee & Miss Kim	My Only Love Gone Away (orig. song by Lim Hee-sook)	Shin Seung-tae & Kim Jun-su (417 points)
761	June 20	Trot Best Friends Special	Han Hye-jin & Park Hyun-ho	That's You (orig. song by Lee Jang-hee)	Shin Seung-tae & Kim Jun-su (417 points)
761	June 20	Trot Best Friends Special	Lee So-na & Hong Sung-youn	Aegata (orig. song by Jang Yoon-jeong)	Shin Seung-tae & Kim Jun-su (417 points)
761	June 20	Trot Best Friends Special	Hwanhee & Choi Soo-ho	Please (orig. song by Lee So-ra)	Shin Seung-tae & Kim Jun-su (417 points)
761	June 20	Trot Best Friends Special	Shin Seung-tae & Kim Jun-su	Tobacco Shop Girl (orig. song by Song Chang-sik)	Shin Seung-tae & Kim Jun-su (417 points)
762	June 27	Trot Best Friends Special	Lee Jung & Chun Gil	I Won't Change My Mind (orig. song by Cho Yong-pil)	Kim Beom-ryong & Jin Si-mon (407 points)
762	June 27	Trot Best Friends Special	Park Ku-yoon, Kim Soo-chan & Jeong Keun-woo	A Man's Pure Love (orig. song by Seo Jin-pil)	Kim Beom-ryong & Jin Si-mon (407 points)
762	June 27	Trot Best Friends Special	Kim Yong-bin, Son Bin-ah & Chu Hyuk-jin	Woman From Casbah (orig. song by Yoon Hee-sang)	Kim Beom-ryong & Jin Si-mon (407 points)
762	June 27	Trot Best Friends Special	Jo Hye-ryun & Shin Seong	Lying In The Sea (orig. song by Treble Clef)	Kim Beom-ryong & Jin Si-mon (407 points)
762	June 27	Trot Best Friends Special	Kim Beom-ryong & Jin Si-mon (Note: with special guest performance by Jeong Soo-ra)	Not Too Late (orig. song by Green Area)	Kim Beom-ryong & Jin Si-mon (407 points)
763 (Note: with special guest appearances in the waiting room by Seo Hyun-chul and Ko Chang-seok)	July 4	"The Day We Sing" Special	Lee Ji-soo	Magic Lily (orig. song by Ahn Ye-eun)	Sandeul
763	July 4	"The Day We Sing" Special	Park Kyu-won	Left-Hander (orig. song by Panic)	Sandeul
763	July 4	"The Day We Sing" Special	Choi Jin-hyuk	After Love (orig. song by M.N.J)	Sandeul
763	July 4	"The Day We Sing" Special	Kim Jung-hyun	Confession (orig. song by Jung Joon-Il)	Sandeul
763	July 4	"The Day We Sing" Special	Sandeul (B1A4)	The Wind Is Blowing (orig. song by Lee So-ra)	Sandeul
764	July 11	Boohwal 40th Anniversary: Kim Tae-won	Lee Ye-ji	Lonely Night (orig. song by Boohwal)	Lee Seung-hyub & Yoo Hwe-seung (421 points)
764	July 11	Boohwal 40th Anniversary: Kim Tae-won	Zo Zazz	Never Ending Story (orig. song by Boohwal)	Lee Seung-hyub & Yoo Hwe-seung (421 points)
764	July 11	Boohwal 40th Anniversary: Kim Tae-won	6BAND	If I Love You Again (orig. song by Do Won-kyung)	Lee Seung-hyub & Yoo Hwe-seung (421 points)
764	July 11	Boohwal 40th Anniversary: Kim Tae-won	Kim Shin-eui (Monni)	Rain And Your Story (orig. song by Boohwal)	Lee Seung-hyub & Yoo Hwe-seung (421 points)
764	July 11	Boohwal 40th Anniversary: Kim Tae-won	Kang Seung-yoon (Winner)	The Last Concert (orig. song by Boohwal)	Lee Seung-hyub & Yoo Hwe-seung (421 points)
764	July 11	Boohwal 40th Anniversary: Kim Tae-won	Lee Seung-hyub & Yoo Hwe-seung (N.Flying)	The More I Love You (orig. song by Boohwal)	Lee Seung-hyub & Yoo Hwe-seung (421 points)
765	July 18	2026 King of Kings Special	Forestella	Changgwi (orig. song by Ahn Ye-eun)	Forestella (403 points)
765	July 18	2026 King of Kings Special	Hwang Min-ho & Lee Su-yeon	Now (orig. song by Seoul Family)	Forestella (403 points)
765	July 18	2026 King of Kings Special	Libelante	Partner For Life (orig. song by SG Wannabe)	Forestella (403 points)
765	July 18	2026 King of Kings Special	Park Seo-jin	Story Of Last Night (orig. song by Sobangcha)	Forestella (403 points)
765	July 18	2026 King of Kings Special	B1A4	Hate You (orig. song by Sim Soo-bong)	Forestella (403 points)
766	July 25	2026 King of Kings Special	Lyn & Zo Zazz	Addicted To Love (orig. song by Jo Jang Hyuk)	K.Will (422 points)
766	July 25	2026 King of Kings Special	Min Woo-hyuk, Cho Hyung-kyun & Yuria	Dreaming of Bal-Hae (orig. song by Seo Taiji and Boys)	K.Will (422 points)
766	July 25	2026 King of Kings Special	K.Will	Moon Of Seoul (orig. song by Kim Gun-mo)	K.Will (422 points)
766	July 25	2026 King of Kings Special	Nexz	It's Raining (orig. song by Rain)	K.Will (422 points)
766	July 25	2026 King of Kings Special	Kim Dong-jun & Young Tak	Time Of Our Life (orig. song by Day6)	K.Will (422 points)
767	August 1	K-Pop Time Machine Special	Yurisangja	Forever With You (orig. song by Lee Moon-sae)	Park Mi-kyung & Shin Hyo-beom (382 points)
767	August 1	K-Pop Time Machine Special	So Chan-whee	On The Road Where The Sun Sets Down & I Will Fly Away Like A Bird (orig. songs by Sinawe)	Park Mi-kyung & Shin Hyo-beom (382 points)
767	August 1	K-Pop Time Machine Special	Hong Kyung-min	Drowning (orig. song by Woodz)	Park Mi-kyung & Shin Hyo-beom (382 points)
767	August 1	K-Pop Time Machine Special	R.ef (Lee Sung-wook & Song Dae-hyun)	You In My Imagination (orig. song by Noise)	Park Mi-kyung & Shin Hyo-beom (382 points)
767	August 1	K-Pop Time Machine Special	Park Mi-kyung & Shin Hyo-beom	I Will Show You (orig. song by Ailee)	Park Mi-kyung & Shin Hyo-beom (382 points)
768	August 8	K-Pop Time Machine Special	Park Nam-jung	Sad Mannequin (orig. song by Hyun Jin-young)	Moon Se-yoon & Turtles (398 points)
768	August 8	K-Pop Time Machine Special	Hyun Jin-young	Gleams Of Memories In The Rain (orig. song by Park Nam-jung)	Moon Se-yoon & Turtles (398 points)
768	August 8	K-Pop Time Machine Special	Noise (Hong Jong-gu & Han Sang-il)	Farewell Formula (orig. song by R.ef)	Moon Se-yoon & Turtles (398 points)
768	August 8	K-Pop Time Machine Special	Moon Se-yoon & Turtles (Z.E & Geum B)	Woman On The Beach (orig. song by Cool)	Moon Se-yoon & Turtles (398 points)
768	August 8	K-Pop Time Machine Special	Chae Yeon	Coincidence (remake by Baby Vox of orig. song by KOLA)	Moon Se-yoon & Turtles (398 points)
769	August 15	81st Anniversary of the National Liberation Day of Korea	Hanhae & La Poem (except Park Ki-hoon)	Thorn Tree (orig. song by Towner & Town Head)	Seomoon Tak (418 points)
769	August 15	81st Anniversary of the National Liberation Day of Korea	Ji-sun	This Turbulent Life (anonymous song)	Seomoon Tak (418 points)
769	August 15	81st Anniversary of the National Liberation Day of Korea	Hong Ji-min & Yang Joon-mo	Father (orig. song by Insooni)	Seomoon Tak (418 points)
769	August 15	81st Anniversary of the National Liberation Day of Korea	Kim Jun-su & Ahn Ye-eun	Get Up (orig. song by Kim Kwang-seok)	Seomoon Tak (418 points)
769	August 15	81st Anniversary of the National Liberation Day of Korea	Lim Kyu-hyung	Shout Myself (orig. song by Maya)	Seomoon Tak (418 points)
769	August 15	81st Anniversary of the National Liberation Day of Korea	Seomoon Tak	A Flower Yet To Bloom (orig. song by Kim Soo-chul)	Seomoon Tak (418 points)
770	August 22	Choi Baek-ho 50th Anniversary Special	Wax	Wondering Heart (orig. song by Choi Baek-ho)	Son Tae-jin (420 points)
770	August 22	Choi Baek-ho 50th Anniversary Special	Crying Nut	Friend From Yeongil Bay (orig. song by Choi Baek-ho)	Son Tae-jin (420 points)
770	August 22	Choi Baek-ho 50th Anniversary Special	Ailee Band	Run (orig. song by Choi Baek-ho)	Son Tae-jin (420 points)
770	August 22	Choi Baek-ho 50th Anniversary Special	Lee Ji-hoon	About Romance (orig. song by Choi Baek-ho)	Son Tae-jin (420 points)
770	August 22	Choi Baek-ho 50th Anniversary Special	Son Tae-jin	End Of The Sea (orig. song by Choi Baek-ho)	Son Tae-jin (420 points)
771	August 29	National Trot Festival Special	Jin Sung & Kim Tae-yeon	A Slow Train Bound To Mokpo (orig. song by Jang Yoon-jeong)	Shin Seung-tae (416 points)
771	August 29	National Trot Festival Special	Shin Seung-tae	Hundreds Of Years (orig. Gangwon Folk song)	Shin Seung-tae (416 points)
771	August 29	National Trot Festival Special	Park Hyun-bin & Yoo Ji-woo	Alleyway (orig. song by Shinchon Blues)	Shin Seung-tae (416 points)
771	August 29	National Trot Festival Special	Kim Yong-bin	What I All Care Is Love (orig. song by Sim Soo-bong)	Shin Seung-tae (416 points)
771	August 29	National Trot Festival Special	Shin Jang-mi & Yoon Soo-hyun	Seoul Tango (orig. song by Bang Sil-ei)	Shin Seung-tae (416 points)
772	September 5	National Trot Festival Special	Han Hye-jin & Eun Ga-eun	Come Back To Busan Harbor (orig. song by Cho Yong-pil)	Seong-ri & Jang Han-byul (409 points)
772	September 5	National Trot Festival Special	Kang Hye-yeon & Yang Ji-eun	You And I & A Cloud Reclining On Time (orig. Jeju folk song and orig. song by Na Hoon-a)	Seong-ri & Jang Han-byul (409 points)
772	September 5	National Trot Festival Special	Shin Seong & Nam Kung-jin	Farewell (orig. song by Patti Kim)	Seong-ri & Jang Han-byul (409 points)
772	September 5	National Trot Festival Special	Seong-ri & Jang Han-byul	A Chance Encounter (orig. song by Songgolmae)	Seong-ri & Jang Han-byul (409 points)
772	September 5	National Trot Festival Special	Shin Yu	First Rain (orig. song by Patti Kim)	Seong-ri & Jang Han-byul (409 points)
773	September 12	New Wave Festival in Ulsan	Lee Seung-gi	Gale Force Wind, By Your Side & Because You're My Woman (orig. songs by Yoo Jeong-seok & Lee Seung-gi)	No Winner
773	September 12	New Wave Festival in Ulsan	Dayoung	Flirty (orig. song by Dayoung & Jay Park)	No Winner
773	September 12	New Wave Festival in Ulsan	Click-B	Undefeatable, Forgotten Love & Violet Fragrance (orig. songs by Click-B & Kang Susie)	No Winner
773	September 12	New Wave Festival in Ulsan	Lee Chan-won	My Long Journey & Ulsan Arirang (orig. songs by Lee Chan-won & Oh Eun-jeong)	No Winner
773	September 12	New Wave Festival in Ulsan	Forestella	Bohemian Rhapsody, Piano Man & Despacito (orig. songs by Queen, Billy Joel & Luis Fonsi)	No Winner
773	September 12	New Wave Festival in Ulsan	Seo In-young & Dayoung	Cinderella (orig. song by Seo In-young)	No Winner
773	September 12	New Wave Festival in Ulsan	Jewelry (Seo In-young, Lee Ji-hyun, Park Jung-ah & Cho Min-ah)	One More Time, I Really Like You, Tonight & Super Star (orig. songs by Jewelry)	No Winner
774	September 19	New Wave Festival in Ulsan	Honey J	+82 (orig. song by Sumin)	No Winner
774	September 19	New Wave Festival in Ulsan	Band Agami (Kim Min-seok, Lee David, Kang Seung-ho, Nam Min-woo) & Jeong Chan-ho)	Lovebug, Liberation Rock & T.B.H (orig. songs by Agami & QWER)	No Winner
774	September 19	New Wave Festival in Ulsan	Ailee	U&I, Singing Got Better & I Will Show You (orig. songs by Ailee)	No Winner
774	September 19	New Wave Festival in Ulsan	Cravity	Lemonade Fever & Set Net G0?! (orig. songs by Cravity)	No Winner
774	September 19	New Wave Festival in Ulsan	Mad Clown & siso	Except You & Rain Drops (orig. songs by Mad Clown)	No Winner
774	September 19	New Wave Festival in Ulsan	Son Tae-jin	A Million Roses, Where We Sing In & For You, I Sing (orig. songs by Sim Soo-bong & Son Tae-jin)	No Winner
774	September 19	New Wave Festival in Ulsan	Forestella	Kool, Armageddon & Champions (orig. songs by Forestella)	No Winner
774	September 19	New Wave Festival in Ulsan	Lee Seung-gi & Mad Clown	Father (orig. song by Lee Seung-gi)	No Winner
774	September 19	New Wave Festival in Ulsan	Lee Seung-gi	Smile Boy (orig. song by Lee Seung-gi)	No Winner
774	September 19	New Wave Festival in Ulsan	All Performers	Let's Go On A Vacation! (orig. song by Cho Yong-pil)	No Winner
No broadcast on September 26 and October 3 due to live coverage of the 2026 Asian Games.
775	October 10	Park Geun-tae (composer)	Hynn	Evening Sky (orig. song by Ailee)	Woody & Yoon Bo-ra (404 points)
775	October 10	Park Geun-tae (composer)	KCM & DK	Timeless (orig. song by SG Wannabe)	Woody & Yoon Bo-ra (404 points)
775	October 10	Park Geun-tae (composer)	Daybreak	Super Star (orig. song by Jewelry)	Woody & Yoon Bo-ra (404 points)
775	October 10	Park Geun-tae (composer)	Woody & Yoon Bo-ra (Note: With special guest performance by Insooni)	My Friend (orig. song by Insooni ft. Cho PD)	Woody & Yoon Bo-ra (404 points)
775	October 10	Park Geun-tae (composer)	Ock Joo-hyun	Meet Him Among Them (orig. song by Lee Sun-hee)	Woody & Yoon Bo-ra (404 points)
776	October 17	Park Geun-tae (composer)	Park Jung-ah	Happy Me (orig. song by Eco)	Huh Gak & Kim Ye-chan (417 points)
776	October 17	Park Geun-tae (composer)	Kim Hee-jae	Sunflower (orig. song by Park Sang-min)	Huh Gak & Kim Ye-chan (417 points)
776	October 17	Park Geun-tae (composer)	Seong-ri	Brand New (orig. song by Shinhwa)	Huh Gak & Kim Ye-chan (417 points)
776	October 17	Park Geun-tae (composer)	Evan	Caution (orig. song by Tashannie)	Huh Gak & Kim Ye-chan (417 points)
776	October 17	Park Geun-tae (composer)	Huh Gak & Kim Ye-chan	I Won't Love Again (orig. song by Baek Ji-young)	Huh Gak & Kim Ye-chan (417 points)
777	October 24	K-Royal Culture Festival: Palaces Awaken the Arts	Honey J	From Asadal & Walpae Drill (orig. songs by Park Ji-hun)	No Winner
777	October 24	K-Royal Culture Festival: Palaces Awaken the Arts	Xikers	Okay (orig. song by xikers)	No Winner
777	October 24	K-Royal Culture Festival: Palaces Awaken the Arts	BtoB (Seo Eun-kwang & Lee Min-hyuk)	Icy & Spicy, Feel Alive & Missing You (orig. songs by Lee Min-hyuk, Seo Eun-kwang & BtoB)	No Winner
777	October 24	K-Royal Culture Festival: Palaces Awaken the Arts	Park Ji-hyeon	It Melts & Mu (orig. songs by Park Ji-hyeon)	No Winner
777	October 24	K-Royal Culture Festival: Palaces Awaken the Arts	HuhYongByul (Huh Gak, Shin Yong-jae & Lim Han-byul)	Fate, The Moment of Stars & How Could You Leave (orig. songs by Lee Sun-hee & HuhYongByul)	No Winner
777	October 24	K-Royal Culture Festival: Palaces Awaken the Arts	Song Ga-in	Ga-in, Asadal, Mom's Arirang (orig. songs by Song Ga-in)	No Winner
777	October 24	K-Royal Culture Festival: Palaces Awaken the Arts	La Poem	Hamangyeon & Alive (orig. songs by Alessandro Safina & La Poem)	No Winner
777	October 24	K-Royal Culture Festival: Palaces Awaken the Arts	Kim Young-im	Boat Song & Hundreds Of Years (orig. Gyeonggi folk song & orig. song by Kim Young-im)	No Winner
777	October 24	K-Royal Culture Festival: Palaces Awaken the Arts	Kim Young-im & La Poem	Arirang & Hand in Hand (orig. folk song & orig. song by Koreana)	No Winner
778	October 31	K-Royal Culture Festival: Palaces Awaken the Arts	BoyNextDoor	Ddok Ddok Ddok, Animal & Adios! (orig. songs by BoyNextDoor)	No Winner
778	October 31	K-Royal Culture Festival: Palaces Awaken the Arts	Nmixx	Blue Valentine & Heavy Serenade (orig. songs by Nmixx)	No Winner
778	October 31	K-Royal Culture Festival: Palaces Awaken the Arts	Ateez (except Wooyoung)	Drip & Bad (orig. songs by Ateez)	No Winner
778	October 31	K-Royal Culture Festival: Palaces Awaken the Arts	Park Ji-hyeon	Life, Foolish Fellow & Srirang (orig. songs by Na Hoon-a, Jin Sung & Yoo Ji-na)	No Winner
778	October 31	K-Royal Culture Festival: Palaces Awaken the Arts	Lyn	Back In Time & Camellia Lady (orig. songs by Lyn & Lee Mi-ja)	No Winner
778	October 31	K-Royal Culture Festival: Palaces Awaken the Arts	Lyn & Lee Seung-gi	Return (orig. song by Lee Seung-gi)	No Winner
778	October 31	K-Royal Culture Festival: Palaces Awaken the Arts	Lee Seung-gi	I'll Give You All, Circle & Will You Marry Me? (orig. songs by Jo Gyu-man, Circle & Lee Seung-gi)	No Winner
778	October 31	K-Royal Culture Festival: Palaces Awaken the Arts	Kim Chang-wan Band	The Meaning Of You, Reminiscence & Love You (orig. songs by Sanulrim & Kim Chang-wan)	No Winner
778	October 31	K-Royal Culture Festival: Palaces Awaken the Arts	All Performers	Arirang (orig. folk song)	No Winner
779	November 7	A Jeon Yu-seong Special Without Him	Team Gag Concert (Park Eun-young, Shin Yoon-seung, Song Pil-geun, Jo Su-yeon, Hong Hyun-ho, Na Hyun-young & Kim Ga-eun)	Hee Jae (orig. song by Sung Si-kyung)	No Winner
779	November 7	A Jeon Yu-seong Special Without Him	Yang Hee-eun	Love, On Its Solitude & Beautiful Things (orig. songs by Yang Hee-eun)	No Winner
779	November 7	A Jeon Yu-seong Special Without Him	Han Young-ae	Is Anybody There? & Uncrossable River (orig. songs by Han Young-ae)	No Winner
779	November 7	A Jeon Yu-seong Special Without Him	Lee Eun-gyeol	No songs, he performed several magic tricks	No Winner
779	November 7	A Jeon Yu-seong Special Without Him	Kim Shin-young (as Second Aunt Kim Da-vi)	Gimme Gimme (orig. song by Kim Shin-young)	No Winner
779	November 7	A Jeon Yu-seong Special Without Him	Kwon In-ha	Watercolor Painting On A Rainy Day & Like Rain, Like Music (orig. songs by Kwon In-ha & Kim Hyun-sik)	No Winner
779	November 7	A Jeon Yu-seong Special Without Him	Team Comedians (Kim Jeong-ryul, Lee Kyung-sil, Jo Hye-ryun, Park Joon-hyung, Zoltan, Ahn Young-mi, Kim Shin-young, Kim Jun-hyun, Lee Chan-won & Shin Dong-yup)	A few song fragments mixed with comedy sketches	No Winner
780	November 14	Wax	Kim Ki-tae	Gates Of Dawn (orig. song by Wax)	Jang Han-byul (421 points)
780	November 14	Wax	Seo J	Take Care Of Him (orig. song by Wax)	Jang Han-byul (421 points)
780	November 14	Wax	Son Seung-yeon	Fixing My Makeup (orig. song by Wax)	Jang Han-byul (421 points)
780	November 14	Wax	SeeYa	I Want To Fall In Love (orig. song by Wax)	Jang Han-byul (421 points)
780	November 14	Wax	AxMxP	Oppa (orig. song by Wax)	Jang Han-byul (421 points)
780	November 14	Wax	Jang Han-byul	Mother's Diary (orig. song by Wax)	Jang Han-byul (421 points)
781	November 21	Yoon Hang-ki's 65th Anniversary Special	Choi Sung-su	At A Starry Night (orig. song by Yoon Hang-ki)	Choi Baek-ho (447 points)
781	November 21	Yoon Hang-ki's 65th Anniversary Special	Cho Hang-jo	Everyone (orig. song by Yoon Hang-ki)	Choi Baek-ho (447 points)
781	November 21	Yoon Hang-ki's 65th Anniversary Special	Jang Gye-hyun	Where We Sing In (orig. song by Yoon Hang-ki)	Choi Baek-ho (447 points)
781	November 21	Yoon Hang-ki's 65th Anniversary Special	Choi Baek-ho	What Am I Supposed To Do? (orig. song by Yoon Hang-ki)	Choi Baek-ho (447 points)
781	November 21	Yoon Hang-ki's 65th Anniversary Special	Jang Mi-hwa	My Friend (orig. song by Yoon Hang-ki)	Choi Baek-ho (447 points)
782	November 28	Crying Nut	TBA	TBA (orig. song by TBA)	TBA (TBA points)
782	November 28	Crying Nut	TBA	TBA (orig. song by TBA)	TBA (TBA points)
782	November 28	Crying Nut	TBA	TBA (orig. song by TBA)	TBA (TBA points)
782	November 28	Crying Nut	TBA	TBA (orig. song by TBA)	TBA (TBA points)
782	November 28	Crying Nut	TBA	TBA (orig. song by TBA)	TBA (TBA points)

== Awards and nominations ==
Year	Award	Category	Recipient	Result	Ref.
2016	15th KBS Entertainment Awards	Viewers' Choice Best Program Award	Immortal Songs	Nominated	
2016	15th KBS Entertainment Awards	Top Excellence Award (Talk/Show Category)	Jung Jae-hyung	Won	
2016	15th KBS Entertainment Awards	Excellence Award (Talk/Show Category)	Moon Hee-joon	Nominated	
No 2017 KBS Entertainment Awards due to the labor union strike
2018	16th KBS Entertainment Awards	Viewers' Choice Best Program Award	Immortal Songs	Nominated	
2018	16th KBS Entertainment Awards	Grand Award (Daesang)	Shin Dong-yup	Nominated	
2018	16th KBS Entertainment Awards	Top Excellence Award (Talk/Show Category)	Moon Hee-joon	Won	
2019	17th KBS Entertainment Awards	Viewers' Choice Best Program Award	Immortal Songs	Nominated	
2019	17th KBS Entertainment Awards	Best Couple Award	Kim Tae-woo and Moon Hee-joon	Nominated	
2019	17th KBS Entertainment Awards	Producers' Special Award	Shin Dong-yup	Won	
2019	17th KBS Entertainment Awards	Excellence Award (Entertainment Category)	Kim Tae-woo	Won	
2020	18th KBS Entertainment Awards	Viewers' Choice Best Program Award	Immortal Songs	Nominated	
2020	18th KBS Entertainment Awards	Top Excellence Award (Show/Variety Category)	Hong Kyung-min	Nominated	
2020	18th KBS Entertainment Awards	Top Excellence Award (Show/Variety Category)	Kim Tae-woo	Nominated	
2020	18th KBS Entertainment Awards	Top Excellence Award (Reality Category)	Poppin' Hyun Joon and Park Ae-ri	Won	
2020	18th KBS Entertainment Awards	Excellence Award (Show/Variety Category)	Kim Shin-young	Nominated	
2020	18th KBS Entertainment Awards	Excellence Award (Show/Variety Category)	Kim Jun-hyun	Nominated	
2020	18th KBS Entertainment Awards	Rookie Award (Show/Variety Category)	Na Tae-ju	Nominated	
2021	19th KBS Entertainment Awards	Viewers' Choice Best Program Award	Immortal Songs	Nominated	
2021	19th KBS Entertainment Awards	Rookie Award (Show/Variety Category)	Lee Chan-won	Nominated	
2022	20th KBS Entertainment Awards	Viewers' Choice Best Program Award	Immortal Songs	Won	
2022	20th KBS Entertainment Awards	Grand Award (Daesang)	Shin Dong-yup	Won	
2022	20th KBS Entertainment Awards	Top Excellence Award (Show/Variety Category)	Kim Jun-hyun	Nominated	
2022	20th KBS Entertainment Awards	Excellence Award (Show/Variety Category)	Lee Chan-won	Won	
2022	20th KBS Entertainment Awards	Popularity Award	Jannabi	Won	
2023	21st KBS Entertainment Awards	Viewers' Choice Best Program Award	Immortal Songs	Won	
2023	21st KBS Entertainment Awards	Grand Award (Daesang)	Shin Dong-yup	Nominated	
2023	21st KBS Entertainment Awards	Top Excellence Award (Show/Variety Category)	Kim Jun-hyun	Won	
2024	22nd KBS Entertainment Awards	Viewers' Choice Best Program Award	Immortal Songs	Won	
2024	22nd KBS Entertainment Awards	Grand Award (Daesang)	Lee Chan-won	Won	
2024	22nd KBS Entertainment Awards	Top Excellence Award (Show/Variety Category)	Kim Jun-hyun	Nominated	
2024	22nd KBS Entertainment Awards	Entertainer of the Year	Lee Chan-won	Won	
2025	23rd KBS Entertainment Awards	Viewers' Choice Best Program Award	Immortal Songs	Nominated	
2025	23rd KBS Entertainment Awards	Grand Award (Daesang)	Lee Chan-won	Nominated	
2025	23rd KBS Entertainment Awards	Top Excellence Award (Show/Variety Category)	Kim Jun-hyun	Nominated	
2025	23rd KBS Entertainment Awards	Excellence Award (Show/Variety Category)	Forestella	Nominated	
2025	23rd KBS Entertainment Awards	Rookie of the Year (Show/Variety Category)	Zo Zazz	Nominated	
2025	23rd KBS Entertainment Awards	Popularity Award	Forestella	Won	
2025	23rd KBS Entertainment Awards	Entertainer of the Year	Lee Chan-won	Won	
