= List of awards and nominations received by Lim Young-woong =

Lim Young-woong awards and nominations
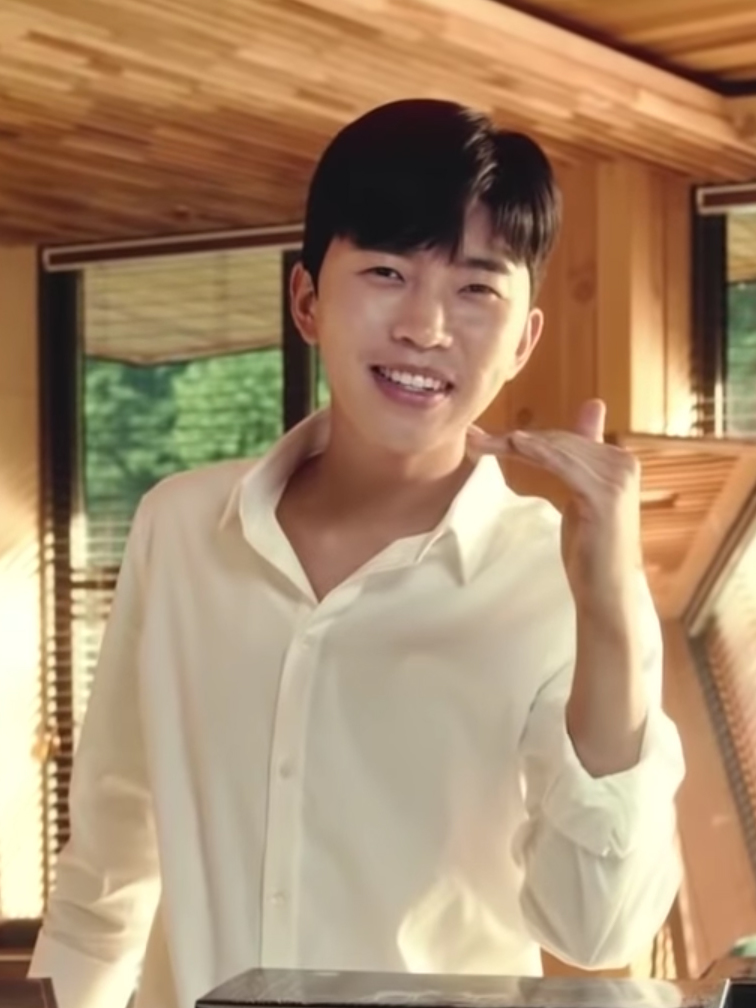
- Lim in 2020
Awards and nominations
Award	Wins	Nominations
APAN Music Awards	1	3
APAN Star Awards	2	2
Asia Artist Awards	15	18
Brand of the Year Awards	5	5
Circle Chart Music Awards	6	11
Genie Music Awards	5	7
Golden Disc Awards	4	12
Hanteo Music Awards	1	1
KCA Consumer Day Awards	1	1
K-Global Heart Dream Awards	2	2
KOMCA Copyright Awards	1	1
Korea Broadcasting Awards	1	1
Korea First Brand Awards	2	2
Korea Image Awards	1	1
Korean Music Awards	0	1
MAMA Awards	2	9
Melon Music Awards	12	19
MTN Broadcast Advertising Festival	1	1
Mubeat Awards	11	15
SBS Entertainment Awards	1	1
Seoul International Drama Awards	1	1
Seoul Music Awards	9	15
Soribada Best K-Music Awards	2	2
The Fact Music Awards	11	11
Trot Awards	6	6

Totals (Note: Certain award groups do not simply award one winner. They acknowledge several different recipients, have runners-up, and have third place. Since this is a specific recognition and is different from losing an award, runner-up mentions are considered wins in this award tally. For simplification and to avoid errors, each award in this list has been presumed to have had a prior nomination.)
- Wins: 105
- Nominations: 147

This is a list of awards and nominations received by Lim Young-woong, a South Korean trot, ballad and pop singer, entertainer and YouTuber, since his debut in 2016.

== Awards and nominations ==
Name of the award ceremony, year presented, category, nominee of the award, and the result of the nomination
Award ceremony	Year	Category	Nominee / Work	Result	Ref.
APAN Music Awards	2020	APAN Top 10 (Bonsang)	Lim Young-woong	Won	
APAN Music Awards	2020	Best Solo – Male (Global)	Lim Young-woong	Nominated	
APAN Music Awards	2020	KT Seezn Star Award – Singer	Lim Young-woong	Nominated	
APAN Star Awards	2022	Best Original Soundtrack	"Love Always Runs Away"	Won	
APAN Star Awards	2025	Best Original Soundtrack	"More Beautiful than Heaven"	Won	
Asia Artist Awards	2020	Trot of the Year (Daesang)	Lim Young-woong	Won	
Asia Artist Awards	2020	Popularity Award (Trot)	Lim Young-woong	Won	
Asia Artist Awards	2020	AAA Hot Issue Award (Music)	Lim Young-woong	Won	
Asia Artist Awards	2021	Male Solo Singer Popularity Award	Lim Young-woong	Won	
Asia Artist Awards	2021	U+Idol Live Popularity Award – Singer	Lim Young-woong	Won	
Asia Artist Awards	2021	Trot of the Year (Daesang)	Lim Young-woong	Won	
Asia Artist Awards	2021	Best OST Award	"Love Always Runs Away"	Won	
Asia Artist Awards	2022	Stage of the Year (Daesang)	Lim Young-woong	Won	
Asia Artist Awards	2022	Hot Trend Award	Lim Young-woong	Won	
Asia Artist Awards	2022	Fabulous Award	Lim Young-woong	Won	
Asia Artist Awards	2022	DCM Popularity Award – Singer	Lim Young-woong	Won	
Asia Artist Awards	2022	Popularity Award – Singer	Lim Young-woong	Nominated	
Asia Artist Awards	2023	Fandom of the Year (Daesang)	Hero Generation	Won	
Asia Artist Awards	2023	Fabulous Award	Lim Young-woong	Won	
Asia Artist Awards	2023	Hot Trend Award	Lim Young-woong	Won	
Asia Artist Awards	2023	Best Choice Award	Lim Young-woong	Won	
Asia Artist Awards	2023	Popularity Award - Singer	Lim Young-woong	Won	
Asia Artist Awards	2026	Popularity Award – Solo (Male)	Lim Young-woong	Pending	
Asia Star Entertainer Awards	2024	The Best Solo	Lim Young-woong	Won	
Asia Star Entertainer Awards	2024	Fan Choice Artist	Lim Young-woong	Won	
Brand of the Year Awards	2020	Advertising Model (Male)	Lim Young-woong	Won	(Note: The actual awards ceremony was held on October 12, 2020.)
Brand of the Year Awards	2020	Trot Singer (Male)	Lim Young-woong	Won	(Note: The actual awards ceremony was held on October 12, 2020.)
Brand of the Year Awards	2021	Advertising Model (Male)	Lim Young-woong	Won	
Brand of the Year Awards	2021	Trot Singer (Male)	Lim Young-woong	Won	
Brand of the Year Awards	2022	Advertising Model of The Year – Male	Lim Young-woong	Won	
Circle Chart Music Awards	2021	Song of the Year – November	"Hero"	Nominated	
Circle Chart Music Awards	2021	Mubeat Global Choice Award (Male)	Lim Young-woong	Won	
Circle Chart Music Awards	2022	Song of the Year – March	"My Starry Love"	Nominated	
Circle Chart Music Awards	2022	The Adult Contemporary Music of the Year	"My Starry Love"	Won	
Circle Chart Music Awards	2022	Mubeat Global Choice Award – Male	Lim Young-woong	Nominated	
Circle Chart Music Awards	2023	Solo Artist of the Year – Male	Lim Young-woong	Won	
Circle Chart Music Awards	2023	Music Steady Seller of the Year	"Love Always Runs Away"	Won	
Circle Chart Music Awards	2023	Idolplus Global Artist Award	Lim Young-woong	Nominated	
Circle Chart Music Awards	2023	Mubeat Global Choice – Male	Lim Young-woong	Won	
Circle Chart Music Awards	2024	Artist of the Year – Digital	"Do or Die	Nominated	
Circle Chart Music Awards	2024	Mubeat Global Choice Award – Male	Lim Young-woong	Won	
Genie Music Awards	2020	Artist of the Year (Daesang)	Lim Young-woong	Won	
Genie Music Awards	2020	Best Trot Track	"Trust in Me"	Won	
Genie Music Awards	2022	Song of the Year (Daesang)	"Our Blues, Our Life"	Won	
Genie Music Awards	2022	Best Male Solo Artist	Lim Young-woong	Won	
Genie Music Awards	2022	Genie Music Popularity Award	Lim Young-woong	Won	
Genie Music Awards	2022	Album of the Year (Daesang)	Im Hero	Nominated	
Genie Music Awards	2022	Singer of the Year (Daesang)	Lim Young-woong	Nominated	
Golden Disc Awards	2021	Best Digital Song (Bonsang)	"Trust in Me"	Nominated	
Golden Disc Awards	2021	Popularity Award	Lim Young-woong	Nominated	
Golden Disc Awards	2021	Best Trot Award	Lim Young-woong	Won	
Golden Disc Awards	2022	Best Digital Song (Bonsang)	"My Starry Love"	Nominated	
Golden Disc Awards	2022	Best Solo Artist	Lim Young-woong	Won	
Golden Disc Awards	2022	Most Popular Artist Award	Lim Young-woong	Nominated	
Golden Disc Awards	2023	Best Digital Song (Bonsang)	"Our Blues, Our Life"	Won	
Golden Disc Awards	2023	Best Digital Daesang	"Our Blues, Our Life"	Nominated	
Golden Disc Awards	2023	Best Album (Bonsang)	Im Hero	Nominated	
Golden Disc Awards	2023	TikTok Most Popular Artist Award	Lim Young-woong	Nominated	
Golden Disc Awards	2024	Best Digital Song (Bonsang)	"London Boy"	Nominated	
Golden Disc Awards	2024	Most Popular Artist Award - Male	Lim Young-woong	Won	
Hanteo Music Awards	2021	Special Award – Trot	Lim Young-woong	Won	
KCA Consumer Day Awards	2020	Best Celebrity from a Variety Show (co-awarded with Young Tak and Lee Chan-won)	Mr. Trot	Won	
K-Global Heart Dream Awards	2022	Global Favorite Idol Trot Popularity Award	Lim Young-woong	Won	
K-Global Heart Dream Awards	2023	Favorite Idol Fandom Donation Award	Lim Young-woong	Won	
KOMCA Copyright Awards	2025	Song of the Year	Do or Die	Won	
Korea Broadcasting Awards	2026	Best Male Entertainer Award	Little Island, Big Hero	Won	
Korea First Brand Awards	2021	Best Trot Singer	Lim Young-woong	Won	
Korea First Brand Awards	2026	Male Advertising Model	Lim Young-woong	Won	
Korea Image Awards	2021	Stepping Stone Award (given as a member of Trot Men)	Lim Young-woong	Won	
Korean Music Awards	2023	Best Pop Album	Im Hero	Nominated	
MAMA Awards	2022	Artist of the Year	Lim Young-woong	Nominated	
MAMA Awards	2022	Best Male Artist	Lim Young-woong	Won	
MAMA Awards	2022	Song of the Year	"Our Blues, Our Life"	Nominated	
MAMA Awards	2022	Best Vocal Performance – Solo	"Our Blues, Our Life"	Nominated	
MAMA Awards	2023	Artist of the Year	Lim Young-woong	Longlisted	
MAMA Awards	2023	Worldwide Fans' Choice Top 10	Lim Young-woong	Won	
MAMA Awards	2023	Best Male Artist	Lim Young-woong	Nominated	
MAMA Awards	2023	Song of the Year	"London Boy"	Longlisted	
MAMA Awards	2023	Best Vocal Performance – Solo	"London Boy"	Nominated	
Melon Music Awards	2020	Top 10 Artists (Bonsang)	Lim Young-woong	Won	
Melon Music Awards	2020	Artist of the Year (Daesang)	Lim Young-woong	Nominated	
Melon Music Awards	2020	Best Trot Award	"Trust in Me"	Won	
Melon Music Awards	2020	Netizen Popularity Award	Lim Young-woong	Nominated	
Melon Music Awards	2020	Hot Trend Award (nominated as a member of Trot Men 6)	Lim Young-woong	Won	
Melon Music Awards	2021	Best Male Solo Artist	Lim Young-woong	Won	
Melon Music Awards	2021	Top 10 Artist Award	Lim Young-woong	Won	
Melon Music Awards	2021	Artist of the Year (Daesang)	Lim Young-woong	Nominated	
Melon Music Awards	2022	Artist of the Year (Daesang)	Lim Young-woong	Won	
Melon Music Awards	2022	Best Male Solo Artist	Lim Young-woong	Won	
Melon Music Awards	2022	Netizen Popularity Award	Lim Young-woong	Won	
Melon Music Awards	2022	Top 10 Artist Award	Lim Young-woong	Won	
Melon Music Awards	2022	Album of the Year (Daesang)	Im Hero	Won	
Melon Music Awards	2023	Top 10 Artist Award	Lim Young-woong	Won	
Melon Music Awards	2023	Artist of the Year (Daesang)	Lim Young-woong	Nominated	
Melon Music Awards	2023	Best Male Solo Artist	Lim Young-woong	Nominated	
Melon Music Awards	2023	Favorite Star Award	Lim Young-woong	Nominated	
Melon Music Awards	2025	Top 10 Artist	Lim Young-woong	Won	
Melon Music Awards	2025	Artist of the Year (Daesang)	Lim Young-woong	Nominated	
MTN Broadcast Advertising Festival	2020	CF Star Award	Lim Young-woong	Won	
Mubeat Awards	2020	Song of the Year	"Trust in Me"	Won	
Mubeat Awards	2020	Music Video of the Year	"Hero"	Won	
Mubeat Awards	2020	Artist of the Month Grand Finalist	Lim Young-woong	Nominated	
Mubeat Awards	2020	Best Male Solo	Lim Young-woong	Won	
Mubeat Awards	2021	Artist of the Year	Lim Young-woong	Won	
Mubeat Awards	2021	Best Male Solo	Lim Young-woong	Won	
Mubeat Awards	2021	Trot Star of the Year	Lim Young-woong	Won	
Mubeat Awards	2021	Music Video of the Year	"My Starry Love"	Won	
Mubeat Awards	2021	Song of the Year	"My Starry Love"	Won	
Mubeat Awards	2022	Artist of the Year	Lim Young-woong	Won	
Mubeat Awards	2022	Best Solo Artist	Lim Young-woong	Won	
Mubeat Awards	2022	Song of the Year	"Rainbow"	Won	
Mubeat Awards	2023	Artist of the Year	Lim Young-woong	Nominated	
Mubeat Awards	2023	Best Solo Artist	Lim Young-woong	Nominated	
Mubeat Awards	2023	Song of the Year	"Do or Die"	Nominated	
SBS Entertainment Awards	2025	ESG Award	Island Bachelor Hero	Won	
Seoul International Drama Awards	2022	Outstanding Korean Drama OST	"Love Always Runs"	Won	
Seoul Music Awards	2021	Best Trot Award	Lim Young-woong	Won	
Seoul Music Awards	2021	Popularity Award	Lim Young-woong	Won	
Seoul Music Awards	2021	K-wave Popularity Award	Lim Young-woong	Nominated	
Seoul Music Awards	2022	Main Award (Bonsang)	Lim Young-woong	Won	
Seoul Music Awards	2022	Popularity Award	Lim Young-woong	Won	
Seoul Music Awards	2022	K-wave Popularity Award	Lim Young-woong	Nominated	
Seoul Music Awards	2022	Best Trot Award	Lim Young-woong	Won	
Seoul Music Awards	2022	Best OST Award	"Love Always Runs"	Won	
Seoul Music Awards	2023	Main Award (Bonsang)	Lim Young-woong	Won	
Seoul Music Awards	2023	Popularity Award	Lim Young-woong	Won	
Seoul Music Awards	2023	K-wave Popularity Award	Lim Young-woong	Nominated	
Seoul Music Awards	2024	Main Award (Bonsang)	Lim Young-woong	Won	
Seoul Music Awards	2024	Best Trot Award	Lim Young-woong	Nominated	
Seoul Music Awards	2024	Popularity Award	Lim Young-woong	Nominated	
Seoul Music Awards	2024	K-wave Popularity Award	Lim Young-woong	Nominated	
Soribada Best K-Music Awards	2020	Main Prize (Bonsang)	Lim Young-woong	Won	
Soribada Best K-Music Awards	2020	Trot Popularity Award	Lim Young-woong	Won	
The Fact Music Awards	2020	Fan N Star Trot Popularity Award	Lim Young-woong	Won	
The Fact Music Awards	2020	Fan N Star Best Ads. Award	Lim Young-woong	Won	
The Fact Music Awards	2021	Fan N Star Most Votes Award	Lim Young-woong	Won	
The Fact Music Awards	2021	Fan N Star Best Ads. Award	Lim Young-woong	Won	
The Fact Music Awards	2021	Fan N Star Trot Popularity Award	Lim Young-woong	Won	
The Fact Music Awards	2022	Fan N Star Angel N Star Award	Lim Young-woong	Won	
The Fact Music Awards	2022	Artist of the Year (Bonsang)	Lim Young-woong	Won	
The Fact Music Awards	2022	Fan N Star Best Ads. Award	Lim Young-woong	Won	
The Fact Music Awards	2022	Fan N Star Trot Popularity Award	Lim Young-woong	Won	
The Fact Music Awards	2022	Fan N Star Most Votes Award	Lim Young-woong	Won	
The Fact Music Awards	2026	TMA Popularity Award	Lim Young-woong	Won	
Trot Awards	2020	Best New Artist (Male)	Lim Young-woong	Won	
Trot Awards	2020	K-Trotainer Award	Lim Young-woong	Won	
Trot Awards	2020	Global Star Award	Lim Young-woong	Won	
Trot Awards	2020	Trot Singer Award Voted by Teenagers	Lim Young-woong	Won	
Trot Awards	2020	Digital Star Award	Lim Young-woong	Won	
Trot Awards	2020	Popularity Award (Male)	Lim Young-woong	Won	

== Other accolades ==
=== Singing contests ===
Name of the contest, year presented, and the result of the contest
Contest	Year	Result	Ref.
Gochang Gusipo Singing Contest	2015	Bronze Prize	
Inet TV Youth Trot Singing Contest of the First Half Year	2015	Gold Prize	
Inet TV Youth Trot Singing Contest of the Second Half Year	2015	Silver Prize	
Korea Sings	2016	Excellence Prize (Note: "If You Smile, You'll Get Younger, If You Get Angry, You'll Only Get Older")	
Mr. Trot	2020	First place out of 17,000 applicants	
Pocheon Citizen Singing Contest	2015	Excellence Prize (Note: "What's Wrong with My Age?")	

=== State honors ===
Name of country, year given, and name of honor
Country	Year	Honor	Ref.
South Korea (Note: Honors are given at the Korean Popular Culture and Arts Awards, arranged by the Korea Creative Content Agency and hosted by the Ministry of Culture, Sports and Tourism. They are awarded to those who have contributed to the arts and South Korea's pop culture.)	2020	Minister of Culture, Sports and Tourism Commendation	(Note: Lim received this commendation after his four-year career of making contributions, the shortest among that year's recipients.)

=== Listicles ===
Name of publisher, year listed, name of listicle, and placement
Publisher	Year	Listicle	Placement	Ref.
Forbes	2021	Korea Power Celebrity 40	5th	
Forbes	2022	Korea Power Celebrity 40	7th	
Forbes	2023	Korea Power Celebrity 40	6th	
Forbes	2024	Korea Power Celebrity 40	5th	
Forbes	2025	Korea Power Celebrity 40	5th	
Gallup Korea	2024	Korea's Favorite Singer	1st	
Golden Disc Awards	2025	Golden Disc Powerhouse 40	Placed	
