= My Starry Love =

2021 single by Lim Young-woong

Single by Lim Young-woong

from the album Im Hero
- Language: Korean
- Released: March 9, 2021
- Recorded: 2021
- Studio: Studio J (Seoul)
- Genre: K-pop; trot
- Length: 3:50
- Label: Tizzo C&C; New Era Project; Mulgogi Music; Kakao Entertainment
- Composer: Seol Woon-do
- Lyricist: Seol

Lim Young-woong singles chronology
"Hero" (2020)	"My Starry Love" (2021)	"Our Blues, Our Life" (2022)

Audio video
- "My Starry Love" on YouTube

Music video
- "My Starry Love" on YouTube

"My Starry Love" (Korean: 별빛 같은 나의 사랑아; RR: Byeolbit gateun naui saranga; lit. 'My Love like Starlight') is a song recorded by South Korean trot singer Lim Young-woong. It was released as a digital single on March 9, 2021, through Tizzo C&C, New Era Project, Mulgogi Music and Kakao Entertainment. Penned by veteran trot singer-songwriter Seol Woon-do, the song's musical style focuses on authentic trot music, while the lyrics are about a person's love for those who have stood by him or her for a long time. Prior to its release, Lim premiered the song at the finals of the second season of Miss Trot.

Commercially, "My Starry Love" was a success in South Korea, topping the Gaon Digital Chart and becoming the singer's first number-one single. The song also earned Lim the first music program award ever since his debut, winning first place on Show! Music Core. This feat made him the first trot artist to receive a music show win in 14 years since 2007.

== Background and release ==
"My Starry Love" was written and composed by Seol Woon-do, one of South Korea's best-known trot singer-songwriters. (Note: Lim had previously covered Seol's 1997 song "Purple-Colored Postcard" (보라빛 엽서; Borabit yeopseo) at the semi-finals of Mr. Trot.) Unlike the singer's previous singles "Trust in Me" and "Hero", the song's musical style focuses on authentic trot music. The lyrics of the song describe a person's love for those who have stood by him or her for a long time, in a calm manner. "From the beginning of the songwriting stage, I made this song thinking only about Lim," said Seol. The song was mastered by Stuart Hawkes, a world-renowned engineer at Metropolis Studios in London.

On February 27, 2021, Lim uploaded a video titled "A Letter to You" (당신에게 보내는 편지; Dangsinege bonaeneun pyeonji) on his official YouTube channel. After expressing love and gratitude towards his fans, he asked for their opinions about his upcoming song through questions at the end of the clip; "Are you waiting for Lim Young-woong's new song? What kind of song do you want for the next time? Please tell me what you have in mind with comments."

Three days later, it was officially announced that Lim would release a new single on March 9 at 18:00 KST, one year after his winning Mr. Trot. Five days prior to its release, the song's title "My Starry Love" was revealed. He premiered the song at the finals of the second season of Miss Trot held on that day. The single's cover artwork and music video teasers were subsequently unveiled. An accompanying music video starring ballerino Lim Woo-jin, was directed by Kim Ho-bin and uploaded to Kakao Entertainment's official YouTube channel, in conjunction with the release of the single. (Note: Kim has been known for directing music videos for K-pop artists such as Zion.T, Sunwoo Jung-a and Baek Ye-rin.) Combined, the music video has garnered more than 13 million views on YouTube as of March 31, 2021.

== Commercial performance ==
"My Starry Love" was a commercial success in South Korea. Upon release, the song debuted atop the Gaon Digital Chart for the issue dated March 7–13, 2021, becoming Lim's first number-one single there since his debut. It stayed in the top five for four consecutive weeks. The song also topped the component Download Chart for four consecutive weeks, giving the singer his third number-one song on the aforementioned chart following "Trust in Me" and "Hero". Additionally, it was the third best-performing song of March that year on the Gaon Digital Chart.

On March 20, 2021, "My Starry Love" earned Lim the first music program award of his career, winning first place on MBC's Show! Music Core. This made him the first trot artist to receive a music show win since Kang Jin was given his trophy for the song "Wild Bee" (땡벌; Ttaengbeol) on KBS2's Music Bank in September 2007. Lim won another trophy with "My Starry Love" on SBS MTV's The Show which aired three days later. On March 31 of the same year, he took his third win with the song on SBS F!L's The Trot Show.

== Live performances ==
Following the release of "My Starry Love", Lim performed the song on the 46th episode of TV Chosun's Romantic Call Centre which aired on March 12, 2021. On the show, he described this song as a response to the unlimited love from his fans, saying "Stars that we see are actually very big although they look small. The same is true of fans' love. Small as it may seem at a glance, the depth will be massive." He then promoted the song on various music programs including M Countdown, Show! Music Core, The Show and Show Champion, from March 18 to 27 that year. Lim also sang the song as a duet with its songwriter Seol during the 45th episode of TV Chosun's Ppongsoongah School which aired on March 31, 2021.

== Track listings and formats ==
- Digital download and streaming
1. "My Starry Love" – 3:50
2. "My Starry Love" (Instrumental) – 3:50

== Credits and personnel ==
Credits and personnel are adapted from Melon.

- Lim Young-woong – vocals
- Seol Woon-do – lyricist, composer
- Song Gi-young – arranger, guitar
- Kang Yoon-gi – drums
- Shin Hyeon-gwon – bass
- Park Young-yong – percussions
- Park Gwang-min – guitar
- Jo Sang-won – piano, synthesizer
- Kim Won-yong – saxophone
- Kim Dong-ha – trumpet
- Jam String (Bae Shin-hee and four others) – string
- Kim Hyeon-ah – background vocals
- Jeong Moon-won (Studio J) – recording
- Park Se-jin (Studio J) – recording
- Choi Jong-ho (Velvet Sound) – mixing
- Stuart Hawkes (Metropolis Studios) – mastering

== Charts ==
=== Weekly charts ===
Chart (2021)	Peak position
South Korea (Gaon)	1

=== Monthly charts ===
Chart (March 2021)	Peak position
South Korea (Gaon)	3

== Accolades ==
=== Music program awards ===
Program	Network	Date	Ref.
Show! Music Core	MBC	March 20, 2021	
The Show	SBS MTV	March 23, 2021	
The Trot Show	SBS F!L	March 31, 2021	

== Release history ==
Region	Date	Format(s)	Label	Ref.
Various	March 9, 2021	Digital download; streaming	Tizzo C&C; New Era Project; Mulgogi Music; Kakao Entertainment	

== See also ==
- List of Gaon Digital Chart number ones of 2021
- List of Show! Music Core Chart winners (2021)
- List of The Show Chart winners (2021)
