= 2022 Melon Music Awards =

South Korean music award show

- 2022 MMA title card
- Date: November 26, 2022
- Location: Gocheok Sky Dome, Seoul, South Korea
- Presented by: Melon

Highlights
- Most awards: Lim Young-woong (5)
- Most nominations: Ive (6)
- Website: MMA 2022

Television/radio coverage
- Network: 1theK (YouTube channel); Melon; KakaoTV; Wavve; U-NEXT (Japan); CXO Media (Indonesia); FPT Play (Vietnam)

The 2022 Melon Music Awards was held on November 26, 2022, at the Gocheok Sky Dome in Seoul, South Korea. Organized by Kakao M through its online music store Melon, the 2022 ceremony was the fourteenth installment of the event and its first fully offline ceremony since 2019. Artists who released music between November 8, 2021, and November 3, 2022, are eligible for the awards.

Lim Young-woong won two daesangs—Artist of the Year and Album of the Year, while BTS were awarded the Record of the Year. Ive won the Song of the Year, the group's first ever daesang win, alongside Best New Artist with NewJeans, marking the first time two female acts won in the rookie category during the same ceremony.

== Judging criteria ==
Division	Online Voting	Digital Sales	Judge Score
Top 10 Artists	20%	80%	—
Main awards*	20%	60%	20%
Genre Awards**	—	70%	30%
Popularity Awards***	60%	40%	—
KakaoBank Everyone's Star Award	80%	—	20%
Special Awards****	—	—	100%
*Artist of the Year, Album of the Year, Song of the Year, Best New Artist, Best Male/Female Solo, Best Male/Female Group; **Best Pop Artist, Best Collaboration, OST, Hot Trend Award, Project Music Award; ***Netizen Popularity Award; ****Record of the Year, Music Video of the Year Award, Songwriter Award, 1theK Performance Award, 1theK Original Contents Award, Global Rising Artist, Best Performance Director, Best Session Instrumental, Best Music Style

=== Voting ===
Voting for categories opened for South Korean residents on the Melon Music website on November 4 and will continue until November 18, 2022. Only artists who released music between November 8, 2021, and November 3, 2022, are eligible. The longlist of nominees was selected based on the chart performance criteria (60% downloads and 40% streams) for each artist combined with weekly Melon Popularity Award votes achieved during the eligibility period. Categories that are open to online voting include: Top 10 Artists, Album of the Year, Song of the Year, Best New Artist, Best Male Solo, Best Female Solo, Best Male Group, Best Female Group, and Netizen Popularity Award.

== Performers ==
List of musical performances
Artist	Song(s)	Segment
Be'O	"Counting Stars" / "Complex" / "Burnout Syndrome"	Run To Dream
STAYC	"Beautiful Monster"	Amor vincit omnia
ATBO	"Attitude" / "Monochrome (Color)"	The Beginning of a Journey
Enhypen	"Blessed-Cursed" / "Future Perfect (Pass the Mic)"	New Moon
NewJeans	"Cookie" / "Hype Boy" / "Attention"	We Are <NewJeans>
Gomak Boys (Note: Project group consisting of Paul Kim, Kim Min-seok, Jung Seung-hwan, Ha Hyun-sang, and Big Naughty.)	"You and Me" / "Sweet Thing"	Just The Beginning
Le Sserafim	"Fearless" / "The Hydra" / "Antifragile"	I'm Fearless
Ive	"Eleven" (Liz piano solo) / "Love Dive" (remix) / "After Like"	Colorful Atlantis
Tomorrow X Together	"Good Boy Gone Bad"	From blood and ash, We will rise
MeloMance	"Drunken Confession" / "Love, Maybe"	If Love? It's Now
(G)I-dle	"Nxde" / "Tomboy"	The ()I-dle
10cm and Big Naughty	"Just 10 Centimetres" / "Beyond Love"	IN(S)FP concerto
Monsta X	"Love" (Jazz ver.) / "Rush Hour"	Destroy the Limits of Love
Lim Young-woong	"London Boy" / "Polaroid" / "If We Ever Meet Again" (Orchestra ver.)	Higher Than Hero

== Presenters ==
- Kim Hyang-gi – Top 10 Artist Award
- Jonathan Thona and Patricia Thona – Best Performance
- Song Ye-rin – 2022 Choice
- Bae Hyun-sung and Park Ji-hu – Best Songwriter & Best Music Style
- Leo J – Global Artist & Global Rising Artist
- Lee Sun-bin – Top 10 Artist Award
- Haha and Shin Hyun-ji – Best Male – Solo & Best Group – Female
- Jasson and Hong Hyun-hee – Netizen Choice & Best Music Video
- Go Min-si – Top 10 Artist Award
- Moon Sang-min and Yang Hye-ji – 1theK Global Icon & Hot Trend
- Chung Sung-hwa – Best New Artist
- Ahn Hyo-seop and Kim Se-jeong – Best OST & Best Collaboration
- Lee Soo-hyuk – Album of the Year & Record of the Year
- Cha Seung-won – Best Song of the Year & Artist of the Year

== Winners and nominees ==
Nominations were announced via the Melon website on November 4, 2022. Winners are listed first and highlighted in bold.

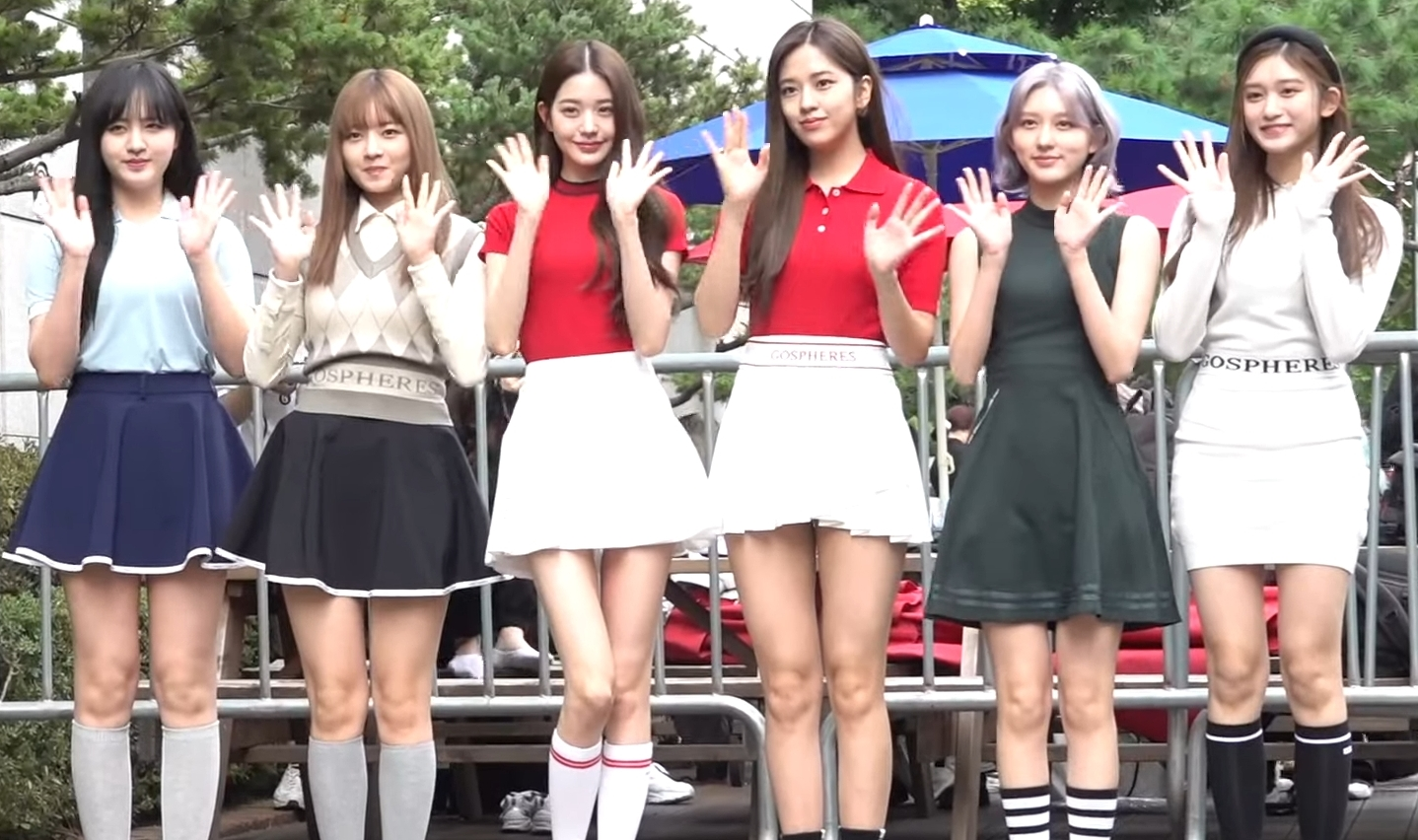
Ive won 4 awards, including Song of the Year, Best New Artist, Best Female Group and Top 10 Artists

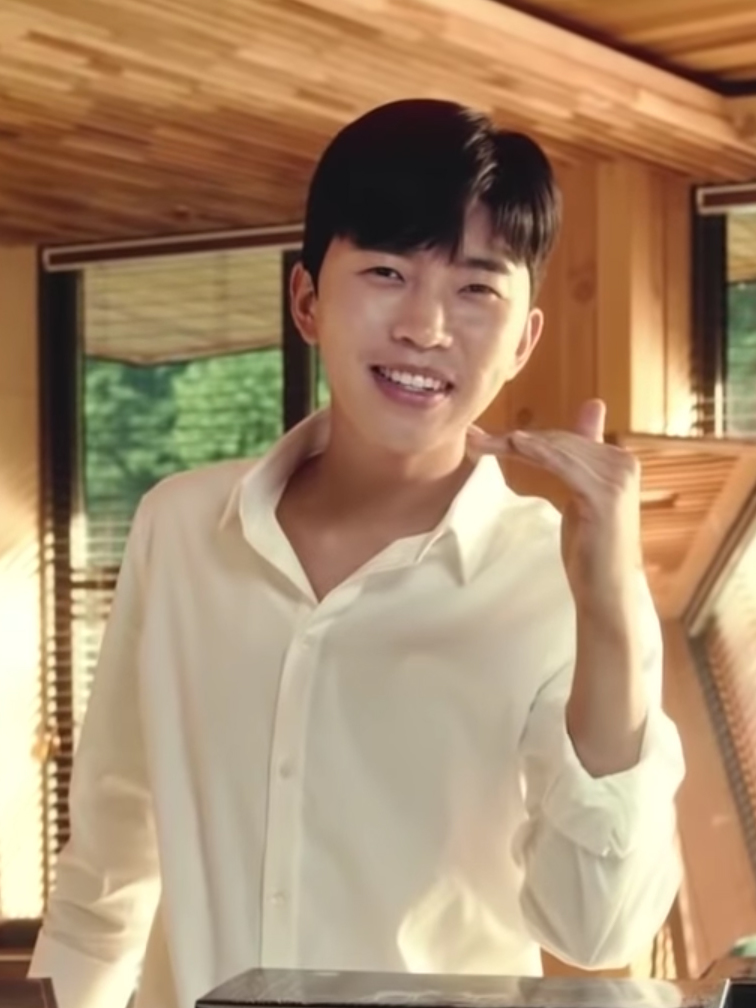
Lim Young-woong won 5 awards, including Artist and Album of the Year

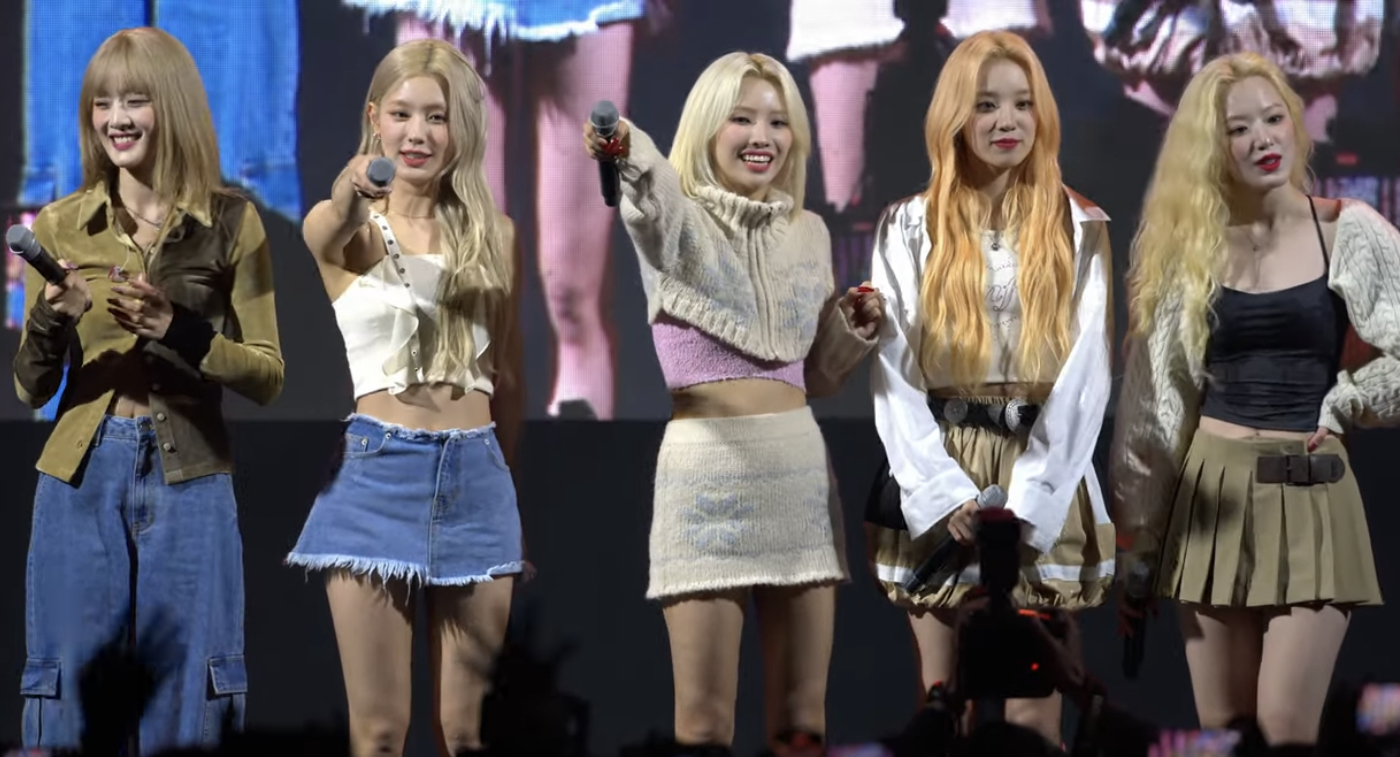
(G)I-dle won 2 awards, including Music Video of the Year and Top 10 Artists

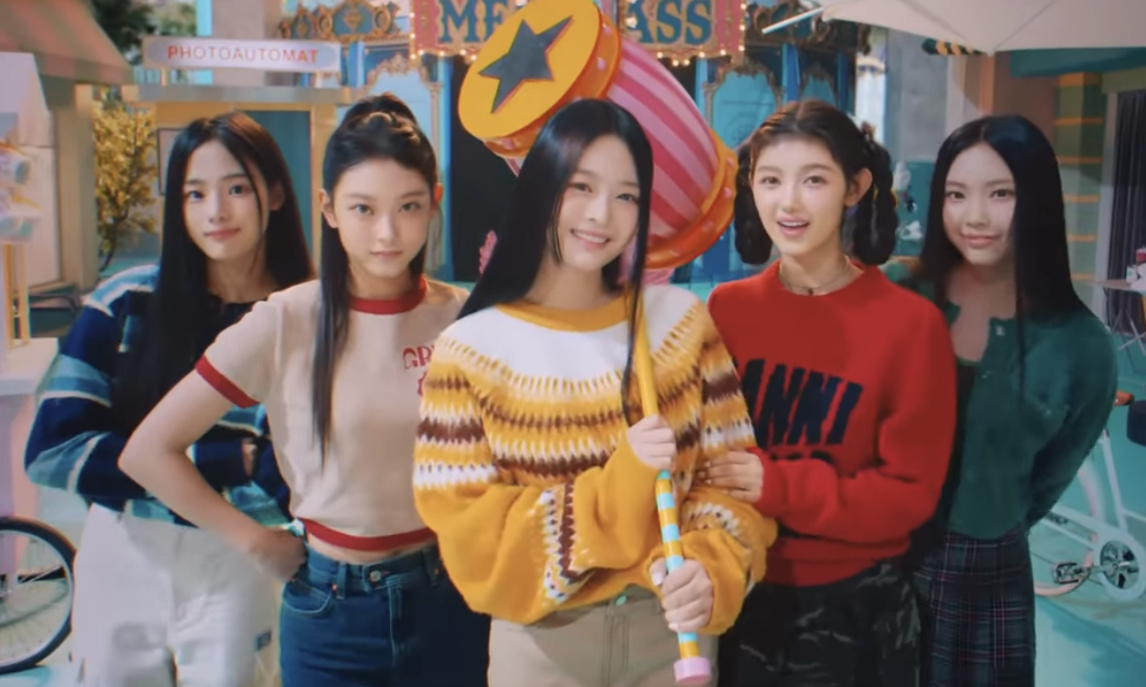
NewJeans won 2 awards, including Best New Artist and Top 10 Artists

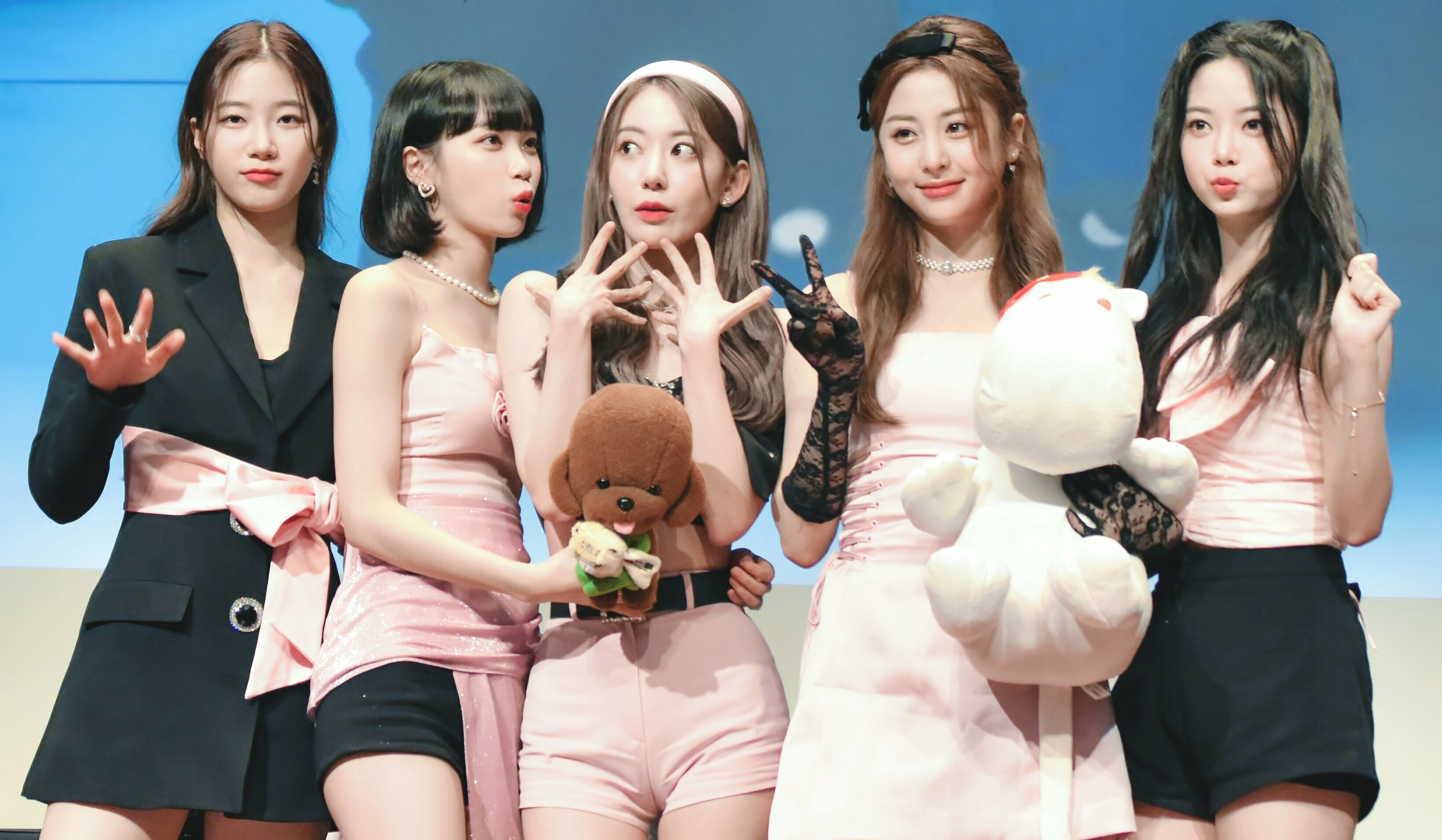
Le Sserafim won 2 awards, including Hot Trend and Best Female Performance

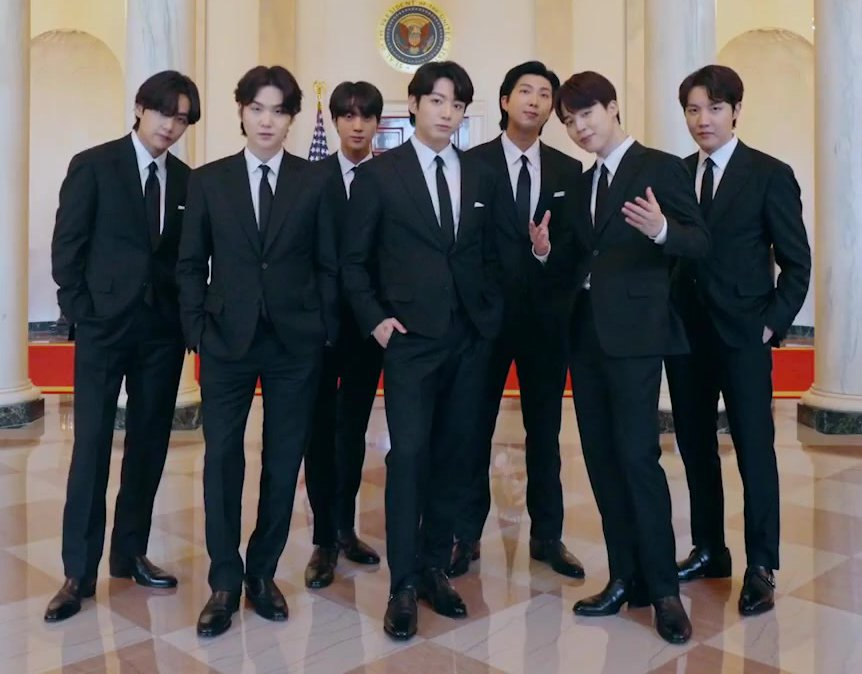
BTS won 4 awards, including Record of the Year and Best Male Group

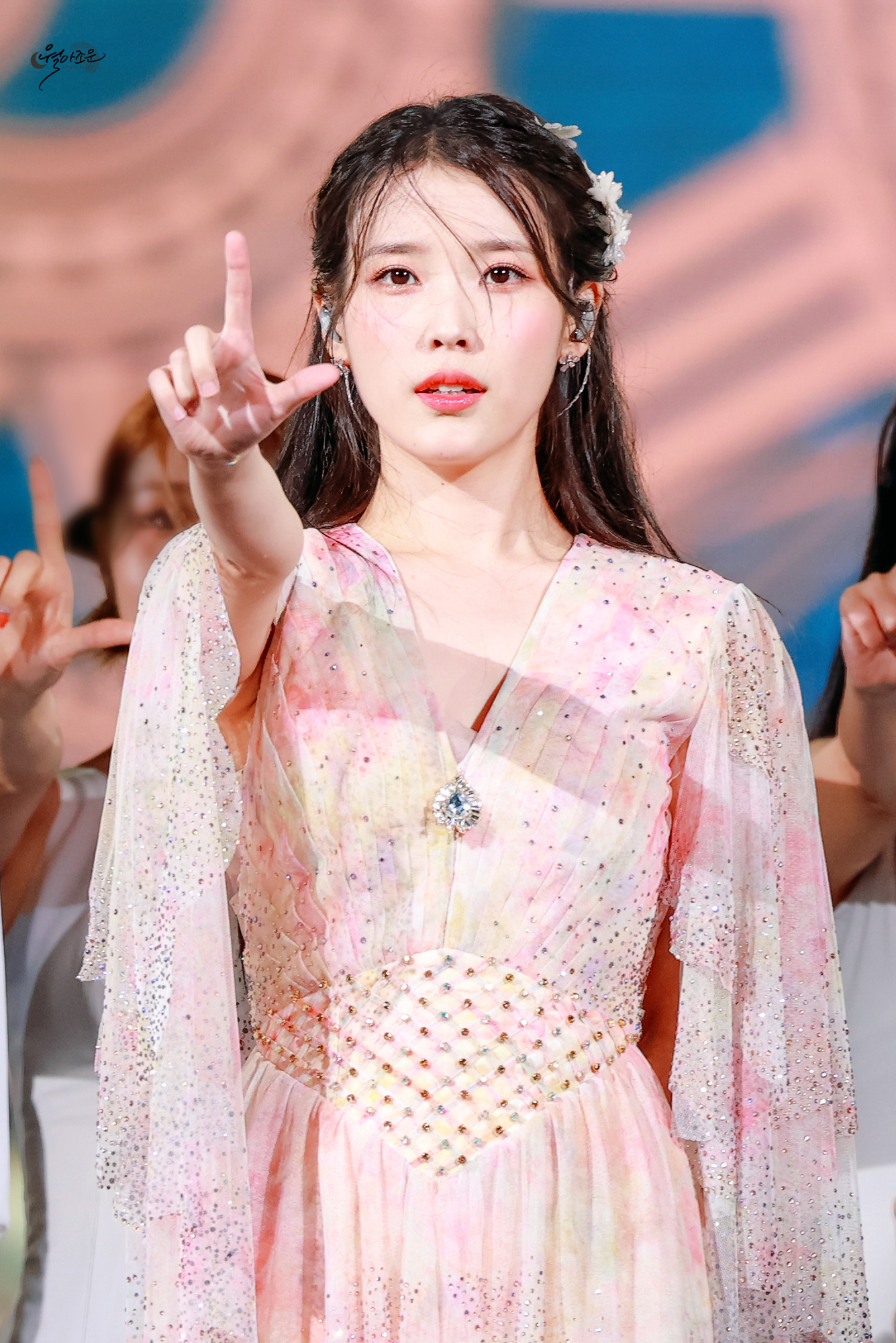
IU won 3 awards, including Best Female Solo Artist, Best Stage and Top 10 Artists

Top 10 Artists (Bonsang)	Song of the Year (Daesang)
**(G)I-dle**; **Ive**; **Lim Young-woong**; **MeloMance**; **NewJeans**; **Be'O**; **BTS**; **IU**; **Seventeen**; **NCT Dream**; List of nominated artists: 10cm; Aespa; Big Bang; Big Naughty; Blackpink; Bolbbalgan4; Jay Park; Juho; Kassy; KyoungSeo; Le Sserafim; Lee Mujin; Psy; Red Velvet; Sokodomo; STAYC; Taeyeon; Tophyun; WSG Wannabe; Yena	**Ive – "Love Dive"**; Big Bang – "Still Life"; (G)I-dle – "Tomboy"; Kim Min-seok – "Drunken Confession"; Psy – "That That" (featuring Suga)
Artist of the Year (Daesang)	KakaoBank Album of the Year (Daesang)
**Lim Young-woong**; MeloMance; BTS; (G)I-dle; Ive	**Lim Young-woong – Im Hero**; (G)I-dle – I Never Die; IU – Pieces; NewJeans – New Jeans; Psy – Psy 9th
Record of the Year (Daesang)	Best New Artist
**BTS**	**Ive**; **NewJeans**; Billlie; Kep1er; Le Sserafim; Nmixx
Best Male Solo	Best Female Solo
**Lim Young-woong**; 10cm; Be'O; Big Naughty; Psy	**IU**; Kassy; KyoungSeo; Taeyeon; Choi Ye-na
Best Male Group	Best Female Group
**BTS**; Big Bang; Monsta X; NCT Dream; Seventeen	**Ive**; Aespa; Blackpink; (G)I-dle; NewJeans
Best OST	Best Collaboration
**MeloMance – "Love, Maybe" (from Business Proposal)**	**10cm and Big Naughty – "Beyond Love"**
Netizen Popularity Award	Hot Trend
**Lim Young-woong**; Big Bang; BTS; Blackpink; Ha Sung-woon; Ive; Kim Ho-joong; NCT Dream; NCT 127; Seventeen	**Le Sserafim**

=== Other awards ===
Award	Winner(s)
Best Performance	Tomorrow X Together; Le Sserafim
Best Pop Artist	Charlie Puth
Best Songwriter	Jeon So-yeon
Best Music Style	Big Naughty
Global Artist	Monsta X
Global Rising Artist	STAYC
Music Video of the Year	(G)I-dle – "Tomboy"
1theK Global Icon	Enhypen
KakaoBank Everyone's Star	BTS
Project Music Award	WSG Wannabe
Best Session	Lee Shin-woo
Stage of the Year	IU – The Golden Hour: Under the Orange Sun

=== Multiple awards ===
The following artist(s) received three or more awards:

Count	Artist(s)
5	Lim Young-woong
4	BTS
4	Ive
3	IU
