= Melon Music Award for Artist of the Year =

South Korean music award

- Country: South Korea
- Presented by: Kakao M
- First award: 2005 (online); 2009 (ceremony)
- Currently held by: BTS – (2026)

Highlights
- Most wins: BTS (4)
- Most nominations: IU, BTS
- Website: Official website

The Melon Music Award for Artist of the Year is an accolade presented by Kakao M at the annual Melon Music Awards. The Artist of the Year award was first given at its inaugural online ceremony in 2005; since 2009, it consists of the most prestigious awards given at the event, alongside Album of the Year and Song of the Year.

== Winners and nominees ==
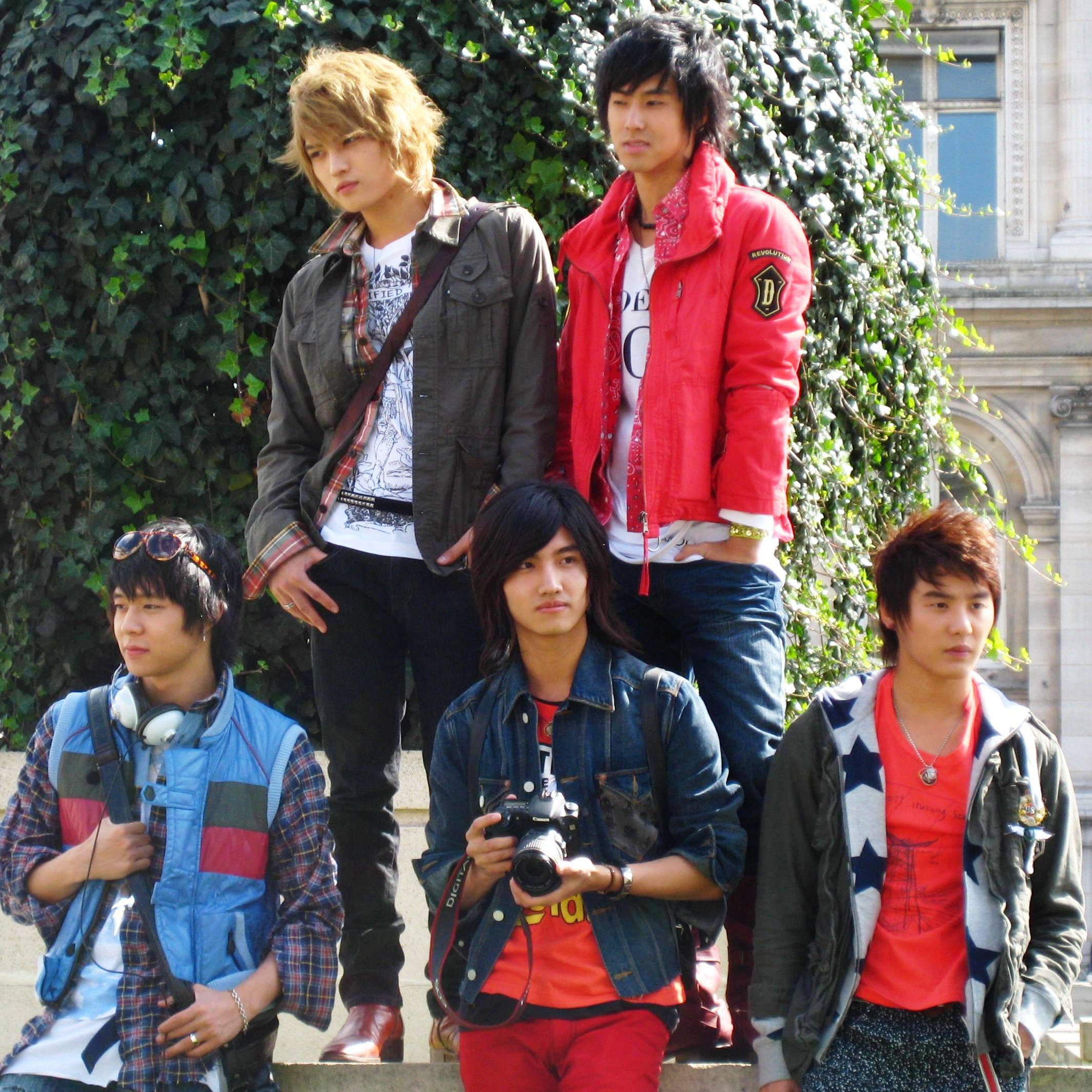
TVXQ (2005, 2008)

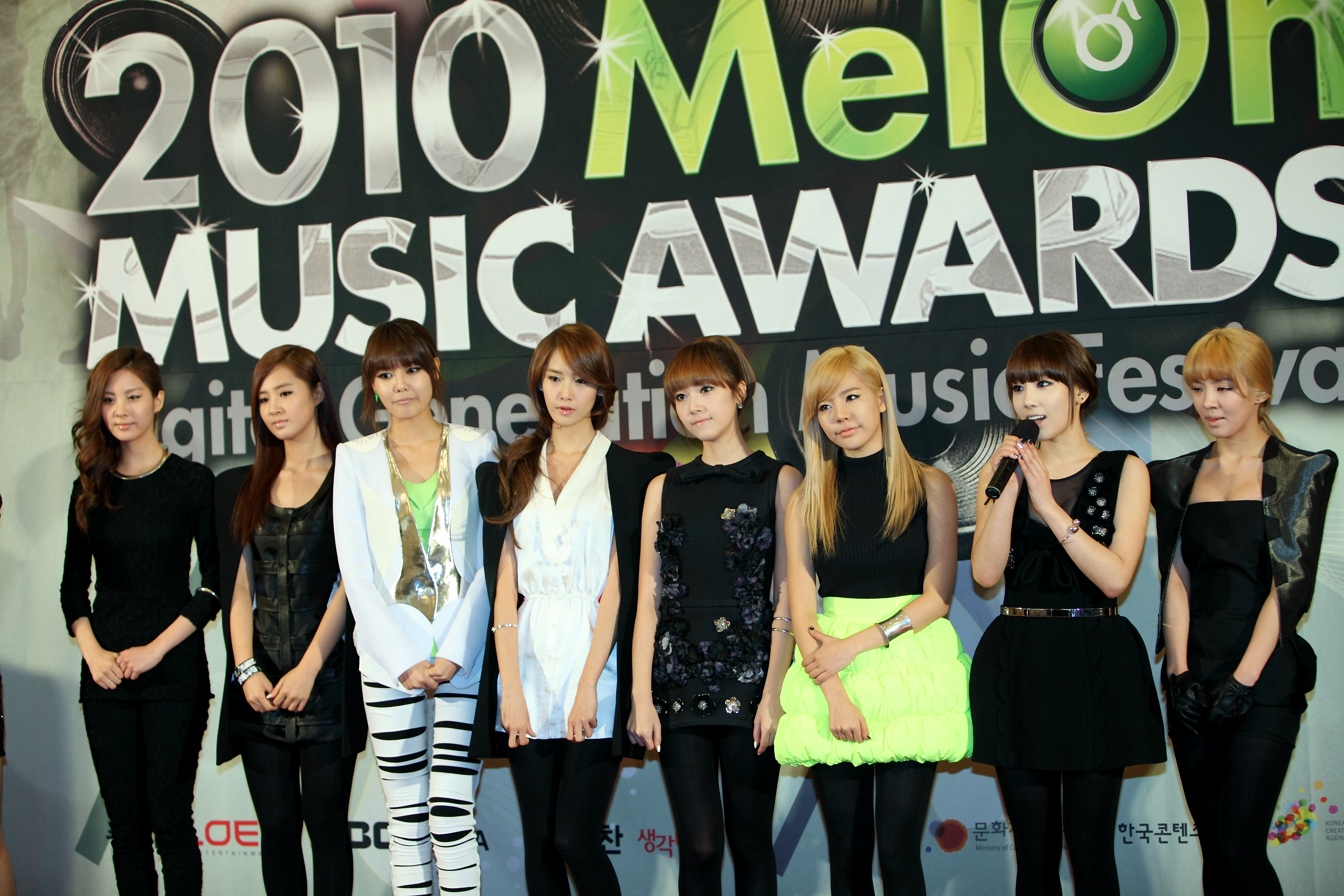
Girls' Generation (2009–10)

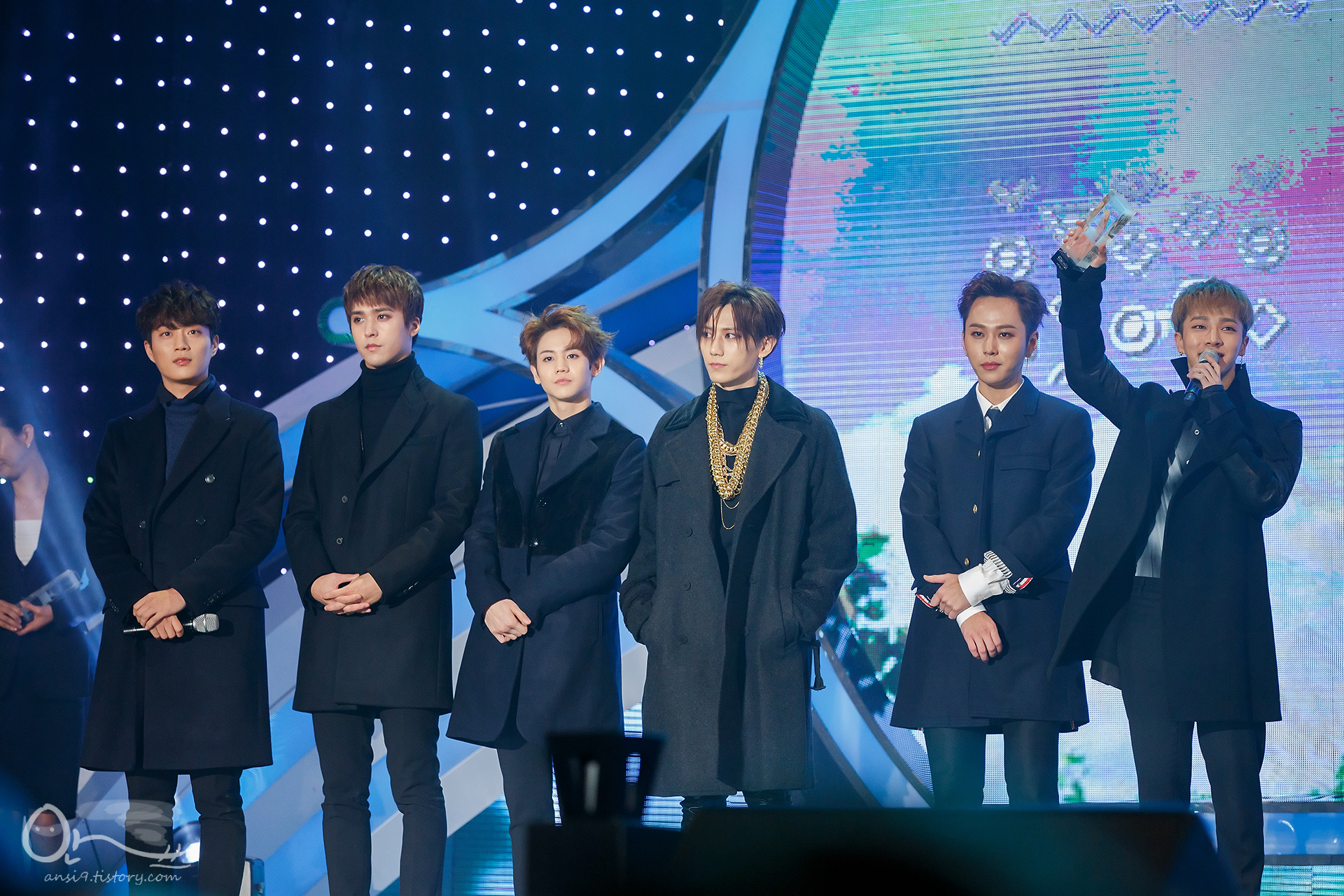
Beast (2011–12)

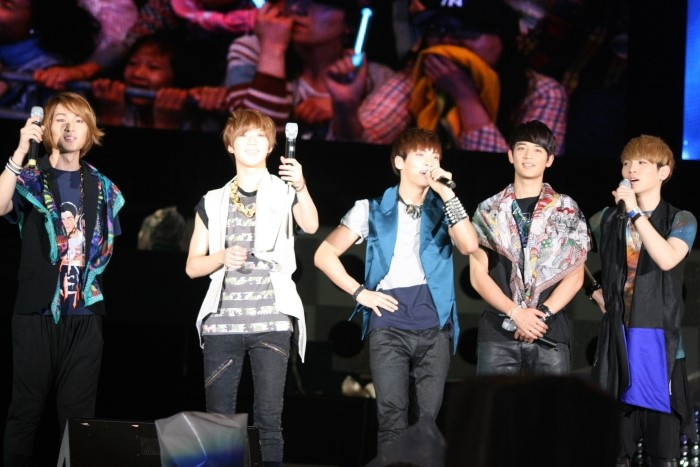
Shinee (2013)

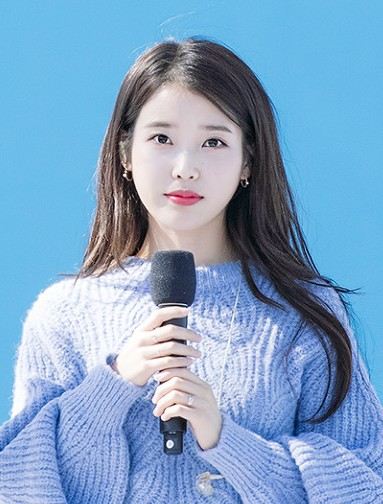
IU (2014, 2021)

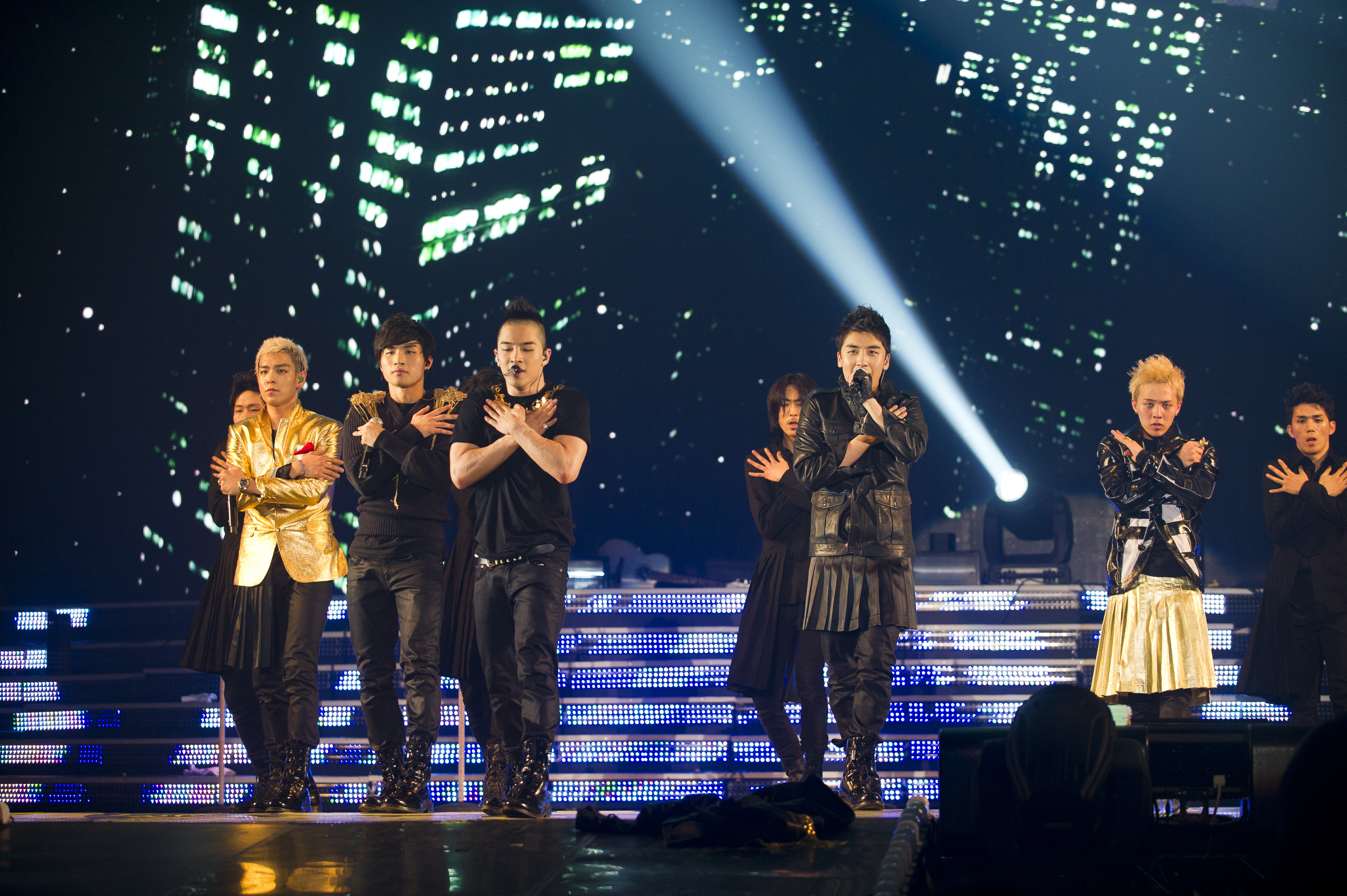
Big Bang (2015)

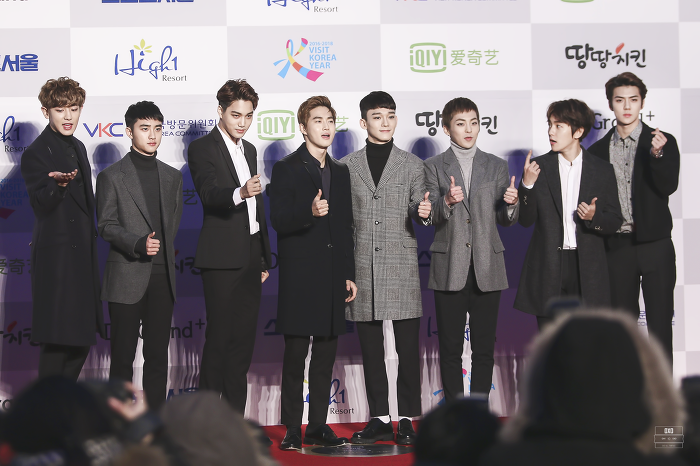
Exo (2016–17)

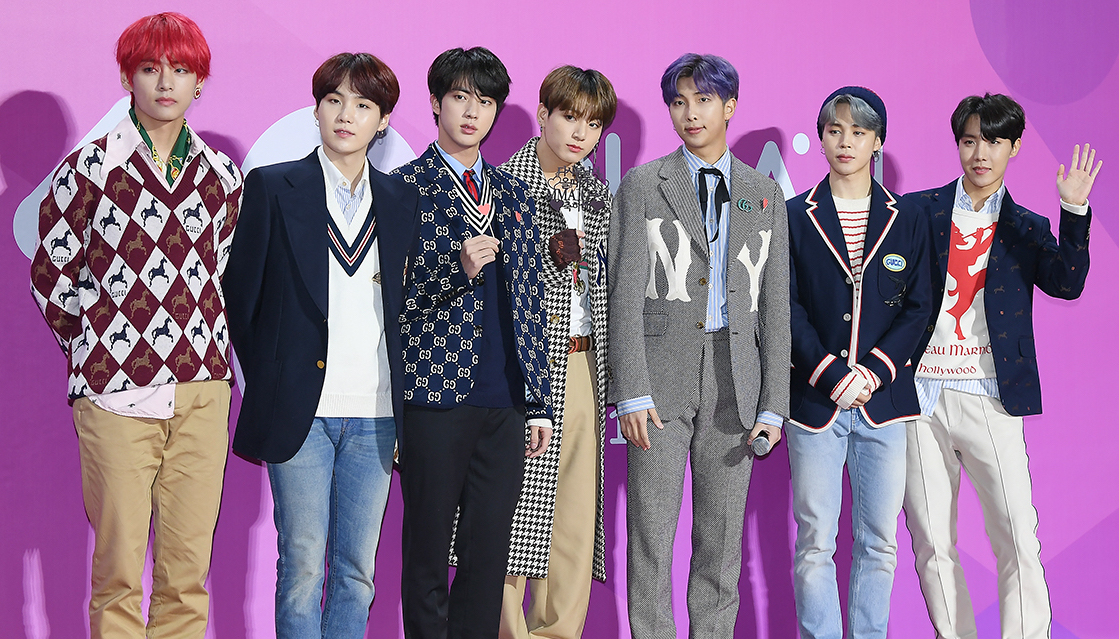
BTS (2018–20)

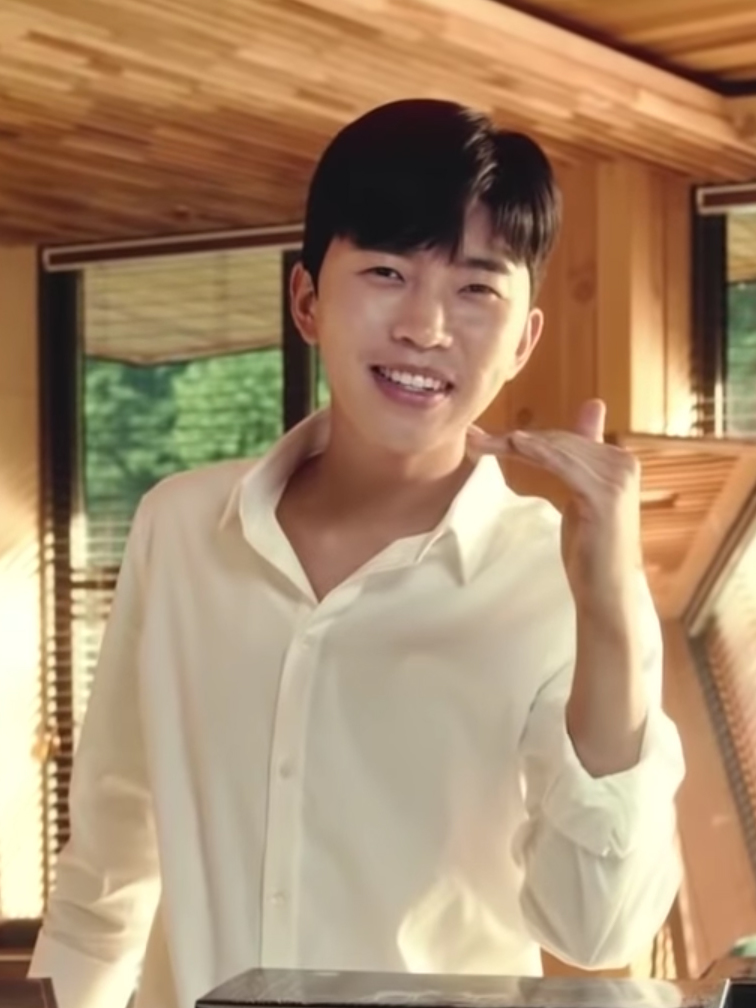
Lim Young-woong (2022)

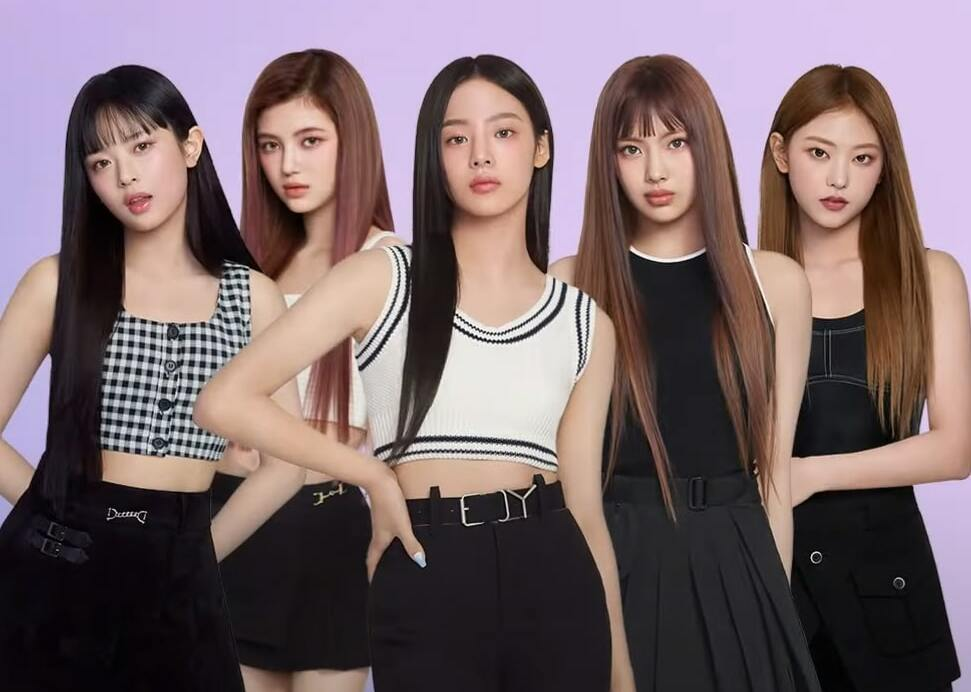
NewJeans (2023)

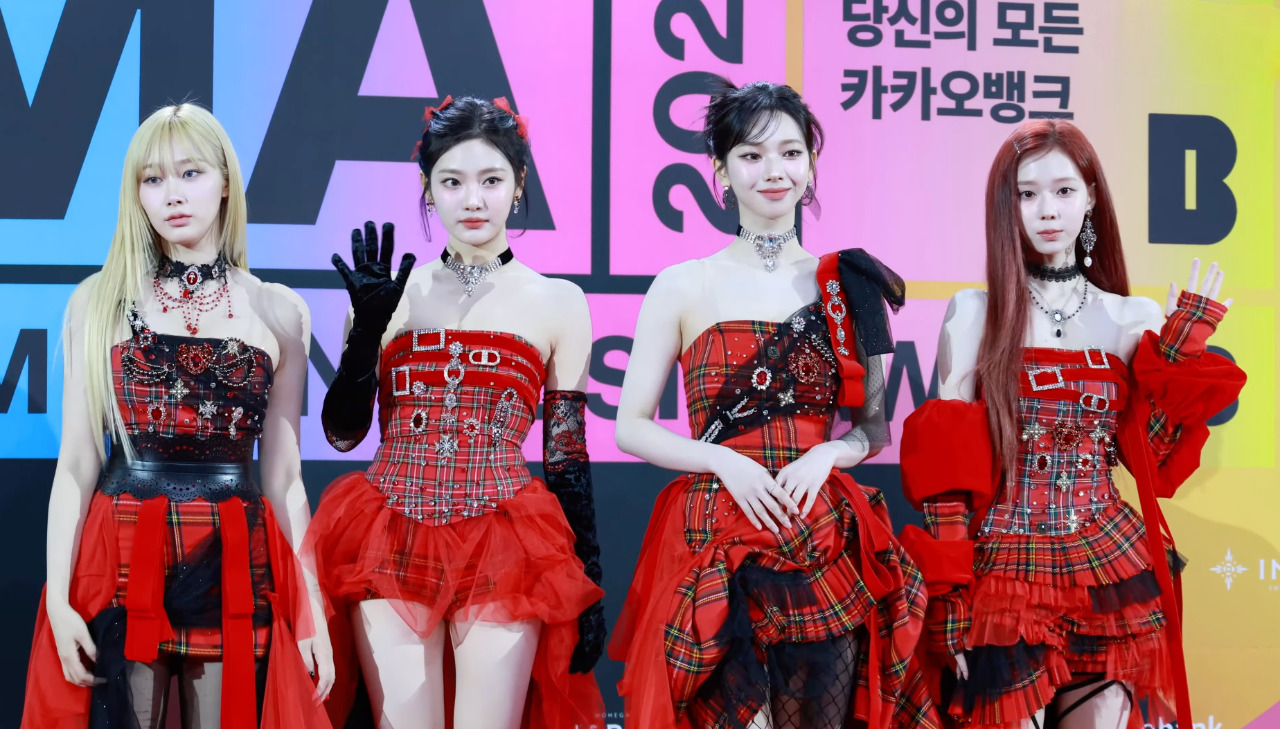
Aespa (2024)

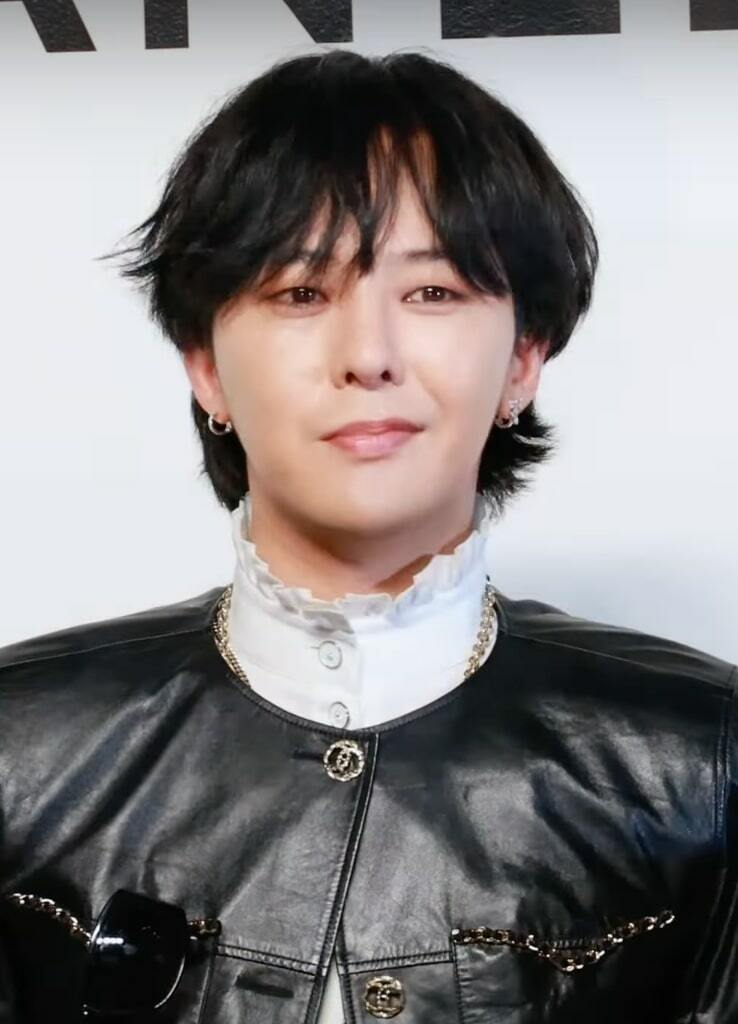
G-Dragon (2025)

Winners are listed first and highlighted in bold.

Year^{[I]}	Artists	Ref.
Online winners
2005	**TVXQ**	
2006	**Shinhwa**	
2007	**Shin Hye-sung**	
2008	**TVXQ**	
Artist of the Year (daesang)
2009	**Girls' Generation**	
2010	**Girls' Generation**	
2010	IU	
2010	2NE1	
2010	CNBLUE	
2010	2AM	
2011	**Beast**	
2011	2NE1	
2011	Leessang	
2011	Big Bang	
2011	IU	
2012	**Beast**	
2012	Busker Busker	
2012	Big Bang	
2012	Psy	
2012	IU	
2013	**Shinee**	
2013	Sistar	
2013	IU	
2013	Exo	
2013	G-Dragon	
2014	**IU**	
2014	g.o.d	
2014	Beast	
2014	AKMU	
2014	Taeyang	
2015	**Big Bang**	
2015	Shinee	
2015	Exo	
2015	Zion.T	
2015	Hyukoh	
2016	**Exo**	
2016	Twice	
2016	BTS	
2016	GFriend	
2016	Zico	
2017	**Exo**	
2017	IU	
2017	BTS	
2017	Bolbbalgan4	
2017	Heize	
2018	**BTS**	
2018	Exo	
2018	Wanna One	
2018	iKon	
2018	Twice	
2019	**BTS**	
2019	Chungha	
2019	Exo	
2019	Taeyeon	
2019	Jannabi	
2020	**BTS**	
2020	Baek Ye-rin	
2020	IU	
2020	Lim Young-woong	
2020	Zico	
2021	**IU**	
2021	Aespa	
2021	BTS	
2021	Lim Young-woong	
2021	NCT Dream	
2022	**Lim Young-woong**	
2022	BTS	
2022	Ive	
2022	(G)I-dle	
2022	MeloMance	
2023	**NewJeans**	
2023	Aespa	
2023	Ive	
2023	Le Sserafim	
2023	NCT Dream	
2024	**Aespa**	
2024	(G)I-dle	
2024	Day6	
2024	NewJeans	
2024	Plave	
2025	**G-Dragon**	
2025	Aespa	
2025	BoyNextDoor	
2025	Ive	
2025	Jennie	
2025	Lim Young-woong	
2025	NCT Wish	
2025	Plave	
2025	Riize	
2025	Rosé	
2026	**BTS**	
2026	AKMU	
2026	Cortis	
2026	Ive	
2026	Plave	

== Artists with multiple nominations ==
8 nominations

- IU
- BTS

6 nominations

- Exo

4 nominations

- Aespa
- Ive

3 nominations

- Beast
- Big Bang
- Lim Young-woong
- Plave

2 nominations

- TVXQ
- Girls' Generation
- 2NE1
- Shinee
- Zico
- NCT Dream
- NewJeans
- (G)I-dle
- AKMU

== Artists with multiple wins ==
4 wins

- BTS

2 wins

- IU
- Exo
- Beast
- Girls' Generation

== See also ==
- Mnet Asian Music Award for Artist of the Year
