= Melon Music Award for Album of the Year =

South Korean music award

- Awarded for: Top performing digital albums
- Country: South Korea
- Presented by: Kakao Entertainment
- First award: 2005 (online); 2009 (ceremony)
- Currently held by: BTS – Arirang (2026)

Highlights
- Most wins: BTS (5)
- Most nominations: IU (9)
- Website: Official website

The Melon Music Award for Album of the Year is an award presented by South Korean entertainment company Kakao Entertainment at the annual Melon Music Awards, with its inaugural online ceremony in 2005. Award winners are based on data collected from the Melon music platform and honors artists who have had exceptional performance during the recording year. Since 2009, it has comprised one of the daesang (grand prize) awards given at the event, alongside Song of the Year, Artist of the Year, and later Record of the Year—the latter of which was introduced during the 2018 ceremony.

From 2005 to 2008, award winners were announced online, although there was no album accolade given in 2007 or 2008. The ceremony was officially held offline in Seoul starting with the 2009 awards, with Album of the Year becoming one of the ceremony's grand prizes. The ceremony has been held at various venues throughout Seoul. As of 2021, the criteria for the Album of the Year accolade currently consist of a breakdown of 60% digital sales and streaming figures, 20% evaluation from a panel of judges, and 20% online voting.

BTS is the most awarded artist in the category, having won five times in 2016, 2018, 2019, 2020, and 2026. Other artists who have won the award more than once include 2NE1, Busker Busker and IU. IU is the most nominated artist in the category, having been nominated nine times.

== Winners and nominees ==
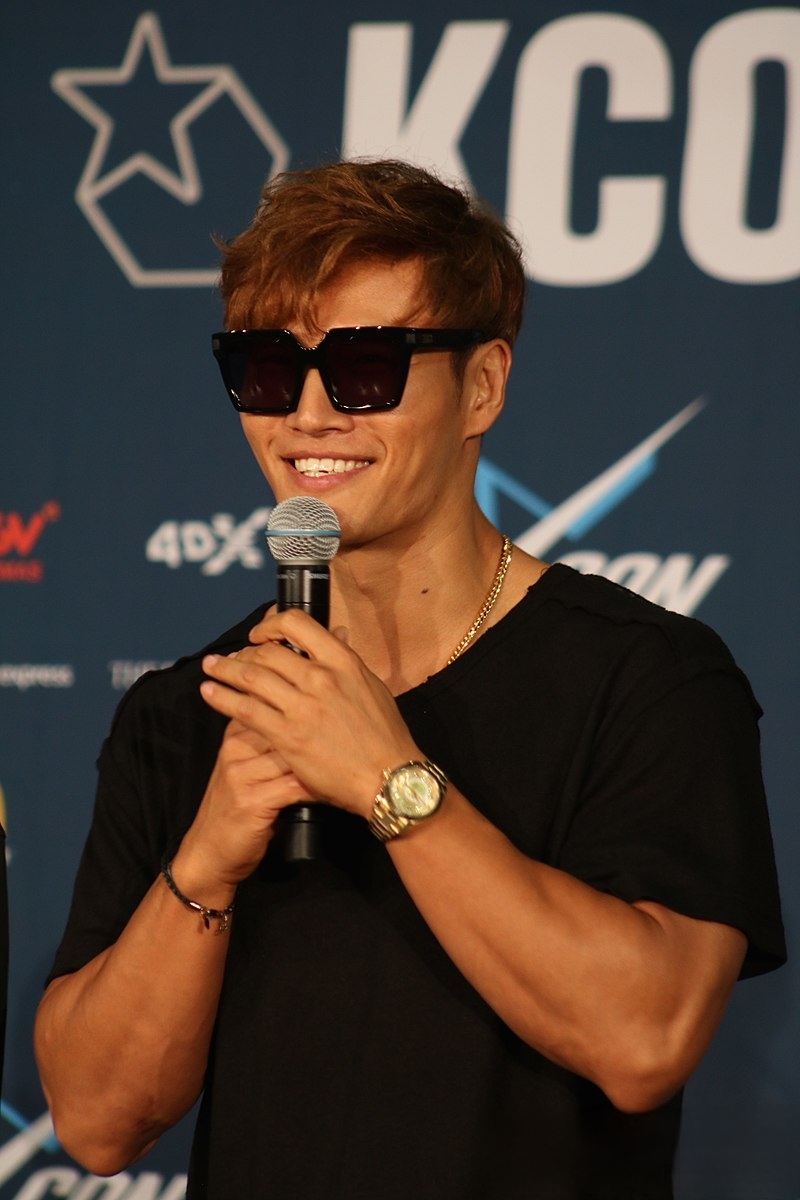
2006 recipient Kim Jong-kook

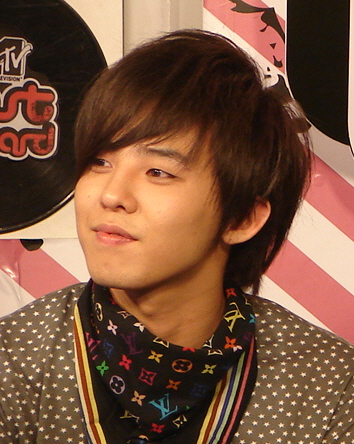
Two-time award recipient G-Dragon (2009,2025)

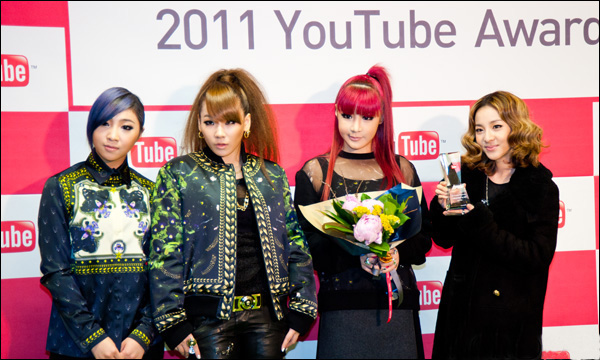
Two-time award winner 2NE1 (2010–11)

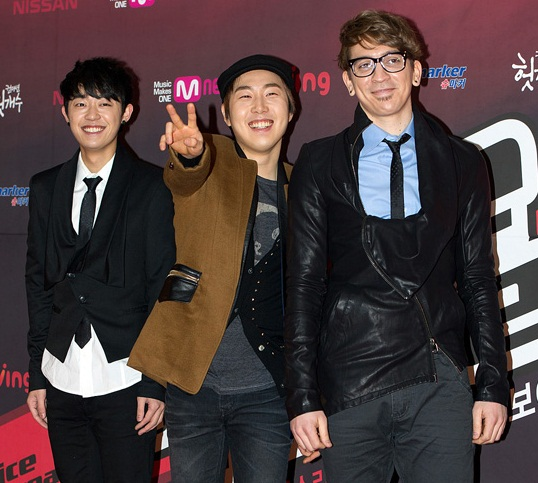
Two-time recipient Busker Busker (2012–13)

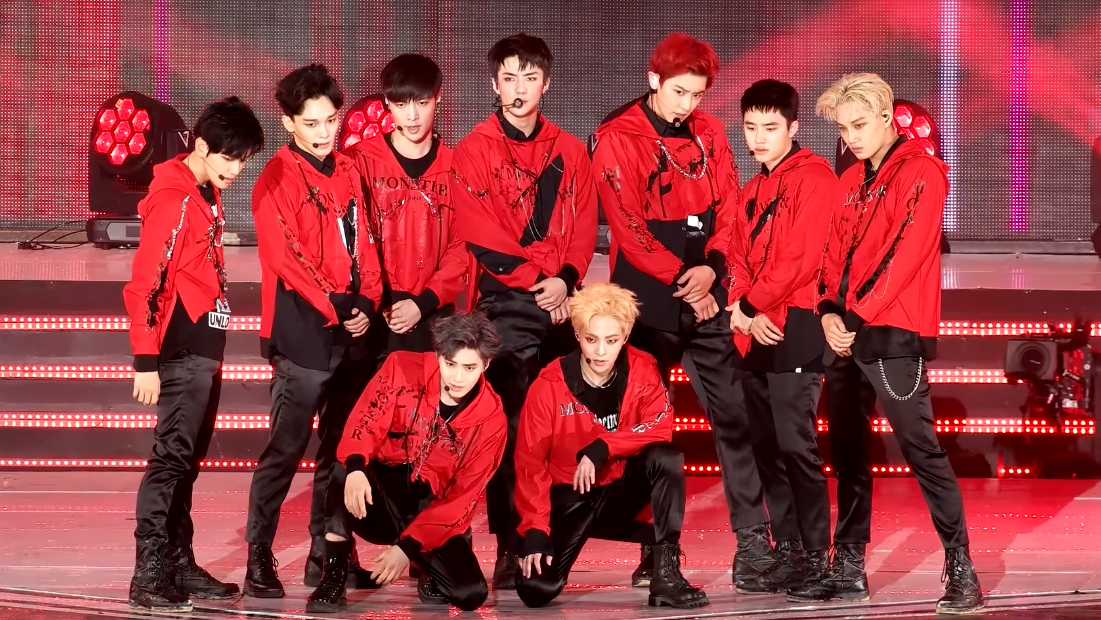
2015 recipient Exo

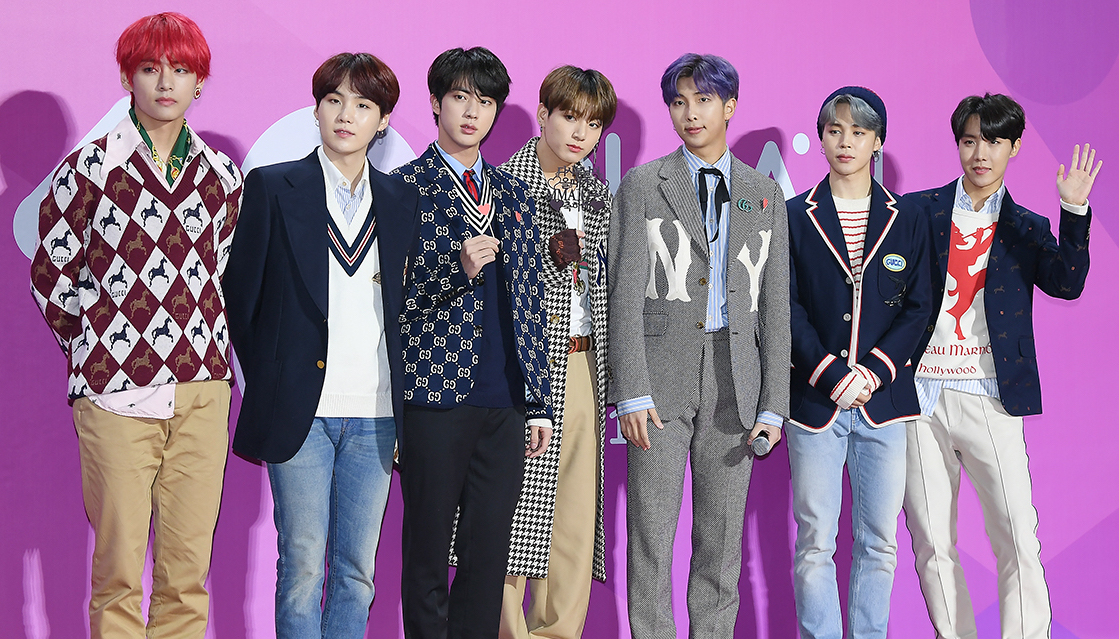
Four-time award winner BTS, winning in 2016 and 2018–20

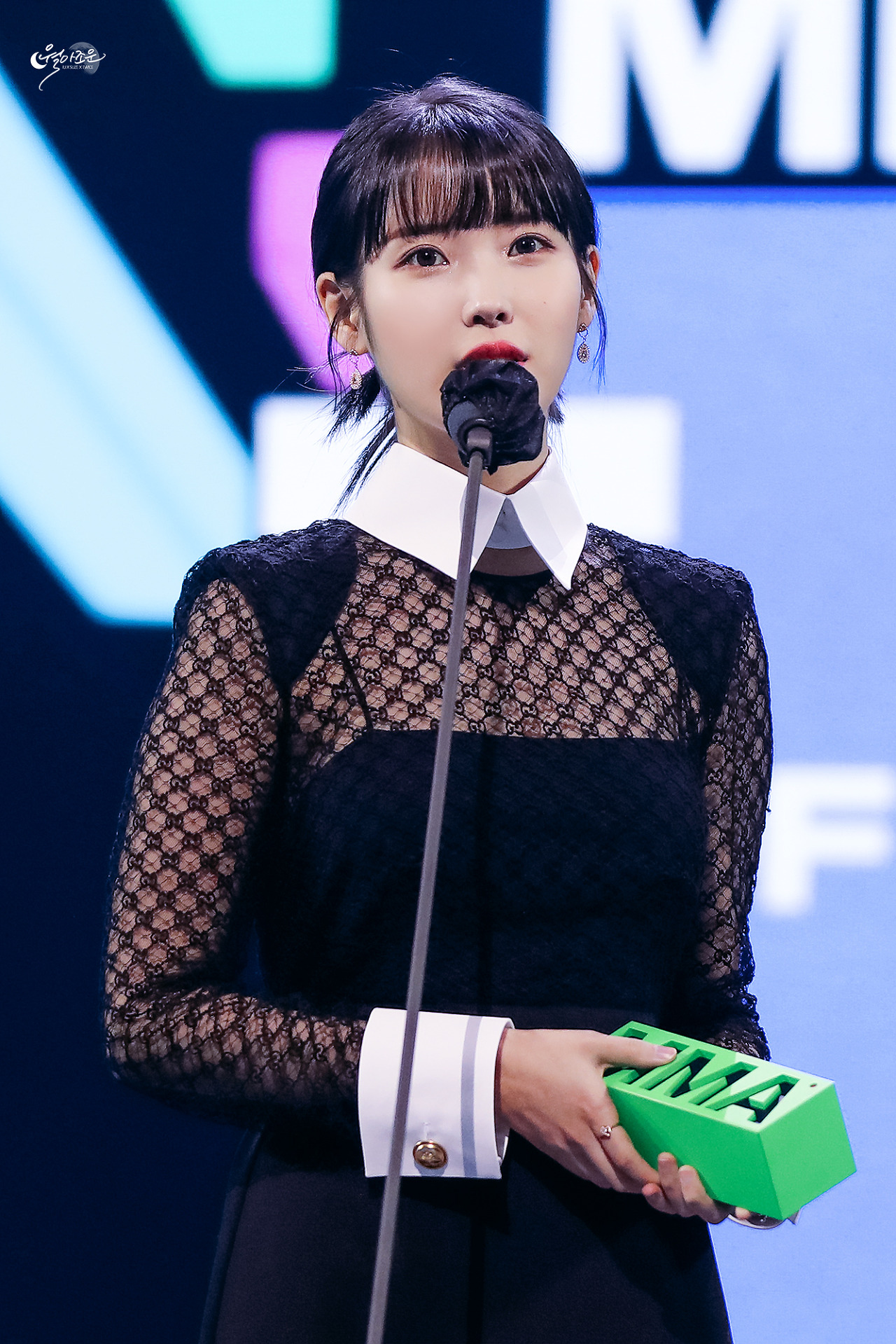
Two-time award winner IU (2017, 2021)

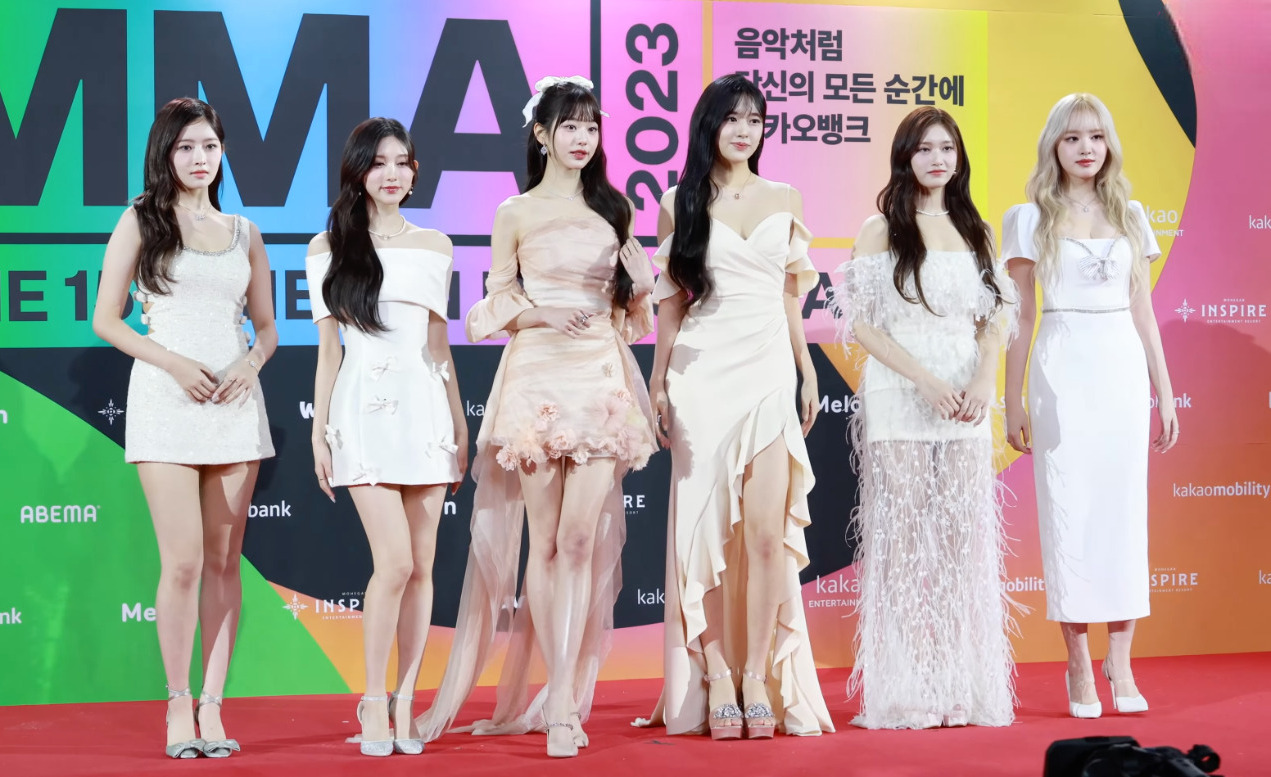
2023 award winner Ive

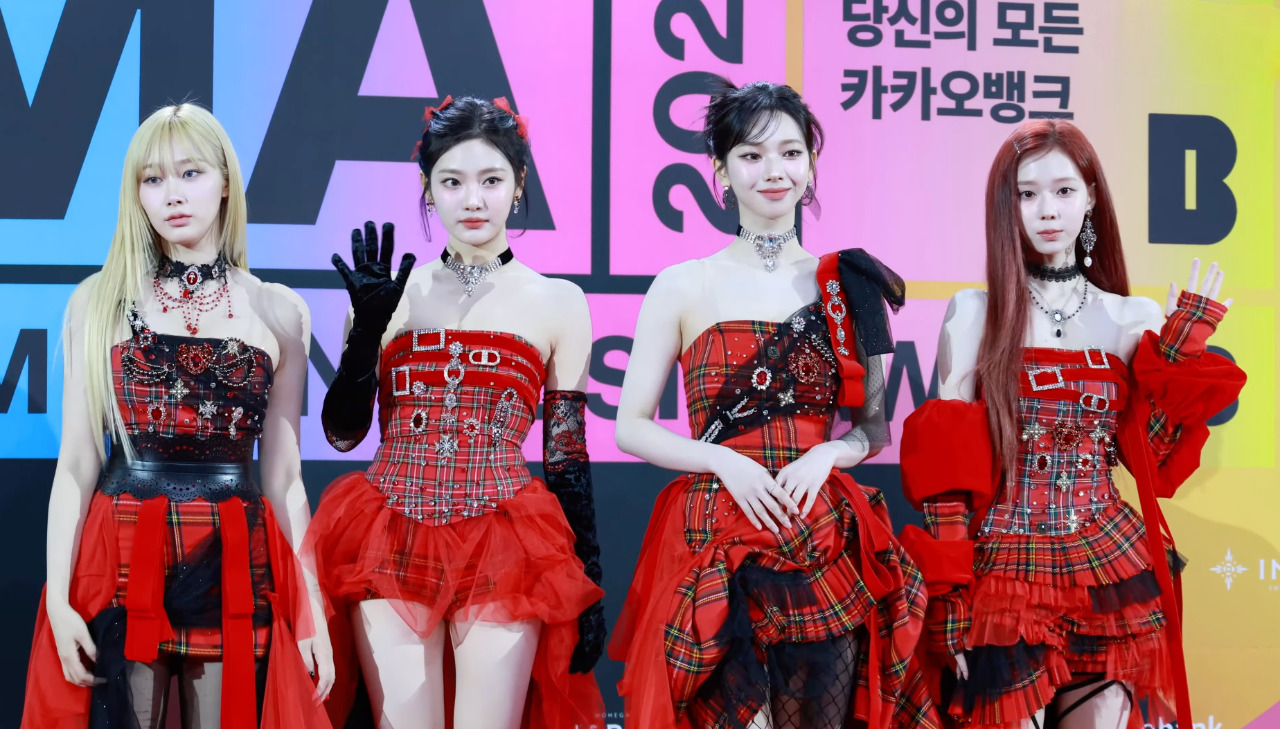
2024 award winner Aespa

From 2005 to 2008, the Melon Music Award winners were announced online and were based entirely on online voting. In 2007 and 2008, there was no album accolade announced by the event committee.

List of online award winners (2005–2008)
Year	Winner(s)	Album	Ref.
2005	SG Wannabe	Saldaga	
2006	Kim Jong-kook	Fourth Letter	
2007	No award given		
2008	No award given		

The Melon Music Awards were held in a traditional live format for the first time since 2009, with Album of the Year consisting of one the three daesang prizes, alongside Artist of the Year and Song of the Year. Because of this, the 2009 event is regarded as the first "official" ceremony in the show's history.

List of daesang award winners and nominees (2009–present)
Year	Winner(s)	Album	Nominees (Note: Shortlisted nominees are listed—except for 2009, where no shortlist was announced.)	Ref.
2009	G-Dragon	Heartbreaker	2NE1 – 2NE1 1st Mini Album; 2PM – 2:00PM Time for Change; Brown Eyed Girls – Sound-G; Davichi – Davichi in Wonderland; Girls' Generation – Gee; Kara – Revolution; MC Mong – Humanimal; Outsider – Maestro; SG Wannabe – Gift from SG Wannabe	
2010	2NE1	To Anyone	Girls' Generation – Oh!; 2AM – Can't Let You Go Even If I Die; DJ DOC – Pungnyu; 4Men – The 3rd Generation	
2011	2NE1	2NE1 2nd Mini Album	Leessang – Asura Balbalta; Beast – Fiction and Fact; Big Bang – Tonight; IU – Real	
2012	Busker Busker	Busker Busker 1st Album	IU – Last Fantasy; Big Bang – Alive; G-Dragon – One of a Kind; Psy – Psy 6 (Six Rules), Part 1	
2013	Busker Busker	Busker Busker 2nd Album	Shinee – The Misconceptions of Us; IU – Modern Times; Exo – XOXO; G-Dragon – Coup d'Etat	
2014	g.o.d	Chapter 8	2NE1 – Crush; IU – A Flower Bookmark; AKMU – Play; Taeyang – Rise	
2015	Exo	Exodus	Big Bang – M; Shinee – Odd; Toy – Da Capo; Hyukoh – 22	
2016	BTS	The Most Beautiful Moment in Life: Young Forever	Exo – Ex'Act; Psy – Chiljip Psy-da; AKMU – Spring; Jang Beom-june – Jang Beom June 2 Album	
2017	IU	Palette	Exo – The War; BTS – You Never Walk Alone; Psy – 4X2=8; Big Bang – Made	
2018	BTS	Love Yourself: Tear	Blackpink – Square Up; iKon – Return; Wanna One – 0+1=1 (I Promise You); Bolbbalgan4 – Red Diary Page.2	
2019	BTS	Map of the Soul: Persona	Bolbbalgan4 – Puberty Book I Bom; Jang Beom-june – Jang Beom June 3; Jannabi – Legend; MC the Max – Circular	
2020	BTS	Map of the Soul: 7	Iz*One – Bloom*Iz; Baek Ye-rin – Every Letter I Sent You; Bolbbalgan4 – Youth Diary II; Oh My Girl – Nonstop	
2021	IU	Lilac	AKMU – Next Episode; NCT Dream – Hot Sauce; BTS – Be; Heize – Happen	
2022	Lim Young-woong	Im Hero	Psy – Psy 9th; IU – Pieces; (G)I-dle – I Never Die; NewJeans – New Jeans	
2023	Ive	I've Ive	(G)I-dle – I Feel; Aespa – My World; Le Sserafim – Unforgiven; NewJeans – Get Up	
2024	Aespa	Armageddon	(G)I-dle – 2; Day6 – Fourever; IU – The Winning; Plave – Asterum: 134-1	
2025	G-Dragon	Übermensch	Babymonster – Drip; IU – A Flower Bookmark 3; Ive – Ive Empathy; Jennie – Ruby; Lim Young-woong – Im Hero 2; Plave – Caligo Pt. 1; Riize – Odyssey; Rosé – Rosie; Seventeen – Happy Burstday	
2026	BTS	Arirang	AKMU – Flowering; Aespa – Lemonade; Cortis – GreenGreen; Ive – Revive+	

== Records ==
=== Most nominations ===
Most award nominations
Number	Artist (Note: Order is listed by most recent occurrence)
9	IU
7	BTS
4	2NE1
4	Big Bang
4	Exo
4	AKMU
3	Bolbbalgan4
3	Psy
3	(G)I-dle
3	Aespa
3	Ive
2	SG Wannabe
2	Girls' Generation
2	G-Dragon
2	Shinee
2	Jang Beom-june
2	NewJeans

=== Most awards ===
Most award winners
Number	Artist
5	BTS
2	IU
2	Busker Busker
2	2NE1
2	G-Dragon

== See also ==
- Mnet Asian Music Award for Album of the Year
