= APAN Music Awards =

South Korean award ceremony

- Awarded for: Excellence in K-pop
- Venue: Kyung Hee University Peace Hall
- Country: South Korea
- Presented by: Korea Entertainment Management Association
- First award: January 24, 2021; 5 years ago

Highlights
- Most wins: Kang Daniel (5)
- Most nominations: BTS (6)
- Website: apanstarawards.com

Television/radio coverage
- Network: Olleh TV; Seezn

The APAN Music Awards is a South Korean music awards ceremony organized by the Korea Entertainment Management Association (KEMA), the same body responsible for the APAN Star Awards. It was created to honor the top K-pop artists of the year across various music categories as part of a two-day integrated event collectively referred to as the APAN MusicStar Awards.

Originally set to take place on November 28, 2020, at the Grand Peace Hall in Kyung Hee University and be broadcast exclusively on online platforms Olleh TV and Seezn, the inaugural ceremony was indefinitely postponed on November 18, 2020, after the Level 1.5 social distancing rules went into effect amid a resurgence of the COVID-19 pandemic in Seoul and surrounding metropolitan areas. Winners in limited categories were revealed online instead.

On December 17, 2020, the ceremony's rescheduled date was announced as January 23, 2021. On January 15, this was replaced officially to January 24.

== Winners and nominees ==
Nominees in various popularity categories were announced on October 26. Voting began on October 27 via the Idol Champ mobile app and continued until November 27. Voting for the KT Seezn Star category took place on the Seezn app.

Nominees for the Bonsang (Main Prize) category were announced on November 6, 2020, while the selection of its winners were based on the combination of album sales, digital sales, evaluations from a judges panel, and fan votes.

The APAN Top 10 (Bonsang), Best Icon, Best Performance, Best Music Video, and Best All-rounder winners were announced on November 26, while the rest of the winners were announced on November 30 and January 15, 2021.

During the ceremony on January 24, 2021, they delivered new categories; Represent Song of the Year, Represent Artist of the Year, Represent Record of the Year, New Wave Award and Best K-Trot.

=== Main awards ===
| No. 1 Achievement (Daesang) | Represent Song of the Year |
|---|---|
| BTS | Monsta X |
| Represent Artist of the Year | Represent Record of the Year |
| NCT 127 | Twice |
APAN Top 10 (Bonsang)
BTS; Got7; Iz*One; Kang Daniel; Lim Young-woong; Monsta X; NCT 127; Seventeen; The Boyz; Twice
| New Wave Award | Best K-Trot |
| Treasure, Hynn | Jang Min-ho |

=== APAN Choice Awards ===
| APAN Choice Best Vocalist | APAN Choice New Focus |
|---|---|
| Kim Jae Hwan | LEENALCHI |
| APAN Choice Global Hallyu Star | APAN Choice Best Trend |
| A.C.E | Ha Sung-woon |
APAN Choice New K-Pop Icon
WEi

=== Popularity Awards ===
Winners that were determined solely through a popularity vote for Idol Champ app and KT Seezn app.

Best Music Video
Blackpink
| Best Icon | Best Performance |
| NCT U | Kang Daniel |
| Best All-rounder | KT Seezn Star Award – Singer |
| JB (Got7) | Kang Daniel |
| Idol Champ Entertainer – Man | Idol Champ Entertainer – Woman |
| Park Ji-hoon | Chuu (Loona) |
| Idol Champ Fan's Pick – Group | Idol Champ Global Pick – Group |
| BTS; Iz*One | Seventeen; Blackpink |
| Idol Champ Fan's Pick – Solo | Idol Champ Global Pick – Solo |
| Kang Daniel; IU | Kang Daniel; Hwasa |

== See also ==
- APAN Star Awards
- 7th APAN Star Awards
