= Trust in Me (Lim Young-woong song) =

2020 single by Lim Young-woong

Single by Lim Young-woong

from the album Mr. Trot
- Language: Korean
- Released: April 3, 2020 (Original version); June 22, 2020 (Piano version)
- Recorded: 2020
- Genre: K-pop; trot
- Length: 4:02 (Original version); 4:01 (Piano version)
- Label: TV Chosun; Tizzo C&C; New Era Project; Kakao M
- Composer: Cho Young-soo
- Lyricist: Kim Eana

Lim Young-woong singles chronology
"Not by Stairs, but by Elevator" (2018)	"Trust in Me" (2020)	"Hero" (2020)

Audio video
- "Trust in Me" on YouTube "Trust in Me" (Piano version) on YouTube

Music video
- "Trust in Me" (Piano version) on YouTube

"Trust in Me" (Korean: 이제 나만 믿어요; RR: Ije naman mideoyo; lit. 'Now Only Believe Me') is a song recorded by South Korean trot singer Lim Young-woong. It was released for digital download and streaming as a single on April 3, 2020, through TV Chosun under license to Kakao M. Written by Kim Eana and composed by Cho Young-soo, the track was produced as a special song for Lim, who became the final winner of the reality television show Mr. Trot. Lyrically, the ballad trot song depicts a person's heartfelt gratitude towards his or her beloved people. A piano version of the song was also released as a single on June 22 of the same year, with its accompanying music video simultaneously uploaded onto Kakao M's official YouTube channel.

"Trust in Me" attained commercial success, peaking at number 11 on the Gaon Digital Chart and becoming the singer's first top-20 single in South Korea. Additionally, the song won a Melon Music Award for Best Trot and a Genie Music Award for Best Trot Track. In Gallup Korea's annual year-end survey for 2020, it was ranked as one of the 10 most favorite songs by both people aged 13–39 (no. 6) and people aged 40 and over (no. 2).

== Background and release ==
"Trust in Me" is a special song produced for Lim, the final winner of the music competition show Mr. Trot. It was written by lyricist Kim Eana and composer Cho Young-soo; they had previously worked together on Yoo San-seul's song "Redevelopment of Love" (사랑의 재개발; Sarangui jaegaebal). As a combination of standard pop ballad and trot, the track expresses a person's heartfelt gratitude towards his or her beloved people, with the singer's sincere voice and delicate emotion. Kim elaborated the background behind writing the lyrics, on her Instagram account:

"[...] I wrote the lyrics, wishing this song would be loved by all generations, just like children and adults sang along Noh Sa-yeon's song "Encounter" when I was a child. The plot and character were inspired entirely by Lim's brief words. There was an echo from stories that the winner was announced on the anniversary of his father's passing and he gave all the prize money to his mother. [...] I guessed he might want to say such words to his mother, and his fans who have continued supporting him from the start."

The song was premiered during the second episode of TV Chosun's The Taste of Mr. Trot which aired on March 26, 2020. It was then released as a single on April 3 at noon KST.

=== "Trust in Me" (Piano by Cho Young-soo) ===
A waltz-esque piano version of "Trust in Me", arranged by Cho who composed the original track, was surprisingly released as a single on June 22 the same year. According to New Era Project, the singer's management label, this version was recorded as a gift to his fans, with his thankful heart for their love and support. Prior to its release, a snippet of the song was featured in a commercial for Maeil Dairies' coffee brand "Barista Rules". (Note: At that time, Lim worked as a spokesmodel for the coffee brand.)

An accompanying music video for the song was filmed by Maeil Dairies, as a birthday gift for Lim who had never released any official music videos since his debut. The clip was uploaded onto Kakao M's official YouTube channel on the same day of the single's release. The video begins with a scene depicting Lim entering an old building, dressed in black. Throughout the clip, he sings the song while playing a black piano placed in the center of the building. As of March 31, 2021, the music video has surpassed four million combined views on YouTube.

== Commercial performance ==
"Trust in Me" entered the top 10 of the major real-time music charts in South Korea upon release, including Melon, Genie, Bugs and Naver Vibe. This success was reported to be very exceptional for a song released by a trot singer. The song later topped the real-time music charts on Genie, Bugs, Naver Vibe and Soribada.

The single debuted at number 20 on South Korea's Gaon Digital Chart for the issue dated March 29 – April 4, 2020. It became Lim's first top-20 entry on the chart, with its first two days of availability. The song rose to number 16 the following week, fueled by its chart-topping downloads and soaring streams during its second week of release. Almost nine months later, it peaked at number 11. As of April 8, 2021, "Trust in Me" has spent 53 consecutive weeks in the top 100. In addition, the song topped the component Download Chart for four weeks in total, giving the singer his first chart-topper there, while peaking at number 34 on the component Streaming Chart. Meanwhile, the piano version peaked at number 181 on the Gaon Digital Chart for the issue dated March 14–20, 2021.

According to the Gaon Music Chart, "Trust in Me" was the 50th best-performing song, the fourth most-downloaded song and the 59th most-streamed song of the year 2020 in South Korea.

"Trust in Me" also proved to be successful in a music program record chart, reaching the top five of SBS' Inkigayo Chart even almost one year after its release.

The song now holds the record for the Most Streamed Song on Melon (1.06B streams) and Genie (368.97M streams)

== Live performances ==
After the release of "Trust in Me", Lim promoted the song on various music programs including MBC's Show! Music Core, MBC M's Show Champion and SBS' Inkigayo, from April 4 until 12, 2020. On June 6, he performed the song at the Haeinsa Memorial Music Concert, which was held in commemoration of the 70th anniversary of the Korean War. This concert was televised on TV Chosun later that month. The singer then performed this song also at the 12th MTN Broadcast Advertising Festival on July 15, in celebration of the event. He even sang the song as a duet with singer Lee Hae-ri during the 18th episode of TV Chosun's Romantic Call Centre which aired on July 30 the same year.

The song's first performance at a music awards show was made at the 2020 Trot Awards, where the singer won six trophies including Best New Artist and Popularity Award. He then performed "Trust in Me" at the 12th Annual Melon Music Awards, alongside the promotional single "Hero". Under the segment title "Hero: The Origin of Love", his performance contained the message; "What I sing is the beginning of everything for those who love me." This live performance introduced EX-3D stereophonic sound technology. (Note: This technology enables listeners to feel a sense of dimension just like performers sing songs right next to them, when using earphones or headphones without any special devices.) These two songs were presented together at the 35th Golden Disc Awards as well.

== Cover versions ==
- South Korean singer Crush covered "Trust in Me" during the 32nd episode of Romantic Call Centre which aired on November 12, 2020.
- On January 13, 2021, actor Seol Jung-hwan covered the song on KBS Cool FM's radio show Good Day to Love, This Is Lee Geum-hee.
- Actress Park Hae-mi and her son Hwang Sung-jae reinterpreted the song in a musical-theatre style, on KBS2's Immortal Songs: Singing the Legend which aired on February 13, 2021.
- Singer Kim Jong-kook covered the song as a duet with Lim during the 41st episode of TV Chosun's Ppongsoongah School which aired on March 3, 2021.
- Vocalist group NeighBro covered the song on the 535th episode of KBS2's You Hee-yeol's Sketchbook which aired on April 2, 2021.

== Track listings and formats ==
- Digital download and streaming (Original version)
1. "Trust in Me" – 4:02
2. "Trust in Me" (Instrumental) – 4:02

- Digital download and streaming (Piano version)
1. "Trust in Me (Piano by Cho Young-soo)" – 4:01
2. "Trust in Me (Piano by Cho Young-soo)" (Instrumental) – 4:01

== Credits and personnel ==
Credits and personnel are adapted from Melon.

- Lim Young-woong – vocals (Both versions)
- Kim Eana – lyricist (Both versions)
- Cho Young-soo – composer (Both versions), arranger (Piano version only)
- Lee Yoo-jin – arranger (Original version only)

== Charts ==
=== Weekly charts ===
Weekly chart performance for "Trust in Me"
Chart (2021)	Peak position
South Korea (Gaon)	11
South Korea (Gaon) Piano version	181

=== Monthly charts ===
Monthly chart performance for "Trust in Me"
Chart (2020)	Position
South Korea (Gaon)	18

=== Year-end charts ===
2020 year-end chart performance for "Trust in Me"
Chart (2020)	Position
South Korea (Gaon)	50

2021 year-end chart performance for "Trust in Me"
Chart (2021)	Position
South Korea (Gaon)	35

2022 year-end chart performance for "Trust in Me"
Chart (2022)	Position
South Korea (Circle)	51

2023 year-end chart performance for "Trust in Me"
Chart (2023)	Position
South Korea (Circle)	75

2024 year-end chart performance for "Trust in Me"
Chart (2024)	Position
South Korea (Circle)	90

== Accolades ==
=== Annual survey ===
Year	Organization	List	Rank	Ref.
2020	Gallup Korea	10 Most Favorite Songs (People Aged 13–39)	6	
2020	Gallup Korea	10 Most Favorite Songs (People Aged 40 and Over)	2	

=== Awards and nominations ===
Year	Award	Category	Result	Ref.
2020	12th Melon Music Awards	Best Trot Award	Won	
2020	3rd Genie Music Awards	Best Trot Track	Won	
2020	2020 Mubeat Awards	Song of the Year	Won	
2021	35th Golden Disc Awards	Digital Bonsang (Main Prize)	Nominated	

== Release history ==
Region	Date	Format(s)	Version	Label	Ref.
Various	April 3, 2020	Digital download; streaming	Original	TV Chosun; Kakao M	
Various	June 22, 2020	Digital download; streaming	Piano	Tizzo C&C; New Era Project; Kakao M	
