= Im Hero =

- Digital cover

Studio album by Lim Young-woong
- Released: May 2, 2022
- Genres: K-pop
- Length: 43:48
- Language: Korean
- Label: Mulgogi Music

Lim Young-woong chronology
Newness of Trot (2020)	Im Hero (2022)	Im Hero 2 (2025)

Singles from Im Hero
- 1. "Our Blues, Our Life" Released: April 17, 2022; 2. "If We Ever Meet Again" Released: May 2, 2022

Im Hero is the debut studio album by South Korean singer Lim Young-woong, released on May 2, 2022, through Mulgogi Music and distributed by Dreamus. It was preceded by the single "Our Blues, Our Life", which topped the Gaon Digital Chart on release, and accompanied by the second single "If We Ever Meet Again", which also debuted atop the Gaon Digital Chart.

The album was released in four physical versions and debuted atop the Gaon Album Chart upon release. According to Gaon, Im Hero sold over 772,000 copies in South Korea in its first week of retail availability. It won Album of the Year at the 2022 Melon Music Awards.

== Background ==
Im Hero, Lim's first album, comes six years after his debut. He stated that he "did [his] best to put in a wide variety of songs" and "really wanted to get it right. Just when I thought I'd completed it, something would make me think it's not enough, and I'd go back to the beginning on several occasions."

== Commercial performance ==
The album became available for pre-order on April 7, 2022, and its jewel case version sold out quickly. The album debuted atop the Gaon Album Chart and sold over 772,000 copies at retail stores in South Korea in its first week of availability, according to Gaon. According to Hanteo, Lim broke the record for first-day CD sales by a solo singer, selling 940,600 copies on its first day and over 1.1 million in total in its first week.

== Accolades ==
Awards and nominations
Organization	Year	Category	Result	Ref.
Genie Music Awards	2022	Album of the Year	Nominated	
Melon Music Awards	2022	Album of the Year	Won	

== Track listing ==
Im Hero track listing
No.	Title	Lyrics	Music	Arrangement	Length
1.	"If We Ever Meet Again" (다시 만날 수 있을까)	Lee Juck	Lee J.	Yang Si-on	4:34
2.	"Rainbow" (무지개)	Kim Si-on; Maddoaeji	Maddoaeji; Kim S.	Kim S.; Maddoaeji; Chung Soo-wan	3:16
3.	"Lovely Touch" (손이 참 곱던 그대)	Foresko; Kim Hyun-woo; Glody; Myung Seung-won	Kim H.; Foresko; Glody; Myung	Foresko; Kim H.; Glody; Myung	3:15
4.	"Our Blues, Our Life" (우리들의 블루스)	Ji Hoon	Lee Seung-ju; Choi In-hwan	Lee S.; Choi	3:27
5.	"Father" (아버지)	Woo Ji-min	Woo Ji-min	Jang Jae-won	3:58
6.	"A bientot"	Gong	Gong	Gong	4:16
7.	"Love Station" (사랑역)	Park Jeong-ran	Park Yong-jin	Park Y.	3:11
8.	"Nest" (보금자리)	Park Jin-bok	Park Sang-cheol	Lee Chang-woo (Fly Cat)	2:52
9.	"I Love You" (사랑해 진짜)	Jisoo Park (153/Joombas)	J. Park	J. Park	3:59
10.	"Love Letter" (연애편지)	Son Bong-ju (Jantapung)	Son	Park Yong-joon	3:35
11.	"Loving You" (사랑해요 그대를)	Sul Woon-do	Sul	Song Ga-young	3:32
12.	"A Psalm of Life" (인생찬가)	Yoon Myung-sun	Yoon; Haegu	Haegu; Lim Mi-ran	3:53
Total length:					43:59

== Charts ==
=== Weekly charts ===
Chart performance for Im Hero
Chart (2022)	Peak position
South Korean Albums (Gaon)	1

=== Monthly charts ===
Monthly chart performance for Im Hero
Chart (2022)	Peak position
South Korean Albums (Gaon)	3

=== Year-end charts ===
Year-end chart performance for Im Hero
Chart (2022)	Position
South Korean Albums (Circle)	15
