= Lim Young-woong =

South Korean singer (born 1991)

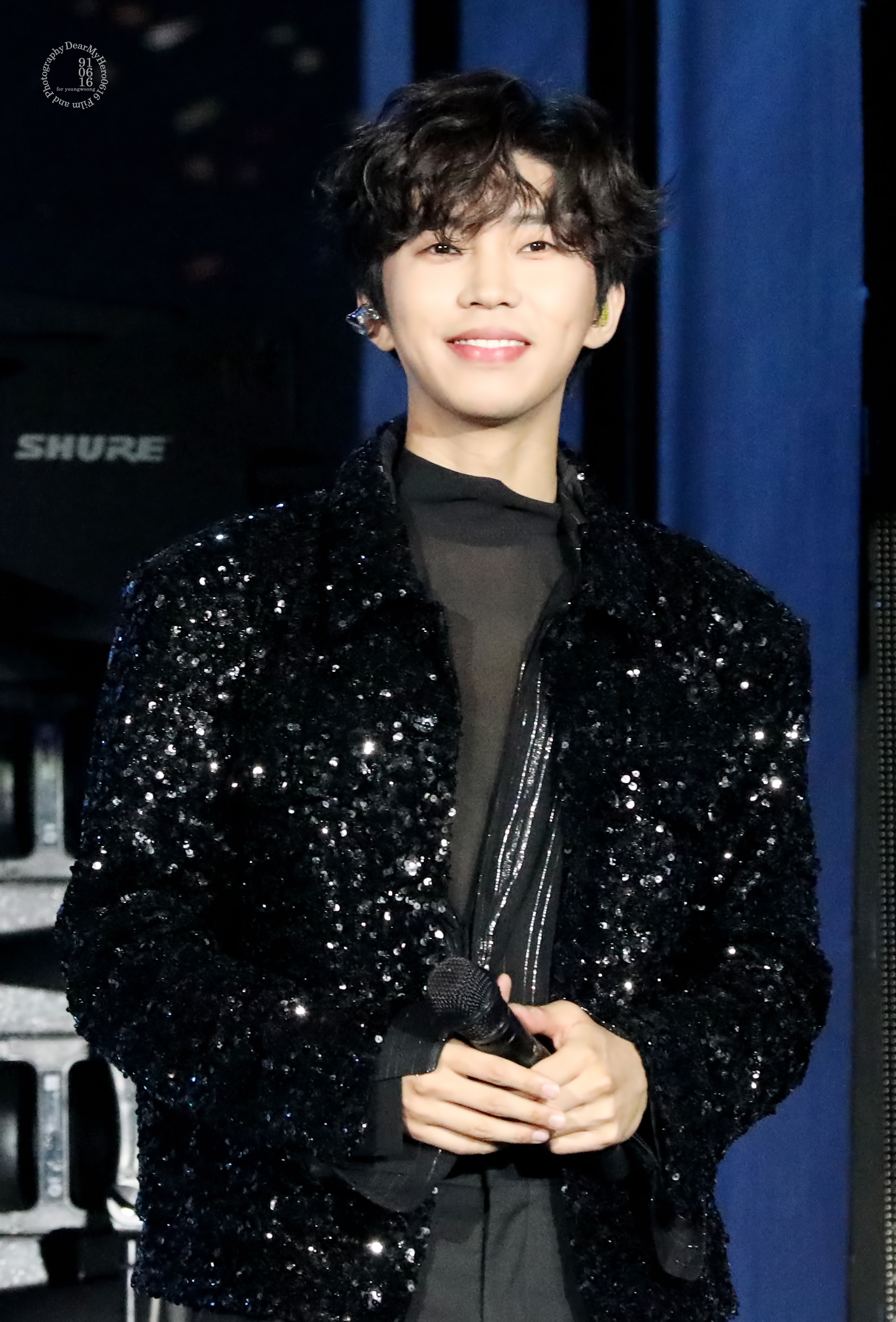
- Lim in 2022
- Born: June 16, 1991 (age 35); Pocheon, South Korea
- Other name: Lim Hero (or Im Hero) (Note: In the Korean language, Lim's first name "Young-woong" is pronounced the same as the word "yeong-ung", which means "hero" in the English language (see Wiktionary:영웅).)
- Education: Kyungbok University (Department of Practical Music)
- Occupations: Singer; entertainer; YouTuber
- Years active: 2016–present
- Musical career
- Genres: Trot, Ballad, K-pop
- Instrument: Vocals
- Labels: Mulgogi Music; New Era Project
- Website: mulgogimusic.com

YouTube information
- Channel: 임영웅
- Subscribers: 1.73 million
- Views: 2.96 billion
- Last updated: 26 August 2025

Korean name
- Hangul: 임영웅
- Hanja: 林英雄
- RR: Im Yeongung
- MR: Im Yŏngung

Lim Young-woong (Korean: 임영웅; born June 16, 1991) is a South Korean singer and YouTuber. He signed with Mulgogi Music in 2016 and debuted as a singer with his first single "Hate You". Four years later, he rose to stardom after competing on the reality television show Mr. Trot, where he won first place out of 17,000 applicants. In 2021, Lim achieved his first number-one song on the Gaon Digital Chart with the single "My Starry Love".

Since his debut in 2016, Lim has released two studio albums and one collaborative medley album, scoring nine Gaon Digital Chart number-ones. He is also the first trot artist ever to receive the Gold Play Button for achieving one million subscribers on his official YouTube channel.

== Career ==
=== 2016–2019: Career beginnings ===
Lim initially dreamt of being a ballad singer, but later discovered his talent as a trot singer after winning an Excellence Prize at a singing contest. In 2016, Lim appeared on KBS1's singing competition show Korea Sings, winning an Excellence Prize there after performing Shin Yu's song "If You Smile, You'll Get Younger, If You Get Angry, You'll Only Get Older" (일소일소 일노일노; Ilsoilso illoillo). He also appeared as a contestant in the first season of SBS' music reality show Fantastic Duo that year. Shortly after, he signed with his current label Mulgogi Music.

On August 8, 2016, the singer made his debut through the release of digital single "Hate You" (미워요; Miwoyo). (Note: "Hate You" was released with its B-side track "Rain Shower" (소나기; Sonagi).) He then released another single entitled "What's So Important?" (뭣이 중헌디; Mwosi jungheondi) on January 2, 2017. (Note: "What's So Important?" was released with its B-side track "Fill It Up" (따라따라; Ttarattara).) However, these two singles did not do well commercially.

Lim slowly gained popularity through his appearance in KBS1's morning show AM Plaza, where he became the final winner of its televised audition "Challenge! Dream Stage". On March 28, 2018, he released his third single "Elevator" (엘리베이터; Ellibeiteo). The song was re-arranged and released under the title "Not by Stairs, but by Elevator" (계단 말고 엘리베이터; Gyedan malgo ellibeiteo) almost five months later. (Note: The song's official English title is simply "Elevator". However, to avoid confusion with Lim's third single, it was replaced with the song title's sense-for-sense translation here.) On December 21 that year, Lim released a collaborative medley album with fellow trot singer Park Seo-jin, titled Newness of Trot (트로트의 신; Teuroteuui sin). The album's popularity at expressway rest areas made him called the "Expressway Idol Star".

Lim was appointed as the ambassador for the city of Pocheon on July 23, 2019.

=== 2020–present: Mr. Trot and rising popularity ===
Lim entered TV Chosun's music competition show Mr. Trot, which aired from January 2 to March 14, 2020. During the final episode of the show, he was eventually crowned the winner out of 17,000 applicants. He said, "I'm so thankful for my mother and grandmother. The live finals were held on the anniversary of my father's passing. I'll think he gave us a gift because he felt sorry for leaving my mother alone. I really thank my father as well." After the show ended, he additionally signed a one-and-a-half-year management contract with New Era Project. He also joined the main cast of Romantic Call Centre and Ppongsoongah School, the follow-up variety shows of Mr. Trot.

On April 3, 2020, Lim released a single titled "Trust in Me". Written by lyricist Kim Eana and composer Cho Young-soo, the track was produced as a special song for Lim as the Mr. Trot winner. "Trust in Me" attained commercial success, becoming Lim's first top-20 single in his native country. The song debuted at number 20 on South Korea's Gaon Digital Chart, later peaking at number 11. At the end of the year, it earned him a Melon Music Award for Best Trot and a Genie Music Award for Best Trot Track.

In August 2020, the Sisa Journal, one of the major weekly news magazines in South Korea, announced the results of "2020, Who Makes Korea Move" survey. Lim was ranked 5th (5.8%, tied with singer Lee Hyori) for leading the Mr. Trot craze and occupying the advertising world. Later that year, the magazine named him one of the "100 Leaders for the Next Generation". In addition to his singing career, Lim made his cameo appearance on TV Chosun's historical fantasy series Kingmaker: The Change of Destiny.

On October 1, 2020, he made his debut as an emcee, co-hosting the first annual Trot Awards with television presenter Kim Sung-joo and actress Jo Bo-ah. He also made his big screen debut through Mr. Trot: The Movie, a musical documentary film starring the top six finalists of Mr. Trot. The film was a commercial success, selling more than 150,000 tickets after release.

On November 4, 2020, Lim collaborated with SsangYong Motor on the promotional single "Hero". (Note: At that time, Lim worked as a spokesmodel for the company's SUV brand SsangYong Rexton.) Unlike his previous singles, the song's musical style approximates pop music. He premiered the track at an online showcase hosted by the company. Despite not being heavily promoted after release, "Hero" gave Lim his first top-10 single on the Gaon Digital Chart, debuting and peaking at number seven. On December 16, 2020, Lim was announced as a winner of the 2021 Korea Image Awards, being awarded as a member of Trot Men, the top six finalists of Mr. Trot. They were given the Stepping Stone Award for "their work on revitalizing the lives of people exhausted from COVID-19 and spreading out trot music all over the world". (Note: The actual awards ceremony was held on January 14, 2021.)

As a result of his rising popularity in 2020, Lim became the most searched figure on web portal Naver that year. At the end of the same year, according to the annual survey conducted by Gallup Korea for Singer of the Year, he was named one of the five most favorite singers by both people aged 13–39 (no. 4) and people aged 40 and over (no. 1). Furthermore, he was the second most-streamed artist domestically on YouTube that year, only behind boy band BTS.

Lim released the single "My Starry Love" on March 9, 2021, one year after winning Mr. Trot. The song was penned by Seol Woon-do, one of South Korea's best-known trot singer-songwriters. Five days prior to its release, he premiered the song at the finals of the second season of Miss Trot. "My Starry Love" debuted atop the Gaon Digital Chart, making it the first number-one single of his career. The song also earned Lim the first music program award ever since his debut, winning first place on MBC's Show! Music Core. This feat made him the first trot artist to receive a music show win in 14 years since Kang Jin on KBS2's Music Bank in 2007.

On May 2, 2022, Lim released his first studio album, Im Hero, which includes a wide range of genres aside from ballad and trot, such as pop rock, reggae hip-hop, jazz, and folk pop. One of the tracks from the album titled "Our Blues, Our Life" was pre-released on April 17.

On November 15, 2022, Lim released the double single "Polaroid", containing the pop rock tracks "Polaroid" and "London Boy". The latter marks his first songwriting credit as a lyricist and composer.

Lim released the single "Grains of Sand" on June 5, 2023. The single marked his second songwriting credit as lyricist and composer. Lim then released the digital single "Do or Die" on October 9, 2023. Lim then released double singles "Warmth" and "Home" on May 6, 2024.

Lim released his second studio album, Im Hero 2, on August 29, 2025. It was his first album release in more than 3 years and would include a wide range of genres aside from ballad and trot, such as pop, hip-hop, dance, and folk pop.

Lim released a 10-track special digital album, Im Hero 10, on September 8, 2026. The album is led by the title track "ToTo", in which Lim is also credited lyricist and composer.

== Other ventures ==
=== As a YouTuber ===
Lim began using his eponymous YouTube channel in 2016 with an official audio video for the debut song "Hate You". On December 4 that year, he uploaded his first song cover video featuring his cover of Nam Jin and Jang Yoon-jeong's duet song "I Like You" (당신이 좋아; Dangsini joa). Since then, Lim has promoted himself, steadily posting his song cover videos there. He has also communicated with his fans through the channel, posting contents including behind-the-scenes, live performance videos, highlight clips, comment reading, birthday live broadcast, and vlogs. On February 23, 2021, Lim opened a YouTube Shorts channel named "Lim Young-woong Shorts", with his 28-second competition practice video for Mr. Trot uploaded the same day.

Lim received the Silver Play Button for having more than 100,000 subscribers on his official channel in March 2020. In October that same year, the channel surpassed one million subscribers, making him the first trot artist to achieve this feat. He expressed his gratitude through a handwritten letter by saying, "All of you gave me the honor of having one million subscribers [on YouTube]. I'll always do my best, never forgetting my first time, just like how desperate I was at the beginning." He received the Gold Play Button the following month.

The most-viewed video on Lim's official channel is his Mr. Trot performance of "The Story of an Old Couple in Their 60s" (어느 60대 노부부 이야기; Eoneu 60dae nobubu iyagi). As of November 15, 2021, it has gained over 47 million views.

=== Philanthropy ===
On March 8, 2022, Lim donated ₩100 million to the Fruit of Love Social Welfare Community Chest to help the victims of the massive wildfire that started in Uljin, Gyeongbuk and has spread to Samcheok, Gangwon. On March 11, it was confirmed that Lim donated ₩1 million for the February Good Han Star singing competition. to children with pediatric leukemia. On June 9, Lim donated ₩1.2 million prize money from the May Song competition in Good Han Star to support emergency medical expenses for childhood cancer patients, leukemia and it is rare that incurable sickness. On August 8, Lim donated ₩2 million for the July Good Han Star singing competition, to the Emotional Support Program for Children with Pediatric Leukemia and their Families. On September 1, Lim donated ₩2 million for the August Good Han Star singing competition, to the Emotional Support Program for Children with Pediatric Leukemia and their Families. In October, Lim donated ₩1.5 million as prize money from the Good Han Star Singer Competition to patients with childhood cancer deficiencies, leukemia and incurable diseases. On November 4, Lim donated ₩1.5 million in Sunhan Star Gawangjeon's prize money in October to support the emotional support of children with pediatric cancer, leukemia, and incurable diseases. On December 23, Lim donated ₩300 million on behalf of the 'Heroic Age' fandom via The Fruit of Love Social Welfare Community Chest.

In January 2023, Lim donated a total of ₩2 million from Good Star Gawangjeon to Korea Pediatric Cancer Foundation.On December 2, 2024, Lim Young-woong donated ₩300 million to the Community Chest of Korea in the name of his fan club, Hero Generation. The donation consisted of ₩200 million from Lim personally and ₩100 million from his agency.

== Personal life ==
In May 2021, Lim Young-woong was criticized after photographs surfaced showing him smoking without wearing a mask inside the DMC Digital Cube building in Mapo District, Seoul, where the TV Chosun variety show Ppong School was being filmed. He was subsequently fined for violating regulations related to indoor smoking. Later, a photograph apparently showing him smoking at the venue of a Mister Trot concert in Busan was also made public, and Haeundae District authorities imposed a fine on him retroactively. The incident led to criticism and controversy over his conduct, with some online backlash occurring

Lim was reported in March 2025 to have fallen behind on local tax, after which Mapo District Office seized his Mecenatpolis penthouse in Hapjeong-dong in October 2024. The ₩5.1 billion unit, bought in September 2022, had the seizure lifted on 13 January 2025. Some coverage treated the arrears as a lapse in a high-earner’s tax duties. Fish Music said the building’s mailbox is on the third floor rather than at the entrance, that local-tax bills had gone unseen for a time, that payment was made as soon as the seizure came to light in early 2025, and that the attachment had been released. The agency apologized for not watching the matter more closely.

== Discography ==
- Im Hero (2022)
- Im Hero 2 (2025)
- Im Hero 10 (2026)

== Filmography ==
=== Film ===
Title	Year	Role	Notes	Ref.
Mr. Trot: The Movie (미스터트롯: 더 무비)	2020	Himself (as a member of Mr. Trot Top 6), narrator	Musical documentary film	
IM HERO The Final (아임 히어로 더 파이널)	2023	Himself	Concert film	

=== Music show ===
Title	Year	Role	Notes	Ref.
Hall of Music (음악의 전당)	2017	Performer	July 1	
National Top 10 Gayo Show	2017–2020	Performer		
Golden Oldies	2018–2019	Performer		
Show! Music Core	2020–2021	Performer	Episodes 674–675, 718–719	
Show Champion	2020–2021	Performer	Episodes 349, 388	
Inkigayo	2020	Performer	Episode 1042	
MBC Gayo Daejejeon	2020	Performer	December 31	
M Countdown	2021	Performer	Episode 702	
The Show	2021	Performer	Episode 255	

=== Variety show ===
Title	Year	Role	Notes	Ref.
Korea Sings	2016–2019	Contestant (pre-debut)	Episode 1787 (2016)	
Korea Sings	2016–2019	Guest singer	Episode 1900, year-end special (2018)	
Korea Sings	2016–2019	Guest singer	Episodes 1938, 1964 (2019)	
Fantastic Duo (season 1)	2016	Contestant (pre-debut)	Episode 12	
Mr. Trot	2020	Contestant, final winner		
The Taste of Mr. Trot	2020	Main cast (as a member of Mr. Trot Top 7)		
Romantic Call Centre	2020–present	Main cast (as a member of Mr. Trot Top 7)		
Ppongsoongah School	2020–2022	Main cast (with Young Tak, Lee Chan-won, Jang Minho, Kim Hee-jae and Boom)		
Immortal Songs: Singing the Legend	2020	Performer (as a member of Mr. Trot Top 6)	Episodes 457–458	
Miss Trot (season 2)	2020–2021	Special judge (as a member of Mr. Trot Top 6)	Episodes 1–3 (2020)	
Miss Trot (season 2)	2020–2021	Himself (with Young Tak, Lee Chan-won, Jang Minho and Boom)	Special episode "Lucky Trot Festival" (2021)	
Miss Trot (season 2)	2020–2021	Special performer (as a member of Mr. Trot Top 6)	Episode 11 (2021)	
Miss Trot (season 2)	2020–2021	Special performer (as Mr. Trot final winner)	Episode 12 (2021)	

=== Television series ===
Title	Year	Role	Notes	Ref.
Kingmaker: The Change of Destiny	2020	One of would-be singers	Cameo (episode 11)	

=== News and current affairs ===
Title	Year	Role	Notes	Ref.
AM Plaza	2017–2019	Audition contestant, final winner	"Challenge! Dream Stage" audition (2017–2018)	
AM Plaza	2017–2019	Guest	Episodes 8382, 8387 (2019)	
TV Chosun News 9	2020	Guest	March 16 (with Young Tak and Lee Chan-won)	
TV Chosun News 9	2020	Guest	April 10	
Investigative Journalism Seven	2020	Himself	Episode 101 ("The Secret of Mr. Trot Fever")	

=== Hosting ===
Title	Year	Notes	Ref.
2020 Trot Awards	2020	with Kim Sung-joo and Jo Bo-ah	

=== Radio show ===
Title	Year	Role	Notes	Ref.
Choi Il-gu's Hurricane Radio (최일구의 허리케인 라디오)	2019–2020	Audition contestant, final winner	"Hard Singer Survival" audition (2019)	
Choi Il-gu's Hurricane Radio (최일구의 허리케인 라디오)	2019–2020	Guest (with Lee Chan-won and Jang Minho)	July 16 (2020)	
Melon Trot Show (멜론트롯쇼)	2021	Host (as a member of Mr. Trot Top 6)	February 10, 16, 23	

== Concerts and tours ==
Year	Title	Region	Shows	Ref.
2018	First Solo Concert: Lim Young-woong's Palette Date: July 28, 2018 – Seoul – Enter-6	South Korea	1	
2019	Lim Young-woong Concert in Busan and Seoul Dates: February 23, 2019 – Busan – Shinsegae Centum City; March 3, 2019 – Seoul – Hongdae Dream Hall	South Korea	2	
2019	Lunch Concert: Newness of Trot Date: June 16, 2019 – Seoul – Seoul Marina	South Korea	1	
2022	National Tour 'IM HERO 2022' Dates: December 10 and 11, 2022 – Seoul – Gocheok Sky Dome; 2022 – Busan –	South Korea	2 (+2?)	
2023	National Tour 'IM HERO 2023' Dates: 27,28 and 29 October, 3, 4 and 5 November 2023 – Seoul – KSPO Dome (360 degree stage); 24, 25 and 26 November 2023 – Daegu – Daegu Exco Dongguan; 8, 9 and 10 December 2023 – Busan – BEXCO 1st Exhibition Hall 1 and 2; 29, 30 and 31 December 2023 – Daejeon – Daejeon Convention Center 2nd exhibition Hall; 5, 6 and 7 January 2024 – Gwangju – Kim Dae-jung Convention Center	South Korea	18	
2020	Mr. Trot Tour Concert Dates: August 7 to 16, 2020 – Seoul – KSPO Dome; October 30 – November 1, 2020 – Busan – BEXCO; November 6 to 8, 2020 – Gwangju – Gwangju Women's University Universiade Gymnasium; November 12 to 15, 2020 – Seoul – KSPO Dome	South Korea	24	
2024	IM HERO - THE STADIUM Dates: 25 and 26 May 2024 – Seoul – Seoul World Cup Stadium		2	
