= 33rd Hanteo Music Awards =

2026 South Korean music award ceremony

- Official poster
- Date: February 15, 2026
- Venue: KSPO Dome, Seoul
- Country: South Korea
- Hosted by: Lee Chan-won; Tiffany Young
- Most awards: Stray Kids (6)
- Website: awards.hanteo.com

Television/radio coverage
- Network: MBN; TikTok

The 33rd Hanteo Music Awards, presented by Hanteo Global, is an award show held at KSPO Dome in Seoul on February 15, 2026. It recognized the best artists and recordings, primarily based on Hanteo Chart data gathered from January to December 2025. The event was hosted by Lee Chan-won and Tiffany Young.

== Criteria ==
All songs and albums eligible for nomination must be released between January 1 and December 31, 2025.

| Category | Hanteo Global score (Note: Hanteo Global score reflects a comprehensive analysis based on the vast amount of big data of albums/records, digital music, social media, portals, broadcasting & media, and end users collected through Hanteo Chart and Whosfan Big Data Lab.) | Global voting score | Judging score |
|---|---|---|---|
| Grand Prize (Note: Consists of Best Artist, Best Album, Best Song, and Best Performance) | 50% | 20% | 30% |
| Categories by Artist (Note: Consists of Artist of the Year, Post Generation, Emerging Artist, and Rookie of the Year) | 40% | 30% | 30% |
| Special Genre Award (Note: Consists of Special Award – Ballad, Special Award – Band, Special Award – Hip-hop, and Special Award – Trot) | 30% | 40% | 30% |
| Global Artist Award | 50% | 50% | —N/a |
| WhosFandom Award | —N/a | 100% | —N/a |

== Performers ==
The first line-up of performers were announced on January 27. The second line-up of performers were announced on February 3. Additional performers were announced on February 10.

Performances for Day 1
| Artist(s) | Song(s) Performed |
|---|---|
| Wing | "Dopamine" |
| Idntt | "We Are the Future" "Heartbreaker" "Clap" |
| TripleS | Intro (dance performance by Heejin and Yoon Seo-yeon) "Fake Love" "Bubble Gum Girl" "Cameo Love" "Q&A" "Fly Up" "Rising" |
| Artms | Intro + "Icarus" "The Boys" |
| Nowz | Intro + "Homerun" |
| Hearts2Hearts | Intro + "Style" |
| 8Turn | "Bruise" |
| Billlie | "Cloud Palace" |
| Idntt | "Pretty Boy Swag" |
| WEi | Intro + "Home" "Domino" |
| Pentagon | "With Universe" "Shine" |
| Lucy | Intro + "EIO" |
| Hwang Ka-ram | "I'm Firefly" |
| Son Tae-jin | Intro + "Melody of Love" "For You, I Sing" |
| Forestella | "Piano Man" |
| Park Ji-hyeon | Intro + "We Can Make It" "I Like It When You Smile" |
| Xikers | Intro + "Superpower (Peak)" |
| Kim Hee-jae | Intro + "Follow Me" "Love, Please" |
| Lee Young-ji | "Winner Cypher" "Fraktsiya" "DNA" (remix) "Blue Check" "We" "I Am Lee Young-ji" |
| Lee Chan-won | Intro + "My Trip" "Maybe Today" |
| Lee Chang-sub | "Trickle Down" |
| Kyuhyun | "Like Our First Snow" "At Gwanghwamun" |

== Presenters ==
The line-up of presenters was announced on February 15.

- Kim Chang-wan
- Brian
- Peppertones
- Lia Kim
- Hanhae
- Seolhyun
- Lee Mi-joo
- Kwak Be-om
- Jung Yi-rang
- Nam Chang-hee
- Kany
- Jung Ji-so
- Kim Dong-joon
- Yu Baek-hap

== Winners and nominees ==
Winners and nominees are listed in alphanumerical order, with winners listed first and emphasised in bold.

=== Grand Prize ===
| Best Artist (Daesang) | Best Album (Daesang) |
|---|---|
| **Ateez** | **Stray Kids – Karma** |
| Best Song (Daesang) | Best Performance (Daesang) |
| **G-Dragon – "Too Bad" (feat. Anderson .Paak)** | **Enhypen** |

=== Main & Special Awards ===
The list of main categories and genre nominees was announced in January 2026, through Hanteo Music Awards social media posts. Voting opened on the WhosFan, Fancast, and Mubeat apps from January 16, and will run until February 4.

| Artists of the Year (Bonsang) | Rookie of the Year |
|---|---|
| **Aespa**; **Ateez**; **BoyNextDoor**; **Enhypen**; **G-Dragon**; **Lee Chan-won**; **NCT Wish**; **Plave**; **Seventeen**; **Stray Kids**; List of nominees: &Team; Babymonster; Baekhyun; Cortis; Day6; Fromis 9; Hearts2Hearts; I-dle; Illit; Itzy; IU; Ive; J-Hope; Jennie; Jin; KickFlip; Le Sserafim; Mark; Monsta X; Nmixx; NCT Dream; Riize; Rosé; Super Junior; The Boyz; Tomorrow X Together; Treasure; Tws; Twice; Zerobaseone | **Cortis**; **Hearts2Hearts**; AHOF; AllDay Project; AxMxP; Close Your Eyes; Cosmosy; Hebi.; Hitgs; Idid; Ifeye; In a Minute; KickFlip; KiiiKiii; Newbeat; Nouera; UAU; Uspeer; Xlov; XngHan&Xoul |
| Post Generation Award | Emerging Artist |
| **Isegye Idol**; **WEi**; Epex; Fifty Fifty; H1-Key; Kep1er; Park Ji-hyeon; P1Harmony; STAYC; Tempest; Viviz; Xdinary Heroes; Xikers; Yena; Younite | **Artms**; **Evnne**; Ampers&One; Izna; Kiss of Life; Meovv; Nexz; Nowz; N.SSign; QWER; Rescene; Say My Name; TripleS; Unis |
| Special Award – Ballad | Special Award – Band |
| **Lee Mu-jin**; Brown Eyed Soul; Car, the Garden; Davichi; Hwang Ka-ram; Jung Seung-hwan; Paul Kim; Roy Kim; Woody; Yerin Baek | **Lucy**; CNBLUE; Day6; Lee Seung-yoon; N.Flying; Onewe; QWER; Xdinary Heroes |
| Special Award – Independent | Special Award – R&B or Hip-hop |
| **Lee Seung-yoon**; Choi Yu-ree; George; Hanroro; Heo Hoy-kyung; Nerd Connection; O3ohn; Touched; Woo Ye-rin; YdBB | **Lee Young-ji**; Ash Island; Changmo; Crush; Dynamic Duo; Heize; J-Hope; Woodz; Zion.T; Zico |
| Special Award – Trot | Special Award – Virtual |
| **Lee Chan-won**; Ahn Sung-hoon; Daesung; Jang Minho; Kim Hee-jae; Kim Yong-bin; Lim Young-woong; Park Ji-hyeon; Park Seo-jin; Song Ga-in; Young Tak | **Plave**; Hebi.; Iiterniti; Isegye Idol; Naevis; Re:Revolution; Skinz |
| **Lee Chan-won**; Ahn Sung-hoon; Daesung; Jang Minho; Kim Hee-jae; Kim Yong-bin; Lim Young-woong; Park Ji-hyeon; Park Seo-jin; Song Ga-in; Young Tak | Special Award – Remake |
| **Lee Chan-won**; Ahn Sung-hoon; Daesung; Jang Minho; Kim Hee-jae; Kim Yong-bin; Lim Young-woong; Park Ji-hyeon; Park Seo-jin; Song Ga-in; Young Tak | **Hwang Ka-ram** |
Special Award – OST
**Lim Young-woong – "Heavenly Ever After" (from Heavenly Ever After)**; D.O. – "Forever" (from Resident Playbook); Doyoung – "I Find You" (from Bon Appétit, Your Majesty); Huntrix, Saja Boys, and KPop Demon Hunters Cast – KPop Demon Hunters (Soundtrack from the Netflix Film); Kenshi Yonezu – "Iris Out" (from Chainsaw Man – The Movie: Reze Arc); Kenshi Yonezu and Hikaru Utada – "Jane Doe" (from Chainsaw Man – The Movie: Reze Arc); Paul Kim – "Always Be With You" (from Love Scout); Rosé – "Messy" (from F1); Tomorrow X Together – "When the Day Comes" (from Resident Playbook); Yang Ji-eun – "You're Enough for Me" (from Marie and Her Three Daddies); Young Tak – "Unknown Life" (from For Eagle Brothers)

=== Global Artist & Popularity Awards ===
The list of nominees for the Global Artist Award was announced in January 2026. The voting began on January 5 and continued until February 7, 2026. The list of nominees for WhosFandom Award was announced through Whosfan official Twitter account in December 2025, and voting for Top 40 started through the platform from December 29, 2025, to January 1, 2026. while the final voting for Top 2 commenced on the Whosfan app from January 24 to January 25, 2026.

| Best Continent Artist – Africa | Best Continent Artist – Asia |
|---|---|
| **Stray Kids**; List of nominees: &Team; Aespa; AHOF; AllDay Project; Ateez; Babymonster; Baekhyun; BoyNextDoor; BSS; BTS; Close Your Eyes; Cortis; Cravity; CxM; Day6; Enhypen; Fromis 9; G-Dragon; Haechan; Hebi.; Hearts2Hearts; HxW; Hwasa; I-dle; Idid; Illit; Isegye Idol; Itzy; IU; Ive; Izna; J-Hope; Jennie; Jin; Jisoo; KPop Demon Hunters Cast; KickFlip; KiiiKiii; Kiss of Life; Lee Chan-won; Lee Chang-sub; Le Sserafim; Lim Young-woong; Lisa; Mark; Minnie; Monsta X; N.Flying; NCT Dream; NCT Wish; Nexz; Nmixx; Nouera; P1Harmony; Park Ji-hyeon; Plave; QWER; Rescene; Riize; Rosé; Secret Number; Seventeen; Shinee; STAYC; Super Junior; Tempest; The Boyz; Tomorrow X Together; Treasure; TripleS; Twice; TWS; Unis; Viviz; Woodz; Yeonjun; Young Tak; Yuqi; Zerobaseone | **Tomorrow X Together**; List of nominees: &Team; Aespa; AHOF; AllDay Project; Ateez; Babymonster; Baekhyun; BoyNextDoor; BSS; BTS; Close Your Eyes; Cortis; Cravity; CxM; Day6; Enhypen; Fromis 9; G-Dragon; Haechan; Hebi.; Hearts2Hearts; HxW; Hwasa; I-dle; Idid; Illit; Isegye Idol; Itzy; IU; Ive; Izna; J-Hope; Jennie; Jin; Jisoo; KPop Demon Hunters Cast; KickFlip; KiiiKiii; Kiss of Life; Lee Chan-won; Lee Chang-sub; Le Sserafim; Lim Young-woong; Lisa; Mark; Minnie; Monsta X; N.Flying; NCT Dream; NCT Wish; Nexz; Nmixx; Nouera; P1Harmony; Park Ji-hyeon; Plave; QWER; Rescene; Riize; Rosé; Secret Number; Seventeen; Shinee; STAYC; Stray Kids; Super Junior; Tempest; The Boyz; Treasure; TripleS; Twice; TWS; Unis; Viviz; Woodz; Yeonjun; Young Tak; Yuqi; Zerobaseone |
| Best Continent Artist – Europe | Best Continent Artist – North America |
| **Stray Kids**; List of nominees: &Team; Aespa; AHOF; AllDay Project; Ateez; Babymonster; Baekhyun; BoyNextDoor; BSS; BTS; Close Your Eyes; Cortis; Cravity; CxM; Day6; Enhypen; Fromis 9; G-Dragon; Haechan; Hebi.; Hearts2Hearts; HxW; Hwasa; I-dle; Idid; Illit; Isegye Idol; Itzy; IU; Ive; Izna; J-Hope; Jennie; Jin; Jisoo; KPop Demon Hunters Cast; KickFlip; KiiiKiii; Kiss of Life; Lee Chan-won; Lee Chang-sub; Le Sserafim; Lim Young-woong; Lisa; Mark; Minnie; Monsta X; N.Flying; NCT Dream; NCT Wish; Nexz; Nmixx; Nouera; P1Harmony; Park Ji-hyeon; Plave; QWER; Rescene; Riize; Rosé; Secret Number; Seventeen; Shinee; STAYC; Super Junior; Tempest; The Boyz; Tomorrow X Together; Treasure; TripleS; Twice; TWS; Unis; Viviz; Woodz; Yeonjun; Young Tak; Yuqi; Zerobaseone | **Stray Kids**; List of nominees: &Team; Aespa; AHOF; AllDay Project; Ateez; Babymonster; Baekhyun; BoyNextDoor; BSS; BTS; Close Your Eyes; Cortis; Cravity; CxM; Day6; Enhypen; Fromis 9; G-Dragon; Haechan; Hebi.; Hearts2Hearts; HxW; Hwasa; I-dle; Idid; Illit; Isegye Idol; Itzy; IU; Ive; Izna; J-Hope; Jennie; Jin; Jisoo; KPop Demon Hunters Cast; KickFlip; KiiiKiii; Kiss of Life; Lee Chan-won; Lee Chang-sub; Le Sserafim; Lim Young-woong; Lisa; Mark; Minnie; Monsta X; N.Flying; NCT Dream; NCT Wish; Nexz; Nmixx; Nouera; P1Harmony; Park Ji-hyeon; Plave; QWER; Rescene; Riize; Rosé; Secret Number; Seventeen; Shinee; STAYC; Super Junior; Tempest; The Boyz; Tomorrow X Together; Treasure; TripleS; Twice; TWS; Unis; Viviz; Woodz; Yeonjun; Young Tak; Yuqi; Zerobaseone |
| Best Continent Artist – Oceania | Best Continent Artist – South America |
| **Tomorrow X Together**; List of nominees: &Team; Aespa; AHOF; AllDay Project; Ateez; Babymonster; Baekhyun; BoyNextDoor; BSS; BTS; Close Your Eyes; Cortis; Cravity; CxM; Day6; Enhypen; Fromis 9; G-Dragon; Haechan; Hebi.; Hearts2Hearts; HxW; Hwasa; I-dle; Idid; Illit; Isegye Idol; Itzy; IU; Ive; Izna; J-Hope; Jennie; Jin; Jisoo; KPop Demon Hunters Cast; KickFlip; KiiiKiii; Kiss of Life; Lee Chan-won; Lee Chang-sub; Le Sserafim; Lim Young-woong; Lisa; Mark; Minnie; Monsta X; N.Flying; NCT Dream; NCT Wish; Nexz; Nmixx; Nouera; P1Harmony; Park Ji-hyeon; Plave; QWER; Rescene; Riize; Rosé; Secret Number; Seventeen; Shinee; STAYC; Stray Kids; Super Junior; Tempest; The Boyz; Treasure; TripleS; Twice; TWS; Unis; Viviz; Woodz; Yeonjun; Young Tak; Yuqi; Zerobaseone | **Stray Kids**; List of nominees: &Team; Aespa; AHOF; AllDay Project; Ateez; Babymonster; Baekhyun; BoyNextDoor; BSS; BTS; Close Your Eyes; Cortis; Cravity; CxM; Day6; Enhypen; Fromis 9; G-Dragon; Haechan; Hebi.; Hearts2Hearts; HxW; Hwasa; I-dle; Idid; Illit; Isegye Idol; Itzy; IU; Ive; Izna; J-Hope; Jennie; Jin; Jisoo; KPop Demon Hunters Cast; KickFlip; KiiiKiii; Kiss of Life; Lee Chan-won; Lee Chang-sub; Le Sserafim; Lim Young-woong; Lisa; Mark; Minnie; Monsta X; N.Flying; NCT Dream; NCT Wish; Nexz; Nmixx; Nouera; P1Harmony; Park Ji-hyeon; Plave; QWER; Rescene; Riize; Rosé; Secret Number; Seventeen; Shinee; STAYC; Super Junior; Tempest; The Boyz; Tomorrow X Together; Treasure; TripleS; Twice; TWS; Unis; Viviz; Woodz; Yeonjun; Young Tak; Yuqi; Zerobaseone |
| WhosFandom Award | Best Popular Artist |
| **Lim Young-woong – Hero Generation**; List of nominees: &Team – Luné; Aespa – My; Ateez – Atiny; Babymonster – Monstiez; Bigbang – Vip; Blackpink – Blink; BoyNextDoor – Onedoor; BTS – Army; Close Your Eyes – Closer; Cortis – Coer; Day6 – My Day; Enhypen – Engene; Exo – Exo-L; Fromis 9 – Flover; Hearts2Hearts – S2u; I-dle – Neverland; Illit – Gllit; Isegye Idol – Ifari; Itzy – Midzy; IU – Uaena; Ive – Dive; Izna – Naya; KickFlip – Weflip; Le Sserafim – Fearnot; Lee Chan-won – Chan's; NCT – Nctzen; Nmixx – Nswer; Plave – Plli; Riize – Briize; Seventeen – Carat; Stray Kids – Stay; The Boyz – The B; Tomorrow X Together – Moa; Treasure – Treasure Maker; TripleS – Wav; TWS – 42; Twice – Once; Verivery – Verrer; Zerobaseone – Zerose | **Lim Young-woong**; List of nominees: &Team; Aespa; AHOF; AllDay Project; Ateez; Babymonster; Baekhyun; BoyNextDoor; BSS; BTS; Close Your Eyes; Cortis; Cravity; CxM; Day6; Enhypen; Fromis 9; G-Dragon; Haechan; Hebi.; Hearts2Hearts; HxW; Hwasa; I-dle; Idid; Illit; Isegye Idol; Itzy; IU; Ive; Izna; J-Hope; Jennie; Jin; Jisoo; KPop Demon Hunters Cast; KickFlip; KiiiKiii; Kiss of Life; Lee Chan-won; Lee Chang-sub; Le Sserafim; Lisa; Mark; Minnie; Monsta X; N.Flying; NCT Dream; NCT Wish; Nexz; Nmixx; Nouera; P1Harmony; Park Ji-hyeon; Plave; QWER; Rescene; Riize; Rosé; Secret Number; Seventeen; Shinee; STAYC; Stray Kids; Super Junior; Tempest; The Boyz; Treasure; TripleS; Twice; TWS; Unis; Viviz; Woodz; Yeonjun; Young Tak; Yuqi; Zerobaseone |
| Best Global Popular Artist | Best Artist Pick |
| **BTS**; List of nominees: &Team; Aespa; AHOF; AllDay Project; Ateez; Babymonster; Baekhyun; BoyNextDoor; BSS; Close Your Eyes; Cortis; Cravity; CxM; Day6; Enhypen; Fromis 9; G-Dragon; Haechan; Hebi.; Hearts2Hearts; HxW; Hwasa; I-dle; Idid; Illit; Isegye Idol; Itzy; IU; Ive; Izna; J-Hope; Jennie; Jin; Jisoo; KPop Demon Hunters Cast; KickFlip; KiiiKiii; Kiss of Life; Lee Chan-won; Lee Chang-sub; Le Sserafim; Lim Young-woong; Lisa; Mark; Minnie; Monsta X; N.Flying; NCT Dream; NCT Wish; Nexz; Nmixx; Nouera; P1Harmony; Park Ji-hyeon; Plave; QWER; Rescene; Riize; Rosé; Secret Number; Seventeen; Shinee; STAYC; Stray Kids; Super Junior; Tempest; The Boyz; Tomorrow X Together; Treasure; TripleS; Twice; TWS; Unis; Viviz; Woodz; Yeonjun; Young Tak; Yuqi; Zerobaseone | **Hearts2Hearts**; **Lee Chan-won**; List of nominees: 8Turn; Artms; Ateez; Billlie; Forestella; Hwang Ka-ram; Idntt; Kim Hee-jae; Kyuhyun; Lee Chan-won; Lee Young-ji; Lee Chang-sub; Lucy; Nowz; Park Ji-hyeon; Pentagon; Son Tae-jin; TripleS; WEi; Wing; Xikers; Yoon Jong-shin |

=== Other awards ===
| Best Adult Contemporary | Special Crossover |
|---|---|
| **Kim Hee-jae**; **Park Ji-hyeon**; **Son Tae-jin** | **Forestella** |
| Blooming Star Award | Next Wave |
| **8Turn**; **Idntt**; **Nowz** | **Billlie**; **TripleS**; **Xikers** |
| Special Collaboration | World Stage |
| **Wing** | **Ateez** |
| Best of Ballad | 10th Anniversary Influential Artist |
| **Lee Chang-sub** | **Pentagon** |
| 20th Anniversary Wannabe Icon Artist | 30th Anniversary Legend of the Age |
| **Kyuhyun** | **Yoon Jong-shin** |

== Multiple awards ==
The following artist(s) received two or more awards:

| Count | Artist(s) |
|---|---|
| 6 | Stray Kids |
| 3 | Ateez |
| 3 | Lee Chan-won |
| 3 | Lim Young-woong |
| 2 | Enhypen |
| 2 | Hearts2Hearts |
| 2 | G-Dragon |
| 2 | Plave |
| 2 | Tomorrow X Together |
