= Asia Star Entertainer Awards 2024 =

2024 award ceremony

ASEA 2024
- Date: April 10, 2024
- Location: K-Arena Yokohama
- Country: Japan
- Presented by: Newsen; @Star1
- Hosted by: Kwon Yu-ri; Ok Taec-yeon

Highlights
- Most awards: Tomorrow X Together (4)

Television/radio coverage
- Network: Naver TV; U-Next

The Asia Star Entertainer Awards 2024 (abbreviated as ASEA 2024) was an award ceremony held on April 10, 2024, at K-Arena Yokohama, located in Yokohama, Japan. The event was hosted by Kwon Yu-ri and Ok Taec-yeon

== Cast ==
=== Host ===
The host line-up was announced on February 2, 2024.

- Kwon Yu-ri
- Ok Taec-yeon

=== Performers ===
The first performers line-up was announced on February 5, 2024. The next lineup was announced on February 8, February 14, February 16, February 20, February 26,

- Taemin
- The Boyz
- Tomorrow X Together
- StayC
- NiziU
- Day6
- Billlie
- Fantasy Boys
- Stray Kids
- Treasure
- TWS
- NCT Wish
- JO1
- INI
- ATBO
- Creepy Nuts
- The Rampage from Exile Tribe

=== Presenters ===
The presenters line-up was announced on February 7, 2024.

- Francine Diaz
- Song Seung-heon
- Jeon Yeo-been

== Criteria ==
The preliminary voting for 8 categories (Best Male/Female Group Award, Best Male/Female Solo Award, Best Trot, Best Virtual Group, Rookie Award, and Popularity Award) was held on Idol Champ application from January 27, 2024.

== Winner and nominees ==
Winners and nominees are listed in alphabetical order. Winners are listed first and emphasized in bold.

The Grand Prize
**Stray Kids**
Artist of the Year	Song of the Year	Album of the Year
**Tomorrow X Together**	**"Seven" – Jungkook**	**Rock-Star – Stray Kids**
Platinum of World Wide	The Platinum	Global K-Pop Leader
**Treasure**	**Tomorrow X Together**	
Best Stage		Best Touring Artist
Korea	Japan	Best Touring Artist
**The Boyz**	**JO1**	**Treasure**
Best Performance
Group	Solo	Japan
**Tomorrow X Together**	**Taemin**	**INI**
Best Hip Hop	Best Rock Ballad	Best Band
**Treasure**	**Young K**	**Day6**
Best Star	Best Star Japan	Best New Artist
**StayC**; **The Boyz**	**NiziU**; **The Rampage from Exile Tribe**	**NCT Wish**; **TWS**; **Zerobaseone**
Best Group		Best Trot
Male	Female	Best Trot
**Stray Kids**; Riize; Seventeen; Zerobaseone; Plave	**NiziU**; NewJeans; Babymonster; Ive; Itzy	**Young Tak**; Kim Ho-jung; Kim Hui-jae; Lee Chan-won; Jeong Dong-won
Best Solo
Male	Female	
**Lim Young-woong**; Kang Daniel; V; Jungkook; Taemin	**Jihyo**; IU; Yuju; Younha; Jennie; Choi Ye-na	
Best Visual Artist	Best Conceptual Artist	
Best Visual Artist	Group	Solo
**Plave**; Mave: Superkind; Isegye Idol	**The Boyz**	**Taemin**
Hot Trend
**Creepy Nuts**; **ATBO**
Hot Icon
**Fantasy Boys**; **Billlie**
Fan Choice Artist
**Lim Young-woong**
Fan Choice Rookie
**Jung Dong-won**

=== Multiple awards ===
The following artist(s) received three or more awards:

Num.	Winners
4	Tomorrow X Together
3	Stray Kids
3	The Boyz
3	Treasure
