= 31st Hanteo Music Awards =

2024 South Korean music award ceremony

- Official poster
- Date: February 17–18, 2024
- Venue: Dongdaemun Design Plaza
- Country: South Korea
- Hosted by: Changmin
- Most awards: Aespa (3)
- Website: awards.hanteo.com

Television/radio coverage
- Network: SBS M

The 31st Hanteo Music Awards (Korean: 31주년 한터뮤직어워즈 2023; RR: 31junyeon Hanteo myujig eo-wojeu; lit. '31st Anniversary Hanteo Music Awards 2023') presented by Hanteo Global was held at Dongdaemun Design Plaza in Seoul from February 17 to 18, 2024. It recognized the best artists and recordings, primarily based on Hanteo Chart data gathered from January 1 to December 31, 2023. The ceremony was hosted by Changmin. It was broadcast live on SBS M.

== Criteria ==
All songs and albums that are eligible to be nominated must be released from January to December 2023.

Category	Hanteo Global score (Note: Hanteo Global score reflects a comprehensive analysis based on the vast amount of big data of albums/records, digital music, social media, portals, broadcasting & media, and end users collected through 'Hanteo Chart' and 'Whosfan Big Data Lab'.)	Global voting score	Judging score
Best Artist (Daesang)	50%	20%	30%
Best Album (Daesang)	50%	20%	30%
Best Song (Daesang)	50%	20%	30%
Best Performance (Daesang)	50%	20%	30%
Main Prize (Bonsang)	40%	30%	30%
Global Artist Award	50%	50%	—N/a
Post Generation Award	40%	30%	30%
Emerging Artist Award	40%	30%	30%
Rookie of the Year Award	40%	30%	30%
WhosFandom Award	—N/a	100%	—N/a
Special Award	30%	40%	30%

== Winners and nominees ==
Winners and nominees are listed in alphabetical order. Winners are listed first and highlighted in bold.

The list of nominees except Best Artist, Best Album, Best Song and Best Performance was announced on January 3, 2024, through Hanteo Music Awards social media posts. Voting opened (except WhosFandom and Global Artist) on Whosfan app on January 4, and will be close on January 17, 2024. The list of nominees for WhosFandom Award was announced through Whosfan official Twitter account on November 29, 2023, and voting for Top 40 started through the platform from December 1 to 4, 2023, while voting for Top 16 to Final commenced on Whosfan app from December 11, 2023, to January 5, 2024. The list of nominees for Global Artist Award was announced on December 11, 2023, and the voting began on the same day until January 17, 2024.

=== Main awards ===
Best Artist (Daesang)	Best Album (Daesang)
**NCT Dream**	**Seventeen**
Best Song (Daesang)	Best Performance (Daesang)
**Ive**	**Stray Kids**
Main Award (Bonsang)	Rookie of the Year Award
**Aespa**; **Ateez**; **Enhypen**; **(G)I-dle**; **Ive**; **Jimin**; **Jungkook**; **Le Sserafim**; **NCT 127**; **NCT Dream**; **NewJeans**; **Seventeen**; **Stray Kids**; **Tomorrow X Together**; **V**; **Zerobaseone**; List of nominated artists: AKMU; Bol4; BoyNextDoor; BSS; CIX; Cravity; D.O.; Dreamcatcher; Epex; Exo; Itzy; J-Hope; Jeon Somi; Jihyo; Jisoo; Kep1er; Lee Chan-won; Monsta X; NCT; NCT DoJaeJung; Nmixx; P1Harmony; Red Velvet; Riize; Shinee; STAYC; Taemin; Taeyang; Taeyeon; The Boyz; Treasure; Twice; Xdinary Heroes; Young Tak	Male: **Zerobaseone**; 8Turn; Ampers&One; BoyNextDoor; Evnne; Fantasy Boys; N.SSign; Plave; Riize; Xikers; Female: **TripleS**; Kiss of Life; LimeLight; Loossemble; Odd Eye Circle; Young Posse
Post Generation Award	Emerging Artist Award
**Lee Chan-won**; AB6IX; CIX; Cravity; Jeon Somi; Jeong Dong-won; Lucy; P1Harmony; STAYC; Treasure; Vanner; Verivery; Weeekly; WEi	**Tempest**; **Viviz**; ATBO; B.I; Billlie; Epex; Kep1er; Kwon Eun-bi; Lun8; The New Six; Xdinary Heroes; Younite
WhosFandom Award
**Lim Young-woong**; List of nominated artists: (G)I-dle; Aespa; Ateez; Blackpink; BoyNextDoor; BTS; CIX; Cravity; Dreamcatcher; Enhypen; Epex; Exo; IKon; Itzy; Ive; Jeon Somi; Kep1er; Le Sserafim; Lee Chan-won; Monsta X; NCT; NewJeans; Nmixx; P1Harmony; Plave; Red Velvet; Riize; Seventeen; Shinee; STAYC; Stray Kids; The Boyz; TXT; Treasure; TripleS; Twice; Xdinary Heroes; Young Tak; Zerobaseone

=== Global Artist Award ===
Africa	Asia
**V**; BoyNextDoor; Dreamcatcher; Enhypen; Jimin; Jisoo; Jungkook; Stray Kids; Treasure; Zerobaseone	**Tomorrow X Together**; Enhypen; Jungkook; Kep1er; NCT 127; NCT Dream; Tempest; Treasure; V; Zerobaseone
Europe	North America
**V**; Dreamcatcher; Enhypen; Exo; Jimin; Jisoo; Jungkook; Nmixx; Stray Kids; Tomorrow X Together	**Tomorrow X Together**; Dreamcatcher; Enhypen; Jimin; Jisoo; Jungkook; Shownu X Hyungwon; Stray Kids; V; Zerobaseone
Oceania	South America
**Jimin**; Dreamcatcher; Jisoo; P1Harmony; Shinee; Stray Kids; Taemin; Tomorrow X Together; V; Zerobaseone	**Jimin**; Ateez; Dreamcatcher; Enhypen; Jisoo; Jungkook; Stray Kids; Tomorrow X Together; V; Zerobaseone

=== Special awards ===
Ballad	Band
**Parc Jae-jung**; Bol4; D.O.; Kim Jae-hwan; Kim Se-jeong; Lee Seok-hoon; Naul; Taeyeon	**Xdinary Heroes**; F.T. Island; Jung Yong-hwa; Lucy; Nell; Nerd Connection; Onewe; Thornapple; Young K
Hip-hop	Trot
**B.I**; Big Naughty; Crush; Epik High; Giriboy; Jessi; Loco; Sik-K	**Young Tak**; Hwang Young-woong; Jang Minho; Jeong Dong-won; Lee Chan-won; Park Seo-jin
Virtual Artist
**Plave**; Isegye Idol; Mave: Superkind

=== Other awards ===
Other Categories	Winner
Best Trend Leader	Aespa
Blooming Performance Group	8Turn
Blooming Star	Just B
Favorite Band Performance	Lucy
Favorite Crossover Group	Libelante
Favorite Vocal Performance	Kim Jae-hwan
Global Generation Icon	Aespa
Global Outstanding Artist	Nmixx
Global Rising Artist	Kiss of Life
Hanteo Choice K-pop Female Artist	Billlie
Hanteo Choice K-pop Male Artist	Vanner
Legend Rock Icon	YB
Next Worldwide Artist	Riize
Popular Band Artist	Daybreak
Popular Global Group	Kep1er
Popular Performance Group	Viviz
Popular Solo Artist	Jeong Dong-won
Top Global Performer	Ateez

== Performers ==
The complete lineup of performers were announced on February 16, 2024.

=== Day 1 ===
Order of the performance, name of the artist(s), and song(s) they performed
Order	Artist(s)	Song(s) performed
1	Libelante	"We Are the Future" (orig. song by H.O.T.), "Haru Haru" (orig. song by BigBang), "Mirotic" (orig. song by TVXQ), "Playing with Fire" (orig. song by Blackpink), "S-Class" (orig. song by Stray Kids) and "On Your Way"
2	Just B	"Medusa"
3	Vanner	"Jackpot"
4	Billlie	"Dang! (hocus pocus)"
5	Jeong Dong-won	"If"
6	Viviz	"Come On Baby Tonight" (orig. song by Lee Ye-rin)
7	Kep1er (only Chaehyun and Yeseo)	"Loveable" (orig. song by Kim Jong-kook)
8	Kim Jae-hwan	"I Love You"
9	Tempest	"Vroom Vroom" and "Dive"
10	Plave	"The 6th Summer"
11	Lucy	"Boogie Man"
12	Daybreak and Lucy	"Oh-eh"
13	Kep1er	"Galileo" and "Love on Lock"
14	DJ Vandal Rock	"Candy" (orig. song by H.O.T.), "Dreams Come True" (orig. song by S.E.S.), "Lies" (orig. song by BigBang) and "Rising Sun" (orig. song by TVXQ)
14	Just B	"Sorry, Sorry" (orig. song by Super Junior)
14	Billlie	"The Boys" (orig. song by Girls' Generation)
14	Tempest	"Dynamite" (orig. song by BTS)
15	Viviz	"Untie" and "Maniac"
16	Kim Jae-hwan	"Ponytail"
17	Lee Chan-won	"Wish Lanterns" and "Jintobaegi"

=== Day 2 ===
Performers for Day 2
Artist(s)
Ateez
NCT 127
NCT Dream
Zerobaseone
Aespa
YB
Parc Jae-jung
TripleS
Kiss of Life
8Turn

== Presenters ==
The complete list of presenters were announced on February 8, and with addition on February 13, 2024.

Presenters for Day 1
Artist(s)
Kim Jong-seo
Cho Hang-jo
Danny Ahn
Han Seung-yeon
Lee Won-seok
Choi Jung-in
Brian
Bomi
Jo Kwon
Byul
Gabee
Yoon Il-sang
Kim Hyeong-seok
Kim Dong-wan
Sunye
Aiki
Hareem

== Incidents ==
On the second day of the ceremony, there were reports of a person publicly defecating in the standing area of the audience. The smell reportedly spread throughout large portions of the venue, with several artists visibly seen covering their noses. Other audience members reported feces residue on their clothes. A physical altercation also broke out between fans of boy group Zerobaseone, which was resolved by security.
