= The Fact Music Awards =

South Korean music awards ceremony

- Official poster for the 2023 award ceremony
- Awarded for: Contributions to the Hallyu wave
- Country: South Korea
- Presented by: The Fact and Fan N Star
- First award: April 24, 2019; 7 years ago
- Website: TMA

The Fact Music Awards (Korean: 더팩트 뮤직 어워즈; abbreviated as TMA) is an awards ceremony hosted by The Fact and organized by Fan N Star that recognizes major contributors to the Hallyu wave. Established in 2019, The Fact Music Awards determines its winners through objective data from Circle Chart (formerly Gaon Music Charts), a panel of judges, and the support and participation scores of fans at home and abroad.

The awards ceremony broadcasts across Asia through multiple channels including both V Live and ABS-CBN.

The December 2020 ceremony was replaced by an online ceremony for awards in all categories in the aftermath of the COVID-19 pandemic to prevent further spread of the virus and to ensure the safety of both fans and artists.

== Ceremonies ==
Edition	Date	Venue	City	Host(s)	Ref.
1st	April 24, 2019	Namdong Gymnasium	Incheon, South Korea	Jun Hyun-moo and Seohyun	
2nd	March 16, 2020	Online Announcement			
3rd	December 12, 2020	Online Ceremony (On-tact)		Jun Hyun-moo and Seohyun	
4th	October 2, 2021	Online Ceremony (On-tact)		Seohyun, Shin Dong-yup, and Boom	
5th	October 8, 2022	KSPO Dome	Seoul, South Korea	Jun Hyun-moo and Seohyun	
6th	October 10, 2023	Namdong Gymnasium	Incheon, South Korea	Jun Hyun-moo and Seohyun	
7th	September 7–8, 2024	Kyocera Dome Osaka	Osaka, Japan	Jun Hyun-moo and Seohyun	
8th	September 20, 2025	Macao Outdoor Performance Venue	Macao, China	Jun Hyun-moo and Seohyun	
9th	September 19, 2026	Busan Asiad Main Stadium	Busan, South Korea	Jun Hyun-moo and Seohyun	

== Grand Prize (Daesang) ==
Edition	Year	Winner(s)				
1st	2018	BTS				
2nd	2019	BTS				
3rd	2020	BTS				
4th	2021	BTS				
5th	2022	BTS				
6th	2023	Seventeen				
7th	2024	aespa				
Edition	Year	Honor of the Year	Muse of the Year	Record of the Year	Sound of the Year	Icon of the Year
8th	2025	Stray Kids	aespa	Stray Kids	Ive	Enhypen
9th	2026		Riize	Cortis	Nmixx	Ateez

== Artist of the Year (Bonsang) ==
Edition	Year	Winner(s)												
1st	2018	BTS	NU'EST	Mamamoo	Monsta X	Twice	Red Velvet	Chungha	iKon	GFriend	Momoland	—	—	—
2nd	2019	BTS	NU'EST	Mamamoo	Monsta X	Twice	Red Velvet	Chungha	Super Junior	—	—	—	—	—
3rd	2020	BTS	NU'EST	Mamamoo	Monsta X	Twice	Seventeen	Kang Daniel	Super Junior	Iz*One	Hwasa	Got7	—	—
4th	2021	BTS	Stray Kids	Ateez	Itzy	Brave Girls	Seventeen	Kang Daniel	Super Junior	Oh My Girl	The Boyz	TXT	Astro	Enhypen
5th	2022	BTS	Stray Kids	Ateez	Itzy	Lim Young-woong	Psy	Kang Daniel	Treasure	Ive	The Boyz	TXT	NCT Dream	(G)I-dle
6th	2023	NewJeans	Stray Kids	Ateez	Itzy	Lim Young-woong	Seventeen	aespa	Treasure	Ive	Nmixx	—	—	—
7th	2024	NewJeans	NiziU	TWS	Itzy	Kim Jae Joong	JO1	aespa	—	—	—	—	—	—
8th	2025	Enhypen	Stray Kids	TWS	Zerobaseone	BoyNextDoor	NCT Wish	aespa	Nmixx	Ive	—	—	—	—
9th	2026	Cortis	Riize	Ateez	KiiiKiii	Illit	Rescene	Treasure	Nmixx	AllDay Project	Alpha Drive One	Yena	—	—

== Best Performer Award ==
Edition	Year	Winner(s)		
1st	2018	Mamamoo	Monsta X	—
2nd	2019	(G)I-dle	Stray Kids	The Boyz
3rd	2020	Itzy	Jessi	TXT
4th	2021	Seventeen	—	—
5th	2022	Ateez	NCT Dream	—
6th	2023	Kwon Eun-bi	Ive	Jannabi
7th	2024	Itzy	NewJeans	—
8th	2025	Zerobaseone	—	—
9th	2026	Treasure	—	—

== Next Leader Award ==
Edition	Year	Winner(s)		
1st	2018	(G)I-dle	Stray Kids	The Boyz
2nd	2019	Itzy	TXT	—
3rd	2020	Cravity	Enhypen	Weeekly
4th	2021	STAYC	—	—
5th	2022	Ive	Le Sserafim	NewJeans
6th	2023	Zerobaseone	Riize	—
7th	2024	TWS	NCT Wish	—
8th	2025	KiiiKiii	Hearts2Hearts	AllDay Project
9th	2026	Alpha Drive One	Cortis	

== Worldwide Icon Award ==
Edition	Year	Winner(s)	
1st	2018	Red Velvet	Twice
2nd	2019	Super Junior	—
3rd	2020	BTS	Seventeen
4th	2021	Super Junior	—
5th	2022	NCT Dream	—
6th	2023	aespa	—
7th	2024	NewJeans	—

== Popularity Award ==
Edition	Year	Winner
1st	2018	BTS
2nd	2019	BTS
3rd	2020	Super Junior
4th	2021	BTS
5th	2022	BTS
6th	2023	Jimin
7th	2024	JO1
8th	2025	Stray Kids
9th	2026	Lim Young Woong

== Listener's Choice Award ==
Edition	Year	Winner
2nd	2019	BTS
3rd	2020	BTS
4th	2021	BTS
5th	2022	NCT Dream
6th	2023	NewJeans
7th	2024	aespa
8th	2025	aespa
9th	2026	Rescene

== Global Hot-Trend Award ==
Edition	Year	Winner(s)			
3rd	2020	Ateez	(G)I-dle	Stray Kids	The Boyz
4th	2021	Cravity	Weeekly	—	—
5th	2022	TNX	Kep1er	—	—
6th	2023	BoyNextDoor	Xikers	—	—
7th	2024	Evnne	Xikers	n.SSign	Kiss of Life
8th	2025	Nexz	Meovv	—	—
9th	2026	Close Your Eyes	tripleS	—	—

== Best Music ==
Edition	Year	Spring	Summer	Fall	Winter
6th	2023	Lee Chan-won	BTS	V	Lim Young-woong
7th	2024	V	Lim Young-woong	—	Lim Young-woong
8th	2025	J-Hope	Jin	—	V
9th	2026	BTS	BTS	Plave	Lee Chan Won

== Hot Stage of the Year ==
Edition	Year	Winner(s)
5th	2022	Psy
7th	2024	Kim Jae-joong

== Other Awards ==
Edition	Year	Award	Winner(s)	
1st	2018	Best Album	BTS's Love Yourself: Answer	
1st	2018	Best Song	iKon's "Love Scenario"	
1st	2018	Fan Rising Star	A.C.E	
2nd	2019	Band Performer of the Year	IZ	
7th	2024	Hottest	Unis	Nexz
7th	2024	Hot Potential	Wooah	Young Posse
7th	2024	Global Generation Award	Kep1er	&Team
7th	2024	Musinsa Popularity Award	NewJeans	
7th	2024	Today’s Choice	TWS	Unis
8th	2025	Hottest	Close Your Eyes	AHOF
8th	2025	Today’s Choice	Enhypen	
9th	2026	Hottest	Xikers	Idid
9th	2026	Today’s Choice	Rescene	
9th	2026	World's Best Wave	Evan	

== Fan N Star Awards ==
(Determined through fan votes)

=== Fan N Star Angel N Star Award ===
Edition	Year	Winner		
5th	2022	Kim Ho-joong	Lim Young-woong	Young Tak
7th	2024	Lim Young-Woong		

=== Fan N Star Choice Award ===
Edition	Year	Winner	
Edition	Year	Group	Individual
1st	2018	Super Junior	Kang Daniel
2nd	2019	Super Junior	Kang Daniel
3rd	2020	Super Junior	Hwang Chi-yeul
4th	2021	Super Junior	Hwang Chi-yeul
5th	2022	BTS	Jin
6th	2023	BTS	Lim Young-woong
7th	2024	Plave	Lim Young-woong
8th	2025	Plave	Jin
9th	2026	BTS	Lee Chan-won

=== Fan N Star Four N Star Award ===
Edition	Year	Winner
5th	2022	Stray Kids
6th	2023	Stray Kids
7th	2024	Stray Kids

=== Fan N Star Global Award ===
Edition	Year	Winner
5th	2022	BTS

=== Fan N Star Most Votes Award ===
Edition	Year	Winner		
Edition	Year	Group	Individual	
1st	2018	Super Junior	—	Kang Daniel
2nd	2019	Super Junior	—	Kang Daniel
3rd	2020	Super Junior	—	Hwang Chi-yeul
4th	2021	BTS	Lim Young-woong	Hwang Chi-yeul
5th	2022	BTS	Lim Young-woong	Hwang Chi-yeul
6th	2023	BTS	Lim Young-woong	—

=== Fan N Star Trot Popularity Award ===
Edition	Year	Winner
3rd	2020	Lim Young-woong
4th	2021	Lim Young-woong
5th	2022	Lim Young-woong

=== Fan N Star Best Ads. Award ===
Edition	Year	Winner
3rd	2020	Lim Young-woong
4th	2021	Lim Young-woong
5th	2022	Lim Young-woong
6th	2023	Lim Young-woong

=== Fan N Star Hall of Fame Award ===
Edition	Year	Winner(s)	
Edition	Year	Group	Individual
1st	2018	Super Junior	Eunhyuk
1st	2018	NU'EST	JR
1st	2018	NU'EST	Aron
1st	2018	—	Kang Daniel
1st	2018	—	Kim Jae-joong
4th	2021	Super Junior	—

=== Fan N Star Special Award ===
Edition	Year	Winner
2nd	2019	Yang Joon-il

== Most Wins ==
Rank	Artist(s)	Awards
1	BTS	29
2	Lim Young-woong	18
3	Super Junior	15
4	Stray Kids	13
5	Kang Daniel	8
5	aespa	8
6	NewJeans	7
6	Itzy	7
6	Ateez	7
7	Seventeen	6
7	Enhypen	6
7	Ive	6
8	Hwang Chi-yeul	5
8	The Boyz	5

== General references ==
- April 24, 2019, Winners:
- March 16, 2020, Winners:
- December 12, 2020, Winners:
- October 2, 2021, Winners:
- October 8, 2022, Winners:
- October 10, 2023, Winners:
- September 20, 2025, Winners:
- September 19, 2026, Winners:
