= 33rd Seoul Music Awards =

2024 South Korean music award ceremony

- Date: January 2, 2024
- Venue: Rajamangala National Stadium
- Country: Thailand
- Hosted by: Lee Seung-gi; Tiffany Young; BamBam; Youngjae
- Website: seoulmusicawards.com

The 33rd Seoul Music Awards (Korean: 33rd 서울가요대상; RR: 33rd Seoul Gayo Daesang) is an award ceremony held on January 2, 2024. It was organized by Y Global Music and Sports Seoul. The ceremony was hosted by Lee Seung-gi, Tiffany Young, BamBam and Youngjae.

== Criteria ==
Only songs and albums released from January to December 2023 were eligible to be nominated.

== Results ==
Winners included NCT Dream (Grand Award); NewJeans (Best Song); Seventeen (Best Album); and Kim Ho-joong (Popularity Award).

Category	Online voting	Panelist	Music sales	Album sales
Main Prize (Bonsang)	25%	50%	25%	
Rookie Award	25%	50%	25%	
Popularity Award	100% (Korea Only)	N/A		
Hallyu Special Award	100% (Overseas Only)	N/A		
Trot Award	25%	50%	25%	
Ballad Award	25%	50%	25%	
OST Award	25%	50%	25%	

== Winners and nominees ==
Winners and nominees were listed in alphabetical order. Winners were listed first and emphasized in bold.

The list of nominees were announced on November 5, 2023, through the official website. Voting opened on Seoul Music Awards mobile application on November 5, 2023, and would closed on December 15, 2023.

=== Main awards ===
Grand Award (Daesang)	Main Award (Bonsang)
**NCT Dream**	**(G)I-dle**; **Aespa**; **Ive**; **Jimin**; **Jungkook**; **Kang Daniel**; **Lim Young-woong**; **NCT Dream**; **NewJeans**; **Nmixx**; **Riize**; **Seventeen**; **STAYC**; **Stray Kids**; **Sunmi**; **V**; **Young Tak**; **Zerobaseone**; List of nominated artists: AKMU; Ateez; BamBam; BSS; BtoB; Chaeyeon; Choi Ye-na; D.O.; Enhypen; Exo; Fifty Fifty; Itzy; J-Hope; Jeon Somi; Jihyo; Jisoo; Kai; Kep1er; Key; Kim Ho-joong; Le Sserafim; Lee Chan-won; Monsta X; NCT; NCT 127; NCT DoJaeJung; ONF; Shinee; Shownu X Hyungwon; Taeyang; Taeyong; The Boyz; Tomorrow X Together; Treasure; Twice; Yunho
Best Song Award	Best Album Award
**NewJeans – "OMG"**	**Seventeen – FML**
Rookie Award	Best Performance
**Riize**; **Zerobaseone**; 8Turn; BoyNextDoor; El7z Up; Evnne; Fantasy Boys; Jang Ye-eun; Kiss of Life; N.SSign; Pow; Plave; The Wind; TIOT; Xikers; Young Posse	**Billlie**
Popularity Award	Hallyu Special Award
**Kim Ho-joong**; List of nominated artists: (G)I-dle; Aespa; AKMU; Ateez; BamBam; BSS; BtoB; Chaeyeon; Choi Ye-na; D.O.; Enhypen; Exo; Fifty Fifty; H1-Key; Itzy; Ive; J-Hope; Jeon Somi; Jihyo; Jimin; Jisoo; Jungkook; Kai; Kang Daniel; Kep1er; Key; Le Sserafim; Lee Chan-won; Lim Young-woong; Monsta X; NCT; NCT 127; NCT DoJaeJung; NCT Dream; NewJeans; Nmixx; ONF; Riize; Seventeen; Shinee; Shownu X Hyungwon; STAYC; Stray Kids; Sunmi; Taeyang; Taeyong; The Boyz; Tomorrow X Together; Treasure; Twice; V; Young Tak; Yunho; Zerobaseone	**Kim Ho-joong**; List of nominated artists: (G)I-dle; Aespa; AKMU; Ateez; BamBam; BSS; BtoB; Chaeyeon; Choi Ye-na; D.O.; Enhypen; Exo; Fifty Fifty; H1-Key; Itzy; Ive; J-Hope; Jeon Somi; Jihyo; Jimin; Jisoo; Jungkook; Kai; Kang Daniel; Kep1er; Key; Le Sserafim; Lee Chan-won; Lim Young-woong; Monsta X; NCT; NCT 127; NCT DoJaeJung; NCT Dream; NewJeans; Nmixx; ONF; Riize; Seventeen; Shinee; Shownu X Hyungwon; STAYC; Stray Kids; Sunmi; Taeyang; Taeyong; The Boyz; Tomorrow X Together; Treasure; Twice; V; Young Tak; Yunho; Zerobaseone

=== Genre-based awards ===
Trot Award	Ballad Award
**Young Tak**; Hyun Sook; Jang Minho; Jin Sung; Jung Dong-won; Kim Ho-joong; Lee Chan-won; Lim Young-woong; Na Hoon-a; Nam Jin; Park Seo-jin; Song Ga-in; Tae Jin-ah	**Young K**; Choi Yu-ree; DK; Huh Gak; Roy Kim; Kassy; Lim Han-byul; Miyeon; Park Jae-jung; Sung Si-kyung; The Cross; Tophyun; Woodz; Zia
OST Award	R&B Hiphop Award
**Baekhyun**; Big Naughty; Colde; Cravity; Ha Hyun-woo; Hen; Itzy; Jeon Woong & Lee Dae-hwi; Jung Seung-hwan; Kim Min-seok; Kim Ye-ji; Lim Ha-young; Lim Jae-hyeon; MeloMance; Miyeon; Rothy	**Dynamic Duo**

=== Other awards ===
New Wave Star	World Best Artist
**Kiss of Life**; **Plave**; **Yuju**	**Blackpink**
Discovery of the Year	Band Award
**Fifty Fifty**	**Xdinary Heroes**
K-pop Special Award	Lifetime Achievement Award
**Sandara Park**	**Kim Soo-chul**; **Nam Jin**
Y Global Special Award	Fan Choice of the Year
**n.SSign**	**V – Layover**
Thai Best Artist	World Trend Artist
**Zee Pruk and Nunew**; **Gemini and Fourth**	**BTS**
Global Producer Award
**BamBam**; **Mark Tuan**; **Youngjae**

== Performers ==
The first to third sets of lineup consisting BamBam, Kang Daniel, Kiss of Life, NCT Dream, Nmixx, Riize, Sandara Park, STAYC, Tiffany Young, Youngjae, Young Tak, and Zerobaseone were announced on November 6, 2023.

Order of the performance, name of the artist(s), and song(s) they performed
Order	Artist(s)	Song performed
1	Billlie	"S-Class" (cover)
1	Kiss of Life	"Guilty" (cover)
1	Jam Republic	"Eve, Psyche & the Bluebeard's Wife" (cover)
1	Billlie, Kiss of Life and Jam Republic	"Seven" (cover)
2	n.SSign	"Wormhole" + "Hard Carry" (cover)
3	Nunew	"Eh!" + "True Love"
4	Gemini and Fourth	"You're Blushing"
5	Kiss of Life	Intro + "Sugarcoat" (Natty solo) + "Bad News"
6	Billlie	Intro + "Eunoia" + "Dang! (hocus pocus)"
7	Yuju	"Peach Blossom" + "Dalala"
8	Zerobaseone	Intro + "In Bloom" + "Crush"
9	Xdinary Heroes	Intro + "Freakin' Bad" + "Break the Brake"
10	Young Tak	Intro + "Form" + "Jjiniya"
11	Nmixx	"Soñar (Breaker)" + "Love Me Like This"
12	Riize	Intro + "Talk Sexy" + "Get a Guitar"
13	Sandara Park	Intro + "Festival" + "I Am the Best"
14	Dynamic Duo	"AEAO" + "Gilmak" + "Smoke"
15	BamBam	Intro + "Pandora" + "Sour & Sweet" + "Ribbon"
16	Youngjae	Intro + "Do It" + "Vibin"
17	STAYC	Poppy + "Teddy Bear"
18	Kang Daniel	Intro + "SOS" + "Ready to Ride"
19	Young K	Intro + "Nothing But" + "Time of Our Life"
20	Sunmi	Intro + "Stranger" + "Gashina"
21	NCT Dream	Intro + "Broken Melodies" + "Hot Sauce" (SMA version) + "ISTJ" (Encore stage)
