= Plave =

South Korean virtual boy band

- Plave in 2025; L–R: Yejun, Eunho, Noah, Bamby, and Hamin

Background information
- Origin: Seoul, South Korea
- Genre: K-pop
- Years active: 2023–present
- Labels: Vlast; Polydor/Universal Japan
- Members: Yejun; Noah; Bamby; Eunho; Hamin
- Website: Official website

YouTube information
- Channel: PLAVE 플레이브
- Years active: 2022–present
- Subscribers: 1.22 Million
- Views: 958 Million
- Last updated: November 2026

Plave (Korean: 플레이브; stylized in all caps) is a South Korean virtual boy band formed by Vlast. The group consists of five members: Yejun, Noah, Bamby, Eunho, and Hamin.

== History ==
=== 2022–2023: Introduction and official debut ===
Plave was introduced through a live broadcast on its official YouTube and Twitch on September 15, 2022. The group's name is a combination of "play" and "rêve" (French for 'dream'). Plave made their official debut on March 12, 2023, with the release of their first single album, Asterum. Asterum is described in Plave's worldview as a mysterious space between Caelum and Terra, where they meet their fans.

During their livestream on December 12, 2023, the members announced that they would be joining Weverse. They subsequently launched their official fan club membership on Weverse at the start of 2024. Plave is the first virtual group to join the platform.

=== 2024–present: First anniversary and fan concert ===
On February 26, 2024, their second mini album, Asterum: 134-1, was released, which sold 221,151 physical albums on opening day and 569,289 copies in one week, a new record for the group. Their title track "Way 4 Luv" won first place on two Korean weekly music shows, Show Champion, and Show! Music Core, making them the first virtual idol group to win on a Korean music show.

The group held their first fan concert, "Hello, Asterum!", on April 13–14, 2024 at the Olympic Hall in Seoul.

In April 2024, Vlast CEO Lee Sung-gu announced that the company had received equity investments from HYBE and YG Plus to support international expansion. In November 2024, Plave performed at the Mnet Asian Music Awards, the first virtual idol group to appear at the ceremony.

On February 3, 2025, Plave released their third mini album, Caligo Pt.1, with the lead single "Dash". The album sold over one million copies in its first week, making Plave the first virtual idol group and the first boy group of 2025 to reach million-seller status with a single release. "Dash" debuted at number 195 on the Billboard Global 200.

== Members ==
- Yejun (예준) – leader, vocalist, producer
- Noah (노아) – vocalist, producer
- Hamin (하민) – rapper, dancer, choreographer
- Eunho (은호) – rapper, vocalist, producer
- Bamby (밤비) – vocalist, dancer, choreographer

== Discography ==
=== Extended plays ===
Title	Details	Peak chart positions						Sales	Certifications
Title	Details	KOR	JPN	JPN Hot	US	US Indie	US World	Sales	Certifications
Asterum: The Shape of Things to Come	Released: August 24, 2023; Label: Vlast; Format: CD, digital download, streaming	2	—	—	—	—	—	KOR: 356,690	KMCA: Platinum
Asterum: 134-1	Released: February 26, 2024; Label: Vlast; Format: CD, digital download, streaming	1	9	—	—	—	—	KOR: 834,307; JPN: 10,541	KMCA: 2× Platinum; KMCA: Platinum (Poca)
Caligo Pt.1	Released: February 3, 2025; Label: Vlast; Format: CD, digital download, streaming	2	5	9	—	—	—	KOR: 1,201,887; JPN: 27,344	KMCA: 3× Platinum; KMCA: Platinum (Poca); RIAJ: Gold (phy.)
Caligo Pt.2	Released: April 13, 2026; Label: Vlast; Format: CD, digital download, streaming	2	3	8	145	21	2	KOR: 1,142,510; JPN: 27,688	KMCA: 3× Platinum; KMCA: 2× Platinum (Poca); RIAJ: Gold (phy.)
Hyperdrive	Released: October 13, 2026; Label: Vlast; Format: CD, digital download, streaming	2	2	4	31	4	1	KOR: 1,127,900; JPN: 51,376	RIAJ: Gold (phy.)
"—" denotes releases that did not chart or were not released in that region.

=== Single albums ===
Title	Details	Peak chart positions	Sales	Certifications
Title	Details	KOR	Sales	Certifications
Asterum	Released: March 12, 2023; Label: Vlast; Formats: CD, digital download, streaming	10	KOR: 262,063	KMCA: Platinum (Poca)
Plbbuu	Released: November 10, 2025; Label: Vlast; Formats: CD, digital download, streaming	1	KOR: 1,263,185	KMCA: Platinum; KMCA: 3× Platinum (Poca)

=== Singles ===
==== Korean singles ====
List of Korean singles, showing year released, chart positions, and album name
Title	Year	Peak chart positions				Album
Title	Year	KOR	KOR Hot	TWN	WW	Album
"Wait for You" (기다릴게)	2023	— (Note: "Wait for You" did not enter the Circle Digital Chart, but it peaked at number 39 on the component Circle Download Chart.)	—	—	—	Asterum
"Why?" (왜요 왜요 왜?)	2023	87	—	—	—	Asterum: The Shape of Things to Come
"The 6th Summer" (여섯 번째 여름)	2023	69	—	—	—	Asterum: The Shape of Things to Come
"Merry Pllistmas"	2023	6	54	—	—	Asterum: 134-1
"Way 4 Luv"	2024	6	—	—	— (Note: "Way 4 Luv" did not enter the Billboard Global 200, but peaked at number 196 on the Global Excl. US.)	Asterum: 134-1
"Pump Up the Volume!"	2024	1	—	—	— (Note: "Pump Up the Volume!" did not enter the Billboard Global 200, but peaked at number 143 on the Global Excl. US.)	Caligo Pt.1
"Dash"	2025	3	6	—	195	Caligo Pt.1
"Hide and Seek" (숨바꼭질)	2025	35	5	—	— (Note: "Hide and Seek" did not enter the Billboard Global 200, but peaked at number 197 on the Global Excl. US.)	Plbbuu
"Bbuu!"	2025	47	1	—	138	Plbbuu
"Hmph!" (흥흥흥) (featuring Sole)	2026	71	—	—	172	Caligo Pt.2
"Born Savage"	2026	14	—	—	172	Caligo Pt.2
"Star Trace"	2026	2	—	2	57	Hyperdrive
"—" denotes releases that did not chart or were not released in that region.

==== Japanese singles ====
List of Japanese singles, showing year released, chart positions, certifications, and album name
Title	Year	Peak chart positions			Sales	Certifications	Album
Title	Year	KOR	JPN	JPN Hot	Sales	Certifications	Album
"Hide and Seek" (かくれんぼ)	2025	92	1	1	JPN: 232,593	RIAJ: 2× Platinum (phy.)	Non-album singles
"Flame" (featuring Milet)	2026	180	—	—			Non-album singles
"—" denotes releases that did not chart or were not released in that region.

=== Soundtrack appearances ===
List of soundtrack appearances, showing year released, chart positions, and album name
Title	Year	Peak chart positions			Album
Title	Year	KOR	KOR Hot	WW Excl. US	Album
"What If" (달랐을까)	2024	10	—	—	Dear Hyeri OST
"We Don't Stop" (멈추지 않아)	2024	55	—	—	The Fiery Priest OST
"Borrow Your Night" (이 밤을 빌려 말해요)	2025	56	5	190	Even If This Love Disappears From the World Tonight OST
"—" denotes releases that did not chart or were not released in that region.

=== Other charted songs ===
List of other charted songs, showing year released, chart positions, and album name
Title	Year	Peak chart positions				Album
Title	Year	KOR	KOR Hot	TWN	WW	Album
"Pixel World"	2023	— (Note: "Pixel World" did not enter the Circle Digital Chart, but it peaked at number 71 on the component Circle Download Chart.)	—	—	—	Asterum
"I Just Love Ya"	2023	135	—	—	—	Asterum: The Shape of Things to Come
"Dear. Plli"	2023	137	—	—	—	Asterum: The Shape of Things to Come
"Watch Me Woo!"	2024	41	—	—	—	Asterum: 134-1
"Virtual Idol" (버추얼 아이돌)	2024	47	—	—	—	Asterum: 134-1
"From"	2024	48	—	—	—	Asterum: 134-1
"Our Movie" (우리 영화)	2024	44	—	—	—	Asterum: 134-1
"Chroma Drift"	2025	14	11	—	— (Note: "Chroma Drift" did not enter the Billboard Global 200, but peaked at number 115 on the Global Excl. US.)	Caligo Pt.1
"Rizz"	2025	13	44	—	— (Note: "Rizz" did not enter the Billboard Global 200, but peaked at number 98 on the Global Excl. US.)	Caligo Pt.1
"Island"	2025	16	5	—	— (Note: "Island" did not enter the Billboard Global 200, but peaked at number 128 on the Global Excl. US.)	Caligo Pt.1
"12:32 (A to T)"	2025	17	7	—	—	Caligo Pt.1
"Rizz" (Japanese version)	2025	191	—	—	—	Non-album song
"Bongsoong-a" (봉숭아)	2025	103	4	—	—	Plbbuu
"Blossom Parade" (꽃송이들의 퍼레이드)	2026	56	—	—	— (Note: "Blossom Parade" did not enter the Billboard Global 200, but peaked at number 103 on the Global Excl. US.)	Caligo Pt.2
"Lunar Hearts"	2026	54	—	—	— (Note: "Lunar Hearts" did not enter the Billboard Global 200, but peaked at number 115 on the Global Excl. US.)	Caligo Pt.2
"Think I Am" (그런 것 같아)	2026	49	—	—	— (Note: "Think I Am" did not enter the Billboard Global 200, but peaked at number 89 on the Global Excl. US.)	Caligo Pt.2
"Ggun" (꾼)	2026	19	—	11	128	Hyperdrive
"Sweet Rain" (푸른 하늘에 단비)	2026	17	—	6	130	Hyperdrive
"The Answer Is Yes"	2026	20	—	12	160	Hyperdrive
"Rewind"	2026	22	—	14	— (Note: "Rewind" did not enter the Billboard Global 200, but peaked at number 103 on the Global Excl. US.)	Hyperdrive
"—" denotes releases that did not chart or were not released in that region.

== Concerts ==
=== Headlining ===
- Plave The 1st Fan Concert 'Hello, Asterum!' (April 13 & 14, 2024)
- Plave Fan Concert 'Hello, Asterum! Encore' (October 5 & 6, 2024)

=== Dash: Quantum Leap Tour (2025) ===
List of concerts
Date	City	Country	Venue	Ref.
August 15	Seoul	South Korea	KSPO Dome	
August 16	Seoul	South Korea	KSPO Dome	
August 17	Seoul	South Korea	KSPO Dome	
August 23	Taipei	Taiwan	NTSU Arena	
October 1	Hong Kong		AsiaWorld-Summit	
October 18	Jakarta	Indonesia	Beach City International Stadium	
October 25	Bangkok	Thailand	UOB Live	
November 1	Tokyo	Japan	Makuhari Messe Makuhari Event Hall	
November 2	Tokyo	Japan	Makuhari Messe Makuhari Event Hall	
November 20	Seoul	South Korea	Gocheok Sky Dome	
November 21	Seoul	South Korea	Gocheok Sky Dome	

=== Participation ===
- Idol Radio Live in Seoul (September 23, 2023) [Song Performed "The 6th Summer" & "Why?")
- Hanteo Music Awards 2024 (February 17, 2024) [Song Performed "The 6th Summer")
- Weverse Con 2024 (June 16, 2024) [Song Performed "Why?", "Watch Me Woo!" & "Way 4 Luv")
- Show! Music Core in Japan 2024 (June 30, 2024) [Song Performed "Way 4 Luv" & "Virtual Idol")
- Rakuten GirlsAward 2024 (October 10, 2024) [Song Performed "Watch Me Woo!" & "Wait for You"]
- MAMA 2024 (November 22, 2024) [Song Performed "Way 4 Luv"]
- MMA 2024 (November 30, 2024) [Song Performed "Way 4 Luv" & "Pump Up the Volume"]
- MBC Gayo Daejejeon 2024 (December 31, 2024) [Song Performed "Pump Up the Volume" & "Watch Me Woo"]

== Awards and nominations ==
Name of the award ceremony, year presented, award category, nominee(s) of the award, and the result of nomination
Award ceremony	Year	Category	Nominee(s)	Result	Ref.
Asia Artist Awards	2026	Popularity Award – Group (Male)	Plave	Pending	
Asia Star Entertainer Awards	2024	The Best Virtual Artist	Plave	Won	
Asia Star Entertainer Awards	2025	Best Group (Male)	Plave	Won	
Asia Star Entertainer Awards	2025	Fan Choice – 5th Generation Artist	Plave	Won	
Brand Customer Loyalty Awards	2025	Male Idol	Plave	Won	
Circle Chart Music Awards	2023	Rookie of the Year – Streaming Unique Listeners	"The 6th Summer"	Nominated	
The Fact Music Awards	2023	TMA Best Music Award – Autumn	Plave	Nominated	
The Fact Music Awards	2024	Fan N Star Choice Award	Plave	Won	
The Fact Music Awards	2025	Fan N Star Choice Award	Plave	Won	
The Fact Music Awards	2026	TMA Best Music Award – Autumn	"Hide and Seek"	Won	
Golden Disc Awards	2023	Popular Artist Award	Plave	Nominated	
Golden Disc Awards	2023	Rookie Artist of the Year	Plave	Nominated	
Golden Disc Awards	2024	Album (Bonsang)	Asterum: 134-1	Nominated	
Golden Disc Awards	2024	Most Popular Artist – Male	Plave	Won	
Golden Disc Awards	2025	Digital Song (Bonsang)	"Dash"	Nominated	
Golden Disc Awards	2025	Most Popular Artist – Male	Plave	Nominated	
Hanteo Music Awards	2023	Rookie of the Year – Male	Plave	Nominated	
Hanteo Music Awards	2023	Special Award – Virtual Artist	Plave	Won	
Hanteo Music Awards	2023	Whos Fandom Award	Plli	Nominated	
Hanteo Music Awards	2024	Artist of the Year	Plave	Won	
Hanteo Music Awards	2024	Global Artist – Africa	Plave	Nominated	
Hanteo Music Awards	2024	Global Artist – Asia	Plave	Won	
Hanteo Music Awards	2024	Global Artist – Europe	Plave	Nominated	
Hanteo Music Awards	2024	Global Artist – North America	Plave	Nominated	
Hanteo Music Awards	2024	Global Artist – Oceania	Plave	Nominated	
Hanteo Music Awards	2024	Global Artist – South America	Plave	Nominated	
Hanteo Music Awards	2024	WhosFandom Award – Male	Plli	Nominated	
Hanteo Music Awards	2025	Artist of the Year	Plave	Won	
Hanteo Music Awards	2025	Best Global Popular Artist	Plave	Nominated	
Hanteo Music Awards	2025	Best Popular Artist	Plave	Nominated	
Hanteo Music Awards	2025	Global Artist – Africa	Plave	Nominated	
Hanteo Music Awards	2025	Global Artist – Asia	Plave	Nominated	
Hanteo Music Awards	2025	Global Artist – Europe	Plave	Nominated	
Hanteo Music Awards	2025	Global Artist – North America	Plave	Nominated	
Hanteo Music Awards	2025	Global Artist – Oceania	Plave	Nominated	
Hanteo Music Awards	2025	Global Artist – South America	Plave	Nominated	
Hanteo Music Awards	2025	Special Award – Virtual	Plave	Won	
Hanteo Music Awards	2025	WhosFandom Award	Plli	Nominated	
MAMA Awards	2024	Best Vocal Performance – Group	"Way 4 Luv"	Nominated	
MAMA Awards	2024	Song of the Year	"Way 4 Luv"	Nominated	
MAMA Awards	2024	Fans' Choice Top 10 – Male	Plave	Nominated	
MAMA Awards	2025	Album of the Year	Caligo Pt.1	Nominated	
MAMA Awards	2025	Best Dance Performance – Male Group	"Dash"	Nominated	
MAMA Awards	2025	Fans' Choice of the Year	Plave	Nominated	
MAMA Awards	2025	Fans' Choice Top 10 – Male	Plave	Nominated	
MAMA Awards	2025	Song of the Year	"Dash"	Nominated	
Melon Music Awards	2023	My Idol My Award: Best Alien Award	Plave	Won	
Melon Music Awards	2023	Millions Top 10	Plave	Nominated	
Melon Music Awards	2023	Rookie of the Year	Plave	Nominated	
Melon Music Awards	2024	Album of the Year	Asterum: 134-1	Nominated	
Melon Music Awards	2024	Artist of the Year	Plave	Nominated	
Melon Music Awards	2024	Best Male Group	Plave	Nominated	
Melon Music Awards	2024	Millions Top 10	Asterum: 134-1	Won	
Melon Music Awards	2024	Top 10 Artist	Plave	Won	
Melon Music Awards	2025	Berriz Global Fan's Choice	Plave	Nominated	
Melon Music Awards	2025	Top 10 Artist	Plave	Won	
Melon Music Awards	2025	Millions Top 10	Caligo Pt. 1	Won	
Melon Music Awards	2025	Album of the Year	Caligo Pt. 1	Nominated	
Melon Music Awards	2025	Artist of the Year	Plave	Nominated	
Mubeat Global Choice	2023	Mubeat Global Choice (Male)	Plave	Nominated	
Music Awards Japan	2025	Best Song Asia (South Korea)	"Way 4 Luv"	Nominated	
Music Awards Japan	2025	Best of Listeners' Choice: International Song	"Way 4 Luv"	Nominated	
Newsis K-Expo Cultural Awards	2026	Global Fan Choice Award	Plave	Won	
Seoul Music Awards	2023	New Wave Star Award	Plave	Won	
Seoul Music Awards	2023	Rookie Award	Plave	Nominated	
Seoul Music Awards	2024	Main Prize (Bonsang)	Plave	Won	
Seoul Music Awards	2024	Grand Prize (Daesang)	Plave	Nominated	
Seoul Music Awards	2024	Popularity Award	Plave	Nominated	
Seoul Music Awards	2024	K-Wave Special Award	Plave	Nominated	
Seoul Music Awards	2024	K-pop World Choice – Group	Plave	Nominated	
Seoul Music Awards	2024	Ballad Award	Plave	Nominated	
Seoul Music Awards	2024	OST Award	"We Don't Stop"	Nominated	
TMElive International Music Awards	2026	The Hottest Performance	Plave	Won	
Universal Superstar Awards	2024	Universal Super Rookie	Plave	Won	
