= 8Turn =

South Korean boy band

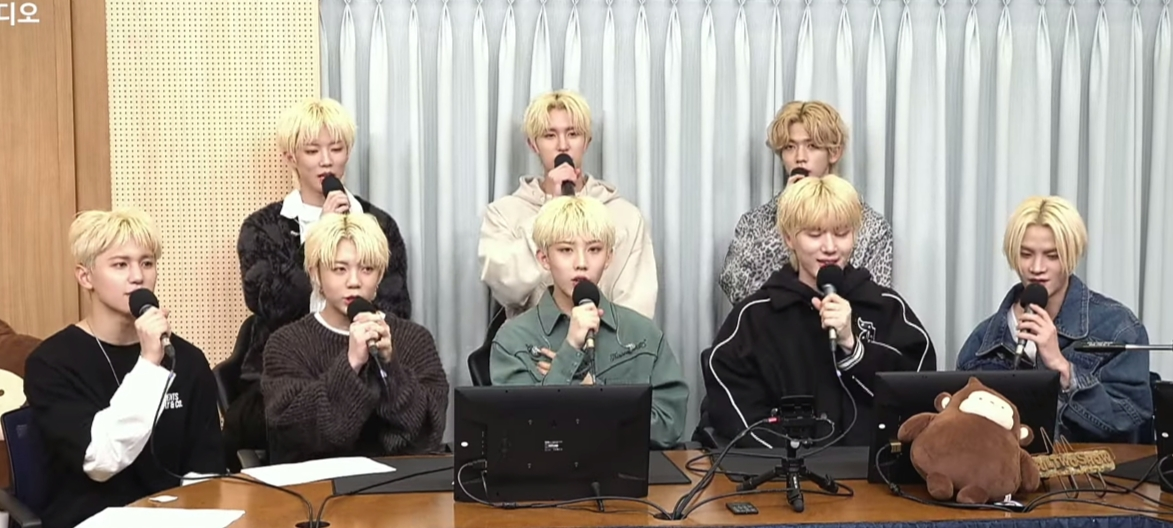
- 8Turn in January 2024; Top Row: Minho, Kyungmin, Haemin; Bottom Row: Jaeyun, Seungheon, Yungyu, Yoonsung, Myungho

Background information
- Origin: Seoul, South Korea
- Genres: K-pop
- Years active: 2023–present
- Label: MNH
- Members: Myungho; Jaeyun; Minho; Yoonsung; Haemin; Kyungmin; Yungyu; Seungheon

8Turn (Korean: 에잇턴; stylized in all caps) is a South Korean boy band formed by MNH Entertainment. The group consists of eight members: Myungho, Jaeyun, Minho, Yoonsung, Haemin, Kyungmin, Yungyu, and Seungheon. They debuted on January 30, 2023, with the extended play (EP) 8Turnrise.

== History ==
=== Pre-debut ===
Jaeyun was a contestant on Mnet's survival show Boys24 under the name Alex Moon. However, he was eliminated in episode 8. He later joined Liveworks Company and participated in the JTBC's survival reality series Mix Nine. He was eliminated in episode 10 after ranking 50th place.

Kyungmin was a contestant on Mnet's survival show I-Land. He was eliminated in the first part of the show.

=== 2023–present: Debut with 8TurnRise, Uncharted Drift and Stunning ===
On January 2, 2023, MNH Entertainment announced the official debut of their first boy group by posting a logo motion video along with the opening of the official social media account of '8Turn'. The next day, 8Turn announced the release of their first extended play, 8Turnrise. It was released digitally on January 30, 2023 and physically on February 6, 2023.

On June 26, 8Turn released their second extended play Uncharted Drift, with their title track "Excel".

== Members ==
- Myungho (명호)
- Jaeyun (재윤) – leader
- Minho (민호)
- Yoonsung (윤성)
- Haemin (해민)
- Kyungmin (경민)
- Yungyu (윤규)
- Seungheon (승헌)

== Discography ==
=== Extended plays ===
Title	Details	Peak chart positions	Sales
Title	Details	KOR	Sales
8Turnrise	Released: January 30, 2023; Label: MNH Entertainment; Formats: CD, digital download, streaming; Track listing: 1. "We"; 2. "Tic Tac"; 3. "Wonder"; 4. "Say My Name"; 5. "Heartache"	13	KOR: 45,794
Uncharted Drift	Released: June 26, 2023; Label: MNH Entertainment; Formats: CD, digital download, streaming; Track listing: 1. "World"; 2. "Excel"; 3. "Walk It Out"; 4. "Sketch"; 5. "Ing"	18	KOR: 49,823
Stunning	Released: January 9, 2024; Label: MNH Entertainment; Formats: CD, digital download, streaming; Track listing: 1. "The Game"; 2. "Ru-Pum Pum"; 3. "Nom"; 4. "We Here"; 5. "Glow"	3	KOR: 124,167

=== Single albums ===
Title	Details	Peak chart positions	Sales
Title	Details	KOR	Sales
Leggo	Released: March 4, 2025; Label: MNH Entertainment; Formats: CD, digital download, streaming; Track listing: 1. "Leggo"; 2. "I Want You Now"	6	KOR: 48,823
Electric Heart: Born to Glow (Electric Heart: 찬란하게 빛날)	Released: August 21, 2025; Label: MNH Entertainment; Formats: CD, digital download, streaming; Track listing: 1. "Electric Heart"; 2. "Close to Me"	6	KOR: 49,347
8.X	Released: July 21, 2026; Label: MNH Entertainment; Formats: CD, digital download, streaming	4	KOR: 69,329

=== Singles ===
Title	Year	Peak chart position	Album
Title	Year	KOR Down.	Album
"Tic Tac"	2023	126	8Turnrise
"Excel"	2023	156	Uncharted Drift
"Ru-Pum Pum"	2024	—	Stunning
"Like a Friend"	2024	—	Non-album singles
"Leggo"	2025	176	Leggo
"Electric Heart"	2025	—	Electric Heart: Born to Glow
"Bruise"	2026	90	Non-album single
"Stagefright"	2026	121	8.X

=== Other charted songs ===
List of singles, showing year released, chart positions, and album name
Title	Year	Peak chart positions	Album
Title	Year	KOR Down.	Album
"Say My Name"	2023	191	8Turnrise
"Wonder"	2023	196	8Turnrise
"Heartache"	2023	198	8Turnrise
"We"	2023	199	8Turnrise

== Videography ==
=== Music videos ===
Title	Year	Director	Ref.
"Tic Tac"	2023	Paradox Child	
"WE" (Performance Video)	2023	Swisher	
"Excel"	2023	Swisher	
"Ru-Pum Pum"	2024	Hong Juyeon (HIGHQUALITYFISH)	—N/a

== Awards and nominations ==
Name of the award ceremony, year presented, award category, nominee(s) of the award, and the result of the nomination
Award ceremony	Year	Category	Nominee / work	Result	Ref.
Hanteo Music Awards	2023	Rookie of the Year – Male	8Turn	Nominated	
Hanteo Music Awards	2023	Blooming Performance Group	8Turn	Won	
MAMA Awards	2024	Fans' Choice Top 10 – Male	8Turn	Nominated	
Seoul Music Awards	2023	Rookie of the Year	8Turn	Nominated	
