= KIMPRO =

South Korean YouTube channel

YouTube information
- Channel: 김프로KIMPRO
- Years active: 2017–present
- Genres: Comedy; mukbang; memes; challenges; situational plays
- Subscribers: 135.4 million
- Views: 156.5 billion
- Last updated: 6 Nov 2026

KIMPRO (Korean: 김프로) is a South Korean YouTube channel run by cousins Kim Dong Joon and Yu Baek Hap.

== History ==
KIMPRO started its channel on 11 November 2017; the channel's first video was uploaded in August 2022. In 2023, Yoo Ha-young and Jung Hee-rim joined KIMPRO, founding the group "OK TEAM." In January 2025, it became the number one monthly-viewed YouTube channel worldwide. On 18 April 2025, KIMPRO became the first South Korean YouTube channel to reach 100 million subscribers, surpassing Blackpink to become the most-subscribed channel in South Korea. KIMPRO reached 10 billion monthly views on 29 July 2025.

== Style ==
KIMPRO's style has been regarded as comedy skits, mukbangs, memes, challenges, and situational plays.

== See also ==
- List of most-subscribed YouTube channels
- List of most-viewed YouTube channels
