= N.SSign =

South Korean boy band

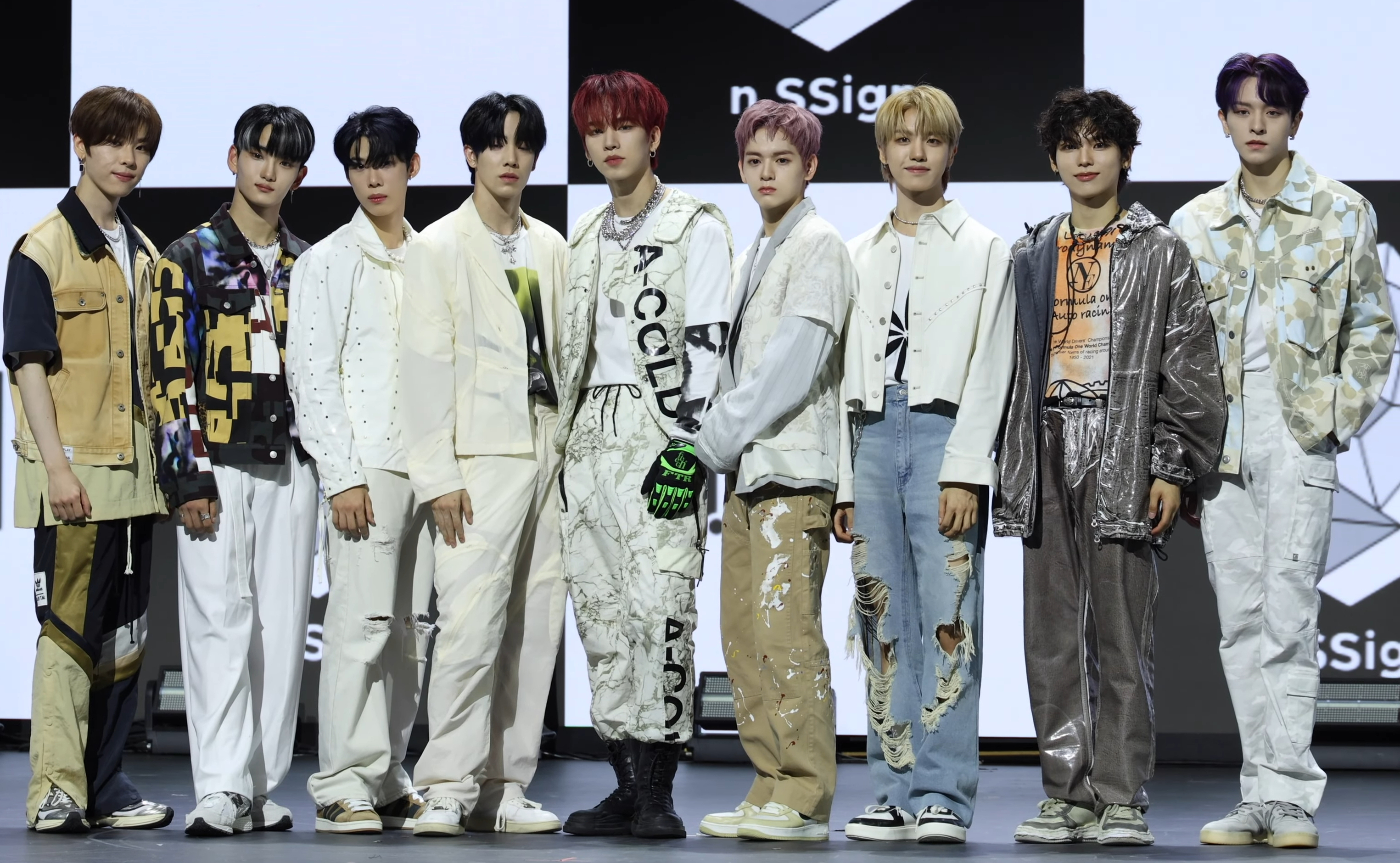
- N.SSign in August 2023; From left to right: Eddie, Junhyeok, Robin, Kazuta, Hanjun, Sangyun, Huiwon, Doha, and Laurence

Background information
- Origin: Seoul, South Korea
- Genres: K-pop
- Years active: 2023–present
- Label: n.CH
- Members: Kazuta; Doha; Sungyun; Robin; Hanjun; Laurence; Huiwon
- Past members: Hyun; Eddie; Junhyeok
- Website: nssignworld.com

N.SSign (Korean: 엔싸인; RR: Enssain; stylized as n.SSign) is a South Korean boy band formed through Channel A's reality competition Stars Awakening in 2022 and managed by n.CH Entertainment. They debuted on August 9, 2023, with the extended play (EP) Birth of Cosmo. The group consists of 7 members: Kazuta, Doha, Sungyun, Robin, Hanjun, Laurence, and Huiwon. Originally a 10-member group, Hyun, Eddie and Junhyeok left the group in 2024 due to health reason.

== Career ==
=== Pre-debut and formation through Stars Awakening ===
Before appearing on the program, several members had already been active in the entertainment industry. In 2018, Doha competed in the survival reality show Under Nineteen. Junhyeok is a member of the boy group Withus. In 2019, Robin competed in the survival reality show World Klass. However, he didn't make it into the final lineup. In 2020, Robin and Hanjun competed in the survival reality show Cap-Teen. They didn't made it to the cut. In 2021, Huiwon competed in the survival reality show Loud. He didn't made it to the first round.

On January 2, 2023, N.SSign released a special single album titled Woo Woo, containing the lead track of the same name and the track "Have All Except You". On April 18, the group released a pre-debut EP titled Salty, along with the lead track of the same name. A reissue of the EP titled Monologue was released on May 27, along with the lead track of the same name.

=== 2023–present: Debut with Birth of Cosmo, Happy & and Tiger ===
On August 9, 2023, N.SSign debuted with the EP Birth of Cosmo, along with its lead track "Wormhole". A pre-release single "Higher" was released nine days prior on July 31. On October 9, member Doha was announced to be on temporary hiatus for health reasons. The group held their first Japanese concert titled Birth of Cosmo on November 11 and 12 at Ariake Arena in Tokyo, which also marks member Doha's return to the group. On November 29, the group released their first Japanese single "New Star", which also features the Japanese version of "Wormhole" and "Higher".

On February 15, 2024, N.SSign released their second EP Happy &, along with its three title tracks "Happy &", "Funk Jam", and "Love, Love, Love Love Love!". On June 24, member Eddie was announced to be on hiatus. A reissue of Happy &, titled Tiger, was released on July 18, 2024, along with the title track of the same name. On August 5, member Hyun was announced to have departed from the group. On December 8, n.CH Entertainment announced that Eddie and Junhyeok have left the group and their contract with the agency was terminated. On December 30, N.SSign released their third EP Love Potion.

== Members ==
Active

- Kazuta (카즈타)
- Doha (도하)
- Sungyun (성윤)
- Robin (로빈)
- Hanjun (한준)
- Laurence (로렌스)
- Huiwon (희원)

Former

- Hyun (현)
- Eddie (에디)
- Junhyeok (준혁)

== Discography ==
Extended plays

- Salty (2023)
- Birth of Cosmo (2023)
- Happy & (2024)
- Love Potion (2024)
- 迷走路 -Way Out- (2026)

== Concerts and tours ==
=== Birth of Cosmo ===
Date (2023)	City	Country	Venue	Attendance
November 11	Tokyo	Japan	Ariake Arena	24,000
November 12	Tokyo	Japan	Ariake Arena	24,000

== Awards and nominations ==
Name of the award ceremony, year presented, award category, nominee(s) of the award, and the result of the nomination
Award ceremony	Year	Category	Nominee(s)/work(s)	Result	Ref.
Golden Disc Awards	2023	Rookie of the Year	N.SSign	Nominated	
Hanteo Music Awards	2023	Rookie of the Year – Male	N.SSign	Nominated	
Seoul Music Awards	2023	Y Global Special Award	N.SSign	Won	
Seoul Music Awards	2023	Rookie of the Year	N.SSign	Nominated	
Universal Superstar Awards	2024	Universal Hot Focus	N.SSign	Won	
