= Hanteo Music Awards =

South Korea Annual Music Award

- Current: 33rd Hanteo Music Awards
- Country: South Korea
- Presented by: Hanteo Global Inc.
- First award: 2021 (online); February 15, 2022; 4 years ago (live)
- Website: awards.hanteo.com

The Hanteo Music Awards (Korean: 한터뮤직어워즈, formerly named the Hanteo Awards before 2021) is a music awards show which is held annually presented by Hanteo Global Inc.. The winners were selected based on various indices, such as Physical Album, Digital Music, Social, Media, Global Authentication, Portal, and Fandom that made a big impact on the music industry in the course of the year.

The first ceremony was held online for awards in all categories in the aftermath of the COVID-19 pandemic to prevent further spread of the virus and to ensure the safety of both fans and artists. In 2022, Hanteo Global hosted its very first in-person awards show in honor of the chart's 30th anniversary.

== Ceremonies ==
Edition	Year	Date of ceremony	City	Venue	Hosts	Ref.
29th	2021	December 20, 2021	Online Ceremony			
29th	2021	December 27, 2021	Online Ceremony			
29th	2021	January 3, 2022	Online Ceremony			
29th	2021	January 7, 2022	Online Ceremony			
29th	2021	January 10, 2022	Online Ceremony			
30th	2022	February 10–11, 2023	Seoul	Jamsil Arena	Eugene, Shin Dong-yup, Hyunsuk and Baekseung	
31st	2023	February 17–18, 2024	Seoul	Dongdaemun Design Plaza	Changmin	
32nd	2024	February 15–16, 2025	Seoul	Jangchung Arena	Jinyoung and Miyeon	
33rd	2025	February 15, 2026	Seoul	KSPO Dome	Lee Chan-won and Tiffany Young	

== Criteria ==
The table below shows the score composition.

Final Score Composition
Category	Hanteo Global score	Global voting score	Judging score
Best Artist (Daesang)	50%	20%	30%
Best Album (Daesang)	50%	20%	30%
Best Song (Daesang)	50%	20%	30%
Best Performance (Daesang)	50%	20%	30%
Artist of the Year (Bonsang)	40%	30%	30%
Global Artist Award	50%	50%	—N/a
Post Generation Award	40%	30%	30%
Emerging Artist Award	40%	30%	30%
Rookie of the Year Award	40%	30%	30%
WhosFandom Award	—N/a	100%	—N/a
Special Award	30%	40%	30%
Trend Award	30%	—N/a	70%

Voting for the four Daesang categories will not be separately conducted, but the voting score will be reflected based on the results of the 'Artist of the Year Awards' voting.

Previous criteria

The table below shows the score composition.

Final Score Composition
Total score	Voting score
35% Physical Album Score; 10% Digital Music Score; 5% Social & Portal Score; 5% Broadcast & Media Score; 5% Star Score; 5% Global Authentication Score	35% Global Voting Score

- Final Score Composition: 65% Total Score + 35% Global Fandom Voting
- Total score consists of Physical Album, Digital Music, Media, Global Authentication, Portal, and Fandom indices.
- Special Award criteria: 100% based Global Fan Voting
- Initial Chodong Record Award criteria: 100% first-week album sales of a release.
- Sub-category: Initial Chodong Record Award Top 10, Male Group Top 3, Female Group Top 3, Male Solo Top 3, Female Solo Top 3, a Male Rookie Award, and a Female Rookie Award.

== Categories ==
- Best Artist (Daesang) is given to the artist who demonstrated the greatest impact on the music industry.
- Best Album (Daesang) is given to the album which demonstrated the greatest impact on the music industry.
- Best Song (Daesang) is given to the song which demonstrated the greatest impact on the music industry.
- Best Performance (Daesang) is given to the artist who demonstrated the performance that had a great impact on the music industry.
- Artist of the Year (Bonsang) is the representative of the year who achieved good results in various indicators, such as physical records, digital music, social, media, global, portal, and fandom, and was also selected by global fandom.
- Global Artist Award is given to selected artists that were loved by fans from outside of Korea and all over the world for their outstanding performances overseas. Through comprehensive global indicators, awards are given for each continent, including Asia, Europe, Africa, Oceania, North America, and South America.
- Post Generation Award is given to artists who are expected to actively promote in the future from their achievements and growth in various fields this year and the leaders of K-pop's next generation.
- Emerging Artist Award is given to artists with potential considering their achievements in various fields this year. It sends support to the artists who will grow and create a bright future.
- Rookie of the Year Award is given to the new artist who debuted and is expected to actively promote in the future.
- Special Award is an award given to several artists who promote in special genres and areas with physical albums, digital music and social media.
- Trend Award is given to artists who led the trend of K-pop this year, suggested a new turning point with their music or promotion and worthy of focus in the future.
- WhosFandom Award is an award given to both the artist and their fandom based on 100% fan votes.
Previous categories
- Initial Chodong Record Award is given to the artists who recorded top 10 in first-week sales of a release in that year. It is awarded based on the album sales data that were automatically counted from more than 1,200 K-pop album stores in both South Korea and international.
- Artist Award is an award given to artists who have had a huge influence in the music industry during the course of the year.
- Rookie Award is given in honor for new artist (debut date until their second year of debuting) with the most achievements in the music industry during the course of the year.

== Initial Chodong Record Award ==
Year	Winners										Ref.
2021	BTS	Seventeen	NCT Dream	NCT 127	EXO	Baekhyun	Enhypen	Lisa	Ateez	Stray Kids	

== Artist Award ==
=== Solo ===
Year	Winner(s)						Ref.
Year	Male Solo			Female Solo			Ref.
2021	Baekhyun	D.O.	Wonho	Lisa	Rosé	IU	

=== Group ===
Year	Winner(s)						Ref.
Year	Male Group			Female Group			Ref.
2021	BTS	Stray Kids	NCT Dream	Twice	Itzy	Aespa	

== Rookie Award ==
Year	Winner(s)		Ref.
Year	Male Group	Female Group	Ref.
2021	Epex	Ive	

== WhosFandom Award ==
Year	Winner(s)		Ref.
Year	Group	Fandom	Ref.
2021	BTS	Army	
2021	Treasure	Treasure Maker	
2021	Seventeen	Carat	

== Special Award ==
=== Trot ===
Year	Winner(s)	Ref.
2021	Lim Young-woong	

=== OST ===
Year	Winner(s)	Ref.
2021	Lee Mu-jin	

== Discontinued Awards ==
List of discontinued awards

Album Award

General Album
Year	Winner(s)	Album	Ref.
2009	G-Dragon	Heartbreaker	
2010	Super Junior	Bonamana	
2011	Super Junior	Mr. Simple	
2012	Super Junior	Sexy, Free & Single	
2013	EXO	XOXO	
2014	EXO	Overdose	
2015	EXO	Exodus	
2016	BTS	Wings	
2017	BTS	You Never Walk Alone	

Trot Album
Year	Winner(s)	Album	Ref.
2009	Byeolbanchi	Byeol Damoa	
2010	Sim Soo-bong	Beautiful Love (Shim Soo-Bong 30th Anniversary)	
2011	Shin Yu	Luxury Trot of Shin Yu	
2012	Super Junior-T	Rokkugo	
2013	Sim Soo-bong	Best of Best	
2014	Super Star Gayo Party	Super Star Gayo Party	
2015	Hong Jin-young	Life Note	
2016	Cho Hang-jo, Hong Jin-young, Shin Yu|, Jo Jung-min, Chu Ga-yeoul, Yu Ji-na, Jin Mi-ryeong, Geum Jan Di	Good Song 40 + 2	
2017	Jang Yoon-jeong	Jang Yoon-jeong Best Vol. 2	

Singer Award (Album based)

Year	Winner(s)	Ref.
2011	Super Junior	
