= Lee Chan-won =

South Korean singer (born 1996)

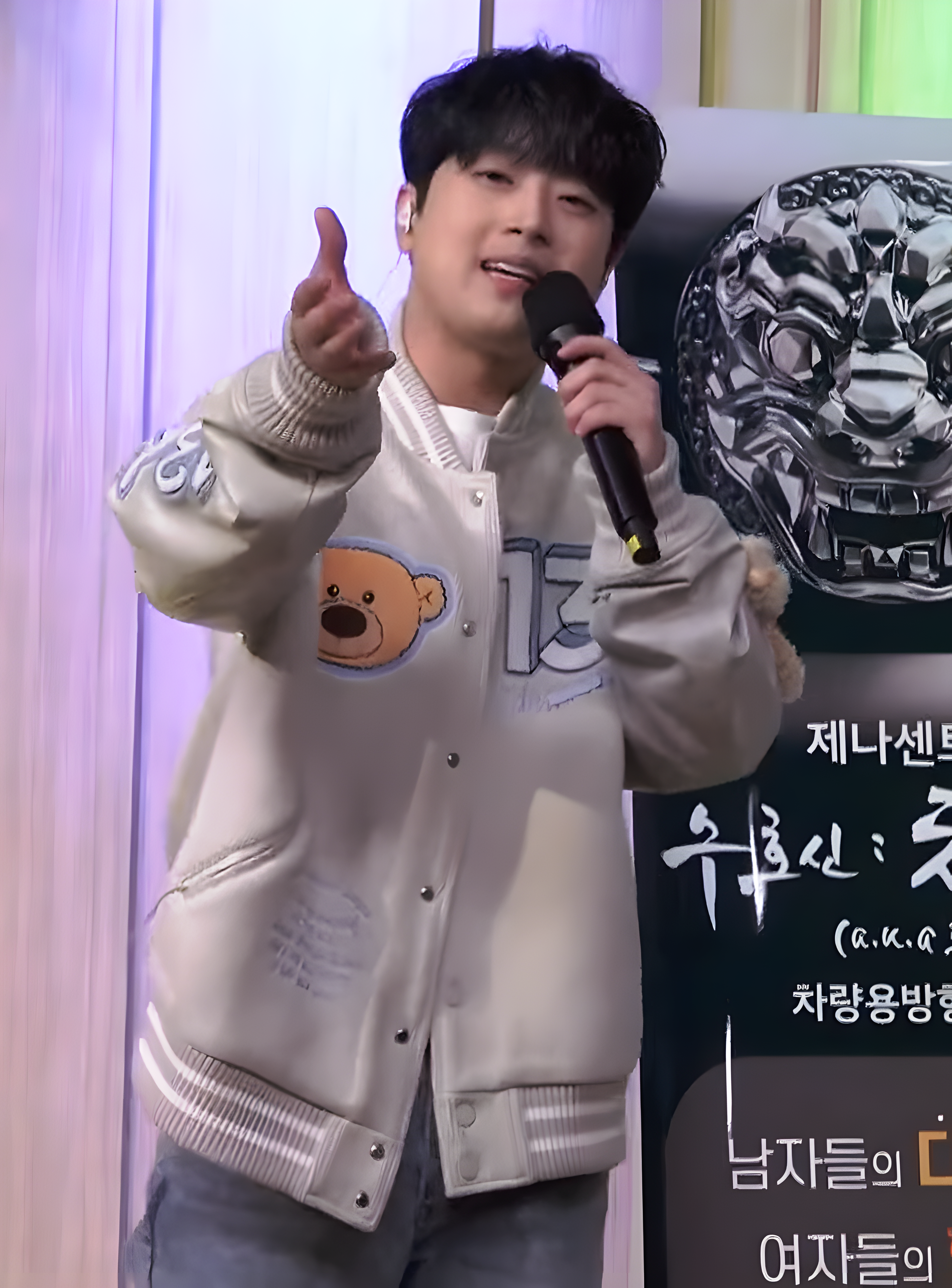
- Lee in 2023
- Born: 1 November 1996 (age 30); Ulsan, South Korea
- Education: Yeungnam University
- Occupations: Singer; entertainer
- Musical career
- Genre: Trot
- Years active: 2020–present
- Label: T.N Entertainment

- Lee Chan-won
- Hangul: 이찬원
- Hanja: 李燦元
- RR: I Chanwon
- MR: I Ch'anwŏn

Lee Chan-won (Korean: 이찬원; born 1 November 1996) is a South Korean singer and entertainer. He is known as a contestant Mr. Trot in 2020 wherein he finished seventh place. He is nicknamed Chantobaegi (찬또배기) for singing "Jintobaegi" by Lee Sung-woo during Mr. Trot.

== Life and career ==
Lee graduated from Kyungwon High School, where he used to be an emcee of school events. One of his teacher had requested him to sing "Day of Dawn" by Song Dae-kwan during the episode 2 of Romantic Call Centre on 9 April 2020. Five days later, he made a contract with Bliss Entertainment.

=== Philanthropy ===
In July 2022, Lee donated 1.5 million won as prize money for the June Good Han Star singing competition, to patients with childhood cancer Leukemia and rare incurable diseases.

On 5 September 2022, Lee donated 1.5 million won to Good Han Star August for childhood cancer patients, leukemia, and incurable diseases.

On 5 October 2022, Lee donated 2 million won to Good Han Star September for childhood cancer patients, Leukemia and incurable diseases.

In November 2022, Lee donated 2 million won as prize money for the October Good Han Star singing competition after last month to support the costs of outpatient treatment for children Pediatric cancer and leukemia.

In December 2022, Lee donated 1.5 million won to Sunhan Star Gawangjeon in November, To support the cost of treatment for children suffering from childhood cancer and leukemia.

On 5 January 2023, Lee donated 1.5 million won to Good Star Gawangjeon.

In March 2025, Lee donated 100 million won (US$68,000) to the Korea Disaster Relief Association as part of relief efforts over the wildfires, which also affected his hometown of Ulju.

On October 6, 2026, Lee donated 1 million won to the Korea Pediatric Cancer Foundation. The donation came from the prize money he received for winning the September 2026 King of Singers competition on the Good Star platform and was intended to support medical treatment for children with cancer and leukemia. According to Top Star News, the donation brought the total amount donated in Lee's name through Good Star to 82.27 million won.

== Discography ==
=== Studio albums ===
List of studio albums, with selected details, chart positions and sales
| Title | Album details | Peak chart positions | Sales | Certifications |
| Title | Album details | KOR | Sales | Certifications |
|---|---|---|---|---|
| One | Released: February 20, 2023; Label: Chorokbaem E&M; Formats: CD, digital download, streaming | 1 | KOR: 591,121 | KMCA: 2× Platinum |
| Brilliant (찬란(燦爛)) | Released: October 20, 2025; Label: Danal Entertainment; Formats: Digital download, streaming | 2 | KOR: 612,633 | |

=== Extended plays ===
| Title | EP details | Peak chart positions | Sales | Certifications |
| Title | EP details | KOR | Sales | Certifications |
|---|---|---|---|---|
| ..Gift (..선물) | Released: October 7, 2021; Label: Bliss Entertainment; Formats: CD, digital download | 2 | KOR: 111,817 | |
| One Day | Released: December 7, 2023; Label: Danal Entertainment; Formats: CD, digital download | — | | |
| Bright; 燦 | Released: April 22, 2024; Label: Danal Entertainment; Formats: CD, digital download | 1 | KOR: 608,603 | KMCA: 2× Platinum |

=== Singles ===
| Title | Year | Peak chart positions | Album |
| Title | Year | KOR | Album |
|---|---|---|---|
| "Convenience Store" (편의점) | 2021 | 30 | Non-album single |
| "Cheer Up" (힘을 내세요) | 2021 | 54 | ..Gift |
| "A Good Day with You" (참 좋은 날) | 2021 | 36 | Non-album single |
| "Wish Lanterns" (풍등) | 2023 | 9 | One |
| "Cheers" (건배) | 2023 | 135 | One |
| "Twist Go Go" (트위스트고고) | 2023 | 19 | One |
| "A Travel to the Sky" (하늘 여행) | 2024 | 7 | Bright; 燦 |
| "Maybe Today" (오늘은 왠지) | 2025 | 3 | Brilliant |

=== Other charted songs ===
| Title | Year | Peak chart position | Album |
| Title | Year | KOR Down. | Album |
|---|---|---|---|
| "메밀꽃 필무렵" | 2021 | 9 | ..Gift |
| I'm Going to Meet You" (그댈 만나러 갑니다) | 2021 | 45 | ..Gift |
| "Man's Promise" (남자의 다짐) | 2021 | 48 | ..Gift |
| "사나이 청춘" | 2023 | 38 | One |
| "오.내.언.사" | 2023 | 39 | One |
| "밥 한 번 먹자" | 2023 | 40 | One |
| "Do You Want to Go With Me" (나와 함께 가시렵니까) | 2023 | 44 | One |
| "바람 같은 사람" | 2023 | 45 | One |
| "망원동 부르스" | 2023 | 49 | One |
| "좋아 좋아" | 2023 | 53 | One |

=== Soundtrack appearances ===
List of soundtrack appearances, with selected chart positions, showing year released, and album name
| Title | Year | Peak positions | Album |
| Title | Year | KOR Down. | Album |
|---|---|---|---|
| "Fate in Time" | 2020 | 128 | Kkondae Intern OST Part 2 |

== Filmography ==
=== Television shows ===
| Year | Title | Notes |
|---|---|---|
| 2020 | Mr. Trot | Top 3 |
| 2020 | The Taste of Mr. Trot | |
| 2020 | Wife's Taste (아내의 맛) | |
| 2020 | Romantic Call Centre | |
| 2020 | Mulberry School (뽕숭아학당) | |
| 2020 | In Unity There Is A Kick | |
| 2020 | Travelling Market | |
| 2020 | Bob Bless You 2 | |
| 2021 | Peullehuiriseutto | with Kim Hee-jae |
| 2021 | Racket Boys | Club members; Episode 1–12 |
| 2021–present | Immortal Songs 2 | Waiting Room Host |
| 2022–present | Talk Pa One 25 O'Clock | Host |
| 2022 | Literacy Lalks 2 | Host |
| 2022 | Do-Won Chart | Host; with Do Kyung-wan |
| 2022 | Rather good | Host; with Jang Yoon-jeong |
| 2022 | K-Food Summit | |
| 2023–2024 | Do-Won Chart Season 2: On the Stage | Host; with Do Kyung-wan |
| 2023 | Anbang Judge | Lawyer |
| 2023 | Do-Won Chart Season 3: On the Stage | Host; with Do Kyung-wan |
| 2023 | Dilemma Game Season 1 | Host |
| 2023–2024 | Problem Child in House | Host |
| 2024–present | High-End Penny Pincher | Host |
| 2024 | Miss Trot 3 | Master |
| 2024 | Psycommentary | Host |
| 2024 | Dilemma Game Season 2 | Host |
| 2024 | Idol Star Athletics Championships | Host |
| 2024 | Chuseok Special Show: Lee Chan Won's Gift | |
| 2024–present | Secret of the Celeb Soldier | Host |
| 2024–present | Mr. Trot 3 | Master |

=== Web shows ===
| Year | Title | Role | Notes | Ref. |
|---|---|---|---|---|
| 2021 | Pong Disparue | Host | with Kim Jong-min | |
| 2022 | The Door: To Wonderland | Cast Member | Season 1 | |

=== Radio ===
| Date | Network | Title | Notes |
| 2020 | | | |
|---|---|---|---|
| Mar 19 | KBS | Park Myung-soo's Radio Show | Along with Lim Young-woong and Youngtak. |
| May 8 | MBC FM4U | Good Morning FM, this is Jang Sung-kyu | Along with Youngtak and Kim Hee-jae. |
| July 9 | CBS | Let's meet at 12 o'clock with Lee Soo-young | Along with Kim Hee-jae. |
| July 16 | TBS FM | Choi Il-gu's Hurricane Radio | Along with Jang Minho and Lim Young-woong. |
| Aug 24 | BBS FM | At the window at night, with you (밤의 창가에서, 당신과 함께합니다) | Along with Park Youngtak. |
| 2021 | | | |
| Feb 9 | | Melon Station Melon Trot Show | Along with Lim Young-woong, Park Youngtak, Jeong Dong-won, Jang Minho and Kim Hee Jae |
| Feb 10 | | Melon Station Melon Trot Show | Along with Lim Young-woong, Park Youngtak, Jeong Dong-won, Jang Minho and Kim Hee Jae |
| Feb 16 | | Melon Station Melon Trot Show | Along with Lim Young-woong, Park Youngtak, Jeong Dong-won, Jang Minho and Kim Hee Jae |
| Feb 23 | | Melon Station Melon Trot Show | Along with Lim Young-woong, Park Youngtak, Jeong Dong-won, Jang Minho and Kim Hee Jae |
| 2023 | | | |
| Mar 10 | SBS Power FM | 2 O'Clock Escape Cultwo Show | |
| Aug 23 | KBS Cool FM | Yoon Jung-soo and Nam Chang-hee's Mr Radio | |
| Aug 24 | SBS Power FM | 2 O'Clock Escape Cultwo Show | |
| Aug 28 | MBC Standard FM | Jeong Seon-hee, Moon Cheon-sik's Now is the Radio Era (Recording) | |
| 2024 | | | |
| Apr 23 | MBC Standard FM | Park Jun-Hyung, Park Yong-jin's 2 O'Clock Cheers | |
| Apr 26 | KBS Cool FM | Lee Eun-ji's Gayo Plaza | |
| Apr 29 | KBS Cool FM | Mr Radio | |
| Apr 30 | SBS Power FM | Cultwo Show | |
| May 1 | MBC FM4U | Noon's Hope Song with Kim Shin-young | |
| 2025 | | | |
| July 16 | SBS Power FM | Cultwo Show | |
| Oct 21 | KBS Cool FM | Lee Eun-ji's Gayo Plaza | |
| Oct 22 | SBS Power FM | Wendy's Young Street (Recording) | |
| Oct 24 | KBS Cool FM | Yoon Jung-soo and Nam Chang-hee's Mr. Radio (Recording) | |
| Oct 28 | SBS Power FM | Cultwo Show | |
| 2026 | | | |
| Apr 7 | SBS Power FM | Cultwo Show | |

=== Commercial ===
| Year | Company | Brand | Notes |
|---|---|---|---|
| 2020 | Korea Ginseng Corporation | Jungkwanjang 정관장 굿베이스 | |
| 2020 | Paemtek Cosmetics | WellDerma 웰더마 | |
| 2020 | MPK Group Inc. | Mr. Pizza 미스터피자 | Along with Park Youngtak and Jang Minho |
| 2020 | Hwangchil World | Hwangchil Plus Raw Makgeolli 황칠플러스 생막걸리 | |
| 2020 | BK International | Strongbiotics 스트롱바이오틱스 | |
| 2020 | Aheads | Aheads Shampoo 어헤즈샴푸 | |
| 2021 | Mexicana | Chick'n the Home 치킨더홈 | |
| 2021 | BK International | Lycomato 라이코마토 | |
| 2021 | GS25 Retail | GS25 | |
| 2022 | | DSV METEOR hair & scalp | |
| 2022 | Cosmore Plus | Revcell 리브이셀 | |
| 2023 | Syspang | Syspang 씨스팡 | |
| 2023 | Kyowon Property | Kyowon Wells 교원웰스 | |
| 2023 | Sugar Eco Co. Ltd | Sugar Bubble 슈가버블 | |
| 2023 | Geumbokju | Clean Morning Cham Soju 깨끗한 아침 참 | |
| 2023 | Gyeongju Beopju | Gyeongju Beopju Rice Makgeolli 경주법주 쌀막걸리 | |
| 2024 | Pyungang Oriental Medicine Research Institute | Oral Medicine 구전녹용 | |
| 2024 | Geonjong | Baroin 바로인슈즈 | |
| 2024 | Won and One | Won Grandma Bossam 원할머니보쌈족발 | |
| 2024 | Pfizer Pharmaceuticals Korea Limited | Prevenar13 프리베나13 | |
| 2025 | Dong-A Pharmaceutical Co. Ltd | Max Chondroitin 1200 맥스콘드로이틴1200 | |
| 2025 | Dong-gung Jjimdak | Dong-gung Jjimdak 동궁찜닭 | |
| 2026 | Dong-A Pharmaceutical Co. Ltd | Panpyrin 판피린 | |

=== Hosting ===
| Year | Title | Notes | Ref. |
|---|---|---|---|
| 2022 | 1st Dream Concert Trot | with Do Kyung-wan | |
| 2024 | 2024 KBS Entertainment Awards | with Lee Joon and Lee Young-ji | |

== Concert ==
| Date | Concert Name | Location | Note |
2020
| Aug 7 – Aug 16 | Tomorrow is the <Mr. Trot> National Appreciation Concert | KSPO Dome | |
| Oct 30 – Nov 1 | Tomorrow is <Mr. Trot> TOP6 National Tour Concert - Busan | BEXCO | |
| Nov 6 – Nov 8 | Tomorrow is <Mr. Trot> TOP6 National Tour Concert - Gwangju | Gwangju Women's University Universiade Gymnasium | |
| Nov 12 – Nov 15 | Tomorrow is the TOP6 nationwide tour concert of <Mr. Trot> - Seoul | KSPO Dome | |
2021
| June 18 – June 20 | Tomorrow is the 〈Mr. Trot〉 TOP6 National Tour Concert - Daegu | EXCO | |
| June 25 – June 27 | Tomorrow is <Mr. Trot> TOP6 National Tour Concert - Gwangju | Kim Dae-jung Convention Center | |
| July 2 – July 4 | Tomorrow is the TOP6 nationwide tour concert of <Mr. Trot> - Seoul | KSPO Dome | |
| July 9 | Playheeristo Online Camping Concert | | |
| July 10 – July 11 | Tomorrow is <Mr. Trot> TOP6 National Tour Concert - Cheongju | Cheongju University College of Arts Seokwoo Culture and Sports Center | |
| Aug 27 – Aug 29 | Tomorrow is <Mr. Trot> TOP6 National Tour Concert - Goyang | KINTEX Exhibition Center 1 | |
| Oct 23 – Oct 24 | Lee Chan-won's First Fan Concert "Chan's Time" - Seoul | Olympic Park Olympic Hall | First solo concert 4 times |
| Nov 5 – Nov 6 | Lee Chan-won's First Fan Concert "Chan's Time" - Busan | Busan KBS Hall | 3 times |
| Dec 4 – Dec 5 | Lee Chan-won's First Fan Concert "Chan's Time" - Ulsan | KBS Ulsan Hall | 3 times |
| Dec 11 – Dec 12 | Lee Chan-won's First Fan Concert "Chan's Time" - Goyang | KINTEX Exhibition Center 1 | 2 times |
| Dec 18 – Dec 19 | Lee Chan-won's First Fan Concert "Chan's Time" - Incheon | Songdo Convensia | 2 times |
| Dec 24 – Dec 25 | Lee Chan-won's First Fan Concert "Chan's Time" - Daegu | EXCO | 3 times |
| Dec 26 | Lee Chan-won's First Fan Concert "Chan's Time" - Gwangju | Gwangju Women's University City Universiade Gymnasium | 1 time |
| Dec 31 | Lee Chan-won's First Fan Concert "Chan's Time" - Changwon | Changwon Convention Center | 1 time |
2022
| Jan 1 | Lee Chan-won's First Fan Concert "Chan's Time" - Changwon | Changwon Convention Center | 1 time |
| Jan 8 – Jan 9 | Lee Chan-won's First Fan Concert "Chan's Time" - Daejeon | Daejeon Convention Center | 3 times |
| Jan 28 – Jan 30 | Lee Chan-won's Fan Concert "ONE MORE CHAN'S" - Seoul Encore | Olympic Park Olympic Hall | 4 times |
| May 6 – May 8 | 2022 Jang Min-ho & Lee Chan-won Concert "Minwon Satisfaction" - Seoul | Jamsil Indoor Gymnasium | With Jang Minho |
| May 21 | 2022 Jang Min-ho & Lee Chan-won Concert "Minwon Satisfaction" - Daejeon | Daejeon Convention Center | |
| May 29 | 2022 Jang Min-ho & Lee Chan-won Concert "Minwon Satisfaction"- Incheon | Songdo Convensia | |
| June 5 | 2022 Jang Min-ho & Lee Chan-won Concert "Minwon Satisfaction" - Jeonju | Korean Traditional Performing Arts Center Outdoor Performance Hall | |
| June 11 – June 12 | 2022 Jang Min-ho & Lee Chan-won Concert "Minwon Satisfaction" - Busan | Busan KBS Hall | 2 times |
| June 26 | 2022 Jang Min-ho & Lee Chan-won Concert "Minwon Satisfaction" - Cheongju | Cheongju University Seokwoo Culture and Sports Center | |
| July 10 | 2022 Jang Min-ho & Lee Chan-won Concert "Minwon Satisfaction" - Anyang | Anyang Gymnasium | |
| July 24 | 2022 Jang Min-ho & Lee Chan-won Concert "Minwon Satisfaction" - Gangneung | Catholic Kwandong University Gymnasium | |
| Aug 6 – Aug 7 | 2022 Jang Min-ho & Lee Chan-won Concert "Minwon Satisfaction" - Daegu | EXCO East Wing Hall 6 | 2 times |
| Aug 27 – Aug 28 | 2022 Jang Min-ho & Lee Chan-won Concert "Minwon Satisfaction" - Seoul Encore | Jamsil Indoor Gymnasium | 2 times |
2023
| Mar 24 – Mar 26 | 2023 Lee Chan-won Concert "ONE DAY" - Seoul | Olympic Park Olympic Hall | 3 times |
| Apr 8 – Apr 9 | 2023 Lee Chan-won Concert "ONE DAY" - Chuncheon | Kangwon National University Baekryeong Art Center | 2 times |
| Apr 22 – Apr 23 | 2023 Lee Chan-won Concert "ONE DAY" - Seongnam | Seongnam Arts Center Opera House | 2 times |
| May 5 – May 7 | 2023 Lee Chan-won Concert ONE DAY - Daegu | EXCO 5th Floor Convention Hall | 3 times |
| May 20 – May 21 | 2023 Lee Chan-won Concert ONE DAY - Daejeon | Chungnam National University Jeongsimhwa Hall | 2 times |
| June 9 – June 10 | 2023 Lee Chan-won Concert ONE DAY - Busan | BEXCO Auditorium | 2 times |
| June 24 – June 25 | 2023 Lee Chan-won Concert ONE DAY - Goyang | Goyang Aram Nuri Aram Theater | 2 times |
| July 8 – July 9 | 2023 Lee Chan-won Concert ONE DAY - Cheonan | Cheonan Arts Center Grand Performance Hall | 2 times |
| July 28 – July 30 | 2023 Lee Chan-won Concert ONE DAY - Seoul Encore | Olympic Park Olympic Hall | 3 times |
| Dec 23 – Dec 25 | 2023 Lee Chan-won Concert "Chance Thanksgiving" - Seoul | Olympic Park Olympic Hall | 3 times |
| Dec 30 – Dec 31 | 2023 Lee Chan-won Concert "Chance Thanksgiving" - Daegu | Daegu EXCO East Wing Hall 6 | 2 times |
2024
| Jan 1 | 2023 Lee Chan-won Concert "Chance Thanksgiving" - Daegu | Daegu EXCO East Wing Hall 6 | 1 time |
| June 8 – June 9 | 2024 Lee Chan-won Concert 'Chan-ga' - Seoul | KSPO Dome | 2 times |
| June 22 – June 23 | 2024 Lee Chan-won Concert 'Chan-ga' - Incheon | Incheon Samsan World Gymnasium | 2 times |
| July 13 -July 14 | 2024 Lee Chan-won Concert 'Chan-ga' - Andong | Andong Indoor Gymnasium | 2 times |
| July 27 – July 28 | 2024 Lee Chan-won Concert 'Chan-ga' - Suwon | Suwon Sports Complex Indoor Gymnasium | 2 times |
| Sept 21 – Sept 22 | 2024 Lee Chan-won Concert 'Chan-ga' - Busan | Busan BEXCO Exhibition Center 1 Hall 1 | 2 times |
| Oct 12 – Oct 13 | 2024 Lee Chan-won Concert 'Chan-ga' - Daegu | Daegu EXCO East Wing Hall 6 | 2 times |
| Nov 2 – Nov 3 | 2024 Lee Chan-won Concert 'Chan-ga' - Cheongju | Cheongju University College of Arts Seokwoo Culture and Sports Center | 2 times |
| Nov 23 – Nov 24 | 2024 Lee Chan-won Concert 'Chan-ga' - Gwangju | Kim Dae-jung Convention Center Multipurpose Hall | 2 times |
| Dec 13 – Dec 15 | 2024 Lee Chan-won Concert 'Chan-ga' - Seoul Encore | KSPO Dome | 3 times |
2025 - 2026
| Dec 12 - Dec 14 | 2025-2026 Lee Chan-won Concert <Hymn: A Brilliant Day> - Seoul | Jamsil Indoor Stadium | 3 times |
| Dec 25, Dec 27, Dec 28 | 2025-2026 Lee Chan-won Concert <Hymn: A Brilliant Day> - Daegu | Daegu EXCO East Wing Hall 6 | 3 times |
| Jan 10 - Jan 11 | 2025-2026 Lee Chan-won Concert <Hymn: A Brilliant Day> - Incheon | Songdo Convention Caner Hall 3 and 4 | 2 times |
| Jan 31 - Feb 1 | 2025-2026 Lee Chan-won Concert <Hymn: A Brilliant Day> - Busan | Busan BEXCO Exhibition Center 1 Hall 1 | 2 times |
| Feb 21 - Feb 22 | 2025-2026 Lee Chan-won Concert <Hymn: A Brilliant Day> - Jinju | Jinju Indoor Gymnasium | 2 times |
| Mar 7 - Mar 8 | 2025-2026 Lee Chan-won Concert <Hymn: A Brilliant Day> - Gwangju | Kim Dae-jung Convention Center Multipurpose Hall | 2 times |
| Mar 28 - Mar 29 | 2025-2026 Lee Chan-won Concert <Hymn: A Brilliant Day> - Daejeon | DCC Daejeon Convention Center Exhibition Hall 2 | 2 times |
| May 9 - May 10 | 2025-2026 Lee Chan-won Concert <Hymn: A Brilliant Day> - Seoul Encore | KSPO Dome | 2 times |

== Events ==
| Date | Name | Note | Ref. |
2021
| Sept 30 | Hamyang Ginseng Anti-aging Expo Special Concert 함양산삼항노화엑스포 스페셜 콘서트 | | |
| Oct 2 | Let's go together! Donggu Healing Concert - Daegu 같이가요! 동구 힐링콘서트 - 대구 | | |
| Nov 14 | Taean Indoor Gymnasium Opening Commemoration "Trot King, Meeting with Taean County Residents" 태안종합실내체육관 개관 기념 "트롯가왕, 태안군민과의 만남" | | |
| Nov 19 | Cheer up Yanggu! Healing Concert 'Yangrokje' 힘내라 양구! 힐링콘서트 '양록제' | | |
| Nov 21 | Gangwon-do Vaccine Incentive Performance 'Meet Again Concert' 강원도 백신 인센티브 공연 '다시 만나 콘서트' | | |
2022
| Apr 23 | Suncheon Bay International Garden Expo D-365 Concert 2023 순천만국제정원박람회 D-365 콘서트 | | |
| Apr 27 | Trot Traditional Music Festival 트롯국악한마당 | | |
| Apr 30 | KB Staz V2 Integrated Victory Commemoration JUST ONE KB KB Staz V2 통합 우승 기념 JUST ONE KB | | |
| May 13 | Yeungnam University 75th Anniversary Commemorative Concert 영남대학교 개교 75주년 기념음악회 | | |
| May 28 | Seodaegu Station Opening Celebration Concert 서대구역 개통 축하 음악회 | | |
| June 4 | Mungyeong Lala 2022 Summer Night Concert 문경 랄라 2022 여름밤 콘서트 | | |
| June 8 | Gyeongju Citizens' Day Celebration Performance 경주 시민의 날 축하공연 | | |
| June 9 | 18th Gyeonggi Northern Music and Arts Festival 제18회 경기북부 음악예술제 | | |
| June 10 | 57th Gangwon Provincial Sports Festival Celebration Performance 제57회 강원도민체육대회 축하공연 | | |
| June 25 | 2nd Gimcheon Plum National Song Festival 제2회 김천자두 전국 가요제 | | |
| July 15 | 60th Gyeongbuk Provincial Sports Festival Opening 제60회 경북도민체육대회 개회식 축하 무대 | | |
| July 16 | 2022 Seongju Summer Art Concert 성주 썸머아트콘서트 | | |
| July 31 | 24th Bonghwa Silverfish Festival Mr. Trot Concert 제24회 봉화은어축제 미스터트롯 콘서트 | | |
| Aug 21 | 2nd Cheonminmanrak Tongtong Samseonghyeon Cultural Festival 제2회 천민만락 통통 삼성현 문화축제 | | |
| Aug 25 | 68th Gyeonggi Provincial Sports Festival Celebration Performance 제68회 경기도체육대회 축하공연 | | |
| Sept 17 | The 7th Juwangsan Poetry and Traditional Korean Music Festival 제7회 주왕산 시와 국악의 만남 K-Trot Festival - Gyeongju K-트로트 페스티벌 - 경주 | | |
| Sept 21 | Trot Concert with Gems 젬있는 트롯 콘서트 | 3pm & 7.30pm | |
| Sept 24 | 2022 Suyeongmot Festival 2022 수성못 페스티벌 Geumho River Wind Sound Road Festival 금호강 바람소리길 축제 | | |
| Oct 1 | 2022 Yangsan Sapryang Cultural Festival Closing Ceremony 2022 양산삽량문화축전 폐막식 | | |
| Oct 2 | Yongmunsa Daejangjeon and Yunjangdae National Treasure Promotion Celebration Concert 용문사 대장전·윤장대 국보승격 축하음악회 2022 Sangju Soul Food Festival 2022 상주 소울푸드 페스티벌 | | |
| Oct 7 | Goesan 2022 Hanwooin National Competition 괴산 2022 한우인 전국대회 Daejeon Hyomunhwa Roots Festival Opening Ceremony 대전효문화뿌리축제 개막식 | | |
| Oct 9 | 2022 Yeongju World Ginseng Expo 2022 영주 세계풍기인삼엑스포 Jungak Palgongsan Silver Culture Festival 중악 팔공산 은빛 문화제 | | |
| Oct 11 | Now is the local era, Yeongnam-Honam harmony concert 지금은 지방시대, 영호남 화합 콘서트 | | |
| Oct 15 | 2022 Mungyeong Apple Festival Opening Ceremony 2022 문경사과축제 개막식 Daegu Dong-gu Citizens' Harmony Festival 대구 동구 구민화합 어울림한마당 | | |
| Oct 16 | 15th Mapo Naru Shrimp Paste Festival 제15회 마포나루 새우젓축제 | | |
| Oct 20 | 11th Taego Cultural Festival 제11회 태고문화축제 | | |
| Oct 22 | Gangseo-gu Citizen Trot Song Festival 강서구민 트롯가요제 | | |
| Oct 30 | 1st Theme Park Picnic Autumn Festival 제1회 테마파크 소풍 가을 대축제 | Attended but did not perform. Event rescheduled. | |
| Nov 9 | 1st Theme Park Picnic Autumn Festival 제1회 테마파크소풍 가을대축제 | | |
| Nov 11 | Cheongsong Apple Festival World Confucian Culture Festival (Trot Concert) 청송사과축제 세계유교문화축전(트로트 콘서트) | | |
| Nov 13 | 1st PPO Festival Music Festa 제1회 PPO대축제 뮤직페스타 | | |
| Dec 3 | High1 New Star Concert 하이원 New 스타콘서트 | | |
2023
| Mar 8 | 2023 Nonsan Strawberry Festival Opening Celebration Performance 2023 논산 딸기축제 개막 축하공연 | | |
| Mar 15 | Goheung Ollae Concert 고흥 올래 콘서트 | | |
| Mar 21 | Sunlight Sharing Green Sharing Campaign 햇빛나눔 그린나눔 캠페인 | | |
| Apr 12 | MG Hope Sharing Concert MG 희망나눔 콘서트 | | |
| Apr 21 | MG Concert MG 음악회 | | |
| Apr 30 | Boseong World Tea Expo Daily Concert 2023 보성세계차EXPO 데일리 콘서트 | | |
| May 11 | 62nd Chungbuk Provincial Sports Competition 제62회 충북도민체육대회 | | |
| May 13 | Red Road Festival 레드로드 페스티벌 2023 Lantern Festival with Incheon Citizens 2023 인천시민과 함께하는 연등축제 | | |
| May 14 | 2023 Hadong World Tea Expo 하동세계차엑스포 | | |
| May 26 | 2023 Hanam BBQ Beer Festival 2023 하남 BARBECUE BEER FESTIVAL | | |
| May 27 | Gokseong World Rose Festival 곡성 세계장미축제 93rd Namwon Chunhyang Festival 제93회 남원 춘향제 | | |
| June 1 | MG Hope Sharing Jeju Concert MG 희망나눔 제주음악회 | | |
| June 2 | 39th Danyang Sobaeksan Azalea Festival Opening Concert 제39회 단양 소백산 철쭉제 개막 콘서트 | | |
| June 3 | 58th Gangwon Provincial Sports Festival Opening Ceremony 제58회 강원도민체육대회 개회식 | | |
| June 4 | 2023 Songdo World Food Festival 2023 송도 월드푸드 페스티벌 | | |
| June 14 | Ulsan MG Concert 울산 MG 음악회 | | |
| June 16 | Gochang Bokbunja and Watermelon Festival 고창 복분자와 수박축제 | | |
| June 18 | Lotte Duty Free Family Concert 롯데면세점 패밀리 콘서트 | | |
| June 30 | Changwon Citizens' Day 창원 시민의 날 | | |
| July 1 | Gunwi-gun K-Trot Festival 군위군 K-트롯 페스티벌 1st Mungyeong Trot Song Festival 제1회 문경 트롯가요제 | | |
| July 22 | 3rd Goseong Hope Dream Concert 제3회 고성 희망드림 콘서트 | | |
| Aug 22 | Jeongnamjin Jangheung Water Festival 정남진 장흥 물축제 | | |
| Aug 29 | 2023 Gwangmyeong BBF (Barbecue Beer Festival) 2023 광명 BBF(바비큐비어페스티벌) | | |
| Sept 1 | 2023 Cheongyang Gochugugija Cultural Festival Opening Ceremony 2023 청양고추구기자 문화축제 개막식 | | |
| Sept 2 | 27th Muju Firefly Festival Opening Ceremony 제27회 무주반딧불축제 개막식 | | |
| Sept 3 | 2023 Corporate Citizen POSCO Concert 'FALL IN Trot Pohang' 2023 기업시민 포스코 콘서트 'FALL IN 트로트-포항' | | |
| Sept 7 | 29th Chungcheongnam-do Disabled Sports Competition Celebration Performance 제29회 충청남도장애인체육대회 축하공연 | | |
| Sept 8 | 2023 Korea Integrated Medical Expo Opening Ceremony 2023 대한민국통합의학박람회 개막식 | | |
| Sept 9 | 6th Changnyeong Onion Festival 제6회 창녕 양파가요제 | | |
| Sept 10 | 2023 Green Future Concert 2023 그린 미래로 콘서트 | | |
| Sept 12 | 2023 Corporate Citizen POSCO Concert 'FALL IN Trot Gwangyang' 2023 기업시민 포스코 콘서트 'FALL IN 트로트-광양' | | |
| Sept 15 | 34th Gyeonggi Province Sports Festival Opening Ceremony 제34회 경기도생활체육대축전 개회식 | | |
| Sept 16 | Eco Land Fall Music Concert 에코랜드 가을음악회 | | |
| Sept 17 | 17th Jangsu Hanwoorang Apple Festival Closing Ceremony 제17회 장수 한우랑사과랑 축제 폐막식 | | |
| Sept 20 | Ongjin County Citizens' Singing Contest 옹진군민 노래자랑 | | |
| Sept 21 | 2023 Sancheong World Traditional Medicine Anti-Aging Expo 2023 산청 세계전통의약항노화엑스포 | | |
| Sept 22 | 2023 Gangwon World Forest Expo 2023 강원세계산림엑스포 36th Donghae Mureung Festival 제36회 동해 무릉제 | | |
| Sept 23 | Daegu Seo-gu Love Matoko Concert 'West Wind' 대구 서구愛 마토콘서트 '서풍' | | |
| Sept 24 | 2023 Silver Concert 2023 은빛음악회 | | |
| Sept 28 | 2023 Blue House K-Music Festival 청와대 K-뮤직 페스티벌 | | |
| Sept 30 | 2023 Powerful Daegu Song Festival 2023 파워풀 대구가요제 | | |
| Oct 5 | 29th Gyeyang District Citizens' Day Autumn Music Concert & Drone Show 제29회 계양구민의 날 기념 가을음악회&드론쇼 | | |
| Oct 6 | 2023 Guro G Festival 2023 구로G페스티벌 | | |
| Oct 7 | 2023 Gangnam Festival Maru Park Green Concert 2023강남페스티벌 마루공원 그린콘서트 | | |
| Oct 8 | 58th Seorak Cultural Festival Closing Ceremony 제58회 설악문화제 폐막식 | | |
| Oct 11 | 2023 Seoul Beer Fantastic Festival 2023 서울맥주판타스틱페스티벌 | | |
| Oct 13 | 29th Samcheok Citizens' Day 제29회 삼척시민의 날 | | |
| Oct 14 | 2023 Mungyeong Apple Festival Opening Ceremony 2023 문경사과축제 개막식 | | |
| Oct 15 | Sangju World Hat Festival Closing Ceremony 상주세계모자페스티벌 폐막식 | | |
| Oct 20 | 17th Cheongju Sejong the Great and Chojeong 제17회 청주 세종대왕과 초정약수축제 | | |
| Oct 21 | 3rd Gwangyang K-POP Festival 제3회 광양 K-POP 페스티벌 | | |
| Oct 22 | 9th Jeonggwan Ecological River Culture Festival 제9회 정관생태하천문화축제 | | |
| Nov 3 | 17th Cheongsong Apple Festival 제17회 청송사과축제 | | |
| Nov 4 | 2023 K-Music Season: Good Night Concert in Busan 2023 K-뮤직 시즌 : 굿밤 콘서트 in 부산 | | |
| Nov 12 | Yeosu Hello Concert Good Day 여수 헬로콘서트 좋은날 | | |
| Nov 16 | Gyeongbuk Yeongyang Bulmok Night Market 경북 영양 불목 야시장 | | |
| Nov 17 | Citizen Concert to Commemorate WSL World Championship Hosting WSL 세계대회 유치 기념 시민음악회 | | |
| Nov 25 | Baekmanhwa Festival with Light and Music 빛과 음악이 함께하는 백만화성축제 | | |
| Dec 6 | Hongcheon 2023 Winter Night Memories Making Concert 홍천 2023 겨울밤 추억만들기 콘서트 | | |
| Dec 16 | Yeoncheon Subway Opening Celebration Ceremony 연천 전철개통 축하행사 | | |
2024
| Jan 12 | The 8th Jirisan Hamyang Gojongsi Dried Persimmon Festival 제8회 지리산 함양고종시 곶감축제 | | |
| Jan 13 | 2024 Sharing & Together Concert | | |
| Jan 20 | Yeongdong Dried Persimmon Festival 2024 영동 곶감축제 | | |
| May 5 | 2024 Imsil N Pet Star 2024 임실N펫스타 | | |
| May 8 | Incheon Airport Trot Festa 인천공항 트롯페스타 | | |
| May 10 | 62nd Gyeongbuk Provincial Sports Festival Opening Ceremony Celebration Performance 제62회 경북도민체육대회 개회식 축하공연 | | |
| May 11 | 57th Donghak Peasant Revolution Memorial Ceremony 제57회 동학농민혁명기념제 | | |
| May 15 | 94th Namwon Chunhyang Festival Chunhyang Selection Contest Celebration Performance 제94회 남원 춘향제 춘향선발대회 축하공연 | | |
| May 19 | SBS MEGA Concert - Incheon SBS MEGA 콘서트 - 인천 | | |
| May 25 | 2024 Powerful K-Trot Festival 2024 파워풀 K-트로트 페스티벌 | | |
| June 13 | 76th Chungcheongnam-do Citizens' Sports Festival Opening Ceremony 제76회 충청남도민체육대회 개회식 | | |
| June 15 | 2nd Mungyeong Trot Song Festival 제2회 문경 트롯 가요제 | | |
| June 16 | 2024 Ganjeolgot Specialty Products Festival Celebration Performance 2024 간절곶 특산물 대축제 축하공연 | | |
| June 29 | Ulju in Joy 울주 in 조이 | | |
| July 4 | Korea Healing Concert Goyang 2024 대한민국 힐링 콘서트 고양 2024 | | |
| July 19 | 2024 Ulsan Shipbuilding and Marine Festival Opening Ceremony 2024 울산 조선해양축제 개막축하공연 | | |
| July 20 | 2024 Seongju Summer Frost Concert 2024 성주 여름서리 콘서트 | | |
| July 31 | Boryeong 16th National Marine Sports Festival Opening Ceremony 보령 제16회 전국해양스포츠제전 개회식 | | |
| Sept 3 | 17th Anseong World Soft Tennis Championships 제17회 안성 세계소프트테니스 선수권대회 | | |
| Sept 5 | 18th Jangsu Hanwoo and Apple Festival 제18회 장수 한우랑 사과랑 축제 | | |
| Sept 6 | 61st Jeonbuk Special Self-Governing Province Citizens' Sports Competition 제61회 전북특별자치도민 체육대회 | | |
| Sept 7 | 2024 Hanam Music Festival 2024 하남뮤직페스티벌 | | |
| Sept 27 | 2024 International Namdo Food Culture Festival (Mokpo) 2024 국제 남도음식문화 큰잔치 (목포) | | |
| Sept 28 | 43rd Seolseong Cultural Festival (Eumseong) 제43회 설성문화제 (음성) | | |
| Sept 29 | 13th Songtan Tourism Special Zone Hanmaum Festival (Pyeongtaek) 제13회 송탄관광특구 한마음대축제 (평택) | | |
| Oct 2 | 2024 Jeongseon Arirang Festival Opening Ceremony 2024 정선 아리랑제 개막식 | | |
| Oct 3 | Uiryeong Rich Rich Festival - Rich Concert 의령 리치리치 페스티벌 - 리치콘서트 | | |
| Oct 4 | 20th Hoengseong Hanwoo Festival 제20회 횡성한우축제 | | |
| Oct 5 | 35th Busan Citizens Sports Festival 제35회 부산 시민체육대축전 | | |
| Oct 6 | Jinan Red Ginseng Festival Closing Performance 진안 홍삼 축제 폐막공연 | | |
| Oct 17 | Yesan Market Samguk Festival 예산장터 삼국축제 | | |
| Oct 18 | Gimhae Gaya Culture Festival 김해 가야문화축제 | | |
| Oct 19 | 2024 Mungyeong Apple Festival Opening Celebration Performance 2024 문경사과축제 개막 축하공연 26th UN Peace Festival (Busan) 제26회 UN평화축제 (부산) | | |
| Oct 20 | 8th Happy Day Healing Concert (Dongducheon) 제8회 해피데이 힐링콘서트 (동두천) Mapo Naru Shrimp Paste Festival 마포나루 새우젓 축제 | | |
| Oct 25 | 44th National Disabled Sports Festival (Gimhae) 제44회 전국장애인체육대회 (김해) | | |
| Oct 26 | Sacheon KASA Festival 사천 KASA 페스티벌 | | |
| Oct 30 | With Oneik Festival 위드 원익 페스티벌 Cheongsong Apple Festival 청송사과축제 | | |
| Nov 8 | APEC Success Concert (Gyeongju) APEC 성공개최 기원 콘서트(경주) | | |
| Nov 27 | Lotte Home Shopping Kwangkul Concert 롯데홈쇼핑 광클콘서트 | | |
2025
| Jan 11 | Sangju Dried Persimmon Festival 상주곶감축제 | | |
| Jan 12 | Hamyang Dried Persimmon Festival 함양곶감축제 | | |
| Mar 1 | 2025 Uljin Crab and Red Crab Festival 2025 울진대게와 붉은대게 축제 | | |
| Mar 28 | 63rd Jinhae Gunhang Festival Opening Ceremony 제63회 진해 군항제 개막식 | | |
| Apr 19 | Gunpo Azalea Festival 군포 철쭉축제 | | |
| Apr 25 | Gyeongju Gampo Port 100th Anniversary Ceremony 경주 감포항 100년 기념행사 | | |
| May 2 | Damyang Bamboo Festival 담양 대나무축제 | | |
| May 3 | 2025 Imsil N Pet Star 2025 임실N펫스타 | | |
| May 4 | 37th Yeoju Ceramic Festival 제37회 여주 도자기축제 | | |
| May 6 | Hampyeong Butterfly Festival 함평 나비축제 | | |
| May 9 | 24th Jangseong Hwangryong River Gildongmu Flower Road Festival 제24회 장성 황룡강 길동무 꽃길축제 | | |
| May 11 | 2025 Guri Rape Blossom Festival 구리 유채꽃 축제 | | |
| May 23 | Danyang Sobaeksan Azalea Festival 단양 소백산 철쭉제 | | |
| June 7 | Goryeong Melting Festival 고령 멜빙축제 | | |
| June 12 | 60th Gangwon Special Self-Governing Province Citizens' Sports Competition 제60회 강원특별자치도민체육대회 | | |
| June 15 | 10th Sokcho Displaced People Cultural Festival 제10회 속초 실향민 문화축제 | | |
| July 1 | Open Concert to Commemorate the 30th Anniversary of Yangsan City's Promotion 양산 시 승격 30주년 기념 - 열린콘서트 동행 | | |
| July 26 | 10th Taebaek Han River and Nakdong River Source Festival 제10회 태백 한강·낙동강 발원지 축제 | | |
| August 6 | 2025 Ulsan Summer Festival 2025 울산서머페스티벌 | | |
| August 29 | Daegu Dalseo-gu Sonagi Concert 대구 달서구 소나기 콘서트 | | |
| Sept 6 | Concert to Commemorate the Inscription of the Bangucheon Petroglyphs as a World Heritage Site 반구천의 암각화 세계유산 등재 기념 콘서트 | | |
| Sept 13 | 3rd Busanjin-gu Citizens' Open Concert 제3회 부산진구민 열린음악회 | | |
| Sept 16 | Dongrak Trot Concert Season 2 동락(同樂) 트롯콘서트 시즌2 | | |
| Sept 20 | Incheon Seo-gu Citizens' Day 인천 서구 구민의 날 | | |
| Sept 26 | 46th Saenggeojincheon Cultural Festival 제46회 생거진천 문화축제 | | |
| Sept 27 | 31st Geoje Citizens' Day 제31회 거제 시민의 날 | | |
| Sept 28 | Daegu Seo-gu 9th Empathy Concert 대구 서구 제9회 공감음악회 | | |
| Oct 2 | 2025 Namdo International Gourmet Industry Expo 2025 남도국제미식산업박람회 | | |
| Oct 17 | 30th Miryang Citizens' Day 제30회 밀양 시민의 날 | | |
| Oct 18 | Daegu Dong-gu Community Festival 대구 동구 어울림 한마당 | | |
| Oct 19 | 18th Mapo Naru Shrimp Paste Festival 제18회 마포나루 새우젓축제 | | |
| Oct 25 | 7:00 PM 8th City Sea Festival (Noryangjin) 제8회 도심속 바다축제(노량진) | | |
| Oct 29 | 19th Cheongsong Apple Festival 제19회 청송사과축제 | | |
| Nov 8 | 2025 Jukbyeon Port Seafood Festival 2025 죽변항 수산물축제 | | |
| Nov 11 | The 30th National Commemorative Ceremony for Farmers' Day (Wonju) 제30회 농업인의날 국가기념식(원주) | | |
| Nov 19 | Lotte Home Shopping Mega Click Concer 롯데홈쇼핑 광클콘서트 | | |
| Nov 29 | Korean Rice, Korean Alcohol K-Rice Festa 우리쌀 우리술 K-라이스페스타 | | |
2026
| Jan 17 | The 10th Jirisan Hamyang Gojongsi Dried Persimmon Festival 제10회 지리산함양 고종시 곶감축제 | | |
| Jan 23 | 2026 Sangju Dried Persimmon Festival 2026 상주곶감축제 | | |
| Apr 3 | The 64th Gyeongbuk Citizens' Sports Festival 제64회 경북도민체육대회 | | |
| Apr 4 | 2026 Dongdaemun-gu Trot Festival X Spring Flower Festival 2026 동대문구 트로트축제X봄꽃축제 | | |
| Apr 24 | The 59th Danjong Cultural Festival Opening Concert 제59회 단종문화제 개막콘서트 | | |
| Apr 25 | Opening Ceremony of the 2026 Taean International Horticultural Therapy Expo 2026 태안국제원예치유박람회 개막식 | | |

== Accolades ==
=== Awards and nominations ===
Name of the award ceremony, year presented, category, nominee of the award, and the result of the nomination
| Award ceremony | Year | Category | Nominee / Work | Result | Ref. |
|---|---|---|---|---|---|
| Asia Artist Awards | 2026 | Popularity Award – Solo (Male) | Lee Chan-won | Pending | |
| Circle Chart Music Awards | 2021 | New Artist of the Year | Lee Chan-won | Won | |
| Circle Chart Music Awards | 2023 | Discovery of the Year | Lee Chan-won | Won | |
| Circle Chart Music Awards | 2024 | Genre of the Year – Trot | "Wish Lanterns" | Won | |
| The Fact Music Awards | 2023 | Best Music (Spring) | "Wish Lanterns" | Won | |
| The Fact Music Awards | 2026 | Fan N Star Choice Award – Solo | Lee Chan-won | Won | |
| The Fact Music Awards | 2026 | Best Music (Winter) | "Maybe Today" | Won | |
| Genie Music Awards | 2022 | Singer of the Year (Daesang) | Lee Chan-won | Nominated | |
| Genie Music Awards | 2022 | Genie Music Popularity Award | Lee Chan-won | Nominated | |
| Genie Music Awards | 2022 | Best Male Solo Artist | Lee Chan-won | Nominated | |
| Hanteo Music Awards | 2024 | Post Generation Award | Lee Chan-won | Won | |
| Hanteo Music Awards | 2024 | Trot | Lee Chan-won | Nominated | |
| KBS Entertainment Awards | 2021 | Rookie Award in Show/Variety Category | Immortal Songs: Singing the Legend | Nominated | |
| KBS Entertainment Awards | 2022 | Excellence Award in Show and Variety Category | Stars' Top Recipe at Fun-Staurant, Immortal Songs: Singing the Legend | Won | |
| KBS Entertainment Awards | 2023 | Top Excellence in Reality | Immortal Songs: Singing the Legend, Stars' Top Recipe at Fun-Staurant, Problem Child in House | Won | |
| KBS Entertainment Awards | 2024 | Entertainer of the Year | Lee Chan-won | Won | |
| KBS Entertainment Awards | 2024 | Grand Award (Daesang) | Lee Chan-won | Won | |
| KBS Entertainment Awards | 2025 | Entertainer of the Year | Lee Chan-won | Won | |
| KBS Entertainment Awards | 2025 | Grand Award (Daesang) | Lee Chan-won | Nominated | |
| Korea First Brand Award | 2023 | Trot-entertainer | Lee Chan-won | Won | |
| Korea Grand Music Awards | 2024 | Best Song | Lee Chan-won | Won | |
| Korea Grand Music Awards | 2024 | Best Adult Contemporary | Lee Chan-won | Won | |
| Korea Grand Music Awards | 2024 | DIGGUS Digging Artist | Lee Chan-won | Won | |
| Korea Grand Music Awards | 2024 | Lullua x Fancast Best Popularity | Lee Chan-won | Won | |
| Korea Grand Music Awards | 2024 | Trend of the Year (Trot) | Lee Chan-won | Won | |
| Seoul Music Awards | 2022 | Trot Award | Lee Chan-won | Nominated | |
| SPOTV K-Pop Awards | 2026 | Global Fan Choice Trot | Lee Chan-won | Won | |
| Universal Superstar Awards | 2024 | Universal Best Popularity (Male) | Lee Chan-won | Won | |
| Universal Superstar Awards | 2024 | Universal Trot Icon | Lee Chan-won | Won | |

=== State honors ===
Name of country, year given, and name of honor
| Country | Organization | Year | Honor or Award | Ref. |
|---|---|---|---|---|
| South Korea | Korean Popular Culture and Arts Awards (Note: Honors are given at the Korean Popular Culture and Arts Awards, arranged by the Korea Creative Content Agency and hosted by the Ministry of Culture, Sports and Tourism. They are awarded to those who have contributed to the arts and South Korea's pop culture.) | 2023 | Minister of Culture, Sports and Tourism | |
| South Korea | Newsis K-Expo Cultural Awards (Note: Co-sponsored by Korea's Ministry of Culture, Sports and Tourism, Ministry of Trade, Industry, and Energy, Korea Communications Commission, and Korea Creative Content Agency, it awards cultural icons and businesses that promote the sustainability of the Korean Wave and boost the industry's competitiveness.) | 2025 | Global Netizen Award | |

=== Listicles ===
Name of publisher, year listed, name of listicle, and placement
| Publisher | Year | List | Rank | Ref. |
|---|---|---|---|---|
| Forbes | 2023 | Korea Power Celebrity 40 | 16th | |
| Forbes | 2024 | Korea Power Celebrity 40 | 16th | |
| Forbes | 2025 | Korea Power Celebrity 40 | 16th | |
