= Isegye Idol =

South Korean Vtuber group

- Origin: South Korea
- Genre: K-pop
- Years active: 2021–present
- Members: Ine; Jingburger; Lilpa; Jururu; Gosegu; Viichan
- Website: Isegye Idol - Youtube; Waktaverse - Youtube

Isegye Idol (Korean: 이세계 아이돌; Hanja: 異世界 아이돌; RR: Isegye aidol; lit. Different world idol, Japanese: 異世界アイドル) is a virtual idol group in Korea. It was formed on August 26, 2021, with members selected through an audition organized by the live streamer Woowakgood. Afterwards, they debuted on December 17, 2021 with their first single "Re : Wind"

Their debut single "Re : Wind" was a success, charting at number one on Bugs and Gaon Download Chart. This was record-breaking, and unlike Adam or Ryu Sia, who were virtual singers in the 1990s, the power of fan mobilization is actually considered quite large.

== Career ==
=== Pre-debut ===
Isegye Idol started as a project just for fun. Internet broadcaster Woowakgood started an idol production project as the subscriber participation content they usually produce.

In the first audition, his ability as a singer was evaluated, and Woowakgood himself, Roentgenium, a permanent member of Woowakgood, and Dae Wol-hyang, who is active as a virtual streamer, participated as judges.

The final members were announced on 26 August 2021, and the final six members were selected.

=== 2021: Debut with "Re : Wind" ===
On December 17, 2021, the group made their debut with the release of their debut single "Re : Wind". The single set records for a virtual musical artist such as charting at number 80 on the Melon chart, and number one on Bugs and Gaon Download Chart.

On February 21, 2022, Gosegu became the first member in the group to surpass 100,000 subscribers on YouTube.

=== 2022: "Winter Spring" ===
On March 11, 2022, they released their second single, " Winter Spring ". The theme song "Winter Spring" is a K-pop ballad song about not losing hope even in the midst of anxiety that you will never see your loved one again. In the first week of March, dated March 6 to March 12, "Winter Spring" ranked first in downloads on Gaon Chart and third in most popular videos on YouTube.

On March 21, 2022, all the group members reached 100,000 YouTube subscribers after Jururu reached the milestone.

On April 2, 2022, Aine participated in rapper Genius Nochang's single, "Hollow Season".

== Discography ==
=== Single albums ===
- Isegye Festival (2023)

=== Singles ===
Title	Year	Peak chart positions	Album
Title	Year	KOR	Album
"Re : Wind"	2021	108	Non-album singles
"Winter Spring" (겨울봄)	2022	85	Non-album singles
"Lockdown"	2023	66	Non-album singles
"Another World"	2023	163	Non-album singles
"Kidding"	2023	56	Non-album singles
"Over"	2023	103	Isegye Festival
"Syzygy"	2025	190	Non-album singles
"Misty Rainbow"	2025	141	Non-album singles
"Stargazers"	2025	69	Be My Light
"Elevate"	2025	105	Be My Light
"Memory"	2025	109	Be My Light
"Be My Light"	2025	46	Be My Light
"Nameless"	2025	53	Be My Light
"Smile for You"	2026	63	Non-album single
"Rebels"	2026	58	Across Dimensions

=== Other charted songs ===
Title	Year	Peak chart positions	Album
Title	Year	KOR	Album
"Love Cell" (연애세포 (恋愛細胞))	2026	187	Across Dimensions
