= Mr. Trot =

South Korean television series

- Promotional poster for Season 1
- Hangul: 내일은 미스터트롯
- Lit.: Tomorrow Is Mister Trot
- RR: Naeireun Miseuteo Teurot
- MR: Naeirŭn Misŭt'ŏ T'ŭrot
- Genre: Talent show Reality television
- Written by: Season 1: Noh Yoon Park Yoon-joo Lee Kyung-ah Kim Seon-myung Kim Se-won Kim Shin-young Hwang Sung-hee Choi Se-young Kim Yi-seul Kim Seon-ho Go Hyun-jung Kim Soo-min Kim Min-soo Hwang Yeon-kyung; Season 2: Ahn Young-ran Yoo Eun-hye Kim Ah-reum Kwon Min-hee Ryu Min-ji Han Ji-ah Kim Hyo-jin Seo Young-joo Yoon Ji-woo Park Jung-ah Im Yi-rang Lee Ha-na Jeon Ji-young Lee Joo-yeon Kim Cho-rok Lee Ji-woo Lee Nan-joo Kim Chan-mi
- Directed by: Season 1: Son Seul-ji Im So-jung Lee Ja-eun Kim Do-young Ra Soo-bin Lee Sang-eun Yang Sung-young Jung Yoon-suk; Season 2: Jeon Hyung-joo Ra Soo-bin Lee Ja-eun Jung Yoon-suk Hyun Ji-in Kim Seo-hee Jung Joo-hye Jung Hye-jin Song Tae-heon Ji Joo-hee Oh Young-ran
- Presented by: Kim Sung-joo
- Judges: see 'List of masters'
- Opening theme: Season 1: Nest by Nam Jin; Season 2: Unconditionally by Park Sang-chul
- Country of origin: South Korea
- Original language: Korean
- No. of seasons: 3
- No. of episodes: 22

Production
- Executive producer: Season 2: Park Jae-yong
- Running time: 360 minutes
- Production company: Golden Eight Media

Original release
- Network: TV Chosun
- Release: January 2, 2020 – present

Mr. Trot (Korean: 내일은 미스터트롯) is a South Korean reality television and talent show. The show is the male version of the popular Miss Trot, an audition show for singers who perform trot music. It was produced with the planning intent of "a new concept trot audition program that will add firepower to the hot-tempered Korean trot craze and create a next-generation trot star that will lead the second trot heyday". It aired on TV Chosun every Thursday from January 2 to March 12, 2020.

Mr. Trot became one of the most popular shows on South Korean television. As of December 2020, it is the highest rated show in cable television history of South Korea. The show was followed by Korea's Next K-pop Star which aired beginning in October 2021 and widened the scope of music beyond trot while preserving the format and host of Miss and Mr. Trot.

In 2022, it was announced that Mr. Trot would be returning for its second season. The season aired its first episode on December 22, 2022 at 22:00 KST on TV Chosun.

== Broadcast ==
Season	Episode(s)	Air date	Air time (KST)	Running time
1	Aired on every Thursday			
1	1 – 11	January 2 – March 12, 2020	22:00 – 01:00	360 minutes
1	Aired on Saturday			
1	12	March 14, 2020	18:00 – 19:40	100 minutes
2	Air every Thursday			
2	1 – present	December 22, 2022 – present	22:00 – 01:00	360 minutes
2	Aired on Tuesday			
2	Special episode	January 10, 2023	22:00 – 01:00	360 minutes
3	Air every Thursday			
3	1 – present	December 19, 2024 – present	22:00 – 01:00	360 minutes

== Main host ==
=== Season 1 – 3 ===
- Kim Sung-joo

== List of masters ==
=== Season 1 ===
Season 1 masters
- Jang Yoon-jeong
- Jo Young-soo
- Noh Sa-yeon
- Lee Moo-song
- Jin Sung
- Park Hyun-bin
- Park Myeong-su
- Jang Young-ran
- Shin Ji
- Boom
- Kim Jun-su
- Kim Se-yeon
- Hyojung (Oh My Girl)

=== Season 2 ===
Season 2 masters

Legend:

– Present
– Absent

Name	Episodes no. & episode content															
Name	1	2	3	Special	3	4	5	5	6	7	8	9	10	11	12	13
Name	Preliminary Audition				Team Mission			Death Match (1 VS 1)			Medley Team Mission		Rival Match	TBA		
Jang Yoon-jeong													TBA			
Kim Yeon-ja													TBA			
Jin Sung													TBA			
Shin Ji													TBA			
Boom													TBA			
Lee Hong-gi													TBA			
A.Coma (Note: Though there is 2 judges in this group, however they will only represent one heart. Only if the both of them agreed to press the heart, the heart will then lighted up)													TBA			
Lee Hyun-woo													TBA			
Hong Ji-yoon													TBA			
Kang Daniel													TBA			
Chuu													TBA			
Lee Eun-ji													TBA			
Kim Hae-jun													TBA			
Kim Hee-jae													TBA			
Jang Min-ho													TBA			
Hyun Young													TBA			
Joo Young-hoon													TBA			
Eun Ga-eun													TBA			
Park Seon-joo													TBA			

=== Season 3 ===
Season 3 masters

Legend:

– Present
– Absent

Name	Episodes no. & episode content															
Name	1	2	3	Special 1	Special 2	3	4	5	6	7	8	9	10	11	12	13
Name	Preliminary Audition					Team Battle		1 VS 1 Death Match								
Senior Masters
Jang Min-ho																
Young Tak																
Lee Chan-won																
Jeong Dong-won																
Kim Hee-jae																
Ahn Sung-hoon																
Park Ji-hyeon																
Na Sang-do																
Jin Wook																
Park Sung-on																
National Masters
Jang Yoon-jeong																
Boom																
So Yi-hyun																
Xiumin (EXO)																
Lee Kyung-kyu																
Kim Yeon-ja																
Jin Sung																
Joo Young-hoon																
Lee Eun-ji																

== List of contestants ==
=== Season 1 ===
Season 1 contestants

- Go Jae-geun (고재근)
- Gu Ja-myeong (구자명)
- Kim Kyung-min (김경민)
- Kim Kyung-jin (김경진)
- Kim Dae-gyu (김대규)
- Kim Min-young (김민영)
- Kim Soo-chan (김수찬)
- Kim Jae-hyuk (김재혁)
- Kim Joong-yeon (김중연)
- Kim Tae-soo (김태수)
- Kim Tae-wan (김태완)
- Kim Ho-joong (김호중)
- Kim Hee-jae (김희재)
- Kim In-suk (김인석)
- Na Moo (나무)
- Na Tae-joo (나태주)
- Nam Seung-min (남승민)
- Roh Ji-hoon (노지훈)
- Dan Di (단디)
- Ra Eun (라온)
- Ryu Ji-kwang (류지광)
- Moon Jong-ho (문종호)
- Mr Boom Box (미스터 붐박스)
- Min Soo-hyun (민수현)
- Park Kyung-rae (박경래)
- Park Cheol-kyu (박철규)
- Sam Sik-yi (삼식이)
- Sam Chong-sa (삼총사)
- Sang Il (상일) (from the group Snuper)
- Seo Jae-won (서재원)
- Seong Yong-ha (성용하)
- So Yoo-chan (소유찬)
- Son Min-a (손민아)
- Son Woo-jin (손우진)
- Shin Seong (신성)
- Shin In-seon (신인선)
- Ahn Sung-hoon (안성훈)
- Ahn Hoon (안훈)
- Yang Ji-won (양지원)
- Yang Ji (영기)
- Young Tak (영탁)
- Yes Boys (예스보이즈)
- Oh Sam (오샘)
- Oh Seo-gil (오서길)
- Ok Jin-Wook (옥진욱)
- Yo Han-king (요한킹)
- Wi Myeong-sun (위명선)
- Yoo Ho (유호)
- Yoon Dae-man (윤대만)
- Lee Kwang-bok (이광복)
- Lee Do-jin (이도진)
- Lee Dae-won (이대원)
- Lee Soo-ho (이수호)
- Lee Il-min (이일민)
- Lee Jae-sik (이재식)
- Lee Chan-seong (이찬성)
- Lee Chan-won (이찬원)
- Lee Ha-pyeong (이하평)
- Im Do-hyung (임도형)
- Lim Young-woong (임영웅)
- Im Hyun-seo (임현서)
- Jang Min-ho (장민호)
- Jang Seung-jae (장영우)
- Jang Dae-kwan (장대관)
- Jeong Dong-won (정동원)
- Jung Ho (정호)
- Jung Seong-jae (정승제)
- Jo Ji-heum (조기흠)
- Jin Yi-hyung (진이형)
- Cha Soo-bin (차수빈)
- Chun Myung-hoon (천명훈) (from the group NRG)
- Chun Jae-won (천재원)
- Choi (초이) (from the group LU4US)
- Choi Sang (최상)
- Choi Yoon-ha (최윤하)
- Choi Dae-seong (최대성)
- Choi Jung-hoon (최정훈)
- Choi Hyun-sang (최현상)
- Chu Hyuk-jin (추혁진)
- Tae Hee (태희)
- Ha Dong-geun (하동근)
- Han Kang (한강)
- Han Yi-jae (한이재)
- Han Jae-yuk (한재욱)
- Han Ji-kang (한지강)
- Han Tae-ung (한태웅)
- Heo Min-young (허민영)
- Hong Yeo-seung (홍예성)
- Hong Jam-eon (홍잠언)
- Hwal Ji-chan (활기찬)
- Hwang Yoon-sung (황윤성) (from the group Romeo)
- Kang Tae-kan (강태관)
- Kang Hwa (강화)

=== Season 2 ===
Season 2 contestants

Contestant name	Contestant age (as of 2023)	Category
Kang Dae-sung (강대성)	13	Class President Department (반장부)
Kang Dae-woong (강대웅)	36	Active Duty Department A (현역부 A)
Kang Sung-ho (강성호)	35	Careerman Department A (직장부 A)
Kang Jae-soo (강재수)	30	University Department (대학부)
Kang Jin-chul (강진철)	27	National Team Representative Department (국가대표부)
Kang Dae-poong (강태풍)	32	University Department (대학부)
Kang Han (강한)	25	National Team Representative Department (국가대표부)
Go Kang-min (고강민)	45	Tenaciousness Department (독종부)
Go Jung-woo (고정우)	24	Age-agnostic Department (나이야 가라부)
Kwon Do-hoon (권도훈)	13	Boyhood Department (유소년부)
Gil Byung-min (길병민)	29	Different Genre Department (타장르부)
Kim Kyung-jin (김경진)	41	Careerman Department A (직장부 A)
Kim Da-on (김다운)	28	Different Genre Department (타장르부)
Kim Min-gon (김민건)	14	Class President Department (반장부)
Kim Min-jin (김민진)	48	Daddy Department (대디부)
Kim Seon-geun (김선근)	39	Careerman Department B (직장부 B)
Kim Seon-joon (김선준)	33	Active Duty Department B (현역부 B)
Kim Si-won (김시원)	37	National Team Representative Department (국가대표부)
Kim Young-ho (김영호)	34	Careerman Department B (직장부 B)
Kim Yong-seok (Cross Gene) (김용석)	30	Idol Department (아이돌부)
Kim Yong-pil (김용필)	48	Careerman Department B (직장부 B)
Kim Woong-jin (김웅진)	32	Careerman Department B (직장부 B)
Kim Hyun-min (김현민)	43	Different Genre Department (타장르부)
Kim Hong-jong (김홍종)	33	National Team Representative Department (국가대표부)
Na Sang-do (나상도)	38	Winning Department (우승부)
Nam Dong-hyun (남동현)	33	Careerman Department A (직장부 A)
Noh Young-hoon (노영훈)	27	National Team Representative Department (국가대표부)
Roh Ji-hoon (노지훈)	33	Active Duty Department A (현역부 A)
The Ray (더레이)	38	Different Genre Department (타장르부)
Dong Hae (동해)	42	Tenaciousness Department (독종부)
Marcus Kang (마커스 강)	31	Careerman Department B (직장부 B)
Moon Eun-seok (문은석)	24	Rising Star Department (샛별부)
Park Gon-woo (박건우)	34	Idol Department (아이돌부)
Park Do-hae (박도해)	31	Different Genre Department (타장르부)
Park Sang-bo (박상보)	35	Careerman Department A (직장부 A)
Park Sang-woo (박상우)	37	Careerman Department A (직장부 A)
Park Seo-jin (박서진)	28	Active Duty Department A (현역부 A)
Park Sung-on (박성온)	13	Boyhood Department (유소년부)
Park Se-wook (박세욱)	36	Winning Department (우승부)
Park Ji-hyeon (박지현)	28	University Department (대학부)
Park Jin-jong (박진종)	36	Daddy Department (대디부)
Seo Gon-hoo (서건후)	13	Class President Department (반장부)
Seo Woo-ri (서우리)	41	Active Duty Department B (현역부 B)
Seo Ji-yoo (서지유)	10	Boyhood Department (유소년부)
Sun Youl (Up10tion) (선율)	27	Idol Department (아이돌부)
Sung Ri (성리)	29	Idol Department (아이돌부)
Sung Min (성민)	37	Idol Department (아이돌부)
Sung Yoo-bin (성유빈)	36	Different Genre Department (타장르부)
Sung Hoon (성훈)	42	Careerman Department B (직장부 B)
Son Bin-ah (손빈아)	31	Active Duty Department A (현역부 A)
Son Hon-soo (손헌수)	43	Careerman Department A (직장부 A)
Song Do-hyun (송도현)	12	Boyhood Department (유소년부)
Song Min-joon (송민준)	27	Active Duty Department A (현역부 A)
Sleepy (슬리피)	39	Different Genre Department (타장르부)
Seung Guk-i (승국이)	35	Age-agnostic Department (나이야 가라부)
Shin Min-chul (신민철)	40	Different Genre Department (타장르부)
Ahn Sung-joon (안성준)	39	Winning Department (우승부)
Ahn Sung-hoon (안성훈)	34	Active Duty Department A (현역부 A)
Ahn Won-jung (안원중)	19	National Team Representative Department (국가대표부)
Young Kwang (영광)	23	Rising Star Department (샛별부)
Oh Jang-han (오장한)	50	Daddy Department (대디부)
Oh Joo-joo (K4) (오주주)	35	Winning Category (우승부)
Oh Chan-sung (오찬성)	24	Rising Star Department (샛별부)
Wang Joon (왕준)	38	Age-agnostic Department (나이야 가라부)
Yong Ho (용호)	31	Tenaciousness Department (독종부)
Won Hyuk (원혁)	35	Tenaciousness Department (독종부)
Yoo Sang-wook (유상욱)	30	Careerman Department B (직장부 B)
Yoon Dae-woong (윤대웅)	24	National Team Representative Department (국가대표부)
Yoon Joon-hyup (윤준협)	23	University Department (대학부)
Lee Dae-won (이대원)	32	Active Duty Department B (현역부 B)
Lee Do-jin (이도진)	34	Active Duty Department A (현역부 A)
Lee Sa-ya (The Bless) (이사야)	38	Age-agnostic Department (나이야 가라부)
Lee Sang-yeon (이상연)	28	Careerman Department B (직장부 B)
Lee Eun-ho (이은호)	38	Careerman Department B (직장부 B)
Lee Jin-gyu (이진규)	41	Tenaciousness Department (독종부)
Lee Chan-sung (이찬성)	31	Tenaciousness Department (독종부)
Lee Ha-joon (이하준)	37	Daddy Department (대디부)
Il Min (Note: Also known as Lee Il-min (이일민) from Season 1) (일민)	31	Active Duty Department B (현역부 B)
Lim Sung-wook (임성욱)	31	Careerman Department B (직장부 B)
Lim Chan (임찬)	29	Rising Star Department (샛별부)
Lim Chae-pyung (임채평)	26	University Department (대학부)
Jang Song-ho (장송호)	20	University Department (대학부)
Jang Hyun-wook (장현욱)	37	Careerman Department B (직장부 B)
Jae Ha (재하)	30	Winning Department (우승부)
Jeon Ji-ho (전기호)	12	Class President Department (반장부)
Jeon Myung-jin (전명진)	38	Careerman Department A (직장부 A)
Jung Dae-wang (Voisper) (정대왕)	27	Careerman Department A (직장부 A)
Jung Min-chan (정민찬)	35	National Team Representative Department (국가대표부)
Jung Ye-joon (정예준)	14	Boyhood Department (유소년부)
Jung Jae-wook (정재욱)	32	Careerman Department B (직장부 B)
Jung Hyung-chan (정형찬)	27	Tenaciousness Department (독종부)
Jo Seung-won (조승원)	10	Class President Department (반장부)
Joo Ah-sung (주아성)	41	Age-agnostic Department (나이야 가라부)
Jin Wook (진욱)	29	Rising Star Department (샛별부)
Jin Woong (진웅)	39	Daddy Department (대디부)
Jin Hae-sung (진해성)	33	Winning Department (우승부)
Cheon Jae-won (천재원)	37	Active Duty Department B (현역부 B)
Choi Dae-sung (최대성)	36	Daddy Department (대디부)
Choi Do-jin (The Bless) (최도진)	38	Age-agnostic Department (나이야 가라부)
Choi Soo-ho (최수호)	21	University Department (대학부)
Han Yi-jae (한이재)	29	Active Duty Department B (현역부 B)
Ha Dong-geun (하동근)	32	Active Duty Department B (현역부 B)
Chu Hyuk-jin (추혁진)	31	Active Duty Department B (현역부 B)
Choi Woo-jin (최우진)	32	Active Duty Department A (현역부 A)
Cha Soo-bin (차수빈)	37	Active Duty Department B (현역부 B)
Hwang Min-ho 황민호	10	Class President Department (반장부)
Tae Wook (태욱)	29	Rising Star Department (샛별부)
Hwang Min-woo (황민우)	18	Rising Star Department (샛별부)
Choi Jeon-seol (최전설)	30	Tenaciousness Department (독종부)
Han Jeong-soo (한정수)	50	Age-agnostic Department (나이야 가라부)
Hong Seung-min (홍승민)	18	Different Genre Department (타장르부)
Hwang Gi-dong (황기동)	40	Different Genre Department (타장르부)
Na Hwi (나휘)	38	Careerman Department A (직장부 A)
Choi Byung-yoon (최병윤)	40	Careerman Department A (직장부 A)
Choi Jae-yoo (최재유)	35	Careerman Department A (직장부 A)
Choi Ho-woo (최호우)	34	Careerman Department A (직장부 A)
Ha Tae-ha (하태하)	38	Idol Department (아이돌부)
Han Tae-i (한태이)	31	Idol Department (아이돌부)
Hwi Chan (휘찬)	35	Daddy Department (대디부)

== List of episodes ==
=== Season 1 ===
Season 1 episode details

==== Episodes 1 – 2: Introduction and 101-Contestant Master Audition ====
Each contestant performs in front of a panel of 13 judges. Each judge may award the contestant a "heart", signified by lighting up a heart-shaped display next to their chair.

Bold = Contestants who are able to advance to the next round.

Episode 1: Audition Performances
Group	Performance order	Contestant name	Song performed	Number of hearts awarded
University Department (대학부)	1	**Ok Jin-wook**	Finger Heart (손가락하트) _{[Orig. Roh Ji-hoon]}	12
University Department (대학부)	1	**Kim Tae-soo**	Give Me Back My Youth (청춘을 돌려다오)	13
University Department (대학부)	1	**Francis**	Hwagaejangteo Market (화개장터) _{[Orig. Jo Young-nam]}	9
University Department (대학부)	1	**Lee Il-min**	Woman from Casbah (카스바의 여인) _{[Orig. Yoon Hee-sung]}	11
University Department (대학부)	1	**Im Hyun-seo**	(골목길) _{[Orig. Shinchon Blues]}	12
University Department (대학부)	1	**Choi Yoon-ha**	(아내에게 바치는 노래) _{[Orig. Ha Soo-young]}	12
Boyhood Department (유소년부)	2	Han Tae-woong	(전선야곡 신세영) _{[Orig. Shin Se-young]}	10
Boyhood Department (유소년부)	2	**Jang Young-woo**	Road that Turns and Returns _{[Orig. Noh Sa-yeon]}	12
Boyhood Department (유소년부)	2	**Jeong Dong-won**	(보릿고개) _{[Orig. Jin Sung]}	13
Boyhood Department (유소년부)	2	**Hong Jam-eon**	(항구의 남자) _{[Orig. Park Sang-chul]}	13
Boyhood Department (유소년부)	2	**Im Do-hyeong**	(아참의 나라에서) _{[Orig. Kim Yeon-Ja]}	13
Careerman Department B (직장부 B)	3	Han Yi-jae	(당신의 좋아) _{[Orig. Nam Jin and Jang Yoon-Jeong]}	12

==== Episodes 3 – 4: Mission 1: Team Mission ====
The 48 remaining survivors of the first round of the tournament.

Episode 3
Group name Department name	Performance order	Contestant name	Song performed	Number of hearts received
Heo Min-young, I Cannot Forget You _{(허민영영 못 잊을 거야)} Active Category B _{(직장부 B)}	1	Na Moo; Han Kang; Heo Min-young	The Reason For Existence (존재의 이유) _{[Orig. Kim Jong-hwan]}	
Jang Min Tiger Butterfly _{(장민호랑나비)} Active Category A _{(직장부 B)}	2	Lim Young-woong; Shin Sung; Jang Minho; Young Ki; Young Tak; Shin In-sun	Dancing Queen (댄싱퀸) _{[Orig. Park Hyun-bin]}	All

Episode 4
Group name Department name	Performance order	Contestant name	Song performed	Number of hearts received
N.T.G; Idol Department _{(아이돌부)}	3	Hwang Yoon-sung; Chu Hyuk-jin; Cheon Myeong-hoon; Lee Do-jin; Choi Jeong-hoon; Kim Jung-yeon	I Like Saturday Night (토요일은 밤이 좋아) _{[Orig. Kim Jong-chan]}	All
Seung Min and National Grandsons _{(승민이와 국민손자)} Boyhood Department _{(유소년부)}	4	Nam Seung-min; Jeong Dong-won; Hong Jam-yeon; Im Do-hyung	Four Beats (네박자) _{[Orig. Song Dae-kwan]}	11
Four Wheel Drive _{(사륜구동)} Different Genre Department _{(타장르부)}	5	Kang Tae-kwan; Mr Boom Box; Go Jae-geun; Kang Ho-jung	2 to 8 (2대8) _{[Orig. Lee Bum-hak]}	All

==== Episodes 4 – 6: Mission 2 - Death Match (1 VS 1) ====
In the second round of the tournament., 30 survivors remain.

– Contestant won.
– Contestant lost.

Episode 4: 1 VS 1 Match
Performance order	Contestants			Song performed		Number of hearts received	
1	Young Tak	VS	Chun Myung-hoon	(막걸리 한잔) _{[Orig. Kang Jin]}	(가라지) _{[Orig. Na Hoon-a]}	7	4

Episode 5: 1 VS 1 Match
Performance order	Contestants			Song performed		Number of hearts received	
2	**Chu Hyuk-jin**	VS	Kim Hee-jae	(서울 시스터즈) _{[Orig. Chut Cha]}	(꽃을 든 남자) _{[Orig. Choi Seok-jun]}	0	11
3	Yang Gi	VS	Na Tae-ju	(동전인생) _{[Orig. Jin Sung]}	You Are My Man (너는 내남자) _{[Orig. Han Hye-jin]}	3	8
4	Kim Jung-yeon	VS	Yang Ji-won	(이름 모른 소녀) _{[Orig. Kim Jung-ho]}	(미욱인지 그리움인지) _{[Orig. Choi Yoo-na]}	6	5
6	Nam Seung-min	VS	Jeong Dong-won	(사모) _{[Orig. Na Hoon-a]}	(눈물의 씨앗) _{[Orig. Na Hoon-a]}	1	10
6	Mr Boom Box	VS	Shin In-sun	(선녀와 나뭇꾼) _{[Orig. Kim Chang-nam]}	Redevelopment of Love (사랑의 재개발) _{[Orig. Yoo San-seul]}	1	10
7	Ryu Ji-kwang	VS	Lim Young-woong	I Will Give You Everything (나 그대에게 모두 드리리) _{[Orig. Lee Jang-hee]}	(일편단심 민들레야) _{[Orig. Cho Yong-pil]}	2	8

Episode 6: 1 VS 1 Match
Performance order	Contestants			Song performed		Number of hearts received	
8	Kim Kyung-min	VS	Shin Sung	(가지마) _{[Orig. Jin Sung]}	(녹슬은 기차역) _{[Orig. Na Hoon-a]}	8	3
9	Hwang Yoon-sung	VS	Ok Jin-yuk	(동반자) _{[Orig. Tae Jin-ah]}	(자옥아) _{[Orig. Park Sang-cheol]}	9	2
10	Lee Do-jin	VS	Kang Tae-kan	(사랑의 미로) _{[Orig. Choi Jin-hee]}	(당신의 눈물) _{[Orig. Tae Jin-ah]}	3	8
11	Roh Ji-hoon	VS	Kim Soo-chan	(당신) _{[Orig. Kim Jung-soo]}	(노래하며 춤추며) _{[Orig. Kye Eun-sook]}	7	4
12	Ahn Sung-hoon	VS	Lee Chan-won	(아씨) _{[Orig. Lee Mi-ja]}	(울긴 왜울어) _{[Orig. Na Hoon-a]}	1	10
13	Choi Jeong-hoon	VS	Go Jae-geun	(사랑의 불시착) _{[Orig. Park Nam-jung]}	(사랑해 말도 못하는) _{[Orig. Lee Chang-yong]}	5	6
14	Jang Minho	VS	Kim Ho-joong	(님) _{[Orig. Kim Jung-ho]}	(무정 부르스) _{[Orig. Kang Seung-mo]}	4	7
15	Choi Dae-seong	VS	Lee Dae-won	(거짓말) _{[Orig. Cho Hang-jo]}	(대세남) _{[Orig. Seung Guk-lee]}	3	8

==== Episode 7 – 8: Mission 3 ====
===== Round 1 =====
In this round, at the end of every groups' performance, the 10 masters will give their grading, with 100 marks as the full mark. On the other hand, the 500 audiences will be able to donate at most 1 million won to each of the group. Donation of 1 million won will be equivalent to 1 mark counted to the teams' marks. The money, in the end, will be donated to the children in need.

Episode 7: Trot Aid (Group Match)
Group name	Performance order	Contestants	Song performed	Score			Ranking
Group name	Performance order	Contestants	Song performed	Master	Audience	Total	Ranking
뽕다발	1	Lim Young-woong; Hwang Yoon-sung; Kang Tae-kan; Ryu Ji-kwang	(사랑밖엔 난 몰라) _{[Orig. Sim Soo-bong]}	954	211.4	1168.4	2
뽕다발	1	Lim Young-woong; Hwang Yoon-sung; Kang Tae-kan; Ryu Ji-kwang	(베사메무쵸) _{[Orig. Hyun In]}	954	211.4	1168.4	2
뽕다발	1	Lim Young-woong; Hwang Yoon-sung; Kang Tae-kan; Ryu Ji-kwang	In 10 minutes (10분 내로) _{[Orig. Kim Yeon-ja]}	954	211.4	1168.4	2
뽕다발	1	Lim Young-woong; Hwang Yoon-sung; Kang Tae-kan; Ryu Ji-kwang	Gonderae Manderae (곤드레 만드레) _{[Orig. Park Hyun-bin]}	954	211.4	1168.4	2
뽕다발	1	Lim Young-woong; Hwang Yoon-sung; Kang Tae-kan; Ryu Ji-kwang	(한오백년) _{[Orig. Cho Yong-pil]}	954	211.4	1168.4	2
뽕다발	1	Lim Young-woong; Hwang Yoon-sung; Kang Tae-kan; Ryu Ji-kwang	(멋진 인생) _{[Orig. Park Jung-sik]}	954	211.4	1168.4	2
사형제	2	Young Tak; Ahn Sung-hoon; Kim Soo-chan; Nam Seung-min	1234 _{[Orig. Park Yoon-kyung]}	939	172.8	1111.8	4
사형제	2	Young Tak; Ahn Sung-hoon; Kim Soo-chan; Nam Seung-min	(여자의 일생) _{[Orig. Lee Mi-ja]}	939	172.8	1111.8	4
사형제	2	Young Tak; Ahn Sung-hoon; Kim Soo-chan; Nam Seung-min	(울엄마) _{[Orig. Jin Sung]}	939	172.8	1111.8	4
사형제	2	Young Tak; Ahn Sung-hoon; Kim Soo-chan; Nam Seung-min	(부초 같은 인생) _{[Orig. Kim Yong-im]}	939	172.8	1111.8	4
사형제	2	Young Tak; Ahn Sung-hoon; Kim Soo-chan; Nam Seung-min	(뿐이고) _{[Orig. Park Gu-yoon]}	939	172.8	1111.8	4
사랑과 정열	3	Shin In-seon; Na Tae-joo; Lee Dae-won	(사랑아) _{[Orig. Jang Yoon-jeong]}	976	173.8	1149.8	3
사랑과 정열	3	Shin In-seon; Na Tae-joo; Lee Dae-won	(나무꾼) _{[Orig. Park Gu-yoon]}	976	173.8	1149.8	3
사랑과 정열	3	Shin In-seon; Na Tae-joo; Lee Dae-won	(옥경이) _{[Orig. Tae Jin-ah]}	976	173.8	1149.8	3
사랑과 정열	3	Shin In-seon; Na Tae-joo; Lee Dae-won	Oppa, I Trust You (오빠만 믿어) _{[Orig. Park Hyun-bin]}	976	173.8	1149.8	3
패밀리가 떴다	4	Lee Chan-won; Jeong Dong-won; Go Jae-geun; Kim Ho-joong	(백세인생) _{[Orig. Kim Ae-ran]}	976	217.8	1193.8	1
패밀리가 떴다	4	Lee Chan-won; Jeong Dong-won; Go Jae-geun; Kim Ho-joong	Youth (청춘) _{[Orig. Sanulrim]}	976	217.8	1193.8	1
패밀리가 떴다	4	Lee Chan-won; Jeong Dong-won; Go Jae-geun; Kim Ho-joong	(고장난 벽시계) _{[Orig. Na Hoon-a]}	976	217.8	1193.8	1
패밀리가 떴다	4	Lee Chan-won; Jeong Dong-won; Go Jae-geun; Kim Ho-joong	(다함께 차차차) _{[Orig. Sul Woon-do]}	976	217.8	1193.8	1
패밀리가 떴다	4	Lee Chan-won; Jeong Dong-won; Go Jae-geun; Kim Ho-joong	(젊은 그대) _{[Orig. Kim Soo-chul]}	976	217.8	1193.8	1
패밀리가 떴다	4	Lee Chan-won; Jeong Dong-won; Go Jae-geun; Kim Ho-joong	(희망가) _{[Orig. Unknown artist]}	976	217.8	1193.8	1

Episode 8: Group Match
Group name	Performance order	Contestants	Song performed	Score			Ranking
Group name	Performance order	Contestants	Song performed	Master	Audience	Total	Ranking
트롯신사단	5	Jang Minho; Kim Kyung-min; Kim Joong-yeon; Roh Ji-hoon	(꽃) _{[Orig. Jang Yoon-jeong]}	933	116.8	1049.8	5
트롯신사단	5	Jang Minho; Kim Kyung-min; Kim Joong-yeon; Roh Ji-hoon	(사랑만은 않겠어요) _{[Orig. Yoon Soo-il]}	933	116.8	1049.8	5
트롯신사단	5	Jang Minho; Kim Kyung-min; Kim Joong-yeon; Roh Ji-hoon	The Woman in the Rain (빗속의 여인) _{[Orig. Kim Gun-mo]}	933	116.8	1049.8	5
트롯신사단	5	Jang Minho; Kim Kyung-min; Kim Joong-yeon; Roh Ji-hoon	(홍도야 울지마라) _{[Orig. Na Hoon-a]}	933	116.8	1049.8	5
트롯신사단	5	Jang Minho; Kim Kyung-min; Kim Joong-yeon; Roh Ji-hoon	About Romance (낭만에 대하여) _{[Orig. Choi Baek-ho]}	933	116.8	1049.8	5

===== Round 2 =====
Episode 8: Team Fight
Group name	Performance order	Contestants	Song performed	Score			Ranking
Group name	Performance order	Contestants	Song performed	Master	Audience	Total	Ranking
뽕다발	1	Lim Young-woong	(어느 60대 노부부 이야기) _{[Orig. Kim Kwang-seok]}	934	435	1369	1
사형제	2	Kim Soo-chan	Napal Baji (나팔바지) _{[Orig. PSY]}	920	418	1338	2
사형제	2	Kim Soo-chan	Amor Fati (아모르 파티) _{[Orig. Kim Yeon-ja]}	920	418	1338	2
트롯신사단	3	Roh Ji-hoon	(어쩌다 마주친 그대) _{[Orig. Songgolmae]}	902	381	1283	3
사랑과 정열	4	Shin In-seon	(창밖의 여자) _{[Orig. Cho Yong-pil]}	905	329	1234	5
패밀리가 떴다	5	Kim Ho-joong	(천상재회) _{[Orig. Choi Jin-hee]}	890	356	1246	4

Final result for 3rd Mission
Group name	Total score	Ranking	Advanced contestant	Eliminated contestant
뽕다발	2537.4	1	Lim Young-woong; Hwang Yoon-sung; Kang Tae-kan; Ryu Ji-kwang	None
사형제	2449.8	2	Young Tak; Kim Soo-chan	Nam Seung-min; Ahn Sung-hoon
트롯신사단	2332.8	5	Jang Minho; Kim Kyung-min	Kim Jung-yeon; Roh Ji-hoon
사랑과 정열	2383.8	4	Shin In-seon; Kim Hee-jae; Na Tae-joo	Lee Dae-won
패밀리가 떴다	2439.8	3	Kim Ho-joong; Lee Chan-won; Jeong Dong-won	Go Jae-geun

==== Episode 8 – 10: Semi-Final Mission ====
===== 1st Round: Individual Match (Legend Mission) =====
Episode 8: Individual Match
Contestants	Performance order	Song performed	Score				Ranking
Contestants	Performance order	Song performed	Master	National vote	Audience	Total	Ranking
Jeong Dong-won	1	(우수) _{[Orig. Nam Jin]}	925	470	249	1644	4

Episode 9: Individual Match
Contestants	Performance order	Song performed	Score				Ranking
Contestants	Performance order	Song performed	Master	National vote	Audience	Total	Ranking
Kim Kyung-min	2	(춘자야) _{[Orig. Sul Woon-do]}	911	370	238	1519	10
Shin In-seon	3	(쌈바의 여인) _{[Orig. Sul Woon-do]}	928	410	264	1602	7
Ryu Ji-kwang	4	(사랑하며 살 테요) _{[Orig. Nam Jin]}	905	380	172	1457	12
Lee Chan-won	5	(잃어버린 30년) _{[Orig. Sul Woon-do]}	916	480	238	1634	5
Kim Hee-jae	6	(사랑은 어디에) _{[Orig. Nam Jin]}	888	440	193	1521	9
Jang Minho	7	(상사화) _{[Orig. Nam Jin]}	944	460	263	1667	3
Young Tak	8	(추억으로 가는 당신) _{[Orig. Joo Hyun-mi]}	952	490	268	1710	2
Na Tae-joo	9	(신사동 그 사람) _{[Orig. Joo Hyun-mi]}	902	420	164	1486	11
Kim Ho-joong	10	(짝사랑) _{[Orig. Joo Hyun-mi]}	914	450	164	1528	8
Lim Young-woong	11	(보라빛 엽서) _{[Orig. Sul Woon-do]}	962	500	256	1718	1

Episode 10: Individual Match
Contestants	Performance order	Song performed	Score				Ranking
Contestants	Performance order	Song performed	Master	National vote	Audience	Total	Ranking
Kim Soo-chan	12	(첫정) _{[Orig. Joo Hyun-mi]}	932	430	261	1623	6
Kang Tae-kan	13	(정말 좋았네) _{[Orig. Joo Hyun-mi]}	879	400	168	1447	13
Hwang Yoon-sung	14	(빨간 립스틱) _{[Orig. Sul Woon-do]}	870	390	181	1441	14

===== 2nd Round: 1 VS 1 (Duet Match) =====
Episode 10: 1 VS 1 Match
Performance order	Contestants			Song performed	Score		
Performance order	Contestants			Song performed	Master	Audience	Total
1	Lee Chan-won	VS	Na Tae-joo	(남자다잉) _{[Orig. Nam Jin]}	300 : 0	171 : 117	471 : 117
2	Ryu Ji-kwang	VS	Kim Ho-joong	(다시 한번만) _{[Orig. Sul Woon-do]}	60 : 240	105 : 188	165 : 428
3	Kim Kyung-min	VS	Hwang Yoon-sung	(누이) _{[Orig. Sul Woon-do]}	210 : 90	130 : 155	340 : 245
4	Jeong Dong-won	VS	Jang Minho	(파트너) _{[Orig. Nam Jin]}	210 : 90	145 : 147	355 : 237
5	Kim Soo-chan	VS	Lim Young-woong	(울면서 후회하네) _{[Orig. Joo Hyun-mi]}	0 : 300	95 : 195	95 : 495
6	Kang Tae-kan	VS	Kim Hee-jae	(나만의 여인) _{[Orig. Sul Woon-do]}	90 : 210	100 : 183	190 : 393
7	Shin In-seon	VS	Young Tak	(또 만났네요) _{[Orig. Joo Hyun-mi]}	90 : 210	113 : 182	203 : 392

– Contestant advance to next mission.
– Contestant lost.

Final result for Semi-Final Mission
Name	1st round		2nd round		Total score	Audience score	Final ranking
Name	Score	Ranking	Score	Ranking	Total score	Audience score	Final ranking
Lim Young-woong	1718	1	495	1	2213	451	1
Lee Chan-won	1634	5	471	2	2105	409	2
Young Tak	1710	2	392	5	2102	381	3
Jeong Dong-won	1644	4	355	6	1999	394	4
Kim Ho-joong	1528	8	428	3	1956	352	5
Kim Hee-jae	1521	9	393	4	1914	293	6
Jang Minho	1677	3	237	9	1904	410	7
Kim Kyung-min	1519	10	340	7	1859	448	8
Shin In-seon	1602	7	340	10	1805	446	9
Kim Soo-chan	1623	6	95	14	1718	356	10
Hwang Yoon-sung	1441	14	245	8	1686	336	11
Kang Tae-kan	1447	13	200	11	1647	351	12
Ryu Ji-kwang	1457	12	165	12	1622	277	13
Na Tae-joo	1486	11	117	13	1603	281	14

==== Episode 12: Final Missions ====
Final result
Contestants	Song performed		Total (50%)	Online voting (20%)	Real-time voting (30%)	Total score (100%)	Ranking	Title
Contestants	Round 1	Round 2	Total (50%)	Online voting (20%)	Real-time voting (30%)	Total score (100%)	Ranking	Title
Lim Young-woong	925	965	1890	800	1200.00 (1,374,748 votes)	3890.00	1st	진(眞)
YoungTak	947	935	1882	780	863.30 (989,020 votes)	3525.30	2nd	선(善)
Lee Chan-won	941	976	1917	790	745.08 (853,576 votes)	3452.08	3rd	미(美)
Kim Ho-joong	898	950	1848	760	636.15 (728,792 votes)	3244.15	4th	
Jeong Dong-won	914	935	1849	770	596.25 (683,077 votes)	3215.25	5th	
Jang Min-ho	908	924	1832	750	525.40 (601,912 votes)	3107.40	6th	
Kim Hee-jae	910	939	1849	740	172.64 (197,775 votes)	2761.64	7th	

=== Season 2 ===
Season 2 episode details

Each contestant performs in front of a panel of 15 judges. Each judge may award the contestant a "heart", signified by lighting up a heart-shaped display next to their chair.

The judging criteria for Season 2 preliminary match (mentioned at the start of Season 2 Episode 1) is as follows:

- For contestant who had received 8 hearts and below will automatically be eliminated from the audition.
- For contestants who had received within 9 to 15 hearts will temporarily advance to the next round of the audition.
- For contestants who had received "All Heart (which is equivalent to 15 hearts)" will automatically be able to advance to the next round of the audition.

Legend:

- **Bold =** Contestants who are able to advance to the next round.
- **<Preliminary Audition>** Top 3 position box colour code:
  - – **1st Place: 진(眞)**
  - – **2nd Place: 선(善)**
  - – **3rd Place: 미(美)**

After the <Preliminary Audition> had ended, a total of 73 contestants were able to move on to the next round.

==== Episodes 1 – 3: Introduction and 119-Contestants Master Audition ====
Episode 1: Preliminary Audition Performances Part 1
Department name	Performance order (By department)	Contestant name	Song performed	Number of hearts awarded
University Department (대학부)	1	**Choi Soo-ho**	Putting Away (갈무리) _{[Orig. Na Hoon-a]}	15 (All Heart)
University Department (대학부)	1	**Kang Tae-poong**	Free (공짜) _{[Orig. Kang Jin]}	15 (All Heart)
University Department (대학부)	1	**Park Ji-hyeon**	Foolish Person (못난 놈) _{[Orig. Jin Sung]}	15 (All Heart)
University Department (대학부)	1	**Jang Song-ho**	Rainy Gomoryeong (비 내리는 고모령) _{[Orig. Hyun In]}	15 (All Heart)
University Department (대학부)	1	**Yoon Joon-hyup**	Casanova (카사노바) _{[Orig. Jang Yoon-jeong]}	15 (All Heart)
Boyhood Department (유소년부)	2	**Song Do-hyun**	Age, Go Away (나이야가라) _{[Orig. Kim Yong-im]}	15 (All Heart)
Boyhood Department (유소년부)	2	**Seo Ji-yoo**	Fly Away Freely (훨훨훨) _{[Orig. Lee Young-hee]}	15 (All Heart)
Boyhood Department (유소년부)	2	Jung Ye-joon	A Lumberjack (나무꾼) _{[Orig. Park Ku-yoon]}	14
Boyhood Department (유소년부)	2	**Park Sung-on**	Mother (어매) _{[Orig. Na Huna]}	15 (All Heart)
Tenaciousness Department (독종부)	3	**Go Kang-min**	Dongbaek Agassi (동백 아가씨) _{[Orig. Lee Mi-ja]}	15 (All Heart)
Tenaciousness Department (독종부)	3	**Lee Chan-sung**	Is Love Like This (사랑이 이런 건가요) _{[Orig. Sul Woon-do]}	15 (All Heart)
Tenaciousness Department (독종부)	3	**Won Hyuk**	Love That Makes Me Live (나를 살게하는 사랑) _{[Orig. Geum Jan-di]}	15 (All Heart)
Tenaciousness Department (독종부)	3	Lee Jin-gyu	Wonderful Confession (황홀한 고백) _{[Orig. Yoon Soo-il]}	12
Tenaciousness Department (독종부)	3	**Yong Ho**	Your Tear (당신의 눈물) _{[Orig. Tae Jin-ah]}	15 (All Heart)
Tenaciousness Department (독종부)	3	Jung Hyung-chan	Open the Door (문을여시오) _{[Orig. Im Chang-jung]}	14
Active Duty Department A (현역부 A)	4	**Choi Woo-jin**	Flattering Bird (아미새) _{[Orig. Hyun Chul]}	15 (All Heart)
Active Duty Department A (현역부 A)	4	**Song Min-joon**	A Ship Going Home (고향으로 가는 배) _{[Orig. Oh Jin-il]}	15 (All Heart)
Active Duty Department A (현역부 A)	4	**Park Seo-jin**	Red Lips (붉은 입술) _{[Orig. Na Huna]}	15 (All Heart)

Episode 2: Preliminary Audition Performances Part 2
Department name	Performance order (By department)	Contestant name	Song performed	Number of hearts awarded
Rising Star Department (샛별부)	5	**Young Kwang**	Oh, That's Good (아이 좋아라) _{[Orig. Lee Hae-ri]}	15 (All Heart)
Rising Star Department (샛별부)	5	**Hwang Min-woo**	Friend from Yeongil Bay (영일만 친구) _{[Orig. Choi Beak-ho]}	14
Rising Star Department (샛별부)	5	**Jin Wook**	Cane (회초리) _{[Orig. Jang Min-ho]}	15 (All Heart)
Rising Star Department (샛별부)	5	**Lim Chan** (Note: His part was only aired partially on ep. 2. His full preliminary audition was aired on special episode)	You Can Go (가라지) _{[Orig. Na Huna]}	15 (All Heart)
Rising Star Department (샛별부)	5	Moon Eun-seok	Preliminary stage not aired	13
Rising Star Department (샛별부)	5	Tae Wook	Preliminary stage not aired	13
Idol Department (아이돌부)	6	**Park Gon-woo**	Blunt (무뚝뚝) _{[Orig. Jang Min-ho]}	15 (All Heart)
Idol Department (아이돌부)	6	Sung Min	A Glass of Life (한 잔의 인생) _{[Orig. Lee Kyung]}	11
Idol Department (아이돌부)	6	Sun Youl	Unrequited Love (짝사랑) _{[Orig. Joo Hyun-mi]}	14
Class President Department (반장부)	7	**Jo Seung-won**	Father's River (아버지의 강) _{[Orig. Lee Tae-ho]}	15 (All Heart)
Class President Department (반장부)	7	Kang Dae-sung	YOLO YOLO (욜로욜로) _{[Orig. Nam Seung-min]}	14
Class President Department (반장부)	7	**Hwang Min-ho**	You Are (님이여) _{[Orig. Jung Eui-song]}	15 (All Heart)
Active Duty Department A (현역부 A)	8	**Son Bin-ah**	The Girl Removing Make-up (화장을 지우는) _{[Orig. Kang Jin]}	15 (All Heart)
Active Duty Department A (현역부 A)	8	**Roh Ji-hoon**	Jang Nok-soo (장녹수) _{[Orig. Jeon Mi-kyung]}	15 (All Heart)
Active Duty Department A (현역부 A)	8	**Ahn Sung-hoon**	The Terminal Wet in the Rain (비에 젖은 터미널) _{[Orig. Joo Hyun-mi]}	15 (All Heart)
Active Duty Department A (현역부 A)	8	**Lee Do-jin** (Note: His part was re-aired on the special episode along with the master's unaired comments)	Mother (어매) _{[Orig. Na Huna]}	15 (All Heart)
National Team Representative Department (국가대표부)	9	Noh Young-hoon	Woman from Casbah (카스바의 여인) _{[Orig. Yoon Hee-sang]}	14
National Team Representative Department (국가대표부)	9	**Jung Min-chan**	Dora Dora (도라도라) _{[Orig. Jin Si-mon]}	15 (All Heart)
National Team Representative Department (국가대표부)	9	Ahn Won-joong	The Woman of Samba (쌈바의 여인) _{[Orig. Sul Woon-do]}	13
National Team Representative Department (국가대표부)	9	**Yoon Dae-woong**	Amor Fati (아모르 파티) _{[Orig. Kim Yeon-ja]}	14
Winning Department (우승부)	10	**Jae Ha**	Bay Guy (나쁜 남자) _{[Orig. Shin Yoo]}	14
Winning Department (우승부)	10	**Ahn Sung-joon**	With My Love (임과 함께) _{[Orig. Nam Jin]}	14
Winning Department (우승부)	10	**Jin Hae-sung**	Times of Maternal Love (모정의 세월) _{[Orig. Han Se-il]}	14
Winning Department (우승부)	10	**Na Sang-do**	Man's Life (남자의 인생) _{[Orig. Na Huna]}	15 (All Heart)
Winning Department (우승부)	10	**Park Se-wook**	Rain of Tears (눈물비) _{[Orig. Eun Jung]}	15 (All Heart)

Episode 3: Preliminary Audition Performances Part 3
Department name	Performance order (By department)	Contestant name	Song performed	Number of hearts awarded
Active Duty Department B (현역부 B)	11	Ha Dong-geun	Dear Love (사랑님) _{[Orig. Kim Yong-im]}	15 (All Heart)
Active Duty Department B (현역부 B)	11	Choo Hyuk-jin	Risky (아슬아슬) _{[Orig. Jin Si-mon]}	15 (All Heart)
Different Genre Department (타장르부)	12	Hong Seung-min	Mother's Song (엄마의 노래) _{[Orig. Shin Kang-woo]}	14
Different Genre Department (타장르부)	12	Gil Byung-min	The Love that Followed the Leaves (낙엽 따라 가버린 사랑) _{[Orig. Cha Joong-rak]}	14
Age-agnostic Department (나이야 가라부)	13	**Wang Joon**	Dream Again (아이라예) _{[Orig. Na Huna]}	15 (All Heart)
Age-agnostic Department (나이야 가라부)	13	**Go Jung-woo**	Chaeseokgang Cliffs (채석강) _{[Orig. Jin Sung]}	15 (All Heart)
Careerman Department B (직장부 B)	14	Kim Seon-geun	Nest (둥지) _{[Orig. Nam Jin]}	10
Careerman Department B (직장부 B)	14	Marcus Kang	A Song Dedicated to One's Wife (아내에게 바치는 노래) _{[Orig. Ha Soo-young]}	14
Careerman Department B (직장부 B)	14	Yoo Sang-wook	So Hot! (앗! 뜨거) _{[Orig. Park Hyun-bin]}	10
Careerman Department B (직장부 B)	14	**Kim Yong-pil**	About Romance (낭만에 대하여) _{[Orig. Choi Beak-ho]}	15 (All Heart)
List of contestants who made it to the next round, but their preliminary stages were not aired
Daddy Department (대디부)	—N/a	**Lee Ha-joon**	Preliminary stage not aired	14
Age-agnostic Department (나이야 가라부)	—N/a	**Seung Guk-i**	Preliminary stage not aired	13
Active Duty Department A (현역부 A)	—N/a	**Kang Dae-woong**	Preliminary stage not aired	14
Active Duty Department B (현역부 B)	—N/a	**Cheon Jae-won**	Preliminary stage not aired	Result not shown
Careerman Department (직장부)	—N/a	**Park Sang-woo**	Preliminary stage not aired	14
Careerman Department (직장부)	—N/a	**Lee Sang-yeon**	Preliminary stage not aired	11
Idol Department (아이돌부)	—N/a	**Sung Ri**	Preliminary stage not aired	14

==== Special episode: Un-aired "All Hearts" Special ====
The special episode was aired on January 10, 2023 on a Tuesday.

In this episode, those contestants who although manage to achieve "All Hearts" from the 15 judges but their parts were not aired on the regular broadcast will be all featured in this episode.

Special episode: Un-aired "All Hearts" Special
Department name	Performance order (By contestant)	Contestant name	Song performed	Number of hearts awarded
Active Duty Department A (현역부 A)	1	Han Yi-jae	Mother Flower (엄마꽃) _{[Orig. Ahn Sung-hoon]}	15 (All Heart)
Active Duty Department B (현역부 B)	2	Lee Dae-won	Hallyang-ga (한량가) _{[Orig. Young Tak]}	15 (All Heart)
Active Duty Department B (현역부 B)	3	Il Min	Life of a Woman (여자의 일생) _{[Orig. Lee Mi-ja]}	15 (All Heart)
Active Duty Department B (현역부 B)	4	Jeon Jae-won	Life (인생) _{[Orig. Ryu Gye-young]}	15 (All Heart)
Active Duty Department A (현역부 A)	5	Lee Do-jin	Mother (어매) _{[Orig. Na Huna]}	15 (All Heart)
Tenaciousness Department (독종부)	6	Choi Jeon-seol	Your Lantern (님의 등불) _{[Orig. Jin Sung]}	15 (All Heart)
Rising Star Department (샛별부)	7	Oh Chan-sung	Heartless Person (무정한 사람) _{[Orig. Sung Min-ho]}	15 (All Heart)
Rising Star Department (샛별부)	8	Lim Chan	You Can Go (가라지) _{[Orig. Na Huna]}	15 (All Heart)
Boyhood Department (유소년부)	9	Kwon Do-hoon	Like A Fool (바보 같지만) _{[Orig. Park Sang-chul [[[:ko:박상철 (가수)|ko]]]]}	15 (All Heart)
Class President Department (반장부)	10	Kim Min-gon	Black Rubber Shoes (검정고무신) _{[Orig. Han Dong-yeob]}	15 (All Heart)
Class President Department (반장부)	11	Seo Gon-hoo	Hallyang-ga (한량가) _{[Orig. Young Tak]}	15 (All Heart)
National Team Representative Department (국가대표부)	12	Kim Si-won	Hoeryeongpo (회룡포) _{[Orig. Kang Min-joo]}	15 (All Heart)
National Team Representative Department (국가대표부)	13	Kim Hong-jong	Two Wheels (두 바퀴) _{[Orig. Park Gu-yoon]}	15 (All Heart)
Daddy Department (대디부)	14	Choi Dae-sung	You are the Best (아따 고것참) _{[Orig. Wink]}	15 (All Heart)
Daddy Department (대디부)	15	Jin Woong	Love In Dreams (꿈속의 사랑) _{[Orig. Hyun In]}	15 (All Heart)
Daddy Department (대디부)	16	Kim Min-jin	Lover (애인) _{[Orig. Tae Jin-ah]}	15 (All Heart)
Winning Department (우승부)	17	Park Se-wook	Rain of Tears (눈물비) _{[Orig. Eun Jung]}	15 (All Heart)
University Department (대학부)	18	Kang Jae-soo	I Pray (기도합니다) _{[Orig. Jin Sung]}	15 (All Heart)
University Department (대학부)	19	Lim Chae-pyung	Moon of Seoul (서울의 달) _{[Orig. Song Ga-in]}	15 (All Heart)
Different Genre Department (타장르부)	20	Sung Yoo-bin	Thick Lipstick (립스틱 짙게 바르고) _{[Orig. Lim Joo-ri]}	15 (All Heart)
Different Genre Department (타장르부)	21	Sleepy	I'll Treat You (돈은 내가 낼게요) _{[Orig. Young Ji [[[:ko:영지 (가수)|ko]]]]}	15 (All Heart)
Different Genre Department (타장르부)	22	The Ray	Brother Tess! (테스형!) _{[Orig. Na Huna]}	15 (All Heart)
Different Genre Department (타장르부)	23	Hwang Gi-dong	The Terminal (터미널) _{[Orig. Yoon Soo-il]}	15 (All Heart)
Idol Department (아이돌부)	24	Han Tae-i	Check you! (검문할게요) _{[Orig. Seung Guk-lee]}	15 (All Heart)

==== Episodes 3 – 5: Team Mission ====
The judging criteria for Season 2 team mission (mentioned at the start of Season 2 Episode 3 team mission) were as follows:

- For groups who had received 14 hearts and below, all the team members will be subjected to elimination from the audition program. Afterwards, all the judges will have a meeting and come down to a decision in which contestant(s) will be able to move on to the next round.
- For groups who had received "All Heart (which is equivalent to 15 hearts)", all team members will automatically be able to advance to the next round of the audition.

Legend:

- **Bold =** Contestants who are able to advance to the next round.
- **<Team Mission>** 1st position box colour code: (Note: For the <Team Mission> and <Death Match> result, there is no 2nd and 3rd place.)
  - – **1st Place: 진(眞)**

After the <Team Mission> ended, a total of 40 contestants were able to advance on to the next round.

Episode 3: Team Mission Part 1
Group Name	Performance order	Contestant name	Genre chosen	Song performed	Number of hearts awarded
Active Duty Department A1 (현역부 A1)	1	**Ahn Sung-hoon**	Rock Trot (락트 트롯)	It's You (너 말이야) _{[Orig. Nam Jin]}	12
Active Duty Department A1 (현역부 A1)	1	**Song Min-joon**	Rock Trot (락트 트롯)	It's You (너 말이야) _{[Orig. Nam Jin]}	12
Active Duty Department A1 (현역부 A1)	1	Roh Ji-hoon	Rock Trot (락트 트롯)	It's You (너 말이야) _{[Orig. Nam Jin]}	12
Active Duty Department A1 (현역부 A1)	1	Son Bin-ah	Rock Trot (락트 트롯)	It's You (너 말이야) _{[Orig. Nam Jin]}	12
University Department (대학부)	2	**Choi Soo-ho**	Semi Trot (세미 트롯)	I Love You Sister (사랑해 누나) _{[Orig. Jang Min-ho]}	14 (All Heart)
University Department (대학부)	2	**Kang Tae-poong**	Semi Trot (세미 트롯)	I Love You Sister (사랑해 누나) _{[Orig. Jang Min-ho]}	14 (All Heart)
University Department (대학부)	2	**Park Ji-hyeon**	Semi Trot (세미 트롯)	I Love You Sister (사랑해 누나) _{[Orig. Jang Min-ho]}	14 (All Heart)
University Department (대학부)	2	**Jang Song-ho**	Semi Trot (세미 트롯)	I Love You Sister (사랑해 누나) _{[Orig. Jang Min-ho]}	14 (All Heart)
University Department (대학부)	2	**Yoon Joon-hyup**	Semi Trot (세미 트롯)	I Love You Sister (사랑해 누나) _{[Orig. Jang Min-ho]}	14 (All Heart)
University Department (대학부)	2	**Lim Chae-pyung**	Semi Trot (세미 트롯)	I Love You Sister (사랑해 누나) _{[Orig. Jang Min-ho]}	14 (All Heart)
University Department (대학부)	2	**Kang Jae-soo**	Semi Trot (세미 트롯)	I Love You Sister (사랑해 누나) _{[Orig. Jang Min-ho]}	14 (All Heart)

Episode 4: Team Mission Part 2
Group Name	Performance order	Contestant name	Genre chosen	Song performed	Number of hearts awarded
Age-agnostic Department (나이야 가라부)	3	Seung Guk-i	Authentic Trot (정통 트롯)	Because I'm Moody (마음이 울적해서) _{[Orig. Sul Woon-do]}	11
Age-agnostic Department (나이야 가라부)	3	Wang Joon	Authentic Trot (정통 트롯)	Because I'm Moody (마음이 울적해서) _{[Orig. Sul Woon-do]}	11
Age-agnostic Department (나이야 가라부)	3	**Go Jung-woo**	Authentic Trot (정통 트롯)	Because I'm Moody (마음이 울적해서) _{[Orig. Sul Woon-do]}	11
National Team Representative Department (국가대표부)	4	Kim Si-won	Semi Trot (세미 트롯)	Make Me Look Ugly (못생기게 만들어주세요) _{[Orig. Yeon Bun-hong]}	12
National Team Representative Department (국가대표부)	4	Kim Hong-jong	Semi Trot (세미 트롯)	Make Me Look Ugly (못생기게 만들어주세요) _{[Orig. Yeon Bun-hong]}	12
National Team Representative Department (국가대표부)	4	Yoon Dae-woong	Semi Trot (세미 트롯)	Make Me Look Ugly (못생기게 만들어주세요) _{[Orig. Yeon Bun-hong]}	12
National Team Representative Department (국가대표부)	4	**Jung Min-chan**	Semi Trot (세미 트롯)	Make Me Look Ugly (못생기게 만들어주세요) _{[Orig. Yeon Bun-hong]}	12
Daddy Department (대디부)	5	Kim Min-jin	7080 Trot (7080 트롯)	You Are The Only One (오직 하나뿐인 그대) _{[Orig. Shim Shin]}	12
Daddy Department (대디부)	5	**Lee Ha-joon**	7080 Trot (7080 트롯)	You Are The Only One (오직 하나뿐인 그대) _{[Orig. Shim Shin]}	12
Daddy Department (대디부)	5	Jin Woong	7080 Trot (7080 트롯)	You Are The Only One (오직 하나뿐인 그대) _{[Orig. Shim Shin]}	12
Daddy Department (대디부)	5	Choi Dae-sung	7080 Trot (7080 트롯)	You Are The Only One (오직 하나뿐인 그대) _{[Orig. Shim Shin]}	12
Boyhood Department (유소년부)	6	Kwon Do-hoon	Authentic Trot (정통 트롯)	Full of Fun (흥부자) _{[Orig. Kim Yang]}	12
Boyhood Department (유소년부)	6	**Park Sung-on**	Authentic Trot (정통 트롯)	Full of Fun (흥부자) _{[Orig. Kim Yang]}	12
Boyhood Department (유소년부)	6	Seo Ji-yoo	Authentic Trot (정통 트롯)	Full of Fun (흥부자) _{[Orig. Kim Yang]}	12
Boyhood Department (유소년부)	6	**Song Do-hyun**	Authentic Trot (정통 트롯)	Full of Fun (흥부자) _{[Orig. Kim Yang]}	12
Boyhood Department (유소년부)	6	Jung Ye-joon	Authentic Trot (정통 트롯)	Full of Fun (흥부자) _{[Orig. Kim Yang]}	12
Winning Department (우승부)	7	**Na Sang-do**	Latin Trot (라틴 트롯)	Oppa is Still Alive (오빠 아직 살아있다) _{[Orig. Nam Jin]}	14 (All Heart)
Winning Department (우승부)	7	**Park Se-wook**	Latin Trot (라틴 트롯)	Oppa is Still Alive (오빠 아직 살아있다) _{[Orig. Nam Jin]}	14 (All Heart)
Winning Department (우승부)	7	**Ahn Sung-joon**	Latin Trot (라틴 트롯)	Oppa is Still Alive (오빠 아직 살아있다) _{[Orig. Nam Jin]}	14 (All Heart)
Winning Department (우승부)	7	**Oh Joo-joo**	Latin Trot (라틴 트롯)	Oppa is Still Alive (오빠 아직 살아있다) _{[Orig. Nam Jin]}	14 (All Heart)
Winning Department (우승부)	7	**Jae Ha**	Latin Trot (라틴 트롯)	Oppa is Still Alive (오빠 아직 살아있다) _{[Orig. Nam Jin]}	14 (All Heart)
Winning Department (우승부)	7	**Jin Hae-sung**	Latin Trot (라틴 트롯)	Oppa is Still Alive (오빠 아직 살아있다) _{[Orig. Nam Jin]}	14 (All Heart)
Tenaciousness Department (독종부)	8	Choi Jeon-seol	Dance Trot (댄스 트롯)	Marc Got It (막가리) _{[Orig. Kim Young-chul]}	11
Tenaciousness Department (독종부)	8	Jung Hyung-chan	Dance Trot (댄스 트롯)	Marc Got It (막가리) _{[Orig. Kim Young-chul]}	11
Tenaciousness Department (독종부)	8	**Lee Chan-sung**	Dance Trot (댄스 트롯)	Marc Got It (막가리) _{[Orig. Kim Young-chul]}	11
Tenaciousness Department (독종부)	8	Won Hyuk	Dance Trot (댄스 트롯)	Marc Got It (막가리) _{[Orig. Kim Young-chul]}	11
Tenaciousness Department (독종부)	8	Yong Ho	Dance Trot (댄스 트롯)	Marc Got It (막가리) _{[Orig. Kim Young-chul]}	11
Tenaciousness Department (독종부)	8	Go Kang-min	Dance Trot (댄스 트롯)	Marc Got It (막가리) _{[Orig. Kim Young-chul]}	11
Careerman Department (직장부)	9	**Kim Yong-pil**	Jazz Trot (재즈 트롯)	Cavaler (카발레) _{[Orig. Ryu Ji-kwang]}	14 (All Heart)
Careerman Department (직장부)	9	**Marcus Kang**	Jazz Trot (재즈 트롯)	Cavaler (카발레) _{[Orig. Ryu Ji-kwang]}	14 (All Heart)
Careerman Department (직장부)	9	**Park Sang-woo**	Jazz Trot (재즈 트롯)	Cavaler (카발레) _{[Orig. Ryu Ji-kwang]}	14 (All Heart)
Careerman Department (직장부)	9	**Lee Sang-yeon**	Jazz Trot (재즈 트롯)	Cavaler (카발레) _{[Orig. Ryu Ji-kwang]}	14 (All Heart)
Different Genre Department (타장르부)	10	The Ray	7080 Trot (7080 트롯)	That Dance in the Rhythm (리듬 속에 그 춤을) _{[Orig. Kim Wan-sun]}	10
Different Genre Department (타장르부)	10	Sung Yoo-bin	7080 Trot (7080 트롯)	That Dance in the Rhythm (리듬 속에 그 춤을) _{[Orig. Kim Wan-sun]}	10
Different Genre Department (타장르부)	10	Sleepy	7080 Trot (7080 트롯)	That Dance in the Rhythm (리듬 속에 그 춤을) _{[Orig. Kim Wan-sun]}	10
Different Genre Department (타장르부)	10	Hwang Gi-dong	7080 Trot (7080 트롯)	That Dance in the Rhythm (리듬 속에 그 춤을) _{[Orig. Kim Wan-sun]}	10
Different Genre Department (타장르부)	10	Hong Seung-min	7080 Trot (7080 트롯)	That Dance in the Rhythm (리듬 속에 그 춤을) _{[Orig. Kim Wan-sun]}	10
Different Genre Department (타장르부)	10	**Gil Byung-min**	7080 Trot (7080 트롯)	That Dance in the Rhythm (리듬 속에 그 춤을) _{[Orig. Kim Wan-sun]}	10
Idol Department (아이돌부)	11	**Park Gon-woo**	Authentic Trot (정통 트롯)	Secret Love (몰래한 사랑) _{[Orig. Kim Ji-ae]}	14 (All Heart)
Idol Department (아이돌부)	11	**Sun Youl**	Authentic Trot (정통 트롯)	Secret Love (몰래한 사랑) _{[Orig. Kim Ji-ae]}	14 (All Heart)
Idol Department (아이돌부)	11	**Sung Ri**	Authentic Trot (정통 트롯)	Secret Love (몰래한 사랑) _{[Orig. Kim Ji-ae]}	14 (All Heart)
Idol Department (아이돌부)	11	**Han Tae-i**	Authentic Trot (정통 트롯)	Secret Love (몰래한 사랑) _{[Orig. Kim Ji-ae]}	14 (All Heart)

Episode 5: Team Mission Part 3
Group Name	Performance order	Contestant name	Genre chosen	Song performed	Number of hearts awarded
Class President Department (반장부)	12	Kim Min-gon	Traditional Korean Trot (국악 트롯)	Resume (이력서) _{[Orig. Nam Jin]}	13
Class President Department (반장부)	12	Seo Gon-hoo	Traditional Korean Trot (국악 트롯)	Resume (이력서) _{[Orig. Nam Jin]}	13
Class President Department (반장부)	12	Jo Seung-won	Traditional Korean Trot (국악 트롯)	Resume (이력서) _{[Orig. Nam Jin]}	13
Class President Department (반장부)	12	**Hwang Min-ho**	Traditional Korean Trot (국악 트롯)	Resume (이력서) _{[Orig. Nam Jin]}	13
Rising Star Department (샛별부)	13	**Young Kwang**	Traditional Korean Trot (국악 트롯)	Love Love (사랑 사랑) _{[Orig. Jung Il-song]}	14 (All Heart)
Rising Star Department (샛별부)	13	**Oh Chan-sung**	Traditional Korean Trot (국악 트롯)	Love Love (사랑 사랑) _{[Orig. Jung Il-song]}	14 (All Heart)
Rising Star Department (샛별부)	13	**Lim Chan**	Traditional Korean Trot (국악 트롯)	Love Love (사랑 사랑) _{[Orig. Jung Il-song]}	14 (All Heart)
Rising Star Department (샛별부)	13	**Jin Wook**	Traditional Korean Trot (국악 트롯)	Love Love (사랑 사랑) _{[Orig. Jung Il-song]}	14 (All Heart)
Rising Star Department (샛별부)	13	**Hwang Min-woo**	Traditional Korean Trot (국악 트롯)	Love Love (사랑 사랑) _{[Orig. Jung Il-song]}	14 (All Heart)
Active Duty Department A2 (현역부 A2)	14	Lee Do-jin	Semi Trot (세미 트롯)	MMM (신사답게) _{[Orig. Young Tak]}	12
Active Duty Department A2 (현역부 A2)	14	Choi Woo-jin	Semi Trot (세미 트롯)	MMM (신사답게) _{[Orig. Young Tak]}	12
Active Duty Department A2 (현역부 A2)	14	**Park Seo-jin**	Semi Trot (세미 트롯)	MMM (신사답게) _{[Orig. Young Tak]}	12
Active Duty Department A2 (현역부 A2)	14	**Kang Dae-woong**	Semi Trot (세미 트롯)	MMM (신사답게) _{[Orig. Young Tak]}	12
Active Duty Department B (현역부 B)	15	**Lee Dae-won**	Dance Trot (댄스 트롯)	Please Arrest My Oppa! (신고할 거야) _{[Orig. Seol Ha-yoon]}	12
Active Duty Department B (현역부 B)	15	Il Min	Dance Trot (댄스 트롯)	Please Arrest My Oppa! (신고할 거야) _{[Orig. Seol Ha-yoon]}	12
Active Duty Department B (현역부 B)	15	Cheon Jae-won	Dance Trot (댄스 트롯)	Please Arrest My Oppa! (신고할 거야) _{[Orig. Seol Ha-yoon]}	12
Active Duty Department B (현역부 B)	15	**Choo Hyuk-jin**	Dance Trot (댄스 트롯)	Please Arrest My Oppa! (신고할 거야) _{[Orig. Seol Ha-yoon]}	12
Active Duty Department B (현역부 B)	15	**Ha Dong-geun**	Dance Trot (댄스 트롯)	Please Arrest My Oppa! (신고할 거야) _{[Orig. Seol Ha-yoon]}	12
Active Duty Department B (현역부 B)	15	Han Yi-jae	Dance Trot (댄스 트롯)	Please Arrest My Oppa! (신고할 거야) _{[Orig. Seol Ha-yoon]}	12

==== Episodes 5 – 7: Death Match (1 VS 1) ====
The judging criteria for Season 2 death match (1 vs 1) were as follows:

- After the pair of contestant had finished their performance, judges will make their decision by choosing which one of the contestant to give their heart to.
- If contestant won the death match, they will automatically move on to the next round.
- If contestant lost during the death match, they will be subjected to elimination.

Legend:

- **Bold** = Contestant able to move on to the next round.
- Box colour:
  - – Contestant won.
    – Contestant lost.
    – **Contestant on top of winning the Death Match, also achieved 1st Place: 진(眞)**

After the <Death Match (1 VS 1)> had ended, a total of 25 contestants were able to advance on to the next round.

Episode 5: 1 VS 1 Match Part 1
Performance order	Name of contestants			Song performed		Number of hearts received	
1	**Ha Dong-geun**	VS	**Kim Yong-pil** (Note: <Death Match (1 VS 1)> TOP 5)	Why Did You Turn Around (왜 돌아보오) _{[Orig. Yoon Bok-hee]}	You (당신) _{[Orig. Kim Jung-soo]}	0	15
2	**Yoon Joon-hyup**	VS	Sung Min	You & Me (사랑의 해결사) _{[Orig. Kim Soo-chan]}	Heartless (무정) _{[Orig. Lee Ho-seop]}	10	5
3	Jae Ha	VS	**Jin Hae-sung**	My Love (사랑아) _{[Orig. Kang Seung-mo]}	Hymn of Wish (비나리) _{[Orig. Sim Soo-bong]}	4	11

Episode 6: 1 VS 1 Match Part 2
Performance order	Name of contestants			Song performed		Number of hearts received	
4	Lee Chan-sung	VS	**Lee Ha-joon**	Cheers (건배) _{[Orig. Na Huna]}	It's Me (나야 나) _{[Orig. Nam Jin]}	0	15
5	Young Kwang	VS	**Kang Jae-soo**	That Girl's Mascara (그 여자의 마스카라) _{[Orig. Im Hyun-jung]}	I Buried You Next to the Cornfield (옥수수밭 옆에 당신을 묻고) _{[Orig. Jung Eui-song]}	5	10
6	**Park Sung-on**	VS	**Song Do-hyun**	You Know My Name (내 이름 아시죠) _{[Orig. Jang Min-ho]}	Dead Widow (망부석) _{[Orig. Kim Tae-gon]}	5	10
7	**Jang Song-ho**	VS	Hwang Min-woo	Longing (사모) _{[Orig. Na Huna]}	Honey Honey (하니하니) _{[Orig. Seo Ji-oh]}	10	5
8	**Choi Soo-ho**	VS	**Chu Hyuk-jin**	Promise Under the Moon (월하가약) _{[Orig. Song Ga-in]}	Lady Jin Ahn (진안아가씨) _{[Orig. Jin Sung]}	13	2
9	**Jin Wook**	VS	**Park Ji-hyeon**	Time Doesn't Wait (무심세월) _{[Orig. Na Huna]}	You Can't Leave (떠날 수 없는 당신) _{[Orig. Kim Sang-bae]}	7	8
10	**Na Sang-do**	VS	Kang Tae-poong	Ugly love (미운 사랑) _{[Orig. Jin Mi-ryeong]}	Pretty Boy Hong Chun (꽃미남 홍춘이) _{[Orig. Hong Chun]}	13	2

Episode 7: 1 VS 1 Match Part 2
Performance order	Name of contestants			Song performed		Number of hearts received	
11	**Lim Chan**	VS	**Oh Chan-sung**	Net (그물) _{[Orig. Son Bin]}	Foolish Man (바보같은 사나이) _{[Orig. Na Huna]}	6	9
12	Jung Min-chan	VS	**Marcus Kang**	Bang Bang (빵빵) _{[Orig. Park Sang-chul]}	Empty Glass (빈잔) _{[Orig. Nam Jin]}	4	11
13	Lee Dae-won	VS	**Go Jung-woo**	Rainwater (빗물) _{[Orig. Chae Eun-ok]}	No No (안돼요 안돼) _{[Orig. Kim Sang-bae]}	3	12
14	**Hwang Min-ho**	VS	Park Gon-woo	Thousand Year Stone (천년바위) _{[Orig. Park Jung-sik]}	Right Answer (정답은 없다) _{[Orig. Jang Min-ho]}	15	0
15	**Song Min-joon**	VS	Ahn Sung-joon	Surely (정녕) _{[Orig. Jo Hang-jo]}	I Don't Know (몰라) _{[Orig. Na Huna]}	13	2
16	**Ahn Sung-hoon**	VS	Park Seo-jin	Irrevocable Years (돌릴 수 없는 세월) _{[Orig. Jo Hang-jo]}	Baby, You Are Leaving Me (떠나는 임아) _{[Orig. Oh Seung-geun]}	13	2
17	**Sung Ri**	VS	Kang Dae-woong	It's Raining on the Man's Heart (사나이 가슴에 비가 내리네) _{[Orig. Kim Sang-bae]}	Heartbreaking (가슴 아프게) _{[Orig. Nam Jin]}	9	6
18	Park Se-wook	VS	**Gil Byung-min**	The Last Leaf (마지막 잎새) _{[Orig. Bae Ho]}	White Space (여백) _{[Orig. Jeong Dong-won]}	7	8
19	Oh Joo-joo	VS	**Han Tae-i**	Shichimi (시치미) _{[Orig. N/A]} (Note: The original singer was not shown during the show.)	Bench (벤치) _{[Orig. N/A]}	2	13
20	**Sun Youl**	VS	Lim Chae-pyung	Your Lantern (님의 등불) _{[Orig. Jin Sung]}	A Milestone (이정표) _{[Orig. Jang Yoon-jeong]}	14	1

==== Episodes 8 – 9: Medley Team Mission ====
In this mission, top 5 contestant from the last round will be able to recruit their own members to form their team.

Also, on top of the 13 masters, this time round, 300 audiences would also be given a chance to vote.

Only the members of the group that won the 1st place, will be able to automatically be able to move on to the next round. Rest of the contestants they will be subjected to elimination

===== Round 1: Medley Team Mission =====
The scoring for Round 1: Medley Team Mission was as follows:

- Maximum master score is 1300 points, with each master team able to give up to 100 points to each group.
- Maximum audience score is 300 points.
- Hence, the total score a team able to achieve would be 1600 points.
- The group which was able to clinched the 1st place on the 1st round will be able to get an extra 30 points.

Episode 8: Round 1: Medley Team Mission
Group name	Performance order	Contestant name	Songs performed	Score awarded			Ranking (Round 1)
Group name	Performance order	Contestant name	Songs performed	Master	Audience	Total (Round 1)	Ranking (Round 1)
Mr Bbong Shine (미스터 뽕샤인)	1	Kim Yong-pil _{(Team Leader)}	Gangster (야인) _{[Orig. Kang Sung]}; New Sad Hill (신 사랑고개) _{[Orig. Kum Jan-di]}; Destiny (인연) _{[Orig. Ha Dong-jin]}; Nuna is Perfect (누나가 딱이야) _{[Orig. Young Tak]}; Like Adam and Eve (아담과 이브처럼) _{[Orig. Na Huna]}; Wanna Get Some Abalone (전복 먹으러 갈래) _{[Orig. Young Tak]}; Fate (인연) _{[Orig. Lee Sun-hee]}	1096	258	1354	4
Mr Bbong Shine (미스터 뽕샤인)	1	Hwang Min-ho	Gangster (야인) _{[Orig. Kang Sung]}; New Sad Hill (신 사랑고개) _{[Orig. Kum Jan-di]}; Destiny (인연) _{[Orig. Ha Dong-jin]}; Nuna is Perfect (누나가 딱이야) _{[Orig. Young Tak]}; Like Adam and Eve (아담과 이브처럼) _{[Orig. Na Huna]}; Wanna Get Some Abalone (전복 먹으러 갈래) _{[Orig. Young Tak]}; Fate (인연) _{[Orig. Lee Sun-hee]}	1096	258	1354	4
Mr Bbong Shine (미스터 뽕샤인)	1	Jin Hae-sung	Gangster (야인) _{[Orig. Kang Sung]}; New Sad Hill (신 사랑고개) _{[Orig. Kum Jan-di]}; Destiny (인연) _{[Orig. Ha Dong-jin]}; Nuna is Perfect (누나가 딱이야) _{[Orig. Young Tak]}; Like Adam and Eve (아담과 이브처럼) _{[Orig. Na Huna]}; Wanna Get Some Abalone (전복 먹으러 갈래) _{[Orig. Young Tak]}; Fate (인연) _{[Orig. Lee Sun-hee]}	1096	258	1354	4
Mr Bbong Shine (미스터 뽕샤인)	1	Lee Ha-joon	Gangster (야인) _{[Orig. Kang Sung]}; New Sad Hill (신 사랑고개) _{[Orig. Kum Jan-di]}; Destiny (인연) _{[Orig. Ha Dong-jin]}; Nuna is Perfect (누나가 딱이야) _{[Orig. Young Tak]}; Like Adam and Eve (아담과 이브처럼) _{[Orig. Na Huna]}; Wanna Get Some Abalone (전복 먹으러 갈래) _{[Orig. Young Tak]}; Fate (인연) _{[Orig. Lee Sun-hee]}	1096	258	1354	4
Mr Bbong Shine (미스터 뽕샤인)	1	Go Jung-woo	Gangster (야인) _{[Orig. Kang Sung]}; New Sad Hill (신 사랑고개) _{[Orig. Kum Jan-di]}; Destiny (인연) _{[Orig. Ha Dong-jin]}; Nuna is Perfect (누나가 딱이야) _{[Orig. Young Tak]}; Like Adam and Eve (아담과 이브처럼) _{[Orig. Na Huna]}; Wanna Get Some Abalone (전복 먹으러 갈래) _{[Orig. Young Tak]}; Fate (인연) _{[Orig. Lee Sun-hee]}	1096	258	1354	4
The Honeybees (꿀벌즈)	2	Park Ji-hyeon _{(Team Leader)}	Honey (하니) _{[Orig. KARA]}; I Love You (당신이 좋아) _{[Orig. Nam Jin]}; Breeze of flowers Lady (꽃바람 여인) _{[Orig. Jo Seung-gu]}; Myung Ja (명자) _{[Orig. Na Huna]}; An Odious Man (미운 사내) _{[Orig. Yoo Ji-na]}; On a Saturday Night (토요일 밤에) _{[Orig. Kim Hye-yeon]}; Love Twist (사랑의 트위스트) _{[Orig. Sul Woon-do}	1214	267	1481	3
The Honeybees (꿀벌즈)	2	Kang Jae-soo	Honey (하니) _{[Orig. KARA]}; I Love You (당신이 좋아) _{[Orig. Nam Jin]}; Breeze of flowers Lady (꽃바람 여인) _{[Orig. Jo Seung-gu]}; Myung Ja (명자) _{[Orig. Na Huna]}; An Odious Man (미운 사내) _{[Orig. Yoo Ji-na]}; On a Saturday Night (토요일 밤에) _{[Orig. Kim Hye-yeon]}; Love Twist (사랑의 트위스트) _{[Orig. Sul Woon-do}	1214	267	1481	3
The Honeybees (꿀벌즈)	2	Song Do-hyun	Honey (하니) _{[Orig. KARA]}; I Love You (당신이 좋아) _{[Orig. Nam Jin]}; Breeze of flowers Lady (꽃바람 여인) _{[Orig. Jo Seung-gu]}; Myung Ja (명자) _{[Orig. Na Huna]}; An Odious Man (미운 사내) _{[Orig. Yoo Ji-na]}; On a Saturday Night (토요일 밤에) _{[Orig. Kim Hye-yeon]}; Love Twist (사랑의 트위스트) _{[Orig. Sul Woon-do}	1214	267	1481	3
The Honeybees (꿀벌즈)	2	Sung Ri	Honey (하니) _{[Orig. KARA]}; I Love You (당신이 좋아) _{[Orig. Nam Jin]}; Breeze of flowers Lady (꽃바람 여인) _{[Orig. Jo Seung-gu]}; Myung Ja (명자) _{[Orig. Na Huna]}; An Odious Man (미운 사내) _{[Orig. Yoo Ji-na]}; On a Saturday Night (토요일 밤에) _{[Orig. Kim Hye-yeon]}; Love Twist (사랑의 트위스트) _{[Orig. Sul Woon-do}	1214	267	1481	3
The Honeybees (꿀벌즈)	2	Jang Song-ho	Honey (하니) _{[Orig. KARA]}; I Love You (당신이 좋아) _{[Orig. Nam Jin]}; Breeze of flowers Lady (꽃바람 여인) _{[Orig. Jo Seung-gu]}; Myung Ja (명자) _{[Orig. Na Huna]}; An Odious Man (미운 사내) _{[Orig. Yoo Ji-na]}; On a Saturday Night (토요일 밤에) _{[Orig. Kim Hye-yeon]}; Love Twist (사랑의 트위스트) _{[Orig. Sul Woon-do}	1214	267	1481	3
Bbong Flix (뽕플릭스)	3	Song Min-joon (Team Leader)	Get Up (벌떡 일어나) _{[Orig. Na Sang-do]}; I Love You _{[Orig. Hyun Chul]}; My Only Lady (나만의 여인) _{[Orig. Sul Woon-do]}; Sad Fate (슬픈 인연) _{[Orig. Na Mi]}; I Feel Good _{[Orig. James Brown]}; By Chance (우연히) _{[Orig. Woo Yeon-yi]}; Live High From Now (폼나게 살 거야) _{[Orig. Bae Il-ho]}	1101	210	1311	5
Bbong Flix (뽕플릭스)	3	Sun Youl	Get Up (벌떡 일어나) _{[Orig. Na Sang-do]}; I Love You _{[Orig. Hyun Chul]}; My Only Lady (나만의 여인) _{[Orig. Sul Woon-do]}; Sad Fate (슬픈 인연) _{[Orig. Na Mi]}; I Feel Good _{[Orig. James Brown]}; By Chance (우연히) _{[Orig. Woo Yeon-yi]}; Live High From Now (폼나게 살 거야) _{[Orig. Bae Il-ho]}	1101	210	1311	5
Bbong Flix (뽕플릭스)	3	Marcus Kang	Get Up (벌떡 일어나) _{[Orig. Na Sang-do]}; I Love You _{[Orig. Hyun Chul]}; My Only Lady (나만의 여인) _{[Orig. Sul Woon-do]}; Sad Fate (슬픈 인연) _{[Orig. Na Mi]}; I Feel Good _{[Orig. James Brown]}; By Chance (우연히) _{[Orig. Woo Yeon-yi]}; Live High From Now (폼나게 살 거야) _{[Orig. Bae Il-ho]}	1101	210	1311	5
Bbong Flix (뽕플릭스)	3	Ha Dong-geun	Get Up (벌떡 일어나) _{[Orig. Na Sang-do]}; I Love You _{[Orig. Hyun Chul]}; My Only Lady (나만의 여인) _{[Orig. Sul Woon-do]}; Sad Fate (슬픈 인연) _{[Orig. Na Mi]}; I Feel Good _{[Orig. James Brown]}; By Chance (우연히) _{[Orig. Woo Yeon-yi]}; Live High From Now (폼나게 살 거야) _{[Orig. Bae Il-ho]}	1101	210	1311	5
Bbong Flix (뽕플릭스)	3	Oh Chan-sung	Get Up (벌떡 일어나) _{[Orig. Na Sang-do]}; I Love You _{[Orig. Hyun Chul]}; My Only Lady (나만의 여인) _{[Orig. Sul Woon-do]}; Sad Fate (슬픈 인연) _{[Orig. Na Mi]}; I Feel Good _{[Orig. James Brown]}; By Chance (우연히) _{[Orig. Woo Yeon-yi]}; Live High From Now (폼나게 살 거야) _{[Orig. Bae Il-ho]}	1101	210	1311	5
Bbong Dream (뽕드림)	4	Ahn Sung-hoon (Team Leader)	Night Train (밤열차) _{[Orig. Kim Yeon-ja]}; A Younger Man (연하의 남자) _{[Orig. Kang Jin]}; Invitation (초대) _{[Orig. Uhm Jung-hwa]}; Oh My (얼쑤) _{[Orig. Wink]}; Yellow Mast (황포돛대) _{[Orig. Lee Mi-ja]}; Mona Lisa (모나리자) _{[Orig. Cho Yong-pil]}; What's There to Life (인생 뭐 있나) _{[Orig. Lee Byung-chul]}	1251	276	1557 (Note: Raw score is 1527.)	1
Bbong Dream (뽕드림)	4	Han Tae-i	Night Train (밤열차) _{[Orig. Kim Yeon-ja]}; A Younger Man (연하의 남자) _{[Orig. Kang Jin]}; Invitation (초대) _{[Orig. Uhm Jung-hwa]}; Oh My (얼쑤) _{[Orig. Wink]}; Yellow Mast (황포돛대) _{[Orig. Lee Mi-ja]}; Mona Lisa (모나리자) _{[Orig. Cho Yong-pil]}; What's There to Life (인생 뭐 있나) _{[Orig. Lee Byung-chul]}	1251	276	1557	1
Bbong Dream (뽕드림)	4	Lim Chan	Night Train (밤열차) _{[Orig. Kim Yeon-ja]}; A Younger Man (연하의 남자) _{[Orig. Kang Jin]}; Invitation (초대) _{[Orig. Uhm Jung-hwa]}; Oh My (얼쑤) _{[Orig. Wink]}; Yellow Mast (황포돛대) _{[Orig. Lee Mi-ja]}; Mona Lisa (모나리자) _{[Orig. Cho Yong-pil]}; What's There to Life (인생 뭐 있나) _{[Orig. Lee Byung-chul]}	1251	276	1557	1
Bbong Dream (뽕드림)	4	Na Sang-do	Night Train (밤열차) _{[Orig. Kim Yeon-ja]}; A Younger Man (연하의 남자) _{[Orig. Kang Jin]}; Invitation (초대) _{[Orig. Uhm Jung-hwa]}; Oh My (얼쑤) _{[Orig. Wink]}; Yellow Mast (황포돛대) _{[Orig. Lee Mi-ja]}; Mona Lisa (모나리자) _{[Orig. Cho Yong-pil]}; What's There to Life (인생 뭐 있나) _{[Orig. Lee Byung-chul]}	1251	276	1557	1
Bbong Dream (뽕드림)	4	Park Sung-on	Night Train (밤열차) _{[Orig. Kim Yeon-ja]}; A Younger Man (연하의 남자) _{[Orig. Kang Jin]}; Invitation (초대) _{[Orig. Uhm Jung-hwa]}; Oh My (얼쑤) _{[Orig. Wink]}; Yellow Mast (황포돛대) _{[Orig. Lee Mi-ja]}; Mona Lisa (모나리자) _{[Orig. Cho Yong-pil]}; What's There to Life (인생 뭐 있나) _{[Orig. Lee Byung-chul]}	1251	276	1557	1

Episode 9: Round 1: Medley Team Mission
Group name	Performance order	Contestant name	Songs performed	Score awarded			Ranking (Round 1)
Group name	Performance order	Contestant name	Songs performed	Master	Audience	Total (Round 1)	Ranking (Round 1)
Jin Gi Si Kan (진기스칸)	5	Choi Soo-ho (Team Leader)	Ssang Ssang (쌍쌍) _{[Orig. Na Sang-do]}; Face that I Miss (보고싶은 얼굴) _{[Orig. Min Hae-kyung]}; What Love (무슨 사랑) _{[Orig. Yoo Ji-na]}; Sending My Love (송인) _{[Orig. Jang Yoon-jeong]}; Spark (불티) _{[Orig. Jeon Young-rok]}; Come to Oppa's House (오빠 집에 놀러와) _{[Orig. Lee Dae-won]}	1264	254	1518	2
Jin Gi Si Kan (진기스칸)	5	Jin Wook	Ssang Ssang (쌍쌍) _{[Orig. Na Sang-do]}; Face that I Miss (보고싶은 얼굴) _{[Orig. Min Hae-kyung]}; What Love (무슨 사랑) _{[Orig. Yoo Ji-na]}; Sending My Love (송인) _{[Orig. Jang Yoon-jeong]}; Spark (불티) _{[Orig. Jeon Young-rok]}; Come to Oppa's House (오빠 집에 놀러와) _{[Orig. Lee Dae-won]}	1264	254	1518	2
Jin Gi Si Kan (진기스칸)	5	Gil Byung-min	Ssang Ssang (쌍쌍) _{[Orig. Na Sang-do]}; Face that I Miss (보고싶은 얼굴) _{[Orig. Min Hae-kyung]}; What Love (무슨 사랑) _{[Orig. Yoo Ji-na]}; Sending My Love (송인) _{[Orig. Jang Yoon-jeong]}; Spark (불티) _{[Orig. Jeon Young-rok]}; Come to Oppa's House (오빠 집에 놀러와) _{[Orig. Lee Dae-won]}	1264	254	1518	2
Jin Gi Si Kan (진기스칸)	5	Yoon Joon-hyup	Ssang Ssang (쌍쌍) _{[Orig. Na Sang-do]}; Face that I Miss (보고싶은 얼굴) _{[Orig. Min Hae-kyung]}; What Love (무슨 사랑) _{[Orig. Yoo Ji-na]}; Sending My Love (송인) _{[Orig. Jang Yoon-jeong]}; Spark (불티) _{[Orig. Jeon Young-rok]}; Come to Oppa's House (오빠 집에 놀러와) _{[Orig. Lee Dae-won]}	1264	254	1518	2
Jin Gi Si Kan (진기스칸)	5	Chu Hyuk-jin	Ssang Ssang (쌍쌍) _{[Orig. Na Sang-do]}; Face that I Miss (보고싶은 얼굴) _{[Orig. Min Hae-kyung]}; What Love (무슨 사랑) _{[Orig. Yoo Ji-na]}; Sending My Love (송인) _{[Orig. Jang Yoon-jeong]}; Spark (불티) _{[Orig. Jeon Young-rok]}; Come to Oppa's House (오빠 집에 놀러와) _{[Orig. Lee Dae-won]}	1264	254	1518	2

===== Round 2: Team Leader Battle =====
Similarly in the 2nd round, the scoring was as follows:

- Maximum master score is 1300 points, with each master team able to give up to 100 points to each group.
- Maximum audience score is 300 points.
- Hence, the total score a team able to achieve would be 1600 points.

Episode 9: Round 2: Solo Performance
Group name	Performance order	Contestant name	Song performed	Score awarded			Final Rank
Group name	Performance order	Contestant name	Song performed	Master	Audience	Final (Round 1 + Round 2)	Final Rank
Bbong Flix (뽕플릭스)	1	Song Min-joon	End of the Sea (바다 끝) _{[Orig. Choi Baek-ho]}	1156	234	2701	5
Mr Bbong Shine (미스터 뽕샤인)	2	Kim Yong-pil	Passionate Love (열애) _{[Orig. Yoon Si-nae]}	1229	264	2847	4
The Honeybees (꿀벌즈)	3	Park Ji-hyeon	Daejeon Blues (대전 부르스)	1161	223	2865	3
Jin Gi Si Kan (진기스칸)	4	Choi Soo-ho	Never (영영)	1259	254	3031	1
Bbong Dream (뽕드림)	5	Ahn Sung-hoon	Woman's Life (여자의 일생)	1111	243	2911	2

=== Season 3 ===
==== Episodes 1 – 3: Introduction and Master Preliminary Audition ====
Each contestant performs in front of a panel of 19 judges. Each judge may award the contestant a "heart", signified by lighting up a heart-shaped display next to their chair.

Bold = Contestants who are able to advance to the next round.

Episode 1: Audition Performances
Group	Performance order	Contestant name	Song performed	Number of hearts awarded

== Soundtrack ==
Season 1 original soundtracks

Mr Trot

Compilation album by Various artists
- Released: Best of Mr Trot Preliminary Match; January 17, 2020; Best of Mr Trot Team Match; January 24, 2020; Mr Trot Death Match Part 1; January 30, 2020; Mr Trot Death Match Part 2; February 7, 2020; Mr Trot Aid Best; February 21, 2020; Mr Trot Legend Mission Best; March 6, 2020; Mr Trot Final Best; March 13, 2020
- Length: 60:13 (Best of Mr Trot Preliminary Match); 34:12 (Best of Mr Trot Team Match); 7:16 (Mr Trot Death Match Part 1); 01:24:-- (Mr Trot Death Match Part 2); 35:-- Mr Trot Aid Best
- Language: Korean
- Labels: TV Chosun; Show Play; Kakao M

Season 2 original soundtracks

Mr Trot 2

Compilation album by Various artists
- Released: Best of Mr Trot Preliminary Match Part 1; December 23, 2022; Best of Mr Trot Preliminary Match Part 2; December 30, 2022; Best of Mr Trot Preliminary Match Part 3; January 06, 2023; Mr Trot Team Mission Part 1; January 13, 2023; Best of Mr Trot Team Mission Part 2 & Death Match Part 1; January 20, 2023; Best of Mr Trot 1:1 Death Match Part 2; January 27, 2023; Best of Mr Trot 1:1 Death Match Part 3; February 03, 2023; Best of Mr Trot Medley Team Mission Part 1; February 10, 2023; Best of Mr Trot Medley Team Mission Part 2; February 17, 2023; Best of Mr Trot Rival Match Part 1; February 24, 2023
- Length: 42:39 (Best of Mr Trot Preliminary Match Part 1); 53:39 (Best of Mr Trot Preliminary Match Part 2); 30:22 (Best of Mr Trot Preliminary Match Part 3); 59:04 (Best of Mr Trot Team Mission Part 1); 60:01 (Best of Mr Trot Team Mission Part 2 & Death Match Part 1); 60:03 (Best of Mr Trot 1:1 Death Match Part 2); 60:15 (Best of Mr Trot 1:1 Death Match Part 3); 60:21 (Best of Mr Trot Medley Team Mission Part 1); 60:01 (Best of Mr Trot Medley Team Mission Part 2); 60:52 (Best of Rival Match Part 1)
- Language: Korean
- Labels: TV Chosun; Kakao Entertainment

== Ratings ==
=== Season 1 ===
Season 1
Mr. Trot Season 1 : South Korea viewers per episode (millions)

Season	Episode number											Average
Season	1	2	3	4	5	6	7	8	9	10	11	Average
S1	2.567	3.774	3.607	4.217	5.460	5.917	6.203	6.464	6.999	7.537	7.955	5.518

Source: Audience measurement performed nationwide by Nielsen Korea.

Average TV viewership ratings
Ep.	Original broadcast date	Average audience share (Nielsen Korea)			
Ep.	Original broadcast date	Nationwide		Seoul	
Ep.	Original broadcast date	Part 1	Part 2	Part 1	Part 2
1	January 2, 2020	8.165%	12.524%	8.309%	12.717%
2	January 9, 2020	13.727%	17.879%	13.449%	17.188%
3	January 16, 2020	15.636%	17.736%	14.577%	17.472%
4	January 23, 2020	16.050%	19.372%	14.886%	17.842%
5	January 30, 2020	20.815%	25.709%	19.309%	24.331%
6	February 6, 2020	23.150%	27.463%	21.741%	25.783%
7	February 13, 2020	24.155%	28.064%	22.429%	26.245%
8	February 20, 2020	26.591%	30.407%	23.967%	28.577%
9	February 27, 2020	28.056%	32.699%	25.332%	29.521%
10	March 5, 2020	29.138%	33.836%	27.452%	31.845%
11	March 12, 2020	34.016%	35.711%	32.263%	34.713%
Average		21.773%	25.582%	20.338%	24.203%
Special
12	March 14, 2020	28.672%		26.049%	
In the table above, the blue numbers represent the lowest ratings and the red numbers represent the highest ratings.; Ratings do not include commercial time, which regular ratings usually do.

=== Season 2 ===
Season 2
Mr. Trot Season 2 : South Korea viewers per episode (millions)

Season	Episode number										Average
Season	1	2	3	4	5	6	7	8	9	10	Average
S2	4.249	4.602	4.521	4.414	4.604	4.717	4.693	3.908	4.309	4.639	4.466

Source: Audience measurement performed nationwide by Nielsen Korea.

Average TV viewership ratings
Ep.	Original broadcast date	Average audience share (Nielsen Korea)					
Ep.	Original broadcast date	Nationwide			Seoul		
Ep.	Original broadcast date	Part 1	Part 2	Part 3	Part 1	Part 2	Part 3
1	December 22, 2022	18.680%	20.203%	—N/a	15.476%	17.459%	—N/a
2	December 29, 2022	18.065%	20.798%	—N/a	15.965%	18.100%	—N/a
3	January 5, 2023	19.532%	20.895%	—N/a	17.260%	18.813%	—N/a
4	January 12, 2023	19.657%	20.863%	17.947%	16.916%	18.162%	16.005%
5	January 19, 2023	19.813%	21.289%	17.970%	16.612%	18.192%	15.052%
6	January 26, 2023	19.482%	21.772%	19.330%	15.195%	17.363%	16.257%
7	February 2, 2023	19.952%	21.840%	18.442%	17.062%	18.681%	16.020%
8	February 9, 2023	18.831%	17.890%	—N/a	15.069%	14.206%	—N/a
9	February 16, 2023	16.703%	20.541%	18.744%	13.990%	17.460%	15.998%
10	February 23, 2023	17.343%	21.869%	18.548%	14.984%	18.984%	15.821%
Average							
Special
1	January 10, 2023	5.817%	4.919%	—N/a	4.884%	4.155%	—N/a
In the table above, the blue numbers represent the lowest ratings and the red numbers represent the highest ratings.; Ratings do not include commercial time, which regular ratings usually do.

=== Season 3 ===
Season 3
Mr. Trot Season 3 : South Korea viewers per episode (millions)

Season	Episode number					Average
Season	1	2	3	4	5	Average
S3	2.547	2.898	2.962	2.586	2.892	2.912

Source: Audience measurement performed nationwide by Nielsen Korea.

Average TV viewership ratings
Ep.	Original broadcast date	Average audience share (Nielsen Korea)					
Ep.	Original broadcast date	Nationwide			Seoul		
Ep.	Original broadcast date	Part 1	Part 2	Part 3	Part 1	Part 2	Part 3
1	December 19, 2024	9.128%	12.852%	12.052%	8.218%	10.602%	10.450%
2	December 26, 2024	13.733%	15.056%	13.426%	11.515%	12.860%	11.225%
3	January 9, 2025	13.602%	13.506%	12.317%	11.515%	11.531%	10.224%
4	January 16, 2025	10.946%	11.878%	9.897%	9.882%	11.061%	8.555%
5	January 23, 2025	12.307%	13.341%	11.400%	10.946%	11.386%	9.907%
6	January 30, 2025	9.734%	13.148%	12.348%	8.839%	11.582%	11.787%
7	February 6, 2025						
8	February 13, 2025						
9	February 20, 2025						
10	February 27, 2025						
11	March 6, 2025						
12	March 13, 2025						
Average							
Special
1	January 14, 2023	—N/a	2.680%	—N/a	—N/a	—N/a	—N/a
2	January 21, 2023	—N/a	2.642%	—N/a	—N/a	—N/a	—N/a
In the table above, the blue numbers represent the lowest ratings and the red numbers represent the highest ratings.; Ratings do not include commercial time, which regular ratings usually do.
