= 34th Seoul Music Awards =

2025 South Korean music award ceremony

- Date: June 21, 2025
- Venue: Inspire Arena
- Country: South Korea
- Hosted by: Kang Seung-yoon; Miyeon; Soobin

Highlights
- Most wins: Young Tak (4)
- Website: seoulmusicawards.com

Television/radio coverage
- Network: BIGC

The 34th Seoul Music Awards (Korean: 34th 서울가요대상; RR: 34th Seoul Gayo Daesang) is an award ceremony held on June 21, 2025, in Inspire Arena, South Korea. Organized by Y Global Music and Sports Seoul. The show is hosted by Kang Seung-yoon, Miyeon, and Soobin.

== Criteria ==
Only songs and albums released from January 2024 to March 2025 were eligible to be nominated.

Category	Online voting	Panelist	Music sales (Album/ Digital sales)
Main Prize (Bonsang)	30%	40%	30%
Rookie Award	30%	40%	30%
Genre Awards	30%	40%	30%
Popularity Awards	100%	—N/a	
Special Awards	—N/a	100%	—N/a

== Performers ==
The first list of performers was announced on May 16. The second list of performers was announced on May 21. The third list of performers was announced on May 26.

List of performances
Artist(s)	Song(s) performed
Doyoung	"Little Light" "Flying Duck" "Memory"
Say My Name	"ShaLaLa"
VVUP	"4 Life" "Giddy Boy"
QWER	"Dear" "T.B.H"
Fifty Fifty	"SOS" "Pookie"
KiiiKiii	"I Do Me"
Hwang Karam	"If the World Turns Against You" "I'm Firefly"
Wave to Earth	"Annie."
Hearts2Hearts	"The Chase"
KickFlip	"Mama Said" "Freeze"
Chanelle Moon Hana	"Y (Please Tell Me Why)"
Hitomi Honda Kanny Dohee	"My Lips... Warm Like Coffee"
Allen Wonjin Taeyoung	"Officially Missing You"
Cravity	"Love or Die" "Now or Never"
Illit	"Magnetic" "Do the Dance"
NCT Wish	"Wish" "Steady"
P1Harmony	"Duh!" "Sad Song"
Seo Eun-kwang Donghyeon Minnie	"Reflection of You in Your Smile" (Seo only) "Sad Fate" (Donghyeon only) "Violet Fragrance" (Minnie only) "To Lady" (with Byun Jin-sub)
Young Tak	"Unpredictable Life" "SuperSuper"
Zerobaseone	"Devil Game" "Blue"
BtoB	"Love Today" "Missing You"
Tomorrow X Together	"Deja Vu" "Danger" "Love Language"
I-dle	"Good Thing" "Fate"

== Presenters ==
The first list of presenters was announced on May 6. The second list of presenters was announced on May 30.

- Jang Gyu-ri and Ong Seong-wu – presented Rising Star Award, Discovery of the Year, and Rookie of the Year
- Kang You-seok and Shin Si-ah – presented Main Prize (Bonsang)
- Chang Ryul and Park Ju-hyun – presented Best Performance Award, Band Award, Ballad Award, R&B/ Hip-hop Award, OST Award, and Trot Award
- Soobin – presented Popularity Award and K-Wave Special Award
- Kim Sung-cheol and Nam Gyu-ri – presented Best Group, Best Solo Award, and K-pop Special Award
- Kang Seung-yoon – presented K-pop World Choice – Group and K-pop World Choice – Solo
- Jung Eun-chae – presented World Best Artist, Best Album Award, and Best Song Award
- Byeon Woo-seok – presented Grand Prize (Daesang)

== Winners and nominees ==
Winners and nominees were listed in alphabetical order. Winners were listed first and emphasized in bold.

The list of nominees was announced on March 24, 2025, through the official website. Voting opened on March 24, 2025, and closed on May 10, 2025.

=== Main awards ===
Grand Prize (Daesang)
**I-dle**
Main Prize (Bonsang)	Rookie of the Year
**Aespa**; **Doyoung**; **Enhypen**; **G-Dragon**; **I-dle**; **Illit**; **Ive**; **NCT Dream**; **NCT Wish**; **P1Harmony**; **Plave**; **QWER**; **Rosé**; **Seventeen**; **Stray Kids**; **Tomorrow X Together**; **Young Tak**; **Zerobaseone**; List of nominated artists: Ateez; Babymonster; Baekhyun; Bibi; BoyNextDoor; BSS; BtoB; BTS; Crush; D.O.; Day6; Eclipse; Fifty Fifty; Got7; Hwang Karam; Itzy; IU; Izna; JD1; Jennie; Jimin; Jin; Jisoo; Jungkook; JxW; Kang Daniel; Kep1er; Kiss of Life; Le Sserafim; Lee Chang-sub; Lee Chan-won; Lee Mu-jin; Lee Young-ji; Lim Young-woong; Meovv; Minnie; Nayeon; NCT 127; NewJeans; Nmixx; One Pact; Park Ji-hyeon; Riize; RM; Taeyeon; The Boyz; Treasure; TripleS; Twice; TWS; Unis; Wendy; Xikers; Yuqi; Zico	**Hearts2Hearts**; **KickFlip**; **KiiiKiii**; 3Piece; ARrC; Blingone; Dignity; Izna; Loveone; Madein; Meovv; Newbeat; Nouera; Odd Youth; Say My Name
Best Song Award	Best Album Award
**Tomorrow X Together – "Deja Vu"**	**Tomorrow X Together – Minisode 3: Tomorrow**; **Zerobaseone – Blue Paradise**
Ballad Award	R&B/ Hip-hop Award
**Hwang Karam**; 10cm; Bibi; Crush; Heize; Huh Gak, Kim Hee-jae, Lee Jin-sung, Lee Mu-jin, Onestar & #Annyeong; Hwagok-dong Green Frog; IU; Jennie; Kiss of Life; Lee Chang-sub; Lee Mu-jin; Lim Young-woong; Plave; Rosé; Roy Kim; Seventeen; Yoo Hwe-seung	**RM**; B.I; Be'O; Bibi; Bobby; Daniel Jikal; G-Dragon; Heize; Hoony; I.M; Jay Park; J-Hope; Lee Hi; Lee Young-ji; Zico
OST Award	Trot Award
**Young Tak – "Unpredictable Life" (from For Eagle Brothers)**; #Annyeong – "So Sick" (from Reunion Counseling); 10cm – "Spring Snow" (from Lovely Runner); 90TAN – "A-Yo" (from Undercover High School); An Yu-jin – "Dreaming" (from The Great); Baek A – "Our Days" (from Better Days); Byun Hee-sang – "Eternity Reprise" (from Eternity); Crush – "Love You with All My Heart" (from Queen of Tears); DK – "Eternity" (from The Last 10 Years); Eclipse – "Sudden Shower" (from Lovely Runner); Elaine "Stand by Me" – (from Buried Hearts); F.T. Island – "The Rose of Verasilles" (from The Siren: Becoming the Villain's Family); Ha Sung-woon – "In Love with You" (from My Dearest Nemesis); Haewon – "Maru is A Puppy" (from Maru is A Puppy); Jin – "Close to You" (from When the Stars Gossip); Jo Yu-ri – "Spring Day Pass" (from Jeongnyeon: The Star Is Born); Jongho – "A Day" (from Lovely Runner); Jung Seung-hwan – "Ask Out" (from Motel California); Kang Seung-yoon – "She Woke Me Up" (from For Eagle Brothers); Kim Feel – "All Our Days" (from Family by Choice); Lee Chang-sub – "Heavenly Fate" (from A Not So Fairytale); Lee Hi – "Our Timeless Moments" (from Dear Hyeri); Lee Jean – "Like that Time When I Sent You with Smile" (from A Virtuous Business); Lee Mu-jin – "In Our Lives" (from Iron Family); MeloMance – "Tomorrow" (from Brewing Love); Minnie – "Like A Dream" (from Lovely Runner); Mr. Choi from Yanbian – "Like the Wind Didn't Blow" (from Like the Wind Didn't Blow); N.Flying – "Star" (from Lovely Runner); Onaye – "Such a Day" (from A Virtous Business); Paul Kim – "Always Be With You" (from Love Scout); Plave – "We Don't Stop" (from The Fiery Priest); Roy Kim – "Whenever Wherever" (from My Demon); Sam Kim – "Playing Pretend" (from Love in the Big City); Seok Matthew & Park Gun-wook – "Back Packer" (from Study Group); Seungmin – "My Destiny" (from The Potato Lab); Sohyang – "One Day" (from The Queen Who Crowns); Son Tae-jin – "I'll Take You in My Arms" (from Desperate Mrs. Seonju); Tomorrow X Together – "Can't Stop" (from Brewing Love); Winter – "The First Moment" (from Heartsping: Teenieping of Love); Yoo Hwe-seung – "I Think I Did" (from Lovely Runner); Yoo Yeon-seok – "Say My Name" (from When the Phone Rings)	**Young Tak**; Ahn Sung-hoon; Bae A-hyun; Cheon Lok-dam; Choi Jae-myung; Choi Soo-ho; Chun-gil; Enoch; Eun Ga-eun; Hong Ja; Hong Ji-yun; Hong Jin-young; Hyukjin; Jang Minho; JD1; Jeon Yu-jin; Jin Hye-sung; Jin Sung; Jinuk; Jung Mi-ae; Jung Min-ko; Jung Seo-joo; Kang Hye-yeon; Kang Jin; Kang Moon-kyung; Kim Da-hyun; Kim Hee-jae; Kim Jun-su; Kim Soo-chan; Kim So-yeon; Kim Tae-yeon; Kim Yang; Kim Yong-bin; Kim Yong-im; Kim Yon-ja; Lee Chan-won; Lim Young-woong; Ma Ij-in; Maria; Min Soo-hyun; Miss Kim; Na Tae-koo; Na Ye-ong; Nam Jin; Nam Seung-min; Oh Yu-jin; Park Hye-sin; Park Ji-hyeon; Park Min-su; Park Seo-jin; Shin Se-ong; Shin Seung-tae; Shin Yu; Son Bin-ah; Son Tae-jin; Song Ga-in; Tae Jin-ah; Yang Ji-eun; Yoyomi
Rising Star Award
**VVUP**; 82Major; Evnne; Fantasy Boys; Lun8; One Pact; Pow; Tempest; TNX; Younite

=== Popularity awards ===
Popularity Award	K-Wave Special Award
**Lee Chan-won**; List of nominated artists: (G)I-dle; Aespa; Ateez; Babymonster; Baekhyun; Bibi; BoyNextDoor; BSS; BtoB; BTS; Crush; D.O.; Day6; Doyoung; Eclipse; Enhypen; Fifty Fifty; G-Dragon; Got7; Hwang Karam; Illit; Itzy; IU; Ive; Izna; JD1; Jennie; Jimin; Jin; Jisoo; Jungkook; JxW; Kang Daniel; Kep1er; Kiss of Life; Le Sserafim; Lee Chang-sub; Lee Mu-jin; Lee Young-ji; Lim Young-woong; Meovv; Minnie; Nayeon; NCT 127; NCT Dream; NCT Wish; NewJeans; Nmixx; One Pact; P1Harmony; Park Ji-hyeon; Plave; QWER; Riize; RM; Rosé; Seventeen; Stray Kids; Taeyeon; The Boyz; Tomorrow X Together; Treasure; TripleS; Twice; TWS; Unis; Wendy; Xikers; Young Tak; Yuqi; Zerobaseone; Zico	**Jimin**; List of nominated artists: (G)I-dle; Aespa; Ateez; Babymonster; Baekhyun; Bibi; BoyNextDoor; BSS; BtoB; BTS; Crush; D.O.; Day6; Doyoung; Eclipse; Enhypen; Fifty Fifty; G-Dragon; Got7; Hwang Karam; Illit; Itzy; IU; Ive; Izna; JD1; Jennie; Jin; Jisoo; Jungkook; JxW; Kang Daniel; Kep1er; Kiss of Life; Le Sserafim; Lee Chang-sub; Lee Chan-won; Lee Mu-jin; Lee Young-ji; Lim Young-woong; Meovv; Minnie; Nayeon; NCT 127; NCT Dream; NCT Wish; NewJeans; Nmixx; One Pact; P1Harmony; Park Ji-hyeon; Plave; QWER; Riize; RM; Rosé; Seventeen; Stray Kids; Taeyeon; The Boyz; Tomorrow X Together; Treasure; TripleS; Twice; TWS; Unis; Wendy; Xikers; Young Tak; Yuqi; Zerobaseone; Zico
K-pop World Choice – Group	K-pop World Choice – Solo
**Babymonster**; List of nominated artists: (G)I-dle; Aespa; Ateez; BoyNextDoor; BSS; BtoB; BTS; Day6; Eclipse; Enhypen; Fifty Fifty; Got7; Illit; Itzy; Ive; Izna; JxW; Kep1er; Kiss of Life; Le Sserafim; Meovv; NCT 127; NCT Dream; NCT Wish; NewJeans; Nmixx; One Pact; P1Harmony; Plave; QWER; Riize; Seventeen; Stray Kids; The Boyz; Tomorrow X Together; Treasure; TripleS; Twice; TWS; Unis; Xikers; Zerobaseone	**Young Tak**; List of nominated artists: Baekhyun; Bibi; Crush; D.O.; Doyoung; G-Dragon; Hwang Karam; IU; JD1; Jennie; Jimin; Jin; Jisoo; Jungkook; Kang Daniel; Lee Chang-sub; Lee Chan-won; Lee Mu-jin; Lee Young-ji; Lim Young-woong; Minnie; Nayeon; Park Ji-hyeon; RM; Rosé; Taeyeon; Wendy; Yuqi; Zico

=== Special awards ===
Best Group Award	Best Performance Award
**Illit**; **NCT Wish**	**Cravity**; **Fifty Fifty**
Best Solo Award	Band Award
**Doyoung**	**Wave to Earth**
K-pop Special Award	Discovery of the Year
**BtoB**	**Say My Name**
World Best Artist
**Aespa**; **Rosé**

== Multiple awards ==
The following artist(s) received two or more awards:

Count	Artist(s)
4	Young Tak
3	Tomorrow X Together
2	Aespa
2	Doyoung
2	I-dle
2	Illit
2	NCT Wish
2	Rosé
2	Zerobaseone
