= Jeong Dong-won =

South Korean singer (born 2007)

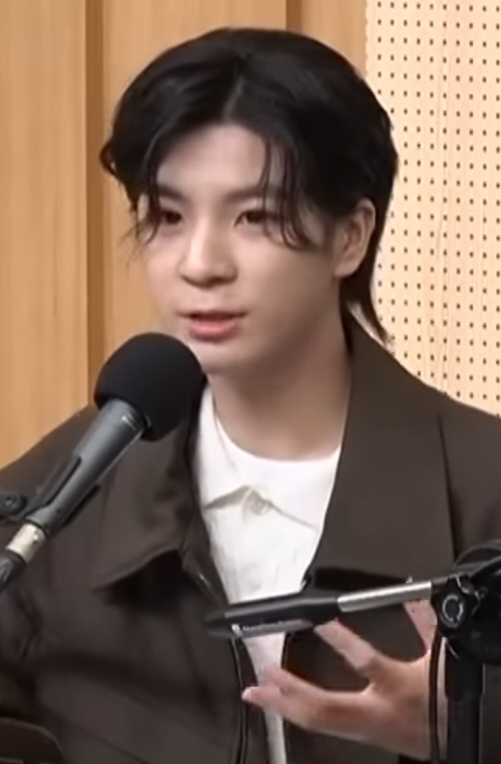
- Jeong in October 2021
- Born: March 19, 2007 (age 19); Hadong County, South Gyeongsang Province, South Korea
- Other name: JD1
- Occupations: Singer; Youtuber; Actor
- Musical career
- Genres: Trot; ballad; K-pop
- Instrument: Vocals
- Years active: 2018–present
- Label: ShowPlay Entertainment

Jeong Dong-Won (Korean: 정동원; born March 19, 2007), also known as Jung Dong-won, is a South Korean trot singer and actor under ShowPlay Entertainment. He made his solo debut on December 18, 2019, with the EP Miracle. In 2020, he appeared on the first season of TV Chosun's Mr. Trot and advanced to the finals at the age of 13, finishing in 5th place. He made his K-pop debut as an "AI Idol" on January 11, 2024, with the single "Who Am I" under the stage name JD1.

== Life and career ==
=== Early life and debut activities ===
Jeong Dong-won was born on March 19, 2007, in Hadong County, South Gyeongsang Province, South Korea. Jeong Dong-won graduated from Jingyo Elementary School in Hadong, Gyeongsangnam-do in February 2020, and entered Jingyo Middle School in March. Jeong Dong-won was transferred to Seoul after passing the test exam at Seonhwa Arts Middle School in Seoul.

In 2018, he appeared on KBS 1TV's Korea Sings (National Singing Contest) and won the Excellence Award. He also participated in the year-end finals of National Singing Contest in December. In July and December 2019, he appeared on SBS's "Gifted Talent Discovery Team", and in December, he appeared on MBC's Hangout with Yoo with Yoo Jae-suk. In November 2019, he appeared in the KBS1 TV documentary "Human Theater".

In June 2020, he participated in a public service advertisement for "Korea Donghaeng Sale" for his first CF, and "Let's Accompany", an adapted version of the lyrics of Jeong Dong-won's debut song "Let's Be Filial", was used as a campaign song.

In October 2020, he sang a partner song in a duet with singer Nam Jin, a legendary singer and role model, on the opening stage of TV Chosun's 2020 Trot Awards.

He appeared on TV Chosun's Romantic Call Centre, Taste of Wife, and participated as a judge on the second season of Miss Trot.

On September 11, 2021, Jeong Dong-won's contract with New Era Project expired and the management contract between Mr. Trot and TV Chosun ended, and he returned to his original agency, ShowPlay Entertainment.

== Discography ==
=== Studio albums ===
List of studio albums, showing selected details, selected chart positions, and sales figures
Title	Details	Peak chart positions	Sales
Title	Details	KOR	Sales
The Giving Tree (그리움, 아낌없이 주는 나무)	Released: November 17, 2021; Label: ShowPlay; Formats: CD, digital download, streaming	2	
Handwritten Letter (손편지)	Released: April 25, 2022; Label: ShowPlay; Formats: CD, digital download, streaming	5	
Man (사내)	Released: December 1, 2022; Label: ShowPlay; Formats: CD, digital download, streaming	6	
The Gift of Daddy-Long-Legs (키다리의 선물)	Released: March 13, 2025; Label: ShowPlay; Formats: CD, digital download, streaming	6	KOR: 152,923
Collection of Props Vol. 2 (소품집 Vol.2)	Released: February 6, 2026; Label: ShowPlay; Formats: CD, digital download, streaming	17	KOR: 5,162

=== Single albums ===
List of single albums, showing selected details, selected chart positions, and sales figures
Title	Details	Peak chart positions	Sales
Title	Details	KOR	Sales
Be Responsible (책임져)	Released: October 12, 2024; Label: ShowPlay; Formats: CD, digital download, streaming	14	KOR: 37,373
Loop of Love (고리)	Released: November 11, 2024; Label: ShowPlay; Formats: CD, digital download, streaming	13	KOR: 46,458

=== Singles ===
List of singles, showing year released, selected chart positions, and name of the album
Title	Year	Peak chart positions	Album
Title	Year	KOR	Album
Jeong Dong-won
"My Favorite"	2021	— (Note: "My Favorite" did not enter on the Circle Digital Chart but peaked at number 5 on the Circle Download Chart.)	My Favorite
"Goodbye My Love"	2021	152	The Giving Tree
"Angel's Hair"	2022	— (Note: "Angel's Hair" did not enter on the Circle Digital Chart but peaked at number 6 on the Circle Download Chart.)	Handwritten Letter
"Baennori"	2022	199	Man
"Monologue"	2023	— (Note: "Monologue" did not enter on the Circle Digital Chart but peaked at number 5 on the Circle Download Chart.)	Collection of Props Vol.1
JD1
"Who Am I"	2024	— (Note: "Who Am I" did not enter on the Circle Digital Chart but peaked at number 3 on the Circle Download Chart.)	Non-album singles
"Error 405"	2024	— (Note: "Error 405" did not enter on the Circle Digital Chart but peaked at number 11 on the Circle Download Chart and number 8 on the Circle Album Chart.)	Non-album singles
"Easy Lover"	2025	— (Note: "Easy Lover" did not enter on the Circle Digital Chart but peaked at number 4 on the Circle Download Chart.)	Non-album singles
"—" denotes releases that did not chart on that region.

== Filmography ==
=== Television shows ===
Year	Title		Role	Notes	Ref.
Year	English	Korean	Role	Notes	Ref.
2018	Korea Sings	전국노래자랑	Contestant	Excellence Award	
2020	Mr. Trot	내일은 미스터트롯	Contestant	5th place	
2020–2021	Romantic Call Centre	사랑의 콜센타	Main Cast	Seasons 1–2	
2020	Knowing Bros	아는 형님	Guest	Mr. Trot Top 7	
2020–2021	Miss Trot	내일은 미스트롯	Guest	Season 2	
2024	Country Life of Gen Z	시골에 간 도시 Z	Cast member		

== Awards and nominations ==
Name of the award ceremony, year presented, award category, nominee(s) of the award, and the result of the nomination
Award ceremony	Year	Category	Nominee(s) / Work(s)	Result	Ref.
Asia Artist Awards	2026	Popularity Award – Solo (Male)	Jeong Dong-won	Pending	
Asia Star Entertainer Awards	2024	Fan Choice Rookie	Jeong Dong-won	Won	
Broadcast Advertising Festival	2022	Rookie Star Award	Jeong Dong-won	Won	
Hanteo Music Awards	2023	Post Generation Award	Jeong Dong-won	Won	
Hanteo Music Awards	2024	Best Popular Solo Artist	Jeong Dong-won	Won	
Hanteo Music Awards	2024	Post Generation Award	Jeong Dong-won	Nominated	
Melon Music Awards	2020	Best Trot Award	Jeong Dong-won	Nominated	
Melon Music Awards	2020	Hot Trend Award (Note: nominated as a member of Trot Men 6.)	Jeong Dong-won	Won	
Seoul Music Awards	2022	Best Trot Award	Jeong Dong-won	Nominated	
Seoul Music Awards	2023	Best Trot Award	Jeong Dong-won	Nominated	
Seoul Music Awards	2024	Best Trot Award	Jeong Dong-won	Nominated	
