= Na Hoon-a =

South Korean trot singer (born 1947)

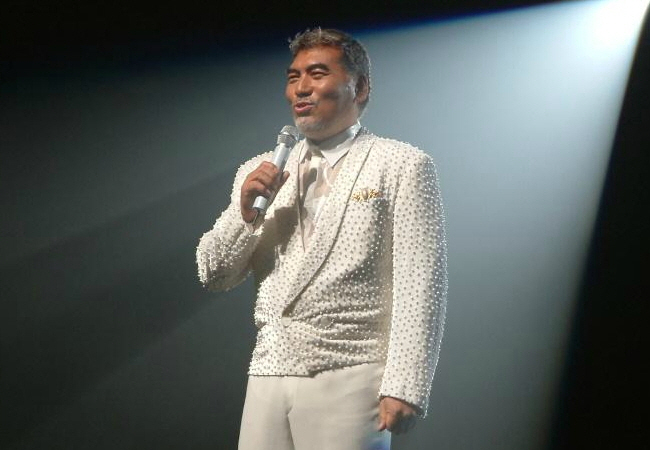
- Na in 2017
- Born: Choi Hong-gi; February 11, 1947 (age 79); Busan, Gyeongnam, South Korea
- Occupation: Singer
- Years active: 1966–present
- Musical career
- Genre: Trot
- Instrument: Vocals

Korean name
- Hangul: 최홍기
- Hanja: 崔弘基
- RR: Choe Honggi
- MR: Ch'oe Honggi

Stage name
- Hangul: 나훈아
- Hanja: 羅勳兒
- RR: Na Huna
- MR: Na Huna

Choi Hong-gi (Korean: 최홍기; February 11, 1951), known professionally as Na Hoon-a (Korean: 나훈아), is a South Korean trot singer who debuted in 1966.

== Public image ==
Na Hoon-a is often referred to as the "Emperor of Trot" due to his charismatic personality and powerful voice. He was one of the country's most popular singers of the 1970s, alongside his rival Nam Jin. Na made international headlines in 2008 when he pulled down his pants on live television to dispel rumors that he had been castrated by a Japanese gangster. He is a legendary trot singer, and often appears on the KBS 1TV Golden Oldies (가요무대).

== Albums ==
Year	Title
1966	Long-Distance Road
1969	Love Is the Seed of Tears
1969	I Want to See You, Dear
1970	Jeong Hunhui / Na Hoon-a (omnibus)
1972	Na Hoon-a 7th
1972	Persimmon Tree Village
1977	The Way To Find You / Hold Both Hands
1981	'81 Na Hoon-a 1st
1984	Youth Confession
1989	22nd Anniversary New Song
1990	Na Hoon-a 25nd Anniversary New Song
1992	92 New Album
1993	New Song Album Commemorating the Introduction of 2000 Songs
1995	30th Anniversary '1995' New Album
1999	Life
2001	Like Adam and Eve (with Bae Jong-ok)
2003	Feeling Album: None
2005	Friend - 40th Anniversary Special Album
2005	New Free Style
2006	Bonus - 40th Anniversary New Album
2017	Man's Life - Dream Again
2019	Friend 2
2020	Nine Stories

== Filmography ==
=== Television show ===
Year	Title	Network	Role	Ref.
2022	Virtual Song Top Ten	KBS World	Main Cast	
