= Hyun Cheol =

South Korean singer (1942–2024)

- Born: Kang Sang-soo; July 29, 1942; Busan, Korea, Empire of Japan
- Died: July 15, 2024 (aged 81) Seoul, South Korea
- Genre: Trot
- Occupation: Singer
- Years active: 1969–2020

Korean name
- Hangul: 현철
- Hanja: 玄哲
- RR: Hyeon Cheol
- MR: Hyŏn Ch'ŏl

Kang Sang-soo (Korean: 강상수; Hanja: 姜祥秀; July 29, 1942 – July 15, 2024), known professionally as Hyun Cheol (현철; 玄哲), was a South Korean singer, considered one of the "four emperors of trot" due to his fame during the late 1980s.

== Biography ==
Born in 1942 in Busan, Hyun Cheol studied at Dong-a University. He made his debut in 1969 with the song My Heartless Love, after which he joined the band Hyun Chul & Bees, which achieved little success. He achieved success as a solo artist in 1982 with the hits I Think of You Whenever I Sit or Stand and Love Is Like a Butterfly, becoming one of the most popular singers of the late 1980s and being considered part of the "four emperors of trot" along with Sul Woon-do, Tae Jin-ah and Song Dae-kwan. In 1989 and 1990 he won the grand prize at the KBS Music Awards for Garden Balsam Love and Not Anymore, respectively.

Hyun Cheol's health began to deteriorate after cervical disc surgery that caused damage to his nervous system and forced him to stop musical activity to focus on recovery. His last television appearance was in episode 74 of Immortal Songs in 2020. In the spring of 2024 he was admitted to the intensive care unit of a Guui-dong hospital in Seoul after falling ill with pneumonia. He died on July 15 and, after a funeral held at Asan Hospital in the South Korean capital, was buried at Bundang Memorial Park.
