= Park Ji-hyeon =

South Korean trot singer (born 1995)

- Park in 2025

Background information
- Born: December 12, 1995 (age 30); Mokpo, South Jeolla, South Korea
- Education: Honam University (Department of Chinese Language)
- Genre: Trot
- Occupation: Singer
- Years active: 2023–present
- Labels: Grace E&M

Korean name
- Hangul: 박지현
- RR: Bak Jihyeon
- MR: Pak Chihyŏn

Park Ji-hyeon (Korean: 박지현; born December 12, 1995) is a South Korean trot singer. He won second place in the Mr. Trot 2 and debuted as a singer in 2023.

== Early life and education ==
Park was born on December 12, 1995 in Mokpo, South Jeolla, South Korea. He attended Mokpodong Elementary School, Younghwa Middle School, Mokpo–Technical High School. He later majored in the Department of Chinese Language at Honam University.

During his fourth year of elementary school, Park lived and studied in Shanghai, China, for two years.

Park completed his mandatory military service as an Auxiliary Police officer in the Korea Coast Guard, having enlisted through a special recruitment program for individuals with proficiency in Chinese.

Park worked in the fishing industry through his family business before pursuing a singing career.

== Career ==
In 2022, Park participated as a contestant on the TV Chosun trot music reality competition Mr. Trot Season 2. He consistently ranked among the top contestants and ultimately finished in second place. Known as an all-rounder during the competition, he gained significant public attention following the show.

On June 13, 2024, Park released his first single "I Like It When You Smile" and participated in writing the lyrics. The song debuted at number one on the Circle Download Chart.

On January 13, 2025, Park released his first extended play, OCEAN. The album's title reflects the place where he was born and raised. Its lead single, "Man of the Sea", was released alongside the album. Park also participated in writing the lyrics for "Mokpo Blues", expressing his sincere feelings for his mother. The sales reached more than 250,000 copies in the first week since release.

On June 30, 2025, Park released the single "It Melts", with Jang Yoon-jeong participating in the writing and composing.

In February 2026, Park appeared under the new agency Grace E&M. On February 23, he released his first studio album MASTER VOICE, with the title track "Mu 무(無)" All the songs from the album topped the charts immediately after their release. The sales successfully surpass the 250,000 copies in the first week.

== Discography ==
=== Studio album ===
List of studio albums, with selected details, selected chart positions, sales figures, and certifications
| Title | Details | Peak chart positions | Sales | Certifications |
| Title | Details | KOR | Sales | Certifications |
|---|---|---|---|---|
| Master Voice | Released: February 23, 2026; Label: Grace.E&M; Formats: CD, digital download, streaming; Track listing: 1. Opening; 2. Mu (무(無)); 3. Prayer (기도); 4. A Beautiful Life Story (아름다운 인생 이야기); 5. Dancing in Love; 6. Goodbye Is a Sad Word (안녕이란 슬픈 말); 7. Heartache (애간장); 8. Everything Truck (만물트럭); 9. Invitation (초대장); 10. Mu (Inst.) (무(無) (Inst.)) | 4 | KOR: 253,591 | KMCA: Platinum |

=== Extended plays ===
List of extended plays, showing selected details, selected chart positions, sales figures, and certifications
| Title | Details | Peak chart positions | Sales | Certifications |
| Title | Details | KOR | Sales | Certifications |
|---|---|---|---|---|
| Ocean | Released: January 13, 2025; Label: TN Entertainment; Formats: CD, digital download, streaming; Track listing: 1. Man of the Sea (바다 사나이); 2. Mokpo Blues (목포 부르스); 3. Harbor Farewell (항구의 이별); 4. We Can Make It (우리는 된다니까); 5. Harbor Farewell (Part.2) (항구의 이별 된다니까(Part.2)); 6. Man of the Sea (Inst.) (바다 사나이 (Inst.)) | 1 | KOR: 250,967 | KMCA: Platinum |

=== Singles ===
| Title | Year | Peak chart positions | Album |
| Title | Year | KOR DL | Album |
As lead artist
| "I Like It When You Smile" (그대가 웃으면 좋아) | 2024 | 1 | Non-album single |
| "Man of the Sea" (바다 사나이) | 2025 | 2 | Ocean |
| "It Melts" (녹아 버려요) | 2025 | 3 | Non-album single |
| "Mu" (무(無)) | 2026 | 4 | Master Voice |
Soundtrack appearances
| "By Your Side" (너의 곁에) | 2024 | 15 | DNA Lover OST Part.2 |
| "Nasty Man" (얄미운 사람) | 2025 | 6 | Nice to Not Meet You OST Part.2 |
| "One's Life" (사는 게 다) | 2026 | 13 | Recipe for Love Part.3 |

== Filmography ==
=== Television shows ===
| Year | Title | Role | Notes | Ref. |
|---|---|---|---|---|
| 2022–2023 | Mr. Trot 2 | Contestant | | |
| 2023 | Tralala Brothers | Cast member | | |
| 2023–2024 | Mr. Lotto | Participant | | |
| 2023–2024 | Miss Trot 3 | Judge | | |
| 2024–present | I Live Alone | Regular member | | |
| 2024 | The Determination | Cast member | | |
| 2024 | Tralala Traveling Group | Cast member | | |
| 2024 | Mr. Trot 3 | Judge | | |
| 2025 | My Turn | Cast member | | |
| 2025 | It's Okay to Be Lost | Cast member | | |
| 2025 | Miss Trot 4 | Judge | | |
| 2026 | 1st Singer | Panelist | | |
| 2026 | K-Trot Chart | MC | | |
| 2026 | The Listen: The Season We Stayed | Cast member | Season 6 | |

== Accolades ==
=== Awards and nominations ===
Name of the award ceremony, year presented, category, nominee of the award, and the result of the nomination
| Award ceremony | Year | Category | Nominee / Work | Result | Ref. |
|---|---|---|---|---|---|
| Hanteo Music Awards | 2026 | Best Adult Contemporary | Park Ji-hyeon | Won | |
| Korea First Brand Awards | 2026 | Trottainer (Rising Star) | Park Ji-hyeon | Won | |
| Korea Grand Music Awards | 2024 | Trend of the Year – Trot Rookie | Park Ji-hyeon | Won | |
| K-World Dream Awards | 2025 | Best Trot Artist | Park Ji-hyeon | Won | |
| K-World Dream Awards | 2025 | Popularity Award | Park Ji-hyeon | Won | |
| K-World Dream Awards | 2026 | Best Trot Artist | Park Ji-hyeon | Won | |
| K-World Dream Awards | 2026 | Popularity Award | Park Ji-hyeon | Won | |
| MBC Entertainment Awards | 2025 | Popularity Award Male | I Live Alone | Won | |
| MTN Broadcasting Advertising Festival | 2026 | Excellence Award – CF Star | Park Ji-hyeon | Won | |
| Trot Music Awards | 2025 | Top 10 Singer Award | Park Ji-hyeon | Won | |

=== Listicles ===
Name of publisher, year listed, name of listicle, and placement
| Publisher | Year | Listicle | Placement | Ref. |
|---|---|---|---|---|
| Forbes | 2023 | Korea Power Celebrity 40 | 31st | |
| Forbes | 2024 | Korea Power Celebrity 40 | 37th | |
