= Yoon Soo-il =

South Korean musician (born 1955)

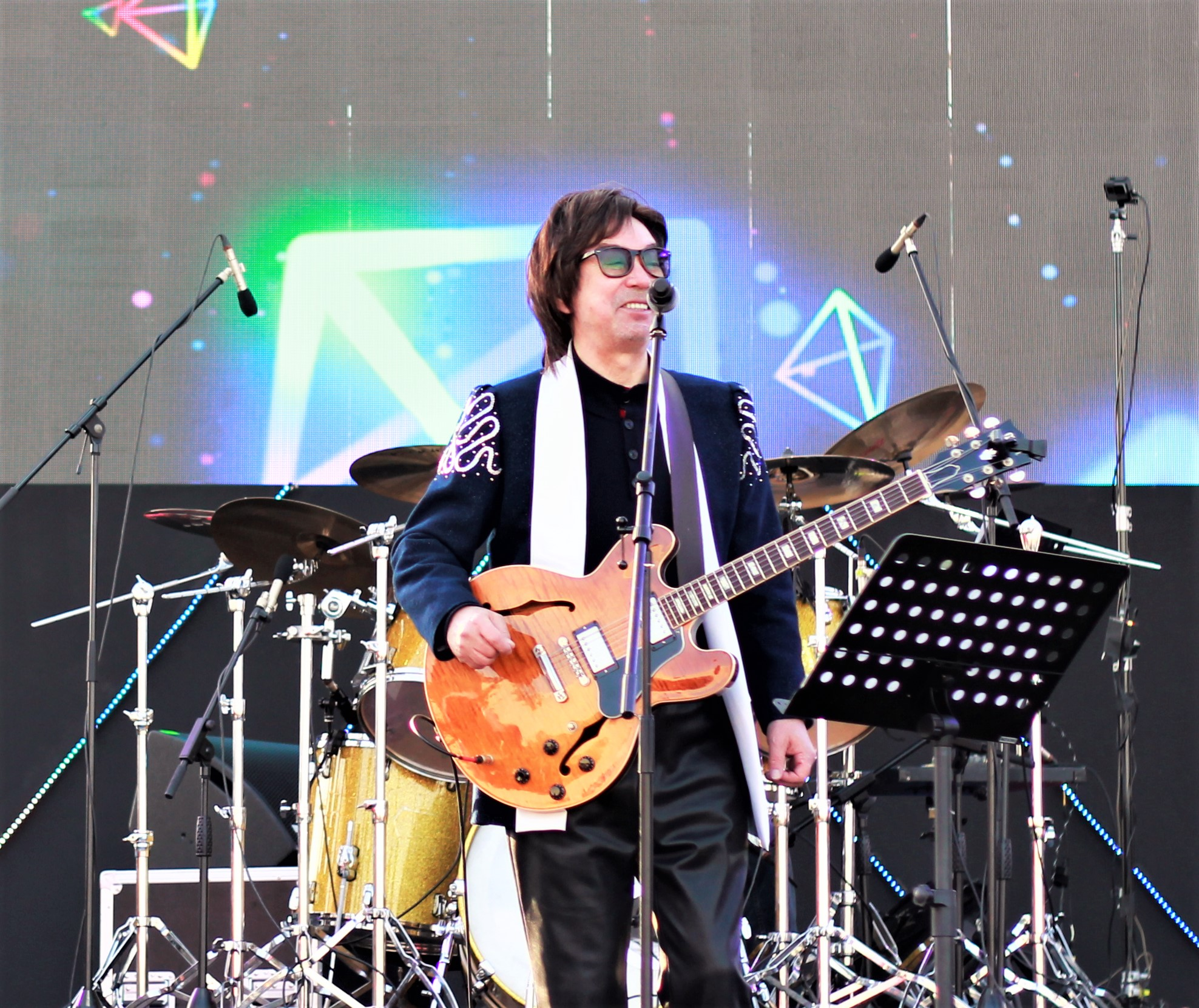
- Yoon in 2019

Background information
- Born: February 6, 1955 (age 71); Ulsan, South Korea
- Genres: Trot, Pop rock
- Occupations: Singer, songwriter
- Years active: 1974–present

Korean name
- Hangul: 윤수일
- Hanja: 尹秀一
- RR: Yun Suil
- MR: Yun Suil

Yoon Soo-il (Korean: 윤수일; born February 6, 1955) is a South Korean singer-songwriter. He is the represented by Nurimaru Entertainment. He is known for hits such as "Anything But You" and "Apartment". He also served as the president of the Korean Mixed Race Association.

== Early life ==
Yoon Soo-il was born on February 6, 1955 to a white American father who was stationed in a military base in South Korea and a Korean mother. After graduating from Hakseong High School, he attended the University of Ulsan.

== Musical career ==
In 1977, Yoon made his debut as a singer with the trot go-go style song "Anything But You" as part of the group sounds band "Yoon Soo-il and Cotton Candy". In 1978, Anything But You won the Best Popular Song Award at the MBC Gayo Daejejeon. In 1981, he formed the Yoon Soo-il Band and switched to pop rock. In 1982, he released "Apartment." In 1986, he released "Ecstatic Confession."

In late 2024, Yoon returned to public attention due to reviving interest in his 1982 hit "Apartment" (아파트), which has seen a 190% streaming increase on Genie Music following the release of Rosé and Bruno Mars' duet "Apt." In a phone interview with Yonhap News, He expressed gratitude for the revival, stating, "I am grateful that Rosé and Bruno Mars reconstructed my song". He also noted the positive reception of viral mixes and highlighted the catchy "apateu apateu" line.
