= Nam Jin =

South Korean singer (born 1946)

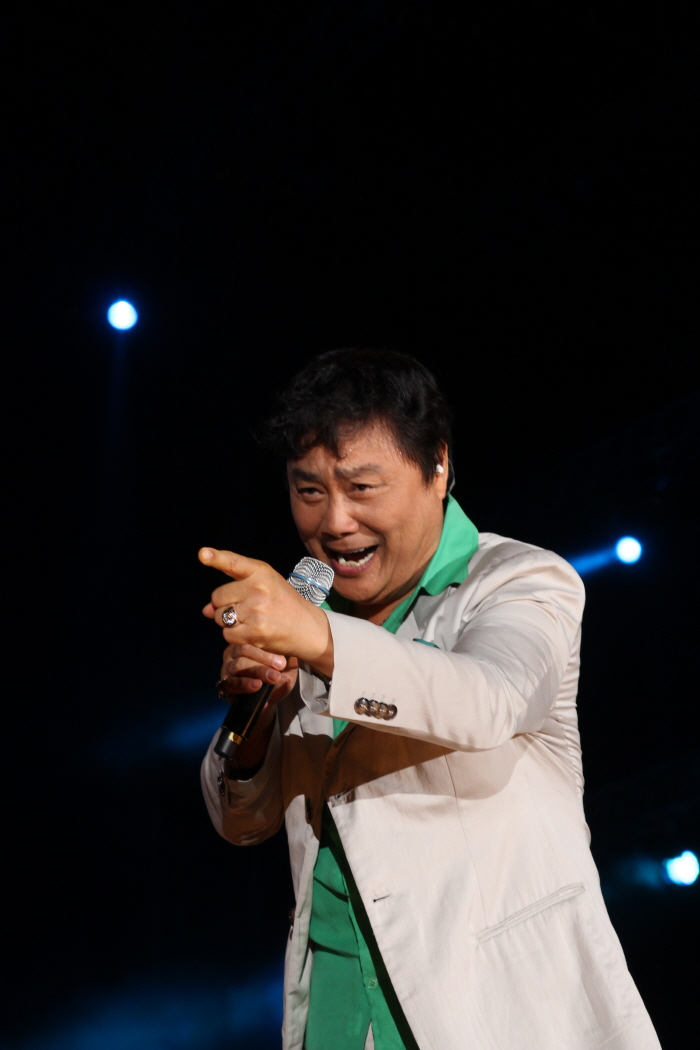

Background information
- Born: September 27, 1946 (age 80); Mokpo, South Jeolla Province, South Korea
- Genre: Trot
- Occupations: Singer
- Years active: 1965-present

Korean name
- Hangul: 김남진
- Hanja: 金南鎭
- RR: Gim Namjin
- MR: Kim Namjin

Stage name
- Hangul: 남진
- Hanja: 南鎭
- RR: Nam Jin
- MR: Nam Chin

Nam Jin (Korean: 남진; born September 27, 1946) is a South Korean trot singer. He debuted in 1965 with the album Seoul Playboy, and became one of South Korea's most popular singers of the 1960s and 1970s.

== Biography ==
=== Early life ===
Nam Jin was born Kim Nam-jin in 1946 in Mokpo, South Jeolla Province, South Korea. His father Kim Moon Ok, was a publisher of the Mokpo Daily, and was a notable figure as a member of parliament for the opposition, which made his family wealthy. His mother was Jang Gi-Soon.

=== 1960s ===
Originally Nam wanted to be an actor, but he trained at Han Dong-hoon's music academy for two years. Han eventually produced Nam's pop debut album “Seoul Playboy” which was released in 1965 but was a commercial failure. After moving to Oasis Records, his 2nd album "Did I Come Here to Cry?" became a huge hit. His acting career began in 1967 with the film Heartbreaking. His film Longing Is Every Heart sold 100,000 tickets at theaters. In 1968 he enlisted in the Blue Dragon Korean Marine Corp for the Vietnam War.

=== 1970s ===
He was discharged from the military in 1971. His 1972 single "Together with My Lover" (임과 함께) became a huge pop hit. He married singer Yoon Bok-hee in 1976.

=== 1980s ===
Nam’s career opportunities were limited by the government in the early 1980s, putting a damper on his career. This prompted him to move to the United States for a short time before returning to South Korea and releasing "Empty Cup" in 1982.

=== 2000s ===
He often appears on the KBS 1TV Golden Oldies (Korean: 가요무대).

== Filmography ==
=== Television shows ===
Year	Title	Role	Ref.
2021	With Rumors	Host	
2022	Our Namjin	Host	
2022	Burning Trotman	Judge	

== Ambassadorship ==
- Hwasun-gun's public relations ambassador (2022)

== Awards ==
=== Korean Popular Culture and Arts Awards ===
Year	Category	Recipient	Result	Ref.
2017	Order of Cultural Merits	Nam Jin	Won	

=== MBC Ten Singers Match ===
Year	Category	Recipient	Result	Ref.
1971	King of Ten Singers	"Should Have a Beautiful Heart" (마음이 고와야지)	Won	
1972	King of Ten Singers	"With My Dear" (님과 함께)	Won	
1973	King of Ten Singers	"Don't Change, My Dear" (그대여 변치마오)	Won	

=== TBC Broadcast Music Awards ===
Year	Category	Recipient	Result	Ref.
1969	Best Song (Male Artist)	"My Heart Aches" (가슴 아프게)	Won	
1971	Best Song (Male Artist)	"Should Have a Beautiful Heart"	Won	
1973	Best Song (Male Artist)	"Don't Change, My Dear"	Won	
