= List of awards and nominations received by Taeyang =

Taeyang awards and nominations
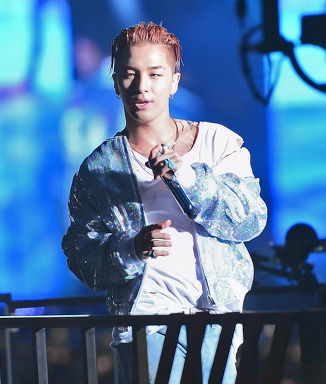
- Taeyang at 0.TO.10's Seoul concert in 2016
Awards and nominations
Award	Wins	Nominations
Asian Pop Music Awards	0	2
Bugs Music Awards	1	1
Channel [V] Asia	1	1
Gaon Chart Music Awards	1	2
Golden Disc Awards	2	4
iF Design Award	1	1
Korean Music Awards	3	3
MBN Awards	1	1
Mnet Asian Music Awards	4	18
Melon Music Awards	3	7
Myx Music Awards	0	1
Naver Music Awards	1	1
Red Dot Design Awards	1	1
RTHK International Pop Poll Awards	0	1
SBS Awards Festival	2	2
SBS MTV Best of the Best	0	3
Seoul Music Awards	0	3
Style Icon Awards	0	1
Tudou Young Choice Awards	1	1
YinYuTai 3rd V-Chart Awards	1	1

Totals (Note: Certain award groups do not simply award one winner. They acknowledge several different recipients, have runners-up, and have third place. Since this is a specific recognition and is different from losing an award, runner-up mentions are considered wins in this award tally. For simplification and to avoid errors, each award in this list has been presumed to have had a prior nomination.)
- Wins: 24
- Nominations: 56

South Korean singer, songwriter and dancer Taeyang debuted as a member of boy group BigBang under YG Entertainment in August 2006. He made his solo debut with the extended play (EP) Hot in May 2008, which earned him various prizes at award shows in South Korea, including Best R&B / Soul Album and Best R&B / Soul Song for its single "Only Look at Me" at the 2009 Korean Music Awards. "Only Look at Me" was also named the Song of the Year for 2008 at the Naver Music Awards. His first studio album Solar was released in July 2010 to commercial success and led him to winning the Best Male Artist award at the 2010 Mnet Asian Music Awards.

In 2014, Taeyang released his second studio album Rise which spawned the commercially successful single "Eyes, Nose, Lips". It was ranked the 2nd best performing single of the year on the Gaon Digital Chart and won numerous awards at domestic award shows, including Song of the Year at the MAMA Awards, Melon Music Awards and Golden Disc Awards, among others.

== Awards and nominations ==
Name of the award ceremony, year presented, category, nominee of the award, and the result of the nomination
Organization	Year	Category	Nominee / work	Result	Ref.
Asian Pop Music Awards	2023	Best Collaboration (Overseas)	"Vibe" (featuring Jimin)	Nominated	
Asian Pop Music Awards	2023	Best Male Artist (Overseas)	Taeyang	Nominated	
Bugs Music Awards	2014	Best Male Singer	Taeyang	Won	
Channel [V] Asia	2014	Best K-pop Song of 2014	"Eyes, Nose, Lips"	Won	
Gaon Chart Music Awards	2014	Song of the Year (June)	"Eyes, Nose, Lips"	Won	
Gaon Chart Music Awards	2014	Album of the Year (2nd Quarter)	Rise	Nominated	
Golden Disc Awards	2015	Digital Daesang (Song of the Year)	"Eyes, Nose, Lips"	Won	
Golden Disc Awards	2015	Digital Bonsang	Taeyang	Won	
Golden Disc Awards	2018	Disk Bonsang	White Night	Nominated	
Golden Disc Awards	2018	Popularity Award	White Night	Nominated	
iF Design Award	2016	Album Design	Rise	Won	
Korean Music Awards	2009	Best R&B / Soul Song	"Only Look at Me"	Won	
Korean Music Awards	2009	Best R&B / Soul Album	Hot	Won	
Korean Music Awards	2011	Netizen's Choice: Male Musician of the Year	Taeyang	Won	
MBN Awards	2014	Best Album	Rise	Won	
Melon Music Awards	2014	Top 10	Taeyang	Won	
Melon Music Awards	2014	Best R&B/Soul Award	"Eyes, Nose, Lips"	Nominated	
Melon Music Awards	2014	Song of the Year	"Eyes, Nose, Lips"	Won	
Melon Music Awards	2014	Artist of the Year	Taeyang	Nominated	
Melon Music Awards	2014	Album of the Year	Rise	Nominated	
Melon Music Awards	2023	Top 10 Artists	Taeyang	Nominated	
Mnet Asian Music Awards	2008	Best Male Artist	"Only Look at Me"	Nominated	
Mnet Asian Music Awards	2008	Best Ballad/R&B Performance	"Only Look at Me"	Nominated	
Mnet Asian Music Awards	2008	Best Music Video	"Prayer"	Nominated	
Mnet Asian Music Awards	2010	Best Male Artist	"I'll Be There"	Won	
Mnet Asian Music Awards	2010	Best Dance Performance - Solo	"I'll Be There"	Nominated	
Mnet Asian Music Awards	2010	Best Music Video	"I'll Be There"	Nominated	
Mnet Asian Music Awards	2010	Album of the Year	Solar	Nominated	
Mnet Asian Music Awards	2014	Song of the Year	"Eyes, Nose, Lips"	Won	
Mnet Asian Music Awards	2014	Best Vocal Performance - Male	"Eyes, Nose, Lips"	Won	
Mnet Asian Music Awards	2014	Best Male Artist	Taeyang	Won	
Mnet Asian Music Awards	2014	Artist of the Year	Taeyang	Nominated	
Mnet Asian Music Awards	2023	Best Male Artist	Taeyang	Nominated	
Mnet Asian Music Awards	2023	Artist of the Year	Taeyang	Nominated	
Mnet Asian Music Awards	2023	Worldwide Fans' Choice Top 10	Taeyang	Nominated	
Mnet Asian Music Awards	2023	Song of the Year	"Vibe" (featuring Jimin)	Nominated	
Mnet Asian Music Awards	2023	Best Dance Performance Male Solo	"Vibe" (featuring Jimin)	Nominated	
Mnet Asian Music Awards	2023	Best Collaboration	"Vibe" (featuring Jimin)	Nominated	
Mnet Asian Music Awards	2023	Album of the Year	Down to Earth	Nominated	
Myx Music Awards	2015	Favorite K-Pop Video	"Eyes, Nose, Lips"	Nominated	
Naver Music Awards	2008	Song of the Year	"Only Look at Me"	Won	
Philippine K-pop Awards	2014	Song of the Year	"Eyes, Nose, Lips"	Won	
Red Dot Design Awards	2015	Communication Design	Rise	Won	
RTHK International Pop Poll Awards	2015	Top Ten International Gold Songs	"Eyes, Nose, Lips"	Nominated	
SBS Awards Festival	2014	Top 10 Artist	Taeyang	Won	
SBS Awards Festival	2014	Best Male Solo	Taeyang	Won	
SBS MTV Best of the Best	2013	Best Male Solo	Taeyang	Nominated	
SBS MTV Best of the Best	2014	Best Male Solo	Taeyang	Nominated	
SBS MTV Best of the Best	2014	Artist of the Year	Taeyang	Nominated	
Seoul Music Awards	2024	Hallyu Special Award	Taeyang	Nominated	
Seoul Music Awards	2024	Main Award (Bonsang)	Taeyang	Nominated	
Seoul Music Awards	2024	Popularity Award	Taeyang	Nominated	
Style Icon Awards	2014	Top 50 Style Icons	Taeyang	Nominated	
So-Loved Awards	2014	Best Male Solo Artist	Taeyang	Won	
Soompi Awards	2014	Best Male Solo Artist	Taeyang	Won	
YinYuTai V-Chart Awards	2015	Best Male Artist	Taeyang	Won	

== Listicles ==
Name of publisher, year listed, name of listicle, and placement
Publisher	Year	Listicle	Placement	Ref.
GQ Korea	2008	Men of the Year	Placed	
GQ Korea	2010	Men of the Year	Placed	
GQ Korea	2017	Men of the Year	Placed	
MBN Star (Pop Culture Division)	2014	Role Model of the Year	5th	

== See also ==
- List of awards and nominations received by Big Bang
- List of awards and nominations received by GD X Taeyang
