= Grips-Theater =

Coordinates: 52°31′7″N 13°20′31″E

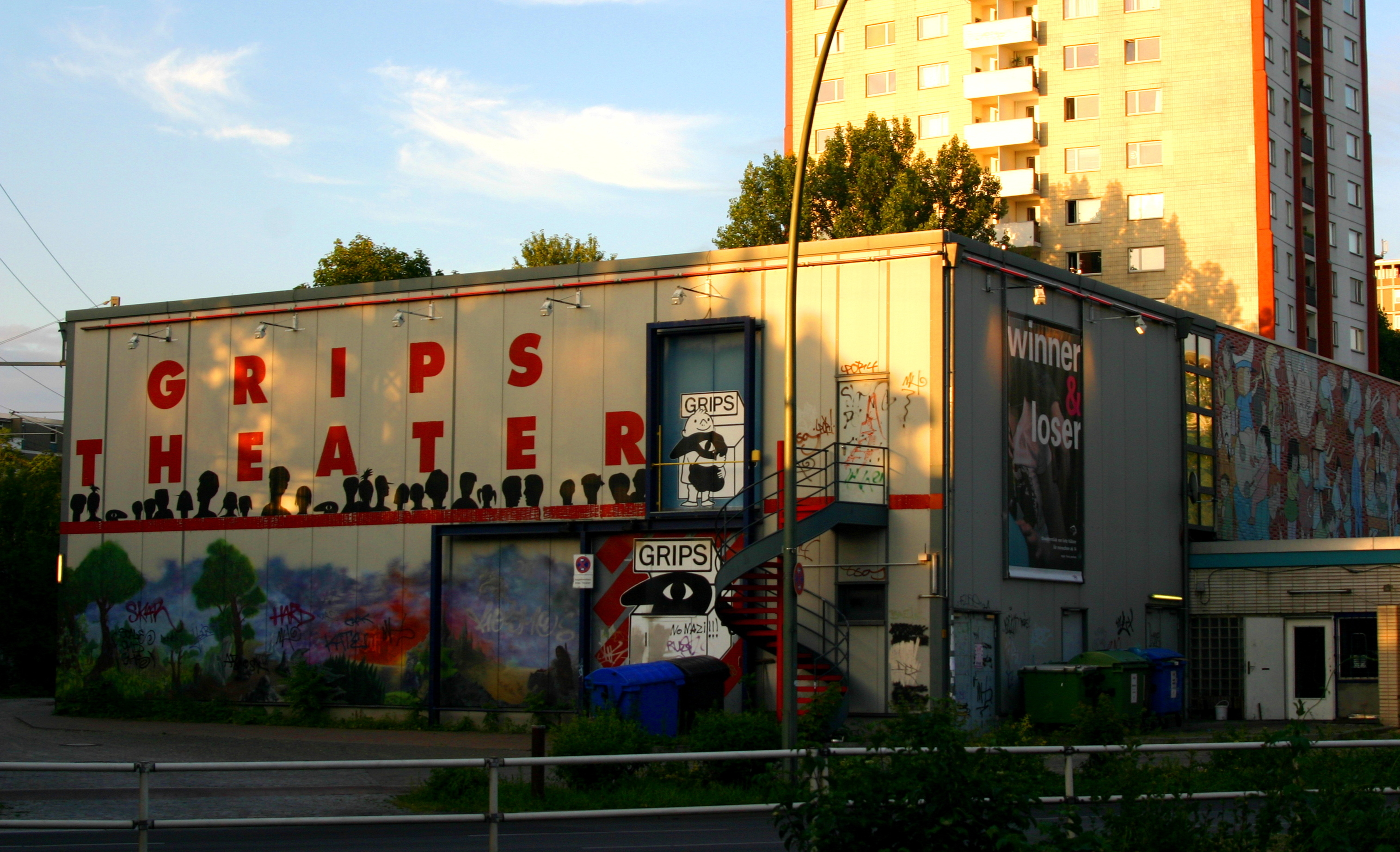
The Grips-Theater at Hansaplatz in Berlin

The Grips-Theatre in Berlin (official name: GRIPS Theater) is a well-known and well-respected emancipatory children's and youth theatre, located at Altonaer Straße at Hansaplatz in the Hansaviertel in Berlin's Mitte district. It is "the first theatre worldwide to deal sociocritically with the lives and living conditions of children and young people and to incorporate this in original humorous and musical plays". It has gained a national and international reputation, not least due to its former artistic director Volker Ludwig's musicals for adults, such as its evergreen Linie 1, Café Mitte or the adaptation of Aldous Huxley's Brave New World. GRIPS' plays have been re-staged over 1,500 times in some 40 languages around the world.

== History ==
=== Origins ===
In 1966, a children's theatre was formed at the Berlin Reichskabarett, "a student group that created programs and satirical sketches interspersed with topical songs". Volker Ludwig, who would go on to serve as the GRIPS-Theatre's artistic director for nearly four decades, was one of the authors and co-founders of the group, which defined itself as part of the Außerparlamentarische Opposition (German for extra-parliamentary opposition), a political protest movement in West Germany during the latter half of the 1960s and early 1970s, which formed a central part of the German student movement. In the summer of 1966, the group began performing plays for children on weekends, starting with the satirically reworked fairy tale The Devil with the Three Golden Hairs.

Gradually, the group performed more and more plays for children to provide an alternative to the fairy tale plays that were a staple of children's theatre at the time. Instead, the group developed plays written expressly for children and dealing with issues faced by children, which fairy tale plays addressed only insufficiently or not at all. In 1968, Volker Ludwig and his brother, the caricaturist Rainer Hachfeld, wrote the first of these plays, titled "The Journey to Pitschepatsch" (Die Reise nach Pitschepatsch). It features a girl protagonist, named Millipilli, who travels to a far-away island to save Santa Claus's tree, which wilts away after being neglected by the adults.

In 1969, the group agreed to develop children's plays that would include more elements of social critique. This resulted in the first sociocritical children's play, titled "Stokkerlok und Millipilli", also written by Ludwig and Hachfeld. The play follows a little boy named Maximilian who blackmails his family and surroundings into child-friendly behaviour with an ear-piercing whistle. "Stokkerlok und Millipilli" is considered the GRIPS-Theatre's first play and became a great success. Theatres across Germany staged performances of the play, which was also adapted by theatres in other countries. In 1969, it was awarded the Brother Grimm Award, conferred by the Berlin government.

The then relatively new concept of a modern children's theatre with a sociocritical background wasn't welcomed by everyone, particularly not by conservative circles. The theatre faced significant criticism for its child protagonists who were often barefaced and disrespectful towards adults. However, an emphasis on children's emancipation and child rights was entirely intended by the authors. The children's theatre's ensemble cast frequently interviewed the children and youths attending their performances to learn what issues were on their minds. A recurring topic were gender roles, including the then-typical path of girls becoming housewives instead of pursuing a career, and in the 1970s, the troupe developed more and more plays dealing with that subject.

=== Split ===
In 1971, some of the actors split from the troupe and formed the children's theatre Theater Rote Grütze to develop a sex education play for children. The premiere of "You don't talk about that!!! A play for sexual education" (Darüber spricht man nicht!!! Ein Spiel zur Sexualerziehung) in 1973 created public uproar. The actors used sexual taboo words and taught "children not to be ashamed of their bodies and their bodily functions." Whereas in West Berlin, the municipal government recommended it for elementary school classes despite harsh criticism from conservatives, "Bavarian teachers were not allowed to attend the play with their children".

=== The name Grips ===
In 1972, the children's theatre's move into the Forum Theatre at Kurfürstendamm triggered a name change, with the troupe choosing the name Grips, a colloquial German term describing one's ability to understand quickly, to symbolise that thinking is fun. Volker Ludwig is quoted as saying, "[Grips is] not to give up, always have faith in that last grain of common sense, and – hardest of all – try and develop some kind of positive outlook." The graphic designer and children's book author Jürgen Spohn designed the matching logo: a black face with a big nose, peeking out from inside a cardboard box bearing the word GRIPS.

=== Move to Hansaviertel ===
In 1974, the theatre moved to its current location at Hansaplatz in the southern part of the Hansaviertel, a post-war modernist housing development. The building was designed by German architects Ernst Zinsser and Hansrudi Plarre as part of the Interbau housing development, constructed for the International Architecture Exhibition in 1957. Before the GRIPS moved in, the venue housed the "Bellevue" cinema. The GRIPS opened first opened at the new location on 30 September 1974. The premises were remodelled in accordance with the vision of the troupe. As it had been at the Forum Theatre, the stage was surrounded by benches, placing the actors in the middle of their audience. To this day, it remains possible to place the audience on all four sides of the stage, although one side is usually used as backdrop. As the stage isn't raised, visitors in the first row are at the same level as the actors. The theatre has a capacity of 360-400 people. The entrance is adorned with a mosaic of caricatures by Rainer Hachfeld. As the building is integrated into the U-Bahn station Hansaplatz, theatregoers can easily reach the GRIPS by public transport.

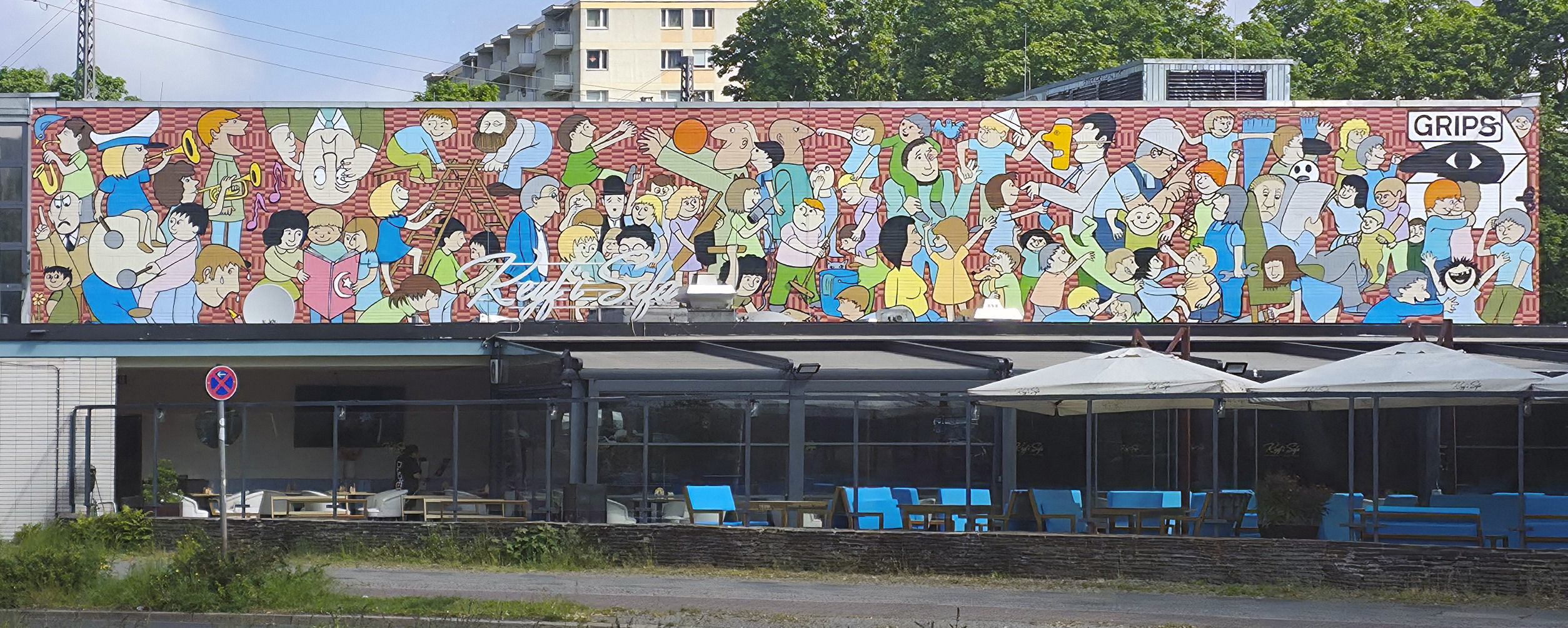
Mosaic of caricatures by Rainer Hachfeld above the entrance of the GRIPS Theatre

=== First plays for youth ===
While the troupe had rather focused on children's plays at first, it subsequently aimed to include problems that teenagers face into its concept. Following the success of "Gosh, Girl!" (Mensch Mädchen!), a children's play about gender roles, the GRIPS premiered its first youth play in the autumn of 1975. Titled "That's incredible!" (Das hältste ja im Kopf nicht aus), it dealt with problems faced by general school students.

=== Anti-GRIPS campaign ===
Although its first youth play earned the troupe its next Brother Grimm Award, 1975 also marked the start of a public political debate about its plays and a smear campaign against their theatre. The Berlin chapter of the Christian Democrat Party, then in opposition, labelled the actors as communists who would corrupt children and claimed that the youth play's "unwholesome language" incited young people to acts of violence. In May 1975, the town councillor for youth in Berlin's Steglitz district, Klaus Dieter Friedrich, banned a guest performance of Mensch Mädchen! not because of the play itself but because "members of the GRIPS Theatre moved in the city's communist circles". Journalists of the powerful Springer publishing house, which controls the largest share of the German market for daily newspapers, also attacked the theatre. The Berliner Morgenpost wrote that GRIPS' plays were rearing "a load of political psychopaths, poor devils who would one day be their own destruction, having destroyed other things on the way". Ludwig recalled the time in an interview with Berlin daily Der Tagesspiegel. "Starting in 1975, the Christian Democrats ran an anti-GRIPS campaign. For three years, they forced its parliamentary group to vote in favour of withholding funds from Grips and not allowing school classes to visit us. At the time, I was labelled Stalinist, Maoist and child abuser. The Springer press wrote I destroyed children's souls. That continued until in 1981, when a Christian Democrat, [Richard von] Weizsäcker, was elected mayor. He was extremely embarrassed by it all. 'Nobody will outshine us in terms of liberality,' he had someone communicate to me. And then the whole spook was over." The attacks had the opposite effect to the intended and helped raise awareness of the GRIPS-Theatre, whose shows were sold out almost every night. In 1981, the GRIPS' youth play "Everything is Plastic" (Alles Plastik) reignited the debate about the theatre as the play, which dealt with the apathy and no-future mentality of teenagers, included references to the struggle of the squatters in Berlin in 1981.

=== Plays for adults ===
In 1980, the GRIPS presented a play for adults. A Story of the Left (Eine linke Geschichte), performed at the GRIPS to this day, deals with three students who meet in 1966 at a rally against the American War in Vietnam. The play follows their political development amidst the German student movement and the German Autumn, a set of terror events in West Germany in late 1977. The play was continuously updated to incorporate more recent historic events, including the German reunification. Since autumn 2007, however, the repertoire reverted to the play's original version.

=== Linie 1 ===
In 1985, Volker Ludwig wrote the musical Line 1 (Linie 1). The title refers to Berlin's subway line U1. The music was written by German musician and composer Birger Heymann, a longtime friend of Ludwig, and the rock band No Ticket (Thomas Keller, George Kranz, Axel Kottmann, Michael Brandt, Richard Wester, Matthias Witting). The musical premiered on 30 April 1986 and became the biggest success of the GRIPS-Theatre.

The story follows a young woman who runs away from her provincial hometown and ends up at Berlin's notorious Zoo station, searching for a rock musician who got her pregnant on a one-night stand. She gets stuck in underground line 1 and encounters a kaleidoscope of urban characters and their fates. According to the GRIPS, "it's a show, a drama, a musical about living and surviving in a large city, hope and adaptation, courage and self-deceit, to laugh and cry at, to dream, and to think about oneself." As its other plays, Linie 1 includes sociocritical elements, but it also serves as an amusing portrait of Berlin's society before the fall of the Berlin Wall.

The success of Linie 1 also had its drawbacks. Due to the production's considerable costs, ticket sales no longer covered the theatre's expenses. However, after Volker Ludwig mentioned on a talk show that the theatre would have to close without additional support, the government eventually increased its subsidies. Initially, Germany's main stages ignored Linie 1, but when the Stuttgart State Theatre successfully ran the musical, other theatres followed suit. Linie 1 became known nationwide after several of its songs were performed on satirical TV show Scheibenwischer (windshield wipers). The show's creator, German satirist, actor and author Dieter Hildebrandt, later had a cameo appearance in the 1988 film version film version of the musical.

For years, Linie 1 was the most-played German production and it remains the second-most successful musical after Bertolt Brecht's Threepenny Opera. In 1987, the musical's author Volker Ludwig was awarded the Mülheimer Dramatikerpreis (English: dramatist award of Mülheim), considered Germany's leading theatre award.

To this day, the musical has been performed at over 150 German-language theatres and adapted by theatres in 15 countries, including Brazil, Canada, Denmark, Finland, Greece, Italy, India, Lithuania, Namibia, the Netherlands, Russia, South Korea, Spain, Sweden and Yemen. In Barcelona ("Linea Roja"), Hong Kong ("Island Line"), Kolkata ("Chord Line"), Seoul ("Seoul Linie 1"), Vilnius ("Rule No. 1: It is forbidden to dream of Vilnius"), Windhoek ("Friends 4Eva") and Aden ("Mak Nazl"), the original play was adapted to the respective cities and retained the original music (expect for Hong Kong).

In Seoul Line 1, a young Chinese Korean woman from Yanbian comes to Seoul, travelling back and forth between the Seoul Station and the Cheongnyangni 588 red light district. The Nazi widows of the original play become widows of former military big shots. This Korean version, adapted by Kim Min-ki, became even more successful than the original in Berlin. While the GRIPS put on its 1,800th performance of Linie 1 in October 2017, Seoul Line 1 was performed over 4,000 times during the 13 years the musical belonged to the Hakchon Theatre's repertoire. After learning about this, members of the GRIPS, translated his song Morning Dew into German, visited South Korea in 2004, and gave it to him as a gift. The title is Morgentau.

In the Namibian version, a German girl arrives in Windhoek searching for a Namibian musician she met while he was playing in Germany. She travels all over Namibia with various typical means of transport, such as minibus taxis and a donkey cart. The Wilmersdorf widows in this version are widows of former Boers still dreaming of white supremacy in Africa.

=== GRIPS today ===
Since 1992, the GRIPS owns a so-called 'studio and rehearsal stage' in addition to the theatre at Altonaer Straße. Until 2009, smaller productions were staged at the Schiller-Theater Werkstatt (workshop), but since then, the GRIPS Podewil at Klosterstraße. Usually, the GRIPS releases at least four new plays and stages 300 performances per year.

When Volker Ludwig left his post as the GRIPS' artistic director at the end of the 2011/2012 season, he appointed Stefan Fischer-Fels as his successor who had previously worked at the Düsseldorfer Schauspielhaus. Due to differences in opinions, Ludwig and Fischer-Fels agreed on a premature termination of the contract in 2015, which saw Fischer-Fels returning to the Düsseldorfer Schauspielhaus. He was succeeded by in-house theatre pedagogue Philipp Harpain. Until the end of the 2016/2017 season, Ludwig remained in his role as the GRIPS' managing director before turning this post over to Harpain, too, on his 80th birthday.

At his departure, author and theatre critic Rüdiger Schaper paid tribute to Ludwig. "Berlin has made several contributions to world theatre. Volker Ludwig and the Grips belong into that category. […] A miracle. What luck to have been able to witness it."

=== Ensemble ===
==== Actors ====
Several of the GRIPS-Theatre's cast have gone on to successful careers in TV and film, including Dieter Landuris, Petra Zieser, Heinz Hoenig, Axel Prahl, Julia Blankenburg, Nadine Warmuth, and Mathias Schlung. Veteran ensemble members Dietrich Lehmann and Thomas Ahrens have been with the GRIPS since 1969 and 1975, respectively. Lehmann accomplished the outstanding achievement of participating in every performance of Line 1 since its premiere in 1986. Since 1981, Lehmann also serves as head of the Fritz Kirchhoff School, the oldest state-recognized private drama school in Berlin.

==== Musician ====
Axel Kottmann, George Kranz and Matthias Witting, who joined the ensemble between 1978 and 1986, formed the band Zeitgeist from 1980 to 1983. In addition, Kranz is a successful solo musician, best known for his song Din Daa Daa (Trommeltanz). In 1986, the year Line 1 premiered, Thomas Keller, Michael Brandt and Richard Wester joined. Together, the six musicians participated in composing and arranging the music of the musical, which they performed as rock band No Ticket. All but Wester are performing at the GRIPS to this day.
