= Morning Dew (Korean song) =

1970s South Korean protest song

Song by Yang Hee-eun

from the album Yang Hee-eun Gounnorae Moeum (Korean: 양희은 고운노래 모음; lit. 'Yang Hee-eun's Collection of Beautiful Songs')
- Released: September 1, 1971
- Genre: T'ong guitar, ballad
- Songwriter: Kim Min-ki
- Producer: Kim Min-ki

"Morning Dew" (Korean: 아침 이슬; RR: Achim iseul) is a South Korean protest song from the 1970s written by Kim Min-ki and sung by Yang Hee-eun. In 1971, the song was Kim Min-ki's debut in his album Minki Kim, but Yang Hee-eun released it a month earlier. It was not intended to be a protest song, and belonged to the geonjeongayo genre. It has also been described as belonging to the genres of Korean ballad and T'ong guitar. The song was well received by both music critics and the public, youths in particular. Initially it won a government award (건전가요상, the Wholesome Song Award), and was considered a pro-government propaganda or "healthy" song, and played on the Korean radio under a cultural program supported by the government.

Soon afterward, it had inexplicably become a popular protest song among the pro-democracy activists in South Korea, particularly with students. Despite the song lacking an overt political message and being described as "full of resolve in spite of the sorrows of life's trials", its wording could be interpreted as "activists yearning for a democratic society", and critical of the 1972 Yushin Constitution. It has also been interpreted as critical of Americanization of Korean society. Also, in the lyrics 'A blazing red sun rising up over the graveyard', the sun is interpreted as Kim Il-sung, and the words rising red can be interpreted to mean communism.

Subsequently, in December 1975, it was banned by government censorship of the Park Chung Hee regime. It was later also banned in North Korea. Copies of the album containing it were recalled and destroyed, and it was even prohibited to cover it. Kim Min-ki's school junior, Lee Soo-man, almost received disciplinary action after singing this song on a night stage in 1978. The song, composed in 1971, was one of the favorites of the pro-democracy students until the late 1980s (the other being another song by Kim Min-ki, 상록수; Sangnoksu; 'Evergreen', 거치른 들판에 푸르른 솔잎처럼; Geochireun deulpane pureureun sollipcheoreom). It was often sung during the events of the 1987 June Democratic Struggle. It has also been described as an anthem of the Korean pro-democracy movement and credited with starting the South Korean protest music.

The ban on the song was lifted following pro-democracy protests in 1987. It remained popular for some time afterward. It has been sung at political rallies as late as the 2000s.

The song has also been described as popular with North Koreans living in Japan (people affiliated with Chongryon).

Kim Min-ki brought the German musical Linie 1 to South Korea and adapted it, which became a huge hit. After learning about this, members of the Grips-Theater, a German original performance team, translated his song into German, visited South Korea in 2004, and gave it to him as a gift. The title is Morgentau.

== See also ==
- South Korean protest music
