= Linie 1 =

German musical

Linie 1 is the second-most successful German musical after Bertolt Brecht’s Threepenny Opera. The title refers to Berlin's subway line U1. The musical was first performed by the ensemble of the GRIPS-Theater on 30 April 1986. In October 2017, the troupe put on its 1,800th performance. The music was written by Birger Heymann, the text written by Volker Ludwig, the set designed by Mathias Fischer-Dieskau, and the musical directed by Wolfgang Kolneder. In 1988, a film version was made, and in 2008, GRIPS released a live recording on DVD.

== Production ==
=== Synopsis ===
The story follows a young woman who runs away from her provincial hometown and ends up at Berlin’s notorious Zoo station, searching for a rock musician who got her pregnant on a one-night stand. She gets stuck in underground line 1 and encounters a kaleidoscope of urban characters and their fates. According to the GRIPS, “it’s a show, a drama, a musical about living and surviving in a large city, hope and adaptation, courage and self-deceit, to laugh and cry at, to dream, and to think about oneself.” As its other plays, Linie 1 includes sociocritical elements, but it also serves as an amusing portrait of Berlin's society before the fall of the Berlin Wall.

=== Development ===
In 1985, Volker Ludwig wrote the musical Line 1 (Linie 1). The title refers to Berlin's subway line U1. The music was written by German musician and composer Birger Heymann, a longtime friend of Ludwig, and the rock band No Ticket (Thomas Keller, George Kranz, Axel Kottmann, Michael Brandt, Richard Wester, Matthias Witting). The musical premiered on 30 April 1986 and became the biggest success of the GRIPS-Theatre.

The success of Linie 1 also had its drawbacks. Due to the production's considerable costs, ticket sales no longer covered the theatre's expenses. However, after Volker Ludwig mentioned on a talk show that the theatre would have to close without additional support, the government eventually increased its subsidies. Initially, Germany's main stages ignored Linie 1, but when the Stuttgart State Theatre successfully ran the musical, other theatres followed suit. Linie 1 became known nationwide after several of its songs were performed on satirical TV show Scheibenwischer (windshield wipers). The show's creator, German satirist, actor and author Dieter Hildebrandt, later had a cameo appearance in the 1988 film version film version of the musical.

For years, Linie 1 was the most-played German production and it remains the second-most successful musical after Bertolt Brecht’s Threepenny Opera. In 1987, the musical’s author Volker Ludwig was awarded the Mülheimer Dramatikerpreis (English: dramatist award of Mülheim), considered Germany’s leading theatre award.

=== International performances and adaptations ===
To this day, the musical has been performed at over 150 German-language theatres and adapted by theatres in 15 countries, including Brazil, Canada, Denmark, Finland, Greece, Italy, India, Lithuania (“Taisyklė nr. 1, arba Sapnuoti Vilnių draudžiama“), Namibia, the Netherlands, Russia, South Korea, Spain, Sweden and Yemen. In Barcelona (“Linea Roja“), Hong Kong (“Island Line“), Kolkata (“Chord Line“), Seoul (“Seoul Linie 1“), Vilnius (“Rule No. 1: It is forbidden to dream of Vilnius”), Windhoek (“Friends 4Eva“) and Aden (“Mak Nazl“), the original play was adapted to the respective cities and retained the original music (except in Hong Kong). The english translation of the musical has been performed in september 1986 at the Dublin Theatre Festival by the original German cast. The Director of dialogue for the English production was Rob Lewis. Grips Theater has performed the work in English in New York, Brisbane, Melbourne, Copenhagen, Stockholm and Goteborg.

In Seoul Line 1, a young Chinese Korean woman from Yanbian comes to Seoul, traveling back and forth between the Seoul Station and the Cheongnyangni 588 red light district. The Nazi widows of the original play become widows of former military big shots. This Korean version, adapted by Kim Min-ki, became even more successful than the original in Berlin. While the GRIPS put on its 1,800th performance of Linie 1 in October 2017, Seoul Line 1 was performed over 4,000 times during the 13 years the musical belonged to the Hakchon Theatre's repertoire. Since September 8, 2018, Hakchon Theatre was staging a new version of the musical. After learning about this, members of the GRIPS, translated his song Morning Dew into German, visited South Korea in 2004, and gave it to him as a gift. The title is Morgentau.

In the Namibian version, a German girl arrives in Windhoek searching for a Namibian musician she met while he was playing in Germany. She travels all over Namibia with various typical means of transport, such as minibus taxis and a donkey cart. The Wilmersdorf widows in this version are widows of former Boers still dreaming of white supremacy in Africa.

== Songs ==
- 6 Uhr 14 Bahnhof Zoo
- Tag ich hasse dich
- Warten
- Du sitzt mir gegenüber
- Komm, komm, komm
- Wenn die Liebe erwacht
- Marias Lied (Du bist schön auch wenn du weinst)/(Hey Du)
- Kontroletti-Tango
- Der Anmacher (Horst)
- Berlin
- Es ist herrlich zu leben
- Linie 1 (Touristen-Song)
- Fahr mal wieder U-Bahn
- Wilmersdorfer Witwen
- In jeder Großstadt bin ich zu Haus
- Unbekanntes Wesen
- Nachruf
- Mut zum Träumen
- Only You
- Bitte halt mich fest

=== Cover versions ===
In 2002, German punk rock band Beatsteaks released a cover version of Marias Lied (Du bist schön auch wenn du weinst), titled Hey Du, on their EP Wohnzimmer (Living Room). The song was also included on the band's 2008 live album Kanonen auf Spatzen (Shoot at sparrows with cannons) and released as single. The accompanying video was nominated in the category "Best National Video" at the Echo Music Prize. In 2009, Berlin rapper Sido also released a single with the title Hey du!, which included the first verse of Marias Lied.
