= A Flower Bookmark =

EP by IU
- Released: May 16, 2014
- Genre: Korean ballad
- Length: 25:24
- Language: Korean
- Label: LOEN; LOEN Tree Label
- Producer: Kim Jin-myeong

IU chronology
Modern Times (2013)	A Flower Bookmark (2014)	Chat-Shire (2015)

Singles from A Flower Bookmark
- 1. "My Old Story" Released: May 16, 2014

Music video
- "My Old Story" on YouTube "The Meaning of You" on YouTube

A Flower Bookmark (Korean: 꽃갈피; RR: Kkotgalpi) is the first cover extended play by South Korean singer-songwriter IU. It is also her fourth Korean-language extended play. The EP was released on May 16, 2014, the singer's birthday, by LOEN Entertainment under its imprint LOEN Tree. Unlike her previous works, A Flower Bookmark features cover versions of nostalgic K-pop songs popularized from 1980s to 1990s.

The EP was successful both commercially and critically. It spawned two hit singles; the lead single "My Old Story" and "The Meaning of You". The former topped Billboard K-pop Hot 100, (Note: The song remained IU's sixth and last number-one hit on the chart, which has been discontinued since its issue date of July 16, 2014.) while the latter was ranked at the top of Gallup Korea's Song of the Year in 2014. (Note: IU herself was entitled "Artist of the Year" in the same survey.) In particular, the latter has gone to sell more than two million digital copies since release, even outselling the album's lead track. The EP also earned IU the Melon Music Award for Artist of the Year, and a nomination for Album of the Year. It was ranked at number three on Billboard's list of Best K-pop Albums of 2014.

== Background and release ==
A Flower Bookmark consists of cover versions of nostalgic K-pop songs popularized from 1980s to 1990s, including "My Old Story" (Jo Deok-bae, 1985), "Flower" (Kim Kwang-seok, 1991), "Pierrot Smiles at Us" (Kim Wan-sun, 1990), "When Love Passes By" (Lee Moon-sae, 1987), "The Meaning of You" (Sanulrim, 1984), "Dreams in Summer Night" (Kim Hyun-sik, 1988), and "Boom Ladi Dadi" (Clon, 1996).

On May 15, a video teaser for A Flower Bookmark was uploaded on LOEN Entertainment's official YouTube channel. The teaser features Kim Wan-sun, the original singer of "Pierrot Smiles at Us" (Korean: 삐에로는 우릴 보고 웃지; RR: Ppieroneun Uril Bogo Utji). The official music video for the title track "My Old Story" (Korean: 나의 옛날 이야기; RR: Naui Yetnal Iyagi), starring actor Choi Woo-shik, was released via YouTube on the same day. The whole album was released on the following day. After the album's release, "My Old Story" reached a perfect all-kill status. A limited LP edition, featuring a bonus track "Eoheoya Dunggidunggi", was available for sale.

== Critical reception ==
Professional ratings
Review scores
Source	Rating
IZM	3.5/5 stars

The album received critical acclaim upon release. The Korea Herald complimented the album for providing "a pleasant, calming respite from the mainstream music of today's times", and praised IU for her reinterpretations: "For every track, IU keeps a careful balance between preserving the song's original sentiments and altering the original with her own color and arrangements." Billboard highlighted the track, "Pierrot Smiles at Us" (Korean: 삐에로는 우릴 보고 웃지), as the "most ambitious tune she tackled" and one that proved her diversity as a singer and called the album a "soothing mix of classic K-pop melodies". Furthermore, A Flower Bookmark was listed at number three on Billboard's Best K-Pop Albums of 2014.

== Commercial performance ==
As of October 2015, the album has sold 53,900 copies in South Korea (Note: Sales for both CD and LP editions are combined.) and 900 in Japan. As of February 2026, the album has sold over 91,935 physical copies with its tracks recording a total of over six million digital downloads.

== Accolades ==
Awards and nominations
Year	Award	Category	Recipient	Result
2014	Melon Music Awards	Album of the Year	A Flower Bookmark	Nominated
2015	Seoul Music Awards	Song of the Year – May	"My Old Story"	Nominated
2015	Golden Disc Awards	Digital Bonsang	"My Old Story"	Nominated

== Track listing ==
A Flower Bookmark – Standard edition
No.	Title	Lyrics	Music	Arrangement	Length
1.	"My Old Story" (나의 옛날 이야기; Naui Yetnal Iyagi)	Jo Deok-bae	Jo Deok-bae	Kim Je-hwi	3:33
2.	"Flower" (꽃; Kkot)	Moon Dae-hyun	Moon Dae-hyun	G. Gorilla	2:59
3.	"Pierrot Smiles at Us" (삐에로는 우릴 보고 웃지; Ppieroneun Uril Bogo Utji)	Lee Seung-ho	Son Mu-hyun	Lee Jong-hoon	3:53
4.	"When Love Passes By" (사랑이 지나가면; Sarang-i Jinagamyeon)	Lee Young-hoon	Lee Young-hoon	G. Gorilla	4:00
5.	"The Meaning of You" (너의 의미; Neoui Euimi, featuring Kim Chang-wan)	Kim Han-young	Kim Chang-wan	Go Tae-young	3:15
6.	"Dreams in Summer Night" (여름밤의 꿈; Yeoreumbamui Kkum)	Yoon Sang	Yoon Sang		3:56
7.	"Boom Ladi Dadi" (꿍따리 샤바라; Kkungddari Shabara, featuring Clon)	Kim Chang-hwan	Kim Chang-hwan	Lee Jong-min	3:48
Total length:					25:24

A Flower Bookmark – Limited edition LP
No.	Title	Lyrics	Music	Arrangement	Length
1.	"My Old Story" (나의 옛날 이야기; Naui Yetnal Iyagi)	Jo Deok-bae	Jo Deok-bae	Kim Je-hwi	3:33
2.	"Flower" (꽃; Kkot)	Moon Dae-hyun	Moon Dae-hyun	G. Gorilla	2:59
3.	"Pierrot Smiles at Us" (삐에로는 우릴 보고 웃지; Ppieroneun Uril Bogo Utji)	Lee Seung-ho	Son Mu-hyun	Lee Jong-hoon	3:53
4.	"When Love Passes By" (사랑이 지나가면; Sarang-i Jinagamyeon)	Lee Young-hoon	Lee Young-hoon	G. Gorilla	4:00
5.	"The Meaning of You" (너의 의미; Neoui Euimi, featuring Kim Chang-wan)	Kim Han-young	Kim Chang-wan	Go Tae-young	3:15
6.	"Dreams in Summer Night" (여름밤의 꿈; Yeoreumbamui Kkum)	Yoon Sang	Yoon Sang		3:56
7.	"Boom Ladi Dadi" (꿍따리 샤바라; Kkungddari Shabara, featuring Clon)	Kim Chang-hwan	Kim Chang-hwan	Lee Jong-min	3:48
8.	"Uhuya Doongi Doongi (LP only) (Note: The song had been used as one of the wholesome songs (Korean: 건전가요; RR: Geonjeongayo) in South Korea. In the past, all of the K-pop albums had to include at least one "wholesome song", as an ode to the nation's (and by extension the dictatorship's) greatness. This practice continued until 1987.)" (어허야 둥기둥기)	Eom Ki-won	Geum Soo-hyun		2:34
Total length:					28:04

== Charts ==
=== Weekly charts ===
Chart (2014)	Peak position
South Korean Albums (Gaon)	2
Japanese Albums (Oricon)	144

=== Monthly charts ===
Chart (2014)	Peak position
South Korean Albums (Gaon)	5

=== Year-end charts ===
Chart (2014)	Position
South Korean Albums (Gaon)	47

=== Weekly charts ===
"My Old Story"
Chart (2014)	Peak position
South Korea (Gaon)	2
South Korea (K-pop Hot 100)	1

=== Year-end charts ===
"My Old Story"
Chart (2014)	Position
South Korea (Gaon)	14

== Use in media ==
- "The Meaning of You" (Korean: 너의 의미; RR: Neoui Euimi) was featured on SK Telecom's corporate advertisement.

== Release history ==
Region	Date	Format	Edition	Label
South Korea	May 16, 2014	CD, digital download		LOEN Tree
Worldwide	May 16, 2014	Digital download		LOEN Tree
South Korea	August 21, 2014	LP	Limited Edition	LOEN Tree

== See also ==
- List of Korea K-Pop Hot 100 number-one singles
