= T'ong guitar =

Form of Korean music developed in the early 1970s

T'ong guitar (or tong guitar) was a form of Korean music developed in the early 1970s. It was heavily influenced by American pop music, and artists in the genre were considered Korean versions of American folk singers, such as Joan Baez and Bob Dylan.

The musical form originally started as a solo singer-songwriter performing with an acoustic guitar. It was allied with student movements of the 1970s in song clubs such as "Maeari" at Seoul National University and in Norae Undong ("Song Movement"), caused the embracing of popular genres by Korean intellectuals. Serious academic inquiries in Korean popular music started in 1984, and continue today. With Korean popular music becoming more wide-spread across the world this style of guitar is being heard by more and more people. This does not limit T'ong guitar to specifically the Korean pop genre as there are hints of it in many different genres of music from rock all the way to contemporary Korean music. Most of these genres that T'ong guitar is used in are heavily influenced by western folk music but specifically the stylistic additions added to the music by the guitar. This was very apparent in the palladü style of music that became a popular dance music in the late 1980s that would normally be introduced with piano, violin, or cello with a solo acoustic guitar. However, in the 1980s, t'ong became a form of soft rock ballad that earned critical scorn, being described as a 'mindless love affair with American culture'. Norae Undong separated from t'ong guitar, becoming a more rock-based genre. With these newer genres T'ong guitar continued to evolve and expand on what it already was. It was a new style to many Korean people that brought in just enough western culture but also keeping the culture and vernacular that they were comfortable with. This bridged the gap between the people of Korea and the western folk music that many people enjoyed all over the world.

== See also ==
- Korean music
- Roots revival
- Norae Undong
