= 1AM (song) =

Single by Taeyang

from the album Rise
- Released: June 10, 2014
- Genre: R&B
- Length: 3:50
- Label: YG
- Songwriter: Teddy Park
- Producers: Teddy Park; Choice 37; Boys Noize

Taeyang singles chronology
"Eyes, Nose, Lips" (2014)	"1AM" (2014)	"Good Boy" (2014)

Music video
- "1AM" on YouTube

"1AM" is a song recorded by South Korean singer Taeyang, and was serviced to radio on June 10, 2014 as the third and last single for his second studio album Rise (2014). It was written by long-time collaborator Teddy Park. The filming of the music video was the first time Taeyang met South Korean actress Min Hyo-rin; the two began a relationship shortly after and wed in 2018.

== Background ==
Lyrically, "1AM" is about the narrator missing his ex-girlfriend late into the night and is described as "melancholy" by Jeff Benjamin from Billboard. The music video features South Korean actress Min Hyo-rin, who plays Taeyang's love interest and would later become his wife. It includes a "sexually-charged bed scene" between the two that drew public attention. Seoul Beats felt the "over hyped" bed scene failed to live up to expectations, though they praised it for being "classy" instead of selling "sex for the sake of selling it."

== Track listing ==
No.	Title	Lyrics	Music	Arrangement	Length
1.	"1AM" (새벽 한시; Saebyeok Hansi)	Teddy	Teddy, Choice 37, Boys Noize	Teddy, Choice 37, Boys Noize	3:11
Total length:					3:11

== Charts and sales ==
=== Weekly charts ===
Weekly chart performance for "1 AM"
Chart (2014)	Peak position
South Korea (Gaon Digital Chart)	11
South Korea (K-pop Hot 100)	12
US World Digital Songs (Billboard)	10

=== Sales ===
Chart	Sales
South Korea (Gaon Download Chart)	372,923
