= Ringa Linga =

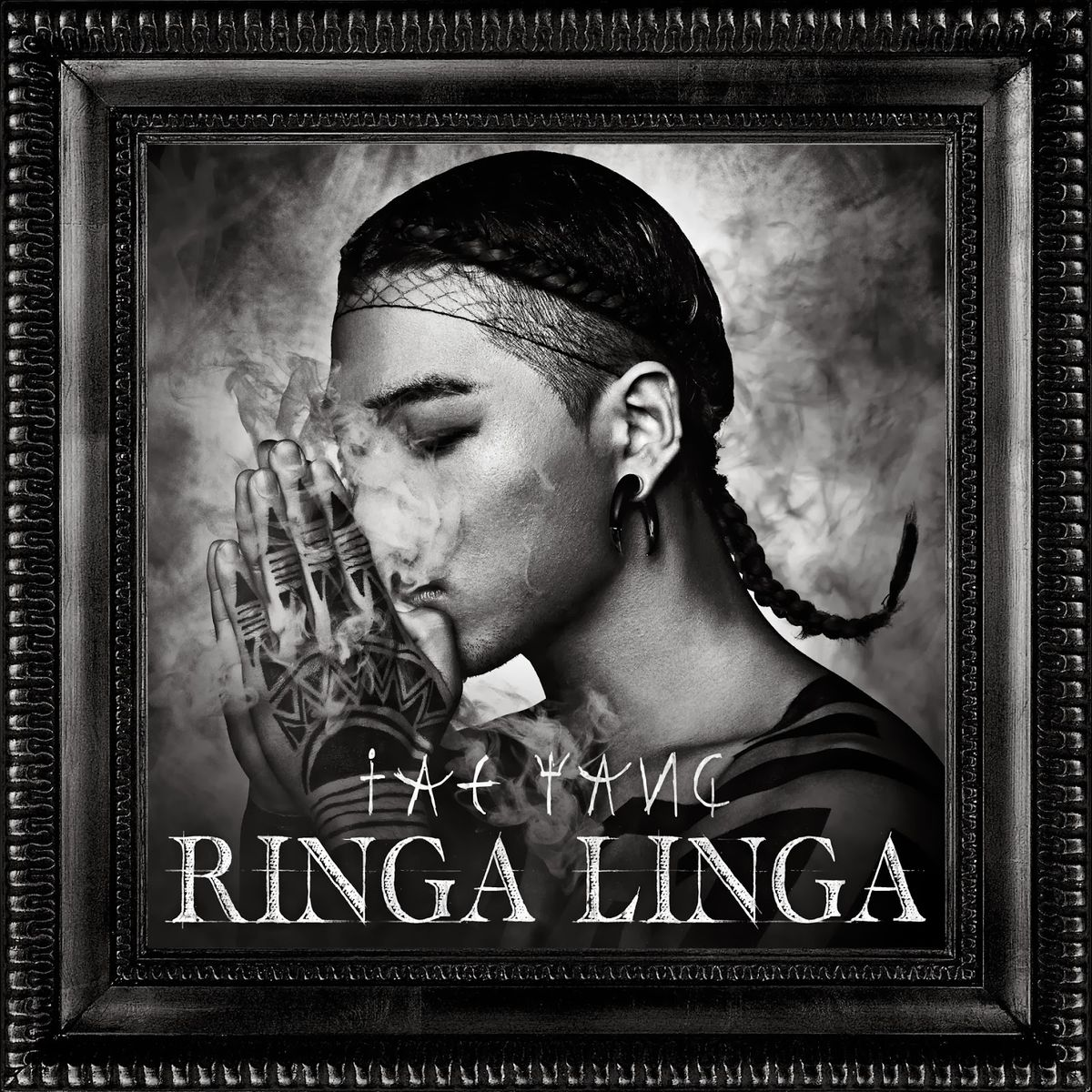

Single by Taeyang

from the album Rise
- Released: November 8, 2013
- Recorded: 2013
- Genre: EDM; hip hop
- Length: 3:47
- Label: YG
- Songwriters: G-Dragon; Ricky "Shockbit" Luna

Taeyang singles chronology
"I'll Be There" (2010)	"Ringa Linga" (2013)	"Eyes, Nose, Lips" (2014)

Music video
- "Ringa Linga" on YouTube

"Ringa Linga" (Korean: 링가 링가) is a song recorded by South Korean singer Taeyang. It was released as a digital single on November 8, 2013, through YG Entertainment. Later, it became the first single to be released from his second studio album Rise (2014). It was written and composed by Big Bang bandmate G-Dragon and Shockbit.

Commercially, "Ringa Linga" peaked at number six on the Gaon Digital Chart and sold more than 700,000 digital units in South Korea. The song also peaked within the top ten on the US World Digital Songs chart and the K-pop Hot 100.

== Composition ==
The song was written by G-Dragon and produced by G-Dragon and Ricky "Shockbit" Luna. "Ringa Linga" is a mix of trap base, dubstep, electronic music and hip hop. The single's refrain is inspired by a Korean children's nursery song called "Round and Round," a song sung while going round and around with hands held, which was previously used in "The Grasshoppers" by Sunny Hill a year prior.

== Reception ==
"Ringa Linga" was chosen by Dazed as the fifth best K-pop song of 2013, with Taylor Glasby commenting that this single shed "the sweet, somewhat hapless guise of his previous singles", writing that Taeyang's "blindingly" confidence made "this unapologetic dancefloor monster" "meth-level addictive." Billboard also ranked at the single number five in their list of best K-Pop songs of the year, describing "Ringa Linga" as a "hard-hitting, club banger" and adding that his "smoky vocals poured over an elaborate production of pumping synths and chest-beating thumps" made the release one of the "most addicting" songs of the year.

Released with only one day left in the tracking week, "Ringa Linga" debuted at number 16 in the Gaon Digital Chart, with 129,876 downloads sold. The following week, the single rose to a peak position of number six, selling additional 151,463 downloads. In the streaming chart, "Ringa Linga" peaked at number eight. During Rise's release week in 2014, "Ringa Linga" re-entered the chart at number 55. By mid-2014, "Ringa Linga" sold over 704,000 digital downloads. On the World Digital Song Sales year-end issue for 2014, "Ringa Linga" was ranked as the 22nd best-selling international/foreign language song in the United States.

== Promotion ==
A dance music video was released on November 7, showing the song choreography and Taeyang's dance that emphasized rhythm. Directed by Jerry Evans, the video featured Taeyang and male dancers dancing through a practice room to a garage and to a hallway continuously. The dance performance video captured in one take.

Two days later the music video was also released, the sets included a warehouse, a place in front of a dilapidated building, a barebones elevator, a pickup truck, supported by a dance crew and bandmate G-Dragon. New Zealand choreographer Parris Goebel choreographed the dance. The music video for the song was directed by Seo Hyun-seung.

The first performance of "Ringa Linga" was held on the music show Inkigayo. Taeyang continued promoting the song on M! Countdown and other Inkigayo stages. He also performed at the 2013 Mnet Asian Music Awards. In December 2013, a collaboration between YG Entertainment and Samsung Music Project released a remix of the song named "Ringa Linga (Shockbit Remix)".

== Accolades ==
Music program awards for "Ringa Linga"
Program	Date	Ref.
Inkigayo	November 24, 2013	

== Charts ==
=== Weekly charts ===
Weekly chart performance for "Ringa Linga"
Chart (2013)	Peak position
Japan (Japan Hot 100)	83
South Korea (Gaon)	6
South Korea (K-pop Hot 100)	9
US World Digital Song Sales (Billboard)	2

=== Year-end charts ===
Year-end performance for "Ringa Linga"
Chart (2014)	Position
US World Digital Songs (Billboard)	22
