= Yang Hee-eun =

South Korean singer

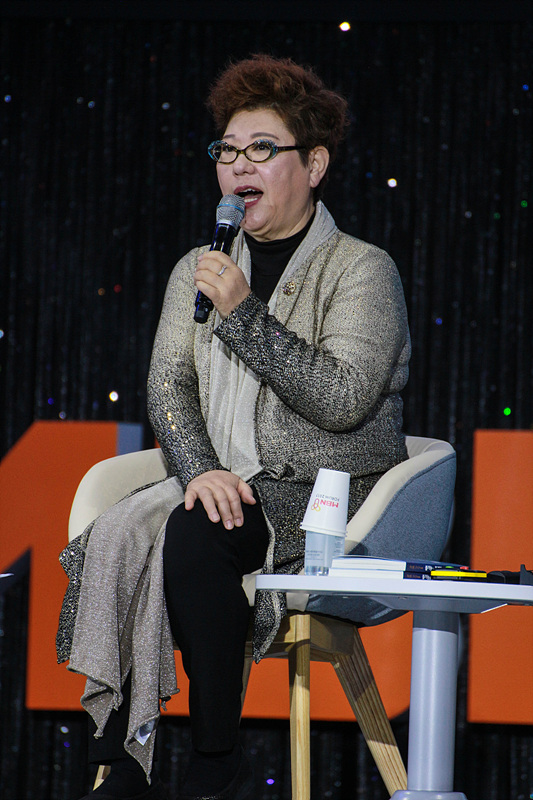
- Yang in 2017

Background information
- Born: August 13, 1952 (age 73); Seoul, South Korea
- Occupations: Singer, songwriter
- Years active: 1971–present

Korean name
- Hangul: 양희은
- Hanja: 楊姬銀
- RR: Yang Huieun
- MR: Yang Hŭiŭn

Yang Hee-eun (Korean: 양희은; Hanja: 楊姬銀; born August 13, 1952) is a South Korean singer and songwriter.

== Life ==
Yang Hee-eun, the eldest of three daughters in Gahoe-dong, Jongno District, Seoul, graduated from Seoul Jae-dong Elementary School, Gyeonggi Girls' Middle School, and Gyeonggi Girls' High School before she graduated from Sogang University's history department. Her father, who graduated from a military and infantry school, participated in the Korean War and died from an illness when she was in the sixth grade of elementary school (1964).

She debuted as a singer in 1971, when she was a freshman in college. Many of her songs were banned from broadcasting at the time because Yang Hee-eun's songs, including "Morning Dew," were sung in the democratization movement through various dictatorships in Korea. Kim Min-ki, the lyricist and composer of the representative song "Morning Dew," said that when he wrote the lyrics at the time, he did not include direct content such as his desire for democratization. However, the people of the time interpreted "Morning Dew" as suitable for democratization due to the situation of the times when the military dictatorship suppressed the desire for democratization, and it became a symbolic protest song of the democratization movement in the '70s and '80s.

In 1981, she left Korea and traveled to the U.S. and Europe for about a year. However, in the following year, 1982, she was diagnosed with ovarian cancer and faced a critical juncture in her life. She had two cancer surgeries and went through many twists and turns in her life, such as fighting the disease. Yang Hee-kyung, her younger sister, looked after her personally and recalled that she really thought her sister was going to die when she could barely groan due to her illness. Although she was unable to have children because of this, she decided to live a positive life by considering her husband and dogs as her children. She is still famous for her voice. Her voice is so powerful and clear that you can recognize it as Yang Hee-eun just by listening to it. However, her younger sister has a very similar voice, so it is easy to confuse them. Of course, Yang Hee-kyung's voice is more gentle, but it is difficult to distinguish between them for relatives and acquaintances if she decides to mimic her. Even their mother has the same voice, so their family and acquaintances are said to be deceived often. Starting with Yoon Jong-shin's work on "Backpack Travel" in 2014, she has been working on producing an album with junior musicians called "Unexpected Meeting". Lee Jeok, Lee Sang-soon, and Sung Si-kyung have been working on nine projects so far and are receiving favorable reviews for successfully attempting new changes.

== Career ==
When she was a teenager, Yang Hee-eun went to "Naughty Boy," a youth shelter run by the YMCA in Seoul, where she met Kim Min-ki, a figure who had a significant influence on her musical career. Without Kim Min-ki, the current Yang Hee-eun would not be here. When she was in college, she became poor because her mother's shop caught fire. Because of this, she had to sing to make a living, and it was Song Chang-sik who asked her to be on stage. Song Chang-sik is said to have taken her to a beer bar in Myeong-dong where he sang and allowed her to work while taking 10 minutes off his performance time. Since then, she began to walk the path of a singer in earnest. Yang Hee-eun's first full-length album, "Yang Hee-eun's Collection of Fine Songs," was released in September 1971, and "Morning Dew" and "Senoya," composed by Kim Min-ki, became the representative songs that Yang Hee-eun is known for. In the meantime, Ha Deok-gyu's "Hangyae-ryeong," released in 1985, was evaluated as an outstanding song. At the time of its release, the music label gave up promoting it because it had too sad a mood, but it received great praise when it was released again in 1990. "Hangyae-ryeong," the last installment of the novel "People in Wonmi-dong," took its title from this song.

After democratization in 1987, Yang's banned songs were all lifted, and she was reevaluated as an outstanding musician. She had a 30th anniversary album and concert in 2002, and performed the musical "Where Have You Come" until mid-August 2011, reflecting on her life to mark her 40th anniversary in 2011.

The first album, "Yang Hee-eun's Fine Song Collection," and the 20th anniversary album, "Yang Hee-eun 1991," were ranked 85th and 80th, respectively, and were selected as two of the top 100 Korean pop albums.

She is legendary not only as a singer but also as a radio DJ. She also has ample broadcasting experience as a DJ of pop music programs at CBS and TBC since she was young. In 1992, she returned to CBS to host "Yang Hee-eun's Information Age," and to SBS to host "I'm Yang Hee-eun, Two Poems' Friend" until 1998.

== Awards and honors ==
Year	Award	Category	Nominated work	Ref.
2003	Golden Disc Awards	Achievement Award	—N/a	
2011	MBC Entertainment Awards	Top Excellence Award - Radio Category	—N/a	
2019	Korean Music Awards	Achievement Award	—N/a	
2019	Korean Popular Culture and Arts Awards	Order of Cultural Merit	—N/a	
2019	2019 MBC Entertainment Awards	Top Excellence Award - Radio Category	Women Era	

== Records ==
=== Regular ===
1971 - Yang Hee-eun's collection of fine songs <Morning Dew / Senoya Senoya>

1972 - Bool Namu

1972 - Yang Hee-eun's fine song collection 2nd album <Beautiful things / On the way to Seoul / Baekgu / Little Pond>

1973 - Yang Hee-eun's 3rd collection of beautiful songs <Unfathomable Love / Country of Happiness>

1974-My love is... <My love is>

1975 - One Person <One Person / When Time Goes>

1976-Yang Hee-eun Best <Following the Hearings>

1978 - Yang Hee Eun <Woman of the Lodge / Parents>

1979-Like a green pine tree in a rough field <Like a green pine tree in a rough field / Rubber band play / Old soldier's song / A thousand miles>

1980 - Yang Hee-eun <Unnamed Girl / Two in the Rain>

1981 - Yang Hee-eun's new song <How much have you come / Everyone has it>

1983 - Yang Hee-eun's new song collection <White Magnolia / Unachievable Love>

1985 - Yang Hee-eun's new song collection <Kang Ha-ryeong / When the berry blossoms bloom / The peak we will climb is>

1988- Yang Hee-eun's new song collection <After Farewell / Forest>

1991 - Yang Hee-eun 1991 <That Year, Winter / Love About That Loneliness / Autumn Morning>

1995-Yang Hee-eun 1995 <Unbelievable song / At the age of 40>

1998-Yang Hee-eun 1998 <Follow those sky clouds / lovers>

1999 - Yang Hee Eun 1, 2 (Best Album)

1999-Yang Hee-eun, three songs of love (best album, remake album) <after love / by my side of love>

2001-30 Years Anniversary <Because I have you / Love, Prayer for you>

Although it is her 30th anniversary album, it is a memorial album for the most memorable listener, Chu Hee-sook, hosted by Yang Hee-eun on the Women's Generation Radio. It seems that Chu Hee-sook, who was unable to properly cope with terminal cancer at the time, felt a great deal of emotion when she saw the letter sent over four days. When she tried to produce her 30th anniversary album as a memorial album, there were voices of concern around her, but it was produced with Yang Hee-eun's strong argument.

2002-30 Live (Yang Hee-eun's 30th Anniversary Live Album) <Seven Daffodils / Love, Prayer for You>

2006-Yang Hee-eun 35 (Yang Hee-eun 35th Anniversary Album) <The Gift of Life / If Only You Were There>

2014 - 2014 Yang Hee-eun <Nayoung's Refrigerator / Thinking of you / The most beautiful words in my life>

=== CCM ===
1976-A hymn and a carol on a quiet night <Lord now there>

1987 - Yang Hee-eun hymn

1999 - hymn to Yang Hee-eun 1999

2007 - song of god

=== Single ===
2014-Unexpected Meeting Project <Backpack Travel (with Yoon Jong-shin), <Vase (with Lee-jeok)>

2015-Unexpected Meeting Project <with Lee Sang-soon>, <Mother to Daughter (with Kim Chang-ki, Kim Gyu-ri)>, <Sadness Now Bye (with bk! of Astro Bits)>

2016-Unexpected Meeting Project <with Kang Seung-won>, <How are you doing these days? We love you so much (with Kim)>

2017-Unexpected meeting project <with AKMU>

2018-Unexpected Meeting Project <Always You (with Sung Si-kyung, Shim Hyun-bo)>

== Program ==
MBC Standard FM <Women's Generation> "Yang Hee-eun, Kim Il-joong" - Host

SBS <Master of Life> - Commentary
