= March for the Beloved =

South Korean protest song

"March For the Beloved" (Korean: 임을 위한 행진곡; Hanja: 임을 爲한 行進曲; RR: Imeul Wihan Haengjingok) is a Korean protest song that was composed in 1981 in honor of Democracy activist Yoon Sang-won and labor activist Park Ki-soon, who were killed during the Gwangju Uprising in 1980. The original author of the lyrics is Paik Ki-wan, and the composer is Kim Jong-ryul.

The song is composed in a minor key, in the style of a military march.

== History ==
In 1981, novelist Hwang Sok-yong, musician Kim Jong-ryul (a student at Chonnam National University) and 15 Noraepae (musical groups that composed minjunggayos) in the Gwangju region jointly created the song. The song was used in a musical called Dispelling- Wedding of Light. The musical was dedicated to the "soul wedding" of Yoon Sang-won (Spokesperson for the civil army during the Gwangju uprising) and labor activist Park Ki-soon. The couple worked together at the Deulbul Night School, a night school that taught labor laws to workers), and were killed during the Gwangju Uprising in 1980. "March for the Beloved" was composed to be used as a chorus for the end of the musical.

The song was written by Kim Jong-ryul at Hwang Seok-young's house in Gwangju in May 1981. The lyrics are based on a long poem called the "Moitbinari-dedicated to the young dancers of the southern lands", which was composed in prison by civic activist Baek Ki-wan in December 1980. At the time, Baek was imprisoned at Seodaemun Detention Center for a 1979 protest at a YMCA in Seoul.

In February 1982, the remains of Yoon Sang-won and Park Ki-soon were transferred to the Mangwol-dong Cemetery in Gwangju (now known as the May 18th National Cemetery).

The song was first released through the musical in 1982, and the song was quickly circulated as a so-called 'minjunggayo' among labor movement forces through cassette tape copies, sheet music transcriptions, and word of mouth, and became a symbolic representative song of the Gwangju Uprising. The song continued to be used among protesters, including during the 1987 June Democratic Struggle.

Since 1997, the song has been performed at the 18 May annual remembrance for the Gwangju Uprising.

== Sheet music ==
The song is composed as a march in the minor key, typical of 1980s protest songs in Korea. Initially it was composed in A minor, but the sheet music in D minor is commonly used.

== Usage and international outreach ==
=== Domestic protests ===
The song is a common protest song in South Korea. It is used in remembrance of the Gwangju Uprising, and is frequently used by labor figures in Korean politics. The song was notably used in protests against presidents Park Geun Hye and Yoon Suk Yeol.

There have been debates within South Korea over whether the song should be sung or chanted, with the South Korean government tending to promote singing over chanting.

=== International usage ===
The song is also circulated abroad through migrant workers who returned to Korea after being dispatched to Korea, and it spread at Labor Movement sites in each country. It has been adapted and sung in the local languages of Hong Kong, People's Republic of China, Taiwan, Cambodia, Thailand, Malaysia, and Myanmar (Burma).

==== Taiwan ====
In 1988, Ke Zhenglong, executive director of Taiwan Taoyuan Airline Labor Union, went to South Korea to exchange labor movement experience, and heard this "March for You" during the factory strike movement in Masan City. After returning to Taiwan, he took the car of Zheng Cunqi, a well-known Taiwanese labor activist who was an advisor to the Taoqin trade union at that time, to Shitou Mountain in Hsinchu City to participate in training related to autumn fighting. He mentioned this song to Zheng Cunqi, which impressed him deeply. Under the suggestion of the other party, Ke Zhenglong wrote down the melody from memory, and composed the Chinese version of "Battle Hymn of Laborers ": 130 with Jiang Jintai, a trade union member, and taught them to the trade union members. It was sung in various Taiwanese labor movements. The "Battle Hymn of Laborers - Song of Gwangju, South Korea" included in the 2008 album "Black Hand Ginseng" by the Black Hand Nakashi Workers Band sings "Battle Hymn of Laborers" written by Ke Zhenglong and Jiang Jintai in Chinese and Korean, and the original version "Dedicated to Your March" also greatly promoted this song in Taiwan. Occupy Taipei Movement in response to Occupy Wall Street in 2011, Hualong Self-Help Association parade in 2014, EVA Air flight attendant strike in 2019 As well as Taiwan's May 1st Labor Day parade and many other movements over the years, demonstrators sang the "Battle Hymn of Laborers" in chorus. Taiwan's Hsinchu Female Workers Choir also wrote lyrics and sang another version of " Taiwan Laborers' Battle Hymn ".

==== Hong Kong ====
In 1981, the Hong Kong Student Christian Movement (SCMHK), which had been inactive for a period of time, was reorganized and established a close cooperative relationship with Korean youth Christian organizations such as the Korean Christian Student Federation (KSCF) . The two organizations, both of which belong to the World Christian Students Union, collaborated in organizing youth meetings in the 1980s. At this time, South Korea was still in the era of Chun Doo-hwan's rule, and the Korean Federation of Christian Student Unions was a staunch supporter of the democratization movement, and they often sang "March for You" in gatherings with Hong Kong youths. In 1984, Huang Huizhen, a member of SCMHK who was studying at the Divinity School of Chung Chi College, The Chinese University of Hong Kong, was working as a trainee in the Hong Kong Christian Labor Organization. She translated this song into the Cantonese version of "Love's Battle" for labor gatherings. The title is the literal translation of the original song's English name "March for Love".

Around 1993, Hong Kong grassroots singer Billy (real name Kong Fanqiang) learned the song from a friend he met during the movement, and got the score handwritten by Huang Huizhen in 1984, but he thinks the lyrics of this version are out of tune and difficult to sing in Cantonese. In 1998, Billy formed the social movement band Noise Cooperative and heard Taiwan's "Battle Hymn of Labor". The following year, the Noise Cooperative rewrote and sang a new Cantonese version while retaining the title of "Love 's Battle".

In 2005, during the anti-WTO parade launched by South Korean farmers in Hong Kong, some Hong Kong citizens sang this song to express their support for the South Korean peasant demonstrators. In addition, labor movements such as the May Day parade in Hong Kong in 2015 and the Hoi Lai Village cleaners' strike in 2017, as well as the Occupy Central movement in 2014 all featured this song.

On September 27, 2017, to commemorate the third anniversary of the official start of the Occupy Central movement on September 28, 2014, Hong Kong social activist and singer Jin Peiwei re-wrote the lyrics and sang the Cantonese version of "Umbrella March" and uploaded it to her YouTube channel.

During the anti-extradition bill movement that broke out in 2019, Jin Peiwei and other demonstrators publicly sang this version of the song many times.

==== Mainland China ====
In the 2007 album "Singing for the Laborers", the Workers' Band Migrant Youth Art Troupe in Mainland China sang "March Dedicated to You" into a Chinese version of "Ode to Laborers ", and the lyricist was Sun Heng, a member of the band. As musicians who are also enthusiastic about the labor movement, the Migrant Youth Art Troupe maintains a good relationship with Taiwan's black hand Nakashi Workers Band and Hong Kong's Noise Cooperative, and it was Billy of the Noise Cooperative who encouraged them to contribute to this song Created the mainland version. From 2012 to 2018, the non-governmental organization Beijing Workers' Home, founded by Sun Heng, held the "Migrant Workers' Spring Festival Gala" for migrant workers in Pi Village, Jinzhan Township, Chaoyang District, Beijing, and sang this song "Ode to Laborers" every year. However, because the lyrics of "Hymn to Laborers" focus on praising "laborers are the most glorious", they did not highlight the spirit of resistance in the original version and other versions, which caused some controversy .

==== Thailand ====
The Thai version is called "Unity" or "Solidarity" (Thai: โซลิดาริตี้), which was sung by Paradon (Thai: ภราดร ), a Thai female labor band founded in 1993. It was sung during the 2006 demonstrations against the Thailand-U.S. Free Trade Agreement.

== See also ==
- Progressivism in South Korea
- Minjung
