= Kim Min-ki =

South Korean musician (1951–2024)

Kim Min-ki 김민기
- Born: March 31, 1951; Iri, North Jeolla Province, South Korea
- Died: July 21, 2024 (aged 73) Seoul, South Korea
- Genre: Folk rock
- Occupations: Singer; composer; playwright
- Awards: Eungwan Order of Cultural Merit (2018)

Korean name
- Hangul: 김민기
- Hanja: 金敏基
- RR: Gim Mingi
- MR: Kim Min'gi

Kim Min-ki (Korean: 김민기; March 31, 1951 – July 21, 2024) was a South Korean singer, composer, and playwright. He was best known for his 1970 song, "Morning Dew," and for his 1994 Korean adaptation of the German musical, Linie 1.

== Early life and education ==
Kim was born on March 31, 1951, the youngest of 10 children, in Iri (present-day Iksan), North Jeolla Provence, South Korea. His family moved to Seoul in 1963, and he enrolled in Seoul National University to study fine arts in 1969.

== Career ==
Kim first came to prominence as the composer of the tune "Achim Isul" (Korean: "아침 이슬", literally "Morning dew"), which was written in 1970 and performed by Korean folk singer Yang Hee-eun. The song was a major pop music hit in Korea in the 70s, and Kim became a prominent figure in blending Korean folk and pop musics, as well as an outspoken political activist and representative of youth culture. Kim's songs discussed the Americanization of Korean culture and questioned relations between North and South Korea, and his lyrical and musical style were a major influence on the genre known as Norae Undong ("Song Movement") which became popular in the 1980s. Sangnoksu (상록수, Sangnoksu, 거치른 들판에 푸르른 솔잎처럼, Geochireun deulpane pureureun soripcheoreom, lit. Evergreen) composed in 1979, was one of the favorites of the pro-democracy students until the late 1980s.

He released nine albums before 1975, at which time his music was censored by the government; his albums were pulled from record stores, playing of his music over the radio or singing it in public was banned, and he was not permitted to release material under his own name. He composed the music for a 1981 film, A Small Ball Shot by a Midget, which was not permitted to be used by government censors who reviewed the film. This moratorium continued until June 26, 1987, when all restrictions on the performance of his material were lifted.

During his period of censorship, Kim turned to writing plays, which began to be performed after 1987. He also formed an acting troupe, Hakchon, which performs musicals he composed. His adaption of the German rock musical Linie 1 was first performed in 1994 and has been given over 1,000 times in Korea, as well as being performed in China and Japan. In 2007 he received the Goethe Medal.

== Death ==
Kim died from stomach cancer in Seoul, on July 21, 2024, at the age of 73.

== Awards ==
Year	Award-giving body	Category	Nominated work	Ref.
2001	Baeksang Arts Awards	Grand Prize in Theater	Blood Brothers (의형제)	
2007	Goethe-Institut	Goethe Medal	—N/a	
2013	Korean Music Awards	Lifetime Achievement Award	—N/a	
2018	Korean Popular Culture and Arts Awards	Order of Cultural Merit	—N/a	
