= Rise (Taeyang album) =

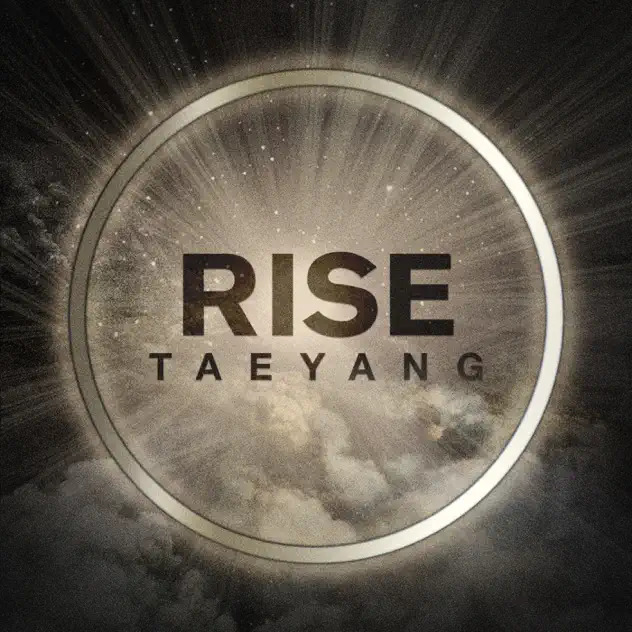
- Digital cover

Studio album by Taeyang
- Released: June 3, 2014
- Recorded: 2011–2014
- Studio: YG (Seoul)
- Genres: EDM; R&B; hip hop; pop
- Length: 30:54
- Language: Korean
- Label: YG
- Producers: Taeyang; Teddy; Choice37

Taeyang chronology
Solar (2010)	Rise (2014)	White Night (2017)

Singles from Rise
- 1. "Ringa Linga" Released: November 8, 2013; 2. "Eyes, Nose, Lips" Released: June 3, 2014; 3. "1AM" Released: June 10, 2014

Rise is the second studio album by South Korean recording artist Taeyang, member of the boy group Big Bang. It is his first album in four years since Solar in 2010. Rise became the third highest charting K-pop album, and also the highest charting K-pop album by a Korean soloist on the Billboard 200 chart by debuting at number 112, number one on the Billboard World Albums Chart, number one on Heatseekers Albums Chart. The album also debuted at number one on the Gaon Album Chart. A Japanese edition of Rise was packaged as part of Taeyang's Japanese debut album, Rise + Solar & Hot, on August 13, 2014.

== Background and composition ==
"Ringa Linga" was the first single for the album, released in November 2013. The track is a hip-hop and EDM song with rhythmic rapping. The album, however, was only released six months after this single with a more R&B sound, with Taeyang saying there was a change in concept during the recording sections because his label, YG, wasn't satisfied with the tracks he was working on.

Taeyang worked with Choice37 and Teddy Park, who had helped with his previous album. He also sought help from Ricky "Shockbit" Luna, The Fliptones, JHart and other noticeable producers, including Boys Noize and Peejay. Both of them had contributed to BigBang albums before. Bandmate G-Dragon also contributed. This album marked the first collaboration between him and Airplay, Jo Sung Hwak, Happy Perez, Britt Burton and other uncredited producers and musicians. Although most tracks are R&B, "Body" is an "old-school disco" with "heavy electronic and digital vibe to it" while "This Ain' It" is reminiscent of British pop, "Let Go" of gospel music and "Intro (Rise)" includes tropical elements.

== Release ==
The album was digitally released on June 3, consisting of 9 songs and was released worldwide through iTunes, Melon and other online music portals. The physical album hit stores on June 10. There are two different versions of the album. The regular album contains a booklet (48p), CD, one poster, and one sticker. The limited edition features a booklet (128p), CD, two posters, and three photo cards. In Japan, Rise was included as part of Taeyang's Japanese debut album titled Rise + Solar & Hot, which was released through YGEX on August 13, 2014. The compilation album contained songs from the singer's first EP Hot (2008) and first studio album Solar (2010).

== Promotion ==
On May 25, YG Entertainment revealed the first teaser picture. On the next day, the second teaser photo was unveiled, followed by a video teaser. The tracklist was revealed on May 28. Ahead of the online release of his new album, Taeyang held a private event, called "Rise:Premiere" in Gangnam with invited reporters and selected fans. There, the new songs and music videos were revealed for the first time.

Taeyang performed "1AM" on several stages during late 2013 including SBS Gayo Daejun. Taeyang's first stage comeback was on Inkigayo on June 6, 2014. G-Dragon joined him for "Stay With Me" and Taeyang continued to perform alone the title track "Eyes, Nose, Lips." His second comeback stage which was on M! Countdown, where he sang "1AM" and "Eyes, Nose, Lips". He also performed "Eyes, Nose, Lips" and "Ringa Linga" at the talk show You Hee-yeol's Sketchbook. Taeyang met with fans at the Gangnam's JBK Hall for 1theK’s "Wonder Live" show, where he performed "Body" and "Love You to Death" for the first time. On June 27, Taeyang held an unofficial hug event in U-Plex in Shinchon, inviting 200 fans to thank them for showing support for Rise.

On June 15, YG Entertainment announced a "cover project" in which its artists will be covering songs from others. Akdong Musician were the first to release a cover of "Eyes, Nose, Lips." Tablo covered the song with a rap version and Taeyang appeared during its bridge part. Lydia Paek was the third YG Family artist to cover the song for the project.

== Critical reception ==
Fred Thomas from AllMusic said that the album employs "the same K-Pop ear candy production and radio-friendly beats that made both his solo debut and his work in Big Bang so catchy and bright." Jeff Benjamin and Tina Xu from Fuse called Rise "excellent" and highlighted the track "Love You to Death," calling it "stunning." Billboard ranked Rise the sixth best K-Pop album of 2014, claiming the record "is the shining example of how to make a good R&B album today." The radio station 923amp also included Rise in their best K-Pop albums of the year list. While including the record in a list of K-Pop albums for "people who don't like K-Pop," Tamar Herman from Paste said that "Taeyang's crisp, swoon-invoking vocals and the outstanding composition of the songs on Rise will make even the most discerning music listener take a moment or two to stop and abandon previous misconceptions about K-pop."

=== Accolades ===
Awards and nominations for Rise
Year	Ceremony	Award	Result	Ref.
2014	Gaon Chart Music Awards	Album of the Year (2nd Quarter)	Nominated	
2014	MBN Awards	Best Album	Won	
2014	Melon Music Awards	Album of the Year	Nominated	
2015	Red Dot Design Awards	Communication Design	Won	
2016	iF Design Awards	Album Design	Won	

== Track listing ==
No.	Title	Lyrics	Music	Arrangement	Length
1.	"Intro (Rise)"	Tablo; Choice 37	Peejay; Taeyang	Peejay	1:45
2.	"Eyes, Nose, Lips" (눈, 코, 입; Nun, Ko, Ip)	Teddy; Taeyang	Teddy; Dee.P; P.K; Bekuh BOOM	Teddy; Dee.P	3:50
3.	"1AM" (새벽 한시; Saebyeok Hansi)	Teddy	Teddy; Choice 37; Boys Noize	Teddy; Choice 37; Boys Noize	3:11
4.	"Stay With Me" (feat. G-Dragon)	G-Dragon	G-Dragon; The Fliptones; JHart	The Fliptones	3:22
5.	"Body" (아름다워; Areumdawo)	Teddy; Taeyang	Teddy; Taeyang; P.K; Dee.P	Teddy; P.K; Dee.P	3:10
6.	"Ringa Linga" (링가링가; Ling-ga Ling-ga)	G-Dragon	G-Dragon; Shockbit	Shockbit	3:47
7.	"This Ain't It" (이게 아닌데; Ige Aninde)	Airplay; iHwak	Airplay; iHwak	Airplay	4:23
8.	"Let Go" (버리고; Beorigo)	Tablo	P.K; Taeyang; Dee.P	P.K; Dee.P	3:40
9.	"Love You to Death"	Tablo; Britt Burton; Kang Hye-jung	Happy Perez; Britt Burton; Taeyang	Happy Perez	3:41
Total length:					30:54

Notes

- "Intro (Rise)" contains samples of "Everybody Wants to Rule the World" by Tears for Fears
- "Body" and "Love You to Death" contain uncredited vocals from 2NE1's CL.
- The female lyrics for "Love You to Death" were written by Kang Hye-jung

== Charts ==
=== Weekly charts ===
Weekly chart performance for Rise
Chart (2014)	Peak position
French Download Albums (SNEP)	55
Japanese Albums (Oricon)	2
South Korean Albums (Gaon)	1
UK Indie Album Breakers (OCC)	19
US Billboard 200	112
US World Albums (Billboard)	1
US Heatseekers Albums (Billboard)	1

=== Monthly charts ===
Monthly chart performance for Rise
Chart (2014)	Peak position
South Korean Albums (Gaon)	2

=== Year-end charts ===
Year-end charts for Rise
Chart (2014)	Position
South Korean Albums (Gaon)	38

== Sales ==
Region	Sales amount
South Korea	64,586
United States	3,000
