= South Korean protest music =

Pro-democracy music

South Korean protest music or Minjung-Gayo (Hangul: 민중가요; Hanja: 民衆歌謠) is a form of modern protest singing culture in South Korea. It has been used as a musical means of supporting the Korean pro-democracy movement. It is mainly enjoyed by people who were critical of mainstream song culture during the democratization movement. The term "minjung-gayo" was coined in the mid-1980s when protest movements were rapidly growing in Korea, and to differentiate the minjung-gayo from popular songs. The minjung-gayo specifically includes the anti-Japanese songs from the Japanese colonial era, which continued until the early 1970s, and generally refers to the culture that began to mature in the late 1970s and which lasted until 1990.

== The concept ==
The 4th 'Gather! Rage! Resign Park Geun-hye Park Geun-hye' demonstration in 2016

According to scholar Byung-soon Kim, the minjung-gayo reflects the will of the crowd and voices the criticism of the day. Korean protest songs emerged in the 1980s, especially before and after the June democracy movement in 1987. They were particularly common in the 1970s and 1980s, against the military governments of Presidents Park Jeong-hee (Korean: 박정희) and Jeon Doo-Hwan (Korean: 전두환).

== Before the 1980s ==
Korean protest songs accompanied the Korean students' movement around 1970. The subject matter of these early songs heavily criticized pop music or had a theme of overcoming hardship. Thus, Korean students started their own unique music culture, distinct from pop culture.

Some of the early songs were called 'Demo-gas' (demonstration songs) and others were called minjung-gayo (Korean protest songs). There were also 'Haebang-ga' (Hangul: 해방가), 'Tana-Tana' and 'Barami-bunda' (Hanguel: 바람이 분다), to name a few. After 1975, 'Hula-song' and 'Jungui-ga' were added to the list.

In the era of emergency, Korean universities became more rigid. Students who participated in the movement had to risk their lives to do so and thus had a stronger faith. These students began to criticize the old social system, starting a progressive political culture. The unique criticism by university students during this time period established the base of Korean protest songs.

== During the 1980s ==
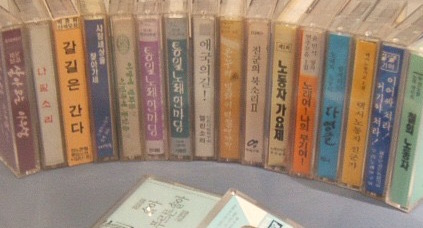
Tapes of Korean protest songs in the 1980s

The short "Spring of Democracy" in 1979, which came after the assassination of Park Chung-hee (or the "10.26 situation") was a chance for student movements to display the minjung-gayo in public demonstrations. Organizers of demonstrations would distribute flyers with the lyrics and minjung-gayo sheet music to attendees. The songs caught on as a part of protest culture.

The history of Korean protest songs in the 1980s can be divided into three periods. The first period was the protest songs, or the period when many songs were composed as marching songs. The March For the Beloved (Hangul: 임을 위한 행진곡) was written, and the number of minjung-gayo skyrocketed between 1980 and 1984.

The second period started with young men, which were fresh out of college, who had been members of music clubs. These men performed a concert inspired by the story told in the song Eggplant Flower (Hangul: 가지꽃) in the Aeogae theater, by lending the name of the theater Handurae (Hangul: 한두레). In this period, the social movement had become even more musical.

The third period is after the democratic uprising in June 1987. The first regular performance of 'People-seeking music' was held in Korean churches for the 100th anniversary memorial in October 1987, after the great labor conflict in mid-to-late 1987. In this period, people had recognized the limits of the universities' minjung-gayo movement and were trying to figure out how they could overcome and surpass them. After the great labor conflict in July to September 1987, minjung-gayo reflected workers' joys and sorrows. After going through this period, protest songs include and embrace not only intellectuals, but also the working-class population.

== During and after the 1990s ==
From the mid-1990s, and possibly due to the decrease in the social voice of student demonstrations and labor demonstrations, the Korean protest songs lost their popularity in many other fields (except the struggle scenes). In this period, the music groups in universities and the professional cultural demonstration groups started trying to change the form of Korean protest songs by trying new things, but it was not easy to change such a generalized form of music into a new wave.

In the 2000s, participatory demonstration culture started settling. In this period, the songs, not having such solemn atmosphere like 'Fucking USA' and 'The First Korean Constitution' were made, but their influence did not spread beyond the field.

== Representative artists ==
=== Kim Min-Ki ===
Born in Iksan-si, Jeollabuk-do and dead at 21th. July. 2024 in Goyang. Gyeongi-do. Kim Min-Ki moved to Seoul before he entered primary school. When he was at Seoul National University, he started writing music and formed the group 'Doobidoo'. At that time, he met Helen Yang, his primary school friend, and wrote her a song named 'Morning dew' (Hangul: 아침 이슬), released in 1970. In 1972, he was arrested for singing songs such as 'We will win' (Hangul: 우리 승리하리라), 'Freedom Song' (Hangul: 해방가), 'The Child Blowing Flowers' (Hangul: 꽃피우는 아이), with all of his songs prevented from being broadcast by Korean government. After he left the Korean army, he wrote Hee Eun Yang's song 'Like the Pine Needles in Wild Grassland' (Hangul:거치른 들판의 푸르른 솔잎처럼) and also 'The Light in the Factory' (Hangul: 공장의 불빛).

=== People Who Are Finding Songs ===
People Who Are Finding Songs (Hangul: 노래를 찾는 사람들) is a music group that wrote Korean protest songs in the 1980s-1990s, known as nochatsa (Hangul:노찾사). As Korean protest songs were not written for commercial success, they presented a more accurate depiction of contemporary political demonstrations against the Korean dictatorship than pop music. The group's albums were commercially successful and have made a strong impact in Korean pop music history. Their group consisted of Meari from Seoul University, Norea-erl from Korea University, Hansori from Ewha Womans University, Sori-sarang from Sungkyunkwan University, and others participated in the group.
