= 2014 Melon Music Awards =

2014 South Korean music award ceremony

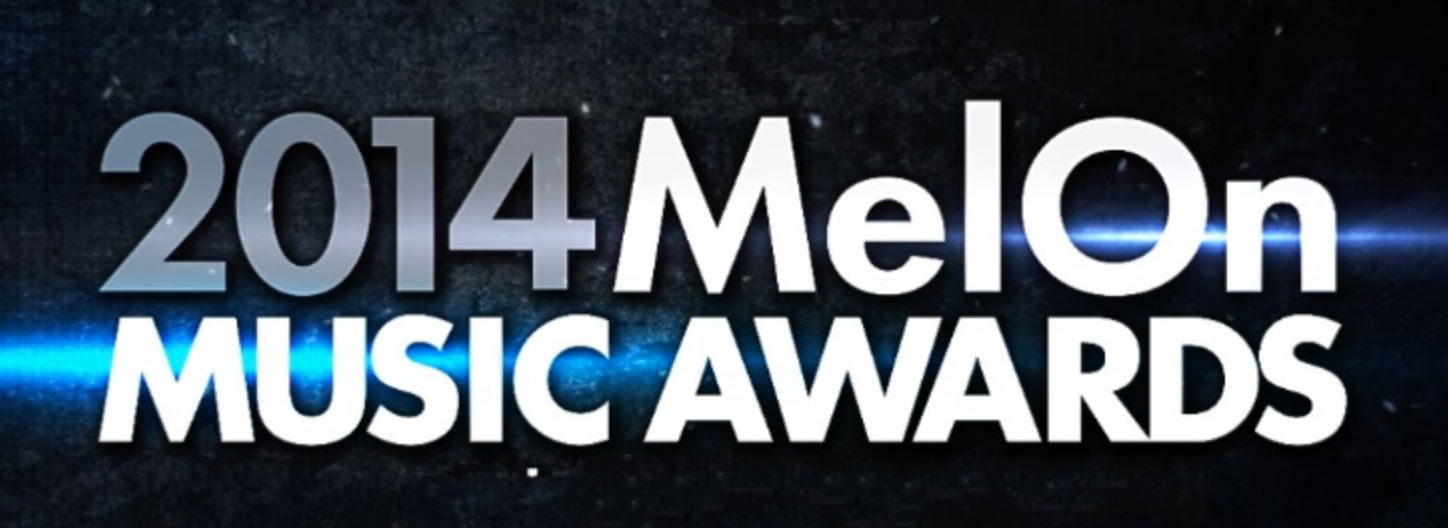
- Date: Thursday, November 13, 2014
- Location: Olympic Gymnastics Arena, Seoul, South Korea

Highlights
- Most awards: Taeyang, IU, 2NE1, AKMU, Beast (2)
- Most nominations: IU (6)
- Song of the Year: "Eyes, Nose, Lips"
- Album of the Year: Chapter 8
- Artist of the Year: IU
- Website: www.melon.com/mma/index.htm

Television/radio coverage
- Network: JTBC2; JTBC4; 1theK; KakaoTV; Daum; Melon

The 2014 Melon Music Awards were held on Thursday, November 13, 2014, at the Olympic Gymnastics Arena in Seoul, South Korea. Organized by Kakao M through its online music store Melon, the 2014 ceremony was the sixth installment of the event. The red carpet event was hosted by Park Eun-ji and Takuya Terada.

== Performers ==
List of performances at 2014 Melon Music Awards
Artist(s)	Song(s)
IU	"My Old Story" / "Meaning of You"
Soyou & Junggigo	"Some"
Apink	"Mr. Chu"
San E & Raina	"A Midsummer Night's Sweetness"
Girl's Day	"Something"
MC the Max	"Wind That Blows"
Winner	"Serenade" / "Don't Flirt" / "Different" / "Tonight" / "I'm Him" / "Empty"
Block B	"Very Good" / "Her"
Sistar	"Touch My Body"
AKMU	"Give Love" / "200%"
Beast	"12:30" / "Good Luck"
Taeyang	"Body" / "Eyes, Nose, Lips"
Lee Guk-joo	"Catallena" / "Mr. Chu" / "Miniskirt" / "Something" (Dance covers)

== Winners and nominees ==
=== Main awards ===
Winners and nominees are listed below. Winners are listed first and emphasized in bold.

Top 10 Artists (Bonsang)	Album of the Year (Daesang)
**2NE1**; **Exo**; **g.o.d**; **Winner**; **Girl's Day**; **Beast**; **Sistar**; **IU**; **AKMU**; **Taeyang**	**g.o.d – Chapter 8**; 2NE1 – Crush; IU – A Flower Bookmark; AKMU – Play; Taeyang – Rise
Artist of the Year (Daesang)	Song of the Year (Daesang)
**IU**; g.o.d; Beast; AKMU; Taeyang	**Taeyang – "Eyes, Nose, Lips"**; IU – "Friday" ft. Jang Yi-jeong; Soyou & Junggigo – "Some"; Park Hyo-shin – "Wild Flower"; San E & Raina – "A Midsummer Night's Honey"
Best New Artist	Best Dance Award
**Winner**; Red Velvet; Mamamoo; Park Bo-ram; Eddy Kim	**Block B – "Her"**; **Apink – "Mr. Chu"**; Infinite – "Back"; B1A4 – "Lonely"; AOA – "Miniskirt"
Best Rap/Hip Hop Award	Best Indie Award
**San E & Raina – "A Midsummer Night's Sweetness"**; Gary & Choi Jung-in – "Your Scent"; Loco ft. Crush – "Hold Me Tight"; Beenzino – "How Do I Look?"; Mad Clown – "Without You"	**Standing Egg – "Lean on Me" (ft. Park Se-young)**; Yozoh – "Day Dream"; Jung Jun-il – "Confession"; Vanilla Acoustic – "Maybe Once You Were First"; Acourve – "The Lovely Song When We Parted"
Best Rock Award	Best Electronic Award
**CNBLUE – "Can't Stop"**; Nell – "Four Times Around The Sun"; Jang Beom-june – "Difficult Woman"; MC the Max – "Wind That Blows"; Hong Dae-kwang	**2NE1 – "Come Back Home"**; Clazziquai – "Love Satellite"; House Rulez – "Melody Day"; Humming Urban Stereo – "Scully Doesn't Know"; Lee Jung – "Your Love"
Best Ballad Award	Best OST Award
**MC the Max – "Wind That Blows"**; Park Hyo-shin – "Wild Flower"; IU – "Friday"; Ailee – "Singing Got Better"; High4 ft. IU – "Not Spring, Love, or Cherry Blossoms"	**Lyn – "My Destiny" (My Love from the Star)**; Davichi – "It's Okay It's Love" (It's Okay, That's Love); Jung Woo, Yoo Yeon-suk, Son Ho-jun – "You Only Feel" (Reply 1994); Jung Eun-ji – "It's You" (Three Days); San E – "What's Wrong With Me?" (You're All Surrounded)
Best R&B / Soul Award	Best Folk Award
**Fly to the Sky – "You You You"**; Taeyang – "Eyes, Nose, Lips"; Soyou & Junggigo – "Some"; 2NE1 – "If I Were You"; Junggigo – "Want U"	**AKMU – "200%"**; Roy Kim – "Home"; Eddy Kim – "The Manual"; Yoo Seung-woo – "Because Night Is So Precious"; Kwon Jin-ah – "See Through"
Netizen Popularity Award	Hot Trend Award
**Beast**; TVXQ; Exo; Infinite; Winner; Park Hyo-shin; B1A4; Huh Gak & Zia	**Soyou & Junggigo – "Some"**; Choi Jung-in & Gary – "Your Scent"; High4 ft. IU – "Not Spring, Love, or Cherry Blossoms"; San E & Raina – "A Midsummer Night's Sweetness"; Seo In-guk & Zia – "Loved You"

=== Other awards ===
Nominees	Winners
Music Video Award	Won Tae-yeon – Melody Day's "Another Parting"
MBC Music Star Award	Ladies' Code
Songwriter Award	Kim Do-hoon

== Gallery ==
2014 Melon Music Awards gallery
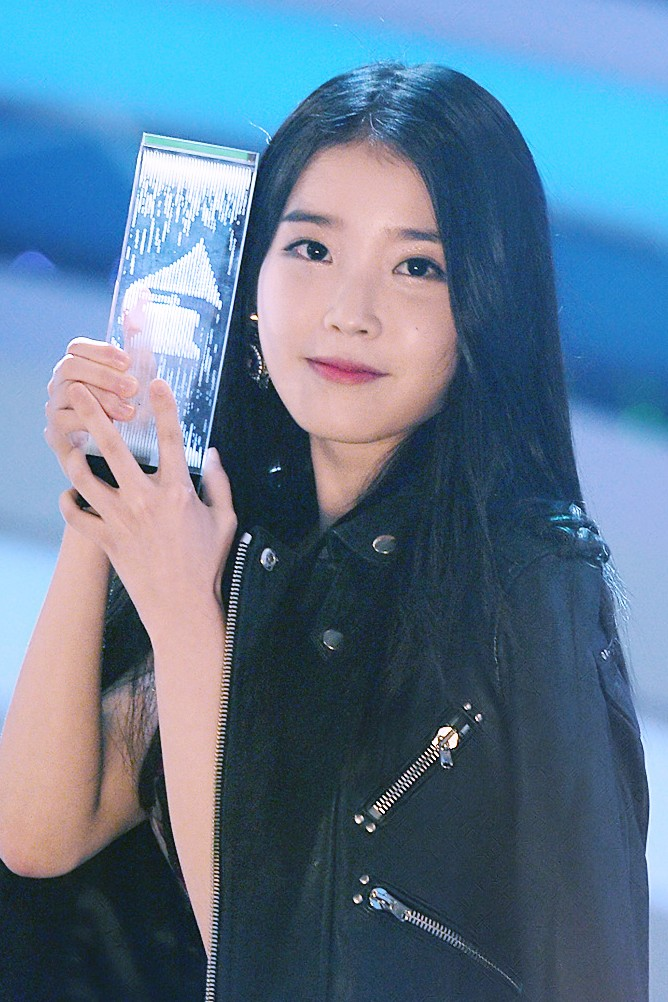
IU, Artist of the Year & Top 10 Artists

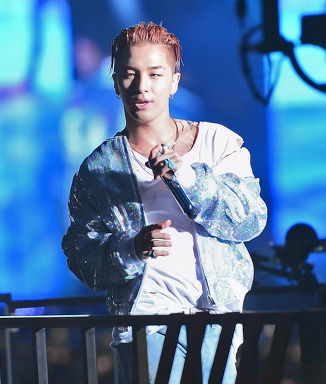
Taeyang, Song of the Year & Top 10 Artists

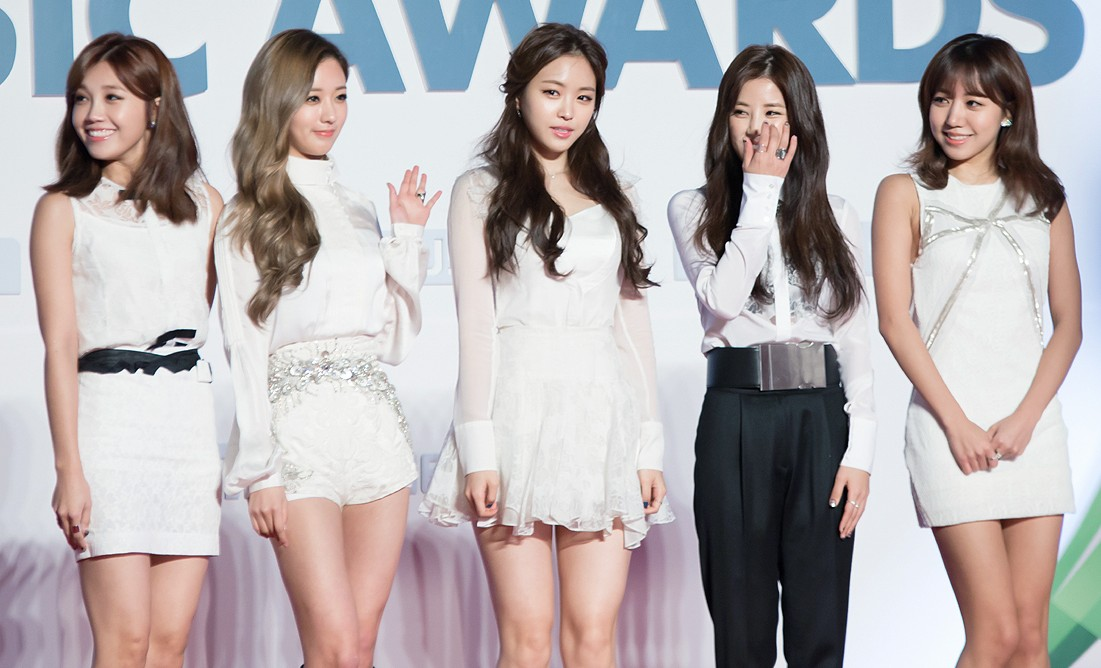
Apink, Best Dance Award (Female)

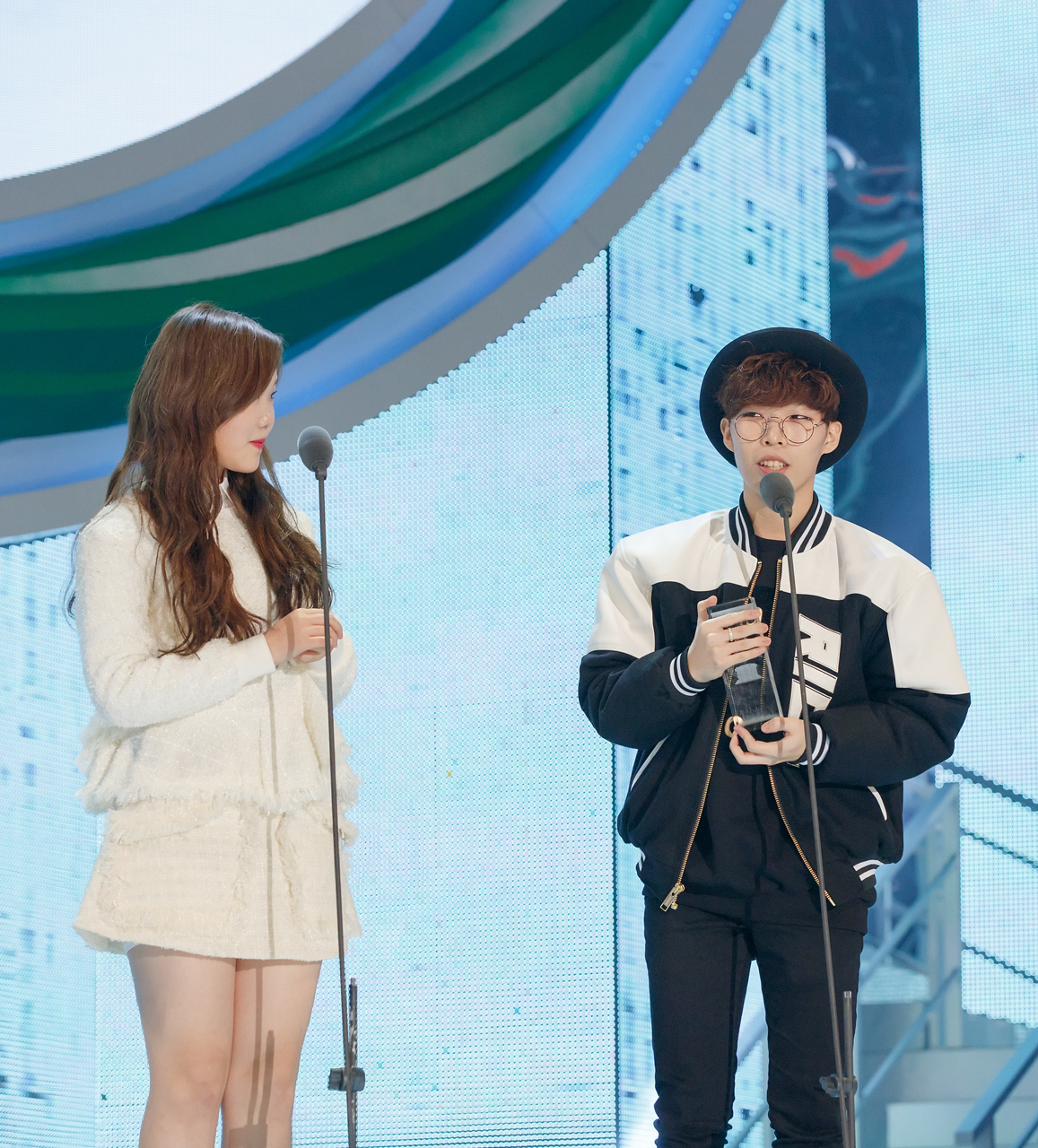
AKMU, Best Folk Award & Top 10 Artists

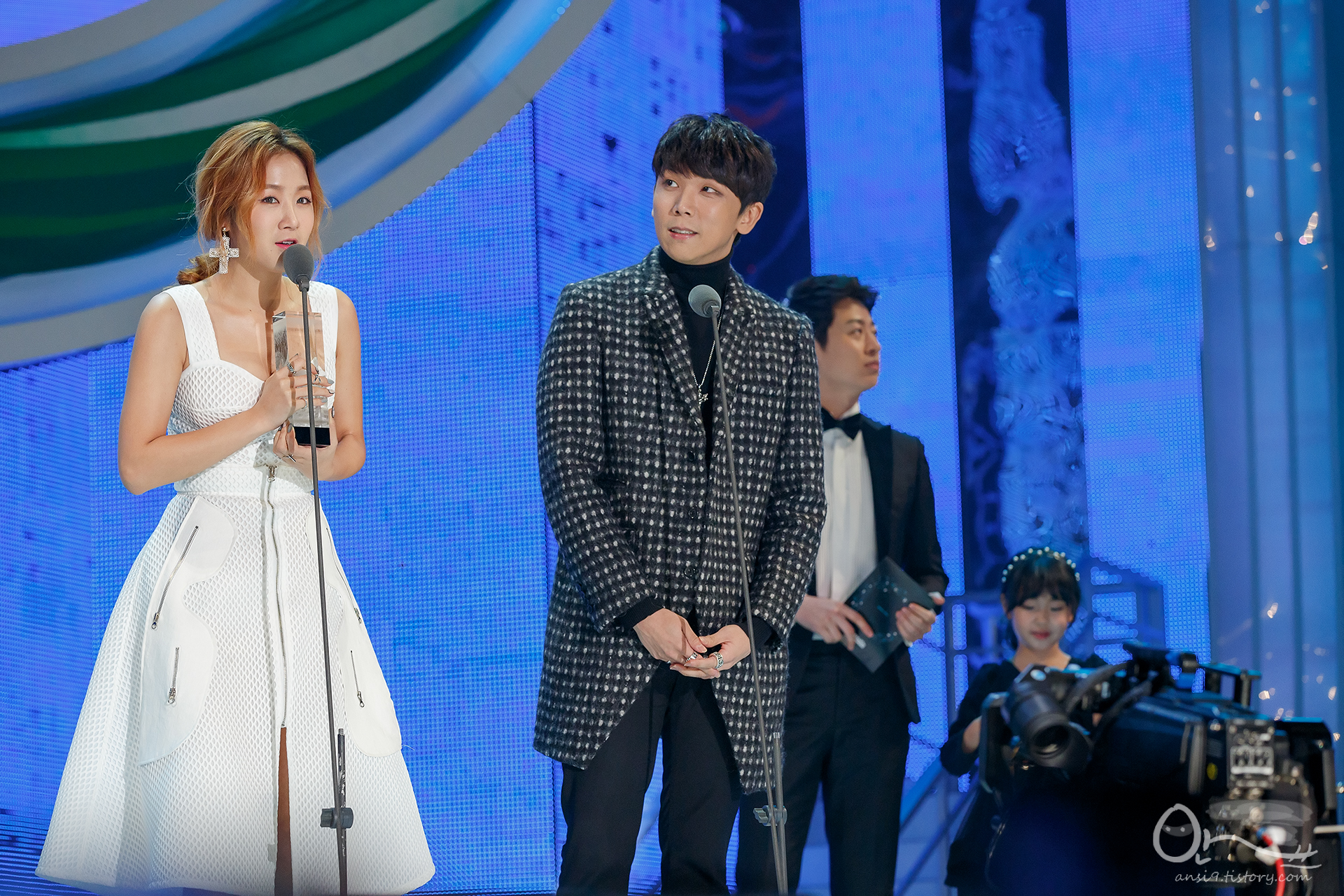
Soyou and Junggigo, Hot Trend Award

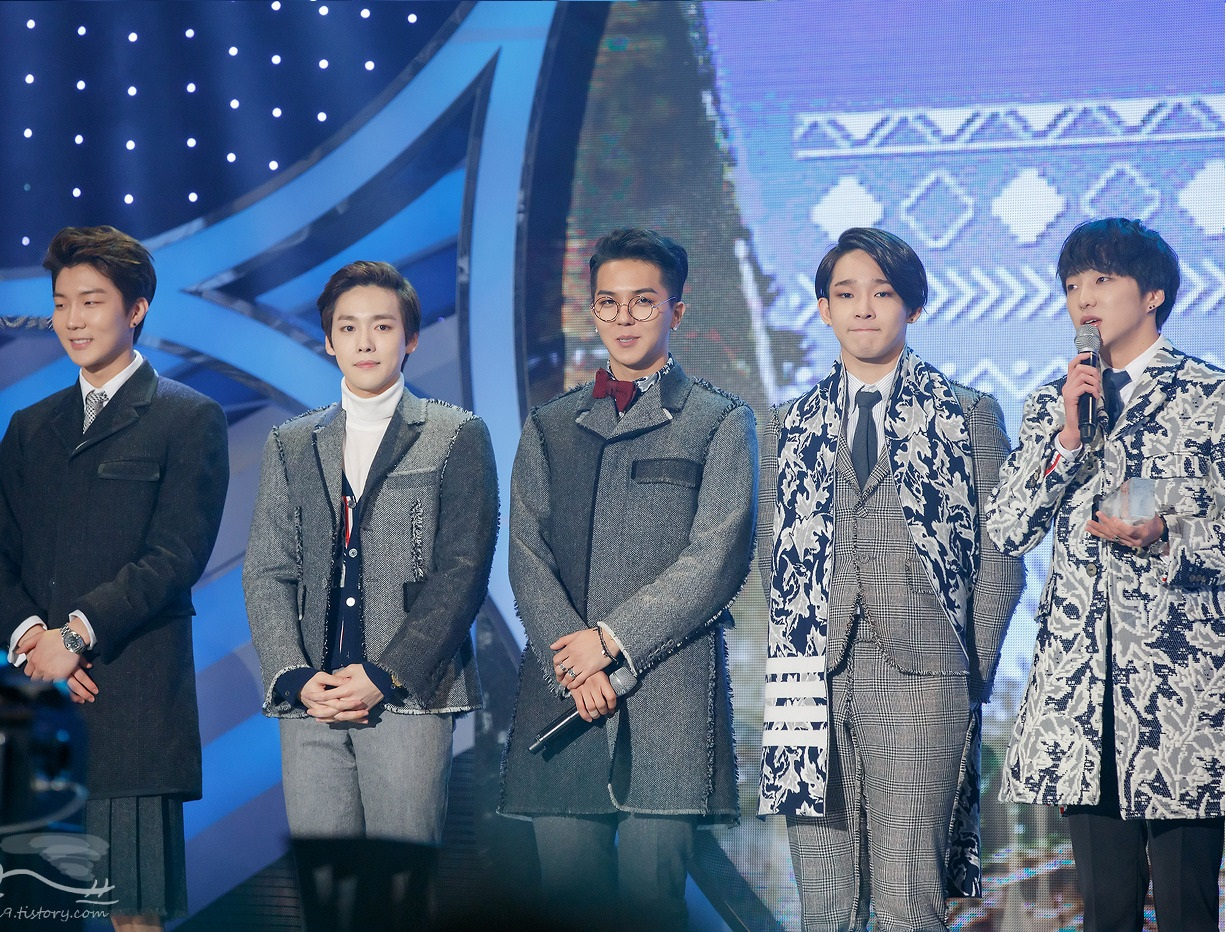
Winner, Best New Artist

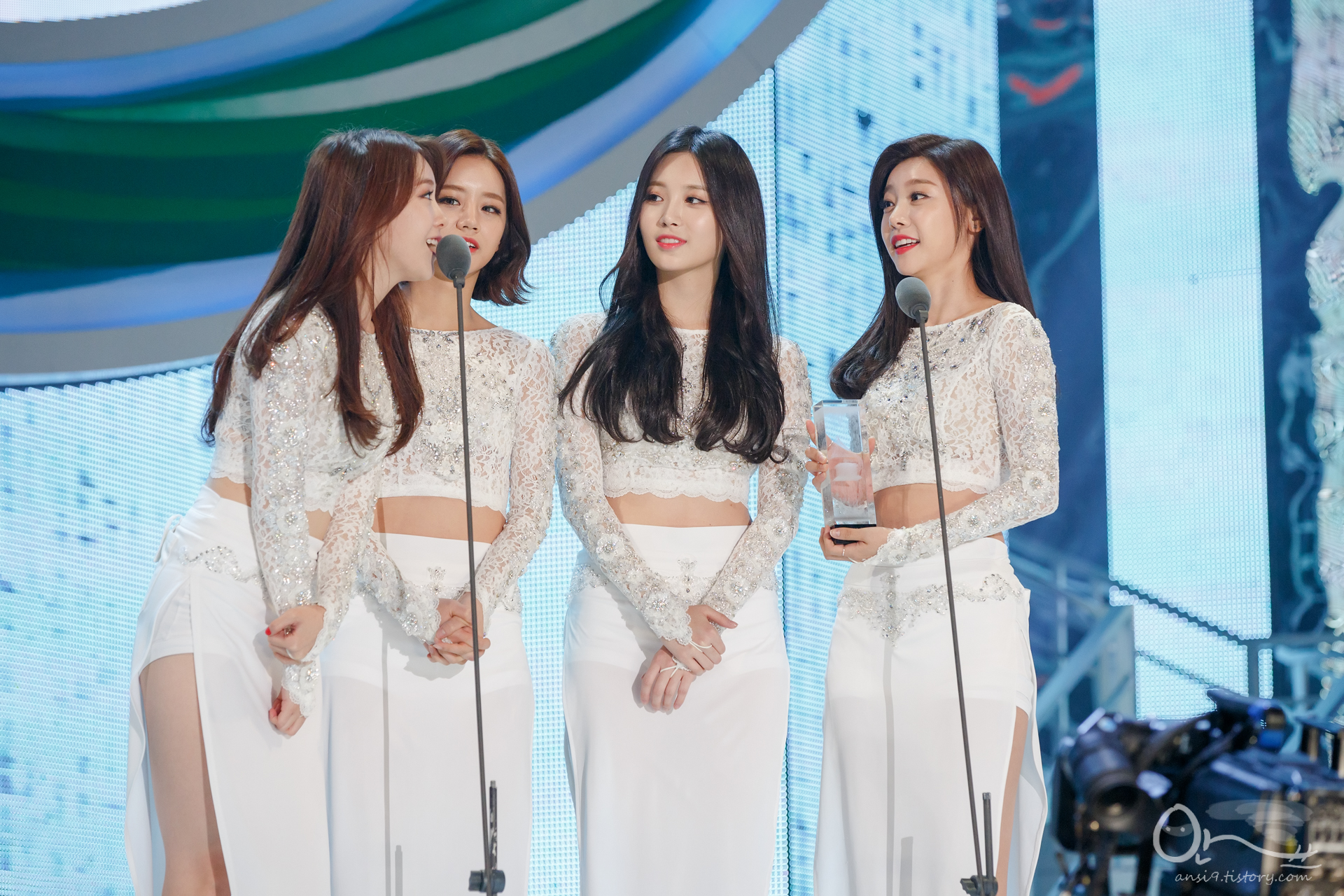
Girl's Day, Top 10 Artists

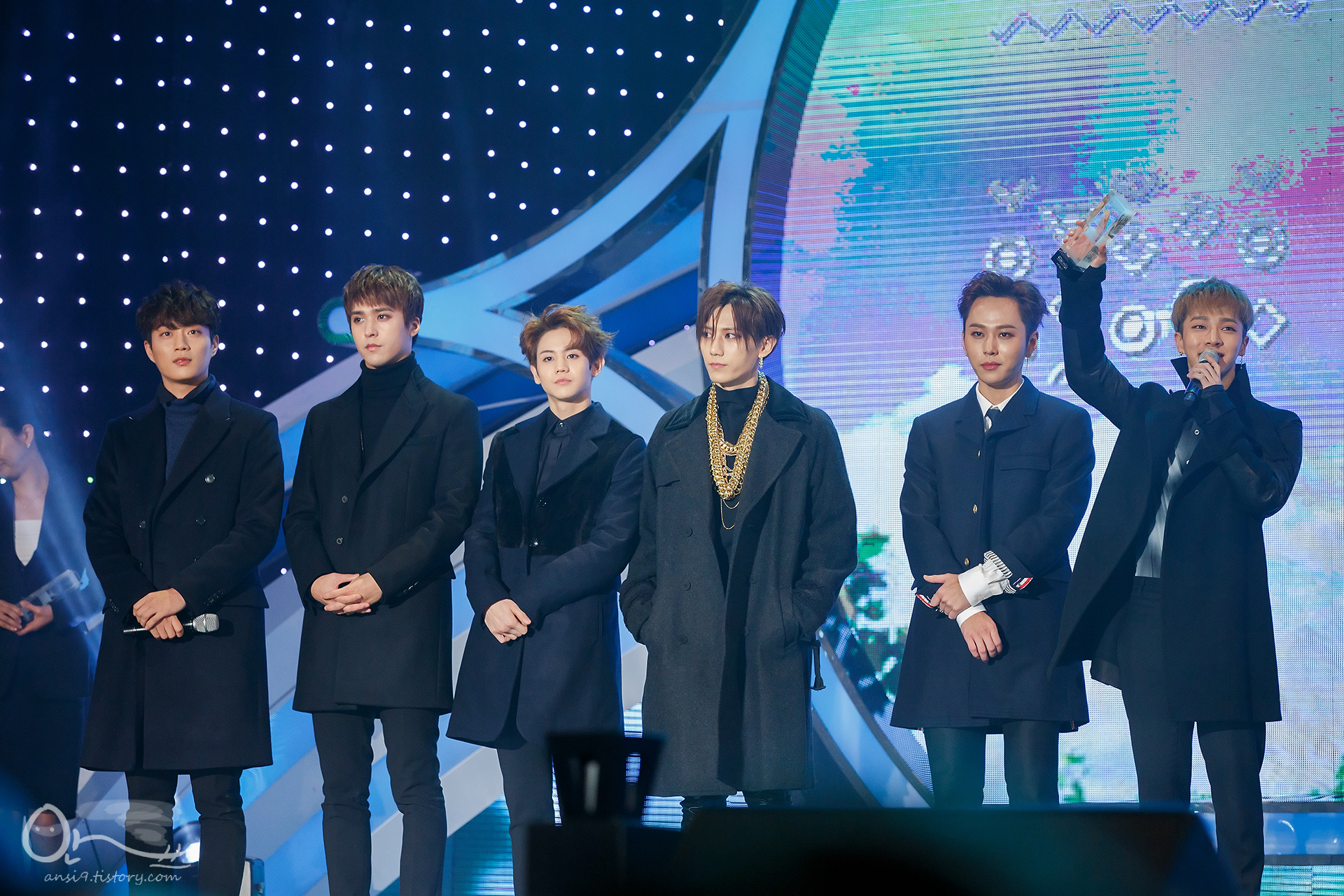
Beast, Netizen Popularity Award & Top 10 Artists
