= Eyes, Nose, Lips =

2014 single by Taeyang

Single by Taeyang

from the album Rise
- Language: Korean
- Released: June 3, 2014
- Recorded: 2014
- Studio: YG (Seoul)
- Genre: R&B
- Length: 3:50
- Label: YG
- Composers: Teddy Park; Dee.P; P.K; Bekuh Boom
- Lyricists: Teddy Park; Taeyang
- Producers: Taeyang; Dee.P; Teddy Park

Taeyang singles chronology
"Ringa Linga" (2013)	"Eyes, Nose, Lips" (2014)	"1AM" (2014)

Music video
- "Eyes, Nose, Lips" on YouTube

"Eyes, Nose, Lips" (Korean: 눈, 코, 입; RR: Nun, ko, ip) is a song recorded by South Korean singer Taeyang, serving as the second single for his second studio album Rise (2014). It was co-produced by Teddy Park, Bekuh Boom, Dee.P and P.K, and written by Park and Taeyang. The song peaked at the top of the Gaon Digital Chart and the K-pop Hot 100, and went on to become the second best-performing single of 2014.

== Background and composition ==
On May 29, 2014, YG Entertainment announced the song as the title track of the album, and will be released simultaneously with the album on June 3, with the music video. Taeyang talked about the song with Billboard, saying it was the last song that was completed from the album, and was the reason of releasing the album. He also described the process of creating the song, saying, "While Teddy was writing out the chords, Becca came along and wrote out the melody on the spot. I liked it so much, and I believed I could put a fresh feel to it with my voice. After finishing the demo recordings, I discussed my personal experiences with Teddy, which he thought would be cool to incorporate as lyrics. We were able to write a song together about missing an old lover, reminiscing about their eyes, nose and lips. It's a very emotional track.".

"Eyes, Nose, Lips" was described as "an R&B-style song with a solid piano sound" accompanying the singer's "appealing vocals." Composed using common time in the key of C major, with a moderate tempo of 72 to 76 beats per minute, the song features the lyrics "I can’t erase you even when you’re gone / I still remember your eyes, nose, lips, touch and your small nails," and "Can I ever see you again just for a moment, or even by chance / I get anxious day by day" that expresses a faint longing for the past loved one. The Star Online noted that the track is a "heartfelt love song that's heavy on the piano and low on audio enhancements."

== Promotion ==
Taeyang's performed the song for the first time was on Inkigayo on June 6, 2014. His second comeback stage which was on M! Countdown. He also performed it at the talk show You Hee-yeol's Sketchbook.

On June 15, YG Entertainment announced a "cover project" in which its artists will be covering songs from others. Akdong Musician were the first to release a cover of "Eyes, Nose, Lips." Tablo covered the song with a rap version and Taeyang appeared during its bridge part. Lydia Paek was the third YG Family artist to cover the song for the project.

== Critical reception ==
"Eyes, Nose, Lips" received positive reception, and being named one of the best songs of the year. Melody L. Goh from The Star Online wrote that Taeyang "may have just hit musical gold" with the song, while Douglas Markowitz of Miami New Times stated that, "even if you can't understand the lyrics, you can feel the passion in his voice." Jakob Dorof of Noisey described the single as "painfully pretty as must be the girl it describes" and complimented the single's "carefully counted build towards one of the year's most well deserved key change catharses." Scott Interrante of PopMatters wrote that "Eyes, Nose, Lips" is "emotionally powerful" and admired Tayeang's vocals and the music video. Additionally, Kult Scene said that Taeyang "lets the listeners feel the sadness and anger of the situation stated in the track" and added that "Eyes, Nose, Lips" is the most vulnerable song from the singer and "one that will go down as one of his best songs."

"Eyes, Nose, Lips" on listicles
Critic/Publication	List	Rank	Ref.
Channel V Asia	15 Best K-Pop Songs From 2014	1	
IZM	2014 Singles of the Year	2	
Melon	Top 100 K-pop Songs of All Time	46	
Music Y	Top 10 Songs of 2014	4	
Noisey	The 20 Best K-Pop Songs of 2014	14	
PopMatters	The Best K-pop of 2014	8	

== Commercial performance ==
Upon its release, the song debuted at number one on Gaon's Digital and Download charts, selling 322,577 copies on its first week. On the Streaming Chart, the single reached a peak position of number one on its second week, following a top three debut. "Eyes, Nose, Lips" remained at the first position in the Streaming Chart for five consecutive weeks. The song topped the June monthly Digital, Download and Streaming charts, with 765,833 downloads with 21.7 streams. "Eyes, Nose, Lips" was the second best performing single of 2014 in South Korea, with 1,613,109 downloads and 74.7 million streams by the end of the year.

"Eyes, Nose, Lips" debuted on Billboard's K-Pop Hot 100 at number 34. The following week the song jumped to number one on the chart, giving Taeyang his first solo chart-topper and his third overall, counting with his band Big Bang's two number ones. The song charted third on Billboard's World Digital Singles.

== Covers ==
In 2016, Hong Kong singer G.E.M. recorded a cover of "Eyes, Nose, Lips" titled "Red and White" (红蔷薇白玫瑰), which was later included on her re-recorded album I Am Gloria (2025).

== Accolades ==
Awards and nominations for "Eyes, Nose, Lips"
Ceremony	Year	Award	Result	Ref.
Melon Music Awards	2014	Song of the Year	Won	
Melon Music Awards	2014	Best R&B / Soul Award	Nominated	
Mnet Asian Music Awards	2014	Song of the Year	Won	
Mnet Asian Music Awards	2014	Best Vocal Performance – Male	Won	
Philippine K-pop Awards	2014	Song of the Year	Won	
Gaon Chart Music Awards	2015	Best Song of June	Won	
Golden Disc Awards	2015	Digital Daesang	Won	
Golden Disc Awards	2015	Digital Bonsang	Won	
Myx Music Awards	2015	Favorite K-pop Video	Nominated	

Music program awards
Program	Date	Ref.
M! Countdown	June 12, 2014	
M! Countdown	June 19, 2014	
M! Countdown	July 3, 2014	
Show! Music Core	June 14, 2014	
Inkigayo	June 15, 2014	
Inkigayo	June 22, 2014	
Inkigayo	July 6, 2014	
Music Bank	June 20, 2014	

== Charts ==
=== Weekly charts ===
2014 weekly chart performance for "Eyes, Nose, Lips"
Chart (2014)	Peak position
South Korea (Gaon)	1
South Korea (K-pop Hot 100)	1
US World Digital Song Sales (Billboard)	3

2025 weekly chart performance for "Eyes, Nose, Lips"
Chart (2025)	Peak position
Vietnam Official Chart (IFPI)	17
Vietnam Hot 100 (Billboard)	12

=== Monthly charts ===
Monthly chart performance for "Eyes, Nose, Lips"
Chart (2014)	Peak position
South Korea (Gaon)	1

=== Year-end charts ===
Year-end charts for "Eyes, Nose, Lips"
Chart (2014)	Position
South Korea (Gaon)	2
US World Digital Songs (Billboard)	23

== Certifications and sales ==
Certifications for "Eyes, Nose, Lips"
Region	Certification	Certified units/sales
South Korea	—	2,500,000
Streaming
Japan (RIAJ)	Gold	50,000,000^{†}
^{†} Streaming-only figures based on certification alone.

== Release history ==
Release history for "Eyes, Nose, Lips"
Region	Date	Version	Format	Label	Ref
Various	June 3, 2014	Korean	Digital download; streaming	YG	
Various	August 13, 2014	Japanese	Digital download; streaming	YGEX	

== See also ==
- List of Gaon Digital Chart number ones of 2014
- List of K-pop Hot 100 number ones of 2014
