= Geonjeongayo =

South Korean music genre

Geonjeongayo (Korean: 건전가요; Hanja: 健全歌謠) was a South Korean musical genre promoted by the South Korean government that was characterized by lyrics with themes of social education and learning but was often used for political propaganda of the government. The genre met its decline in the 1990s after the South Korean government was democratized and is now extinct.

== History ==
=== Colonial origins ===
The origins of the genre can be traced back to the days when Korea was occupied by Japan. The genre was then called Gukmingayo (國民歌謠) or Gajeonggayo (家庭歌謠, songs that can be safely sung in their homes with families). After the onset of the Sino Japanese war in 1937, the Japanese empire considered Korea as a great rear area to provide supplies to the Japanese soldiers, and to promote the spirit of Korean people supplying for the Japanese military, the colonial government founded the Joseon Munyehoe (朝鮮文藝會, Korean literature association) and the group led movements to "purify" songs to fit with the propaganda. In the 1940s, under the leadership of the Gukminchongryokchosunyeonmaeng, the national song revising movement proceeded, with the songs produced as a result of this movement being called Gukmingayo. These movements were all led by the colonial government.

=== Post liberation ===
The Gukmingayo movement continued after liberation. In 1949. the government received applications of new gukmingayos through the "Propaganda strategy committee" which was administered under the Bureau of Public Information(공보처).Early examples of the genre was "Let's go to the workplace(일터로가자)" and "The song of saving money(저축의 노래)". In 1957, the South Korean Bureau of culture and public information considered the influences of popular songs to the South Korean society and made efforts to create and distribute Geonjeongayos (directly translated as Wholesome songs). In the 1960s, as a result of anti communist policies of the South Korean government, even civil groups who had anti communist ideology began to create geonjeon gayos which sung anti communist songs such as "The song of anti communism(반공의노래)", and during the Vietnam War, military style songs such as "Private Kim in the Republic of Korea Army(육군 김일병)","red mufflers(빨간마후라)" were popular in South Korean music charts. There is a song that was a wholesome song in the past but was banned. Morning Dew was designated as a wholesome song in 1973, but it was banned in 1975 and lifted in 1987. In 1976, through the "patriotic song recommendation plan" by the performance ethics committee, lot of movements that promote the ideologies of then leader Park Chunghee was promoted, and there was a song called "My fatherland" composed and written by the president Park Chunghee himself. In 1979, a law that forced musicians to insert at least one Geonjeongayo per album (irrespective of the genre of the album) and all the Korean albums published at the time after that was also asked to include a list of Geonjeongayos for the public to listen to.

The genre gained huge popularity in the 1980s because most songs coincided with the sentiments of commercial songs that were popular at the time. The geonjeongayos were typically listed in side Bs of LP records or placed as the last track of the album. The geonjeongayos of the 1980s were also known as Shingukmingayo (The new national song). From the late 1980s, the genre lost popularity as it often functioned as a promotion of then dictatorship governments in the name of public interests. After the 1988 Seoul Olympics and the democratization of South Korea after the fall of the Dictatorship, singing geonjeongayos began to be not required by law to be in an album.

== Purpose ==
The Geonjeongayos that were published right after the liberation of Korea functioned more as a tool for reclaiming national identity and independence and removing Japanese influences, but it was also used as a tool for effective control of ideologies along with censorship of South Korean music, and is reflective of authoritarian culture.
