= Cheongnyangni 588 =

Former red-light district in Seoul

Cheongnyangni 588 Korean: 청량리 588; Hanja: 淸凉里 588
- District
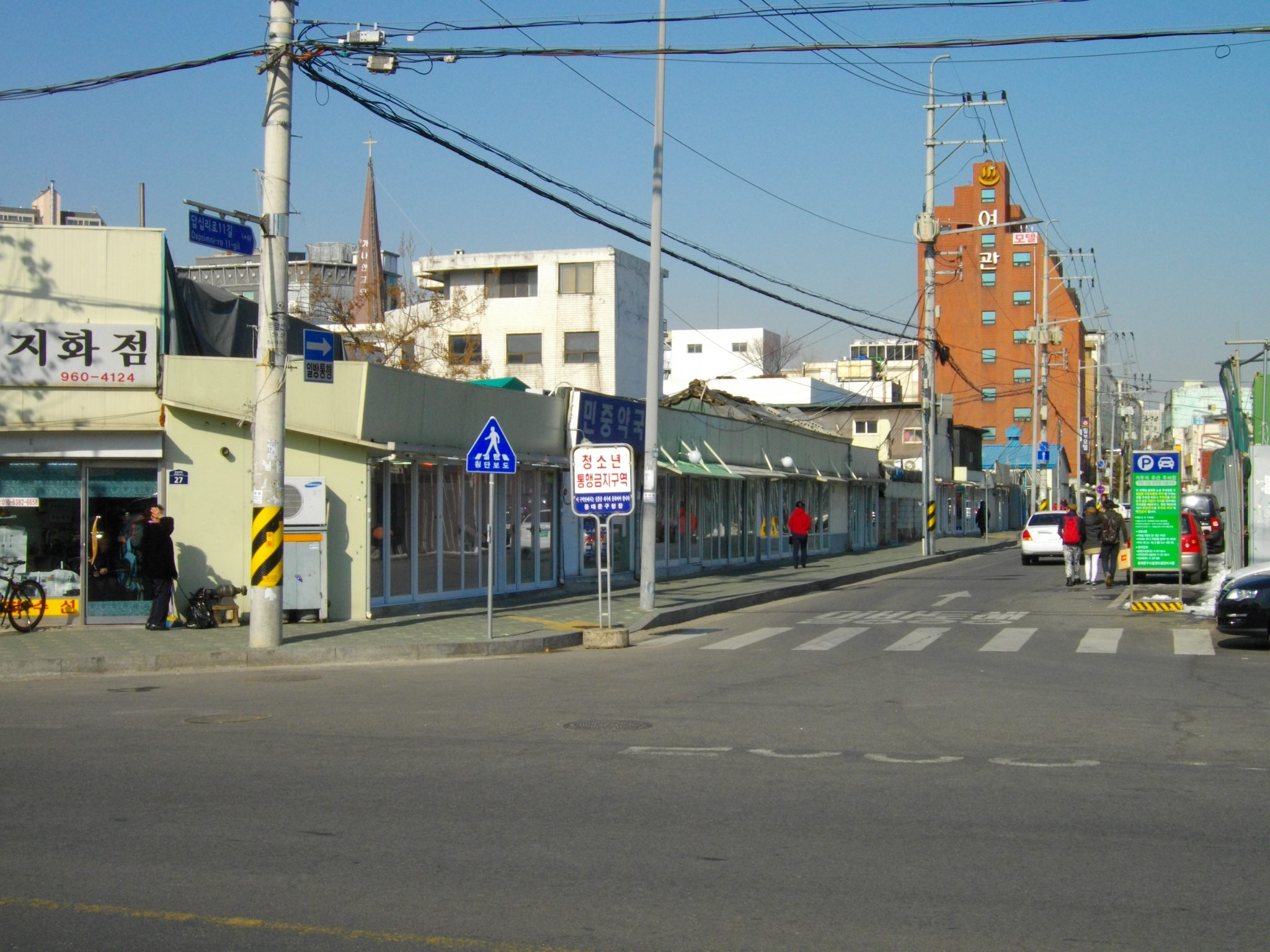
- Cheongnyangni 588 in 2013

- Location in Seoul
- Coordinates: 37°34′41″N 127°02′41″E
- Country: South Korea
- City: Seoul
- District: Dongdaemun District

Area
  - Total: 4 ha (9.9 acres)

Cheongnyangni 588 (Korean: 청량리 588; Hanja: 淸凉里 588) is a now-defunct red-light district in Dongdaemun District, Seoul, South Korea. It was located near the Cheongnyangni station. By 2022, the last brothels were closed, with new construction occurring in the area.

Cheongnyangni is often referred to as "Oh Pal Pal", meaning "five eight eight" in Korean possibly due to a bus which once passed through the area. At its peak in the 1980s, it housed 200 brothels and 500 prostitutes, and was the largest red-light district in Seoul.

== History ==
The area was first became used for prostitution during the 1910–1945 Japanese occupation following the building of Cheongnyangni Station. In the 1950s during the Korean War, the station had many soldiers passing through it and these soldiers were the main customers for the area.

The lifting of the nighttime curfew in 1982, (which had been in place since the end of WW2), increased trade to the area.

In 1988 Seoul hosted the Summer Olympics. In an attempt to improve the area ahead of the Olympics, windows were fitted to the front of the sex establishments in the style of Amsterdam's De Wallen district. This improvement of the area was backed by the government.

In 2004, the South Korean government passed an anti-prostitution law (Special Law on Sex Trade 2004) prohibiting the buying and selling of sex and shutting down brothels. Although now illegal, and despite police crackdowns, the area continued.

== Closure ==
The Seoul Metropolitan Government (SMG) set up a "Civic watchdog programme" to try to shut down the district in 2013, some vigilante actions occurred under this scheme.

Plans to redevelop the area were announced by the SMG. The re-development entailed demolishing the area and building of four 65-story luxury residential-commercial complexes and a 42-story shopping mall by 2020. At the end of 2016 the closure of the 156 brothels started, although may of the sex-workers had already left, many having previously left to work in massage parlors or huegaetael (sex-hotels). Demolition started in March 2017, at which time 8 brothels and 40 sex-workers were still operating. One brothel remained in operation until March 2018.

== In literature ==
The Cheongnyangni district is mentioned in several works of fiction and non-fiction as the setting for a crime drama Seoul: Lost in the big city (ISBN 978-0956476517) and also in the book In Search of Life (ISBN 978-0956476500).
