= Ailee discography =

Works by Korean-American singer-songwriter Ailee

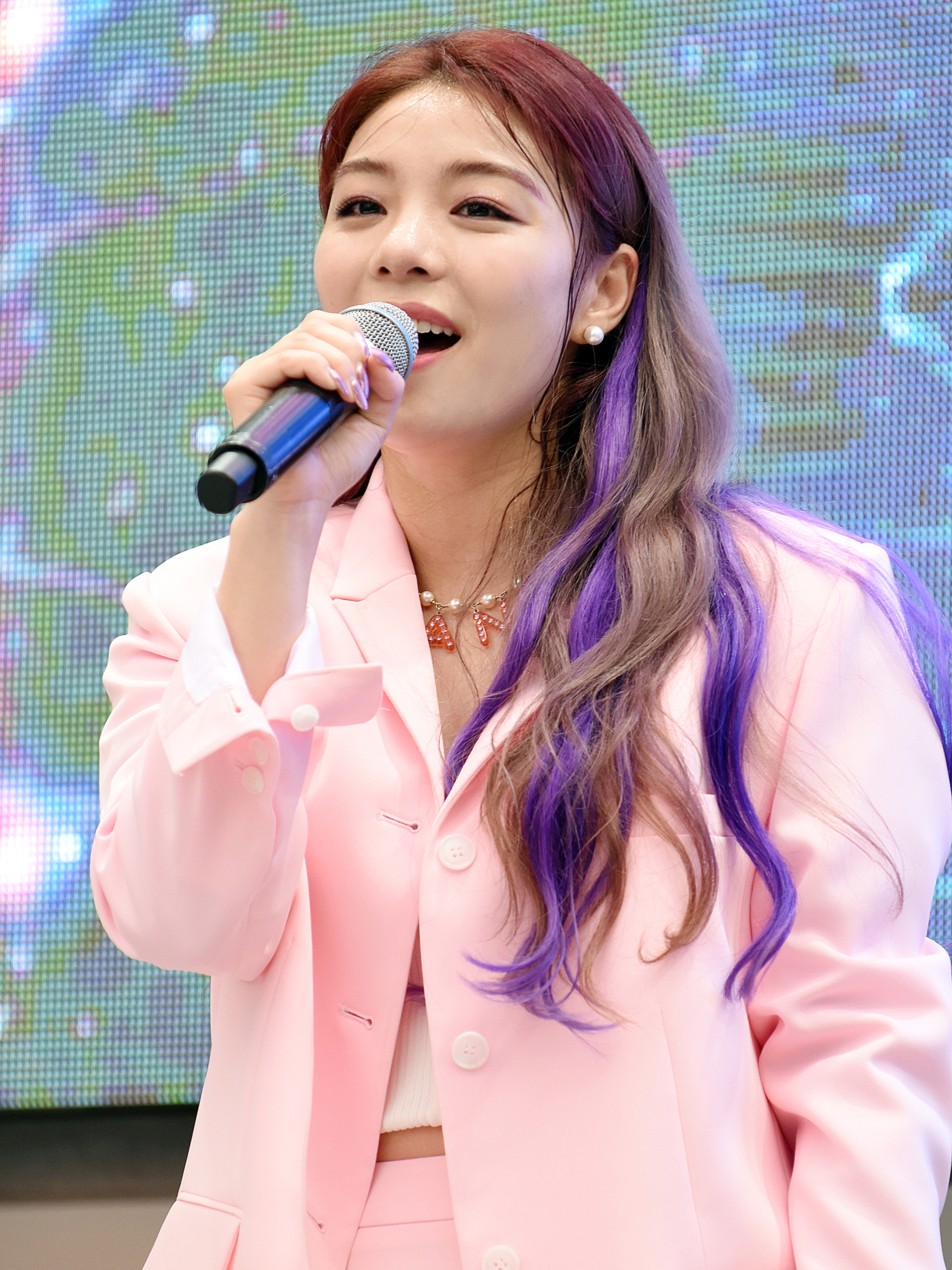
- Studio albums: 4
- EPs: 6
- Singles: 23
- Music videos: 26
- Single albums: 1

Korean-American singer-songwriter Ailee has released four studio albums, six extended plays, and twenty one singles. She has also participated in featured songs of various Korean artists, and made several soundtrack contributions.

== Albums ==
=== Studio albums ===
List of studio albums, with selected details, chart positions, and sales
Title	Album details	Peak chart positions			Sales
Title	Album details	KOR	JPN	US World	Sales
Vivid	Released: October 1, 2015 (KOR); Label: YMC Entertainment; Formats: CD, digital download	7	—	6	KOR: 5,400
Butterfly	Released: July 2, 2019 (KOR); Label: Dream T Entertainment; Formats: CD, digital download	32	—	13	KOR: 2,580
Amy	Released: October 27, 2021 (KOR); Label: The L1ve; Formats: CD, digital download	48	—	—	—N/a
I'm Lovin' Amy	Released: March 7, 2022 (ENG); Label: The L1ve; Formats: CD, digital download	—	—	—	—N/a
"—" denotes releases that did not chart or were not released in that region.

=== Single albums ===
List of single albums, with selected details, chart positions, and sales
Title	Album details	Peak chart positions	Sales
Title	Album details	KOR	Sales
Ra Ta Ta	Released: October 10, 2023; Label: A2Z, Dreamus; Formats: CD, digital download	93	KOR: 1,227

== Extended plays ==
List of extended plays, with selected details, chart positions, and sales
Title	Album details	Peak chart positions			Sales
Title	Album details	KOR	JPN	US World	Sales
Invitation	Released: October 16, 2012; Label: YMC Entertainment; Formats: CD, digital download	10	—	—	KOR: 10,555
A's Doll House	Released: July 12, 2013; Label: YMC Entertainment; Formats: CD, digital download	6	—	—	KOR: 9,220
Magazine	Released: September 25, 2014; Label: YMC Entertainment; Formats: CD, digital download	6	—	10	KOR: 6,251
A New Empire	Released: October 5, 2016; Label: YMC Entertainment; Formats: CD, digital download	10	—	9	KOR: 2,478
I'm	Released: October 6, 2020; Label: Rocket3 Entertainment; Formats: CD, digital download	45	—	—	KOR: 1,491
Lovin'	Released: May 7, 2021; Label: Rocket3 Entertainment; Formats: CD, digital download	64	—	—	—N/a
(Me)moir	Released: March 20, 2025; Label: A2Z Entertainment; Formats: CD, digital download	98	—	—	KOR: 637
"—" denotes releases that did not chart or were not released in that region.

== Singles ==
=== As lead artist ===
Title	Year	Peak chart positions					Sales	Album
Title	Year	KOR	KOR Hot	JPN	JPN Hot	US World	Sales	Album
Korean
"Heaven"	2012	3	3	—	—	—	KOR: 3,228,000	Invitation
"I Will Show You" (보여줄게)	2012	3	2	—	—	7	KOR: 2,500,000	Invitation
"Evening Sky" (저녁 하늘)	2012	31	—	—	—	—	KOR: 137,000	Invitation
"Scent of a Woman" (여인의 향기)	2013	30	—	—	—	—	KOR: 145,000	Strawberry Extreme Festival Part 1
"U&I" (유앤아이)	2013	1	1	—	—	14	KOR: 1,488,000	A's Doll House
"No No No" (노노노)	2013	21	—	—	—	—	KOR: 189,000	A's Doll House
"Rainy Day"	2013	31	—	—	—	—	KOR: 136,000	A's Doll House
"Higher" (featuring Yiruma)	2013	5	—	—	—	—	KOR: 352,791	Non-album singles
"Singing Got Better" (노래가 늘었어)	2014	1	3	—	—	—	KOR: 1,466,000	Non-album singles
"Don't Touch Me" (손대지마)	2014	2	—	—	—	16	KOR: 1,298,000	Magazine
"Sudden Illness" (문득병)	2014	69	—	—	—	—	KOR: 61,000	Magazine
"Goodbye Now" (이제는 안녕)	2014	77	—	—	—	—	KOR: 53,000	Magazine
"Johnny" (쟈니)	2015	9	—	—	—	—	KOR: 205,000	Non-album single
"Mind Your Own Business" (너나 잘해)	2015	6	—	—	—	20	KOR: 723,000	Vivid
"If You"	2016	1	—	—	—	—	KOR: 880,000	A New Empire
"Home" (featuring Yoon Mi-rae)	2016	20	—	—	—	—	KOR: 157,000	A New Empire
"Reminiscing" (낡은 그리움)	2017	30	—	—	—	—	KOR: 52,000	Non-album single
"Room Shaker"	2019	54	49	—	—	22	—N/a	Butterfly
"Sweater" (Korean and English ver.) (Note: "Sweater (Orchestral Version)" was released in December 4, 2020.)	2019	— (Note: "Sweater" did not enter Gaon Digital Chart, but peaked 136 position on the Gaon Download Chart.)	—	—	—	—	—N/a	Non-album single
"When We Were in Love" (우리 사랑한 동안)	2020	88	28	—	—	—	—N/a	I'm
"Silent Night"	2020	—	—	—	—	—	—N/a	Non-album single
"Make Up Your Mind"	2021	139	—	—	—	—	—N/a	Lovin'
"Spring Flowers" (봄꽃)	2021	— (Note: "Spring Flowers" did not enter Gaon Digital Chart, but peaked 53 position on the Gaon Download Chart.)	—	—	—	—	—N/a	Lovin'
"Starting Now" (깨어나)	2021	— (Note: "Starting Now" did not enter Gaon Digital Chart, but peaked 46 position on the Gaon Download Chart.)	—	—	—	—	—N/a	Non-album single
"Don't Teach Me" (가르치지마)	2021	122	—	—	—	—	—N/a	Amy
"I'll Hold You" (잡아줄게)	2023	— (Note: "I'll Hold You" did not enter Circle Digital Chart, but peaked 28 position on the Circle Download Chart.)	—	—	—	—	—N/a	Ra Ta Ta
"Ra Ta Ta" (featuring Lil Cherry)	2023	— (Note: "Ra Ta Ta" did not enter Circle Digital Chart, but peaked 19 position on the Circle Download Chart.)	—	—	—	—	—N/a	Ra Ta Ta
"One Day" (하루)	2024	84	—	—	—	—	—N/a	Non-album single
"Love That Only Heaven Allows"	2024	—	—	—	—	—	—N/a	Non-album single
"The Boss"	2024	—	—	—	—	—	—N/a	Non-album single
"Stronger"	2024	—	—	—	—	—	—N/a	Non-album single
"Psalms 150 Project, Vol. 7"	2024	—	—	—	—	—	—N/a	Non-album single
"MMI"	2025	—	—	—	—	—	—N/a	(Me)moir
"Meaning"	2025	—	—	—	—	—	—N/a	(Me)moir
"Illusion"	2025	—	—	—	—	—	—N/a	(Me)moir
Japanese
"Heaven"	2013	—	—	24	38	—	—N/a	Non-album singles
"U&I"	2014	—	—	110	—	—	—N/a	Non-album singles
"Sakura"	2015	—	—	—	—	—	—N/a	Non-album singles
English
"Shoe Game"	2010	—	—	—	—	—	—N/a	Non-album singles
"Fall Back" (as A.Leean)	2017	—	—	—	—	—	—N/a	Non-album singles
"Sweater"	2019	—	—	—	—	—	—N/a	Non-album singles
"Murder on the Dance Floor"	2022	— (Note: "Murder on the Dance Floor" did not enter the Gaon Digital Chart, but peaked at number 42 on the Gaon Download Chart.)	—	—	—	—	—N/a	I'm Lovin' Amy
"—" denotes releases that did not chart or were not released in that region.

=== Collaborations ===
Title	Year	Peak chart positions		Sales	Album
Title	Year	KOR	KOR Hot	Sales	Album
"Go Away" (with Maboos, CHAKUN and Feeldog)	2013	40	—	KOR: 72,313	Deux 20th Anniversary Tribute Album
"Almost Paradise" (with Eric Benét)	2014	—	—	—N/a	From E to U: Volume 1
"I'm in Love" (아임 인 러브) (with 2LSON)	2014	3	—	KOR: 651,810	1 Year
"A Real Man" (with Swings)	2014	4	—	KOR: 565,165	Non-album single
"Like Nobody Knows" (아무도 모르게) (with Cheetah)	2015	4	—	KOR: 691,246	Unpretty Rapstar Compilation
"Q&A" (with S.Coups, Woozi and Vernon of Seventeen)	2015	58	—	KOR: 78,463	Non-album single
"Kiss" (with Wheesung)	2016	—	—	—N/a	Transformation
"Thirst" (갈증) (with Mad Clown)	2018	—	—	—N/a	Non-album singles
"Shine" (with Jeong DongHwan of MeloMance)	2018	—	—	—N/a	Non-album singles
"Fly Away" (with Shin Seung-hun)	2018	54	—	—N/a	The Call 1st Project
"Fall Away" (with Kim Bum-soo)	2018	— (Note: Fall Away didn't enter Gaon Digital Chart, but peaked 84 position on the Gaon Download Chart.)	—	—N/a	The Call 2nd Project
"Jealous" (질투나) (with Gummy)	2018	70	—	—N/a	The Call 3rd Project
"Call My Name" (with Gummy and Jung-in)	2018	—	—	—N/a	The Call 4th Project
"Remember" (among The Call artists)	2018	—	—	—N/a	The Call FINAL Project
"Duty Free" (with Bewhy and Taeil)	2018	—	—	—N/a	The Call FINAL Project
"A Farewell Story" (Live) (이별이야기) (with Jung Seung-hwan)	2020	191	—	—N/a	Non-album singles
"What About You" (묻지마) (with Ravi)	2020	— (Note: "What About You" did not enter Gaon Digital Chart, but peaked 71 position on the Gaon Download Chart.)	—	—N/a	Non-album singles
"Don't Cry for Me" (with Sleeq)	2020	—	—	—N/a	Good Girl Episode 2
"GG" (with Hyoyeon and Jiwoo)	2020	—	—	—N/a	Good Girl Episode 4
"Grenade" (with Yunhway)	2020	—	—	—N/a	Good Girl Final
"Solo Christmas" (홀로 크리스마스) (with Wheein)	2021	90	90	—N/a	Non-album single
"I Will Go to You Like the First Snow" (첫눈처럼 너에게 가겠다) (with Kim Ki-tae)	2022	—	—	—N/a	Famous Singers - Battle Again Part.11
"Is It Still Beautiful" (여전히 아름다운지) (with Park Jin-joo, Mijoo and Haewon)	2025	124	—	—N/a	Non-album single
"—" denotes releases that did not chart or were not released in that region.

=== As featured artist ===
Title	Year	Peak chart positions	Sales	Album
Title	Year	KOR	Sales	Album
"The Guys Are Coming" (놈들이 온다) (Wheesung featuring Ailee)	2011	7	KOR: 1,122,843	He is Coming
"Love Again" (2BIC featuring Ailee)	2012	19	KOR: 703,735	Hu+Man
"Highlight" (Eru featuring Ailee)	2012	—	—N/a	Feel Brand New Part 2
"I Forgot You" (Joosuc featuring Ailee)	2012	56	KOR: 151,546	5 Point 5
"Shower of Tears" (눈물샤워) (Baechigi featuring Ailee)	2013	1	KOR: 1,880,676	BaeChiGi – Vol. 4 Part.2
"If It Ain't Love" (이게 사랑이 아니면) (Verbal Jint featuring Ailee)	2013	7	KOR: 923,610	If It Ain't Love
"Wash Away" (Geeks featuring Ailee)	2013	4	KOR: 998,423	Backpack
"Love Hurts" (더 사랑하는 쪽이 아프다) (Pro C featuring Ailee)	2014	45	KOR: 68,973	Non-album singles
"Beautiful" (2000 Won featuring Ailee)	2014	25	KOR: 104,079	Non-album singles
"Baby, It's Cold Outside" (Sung Si-kyung featuring Ailee)	2014	—	—N/a	Winter Wonderland
“Loyalty” (Groovy Room featuring Ailee and Dok2)	2016	—	—N/a	Non-album single
"Bamdeelalila" (밤디라리라) (Clon featuring Ailee)	2017	—	—N/a	Clon – 20th Anniversary
"Sea of Love" (with Fly to the Sky)	2019	—	—N/a	Fly High
"Journey" (Gwangil Jo featuring Ailee, Hangzoo and Gaeko)	2021	101	—N/a	Show Me the Money 10 Final
"—" denotes releases that did not chart or were not released in that region.

== Promotional singles ==
Title	Year	Peak chart positions	Sales	Album
Title	Year	KOR	Sales	Album
"My Grown Up Christmas List"	2012	20	KOR: 170,558	Hitman Project #1 : A Tribute to the Hitman, David Foster
"Fighting Spirit" (투혼가)	2014	—	—N/a	Red Devil 5th "We Are the Reds"
"Together as One" (with Various Artists)	2016	—	—N/a	Hooxi, The Beginning
"3rd Hangang River Bridge (Live Ver.)" (제3한강교(Live Ver.))	2020	—	—N/a	The 3rd Han River Bridge in Uninvited and Uninvited
"Shangnoksu 2020" (상록수 2020) (with Various Artists)	2020	—	—N/a	Non-album singles
"Me Me We" (나 너 우리) (with Ravi and Newkidd featuring Aizat Amdan, Chillies, PAAM, Quest and Rahmania Astrini)	2020	—	—N/a	Non-album singles
"Yukino Hana" (눈의 꽃)	2021	— (Note: "Yukino Hana" did not enter Circle Digital Chart, but peaked 92 position on the Circle Download Chart.)	—N/a	Cyworld BGM 2021
"I will show you" (보여줄게)	2022	—	—N/a	New Festa Episode.4
"I will go to you like the first snow" (첫눈처럼 너에게 가겠다)	2022	—	—N/a	New Festa Episode.4
"Kiss me happy (Prod. Ryan Match)"	2022	—	—N/a	Listen-Up EP.1
"I feel so alone"	2023	— (Note: "I feel so alone" did not enter Circle Digital Chart, but peaked 16 position on the Circle Download Chart.)	—N/a	Suspicious Workshop Episode 2
"Dream of a Doll" (인형의 꿈)	2023	TBA	—N/a	A song that catches my ear Part.01
"—" denotes releases that did not chart or were not released in that region.

== Soundtrack appearances ==
Title	Year	Peak chart positions		Sales	Album
Title	Year	KOR	US World	Sales	Album
"Racing Queen" (with Mighty Mouth)	2011	81	—	—N/a	Racing Queen 2 OST
"Superstar" (with Hyolyn and Jiyeon)	2012	11	—	KOR: 793,030	Dream High 2 OST
"Love Note" (사랑 첫 느낌)	2012	28	—	KOR: 158,293	Full House Take 2 OST
"Ice Flower" (얼음꽃)	2013	8	—	KOR: 757,116	King of Ambition OST
"Tears Stole the Heart" (눈물이 맘을 훔쳐서)	2013	4	—	KOR: 1,001,916	Secret Love OST
"Day by Day" (하루하루)	2014	19	—	KOR: 303,482	Triangle OST
"Goodbye My Love" (잠시 안녕처럼)	2014	12	13	KOR: 478,914	You Are My Destiny OST
"Are You the Same" (그대도 같은가요)	2015	15	—	KOR: 281,183	Shine or Go Crazy OST
"Because It's Love" (사랑이니까)	2016	56	—	—N/a	Come Back Mister OST
"I Can't Live Without You" (니가 있어야 살아) (featuring Truedy)	2016	96	—	—N/a	Entertainer OST
"I Will Go to You Like the First Snow" (첫눈처럼 너에게 가겠다)	2017	1	10	KOR: 5,000,000	Guardian: The Lonely and Great God OST
"Rewrite..If I Can" (다시 쓰고 싶어)	2018	32	—	—N/a	Flower Ever After OST
"Blue Spring" (파란 봄)	2018	— (Note: "Blue Spring" did not enter Gaon Digital Chart, but peaked 92 position on the Gaon Download Chart.)	—	—N/a	Dunia: Into a New World OST
"Is You"	2018	63	—	—N/a	Memories of the Alhambra OST
"The Poem of Destiny" (운명의 시)	2019	—	—	—N/a	Arthdal Chronicles OST
"Just Look for You" (그저 바라본다)	2019	85	—	—N/a	Chocolate OST
"Blue Bird"	2020	— (Note: "Blue Bird" did not enter Gaon Digital Chart, but peaked 130 position on the Gaon Download Chart.)	—	—N/a	Start-Up OST
"In Memory" (기억 속으로)	2021	— (Note: "In Memory" did not enter Gaon Digital Chart, but peaked 65 position on the Gaon Download Chart.)	—	—N/a	A Way Station OST
"My Last Love (In Paradisum)"	2021	— (Note: "My Last Love (In Paradisum)" did not enter Gaon Digital Chart, but peaked 24 position on the Gaon Download Chart.)	—	—N/a	Sisyphus: The Myth OST
"Believe"	2021	— (Note: "Believe" did not enter Gaon Digital Chart, but peaked 38 position on the Gaon Download Chart.)	—	—N/a	PlayerUnknown's Battlegrounds OST
"Breaking Down"	2021	134	—	—N/a	Doom at Your Service OST
"When Your Tears Wet My Eyes" (너의 눈물이 나의 눈을 적실 때)	2021	142	—	—N/a	Lovers of the Red Sky OST
"Nobody Else"	2022	119	—	—N/a	Under the Oak Tree OST
"Two Faced" (슬픈 연극)	2022	172	—	—N/a	The Forbidden Marriage OST
"To the Bride" (신부에게)	2022	— (Note: "To the Bride" did not enter Circle Digital Chart, but peaked 41 position on the Circle Download Chart.)	—	—N/a	Welcome to Wedding Hell OST
"When the Rain Stops" (그랬으면 좋겠네)	2022	— (Note: "When the Rain Stops" did not enter Circle Digital Chart, but peaked 33 position on the Circle Download Chart.)	—	—N/a	The Law Cafe OST
"I’m Sorry"	2022	113	—	—N/a	Alchemy of Souls: Light and Shadow OST
"Gone"	2023	— (Note: "Gone" did not enter Circle Digital Chart, but peaked 42 position on the Circle Download Chart.)	—	—N/a	Pandora: Beneath the Paradise OST
"—" denotes releases that did not chart or were not released in that region.

== Compilation appearances ==
Title	Year	Peak chart positions	Sales	Album
Title	Year	KOR	Sales	Album
"Light and Shadow" (빛과 그림자)	2012	—	—N/a	Immortal Songs: Singing the Legend (Patty Kim Vol. 1)
"Spring Rain" (봄비)	2012	—	—N/a	Immortal Songs: Singing the Legend (Lee Eunha)
"Besame Mucho" (베사메무쵸)	2012	—	—N/a	Immortal Songs: Singing the Legend (Hyunin)
"My Second Home" (제2의 고향)	2012	—	—N/a	Immortal Songs: Singing the Legend (Yoon Soo-il)
"Lonely Lover" (고독한 연인)	2012	—	—N/a	Immortal Songs: Singing the Legend (Lee Gun-woo)
"What Do I Do" (나 어떡해)	2012	—	—N/a	Immortal Songs: Singing the Legend (Legendary Campus Band)
"Don't Leave Me" (날 떠나지마)	2012	31	KOR: 153,958	Immortal Songs: Singing the Legend (Park Jinyoung 2nd)
"What Am I Supposed to Do?" (나는 어떡하라구)	2012	—	—N/a	Immortal Songs: Singing the Legend (Yoon Hang-ki & Yoon Bok-hee )
"Busy" (통화중)	2012	—	—N/a	Immortal Songs: Singing the Legend (Fire Engine Edition)
"Like a Night on Saturday" (토요일은 밤이 좋아)	2012	—	—N/a	Immortal Songs: Singing the Legend (Composer Lee Hojun)
"Morning Dew" (아침이슬)	2012	—	—N/a	Immortal Songs: Singing the Legend (Yang Hee-eun Part. 2)
"Ties" (인연)	2012	30	KOR: 175,233	Immortal Songs: Singing the Legend (Yoon Il-sang)
"I Hate Hatred" (싫다 싫어)	2012	—	—N/a	Immortal Songs: Singing the Legend (Hyun Cheol)
"3! 4!" (with Shin Bo-ra)	2012	30	KOR: 166,866	Immortal Songs: Singing the Legend (Summer Song of Top 10 Songs)
"Night's Dream" (하룻밤의 꿈)	2012	—	—N/a	Immortal Songs: Singing the Legend (Lee Sang-woo & Lee Sang-eun)
"Rose" (장미)	2012	—	—N/a	Immortal Songs: Singing the Legend (Lee Jang-hee Part. 1)
"My Heart Towards You" (너를 향한 마음)	2012	—	—N/a	Immortal Songs: Singing the Legend (Lee Sung-hwan)
"Dance within the Rhythm" (리듬 속의 그 춤을)	2012	—	—N/a	Immortal Songs: Singing the Legend (Shin Joong-Hyeon, Part 1) (Wang Joong Wang)
"My Dear" (님아) (with Baechigi)	2013	—	—N/a	Immortal Songs: Singing the Legend (Pearl Sisters Version)
"Hey, Hui" (희야)	2013	—	—N/a	Immortal Songs: Singing the Legend (Lee Seung-chul)
"Empty Glass" (빈 잔)	2013	67	KOR: 38,420	Immortal Songs: Singing the Legend (Namjin Part 1)
"You Reflected in a Smile" (미소 속에 비친 그대)	2014	—	—N/a	Immortal Songs: Singing the Legend (The Rival Special Edition 1)
"It's Not Love If It Hurts Too Much" (너무 아픈 사랑은 사랑이 아니었음을)	2014	—	—N/a	Immortal Songs: Singing the Legend (Edited by Kim Kwang-Seok)
"Green Wood" (희나리) (with Lee Ji-hoon)	2014	—	—N/a	Immortal Songs: Singing the Legend (Happy Together)
"Let's Go on a Trip" (여행을 떠나요) (with Shin Bo-ra)	2014	—	—N/a	Immortal Songs: Singing the Legend (Summer Special Vol. 1)
"Everyone" (여러분)	2014	72	KOR: 29,460	Immortal Songs: Singing the Legend (Edited by Bok-Hee Yoon)
"Cocktail Love" (칵테일 사랑)	2014	—	—N/a	Immortal Songs: Singing the Legend (Million Seller Special Part. 1)
"Ambiguous" (아리송해)	2015	—	—N/a	Immortal Songs: Singing the Legend (The King of Kings' Show, Shosho Show 1)
"Don't Say Words That Hurt" (이젠 가슴 아픈 말 하지 말아요)	2015	—	—N/a	Immortal Songs: Singing the Legend (Songwriter Kim Jeong-tak)
"That Woman" (그 여자) (featuring Wheesung)	2015	—	—N/a	Immortal Songs: Singing the Legend (Edited by Kim Kwang-Seok)
"I Will Survive" (아리송해) (with Solar, Luna and Eunji)	2015	—	—N/a	2015 Gayo Daejeon Limited Edition
"I Will Show You" (보여줄게) (featuring HEDY, Kim Sae-ha and Park Hyejin)	2016	—	—N/a	Fantastic Duo Part.4
"Heaven" (featuring HEDY)	2016	—	—N/a	Fantastic Duo Part.5
"Don't Forget Me" (나를 잊지 말아요)	2016	—	—N/a	Immortal Songs: Singing the Legend (Composer Jeon Youngrok)
"Letter" (편지)	2017	—	—N/a	Immortal Songs: Singing the Legend (Edited by Kwangjin Kim)
"I Have a Lover" (애인... 있어요)	2017	—	—N/a	Immortal Songs: Singing the Legend (Composer Yoon Il-sang)
"Heaven" (featuring Lee Mu-jin)	2021	— (Note: "Heaven (feat. Lee Mu-jin)" did not enter Circle Digital Chart, but peaked 124 position on the Circle Download Chart.)	—N/a	Famous Singers Exhibition Part.8
"Write to Love With a Pencil" (사랑은 연필로 쓰세요)	2021	—	—N/a	Immortal Songs: Singing the Legend (Part 2 by husband and wife composer and lyricist Nam Guk-in and the late Jeong Eun-i)
"Love Me Once Again" (미워도 다시 한번)	2021	—	—N/a	Immortal Songs: Singing the Legend (Artist Vibe)
"Hot Stuff" (featuring LACHICA)	2022	—	—N/a	Immortal Songs: Singing the Legend (Go Go 70 Special)
"—" denotes releases that did not chart or were not released in that region.

== Other charted songs ==
Title	Year	Peak positions	Album
Title	Year	KOR Gaon	Album
"Into the Storm"	2012	49	Invitation
"My Love"	2012	80	Invitation
"Shut Up"	2012	87	Invitation
"Evening Sky"	2012	21	Invitation
"How Could You Do This to Me"	2013	77	A's Doll House
"Scandal"	2013	91	A's Doll House
"I'll Be Ok"	2013	94	A's Doll House
"Crazy"	2014	35	Magazine
"Insane"	2015	85	Vivid
"I Love You, I Hate You"	2015	87	Vivid
"Feelin'" (featuring Eric Nam)	2016	— (Note: "Feelin'" didn't enter Gaon Digital Chart, but peaked at position 70 on the Gaon Download Chart.)	A New Empire
"Tattoo"	2021	— (Note: "Tattoo" didn't enter Gaon Digital Chart, but peaked at position 94 on the Gaon Download Chart.)	Lovin'
"Bling"	2021	— (Note: "Bling" didn't enter Circle Digital Chart, but peaked at position 137 on the Circle Download Chart.)	Amy
"New Ego"	2021	— (Note: "New Ego" didn't enter Circle Digital Chart, but peaked at position 140 on the Circle Download Chart.)	Amy
"My Lips"	2021	— (Note: "My Lips" didn't enter Circle Digital Chart, but peaked at position 177 on the Circle Download Chart.)	Amy
"What If I"	2021	— (Note: "Bling" didn't enter Circle Digital Chart, but peaked at position 198 on the Circle Download Chart.)	Amy
"Big It Up"	2023	— (Note: "Big It Up" didn't enter Circle Digital Chart, but peaked at position 89 on the Circle Download Chart.)	RA TA TA
"—" denotes releases that did not chart or were not released in that region.

== Other appearances ==
List of non-single guest appearances
Title	Year	Other artist(s)	Album
"Oran C" (from the Oran C commercial song)	2014	—N/a	Non-album song
"Kahit Isang Saglit"	2020	Troy Laureta	Kaibigan: A Troy Laureta OPM Collective, Vol. 1

== Composition credits ==
All song credits are adapted from the Korea Music Copyright Association's database unless stated otherwise.

Year	Artist	Song	Album	Lyrics	Music
2014	Ailee	"Suki" (スキ)	U&I (Japanese Ver.)	Yes	Yes
2014	Ailee	"이제는 안녕" (Goodbye Now)	Magazine	Yes	No
2014	Ailee	"문득병" (Sudden Illness)	Magazine	Yes	Yes
2014	Ailee	"Teardrop"	Magazine	Yes	No
2015	Ailee	"Insane"	Vivid	Yes	Yes
2015	Ailee	"Second Chance"	Vivid	Yes	No
2015	Ailee (feat. Chancellor)	"Symphony"	Vivid	Yes	Yes
2015	Ailee	"How Can Someone Be This Way" (사람이 왜 그래)	Vivid	Yes	Yes
2015	Ailee (feat. Amber Liu)	"Letting Go"	Vivid	Yes	Yes
2015	Ailee	"Filling Up My Glass" (잔을 채우고)	Vivid	Yes	No
2015	Ailee	"One Step Closer" (한걸음 더)	Vivid	Yes	No
2016	Ailee (feat. Yoon Mi-rae)	"Home"	A New Empire	Yes	No
2016	Ailee	"까꿍" (Peekaboo)	A New Empire	Yes	No
2016	Ailee (feat. Eric Nam)	"Feelin'"	A New Empire	Yes	Yes
2016	Ailee (feat. Tak of Baechigi)	"Live or Die"	A New Empire	Yes	Yes
2016	Ailee	"I Need You"	A New Empire	Yes	No
2018	Ailee & Gummy	"Jealous" (질투나)	The Call 3rd Project	Yes	Yes
2018	Ailee & Jung-in & Gummy	"Call My Name"	The Call 4th Project	Yes	No
2018	Ailee & Taeil & BewhY	"Duty Free"	The Call Final Project	Yes	Yes
2019	Ailee	"Midnight"	Butterfly	Yes	No
2019	Ailee	"Want it"	Butterfly	Yes	No
2020	Ailee & Ravi	"What About You" (묻지마)	Non-album single	Yes	Yes
2020	Ailee & Sleeq	"Don't Cry for Me"	Good Girl Episode 2	Yes	No
2020	Ailee & Yunhway	"Grenade"	Good Girl Final	Yes	No
2021	Ailee	"Make Up Your Mind"	Lovin'	Yes	No
2021	Ailee	"525"	Lovin'	Yes	No
2021	Ailee	"Lose Myself to You"	Lovin'	Yes	No
2021	Ailee	"Ain't Talkin' About Me"	Lovin'	Yes	No
2021	Ailee	"Spring Flowers" (봄꽃)	Lovin'	Yes	No
2021	Ailee	"New Ego"	Amy	Yes	No
2021	Ailee	"가르치지마" (Don't Teach Me)	Amy	Yes	No
2021	Ailee	"#MCM (Man Crush Monday)"	Amy	Yes	No
2022	Ailee	"Nobody Else (Under the Oak Tree X Ailee)"	Under the Oak Tree OST	Yes	No

== Music videos ==
Year	Title	Notes
2012	"Heaven"	
2012	"I Will Show You" (보여줄게)	
2012	"Evening Sky" (저녁 하늘)	Now Is Good OST
2012	"Love Note" (사랑 첫 느낌)	Full House Take 2 OST
2012	"My Grown Up Christmas List"	
2013	"Ice Flower" (얼음꽃)	King of Ambition OST
2013	"U&I" (유앤아이)	
2013	"Heaven"	Japanese Version
2014	"Singing Got Better" (노래가 늘었어)	
2014	"Don't Touch Me" (손대지마)	
2015	"Sakura"	Lyric Video
2015	"Mind Your Own Business" (너나 잘해)	
2015	"Insane"	
2016	"Because It's Love" (사랑이니까)	Come Back Mister OST
2016	"If You"	Starring Lim Na-young of I.O.I
2016	"Home" (featuring Yoon Mi-rae)	
2017	"Reminiscing" (낡은 그리움)	
2018	"Rewrite..If I Can" (다시 쓰고 싶어)	Flower Ever After OST
2018	"Blue Spring" (파란 봄)	Dunia: Into a New World OST
2018	"Is You"	Memories of the Alhambra OST
2019	"Room Shaker"	
2019	"The Poem of Destiny" (운명의 시)	Arthdal Chronicles OST
2019	"Sweater" (스웨터)	Korean Version
2019	"Sweater"	English Version
2020	"What About You" (묻지마) (with Ravi)	Live Clip
2020	"When We Were in Love" (우리 사랑한 동안)	
2021	"Make Up Your Mind"	
2021	"Spring Flowers" (봄꽃)	Live Clip
2021	"Starting Now" (깨어나)	
2021	"Don't Teach Me" (가르치지마)	
2021	"Solo Christmas" (홀로 크리스마스) (with Wheein)	Live Clip
2023	"I Keep Ending Up With You"	The Ghost and Molly McGee OST
