= List of awards and nominations received by Ailee =

Ailee awards and nominations
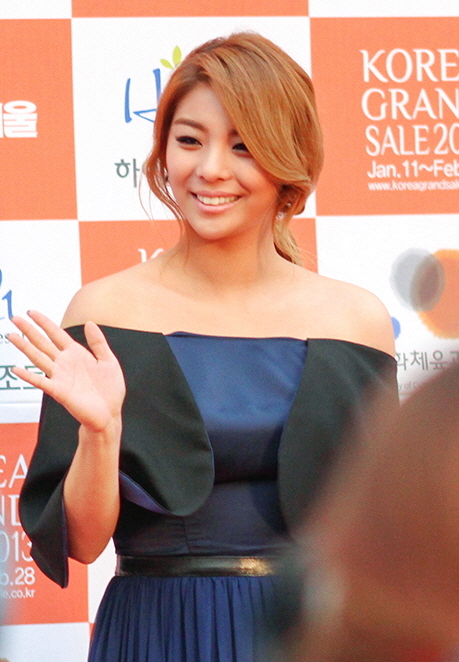
- Ailee at the red carpet of the 22nd Seoul Music Awards in January 2013
Awards and nominations
Award	Wins	Nominations
Asia Song Festival	1	1
Circle Chart Music	1	2
Cyworld Digital Music	2	2
Golden Disc	4	7
MAMA	6	21
Melon Music	4	14
Seoul Music	3	6
APAN Star Awards	1	1
Asia Artist Awards	1	3
Korea Cable TV Awards	1	1
Korea Drama Awards	1	1
Mnet Pre-Grammy Awards	1	1
Seoul International Drama Awards	1	1
Soribada Best K-Music Awards	1	3
Cable TV Broadcasting Awards	1	1
Korean Culture and Entertainment Awards	3	3
Seoul Success Awards	1	1
SBS Awards Festival	2	2
So-Loved Awards	3	3
Korea Best Star Awards	1	1

Totals (Note: Certain award groups do not simply award one winner. They acknowledge several different recipients, have runners-up, and have third place. Since this is a specific recognition and is different from losing an award, runner-up mentions are considered wins in this award tally. For simplification and to avoid errors, each award in this list has been presumed to have had a prior nomination.)
- Wins: 39
- Nominations: 75

This is list of awards and nominations received by a Korean-American singer-songwriter Amy Lee, better known by her stage name Ailee. Ailee debuted with the song "Heaven" in 2012 and received several awards within her first year as an artist. She was signed to YMC Entertainment in South Korea and Warner Music in Japan. She has won 39 music awards.

== Awards and nominations ==
The name of the award ceremony, year presented, category, nominee of the award, and the result of the nomination
Award ceremony	Year	Category	Nominee / work	Result	Ref.
APAN Star Awards	2014	Best Original Soundtrack	"Goodbye My Love"	Won	
Asia Artist Awards	2017	Popularity Award	Ailee	Nominated	
Asia Artist Awards	2017	Best OST Award	"I Will Go to You Like the First Snow"	Won	
Asia Artist Awards	2018	Artist Award	Ailee	Nominated	
Asia Song Festival	2012	Best New Artist	Ailee	Won	
Cable TV Broadcasting Awards	2015	Artist Award	Ailee	Won	
Cyworld Digital Music Awards	2012	Song of the Month (February)	"Heaven"	Won	
Cyworld Digital Music Awards	2012	Rookie of the Month	"Heaven"	Won	
Gaon Chart Music Awards	2013	New Female Solo Artist	Ailee	Won	
Gaon Chart Music Awards	2015	Popular Singer of the Year	Ailee	Nominated	
Golden Disc Awards	2013	Best New Artist	Ailee	Won	
Golden Disc Awards	2014	Digital Bonsang	"U&I"	Won	
Golden Disc Awards	2014	Digital Daesang	"U&I"	Nominated	
Golden Disc Awards	2015	Digital Bonsang	"Don't Touch Me"	Won	
Golden Disc Awards	2015	Digital Daesang	"Don't Touch Me"	Nominated	
Golden Disc Awards	2017	Digital Bonsang	"If You"	Nominated	
Golden Disc Awards	2018	Best OST Award	"I Will Go to You like the First Snow"	Won	
Korea Best Star Awards	2018	Korea's Best Singer Award	Ailee	Won	
Korea Cable TV Awards	2017	Best Original Soundtrack Daesang	”I Will Go to You Like the First Snow"	Won	
Korea Drama Awards	2014	Best Original Soundtrack	"Goodbye My Love"	Won	
Korean Culture and Entertainment Awards	2013	Grand Prize Award	Ailee	Won	
Korean Culture and Entertainment Awards	2014	Grand Prize Award	Ailee	Won	
Korean Culture and Entertainment Awards	2015	Singer of the Year	Ailee	Won	
Melon Music Awards	2012	Best R&B/Ballad	"Heaven"	Nominated	
Melon Music Awards	2012	Song of the Year	"Heaven"	Nominated	
Melon Music Awards	2012	Best New Artist	Ailee	Won	
Melon Music Awards	2012	Top 10 Artist	Ailee	Nominated	
Melon Music Awards	2013	Top 10 Artist	Ailee	Won	
Melon Music Awards	2013	Artist of the Year	Ailee	Nominated	
Melon Music Awards	2013	Song of the Year	U&I	Nominated	
Melon Music Awards	2013	Rap / Hip Hop Award	"Shower of Tears"	Won	
Melon Music Awards	2014	Best Ballad	"Singing Got Better"	Nominated	
Melon Music Awards	2014	Song of the Year	"Singing Got Better"	Nominated	
Melon Music Awards	2017	Top 10 Artist	Ailee	Nominated	
Melon Music Awards	2017	Kakao Hot Star Award	Ailee	Nominated	
Melon Music Awards	2017	Song of the Year	"I Will Go to You Like the First Snow"	Nominated	
Melon Music Awards	2017	Best OST Award	"I Will Go to You Like the First Snow"	Won	
Mnet Asian Music Awards	2012	Best New Female Artist	Ailee	Won	
Mnet Asian Music Awards	2012	UnionPay Artist of the Year	Ailee	Nominated	
Mnet Asian Music Awards	2013	Best Vocal Performance - Female	"U&I"	Won	
Mnet Asian Music Awards	2013	UnionPay Song of the Year	"U&I"	Nominated	
Mnet Asian Music Awards	2013	Best Female Artist	Ailee	Nominated	
Mnet Asian Music Awards	2013	UnionPay Artist of the Year	Ailee	Nominated	
Mnet Asian Music Awards	2014	Best Female Artist	Ailee	Nominated	
Mnet Asian Music Awards	2014	UnionPay Artist of the Year	Ailee	Nominated	
Mnet Asian Music Awards	2014	Best Vocal Performance - Female	"Singing Got Better"	Won	
Mnet Asian Music Awards	2014	UnionPay Song of the Year	"Singing Got Better"	Nominated	
Mnet Asian Music Awards	2014	UnionPay Song of the Year	"Don't Touch Me"	Nominated	
Mnet Asian Music Awards	2014	Best Female Dance Performance	"Don't Touch Me"	Nominated	
Mnet Asian Music Awards	2015	Best Female Artist	Ailee	Nominated	
Mnet Asian Music Awards	2015	UnionPay Artist of the Year	Ailee	Nominated	
Mnet Asian Music Awards	2015	Best Vocal Performance - Female	"Mind Your Own Business"	Won	
Mnet Asian Music Awards	2015	UnionPay Song of the Year	"Mind Your Own Business"	Nominated	
Mnet Asian Music Awards	2016	Best Female Artist	Ailee	Nominated	
Mnet Asian Music Awards	2016	UnionPay Artist of the Year	Ailee	Nominated	
Mnet Asian Music Awards	2016	Best Vocal Performance - Female	"If You"	Won	
Mnet Asian Music Awards	2016	UnionPay Song of the Year	"If You"	Nominated	
Mnet Asian Music Awards	2017	Best Original Soundtrack	"I Will Go to You Like the First Snow"	Won	
Mnet Pre-Grammy Awards	2013	Mnet Rising Star Award	Ailee	Won	
SBS Awards Festival	2014	Best Female Solo	Ailee	Won	
SBS Awards Festival	2014	Top 10 Artists	Ailee	Won	
Seoul International Drama Awards	2017	Outstanding Korean Drama OST	"I Will Go to You Like the First Snow"	Won	
Seoul Music Awards	2013	New Artist Award	Ailee	Won	
Seoul Music Awards	2016	Best Female Dance Performance	Ailee	Won	
Seoul Music Awards	2018	Popularity Award	Ailee	Nominated	
Seoul Music Awards	2018	Hallyu Special Award	Ailee	Nominated	
Seoul Music Awards	2018	Bonsang Award	Ailee	Nominated	
Seoul Music Awards	2018	OST Award	"I Will Go to You Like the First Snow"	Won	
Seoul Success Awards	2013	Artist Award	Ailee	Won	
So-Loved Awards	2012	Best Female Rookie	Ailee	Won	
So-Loved Awards	2013	Best Female Solo Artist	Ailee	Won	
So-Loved Awards	2014	Best Female Solo Artist	Ailee	Won	
Soribada Best K-Music Awards	2017	Best Hallyu OST	"I Will Go to You Like the First Snow"	Won	
Soribada Best K-Music Awards	2017	Bonsang Award	Ailee	Nominated	
Soribada Best K-Music Awards	2018	Bonsang Award	"Fly Away"	Nominated	
