= U&I (song) =

- Japanese regular edition cover

Single by Ailee

from the EP A's Doll House
- B-side: "Ladies Night" (JP)
- Released: July 12, 2013 (KR); March 19, 2014 (JP)
- Genre: K-pop
- Length: 3:18
- Label: YMC; Warner Music Japan
- Songwriter(s): Shinsadong Tiger; Kupa
- Producer(s): Shinsadong Tiger; Kupa

Ailee singles chronology
"Scent of a Woman" (2013)	"U&I" (2013)	"No No No" (2013)

Music video
- "U&I" on YouTube

"U&I" is a song recorded in two languages (Korean and Japanese) by South Korean singer Ailee. The Korean version was released as the lead single for her second extended play A's Doll House, via YMC Entertainment on July 12, 2013. In Japan, "U&I" was released as a standalone CD single on March 19, 2014, via Warner Music Japan.

The song experienced commercial success in South Korea, peaking at number one for two consecutive weeks on both the Gaon Digital Chart and K-pop Hot 100. It underperformed in Japan, however, peaking at number 110 on the Oricon Singles Chart.

== Background and release ==
"U&I" was released digitally via YMC Entertainment on July 12, 2013, in conjunction with Ailee's second extended play A's Doll House, serving as its lead single. In Japan, "U&I" was released as the singer's second Japanese single via Warner Music Japan on March 19, 2014. It was physically distributed in multiple versions: a regular edition CD single, a special edition CD, and a limited edition CD + DVD bundle.

Prior to the single's release in the country, "U&I" was selected as the official theme song for several fashion events, including 2014 S/S 'Kobe Collection' and 'Tokyo Girls Collection'.

== Accolades ==
Awards and nominations
Year	Award	Category	Result
2013	Mnet Asian Music Awards	Best Vocal Performance – Female	Won
2013	Mnet Asian Music Awards	Song of the Year	Nominated
2014	Golden Disc Awards	Digital Bonsang	Won
2014	Golden Disc Awards	Digital Daesang	Nominated

Music program awards
Program	Date	Ref.
Show Champion	July 24, 2013	
Music Bank	July 26, 2013	
Music Bank	August 2, 2013	

== Track listing ==
Japanese CD single

- CD 1
1. "U&I" (Japanese ver.) – 3:18
2. "Ladies Night – 4:10
3. "U&I" (Backing Track) – 3:18
4. "Ladies Night" (Backing Track) – 4:06
- CD 2 – Special Edition Only
1. "Heaven" – 3:31
2. "I Will Show You" – 3:52
3. "Evening Sky" – 3:53
4. "Storm" (feat. Verbal Jint) – 3:30
5. "U&I" – 3:14
6. "No No No" – 3:19
7. "Rainy Day" – 3:42
8. "Singing Got Better – 3:19

DVD tracklist

- Ailee Japan Showcase Live @Shibuya O-East
1. "Heaven"
2. "I Will Show You"
3. "U&I"
4. "Heaven" (Japanese ver.)
- Japan Original Music Video Collection
1. "Heaven"
2. "I Will Show You"
3. "U&I"
4. "Singing Got Better"

== Charts ==
=== Weekly charts ===
Chart (2013–14)	Peak position
Japan (Oricon)	110
South Korea (Gaon)	1
South Korea (K-pop Hot 100)	1

=== Monthly charts ===
Chart (July 2013)	Peak position
South Korea (Gaon)	5

=== Year-end charts ===
Chart (2013)	Position
South Korea (Gaon)	51

== Release history ==
Release history for "U&I"
Region	Date	Format	Label
Various	July 12, 2013	Digital download; streaming	YMC Entertainment
Japan	March 19, 2014	CD single; CD+DVD	Warner Music Japan
