= Make Up Your Mind (disambiguation) =

"Make Up Your Mind" is a 2003 song by Theory of a Deadman.

Make Up Your Mind may also refer to one of the following songs:

- "Make Up Your Mind", a song by Florence and the Machine from their 2015 album How Big, How Blue, How Beautiful
- "Make Up Your Mind", a song by Martin Garrix and Florian Picasso from the 2016 EP Seven
- "Make Up Your Mind", a 2021 song by Ailee
- "Make Up Your Mind", a 2023 song by Chris Brown from 11:11
- "Make Up Your Mind", a song by Trixie Mattel from Two Birds

== See also ==
- "Making Your Mind Up", a song by Bucks Fizz
- "Mandy Make Up Your Mind", a song by Arthur Johnston
