= Singing Got Better =

Single by Ailee
- Language: Korean
- Released: January 6, 2014
- Recorded: 2013
- Genre: Rock ballad; R&B
- Length: 3:21
- Label: YMC
- Songwriter(s): Wheesung
- Producer(s): Wheesung; Moonha; Duri

Ailee singles chronology
"Rainy Day" (2013)	"Singing Got Better" (2014)	"Don't Touch Me" (2014)

"Singing Got Better" (Korean: 노래가 늘었어; RR: Noraega Neureosseo) is a song by Korean-American singer Ailee. It was released for digital download and streaming through YMC Entertainment on January 6, 2014. Musically, "Singing Got Better" is an R&B and rock ballad that primarily utilizes piano and guitar instrumentations. Its subject matter revolves around the notion pushed by netizens that singers should settle down and forgo their careers once they become older; in the track, Ailee pushes her ideal instead.

Following the song's release, it was met with positive reception both commercially as well as from fellow celebrities in the music industry. It peaked at number one on the Gaon Digital Chart, becoming her second chart-topper following "U&I" the previous year. It sold over 1,240,000 digital units by the end of 2014, and was the 18th most-downloaded track of the year in South Korea.

== Background and music ==
"Singing Got Better" is a rock ballad that infuses elements of contemporary R&B, and utilizes instrumentations of piano and guitar.

== Reception ==
"Singing Got Better" experienced commercial success in South Korea upon its release. It opened at number one on the Gaon Digital Chart in the chart issue dated January 5–11, 2014. The following week, it descended to number three on the chart, and ranked at the same position on the monthly digital chart issue for January. By the end of the year, it garnered a total of 1,244,448 digital downloads, and was ranked the 18th best-selling single in the country during 2014. Factoring together digital downloads, streams, and instrumental track sales, "Singing Got Better" placed at number 36 on the year-end Gaon Digital Chart for 2014. The following year, the track received an additional 221,847 digital downloads according to the year-end issue for 2015, raising its cumulative sales figure to 1,466,295 units.

== Accolades ==
Awards and nominations
Year	Award	Category	Result
2014	Melon Music Awards	Best Ballad	Nominated
2014	Melon Music Awards	Song of the Year	Longlisted
2014	Mnet Asian Music Awards	Best Vocal Performance – Female	Won
2014	Mnet Asian Music Awards	UnionPay Song of the Year	Longlisted

Music program awards
Program	Date	Ref.
Show Champion (MBC M)	January 15, 2014	

== Charts ==
=== Weekly charts ===
Chart (2014)	Peak position
South Korea (Gaon)	1
South Korea (K-pop Hot 100)	3

=== Monthly charts ===
Chart (January 2014)	Peak position
South Korea (Gaon)	3

=== Year-end charts ===
Chart (2014)	Position
South Korea (Gaon)	36
