= A New Empire =

EP by Ailee
- Released: October 5, 2016
- Recorded: 2016
- Genres: K-pop; dance-pop; R&B
- Languages: Korean; English
- Labels: YMC Entertainment; LOEN Entertainment

Ailee chronology
| Vivid (2015) | A New Empire (2016) | Butterfly (2019) |

Singles from A New Empire
- 1. "If You" Released: August 23, 2016; 2. "Home" Released: October 05, 2016

A New Empire is the fourth extended play by South Korean singer Ailee. It was released on October 5, 2016, by YMC Entertainment and distributed by LOEN Entertainment.

== Background and release ==
On August 23, 2016, the digital song "If You" was pre-released, along with a music video for it.

On September 23, 2016, it was revealed that Ailee would make comeback in mid-October. On September 28, 2016, the trailer was released for the music video of song "Home" and it was announced that the album was to be released on October 5, 2016.

On October 5, 2016, the music video for "Home" and album were both released.

== Track listing ==
| No. | Title | Lyrics | Music | Arrangement | Length |
|---|---|---|---|---|---|
| 1. | "Home" (featuring Yoon Mi-rae) | Ailee; Yoon Mi-rae; Ha Hyung-joo; Heo Sung-jin | Kyung Ji-ae; Ha Hyung-joo; Heo Sung-jin | Heo Sung-jin | 3:50 |
| 2. | "까꿍" (English translation: Peekaboo) | Ailee; earattack | earattack | | 4:17 |
| 3. | "Feelin'" (featuring Eric Nam) | Ailee; Woozi | Ailee; Hymax; Hong Di; Famous Bro | | 3:13 |
| 4. | "Live or Die" (featuring Tak of Baechigi) | Ailee; Tak; Woozi; Moowoong | Ailee; Hymax; Hong Di; Famous Bro | | 3:02 |
| 5. | "I Need You" | Ailee; Ha Hyung-joo; Heo Sung-jin | Ha Hyung-joo; Heo Sung-jin | Ha Hyung-joo; Heo Sung-jin | 3:22 |
| 6. | "If You" | Choi Gab-won | Park Geun-tae; Choi Jin-seok | Park Geun-tae; Choi Jin-seok | 3:07 |
| Total length: | | | | | 20:51 |

== Charts ==
| Chart (2016) | Peak position |
|---|---|
| South Korean Albums (Gaon) | 10 |
| US World Albums (Billboard) | 9 |

== Release history ==
| Region | Date | Format | Label |
|---|---|---|---|
| Various | October 5, 2016 | Digital download | YMC Entertainment; LOEN Entertainment |
| South Korea | October 5, 2016 | CD, digital download | YMC Entertainment; LOEN Entertainment |
