= Heaven (Ailee song) =

- South Korean digital cover

Single by Ailee

from the album Invitation
- B-side: "Starlight" (JP ver.)
- Released: February 9, 2012; November 6, 2013 (JP)
- Genre: K-pop; R&B; dance
- Length: 3:38
- Label: YMC; Warner Music Japan
- Songwriter(s): Wheesung; Iggy; Seo Yong-bae
- Producer(s): Wheesung

Ailee singles chronology
"Heaven" (2012)	"I Will Show You" (2012)

Alternative Covers
- Japanese standard edition cover

Music video
- "Heaven" on YouTube

"Heaven" is the debut single by South Korean singer Ailee for her extended play Invitation (2012). Recorded in two languages (Korean and Japanese), the Korean version premiered as the lead single from the EP through YMC Entertainment on February 9, 2012, while the Japanese standalone CD single was released on November 6, 2013, via Warner Music Japan. An R&B, soul and dance number, the track was written and produced by Wheesung with additional songwriting contributions from Iggy and Seo Yong-bae.

Following its release, "Heaven" experienced commercial success in South Korea, peaking at number three on both the Gaon Digital Chart and Billboard K-pop Hot 100 chart. It garnered over 3,220,000 digital downloads in the country during 2012, and was the sixth most-downloaded single of the year. In contrast to its success in South Korea, however, "Heaven" performed rather moderately in Japan. The single peaked at number 24 on the Oricon Singles Chart and sold just over 4,000 physical copies in the country.

== Critical reception ==
Writing for music webzine IZM, Shin Hyun-tae praised Ailee's vocal abilities in the track and complimented her technique and charisma. Shin further wrote that the R&B dance song was reminiscent of works by Beyonce and Rihanna, with the "appealing voice, dreamy atmosphere, and magnificent development adding to the charm of the song." The publication included "Heaven" on their list of the best singles released during the year in South Korea; critic Eunji Yoon believed that the success of the song was purely the result of her strong vocal talent and skills, rather than relying on visual decorations that overwhelm the auditory sense or hailing from a major agency in the industry.

== Commercial performance ==
Commercially, "Heaven" experienced success in South Korea. In its debut week, the track opened at number 24 on the Gaon Digital Chart, and subsequently rose to number seven the following week. In its third charting week, the song peaked at the number three position on the digital chart. Throughout the rest of the year, "Heaven" garnered a cumulative total of 3,227,917 digital downloads in the country, and ranked as the sixth best-selling song of 2012 on the year-end download chart. Factoring together digital downloads, streaming figures, and instrumental track sales, the song ranked number nine on the year-end digital ranking for 2012.

== Music video and promotion ==
On February 6, the music video teaser for "Heaven" was released. Later that day, she made her debut stage performance on M Countdown, and subsequently appeared on Show! Music Core on February 11.

== Accolades ==
Awards and nominations
Year	Organization	Award	Result	Ref.
2012	Cyworld Digital Music Awards	Song of the Month (February)	Nominated	
2012	Cyworld Digital Music Awards	Rookie of the Month (February)	Won	
2012	Melon Music Awards	Best R&B/Ballad	Nominated	
2012	Melon Music Awards	Song of the Year	Longlisted	

== Track listing ==
Digital download / streaming – Korean

1. "Heaven" – 3:38

Japanese CD single

1. "Heaven" – 3:46
2. "Starlight" – 5:10
3. "Heaven" (Korean version) – 3:36
4. "Heaven" (Backing Track) – 3:44
5. "Starlight" (Backing Track) – 5:09

Limited edition DVD – Japanese

1. "Heaven" (Music video)
2. "Heaven" (Making)

== Charts ==
=== Weekly charts ===
Chart (2012–13)	Peak position
Japan Singles Chart (Oricon)	24
Japan (Japan Hot 100)	38
South Korea (Gaon)	3
South Korea (K-pop Hot 100)	3

=== Year-end charts ===
Chart (2012)	Position
South Korea (Gaon)	9
South Korea (K-pop Hot 100)	12

== Sales ==
Country	Sales
South Korea (digital)	3,227,917
Japan (physical)	4,226

== Release history ==
Region	Date	Format	Label	Ref.
South Korea	February 9, 2012	Digital download	YMC Entertainment	
Japan	November 6, 2013	CD (Standard edition)	Warner Music Japan	
Japan	November 6, 2013	CD + DVD (Limited edition)	Warner Music Japan	
Japan	November 6, 2013	Digital download	Warner Music Japan	
