= Invitation (EP) =

EP by Ailee
- Released: October 16, 2012
- Recorded: 2012
- Studios: YMC Studio, Seoul
- Genres: K-pop; dance-pop
- Length: 21:55
- Labels: YMC; LOEN
- Producer: Wheesung (executive)

Ailee chronology
Invitation (2012)	A's Doll House (2013)

Singles from Invitation
- 1. "Heaven" Released: February 9, 2012; 2. "I Will Show You" Released: October 16, 2012

Invitation is the debut extended play by Korean-American singer Ailee. It was released via YMC Entertainment on October 16, 2012. Two singles were promoted off of the EP: "Heaven" was released on February 9, 2012, while "I Will Show You" was released in conjunction with Invitation on October 16.

== Background and release ==
The mini album contains 6 tracks. Production of Invitation was handled by Kim Do-hoon, Lee Hyun-seung, Park Guen-tae, Duble Sidekick, Wheesung, and featured artists such as Verbal Jint, Swings and Simon D.

Commercially, Invitation peaked at number ten on the Gaon Album Chart and sold 10,555 copies by 2014. "I Will Show You" debuted at number six on South Korea's Gaon Digital Chart, before peaking at number three two weeks later. It additionally debuted at number two on the K-pop Hot 100, where it charted at for two consecutive weeks.

== Promotions and live performances ==
On February 6, the music video teaser for Ailee's debut song, "Heaven", was released. "Heaven" was written and produced by Wheesung. On February 9, Ailee released the song and the music video, which featured Beast's Lee Gi-kwang. Later that day, she made her debut stage performance of "Heaven" on M Countdown, and then on Show! Music Core on February 11.

On October 16, Ailee released her music video for her title track of the mini album, "I'll Show You", which featured MBLAQ's G.O. In addition to the music video, she also released her mini album called Invitation. On October 18, Ailee made her comeback with "I'll Show You" on M Countdown. On November 23, Ailee won her first music show award on Music Bank for "I'll Show You". On December 7, 2012, Ailee began follow up promotions with "Evening Sky" on Music Bank.

== Track listing ==
No.	Title	Writer(s)	Length
1.	"I Will Show You" (보여줄게; Boyeojulge)	Kim Do-hoon, Lee Hyun-seung	3:53
2.	"Into the Storm" ((폭풍속으로) feat. Verbal Jint)	Lee Hyun-seung, Duble Sidekick	3:31
3.	"Evening Sky" (저녁 하늘)	Park Geun-tae, Tommy Park	3:55
4.	"My Love" (feat. Swings)	Rado	3:35
5.	"Shut Up" (feat. Simon D)	Wheesung, Moon Ha	3:23
6.	"Heaven"	Wheesung, Iggy, Seo Yong-bae	3:38
Total length:			21:55

== Charts and sales ==
=== Album charts ===
Chart (2012)	Peak position
South Korean Weekly Albums (Gaon)	10
South Korean Monthly Albums (Gaon)	26

=== Sales ===
Chart	Sales
South Korea (Gaon)	10,555
