= Magazine (EP) =

EP by Ailee
- Released: September 25, 2014
- Recorded: 2014
- Studio: YMC Studio, Seoul
- Genre: K-pop; dance-pop; R&B
- Length: 17:43
- Label: YMC; Neowiz Internet
- Producer: Kim Do-hoon, Seo Jae-woo, Jakops, Gaeko

Ailee chronology
A's Doll House (2013)	Magazine (2014)	Vivid (2015)

Singles from Magazine
- 1. "Don't Touch Me" Released: September 25, 2014; 2. "Sudden Illness" Released: October 3, 2014; 3. "Goodbye Now" Released: October 15, 2014

"Magazine" is the third extended play by Korean American singer Ailee. It was released on September 25, 2014, by YMC Entertainment and Neowiz Internet. Magazine saw Ailee take greater creative control, co-writing four of the album's five songs, including the album's title track; Ailee also collaborated with long-time producer Kim Do-hoon and Korean rap twosome, Dynamic Duo. The song "Don't Touch Me" was used to promote the EP.

== Background and release ==
On September 15, 2014, it was revealed that Ailee will make her comeback on September 25 with her third EP Magazine. A teaser of the singer dressed as a clown with braided pigtails was released on the same day. The singer's agency also revealed that "Magazine" was an album that would present the singer in a matured light.

In preparation for the album, the singer revealed that she lost 10 kilograms in one month for the album. She stated further that her company did not force her to lose the weight and that they had pushed an originally-scheduled comeback for early 2015 to September 2014. During an interview with After School Club, Ailee revealed Magazine was the hardest she had ever worked on an album; she stated further that she conceptualized Magazine as a whole.

== Release ==
On September 21, Ailee released the music video teaser for the EP's title track "Don't Touch Me". Two days later on September 23, the EP's album cover was released. On September 25, 2014, Ailee released "Magazine", digitally, as well as the music video for "Don't Touch Me". A comeback showcase was organised for the release of the album at Ilchi Art Hall in Cheongdamdong, Gangnam. "Don't Touch Me" peaked at number two on the Gaon Digital Chart the week of September 27, 2014.

== Promotion ==
Promotions for the album started on September 25, on M Countdown. Ailee also promoted on Music Bank, Music Core and Show Champion, and Inkigayo in September and October. The singles "Sudden Illness" and "Goodbye Now" were also chosen to be part of her comeback performances.

== Track listing ==
No.	Title	Lyrics	Music	Length
1.	"손대지마" (Don't Touch Me)	Min Yun-jae, Jakops	Kim Do Hoon, Seo Jae-woo	3:25
2.	"미치지 않고서야" (Crazy) (with Dynamic Duo)	Gaeko, Choiza	Gaeko, 이병호	3:42
3.	"이제는 안녕" (Goodbye Now)	Ailee, Jakops	Jakops	3:38
4.	"문득병" (Sudden Illness)	Ailee, Jakops	Jakops, Ailee	2:59
5.	"Teardrop"	Ailee	귓방망이, Jakops	3:59
6.	"손대지마" (Don't Touch Me) (Inst.)		Kim Do Hoon, Seo Jae-woo	3:25
Total length:				17:43

== Accolades ==
Awards
Year	Organization	Nominated work	Category	Result	Ref.
2015	Golden Disk Awards	"Don't Touch Me"	Digital Bonsang	Won	

Music program awards
Song	Program	Date
"Don't Touch Me"	Inkigayo	October 5, 2014
"Don't Touch Me"	M Countdown	October 9, 2014
"Don't Touch Me"	Music Bank	October 10, 2014
"Don't Touch Me"	Show Champion	October 15, 2014

== Charts ==
Chart (2014)	Peak position
South Korean Weekly Albums (Gaon)	6
South Korean Monthly Albums (Gaon)	22

== Sales and certifications ==
Chart	Sales
South Korea (Gaon)	6,251

== Release history ==
Region	Date	Format	Label
Worldwide	September 25, 2014	Digital download	YMC Entertainment
South Korea	September 29, 2014	CD	YMC Entertainment, Neowiz
