= Showry =

South Korean comedian and vlogger

- 쇼리
- Born: Seo Ae-jin
- Years active: 2015–present

YouTube information
- Channel: Showry
- Years active: 2015
- Genre: Shock comedy
- Subscribers: 147 thousand
- Views: 54.7 million
- Last updated: Apr 15, 2026

Seo Ae-jin (Korean: 서애진), also known as Showry (쇼리), is a South Korean shock comedian and vlogger. With over one million viewers on her Facebook page, Showry parodies the Muk-bang trend during her YouTube videos.

Showry also creates YouTube comedy videos under the title "The Showry Show". As of January 2024, Showry has over 151 thousand subscribers and over 54.5 million views.
