= The Call (game show) =

Music collaboration project themed music variety game show on Mnet and tvN

- Promotional poster of S2
- Genre: Music variety game show
- Created by: Lee Seon-young
- Directed by: Lee Seon-young; Lee Chang-kyu; Oh Dae-won
- Presented by: Yoon Jong-shin; Yoon Min-soo; UV; Soyou; Kim Jong-kook (match-maker)
- Starring: Various artists
- Country of origin: South Korea
- Original language: Korean
- No. of seasons: 2
- No. of episodes: Special: 1; Regular: 18

Production
- Executive producer: Shin Eui-cheol
- Camera setup: Multicamera

Original release
- Network: Mnet
- Release: May 4, 2018 – September 6, 2019

The Call (Korean: 더 콜) is a music variety game show, originally airing on Mnet and simulcasted on tvN each Friday night, starting from May 4, 2018.

The show was created by South Korean television producer Lee Seon-young, who also created I Can See Your Voice, and focuses on getting Korean artists from various genres to collaborate in producing a new song.

The last episode of season 1 was aired on June 29, 2018, with a special episode airing on July 6, 2018.

The airing of season 2 started from July 5, 2019.

== Season 1 ==
The Call 1

Compilation album by Various artists
- Released: First Project; May 12, 2018; Second Project; May 19, 2018; Third Project; June 9, 2018; Fourth Project; June 22, 2018; Final Project; June 30, 2018
- Genre: Television's OST
- Length: 14:56 (first project); 15:15 (second project); 14:52 (third project); 17:38 (fourth project); 25:04 (final project)
- Language: Korean
- Label: Stone Music Entertainment

=== Cast ===
MCs

- Lee Sang-min
- Yoo Se-yoon

1st line up

- Shin Seung-hun
- Kim Jong-kook (Turbo)
- Kim Bum-soo
- Wheesung

2nd line up

- Hwang Chi-yeul
- Taeil (Block B)
- Ailee
- Bewhy
- Kim Chung-ha (hidden card, only performed in the second and final project)

3rd line up

- Hwanhee
- Gummy
- UV (member Yoo Se-yoon is also the show host)
- Crush

4th line up

- Jung-in
- Taemin (Shinee)
- Loco & Gray
- Suran
- Eddy Kim

=== Groups ===
In the "Love Call" at the project's beginning, a new group is formed if there is a "two-way call" between an initial group and an additional singer. After this part,

- If there is still an unestablished group (because of "one-way call" or "no call" between them), they will be forced to become a new group with the remaining additional singer.
- If there are still more than two groups, they have to re-group with the remaining additional singers in the "Last Call" just after that, with the same method as the "Love Call".

After the collaborative stages, the audiences will pick a team as "Best Couple" based on their performance. The audiences will also pick a "Team You Want to See Again" (only appeared in the first project) which will directly become a new group for the next project without having to participate in the "Last Call". Other singers have to participate in the "Last Call" to form the new groups for the next project.

– Best Couple (picked by the audiences)

Episode #	Project #	Initial group	Additional singer	Grouping before the main performance		Performance team	Grouping after the main performance		References
Episode #	Project #	Initial group	Additional singer	"Love Call"	"Last Call" (if any)	Performance team	"Team You Want to See Again" (picked by the audiences)	"Last Call"	References
1–2	1	Shin Seung-hun	Hwang Chi-yeul, Taeil, Ailee, BewhY	Shin Seung-hun, Ailee	—N/a	Shin Seung-hun & Ailee	Shin Seung-hun & BewhY	Kim Jong-kook & Hwang Chi-yeul (two-way); Wheesung & Taeil (two-way); Kim Bum-soo & Ailee (no call between them)	
1–2	1	Kim Jong-kook	Hwang Chi-yeul, Taeil, Ailee, BewhY	Kim Jong-kook, Taeil	—N/a	Kim Jong-kook & Taeil	Shin Seung-hun & BewhY	Kim Jong-kook & Hwang Chi-yeul (two-way); Wheesung & Taeil (two-way); Kim Bum-soo & Ailee (no call between them)	
1–2	1	Kim Bum-soo	Hwang Chi-yeul, Taeil, Ailee, BewhY	Kim Bum-soo, BewhY	—N/a	Kim Bum-soo & BewhY	Shin Seung-hun & BewhY	Kim Jong-kook & Hwang Chi-yeul (two-way); Wheesung & Taeil (two-way); Kim Bum-soo & Ailee (no call between them)	
1–2	1	Wheesung	Hwang Chi-yeul, Taeil, Ailee, BewhY	Wheesung, Hwang Chi-yeul (one-way from Wheesung)	—N/a	Wheesung & Hwang Chi-yeul	Shin Seung-hun & BewhY	Kim Jong-kook & Hwang Chi-yeul (two-way); Wheesung & Taeil (two-way); Kim Bum-soo & Ailee (no call between them)	
3	2	Shin Seung-hun, BewhY	Chungha	—N/a		Shin Seung-hun & BewhY	—N/a	Shin Seung-hun & BewhY (two-way); Kim Bum-soo & Taeil (two-way); Wheesung & Ailee (two-way); Kim Jong-kook & Hwang Chi-yeul (no call between them)	
3	2	Kim Jong-kook, Hwang Chi-yeul	Chungha	—N/a		Kim Jong-kook & Hwang Chi-yeul	—N/a	Shin Seung-hun & BewhY (two-way); Kim Bum-soo & Taeil (two-way); Wheesung & Ailee (two-way); Kim Jong-kook & Hwang Chi-yeul (no call between them)	
3	2	Kim Bum-soo, Ailee	Chungha	—N/a		Kim Bum-soo & Ailee	—N/a	Shin Seung-hun & BewhY (two-way); Kim Bum-soo & Taeil (two-way); Wheesung & Ailee (two-way); Kim Jong-kook & Hwang Chi-yeul (no call between them)	
3	2	Wheesung, Taeil	Chungha	Wheesung, Taeil, Chungha	—N/a	Wheesung & Taeil & Chungha	—N/a	Shin Seung-hun & BewhY (two-way); Kim Bum-soo & Taeil (two-way); Wheesung & Ailee (two-way); Kim Jong-kook & Hwang Chi-yeul (no call between them)	
4–5	3	Shin Seung-hun, BewhY	Hwanhee, Gummy, UV, Crush	Shin Seung-hun, BewhY, Crush	—N/a	Bewhy & Crush	—N/a		
4–5	3	Kim Jong-kook, Hwang Chi-yeul	Hwanhee, Gummy, UV, Crush	Kim Jong-kook, Hwang Chi-yeul, UV	—N/a	Kim Jong-kook & UV	—N/a		
4–5	3	Kim Bum-soo, Taeil	Hwanhee, Gummy, UV, Crush	(no call between them)	Kim Bum-soo, Taeil, Hwanhee (one-way from Taeil)	Hwanhee & Taeil	—N/a		
4–5	3	Wheesung, Ailee	Hwanhee, Gummy, UV, Crush	(no call between them)	Wheesung, Ailee, Gummy	Gummy & Ailee	—N/a		
6–7	4	Shin Seung-hun, BewhY, Crush	Jung-in, Taemin, Loco & Gray, Suran, Eddy Kim	Shin Seung-hun, BewhY, Crush, Taemin, Eddy Kim	—N/a	BewhY & Taemin	—N/a		
6–7	4	Shin Seung-hun, BewhY, Crush	Jung-in, Taemin, Loco & Gray, Suran, Eddy Kim	Shin Seung-hun, BewhY, Crush, Taemin, Eddy Kim	—N/a	Shin Seung-hun & Eddy Kim	—N/a		
6–7	4	Kim Jong-kook, Hwang Chi-yeul, UV	Jung-in, Taemin, Loco & Gray, Suran, Eddy Kim	Kim Jong-kook, Hwang Chi-yeul, UV, Loco & Gray	—N/a	Kim Jong-kook & Hwang Chi-yeul & UV & Loco & Gray	—N/a		
6–7	4	Kim Bum-soo, Taeil, Hwanhee	Jung-in, Taemin, Loco & Gray, Suran, Eddy Kim	Kim Bum-soo, Taeil, Hwanhee, Suran	—N/a	Kim Bum-soo & Suran	—N/a		
6–7	4	Wheesung, Gummy, Ailee	Jung-in, Taemin, Loco & Gray, Suran, Eddy Kim	Wheesung, Gummy, Ailee, Jung-in	—N/a	Gummy & Ailee & Jung-in	—N/a		
8	5 (Final)	Loco & Gray & Suran & Eddy Kim					—N/a		
8	5 (Final)	Jung-in & Gummy					—N/a		
8	5 (Final)	UV & Taemin					—N/a		
8	5 (Final)	Taeil & Ailee & BewhY					—N/a		
8	5 (Final)	Wheesung & Hwanhee					—N/a		
8	5 (Final)	The Call artists					—N/a		

=== Projects ===
Project #	Broadcast date (Project album's release date)	Project Theme	Stage #	Team	Song				References
Project #	Broadcast date (Project album's release date)	Project Theme	Stage #	Team	Title	Lyrics	Music	Arranger	References
1	May 11, 2018 (May 12, 2018)	Answer or Another Story (답가 또는 Another Story)	1	Be Bomb (Kim Bum-soo & BewhY)	"I Will Be"	Kim Bum-soo, BewhY	Joker, Kim Bum-soo, BewhY	Joker	
1	May 11, 2018 (May 12, 2018)	Answer or Another Story (답가 또는 Another Story)	2	Smilling (Wheesung & Hwang Chi-yeul)	"Single Life"	Wheesung (Realslow)	Wheesung (Realslow), ANTIK, Chae Tae-sik		
1	May 11, 2018 (May 12, 2018)	Answer or Another Story (답가 또는 Another Story)	3	Voice for Men (Kim Jong-kook & Taeil)	"Monologue" (혼잣말)	EDEN	EDEN, BUDDY		
1	May 11, 2018 (May 12, 2018)	Answer or Another Story (답가 또는 Another Story)	4	Voice to God (Shin Seung-hun & Ailee)	"Fly Away"	Kim Eana	Shin Seung-hun, Jay Lee		
2	May 18, 2018 (May 19, 2018)	This Moment, This Song (이 순간 이 노래)	1	Ilee with Bumsoo (Kim Bum-soo & Ailee)	"Fall Away"	Postino, Kim Bum-soo, H.H	Postino, Kim Bum-soo	Postino	
2	May 18, 2018 (May 19, 2018)	This Moment, This Song (이 순간 이 노래)	2	Blue-star-1 (Wheesung & Taeil & Chungha)	"Rainy Day"	Wheesung (Realslow)		PJT, Wheesung (Realslow)	
2	May 18, 2018 (May 19, 2018)	This Moment, This Song (이 순간 이 노래)	3	Men's Spring (Kim Jong-kook & Hwang Chi-yeul)	"Miracle of 1%" (1퍼센트의 기적이라)	Oh Sung-hoon, Kim Jong-kook, Kim Sung-tae	Oh Sung-hoon	Oh Sung-hoon, Park Ga-young	
2	May 18, 2018 (May 19, 2018)	This Moment, This Song (이 순간 이 노래)	4	ShinBe (Shin Seung-hun & BewhY)	"Lullaby" (자장가)	Kim Eana, BewhY	Shin Seung-hun	Shin Seung-hun, Jay Lee, Oviz	
3	June 8, 2018 (June 9, 2018)	Temperature of Love (사랑의 온도)	1	Alien in the Spiderweb (Gummy & Ailee)	"Jealousy" (질투나)	Duble Sidekick, Ailee, Chancellor	Duble Sidekick, Ailee, Chancellor, WiiKEED	WiiKEED	
3	June 8, 2018 (June 9, 2018)	Temperature of Love (사랑의 온도)	2	HwangTae (Hwanhee & Taeil)	"Fever" (열병)	XYZ (UNFAIR, Shin Na-ra, Yang Hyun-mo, Baek Woo-bin)			
3	June 8, 2018 (June 9, 2018)	Temperature of Love (사랑의 온도)	3	Brushin' (BewhY & Crush)	"0–100"	Crush, BewhY			
3	June 8, 2018 (June 9, 2018)	Temperature of Love (사랑의 온도)	4	TouchU (Kim Jong-kook & UV)	"Pull Up" (풀어)	Muzie, Yoo Se-yoon, Kim Jong-kook	Muzie, Yoo Se-yoon, Yoo Joon-sung	Muzie, Yoo Joon-sung	
4	June 22, 2018 (June 22, 2018)	Retro (레트로)	1	SIH (Sisters in Hamony) (Jung-in & Gummy & Ailee)	"Call My Name"	Jeon Sang-hwan, Gummy, Ailee, B2J, Im Hyo-jin	Jeon Sang-hwan, Oktavian, Melody Noel Hernandez, OMEGA	Jeon Sang-hwan, JET Park	
4	June 22, 2018 (June 22, 2018)	Retro (레트로)	2	BewhY & Taemin	"Pinocchio" (피노키오)	JQ, Kim Jin, Mola (Makeumine Works), BewhY, Taemin	Bram Inscore, OMEGA, Felix Sandman, Victoria Zaro, Zac Poor	Bram Inscore, OMEGA	
4	June 22, 2018 (June 22, 2018)	Retro (레트로)	3	TouchU Log in (Kim Jong-kook & Hwang Chi-yeul & UV & Loco & Gray)	"All 2 U" (아깝지 않아)	Loco, Gray, Jay Park	Gray, Jay Park	Gray, Band Workmanship	
4	June 22, 2018 (June 22, 2018)	Retro (레트로)	4	Shin Seung-hun & Eddy Kim	"Super Star" (슈퍼스타)	Kim Eana	Shin Seung-hun, Jay Lee		
4	June 22, 2018 (June 22, 2018)	Retro (레트로)	5	Kim Bum-soo & Suran	"Groggy" (꾸러기)	Suran, Acserum	Suran, Minje, Eastwest, Kim Bum-soo	Suran, Eastwest	
5 (Final)	June 29, 2018 (June 30, 2018)	(None)	1	Loco & Gray & Suran & Eddy Kim	"Some More" (썸머)	Loco, Gray, Suran, Eddy Kim		Gray, Eddy Kim	
5 (Final)	June 29, 2018 (June 30, 2018)	(None)	2	Jung-in & Gummy	"Hot Friend"	Jeon Sang-hwan, B2J, Im Hyo-jin	Jeon Sang-hwan, Oktavian, April Bender, Leyla Blue	Jeon Sang-hwan, Oktavian	
5 (Final)	June 29, 2018 (June 30, 2018)	(None)	3	UV & Taemin	"You Are My Standard" (니가 내 기준)	Muzie, Yoo Se-yoon		Muzie, Go Tae-young	
5 (Final)	June 29, 2018 (June 30, 2018)	(None)	4	Taeil & Ailee & BewhY	"Duty Free"	Ailee, Taeil, BewhY	Famousbro, HYMAX, Seo Ji-eun, Ailee	Famousbro, HYMAX, Seo Ji-eun	
5 (Final)	June 29, 2018 (June 30, 2018)	(None)	5	Wheesung & Hwanhee	"MoonNight Blues"	Wheesung (Realslow)	Wheesung (Realslow), PJT		
5 (Final)	June 29, 2018 (June 30, 2018)	(None)	6	The Call artists	"Remember"	Kim Eana, BewhY	Shin Seung-hun	Jung Soo-min	

== Season 2 ==
The Call 2

Compilation album by Various artists
- Released: First Project; July 13, 2019; Second Project; August 3, 2019; Third Project; August 17, 2019; Fourth Project; August 31, 2019
- Genre: Television's OST
- Length: 17:19 (first project); 13:49 (second project); 20:21 (third project); 17:57 (fourth project)
- Language: Korean
- Label: Stone Music Entertainment

=== Cast ===
MCs

- Yoon Jong-shin
- Yoon Min-soo (Vibe)
- UV
- Soyou
- Kim Jong-kook (match-maker)

1st line up

- Tiger JK & Bizzy
- Noel
- Cheetah
- N.Flying

2nd line up

- Ha Dong-kyun
- Lyn
- Hwang Chi-yeul
- Kim Feel
- DinDin

3rd line up

- Kim Hyun-chul
- Yubin
- Hangzoo (Rhythm Power)
- Hui (Pentagon)
- Hong Ja

Final line up

- Song Ga-in
- Baekho (NU'EST)
- Parc Jae-jung

== Ratings ==
In the table below, the blue numbers represent the lowest ratings and the red numbers represent the highest ratings.

=== Season 1 ===
List of ratings in season 1 (8 episodes)

Episode #	Broadcast Date	Mnet		tvN	
Episode #	Broadcast Date	AGB Ratings	TNmS Ratings	AGB Ratings	TNmS Ratings
1	May 4, 2018	0.4%	0.2%	1.854%	1.7%
2	May 11, 2018	0.6%	0.4%	1.388%	1.3%
3	May 18, 2018	0.5%	0.5%	1.508%	1.6%
4	May 25, 2018	0.6%	0.4%	2.032%	1.7%
—	June 1, 2018	A special episode was aired instead of a regular broadcast due to the funeral of Wheesung's father.			
5	June 8, 2018	0.6%	—	1.662%	—
6	June 15, 2018	0.6%	—	1.578%	—
7	June 22, 2018	0.5%	—	1.729%	—
8	June 29, 2018	0.3%	—	1.529%	—

=== Season 2 ===
List of ratings in season 2 (10 episodes)

Episode #	Broadcast Date	Mnet	tvN	
Episode #	Broadcast Date	AGB Ratings (Nationwide)	AGB Ratings (Nationwide)	AGB Ratings (Seoul Capital Area)
1	July 5, 2019	0.4%	1.3%	1.637%
2	July 12, 2019	0.3%	1.0%	1.177%
3	July 26, 2019	0.5%	1.4%	1.363%
4	August 2, 2019	0.2%	1.4%	1.532%
5	August 9, 2019	0.3%	1.277%	1.742%
6	August 16, 2019	0.3%	1.1%	—
7	August 23, 2019	0.3%	1.3%	—
8	August 30, 2019	0.4%	1.619%	2.118%
9	September 6, 2019	0.8%	1.3%	—
10	September 13, 2019	0.4%	1.4%	—

Note: This program airs on a cable channel/pay TV which normally has a relatively smaller audience compared to free-to-air TV/public broadcasters (KBS, SBS, MBC and EBS).
