= Lovin' (EP) =

- Digital cover

EP by Ailee
- Released: May 7, 2021
- Genre: R&B
- Length: 19:58
- Language: Korean
- Label: Rocket3 Entertainment; Dreamus

Ailee chronology
I'm (2020)	Lovin' (2021)	Amy (2021)

Singles from Lovin'
- 1. "Make Up Your Mind" Released: May 7, 2021; 2. "Spring Flowers" Released: May 7, 2021

Lovin' is the sixth extended play by South Korean singer Ailee. It was released by Rocket3 Entertainment on May 7, 2021, and consists of six tracks, including two lead singles "Make Up Your Mind" and "Spring Flowers".

== Background and release ==
On April 16, 2021, Rocket3 Entertainment announced that Ailee would be releasing an extended play in May ahead of her third studio album. On April 23, the track listing was released, followed by the teaser video for "Make Up Your Mind" on April 30, which featured actor Park Eun-seok. On May 4, the teaser audio for "Make Up Your Mind" was released. On May 7, the extended play was released.

== Composition ==
The extended play contains two lead singles. The first, "Make Up Your Mind", is described as a song that expresses the excitement of new couple who just started a relationship. The second, "Spring Flowers", is described as song that compares fans and those whom can't meet for a quite some time to the flowers which bloom in spring.

== Commercial performance ==
Lovin' debuted at position 91 on South Korea's Gaon Album Chart in the chart issue dated May 9–15, 2021. The extended play then ascended to position 64 in the chart issue dated May 16–22, 2021.

== Track listing ==
Track listing for Lovin'
No.	Title	Lyrics	Music	Arrangement	Length
1.	"Tattoo"	Ailee; Min Yeon-jae; Lim Soo-ran (Lalala Studio); Lee Hyo-jae (Lalala Studio); Mok Ji-min	James Barr; Rachel Barror		3:19
2.	"Make Up Your Mind"	Ailee; Yong Hee	Ollipop; Haley Aitken; Gavin Jones; Naitumela Masuku	Ollipop	3:23
3.	"525"	Ailee; Kang Eun-jung; JQ; Ah Mel-ri; Mola (makeumine works); Park Jung-hwan	Min Ji-syeon (minGtion); Cazzi Opeia; Ellen Berg	Min Ji-syeon (minGtion)	3:15
4.	"Lose Myself to You"	Ailee; Jeong Chil-li (FlyingLab)	Christian Fast; Malin Johansson; Marcus Tikkanen; Niko Mansikka-aho	Marcus Tikkanen; Niko Strawberry-aho	2:59
5.	"Ain't Talkin' About Me"	Ailee; Kim Chan (FlyingLab)	Christian Fast; Yaroslav Polikarpov; Malin Johansson	Yaroslav Polikarpov	3:23
6.	"Spring Flowers" (봄꽃)	Ailee; earattack	earattack	earattack	3:36
Total length:					19:58

== Charts ==
Chart performance for Lovin'
Chart (2021)	Peak position
South Korean Albums (Gaon)	64

== Release history ==
Release history for Lovin'
Region	Date	Format	Label
Various	May 7, 2021	Digital download; streaming	Rocket3 Entertainment; Dreamus
South Korea	May 7, 2021	CD	Rocket3 Entertainment; Dreamus
