= Vivid (Ailee album) =

Studio album by Ailee
- Released: September 30, 2015
- Recorded: 2014–2015
- Genre: Pop; R&B
- Language: Korean; English
- Label: YMC Entertainment; LOEN Entertainment

Ailee chronology
Magazine (2014)	Vivid (2015)	A New Empire (2016)

Singles from Vivid
- 1. "Mind Your Own Business" Released: September 30, 2015; 2. "Insane" Released: October 1, 2015

Vivid is the debut studio album by South Korean singer Ailee. It was released on September 30, 2015, by YMC Entertainment and distributed by LOEN Entertainment.

== Background and release ==
On September 21, 2015, it was revealed that Ailee would release her first full album on September 30, titled Vivid. The title track of the album was revealed to be "Mind Your Own Business". On September 22, the first music video teaser for "Mind Your Own Business" was released. On September 24, 2015, Ailee released the album's tracklist and album jacket cover. On September 29, 2015, the music video for "Mind Your Own Business" was released. The music video for the second single, "Insane" was released on October 1, 2015.

== Promotions ==
Ailee had her comeback stage on M! Countdown on October 1, following performances on Music Bank, Show! Music Core, Inkigayo and Show Champion. Besides "Mind Your Own Business", she performed the tracks, "Insane" and "How Can Someone Be This Way". She won her first trophy for promotions of this album on Show Champion on October 7, 2015.

== Track listing ==
Vivid
No.	Title	Writer(s)	Producer(s)	Length
1.	"Mind Your Own Business" (너나 잘해)	Duble Sidekick; Long Candy	Duble Sidekick; Long Candy; Eastwest	3:25
2.	"Insane"	Ailee	Ailee; 양갱	3:29
3.	"I Love You, I Hate You" (미워도 사랑해)	Duble Sidekick; Long Candy	Duble Sidekick; Long Candy; the channels	3:50
4.	"Second Chance"	Ryosuke Imai; Gabriella Ellis; Ailee	Ryosuke Imai; Gabriella Ellis	3:17
5.	"Symphony" (featuring Chancellor)	Ailee; Park Jang-geun	Ailee; Chancellor; 양갱	3:16
6.	"How Can Someone Be This Way" (사람이 왜 그래)	귓방망이; Ailee	귓방망이; Ailee	3:44
7.	"Letting Go" (featuring Amber J. Liu)	Liu; Sean Alexander; Ailee	Liu; Alexander; Ailee	3:34
8.	"Love Recipe"	Heo Sung-jin	Ha Hyung-joo; Heo Sung-jin	3:25
9.	"Filling Up My Glass" (잔을 채우고)	Lee Jong-hyun; Ailee	Lee Jong-hyun; Park Eun-ooh	3:51
10.	"One Step Closer" (한걸음 더)	Fredro; Uta; Ryosuke Imai; Stef Lang; Ailee	Fredro; Uta; Ryosuke Imai; Stef Lang	3:16
Total length:				35:13

== Charts ==
Chart (2015)	Peak position
Korean Albums (Gaon)	7
US World Albums (Billboard)	6

== Release history ==
Region	Date	Format	Label
Various	September 30, 2015	Digital download	YMC Entertainment; LOEN Entertainment
South Korea	September 30, 2015	CD, digital download	YMC Entertainment; LOEN Entertainment
