= Ailee =

American singer (born 1989)

- Ailee in 2026
- Born: Amy Lee; May 30, 1989 (age 37); Denver, Colorado, U.S.
- Occupations: Singer; songwriter
- Spouse: Choi Si-hun (m. 2024)
- Musical career
- Genres: K-pop; pop; R&B; ballad
- Instrument: Vocals
- Years active: 2012–present
- Labels: Muzo; YMC; JSJ; Warner Japan; WestSide; Rocket3; The L1ve; Pop Music

Korean name
- Hangul: 이예진
- RR: I Yejin
- MR: I Yejin
- Website: ailee.bstage.in

Signature
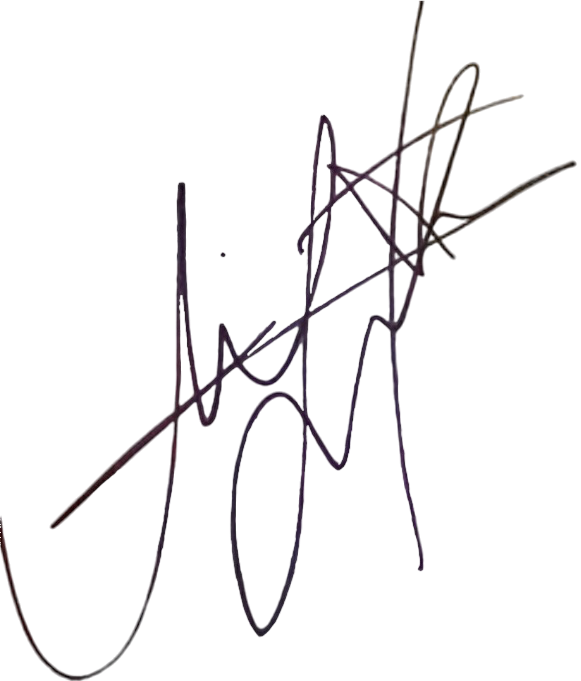

Amy Lee (born May 30, 1989), known professionally as Ailee (에일리), is an American singer and songwriter based in South Korea. Amassing digital sales success in South Korea, she has released four studio albums, six extended plays, and twenty one singles, six of which charted within the top five of the Gaon Digital Chart.

She debuted in 2012 with her first single "Heaven", which peaked at number three on the Gaon Digital Chart and earned her Best New Artist Awards at the Melon Music Awards, Golden Disc Awards, Gaon Chart K-Pop Awards, and Seoul Music Awards. She won four consecutive Mnet Asian Music Award for Best Female Vocal Performance titles from 2013 to 2016, with "U&I", "Singing Got Better", "Mind Your Own Business", and "If You" respectively. Her 2017 single, "I Will Go to You Like the First Snow", recorded for the soundtrack of the television drama series Guardian: The Lonely and Great God (2016), won several awards and was the most digitally successful song of that year, becoming the best-selling record in movies and dramas in the Korean sound record market.

== Early life and education ==
Ailee was born in Denver, Colorado, on May 30, 1989, and grew up in New Jersey. She attended Palisades Park High School before moving to nearby Leonia. After her Scotch Plains-Fanwood High School graduation, she studied communications at Pace University before dropping out to pursue a career in music.

== Career ==
=== 2010–2011: Career beginnings ===
Before her K-pop debut, Ailee was signed under Muzo Entertainment, an independent agency in New York City and New Jersey. Under that label she collaborated with several artists, including Johnnyphlo and rapper Decipher. Before moving to South Korea, Ailee created the YouTube channels "mzamyx3" and "aileemusic" to bring attention to her singing on the web.

Ailee moved to South Korea in 2010 after she landed a music label audition through her uncle's connections. She sang "Resignation" by Big Mama during the audition and was recruited for YMC Entertainment on the spot. During her training, YMC featured her in the label's Wheesung song, "They Are Coming", which was released in October 2011. She also sang in Decipher and Jay Park's song "Catch Me If You Can". In September 2011, Ailee and Wheesung were featured on the MBC's Chuseok special episode of Singer and Trainee. Ailee performed "Halo" by Beyoncé to a positive reaction from the audience. Following her performance of "Halo", judge BMK said, "Wherever she goes, she has the potential to be a big star. She definitely has the voice." After the judges had graded all the participants, Ailee was the first-place winner.

=== 2012: Debut and commercial success ===
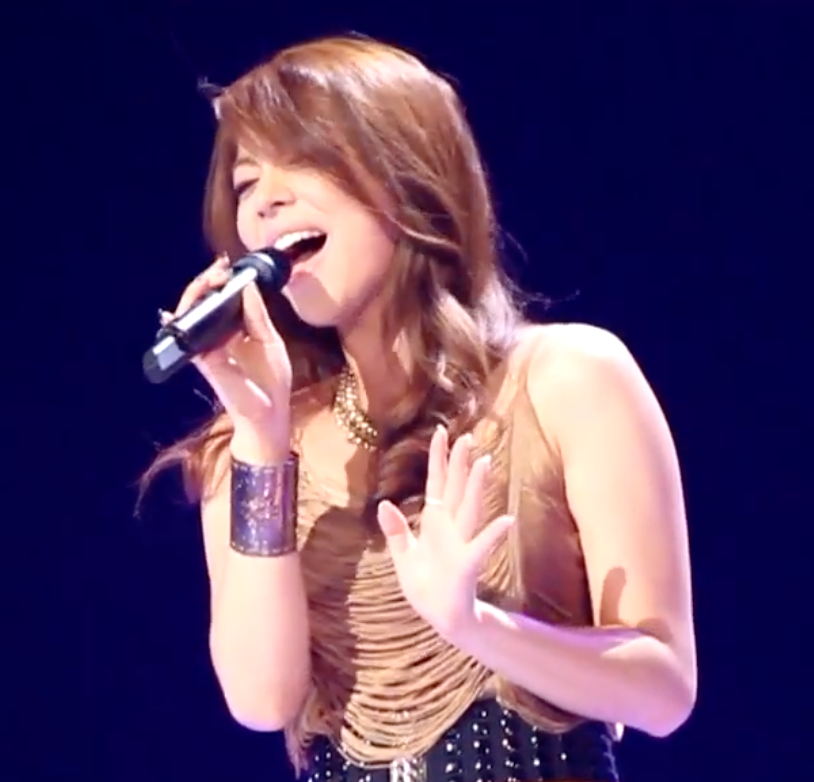
Ailee performing in July 2012

On February 9, 2012, Ailee released her debut single "Heaven" along with the music video, which featured Gi Kwang of Beast. On the same day, she made her debut stage performance of "Heaven" on M Countdown. Billboard commented, "From her debut single, Ailee proved that she had an ability beyond her years to communicate the deeper experiences one feels in love. In this dedication track, Ailee's partner protected her and taught her how to love in a harsh world." The success of the single helped Ailee win her first award at the 2012 Cyworld Digital Music Awards. The single received the Song of the month (February) and Rookie of the month at the award ceremony.

On October 16, 2012, Ailee released her debut EP, Invitation, with the title track "I Will Show You". The EP contained a total of six tracks. It was produced by producers such as Kim Do-hoon, Lee Hyun-seung, Park Guen-tae, Duble Sidekick, Wheesung, and featured artists such as Verbal Jint, Swings and Simon Dominic.

In 2012, Ailee was awarded the Best New Artist Award at the Seoul Music Awards, Melon Music Awards, Mnet Asian Music Awards, and Golden Disk Awards, as well as the New Female Solo Artist Award at the Gaon Chart Music Awards. She has also received the Mnet America Rising Star Award, a special award presented by Mnet America at the pre-show of 55th Grammy Awards.

=== 2013–2014: Commercial popularity ===
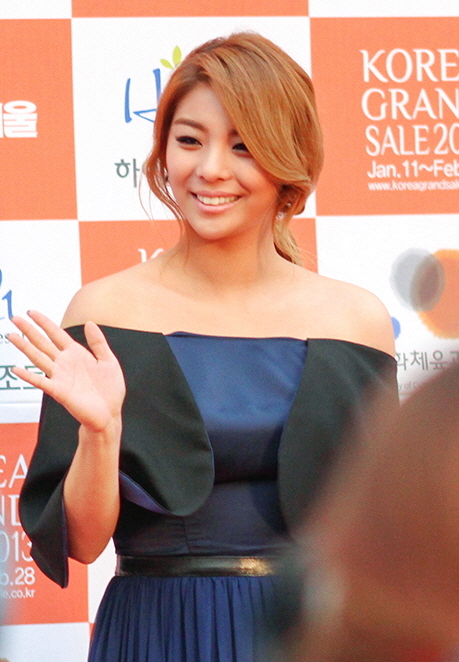
Ailee at the 22nd Seoul Music Awards, where she received the award for Best New Artist.

On July 12, 2013, Ailee released her second Ep, titled A's Doll House. The EP's title track, "U&I" topped various music charts within four hours of release. On November 6, 2013, Ailee made her Japanese debut with Japanese-version of "Heaven" and "Starlight" under Warner Music Japan.

On January 6, 2014, Ailee released a single titled "Singing Got Better", produced by Wheesung. The song peaked at number one upon released on various music chart. The single has received the Best Vocal Performance at the 2014 Mnet Asian Music Awards. On September 25, 2014, Ailee released her third EP, titled Magazine. The EP's title track, "Don't Touch Me" peaked at number one upon released on various music chart. The single received the Digital Bonsang at the 2015 Golden Disc Awards.

=== 2015–2016: Breakthrough with Vivid ===
After wrapping up her joint Unite the Mic Tour with Jay Park and San E in Toronto in March 2015, plans were revealed for Ailee to hold a solo concert three years after her debut. Her first solo concert, titled Fatal Attraction, was held on July 4, 2015, at the Olympic Hall. Ailee was joined on stage several times by different artists who helped her sing her many duets and collaborations. She sang "Shut Up" with Showry, "Like Nobody Knows" and "Comma 07" with Cheetah, "Wash Away" and "Officially Missing You" with Geeks, "NimA" and "Shower of Tears" with Baechigi, and "Touch My Body" and "Let"s Go Travel" with Shin Bo-ra.

Ailee's first full-length album Vivid was released on September 30, 2015. She won her first trophy for this promotion on October 7, 2015, on Show Champion. Ailee was awarded the Best Female Vocal Award for the third consecutive year at the 2015 Mnet Asian Music Awards, for "Mind Your Own Business".

On July 13, 2016, Ailee was confirmed to participate as a judge on Superstar K 2016. On August 23, 2016, Ailee released her single "If You", which subsequently topped the Gaon Weekly Chart for Digital Download. On October 5, 2016, Ailee released her EP A New Empire, along with the music video for "Home" that was officially released on LOEN and YMC Entertainment's official YouTube channel. A New Empire peaked at number 10 on the Gaon Album Chart, and number nine on the US World Albums (Billboard) Chart. On December 2, 2016, Ailee was again awarded with Best Vocal Performance at the 2016 Mnet Asian Music Awards, this time for "If You", a record-breaking fourth consecutive win in the category.

=== 2017–2018: OST success and solo concert tours ===
On January 7, 2017, Ailee released her debut American single "Fall Back" through WestSide Entertainment under the alias A.Leean. She also released the ballad "I Will Go to You Like the First Snow" (첫눈처럼 너에게 가겠다) on the same day as part nine in a series composed of singles for the South Korean cable television series Guardian: The Lonely and Great God. The single topped the Gaon Digital Chart for three consecutive weeks. The single earned Ailee the Best OST Award at the 2017 Korea Cable TV Awards. The soundtrack has also received several accolades, including the best original soundtrack award at the Seoul International Drama Awards, the Mnet Asian Music Awards, the Melon Music Awards, the Seoul Music Awards and the Golden Disc Awards.

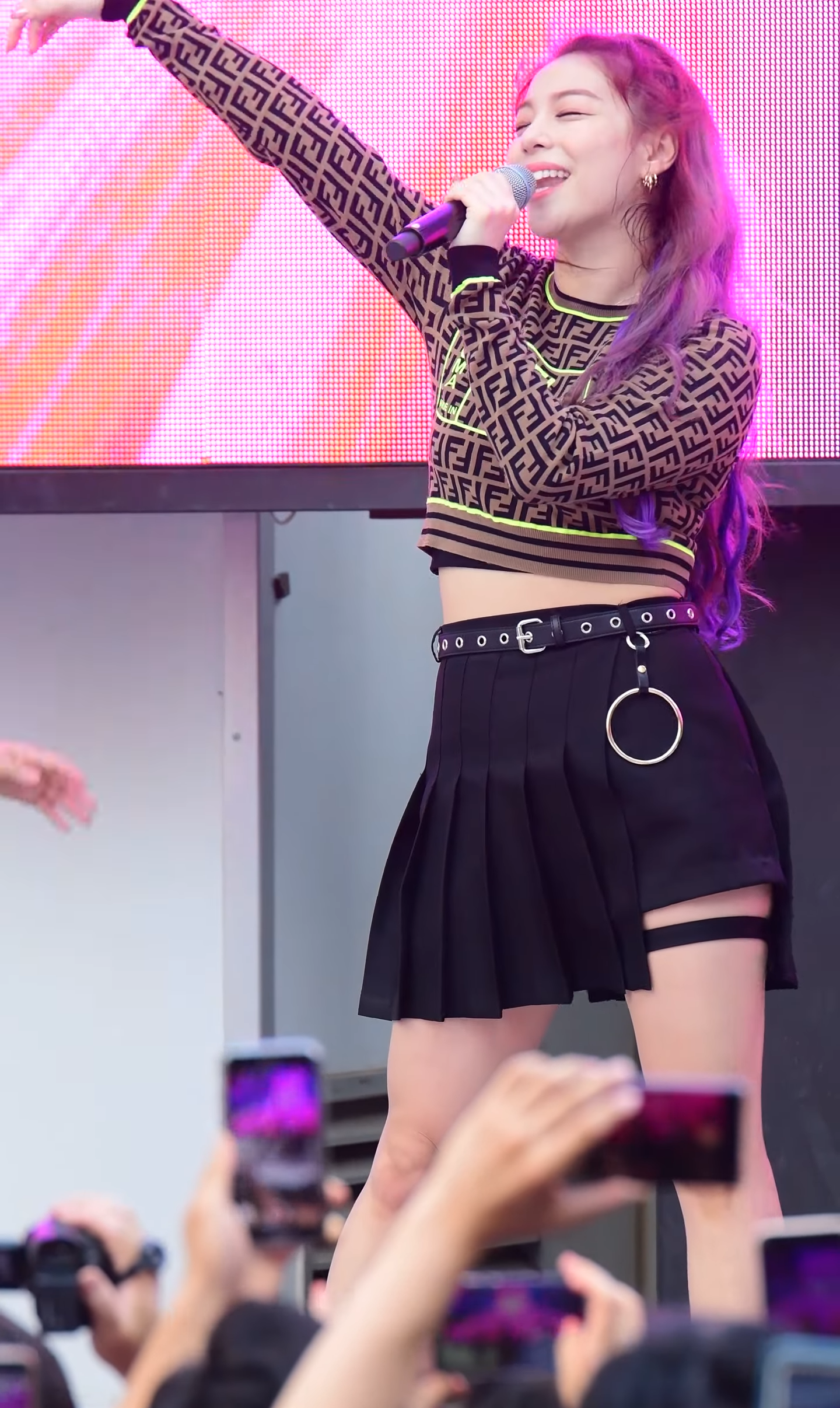
Ailee busking in Myeongdong, July 2019

Ailee previously held two Christmas concerts in Seoul titled Welcome Home at Kyunghee University's Grand Peace Palace on December 24–25, 2016. Due to the success of the concerts, it was announced that Ailee would be holding her first nationwide tour, titled Welcome Home Tour, which started in Daegu on April 1, 2017. On June 25, 2017, in The City Hall at Taipei International Convention Center, Ailee held her first solo concert in Taiwan titled Ailee – Hello Taipei 2017. On November 18 and 19, Ailee held two concerts at the Pechanga Theater in California, selling out a total of 2,600 tickets combined.

On March 18, 2018, Ailee performed "I Will Show You" at the closing ceremony of the 2018 Paralympic Winter Games at the Pyeongchang Olympic Stadium. On September 14, 2018, Ailee was chosen as a member of the South Korean cultural delegation, alongside other selected South Korean artists, for the third inter-Korean summit in Pyongyang, North Korea, where she performed her OST "I Will Go to You Like the First Snow". On November 23, 2018, Ailee announced her second nationwide tour, titled I Am: Ailee.

=== 2019–2023: Album releases continued touring ===
Ailee released her second studio album, titled Butterfly, on July 2, 2019, with the lead single "Room Shaker". On September 10, 2019, Ailee announced on Instagram that she started a new company named, "Rocket3 Entertainment" after being signed with YMC Entertainment for eight years. On December 13, 2019, Ailee released her first English language single under American label, Sun and Sky Records. The single, entitled "Sweater", was hailed as "a heart-wrenching-yet-soothing ballad" by Billboard.

Ailee released her fifth extended play titled I'm on October 6, 2020, with the lead single "When We Were In Love". The music video was released on October 12, 2020, and was directed by Will Kim. On November 8, 2020, Ailee released "Blue Bird", an OST that would be part nine of singles for the South Korean drama Start-Up.

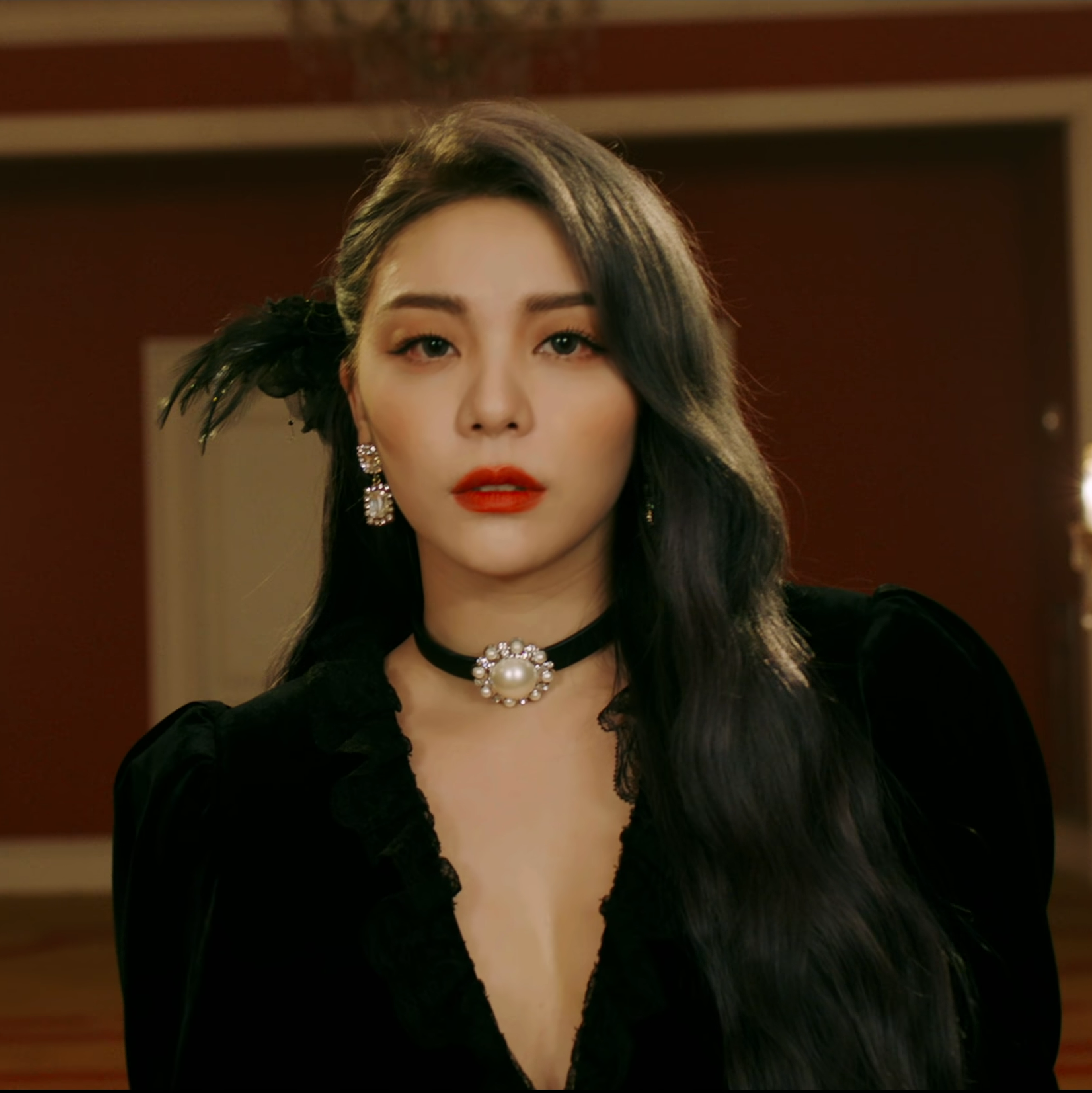
Ailee in the music video for "Don't Teach Me"

On May 7, 2021, Ailee released her sixth extended play titled Lovin', ahead of the release of her third studio album. The extended play includes two lead singles, "Make Up Your Mind" and "Spring Flowers". On July 22, 2021, Ailee joined The L1ve as their first official artist. On October 14, 2021, it was announced that Ailee will be releasing her third studio album Amy on October 27, with the lead single "Don't Teach Me".

On March 7, 2022, Ailee released her English studio album I'm Lovin' Amy. In July 2022, it was announced that Ailee's contract with The L1ve would expire later that month. On July 31, A2Z Entertainment announced that Ailee had signed on with the agency. On November 3, 2022, announced that the '2022 Ailee National Tour Concert 'One Step More', scheduled to take place on the 5th and 6th, has been postponed to January 28 and 29, 2023, on the aftermath of the Seoul Halloween crowd crush.

On September 1, 2023, Ailee released her single "I'll Hold You".

=== 2025–present: (Me)moir ===
On March 20, 2025, Ailee released her seventh extended play, (Me)moir.

== Personal life ==
On April 20, 2025, Ailee married Choi Si-hun in Gangnam, best known for his appearance in Single's Inferno. The couple had already registered their marriage in August 2024.

== Discography ==
Korean albums

- Vivid (2015)
- Butterfly (2019)
- Amy (2021)

English albums

- I'm Lovin' Amy (2022)

== Filmography ==
=== Television drama ===
Year	Title	Role	Ref.
2012	Dream High 2	Ailee	

=== Television shows ===
Year	Title	Role	Notes	Ref.
2012	Vitamin	Main cast		
2013–2014	Great Marriage	Main cast		
2014	MBC Music Ailee's Vitamin	Main cast		
2016	Superstar K 2016 (K8)	Judge		
2017	One Night Food Trip: Food Race	Cast member	Ep. 6–10	
2018	Hyena on the Keyboard	Producer	With Jeong Dong-hwan (Ep. 1–2)	
2018	The Call	Contestant and producer	Ep. 1–8	
2019	Vocal Play	Judge		
2020	Good Girl	Contestant		
2021	The Ghost and Molly McGee	Atomic Pink		
2026	Veiled Cup	Judge		

=== Web shows ===
Year	Title	Role	Ref.
2020	G-Star 2020 – Krafton	Cast member	

== Tours and concerts ==
=== Welcome Home Tour ===
The 'Welcome Home Tour was the first nationwide tour by Ailee, in support of her fourth extended play A New Empire. The tour visited six cities through 2016 and 2017.

Set list

First show in Seoul
1. "U&I"
2. "Worth It"
3. "Mind Your Own Business"
4. "Home"
5. "Heaven" with Lee Min Jung
6. "Now" with Park Su Bin
7. "Evening Sky"
8. "Singing Got Better"
9. "If You"
10. "Everyone"
11. "Letting Go" with Amber Liu
12. "Shake that Brass" with Amber Liu
13. "Live or Die" with Tak
14. "Wrong Encounter", "Bruise" and "Run to You" Mix
15. "No No No"
16. "Don't Touch Me"
17. "I Will Show You"

Encore

1. "All I Want for Christmas is You", "Must Have Love", "White Love" and "Jingle Bells". (Christmas Song Medley)
Final show in Gwangju
1. "U&I"
2. "Worth It"
3. "Mind Your Own Business"
4. "Home"
5. "Heaven"
6. "Now"
7. "Evening Sky"
8. "Singing Got Better"
9. "If You"
10. "Everyone"
11. "I Need You"
12. "Cherry Blossom Ending"
13. "What the Spring"
14. "Feelin" with Eric Nam
15. "Wrong Meeting", "Bruise", "Run to You". (Dance Song Medley)
16. "No No No"
17. "Reminiscing"
18. "I Will Go to You Like the First Snow"

Encore

1. "Don't Touch Me"
2. "I Will Show You"

Tour dates
Date	City	Country	Venue	Audience
December 24, 2016	Seoul	South Korea	Kyunghee University, Grand Peace Palace	20,000
December 25, 2016	Seoul	South Korea	Kyunghee University, Grand Peace Palace	20,000
April 1, 2017	Daegu	South Korea	Kyungpook National University, Grand Hall	20,000
April 8, 2017	Suwon	South Korea	Gyeonggi Arts Center, Grand Theater	20,000
April 15, 2017	Daejeon	South Korea	Chungnam National University, Chungnam Hall	20,000
April 22, 2017	Busan	South Korea	Busan KBS Hall	20,000
June 3, 2017	Gwangju	South Korea	Gwangju Culture & Art Center, Grand Theater	20,000
Total				20,000

=== I Am: Ailee Tour ===
The I Am: Ailee Tour was the second nationwide tour by Ailee. The tour visited four cities in South Korea, starting on December 8, 2018.

Tour dates
Date	City	Country	Venue
December 8, 2018	Seoul	South Korea	Olympic Hall
December 9, 2018	Seoul	South Korea	Olympic Hall
December 21, 2018	Busan	South Korea	Busan Exhibition and Convention Center
December 24, 2018	Daejeon	South Korea	Daejeon Convention Center
December 31, 2018	Daegu	South Korea	Daegu Exhibition & Convention Center

=== I Am: Re-born Tour ===
The I Am: Reborn Tour was the third nationwide tour by Ailee. The first leg of the tour visited seven cities in South Korea, starting on December 7, 2019.

Tour dates
Date	City	Country	Venue
December 7, 2019	Incheon	South Korea	Incheon Culture & Arts Center
December 14, 2019	Gwangju	South Korea	Kimdaejung Convention Center
December 24, 2019	Suwon	South Korea	Gyeonggi Arts Center Grand Theater
December 25, 2019	Daegu	South Korea	EXCO 5F Convention Hall
December 28, 2019	Seongnam	South Korea	Seongnam Arts Center
December 31, 2019	Daejeon	South Korea	Daejeon Convention Center
January 5, 2020	Busan	South Korea	KBS Hall

=== Show Tok ===
The Show Tok was the fourth nationwide tour by Ailee. The first leg of the tour visited seven cities in South Korea, starting on May 1, 2021.

Tour dates
Date	City	Country	Venue
May 1, 2021	Gunpo	South Korea	Suri Hall, Gunpo Culture and Arts Center
May 8, 2021	Anseong	South Korea	Grand Hall, Anseong Art Hall
June 5, 2021	Goyang	South Korea	Goyang Aram Nuri Arts Center
June 11, 2021	Daegu	South Korea	Daegu Exhibition & Convention Center
June 19, 2021	Busan	South Korea	Main Hall, Busan Cultural Center
June 26, 2021	Daejeon	South Korea	Namhansanseong Art Hall
July 3, 2021	Iksan	South Korea	Grand Hall, Iksan Arts Center

=== One-off concerts ===
Date	Title	Country	Venue	Attendance	Ref.
July 4, 2015	Fatal Attraction	South Korea	Gymnastics Stadium, Seoul Olympic Park	3,000	
November 14, 2015	Ailee Concert	United States	The Show, Agua Caliente Casino Resort Spa	—N/a	
June 25, 2017	Ailee – Hello Taipei 2017	Taiwan	The City Hall, Taipei International Convention Center	3,122	
November 18–19, 2017	Ailee Concert	United States	Pechanga Theater, Pechanga Resort and Casino	2,600	
December 23–24, 2017	Her	South Korea	Sejong University Hall, Sejong University	—N/a	
June 22, 2019	Ailee in California 2019	United States	Special Events Center, Fantasy Springs Resort	—N/a	
June 24, 2023		United States	Pechanga Summit, Pechanga Resort Casino		
August 16, 2025		United States	Pechanga Summit, Pechanga Resort Casino		

=== Co-headlining tours and concerts ===
- 2014: Winter Concert with Eric Benet
- 2014: Someday Concert with Wheesung
- 2015: Unite the Mic Tour with Jay Park and San E
- 2015: Back to School Concert with Wheesung
- 2016: Come Here! Concert with Yoon Min-soo
- 2017: Superstage Concert with Brian McKnight and Zion.T
- 2018: Best of Best Concert in Taipei with Taeyeon and Taemin
- 2018: Concert with Dynamic Duo

Awards and achievements
Preceded by Apink	14th Mnet Asian Music Awards – Best New Female Artist Solo; 2012	Succeeded by Crayon Pop
Preceded by Davichi	16th Mnet Asian Music Awards – Best Vocal Performance Female; 2013–2016	Succeeded by Heize
