= A's Doll House =

EP by Ailee
- Released: July 12, 2013
- Recorded: YMC Studio, Seoul, South Korea; 2013
- Genres: K-pop; dance-pop; R&B
- Length: 21:46
- Labels: YMC Entertainment; Neowiz Internet; mirrorball Music; Windmill Media
- Producer: Shinsadong Tiger

Ailee chronology
Invitation (2012)	A's Doll House (2013)	Magazine (2014)

Singles from A's Doll House
- 1. "U&I" Released: July 12, 2013; 2. "No No No" Released: July 22, 2013; 3. "Rainy Day" Released: July 26, 2013

A's Doll House is the second extended play by South Korean singer Ailee. It was released on July 12, 2013, by YMC Entertainment and Neowiz Internet. The singles "U&I", "Rainy Day", and "No No No" were used to promote the EP with "U&I" being the title track.

== Release ==
On July 12, 2013, Ailee released the album, A's Doll House, as well as the music video for "U&I".

The Japanese version of the song U&I is also the second single by Ailee in Japan, which was released on March 19, 2014.

== Promotion ==
Promotions for the album started on July 12, on KBS's Music Bank. Ailee also promoted on Mnet's M! Countdown, MBC's Music Core and Show Champion, and SBS's Inkigayo in July. On July 24, Ailee won her first music show award for "U&I" on MBC Show Champion. Ailee also won 2 Music Bank awards.

== Chart performance ==
The title track, "U&I" was number one on the Gaon Digital Chart for two weeks. "Rainy Day" peaked at thirty one whilst "No No No" peaked at twenty one on the Gaon Digital Chart, both during the week of July 14, 2013.

== Track listing ==
No.	Title	Lyrics	Music	Length
1.	"U&I"	Shinsadong Tiger, Kupa	Shinsadong Tiger, Kupa	3:16
2.	"No No No"	Heo Seong Jin	Ha Hyung Joo, Heo Seong Jin	3:21
3.	"Rainy Day"	Double K, DJ R2	DJ R2, Blacc Hole	3:43
4.	"How Could You Do This To Me" (이런 법이 어딨어)	Rhymer, Heo Inchang	MasterKey	3:43
5.	"Scandal" (열애설)	Kim Eana	JeA (Brown Eyed Girls), KZ	4:04
6.	"I'll be OK"	Yang Seung Wook, Bigtone	Yang Seung Wook, Bigtone	3:39
Total length:				21:46

== Charts ==
Chart	Peak position
Gaon Weekly albums chart	6

== Sales and certifications ==
Chart	Amount
Gaon physical sales	11,597+
