= Baechigi =

South Korean hip hop duo

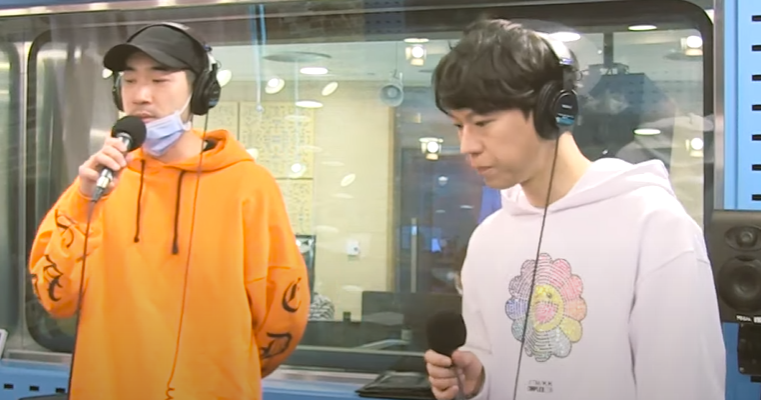
- Baechigi in 2020; Left to right: Muwoong and Tak

Background information
- Also known as: BaeChiGi
- Origin: Seoul, South Korea
- Genres: K-Pop; Hip hop
- Years active: 2005–present
- Labels: Sniper Sound (2005–2012); YMC Entertainment (2012–2017)
- Members: Muwoong; Tak
- Website: Baechigi

Baechigi (Korean: 배치기; stylized as BaeChiGi) is a South Korean hip hop duo formed by Sniper Sound in 2005. The duo moved to YMC Entertainment in 2012. They debuted on February 17, 2005, with the album Giant.

== Members ==
- Muwoong (무웅)
- Tak (탁)

== Discography ==
=== Studio albums ===
Title	Album details	Peak chart positions	Sales
Title	Album details	KOR	Sales
Giant	Released: February 17, 2005; Label: Sniper Sound; Formats: CD	39	KOR: 8,781
Turn a Deaf Ear (마이동풍)	Released: September 4, 2006; Label: Sniper Sound; Formats: CD	12	KOR: 15,807
Out of Control	Released: June 9, 2008; Label: Sniper Sound; Formats: CD	9	KOR: 22,561

=== Extended plays ===
Title	Album details	Peak chart positions	Sales
Title	Album details	KOR	Sales
2 Guys (두 마리)	Released: April 12, 2012; Label: YMC Entertainment; Formats: CD, digital download	—	—N/a
Album 4 Part 2	Released: January 13, 2013; Label: YMC Entertainment; Formats: CD, digital download	—	—N/a
Heavy Armour (갑중갑)(甲中甲)	Released: August 6, 2015; Label: YMC Entertainment; Formats: CD, digital download	29	KOR: 460
Regression (회귀)(回歸)	Released: June 17, 2016; Label: YMC Entertainment; Formats: CD, digital download	47	—N/a
367	Released: May 9, 2018; Label: 367; Formats: CD, digital download	—	—N/a
"—" denotes releases that did not chart.

=== Singles ===
Title	Year	Peak chart positions	Sales	Album
Title	Year	KOR	Sales	Album
"Nice to Meet You" (반갑습니다) (feat. AG)	2005	—	—N/a	Giant
"Turn a Deaf Ear" (마이동풍)	2006	—	—N/a	Turn a Deaf Ear
"No.3" (feat. Sol Flower)	2008	—	—N/a	Out of Control
"Cain" (가인) (feat. Nemo of Miss $)	2009	—	—N/a	367 Days
"2 Guys" (두 마리)	2012	14	KOR: 996,879+	2 Guys
"Shower of Tears" (눈물샤워) (feat. Ailee)	2013	1	KOR: 1,880,676+	Album 4 Part 2
"Dduraeyo" (뜨래요) (feat. Angli of 3B)	2014	5	KOR: 695,764+	Non-album singles
"Boy Jump" (소년점프) (feat. Hwasa of Mamamoo)	2014	80	KOR: 50,181+	Non-album singles
"Nightmare" (악몽) (feat. Park Soo-jin)	2014	10	KOR: 278,285+	Non-album singles
"Shut It" (닥쳐줘요) (feat. Solji of EXID)	2015	50	KOR: 98,775+	Heavy Armour
"Classy Farewell" (이별의 품격) (feat. Lyn)	2015	74	KOR: 28,334+	Non-album single
"Walkak" (왈칵) (feat. Yeoeun of Melody Day)	2016	42	KOR: 62,045+	Regression
"Drunk" (술김에) (feat. Jessi of Lucky J)	2016	66	KOR: 73,190+	Regression
"MoonLight"	2017	—	—N/a	Non-album single
"—" denotes releases that did not chart.

=== Soundtrack appearances ===
Year	Title	Drama
2014	"Because It's Love" (사랑하니까) (feat. Shin Bo-ra)	All About My Romance OST
2014	"Mirage" (신기루) (feat. Kim Bo-kyung)	Three Days OST
2015	"Fly With the Wind" (바람에 날려) (feat. Punch)	Who Are You: School 2015 OST

== Awards and nominations ==
=== Mnet Asian Music Awards ===
Year	Nominee / work	Award	Result
2005	"Nice to Meet You" (반갑습니다) feat. AG	Best New Group	Nominated
2006	"Turn a Deaf Ear" (마이동풍)	Best Hip Hop Performance	Nominated
2013	"Shower of Tears" (눈물샤워) feat. Ailee	Best Rap Performance	Nominated
2013	Baechigi	Discovery of the Year	Won

=== Melon Music Awards ===
Year	Nominee / work	Award	Result
2013	"Shower of Tears" (눈물샤워) feat. Ailee	Best Rap/Hip Hop Song	Won

=== Golden Disk Awards ===
Year	Nominee / work	Award	Result
2014	"Shower of Tears" (눈물샤워) feat. Ailee	Best Rap/Hip Hop Song	Won
