= Wheesung =

South Korean singer (1982–2025)

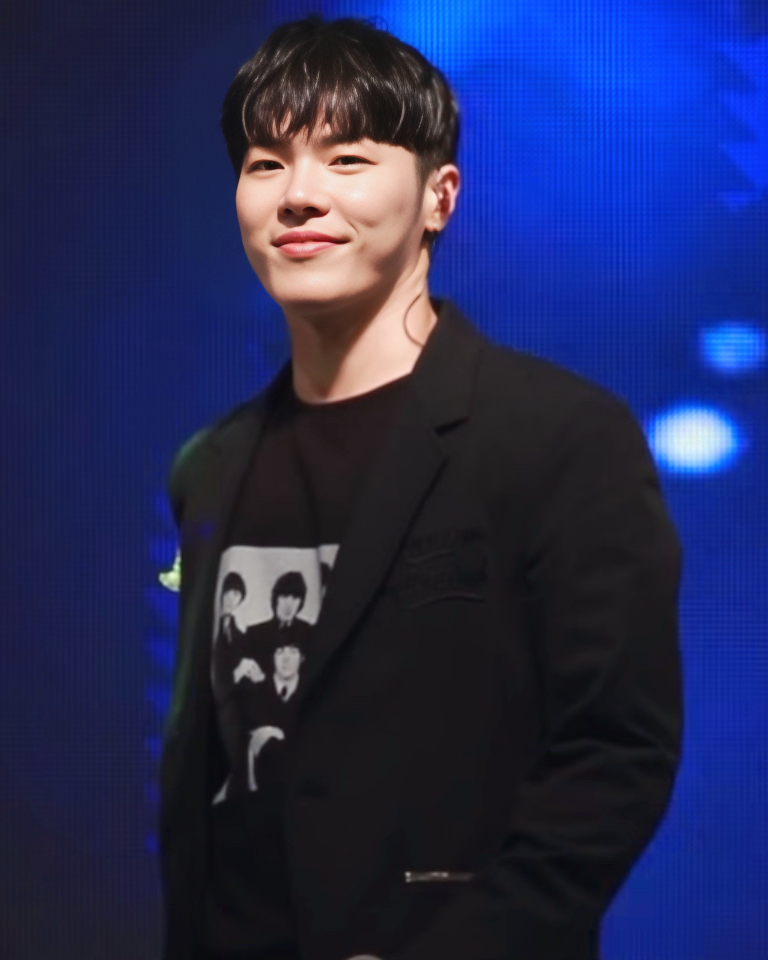
- Wheesung in 2018

Background information
- Also known as: Realslow
- Born: Choi Whee-sung; February 5, 1982; Seoul, South Korea
- Died: c. March 10, 2025 (aged 43) Seoul, South Korea
- Genres: R&B; K-pop
- Occupations: Singer-songwriter; record producer; musical theatre actor
- Instrument: Vocals
- Years active: 1997–2025
- Labels: DR; YG; OrangeShock; POP/UP; YMC; Realslow Company; Tajoy
- Formerly of: A4; MAME

Korean name
- Hangul: 최휘성
- RR: Choe Hwiseong
- MR: Ch'oe Hwisŏng

Choi Whee-sung (Korean: 최휘성; February 5, 1982 – c. March 10, 2025), known professionally as Wheesung or by the stage name Realslow, was a South Korean R&B singer-songwriter, record producer and musical theatre actor.

== Career ==
=== 1982-: Early life and education ===
Wheesung was born on February 5, 1982, in Seoul. His paternal grandfather was a dentist who fled from North Korea and financially supported his family until he fell ill with a chronic illness for several years. By the time Wheesung's father got married, they were almost penniless and Wheesung suffered financial hardships throughout childhood and school years. He was an avid dancer in high school where he was part of a rock band named Zenesis, and began singing in his senior year. He graduated from Mapo High School and briefly attended classes in Ahyeon Polytechnic School as well, where he was a classmate with notable musicians such as Park Hyo-shin and Hwanhee from R&B duo Fly to the Sky. He was also active in a hip-hop society called SNP, which contributed to the rise of early stage Korean hip-hop. Its members included hip-hop musicians such as Verbal Jint, P-Type and Jung-in.

After graduating from high school, he initially attended the Sun Moon University, under the journalism major but dropped out. Wheesung subsequently attended the Gukje Digital University and Kyung Hee University's Graduate School of Communication.

=== 1997–1999: Dance Team and Group Debut ===
He started his career in 1997 as a member of a backup dance team ING. Wheesung began his career in 1999 with a short lived Korean boy group, A4. He left after the band's first album debut, citing musical differences between himself and the other members of the band. After that, he joined a rock band, MAME, as vocalist for a short while. He also participated in the MBC College Music Festival (MBC 강변가요제) in 2000.

=== 2000–2006: Solo debut and YG Entertainment ===
In 2000, he signed onto M Boat, a former sister company to YG Entertainment. He underwent a few years of vocal training under the label and released his first solo album Like A Movie in 2002. The album achieved both public popularity and critical acclaim, receiving praises from many well-known artists including Seo Taiji and Shin Seung Hun. With his debut song, "Can't I(안 되나요)," he won multiple awards, including Golden Disc Awards, as the new artist of the year. In 2003, he released his second album, It's Real. It proved to be as popular as his first, making him the best selling artist of 2003 in Korea. With his second album, he broadened his scope to include various musical elements like pop and hip-hop on top of R&B and ballads.

=== 2006–2009: Orange Shock Agency ===
Wheesung left YG Entertainment after his contract expired in March 2006. He signed a new contract that was reportedly worth 1.5 billion won with his new company Orange Shock Agency.

Wheesung collaborated with many artists. In late 2008, Wheesung collaborated once again with Lee Hyori, who featured as his girlfriend in his music video of "별이 지다.." (Fading Star) from the With All My Heart and Sou album. In 2009, Wheesung planned to collaborate with producer Lee Hyun-do to produce a new album, with a release date being set for August 2009. In the same year, he also made a big hit by covering Craig David's "Insomnia" in Korean.

=== 2009–2011: POP/UP Entertainment ===
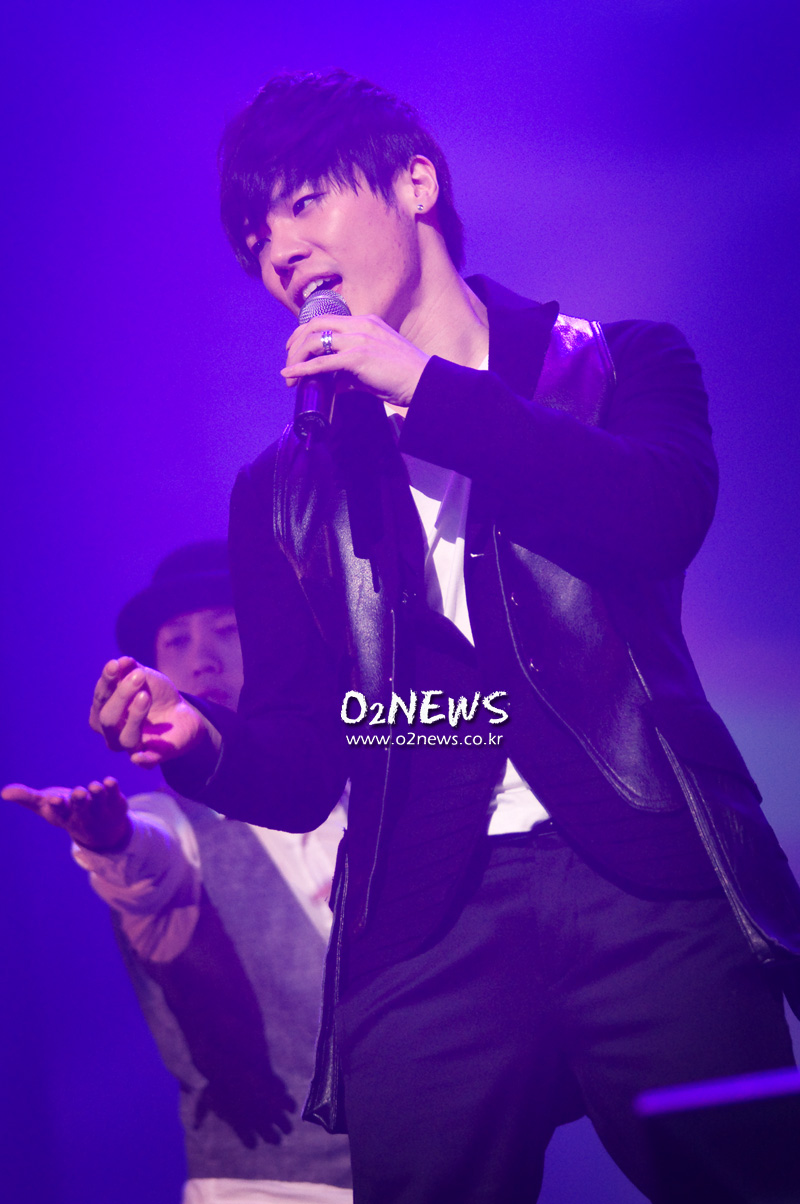
Wheesung performs at Beyond the Dream Concert

In April 2009, Wheesung was announced as the MC of a new Mnet TV show called "Pre Star-1 Show". The show gave opportunities for new talented singers to introduce themselves, a platform for them to reach out to more fans. Every month about nine or ten teams will be introduced on Mnet.com and the team which receives most response from the netizens will be chosen onto the show. The chosen team/singer will also be given the chance to perform with popular stars. Wheesung's 'Pre-Show 1 Show' started airing on April 24 on Mnet Cable Channel.

Wheesung had participated in several Kpop concerts in Los Angeles, California, including the Hollywood Bowl, and the Victory Concert. On June 19, 2009, Wheesung and Lena Park held a concert in Los Angeles Disney Concert Hall. After the concert, Wheesung planned to stay in Los Angeles for a month to work on his new album with producer Lee Hyun-do. The new album will go back to the r&b/hiphop style similar to "With Me" and "Incurable Disease". On June 27 and July 4, Wheesung performed at "Insomnia Concert" and club Le Cercle in LA. On July 11, he performed at the HALO nightclub in Hollywood.

In June 2009, Wheesung changed his label again from Orange Shock to POP/UP Entertainment, which houses stars like JK Kim Dong Wook and group M to M.

=== 2011–2016: YMC Entertainment ===
In 2011, he transferred to Tae Jin Ah's YMC Entertainment. Soon after joining YMC Entertainment, he recruited female singer Ailee.

=== 2017–2025: Realslow Company, new stage name and final projects ===
In 2017, Wheesung parted ways with YMC Entertainment after his contract with the agency came to an end. He set up an independent label called Realslow Company, and announced that he will now be promoting under the stage name Realslow.

Realslow was a stage name used by Wheesung when he was an underground singer. Wheesung gained attention in the early 2000s as an underground musician before he debuted in 2002. The name references his love and passion for R&B music, which still struggles to have much popularity in Korea. Through this new name and label, Wheesung aims to return to his roots and produce some soulful R&B music.

== Personal life ==
=== Military service ===
On November 7, 2011, he enlisted for mandatory military service. He served 21 months of active service after completing five-week of basic training course at a boot camp in Nonsan, South Chungcheong Province.

On July 11, 2012, Wheesung was granted a 9 nights, 10 days temporary leave from the army to undergo surgery for a herniated disc as well as other medical conditions such as bilateral shoulders dislocation, psoriasis, and alopecia.

On August 9, 2013, Wheesung was discharged from the military.

=== Drug use ===
In 2013, the singer was accused of using propofol from 2011 to early 2013 in various places including dermatology clinics in Gangnam, Seoul. Wheesung claimed he used it to treat a herniated disk and hair loss. The court later cleared him of the allegations.

On March 31, 2020, Wheesung was found passed out in a bathroom of a shopping mall in Seoul after using Etomidate. A black bag containing four syringes and five white vials were found lying next to him. Not being classified as a narcotic in South Korea, police released him but confiscated the items of the black bag. On the same day, the man who sold drugs to Wheesung without a doctor's prescription was arrested after a CCTV analysis of Wheesung's trail prior to his discovery unconscious in the bathroom.

On April 2, 2020, Wheesung was found again collapsed in a bathroom of a hotel in Gwangjin District, Seoul, with a syringe and a glass bottle containing Etomidate. Although released, a hair and urine test analysis was performed.

In April 2020, ex-TV personality Amy revealed she and a celebrity friend, later confirmed to be Wheesung, partook in recreational propofol use. While investigating a tip, the police had come to suspect Wheesung of purchasing propofol and sent his case to the prosecution with a recommendation of indictment. Later, Wheesung was charged for propofol use several times in December 2019.

At the first trial on January 19, 2021, prosecutors at the Daegu District Court sought a three-year prison sentence. Wheesung pleaded guilty and received a sentence of one year in prison, probation for two years, 40 hours of community service, and 40 hours of drug treatment lectures.

== Death ==
On March 10, 2025, Wheesung was found dead at his home in the Gwangjin District of Seoul, at the age of 43. Police said that there was no sign of foul play. Initial findings from an autopsy said the cause of death is "unknown". Wheesung was buried on March 16.

== Discography ==
=== Studio albums ===
- Like a Movie (2002)
- It's Real (2003)
- For the Moment (2004)
- Love... Love...? Love...! (2005)
- Eternal Essence of Music (2007)
- Vocolate (2009)

=== Mini albums ===
- With All My Heart and Soul (2008)
- They Are Coming (2011)
- The Best Man (2014)
- Transformation (2016)
- In Space (2018)

=== Single albums ===
- Realslow Is Back (2010)
- Heartsore Story (2011)

== Bibliography ==
Year	Title	ISBN	Ref.
2009	Nonetheless, I am Still ING	ISBN 978-8901101545	

== Filmography ==
=== Musicals ===
- 2014-2015: Zorro as Zorro
- 2016: All Shook Up as Elvis
- 2017–2018: All Shook Up as Elvis

=== Variety shows ===
- 2009: Mnet & tvN, Wheesung's Pre Star 1Show, MC
- 2017–2018: tvN, My English Puberty, (나의영어 사춘기), E1-E8
- 2018: Channel A, Galaxy, (우주를줄게), E1-10
- 2018: Mnet & tvN, The Call, E1-5、8
- 2018: tvN, A Battle of One Voice: 300, (하나의 목소리 전쟁: 300), E3、5
- 2018: MBC plus, New Music God (창작의신)
- 2018: TV Chosun, Neighbour Album (동네앨범)
- 2019: KBS 2TV, The Hit (뮤직셔플쇼 더 히트)

== Concerts ==
Year	Name	
2002	Wheesung 1st Concert	
2002	Wheesung 2nd Concert White Romantist	
2003	Wheesung It's Real Movement	
2003	솔트레인 2003 Concert	Gummy SE7EN BIGMAMA
2004	Wheesung It's Real Movement II	
2004	Wheesung Theater Concert Like his Diary	
2004	솔트레인 2004 Concert	Gummy SE7EN BIGMAMA
2004	2004 JTN Live Concert 4th Wheesung & Gummy	Gummy
2005	Good Friends Concert	Gummy SE7EN BIGMAMA
2005	2005 4Color Story Concert	Kim Jang-hoon Fly to the Sky M To M
2006	Wheesung Concert Poison	
2006	Love Love Love Wheesung Birthday	
2006	BIG4 Concert	FT Island M To M SG Wannabe
2007	2007 Whee Show Welcome to Realslow World	
2007	26th Happy Whee's day	
2007	BIG4 Concert	SG Wannabe Vibe SeeYa
2008	2008 Whee Show	
2008	Happy Whee's Day Birthday Party	
2008	2008 JTN Live Concert 9th Wheesung & MC THE MAX	MC THE MAX
2008	2008 The Soul Concert	Gummy Park Hyo Shin Jung Yup
2009	2009 Wheesung Concert The Man	
2009	2009 The Soul The Vocalist Concert	Bobby Kim Kim Bum Soo
2009	2009 Dream Concert	
2010	Wheesung Real Slow is Back Concert	
2010	2010 The Soul The Vocalist Concert	Bobby Kim Gummy
2010	The Great Moment Season 1	Leessang Jeong In Gummy Lee Young Hyun
2010	2010 JTN Live Concert 7	
2011	Wheesung & Kim Tae Woo 2011 Two Men Show Soul Twins & Encore	Kim Tae Woo
2011	Wheesung & Kim Tae Woo 2011 Two Men Show Soul Twins Encore	Kim Tae Woo
2013	Wheesung & Gummy Do It Live Tour Concert	Gummy
2014	Wheesung Live Tour Concert 2014 Whee Show	
2014	2014 JTN Live Concert 3月	
2014	2014 Valentine's Day Kiss Concert	Gummy
2014	2014 Someday Concert 3rd	Ailee
2014	2014 Someday Concert 4th	Shin Yong Jae
2014	The Voice Concert	Ailee Kim Bum Soo Shin Yong Jae Yoon Jong Shin
2014	JTBC Hidden Singer Concert	
2015	Wheesung Live Tour Concert 2015 Whee Show	
2015	2015 Wheesung & Ailee Concert Back to School	Ailee
2015	Wheesung & Gummy US Soulmate Concert	Gummy
2015	Legend Concert Wheesung	
2015	2015 The Plaza Countdown Party	
2015	Someday Festival 2015	
2016	2016 Wheesung Live Concert On Air	
2016	WHEESUNG CONCERT in TOKYO 2016	
2016	Seong Nam Concert with Wheesung	
2016	Wheesung & K.Will Bromance Show	K.Will
2016	Wheesung & Yoon Min-soo Concert	Yoon Min-soo
2016	Wheesung & Zion.T Voice II Men Concert	Zion.T
2016	Wheesung & Bada Peoplegate The Best Emotion of Concert	Bada
2016	Wheesung x Gummy x Kim Kyung-ho Summer Dream Concert	Gummy Kim Kyung-ho
2016	Wheesung & ALi Concert Cantare Festa	ALi
2016	2016 JTN Live Concert Wheesung & Lucky J	Lucky J
2016	젊은외침 통일 콘서트	Bada San.E Verbal.J Sool J
2016	신사들의 품격	Yoon Hyung-Ryul Lee Chang-min Han Ji-sang
2017	2017 Wheesung Live Concert On Air	
2017	2017 Wheesung National Tour Concert Get Sexxy	
2017	Insomnia with Wheesung Concert	
2017	Wheesung & Kim Tae-woo Voice II Men Concert	Kim Tae-woo
2018	Wheesung Concert Get Sexxy Encore	
2018	Wheesung Concert	
2018	Wheesung & Gummy Concert	Gummy
2018	Star Pack Concert 5	K.Will Ailee
2018	2018 Dream Concert	
2018	Wheesung Real Healing Concert	
2018	Wheesung & Lyn Summer Concert	Lyn
2018	2018 DMC Festival Super Concert	
2018	Wheesung & Jung in Forest Live (TV Chosun)	Jung In
2018	Wheesung & Hwanhee Concert	Hwanhee
2018	2018 Realslow Wheesung Fan Meeting	
2018	Mini K-Pop Concert by WheeSung	National Theater, Abu Dhabi
2018	2018 Wheesung Realslow Concert Get Sexxy Season 2	
2019	2019 Wheesung Realslow Concert Get Sexxy Season 2	
2021	Wheesung Christmas Concert	
2022	2022 Wheesung Valentine Concert	
2022	2022 Wheesung Fan Meeting & 20th Concert	
2023	Wheesung Family gathering Concert	
2024	Wheesung Christmas Concert 'Winterfall'	
2025	2025 Wheesung “HAPPY 휘's DAY” Fan Meeting	

== Awards and nominations ==
Year presented, name of the award ceremony, award category, nominated work and the result of the nomination
Year	Award	Category	Nominated work	Result	Ref.
2002	Golden Disc Awards	Best New Artist	"Can't I" (안되나요)	Won	
2002	MBC Ten Singers Song Festival	Best New Artist		Won	
2002	Mnet Music Video Festival	Best New Male Artist	"Can't I" (안되나요)	Nominated	
2002	Mnet Music Video Festival	Best R&B Performance	"Can't I" (안되나요)	Nominated	
2002	SBS Gayo Daejeon	R&B Award		Won	
2002	Seoul Music Awards	Best New Artist		Won	
2003	Golden Disc Awards	Main Prize (Bonsang)	"With Me"	Won	
2003	MBC Ten Singers Song Festival	Top Ten Singer (Bonsang)		Won	
2003	Mnet Music Video Festival	Best Male Artist	"With Me"	Won	
2003	Mnet Music Video Festival	Best R&B Performance	"With Me"	Nominated	
2003	SBS Gayo Daejeon	Main Prize (Bonsang)		Won	
2003	Seoul Music Awards	Main Prize (Bonsang)		Won	
2004	Golden Disc Awards	Main Prize (Bonsang)	"Incurable Disease" (불치병)	Won	
2004	KBS Music Awards	Best Singer (Bonsang)		Won	
2004	Korean Music Awards	Musician of the Year	It's Real	Won	
2004	MBC Ten Singers Song Festival	Top Ten Singer (Bonsang)		Won	
2004	Mnet Km Music Video Festival	Best Male Video	"Incurable Disease" (불치병)	Nominated	
2004	Mnet Km Music Video Festival	Best R&B Video	"Incurable Disease" (불치병)	Won	
2005	Golden Disc Awards	Main Prize (Bonsang)	"Goodbye Luv"	Won	
2005	KBS Music Awards	Best Singer (Bonsang)		Won	
2005	Korean Music Awards	Best R&B and Soul Album	For the Moment	Nominated	
2005	Mnet Km Music Video Festival	Best Male Artist	"Goodbye Luv"	Nominated	
2005	Mnet Km Music Video Festival	Best R&B Performance	"Goodbye Luv"	Won	
2005	SBS Gayo Daejeon	Main Prize (Bonsang)		Won	
2007	Golden Disc Awards	Main Prize (Bonsang)	"Delicious Love" (사랑은 맛있다)	Won	
2007	Mnet Km Music Festival	Best R&B Performance	"Delicious Love" (사랑은 맛있다)	Nominated	
2009	Korean Music Awards	Best R&B and Soul Album	With All My Heart and Soul	Nominated	
2009	Korean Music Awards	Male Musician of the Year	With All My Heart and Soul	Nominated	
2010	Mnet Asian Music Awards	Best Male Solo Artist	"Even Thought of Marriage" (결혼까지 생각했어)	Nominated	
2010	Mnet Asian Music Awards	Best Vocal Performance (Solo)	"Even Thought of Marriage" (결혼까지 생각했어)	Nominated	
2011	Mnet Asian Music Awards	Best Male Solo Artist	"Heartsore Story" (가슴 시린 이야기)	Nominated	
2014	Korea Culture and Entertainment Awards	K-Pop Top Ten Singer Award		Won	
2014	Mnet Asian Music Awards	Best Vocal Performance (Male)	"Night and Day"	Nominated	
2014	SBS M Best of the Best	Best Male Solo		Won	
2014	Seoul Success Awards	Singer Grand Prize		Won	
2018	Soribada Best K-Music Awards	Voice Award		Won	
2019	Korean Arts and Culture Awards	Music Producer Award		Won	
2024	Korea Social Contribution Awards	Social Contributor Award		Won	
