= YMC Entertainment =

South Korean company

- Native name: YMC 엔터테인먼트
- Type: Private
- Industry: Music; Entertainment
- Genre: K-pop; R&B; Soul; Ballad; Hip-Hop
- Founded: 2010
- Founder: Jo Yoo-myung
- Defunct: 2018
- Headquarters: Seoul, South Korea
- Owner: Dream T Entertainment - 41%; Imagine Asia - 39%; Cho Yoo-myung - 20%
- Parent: Dream T Entertainment
- Website: www.ymcent.com

YMC Entertainment (Korean: YMC 엔터테인먼트) was a South Korean entertainment company established in 2010 by Cho Yoo-myung, the eldest son of trot singer Tae Jin-ah.

The company has been formerly home to artists such as Shin Bo-ra, Kassy and Soulights, as well as actresses including Kim Ji-ah.

In 2015, Dream T Entertainment became a majority shareholder of YMC having acquired 80% of the entire company.

== Former artists ==
- Mighty Mouth (2012–2015)
- Wheesung (2012–2016)
- Baechigi (2012–2017)
- Sugar Bowl (2014–2015)
- Lucky J (2014–2016)
  - Jessi (2014–2018)
- Joohee (2015–2016)
- Baekchan (2015–2016)
- I.O.I (2016–2017)
- Wanna One (2017–2018)
- Ailee (2010–2019)
- Kassy (co-managed with Nextar Entertainment)
- Soulights
- Shin Bo-ra
