= Hidden Singer (South Korean TV series) =

South Korean television series

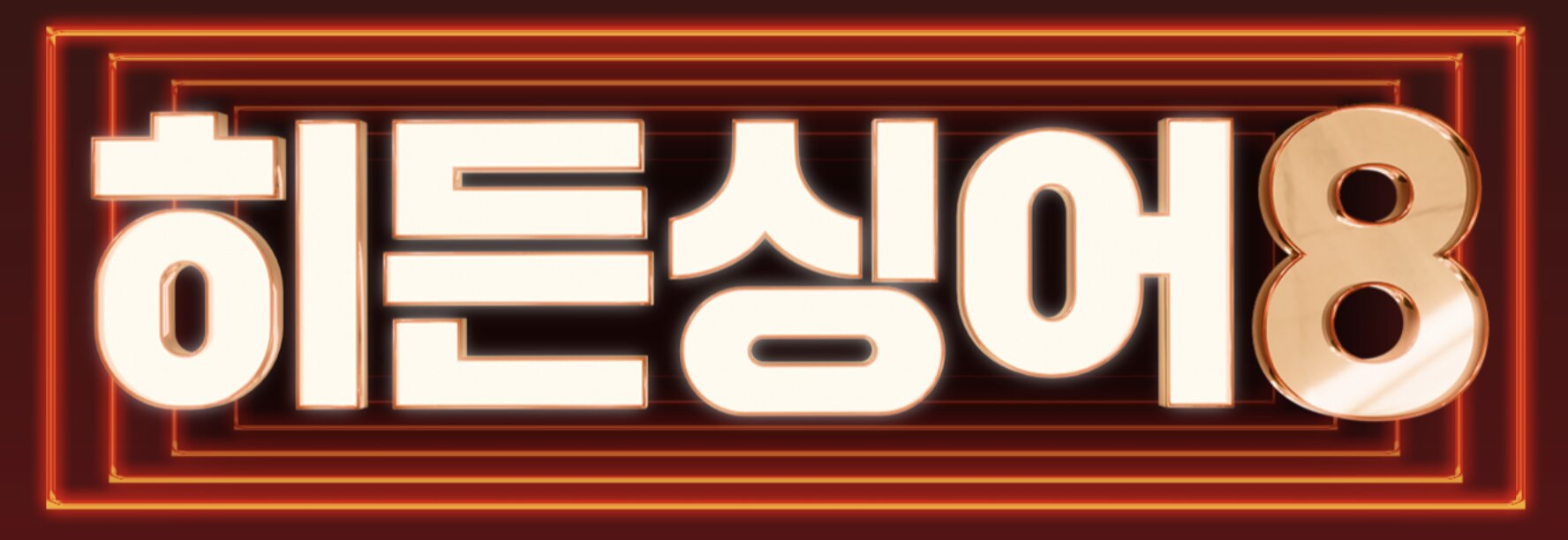
- Hidden Singer Season 8's Logo
- Genre: Reality show; Variety show; Music show; Mystery
- Directed by: Cho Seung-wook (Note: Season 1 - Season 7), Hong Sang-hoon (Note: Season 8)
- Presented by: Jun Hyun-moo
- Starring: Various participants and artists
- Narrated by: Yoon Sun-myeong; Seon Joo-hee
- Country of origin: South Korea
- Original language: Korean
- No. of seasons: 8
- No. of episodes: Pilot: 2; Regular: 123; Special: 12

Production
- Producer: Kim Seok-yoon
- Cinematography: Choi Sung-jin
- Editor: Lee Geon-young
- Camera setup: Multi-cameras
- Running time: 120 minutes
- Production company: JTBC

Original release
- Network: JTBC
- Release: December 21, 2012 – June 16, 2026

Hidden Singer (Korean: 히든싱어; RR: Hideun Singeo) is a South Korean variety-music TV program broadcast on JTBC. The mechanics are a famous singer and several of their impersonators sing one measure of a song behind the blinds for four rounds. In the first three rounds, an audience of 100 people vote on the person who they think is not the real singer, the person with the most votes would be eliminated. In the final round, the audience votes on who they think is the real singer, the person with the most votes would win the episode. The program is hosted by Jun Hyun-moo. Starting Season 5, Song Eun-i has become a fixed cast member and works as the assistant host. Known for its high standards in reality television, the show focuses on nostalgia and vocal similarity, often creating intense, viral showdowns. This program is known as JTBC’s flagship music entertainment show and has consistently earned top ratings and strong viewer demand over the years.

After around three years of hiatus, since the fourth season's end, the program began its fifth season by airing a "comeback special" episode on June 10, 2018; the regular episodes air starting from June 17, 2018.

A sixth season was confirmed after two years, starting with a "comeback special" episode that aired on July 31, 2020.

After two years of hiatus, the seventh season aired from August 19, 2022. This marks the tenth anniversary celebration of the show.

The eighth season aired on March 31, 2026, after four years of hiatus.

== Series overview ==
Season	Host	Vocal trainer	Broadcast date	Total episodes
1	Jun Hyun-moo	Jo Hong-kyung	December 21, 2012 – December 28, 2012	2 (pilot)
1	Jun Hyun-moo	Jo Hong-kyung	March 16, 2013 – June 22, 2013	17
2	Jun Hyun-moo	Jo Hong-kyung	October 12, 2013 – January 25, 2014	16 + 2 (special)
3	Jun Hyun-moo	Jo Hong-kyung	August 2, 2014 – December 6, 2014	17 + 2 (special)
4	Jun Hyun-moo	Jo Hong-kyung	October 3, 2015 – January 16, 2016	16 + 5 (special)
5	Jun Hyun-moo	Jang Woo-ram	June 17, 2018 – October 7, 2018	17 + 1 (special)
6	Jun Hyun-moo	Jang Woo-ram	July 31, 2020 – November 13, 2020	14 + 2 (special)
7	Jun Hyun-moo	Jang Woo-ram	August 19, 2022 – November 18, 2022	14
8	Jun Hyun-moo	Jang Woo-ram	March 31, 2026 – June 16, 2026	12

== Format ==
In each episode, one singer is the star of the episode, and in each round, he/she sings with impersonators a certain mission song in the hidden stage (Note: In round 4 of Kim Gun-mo's episode, three songs were combined into a medley.) while the audience attempts to find the impersonators and the original singer. If the real singer is eliminated midway, they still participate in the remaining rounds (albeit with null votes). In the end, if an impersonator wins the episode, he/she would receive 20 million won. If the real singer won the episode, the second-place impersonator would get 100,000 won times the number of votes they got in the final round.

Some episodes featured deceased singers. (Note: Kim Kwang-seok, Shin Hae-chul, Kim Hyun-sik, Turtleman) To commemorate their legacy, vocals extracted from archival live performances or original recordings were used in place during the shoot. Starting in Season 6, rematch episodes were introduced, bringing back original singers from previous seasons to compete against a new group of higher-quality impersonators. (Note: Baek Ji-young, Kim Jong-kook, Jang Yoon-jung, Park Jung-hyun)

=== Round 1 ===
The singer and five impersonators go in order (from #1-#6, though before, after, or in between individual parts, multiple or all singers can sing at once). At the end of the first half of the song, the 100-member audience votes on who they believe sounds least like the original singer, and the celebrity panel discusses their votes and thoughts on the real singer's position. When the results are revealed, the number of votes are shown for each person in order (there have been case where the votes are shown in reverse order), and the one with the highest number of votes is eliminated. If it is an impersonator, they introduce themself. In round 1, only the doors for the real singer and eliminated participant are opened. As in four episodes so far, if the original singer is not in the hidden stage because six impersonators were chosen instead of five, there would be six impersonators in the next round (The real singer is said to be in "room number 7").

=== Round 2 ===
The remaining five (or six) sing half of the next song in the hidden stage (with their positions shuffled). After voting and discussion, the next half of the song is sung, but the doors are opened, and the impersonators faces are revealed. The eliminated participant is then announced, and, if an impersonator is eliminated, he/she introduces themself.

=== Round 3 ===
The singer and three (or four) surviving impersonators sing the next song in the hidden stage, but the music does not stop. Instead, the audience votes during the interlude, and the impersonators' and singer's positions are revealed during the second half. During round 3, the surviving impersonators also introduce themselves. Each one has a nickname like (nickname)(singer's name). Nicknames are usually qualities (like "Handsome Man Nam Jin"), places of origin (like "Jinju Kim Kyung-ho"), song titles that are relevant to their backstory as a fan (like "On The Street Kim Kwang-seok"), occupations (like "Welder Im Chang-jung"), or even puns ("Who Shin Ji/누구 신지" is a pun on the phrase "Nugushinji" which translates to "Who is it") though there can be other types. The impersonators can be celebrities, foreigners, and both male and female regardless of the singer's gender. Around this time, a medley of the singer's songs (that are not mission songs) or a special performance are sung by members of the panel and the impersonators. At the end of round 3, the eliminated participant is announced.

=== Round 4 ===
Round 4 performance works the same as round 3. The singer and two (or three) surviving impersonators sing the final song in the hidden stage, but the music does not stop. Instead, the audience votes during the interlude on who they think the real singer is. After the votes are cast, the impersonators' and singer's positions are revealed during the second half. After the song the third place is announced, and then the winner (As a running gag, in most episodes, right before the winner is announced, the host says "Cue commercial!" generally causing an uproar). The last surviving impersonator wins money depending on what place they ranked and how many votes they got. This impersonator also gets to go to the end-of-season King of Kings championship. Sometimes, if there is a tie for two impersonators as runner-ups, both impersonators will receive prize money and participate in the championship. If the singer was eliminated prior to announcing the winner, the singer will announce the winner of the episode in place of the host. In Seasons 4-5, an extra prize of a travel voucher was given, and in Seasons 6-7, due to COVID, this was changed to a Korean meat set. Sometimes at the end, an encore is sung by the impersonators and the singer.

Starting in Season 8, if there are 5 rounds in total, then the audience would vote who they believe sounds least like the original singer. At the end of round 4, the eliminated participant is announced.

=== Round 5 ===
Starting in Season 8, a fifth round was implemented. However, not every singer who appeared in Season 8 had five rounds. The production staff felt that selecting four songs would be insufficient for a legendary singer with numerous hit songs, so they decided to add an extra round. Round 5 works the same as Round 4 in previous seasons, while Round 4 functions like Round 3 from earlier seasons, except that all the impersonators have already introduced themselves in Round 3.

=== Covid-19 voting changes ===
In the latter half of Season 6, due to the Covid-19 pandemic, the voting system changed temporarily. Only the panel of celebrities would be present, and live viewers could vote online when possible during the livestream. This led to some controversy as people speculated it could be rigged/manipulated.

=== King of Kings Championship ===
The King of Kings Championship is the season finale (usually) where all the winning impersonators compete against each other. For the first four seasons, the champions would be divided into Groups A, B, and C. Each singer would sing half of a song behind the door, and the 300-member audience would vote zero if they thought the singer was good. They would open the door, and the champion would sing the next half of the song. After all singers in a group had sung, the scores would be revealed (generally one or two digits at a time), and whoever had the most votes would move to the finals. If two champions tied for the most votes, they both would advance. In the finals, each singer sings like in the qualifiers, except that from Season 2 onwards, the finals were broadcast live, with hundreds of thousands of voters. The winner would get money and a special prize (like an expensive car) In Seasons 3 and 4, between the qualifiers and the finals, viewers could vote for a "wildcard" who would go to the finals as a fourth member. In Season 5, the format changed, where each singer would perform one by one, and the score out of 300 would be revealed before the next performer. The top three out of the twelve would with money and prizes. In Season 6, the format changed again, where instead of voting zero, each voter out of 200 would rate the singer from 1 to 10 (2000 possible points) after each performance, the panel's votes (out of 300 points) were revealed after each stage, and the total votes for each person were revealed at the end. In Season 7, the format is the same as the previous season except the panel's votes were out of 250 points instead. In Seasons 1 and 7, midway through the performances, a "re-challenge" would happen, where a singer and his five impersonators would go through a normal round-style performance, and the audience's votes were revealed at the end. At or near the end, there is usually a special performance featuring all of the impersonators or a special guest singer.

=== Doppel-Singer Music Festival ===
This event has happened twice in Hidden Singer history. Eight teams, each consisting of one singer and one impersonator who was a participant in the King of Kings Championship. (Note: Lyn's team was able to have two impersonators due to both being champions) Each team has two performances, the one where half is in a special two-room hidden stage, and the other half after the doors open and their positions are revealed. The audience and the other seven teams are challenged to find, the real singer. (Note: Lyn's team was originally her and Choi Woo-sung, but she did not participate in the first half of the first performance, and was replaced by Ahn Min-hee. It was revealed that she was not in the hidden stage during the second half) The second performance is the team alternating parts of a different song on the stage. After all eight teams have performed, the audience votes for their favorite team, and the winner is declared "Best Couple".

=== Other special episodes ===
Before some seasons, a special episode would air with the host and panel, featuring a collection of the best past performances, or the lineup prediction for the following season. The first, seventh, and eight seasons are the only ones to not have such an episode. In the fifth and sixth seasons, these were "Comeback Specials" and they featured highlights of the previous seasons as well as hearing quizzes, where six audio clips of songs would play, and the panel would guess which one was a real singer singing. The other five were impersonators. Hearing quizzes also happened during the Season 4 Doppel-Singer Music Festival and the Season 6 King of Kings Championship. At the end of Season 3, a special "All Three Seasons King of Kings Championship" was broadcast live. It worked similar to a Championship Final, expect there were ten contestants (the finalists from the past three seasons, except Kwak Dong-hyun). A special performance featuring the majority of champions from the three seasons appeared at the end. In the middle of Season 6, a Special Live Broadcast Quiz aired, which included a hearing quiz and a lineup prediction for the second half of Season 6.

== Season 1 ==
=== Regular episodes ===
List of regular episodes in season 1

Episode #	Air Date	Singer	Panel of Celebrities	Song	Round 1	Round 2	Round 3	Round 4		
Episode #	Air Date	Singer	Panel of Celebrities	Song	Round 1	Round 2	Round 3	Third place	Runner-up	Winner
1 (Pilot)	December 21, 2012	Park Jung-hyun	Yoo Young-seok, Lee Yoon-seok, Jang Dong-hyuk, Solbi, Onew (Shinee), She'z	R1: "I'll Write You a Letter" (편지할게요); R2: "I Hope It Would Be That Way Now" (이젠 그랬으면 좋겠네); R3: "My Day" (나의 하루); R4: "In the Dream" (꿈에)	Im Ji-soo	Park Seul-gi	Cheon Ga-yeon	Kim Ji-seon	Oh Ha-neul	Park Jung-hyun
2 (Pilot)	December 28, 2012	Kim Kyung-ho	Joo Young-hoon, Kim Young-chul, Son Ho-young (g.o.d), Solbi, Girl's Day (Sojin, Minah)	R1: "People Who Make Me Sorrow" (나를 슬프게 하는 사람들); R2: "Even Though I Loved" (사랑했지만); R3: "Forbidden Love" (금지된 사랑); R4: "Heartless" (비정)	Kim Hyun-cheol	Seol Min-ji (Female)	Lee Jae-yoon	Woo Hyung-gi	Kwak Dong-hyun	Kim Kyung-ho
3	March 16, 2013	Sung Si-kyung	Yoon Jong-shin, Bae Ki-sung (CAN), Jang Dong-hyuk, Solbi, f(x) (Victoria, Amber), VIXX, Kwak Dong-hyun	R1: "The Road to Me" (내게 오는 길); R2: "You Touched My Heart" (넌 감동이었어 ); R3: "We Make a Good Pair" (우린 제법 잘 어울려요); R4: "On the Street" (거리에서)	Jang Jae-ho	Go Hong-seok	Kim Gi-hyun	Park Sung-soo	Park Ji-hoon	Sung Si-kyung
4	March 23, 2013	Jo Kwanwoo	Jo Tong-dal, Geum Bo-ra, Joo Young-hoon, Solbi, CNBLUE (Jung Yong-hwa, Lee Jung-shin)	R1: "Flower Garden" (꽃밭에서); R2: "Swamp" (늪); R3: "If I Leave" (나 가거든); R4: "Because I Love You" (사랑했으므로)	Jo Hwi	Ji Seo-ryun	Lee Cheol-hee	Lee Won-seok	Kang Nam-soon	Jo Kwanwoo
5	March 30, 2013	Lee Soo-young	Yoo Young-seok, Danny Ahn (g.o.d), Lee Ki-chan, Jang Dong-hyuk, Solbi, ZE:A (Kevin, Dongjun)	R1: "I Believe"; R2: "Grace"; R3: "Fate" (인연); R4: "Whistle to Me" (휠릴리)	Choi Joo-ri	Kim Yu-jeong	Ha Eun-ji	Kim Jae-seon (Male)	Woo Yeon-soo	Lee Soo-young
6	April 6, 2013	Kim Jong-seo	Bang Eun-hee, Kim Kyung-ho, Danny Ahn (g.o.d), Jang Dong-hyuk, Kim Jeong-min, Sistar (Soyou, Dasom)	R1: "You Who Do Not Answer" (대답 없는 너); R2: "Beautiful Restriction" (아름다운 구속); R3: "Winter Rain" (겨울비); R4: "I Don't Know Yet" (지금은 알 수 없어)	Jung Geun-young	Lee Woong-hee	Choi Hyun-moo	Park Sang-woo	Lee Hyun-hak	Kim Jong-seo
7	April 13, 2013	Bobby Kim	Kim Sung-ryung, Lee Se-joon (Yurisangja), Eun Ji-won (Sechs Kies), Danny Ahn (g.o.d), Jang Dong-hyuk, Ailee, Han Groo; Special: Buga Kingz	R1: "Falling in Love Again" (고래의 꿈); R2: "An Alley" (골목길); R3: "Tic Tac Toe"; R4: "Love..That Guy" (사랑..그놈)	Ji Min-wook	Kim Soo-bin	Ahn Joon-yong	Hong Woo-jin	Paul Song	Bobby Kim
8	April 20, 2013	Jang Yun-jeong	Sunwoo Yong-nyeo, Joo Young-hoon, Lee Seon-jin, Jang Dong-hyuk, Solbi, Wink, MBLAQ (Seungho, Mir)	R1: "Oh My Goodness" (어머나); R2: "Flower" (꽃); R3: "Ollae" (올래); R4: "Evocation" (초혼)	Kim Jeong-won	Kim Seo-young	Lila	Kim Seon-myung	Oh Ye-joong	Jang Yun-jeong
9	April 27, 2013	Park Sang-min	Park Seung-hwa (Yurisangja), Jang Dong-hyuk, Lee Jung, Kim Ji-min, Kim Jeong-min, INFINITE (Dongwoo, Woohyun, Sungyeol)	R1: "One Love" (하나의 사랑); R2: "Sunflower" (해바라기); R3: "A Farewell to Arms" (무기여 잘있거라); R4: "My Love in Distant Memory" (멀어져 간 사람아)	Hanbyul	Lee Sang-won	Ahn Yoon-sang	Jeon Dae-won	Kim Young-hyun	Park Sang-min
10	May 4, 2013	Baek Ji-young	Joo Young-hoon, Kim Chang-ryeol (DJ DOC), Jang Dong-hyuk, Solbi, Huh Gak, Shin Bo-ra, B1A4 (Sandeul, Baro)	R1: "I Won't Love" (사랑 안해); R2: "Don't Forget" (잊지 말아요); R3: "Dash"; R4: "Like Being Hit by a Bullet" (총 맞은 것처럼)	Na Young-joo	Sook Haeng	Kim Song-yi	Kang Min-kyung	Park Hae-young	Baek Ji-young
11	May 11, 2013	Kim Jong-kook	Joo Young-hoon, Hong Seok-cheon, Jang Dong-hyuk, Kim Jong-min (Koyote), Kim Jeong-min, After School (Jooyeon, Raina, Nana)	R1: "December" (회상); R2: "Walking in One Spot" (제자리 걸음); R3: "Loveable" (사랑스러워); R4: "One Man" (한 남자)	Ham Yoo-sung	Seo Joon-gyo	K.Will	Yoo Young-min	Kim Byung-soo	Kim Jong-kook
12	May 18, 2013	Lee Moon-se	Park Hae-mi, Lee Se-joon (Yurisangja), Park Kyung-lim, Jang Dong-hyuk, Solbi, Shinee, Michelle Lee, Stellar	R1: "Gwanghwamun Love Song" (광화문 연가); R2: "Flying in the Deep Night" (깊은 밤을 날아서); R3: "Sunset Glow" (붉은 노을); R4: "Old Love" (옛 사랑)	Hwang Young-hoon	Bae Ki-sung	Kim Tae-geuk	Kim Jeong-hoon	Ahn Woong-gi	Lee Moon-se
13	May 25, 2013	Yoon Min-soo (Vibe)	Lee Han-wi, Bang Eun-hee, Kim Sook, Jang Dong-hyuk, Ryu Jae-hyun (Vibe), Jang Sung-kyu, Solbi, Shindong (Super Junior), Dal Shabet (Subin, Serri, Ah Young); Special: Yoo Seul-gi, Kang Min-kyung (Davichi)	R1: "Love Me Once Again" (미워도 다시 한 번); R2: "Drinking" (술이야); R3: "That Man, That Woman" (그 남자 그 여자); R4: "Comeback Again" (다시 와주라)	Jo Sung-beom	Hwang Gil-seon	Park Sang-moon	Choi In-sik	Kim Sung-wook	Yoon Min-soo
14	June 1, 2013	Kim Gun-mo	Kim Heung-gook, Joo Young-hoon, Lee Soo-geun, Kim Joon-hee, Jang Dong-hyuk, Jang Sung-kyu, Kim Jeong-min, Secret, Stellar (Gayoung, Hyoeun)	R1: "First Impression" (첫 인상); R2: "Love is Gone" (사랑이 떠나가네); R3: "Moon of Seoul" (서울의 달); R4: "Excuse" (핑계) + "Woman in the Rain" (빗속의 여인) + "A Bird Flew Over the Cuckoo's Nest" (뻐꾸기 둥지 위로 날아간 새)	Yoo Sung-hee	Kim Jin-wook	Shin Young-gwang	Kim Sung-hoon	Choi Dong-hwan	Kim Gun-mo
15	June 8, 2013	Legend of Hidden Singer Highlights								

Episode 15 (Highlights)

- Best 7 Performances
  - 1. (Park Jung-hyun's part) – "I'll Write You A Letter" (편지할게요)
  - 2. (Kim Jong-seo's part) – "Beautiful Restriction" (아름다운 구속)
  - 3. (Lee Soo-young's part) – "Grace"
  - 4. (Park Sang-min's part) – "A Farewell to Arms" (무기여 잘 있거라)
  - 5. (Kim Jong-kook's part) – "Walking in One Spot" (제자리걸음)
  - 6. (Lee Moon-se's part) – "Flying in the Deep Night" (깊은 밤을 날아서)
  - 7. (Yoon Min-soo's part) – "Comeback Again" (다시 와주라)
- Special Voice Imitation Skills
  - ""Pretty Man Kim Jong-seo" Park Sang-woo (Kim Jong-seo's part)
  - "18-year-old Jang Yun-jeong" Lila (Jang Yun-jeong's part)
  - "Invitation Singer Kim Gun-mo" Choi Dong-hwan (Kim Gun-mo's part)
  - "Lee Moon-se's Voice Doppelganger" Ahn Woong-gi (Lee Moon-se's part)
  - "Celebrity Voice Imitation Terminator" Ahn Yoon-sang (Park Sang-min's part)
  - "Musician's Voice Imitation King" K.Will (Kim Jong-kook's part)
- Best 5 Participants
  - 1. "Little Park Jung-hyun" Oh Ha-neul (Park Jung-hyun's part)
  - 2. "Jinju Kim Kyung-ho" Kwak Dong-hyun (Kim Kyung-ho's part)
  - 3. "Male Lee Soo-young" Kim Jae-seon (Lee Soo-young's part)
  - 4. "Broadcasting Screenwriter Jang Yun-jeong" Kim Seon-myung (Jang Yun-jeong's part)
  - 5. "Meat Restaurant Lee Moon-se" Kim Jeong-hoon (Lee Moon-se's part)

=== King of Kings' Challenge ===
King of Hidden Singer in season 1

Episode #	Air date	Panel		Participants		
16–17	June 15, 2013 – June 22, 2013	Kim Kyung-ho, Solbi, Jang Dong-hyuk, Tae Jin-ah, T-ara, Joo Young-hoon, Park Sang-min, Park Eun-ji, Lee Soo-young, Jo Kwan-woo, Dongjun (ZE:A), Kyungri (Nine Muses); Special: Jeon Dae-won, Ahn Yoon-sang		The regular episodes' last survivors (excluded the singers)		
16–17	Group A					
16–17	Stage #	Participant	Singer	Song	Votes (out of 300)	Rank
16–17	1	Kwak Dong-hyun	Kim Kyung-ho	"Heartless" (비정)	233	1
16–17	2	Kim Young-hyun	Park Sang-min	"One Love" (하나의 사랑)	79	5
16–17	3	Choi Dong-hwan	Kim Gun-mo	"A Bird Flew Over the Cuckoo's Nest" (뻐꾸기 둥지 위로 날아간 새)	216	2
16–17	4	Oh Ha-neul	Park Jung-hyun	"I'll Write You A Letter" (편지할게요)	135	4
16–17	5	Kang Nam-soon	Jo Kwan-woo	"Swamp" (늪)	138	3
16–17	Park Sang-min's re-challenge (Note: This part didn't count toward the main match's result.)					
16–17	Room #	Singer & Participant		Song	Vote (out of 264)	
16–17	1	Jeon Dae-won		"A Farewell to Arms" (무기여 잘있거라)	42	
16–17	2	Park Sang-min		"A Farewell to Arms" (무기여 잘있거라)	79	
16–17	3	Kim Young-hyun		"A Farewell to Arms" (무기여 잘있거라)	125	
16–17	4	Ahn Yoon-sang		"A Farewell to Arms" (무기여 잘있거라)	15	
16–17	Stage #	Participant	Singer	Song	Votes (out of 300)	Rank
16–17	Group B					
16–17	1	Kim Byung-soo	Kim Jong-kook	"One Man" (한 남자)	64	5
16–17	2	Ahn Woong-gi	Lee Moon-se	"Old Love" (옛 사랑)	242	1
16–17	3	Park Hae-young	Baek Ji-young	"I Won't Love" (사랑 안해)	112	4
16–17	4	Lee Hyun-hak	Kim Jong-seo	"Beautiful Restriction" (아름다운 구속)	191	3
16–17	5	Paul Song	Bobby Kim	"Tic Tac Toe"	239	2
16–17	Group C					
16–17	1	Woo Yeon-soo	Lee Soo-young	"Grace"	223	1
16–17	2	Kim Sung-wook	Yoon Min-soo	"Piled Up with Longing" (그리움만 쌓이네)	223	1
16–17	3	Park Ji-hoon	Sung Si-kyung	"We Make a Good Pair" (우린 제법 잘 어울려요)	166	3
16–17	4	Oh Ye-joong	Jang Yun-jeong	"Evocation" (초혼)	144	4
16–17	Final					
16–17	Stage #	Participant	Singer	Song	Votes (/300)	Rank
16–17	1	(Group A) Kwak Dong-hyun's highlight video			31	Fourth place
16–17	2	(Group B) Ahn Woong-gi's highlight video			157	Winner
16–17	3	(Group C) Woo Yeon-soo's highlight video			45	Third place
16–17	4	(Group C) Kim Sung-wook's highlight video			51	Runner-up
16–17	Choral of 14 participants: "A Goose's Dream" (거위의 꿈; Carnival)					

== Season 2 ==
=== Special episodes ===
List of special episodes in season 2

Hidden Singer 2 D-14 (aired on September 28, 2013)

- Season 1's Best 5 "Want to See Again"
  - 1. Park Jung-hyun's round 1
  - 2. Lee Soo-young's round 2
  - 3. Kim Jong-kook's round 2
  - 4. Lee Moon-se's round 2
  - 5. Yoon Min-soo's round 4
- Best 5 Participants
  - 1. "Little Park Jung-hyun" Oh Ha-neul
  - 2. "Jinju Kim Kyung-ho" Kwak Dong-hyun
  - 3. "Male Lee Soo-young" Kim Jae-seon
  - 4. "Broadcasting Screenwriter Jang Yun-jeong" Kim Seon-myung
  - 5. "Meat Restaurant Lee Moon-se" Kim Jeong-hoon
- Season 1: King of Kings' Challenge's Best Performances
  - 1. Kwak Dong-hyun – "Heartless" (비정)
  - 2. Ahn Woong-gi – "Old Love" (옛 사랑)
  - 3. Kim Sung-wook – "Piled Up with Longing" (그리움만 쌓이네)
  - 4. Choral of 14 participants – "A Goose's Dream" (거위의 꿈)

Hidden Singer 2 D-7 (aired on October 5, 2013)

- Cast
  - MC: Jun Hyun-moo, Park Ji-yoon
  - Panel: Joo Young-hoon, Kang Yong-suk, Kim Kyung-ho, Park Hae-mi, Jang Dong-hyuk, Solbi, Muzie
  - Participant: Oh Ha-neul, Kwak Dong-hyun, Kang Nam-soon, Woo Yeon-soo, Lee Hyun-hak, Paul Song, Oh Ye-joong, Kim Young-hyun, Park Hae-young, Kim Byung-soo, Ahn Woong-gi, Kim Sung-wook, Choi Dong-hwan
- Ssulzun in Hidden Singer
  - Season 2's line-up prediction: Kim Bum-soo, Nam Jin, Park Hyo-shin, Byun Jin-sub, BoA, Shin Seung-hun, IU, Yang Hee-eun, Yoon Do-hyun, Lee So-ra, Lee Seung-chul, Lee Seung-hwan, Lee Sun-hee, Lee Juck, Yim Jae-beom, Im Chang-jung, Jo Sung-mo, Cho Yong-pil, Joo Hyun-mi, Wheesung

=== Regular episodes ===
List of regular episodes in season 2

Episode #	Air Date	Singer	Panel of Celebrities	Song	Round 1	Round 2	Round 3	Round 4		
Episode #	Air Date	Singer	Panel of Celebrities	Song	Round 1	Round 2	Round 3	Third place	Runner-up	Winner
1 (Note: There are six (instead of five) participants for this episode, so the original singer did not participate in the first round. Thus, two participants were eliminated in the second round.)	October 12, 2013	Im Chang-jung	Joo Young-hoon, Kim Sung-ryung, Park Hyo-joo, Kim Sung-soo, Kim Chang-yeol (DJ Doc), Solbi, Hwang Kwanghee, 2Eyes	R1: "It Looks Like You" (날 닮은 너); R2: "Gone with the Wind" (바람과 함께 사라지다); R3: "Again" (그때 또 다시); R4: "A Shot of Soju" (소주 한 잔)	So Won	Huh Gak, Kim Bit-na-la,	Lee Jae-eon	Kim Dae-san	Jo Hyun-min	Im Chang-jung
2	October 19, 2013	Shin Seung-hun	Kim Kyung-ho, Park So-hyun, Kang Yong-suk, Kang In-joon, Solbi, Han Groo, Luna (f(x)), Dana (The Grace), Don Spike, Jang Dong-hyuk	R1: "I Believe"; R2: "As the First Feeling" (처음 그 느낌처럼); R3: "Your Smile in My Memory" (미소 속에 비친 그대); R4: "Invisible Love" (보이지 않는 사랑)	Shin Dong-hwan	Baek Gi-soo	Han Kyung-il	Lee Hyun-kyung	Shin Seung-hun	Jang Jin-ho
3	October 26, 2013	Jo Sung-mo	Joo Young-hoon, Noh Sa-yeon, Ryu Tae-joon, Shin Ji (Koyote), Solbi, MayBee, T-ara (Eunjung, Hyomin)	R1: "Do You Know" (아시나요); R2: "To Heaven"; R3: "By Your Side" (너의 곁으로); R4: "For Your Soul" (슬픈 영혼식)	Park Sang-woo	Jo Sung-mo (Note: When the original singer is eliminated in round 2, they stay in rounds 3 and 4, (with null votes) and two impersonators with the most number of votes are eliminated in round 3 to have three people in the final round.)	Kim Joo-han, Oh Hyun-taek	—N/a	Oh Joong-hwan	Im Sung-hyun (Note: Jo Sung-mo won the most number of votes but because he was eliminated before, Im Sung-hyun became the final winner.)
4	November 2, 2013	Kim Bum-soo	Joo Young-hoon, Yoon Il-sang, Hyun Mi, Kim Jeong-min, Lee Eun-hee, Jo Hye-young, Lady Jane, Ladies' Code, Pure (Black Jimin, Pink Chanhwee, Yellow Younghoo)	R1: "Once Upon a Day" (하루); R2: "Appear" (나타나); R3: "I Miss You" (보고 싶다); R4: "Last Love" (끝사랑)	Nam Hoon-woo	Kim Joo-wan	Lee Beom-sik	Kim Chang-hoon	Jeon Cheol-min	Kim Bum-soo
5	November 9, 2013	Joo Hyun-mi	Joo Young-hoon, Lee Bong-won, Solbi, Hong Jin-young, Han Young, Haha, Mino, Danny Ahn (g.o.d), 2Eyes (Hyangsook, Dasom, Daeun)	R1: "The Man in Sinsa-dong" (신사동 그 사람); R2: "Unrequited Love" (짝사랑); R3: "Tears of the Bruce" (눈물의 부르스); R4: "Rainy Youngdong Bridge" (비 내리는 영동교)	Min Hye-young	(China) Park Ae-hwa	Bae Ah-hyun	Han Soo-young	Choi Yoo-kyung	Joo Hyun-mi
6	November 16, 2013	Yoon Do-hyun	Kim Kyung-ho, Lee Soo-young, Kim Jeong-min, Sojin (Girl's Day), Shinee (Jonghyun, Key, Taemin), Jang Dong-hyuk	R1: "After Sending You" (너를 보내고); R2: "A Flying Butterfly" (나는 나비); R3: "I'll Forget You" (잊을께); R4: "Love Two" (사랑 Two)	Jo Jae-il	Yoo Ho-jin	Seo Jeong-yong	Jang Ji-won	Jo Yool	Yoon Do-hyun
7	November 23, 2013	IU	Yoo Young-seok, Solbi, Jo Gap-kyung, Hong Seok-hee, Kang Sung-jin, Lee Hyun-young, Chun Myung-hoon, Byun Gi-soo, BIGSTAR	R1: "Boo"; R2: "Good Day" (좋은 날); R3: "You and I" (너랑 나); R4: "Only I Didn't Know" (나만 몰랐던 이야기)	Jeon Ah-hyun	(United Kingdom) Anna	Kim Mi-hyun	—N/a	Kim Yeon-joon, (United Kingdom) Shannon	IU
8	November 30, 2013	Nam Jin	Kim Kyung-ho, Park Hae-mi, Park Hyun-bin, Kim Jeong-min, 4Minute (Jiyoon, Gayoon, Woo Hyun, Byun Gi-soo	R1: "Brokenhearted" (가슴 아프게); R2: "With You" (님과 함께); R3: "Nest" (둥지); R4: "Empty Glass" (빈잔)	Jung Jong-gi	Choi Wook	Jo Hyun-nam	Jeon Chan-young	Kim Soo-chan	Nam Jin
9	December 7, 2013	Wheesung	Joo Young-hoon, Tae Jin-ah, Gummy, K.Will, Moon Myung-jin, Solbi, Gong Seo-young, Jang Dong-hyuk, Nam Chang-hee, Jo Se-ho; Special: Shorry J (Mighty Mouth)	R1: "With Me"; R2: "Can't We" (안되나요); R3: "Heartsore Story" (가슴 시린 이야기); R4: "I Even Thought of Marriage" (결혼까지 생각했어)	Je Cheong	Daison	Park Young-tak	Park Joon-young	Kim Jin-ho	Wheesung
10	December 14, 2013	Park Jin-young	Joo Young-hoon, Lee Bong-won, Kim Won-hee, Kim Jeong-min, Miss A (Min, Fei, Jia), Lee Ji-hye, Lee Ki-chan	R1: "Don't Leave Me" (날 떠나지마); R2: "Honey"; R3: "Summer Jingle Bell" (썸머 징글벨); R4: "Behind You" (너의 뒤에서)	Byun Jae-min	Kang Kyun-sung	Park Sung-jin	Kim Nam-jong	Lee Sang-taek	Park Jin-young
11	December 21, 2013	Kim Yoon-ah	Kim Kyung-ho, Lee Kye-in, Song Eun-i, Kim Hyung-gyu, Jaurim (Goo Tae-hoon, Lee Seon-kyu, Kim Jin-man), MC Gree, Kim You-jung, Jo Ah-ran, Sunny Hill, Jang Dong-hyuk, J-Walk, Tasty	R1: "Fan" (팬이야); R2: "Magic Carpet Ride" (매직 카펫 라이드); R3: "Hey Hey Hey"; R4: "Nocturne" (야상곡)	Park Yoo-jin	Kwon Hyun-jin	Rael	Yook Hyo-seon	Jang Seo-yoon	Kim Yoon-ah
12	December 28, 2013	Late Kim Kwang-seok (Note: Voice appearance)	Kim Chang-gi, Han Dong-joon, Joo Young-hoon, Lee Se-joon (Yurisangja), Bang Eun-hee, Kim Sung-kyung, Park Gun-hyung, Kim Ye-won, Kim Seul-gi, Kim Jeong-min, Apink (Jung Eun-ji, Yoon Bo-mi, Oh Ha-young), NC.A, F.T. Island (Lee Hong-gi, Lee Jae-jin), Hong Dae-gwang, Jang Dong-hyuk	R1: "Becoming Dust" (먼지가 되어); R2: "My Song" (나의 노래); R3: "A Car That Goes on Two Wheels" (두 바퀴로 가는 자동차); R4: "Around Thirty" (서른 즈음에)	Ryoo Jeong-hwan	Jin Ho-hyun	Lee Kyung-yong	Chae Hwan	Choi Seung-yeol	Kim Kwang-seok
13	January 4, 2014	Highlights and King of Kings' Challenge's preparation								

=== King of Kings' Challenge ===
King of Hidden Singer in season 2

Semifinals

Episode #	Air date	Panel		Participants		
14–15	January 11, 2014 – January 18, 2014	Joo Young-hoon, Kim Kyung-ho, Nam Jin, Wheesung, Yoon Min-soo, Solbi, Lee Se-joon (Yurisangja), Song Eun-i, Shorry J (Mighty Mouth), Secret (Jun Hyo-seong, Jung Ha-na), Gong Seo-young, NC.A		The regular episodes' last survivors (excluded the singers)		
14–15	Stage #	Participant	Singer	Song	Votes (out of 300)	Rank
14–15	Group A					
14–15	1	Kim Yeon-joon	IU	"You and I" (너랑 나)	109	4
14–15	2	Jang Jin-ho	Shin Seung-hun	"Your Smile in My Memory" (미소 속에 비친 그대)	239	3
14–15	3	Jeon Cheol-min	Kim Bum-soo	"Last Love" (끝사랑)	241	2
14–15	4	Jo Hyun-min	Im Chang-jung	"A Shot of Soju" (소주 한 잔)	285	1
14–15	Group B					
14–15	1	Im Sung-hyun	Jo Sung-mo	For Your Soul	243	1
14–15	2	Jang Seo-yoon	Kim Yoon-ah	"Nocturne" (야상곡)	80	5
14–15	3	Kim Soo-chan	Nam Jin	"Empty Glass" (빈잔)	221	3
14–15	4	Jo Yool	Yoon Do-hyun	"A Flying Butterfly" (나는 나비)	234	2
14–15	5	Shannon	IU	"Good Day" (좋은 날)	183	4
14–15	Group C					
14–15	1	Kim Jin-ho	Wheesung	"Heartsore Story" (가슴 시린 이야기)	278	1
14–15	2	Choi Seung-yeol	Late Kim Kwang-seok	"Although I Loved You" (사랑했지만)	239	2
14–15	3	Choi Yoo-kyung	Joo Hyun-mi	"Unrequited Love" (짝사랑) "The Man in Sinsa-dong" (신사동 그 사람)	191	3
14–15	4	Lee Sang-taek	J. Y. Park	"Behind You" (너의 뒤에서)	81	4
14–15	Choral of 13 participants: "The Magic Castle" (마법의 성; The Classic)					

Final (live broadcast)

Episode #	Air date	Panel		Participants		
16	January 25, 2014	Joo Young-hoon, Im Chang-jung, Wheesung, Greg, Shannon, Jeon Cheol-min		The groups' first place in the semifinals		
16	Stage #	Participant	Singer	Song	Votes (out of 864,868)	Rank
16	1	Jo Hyun-min	Im Chang-jung	"Again" (그때 또 다시)	318,938 (36.9%)	Runner-up
16	2	Im Sung-hyun	Jo Sung-mo	"Do You Know" (아시나요)	176,556 (20.4%)	Third place
16	3	Kim Jin-ho	Wheesung	"I Even Thought of Marriage" (결혼까지 생각했어)	369,374 (42.7%)	Winner
Special performance: Season 1's finalists (Note: Except for Kwak Dong-hyun)
Special performance: Kim Kwang-seok's impersonators (Note: Except for Ryu Jung-hwan)- "A Letter From a Private" (이등병의 편지)

== Season 3 ==
=== Special episodes ===
List of special episodes in season 3
- Hidden Singer Begins 1 (aired on August 2, 2014)
- Hidden Singer Begins 2 (aired on August 9, 2014)
- Hidden Singer Lee Sun-hee Special (Episode 0; aired on August 16, 2014)

=== Regular episodes ===
List of regular episodes in season 3

Episode #	Air Date	Singer	Panel of Celebrities	Song	Round 1	Round 2	Round 3	Round 4		
Episode #	Air Date	Singer	Panel of Celebrities	Song	Round 1	Round 2	Round 3	Third place	Runner-up	Winner
1	August 23, 2014	Lee Sun-hee	Joo Young-hoon, Song Eun-i, Cha Tae-hyun, Lee Se-joon (Yurisangja), Hong Kyung-min, Lee Young-ha, Heo Ji-woong, Kim Do-hoon, Ryu Jae-young, Gong Seo-young, Mamamoo, Ben, ZE:A (Kevin, Dongjun)	R1: "To J" (J에게); R2: "Fate" (인연); R3: "Beautiful Country" (아름다운 강산); R4: "Meet Him Among Them" (그 중에 그대를 만나)	Jung Da-ae	Choi Jin-hyang	Kim Ha-young	Jung Mi-ae	Kim Won-joo	Lee Sun-hee
2	August 30, 2014	Lee Jae-hoon (Cool)	Jeong Jun-ha, Song Eun-i, Oh Hyun-kyung, Kim Sung-soo (Cool), Yoon Il-sang, Shin Ji (Koyote), Soyou (Sistar), AOA (Choa, Jimin, Yuna), The Hidden	R1: "Sorrow" (애상); R2: "Fate" (운명); R3: "Aloha" (아로하); R4: "Before Sadness Comes" (슬퍼지려 하기전에)	Han Sang-hoon	Bang Chang-yong	Im Si-won	Lee Dong-geun	Im Jae-yong	Lee Jae-hoon
3	September 6, 2014	Park Hyun-bin	Joo Young-hoon, Sunwoo Yong-nyeo, Seol Woon-do, Lee Yoon-ji, Subin (Dal Shabet), Gong Seo-young, Jung Sung-eul, Jung Jin-hyang, Jang Sung-kyu, Song Min-gyo, NC.A, Seo Ji-oh, Hong Won-bin, Enes Kaya, Julian Quintart	R1: "Just Trust Me" (오빠만 믿어); R2: "Dead Drunk" (곤드레 만드레); R3: "So Hot!" (앗! 뜨거); R4: "Shabang Shabang" (샤방샤방)	Ahn Hee-jae	Hwang Bo-yeon	Kim Hyung-joon	Jang Young-dae	Kim Jae-hyun	Park Hyun-bin
4	September 13, 2014	Hwanhee (Fly to the Sky)	Joo Young-hoon, Hyun Mi, Brian (Fly to the Sky), Muzie, Cheon Yi-seul, Song Eun-i, Byun Gi-soo, BESTie, Christina Confalonieri, Myname (Chae-jin, In-soo, Se-yong)	R1: "Sea of Love"; R2: "Even Though My Heart Aches" (가슴 아파도); R3: "Missing You"; R4: "Like a Man" (남자답게)	Hwang Eui-hyun	Park Ji-hoon	Kim Seung-yeon	Shin Hee-seop	Park Min-gyu	Hwanhee
5	September 20, 2014	Taeyeon (Girls' Generation)	Girls' Generation (Tiffany, Hyoyeon, Yuri, Seohyun), Lee Se-joon (Yurisangja), Song Eun-i, Lee Kye-in, Yoo Se-yoon, Yoo Sang-moo, Red Velvet, Jo Hyun-min	R1: "If" (만약에); R2: "Gee"; R3: "Twinkle"; R4: "Can You Hear Me" (들리나요...)	Jung Yeon-joo	Taeyeon	Im Soo-hyun, Park Sung-mi	—N/a	Kang Si-ra	Kim Hwan-hee (Note: Taeyeon won the most number of votes but because she was eliminated before, Kim Hwan-hee became the final winner.)
6	September 27, 2014	Tae Jin-ah	Joo Young-hoon, Park Won-sook, Kwon Oh-joong, Jang Dong-min, Kim Sae-rom, Yoon Young-mi, Sung Jin-woo, Shorry J (Mighty Mouth), Teen Top (Chunji, Niel, L.Joe), Kim Jin-ho, Kim Soo-chan	R1: "Companion" (동반자); R2: "Not Everyone Can Fall in Love" (사랑은 아무나 하나); R3: "Ok Kyung-i" (옥경이); R4: "Mother" (사모곡)	Do Dong-hyun	Kim Dae-san	Jeon Tae-won	Min Soo-hyun	Kim Young-nam	Tae Jin-ah
7	October 4, 2014	Lee Juck	Kim Jong-jin (Bom Yeoreum Gaeul Kyeoul), Noh Sa-yeon, Song Eun-i, Davichi, John Park, Jo Moon-geun, Choi Hee, Park Se-mi (Jewelry), Kangnam (M.I.B), Ahn Young-min, Sam Hammington, Sam Okyere, Yoko Miho (via phone): Yoo Jae-suk	R1: "It's Fortunate" (다행이다); R2: "Left-handed" (왼손잡이); R3: "Running in the Sky" (하늘을 달리다); R4: "Lie Lie Lie" (거짓말 거짓말 거짓말)	Lee Dong-joon	Go Myung-yoon	Moon Chan-hee	Bae Seung-hyun	KoN	Lee Juck
8	October 11, 2014	Insooni	Bom Yeoreum Gaeul Kyeoul, Joo Young-hoon, Kim Tae-woo (g.o.d), Jo Hye-ryun, Song Eun-i, Secret (Jun Hyo-seong, Song Ji-eun), Gong Seo-young, Topp Dogg (B-Joo, P-Goon, Nakta), The Hidden; Special: Cho PD	R1: "Night After Night" (밤이면 밤마다); R2: "A Goose's Dream" (거위의 꿈); R3: "My Friend" (친구여); R4: "Father" (아버지)	Shin Ji-hye	Jung Chae-rin	Kim Bo-kyung	Kwon Yoon-mi	Yang Jeong-eun	Insooni
9	October 18, 2014	Yoon Jong-shin	Jang Ho-il, Sung Si-kyung, Chin Jung-kwon, Kim Sung-kyung, Kim Jeong-min, Juniel, Jang Hang-jun, Kim Ki-bang, Ahn Mi-na, Jo Jung-chi, Eddy Kim, Puer Kim, Lee Hyun-kyung; Special: Swings	R1: "My Love Ugly" (내 사랑 못난이); R2: "Rebirth" (환생); R3: "Instinctively" (본능적으로); R4: "One Day Long Ago" (오래전 그날)	Jeon Young-joo	Lee Hwan-hee	Shin Hyun-sik	In Eun-bae	Choi Hyung-seok	Yoon Jong-shin
10	October 25, 2014	Lee Seung-hwan	Bom Yeoreum Gaeul Kyeoul, Joo Young-hoon, Song Eun-i, Ahn Young-mi, Ailee, Kim Joon-hee, Lim Kim, Seok Joo-il, Jang Dong-hyuk, Jung Ji-chan, Shannon, T-ara (Eunjung, Hyomin, Soyeon, TOP.IC	R1: "A Thousand Days" (천일동안); R2: "Like the Love Spread Around the World" (세상에 뿌려진 사랑만큼); R3: "I Ask" (물어본다); R4: "How Love Is" (어떻게 사랑이 그래요)	Kim Yong-gyu	Jung Dong-won	Lee Byung-geol	Goo Ja-yoon	Lee Seung-hwan	Kim Young-gwan
11	November 1, 2014	Kim Tae-woo (g.o.d)	g.o.d (Joon Park, Danny Ahn, Son Ho-young), Gong Hyung-jin, Joo Young-hoon, Kim Kyung-ho, Lee Ji-yeon, Gong Jeong-hyuk, Han Young, Megan Lee, Apink (Yoon Bo-mi, Oh Ha-young), AOA (Choa, Seolhyun, Chanmi), Jang Dong-hyuk, Choi Dong-hwan	R1: "Dreaming Dream" (꿈을 꾸다); R2: "High High"; R3: "Lie" (거짓말); R4: "Love Rain" (사랑비)	Im Geon-min	Jang Joon-hyuk	Kim Min-woo	Seon Ji-hoon	Kim Hong-young	Kim Tae-woo
12	November 8, 2014	Highlights and King of Kings' Challenge's preparation								

=== King of Kings' Challenge ===
King of Hidden Singer in season 3

Semifinals

Episode #	Air date	Panel		Participants		
13–14	November 15, 2014 – November 22, 2014	Joo Young-hoon, Yang Hee-eun, Lee Jae-hoon, Hwanhee, Kim Won-hee, Kim Min-hee, Jang Dong-hyuk, Song Eun-i, Huh Gak, Girl's Day (Sojin, Yura)		The regular episodes' last survivors (excluded the singers)		
13–14	Stage #	Participant	Singer	Song	Votes (out of 300)	Rank
13–14	Group A					
13–14	1	Kim Won-joo	Lee Sun-hee	"Fate" (인연)	206	2
13–14	2	Kim Jae-hyun	Park Hyun-bin	"So Hot!" (앗! 뜨거)	269	1
13–14	3	Kim Hong-young	Kim Tae-woo	"Love Rain" (사랑비)	96	4
13–14	4	KoN	Lee Juck	"Lie Lie Lie" (거짓말 거짓말 거짓말)	147	3
13–14	Group B					
13–14	1	Im Jae-yong	Lee Jae-hoon	"Sorrow" (애상)	271	2 (audiences' wildcard)
13–14	2	Park Min-gyu	Hwanhee	"Like a Man" (남자답게)	280	1
13–14	3	Choi Hyung-seok	Yoon Jong-shin	"One Day Long Ago" (오래전 그날)	154	4
13–14	4	Kim Young-nam	Tae Jin-ah	"Mother" (사모곡)	165	3
13–14	Group C					
13–14	1	Kim Young-gwan	Lee Seung-hwan	"How Love Is" (어떻게 사랑이 그래요)	237	1
13–14	2	Kim Hwan-hee	Taeyeon	"Can You Hear Me" (들리나요)	149	2
13–14	3	Yang Jeong-eun	Insooni	"Father" (아버지)	104	3
13–14	Choral of Yang Hee-eun and 11 participants: "Beautiful Things" (아름다운 것들) + "Evergreen Tree" (상록수) + "Think of You" (당신 생각)					

Final (live broadcast)

Episode #	Air date	Panel		Participants		
15	November 29, 2014	Joo Young-hoon, Park Hyun-bin, Lee Seung-hwan, Lee Jae-hoon, Sistar (Soyou, Bora), Gong Seo-young, Song Eun-i, Bom Yeoreum Gaeul Kyeoul, Shannon		The groups' first place and the audiences' wildcard in the semifinals		
15	Stage #	Participant	Singer	Song	Votes (out of 567,234)	Rank
15	1	Kim Jae-hyun	Park Hyun-bin	"Just Trust Me" (오빠만 믿어)	53,533 (9.4%)	Fourth place
15	2	Im Jae-yong	Lee Jae-hoon	"Fate" (운명)	119,716 (21.1%)	Third place
15	3	Kim Young-gwan	Lee Seung-hwan	"Live a Long Long Time" (그대가 그대를)	182,990 (32.3%)	Runner-up
15	4	Park Min-gyu	Hwanhee	"Tomorrow"	210,995 (37.2%)	Winner

=== All three seasons' King of Kings' Challenge ===
King of Hidden Singer in three seasons

Episode #	Air date	Panel		Participants		
16	December 6, 2014	Joo Young-hoon, Lee Jae-hoon, Hwanhee, Jo Sung-mo, Lee Soo-young, AOA (Choa, Yuna, Hyejeong), Song Eun-i, Solbi		All three seasons' "King of Kings' Challenge"'s finalists		
16	Stage #	Participant	Singer	Song	Votes (out of 816,597)	Rank
16	1	Ahn Woong-gi	Lee Moon-se	"Old Love" (옛 사랑)		
16	2	Im Jae-yong	Lee Jae-hoon	"Before Sadness Comes" (슬퍼지려 하기전에)		
16	3	Jo Hyun-min	Im Chang-jung	"Ordinary Song" (흔한 노래)	135,088 (16.5%)	Runner-up
16	4	Woo Yeon-soo	Lee Soo-young	"Whistle to Me" (휠릴리)		
16	5	Kim Jae-hyun	Park Hyun-bin	"Shabang Shabang" (샤방샤방)		
16	6	Kim Jin-ho	Wheesung	"Heartsore Story" (가슴 시린 이야기) (Feat. Ilhoon (BtoB))		
16	7	Kim Young-gwan	Lee Seung-hwan	"A Thousand Days" (천일동안)	123,426 (15.1%)	Third place
16	8	Kim Sung-wook	Yoon Min-soo	"Drinking" (술이야)		
16	9	Im Sung-hyun	Jo Sung-mo	"A Thorn Tree" (가시나무)		
16	10	Park Min-gyu	Hwanhee	"Missing You"	138,917 (17.0%)	Winner
16	Choral of all three seasons' "King of Kings' Challenge"'s participants: (Note: Except Kwak Dong-hyun, Choi Dong-hwan, Shannon, and Jang Seo-yoon) "Being Together" (하나되어; Various artists)					

== Season 4 ==
=== Special episodes ===
List of special episodes in season 4
- Best performances of Hidden Singer 1 picked by JTBC anchors (aired on September 4, 2015)
- Best performances of Hidden Singer 2 picked by Please Take Care of My Refrigerator team (aired on September 11, 2015)
- Best performances of Hidden Singer 3 picked by Non-Summit members (aired on September 18, 2015)

Doppel-singer Music Festival

Air date	Panel			Participants		
September 26, 2015 – September 27, 2015	Joo Young-hoon, Byun Jin-sub, Song Eun-i, Kim Sook, Koyote (Kim Jong-min, Bbaek Ga), Huh Gak, Girl's Day (Sojin, Yura); Special: Shin Ji (Koyote), Cool (Kim Sung-soo, Yuri)			Season 1: Woo Yeon-soo, Oh Ye-joong, Kim Sung-wook; Season 2: Jo Hyun-min, Kim Jin-ho; Season 3: Im Jae-yong, Park Min-gyu, Kim Young-gwan		
September 26, 2015 – September 27, 2015	Stage #	Participant	Singer	First performance	Second performance	Result (voted by 300 audiences)
September 26, 2015 – September 27, 2015	1	Park Min-gyu	Hwanhee	"Even Though My Heart Aches" (가슴 아파도)	"Sea of Love"	
September 26, 2015 – September 27, 2015	2	Im Jae-yong	Lee Jae-hoon	"Sorrow" (애상) (Feat. Kim Sung-soo & Yuri)	"Before Sadness Comes" (슬퍼지려 하기전에) (Feat. Koyote)	
September 26, 2015 – September 27, 2015	3	Oh Ye-joong	Jang Yun-jeong	"Evocation" (초혼)	"Sticking Plaster" (반창고)	
September 26, 2015 – September 27, 2015	4	Jo Hyun-min	Im Chang-jung	"A Shot of Soju" (소주 한 잔)	"Love Again" (또 다시 사랑)	Winner
September 26, 2015 – September 27, 2015	5	Kim Jin-ho	Wheesung	"I Even Thought of Marriage" (결혼까지 생각했어)	"Insomnia"	
September 26, 2015 – September 27, 2015	6	Woo Yeon-soo	Lee Soo-young	"Whistle to Me" (휠릴리)	"A Love to Kill" (이 죽일놈의 사랑) (Feat. Kim Jae-seon)	
September 26, 2015 – September 27, 2015	7	Kim Sung-wook	Yoon Min-soo	"Love Me Once Again" (미워도 다시 한 번)	"Are You Crazy?" (미친거니)	
September 26, 2015 – September 27, 2015	8	Kim Young-gwan	Lee Seung-hwan	"How Love Is" (어떻게 사랑이 그래요)	"That One Person" (그 한 사람)	

=== Regular episodes ===
List of regular episodes in season 4

Episode #	Air Date	Singer	Panel of Celebrities	Song	Round 1	Round 2	Round 3	Round 4		
Episode #	Air Date	Singer	Panel of Celebrities	Song	Round 1	Round 2	Round 3	Third place	Runner-up	Winner
1	October 3, 2015	BoA	Joo Young-hoon, Ahn Moon-sook, Kim Min-jong, Hong Seok-cheon, Lee Won-il, Sunny (Girls' Generation), Key (Shinee), Suho (EXO), Goo Hara, Baek A-yeon, Sayuri Fujita	R1: "ID; Peace B"; R2: "No.1"; R3: "Valenti"; R4: "Only One"	Ji In-seon	Shin Jin-ah	Kim So-yeon	Moon Ye-seul	Seo Young-seo	BoA
2	October 10, 2015	Kim Jin-ho (SG Wannabe)	Joo Young-hoon, Sunwoo Yong-nyeo, SG Wannabe (Kim Yong-jun, Lee Seok-hoon), Song Eun-i, Kim Sook, Choi Hee, Jo Young-soo, Park Seung-hi, AOA (Choa, Jimin, Hyejeong), Kim Jin-ho, Jo Hyun-min	R1: "Timeless"; R2: "Partner for Life" (내 사람); R3: "Lalala" (라라라); R4: "As We Live" (살다가)	Kim Kang-jin	Kim Jin-ho	Na Yong-woon, Bae Doo-hoon	—N/a	Im Gyu-hwan	Kim Jeong-joon
3	October 17, 2015	Min Kyung-hoon (Buzz)	Joo Young-hoon, Hyun Mi, Tei, Song Eun-i, Buzz (Yoon Woo-hyun, Son Sung-hee, Kim Ye-joon, Shin Joon-gi), Sunwoo Sun, Lee Guk-joo, Oh Jeong-yeon, DIA (Seunghee, Yebin, Chaeyeon)	R1: "Coward" (겁쟁이); R2: "Thorn" (가시); R3: "Travel to Me" (나에게로 떠나는 여행); R4: "You Don't Know Men" (남자를 몰라)	Park Hyun-soo	Kwon Joon-yeon	Min Kyung-hoon (Note: When the original singer is eliminated in round 3, they stay in round 4, (with null votes) and the impersonator with the most number of votes becomes the final winner.)	Baek Sung-jin	Choi Seung-ho	Park Kyung-won (Note: Min Kyung-hoon won the most number of votes but because he was eliminated before, Park Kyung-won became the final winner.)
4	October 24, 2015	Late Shin Hae-chul	Joo Young-hoon, Shin Daechul (Sinawe), Yoo Sun, N.EX.T (Kim Se-hwang, Lee Hyun-seop, Ji Hyun-soo), Song Eun-i, Kim Jong-seo, Namgoong Yeon, NC.A, Park Seuk-gi, Eric Nam, Lady Jane, 2Eyes, Yoon Won-hee	R1: "Jazz Cafe" (재즈카페); R2: "Fly, Chick" (날아라 병아리); R3: "To Her" (그대에게); R4: "As Life Draws to an End Before Us" (우리 앞의 생이 끝나갈 때)	Ahn Min-ho	Na Hyun-ho	Kim Dong-hwan	Kwon Seung-goo	Jung Jae-hoon	Shin Hae-chul
5	October 31, 2015	Lee Eun-mi	Joo Young-hoon, Lee Yoon-mi, Lee Kye-in, Lee Hye-jeong, Song Eun-i, Park Hak-gi, Solbi, Kim Kyung-in, Hwang Je-sung, N.Flying (Lee Seung-hyub, Kim Jae-hyun), Outsider, Laboum (Yujeong, Soyeon, ZN), Yoon Il-sang	R1: "A Certain Longing" (어떤 그리움); R2: "Into Memory" (기억 속으로); R3: "I Have a Lover" (애인있어요); R4: "Nocturne" (녹턴)	(Israel) Ariel Weinberg	Kim Hee-na	Kwon Joo-hee	Ji Se-hee	Park Yeon-kyung	Lee Eun-mi
6	November 7, 2015	So Chan-whee	Joo Young-hoon, Kim Kyung-ho, Byun Jung-soo, Song Eun-i, Lee Ki-chan, Park Na-rae, Kim Byung-soo, Song Ji-eun (Secret), Kim Jin, Jang Dong-jik, Hello Venus (Nara, Yooyoung, Yeoreum), VIXX (Ken, Ravi, Hyuk)	R1: "Chance to Farewell" (헤어지는 기회); R2: "A Smart Choice" (현명한 선택); R3: "Tears"; R4: "No Choice But to Let You Go" (보낼 수 밖에 없는 난)	Yoo Da-young	Lee Joo-hyung (Male)	Sook Haeng	—N/a	Hwang In-sook, Joo Mi-sung	So Chan-whee
7	November 14, 2015	Kim Jung-min	Kim Jong-jin (Bom Yeoreum Gaeul Kyeoul), Oh Hyun-kyung, Jang Dong-jik, Rumiko Tani, Lee Byung-jin, Noel (Lee Sang-gon, Kang Kyun-sung), Kim Sook, Song Eun-i, BESTie, HALO (Jaeyong, Heecheon), Kis	R1: "Last Promise" (마지막 약속); R2: "Sad Promise" (슬픈 언약식); R3: "Lover" (애인); R4: "Endless Love" (무한지애)	Yoon Gwang-yong	Kim Hwan-jin	Lee Bong-geun	Shin Hee-young	Kim Jong-moon	Kim Jung-min
8	November 21, 2015	Kim Yeon-woo	Joo Young-hoon, Kim Kyung-ho, Park Joon-geum, Song Eun-i, Muzie, Jung Sung-ho, Oh Young-sook, Mamamoo, Jang Sung-kyu, Song Min-gyo, Oh Jeong-yeon, Choi Hee, VIXX (Ken, Ravi), Jang Dong-hyuk	R1: "Farewell Taxi" (이별택시); R2: "Is It Still Beautiful" (여전히 아름다운지); R3: "If You're Like Me" (나와 같다면); R4: "Love, That Common Word" (사랑한다는 흔한 말)	Ahn Jeong-hoon	Han Seung-hee	Lee Yong-goo	Jo Gil-won	Jang Woo-ram	Kim Yeon-woo
9	November 28, 2015	Yim Jae-beom	Shin Jae-hong, Sunwoo Yong-nyeo, Joo Young-hoon, Kim Jeong-min, Park Wan-kyu, Kim Tae-woo (g.o.d), Eun Ga-eun, Lee Hong-gi (F.T. Island), Oh Jeong-yeon, Lee Ji-ae, Seo Hyun-jin, Jang Do-yeon, Muzie; Special: Sohyang	R1: "Scar Deeper Than Love" (사랑보다 깊은 상처); R2: "Confession" (고해); R3: "The Flight" (비상); R4: "For You" (너를 위해)	Lee Young-jae	Shin Gong-hoon, Jung Young-pil	Ahn Jeong-soo	Kim Min-ho	Kim Jin-wook	Yim Jae-beom
10	December 5, 2015	Shin Ji (Koyote)	Sunwoo Yong-nyeo, Joo Young-hoon, Koyote (Kim Jong-min, Bbaek Ga), Song Eun-i, Cool (Kim Sung-soo, Lee Jae-hoon), Jang Dong-hyuk, EXID (Solji, LE, Hani), Topp Dogg (B-Joo, Xero), Im Jae-yong	R1: "Genuine" (순정); R2: "Sad Dream" (비몽); R3: "Passion"; R4: "Paran" (파란)	Poong Geum	Solbi	NC.A	Oh Eun-jin	Kim Soo-jin	Shin Ji
11	December 12, 2015	Gummy	Joo Young-hoon, Ahn Moon-sook, Wheesung, Kim Do-hoon, Song Eun-i, Kim Hyo-jin, Kim Il-joong, Kim Hyun-wook, Sung Eun, Fiestar (Jei, Cao Lu), Joy o'clock Special: Kim Jin-ho	R1: "If You Come Back" (그대 돌아오면); R2: "We Should've Been Friends" (친구라도 될 걸 그랬어); R3: "Childish Adult" (어른아이); R4: "Memory Loss" (기억상실)	Lee Se-mi	Monika	Kim Hyun-sil	Hong Hye-jin	Lee Eun-ah	Gummy
12	December 19, 2015	Byun Jin-sub	Joo Young-hoon, Kim Wan-sun, Kim Kwang-kyu, Bang Eun-hee, Kim Sung-ryung, Go Woo-ri (Rainbow), Song Eun-i, Kim Hyo-jin, Kim In-seok, Kangnam (M.I.B), U Sung-eun, Park Si-hwan, Queen B'Z (Goo Seul-yi, Nora-Born, Lee Roo-mi)	R1: "Dear My Lady" (숙녀에게); R2: "Being Alone" (홀로 된다는 것); R3: "Like a Bird" (새들처럼); R4: "To You Again" (너에게로 또 다시)	Kim Dong-ho	Kim Dong-eon	Park Hwal-gi	Song Sung-yong	Lee Seung-cheol	Byun Jin-sub
13	December 26, 2015	Highlights and King of Kings' Challenge's preparation								

=== King of Kings' Challenge ===
King of Hidden Singer in season 4

Semifinals

Episode #	Air date	Panel		Participants		
14–15	January 2, 2016 – January 9, 2016	Joo Young-hoon, Solbi, NC.A, Shin Ji, So Chan-whee, Kim Heung-gook, Kim Jung-min, Min Kyung-hoon, Song Eun-i, Apink (Yoon Bo-mi, Oh Ha-young, Kim Kyung-in, Ahn Na-kyung, Song Min-gyo, Jo Soo-ae		The regular episodes' last survivors (excluded the singers)		
14–15	Stage #	Participant	Singer	Song	Votes (out of 300)	Rank
14–15	Group A					
14–15	1	Joo Mi-sung	So Chan-whee	"A Smart Choice" (현명한 선택)	185	5
14–15	2	Seo Young-seo	BoA	"Valenti"	220	4
14–15	3	Kim Jin-wook	Yim Jae-beom	"For You" (너를 위해)	223	3
14–15	4	Kim Jeong-joon	Kim Jin-ho	"As We Live" (살다가)	274	1
14–15	5	Kim Jong-moon	Kim Jung-min	"Endless Love" (무한지애)	256	2
14–15	Group B					
14–15	1	Hwang In-sook	So Chan-whee	"Tears"	265	1
14–15	2	Park Kyung-won	Min Kyung-hoon	"You Don't Know Men" (남자를 몰라)	257	2 (audiences' wildcard)
14–15	3	Lee Seung-cheol	Byun Jin-sub	"Dear My Lady" (숙녀에게)	197	4
14–15	4	Kim Soo-jin	Shin Ji	"Sad Dream" (비몽)	256	3
14–15	Group C					
14–15	1	Jung Jae-hoon	Late Shin Hae-chul	"To Her" (그대에게)	258	2
14–15	2	Lee Eun-ah	Gummy	"We Should've Been Friends" (친구라도 될 걸 그랬어)	259	1
14–15	3	Park Yeon-kyung	Lee Eun-mi	"Nocturne" (녹턴)	254	3
14–15	4	Jang Woo-ram	Kim Yeon-woo	"Love, That Common Word" (사랑한다는 흔한 말)	184	4
14–15	Choral of 13 participants: "Sano Ramen" (사노라면; Johnny Lee)					
14–15	Special performance: Jeon In-kwon – "Imagine"					
14–15	Choral of Jeon In-kwon and 13 participants: "Don't Worry" (걱정말아요 그대)					

Final (live broadcast)

Episode #	Air date	Panel		Participants		
16	January 16, 2016	Joo Young-hoon, Kim Heung-gook, Gummy, So Chan-whee, Min Kyung-hoon, Kim Jung-min, Song Eun-i, AOA (Jimin, Mina)		The groups' first place and the audiences' wildcard in the semifinals		
16	Stage #	Participant	Singer	Song	Votes (out of 506,967)	Rank
16	1	Hwang In-sook	So Chan-whee	"A Smart Choice" (현명한 선택)	101,489 (20.0%)	Third place
16	2	Kim Jeong-joon	Kim Jin-ho	"Timeless"	151,451 (29.9%)	Runner-up
16	3	Lee Eun-ah	Gummy	"Memory Loss" (기억상실)	154,139 (30.4%)	Winner
16	4	Park Kyung-won	Min Kyung-hoon	"Coward" (겁쟁이)	99,888 (19.7%)	Fourth place
16	Special performance: Turbo – "Again" (다시) + "Love Is" + "White Love" (스키장에서) + "Twist King"					

== Season 5 ==
=== Special episodes ===
List of special episodes in season 5

Hidden Singer 5 Comeback Special (aired on June 10, 2018)

- MC: Jun Hyun-moo, Song Eun-i (special)
- Panel: Kim Kyung-ho, Hwanhee (Fly to the Sky), Gummy, Park Sung-kwang
- Highlights of the previous seasons:
  - Doppelganger had the same voice and appearance with the singer: Lee Moon-se's part (S1 Ep.2), Lee Jae-hoon's part (S3 Ep.2)
  - Beautiful miracle made by the participant (the singer was eliminated before the last participant): Jo Sung-mo's part (S2 Ep.3), Lee Seung-hwan's part (S3 Ep.10), Min Kyung-hoon's part (S4 Ep.3)
  - Top 10 legends that you "want to see again":
    - 1st – Late Kim Kwang-seok's part (S2 Ep.12)
    - 2nd – Min Kyung-hoon's part (S4 Ep.3)
    - 3rd – Hwanhee's part (S3 Ep.4)
    - 4th – Im Chang-jung's part (S2 Ep.1)
    - 5th – Wheesung's part (S2 Ep.9)
    - 6th – Lee Sun-hee's part (S3 Ep.1)
    - 7th – Gummy's part (S4 Ep.11)
    - 8th – Lee Seung-hwan's part (S3 Ep.10)
    - 9th – Lee Jae-hoon's part (S3 Ep.2)
    - 10th – Yim Jae-beom's part (S4 Ep.9)
    - 11th – Kim Kyung-ho's part (S1 Pilot 2)
- Season 5's line-up prediction: Jeon In-kwon, Psy, Kangta (H.O.T.), Bada (S.E.S.), K.Will, Hong Jin-young, Ailee

=== Regular episodes ===
List of regular episodes in season 5

Episode #	Air Date/ References	Singer	Panel of Celebrities	Song	Round 1	Round 2	Round 3	Round 4		
Episode #	Air Date/ References	Singer	Panel of Celebrities	Song	Round 1	Round 2	Round 3	Third place	Runner-up	Winner
1	June 17, 2018	Kangta (H.O.T.)	Sunwoo Yong-nyeo, Song Eun-i, Jeong Jun-ha, Tony An (H.O.T.), Sechs Kies (Eun Ji-won, Kang Sung-hoon), Luna (f(x)), Hyoyeon (Girls' Generation), Park Ji-sun, Park Sung-kwang, Momoland (Hyebin, Jane, JooE); Special: Lee Jae-won (H.O.T.)	R1: "Candy" (캔디); R2: "Polaris" (북극성); R3: "Hope" (빛); R4: "Memories" (사랑은 기억보다)	Choi Young-gyun	Kim Hwi-goo	Kangta	Kim Hyung-chan	Cha Gyeo-wool	Kim Min-chang (Note: Kangta won the most number of votes but because he was eliminated before, Kim Min-chang became the final winner.)
2	June 24, 2018	Jeon In-kwon	Moon Hee-kyung, Song Eun-i, Kim Do-gyoon, Kim Jong-seo, Park Wan-kyu, Kim Ji-sook, Boom, Sam Okyere, Alberto Mondi, Lovelyz (Jiae, Jisoo, Kei, Yein), IZ (Woosu, Junyoung)	R1: "That's Only My World" (그것만이 내 세상); R2: "Please" (제발); R3: "Round Round and Round" (돌고 돌고 돌고); R4: "After the Love Has Gone" (사랑한 후에)	Kim Kwang-young	Kim Bong-gi	Hong In-pyo	Yoo Je-hyuk	Han Ga-ram	Jeon In-kwon
3	July 1, 2018	Psy	Kim Hyung-seok, Song Eun-i, Noh Sa-yeon, Tony An (H.O.T.), UV, Kim Il-joong, Yoo Min-sang, Park Sung-kwang, AOA (Yuna, Hyejeong, Chanmi), Killagramz	R1: "Champion" (챔피언); R2: "Gangnam Style" (강남스타일); R3: "It's Art" (예술이야); R4: "Father" (아버지)	Shin Yong-nam	Im Dong-yeol	Seo Yoo-hyun	Choi Go-ya	Kim Sung-in	Psy
4	July 8, 2018	K.Will	Hyun Mi, Song Eun-i, Kim Do-hoon, Soyou, DinDin, Lee Ji-hye, Choi Hyun-woo, Forestella, Cosmic Girls (Eunseo, Dayoung), Vromance (Janghyun, Hyunkyu)	R1: "Dropping the Tears" (눈물이 뚝뚝); R2: "I Need You" (니가 필요해); R3: "Please Don't ..." (이러지마 제발); R4: "Miss, Miss, Miss" (그립고 그립고 그립다)	Shin Seo-woo	Shin Young-hwan	Song Ji-seok	Kim Byung-gil	Jung Han	K.Will
5	July 15, 2018	Lyn	Lee Kye-in, Song Eun-i, Wheesung, Choi Jung-in, Kim Hyo-jin, Son Dong-woon (Highlight), Yoo Jae-hwan, Oh My Girl (Hyojung, YooA, Seunghee), Kim Min-ki, Hong Yoon-hwa, Ken (VIXX), Cheon Dan-bi	R1: "Love.. Is All Lies" (사랑.. 다 거짓말); R2: "Back in Time" (시간을 거슬러); R3: "... We Used to Love..." (...사랑했잖아...); R4: "My Destiny"	Hyun Jin-joo	Heo Mi-yeon	Hyun So-jin	—N/a	Ahn Min-hee, Choi Woo-sung (Note: Choi Woo-sung was one of So Chan-whee's Best 5 contestants in SBS's Fantastic Duo Season 2 (Episode 29).) (Male)	Lyn
6	July 22, 2018	Ko Yu-jin (Flower)	Bang Eun-hee, Song Eun-i, Min Kyung-hoon (Buzz), Kim Kyung-ho, Kim Jung-min, Flower (Kim Woo-di, Go Sung-jin), Weki Meki (Suyeon, Doyeon, Sei), Kwak Dong-hyun, Jang Dong-min, Park Sung-kwang	R1: "Endless"; R2: "Slow Walking Kid" (걸음이 느린 아이); R3: "Expression of Love" (애정표현); R4: "Tears" (눈물)	Nam Hyung-wook	Seon Yong-seon	Jung Ji-hoon	Lee Dong-young	Kang Hyung-ho	Ko Yu-jin
7	July 29, 2018	Hong Jin-young	Moon Hee-kyung, Song Eun-i, Jo Young-soo, Shin Ji (Koyote), Hong Jin-ho, Byun Gi-soo, Jin Hae-sung, IZ (Woosu, Hyunjun), Twice (Jeongyeon, Sana, Mina), Kim Hwan, Jang Sung-kyu	R1: "Good Bye" (잘가라); R2: "Thumb Up" (엄지 척); R3: "Cheer Up" (산다는 건); R4: "Love Battery" (사랑의 배터리)	Go Soo-yeon	Eun Ha-soo	Ma Jeong-mi	Lee Seung-yeon	Yoo Ji-na	Hong Jin-young
8	August 5, 2018	Ailee	Song Eun-i, Park So-hyun, Wheesung, Hwang Chi-yeul, Shorry J (Mighty Mouth), Park Sung-kwang, Yoo Min-sang, NU'EST W (Aron, Baekho, Ren), Park Seul-gi, Guillaume Patry, Christian Burgos	R1: "Heaven"; R2: "I Will Show You" (보여줄게); R3: "I Will Go to You like the First Snow" (첫눈처럼 너에게 가겠다); R4: "U&I"	Park Hye-won	Lee Yoo-jin	Ailee	Lee Jeong-eun	Kwon Ye-rin	Kang Go-eun (Note: Ailee won the most number of votes but because she was eliminated before, Kang Go-eun became the final winner.)
9	August 12, 2018	Bada (S.E.S.)	Jung Jae-yong (DJ DOC), Song Eun-i, Shoo (S.E.S.), (Note: Despite appearing as a panelist on the episode, Shoo's individual interviews were all cut before broadcast due to her gambling debt scandal.) Lee Jae-won (H.O.T.), Song Min-gyo, Jo Soo-ae, Hanhae, Goon Jo, SEVENTEEN (Jeonghan, DK, Seungkwan), Byun Gi-soo, Edel Reinklang	R1: "Dreams Come True" (Original: S.E.S.); R2: "I Love You" (너를 사랑해) (Original: S.E.S.); R3: "MAD"; R4: "Just in Love" (꿈을 모아서) (Original: S.E.S.)	Jung Ji-yoon	Shin Jin-kyung	Na Mi-hee	Bada	Kim Hye-in	Choi So-hyun
10	August 19, 2018	Yang Hee-eun	Lee Sung-mi, Lee Juck, Song Eun-i, Kim Young-chul, Lee Se-joon (Yurisangja), Yook Joong-wan (Rose Motel), Park Sung-kwang, Duetto, Kwak Dong-hyun, Park Sang-don, NC.A (Uni.T), Gugudan (Nayoung, Sejeong); Special: Lee Young-ja, Kim Sook (Note: Special appearances by JTBC's LAN Life's hosts after the fourth round.)	R1: "Morning Dew" (아침 이슬); R2: "Love on Its Solitude" (사랑 그 쓸쓸함에 대하여); R3: "White Magnolia" (하얀 목련); R4: "Farewell Sadness" (슬픔 이젠 안녕)	Im Da-bi	Jung Yoo-hyun	Joo Gi-hoon (Male)	Seo Yi-yeon	Kim You-jung	Yang Hee-eun
11	August 26, 2018	Zion.T	Lee Moo-song, Defconn, Song Eun-i, Shim Jin-hwa, Kim Won-hyo, Brown Eyed Girls (Miryo, Narsha), Peejay, iKON (Yunhyeong, B.I, Donghyuk), Ko Eun-sung, Kwon Seo-kyung	R1: "Eat" (꺼내 먹어요); R2: "The Song" (노래); R3: "See Through" (씨스루) (Original: Primary ft. Gaeko & Zion.T); R4: "Yanghwa Bridge" (양화대교)	Pyun Seung-hoon	Jaden	Park Jae-seok	Kim Jae-ho	Park Joon-young	Zion.T
12	September 2, 2018	Park Mi-kyung	Clon, Hong Rok-gi, Kim Chang-hwan, Chae Yeon, Song Eun-i, Lee Se-joon (Yurisangja), Red Velvet (Seulgi, Joy), The East Light (Sagang, Woojin), Gong Seo-young, Hwang Bo-mi	R1: "Unreasonable Reason" (이유같지 않은 이유); R2: "Obsession" (집착); R3: "Distant Memories of You" (기억속의 먼 그대에게); R4: "Warning of the Eve" (이브의 경고)	Park Da-bin	Kim Min-seon (Note: Kim Min-seon was the winner in episode 11 of Mnet's I Can See Your Voice's first season and had the final duo stage with singer Ailee.)	Oh Bo-ram	Hwang Ye-seul	Lee Hyo-jin	Park Mi-kyung
13	September 9, 2018	Highlights and King of Kings' Challenge's preparation								

=== King of Kings' Challenge ===
King of Hidden Singer in season 5

Episode #	Air date/ References	Panel		Participants		
14–15	September 16, 2018 – September 23, 2018	Jang Woo-ram, Christian Burgos, Park Sung-kwang, Hong Jin-young, Yang Hee-eun, Im Chang-jung, Song Eun-i, Woohyun (Infinite), Chungha, Kim So-hee; Special: Bada (S.E.S.)		The regular episodes' last survivors (excluded the singers)		
14–15	Stage #	Participant	Singer	Song	Votes (out of 300)	Rank
14–15	1	Ahn Min-hee	Lyn	"Back in Time" (시간을 거슬러) (Moon Embracing the Sun OST)	265	3
14–15	2	Kang Hyung-ho	Ko Yu-jin (Flower)	"Tears" (눈물)	203	12
14–15	3	Han Ga-ram	Jeon In-kwon	"After the Love Has Gone" (사랑한 후에)	232	9
14–15	4	Choi Woo-sung	Lyn	"My Destiny"	241	5
14–15	5	Kim Sung-in	Psy	"Gangnam Style" (강남스타일)	234	8
14–15	6	Lee Hyo-jin	Park Mi-kyung	"Unreasonable Reason" (이유같지 않은 이유)	256	4
14–15	7	Jung Han	K.Will	"Please Don't ..." (이러지마 제발)	222	11
14–15	8	Park Joon-young	Zion.T	"Yanghwa Bridge" (양화대교)	178	13
14–15	9	Choi So-hyun	Bada (S.E.S.)	"MAD"	280	1
14–15	10	Yoo Ji-na	Hong Jin-young	"Thumb Up" (엄지 척)	238	7
14–15	11	Kim Min-chang	Kangta (H.O.T.)	"Polaris" (북극성)	277	2
14–15	12	Kang Go-eun	Ailee	"I Will Show You" (보여줄게)	239	6
14–15	13	Kim You-jung	Yang Hee-eun	"Evergreen Tree" (상록수)	227	10
14–15	Special performance: Im Chang-jung – "There Has Never Been a Day I Haven't Loved You" (하루도 그대를 사랑하지 않은 적이 없었다)					
14–15	Choral of 13 participants: "Someday" (언젠가는; Lee Tzsche)					

=== All Five Seasons' Doppel-singer Music Festival ===
All Five Seasons' Doppel-singer Music Festival

Episode #	Air date/ References	Panel	Participants		
16–17	September 30, 2018 – October 7, 2018	Jang Woo-ram, Hangzoo, DinDin, Park Sung-kwang, Kim Won-jun, Johan Kim, Song Eun-i, Myteen (Shin Junseop, Song Yuvin)	Season 1: Kim Kyung-ho & Kwak Dong-hyun; Season 3: Park Hyun-bin & Kim Jae-hyun; Season 4: So Chan-whee & Hwang In-sook, Gummy & Lee Eun-ah; Season 5: Park Mi-kyung & Lee Hyo-jin, Bada (S.E.S.) & Choi So-hyun, Lyn & Choi Woo-sung & Ahn Min-hee, K.Will & Jung Han		
16–17	Stage #	Performers	First performance	Second performance	Result (votes out of 300)
16–17	1	So Chan-whee & Hwang In-sook	"A Smart Choice" (현명한 선택)	"Tears"	
16–17	2	K.Will & Jung Han	"Growing" (꽃이 핀다)	"I'll Be with You" (네 곁에)	Third place (48)
16–17	3	Park Hyun-bin & Kim Jae-hyun	"Dead Drunk" (곤드레 만드레)	"Just Trust Me" (오빠만 믿어)	
16–17	4	Lyn & Choi Woo-sung & Ahn Min-hee	"True Story" (실화)	"Honey, Baby Love" (자기야 여보야 사랑아)	
16–17	5	Bada & Choi So-hyun	"V.I.P"	"Sad Song" (비가) (Original: S.E.S.)	
16–17	6	Kim Kyung-ho & Kwak Dong-hyun	"Forbidden Love" (금지된 사랑)	"Shout"	Second place (75)
16–17	7	Gummy & Lee Eun-ah	"Childish Adult" (어른아이)	"You Are My Everything"	Best couple (98)
16–17	8	Park Mi-kyung & Lee Hyo-jin	"Distant Memories of You" (기억속의 먼 그대에게)	"Punishment" (벌) (feat. other four participants in Park Mi-kyung's episode)	

== Season 6 ==
=== Special episodes ===
List of special episodes in season 6

Hidden Singer 6 Comeback Special - Prologue (aired on July 31, 2020)

- MC: Jun Hyun-moo, Song Eun-i (special)
- Panel: Jang Minho, K.Will, Seunghee (Oh My Girl)
- Congratulatory Squad Appearances (also joins as panel):
  - Young Tak (previously appeared on the Wheesung episode as a contestant (S2 Ep.9))
  - Kim Soo-chan (previously appeared on the Nam Jin episode as a contestant (S2 Ep.8))
  - Jang Woo-ram (previously appeared on the Kim Yeon-woo episode as a contestant (S4 Ep.8))
  - Kim Yeon-ja
- Highlights of the previous seasons:
  - Best 3 Sync Probabilities of Season 5: Kangta's part (Ep.1 round 3), Lyn's part (Ep.5 round 2), Bada's part (Ep.9 round 4), K.Will's part (Ep.4 round 2)
  - Trot Singers' Quiz (guessing which one of the six trot singers is not an impersonator)
  - Season 6 line-up hearing quiz
- Season 6's line-up prediction: Rain, Hwasa (Mamamoo), Jang Beom-june, Kim Won-jun, Jin Sung, Kim Jong-kook, Jang Yoon-jeong, Baek Ji-young, Lee So-ra, Kim Yeon-ja

Hidden Singer 6 Special Live Broadcast Quiz (aired on September 18, 2020; labelled as episode 7)

- MC: Jun Hyun-moo
- Panel: Song Eun-i, Shindong (Super Junior), Seunghee (Oh My Girl), Baek Ji-young
- Season 6's second half line-up: Kim Jong-kook, Seol Woon-do, Jang Yoon-jeong, Kim Wan-sun, Jang Beom-june, Lee So-ra

=== Regular episodes ===
List of regular episodes in season 6

Episode #	Air Date/ References	Singer	Panel of Celebrities	Song	Round 1	Round 2	Round 3	Round 4		
Episode #	Air Date/ References	Singer	Panel of Celebrities	Song	Round 1	Round 2	Round 3	Third place	Runner-up	Winner
1	August 7, 2020	Kim Yeon-ja	Sunwoo Yong-nyeo, Lee Man-ki, Song Eun-i, Yoon Il-sang, Shin Bong-sun, Moon Se-yoon, Lim Young-woong, DinDin, Lee Chan-won, Oh My Girl (Hyojung, Mimi, Binnie), The Boyz (Hyunjae, Juyeon, New, Q, Ju Haknyeon)	R1: "Mercury Lamp" (수은등); R2: "In 10 Minutes" (10분 내로); R3: "Amor Fati" (아모르 파티); R4: "Are You Serious?" (진정인가요)	Jennifer Jang	Shin Soo-mi	Yeom Jeong-mi	Kang Yoo-jin	Ahn Yi-sook	Kim Yeon-ja
2	August 14, 2020	Kim Won-jun	Kim Hyung-seok, Park Mi-kyung, Kim Sung-ryung, Bang Eun-hee, Song Eun-i, Kim Se-jin, Shin Bong-sun, Shin Ji (Koyote), Moon Se-yoon, Nam Chang-hee, DinDin, Itzy, La Poem, (Note: Winner of Phantom Singer Season 3.) Oyul	R1: "While You Were Not Here" (너 없는 동안); R2: "In the Dead of the Night" (모두 잠든 후에); R3: "Always" (언제나); R4: "Show"	Sung Chang-yong	Im Gyu-hyung	Lee Roo-ri	Yoon Sung-min	Kim Won-jun	Park Sung-il
3	August 21, 2020	Jin Sung	Choi Yang-rak, Paeng Hyun-sook, Song Eun-i, Go Jae-geun, Abhishek Gupta (Lucky), Shin Bong-sun, Moon Se-yoon, Alberto Mondi, DinDin, Aftermoon (Kevin Oh, Lee Jong-hoon, Choi Young-jin), Kim Soo-chan, Kim Hee-jae, GFriend (Sowon, Yerin, Eunha, Yuju), Angelina Danilova, Jung Dong-won	R1: "Don't Go" (가지마); R2: "One's Impoverished Days" (보릿고개); R3: "Don't Tackle Me" (태클을 걸지마); R4: "At Andong Station" (안동역에서)	Ji Byung-joon	Park Gil-sam	Lee Seo-yool	Lee Tak	Jin Sung	Kim Wan-joon
4	August 28, 2020	Baek Ji-young (Rematch)	Song Eun-i, Park Joon-hyung, Jang Minho, Kim Ji-hye, Lee Ji-hye, Shin Bong-sun, Moon Se-yoon, Young Tak, DinDin, Iz*One (Kwon Eun-bi, Kim Chaewon, Kim Min-ju, Jo Yu-ri, Jang Won-young), RabidAnce (Note: Runner-up of Phantom Singer Season 3.)	R1: "That Woman" (그 여자); R2: "Like Being Hit by a Bullet" (총 맞은 것처럼); R3: "My Ear's Candy" (내 귀에 캔디) (Note: Special performance appearance by Kim Dong-han.); R4: "No Love, No Heartbreak" (다시는 사랑하지 않고, 이별에 아파하기 싫어)	Lee Yoon-woo	Lee Gyu-ra	Im Ji-an	Noh Yoon-seo	Baek Ji-young	Jung Yoo-mi
5	September 4, 2020	Rain	Joon Park (g.o.d), Song Eun-i, Kim Hye-eun, Han Suk-joon, Shin Bong-sun, Moon Se-yoon, Ki Eun-se, Lee Yeon-doo, Sandara Park, Park Seul-gi, DinDin, Hani (EXID), Got7 (Youngjae, BamBam), Monsta X (Kihyun, Hyungwon), Lim Na-young, Forestella	R1: "Bad Guy" (나쁜 남자); R2: "Love Song" (널 붙잡을 노래); R3: "Ways to Avoid the Sun" (태양을 피하는 방법); R4: "Love Story"	Shin Jae-wook	Shownu, Cha Joon-taek	Lee Jun-yong	Park Min-seok	Rain	Kim Hyun-woo
6	September 11, 2020	Hwasa (Mamamoo)	Kim Kyung-ho, Song Eun-i, Kim Jong-min (Koyote), Shin Bong-sun, Moon Se-yoon, Park Woo-sang, Kwak Dong-hyun, DinDin, Lovelyz (Baby Soul, Kei, Yein), Seunghee (Oh My Girl), Onewe (Yonghoon, Dongmyeong), Kim Jae-hwan, Lucy, Natty	R1: "Don't Give It to Me" (주지마); R2: "Twit" (멍청이); R3: "Décalcomanie" (데칼코마니); R4: "María" (마리아)	Yeo Soo-jin	Seok Ji-soo (Note: SBS's K-pop Star 6 Top 6.)	Kim Roo-ah	Yoo Joo-yi (Note: Former Rania member, also known by the stage name Cosmic Girl.)	Lee Soo-bin	Hwasa
8	September 25, 2020 (Note: For this episode, the show was recorded in the untact way. The recording of the show would be on live stream through Naver TV, on Monday from 19:00 (KST). For every round, viewers can vote through the live stream, and to avoid spoilers before the broadcast on television, after the voting time, the live stream would be turned off, and would be live again for the next round, if applicable.)	Kim Jong-kook (Turbo) (Rematch)	Joo Young-hoon, Song Eun-i, Kim Jung-nam (Turbo), Cha Tae-hyun, Chae Yeon, Shin Bong-sun, Moon Se-yoon, Yang Se-chan, Go Woo-ri, DinDin, (G)I-dle (Miyeon, Minnie, Soyeon, Yuqi), Letteamor (Note: 2nd runner-up of Phantom Singer Season 3.)	R1: "My Childhood Dream" (나 어릴적 꿈); R2: "Twist King"; R3: "Black Cat Nero" (검은 고양이 네로); R4: "Jazz Bar" (어느 째즈바)	Park Woo-jae	Gong Min-soo	Jang Tae-won	Kim Min-kyu	Jo Joon-ho	Kim Jong-kook
9	October 2, 2020	Seol Woon-do	Kim Young-ok, Woo Yeon-yi, Jo Hye-ryun, Song Eun-i, Go Jae-geun, Lee Hee-jin, Jo Eun-sae, Shin Bong-sun, Noel (Jeon Woo-sung, Kang Kyun-sung), Moon Se-yoon, Ryu Ji-kwang, Shin In-seon, DinDin, Kim Soo-chan, April (Chaekyung, Naeun, Rachel), Hong Jam-eon	R1: "Everybody Cha Cha Cha" (다함께 차차차); R2: "Twist of Love" (사랑의 트위스트); R3: "Woman of Samba" (쌈바의 여인); R4: "Purple-Colored Postcard" (보라빛 엽서)	Son Bin-ah	Park Sang-woon	Lee Hyun-seung	Park Jin-hyun	Han Sang-gwi	Seol Woon-do
10	October 9, 2020	Jang Yoon-jeong (Rematch)	Lee Kye-in, Park Jung-soo, Song Eun-i, Jo Young-soo, Jang Minho, Kim Hwan, Shin Bong-sun, Moon Se-yoon, Oh Jeong-yeon, Young Tak, DinDin, Kim Hee-jae, Kassy, Lee Chan-won, Oh My Girl (Mimi, YooA, Jiho, Binnie), Super Five	R1: "Jjan Jja Ra" (짠짜라); R2: "Flower" (꽃); R3: "Girl Next Door" (옆집 누나); R4: "Local Train for Mokpo" (목포행 완행열차)	Shin Eun-seo	Kim Gyu-ri	Kim Soo-hyun	Jang Seung-mi	Kim Da-na	Jang Yoon-jeong
11	October 16, 2020	Kim Wan-sun	Hur Jae, Son Mu-hyeon, Song Eun-i, Kim Jung-nam (Turbo), Kang Sung-yeon, Bruno Bruni Jr., Sook Haeng, Shin Bong-sun, Shin Ji (Koyote), Moon Se-yoon, Park Shin-young, DinDin, Fromis 9 (Lee Sae-rom, Song Ha-young, Jang Gyu-ri, Lee Na-gyung), Purple Rain	R1: "Tonight" (오늘밤); R2: "The Pierrot Laughs at Us" (삐에로는 우릴 보고 웃지); R3: "Let's Forget About It" (이젠 잊기로 해요); R4: "Dance in the Rhythm" (리듬 속의 그 춤을)	Kim Chae-won	(United States) Maria Elizabeth Leise (Note: Formerly a part of Mnet's UHSN, was a contestant and winner on I Can See Your Voice season 6 episode 3.)	Lee Da-hyun	Sung Yoo-bin	Kim Eun-young	Kim Wan-sun
12	October 23, 2020	Jang Beom-june	Kim Soo-ro, Park Myung-soo, Kang Sung-jin, Song Eun-i, Kim Tae-jin, Shin Bong-sun, Moon Se-yoon, Hong Isaac, Kim Ji-sook, Jo Hyun-young, DinDin, Zai.Ro, Weki Meki (Ji Su-yeon, Elly, Choi Yoo-jung, Kim Do-yeon), Bandage	R1: "Cherry Blossom Ending" (벚꽃 엔딩); R2: "Your Shampoo Scent in the Flowers" (흔들리는 꽃들 속에서 네 샴푸향이 느껴진거야); R3: "Karaoke" (노래방에서); R4: "Yeosu Night Sea" (여수 밤바다)	Lee Jae-ho	Jang Beom-june	Song Ji-hoon, Yoo Min-sang	—N/a	Kim Ga-ram	Pyeon Hae-joon
13	October 30, 2020	Lee So-ra	Lee Hye-jung, Jung Ji-chan, Song Eun-i, Lee Soo-young, Shin Bong-sun, Lyn, Moon Se-yoon, Park Ki-woong, Henry Lau, DinDin, Hoppipolla, Jung Seung-hwan, Lee Su-hyun (AKMU), Lunarsolar	R1: "Song Request" (신청곡); R2: "Please" (제발); R3: "Proposal" (청혼); R4: "The Wind is Blowing" (바람이 분다)	Park Jin-ah	Lee Ah-ri	Jo Hye-jin	Kwon Soon-il (Male)	Kim Eun-joo	Lee So-ra

=== King of Kings' Challenge ===
King of Hidden Singer in season 6

Episode #	Air date/ References	Panel			Participants			
14–15	November 6, 2020 – November 13, 2020	Kim Wan-sun, Song Eun-i, Kim Won-jun, Baek Ji-young, Shin Bong-sun, Moon Se-yoon, Song Min-kyo, Kang Ji-young, DinDin, Ham Yeon-ji, Yezi, NU'EST (JR, Aron), April (Chaewon, Jinsol), Duetto, Elris (Bella, Hyeseong, Sohee), Stray Kids (Lee Know, Hyunjin), Cignature (Jeewon, Belle, Semi), Treasure (Junkyu, Yedam, Jeongwoo); Special: Bada and Choi So-hyun (Note: Final winner of Season 5.)			The regular episodes' last survivors (excluded the singers)			
14–15	Stage #	Participant	Singer	Song	Votes			Rank
14–15	Stage #	Participant	Singer	Song	Panel (out of 300)	Viewers (out of 1700)	Total	Rank
14–15	1	Park Sung-il	Kim Won-jun	"Show"	277	1323	1600	11
14–15	2	Kim Eun-joo	Lee So-ra	"Please" (제발)	276	1415	1691	8
14–15	3	Pyeon Hae-joon	Jang Beom-june	"Yeosu Night Sea" (여수 밤바다)	295	1601	1896	2
14–15	4	Han Sang-gwi	Seol Woon-do	"Purple-Colored Postcard" (보라빛 엽서)	277	1386	1663	10
14–15	5	Kim Eun-young	Kim Wan-sun	"Dance in the Rhythm" (리듬 속의 그 춤을)	287	1476	1763	5
14–15	6	Ahn Yi-sook (Note: Featuring by Jennifer Jang, Yeom Jeong-mi and Kang Yoo-jin in the second half of stage.)	Kim Yeon-ja	"Amor Fati" (아모르 파티)	285	1528	1813	4
14–15	7	Lee Soo-bin	Hwasa	"María" (마리아)	269	1272	1541	12
14–15	8	Kim Da-na	Jang Yoon-jeong	"Jjan Jja Ra" (짠짜라)	281	1421	1702	7
14–15	9	Kim Wan-joon	Jin Sung	"At Andong Station" (안동역에서)	283	1400	1683	9
14–15	10	Kim Hyun-woo	Rain	"Love Song" (널 붙잡을 노래)	294	1629	1923	1
14–15	11	Jung Yoo-mi	Baek Ji-young	"Don't Forget" (잊지 말아요)	289	1557	1846	3
14–15	12	Jo Joon-ho	Kim Jong-kook	"One Man" (한 남자)	273	1431	1704	6
14–15	Special performance: Im Chang-jung – "Love Should Not Be Harsh on You" (힘든건 사랑이 아니다)							

== Season 7 ==
=== Regular episodes ===
List of regular episodes in season 7

Episode #	Air Date	Singer	Panel of Celebrities	Song	Round 1	Round 2	Round 3	Round 4		
Episode #	Air Date	Singer	Panel of Celebrities	Song	Round 1	Round 2	Round 3	Third place	Runner-up	Winner
1	August 19, 2022	Park Jung-hyun (Rematch)	Yoon Jong-shin, Song Eun-i, Hareem, Nam Chang-hee, Young Tak, Solbi, Park Seul-gi, Paul Kim, Hoppipolla, Gree, Billlie (Haram, Tsuki, Sheon)	R1: "I'll Write You a Letter" (편지할게요); R2: "You Mean Everything To Me"; R3: "A Stray Child" (미아); R4: "Love, Again" (다시 사랑이)	Park Jae-in	Cheon Ji-won	Kim Hye-bin	Cho Min-hee	Yu Min-ji	Park Jung-hyun
2	August 26, 2022	Sunmi	Sunwoo Yong-nyeo, Kim Soo-yong, Jo Hye-ryun, Hong Seok-cheon, Song Eun-i, Nam Chang-hee, Jo Kwon (2AM), Kim Min-ah, Cha Hyun-seung, La Poem, Oh My Girl (YooA, Yubin), Gree, WEi (Yoo Yong-ha, Kim Yo-han, Kang Seok-hwa)	R1: "Full Moon" (보름달); R2: "Gashina" (가시나); R3: "24 Hours" (24시간이 모자라); R4: "Siren" (사이렌)	Park Hye-joo	Kim Ji-yoon	Sunmi	Hondam	Saebom	Park Jin-ju (Note: Sunmi won the most number of votes but because she was eliminated before, Park Jin-ju became the final winner.)
3	September 2, 2022	Kim Min-jong	Lee Geung-young, Kim Soo-ro, Son Ji-chang, Jo Hye-ryun, Song Eun-i, Shin Bong-sun, Kim Min-ah, Raiden (DJ), Nam Chang-hee, Gree, Kep1er (Kim Da-yeon, Ezaki Hikaru, Kang Ye-seo)	R1: "Under the Sky" (하늘 아래서); R2: "Kind Love" (착한 사랑); R3: "With You" (그대와 함께); R4: "Beautiful Pain" (아름다운 아픔)	Lee Sang-hak	Jung Joo-young	Kim Young-hoon	Kim Chan	Park Sang-hyuk	Kim Min-jong
4	September 9, 2022	Song Ga-in	Song Eun-i, Nam Chang-hee, Gree, Jin Sung, Kim Kyung-ho, Kwak Dong-hyun, Lee Kye-in, Kim Da-hyun, Kim Tae-yeon, Park Jung-soo, Park Seul-gi, La Poem, Shin Ji (Koyote), Navi, Sook Haeng	R1: "Bitter Daedong River" (한 많은 대동강); R2: "Ga-in" (가인이어라); R3: "Mom Arirang" (엄마 아리랑); R4: "Moon of Seoul" (서울의 달)	Park Sa-rang	Kim Yoon-ju	Hong Ji-yun	Choi Na-ri	Song Ga-in	Park Sung-On (Male)
5	September 16, 2022	Kyuhyun (Super Junior)	Song Eun-i, Nam Chang-hee, Gree, Changmin (TVXQ), Min-ho (Shinee), Suho (Exo), Super Junior (Eunhyuk, Ryeowook), Soyou, Hong Ji-yun, Jo Hye-ryun, Lapillus (Chanty, Shana, Haeun), Whang Soo-kyeong, Kang Soo-jung	R1: "Confession Is Not Flashy" (화려하지 않은 고백); R2: "At Gwanghwamun" (광화문에서); R3: "U"; R4: "The Moment My Heart Flinched" (내 마음이 움찔했던 순간)	Lee Jung-hoon	Kyuhyun	Na Hui, Chan Hui	—N/a	Lee Se-heon	Lee Shin (Note: Kyuhyun won the most number of votes but because he was eliminated before, Lee Shin became the final winner.)
6	September 23, 2022	Choi Jung-hoon (Jannabi)	Song Eun-i, Nam Chang-hee, Gree, Kim Kwang-kyu, Hynn, Lee Eun-ji, Lee Sang-jun, Yoon Yoo-sun, Crying Nut, Kim Ji-sook, Hur Young-ji, Heo Song-Yeon, Narsha, Hong Ji-yun, Jannabi (Kim Do-hyung), Nmixx (Lily, Haewon, Bae)	R1: "She"; R2: "For Lovers Who Hesitate" (주저하는 연인들을 위해); R3: "Baby I Need You" (사랑하긴 했었나요 스쳐가는 인연이었나요 짧지않은 우리 함께했던 시간들이 자꾸 내 마음을 가둬두네); R4: "Summer" (뜨거운 여름밤은 가고 남은 건 볼품없지만)	Kim Joon	Kim Hyun-san	Park Kun-woo, Choi Jung-hoon (Note: Two participants were eliminated because both were tied for last place.)	—N/a	Yoo Do-yoon	Choi Jin-won
7	September 30, 2022	Uhm Jung-hwa	Song Eun-i, Nam Chang-hee, Gree, Joo Young-hoon, Joon Park, Koyote(Kim Jong-min, Shin Ji), La Poem, Yoo Hee-kwan, Aiki, Yoon Hye-jin, Hong Ji-yun, Shim Soo-chang, Danny Koo, Babylon, Sumin	R1: "Rose of Betrayal" (배반의 장미); R2: "Invitation" (초대); R3: "Poison"; R4: "Ending Credit"	(Japan) Yutsuki Uchimura	Ahn So-hyun	Ko Ye-rin	Im Soo-min	Choi Yu-mi	Uhm Jung-hwa
8	October 7, 2022	Jessi	Song Eun-i, Nam Chang-hee, Gree, Hong Ji-yun, Sunwoo Yong-nyeo, Lee Guk-joo, Pung-ja, Lee Eun Hyung, Lee Chae-yeon, Kang Jae-jun, La Poem, Kanto, Shorry, Billlie (Moon Sua, Siyoon, Sheon), DKZ (Kyoungyoon, Jonghyeong)	R1: "What Type of X" (어떤X); R2: "Ssenunni" (쎈언니); R3: "Life Is Good" (인생은 즐거워); R4: "Nunu Nana" (눈누난나)	Choi Ye-eun	Kim Min-young	Lee Jung-eum	Kwon Yoon-sul	Cho Ha-yool	Jessi
9	October 14, 2022	Shin Yong-jae	Song Eun-i, Gree, Lee Hye-jeong, Yoon Min-soo, Lee Bo-ram, 2F (Kim Won-joo), Shin Ji (Koyote), Seo Ji-seok, Lee Hyun-yi, 4Men (Joseph, Hanbin), Kardi, Song Hae-na, Lee Sung-jong, Baekho, JWiiver	R1: "Baby Baby"; R2: "Can't" (못해); R3: "Reason" (이유); R4: "The Reason I Became a Singer" (가수가 된 이유)	Kim Soo-ri	Lee Ho-seung	Moon Jong-min	Haeun	Kim Dong-hyun	Shin Yong-jae
10	October 21, 2022	Young Tak	Song Eun-i, Nam Chang-hee, Gree, Hong Ji-yun, Greg, Jeong Dong-won, La Poem, Shin In-Seon, Jang Dong-min, Kim Jung-min, Bang Eun-hee, Jung Sung-ho, Cosmic Girls (Subin, Eunseo, Seola), (Je Chong, Daison, Park Joon-young, Kim Jin-ho) (Note: Impersonators from Wheesung's Episode)	R1: "Nuna You're Perfect" (누나가 딱이야); R2: "Why Are You Coming Out From There" (니가 왜 거기서 나와); R3: "Comforter" (이불); R4: "Pitiful" (찐이야)	Ha Dong-geun	Song Geun-an	Kang Dae-woong	Oh Hye-bin	Kim Hwi-suk	Young Tak
11	October 28, 2022	Noh Sa-yeon	Song Eun-i, Nam Chang-hee, Hong Ji-yun, Lee Chan-won, Ji Sang-ryeol, Insooni, Jung Joon-ho, Noh Sa-bong, Alberto Mondi, Julian Quintart, Kim Woo-joong, Baek A-yeon, Kim Min-ah, Weeekly (Monday, Jihan, Zoa), CSR (Sua, Duna, Yeham)	R1: "The Meeting" (만남); R2: "Wish" (바램); R3: "In Circle" (돌고 돌아가는 가는길); R4: "Love" (사랑)	Cha Woo-ri	Jang Mi-young	Noh Sa-yeon	Shin Min-jae (Male)	Kim Myeng-Sun	Kim Ye-jin (Note: Noh Sa-yeon won the most number of votes but because she was eliminated before, Kim Ye-jin became the final winner.)
12	November 4, 2022	Late Kim Hyun-sik	Song Eun-i, Nam Chang-hee, Gree, Hong Ji-yun, La Poem, Kim Jong-jin (Bom Yeoreum Gaeul Kyeoul), Kwon In-ha, Baek Ji-young, Lyn, Jonathan Yiombi, CNEMA, Park Chang-Geun, Lee Solomon, Sole, Queenz Eye (Damin, Wonchae, Narin)	R1: "Making Memories" (추억 만들기); R2: "Like Rain, Like Music" (비처럼 음악처엄); R3: "Love Love Love" (사랑 사랑 사랑); R4: "My Love by My Side" (내 사랑 내 곁에)	Bang Won-sik	Kim Jung-su	Yang Kyung-jin	Kim Gwi-oh	Kim Jong-han	Kim Hyun-sik

=== King of Kings' Challenge ===
King of Hidden Singer in season 7

Episode #	Air date	Panel			Participants			
13–14	November 11, 2022 – November 18, 2022	Song Eun-i, Nam Chang-hee, Gree, La Poem, Im Chang-jung, Kim Min-jong, Jannabi (Choi Jung-hoon, Kim Do-hyung), Yoo Hee-kwan, Jang Ye-eun, Shim So-young, Parc Jae-jung, Ahn Young-mi, Pung-ja, Classy (Chaewon, Boeun, Seonyou), Mimiirose			The regular episodes' last survivors (excluded the singers)			
13–14	Stage #	Participant	Singer	Song	Votes			Rank
13–14	Stage #	Participant	Singer	Song	Panel (out of 250)	Viewers (out of 1750)	Total (out of 2000)	Rank
13–14	1	Yu Min-ji	Park Jung-hyun	"In the Dream" (꿈에)	242	1610	1852	5
13–14	2	Park Jin-ju	Sunmi	"Siren" (사이렌)	220	1292	1512	12
13–14	3	Park Sang-hyuk	Kim Min-jong	"Kind Love" (착한 사랑)	241	1566	1807	7
13–14	4	Park Sung-On	Song Ga-in	"Moon of Seoul" (서울의 달)	242	1707	1949	1
13–14	5	Lee Shin	Kyuhyun	"At Gwanghwamun" (광화문에서)	224	1495	1719	10
13–14	6	Choi Jin-won	Choi Jung-hoon	"For Lovers Who Hesitate" (주저하는 연인들을 위해)	248	1691	1939	2
13–14	7	Choi Yu-mi	Uhm Jung-hwa	"Poison"	241	1505	1746	9
13–14	Choi Jung-hoon's re-challenge							
13–14	Room #	Singer & Participant		Song	Votes (out of 199)			
13–14	1	Yoo Do-yoon		"A Thought on an Autumn Night" (가을밤에 든 생각)	10			
13–14	2	Park Kun-woo		"A Thought on an Autumn Night" (가을밤에 든 생각)	2			
13–14	3	Choi Jung-hoon		"A Thought on an Autumn Night" (가을밤에 든 생각)	45			
13–14	4	Kim Hyun-san		"A Thought on an Autumn Night" (가을밤에 든 생각)	81			
13–14	5	Choi Jin-won		"A Thought on an Autumn Night" (가을밤에 든 생각)	42			
13–14	6	Kim Joon		"A Thought on an Autumn Night" (가을밤에 든 생각)	19			
13–14	Special performance: Choi Jung-hoon and impersonators - "Baby I Need You" (사랑하긴 했었나요 스쳐가는 인연이었나요 짧지않은 우리 함께했던 시간들이 자꾸 내 마음을 가둬두네)							
13–14	Stage #	Participant	Singer	Song	Votes			Rank
13–14	Stage #	Participant	Singer	Song	Panel (out of 250)	Viewers (out of 1750)	Total (out of 2000)	Rank
13–14	8	Cho Ha-yool	Jessi	"Ssenunni" (쎈언니)	244	1627	1871	4
13–14	9	Kim Dong-hyun	Shin Yong-jae	"The Reason I Became a Singer" (가수가 된 이유)	237	1474	1711	11
13–14	10	Kim Hwi-suk	Young Tak	"Pitiful" (찐이야)	238	1533	1771	8
13–14	11	Kim Ye-jin	Noh Sa-yeon	"Wish" (바램)	245	1685	1930	3
13–14	12	Kim Jong-han	Late Kim Hyun-sik	"Like Rain, Like Music" (비처럼 음악처럼)	244	1578	1822	6
13–14	Special performance: Kim Min-jong and impersonators - "White Longing" (하얀 그리움)							

== Season 8 ==
=== Regular episodes ===
List of regular episodes in season 8

Episode #	Air Date	Singer	Panel of Celebrities	Song	Round 1	Round 2	Round 3	Round 4	Final Round (Note: Depending on the episode there may be four or five rounds in total.)		
Episode #	Air Date	Singer	Panel of Celebrities	Song	Round 1	Round 2	Round 3	Round 4	Third place	Runner-up	Winner
1 (Note: There are 5 rounds for this episode.) (Note: There are six (instead of five) participants for this episode, so the original singer did not participate in the first round. However, in this episode there are 5 rounds, so only one participant was eliminated in the second round.)	March 31, 2026	Sim Soo-bong	Song Eun-i, Kim Kwang-kyu, Lee Jong-hyuk, Son Tae-jin, Jasson, Shin Yang-soon (Note: Jasson's Mother), Bada, Choi So-hyun (Note: Bada's Impersonator, winner of both Bada's episode and Season 5 King of Kings' Challenge), K.Will, Im Woo-il, Billlie (Tsuki, Siyoon)	R1: "That Person Back Then" (그때 그 사람); R2: "Men are Ships, Women are Ports" (남자는 배 여자는 항구); R3: "What I All Care Is Love" (사랑밖엔 난 몰라); R4: "Binari" (비나리); R5: "Million Roses" (백만 송이 장미)	Jin Jeong-yeon	Jin Ha-young	Lee Jeong-eun	Choi Se-yeon	Lee Geum-sook	Choi Yeon-hwa	Sim Soo-bong
2	April 7, 2026	Younha	Song Eun-i, Lee Soo-young, Paul Kim, Ahyumi, Daniel Lindemann, Alberto Mondi, Tyler Rasch, Hur Young-ji, Im Woo-il, Orbit, Baby Dont Cry (Yihyun, Kumi, Mia, Beni)	R1: "Waiting" (기다리다); R2: "Password 486" (비밀번호 486); R3: "Broke Up Today" (오늘 헤어졌어요); R4: "Event Horizon" (사건의 지평선)	Ko Ye-jeong	Shim Eun-soo	Im Ga-young	—N/a	Yang Da-hye	Younha	Lee Ji-young
3	April 14, 2026	Kim Jang-hoon	Song Eun-i, Kim Jong-seo, Lee Se-dol, Park So-hyun, Young Tak, Jo-bin (Norazo), Jung Seung-hwan, Yang Se-chan, Go Eun-ah, Fifty Fifty (Chanelle Moon, Athena, Yewon)	R1: "If You're Like Me" (나와 같다면); R2: "Monologue" (혼잣말); R3: "Highway Romance" (고속도로 로망스); R4: "Honey"; R5: "Shower" (소나기)	Jung Se-jin	Kim Jun-sik	Han Keon-hee	Cho Yong-joo	—N/a	Jo Jae-il	Kim Jang-hoon
4	April 21, 2026	Lee Hae-ri (Davichi)	Song Eun-i, Kang Min-kyung (Davichi), Kwaktube, Soyou, Park Tae-hwan, Kim Jun-ho, Yoon Nam-no, Yang Sang-guk, Leo Ranta, Jenny Park, Kiss of Life (Julie, Natty, Belle, Haneul)	R1: "Even Though I Hate You, I Love You" (미워도 사랑하니까); R2: "8282"; R3: "Don't You Know" (모르시나요); R4: "Don't Say Goodbye" (안녕이라고 말하지마)	Kim Ye-hu	Kim Da-ye	Im Mi-hyun	—N/a	Kwak Ji-eun	Lee Hae-ri	Choi Yoon-jung
5	April 28, 2026	Kim Hyun-jung	Song Eun-i, Hong Kyung-min, Jang Seo-hee, Kim Dae-ho, Park Eun-young, Honey J, Risabae, Hynn, Dayoung, Kim Ji-yu, Im Woo-il	R1: "Love Alone" (혼자한 사랑); R2: "Break Up With Her" (그녀와의 이별); R3: "Returned Break Up" (되돌아온 이별); R4: "Bruise" (멍)	Lee Soo-jung	Yoo Hye-ri	Lee Jin-hwa	—N/a	Choi Yun-ji	Kim Hyun-jung	Jo Ha-neul
6	May 5, 2026	10cm	Song Eun-i, Ko Young-bae (Soran), Lee Won-suk (Daybreak), Lee Hyun-yi, Song Haena, Heo Kyung-hwan, Kang Jae-jun, Libelante (Kim Ji-hoon, Jin Won, Roh Hyun-woo), TWS (Shinyu, Youngjae, Kyungmin)	R1: "Love in the Milky Way Cafe" (사랑은 은하수 다방에서); R2: "To Reach You" (너에게 닿기를); R3: "Stalker" (스토커); R4: "Gradation" (그라데이션)	Jo Jung-yeon	Lee Hyeok-ju	Kwak Un-seob	—N/a	Lee Je-woo	Bae Seong-su	10cm
7	May 12, 2026	Ha Hyun-woo (Guckkasten)	Song Eun-i, Cha Chung-hwa, Yangpa, Lee Chang-ho, Park Wan-kyu, Lee Yoon-seok, Jung Sung-ho, Im Woo-il, Guckkasten (Jeon Kyu-ho, Lee Jung-gil, Kim Ki-bum), La Poem (You Chae-hoon, Jeong Min-seong, Choi Sung-hoon), NAZE (Younki, Ato)	R1: "Everyday I Wait" (매일 매일 기다려); R2: "Diamond" (돌덩이); R3: "KICK OUT"; R4: "Lazenca, Save Us"	Hwang Seok-gyu	Kim Do-hyun	Choi Jo-hong	—N/a	Song Woo-seok	Kim Kwang-jin	Ha Hyun-woo
8	May 19, 2026	Late Turtleman (Turtles)	Song Eun-i, Pyo Chang-won, Kwon Il-yong, Park So-hyun, Shin Bong-sun, Im Woo-il, Park So-ra, Turtles (Geum Bi, Z-E), Hanhae, B1A4 (Sandeul, CNU, Gongchan)	R1: "Bingo" (빙고); R2: "What Happen" (왜 이래); R3: "Airplane" (비행기); R4: "Sing Lala" (싱랄라)	Cho Hyun-min	Park Tae-hyeok, Kim Yoon-gil	The Ray	—N/a	Moon Se-yoon	Turtleman	Park Hyun-bin
9	May 26, 2026	Jung-in	Song Eun-i, Jo Jung-chi, Johan Kim, Ra.D, Park Jun Myeon, Lee Seo-hwan, Ryu Hyun-kyung, Yoon Yoo-sun, Sayuri Fujita, Im Woo-il, Kim Hae-jun, Na Bo-ram, Queenz Eye (Seovin, Seoha)	R1: "Love Is" (사랑은); R2: "I Hate You" (미워요); R3: "Rainy Season" (장마); R4: "Uphill Road" (오르막길)	Im Je-i	Ko Ye-rin	Min Seo-yoon	—N/a	Kim Bo-ra	Kang Hee-su	Jung-in
10	June 2, 2026	Lee Seung-gi	Song Eun-i, Kim Young-ok, Hong Seok-cheon, Lee Joo-yeon, Ahn Jae-hyun, Lee Hong-gi (F.T. Island), Lee Jin-sung (Monday Kiz), Kim Jae-hwan, Shin Gi-ru, Jeong Hong-il, Lee So-jung, EJel, Im Woo-il	R1: “Delete” (삭제); R2: “Because You’re My Woman” (내 여자라니까); R3: “Will You Marry Me” (결혼해줄래); R4: “Return” (되돌리다)	Joo Young-hoon	Ryu Hyun-seo	Im Seong-joo	—N/a	Lee Seung-gi	Ma Jae-kyung	Choi Jun-seo

=== King of Kings' Challenge ===
King of Hidden Singer in season 8

Episode #	Air date	Panel			Participants			
11-12	June 9, 2026 – June 16, 2026	Song Eun-i, Kim Jang-hoon, Younha, Kim Hyun-jung, Koyote (Shin Ji, Bbaek Ga), Turtles (Geum Bi, Z-E), Moon Se-yoon, Young Tak, Son Tae-jin, Lim Han-byul, Lee Kyu-han, Park Ha-na, Lee Yeon-doo, Secret (Hyoseong, Zinger, Yebin), Kardi (Park da-wool, Yeji), U Sung-eun, Billlie (Moon Sua, Haram, Sheon), Kinky, Lngshot (Ohyul, Ryul, Woojin), Kang Kyun-sung, Im Woo-il			The regular episodes' last survivors (excluded the singers)			
11-12	Special performance: Kim Hyun-jung - "Bruise" (멍)							
11-12	Stage #	Participant	Singer	Song	Votes			Rank
11-12	Stage #	Participant	Singer	Song	Panel (out of 300)	Viewers (out of 1,700)	Total (out of 2,000)	Rank
11-12	1	Choi Yeon-hwa	Sim Soo-bong	"What I All Care Is Love" (사랑밖엔 난 몰라)	276	1376	1650	9
11-12	2	Lee Ji-young	Younha	"Password 486" (비밀번호 486)	272	1537	1809	5
11-12	3	Jo Jae-il	Kim Jang-hoon	"Honey"	258	1437	1695	8
11-12	4	Choi Yoon-jung	Lee Hae-ri	"Don't Say Goodbye" (안녕이라고 말하지마)	274	1480	1754	7
11-12	5	Jo Ha-neul	Kim Hyun-jung	"Break Up With Her" (그녀와의 이별)	287	1588	1875	3
11-12	Younha's re-challenge							
11-12	Room #	Singer & Participant		Song	Votes (out of 197)			
11-12	1	Shim Eun-soo		"Comet" (혜성)	12			
11-12	2	Ko Ye-jeong		"Comet" (혜성)	35			
11-12	3	Yang Da-hye		"Comet" (혜성)	51			
11-12	4	Younha		"Comet" (혜성)	58			
11-12	5	Im Ga-young		"Comet" (혜성)	23			
11-12	6	Lee Ji-young		"Comet" (혜성)	18			
11-12	Special performance: Younha and impersonators - "Oort Cloud" (오르트구름)							
11-12	Stage #	Participant	Singer	Song	Votes			Rank
11-12	Stage #	Participant	Singer	Song	Panel (out of 300)	Viewers (out of 1,700)	Total (out of 2,000)	Rank
11-12	6	Bae Seong-su	10cm	"Stalker" (스토커)	285	1600	1885	2
11-12	7	Kim Kwang-jin	Ha Hyun-woo	"Lazenca, Save Us"	284	1575	1859	4
11-12	8	Park Hyun-bin	Late Turtleman	"What Happen" (왜 이래)	276	1505	1781	6
11-12	9	Kang Hee-su	Jung-in	"Love Is" (사랑은)	297	1641	1938	1
11-12	10	Choi Jun-seo	Lee Seung-gi	"Because You're My Woman" (내 여자라니까)	256	1350	1606	10
11-12	Kim Jang-hoon's re-challenge							
11-12	Room #	Singer & Participant		Song	Votes (out of 197)			
11-12	1	Jung Se-jin		"I am a Man" (난 남자다)	27			
11-12	2	Han Keon-hee		"I am a Man" (난 남자다)	23			
11-12	3	Kim Jang-hoon		"I am a Man" (난 남자다)	46			
11-12	4	Kim Jun-sik		"I am a Man" (난 남자다)	13			
11-12	5	Jo Jae-il		"I am a Man" (난 남자다)	58			
11-12	6	Cho Yong-joo		"I am a Man" (난 남자다)	30			
11-12	Special performance: Kim Jang-hoon and impersonators - "Even If the World Tricks You" (세상이 그대를 속일지라도)							

== Ratings ==
In the ratings below, the highest rating for each season will be in red, and the lowest rating for the show will be in blue each for each season.

=== Season 1 ===
AGB Nielsen	Pilot		Regular episodes														
AGB Nielsen	1	2	3	4	5	6	7	8	9	10	11	12	13	14	15	16	17
Nationwide	%	%	1.095%	1.443%	1.585%	2.262%	2.017%	4.327%	%	3.707%	4.003%	4.421%	4.168%	4.591%	%	4.017%	4.282%

=== Season 2 ===
AGB Nielsen	Regular episodes															
AGB Nielsen	1	2	3	4	5	6	7	8	9	10	11	12	13	14	15	16
Nationwide	3.508%	4.368%	5.137%	4.748%	5.470%	4.198%	5.515%	5.422%	4.873%	6.347%	4.270%	6.347%	4.413%	5.891%	6.904%	8.616%

=== Season 3 ===
AGB Nielsen	Special episodes			Regular episodes															
AGB Nielsen	Begin 1	Begin 2	0	1	2	3	4	5	6	7	8	9	10	11	12	13	14	15	16
Nationwide	1.867%	2.342%	4.317%	7.181%	5.548%	5.562%	5.415%	5.750%	4.257%	5.536%	5.945%	4.695%	5.183%	5.608%	3.933%	5.762%	5.794%	6.146%	5.575%

=== Season 4 ===
AGB Nielsen	Regular episodes															
AGB Nielsen	1	2	3	4	5	6	7	8	9	10	11	12	13	14	15	16
Nationwide	4.866%	4.499%	4.054%	4.145%	4.369%	4.700%	3.600%	5.000%	6.800%	5.432%	4.604%	4.877%	2.616%	4.383%	4.571%	5.215%
Seoul Capital Area	5.664%	4.924%	4.118%	4.948%	4.887%	4.800%	3.600%	5.700%	7.100%	5.991%	4.699%	5.568%	2.556%	4.832%	5.052%	5.518%

=== Season 5 ===
Ratings		Special	Regular episodes																
Ratings		Special	1	2	3	4	5	6	7	8	9	10	11	12	13	14	15	16	17
AGB	Nationwide	3.684%	5.481%	5.383%	7.916%	6.905%	7.339%	4.399%	7.229%	6.378%	5.372%	7.537%	5.086%	5.469%	3.920%	5.802%	5.141%	3.900%	4.020%
AGB	Seoul	4.400%	6.022%	5.691%	8.765%	8.228%	7.678%	5.176%	7.991%	6.846%	6.390%	8.492%	5.682%	6.414%	4.467%	6.393%	5.321%	4.287%	4.781%
TNmS	Nationwide	—	6.4%	5.4%	8.1%	7.8%	7.7%	5.6%	8.6%	8.1%	6.3%	8.0%	5.9%	6.8%	4.9%	6.8%	5.6%	4.9%	4.6%

=== Season 6 ===
AGB Nielsen	Special		Regular episodes													
AGB Nielsen	0	7	1	2	3	4	5	6	8	9	10	11	12	13	14	15
Nationwide	4.594%	2.826%	8.306%	5.026%	7.097%	9.648%	7.640%	5.545%	3.922%	5.789%	8.652%	5.180%	4.151%	4.618%	3.718%	3.877%
Seoul	4.493%	2.955%	8.272%	5.556%	7.589%	10.302%	8.770%	5.861%	4.017%	5.716%	8.177%	5.868%	4.215%	4.893%	3.989%	3.797%

=== Season 7 ===
AGB Nielsen	Regular episodes													
AGB Nielsen	1	2	3	4	5	6	7	8	9	10	11	12	13	14
Nationwide	3.880%	2.699%	3.235%	6.308%	3.425%	3.595%	4.275%	3.118%	3.885%	5.327%	4.594%	4.257%	3.664%	3.966%
Seoul	3.846%	2.832%	3.525%	5.834%	3.811%	3.939%	4.816%	3.534%	4.543%	5.176%	4.289%	4.272%	3.950%	3.878%

=== Season 8 ===
AGB Nielsen	Regular episodes											
AGB Nielsen	1	2	3	4	5	6	7	8	9	10	11	12
Nationwide	4.554%	2.560%	2.728%	2.907%	2.896%	2.540%	2.609%	2.655%	2.379%	2.756%	2.832%	2.487%
Seoul	3.993%	2.692%	2.317%	2.960%	2.879%	2.515%	2.415%	2.646%	2.394%	2.506%	2.777%	2.335%

Note: This program airs on a cable channel/pay TV which normally has a relatively smaller audience compared to free-to-air TV/public broadcasters (KBS, SBS, MBC and EBS).
