= Park Sang-min =

Park Sang-min (Korean: 박상민) is a Korean name consisting of the family name Park and the given name Sang-min, and may also refer to:

- Park Sang-min (singer) (born 1964), South Korean singer
- Park Sang-min (actor) (born 1970), South Korean actor
