= Bom Yeoreum Gaeul Kyeoul =

South Korean band

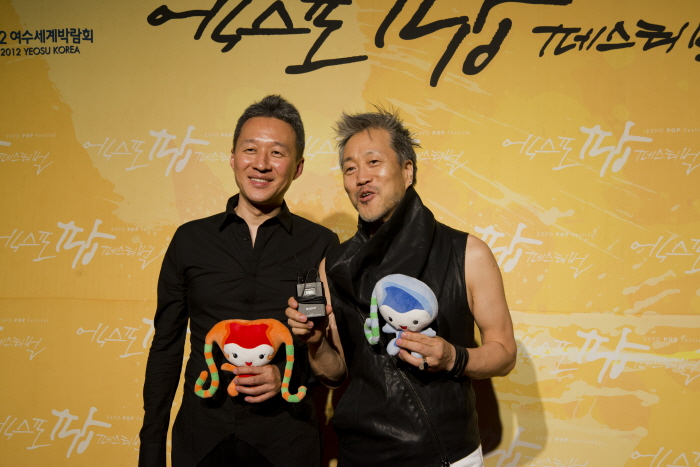
- In 2014

Background information
- Genres: Jazz-rock fusion
- Years active: 1988-2018
- Past members: Kim Jong-jin; Jeon Tae-gwan
- Website: www.ssaw.co.kr

Bom Yeoreum Gaeul Kyeoul (Korean: 봄여름가을겨울; lit. 'Spring Summer Autumn Winter'), also known as SSAW, was a jazz-rock fusion band from South Korea.

SSAW debuted in 1988. It had the hit songs, "Bravo, My Life," and "Somebody's Dream." SSAW disbanded on December 28, 2018, following the death of member Tae-gwan.

In 1986, Jong Jin-sim, Tae-kwan Jeon, Jae-ha Yoo, and Ki-ho Jang formed a group named Bom Yeoreum Gaeul Kyeoul (meaning "spring, summer, fall, winter" in Korean) with Kim Hyun-sik.

On December 28, 2018, it was announced that Tae Kwan had died after a 6-year battle with cancer, effectively ending SSAW.

== Discography ==
=== Studio albums ===
Title	Album details	Peak chart positions	Sales
Title	Album details	KOR	Sales
Bom Yeoreum Gaeul Kyeoul	Released: June 16, 1988; Label: Seorabeol Records; Format: LP	No data*	No data*
Bom Yeoreum Gaeul Kyeoul 2	Released: October 5, 1989; Label: Seorabeol Records; Format: LP	No data*	No data*
Joke, Lie and Truth (농담, 거짓말 그리고 진실)	Released: January 1992; Label: Seorabeol Records; Format: LP	No data*	No data*
1 Photograph To Remember	Released: June 1993; Label: Donga Corporation; Format: LP	No data*	No data*
Mystery	Released: February 1, 1995; Label: Donga Corporation, Yejeon Media; Format: CD	No data*	No data*
Banana Shake	Released: August 1, 1996; Label: Donga Corporation, Yejeon Media; Format: CD	No data*	No data*
Bravo My Life	Released: January 3, 2002; Label: Donga Corporation; Format: CD	22	KOR: 65,858+
Beautiful, Beautiful! (아름답다, 아름다워!)	Released: September 9, 2008; Label: Bom Yeoreum Gaeul Kyeoul Entertainment; Format: CD	No data*	No data*
* Data not available prior to 1999. Data for 2008 is incomplete.
