= Yurisangja =

South Korean musical duo

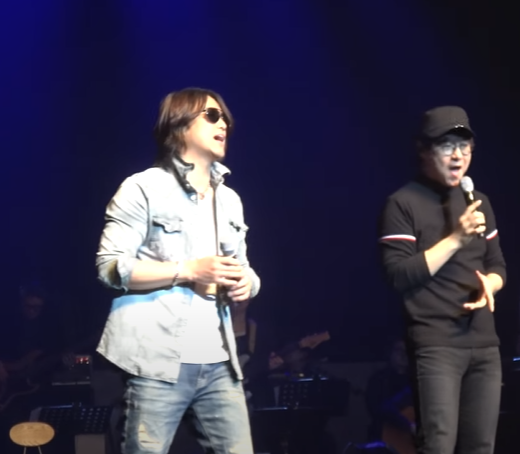
- L-R: Park Seung-hwa & Lee Se-jun

Background information
- Origin: Seoul, South Korea
- Genres: K-pop, Folk rock
- Years active: 1997–present
- Labels: J Planet Entertainment (2011–present)
- Members: Park Seung-hwa; Lee Se-jun
- Website: www.yurisangja.co.kr

Yurisangja is a South Korean male duo formed in 1997. They are best known for their pop-ballads.

== Name ==
"Yurisangja" (유리상자) means "glass box." The reason they chose it was derived from their hope – the one of putting in it the most precious things of the world. Because a glass box is transparent, as far as something valuable is put in that box, it can be seen, undistorted, from the outside. They wanted to show people the most precious and beautiful things of the world as they are.

== History ==
Park Seung-hwa made his debut as a solo singer in 1993. While Park was singing the 2nd album songs, Lee Se-jun, also a solo singer back then that was popular among girls with albums with cartoonish concepts, participated in the chorus for Park's performance. So, they made a team – Yurisangja. The duo first had a debut concert through an online independent internet broadcasting station m2tv. This duo released its first album in 1997, 'The True Love Story'. It received rave reviews, and won and maintained popularity for a long period. The 2nd album, 'Looking for Love', was released in 1998. Its title song was '331', which was much loved and proved Yurisangja's popularity, though it had religious tints. The 3rd album, Be Happy, released in 1999 ranked high in almost all charts, and became a frequently used wedding song. It gave the best songwriter award to Lee, who wrote its lyrics. In the 4th album, 'Home', they changed their style by making album themselves. Afterwards, they, having tried a 'dynamic' change, went back again to a 'static' stage on which they released their 5th album, ‘Sinabro (Little by Little)’ in 2001.'Can We Love?', the title of the 5th album, hit the jackpot so that it makes them the king of ballad. Yurisangja, with their enduring popularity, have been continuously loved of fans through the 6th album title 'A Good Day' and the 7th album title 'Still.'

== Members ==
- Park Seung-hwa (Hangul: 박승화; born 11 March 1969)
- Lee Se-jun (Hangul: 이세준; born 6 July 1972)

== Discography ==
=== Studio albums ===
Title	Album details	Peak chart positions		Sales
Title	Album details	KOR (MIAK)	KOR (Circle)	Sales
Yurisangja (유리상자)	Released: September 1997; Label: Doremi; Format: CD, cassette	N/A	N/A	
Looking for Love (사랑찾기)	Released: August 1998; Label: Doremi; Format: CD, cassette	17	N/A	KOR: 83,758
Be Happy	Released: September 9, 1999; Label: Doremi; Format: CD, cassette	9	N/A	KOR: 152,572
Home	Released: October 16, 2000; Label: Doremi; Format: CD, cassette	7	N/A	KOR: 140,505
Little By Little (시나브로)	Released: December 3, 2001; Label: Seoul Records; Format: CD, cassette	8	N/A	KOR: 193,245
Favorite	Released: December 5, 2002; Label: Seoul Records; Format: CD, cassette	13	N/A	KOR: 56,568
Family (가족)	Released: December 9, 2003; Label: Plyzen; Format: CD, cassette	5	N/A	KOR: 40,582
Back to the First Time (다시 처음으로)	Released: October 4, 2004; Label: BMG; Format: CD, cassette	14	N/A	KOR: 26,191
A Few Good Men	Released: November 24, 2006; Label: Sony BMG; Format: CD	28	N/A	KOR: 2,857
All That YuriSangja	Released: April 15, 2008; Label: Sony BMG; Format: CD	21	N/A	KOR: 5,127
Volume 11 (11집)	Released: November 11, 2010; Label: JJ Holic Media; Format: CD, digital download	N/A	14	
Twenty (스무살)	Released: September 1, 2017; Label: JJ Holic Media; Format: CD, digital download	N/A	43	
"—" denotes release did not chart.

== Awards ==
- KBS Music Award (1999) – Best Songwriter
- The 13th Seoul Music Award (2002) – Best Folk Song Singer
