= Lee Yoon-mi =

South Korean actress and entrepreneur (born 1981)

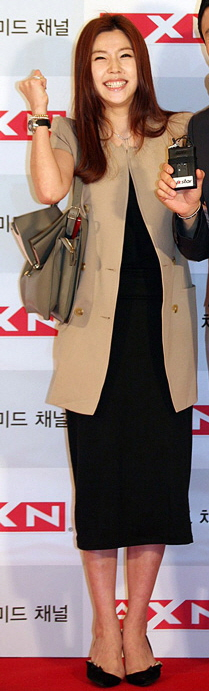
- Born: September 25, 1981 (age 45); South Korea
- Education: Dongguk University - Theater and Film
- Occupation: Actress
- Years active: 2002–present
- Agent(s): Green Snake Juna E&M
- Spouse: Joo Young-hoon (m. 2006)
- Children: 2

Korean name
- Hangul: 이윤미
- RR: I Yunmi
- MR: I Yunmi

Lee Yoon-mi (Korean: 이윤미; born September 25, 1981) is a South Korean actress and entrepreneur.

== Career ==
Lee Yoon-mi won the top prize in the Super Elite Model Best Talent Awards in 1998. She made her entertainment debut in 2003 as a member of the K-pop/dance girl group THE S (더에스).

Afterwards, Lee transitioned into acting, appearing in television dramas such as Little Women (2004) and My Love (2006). She also played the lead actress in the stage musical The Golden Days in 2011.

In 2007, Lee founded the online shop Coconut Island.

== Personal life ==
=== Marriage and family ===
Lee married singer and composer Joo Young-hoon on October 28, 2006. They have two daughters - Joo Ara, who was born on March 24, 2010, and Joo Ra-el, who was born on August 4, 2015.

=== Philanthropy ===
Lee also sponsors children through Compassion International, an organization founded in 1952 to help children orphaned by war in South Korea.

== Filmography ==
=== Television series ===
| Year | Title | Role | Network |
|---|---|---|---|
| 2004 | Little Women | Jung In-deuk | SBS |
| 2005 | My Lovely Sam Soon | Jang Chae-ri | MBC |
| 2006 | My Love | Seo Hee-jae | SBS |
| 2007 | Bad Woman, Good Woman | Kim Tae-hee | MBC |
| 2007 | Soaring High | Yoo Ji-eun | SBS |
| 2011 | Dream High | Maeng Seung-hee | KBS2 |
| 2013 | Two Women's Room | Monica Kim (cameo, episode 58) | SBS |
| 2013 | Let's Eat | Pet shop owner (cameo, episode 11) | tvN |
| 2014 | Can We Fall in Love, Again? | Kang Soo-hee (cameo, episode 6) | jTBC |
| 2014 | Triangle | Madam Jang | MBC |
| 2015 | Iron Lady Cha | Oh Dal-ja | MBC |
| 2022 | Sponsor | Soo-ah | IHQ |

=== Variety show ===
| Year | Title |
|---|---|
| 2002 | Declaration of Freedom Saturday - War of the Roses |
| 2016 | King of Mask Singer |

== Musical theatre ==
| Year | Title | Role |
|---|---|---|
| 2011 | The Golden Days | Butterfly Fairy |
