= Joo Young-hoon =

South Korean singer, songwriter, TV personality

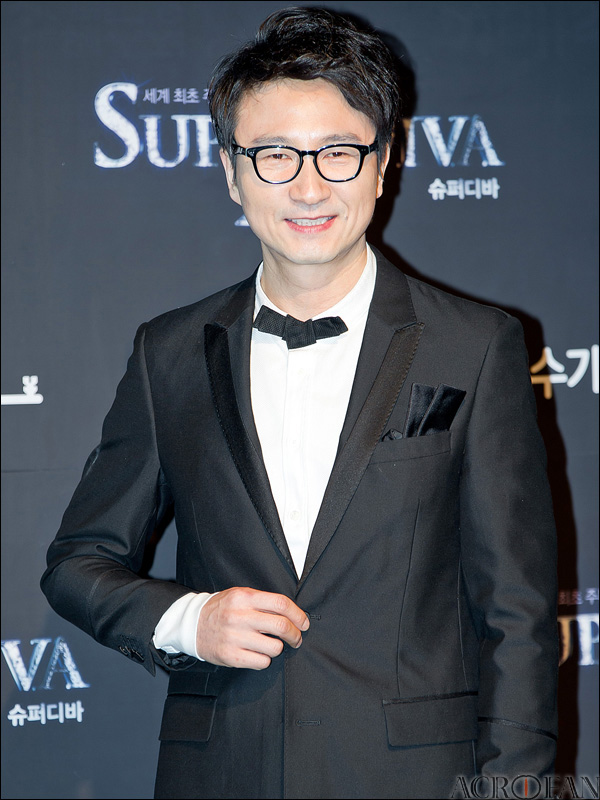

Background information
- Born: November 6, 1969 (age 57); South Korea
- Genres: K-pop, R&B
- Occupations: composer; songwriter; singer
- Years active: 1994–present
- Spouse: Lee Yoon-mi (m. 2006)

Korean name
- Hangul: 주영훈
- Hanja: 朱榮勳
- RR: Ju Yeonghun
- MR: Chu Yŏnghun

Joo Young-hoon (Korean: 주영훈; born November 6, 1969) is a South Korean singer, songwriter, and television personality. He began his career as a songwriter in the 1990s, composing hit songs for artists including Uhm Jung-hwa, Turbo and Koyote. He debuted as a singer in 1997 with the album Ballad, which he followed with Nostalgia in 2000, and Love Concerto in 2001.

== Discography ==
=== Studio albums ===
Title	Album details	Peak chart positions	Sales
Title	Album details	KOR	Sales
Ballad	Released: 1997; Label: Mijieum; Format: CD, cassette	—N/a	—N/a
Nostalgia	Released: March 21, 2000; Label: Star Music; Format: CD, cassette	9	KOR: 89,384
Love Concerto	Released: March 2, 2001; Label: Mirae Entertainment; Format: CD, cassette	23	KOR: 27,382
"—" denotes releases that did not chart or were not released in that region.

== Filmography ==
=== TV drama ===
Year	Title	Role
2021	Imitation	F Reze (Ep. 3)

=== Television shows ===
Year	Title	Role	Notes	Ref.
2022	Fantastic Family	Judge		
2023	Big Brother Era	Regular Member		

=== As composer ===
Year	Title	Singers	Ref.
2003	"Shine"	Sugar	

== Personal life ==
Joo married actress Lee Yoon-mi on October 28, 2006. They have two daughters – Joo Ara, who was born on March 24, 2010, and Joo Ra-el, who was born on August 4, 2015.
