= Park Sang-min (singer) =

South Korean singer

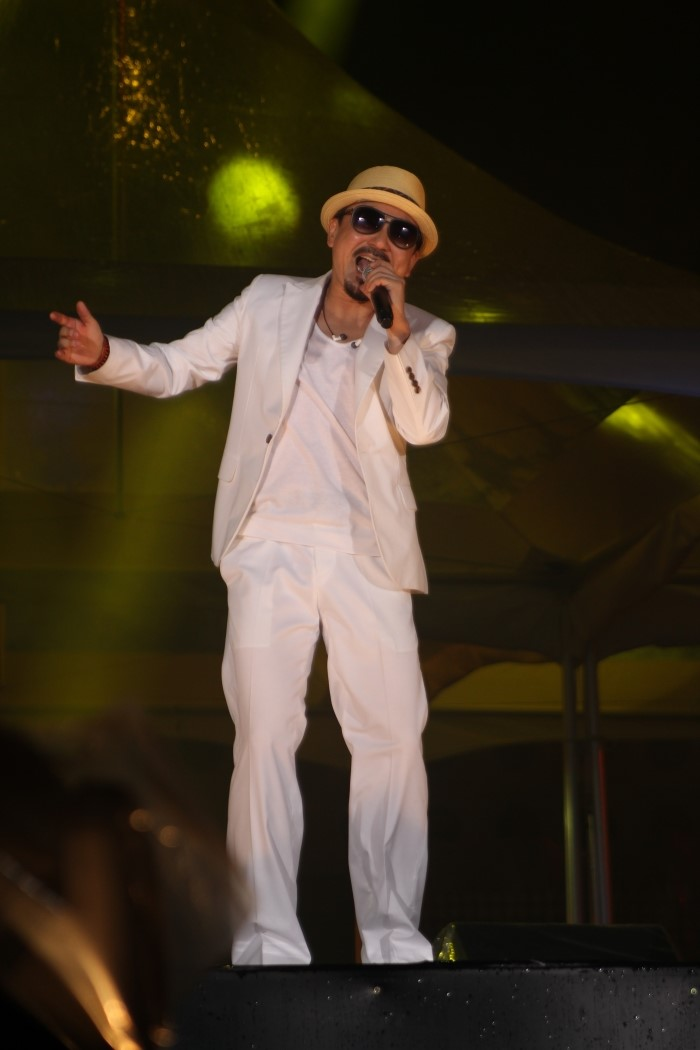

Background information
- Born: May 2, 1964 (age 62); Pyeongtaek, South Korea
- Genre: Rock
- Occupations: Singer
- Years active: 1986–present

Korean name
- Hangul: 박상민
- Hanja: 朴相敏
- RR: Bak Sangmin
- MR: Pak Sangmin

Birth name
- Hangul: 박덕만
- Hanja: 朴德萬
- RR: Bak Deokman
- MR: Pak Tŏngman

Park Sang-min (Korean: 박상민; born May 2, 1964) is a South Korean rock singer. In 2004, he received the SBS Gayo Daejeon.

== Filmography ==
=== Television show ===
- King of Mask Singer (MBC, 2017) – Contestant as "Are You Mask King, Jenga?" (episodes 99 and 100)

== Ambassadorship ==
- Public Relations Ambassador of Boryeong Marine Mud Expo (2022)
