= Kim Hyun-sik =

South Korean singer (1958–1990)

- 김현식
- Born: 7 January 1958; Seoul, South Korea
- Died: 1 November 1990 (aged 32); Seoul, South Korea
- Occupations: Singer; songwriter
- Musical career
- Genres: Folk rock; pop rock; blues rock
- Instruments: Vocals; guitar; harmonica
- Years active: 1980−1990

Korean name
- Hangul: 김현식
- Hanja: 金賢植
- RR: Gim Hyeonsik
- MR: Kim Hyŏnsik

Kim Hyun-sik (Korean: 김현식; 7 January 1958 – 1 November 1990) was a South Korean musician, active during the 1980s. He debuted in 1980, releasing his debut studio album, Spring Summer Fall Winter, along with his band of the same name. He died at the age of 32 from cirrhosis. He is recognized as one of the most popular and notable musicians of the 1980s in Korea, well known for his unique, husky, emotional vocal style. Kim released five albums while alive, with his sixth album—Kim Hyun-sik VI, popularly known by the title of its lead single, "My Love By My Side"—being released posthumously. Kim broke out of the hospital to finish the vocal recordings for his last album, showing his dedication to his profession. He won the Disc Daesang (Album of the Year) award at the 1991 Golden Disc Awards, the Korean approximation of the Grammy Awards, for his posthumous sixth album, Kim Hyun-sik VI. Kim was also honored by having three episodes of the popular singing competition show Immortal Songs 2 dedicated to his music.

== Early life ==
Kim Hyun-sik was born in Inhyeon-dong, Seoul, South Korea on January 7, 1958. He attended MyongJi High School but dropped out in 1974 to pursue his life as a singer. It is known that the reason for this was a fight with several upperclassmen and many say that the fight was caused because Kim touched his band member's instrument without permission. After dropping out of high school, he passed the 1975 Korean school qualification exam and begin his musical career in the downtown area, preparing for his 1978 album.

== Career ==
=== First album: Spring Summer Fall Winter ===
In 1976, Kim began to work with Jang-hee Lee on his first album, Spring Summer Fall Winter. However, after the recordings were finished in 1978, the album was cancelled due to Jang-hee Lee's sudden move to the United States. Additionally, Kim was arrested for his use of marijuana, which had devastating effects on his public image. In 1980, Kim was finally able to publish his album with Seorabul Records two years later. The result did not go well and Kim spent most of his music career at this time in the underground.

=== Second album: I Loved You ===
After the restaurant he owned went out of business, Kim returned to music and recorded his second album in 1984. The album, I Loved You, became a success and helped Kim stabilize his career as a singer. During this time, Kim became the lead singer of several underground bands, including The Eastern Light (동방의 빛), Black Butterfly (검은 나비), and the Messengers (메신저스).

=== Third album: Spring Summer Fall Winter – Like Rain, Like Music ===
It was not until 1985 when Kim decided to create a band of his own. The band took the same name as his first album, Spring Summer Fall Winter (SSaW). The members were Kim Jong-jin, Jeon Tae-guan, Jang Gi-ho, Yoo Jae-ha, and Kim. This was the first band that Kim officially lead. During this time, Kim's parents and sister immigrated to Canada, and his wife began to live separately from him. The band's album, titled Like Rain, Like Music, sold over 300,000 copies, becoming an instant success. However, the band quickly disbanded due to differences in music styles.

== Personal life ==
=== Marriage and family ===
Kim met his wife at a clothes shop in Sinchon County. The couple married in 1982. In 1983, his son, Travis Kim, was born. Kim and his family lived in Dongbu Ichon-dong where they opened a pizza place in 1983. In the documentary produced by MBC for the 20th anniversary of Kim's death, it is mentioned that Kim referred to this time as the happiest time of his life. The pizza place soon went out of business after one year in 1984.

=== Alcohol and other drugs ===
Jeon In-kwon, Heo Seong-wook, Kim, and a number of others were arrested in October 1987 for drug use. Kim was also known for his addiction to alcohol and cigarettes which severely affected his health. In February 1988, Kim opened a concert at the 63 Building for his fans. As an apology, Kim performed on stage after shaving his head bald. Later on, Kim mentioned that this concert was the most memorable concert of his life as he was so deeply moved by how many fans had come to see him.

=== Later life ===
In 1989, Kim collaborated with SinChon Blues on their second album, helping write the song "Alley". Kim's fourth album, published in 1988, contained songs related to his struggle with alcohol. Kim continued to rely on alcohol through 1989, and he was hospitalized several times. In 1989, Kim recorded the soundtrack of the movie Watercolor Painting in a Rainy Day, along with its title song. In 1990, Kim released his fifth album and the third SinChon Blues album at the same time. Even as his health declined, Kim continued to tour South Korea.

== Death ==
Kim was found dead in his house on 1 November 1990. His death was caused by cirrhosis. Kim's funeral was held on November 3, at 10:00 in the morning.

== Discography ==
- Spring Summer Fall Winter (1집 봄여름가을겨울; 1980)
- I Loved You (2집 사랑했어요; 1984)
- Like Rain, Like Music (3집 비처럼 음악처럼; 1986)
- Kim Hyun-sik VOL. 4 (4집 김현식 VOL. 4; 1988)
- KIM HYUN SIK (5집 KIM HYUN SIK; 1990)
- KIM HYUN SIK VOL. 6 (6집 KIM HYUN SIK VOL. 6; 1991)
