= Ha Hyun-sang =

South Korean singer (born 1998)

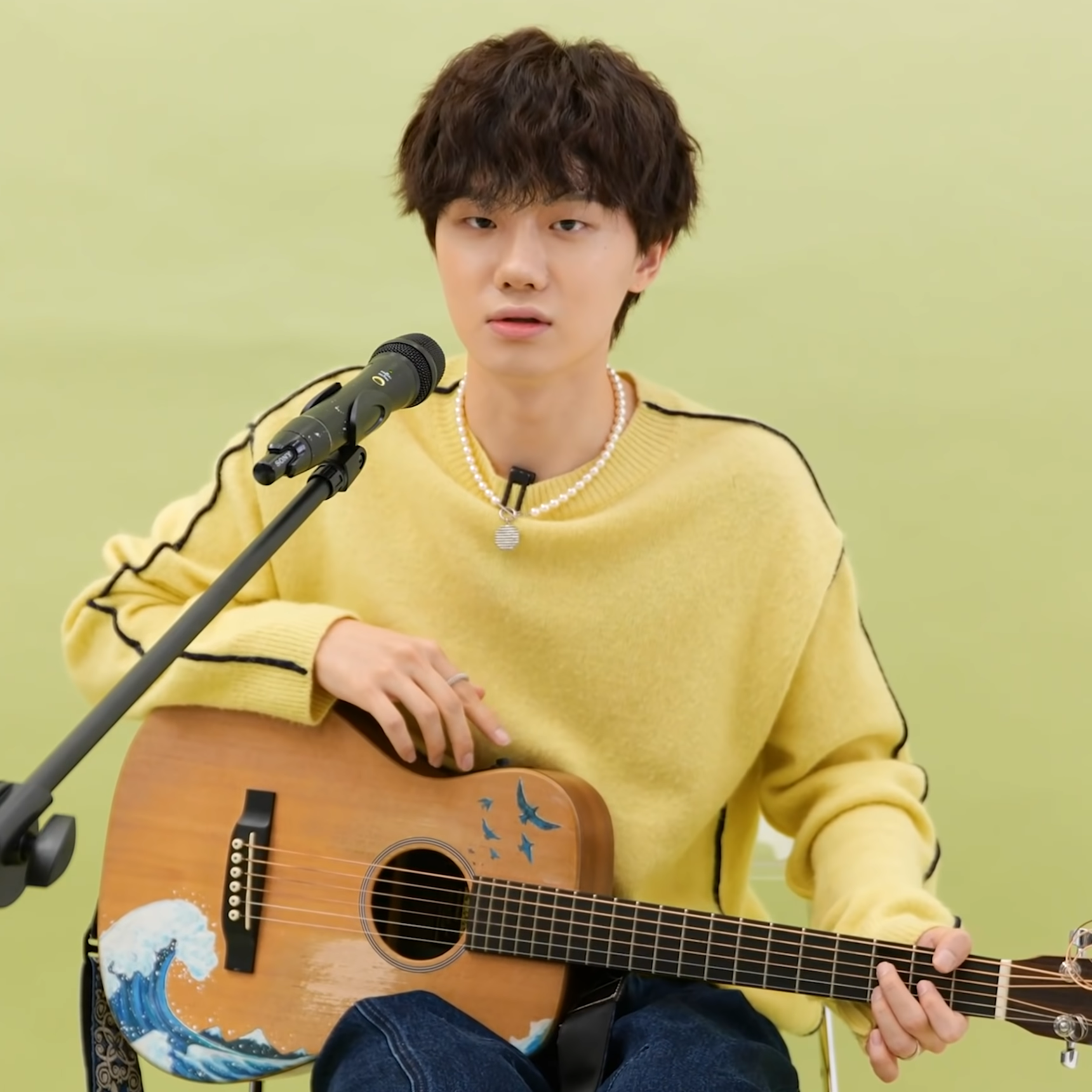
- Ha in 2022
- Born: September 14, 1998 (age 27); Seodaemun District, Seoul, South Korea
- Occupations: Singer; songwriter
- Years active: 2018–present
- Musical career
- Instruments: Vocals; guitar; piano
- Labels: WakeOne; Dreamus & Moss Music (Note: As member of Hoppipolla only.)
- Member of: Hoppipolla; Gomak Boys

Korean name
- Hangul: 하현상
- Hanja: 夏賢尙
- RR: Ha Hyeonsang
- MR: Ha Hyŏnsang
- Website: wake-one.com/en/artists/하현상/

Ha Hyun-sang (Korean: 하현상; born September 14, 1998) is a South Korean singer and songwriter who debuted as a K-Indie artist on February 21, 2018, with a single titled "Dawn". Besides his solo work, he is also the vocalist of Hoppipolla (호피폴라), a band that won a television talent show called Superband (슈퍼밴드) on JTBC in 2019. In 2022, he participated in a music reality show titled Gomak Boys and became their leader during the promotion.

== Early life and education ==
Ha dreamed of becoming a singer while playing in a band in middle school, and after entering Lila Art High School's Department of Practical Music, he began learning how to sing and write songs in earnest. In his high school days, he received the Encouragement Award at the Kim Gwang-seok Song Festival.

He enrolled in the Department of Applied Music at Seoul Institute of the Arts.

== Career ==
=== 2018: Solo debut ===
On February 21, 2018, Ha officially debut with his first single, "Dawn," as a K-Indie artist of Bluewood label.

On May 1, Ha released his first EP My Poor Lonely Heart, which contained 5 tracks including his first single "Dawn" and the new tracks "Where Are You Now", "Gone Tonight," "Koh Samed", and "Break Down" (망가지려나). This EP would later be remastered and released again in 2022 as a limited edition LP.

In August, tvN's drama Mr. Sunshine announced that the drama's seventh OST, Ha's "Becoming the Wind", would be released on domestic South Korean music sites on the 12th. The drama production team of Mr. Sunshine said that they discovered Ha, who was still a 5 month old rookie at that time, while looking for a new voice to add strength to the drama.

=== 2019: Superband & Hoppipolla debut ===
Ha participated in JTBC's Superband where indie musicians were invited to perform and create a band. He participated in the program as a vocalist, but he also performed on the stage with his guitar. In the first round, he formed a team with Shin Ye-chan (Violinist) and Hong Jin-ho (Cellist) and performed "Viva la Vida". During the second round, he joined Jo Won-sang's (Bass Guitarist) team with Lee Gang-ho (Guitarist) and Jeong Sol (Percussionist) and performed "Virtual Insanity". For the third round, he joined I'll's (Vocalist) team with Kim Hyeong-u (Bass Guitarist) and Hong Jin-ho (Cellist) and performed "1000x". In the fourth round, he joined Kim Hyeong-u's (Bass Guitarist) team with the same members from round 3 and performed "Creep".

Before the semi-final round, Ha, along with I'll, Kim Young-so, and Hong Jin-ho, created a band and named it Hoppipolla, which was taken from the Sigur Rós song of the same name. For the first semi-final round, Hoppipolla performed "Hoppipolla" to convey the message of their band name, which was "Hoping people around the world can immerse in their music and feel bliss by getting solace." During the second semi-final round, Hoppipolla performed "Wake Me Up". Hoppipolla got 2nd place with 14,670 points from the semi-finals. In the final round's live broadcast, Hoppipolla performed "One More Light". They won both the online pre-voting and the live text message voting. Hoppipolla also won the final result of the show with 48,339 points. As the winning team, Hoppipolla received prize money worth 100 million won, the opportunity to release an album, hold a world tour, and an SUV.

After winning the Superband, Ha joined promotions with Hoppipolla. They appeared on Immortal Songs 2 for 3 times to perform "Heart Beats (가슴이 뛴다)" by Lee Eun-mi, "Broken Heart (실연)" by Koyote, and "A Million Roses (백만 송이 장미)" on episode 422, 423, and 434, respectively. Hoppipolla signed with Dreamus Company and Moss Music for their band promotions. Hoppipolla officially debuted on November 16 with a single album titled About Time, which consisted of 2 songs: the opening track "Opfern" and the title track "About Time". On December 13, Hoppipolla also performed in the Superband Top 3 Concert with Lucy and Purple Rain.

=== 2020: The Edge & "3108" ===
On May 28, Ha announced that his second EP titled The Edge would be released on June 8. This album consist of 6 tracks, "Intro: Rise", "A Book of Love", "Nostalgia" (feat. Rohann), "Not Okay", "Close", and "With You" (CD only). The name of this album, The Edge, literally means "edge", and captures the growth of Ha as a boy or young man and the ambiguous boundary of him as an artist. Through this work, Ha plans to present a variety of music that he has never tried before. It is especially noteworthy in that he participated in writing lyrics and composing all songs. The title song "Nostalgia" (feat. Rohann) from the album The Edge is an electronic pop song containing memories of the past that Ha worked together with his friend, rapper Rohann. To commemorate his comeback, Ha held an online busking event through his YouTube channel on June 7, the day before the release of his new album, and introduced the new song and showed off his singing.

On October 29, Onefect Entertainment announced Ha's second digital single titled "3108" will be released on November 10. The song name "3108" expresses the speed of light as a formula (3x10^8 km/s), and contains the earnest desire to run faster than light to the past and meet the person you were back then. "3108" is a pop genre song that adds a lyrical melody to EDM sound. The song expresses in heart-rending lyrics the regret of losing love in the past by carelessly not knowing how precious it was and not being able to do your best. As Ha participated in writing, composing, and arranging the lyrics, he shared that he gained inspiration after reading an article saying, "if you run faster than light, you can turn back time". then he asked his brother about the formula for the speed of light and created the song from there. During this comeback, Ha appeared for the first time on KBS 2TV's You Hee-yeol's Sketchbook on November 13 and performed "3108" for the first time. He also appeared on TikTok Music Night at 7 pm on the 15th to meet fans from around the world and deliver healing on a deepening autumn night through a variety of live stages, including his new song "3108".

=== 2021: "Late Night Movie", "Burning Sunset" & Calibrate ===
On February 21, Young K released a cover song of Lauv's "Never Not", filmed with Ha as part of the cover video project 'Young One' through Day6's official YouTube channel. Then on March 29, Stone Music Entertainment announced that Ha's third digital single titled "Late Night Movie" will be released on April 2. "Late Night Movie" is a song that metaphorically expresses the night that we can no longer feel after the reality in which we live suddenly changes. Ha participated in writing and composing the lyrics with Young K as a co-lyricist along with him.

On August 18, he attended the burial ceremony for General Hong Beom-do's remains at the National Cemetery in Daejeon where he sang his OST "Becoming the Wind" from drama Mr. Sunshine in a reverential manner.

On August 23, WakeOne announced Ha's fourth digital single "Burning Sunset" will be released on August 28. Ha revealed a bit of the lyrics through a poster on his social media account also revealed the song credits which he also credited for writing and composing the song. "Burning Sunset" is an alternative rock genre based on electronic sounds where the electric guitar that dominates the introduction and the strong synth sound of the chorus are powerful, and is a song that densely tells a narrative of empathy along with comfort for a moment that will soon disappear. "Burning Sunset" lyrics conveys consolation for the moment that will soon disappear like youth that is not eternal, about the regret of not being able to do what Ha Hyunsang wants in this young moment that will never come again.

On 10 December, it was announced that he would release his third EP titled Calibrate on December 21. The album name Calibrate refers to the name of the button that initializes the settings saved in the instrument. On the 13th, he released a teaser image contains the title song name "Lighthouse". "Lighthouse" is a modern rock song completed with catchy guitar harmonic melodies and Ha Hyun-sang's unique vocals. Ha Hyun-sang also directly participated in writing and composing lyrics for this album, densely depicting his desire to return to the beginning as the meaning of 'Calibrate'. He said that "Lighthouse", which was inspired by inspiration from the sea on a day when the loneliness of thinking that no one could be me, was overwhelming, beautifully depicts the anxious and dangerous emotions of youth. Calibrate have a total of 6 tracks, including "Highway", "Blue Alley", "Dead Bird", "Take Me Away", and "Someone's Letter". They carried out promotions at independent bookstores, including setting up special stands, selling his third EP Calibrate album and giving a set of goods to album buyers from December 23 to 31 resulted the album to sold out.

=== 2022: Living the Moment of Love, Gomak Boys & "When Winter Comes" ===
On May 30, Ha released his fifth digital single, "Living the Moment of Love".

On September 9, Ha participated in a reality music show titled Gomak Boys where the cast members including Paul Kim, Kim Min-seok, Jung Seung-hwan, Big Naughty, were set to form a boy group and promote the released album together. Ha was the leader of the team.

On December 9, WakeOne announced that his sixth digital single, "When Winter Comes", will be released on December 19.

=== 2023: "By My Side", Time and Trace, "Wherever You Are" ===
On March 21, Ha announced that the collaboration digital single with British singer Etham titled "By My Side" will be released on March 28.

On April 12, Ha unveiled a teaser for his first full-length album titled Time and Trace, which will be released on April 27. For celebrating his first full album release, he did a surprise busking at the Dream Forest in North Seoul on May 21.

On October 17, he released the digital single "Wherever You Are" as part of the Two Tracks project.

=== 2024: With All My Heart & Elegy ===
On January 8, Ha released his fourth EP With All My Heart. He participated in all of the music producing of this album.

On October 23, Ha released his new EP titled Elegy, which reflects themes of sorrow and introspection, consistent with the title's connotation. This marks his first musical project following his fourth EP, With All My Heart. The EP showcases Ha's continued growth as an artist and features a collection of emotionally resonant tracks. To further promote Elegy, he is scheduled to hold a series of concerts starting on November 30, 2024.

== Discography ==
=== Studio albums ===
List of studio albums showing select chart positions, and sales
Title	Album details	Peak	Sales
Title	Album details	KOR	Sales
Time and Trace	Released: April 27, 2023; Label: WakeOne; Format: CD, digital download, streaming; Track listing: 1. Melancholy; 2. "You Know" (말야); 3. "Time and Trace" (시간과 흔적); 4. "One Day" (하루가); 5. "The Boy's Chambaer" (소년의 방); 6. "Laputa"; 7. "Darkday" (까만 낮); 8. "Good Night"; 9. "The Way Home" (집에 가는 길); 10. "Same Old Song"; 11. "Wave" (파도)	18	KOR: 19,223
New Boat	Released: April 6, 2026; Label: WakeOne; Format: CD, digital download, streaming	17	KOR: 6,926

=== Extended plays ===
List of extended plays, with selected details, chart positions, and sales
Title	Details	Peak	Sales
Title	Details	KOR	Sales
My Poor Lonely Heart	Released: May 1, 2018; Label: Bluewood Label, Pondsound; Format: streaming; Track listing: 1. "Dawn"; 2. "Where Are You Now"; 3. "Gone Tonight"; 4. "Koh Samed"; 5. "Break Down" (망가지려나)	—	—
The Edge	Released: June 8, 2020; Label: Onefect Entertainment; Format: CD, digital download, streaming; Track listing: 1. Intro : Rise; 2. "Nostalgia" (Feat. Rohann); 3. "A Book of Love"; 4. "Not Okay"; 5. "Close"; 6. "With You" (CD only)	28	KOR: 3,669
Calibrate	Released: December 21, 2021; November 30, 2022 (LP); Label: WakeOne; Format: CD, LP, digital download, streaming; Track listing: 1. 하이웨이; 2. "Lighthouse" (등대); 3. "Blue Alley" (파랑 골목); 4. "Dead Bird" (죽은 새); 5. "Bring Me Back" (데려가 줘); 6. "A Letter from Someone" (어떤 이의 편지)	7	KOR: 13,571
With All My Heart	Released: January 8, 2024; Label: WakeOne; Format: CD, digital download, streaming; Track listing: 1. "Tell Me It Is Love" (사랑이라고 말해줘); 2. "Pain"; 3. "Where Am I" (서로가 없는 곳); 4. "Snowflake" (Korean: 눈)	15	KOR: 11,509
Elegy	Released: October 23, 2024; Label: WakeOne; Format: CD, LP, digital download, streaming; Track listing: 1. "Flight"; 2. "Scent"; 3. "Seasonal Rain"; 4. "On the Quiet"; 5. "Ode"; 6. "Reason"	26	KOR: 10,429
"—" denotes releases that did not chart or were not released in that region.

=== Single albums ===
List of single albums, with selected details
Title	Details
Dawn	Released: February 21, 2018; Label: Bluewood Label, Pondsound; Format: digital download, streaming; Track listing: 1. "Dawn"
Us	Released: November 3, 2019; Label: WakeOne; Format: digital download, streaming; Track listing: 1. "Us"; 2. "Us" (Instrumental)
3108	Released: November 10, 2020; Label: WakeOne; Format: digital download, streaming; Track listing: 1. "3108"; 2. "3108" (Instrumental)
Late Night Movie	Released: April 2, 2021; Label: WakeOne; Format: digital download, streaming; Track listing: 1. "Late Night Movie" (심야영화); 2. "Late Night Movie" (Instrumental)
Burning Sunset	Released: August 28, 2021; Label: WakeOne; Format: digital download, streaming; Track listing: 1. "Burning Sunset" (불꽃놀이); 2. "Burning Sunset" (Instrumental)
Living the Moment of Love	Released: May 30, 2022; Label: WakeOne; Format: digital download, streaming; Track listing: 1. "Magic"; 2. "Night Walk" (밤산책)
When Winter Comes	Released: December 19, 2022; Label:WakeOne; Format: digital download, streaming; Track listing: 1. "When Winter Comes" (겨울이 오면); 2. "When Winter Comes" (Instrumental)
By My Side	Released: March 28, 2023; Label: WakeOne; Format: digital download, streaming; Collaborate with British singer Etham; Track listing: 1. "By My Side"; 2. "By My Side" (Instrumental)
Wherever You Are	Released: October 17, 2023; Label: WakeOne; Format: digital download, streaming; Track listing: 1. "Wherever You Are" (언제나 네가 어디에 있든); 2. "Wherever You Are" (Inst.)

=== Singles ===
==== As lead artist ====
List of singles, with selected chart positions, showing year released and album name
Title	Year	Peak	Album
Title	Year	KOR	Album
"Dawn"	2018	—	Dawn
"Where Are You Now"	2018	—	My Poor Lonely Heart
"Us"	2019	— (Note: "Us" did not chart on the Circle Digital Chart but peaked at number 150 on the BGM Chart.)	Us
"Nostalgia" (feat. Rohann)	2020	—	The Edge
"3108"	2020	—	3108
"Late Night Movie" (심야영화)	2021	— (Note: "Late Night Movie" did not chart on Circle Digital Chart but peaked at number 155 on the Download Chart, and peaked at numbet 156 on the BGM Chart.)	Late Night Movie
"Burning Sunset" (불꽃놀이)	2021	— (Note: "Burning Sunset" did not chart on Circle Digital Chart but peaked at number 135 on the Download Chart, and peaked at number 153 on the BGM Chart.)	Burning Sunset
"Lighthouse" (등대)	2021	— (Note: "Lighthouse" did not chart on Circle Digital Chart but peaked at number 62 on the Download Chart.)	Calibrate
"Magic"	2022	— (Note: "Magic" did not chart on Circle Digital Chart but peaked at number 65 on the Download Chart, and peaked at number 122 on the BGM Chart.)	Living the moment of love
"When Winter Comes" (겨울이 오면)	2023	— (Note: "When Winter Comes" did not chart on Circle Digital Chart but peaked at number 30 on the Download Chart, and peaked at number 63 on the BGM Chart.)	When Winter Comes
"By My Side"	2023	— (Note: "By My Side" did not chart on Circle Digital Chart but peaked at number 66 on the Download Chart, and peaked at number 84 on the BGM Chart.)	By My Side
"Time and Trace" (시간과 흔적)	2023	— (Note: "Time and Trace" did not chart on Circle Digital Chart but peaked at number 69 on the Download Chart, and peaked at number 73 on the BGM Chart.)	Time and Trace
"Wherever You Are" (언제나 네가 어디에 있든)	2023	— (Note: "Wherever You Are" did not chart on Circle Digital Chart but peaked at number 138 on the Download Chart, and peaked at number 24 on the BGM Chart.)	Wherever You Are
"Tell Me It's Love" (사랑이라고 말해줘)	2024	— (Note: "Tell Me It's Love" did not chart on Circle Digital Chart but peaked at number 57 on the Download Chart, and peaked at number 199 on the BGM Chart.)	With All My Heart
"Where am I" (서로가 없는 곳)	2024	— (Note: "Where am I" did not chart on Circle Digital Chart but peaked at number 99 on the Download Chart.)	With All My Heart
"Scent" (향기)	2024	— (Note: "Scent" did not chart on Circle Digital Chart but peaked at number 101 on the Download Chart, and peaked at number 109 on the BGM Chart.)	Elegy
"—" denotes releases that did not chart or were not released in that region.

==== As featured artist ====
List of singles as featured artist, with selected chart positions, showing year released, and album name
Title	Year	Peak	Album
Title	Year	KOR	Album
적 Cloi featuring Ha Hyun-sang	2017	—	Non-album single
"Watercolor" (수채화) Off fearturing Ha Hyun-sang	2020	—	Non-album single
"Someday" (여름날) BOL4 featuring Ha Hyun-sang	2023	84	Non-album single
"Runaway" (털어버리자) YdBB featuring Ha Hyun-sang	2024	— (Note: "Runaway" did not chart on Circle Digital Chart but peaked at number 104 on the Download Chart.)	Non-album single

==== Soundtrack appearances ====
List of soundtrack appearance, with selected chart positions, showing year released and album name
Title	Year	Peak	Album
Title	Year	KOR	Album
"Becoming the Wind" (바람이 되어)	2018	— (Note: "Becomind the Wind" did not chart on Circle Digital Chart but peaked at number 80 on the Download Chart, and peaked at number 4 on the BGM Chart.)	Mr. Sunshine OST Part 7
"Moonlight"	2019	—	Be Melodramatic OST Part 5
"Slowly Fall"	2020	—	A Piece of Your Mind OST Part 1
"Lean On Me" (우리 둘, 서로의 위로가 되어)	2020	— (Note: "Lean On Me" did not chart on Circle Digital Chart but peaked at number 61 on the BGM Chart.)	Soul Mechanic OST Part 2
"Day and Night" (나의 낮 나의 밤)	2021	— (Note: "Day and Night" did not chart on Circle Digital Chart but peaked at number 120 on the Download Chart, and peaked at number 78 on the BGM Chart.)	A Love So Beautiful OST Part 3
"Heal You"	2021	— (Note: "Heal You" did not chart on Circle Digital Chart but peaked at number 180 on the Download Chart, and peaked at number 62 on the BGM Chart.)	Navillera OST Part 4
"Still Wonder"	2021	— (Note: "Still Wonder" did not chart on Circle Digital Chart but peaked at number 90 on the Download Chart, and peaked at number 101 on the BGM Chart.)	You Are My Spring OST Part 3
"With You" (이상하죠)	2021	— (Note: "With You" did not chart on Circle Digital Chart but peaked at number 133 on the Download Chart, and peaked at number 69 on the BGM Chart.)	Dali & Cocky Prince OST Part 4
"Every Moment with You" (YourPlaylist x Ha Hyun-sang) (사랑했던 그 순간)	2021	—	Your Playlist OST
"My Sunlight"	2022	— (Note: "My Sunlight" did not chart on Circle Digital Chart but peaked at number 175 on the Download Chart, and peaked at number 65 on the BGM Chart.)	Rookie Cops OST Part 3
"Be My Birthday"	2022	— (Note: "Be My Birthday" did not chart on Circle Digital Chart but peaked at number 120 on the Download Chart, and peaked at number 88 on the BGM Chart.)	My Liberation Notes OST Part 5
"By Your Side"	2022	— (Note: "By Your Side" did not chart on Circle Digital Chart but peaked at number 168 on the Download Chart, and peaked at number 99 on the BGM Chart.)	Adamas OST Part 4
"Dear You"	2022	— (Note: "Dear You" did not chart on Circle Digital Chart but peaked at number 162 on the Download Chart, and peaked at number 41 on the BGM Chart.)	Mental Coach Jegal OST Part 2
"Alright"	2023	— (Note: "Alright" did not chart on Circle Digital Chart but peaked at number 28 on the Download Chart, and peaked at number 33 on the BGM Chart.)	Crash Course in Romance OST Part 2
"Dream" (드림)	2023	—	Dream OST
"Like You Do to Me" (그대가 나에게 그러하듯)	2023	—	My Perfect Stranger OST Part 3
"Please"	2023	—	Behind Your Touch OST Part 7
"Sailing" (항해)	2024	— (Note: "Sailing" did not chart on Circle Digital Chart but peaked at number 192 on the Download Chart, and peaked at number 69 on the BGM Chart.)	Cinderella at 2 AM OST Part 3
"—" denotes releases that did not chart or were not released in that region.

=== Other charted songs ===
List of other charted songs, with selected chart positions, showing year released and album name
Title	Year	Peak	Album
Title	Year	KOR Down.	Album
"Highway" (하이웨이)	2021	149	Calibrate
"Blue Alley" (파랑 골목)	2021	165	Calibrate
"Bring Me Back" (데려가 줘)	2021	166	Calibrate
"Dead Bird" (죽은 새)	2021	171	Calibrate
"A Letter From Someone" (어떤 이의 편지)	2021	177	Calibrate
"Night Walk" (밤산책)	2022	126	Living the Moment of Love

== Filmography ==
=== Film ===
List of films, showing year aired, film title, and role
Year	Title	Role	Ref.
2022	Life Is Beautiful	Kang Seo-jin	

=== Television show ===
List of web shows, showing year aired, show title, role, and notes
Year	Title	Role	Notes	Ref.
2019	Superband	Contestant	became the winner with Hoppipolla	

=== Web show ===
List of TV shows, showing year aired, show title, role, and notes
Year	Title	Role	Notes	Ref.
2022	Gomak Boys	Cast member	Leader of Gomak Boys	

== Concerts ==
- 2019 HA HYUN SANG 1ST FAN MEETING [THE FIRST] (2019.11.02.)
- 문화콘서트 난장 in 나주정미소 난장곡간 (2020.12.03.)
- 2021 Soundberry Theater #2 (2021.09.24.~2021.09.25.)
- 2021 SOMEDAY THEATRE CANTABILE - 부산 (2021.10.24.)
- 2021 SOMEDAY THEATRE LAST CANTABILE (2021.10.30.~2021.11.06.)
- 2021 Soundberry Theater #3 (2021.11.14.)
- 어썸 뮤직 페스티벌 시즌 3 (2021.12.18.~2021.12.19.)
- 2022 이달의 어썸 (2022.01.23.)
- 2022 이달의 어썸 시즌2 (2022.02.19.)
- 2022 Soundberry Theater #1 (2022.03.19.~2022.03.20.)
- 〈원픽스테이지〉 10CM 하현상 소수빈 - 광주 (2022.04.30.)
- PEAK FESTIVAL 2022 (2022.05.28.)
- 2022 서울 파크 뮤직 페스티벌 (2022.06.25.~2022.06.26.)
- 2023 Ha Hyun Sang 1st Concert Tour Time and Trace (2023.08.05 – 2023.09.02)
- 2023 HA HYUN SANG – 1st Mini Live & Fan Meeting in Taipei (2023.11.24)
- 2024 Ha Hyun Sang Concert With All My Heart (2024.01.13~2024.01.14)
