= Chae Bo-hun =

South Korean singer-songwriter

Chae Bo-hun 채보훈
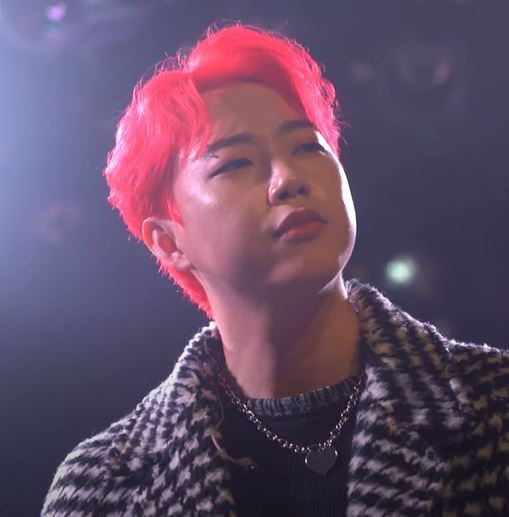

Background information
- Also known as: The VANE (더베인)
- Born: August 23, 1992 (age 33); Daegu
- Genres: alternative rock
- Occupation: singer-songwriter
- Instrument: guitar
- Years active: 2015–present
- Formerly of: Purple Rain
- Website: www.facebook.com/thevane053

Chae Bo-hun (born 23 August, 1992) is a South Korean singer-songwriter, also known as The VANE. He is the vocalist of rock band Purple Rain, which finished third at JTBC's televised talent show Superband. He regularly contributes to Korean drama soundtracks, as well.

== Life and career ==
Chae Bo-hun was born in Daegu, has one older brother. In 2012, he placed first at the Busan MBC University Song Festival with his composition All in Love, and placed second with a composition called Neoreul cheoum bon sungan nan banhaesseo (너를 처음 본 순간 난 반했어). In 2015, he created a one-man band called The VANE. In 2016 and 2017 he participated in the MBC program Duet Song Festival, where he performed together with the lead singer of Jaurim, Kim Yoon-ah. They won five times. In 2019, he participated in JTBC's talent show, Superband, where he was placed third as part of a group named Purple Rain. The band signed with JTBC Studio after the show and released their own music.

He has recorded songs for several South Korean television dramas, including Save Me, Two Cops, Vagabond, Hell Is Other People and Itaewon Class.

== Discography ==
=== The VANE ===
Singles

- 2015: Beck
- 2015: Moon Like The Star
- 2017: Alone
- 2017: Grow
- 2018: Mask

EPs

- 2016: Line
- 2019: Run

Studio albums

- 2017: Round

=== Soundtracks ===
- 2017: "Hwangak" (환각) (Save Me OST)
- 2017: "Dreamer" (Two Cops OST)
- 2018: "Changer" (Player OST)
- 2019: "Teoneol" (터널) (Item OST)
- 2019: "Nightmare" (Love in Sadness OST)
- 2019: "Savior" (Save Me 2 OST)
- 2019: "Room No. 303" (Hell Is Other People OST)
- 2019: "Open Fire" (Vagabond OST)
- 2019: "Bird" (My Country: The New Age OST, with Purple Rain)
- 2020: "No Break" (직진) (Itaewon Class OST)
- 2020: "Superhero" (Sweet Munchies OST)
- 2022: "You've Got Me Wrong" (Insider OST)
- 2024: "Breaking Rocks" (Branding in Seongsu OST)
- 2024: "She's Back" (Miss Night And Day OST)
