= Bandage (band) =

South Korean band

- Origin: South Korea
- Genres: British Rock; Alternative Rock; Pop Metal; Modern Rock
- Years active: 2020–2023
- Label: IST
- Members: Lee Chan-sol; Shin Hyun-bin
- Past members: Kang Kyoung-yoon; Lim Hyeong-bin
- Website: http://www.planaent.co.kr/bandage

Bandage (Korean: 밴디지) is a South Korean rock band under the label IST Entertainment (formerly Play M Entertainment). The band currently consists of two members: Lee Chan-sol and Shin Hyun-bin. All members are contestants in JTBC's music survival show SuperBand in 2019. Their band name, as a combination of "band" and "windage", expresses the attitude of "growing up to be an influential rock band that brings fresh wind". Originally as four, the band debuted on April 3, 2020, with the digital single album Square One and the title track "Invisibles".

On April 4, 2022, it was announced that Lim Hyeong-bin has left the group due to musical differences. On January 6, 2023, IST Entertainment announced their departure from the agency after terminating their contracts. On January 28, 2023, Kang Kyoung-yoon announced on his Instagram his departure from the group.

== Members ==
- Lee Chan-sol (이찬솔) - Vocal, guitar
- Shin Hyun-bin (신현빈) - Guitar, sub-vocal

=== Past members ===
- Kang Kyoung-yoon (강경윤) - Drum
- Lim Hyeong-bin (임형빈) - Bass, sub-vocal, keyboard, guitar

== Discography ==
=== Studio albums ===
| Title | Album details | Peak chart positions |
| Title | Album details | KOR |
|---|---|---|
| 432 | Released: June 19, 2020; Label: Play M Entertainment, Kakao M; Formats: CD, digital download; Track listing: 1. Intro; 2. To The Light (빛으로); 3. Coloring The Life; 4. True Love Waits; 5. Bam (퍽); 6. Time To Love You; 7. Into the fire (불길 속으로); 8. Heaven (자리) (CD Only); 9. Invisibles (유령) (CD Only); 10. For You From Me (나로부터 너를 위해) (CD Only) | 59 |

=== Single albums ===
| Title | Album details | Peak chart positions |
| Title | Album details | KOR |
|---|---|---|
| Square One | Released: April 3, 2020; Label: Play M Entertainment, Kakao M; Format: Digital download; Track listing: 1. Heaven (자리); 2. Invisibles (유령); 3. For You From Me (나로부터 너를 위해) | —N/a |
| Youth21 | Released: October 7, 2021; Label: Play M Entertainment, Kakao Entertainment; Format: Digital download; Track listing: 1. Youth21 | —N/a |
| Remember | Released: June 29, 2022; Label: IST Entertainment, Kakao Entertainment; Format: Digital download; Track listing: 1. Remember (하늘품) | —N/a |

== Television appearances ==
| Date | Channel | Show title |
|---|---|---|
| April 23, 2020 | Mnet | M Countdown |
| May 14, 2020 | KBS1 | All That Music |
| May 31, 2020 | KBS1 | Open Concert |
| October 23, 2020 | JTBC | Hidden Singer Season 6 |
| December 25, 2020 | KBS1 | Sing Street |
