= Hoppipolla (band) =

South Korean band

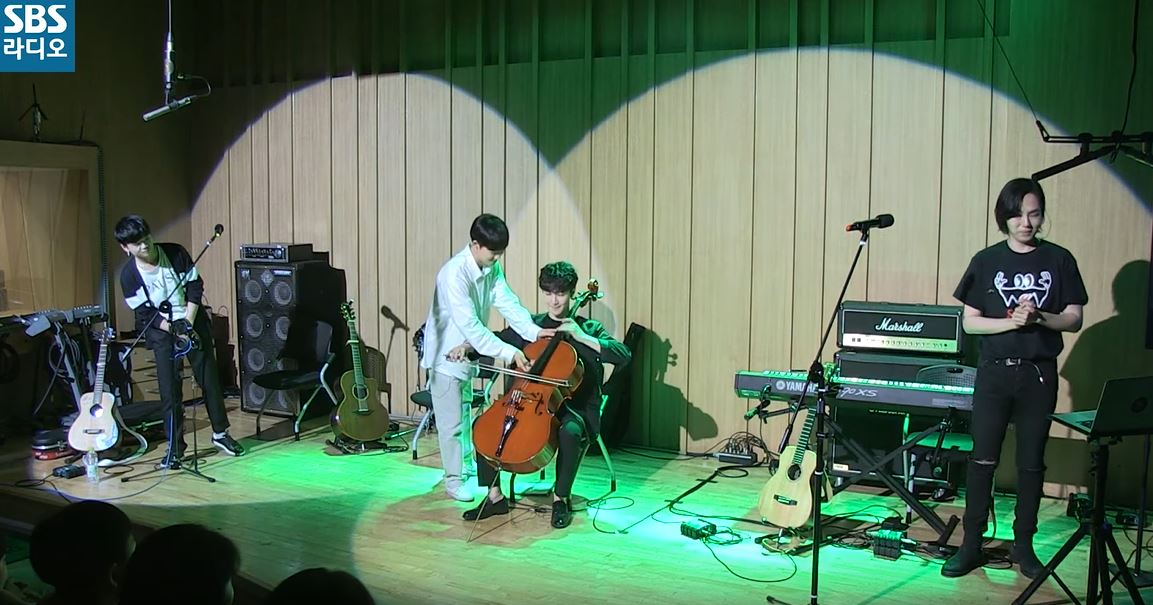
- Hoppipolla on SBS Radio in 2019

Background information
- Origin: South Korea
- Genres: Rock; Ballad
- Years active: 2019–2021
- Labels: Moss Music; Dreamus
- Members: I'll; Hong Jin-ho; Ha Hyun-sang; Kim Young-so

Hoppipolla (Korean: 호피폴라) was a South Korean band formed in JTBC survival show Superband in 2019 and the winner of the show. Their band name, which was taken from the Sigur Rós song of the same name means "jumping into puddles" in Icelandic, is about "Hoping people around the world can immerse in their music and feel bliss by getting solace". The band consisted of two vocalists, a cellist and a guitarist: I'll, Ha Hyun-sang, Hong Jin-ho and Kim Young-so, respectively. They made their debut on November 16, 2019, with the single album About Time.

== Members ==
- I'll (아일) - Vocalist, keyboard
- Hong Jin-ho (홍진호) - Cellist
- Ha Hyun-sang (하현상) - Vocalist, guitar
- Kim Young-so (김영소) - Guitarist

== Discography ==
=== Extended plays ===
| Title | Album details | Peak chart positions | Sales |
| Title | Album details | KOR | Sales |
|---|---|---|---|
| Spring to Spring | Released: April 22, 2020; Label: Moss Music, Dreamus; Format: CD, digital download | 21 | KOR: 2,543 |
| And Then There Was Us | Released: January 20, 2021; Label: Moss Music, Dreamus; Format: CD, digital download | 24 | KOR: 4,559 |

=== Single albums ===
| Title | Album details | Peak chart positions | Sales |
| Title | Album details | KOR | Sales |
|---|---|---|---|
| About Time | Released: November 16, 2019; Label: Dreamus; Format: Digital download | — | —N/a |
| Let's! | Released: August 20, 2020; Label: Moss Music, Dreamus; Format: Digital download | — | —N/a |
