= Gomak Boys =

South Korean reality television program

- Promotional poster
- 고막소년단
- Genre: Reality; Variety
- Written by: Moon Eun-sil; Kim Soo-bin; Noh Yeong-seo; Ahn Ga-ram
- Directed by: Park Hye-jin; Joo Hyeon-min; Choi Yo-seon; Im Ye-seon
- Starring: Paul Kim; Kim Min-seok; Jung Seung-hwan; Ha Hyun-sang; Big Naughty
- Original language: Korean
- No. of episodes: 12

Production
- Production company: Kakao Entertainment

Original release
- Network: Kakao TV, 1TheK, Melon
- Release: September 8 – November 25, 2022

Gomak Boys (Korean: 고막소년단; RR: Gomaksonyeondan) is a South Korean reality show that aired every Thursday on Kakao TV from September 8 to November 25, 2022. The show invited 5 male singers Paul Kim, Kim Min-seok, Jung Seung-hwan, Ha Hyun-sang, and Big Naughty to form a K-Pop boygroup. The cast members formed a special boy group with the same name and released two digital single "You and Me" (사이) and "Sweet Thing" (단거) on November 22, 2022.

== Name ==
The group name "Gomak Boys" adapted from the Korean literal meaning for Ear Drum Boys. The name also represents the will to melt the listeners' ears with their singing voices.

== History ==
=== September 2–5, 2022 Fandom Name Contest ===
The Gomak Boys fandom name contest event began on the 2nd through the music site Melon, and in just 3 days, over 1,000 comments were made, and a large number of fandom names with ingenious ideas appeared. Later, the fandom name will be discussed together with the members on the launching live.

=== First Meeting ===
Kakao Entertainment posted an unreleased video showing the secret company dinner party of the Gomak Boyfriends. The company dinner live is held with Gomak Boys singing their favorite songs to the impromptu guitar performance of Ha Hyun-sang. The one who start this was Big Naughty. He reinterpreted the beloved song "Seoul Night", which was released in 2005. Paul Kim performed Sung Si-kyung's "Two People" and Kim Min-seok performed the pop song "Heather". In particular, in the video, the members who were able to see each other's passionate singing right in front of them were also shown admiring and cheering as they were immersed in each other's songs and voices.

=== September 8, 2022 Launching Live ===
The five-member boy group Gomak Boys from reality show with the same name (directed by Park Hye-jin) was unveiled for the first time at 5 PM KST on Thursday, September 8 through a launching live. Previously, Kakao Entertainment only released a silhouette poster of the five members in neat uniforms striking chic poses under colorful lighting.

In the launching live, they promised to release an uncensored version of the reality video if the cumulative number of views exceeded 5 million, and to run a daily cafe with the uniform styling that fans desired if it exceeded 10 million views.

- On October 5, an unreleased video was uploaded to commemorate exceeding 5 million views.
- On October 11, although the number of views had not yet exceeded 10 million, a notice was posted that a uniform daily cafe would be opened in advance on the 13th, and on the 13th, the uniform daily cafe was operated.

=== August 31, 2022 Hongdae Busking ===
Gomak Boys appeared in front of the public for the first time through busking on August 31. In particular, through a joint stage with 5 people, they perfectly sang K-pop classics such as BTS's "Spring Day" and g.o.d's "Candlelight One" in their own unique atmosphere. In addition, Paul Kim and Jung Seung-hwan performed Ive's "Love Dive" live as a surprise duet and also captured attention with their cute dance. Accordingly, Kim Min-seok, Ha Hyun-sang, and Big Naughty also led a positive response by performing NewJeans' "Hype Boy" as a three-member unit. For the individual performances, Paul Kim sang "I Want a Cup of Coffee". Kim Min-seok sang "Gift". Jung Seung-hwan sang "If It Was You". Ha Hyun-sang sang "Burning Sunset", which he personally participated in writing and composing, while playing the guitar. Big Naughty sang "Let's Call It Love".

=== November 22, 2022 Debut Showcase ===
Gomak Boys held a debut showcase at the KBS Arena in Gangseo District, Seoul at 2 PM KST on November 22 and released new songs. Their first title track, "You and Me" (사이; Sai; 'Between'), is a song that contains comprehensive meaning about relationships that cannot be defined as one, such as between us, between you and me, between all of us, between us and our fans, etc. The lyrics express the belief and hope that people who have taken different paths will finally come together and continue without a period. Meanwhile, the second title track "Sweet Things" (Korean: 단거; RR: Dangeo) is a song that conveys the identity of Gomak Boys which is the "K-gomak boyfriend boy group". It is a song that is full of a lovely atmosphere and is good to listen to comfortably.

=== November 26, 2022 Melon Music Awards ===
Gomak Boys begun their activities in earnest by appearing at the 2022 Melon Music Awards, which held at Gocheok Sky Dome in Seoul on November 26.

== Cast ==
- Paul Kim (폴킴)
- Kim Min-seok (김민석)
- Jung Seung-hwan (정승환)
- Ha Hyun-sang (하현상) - Leader
- Big Naughty (빅나티)

== Episodes ==
No.	Title	Original release date
0	"🧚🏻‍♂️All About Gomak Boys in Launching Live🥰"; Transliteration: "🧚🏻‍♂️All About Gomakseonyeondan in Ronching Raibe🥰" (Korean: 🧚🏻‍♂️All About 고막소년단 in 론칭 라이브🥰)	September 8, 2022
Gomak Boys launching live broadcast where the cast members introduce themselves and the team, choose their fan name, team leader, and team greetings, also talk about the show behind the scene. Ha Hyun-sang was selected as the team leader and "녹겠단; Nokgetdan" was selected as the fan name. For the team greeting they chose to chant "Melting Your Ears!" followed by their team name.
1	"🌀Joined Kakao Entertainment(❓)One Gomak Boys🌀"; Transliteration: "🌀Kakao Enteo-e Ibsa(❓)Han Gomakseonyendan🌀" (Korean: 🌀카카오 엔터에 입사(❓)한 고막소년단🌀)	September 15, 2022
The cast members pre-meeting where each of them selected their favorite member before they met each other and share their thoughts about what things that Gomak Boys should prioritize. They also share their music taste and preference at the end of the episode.
2	"🧑🏻‍✈Gomak uniform group 🆚 Gomak refresh group🐳" Transliteration: "🧑🏻‍✈Gomakjebokdan🆚 Gomakcheongryangdan🐳" (Korean: 🧑🏻‍✈고막제복단 🆚 고막청량단🐳)	September 22, 2022
The cast member play song guessing game then sing it in karaoke version after guessed it. Jung Seung-hwan sang "Thorn" by Buzz, Kim Min-seok sang "Timeless" by SG Wannabe, Jung Seung-hwan and Kim Min-seok sang "That Man, That Woman" by Vibe together, then all cast members sang "Gift" by MeloMance together. In the middle of the episode, they prepare to shoot a profile picture for Gomak Boys official profile.
3	"어서와🤗 고막소년단 합숙🏡은 처음이지❔"; Transliteration: "Eoseowa🤗 Gomaksenyeondan Habsuk🏡eun Cheoeum-iji❔" (Korean: 어서와🤗 고막소년단 합숙🏡은 처음이지❔)	September 29, 2022
The cast member prepared to move to Gomak Boys dormitory. In the dorm their phone was confiscated. They chose their room and bed then prepared for dinner because they need to cook meat. After dinner, they deepened their relationship by playing some vocal games together and have a deep talk about each other. In the next morning, Ha Hyun-sang woke the cast members up as leader then they play cohesion test while having breakfast.
4	"Everyone who couldn't go busking gather together!" Transliteration: "Beoseuking Mot Gatdeon Nokgetdan Moyeo!" (Korean: 버스킹 못 갔던 녹겠단 다 모여!)	October 6, 2022
Gomak Boys busking in Hongdae, the cast members split into 2 teams to do it in the different spot. Team Ha Hyun-sang, Kim Min-seok, and Big Naughty sang "Hype Boy" by NewJeans, "Gift" by MeloMance, "Burning Sunset" by Ha Hyun-sang, and "Beyond Love" by Big Naughty. Meanwhile team Paul Kim and Jung Seung-hwan sang a logo song called "Confession Song" (있잖아), "Would You Like Some Coffee?" by Paul Kim, "If It Was You" by Jung Seung-hwan, and "Love Dive" by Ive.
5	"Gomak Boys🌟Full Member🌟 Busking Big Reveal💗"; Transliteration: "Gomakseonyeondan🌟Wanjeonche🌟 Beoseuking Daegonggae💗" (Korean: 고막소년단 🌟완전체🌟 버스킹 大공개💗)	October 13, 2022
6	"Ha Leader👨🏻‍✈'s Gomak Boys Support DAY🥳"; Transliteration: "Ha Rideo👨🏻‍✈eui Gomakseonyeondan Dwitbaraji DAY🥳" (Korean: 하리더👨🏻‍✈의 고막소년단 뒷바라지 DAY🥳)	October 20, 2022
7	"Gomak Young Masters' Chaotic🥴 Hanok Experience💫"; Transliteration: "Gomakdoryeongdan-eui Udangtangtang🥴 Hanok Cheheobgi💫" (Korean: 고막도령단의 우당탕탕🥴 한옥 체험기💫)	October 27, 2022
8	"Sky☀And Wind💨And Music🎵And Gomak Young Masters🪁"; Transliteration: "Haneul☀gwa Baram💨gwa Eumak🎵gwa Gomakdoryeongdan🪁" (Korean: 하늘☀과 바람💨과 음악🎵과 고막도령단🪁)	November 8, 2022
9	"Do You want Gomak uniform group and a glass of Coffee~♬"; Transliteration: "Gomakjebokdan-gwa Keopi-hanjan-hallaeyo~♬" (Korean: 고막제복단과 커피한잔할래요~♬)	November 10, 2022
10	"✨The Main Job Voice Genius and so Handsome✨ Gomak Boys Song Recording!"; Transliteration: "✨Beoneob Cheonjae Moksori Jonjal✨ Gomakseonyeondan Eumak Nogeum!" (Korean: ✨본업 천재 목소리 존잘✨ 고막소년단 음원 녹음!)	November 17, 2022
11	"🔥Boygroup <Gomak Boys> Debut Showcase Melting Day🔥"; Transliteration: "🔥Boigeurub <Gomakseonyeondan> Debwi Syokeiseu Melting Day🔥" (Korean: 🔥보이그룹 <고막소년단> 데뷔 쇼케이스 Melting Day🔥)	November 22, 2022

== Discography ==
=== Single Albums ===
List of extended plays, with selected details, chart positions, sales and certifications
Title	Details
Gomak Boys	Released: 22 November 2022; Label: Kakao Entertainment; Format: Download, streaming; Track listing: 1. You and Me; 2. Sweet Thing

=== Songs ===
List of singles, with showing year released and album name
Title	Year	Peak	Album
Title	Year	KOR DL	Album
"You and Me" (사이)	2022	20	Gomak Boys
"Sweet Thing" (단거)	2022	17	Gomak Boys

== Videography ==
=== Music videos ===
List of music videos, showing year released, album name, artist, and MV director
Year	Title	Director	Length	Ref.
2022	"Sweet Things"	Park Hye-jin	4:08	
2022	"You and Me"	Park Hye-jin	4:45	
