= Strangers from Hell =

2019 South Korean television series

- Promotional poster
- Also known as: Hell Is Other People
- Hangul: 타인은 지옥이다
- RR: Taineun jiogida
- MR: T'ainŭn chiogida
- Genre: Psychological thriller
- Based on: Hell Is Other People by Kim Yong-ki
- Developed by: OCN
- Written by: Jung Yi-do
- Directed by: Lee Chang-hee
- Starring: Im Si-wan; Lee Dong-wook
- Country of origin: South Korea
- Original language: Korean
- No. of episodes: 10

Production
- Producers: Kim Woo-sang; Kwon Mi-kyung
- Running time: 60 minutes
- Production companies: Woo Sang Film; Studio N

Original release
- Network: OCN
- Release: August 31 – October 6, 2019

Strangers from Hell, also known as Hell Is Other People, (Note: Korean: 타인은 지옥이다) is a 2019 South Korean television series starring Yim Si-wan and Lee Dong-wook. Based on the Naver Webtoon Hell Is Other People by Kim Yong-ki, it is the second series of OCN's "Dramatic Cinema" project which combines film and drama formats. It aired from August 31 to October 6, 2019.

== Synopsis ==
It tells the story of a young man in his 20s who moves to Seoul after landing an internship in a company. While looking for a place to stay, Yoon Jong-woo stumbles upon Eden Studio, an ominous cheap dormitory and decides to stay there as he is low on money. Though not thrilled about the quality of the place and its abnormal residents, including his next-door neighbor Seo Moon-jo, he decides to tolerate it until he saves enough money to move out. However, mysterious occurrences start occurring in the studio, causing Jong-woo to start fearing the studio's residents.

== Cast ==
=== Main ===
- Yim Si-wan as Yoon Jong-woo

A writer who comes from countryside and moves in room 303 at Eden Dormitory after landing a new job at a new company his older friend created. He takes Eden Dormitory for a cheap price, only to find out that the dormitory is not just an ordinary dormitory.

- Lee Dong-wook as Seo Moon-jo

A dentist who works near Eden Dormitory and lives in room 304. He comes across as a friendly and compassionate dentist. However, things are not what they seem.

=== Supporting ===
Yoon Jong-woo's colleagues

- Cha Rae-hyung as Shin Jae-ho

Jong-woo's university senior and now boss.

- Kim Han-jong as Park Byeong-min

Jong-woo's chief at the company.

- Oh Hye-won as Son Yoo-jeong

Jong-woo's only female colleague.

- Park Ji-han as Go Sang-man

The head of section at Jong-woo's company.

People at Eden Dormitory

- Lee Jung-eun as Eom Bok-soon

The owner of Eden Dormitory. She seems friendly but she hides a very dark secret.

- Lee Hyun-wook as Yoo Gi-hyeok

A mysterious and cold resident who lives in room 302.

- Park Jong-hwan as Byeon Deuk-jong and Byeon Deuk-soo

Twin brothers who lives in rooms 306 and 307 respectively. Deuk-jong is mentally handicapped, while Deuk-soo has better intelligence than his twin brother.

- Lee Joong-ok as Hong Nam-bok

A resident who lives in room 313. He is a porn-addict.

- Hyun Bong-sik as Ahn Hee-joong

A thug resident who lives in room 310. He was planning to leave the dormitory and start a new and better life.

Others

- Ahn Eun-jin as So Jung-hwa

A policewoman with a degree in Engineering.

- Yoon Sung-won as chief of patrol division.
- Kim Ji-eun as Min Ji-eun

An office worker and Jong-woo's girlfriend.

- Song Wook-kyung as Cha Sung-ryeol

A detective who often works with gangsters.

- Lee Suk as Joo Yoo-cheol

A reporter who works for a daily newspaper.

- Ha Seon-haeng as So Jae-heon

A former detective and Jung-hwa's father.

- Son Young-soon as So Jung-hwa's grandmother.
- Noh Jong-hyun as Kang Seok-yoon

A new resident at Eden Dormitory.

- Song Yoo-hyun as Han Go-eun

Ji-eun's boss.

- Anupam Tripathi as Kumail

=== Special appearances ===
- Lim Soo-hyung as a taxi driver.
- Park Seung-tae as a flower seller.
- Nam Jung-hee as a murder victim.
- Kim Yannie as Kumail's wife.
- Park cheon-guk as a bully.

== Production ==
First script reading took place in April 2019, in Sangam-dong, Seoul.

== Original soundtrack ==
Hell Is Other People OST

Soundtrack album by Various artists
- Released: 2019
- Genre: Soundtrack
- Languages: Korean; English
- Label: Music&NEW

=== Part 1 ===
Released on August 31, 2019
No.	Title	Lyrics	Music	Artist	Length
1.	"Strangers" (타인은 지옥이다)	Kim Ho-kyung	1601	The Rose	3:28
2.	"Strangers" (Inst.)		1601		3:28
Total length:					6:56

=== Part 2 ===
Released on September 7, 2019
No.	Title	Lyrics	Music	Artist	Length
1.	"Room No. 303"	Taibian	Taibian; Baaq	The Vane	3:27
2.	"Room No. 303" (Inst.)		Taibian; Baaq		3:27
Total length:					6:54

=== Part 3 ===
Released on September 21, 2019
No.	Title	Lyrics	Music	Artist	Length
1.	"Blow Off"	Yoari	Space One; Yoari	Yoari	3:27
2.	"Blow Off" (Inst.)		Space One; Yoari		3:27
Total length:					6:54

=== Part 4 ===
Released on September 28, 2019
No.	Title	Lyrics	Music	Artist	Length
1.	"Ruin"	Kim Ho-kyung	1601	Hong Isaac	3:45
2.	"Ruin" (Inst.)		1601		3:45
Total length:					7:30

== Viewership ==
Strangers from Hell : South Korea viewers per episode (thousands)

Season	Episode number										Average
Season	1	2	3	4	5	6	7	8	9	10	Average
1	1053	938	768	825	551	815	529	674	610	954	772

Source: Audience measurement performed nationwide by Nielsen Media Research.

Average TV viewership ratings
Ep.	Original broadcast date	Title	Average audience share (Nielsen Korea)	
Ep.	Original broadcast date	Title	Nationwide	Seoul
1	August 31, 2019	Hell Is Other People (타인은 지옥이다)	3.763% (3rd)	4.645% (3rd)
2	September 1, 2019	Human Nature (인간 본능)	3.538% (2nd)	4.168% (2nd)
3	September 7, 2019	The Secret Whisper (은밀한 속삭임)	3.191% (3rd)	4.158% (3rd)
4	September 8, 2019	Mental Derangement (정신 착란)	3.082% (2nd)	3.501% (2nd)
5	September 21, 2019 (Note: Episode 5 was delayed because of Chuseok festival.)	Malte's Notebook (Note: Episode title is a reference to Rainer Maria Rilke's The Notebooks of Malte Laurids Brigge.) (말테의 수기)	2.2%	2.436% (6th)
6	September 22, 2019	Lost (로스트)	3.400% (2nd)	3.790% (2nd)
7	September 28, 2019	The Horror of the Basement (지하실의 공포)	1.964% (5th)	2.410% (4th)
8	September 29, 2019	Voices that Choke Me (옥죄는 목소리들)	2.651% (2nd)	2.801% (4th)
9	October 5, 2019	Cognitive Dissonance (인지 부조화)	2.355% (5th)	2.603% (5th)
10	October 6, 2019	Gas-lighting (가스라이팅)	3.908% (1st)	4.509% (1st)
Average			3.005%	3.502%
In the table above, the blue numbers represent the lowest ratings and the red numbers represent the highest ratings.; This drama aired on a cable channel/pay TV which normally has a relatively smaller audience compared to free-to-air TV/public broadcasters (KBS, SBS, MBC and EBS).

== Awards and nominations ==
Name of the award ceremony, year presented, category, nominee of the award, and the result of the nomination
Organization	Year	Category	Recipient	Result	Ref.
Cable TV Broadcasting Awards	2020	Grand Prize (Daesang)	Strangers from Hell	Won	
