= Isaac Hong =

South Korean musician (born 1988)

- 홍이삭
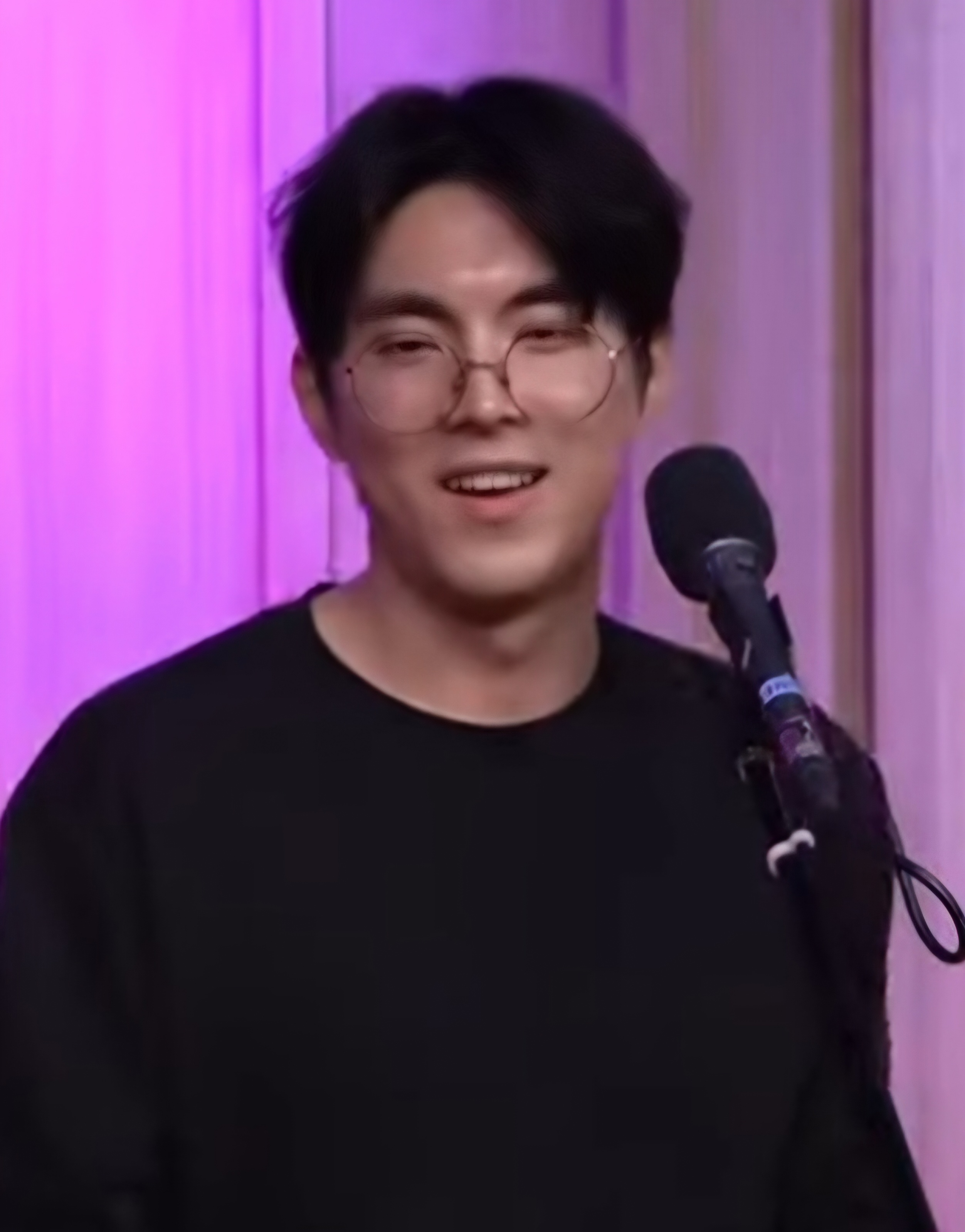
- Hong in 2023
- Born: 12 May 1988 (age 38); South Korea
- Education: Handong Global University; Berklee College of Music
- Occupations: Singer; Songwriter; Producer
- Years active: 2013–present
- Style: Vocals; Keyboard; Guitar; Ballad; Indie Pop; Folk; Rock
- Awards: #Awards

Signature
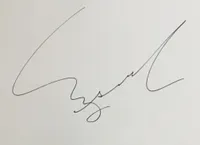

Isaac Hong (Korean: 홍이삭; born 12 May 1988) is a South Korean singer-songwriter. He is best known for singing South Korean drama soundtracks, including "Fallin'" from Queen of Tears. Prior to that, Hong also won the third season of JTBC program Sing Again and appeared in the first season of Superband.

== Early life and education ==
Hong was born on 12 May 1988. Both of his parents are Protestant missionaries, which led to him learning English while attending an international elementary school in Papua New Guinea for three and a half years. This period of Hong's life had an impact on the music he later produced: "Learning music at church from a young age has had a significant influence... This was during my time in Papua New Guinea".

Hong attended Isabel Middle School in Busan, and went to Handong International School in Pohang for high school. In 2007, Hong entered Handong Global University to study Journalism and Information studies. He was a member of the university's song writing club, NEO. In 2009, he dropped out of Handong Global University and chose to attend Berklee College of Music, majoring in Music Education. He attended the university for three semesters starting in 2010, before taking a leave of absence due to "large enrolment fees and the burden of malocclusion surgery".

== Career ==
=== 2013–2018: career beginnings ===
Hong made his broadcast debut in 2013 by winning a bronze medal with his self-composed song "봄아" (English Translation: Spring) at the 24th Yoo Jae-ha Music Contest (제24회 유재하 음악경연대회).

In 2014, following his participation in the 24th Yoo Jae-ha Music Contest, Hong featured on the album released in celebration of the contest and joined various concerts promoting the album. The release of this album marked Hong's official debut in the music industry, as his song was published under the label Music&New as part of the commemorative album. Hong also participated in writing, composing, and arranging the album's group song, "One Step Behind" (한걸음 뒤에 서면 보이는 것들; lit. 'Things you can see when you stand one step behind'). In 2015, Hong released his first 24-minute extended play titled As Time Passes By with the same title track. The release of this EP marks Hong's solo debut as a musician; it is the first musical work published solely under his name.

In 2016, Hong appeared on Mnet show I Can See Your Voice season 2. He featured in the season's 12th episode, which aired on January 7, as a "good" singer. He made an appearance during the Evidence round, and was nicknamed "Primitive Soul from the Jungle". Following his appearance on I Can See Your Voice, Hong joined the Republic of Korea Armed Forces to fulfil his mandated service between 25 January 2016 and 26 October 2017 as an Army Sergeant. On 1 April 2018, Hong started a YouTube channel called 차곡차곡 (lit. 'Step by Step') where he broadcast himself writing and composing songs in real time.

=== 2019–2023: JTBC's Superband, budding popularity ===
Beginning in April 2019, Hong "garnered popularity after participating in the first season of Superband (TV program) on JTBC. Hong first appearance on the show is in Episode 2, during the audition round. Hong performed his original song "Spring", while singing and playing acoustic guitar. From episodes 3 until 9, Hong joined and created various bands, winning two out of three rounds. In Episode 10, Hong placed seventh out of nine teams, with his team's highest judge score being 90 and lowest being 78. Hong joined his final team, Moné, making it to the show's finals. Moné finished the show in fourth place.

The same year, Hong released the singles "You Liked Me in My Dreams" and "Campfire", as well as the song "Ruin", which was released on the Original Sound Track for the Korean television show Strangers from Hell). Hong made his first appearance on Dreaming Radio, a radio program broadcast on MBC FM4U and hosted by the Korean music producer Park Kyung. Throughout 2019, he maintained a regular presence on the show, appearing 11 times that year. On the 6 December 2019, Hong released an EP titled The Important Little Things. The EP is 15 minutes long and comprises four songs. On the 31 December, Hong did his first interview (with Studio Flo).

In 2020, Hong released the single "Without You" and featured on the soundtrack of The Uncanny Counter with the song "Close Your Eyes". He made his acting debut as a guest actor in Lee Ji-Hyung's musical play The Home and also appeared on JTBC's show Hidden Singer 6 Episode 12 as a member of the show's celebrity panel. Hong also participated in the making and production of the musical film Da Capo (다시 만난 날들; lit. 'The days we met again')), which was released on the 22nd of September 2020, as both an actor and a music director. Da Capo was the opening film of the 16th Jecheon International Music & Film Festival. As part of this project, Hong released his first album titled Da Capo on 22 September 2020.

In 2021, Hong released the song "Kiss Me, Kiss Me" as a soundtrack for Lovestruck in the City, "Pain" for Happiness soundtrack.".

On 4 September 2021, Hong appeared on KBS show Immortal Songs: Singing the Legend. He appeared in Episode 521, winning against Song So-hee with Jeon In-kwon's song "Don't You Worry". Hong lost to Im Tae-kyung overall. He also completed narration and interviews for Hong Jin-kyung's show Hong Jin-kyung's glorious life as a devotee throughout 2021, with his first appearance being in Episode 10 (which was aired on 24 September 2021).

In 2022, Hong released the song "Can't Run Away" as the soundtrack of Through the Darkness (TV series)., "Dive in" as part of Military Prosecutor Doberman's OST and "I Think I Know" for My Liberation Notes. Hong also released "Since today", which was followed by a pair of singles grouped under the title "Stay" (있을게) named "Stay" and "Rain". Following these releases, Hong made his first appearances on Korean music broadcast shows, performing his single "Stay".

On 4 March 2022, it was announced that Hong signed an exclusive contract with the entertainment company Achim Archive. From 9 June to 8 November 2022, Hong hosted the radio show Hong Isaac's Gleaning - How to become a lyricist (홍이삭의 이삭줍기 - 작사가 되는법). The show was broadcast by EBS FM and has a total of 10 episodes. Hong also reappeared on KBS' show Immortal Songs: Singing the Legend and reunited with the Yoo Jae Ha Music Contest as the 33rd Contest's co-host alongside Choi Yu-ree.

On 29 January 2023, Hong appeared on Episodes 388 and 389 of MBC's show, King of Mask Singer, as Possibly Masked King Dumpling. In the first round, Hong competed against I am so touched (by the) Japchae (who was revealed to be Mija) where the pair sang "I Have a Girl" by Park Jin-young. Hong won the first round, receiving 79 votes vs Mija's 20. In the second round he performed "In Dream" by Lena Park against 'Sister-In-Law With High Self-Esteem' (who was later revealed to be Moon Hee-Ok), who performed "Hymn of Dreams" by Sim Soo-bong. Hong received 38 votes, losing to his opponent who received 61 votes. The same year, Hong released the song "Wind" (휘) which featured on the OST of the South Korean television series Kokdu: Season of Deity., "Give Me That Night" as part of the OST for South Korean television series My Perfect Stranger, and released a song for the OST of Perfect Shot (Opening) called "Shoot At Me". Hong returned to I Can See Your Voice as a guest panelist for the tenth episode. He also appeared in Episode 1, performing a cover of "Permission to Dance" by BTS as the opening for Season 10 alongside various other past participants.

Hong was selected as a musician to take part of CJ Cultural Foundation's program Tune-Up as part of the 22nd selection group. This program, which "aims to support rookie and indie musicians producing, recording and promoting their music", allowed Hong to produce the EP everland alongside Jazz pianist Jin Soo-young. On April 26, 2023, the EP was released after "six months of close-knit collaboration" with Jazz pianist Jin Soo-young. The two musicians met through a mutual connection who suggested that they were musically compatible. The EP is a 22-minute listen featuring six songs, which are mostly sung in English. A pre-release of the EP's title track "(N)everland" came out as a Korean version of the EP's title track 'everland' on April the 6th 2023, announcing the collaboration between Hong and Soo-young.

Hong opened his second YouTube channel on 30 October 2023 named mm음[音], where he normally uploads short documentaries of his life as a musician (which also cover behind the scenes work both him and his team complete).

=== 2023–Present: JTBC's Sing Again 3, burst of fame ===
From 26 October 2023 to 18 January 2024, Hong appeared on JTBC's third season of their show Sing Again as ‘Singer Number 58’ the "Eternal singer with no expiration date". During the audition round, Hong performed Choi Yu-ree's song "Forest", passing with all eight judges pressing the 'Again' button. From Episode 5 to 11, Hong competed in four rounds, winning all of them. During the first part of the final round, (which aired in Episode 12) Hong received the song, "I Love You" (which was produced by the Korean producer Kim Do-Hun). Hong's highest individual judge score was 100 (received from Code Kunst), his lowest individual judge score was 94 (received from Kim Eana and Lee Hae-ri), his total score was 773, which meant he ranked third out of seven contestants. During the second part of the final round (Episode 13), Hong performed "Song of the Wind" by Cho Yong-Pil. His highest individual judge score was 97 (received from Kim Eana), his lowest individual judge score was 92 (received from Baek Ji-young), his total judge score was 761, which ranked him sixth out of seven contestants..

The show's winner was announced at the end of Episode 13's broadcast, where they also received the grand prize of 300,000,000 KRW. Hong got a score of 212.20 for Online early voting (first out of seven), 839.78 for Part 1 of the final (first out of seven), 282.85 for Part 2 of the final (sixth out of seven) and 1604.36 for the Real-Time voting score (first out of seven). Thus, Hong finished with an accumulated score of 2939.19 (around 1000 points more than second place), placing him in first and making him the show's winner.

In 2024, Hong released the single, "Because There Is Love" (produced by Choi Yu-ree who he has interacted and worked with on multiple occasions), featured on the OST for season two of Gyeongseong Creature with his song "Gradation in Light", and released the song "Fallin'" as a soundtrack to Queen of Tears. Said soundtrack "further skyrocketed his fame" as the TV show, and in turn the soundtrack, gained popularity. Hong was invited to perform at the 2024 KCON (music festival) held in Chiba, Japan over from 10 until 12 May. He also performed at the KCON in Los Angeles, America, on July 26–28th. These performances "on international stages...put his name on the map".

In 2025, Hong released the single 'Lovers'. He made his second appearance on KBS' show Immortal Songs: Singing the Legend. He appeared in Episode 688, in which he competed against Jeon Yu-Jin with Kim Kwang-seok's song "On the Street". Hong won against Jeon Yu-Jin during the first round, and was declared 688 Episode's final winner. On 20 January, Hong began recruitment for his first official fan club, announcing that his fans were referred to as "Toast". On 27 February Hong released the EP 'The Lovers Notes' which features five songs, running for 18 minutes and 12 seconds. On 8 March, Hong released the song 'Dreaming' which appeared on the OST of the musical 'Dream High' which he sung with actor Kim Soo-hyun. On 15 June, Hong released the single 'In You' which appeared on Our Unwritten Seoul's Original Soundtrack Part.4.

== Discography ==
=== Singles ===
Title	English Title	English Translation	Single details
"하나님의 세계"	The World My Lord Resides In	God's World	Artist: Hong Isaac; Running Time: 3 minutes 55 second; Released: 30 January 2015; Label/Copyright: Sound republic, Hong Isaac; Genre: Contemporary Christian music; Formats: Digital download
"모닥불"	Campfire	-	Artist: Hong Isaac; Running Time: 4 minutes 44 seconds; Released: 2 February 2019; Label/Copyright: Hong Isaac (under licence to Genie Music Corporation); Genre: Folk, Blues; Formats: Digital download
"오늘도 꿈에서 그대가"	You liked me in my dreams	Even today in my dream, you	Artist: Hong Isaac; Running Time: 3 minutes 43 seconds; Released: 11 September 2019; Label/Copyright: Hong Isaac, Dreamus; Genre: R&B, Soul; Formats: Digital download
"네가 없는 하루"	Without You	A day without you	Artist: Hong Isaac; Running Time: 3 minutes 26 seconds; Released: 5 May 2020; Label/Copyright: Hong Isaac, Dreamus; Genre: Ballad; Formats: Digital download
"있을게"	Stay	I'll be (there/ here)	Artist: Hong Isaac; Running Time: 3 minutes 46 seconds; Released: 21 August 2022; Label/Copyright: Hong Isaac, Archive Achim; Genre: Ballad; Formats: Digital download
"비"	Rain	-	Artist: Hong Isaac; Running Time: 2 minutes 47 seconds; Released: 21 August 2022; Label/Copyright: Hong Isaac, Archive Achim; Genre: Ballad; Formats: Digital download
"(n)everland"	-	-	Artist: Hong Isaac, Chin Sooyoung; Running Time: 3 minutes 12 seconds; Released: 6 April 2023; Label/Copyright: Archive Achim; Genre: R&B, Soul, Jazz; Formats: Digital download
"사랑은 하니까"	Because There Is Love	Because (I/we: ambiguous) Love (you: ambiguous)	Artist: Hong Isaac; Running Time: 4 minutes 35 seconds; Released: 29 February 2024; Label/Copyright: Archive Achim; Genre: Ballad; Formats: Digital download
"Lovers"	-	-	Artist: Hong Isaac; Running Time: 4 minutes; Released: 24 January 2025; Label/Copyright: Music Farm Ent., under license to Kakao Entertainment; Genre: Ballad; Formats: Digital download

=== Albums ===
Title	English Title	English Translation	Album details
시간이 지나도	As Time Passes By	Even as time passes/ Even after a while	Artist: Hong Isaac; Running Time: 24 minutes; Released: 18 August 2015; Label/Copyright: HONG&I, 미러볼 뮤직; Formats: Digital download; Track listing: 1. "지친하루" (English Title: A Weary Day, English Translation: Tired Day); 2. "시간이 지나도" (English Title: As Time Passes By, English Translation: Even as time passes/ Even after a while); 3. "구름" (English Title: Cloud); 4. "Like A Fool"; 5. "길을 걷다" (English Title: A Walk, English Translation: Walk (the) Road); 6. "봄아 - Piano Version" (English Title: Dear Spring - Piano Version, English Translation: Spring - Piano Version)
놓치고 싶지 않은 사소한 것들	-	-	Artist: Hong Isaac; Running Time: 15 minutes; Released: 6 December 2019; Label/Copyright: Dreamus, Hong Isaac; Formats: Digital download; Track listing: 1. "잠" (English Title: A Nap, English Translation: Sleep); 2. "Let's Be Friends"; 3. "별 같아서" (English Title: Like A Star, English Translation: (It/you: ambiguous) is/are like a star); 4. "소년" (English Title: A boy, English Translation: Boy)
마음이 내려 쌓이면	Heartfall	When hearts/thoughts fall down and pile up	Artist: Hong Isaac; Running Time: 10 minutes; Released: 10 December 2021; Label/Copyright: 미러볼 뮤직, HONG&I; Formats: Digital download; Track listing: 1. "마음이 내려 쌓이면" (English Title: Heartfall, English Translation: When hearts/thoughts fall down and pile up); 2. "나쁘지 않아" (English Title: Not so Bad, English Translation: Not bad); 3. "Little Lights"
everland	-	-	Artist: Hong Isaac, Chin Sooyoung; Running Time: 22 minutes; Released: 26 April 2023; Label/Copyright: Archive Achim; Formats: Digital download; Track listing: 1. "her" 2. "everland" 3. "pages" 4. "a bird" 5. "(n)everland" 6. "her (director's cut)"
The Lovers Note	-	-	Artist: Hong Isaac; Running Time: 18 minutes 12 seconds; Released: 27 February 2025; Label/Copyright: Music Farm ent., under license to Kakao Entertainment; Formats: Digital download; Track listing: 1. "Lovers"; 2. "Steps Toward You"; 3. "In The Stars"; 4. "Kidult"; 5. "aewol"

=== Sound Tracks (OSTs) ===
==== Drama/Series ====
Song title, year of release, album of release, and artist
Title	English Title	English Translation	Year	Album	Artist
"Ruin"	-	-	2019	Hell Is Other People (TV series) Pt.4 (Original Television Soundtrack)	Hong Isaac
"Farewell Restaurant"	-	-	2020	Farewell Restaurant OST	Joy Kim (featuring Hong Isaac & April Ahn)
"바다야 안녕 (자취방 ver.)"	The Sea (Movie ver.)	Bye/Hi Sea (Movie ver.)	2020	Da Capo	Hong Isaac
"디스토리어(Practice Room Ver.)"	Destroyer (Practice Room Ver.)	-	2020	Da Capo	Hong Isaac
"설렘 (만들기 ver.)"	Spring Romance (Practice Room ver.)	Thrill (Practice Room ver.)	2020	Da Capo	Hong Isaac
"노잉유"	Knowing You	-	2020	Da Capo	Hong Isaac
"등대길"	Walking Romance	Lighthouse Road	2020	Da Capo	Hong Isaac
"대화"	Conversation	-	2020	Da Capo	Hong Isaac
"모르겠다 (Practice Room Ver.)"	IDK (Practice Room Ver.)	I Don't Know (Practice Room Ver.)	2020	Da Capo	Hong Isaac
"모르겠다"	IDK	I don't know	2020	Da Capo	Hong Isaac
"다시 만난 날들 interlude"	Da Capo Interlude	The Days We Meet Again Interlude	2020	Da Capo	Hong Isaac
"재회"	Au Revoir	Reunion	2020	Da Capo	Hong Isaac
"재회 (제마 ver.)"	Au Revoir (Jemma ver.)	Reunion (Jemma ver.)	2020	Da Capo	Hong Isaac
"갈등"	Lonely Light House	Conflict	2020	Da Capo	Hong Isaac
"디스토리어"	Destroyer	-	2020	Da Capo	Hong Isaac
"안녕"	Friends Again	Hi/bye	2020	Da Capo	Hong Isaac
"잠자리 지우개"	Dragonfly Eraser	-	2020	Da Capo	Hong Isaac
"바다야 안녕"	The Sea	Bye/Hi Sea	2020	Da Capo	Hong Isaac
"설렘"	Spring Romance	Thrill	2020	Da Capo	Hong Isaac
"노잉유 (현장 ver.)"	Knowing You (Movie ver.)	-	2020	Da Capo	Hong Isaac
"Close Your Eyes"	-	-	2020	The Uncanny Counter (Original Television Soundtrack), Pt.1	Hong Isaac
"Kiss Me, Kiss Me"	-	-	2021	Lovestruck in the City (Original Television Soundtrack), Pt.8	Hong Isaac
"The Visitor"	-	-	2021	Times (Original Television Soundtrack), Pt.2	Hong Isaac (featuring Klazy)
"Pain"	-	-	2021	Happiness (South Korean TV series), Pt.2 (Original Television Soundtrack)	Hong Isaac
"Can't Run Away"	-	-	2021	Through the Darkness (TV series) OST Part.2	Hong Isaac
"Dive in"	-	-	2022	Military Prosecutor Doberman, Pt.4 (Original Television Soundtrack)	Hong Isaac
"알 것도 같아"	I Think I Know	-	2022	My Liberation Notes OST Part 10	Hong Isaac
"휘"	Wind	(sound of wind)	2023	Kokdu: Season of Deity (Original Television Soundtrack, Pt.2)	Hong Isaac
"그 밤을 내게 줘요"	-	Give me your night/I'll take your night	2023	My Perfect Stranger OST Part.6	Hong Isaac
"나를 쏘다"	Shoot At Me	-	2023	Perfect Shot (Opening Original Soundtrack)	Hong Isaac
"Be with you"	-	-	2023	A Time Called You (Original Soundtrack from the Netflix Series)	Hong Isaac
"Fallin'"	-	-	2024	Queen of Tears (Original Television Soundtrack), Pt.5	Hong Isaac
"Gradation in Light"	-	-	2024	Gyeongseong Creature S2 OST	Hong Isaac
"In You"	-	-	2025	Our Unwritten Seoul (Original Soundtrack), Part. 4	Hong Isaac

==== Musicals ====
Song title, year of release, album of release, and artist
Title	Year	Album	Artist
"Dreaming"	2025	Dream High	Kim Soo-hyun, Hong Isaac

=== Features ===
Song title, date of release, album of release, and artist
Title	English Title	English Translation	Year	Album	Artist
"봄아"	Spring	-	30 May 2014	The 24th You Jae Ha Music Competition	Hong Isaac
"한걸음 뒤에 서면 보이는 것들"	One Step Behind	Things you can see when you stand one step behind	30 May 2014	The 24Th You Jae Ha Music Competition	Hong Isaac, Yoo Bo-young, Young-yon, Lee Seol-a, Almond, Lee Yerin, Min-ju, D.Avant
"To You"	-	-	12 October 2015	1집 동화됙다	Hong Isaac and Meenoi (as part of the Meenoi project)
"클레멘타인"	Clementine	-	27 April 2018	Clementine	Hong Isaac and Meenoi
"On the Road (feat. 홍이삭)"	-	On the Road (feat. Hong Isaac)	28 December 2018	On the Road (feat. 홍이삭)	Hong Isaac, Jin Ju Yu
"So Nice (feat. So Soo Bin, Stella Jang, OuiOui, Lee Min-hyuk, Zai.ro, Hong Isaac)"	-	-	2 October 2019	So Nice (feat. So Soo-bin, Stella Jang, OuiOui, Lee Min-hyuk, Zai.ro, Hong Isaac) GMF 2019	Hong Isaac, So Soo-bin, Stella Jang, OuiOui, Lee Min-hyuk, Zai.ro
"Home"	-	-	October 2, 2019	Our Yoo Jae Ha Vol.4 - YoodongTV	Hong Isaac, Ahn Si-on, D'avant, Lee Shin-young, Jo Ae-ran, Yunini, Haepa, Baek Seung-hwan, Surim, Kimhwol
"Loved You Better (feat. Isaac Hong)"	-	-	December 11, 2019	Loved You Better	Hong Isaac, Holland (singer)
"Knock Knoch (with Hong Isaac)"	-	-	February 10, 2021	Discovery	Hong Isaac and Park Jeon-ha
"저 별처럼 18"	Like a Star (feat. Isaac Hong)	-	February 25, 2021	Like a Star	Hong Isaac and Mellow Kitchen
"Since Today"	-	-	August 5, 2022	Since Today	Hong Isaac (as part of Memory Project under license to YG Plus)
"My Love Beside Me (feat. Isaac Hong)"	-	-	May 16, 2024	Famous Singers And Street Judges EP.10	Hong Isaac, Tejong

== Awards ==
Year	Award/ competition	Ranking	Ref.
2013	24th Yoo Jae-ha Music Contest	Bronze Medal (Third place)	
2013	24th Yoo Jae-ha Music Contest	Alumni Association Award	
2024	Sing Again 3	First Place	
2024	2024 Universal Superstar Awards	Universal Indie Icon Award	
2024	2024 Brand of the Year Awards	Best Male Vocal	
2025	2025 Immortal Song 2 [Sing a Legend] Episode 688	Part 1 Winner	

== Other activities ==
- Seoul Museum of Art 'Music + Museum Night' - 'Obsession' Music Director
- Seoul Arts Centre Creative Music 'All That Shanghai' - Nierl (Cancelled due to COVID-19 pandemic)
- First and second fan signing events were held 17 and 31 March 2024 in celebration of the release of 'Because There Is Love'
- Participated in writing the lyrics for and composing "Good Neighbours by Your Side" from Good Neighbors Effect Soung Source on May 31, 2024
- Participated in Korea Hydro and Nuclear Power's project 'Blooming Together' on 31 May 2024

== Notes ==
1. Hong's first all-English album
