= Superband (TV program) =

South Korean television show

- Hangul: 슈퍼밴드
- RR: Syupeobaendeu
- MR: Syup'ŏbaendŭ
- Genre: talent show reality television
- Presented by: Jun Hyun-moo
- Judges: Yoon Jong-shin; Yoon Sang; Kim Jong-wan (Nell); Joe Hahn; Lee Su-hyun
- Country of origin: South Korea
- Original language: Korean
- No. of episodes: 14

Production
- Executive producer: Kim Hyeong-jung (김형중)
- Running time: 80 mins

Original release
- Network: JTBC
- Release: April 12 – July 12, 2019

Superband (Korean: 슈퍼밴드) is a South Korean talent show produced by JTBC in 2019, where indie musicians were invited to perform and eventually create a "superband", competing against each other.

The average viewership rating was around 3%, and the show received positive and negative feedback, as well. The concept and its genre diversity was praised, while the media heavily criticised the lack of female participants. Only involving the viewers in the decision process at the end of the show drew criticism, as well.

Besides the winning band, the 2nd, 3rd, 5th and 6th place bands also signed with different production companies after the show.

The winner was Hoppipolla. The show was produced by the same production team of Phantom Singer and Hidden Singer.

== Concept ==
The show invited 121 indie musicians, from street performers to classical musicians, representing a variety of genres. The judges pre-selected a handful of participants, whose task was to create ad-hoc bands during the show and compete against each other. The main prize was a hundred million KRW, a recording contract, a world tour, and an SUV.

Out of the 121 participants, 53 were selected for the show, the pre-selection process was not aired. The selected musicians staged introductory performances during the first two episodes, during which some performances were only uploaded to an online platform. During the first two rounds, each stage consisted of one battle of two ad-hoc bands. 16 frontmen for these bands were picked by the judges (named 'Producers' in the show), the frontmen then picked their desired team members. A musician could only be picked for one team. Stages were evaluated by judges, who gave points for each performance. At the end of the rounds, weakest musicians from the losing teams of the battles were eliminated.

The show was mainly pre-produced and recorded, and broadcast heavily edited. The finals were aired live. During the finals, points from the first and second semi-finals (35%), online pre-voting (5%) and text message voting from viewers during the live broadcast (60%) decided final ranking.

== Judges ==
The judges, named "Producers" in the show:

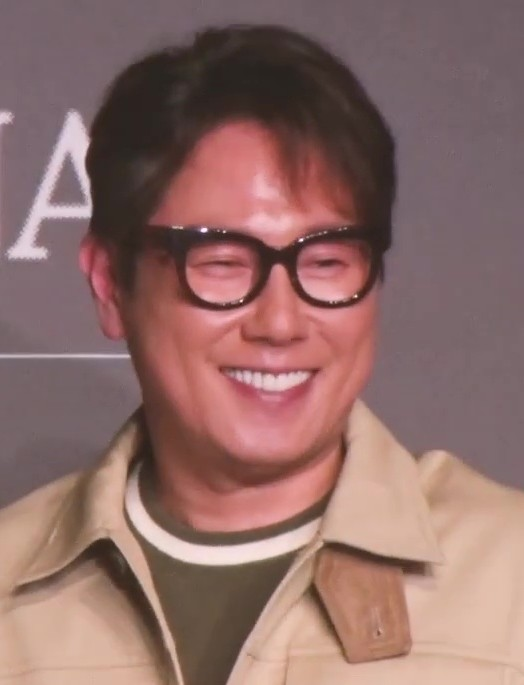
Yoon Jong-shin singer-songwriter, producer

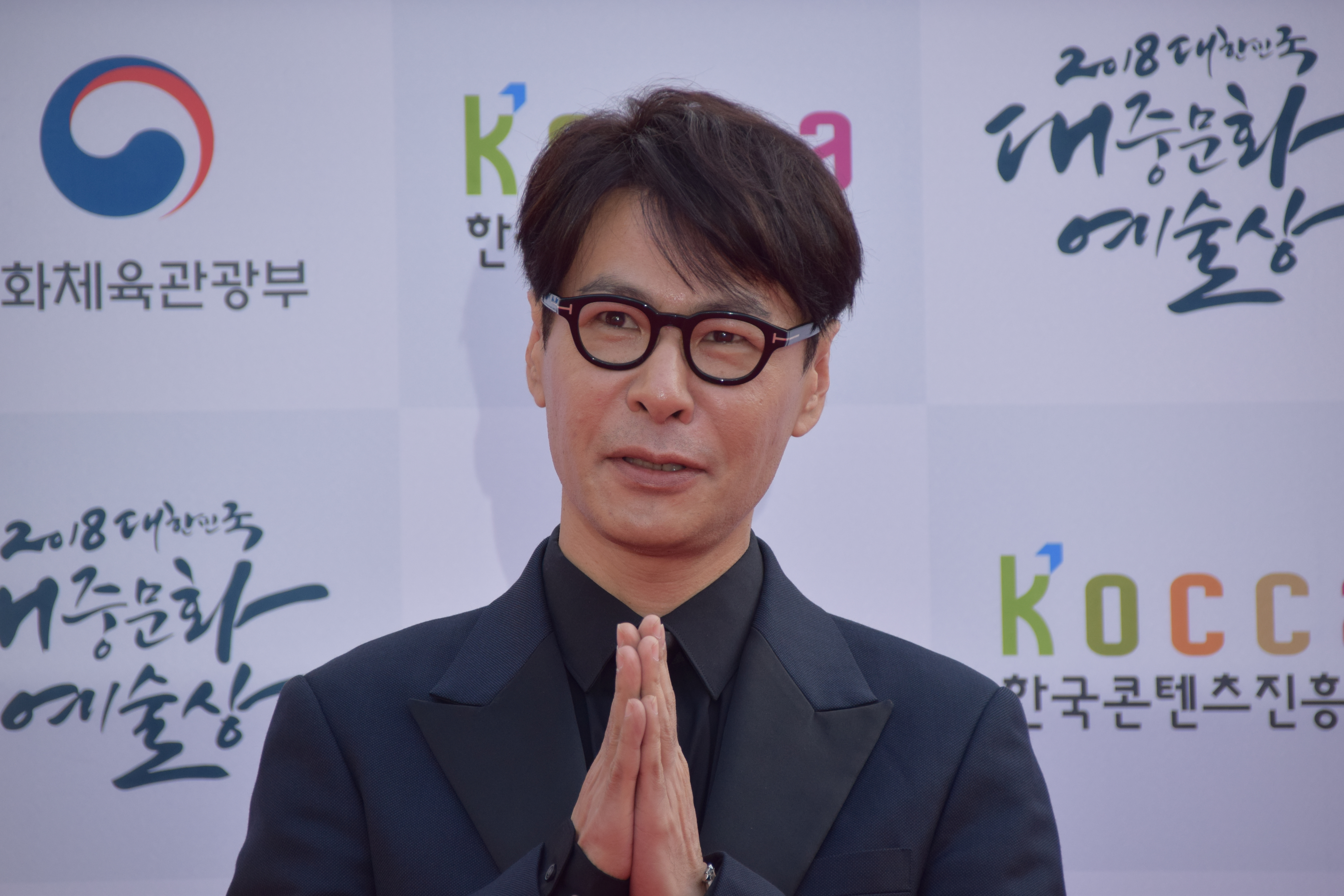
Yoon Sang (member of the OnePiece production team)

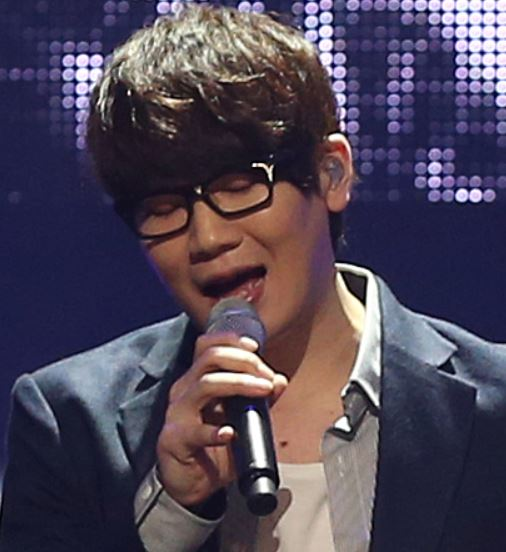
Kim Jong-wan (Nell)

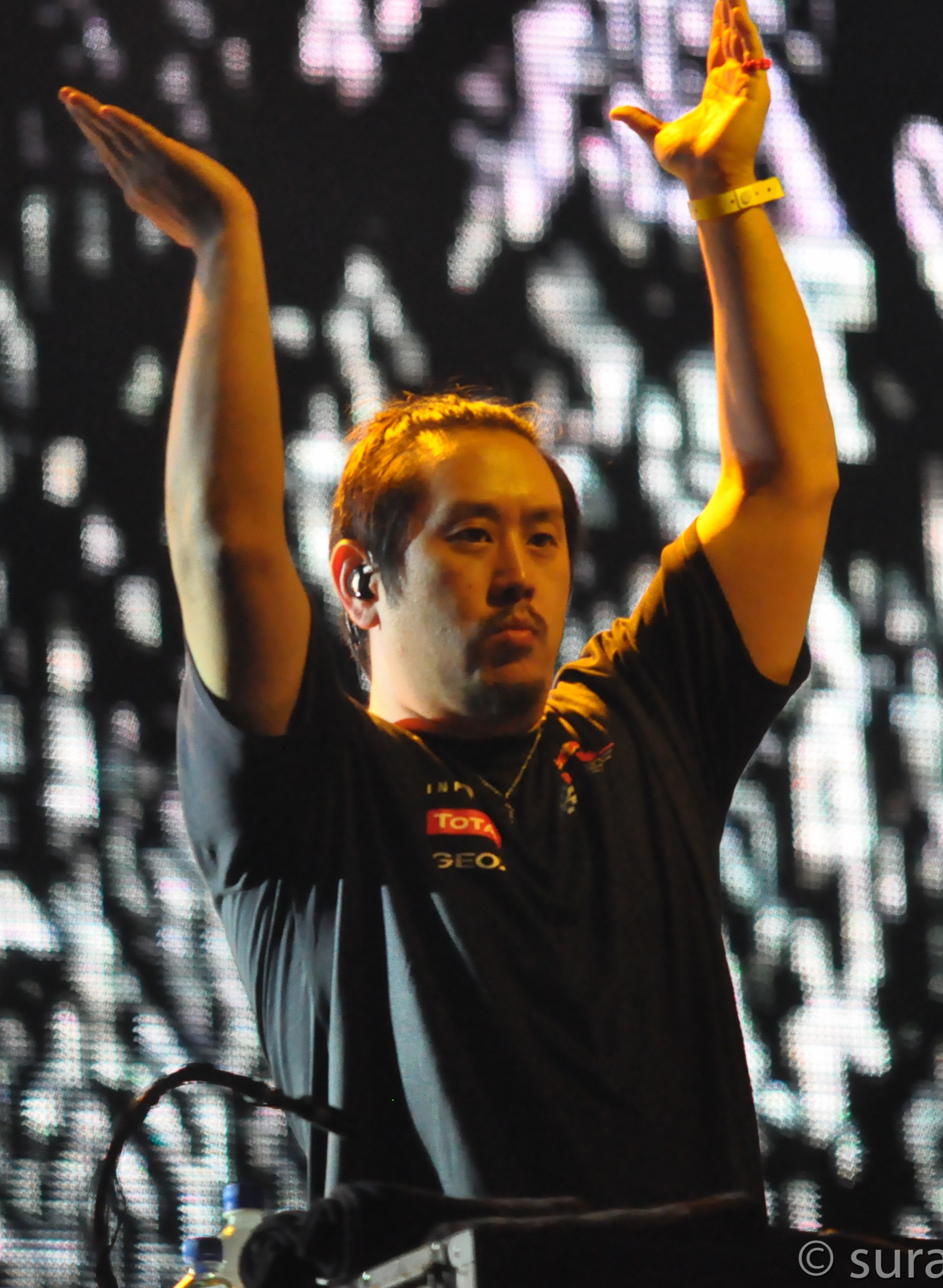
Joe Hahn (Linkin Park)

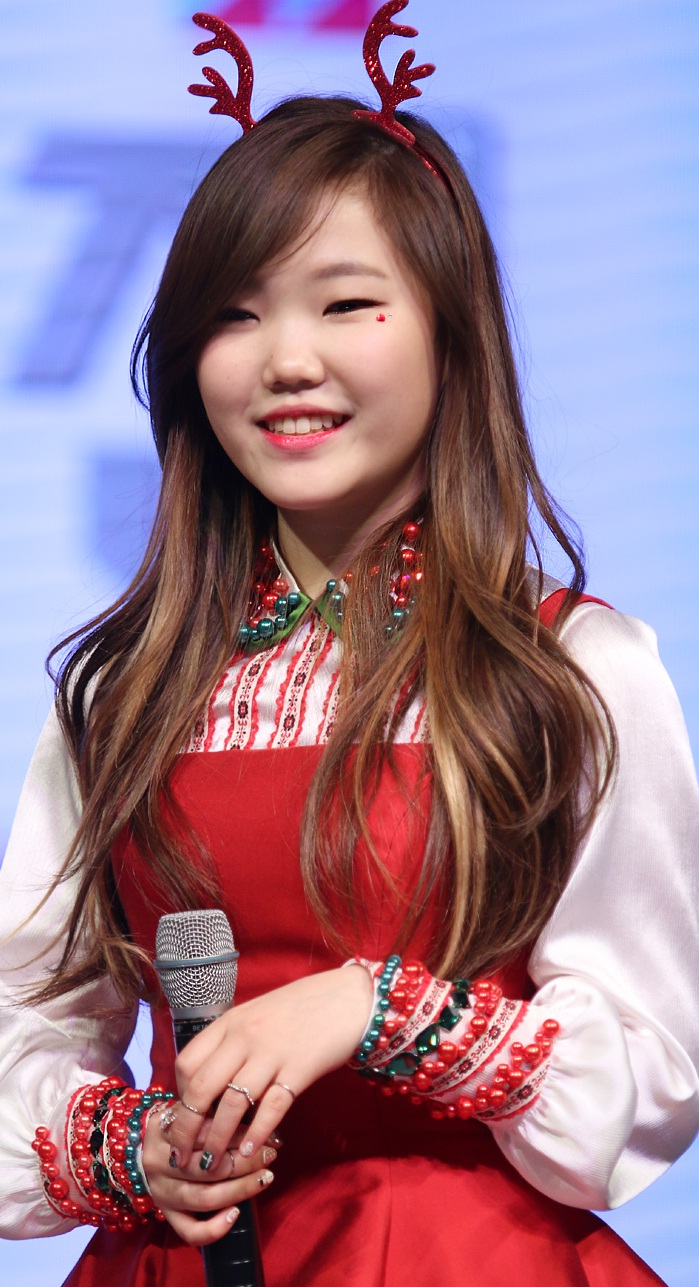
Lee Su-hyun (Akdong Musician)

== Participants ==
Instrument	Name	Rounds (R)				Semi-finals	Finals	Note
Instrument	Name	1R	2R	3R	4R	Semi-finals	Finals	Note
Singer	Kim Woo-sung (김우성)							Member of The Rose
Singer	Kim Ji-beom (김지범)							
Singer	Shin Gwang-il (신광일)							Member of LUCY
Singer	I'll						winning team	No Min-woo's brother, member of Hoppipolla
Singer	Ahn Seong-jin (안성진)							member of The Vipers
Singer	Lee Yong-hun (이용훈)							
Singer	Lee Ju-hyeok (이주혁)							Member of the Gift (기프트), 5th place in Sing again2
Singer	Lee Chan-sol (이찬솔)							Member of Bandage
Singer	Im Geun-ju (임근주)							Member of Kaneungdong baendeu (가능동밴드)
Singer	Zairo (자이로)							
Singer	Jo Gon (조곤)							Member of 9001
Singer	Jo Han-gyeol (조한결)							
Singer	Yu Ji-sang (유지상)							Son of Yoo Dong-geun (유동근) and Jeon In-hwa (전인화)
Singer	Chanhwi (찬휘)							
Singer	Chae Bo-hun (채보훈)							The VANE
Singer	Choi Sang-yeop (최상엽)							Member of LUCY
Singer	Kevin Oh (케빈 오)							Winner of Superstar K 7
Singer	Ha Hyun-sang (하현상)						winning team	member of Hoppipolla
Singer	Hong Isaac (홍이삭)							
guitar	Kim Yeong-so (김영소)						winning team	member of Hoppipolla
guitar	Kim Jun-hyeop (김준협)							Member of 9001
guitar	Park Ji-hwan (박지환)							Member of Yaenebara (얘네바라), member of The Midnight Romance
guitar	Sin Hyeon-bin (신현빈)							Member of Bandage
guitar	Yang Ji-wan (양지완)							Member of Cardean (카딘)
guitar	Lee Gang-ho (이강호)							
guitar	Im Hyeong-bin (임형빈)							Pastmember of Bandage
guitar	Hwang Seung-min (황승민)							Member of Shirts Boy Frank (셔츠보이프랭크)
bass guitar	Kim Ha-jin (김하진)							Member of Cardean (카딘)
bass guitar	Kim Hyeong-u (김형우)							Member of Gift (기프트)
bass guitar	Lee Jeong-hun (이종훈)							
bass guitar	Jo Won-sang (조원상)							Member of Yaenebara (얘네바라) and LUCY
drums	Gang Gyeong-yun (강경윤)							Member of Bandage
drums	Kim Chi-heon (김치헌)							
drums	Park Yeong-jin (박영진)							
drums	Lee Si-yeong (이시영)							
drums	Jeong Gwang-hyeon (정광현)							
drums	Choi Yeong-jin (최영진)							
drums	Hwang Min-jae (황민재)							Member of One Nation (원네이션), member of D82
piano keyboards	Kim Gyu-mok (김규목)							Member of HOA (호아)
piano keyboards	Lee Na-u (이나우)							
saxophone	Kim Dong-beom (김동범)							
saxophone	Mellow Kitchen (멜로우 키친)							
classic guitar	Kim U-tak (김우탁)							
Violin	Nam Geun-hyeong (남근형)							
Violin	Benji (벤지)							Member of B.I.G
Violin	Shin Ye-chan (신예찬)							Member of Kaneungdong baendeu (가능동밴드) and LUCY
cello	Park Chan-yeong (박찬영)							
cello	Hong Jinho (홍진호)						winning team	member of Hoppipolla
disc jockey	Nomad (노마드)							
disc jockey	DPOLE (디폴)							
harmonica	Park Jong-seong (박종성)							
accordion	Lee Ja-won (이자원)							
percussions	Jeong Sol (정솔)							

== Performances ==
=== Episodes 3–5: 1st round ===
Eliminated participants
Chanhwi
Choi Sang-yeop
Kim Chi-heon
Park Jong-seong

Episode	Battle	Team	Members	Song title	Original performer	Video	Producer points
3.	1	Jo Won-sang	Jo Won-sang; Lee Gang-ho; Im Hyeong-bin; Kim Yeong-so	Adventure of a Lifetime	Coldplay		5:0
3.	1	Ha Hyun-sang	Ha Hyun-sang; Shin Ye-chan; Hong Jin-ho	Viva La Vida	Coldplay		5:0
3.	2	Hong Isaac	Hong Isaac; Jeong Sol; Lee Na-u; Lee Ja-won	Childhood Memories (내 기억 속의 소년)	own composition		1:4
3.	2	Kevin Oh	Kevin Oh; Lee Jong-hun; Gang Gyeong-yun	Fireflies	Owl City		1:4
4.	3	Benji	Benji; DPOLE; Jo Han-gyeol	Fairy of Shampoo (샴푸의 요정)	Bitgwa sogeum (빛과 소금)		3:2
4.	3	Im Geun-ju	Im Geun-ju; Kim U-tak; Nam Geun-hyeong; Park Chan-yeong	Oh You Are My Beautiful Lady (오 그대는 아름다운 여인)	Deulgukhwa (들국화)		3:2
4.	4	I'll	I'll; Kim Dong-beom; Kim Chi-heon; Park Ji-hwan	Spring Day	BTS		2:3
4.	4	Zai.Ro	Zai.Ro; Sin Gwang-il; Lee Yong-hun; Yu Ji-sang	Hard To Say I'm Sorry	Chicago		2:3
4.	5	Yang Ji-wan	Yang Ji-wan; Kim Ha-jin; Jeong Gwang-hyeon; Chae Bo-hun	Paradise Lost	Gain		1:4
4.	5	An Seong-jin	An Seong-jin; Hwang Seung-min; Kim Gyu-mok; Choi Yeong-jin	Marble (대리암)	own composition		1:4
5.	6	Kim Woo-sung	Kim Woo-sung; Lee Chan-sol	Sign of the Times	Harry Styles		3:2
5.	6	Choi Sang-yeop	Choi Sang-yeop; Park Jong-seong	Strange (이상해)	Lee Juck		3:2
5.	7	Lee Ju-hyeok	Lee Ju-hyeok; Kim Hyeong-u; Nomad	O	Coldplay		4:1
5.	7	Mellow Kitchen	Mellow Kitchen; Park Yeong-jin; Chanhwi	Problem	Ariana Grande		4:1
–	–	Kim Ji-beom	Kim Ji-beom; Sin Hyeon-bin; Lee Si-yeong	5GLOVE	own composition		not broadcast (winner: Kim Ji-beom's team)
–	–	Jo Gon	Jo Gon; Kim Jun-hyeop; Hwang Min-jae	Kidult	own composition		not broadcast (winner: Kim Ji-beom's team)

=== Episodes 5–7: 2nd round ===
Eliminated participants
Lee Yong-hun
Im Geun-ju
Jo Gon
Lee Gang-ho
Kim Gyu-mok
Mellow Kitchen
Nam Geun-hyeong
Jeong Sol

Episode	Battle	Team	Members	Song title	Original performer	Video	Producer points
5.	1	I'll	I'll; Kim Yeong-so; Nomad; Hong Jin-ho	Castle on the Hill	Ed Sheeran		3:2
5.	1	Chae Bo-hun	Chae Bo-hun; Jeong Gwang-hyeon; Lee Na-u	Stop Crying Your Heart Out	Oasis		3:2
6.	2	Jo Won-sang	Jo Won-sang; Lee Gang-ho; Jeong Sol; Ha Hyun-sang	Virtual Insanity	Jamiroquai		0:5
6.	2	Kevin Oh	Kevin Oh; Gang Gyeong-yun; Sin Gwang-il; Park Chan-yeong	Is There Nobody? (누구없소)	Han Yeong-ae (한영애)		0:5
6.	3	Kim Ji-beom	Kim Ji-beom; Sin Hyeong-bin; Jo Gon	Love Me Through the Night	own composition		2:3
6.	3	Benji	Benji; Kim Dong-beom; Lee Ja-won	TEASER (예고편)	own composition		2:3
6.	4	An Seong-jin	An Seong-jin; Kim Gyu-mok; Choi Yong-jin; Hwang Seung-min	F=ma	own composition		2:3
6.	4	Park Yeong-jin	Park Yeong-jin; Kim Ha-jin; Yang Ji-wan; Hong Isaac	Royals	Lorde		2:3
7.	5	Kim Woo-sung	Kim Woo-sung; DPOLE; Mellow Kitchen; Kim Hyeong-u	ILYSB (I Love You So Bad)	LANY		1:4
7.	5	Lee Jeong-hun	Lee Jeong-hun; Hwang Min-jae; Lee Chan-sol	Skyfall	Adele		1:4
7.	6	Lee Ju-hyeok	Lee Ju-hyeok; Im Hyeong-bin; Kim Jun-hyeop	Adolescence (소년)	Yoon Sang		4:1
7.	6	Sin Ye-chan	Sin Ye-chan; Kim U-tak; Nam Geun-hyeong; Im Geun-ju	Days of Our Past (지난 날)	Yu Jae-ha		4:1
7.	7	Park Ji-hwan	Park Ji-hwan; Lee Yong-hun; Yu Ji-sang	There's Nothing Holdin' Me Back	Shawn Mendes		1:4
7.	7	Zai.ro	Zai.ro; Jo Han-gyeol; Lee Si-yeong	Smooth	Santana		1:4

=== Episodes 8–9: 3rd round ===
Eliminated participants
Kim Ji-beom
Kim Dong-beom
Nomad
Lee Ja-won
Kim U-tak

Episode	Battle	Team	Members	Song title	Original performer	Video	Producer points
8.	1	Kevin Oh	Kevin Oh; Gang Gyeong-yun; Kim Jun-hyeop; Nomad	Halo	Beyoncé		0:5
8.	1	Zai.ro	Zai.ro; Lee Si-yeong; Jo Han-gyeol	Sucker	Jonas Brothers		0:5
8.	2	I'll	I'll; Kim Hyeong-u; Ha Hyun-sang; Hong Jin-ho	1000x	Jarryd James		5:0
8.	2	Lee Na-u	Lee Na-u; Kim Yeong-so; Kim Woo-sung	Home	Park Hyo-shin		5:0
8.	3	DPOLE	DPOLE; Kim Dong-beom; Im Hyeong-bin; Hwang Seung-min	Ghostbusters	Ray Parker Jr.		0:5
8.	3	Choi Yeong-jin	Choi Yeong-jin; Park Chan-yeong; Lee Chan-sol	Say Something	A Great Big World		0:5
9.	4	Lee Jong-hun	Lee Jong-hun; Jeong Gwang-hyeon; Chae Bo-hun	The Dance in the Rhythm (리듬 속의 그 춤을)	Kim Wan-sun		0:5
9.	4	Lee Ju-hyeok	Lee Ju-hyeok; Sin Gwang-il; Sin Ye-chan	Hold Back The River	James Bay		0:5
9.	5	Park Ji-hwan	Park Ji-hwan; Kim U-tak; Lee Ja-won	Yo Soy Maria	Astor Piazzolla		2:3
9.	5	Benji	Benji; An Seong-jin; Yu Ji-sang	Sing	Pentatonix		2:3
9.	6	Park Yeong-jin	Park Yeong-jin; Kim Ha-jin; Yang Ji-wan; Hong Isaac	The Time Of My Life	Bill Medley & Jennifer Warnes		4:1
9.	6	Sin Hyeong-bin	Sin Hyeong-bin; Kim Ji-beom; Jo Won-sang; Hwang Min-jae	You In The Vague Memory (흐린 기억 속의 그대)	Hyun Jin-young		4:1

=== Episodes 10–11: 4th round ===
Eliminated participants
Park Yeong-jin
Park Ji-hwan
Hwang Seung-min
Lee Si-yeong
Park Chan-yeong
Sin Hyeon-bin
Jo Han-gyeol
An Seong-jin
Yu Ji-sang

Episode	Battle	Team	Members	Song title	Original performer	Video	H. p.	L. P.	Total
10.	1	Kim Yeong-so	Kim Yeong-so; Jeong Gwang-hyeon; Park Chan-yeong; Park Yeong-jin	Arirang Fantasy (아리랑 판타지)	own composition (Kim Yeong-so)		90	75	422
10.	2	Hwang Min-jae	Hwang Min-jae; Kim Woo-sung; Kim Ha-jin; Park Ji-hwan	Cake by The Ocean	DNCE		86	75	408
10.	3	Kim Jun-hyeop	Kim Jun-hyeop; Gang Gyeong-yun; Lee Chan-sol; Im Hyeong-bin	Still Fighting It	Ben Folds		95	89	455
10.	4	Lee Na-u	Lee Na-u; Yang Ji-wan; Kevin Oh; Hong Isaac	With You (너와 함께)	own composition		90	78	423
10.	5	Kim Hyeong-u	Kim Hyeong-u; I'll; Ha Hyun-sang; Hong Jin-ho	Creep	Radiohead		98	82	443
11.	6	Jo Han-gyeol	Jo Han-gyeol; Zai.ro; Yu Ji-sang; Lee Si-yeong	Tears in Heaven	Eric Clapton		88	85	430
11.	7	Lee Ju-hyeok	Lee Ju-hyeok; Sin Gwang-il; Sin Ye-chan; Jo Won-sang	Swim	Fickle Friends		93	88	453
11.	8	Benji	Benji; Sin Hyeon-bin; Lee Jong-hun; Choi Yeong-jin	Dancin	own composition		95	87	452
11.	9	Hwang Seung-min	Hwang Seung-min; DPOLE; An Seong-jin; Chae Bo-hun	Umbrella (우산)	own composition (Chae Bo-hun)		90	79	429

=== Episode 12: 1st semi-final ===
Producer points
	Yun S.	J. Hahn	Yun J.	Lee S.	Kim J.
Lucy	910	840	950	960	980
Moné	960	850	980	900	920
Hoppipolla	950	860	930	950	900
People on the Bridge	920	850	990	930	900
Purple Rain	890	850	930	930	990
Aftermoon	930	830	910	910	900

Ep.	#	Team	Members	Song title	Original performer	Video	H. P.	L. P.	Prod. P.	V. P.	Total
12.	1	Hoppipolla (호피플라)	I'll; Kim Yeong-so; Ha Hyun-sang; Hong Jin-ho	Hoppípolla	Sigur Rós		950	860	4,590	2,660	7,250
12.	2	Aftermoon (애프터문)	Kevin Oh; DPOLE; Lee Jong-hun; Choi Yeong-jin	Time After Time	Cyndi Lauper		930	830	4,480	2,600	7,080
12.	3	Lucy (루시)	Lee Ju-hyeok; Sin Gwang-il; Sin Ye-chan; Jo Won-sang	Cry Bird	Tennyson		980	830	4,640	2,820	7,460
12.	4	Moné (모네)	Zai.ro; Kim Woo-sung; Benji; Hong Isaac; Hwang Min-jae	Take Me Away (가져가)	own composition		980	850	4,610	2,430	7,040
12.	5	Purple Rain (퍼플레인)	Yang Ji-wan; Kim Ha-jin; Lee Na-u; Jeong Gwang-hyeon; Chae Bo-hun	Dream On	Aerosmith		990	850	4,590	2,750	7,340
12.	6	People on the Bridge (피플 온 더 브릿지)	Lee Chan-sol; Gang Gyeong-yun; Kim Jun-hyeop; Kim Hyeong-u; Im Hyeong-bin	Best Of You	Foo Fighters		990	850	4,590	2,540	7,130

=== Episode 13: 2nd semi-final ===
Producer points
	Yun S.	J. Hahn	Yun J.	Lee S.	Kim J.
Lucy	980	980	970	950	980
Hoppipolla	900	990	940	950	910
Purple Rain	940	980	940	900	930
Moné	970	960	940	940	930
Aftermoon	900	880	960	920	930
People on the Bridge	920	950	880	900	930

Ep.	#	Team	Members	Song title	Original performer	Video	H. P.	L. P.	Prod. P.	V. P.	Total
13.	1	People on the Bridge	Lee Chan-sol, Gang Gyeong-yun, Kim Jun-hyeop, Kim Hyeong-u, Im Hyeong-bin	Find You Again	own composition		950	880	4,580	2,120	6,700
13.	2	Moné	Zai.ro, Kim Woo-sung, Benji, Hong Isaac, Hwang Min-jae	Wooing (우잉)	own composition		970	930	4,740	2,660	7,400
13.	3	Aftermoon	Kevin Oh, DPOLE, Lee Jong-hun, Choi Yong-jin	Before Sunrise	own composition		960	880	4,590	2,170	6,760
13.	4	Lucy	Lee Ju-hyeok, Sin Gwang-il, Sin Ye-chan, Jo Won-sang	Snooze (선잠)	own composition		980	950	4,860	2,360	7,220
13.	5	Purple Rain	Yang Ji-wan, Kim Ha-jin, Lee Na-u, Jeong Gwang-hyeon, Chae Bo-hun	Never Enough	The Greatest Showman OST		980	900	4,690	2,550	7,240
13.	6	Hoppipolla	I'll, Kim Yeong-so, Ha Hyun-sang, Hong Jin-ho	Wake Me Up	Avicii		990	900	4,690	2,730	7,420

Results after semi-finals
Ranking	Team	Points	Pass
1	Lucy	14,680	Yes
2	Hoppipolla	14,670	Yes
3	Purple Rain	14,580	Yes
4	Moné	14 440	Yes
5	Aftermoon	13,840	No
6	People on the Bridge	13,830	No

=== Episode 14: Final ===
Finals were broadcast live and viewers could vote for each team via text message.

Ep.	#	Team	Members	Song title	Original performer	Video	Online pre-vote	Text message voting
14.	1	Purple Rain	Yang Ji-wan, Kim Ha-jin, Lee Na-u, Jeong Gwang-hyeon, Chae Bo-hun	Old And Wise	The Alan Parsons Project		1,974 points	22,498 points
14.	2	Hoppipolla	I'll, Kim Yeong-so, Ha Hyun-sang, Hong Jin-ho	One More Light	Linkin Park		2,958 points	30,711 points
14.	3	Moné	Zai.ro, Kim Woo-sung, Benji, Hong Isaac, Hwang Min-jae	idc (i don't care)	own composition		1,844 points	22,172 points
14.	4	Lucy	Lee Ju-hyeok, Sin Gwang-il, Sin Ye-chan, Jo Won-sang	Flare	own composition		1,562 points	24,682 points

Final results
Ranking	Team	Total points
1	Hoppipolla	48,339
2	Lucy	40,924
3	Purple Rain	39,052
4	Moné	38,456

== Reception ==
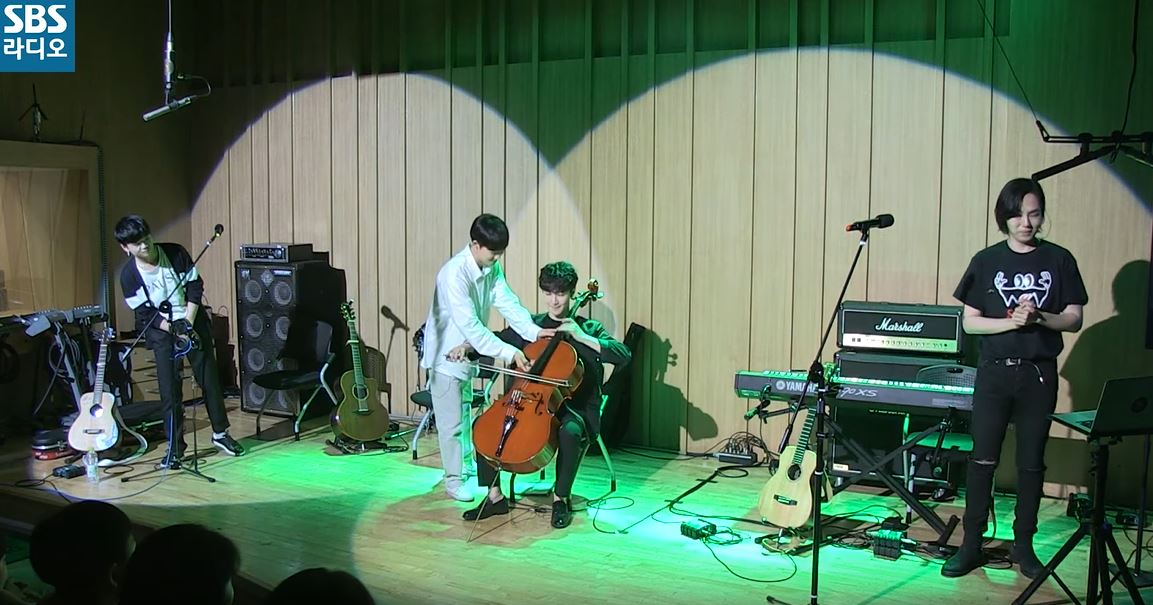
Winning team Hoppipolla

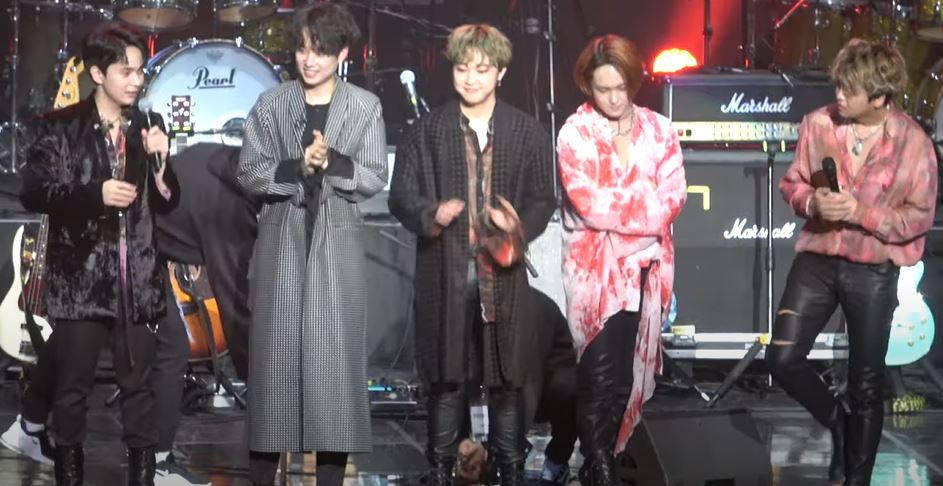
3rd place finalist Purple Rain

The program was generally well received by viewers, it got positive notes for not limiting genres, thus enabling the creation of a variety of ad-hoc bands. It was also highlighted that the show gave indie musicians a chance to shine, as they generally get less opportunities on television than popular Korean idols or trot singers. The show had an average viewership of around 3%, which is considered good for pay cable channels in South Korea.

On the other hand, the show received criticism that the production team decided to only accept male musicians and this was also a criterion in the call for participation. The background of this decision may have been the assumption that most viewers (and thus consumers) are women, and therefore the production aimed to create a male "superband". During the marketing, however, there was no mention of the show being male-only, only the creation of a band was highlighted, thus the original intention could be misinterpreted as if a band naturally could only be made up of men. The show enlisted only one woman, Lee Su-hyun of duo Akdong Musician, who was a member of the jury. Her role, however, was not well-perceived. Money Today noted that the very young singer (20 years old at the time) was much younger than other members of the jury, and had much less experience as an artist, as well. She was criticized for failing to judge participants' musicality or talent and rather show cutesy moves and praise their external appearances, as if representing female fans. The author of the article suggested that a more experienced female musician like Kim Yoon-ah of Jaurim fame could have been a better choice.

The show was also criticized for heavily relying on judges' decisions and only allowing viewers to choose at the end of the run.

=== Viewership ratings ===
Ep.	Original broadcast date	Average audience share (AGB Nielsen)
1	12 April 2019	2.1%
2	19 April 2019	2.0%
3	26 April 2019	1.8%
4	3 May 2019	2.0%
5	10 May 2019	2.4%
6	17 May 2019	2.6%
7	24 May 2019	3.0%
8	31 May 2019	3.0%
9	7 June 2019	2.7%
10	14 June 2019	3.2%
11	21 June 2019	3.5%
12	28 June 2019	3.5%
13	5 July 2019	3.7%
14	12 July 2019	3.6%

== Aftermath ==
The winner of the show, Hoppipolla signed with Dreamus Company and their first single was released in November 2019, titled "About Time". Second-place Lucy signed with Mystic Story of Yoon Jong-shin and released a single titled "Flowering" (Gaehwa, 개화) in May 2020. The original singer during the show re-joined his previous band Gift, and Lucy chose a new singer, Choi Sang-yeop (who was eliminated during the first round). Third-place finalist Purple Rain signed a contract with JTBC Studio and their single "The King Must Die" came out in February 2020.
