= Purple Rain (band) =

South Korean rock band

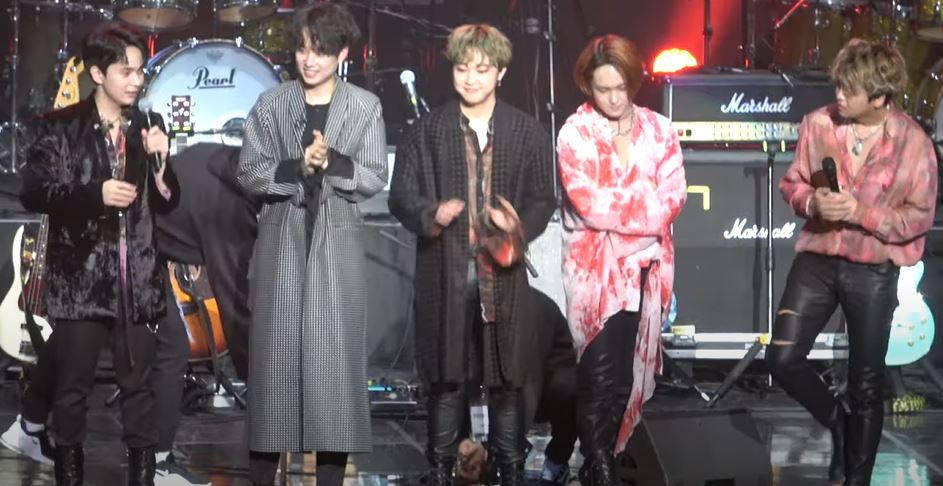

Background information
- Origin: South Korea
- Genres: Rock
- Years active: 2019–2020
- Label: JTBC Studio
- Members: Chae Bo-hun Yang Jiwan Kim Hajin Lee Na-woo Jeong Gwanghyeon
- Website: www.facebook.com/officialpurplerain

Purple Rain (Korean: 퍼플레인) was a South Korean rock band, formed during JTBC's television talent show titled Superband in 2019. The band finished in the third place in the competition and signed with JTBC Studio on 24 October, 2019. They released a single in February 2020, titled "The King Must Die". The band's vocalist, Chae Bohun is also the vocalist and guitarist of alternative rock band The VANE. The band appeared in Immortal Songs: Singing the Legend several times, winning the trophy for the best performance of the night twice. They contributed a song to the soundtrack of the Korean television series My Country: The New Age.

On October 19, 2020, JTBC Studios announced the band had disbanded after officially concluding activities on the 14th. Chae Bo Hoon, Yang Ji Wan, Kim Ha Jin, and Jeong Gwang Hyun would return to their respective agencies while Nau Lee would continue under JTBC after signing an exclusive contract with them.

== Members ==
- Chae Bohun (채보훈) - vocals
- Yang Jiwan (양지완) - guitar
- Kim Hajin (김하진) - bass guitar
- Lee Na-woo (이나우) - piano/keyboards
- Jeong Gwang-hyeon (정광현) - drums

== Discography ==
=== Studio albums ===
Title	Album details	Peak chart positions	Sales
Title	Album details	KOR	Sales
Wanderer Fantasy	Released: August 26, 2020; Label: Dreamus; Format: CD, digital download	36	KOR: 1,755

=== Extended plays ===
Title	Album details	Peak chart positions	Sales
Title	Album details	KOR	Sales
Op.01 (작품번호 1번)	Released: June 23, 2020; Label: Dreamus; Format: CD, Digital download	41	KOR: 1,537

Singles

- "The King Must Die" (28 February, 2020)
- "Letter" (August 13, 2020)

Soundtrack

- "Bird" (My Country: The New Age OST; 8 November, 2019)

== Television appearances ==
Date	Channel	Show title	Notes
April 12 – July 12, 2019	JTBC	Superband	3rd place
March 28, 2020	KBS2	Immortal Songs: Singing the Legend	Winner of the night
April 18, 2020	KBS2	Immortal Songs: Singing the Legend	Winner of the night
May 2, 2020	KBS2	Immortal Songs: Singing the Legend	
June 13, 2020	KBS2	Immortal Songs: Singing the Legend	
