= I'll (singer) =

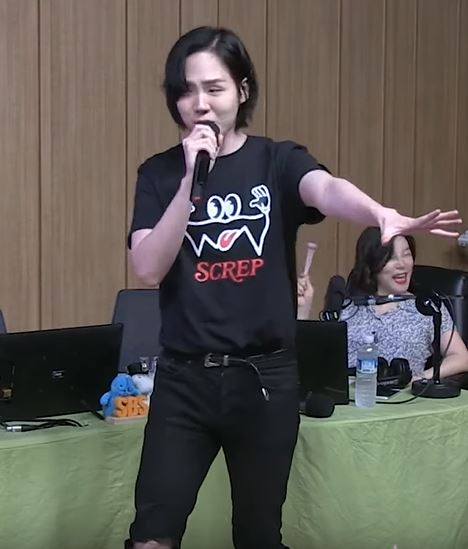
- I'll performing with Hoppipolla on SBS Radio in 2019

Background information
- Born: No Jeong-hun; November 13, 1994 (age 31)
- Occupations: Singer; songwriter
- Instruments: Vocals; keyboards
- Years active: 2017–present
- Labels: MJ Dreamsys; CHXXTA
- Website: mjdreamsys.co.kr/html/dh/artist/5

Korean name
- Hangul: 노정훈
- RR: No Jeonghun
- MR: No Chŏnghun

No Jeong-hun (Korean: 노정훈, born November 13, 1994), better known by his stage name I'll (아일) is a South Korean singer and songwriter who debuted in 2017. Besides his solo work, he is also the front man of Hoppipolla (호피폴라), a band that won a television talent show called Superband (슈퍼밴드) on JTBC in 2019.

== Life and career ==
I'll was born in 1994. He is the younger brother of singer-actor No Min-woo. He double majored in jazz piano and composition at the Boston Berklee College of Music.

He debuted as a solo singer-songwriter in 2017 with the single album Maybe We Are, produced and arranged by his brother. The album also entered the Oricon charts. His second single album, titled Last Winter (그 해 겨울) was released in 2018, and featured singer Juniel.

He also contributed to the original soundtrack of the television drama Partners for Justice 2, with a song called "Poison", written and produced by his brother. In October 2019, he performed the soundtrack "Breaking Dawn" for the television series Vagabond.

In 2020, I'll contributed to the original soundtrack of the tvN South Korean television series Oh My Baby.

== Discography ==
=== Extended plays ===
List of extended plays, with selected details, chart positions, and sales
Title	Details	Peak chart positions	Sales
Title	Details	KOR	Sales
KIWI Mixtape	Release: December 15, 2021; tracklisting: 1. Liar (입만 열면 거짓말); 2. Just Another Winter Song (그냥 겨울 노래); 3. Animal Instinct (연어 본능); 4. Where Were You (너의 집은 건대); 5. Grace; 6. Your room (Stripped)	—	—
Medlar Mixtape	Release: November 1, 2023; Format : CD; tracklisting: 1. One More; 2. No One; 3. Don't Wanna Fall; 4. Someday; 5. Worst (feat. THAMA); 6. Ghost; 7. 24 (CD Only)	—	—
CHeRRY Mixtape	Release: November 11, 2024; Format : CD; tracklisting: 1. Wish; 2. These Days; 3. The Love Has Faded; 4. Is It Over For Real?; 5. Still The Same; 6. Novice Driver	67	KOR: 2,324

=== Single albums ===
List of single albums, with selected details, chart positions, and sales
Title	Details	Peak	Sales
Are You There	Release: November 1, 2017; tracklisting: 1. Are You There	—	—
Maybe We Are	Release: November 22, 2017; tracklisting: 1. Are You There; 2. I Don't Want U Back; 3. My Love, I Still	—	—
Last Winter (그 해 겨울)	Release: January 1, 2018; tracklisting: 1. Last Winter (feat. Juniel)	—	—
To My Dear	Release: March 14, 2018; tracklisting: 1. Shining Love; 2. To My Dear; 3. Last Winter (Solo ver.)	—	—
You & I (너와 내가)	Release: March 17, 2020; tracklisting: 1. You & I 2. You & I (Instrumental)	—	—
Liar	Release: November 23, 2021; tracklisting: 1. Liar	—	—
Just Another Winter Song	Release: December 3, 2021; tracklisting: 1. Just Another Winter Song	—	—
A lonely song	Release: May 26, 2022; tracklisting: 1. A lonely song 2. A lonely song (Instrumental)	—	—
Hate December	Release: December 1, 2023; tracklisting: 1. Hate December	—	—

=== Singles ===
List of singles, with selected chart positions, showing year released and album name
Title	Year	Peak	Album
Title	Year	KOR	Album
"Are You There"	2017	—	Are You There
"Last Winter" (그 해 겨울)	2018	—	Last Winter
"To My Dear"	2018	—	To My Dear
"You & I" (너와 내가)	2020	—	You & I
"Liar"	2021	— (Note: "Liar" did not chart on Circle Digital Chart but peaked at number 197 on the Download Chart.)	Liar
"Just Another Winter Song"	2021	—	Just Another Winter Song
"A lonely song" (외롭송)	2022	—	A lonely song
"Hate December" (12월)	2023	—	Hate December

=== Original soundtracks ===
List of singles, with selected chart positions, showing year released and album name
Title	Year	Peak	Album
Title	Year	KOR	Album
"Poison"	2019	— (Note: "Poison" did not chart on Circle Digital Chart but peaked at number 163 on the BGM Chart.)	Partners for Justice 2 OST Part.3
"Breaking Dawn"	2019	— (Note: "Breaking Dawn" did not chart on Circle Digital Chart but peaked at number 51 on the BGM Chart.)	Vagabond OST Part.3
"Love is all around"	2020	— (Note: "Love is all around" did not chart on Circle Digital Chart but peaked at number 78 on the BGM Chart.)	Oh My Baby OST Part.1
"Be ok"	2020	— (Note: "Be Ok" did not chart on Circle Digital Chart but peaked at number 105 on the BGM Chart.)	Zombie Detective OST Part.1
"Complicated"	2022	—	May It Please the Court OST

=== Collaborations ===
List of collaborations, with selected chart positions, showing year released and album name
Title	Year	Peak	Album
Title	Year	KOR	Album
"So Long" (Thama featuring I'll)	2021	—	Don't Die Colors
(집시 여인) (No Min-woo, I'll, Oh Se-in)	2022	—	DNA Singer - Fantastic Family Round 4
"Strom" (No Min-woo, I'll, Oh Se-in)	2022	—	DNA Singer - Fantastic Family Round 9
"My Little Universe" (나의 작은 우주) (Mellow Kitchen featuring I'll)	2023	—	My Little Universe
"So Long" (Mic Swg featuring Thama and I'll)	2023	—	Mic Swg Booth (with Thama)

== Filmography ==
=== TV drama ===
Year	Title	Role	Notes	Ref.
2023	The Forbidden Marriage	Ban Ran-tan's subordinate	Cameo	

=== TV shows ===
Year	Title	Notes	Ref.
2020	King of Mask Singer	Contestant as "Yellow Swallowtail" (episode 245–246)	
2020	King of Mask Singer	Panelist (episode 253-254)	
2022	Fantastic Family - DNA Singer	Contestant (episode 7, 16-18) with his brother No Min-woo	

=== Radio ===
Title	Year	Notes	Ref.
I'll Pop Island	2023	Main DJ	
