= My Country: The New Age =

2019 South Korean television series

- Promotional poster
- Hangul: 나의 나라
- Lit.: My Country
- RR: Naui nara
- MR: Naŭi nara
- Genre: Historical; Romance; Melodrama
- Written by: Chae Seung-dae
- Directed by: Kim Jin-won
- Starring: Yang Se-jong; Woo Do-hwan; Kim Seol-hyun; Jang Hyuk
- Music by: Choi Chul-ho; Oh Hye-joo
- Country of origin: South Korea
- Original language: Korean
- No. of episodes: 16

Production
- Executive producer: Oh Hwan-min
- Producers: Park Woo-lam; Kim Ji-woo
- Running time: 70 minutes
- Production companies: Celltrion Entertainment; My Country SPC
- Budget: ₩20 billion

Original release
- Network: JTBC
- Release: October 4 – November 23, 2019

My Country: The New Age (Korean: 나의 나라) is a 2019 South Korean television series starring Yang Se-jong, Woo Do-hwan, Kim Seol-hyun and Jang Hyuk. It aired on JTBC from October 4 to November 23, 2019, every Friday and Saturday at 22:50 (KST). It is also available for streaming on Netflix in selected regions.

== Synopsis ==
During the transitional period between the end of the Goryeo dynasty and the beginning of the Joseon dynasty, two friends become enemies following a misunderstanding. They try to protect their country, and the people they love, their own way.

== Cast ==
=== Main ===
- Yang Se-jong as Seo Hwi
  - Moon Woo-jin as young Seo Hwi

A warrior who is the son of a famous swordsman who was framed and put to death.

- Woo Do-hwan as Nam Seon-ho
  - Kim Kang-hoon as young Nam Seon-ho

An ambitious military officer who is the illegitimate son of a high-ranking official.

- Kim Seol-hyun as Han Hee-jae
  - Uhm Seo-hyun as young Han Hee-jae

An intelligent and outspoken woman raised by kisaeng in Ihwaru.

- Jang Hyuk as Yi Bang-won
  - Ji Eun-sung as young Yi Bang-won

A prince who helps his father overthrow the Goryeo dynasty but is not recognized for his contributions.

=== Supporting ===
==== People in the Palace ====
- Kim Yeong-cheol as Yi Seong-gye, Yi Bang-won's father
- Ahn Nae-sang as Nam Jeon, Nam Seon-ho's father
- Park Ye-jin as Queen Sindeok, Yi Seong-gye's second wife
- Lee Hyun-kyun as Yi Bang-gan, Yi Bang-won's elder brother
- Lee Hyo-je as Yi Bang-seok, Yi Seong-gye and Queen Sindeok's second son
  - Kim Min-ho as young Yi Bang-seok

==== People around Seo Hwi ====
- Yu Oh-seong as Seo Geom, Seo Hwi's father
- Cho Yi-hyun as Seo Yeon, Seo Hwi's sister
  - Park So-yi as young Seo Yeon
- Ji Seung-hyun as Park Chi-do, lieutenant who used to work under Seo Geom
- Lee Yoo-joon as Jeong Beom, soldier who fought alongside Seo Hwi in the army
- Shim Wan-joon as Ggae-kku
- In Gyo-jin as Park Moon-bok, soldier who worked as a medic in the army

==== People in Ihwaru ====
- Jang Young-nam as Seo Seol, owner of Ihwaru
- Hong Ji-yoon as Hwa-wol, kisaeng who worked in Ihwaru
- Kim Dae-gon as Kang-kae
- Jang Do-ha as Gyeol, security guard of Ihwaru

==== Others ====
- Choi Go as Lee Bang-beon
- Kim Seo-kyung as Cheon-ga, Lee Bang-won's subordinate
- Kim Jae-young as Tae Ryeong, Lee Bang-won's subordinate
- Kim Dong-won as Hwang Sung-rok, an ex-soldier who is working for Nam Seon-ho

== Original soundtrack ==
My Country: The New Age OST

Soundtrack album by Various artists
- Recorded: 2019
- Genre: Soundtrack
- Languages: Korean; English
- Labels: Celltrion Entertainment; Kakao M

=== Part 1 ===
Released on October 19, 2019
No.	Title	Lyrics	Music	Artist	Length
1.	"Because It's You" (그건 너이니까)	Kwon Young-chan	Kwon Young-chan	Jung Seung-hwan	4:14
2.	"Wild Road"	Kim Jae-hee	Hee Jang-nam, Choi Cheol-ho, Yoo Young-joon	Kim Jae-hee	4:19
3.	"Remember (Feat. Seoho)"	SEAGATE DJ, BlueOcean	Choi Cheol-ho, SEAGATE DJ, BlueOcean, Hee Jang-nam	U-mb5, SEAGATE DJ	3:54
4.	"Because It's You (Inst)"				4:14

=== Part 2 ===
Released on November 2, 2019
No.	Title	Artist	Length
1.	"You are standing on the scene of memory" (기억의 풍경 위에 그대가 서 있다)	Ock Joo-hyun	4:35
2.	"You are standing on the scene of memory (Inst)" (기억의 풍경 위에 그대가 서 있다)		4:35

=== Part 3 ===
Released on November 8, 2019
No.	Title	Artist	Length
1.	"Bird"	Purple Rain	3:24
2.	"Farewell" (이별)	Seoho	5:10
3.	"Bird (Inst)"		3:24
4.	"Farewell (Inst)" (이별)		5:10

Disc 2:
No.	Title	Artist	Length
1.	"Remember Inst ver." (Opening Title)	Various Artists	6:15
2.	"Arrow-head"	Various Artists	4:34
3.	"Battlefield"	Various Artists	4:46
4.	"Dark Walls"	Various Artists	8:12
5.	"Flavour of Life"	Various Artists	3:53
6.	"Garden of God"	Various Artists	8:57
7.	"Lost Castle"	Various Artists	8:32
8.	"Moonbok's Song"	Various Artists	3:20
9.	"My Country"	Various Artists	6:08
10.	"Kingdom"	Various Artists	7:53
11.	"River Flower"	Various Artists	4:38
12.	"Sword of the Stranger"	Various Artists	6:19
13.	"The Warrior"	Various Artists	9:37
14.	"Remember" (SEAGATE DJ Mix)	Various Artists	4:45
Total length:			01:20:35

== Viewership ==
My Country: The New Age : South Korea viewers per episode (thousands)

Season	Episode number																Average
Season	1	2	3	4	5	6	7	8	9	10	11	12	13	14	15	16	Average
1	778	855	818	1044	941	1246	1120	1188	1022	1097	1017	1146	821	973	853	968	993

Source: Audience measurement performed nationwide by Nielsen Media Research.

Average TV viewership ratings
Ep.	Original broadcast date	Average audience share (AGB Nielsen)	
Ep.	Original broadcast date	Nationwide	Seoul
1	October 4, 2019	3.512%	3.777%
2	October 5, 2019	3.846%	3.983%
3	October 11, 2019	3.759%	3.910%
4	October 12, 2019	4.839%	4.999%
5	October 18, 2019	4.209%	4.252%
6	October 19, 2019	4.989%	5.239%
7	October 25, 2019	4.704%	4.662%
8	October 26, 2019	4.873%	5.239%
9	November 1, 2019	4.594%	4.692%
10	November 2, 2019	4.874%	4.483%
11	November 8, 2019	4.412%	4.706%
12	November 9, 2019	4.761%	4.844%
13	November 15, 2019	3.623%	3.837%
14	November 16, 2019	4.283%	4.307%
15	November 22, 2019	3.900%	4.157%
16	November 23, 2019	3.951%	4.032%
Average		4.321%	4.445%
In the table above, the blue numbers represent the lowest ratings and the red numbers represent the highest ratings.; This drama aired on a cable channel/pay TV which normally has a relatively smaller audience compared to free-to-air TV/public broadcasters (KBS, SBS, MBC and EBS).
