= Duet Song Festival =

South Korean television series

- Title card
- Genre: Music
- Directed by: Kang Sung-ah; Jang Seung-min
- Presented by: Sung Si-kyung (Pilot 2, Episodes 1–47); Yoo Se-yoon (Pilot 2, Episodes 1–47); Jun Hyun-moo (Pilot 1); Baek Ji-young (Episodes 1–29)
- Country of origin: South Korea
- Original language: Korean
- No. of seasons: 1
- No. of episodes: 47 + 2 (Pilot)

Production
- Production location: South Korea
- Running time: 90 minutes

Original release
- Network: MBC
- Release: September 25, 2015 (Pilot); February 8, 2016 (Pilot); April 8, 2016 – April 7, 2017

Duet Song Festival (Korean: 듀엣가요제) is a 2016 South Korean television program hosted by Sung Si-kyung and Yoo Se-yoon. It began to air on MBC on Fridays at 21:30 (KST) beginning April 8, 2016. Last episode of season 1 was broadcast on April 7, 2017.

On November 18, 2016 (episode 29), Baek Ji-young announced to leave the show as host due to her pregnancy.

== Format ==
Not including pilot episodes: Seven celebrity artists choose a non-celebrity partner from a selection of people who submit performances to perform a duet of their choice. Each pair is given exactly 4 minutes to perform and earn votes from the 500 live voters in the audience and the celebrity panel. The order is selected by the current first place duo, and with the exception of the pilot episodes, the winner of the previous episode chooses the first performance. The voting results are shown directly on the screen behind the performers, and at the end of all the performances, the duo with the highest vote count is the winner for the episode. The winners are invited back to the show for the next episode, and another duo is chosen for "The Duet You Want To See Again" by the audience to be revived for the next episode as well.

== Panel of celebrity supporters ==
=== 2015–2016 ===
List of celebrity supporters in 2015–2016 (Pilot 1 – Episode 34)

Episode #	Supporters	
Episode #	Fixed/Regular	Guest
Pilot 1	Hong Jin-ho, Heechul (Super Junior), Kwanghee (ZE:A), Shinsadong Tiger	
Pilot 2	Defconn, Yoo Sang-moo	Chae Yeon, Navi
1	Defconn, Yoo Sang-moo, Shin Bo-ra	Hwang Eui-joon, UJi (Bestie), Seungkwan (Seventeen)
2	Defconn, Heo Kyung-hwan, Shin Bo-ra	Hong Jin-young, Twice (Nayeon, Sana)
3	Defconn, Heo Kyung-hwan, Shin Bo-ra	Lady Jane, Fiestar (Jei, Yezi)
4	Heo Kyung-hwan, Shin Bo-ra	Shin Ji (Koyote), Sam Okyere, Cosmic Girls (Cheng Xiao, Exy)
5	Defconn, Heo Kyung-hwan, Shin Bo-ra	Kim Jung-min, UP10TION (Sunyoul, Xiao)
6	Defconn, Heo Kyung-hwan, Shin Bo-ra	Kan Mi-youn, Snuper (Sebin, Suhyun)
7	Defconn, Heo Kyung-hwan, Shin Bo-ra	Lee Ji-hye, Yerin (GFriend), Mijoo (Lovelyz)
8	Defconn, Heo Kyung-hwan, Shin Bo-ra	Tony An, Oh My Girl (YooA, Jiho)
9	Defconn, Yang Se-hyung, Shin Bo-ra	Shin Go-eun, Seventeen (Seungkwan, Jeonghan)
10	Defconn, Yang Se-hyung, Shin Bo-ra	Kim Shin-young, History (Yijeong, Sihyoung)
11	Defconn, Yang Se-hyung, Shin Bo-ra	Brian Joo (Fly to the Sky), Twice (Jihyo, Tzuyu)
12	Defconn, Yang Se-hyung, Shin Bo-ra	Noh Yoo-min (NRG), KNK (Seungjun, Inseong)
13	Defconn, Yang Se-hyung, Shin Bo-ra	DinDin, CLC (Yujin, Seungyeon)
14	Defconn, Yang Se-hyung, Shin Bo-ra	Han Dong-geun, Fiestar (Cao Lu, Hyemi)
15	Defconn, Yang Se-hyung, Shin Bo-ra	Kim Jungmo (Trax), EXID (Hyelin, Jeonghwa)
16	Defconn, Shin Bo-ra	Lee Ji-hye, Han Dong-geun
17	Defconn, Yang Se-hyung, Shin Bo-ra	Seungkwan (Seventeen)
18	Yang Se-hyung, Shin Bo-ra	Kim Sung-soo (Cool), Shim Hyun-bo, Nine Muses (Hyemi, Keumjo)
19	Defconn, Yang Se-hyung, Shin Bo-ra	Sung Dae-hyun (R.ef), Double S 301 (Kim Kyu-jong, Kim Hyung-jun)
20	Defconn, Yang Se-hyung, Shin Bo-ra	Chae Ri-na (Roo'ra/Diva/Girl Friends), Hello Venus (Lime, Yeoreum)
21	Defconn, Yang Se-hyung, Shin Bo-ra	Muzie (UV), Dal Shabet (Subin, Ah Young)
22	Defconn, Yang Se-hyung, Shin Bo-ra	Jung Won-gwan (SoBangCha)
23	Defconn, Shin Bo-ra	Son Hoyoung (g.o.d), Kim Il-joong, Apink (Bomi, Namjoo)
24	Defconn, Shin Bo-ra	Ji Sang-ryeol, Kim Il-joong, Oh My Girl (Jiho, Hyojung)
25	Defconn, Shin Bo-ra	Chun Myung-hoon (NRG), Jo Jung-chi, NU'EST (Baekho, Ren)
26	Defconn, Shin Bo-ra	Alex Chu (Clazziquai), Moon Se-yoon, Secret (Jieun, Hana)
27	Defconn, Shin Bo-ra	Joon Park (g.o.d), Jo Kwon (2AM), Madtown (Jota, Lee Geon)
28	Defconn, Shin Bo-ra	Moon Se-yoon, Hong Yoon-hwa, Matilda (Semmi, Dan-A)
29	Defconn, Shin Bo-ra	Chae Ri-na (Roo'ra/DIVA/Girl Friends), Yoon Hyung-bin, Spica (Kim Boa, Park Sihyun)
30	Defconn, Shin Bo-ra	Park So-hyun, Sam Okyere, Crayon Pop (Ellin, Choa)
31	Defconn, Heo Kyung-hwan, Shin Bo-ra	Hong Yoon-hwa, Snuper (Sangil, Woosung)
32	Defconn, Heo Kyung-hwan, Shin Bo-ra	Kim Hyung-gyu, B.A.P (Daehyun, Youngjae)
33	Defconn, Heo Kyung-hwan, Shin Bo-ra	Kan Mi-youn, BEAT WIN (Sungho, Jeongha)
34	Defconn, Heo Kyung-hwan, Shin Bo-ra	Lee Ji-hye, Oh My Girl (Hyojung, Seunghee)

=== 2017 ===
List of celebrity supporters in 2017 (Episodes 35 – 47)

Episode #	Supporters	
Episode #	Fixed/Regular	Guest
35	Defconn, Heo Kyung-hwan, Shin Bo-ra	Kim Hyung-gyu, Highteen (Eunjin, Seah)
36	Defconn, Heo Kyung-hwan, Shin Bo-ra	Gilgu (Gilgu Bonggu), I.O.I (Jeon So-mi, Kim Chung-ha)
37	Defconn, Heo Kyung-hwan, Shin Bo-ra	Park Sung-kwang, Hello Venus (Nara, Alice)
38	Defconn, Heo Kyung-hwan, Shin Bo-ra	Roo'ra (Chae Ri-na, Kim Ji-hyun)
39	Defconn, Heo Kyung-hwan, Shin Bo-ra	Jung Sung-ho, Choo Dae-yeop
40	Defconn, Heo Kyung-hwan, Shin Bo-ra	Jung Ji-chan, Astro (San-ha, MJ)
41	Defconn, Heo Kyung-hwan, Shin Bo-ra	Nam Chang-hee, NCT (Jaehyun, Johnny)
42	Defconn, Heo Kyung-hwan, Shin Bo-ra	Park Wan-kyu, CLC (Eunbin, Yoojin)
43	Defconn, Heo Kyung-hwan, Shin Bo-ra	Shindong (Super Junior), Sonamoo (Minjae, Nahyun)
44	Defconn, Heo Kyung-hwan, Shin Bo-ra	Oh Na-mi, Victon (Heo Chan, Choi Byung-chan)
45	Defconn, Heo Kyung-hwan, Sleepy (Untouchable)	Hong Ji-min, April (Chaekyung, Naeun)
46	Defconn, Heo Kyung-hwan, Sleepy (Untouchable)	So Chan-whee, Park Wan-kyu, Seo Yu-ri
47	Defconn, Heo Kyung-hwan, Shin Bo-ra	Kim Kyung-ho, VIXX (Ken, Leo)

== List of episodes ==
– Winner
– Duet You Want To See Again

=== 2015–2016 ===
List of episodes in 2015–2016 (Pilot 1 – Episode 34)

Episode	Order	Pair	Score	Song	Original artist
Pilot 1 (Chuseok Special) (September 25, 2015)	1	Kim Nam-joo (Apink) & Kim Shin-kwang	67	Each and Every Night (밤이면 밤마다)	Insooni
Pilot 1 (Chuseok Special) (September 25, 2015)	2	Soyou (Sistar) & Jung Sung-woo	70	Safety (안부)	Byul & Na Yoon-kwon
Pilot 1 (Chuseok Special) (September 25, 2015)	3	Jun Hyo-seong (Secret) & Kim Hyung-soo	64	Honey	Park Jin-young
Pilot 1 (Chuseok Special) (September 25, 2015)	4	Heo Ga-yoon (4Minute) & Kim Soo-bin	73	Eyes, Nose, Lips (눈,코,입)	Taeyang
Pilot 1 (Chuseok Special) (September 25, 2015)	5	Lizzy (After School/Orange Caramel) & Park Hyun-cheol	69	The Man in Yellow Shirt (노란 샤쓰의 사나이)	Han Myung-sook
Pilot 1 (Chuseok Special) (September 25, 2015)	6	Min (Miss A) & Kim Kyung-rae	59	Holding the End of this Night (이 밤의 끝을 잡고)	Solid
Pilot 1 (Chuseok Special) (September 25, 2015)	7	Wheein (Mamamoo) & Jo In-woo	79	Short Hair (단발머리)	Cho Yong-pil
Pilot 1 (Chuseok Special) (September 25, 2015)	8	ChoA (AOA) & Lee Jeong-hwa	77	My Friend (친구여)	Cho PD ft. Insooni
Pilot 2 (Note: Solji and Doo Jin-soo received each a "Duet Micro" gold cup as winner.) (Lunar New Year Special) (February 8, 2016)	Opening	Sung Si-kyung & Yoo Se-yoon	(no score)	Sorry I'm Not Cool (쿨하지 못해 미안해)	UV
Pilot 2 (Lunar New Year Special) (February 8, 2016)	1	Wheein (Mamamoo) & Song Han-hee	453	She Was Pretty (그녀는 예뻤다)	Park Jin-young
Pilot 2 (Lunar New Year Special) (February 8, 2016)	2	Jung Joon-young & Park Sung-mi	401	To You Again (그대 내게 다시)	Byun Jin-sub
Pilot 2 (Lunar New Year Special) (February 8, 2016)	3	Jung Eun-ji (Apink) & Kim Dae-soo	462	I'm a Butterfly (나는 나비)	YB
Pilot 2 (Lunar New Year Special) (February 8, 2016)	4	Min Kyung-hoon (Buzz) & Kim Soo-hyun	429	Confession (고백)	Park Hye-kyung
Pilot 2 (Lunar New Year Special) (February 8, 2016)	5	Zico (Block B) & Lee So-young	466	Go Back (고백)	Dynamic Duo
Pilot 2 (Lunar New Year Special) (February 8, 2016)	6	Solji (EXID) & Doo Jin-soo	477	The Sky in the West (서쪽 하늘)	Lee Seung-chul
Pilot 2 (Lunar New Year Special) (February 8, 2016)	7	Hong Jin-young & Jo Young-yeon	459	Faraway, My Honey (님은 먼 곳에); Storm	Kim Choo-ja; Rumors (루머스)
1 (April 8, 2016)	1	Solar (Mamamoo) & Kim Jung-hwa	421	I'll Show You (보여줄게)	Ailee
1 (April 8, 2016)	2	Baek Ji-young & Choi In-hee	401	My Love by my Side (내 사랑 내 곁에)	Kim Hyun-sik
1 (April 8, 2016)	3	Min Kyung-hoon (Buzz) & Lee Sung-dam	432	Can't We (안되나요)	Wheesung
1 (April 8, 2016)	4	Kang Kyun-Sung (Noel) & Choi Ji-ye	424	Live a Long Long Time (그대가 그대를)	Lee Seung-hwan
1 (April 8, 2016)	5	Jessi & Kim Seok-goo	415	Lies (거짓말)	g.o.d
1 (April 8, 2016)	6	Luna (f(x)) & Goo Hyun-mo	435	For You (너를 위해)	Yim Jae-beom
1 (April 8, 2016)	7	Solji (EXID) & Doo Jin-soo	439	8282	Davichi
2 (April 15, 2016)	1	Eric Nam & Lee Ye-bin	381	Just a Feeling	S.E.S.
2 (April 15, 2016)	2	Jung Eun-ji (Apink) & Kim Byung-kyu	398	To Mother (어머니께)	g.o.d
2 (April 15, 2016)	3	Jo Kwon (2AM) & Park Ri-won	364	Growl (으르렁)	Exo
2 (April 15, 2016)	4	Solji (EXID) & Doo Jin-soo	434	Goodbye for a Moment (잠시만 안녕)	MC the Max
2 (April 15, 2016)	5	Seo In-young & Ha Jin-woo	394	Love ... That Guy (사랑 그 놈)	Bobby Kim
2 (April 15, 2016)	6	Jessi & Kim Seok-goo	428	3!4!	Roo'ra
2 (April 15, 2016)	7	Hyun Jin-young & Jo Han-gyeol	456	Is There Anybody? (누구없소)	Han Young-ae
3 (April 22, 2016)	1	Ra.D & Jang Seon-young	425	Sad Fate (슬픈 인연)	Na-mi
3 (April 22, 2016)	2	Hyun Jin-young & Jo Han-gyeol	417	Left-handed (왼손잡이)	Panic
3 (April 22, 2016)	3	Ailee & Lee Joo-cheon	420	If by Chance (만약에 말야)	Noel
3 (April 22, 2016)	4	Lyn & Kim Min-jeong	429	After This Night (이 밤이 지나면)	Yim Jae-beom
3 (April 22, 2016)	5	Ken (VIXX) & Choi Sang-yeob	427	Never Ending Story	Boohwal
3 (April 22, 2016)	6	Solji (EXID) & Doo Jin-soo	421	Don't Go Don't Go (가지마 가지마)	Brown Eyes
3 (April 22, 2016)	7	Hong Jin-young & Kwon Dae-hyun	404	Before Sadness Comes (슬퍼지려 하기 전에)	Cool
4 (April 29, 2016)	1	Stephanie & Shin Joo-young	389	Swing Baby	Park Jin-young
4 (April 29, 2016)	2	Ken (VIXX) & Choi Sang-yeob	404	In the Rain (빗속에서)	Lee Moon-se
4 (April 29, 2016)	3	Defconn & Jeon Eun-hye	382	Sleepless Rainy Night (잠 못드는 밤 비는 내리고)	Kim Gun-mo
4 (April 29, 2016)	4	Lyn & Kim Min-jeong	377	Belief (믿음)	Lee So-ra
4 (April 29, 2016)	5	Sandeul (B1A4) & Jo Seon-young	410	As I Say	Sagging Snail
4 (April 29, 2016)	6	Jung Joon-young & Lee Roo-ni	366	Insomnia (불면증)	Dynamic Duo ft. Bobby Kim
5 (May 6, 2016)	1	Jun Hyo-seong (Secret) & Kim Yong-hee	352	Girls' Generation (소녀시대)	Lee Seung-chul
5 (May 6, 2016)	2	Younha & Kim Tae-hyung	375	Around Thirty (서른 즈음에)	Kim Kwang-seok
5 (May 6, 2016)	3	Yook Sungjae (BtoB) & Jang Ji-seon	415	Love Rain (사랑비)	Kim Tae-woo
5 (May 6, 2016)	4	Sandeul (B1A4) & Jo Seon-young (Note: Due to busy schedule, Sandeul couldn't attend Episode 6 and would be back on Episode 7. So Ken team and Cho PD team have been chosen to be "Duet You Want To See Again".)	436	Road (길)	g.o.d
5 (May 6, 2016)	5	Ken (VIXX) & Choi Sang-yeob	434	I Want to Fall in Love (사랑에 빠지고 싶다)	Kim Jo-han
5 (May 6, 2016)	6	Cho PD & Jo Hyung-won	408	To You (너에게) & Come Back Home	Seo Taiji and Boys
6 (May 13, 2016)	1	Cho PD & Jo Hyung-won	387	Beauty and the Beast (OK? OK!) (미녀와 야수 (OK? OK!))	DJ Doc
6 (May 13, 2016)	2	Tim & Park Tae-young	414	You In My Arms (그대 내 품에)	Yoo Jae-ha
6 (May 13, 2016)	3	Wendy (Red Velvet) & Kim Jae-goo	349	Things That I Can't Do For You (해줄 수 없는 일)	Park Hyo-shin
6 (May 13, 2016)	4	Ken (VIXX) & Choi Sang-yeob	437	That's Only My World (그것만이 내 세상)	Deulgukhwa
6 (May 13, 2016)	5	Changmin (2AM) & Jeon Geon-ho	429	Don't Forget (잊지 말아요)	Baek Ji-young
6 (May 13, 2016)	6	Lee Ji-hye & Pi Kyung-jin	421	Twinkle	Girls' Generation-TTS
7 (May 20, 2016)	1	Changmin (2AM) & Jeon Geon-ho	404	Meet Him Among Them (그 중에 그대를 만나)	Lee Sun-hee
7 (May 20, 2016)	2	Son Seung-yeon & Jo Ye-in	411	Ugly	2NE1
7 (May 20, 2016)	3	Lee Seok-hoon (SG Wannabe) & Lee So-ri	427	To Me (내게로)	Jang Hye-jin
7 (May 20, 2016)	4	Ken (VIXX) & Choi Sang-yeob	424	Moon of Seoul (서울의 달)	Kim Gun-mo
7 (May 20, 2016)	5	Choi Jung-in & Ahn Byung-min	420	Party	Girls' Generation
7 (May 20, 2016)	6	Sandeul (B1A4) & Jo Seon-young	429	An Essay of Memory (기억의 습작)	Exhibition
8 (May 27, 2016)	1	Niel (Teen Top) & Kim Do-hyun	357	Tic Tac Toe	Buga Kingz
8 (May 27, 2016)	2	Min Kyung-hoon (Buzz) & Lee Eun-bi	409	If (만약에)	Taeyeon
8 (May 27, 2016)	3	Sandeul (B1A4) & Jo Seon-young	423	Butterfly	Loveholics
8 (May 27, 2016)	4	Lee Young-hyun (Big Mama) & Park Joon-hyung	440	The Rhapsody of Rain (비의 랩소디)	Choi Jae-hoon
8 (May 27, 2016)	5	Lee Seok-hoon (SG Wannabe) & Lee So-ri	421	Bus Stop (정류장)	Panic
8 (May 27, 2016)	6	Ra.D & Na Ye-won	436	On the Flower Bed (꽃밭에서)	Jung Hoon-hee
9 (June 3, 2016)	1	ChoA (AOA) & Kim Moo-ah	409	Can't Do (못해)	4Men ft. Mi (美)
9 (June 3, 2016)	2	Sandeul (B1A4) & Jo Seon-young	432	Two People (두 사람)	Sung Si-kyung
9 (June 3, 2016)	3	Lee Young-hyun (Big Mama) & Park Joon-hyung	414	Feeling Only You (너만을 느끼며)	The Blue
9 (June 3, 2016)	4	Yesung (Super Junior) & Jo Eun-soo	413	Don't Say Goodbye (안녕이라고 말하지마)	Lee Seung-chul
9 (June 3, 2016)	5	So Chan-whee & Kim Min-jae	436	Love Over Thousand Years (천년의 사랑)	Park Wan-kyu
9 (June 3, 2016)	6	Alex Chu (Clazziquai) & Park Sung-jin	417	Flying, Deep in the Night (깊은 밤을 날아서)	Lee Moon-se
10 (June 10, 2016)	1	Suho (EXO) & Lee Se-rin	403	What's Wrong (왜 그래)	Kim Hyun-chul
10 (June 10, 2016)	2	Bada & Lee Won-gab	443	Exultation (환희)	Jung Soo-ra
10 (June 10, 2016)	3	Na Yoon-kwon & Kim Min-sang	446	Something Like That (그런 일은)	Hwayobi
10 (June 10, 2016)	4	Yangpa & Park Sung-eun	439	Wild Flower (야생화)	Park Hyo-shin
10 (June 10, 2016)	5	So Chan-whee & Kim Min-jae	439	For Thousand Days (천일동안)	Lee Seung-hwan
10 (June 10, 2016)	6	Sandeul (B1A4) & Jo Seon-young (Note: Due to busy schedule on musical, Sandeul couldn't attend next episode. So in this episode Bada team and Na Yoon-kwon team have been chosen to be "Duet You Want To See Again".)	451	Music Is My Life	Lim Jeong-hee
11 (June 17, 2016)	1	Tei & Yeo Soo-jin	399	It Will Pass (지나간다)	Kim Bum-soo
11 (June 17, 2016)	2	Hyolyn (Sistar) & Lee Na-hyun	408	Sofa	Crush
11 (June 17, 2016)	3	Eddy Kim & Baek Seon-nyeo	384	Scent of You (그대의 향기)	Yoo Young-jin
11 (June 17, 2016)	4	Seungkwan (Seventeen) & Lee Ji-yong	402	How Love Is It (어떻게 사랑이 그래요)	Lee Seung-hwan
11 (June 17, 2016)	5	Na Yoon-kwon & Kim Min-sang	417	I'm Happy (난 행복해)	Lee So-ra
11 (June 17, 2016)	6	Bada & Lee Won-gab	403	Someone's Dream (어떤이의 꿈)	Bom Yeoreum Gaeul Kyeoul
12 (June 24, 2016)	1	Bada & Lee Won-gab	438	Like Being Hit by a Bullet (총 맞은 것처럼)	Baek Ji-young
12 (June 24, 2016)	2	John Park & Ahn Jae-man	429	I Don't Care	2NE1
12 (June 24, 2016)	3	Lim Jeong-hee & Ji Dong-gook	434	Dream (꿈)	Cho Yong-pil
12 (June 24, 2016)	4	Na Yoon-kwon & Kim Min-sang	446	Proposal (청혼)	Noel
12 (June 24, 2016)	5	Song Ji-eun (Secret) & Park Min-gyu	390	Is It Still Beautiful (여전히 아름다운지)	Toy
12 (June 24, 2016)	6	Heo Young-saeng (Double S 301) & Lee Jeong-hyuk	453	Mirotic (주문)	TVXQ
13 (July 1, 2016)	1	John Park & Ahn Jae-man	415	First Impression (첫 인상)	Kim Gun-mo
13 (July 1, 2016)	2	Heo Young-saeng (Double S 301) & Lee Jeong-hyuk	427	Atlantis Princess (아틀란티스 소녀)	BoA
13 (July 1, 2016)	3	Crush & Park Eun-ok	411	The Words of Loving You (사랑한다는 말)	Kim Dong-ryool
13 (July 1, 2016)	4	Rap Monster (BTS) & Kuwahara Yuiko	406	Umbrella (우산)	Epik High ft. Younha
13 (July 1, 2016)	5	Na Yoon-kwon & Kim Min-sang	432	Father (아버지)	Insooni
13 (July 1, 2016)	6	Kim Yoon-ah (Jaurim) & Chae Bo-hoon	443	If You	Big Bang
14 (July 8, 2016)	1	Heo Young-saeng (Double S 301) & Lee Jeong-hyuk	407	Perfect Man	Shinhwa
14 (July 8, 2016)	2	Yuju (GFriend) & Joo Beom-jin	367	See-through (씨스루)	Primary ft. Gaeko ft. Zion.T
14 (July 8, 2016)	3	Kim Feel & Shin Hae-won	432	Hug Me (안아줘)	Jung Joon-il
14 (July 8, 2016)	4	Kim Yoon-ah (Jaurim) & Chae Bo-hoon	435	Turn On the Radio Loudly (크게 라디오를 켜고)	Sinawe
14 (July 8, 2016)	5	Crush & Park Eun-ok	419	Farewell Taxi (이별택시)	Kim Yeon-woo
14 (July 8, 2016)	6	Kim Sung-kyu (Infinite) & Kwon Seon-young	402	Although I Loved You (사랑했지만)	Kim Kwang-seok
15 (July 15, 2016)	1	Kim Feel & Shin Hae-won	421	I Need a Girl	Taeyang
15 (July 15, 2016)	2	Heo Young-saeng (Double S 301) & Lee Jeong-hyuk	392	Breathe (한숨)	Lee Hi
15 (July 15, 2016)	3	Baek A-yeon & Park Soon-ho	349	Please (제발)	Lee So-ra
15 (July 15, 2016)	4	Choi Jung-in & Choi Hyo-in	432	You Are Tearful (그대는 눈물겹다)	MC the Max
15 (July 15, 2016)	5	Kim Kyung-ho & Han Byung-ho	431	Don't Touch Me (손대지마)	Ailee
15 (July 15, 2016)	6	Kim Yoon-ah (Jaurim) & Chae Bo-hoon	441	Love on its Solitude (사랑 그 쓸쓸함에 대하여)	Yang Hee-eun
16–17 (July 22, 2016) (July 29, 2016) ("King of Kings" Special)	Part 1 (Episode 16)				
16–17 (July 22, 2016) (July 29, 2016) ("King of Kings" Special)	1	Lee Young-hyun (Big Mama) & Park Joon-hyung	413	Change	Jo Jang-hyuk
16–17 (July 22, 2016) (July 29, 2016) ("King of Kings" Special)	2	Na Yoon-kwon & Kim Min-sang	406	How Are You (어떤가요)	Lee Jeong-bong
16–17 (July 22, 2016) (July 29, 2016) ("King of Kings" Special)	3	Hyun Jin-young & Jo Han-gyeol	439	Side Road (골목길)	Shinchon Blues
16–17 (July 22, 2016) (July 29, 2016) ("King of Kings" Special)	4	Solji (EXID) & Doo Jin-soo	402	In Summer (여름 안에서)	Deux
16–17 (July 22, 2016) (July 29, 2016) ("King of Kings" Special)	5	Ken (VIXX) & Choi Sang-yeob	429	Like Rain, Like Music (비처럼 음악처럼)	Kim Hyun-sik
16–17 (July 22, 2016) (July 29, 2016) ("King of Kings" Special)	6	Sandeul (B1A4) & Jo Seon-young	436	Do You Want To Walk With Me (같이 걸을까)	Lee Juck
16–17 (July 22, 2016) (July 29, 2016) ("King of Kings" Special)	7	So Chan-whee & Kim Min-jae	412	Abracadabra	Brown Eyed Girls
16–17 (July 22, 2016) (July 29, 2016) ("King of Kings" Special)	Part 2 (Episode 17) (Note: The scores were counted from the results of the previous episode.) (Note: Sandeul and Jo Seon-young received each a "Duet Micro" gold cup as winner after their 5th win and left the show as the principal contestants.)				
16–17 (July 22, 2016) (July 29, 2016) ("King of Kings" Special)	Opening	Sung Si-kyung & Baek Ji-young	(no score)	That Woman (그 여자)	Baek Ji-young
16–17 (July 22, 2016) (July 29, 2016) ("King of Kings" Special)	1	So Chan-whee & Kim Min-jae	822	As We Live (살다가)	SG Wannabe
16–17 (July 22, 2016) (July 29, 2016) ("King of Kings" Special)	2	Sandeul (B1A4) & Jo Seon-young	854	Malri Flower (말리꽃)	Lee Seung-chul
16–17 (July 22, 2016) (July 29, 2016) ("King of Kings" Special)	3	Ken (VIXX) & Choi Sang-yeob	850	Don't Go Today (오늘은 가지마)	Im Se-joon
16–17 (July 22, 2016) (July 29, 2016) ("King of Kings" Special)	4	Solji (EXID) & Doo Jin-soo	843	I Miss You (그리워 그리워)	Noel
16–17 (July 22, 2016) (July 29, 2016) ("King of Kings" Special)	5	Hyun Jin-young & Jo Han-gyeol	849	U	Super Junior
16–17 (July 22, 2016) (July 29, 2016) ("King of Kings" Special)	6	Na Yoon-kwon & Kim Min-sang	842	Smiling Angel (미소천사)	Sung Si-kyung
16–17 (July 22, 2016) (July 29, 2016) ("King of Kings" Special)	7	Lee Young-hyun (Big Mama) & Park Joon-hyung	851	Run (달리기)	Yoon Sang
18 (August 5, 2016) (Note: Pair of Kim Yoon-ah and Chae Bo-hoon haven't performed on this episode due to Kim Yoon-ah's busy schedule, only Chae Bo-hoon appeared in the audiences and have chosen the first pair to perform. They would return on episode 35.) (Note: This episode didn't have any new singer (except Han Dong-geun), only the old pairs appeared and performed with two "Duet You Want To See Again" pairs of episode 15.)	1	Bada & Lee Won-gab	404	Prince of the Sea (바다의 왕자)	Park Myeong-su
18 (August 5, 2016)	2	Alex Chu (Clazziquai) & Park Sung-jin	396	I'm Thinking About You (널 생각해)	One More Chance
18 (August 5, 2016)	3	Han Dong-geun (Note: Jung-in was replaced by Han Dong-geun beginning this episode because she was pregnant.) & Choi Hyo-in	452	Twenty Five, Twenty One (스물다섯, 스물하나)	Jaurim
18 (August 5, 2016)	4	Defconn & Jeon Eun-hye	434	Eve's Warning (이브의 경고)	Park Mi-kyung
18 (August 5, 2016)	5	Kim Kyung-ho & Han Byung-ho	436	It's Fortunate (다행이다)	Lee Juck
18 (August 5, 2016)	6	Stephanie & Shin Joo-young	414	You're the One (너 뿐이야)	Park Jin-young
18 (August 5, 2016)	7	Ra.D & Jang Seon-young	442	Woman on the Beach (해변의 여인)	Cool
19 (August 26, 2016)	1	Ra.D & Jang Seon-young	402	Short Hair (단발머리)	Cho Yong-pil
19 (August 26, 2016)	2	Kim Kyung-ho & Han Byung-ho	431	Childish Adult (어른아이)	Gummy
19 (August 26, 2016)	3	U Sung-eun & Jung Yoon-don	393	Eat (꺼내 먹어요)	Zion.T
19 (August 26, 2016)	4	Jang Hye-jin & Son Hyo-jin	428	That I Was Once By Your Side (내가 너의 곁에 잠시 살았다는 걸)	Toy
19 (August 26, 2016)	5	Kang Sung-hoon (Sechs Kies) & Jang Ji-hyun	438	Do You Know (아시나요)	Jo Sung-mo
19 (August 26, 2016)	6	Han Dong-geun & Choi Hyo-in	444	Lie Lie Lie (거짓말 거짓말 거짓말)	Lee Juck
20 (September 2, 2016)	1	Kang Sung-hoon (Sechs Kies) & Jang Ji-hyun	402	Lovesick (사랑앓이)	F.T. Island
20 (September 2, 2016)	2	Tei & Lee Seon-mi	413	You Touched My Heart (넌 감동이었어)	Sung Si-kyung
20 (September 2, 2016)	3	U Sung-eun & Jung Yoon-don	390	Although It Is Hateful, Again (미워도 다시 한번)	Vibe
20 (September 2, 2016)	4	Min Kyung-hoon (Buzz) & Kim Do-gyeom	431	Hoot (훗)	Girls' Generation
20 (September 2, 2016)	5	Han Dong-geun & Choi Hyo-in	436	The Wind Blows (바람이 분다)	Lee So-ra
20 (September 2, 2016)	6	Lee Seok-hoon (SG Wannabe) & Kim Chang-soo	434	I Love You Without You (혼자만의 사랑)	Kim Gun-mo
21 (September 9, 2016)	1	Tei & Lee Seon-mi	412	Should I Say I Love You Again? (다시 사랑한다 말할까)	Kim Dong-ryool
21 (September 9, 2016)	2	JeA (Brown Eyed Girls) & Lee Jin-soo	403	The Reason I Became a Singer (가수가 된 이유)	Shin Yong-jae
21 (September 9, 2016)	3	Han Dong-geun & Choi Hyo-in	421	Must Have Been in Love (사랑했나봐)	Yoon Do-hyun
21 (September 9, 2016)	4	Minah (Girl's Day) & Ahn Se-jong	391	A Guy Like Me (나란놈이란)	Im Chang-jung
21 (September 9, 2016)	5	Solar (Mamamoo) & Dong Seon-ho	418	That XX (그XX)	G-Dragon
21 (September 9, 2016)	6	Lee Seok-hoon (SG Wannabe) & Kim Chang-soo	432	If You're Like Me (나와 같다면)	Kim Jang-hoon
22 (Chuseok Special) (September 16, 2016)	1	Kim Wan-sun & Inseong (KNK)	412	Only Look at Me (나만 바라봐)	Taeyang
22 (Chuseok Special) (September 16, 2016)	2	Park Nam-jung & Park Jang-hyun (Vromance)	429	I Heard a Rumor (풍문으로 들었소)	Hahm Joong-ah and the Yankees (함중아와 양키스)
22 (Chuseok Special) (September 16, 2016)	3	Shin Hyo-beom & Bonggu (Gilgu Bonggu)	428	Happy Me (행복한 나를)	ECO
22 (Chuseok Special) (September 16, 2016)	4	Byun Jin-sub & Linzy (Fiestar)	407	Forever With You (그대와 영원히)	Lee Moon-se
22 (Chuseok Special) (September 16, 2016)	5	Kim Jong-seo & Yeoeun (Melody Day)	403	Evergreen Tree (상록수)	Yang Hee-eun
22 (Chuseok Special) (September 16, 2016)	6	Park Mi-kyung & Kim Jin-yong (Big Brain)	420	Forever Friends (영원한 친구)	Na-mi
22 (Chuseok Special) (September 16, 2016)	7	Seol Woon-do & Sunyoul (UP10TION)	428	You and I (그대 그리고 나)	Sorisae (소리새)
23–24 (September 23, 2016) (September 30, 2016)	Round 1 (Episode 23)				
23–24 (September 23, 2016) (September 30, 2016)	1	Lee Seok-hoon (SG Wannabe) & Kim Chang-soo	419	Distant Memories of You (기억속의 먼 그대에게)	Park Mi-kyung
23–24 (September 23, 2016) (September 30, 2016)	2	Park Ji-min (15&) & Jung Young-yoon	393	Um Oh Ah Yeh (음오아예)	Mamamoo
23–24 (September 23, 2016) (September 30, 2016)	3	Seo Eunkwang (BtoB) & Kim Yeon-mi	418	Please Come Back Again (다시 와주라)	Vibe
23–24 (September 23, 2016) (September 30, 2016)	4	Han Dong-geun & Choi Hyo-in	426	I Don't Love You (널 사랑하지 않아)	Urban Zakapa
23–24 (September 23, 2016) (September 30, 2016)	5	Jo Jang-hyuk & Kim Joon-seop	415	Haven't Heard from Her for a While (한동안 뜸했었지)	Love and Peace
23–24 (September 23, 2016) (September 30, 2016)	6	Solar (Mamamoo) & Dong Seon-ho	408	Timeless	Zhang Liyin ft. Xiah
23–24 (September 23, 2016) (September 30, 2016)	7	Son Seung-yeon & Sung Kyung-mo	434	Snail (달팽이)	Panic
23–24 (September 23, 2016) (September 30, 2016)	Round 2 (Episode 24)				
23–24 (September 23, 2016) (September 30, 2016)	Opening	Park Nam-jung & Park Jang-hyun (Vromance)	(no score)	Missing You (널 그리며); Days With Rain (비에 스친 날들)	Park Nam-jung
23–24 (September 23, 2016) (September 30, 2016)	1	Son Seung-yeon & Sung Kyung-mo	849	Love Me Right	EXO
23–24 (September 23, 2016) (September 30, 2016)	2	Solar (Mamamoo) & Dong Seon-ho	819	Romantic Cat (낭만 고양이)	Cherry Filter
23–24 (September 23, 2016) (September 30, 2016)	3	Jo Jang-hyuk & Kim Joon-seop	827	Making Memories (추억 만들기)	Kim Hyun-sik
23–24 (September 23, 2016) (September 30, 2016)	4	Han Dong-geun & Choi Hyo-in	854	Song of the Wind (바람의 노래)	Cho Yong-pil
23–24 (September 23, 2016) (September 30, 2016)	5	Seo Eunkwang (BtoB) & Kim Yeon-mi	840	I Believe	Shin Seung-hun
23–24 (September 23, 2016) (September 30, 2016)	6	Park Ji-min (15&) & Jung Young-yoon	799	D (Half Moon)	DEAN ft. Gaeko
23–24 (September 23, 2016) (September 30, 2016)	7	Lee Seok-hoon (SG Wannabe) & Kim Chang-soo	849	The Covered Up Road (가리워진 길)	Yoo Jae-ha
25–26 (October 14, 2016) (Note: Pair of Son Seung-yeon & Sung Kyung-mo haven't performed on this episode due to Son Seung-yeon's busy schedule.) (October 28, 2016)	Round 1 (Episode 25)				
25–26 (October 14, 2016) (October 28, 2016)	1	Han Dong-geun & Choi Hyo-in	405	Rainy Season (장마)	Choi Jung-in
25–26 (October 14, 2016) (October 28, 2016)	2	Kim Jo-han & Jin Sung-hyuk	403	Love Has Left Again (또 한번 사랑은 가고)	Lee Ki-chan
25–26 (October 14, 2016) (October 28, 2016)	3	Horan (Clazziquai) & Kim Tae-wook	411	Lady at the Cigarette Shop (담배가게 아가씨)	Song Chang-sik
25–26 (October 14, 2016) (October 28, 2016)	4	Jung Dae-hyun (B.A.P) & Jang Hye-soo	372	You're the Best (넌 is 뭔들)	Mamamoo
25–26 (October 14, 2016) (October 28, 2016)	5	K.Will & Boo So-jeong	409	Across the Universe (우주를 건너)	Baek Ye-rin
25–26 (October 14, 2016) (October 28, 2016)	6	Lee Seok-hoon (SG Wannabe) & Kim Chang-soo	418	Thanks (감사)	Kim Dong-ryool
25–26 (October 14, 2016) (October 28, 2016)	7	Ailee & Park Soo-bin	413	Going Crazy (미친거니)	Vibe
25–26 (October 14, 2016) (October 28, 2016)	Round 2 (Episode 26)				
25–26 (October 14, 2016) (October 28, 2016)	Opening	Moon Se-yoon & Shin Bo-ra	(no score)	Twenty Five, Twenty One (스물다섯, 스물하나)	Jaurim
25–26 (October 14, 2016) (October 28, 2016)	1	Ailee & Park Soo-bin	832	Now	Fin.K.L
25–26 (October 14, 2016) (October 28, 2016)	2	Lee Seok-hoon (SG Wannabe) & Kim Chang-soo	831	Fly (날아) (Misaeng OST)	Lee Seung-yeol
25–26 (October 14, 2016) (October 28, 2016)	3	K.Will & Boo So-jeong	817	Because I Love You (사랑하기 때문에)	Yoo Jae-ha
25–26 (October 14, 2016) (October 28, 2016)	4	Jung Dae-hyun (B.A.P) & Jang Hye-soo	762	Beautiful Goodbye (아름다운 이별)	Kim Gun-mo
25–26 (October 14, 2016) (October 28, 2016)	5	Horan (Clazziquai) & Kim Tae-wook	814	One Love Forgotten with Another Love (사랑이 다른 사랑으로 잊혀지네)	Hareem
25–26 (October 14, 2016) (October 28, 2016)	6	Kim Jo-han & Jin Sung-hyuk	849	Bounce	Cho Yong-pil
25–26 (October 14, 2016) (October 28, 2016)	7	Han Dong-geun & Choi Hyo-in	844	In the Dream (꿈에)	Lena Park
27–28 (November 4, 2016) (November 11, 2016)	Round 1 (Episode 27)				
27–28 (November 4, 2016) (November 11, 2016)	1	Johan Kim & Jin Sung-hyuk	404	This Song (이 노래)	2AM
27–28 (November 4, 2016) (November 11, 2016)	2	Cho Kyuhyun (Super Junior) & Lee Eun-seok	401	If It Is You (너였다면) (Another Miss Oh OST)	Jung Seung-hwan
27–28 (November 4, 2016) (November 11, 2016)	3	Jo Hyun-ah (Urban Zakapa) & Kim Eun-ah	412	Highway Romance (고속도로 Romance)	Yoon Jong-shin
27–28 (November 4, 2016) (November 11, 2016)	4	Jun. K (2PM) & Lee Eui-jeong	401	Friday Night	g.o.d
27–28 (November 4, 2016) (November 11, 2016)	5	Han Dong-geun & Choi Hyo-in	417	One Late Night in 1994 (1994년 어느 늦은 밤)	Jang Hye-jin
27–28 (November 4, 2016) (November 11, 2016)	6	Son Seung-yeon & Sung Kyung-mo	414	Lost Child (미아)	Lena Park
27–28 (November 4, 2016) (November 11, 2016)	7	Huh Gak & Seo Chang-hoon	410	Desire (소원)	Ji Young-seon (지영선)
27–28 (November 4, 2016) (November 11, 2016)	Round 2 (Episode 28) (Note: Han Dong-geun and Choi Hyo-in received each a "Duet Micro" gold cup as winner after their 5th win and left the show as the principal contestants.)				
27–28 (November 4, 2016) (November 11, 2016)	Opening	Sandeul (B1A4) & Ken (VIXX)	(no score)	Hui Jae (희재)	Sung Si-kyung
27–28 (November 4, 2016) (November 11, 2016)	1	Huh Gak & Seo Chang-hoon	829	Peppermint Candy (박하사탕)	YB
27–28 (November 4, 2016) (November 11, 2016)	2	Son Seung-yeon & Sung Kyung-mo	835	The One Who Gives Me Happiness (행복을 주는 사람)	Sunflower
27–28 (November 4, 2016) (November 11, 2016)	3	Han Dong-geun & Choi Hyo-in	853	Memory of the Wind (바람기억)	Naul
27–28 (November 4, 2016) (November 11, 2016)	4	Jun. K (2PM) & Lee Eui-jeong	798	To You Who Don't Love Me Anymore (나를 사랑하지 않는 그대에게)	Lee So-ra
27–28 (November 4, 2016) (November 11, 2016)	5	Jo Hyun-ah (Urban Zakapa) & Kim Eun-ah	836	Resignation (체념)	Big Mama
27–28 (November 4, 2016) (November 11, 2016)	6	Cho Kyuhyun (Super Junior) & Lee Eun-seok	830	If It Was Me (나였으면)	Na Yoon-kwon
27–28 (November 4, 2016) (November 11, 2016)	7	Johan Kim & Jin Sung-hyuk	850	Like The First Feeling (처음 그 느낌처럼)	Shin Seung-hun
29–30 (November 18, 2016) (November 25, 2016)	Round 1 (Episode 29) (Note: Choi Hyo-in (Han Dong-geun's duet partner) appeared in the audience and chose the first duet to perform.)				
29–30 (November 18, 2016) (November 25, 2016)	1	Kang Min-kyung (Davichi) & Kim Min-ho	403	One's Way Back (귀로)	Park Seon-joo
29–30 (November 18, 2016) (November 25, 2016)	2	Jo Hyun-ah (Urban Zakapa) & Kim Eun-ah	396	Spring Summer Autumn Winter (봄여름가을겨울)	Bom Yeoreum Gaeul Kyeoul
29–30 (November 18, 2016) (November 25, 2016)	3	Babylon (베이빌론) & Bang Seung-ji	406	Candy (갠디)	H.O.T.
29–30 (November 18, 2016) (November 25, 2016)	4	Leo (VIXX) & Jung Young-eun	399	Words I'd Want to Say (하고 싶은 말)	Kim Tae-woo
29–30 (November 18, 2016) (November 25, 2016)	5	Johan Kim & Jin Sung-hyuk	422	I Miss You (보고싶다)	Kim Bum-soo
29–30 (November 18, 2016) (November 25, 2016)	6	Wheesung & Ahn Soo-min	427	Honey	Park Jin-young
29–30 (November 18, 2016) (November 25, 2016)	7	Kim Tae-woo (g.o.d) & Choo Sang-min	412	I Didn't Know That Time (그땐 미처 알지 못했지)	Lee Juck
29–30 (November 18, 2016) (November 25, 2016)	Round 2 (Episode 30)				
29–30 (November 18, 2016) (November 25, 2016)	Opening	Kim Kyung-ho & Kwon Hyuk-soo	(no score)	Love Has Gone (사랑했지만)	Kim Kwang-seok
29–30 (November 18, 2016) (November 25, 2016)	1	Kim Tae-woo (g.o.d) & Choo Sang-min	834	Beautiful Night (아름다운 밤이야)	BEAST
29–30 (November 18, 2016) (November 25, 2016)	2	Wheesung & Ahn Soo-min	836	Shining (샤이닝)	Jaurim
29–30 (November 18, 2016) (November 25, 2016)	3	Johan Kim & Jin Sung-hyuk	854	Kiss Me	Park Jin-young
29–30 (November 18, 2016) (November 25, 2016)	4	Leo (VIXX) & Jung Young-eun	812	Eyes, Nose, Lips (눈,코,입)	Taeyang
29–30 (November 18, 2016) (November 25, 2016)	5	Babylon & Bang Seung-ji	809	Haru Haru (하루하루)	Tashannie (타샤니)
29–30 (November 18, 2016) (November 25, 2016)	6	Jo Hyun-ah (Urban Zakapa) & Kim Eun-ah	822	365 Days (365일)	Ali
29–30 (November 18, 2016) (November 25, 2016)	7	Kang Min-kyung (Davichi) & Kim Min-ho	810	Don't Leave by My Side (내 곁에서 떠나가지 말아요)	The Light and Salt
31–32 (December 2, 2016) (December 9, 2016)	Round 1 (Episode 31)				
31–32 (December 2, 2016) (December 9, 2016)	1	Johan Kim & Jin Sung-hyuk	398	A Goose's Dream (거위의 꿈)	Carnival
31–32 (December 2, 2016) (December 9, 2016)	2	Hwayobi & Lee Pil-ho	386	I'm in Love	Ra.D
31–32 (December 2, 2016) (December 9, 2016)	3	Taeil (Block B) & Nam Taek-rim	392	Polaris (북극성)	Kangta
31–32 (December 2, 2016) (December 9, 2016)	4	Wheesung & Ahn Soo-min	419	Yanghwa Bridge (양화대교)	Zion.T
31–32 (December 2, 2016) (December 9, 2016)	5	Kim Boa (SPICA) & Maria Jose	408	Mr.Mr.	Girls' Generation
31–32 (December 2, 2016) (December 9, 2016)	6	Ock Joo-hyun & Choi Dong-joo	415	Now I Don't Know (지금은 알 수 없어)	Kim Jong-seo
31–32 (December 2, 2016) (December 9, 2016)	7	Bonggu (Gilgu Bonggu) & Kwon Se-eun	435	Love Is (사랑이란)	Yoon Sang
31–32 (December 2, 2016) (December 9, 2016)	Round 2 (Episode 32)				
31–32 (December 2, 2016) (December 9, 2016)	Opening	Kim Yeon-woo & Han Dong-geun	(no score)	After This Night (이 밤이 지나면)	Yim Jae-beom
31–32 (December 2, 2016) (December 9, 2016)	1	Bonggu (Gilgu Bonggu) & Kwon Se-eun	876	A Night Like Tonight (오늘같은 밤이면)	Park Jeong-woon
31–32 (December 2, 2016) (December 9, 2016)	2	Ock Joo-hyun & Choi Dong-joo	840	Remaining (미련)	Kim Gun-mo
31–32 (December 2, 2016) (December 9, 2016)	3	Kim Boa (SPICA) & Maria Jose	816	But I'm Sorry (버담소리)	Kim Gun-mo
31–32 (December 2, 2016) (December 9, 2016)	4	Wheesung & Ahn Soo-min	875	1,2,3,4	Lee Hi
31–32 (December 2, 2016) (December 9, 2016)	5	Taeil (Block B) & Nam Taek-rim	807	One Man (한 남자)	Kim Jong-kook
31–32 (December 2, 2016) (December 9, 2016)	6	Hwayobi & Lee Pil-ho	808	Man and Woman (남과 여)	Park Seon-joo ft. Kim Bum-soo
31–32 (December 2, 2016) (December 9, 2016)	7	Johan Kim & Jin Sung-hyuk	853	The Downfall of Moon (달의 몰락)	Kim Hyun-chul
33–34 (December 16, 2016) (December 23, 2016)	Round 1 (Episode 33)				
33–34 (December 16, 2016) (December 23, 2016)	1	Bonggu (Gilgu Bonggu) & Kwon Se-eun	413	It Was Just in Love (사랑일뿐야)	Kim Min-woo
33–34 (December 16, 2016) (December 23, 2016)	2	Hani (EXID) & Chae Chang-wook	369	Cheap Coffee (싸구려 커피)	Kiha & The Faces
33–34 (December 16, 2016) (December 23, 2016)	3	Muzie & Park Hyun-joo	406	You're My First and Last (넌 나의 처음이자 마지막이야)	Solid
33–34 (December 16, 2016) (December 23, 2016)	4	KCM & Yoo Da-mi	419	Fix My Makeup (화장을 고치고)	Wax
33–34 (December 16, 2016) (December 23, 2016)	5	Solbi & Lee Hyun-gook	411	My Friend (친구여)	Cho PD ft. Insooni
33–34 (December 16, 2016) (December 23, 2016)	6	Wheesung & Ahn Soo-min	422	Galaxy (우주를 줄게)	Bolbbalgan4
33–34 (December 16, 2016) (December 23, 2016)	7	Kim Hyun-jung & Jang Han-mong	411	TT	Twice
33–34 (December 16, 2016) (December 23, 2016)	Round 2 (Episode 34)				
33–34 (December 16, 2016) (December 23, 2016)	Opening	Seol Woon-do & Seunghee (Oh My Girl)	(no score)	White Christmas	—
33–34 (December 16, 2016) (December 23, 2016)	1	Kim Hyun-jung & Jang Han-mong	808	Run Across The Sky (하늘을 달리다)	Lee Juck
33–34 (December 16, 2016) (December 23, 2016)	2	Wheesung & Ahn Soo-min	833	You In My Faded Memories (흐린 기억속의 그대)	Hyun Jin-young
33–34 (December 16, 2016) (December 23, 2016)	3	Solbi & Lee Hyun-gook	817	Jazz Cafe (재즈 카페)	Shin Hae-chul
33–34 (December 16, 2016) (December 23, 2016)	4	KCM & Yoo Da-mi	838	Let Me Say Goodbye	Bobby Kim
33–34 (December 16, 2016) (December 23, 2016)	5	Muzie & Park Hyun-joo	821	Yeosu Night Sea (여수 밤바다)	Busker Busker
33–34 (December 16, 2016) (December 23, 2016)	6	Hani (EXID) & Chae Chang-wook	777	Deviation (일탈)	Jaurim
33–34 (December 16, 2016) (December 23, 2016)	7	Bonggu (Gilgu Bonggu) & Kwon Se-eun	855	Spring Past (봄날은 간다)	Kim Yoon-ah

=== 2017 ===
List of episodes in 2017 (Episodes 35 – 47)

Episode	Order	Pair	Score	Song	Original artist
35–36 (January 6, 2017) (January 13, 2017)	Round 1 (Episode 35)				
35–36 (January 6, 2017) (January 13, 2017)	1	Bonggu (Gilgu Bonggu) & Kwon Se-eun	414	Stop Now (이제 그만)	Lee So-ra
35–36 (January 6, 2017) (January 13, 2017)	2	Jo Gyu-chan & Seo Mi-so	417	I'll Give You Everything (다 줄거야)	Jo Gyu-man (조규만)
35–36 (January 6, 2017) (January 13, 2017)	3	Jang Jae-in & Yoo Jin-hyuk	410	Time Walking on Memory (기억을 걷는 시간)	Nell
35–36 (January 6, 2017) (January 13, 2017)	4	Kim Yoon-ah (Jaurim) & Chae Bo-hoon	435	Stand Up (일어나)	Kim Kwang-seok
35–36 (January 6, 2017) (January 13, 2017)	5	Wheein (Mamamoo) & Park Hee-joo	425	Day Day	BewhY ft. Jay Park
35–36 (January 6, 2017) (January 13, 2017)	6	Hyolyn (Sistar) & Jo Yong-woo	427	Farewell (잘가요)	Jung Jae-wook
35–36 (January 6, 2017) (January 13, 2017)	7	KCM & Yoo Da-mi	433	One Million Roses (백만송이 장미)	Sim Soo-bong
35–36 (January 6, 2017) (January 13, 2017)	Round 2 (Episode 36)				
35–36 (January 6, 2017) (January 13, 2017)	Opening	Doo Jin-soo (Note: Solji's ex-duet partner) & Choi Hyo-in (Note: Han Dong-geun's ex-duet partner)	(no score)	I Don't Love You (널 사랑하지 않아)	Urban Zakapa
35–36 (January 6, 2017) (January 13, 2017)	Opening	Doo Jin-soo & Choi Hyo-in	(no score)	The Sky in the West (서쪽 하늘)	Lee Seung-chul
35–36 (January 6, 2017) (January 13, 2017)	1	KCM & Yoo Da-mi	849	The Magic Castle (마법의 성)	The Classic
35–36 (January 6, 2017) (January 13, 2017)	2	Hyolyn (Sistar) & Jo Yong-woo	838	Butterfly	BTS
35–36 (January 6, 2017) (January 13, 2017)	3	Wheein (Mamamoo) & Park Hee-joo	856	Please Forget Me (날 그만 잊어요)	Gummy
35–36 (January 6, 2017) (January 13, 2017)	4	Kim Yoon-ah (Jaurim) & Chae Bo-hoon	862	Snow Flower (눈의 꽃)	Park Hyo-shin
35–36 (January 6, 2017) (January 13, 2017)	5	Jang Jae-in & Yoo Jin-hyuk	826	Rain	Lee Juck
35–36 (January 6, 2017) (January 13, 2017)	6	Jo Gyu-chan & Seo Mi-so	842	Just Like a Dream (꿈처럼) (Another Miss Oh's OST)	Ben
35–36 (January 6, 2017) (January 13, 2017)	7	Bonggu (Gilgu Bonggu) & Kwon Se-eun	861	Crush (짝사랑)	Gigs
37 (January 20, 2017)	Round 1 (Episode 37)				
37 (January 20, 2017)	1	Kim Yoon-ah (Jaurim) & Chae Bo-hoon	429	Please (제발)	Deulgukhwa
37 (January 20, 2017)	2	Jung Seung-hwan & Jeon Sung-hyun	418	The Day Long Ago (오래전 그날)	Yoon Jong-shin
37 (January 20, 2017)	3	Lyn & Kim In-hye	438	Don't Be Happy (행복하지 말아요)	MC the Max
37 (January 20, 2017)	4	Cheetah & Kang Dong-won	410	Loser	Big Bang
37 (January 20, 2017)	5	Bonggu (Gilgu Bonggu) & Kwon Se-eun	434	Uphill Road (오르막길)	Yoon Jong-shin ft. Choi Jung-in
37 (January 20, 2017)	6	Lim Seul-ong (2AM) & Jung Hye-rin	408	Playing with Fire (불장난)	Blackpink
37 (January 20, 2017)	7	Kim Yeon-ji (SeeYa) & Ye Mi-ni	436	Good Person (좋은사람)	Park Hyo-shin
38–39 (January 27, 2017) (February 3, 2017) (Seollal Special)	Round 1 (Episode 38)				
38–39 (January 27, 2017) (February 3, 2017) (Seollal Special)	1	Park Wan-kyu & Kim Ju-na	428	Lonely Night	Boohwal
38–39 (January 27, 2017) (February 3, 2017) (Seollal Special)	2	Yoon Min-soo (Vibe) & Im Se-joon	445	Drinking (술이야)	Vibe
38–39 (January 27, 2017) (February 3, 2017) (Seollal Special)	3	Shin Hyo-beom & Sungjin (Day6)	412	I Love You (난 널 사랑해)	Shin Hyo-beom
38–39 (January 27, 2017) (February 3, 2017) (Seollal Special)	4	Kim Do-hyang & Ahn Shin-ae (The Barberettes)	463	Lived Like a Fool (바보처럼 살았군요)	Kim Do-hyang
38–39 (January 27, 2017) (February 3, 2017) (Seollal Special)	5	So Chan-whee & Yang Da-il	443	Tears	So Chan-whee
38–39 (January 27, 2017) (February 3, 2017) (Seollal Special)	6	The One & Nam Joo-hee (Chic)	465	My Woman (내여자)	The One
38–39 (January 27, 2017) (February 3, 2017) (Seollal Special)	7	Lee Young-hyun (Big Mama) & UJi (Bestie)	460	Resignation (체념)	Lee Young-hyun
38–39 (January 27, 2017) (February 3, 2017) (Seollal Special)	Round 2 (Episode 39)				
38–39 (January 27, 2017) (February 3, 2017) (Seollal Special)	Opening	Jung Sung-ho & Choo Dae-yeop	(no score)	The Flight (비상)	Yim Jae-beom
38–39 (January 27, 2017) (February 3, 2017) (Seollal Special)	1	Lee Young-hyun (Big Mama) & UJi (Bestie)	891	The Love That I Committed (내가 저지른 사랑)	Im Chang-jung
38–39 (January 27, 2017) (February 3, 2017) (Seollal Special)	2	The One & Nam Joo-hee (Chic)	905	You Are My Everything	Gummy
38–39 (January 27, 2017) (February 3, 2017) (Seollal Special)	3	So Chan-whee & Yang Da-il	876	Last Concert (마지막 콘서트)	Lee Seung-chul
38–39 (January 27, 2017) (February 3, 2017) (Seollal Special)	4	Kim Do-hyang & Ahn Shin-ae (The Barberettes)	912	Sad Fate (슬픈 인연)	Na-mi
38–39 (January 27, 2017) (February 3, 2017) (Seollal Special)	5	Shin Hyo-beom & Sungjin (Day6)	828	For Her (그녈 위해)	JK Kim Dong-wook
38–39 (January 27, 2017) (February 3, 2017) (Seollal Special)	6	Yoon Min-soo (Vibe) & Im Se-joon	905	Lie Lie Lie (거짓말 거짓말 거짓말)	Lee Juck
38–39 (January 27, 2017) (February 3, 2017) (Seollal Special)	7	Park Wan-kyu & Kim Ju-na	881	Confession (고해)	Yim Jae-beom
40 (February 10, 2017)	Round 2 (Episode 40, continue of episode 37) (Note: After the 5th win, Kim Yoon-ah and Chae Bo-hoon left the show as the principal contestants. The audience selected two pairs as "Duet You Want To See Again" for the next episodes.)				
40 (February 10, 2017)	Opening	Kai & Jung Seon-ah (정선아)	(no score)	All I Ask of You (Korean version)	Musical The Phantom of the Opera OST
40 (February 10, 2017)	1	Kim Yeon-ji (SeeYa) & Ye Mi-ni	862	To You Know My Pain (내 아픔 아시는 당신께)	Jo Ha-moon
40 (February 10, 2017)	2	Lim Seul-ong (2AM) & Jung Hye-rin	818	Baby Baby	4Men
40 (February 10, 2017)	3	Bonggu (Gilgu Bonggu) & Kwon Se-eun	869	I Love You (난 널 사랑해)	Shin Hyo-beom
40 (February 10, 2017)	4	Cheetah & Kang Dong-won	833	Mom (엄마)	Ra.D
40 (February 10, 2017)	5	Lyn & Kim In-hye	866	One Sided Love (혼자하는 사랑)	Ann
40 (February 10, 2017)	6	Jung Seung-hwan & Jeon Sung-hyun	838	The Sea in My Old Draw (내 낡은 서랍 속의 바다)	Panic
40 (February 10, 2017)	7	Kim Yoon-ah (Jaurim) & Chae Bo-hoon	881	Last Dance	BIGBANG
41–42 (February 17, 2017) (February 24, 2017)	Round 1 (Episode 41) (Note: Kim Yoon-ah's ex-duet partner Chae Bo-hoon appeared in the audiences and have chosen the first pair to perform.)				
41–42 (February 17, 2017) (February 24, 2017)	1	Lyn & Kim In-hye	422	Come Back Home	2NE1
41–42 (February 17, 2017) (February 24, 2017)	2	Kim Myung-hoon (Ulala Session) & Yang Hee-jin	418	Diary of Mother (엄마의 일기)	Wax
41–42 (February 17, 2017) (February 24, 2017)	3	Park Ki-young & Park Ye-eum	428	Dreams Come True	S.E.S.
41–42 (February 17, 2017) (February 24, 2017)	4	Lee Soo-hyun (Akdong Musician) & Yang Ji-na	411	Only One	BoA
41–42 (February 17, 2017) (February 24, 2017)	5	Kim Feel & Kim Ye-jin	439	Recede (멀어지다)	Nell
41–42 (February 17, 2017) (February 24, 2017)	6	Bonggu (Gilgu Bonggu) & Kwon Se-eun	435	Freshwater Eel's Dream (민물장어의 꿈)	Shin Hae-chul
41–42 (February 17, 2017) (February 24, 2017)	7	Baek Chung-kang & Park Seo-woo	423	Love, Never Fade (사랑, 결코 시들지 않는...)	Seomoon Tak
41–42 (February 17, 2017) (February 24, 2017)	Round 2 (Episode 42)				
41–42 (February 17, 2017) (February 24, 2017)	Opening	Kim Do-hyang & Ahn Shin-ae (The Barberettes)	(no score)	A 60's Couple's Story	Kim Kwang-seok
41–42 (February 17, 2017) (February 24, 2017)	1	Baek Chung-kang & Park Seo-woo	818	When Flowering Spring Comes (꽃피는 봄이 오면)	BMK
41–42 (February 17, 2017) (February 24, 2017)	2	Bonggu (Gilgu Bonggu) & Kwon Se-eun	853	The Pierrot Laughs at Us (삐에로는 우릴 보고 웃지)	Kim Wan-sun
41–42 (February 17, 2017) (February 24, 2017)	3	Kim Feel & Kim Ye-jin	861	Love Love Love (사랑 사랑 사랑)	Kim Hyun-sik
41–42 (February 17, 2017) (February 24, 2017)	4	Lee Soo-hyun (Akdong Musician) & Yang Ji-na	837	Piano Man	Mamamoo
41–42 (February 17, 2017) (February 24, 2017)	5	Park Ki-young & Park Ye-eum	860	Don't Worry (걱정 말아요 그대)	Jeon In-kwon
41–42 (February 17, 2017) (February 24, 2017)	6	Kim Myung-hoon (Ulala Session) & Yang Hee-jin	833	Just a Feeling	S.E.S.
41–42 (February 17, 2017) (February 24, 2017)	7	Lyn & Kim In-hye	869	The Fool (이 바보야)	Jung Seung-hwan
43–44 (March 3, 2017) (March 17, 2017)	Round 1 (Episode 43)				
43–44 (March 3, 2017) (March 17, 2017)	1	Lyn & Kim In-hye	417	Fate (인연)	Lee Sun-hee
43–44 (March 3, 2017) (March 17, 2017)	2	Sleepy (Untouchable) & Kim Dong-young	421	Only My Friend (나만의 친구)	Solid
43–44 (March 3, 2017) (March 17, 2017)	3	Lee Chang-sub (BtoB) & Park Soo-jin	391	Beautiful	Crush
43–44 (March 3, 2017) (March 17, 2017)	4	Kei (Lovelyz) & Hwang Se-young	410	I	Taeyeon ft. Verbal Jint
43–44 (March 3, 2017) (March 17, 2017)	5	Yook Joong-wan (Rose Motel) & Lee Joo-hyuk	442	A Thorn Tree (가시나무)	Poet & Town Chief
43–44 (March 3, 2017) (March 17, 2017)	6	Bonggu (Gilgu Bonggu) & Kwon Se-eun	415	Sick and Sick Name (아프고 아픈 이름...)	Ann
43–44 (March 3, 2017) (March 17, 2017)	7	Park Hye-kyung & Lee Jeong-seok	428	Aspirin (아스피린)	Girl (걸)
43–44 (March 3, 2017) (March 17, 2017)	Round 2 (Episode 44)				
43–44 (March 3, 2017) (March 17, 2017)	Opening	Heo Kyung-hwan & Oh Na-mi	(no score)	All for You (Seo In-guk & Jung Eun-ji's version)	Cool
43–44 (March 3, 2017) (March 17, 2017)	1	Park Hye-kyung & Lee Jeong-seok	834	Only If I Have You (그대만 있다면)	Loveholics
43–44 (March 3, 2017) (March 17, 2017)	2	Bonggu (Gilgu Bonggu) & Kwon Se-eun	851	Love Actually (들었다 놨다)	Daybreak
43–44 (March 3, 2017) (March 17, 2017)	3	Yook Joong-wan (Rose Motel) & Lee Joo-hyuk	873	One Candle (촛불하나)	g.o.d
43–44 (March 3, 2017) (March 17, 2017)	4	Kei (Lovelyz) & Hwang Se-young	828	If You're Gonna Be Like This (이럴거면)	Ivy
43–44 (March 3, 2017) (March 17, 2017)	5	Lee Chang-sub (BtoB) & Park Soo-jin	793	A Shot of Soju (소주 한 잔)	Im Chang-jung
43–44 (March 3, 2017) (March 17, 2017)	6	Sleepy (Untouchable) & Kim Dong-young	842	To Her Love (그녀의 연인에게)	K2
43–44 (March 3, 2017) (March 17, 2017)	7	Lyn & Kim In-hye	852	I Am a Star (난 별)	Lee So-ra
45–46 (March 24, 2017) (March 31, 2017)	Round 1 (Episode 45)				
45–46 (March 24, 2017) (March 31, 2017)	1	Yook Joong-wan (Rose Motel) & Lee Joo-hyuk	424	A Little Girl (소녀)	Lee Moon-se
45–46 (March 24, 2017) (March 31, 2017)	2	Eric Nam & Park Se-ri	406	Perhaps Love (사랑인가요)	HowL & J
45–46 (March 24, 2017) (March 31, 2017)	3	Jung Eun-ji (Apink) & Yoo Hye-seon	431	Just Friends (친구라는 건)	Park Hyo-shin & Kim Bum-soo
45–46 (March 24, 2017) (March 31, 2017)	4	Tim & Noh Hee-gwan	443	It Would Be Good (좋을텐데)	Sung Si-kyung
45–46 (March 24, 2017) (March 31, 2017)	5	Lee Hong-gi (F.T. Island) & Oh Ye-jin	421	Reason for Waiting (기다리는 이유)	Im Chang-jung
45–46 (March 24, 2017) (March 31, 2017)	6	Lyn & Kim In-hye	423	Miss You... And Miss You (그립고...그리운...)	Park Hyo-shin
45–46 (March 24, 2017) (March 31, 2017)	7	Ahn Shin-ae (The Barberettes) & Jung Jin-cheol	458	By the Moon Lighted Window (달빛 창가에서)	City Boys (도시아이들)
45–46 (March 24, 2017) (March 31, 2017)	Round 2 (Episode 46)				
45–46 (March 24, 2017) (March 31, 2017)	Opening	So Chan-whee & Park Wan-kyu	(no score)	Love over Thousand Years (천년의 사랑)	Park Wan-kyu
45–46 (March 24, 2017) (March 31, 2017)	1	Ahn Shin-ae (The Barberettes) & Jung Jin-cheol	880	Myself Reflected in My Heart (내 마음에 비친 내 모습)	Yoo Jae-ha
45–46 (March 24, 2017) (March 31, 2017)	2	Lyn & Kim In-hye	833	Brown City	Brown Eyed Soul
45–46 (March 24, 2017) (March 31, 2017)	3	Lee Hong-gi (F.T. Island) & Oh Hye-jin	825	Tell Me You Love Me (좋다고 말해)	Bolbbalgan4
45–46 (March 24, 2017) (March 31, 2017)	4	Tim & Noh Hee-gwan	876	My Destiny	Lyn
45–46 (March 24, 2017) (March 31, 2017)	5	Jung Eun-ji (Apink) & Yoo Hye-seon	882	Throw Away (연)	Big Mama
45–46 (March 24, 2017) (March 31, 2017)	6	Eric Nam & Park Se-ri	838	Sometimes (가끔)	Crush
45–46 (March 24, 2017) (March 31, 2017)	7	Yook Joong-wan (Rose Motel) & Lee Joo-hyuk	862	With You (그대랑)	Lee Juck
47 (Note: The first performance team was chosen by a lottery (like the first episodes of the show) of panelist Defconn.) (Note: Han Dong-geun and Choi Hyo-in received each a "Duet Micro" gold cup as the last winner of the show, there is the second time they receive the cup.) (April 7, 2017) (Last Episode)	1	Yook Joong-wan (Rose Motel) & Lee Joo-hyuk	429	Regrets (아쉬움)	Shinchon Blues
47 (April 7, 2017) (Last Episode)	2	Jung Eun-ji (Apink) & Yoo Hye-seon	423	Wind That Blows (그대가 분다)	MC the Max
47 (April 7, 2017) (Last Episode)	3	Heo Young-saeng (Double S 301) & Lee Jeong-hyuk	432	Sherlock·셜록 (Clue+Note)	SHINee
47 (April 7, 2017) (Last Episode)	4	Ahn Shin-ae (The Barberettes) & Jung Jin-cheol	419	Cherry Blossom Ending (벚꽃 엔딩)	Busker Busker
47 (April 7, 2017) (Last Episode)	5	Bonggu (Gilgu Bonggu) & Kwon Se-eun	457	One Flew Over the Cuckoo's Nest (뻐꾸기 둥지 위로 날아간 새)	Kim Gun-mo
47 (April 7, 2017) (Last Episode)	6	Kim Yoon-ah (Jaurim) & Chae Bo-hoon	443	Trouble Maker (ft. Jaurim)	Trouble Maker
47 (April 7, 2017) (Last Episode)	7	Han Dong-geun & Choi Hyo-in	461	Breath (숨)	Park Hyo-shin

== Ratings ==
In the table below, the blue numbers represent the lowest ratings and the red numbers represent the highest ratings.

=== 2015–2016 ===
List of ratings in 2015–2016 (Pilot 1 – Episode 34)

Episode #	Broadcast Date	TNmS Ratings	AGB Ratings
Pilot 1	September 25, 2015	7.7%	7.0%
Pilot 2	February 8, 2016	11.2%	9.8%
1	April 8, 2016	6.2%	7.6%
2	April 15, 2016	6.3%	7.1%
3	April 22, 2016	6.0%	6.3%
4	April 29, 2016	6.6%	8.1%
5	May 6, 2016	7.0%	7.5%
6	May 13, 2016	5.2%	6.2%
7	May 20, 2016	6.2%	7.7%
8	May 27, 2016	7.0%	6.3%
9	June 3, 2016	5.4%	6.6%
10	June 10, 2016	6.5%	6.9%
11	June 17, 2016	5.6%	6.7%
12	June 24, 2016	5.9%	7.1%
13	July 1, 2016	5.4%	6.9%
14	July 8, 2016	5.4%	6.2%
15	July 15, 2016	6.0%	6.7%
16	July 22, 2016	6.5%	6.4%
17	July 29, 2016	6.8%	6.9%
18	August 5, 2016	6.1%	5.6%
19	August 26, 2016	5.3%	6.0%
20	September 2, 2016	6.3%	5.6%
21	September 9, 2016	5.8%	5.2%
22	September 16, 2016	8.2%	9.2%
23	September 23, 2016	6.5%	7.3%
24	September 30, 2016	6.3%	6.8%
25	October 14, 2016	4.3%	5.0%
26	October 28, 2016	5.8%	5.4%
27	November 4, 2016	4.7%	5.7%
28	November 11, 2016	5.3%	5.8%
29	November 18, 2016	5.8%	5.8%
30	November 25, 2016	4.7%	5.9%
31	December 2, 2016	5.1%	5.4%
32	December 9, 2016	5.3%	5.8%
33	December 16, 2016	5.3%	4.9%
34	December 23, 2016	5.2%	5.1%

=== 2017 ===
List of ratings in 2017 (Episodes 35 – 47)

Episode #	Broadcast Date	TNmS Ratings	AGB Ratings
35	January 6, 2017	5.6%	7.1%
36	January 13, 2017	5.7%	6.9%
37	January 20, 2017	5.5%	7.1%
38	January 27, 2017	5.7%	5.9%
39	February 3, 2017	5.8%	6.4%
40	February 10, 2017	4.8%	6.2%
41	February 17, 2017	5.7%	7.0%
42	February 24, 2017	6.2%	7.7%
43	March 3, 2017	5.3%	7.2%
44	March 17, 2017	5.9%	6.2%
45	March 24, 2017	5.8%	6.5%
46	March 31, 2017	5.2%	5.9%
47	April 7, 2017	5.5%	5.7%

== Awards and nominations ==
Year	Award	Category	Recipient	Result
2016	16th MBC Entertainment Awards	Female Excellence Award in Music/Talk Show	Baek Ji-young	Nominated
2016	16th MBC Entertainment Awards	Male Rookie Award in Music/Talk Show	Han Dong-geun	Won
2016	16th MBC Entertainment Awards	MC Award	Baek Ji-young, Sung Si-kyung, Yoo Se-yoon	Won

== International versions ==
– Currently airing
– Ceased to air
– Undetermined

Country/Region	Local title	Network(s)	Broadcast period	Winners	Hosts	Kpop guest
Vietnam	Duet Song Festival Vietnam (Nhạc hội song ca)	HTV7	Season 1: December 25, 2016 – April 17, 2017; Season 2: April 15, 2018 – August 26, 2018	Season 1: Hoàng Bách & Khánh Long; Season 2: Vicky Nhung & Thanh Sang	Current: Ngô Kiến Huy (1–2); Ốc Thanh Vân (2); Former: Lan Phương (1); Mỹ Linh (1)	Yesung (Super Junior) (1); Infinite (1); Samuel (2); Snuper (2); Winner (2)
