= Yuri (singer, born 1976) =

Cha Hyun-ok 차현옥
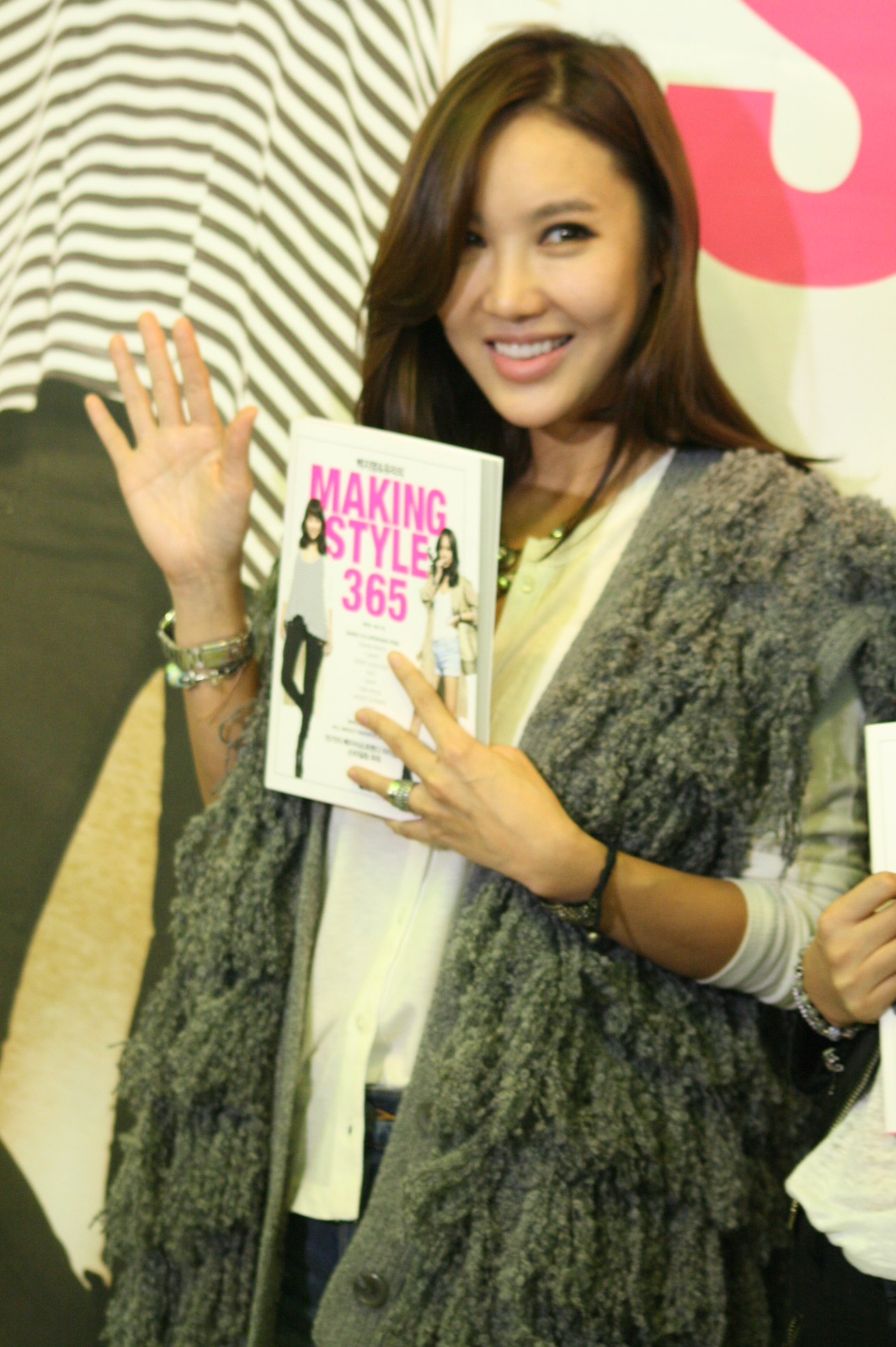
- Yuri in 2011

Background information
- Also known as: Yuri
- Born: Cha Hyun-ok; December 24, 1976 (age 49)
- Origin: South Korea
- Genres: Dance-pop, K-pop
- Occupation: Singer
- Years active: 1995–present
- Labels: KT Music (with Cool); WS Entertainment (solo career)
- Member of: Cool
- Formerly of: Girl Friends

Cha Hyun-ok (Korean: 차현옥; born December 24, 1976), known by her stage name Yuri (Korean: 유리), is a South Korean pop singer. Debuting as a singer with Cool (쿨), she later formed Girl Friends with best friend Chae Ri-na after the former group's breakup in 2005. Yuri has since regrouped with Cool.

== Career ==
Yuri was not an original member of Cool, but was brought in to replace Yoo Chae-yeong for the group's second album. The band's lineup stayed the same from the second album onwards. In 2004, though, Cool was reportedly in danger of breaking up due to tensions within the band. The group eventually broke up after the release of their tenth album in 2005.

A year after the breakup, Yuri announced that she would be joining with close friend Chae Ri-na to become a musical duo, named Girl Friends. Becoming friends in the 1990s while performing with their respective groups, the two had been discussing a possible joint project for 10 years. Girl Friends released their first album, Another Myself, in 2006, with the lead single "Maybe I Love You". Their second album, Addict 2 Times, was released in late 2007.

In 2008, Cool announced that they would be regrouping. Yuri stated that she missed performing their trademark dance songs in the summer, even while still performing as part of Girl Friends. The group then released their 11th album in the summer of 2009.

Yuri has set up an online shopping mall with friend Baek Ji-young.

On October 17, 2012, it was reported that Yuri had been accidentally killed in a fight in Gangnam, Seoul, but this was revealed to be a case of mistaken identity. The real victim was "Ms. Kang", the ex-wife of Yuri's Cool bandmate Kim Sung Soo, who was stabbed to death in a fight in a restaurant where she had been meeting with Roo'ra and Girl Friends singer Chae Ri-na. "Ms. Kang" and Yuri were supposedly very physically similar, causing a misunderstanding as to the identity of the victim.
