= Girl Friends (group) =

2006–2007 South Korean musical duo

- Origin: Korea
- Genres: K-pop, R&B
- Years active: 2006–2007
- Labels: Doremi Media
- Members: Chae Rina, Yuri
- Website: muz.co.kr/girlfriends/

Girl Friends is a K-pop group made up of real-life friends, Yuri and Chae Rina. They released two albums with mixed success; their debut single was "Maybe I Love You."

== History ==
Both Yuri and Chae Rina have previously been part of major Korean pop groups: Yuri in Cool, and Chae in Roo'ra and Diva. They became friends in the 1990s while performing with their respective groups, and discussed doing a joint project for 10 years. When they found time to do so, they debated on various names (including "Yurina") before deciding on "Girl Friends"; afterwards, Chae stated that it felt great to keep their promise and release an album.

Their first album, Another Myself, was released on July 29, 2006. Described as an R&B album, the duo mentioned that it was an album made with no regrets, and they put their best efforts into making a great album. Their first single was "Maybe I Love You." The album sold 8000 copies by the end of August, according to the Music Industry Association of Korea.

Their second album, Addict 2 Times, was released in August 2007. The duo did not make an official comeback performance until October 2007; at the time, they stated that they wanted to win fans with their songs instead of their dances. The album sold 1,777 copies in its month of release; it has not charted since.

== Discography ==
=== Albums ===
- Another Myself July 29, 2006
- Addict 2 Times August 20, 2007
