= Now, Follow Me =

Korean television program

- Hangul: 이젠 날 따라와
- RR: Ijen nal ttarawa
- MR: Ijen nal ttarawa
- Starring: Yoon Min-soo; Yoon Hoo; Lee Jong-hyuk; Lee Joon-soo; Choo Sung-hoon; Choo Sa-rang; Lee Dong-gook; Lee Jae-si
- Country of origin: South Korea
- Original language: Korean
- No. of seasons: 1
- No. of episodes: 8

Production
- Production locations: South Korea; Hawaii
- Production companies: CJ ENM; ZEMMIX C&B; K-HAWAII FILMS

Original release
- Network: tvN STORY tvN
- Release: September 23 – November 18, 2022

Now, Follow Me (Korean: 이젠 날 따라와) is a South Korean reality show program on tvN STORY and tvN simultaneously.

It aired on both tvN STORY and tvN starting from September 23, 2022 on Saturdays at 20:20 (KST).

== Synopsis ==
Four pairs of fathers and children who used to appear on Dad! Where Are We Going? and The Return of Superman, had come back together after some years and go on various trips together. However, this time, rather than the fathers who will be bring the children to various places, it will be the kids' turn. The four kids will be in charge of planning and bringing their fathers for the whole trip together.

== Cast members ==
- Yoon Min-soo, Yoon Hoo
- Lee Jong-hyuk, Lee Joon-soo
- Choo Sung-hoon, Choo Sa-rang
- Lee Dong-gook, Lee Jae-si

== Ratings ==
List of ratings (episode 1–present)
- Ratings listed below are the individual corner ratings of Now, Follow Me. (Note: Individual corner ratings do not include commercial time, which regular ratings include.)
- In the ratings below, the highest rating for the show will be in red and the lowest rating for the show will be in blue each year.

Ep. #	Original Airdate	AGB Nielsen Ratings
Ep. #	Nationwide	
1	September 23, 2022	1.962%
2	September 30, 2022	1.772%
3	October 7, 2022	1.239%
4	October 14, 2022	1.230%
5	October 21, 2022	0.279%
