= Shin Bo-ra =

South Korean comedian, actress and singer

Shin Bora
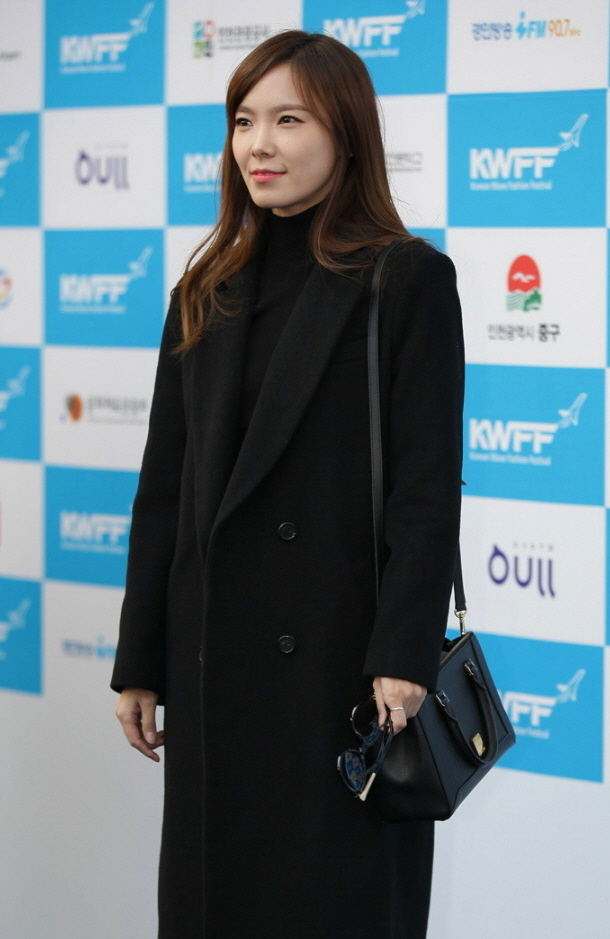
- Shin in 2015
- Born: March 17, 1987 (age 39); Geoje, South Korea
- Employer: YMC Entertainment

Comedy career
- Years active: 2010–present
- Medium: Stand-up, television
- Genres: Observational, Sketch, Wit, Parody, Slapstick, Dramatic, Sitcom

Korean name
- Hangul: 신보라
- Hanja: 申寶羅
- RR: Sin Bora
- MR: Sin Pora

Shin Bora (Korean: 신보라; born March 17, 1987) is a South Korean comedian, singer, and actress. She made her entertainment debut as a comedian on the variety show Gag Concert in 2010. Shin is also a member of the band Brave Guys, and has released several singles as a solo artist. In 2014, she was cast in a supporting role in the television drama Trot Lovers.

== Personal life ==
In June 2019, Shin married her non-celebrity boyfriend of the same age. In July 2021, Shin announced her pregnancy and is due to give birth in the fall.

== Filmography ==
=== Television shows ===
Year	Title	Network	Notes/Ref.
2010–2014	Gag Concert	KBS2	Cast member
2010	Happy Sunday - Qualifications of Men	KBS2	Cast member
2012	Happy Together 3	KBS2	Guest (Episodes 241, 248, 256)
2012	Win Win	KBS2	Guest
2013	You Hee-yeol's Sketchbook	KBS2	Guest (with Brave Guys)
2013	Mamma Mia	KBS2	Guest
2013	Four Sons and One Daughter	MBC	Guest
2013	Hidden Singer	JTBC	Guest
2013	Weekly Idol	MBC Every 1	Guest
2013	Happy Together 3	KBS2	Guest (Episode 311)
2013	Hello Counselor	KBS2	Guest
2013	The Human Condition	KBS2	Guest (Female Comedian Special)
2014	Immortal Songs 2	KBS2	Guest performer (with Ailee)
2014	Exo 90:2014	Mnet	Guest (with Lyn)
2014	Star Junior Show	SBS	Guest
2014	The Human Condition	KBS2	Guest (Talent Sharing, Living On A Shoestring Budget)
2014	Magic Eye	SBS	Guest
2014	Vitamin	KBS2	Guest
2014	Hello Counselor	KBS2	Guest
2015	Finding Delicious TV	MBC	Host
2015	Three Wheels	MBC	Guest
2015	King of Mask Singer	MBC	Contestant (Pilot)
2015	Human Documentary	MBC	Guest
2015	My Young Tutor	MBC	Guest
2016–2017	Duet Song Festival	MBC	Regular panelist
2016	With You	JTBC	Guest (ep 58, 59)
2017	King of Mask Singer	MBC	Contestant (Episode 109)

=== Drama ===
Year	Title	Role	Network
2011	KBS Drama Special: "Guardian Angel Kim Young-gu"	Cameo appearance	KBS2
2011	Spy Myung-wol	Cameo appearance	KBS2
2012	Family	Cameo appearance	KBS2
2013	Marry Him If You Dare	Cameo appearance	KBS2
2014	Lovers of Music	Na Pil-nyeo (Supporting cast)	KBS2
2014	KBS Drama Special: "Bride in Sneakers"	Mijeong (Main cast)	KBS2

=== Film ===
Year	Title	Role	Notes
2010	Animals United	Giselle	voice, Korean language dub
2012	Delhi Safari	Giselle	voice, Korean language dub
2012	Kaiketsu Zorori: da da da daiboken!	Arius	voice, Korean language dub

=== Music video appearances ===
Year	Song title	Artist
2013	"Miss Right"	Teen Top
2014	"Age-height"	Two Song Place
2014	"Boy Jump"	Baechigi

== Discography ==
=== Brave Guys ===
Year	Title	Peak chart positions	Sales	Album
Year	Title	KOR	Sales	Album
2012	"Brave Snow White"	—	—	Snow White and the Huntsman Korean OST
2012	"닥치고 패밀리 (Shut Up Family)"	75	KOR (DL): 57,662+	Family OST
2012	"기다려 그리고 준비해 (Wait And Get Ready)"	5	KOR (DL): 980,231+	A to Z
2012	"I 돈 Care (I Don't Care)" (feat. PD Seo Su-min)	2	KOR (DL): 1,347,136+	A to Z
2012	"봄 여름 여름 여름 (Spring Summer Summer Summer)"	9	KOR (DL): 645,795+	A to Z
2012	"멀어진다 (Drift Apart)"	57	KOR (DL): 146,867+	A to Z
2012	"자꾸만 (Again)"	30	KOR (DL): 171,794+	A to Z
2012	"할말은 한다 (Say What I Need to Say)"	—	—	A to Z
2012	"Party People"	—	—	A to Z
2012	"흔한 이별 (Typical Breakup)"	—	—	A to Z
2012	"2012"	—	—	A to Z
2012	"거짓말 (Lie)" (feat. Airplane)	—	—	A to Z
"—" denotes releases that did not chart or were not released in that region.

=== Solo artist ===
Year	Title	Peak chart positions	Sales	Album
Year	Title	KOR	Sales	Album
2012	"Crying With Longing"	10	KOR (DL): 818,811+	Phantom OST
2012	"This Love"	64	KOR (DL): 112,632+	track from This Love Part 2
2013	"Because It's Love"	18	KOR (DL): 455,485+	All About My Romance OST with Baechigi
2013	"Frozen"	21	KOR (DL): 142,885+	First Single Album 꽁꽁
2015	"Mis-Match"	31	KOR (DL): 107,108+	Second Single Album

== Commercials ==
- 2011 - Grape Day ambassador
- 2011 - KFC Garlic Chicken
- 2011 - Philips Air Fryer
- 2011 - S-Oil Ad (With An Il Kwon)
- 2012 - Forest Service Ambassador
- 2012 - LG U + LTE Mobile Advertising
- 2012 - Hyundai Santa Fe
- 2012 - KTB Investment & Radio Advertising
- 2012 - Daiso CM, Dong-A Otsuka me is Prio Inc
- 2012 - Richaem
- 2012 - Ambassador of No More School Violence (with other gag Concert members)
- 2012 - Samsung Life
- 2012 - LG U + 002
- 2012 - Convenience Courier
- 2012 - World One Day (Phil Leo)
- 2013 - Korea Railroad Corporation (With Ailee)
- 2013 - Magic Pang (with Kim Giri)

== Gag Concert segments ==
- "Superstar KBS" (2010–2011)
- "EBS Drama" (2010)
- "9시쯤 뉴스" (2010–2011)
- "Discoveries of Life" (2011–2013)
- "Brave Guys" (2012–2013)
- "Geojedo" (as Bosuk) (2013)
- "Bboom Entertainment" (2013–2014)
- "Legends of Legends" (as Shin Pulip) (2013–2014)

== Accolades ==
=== Awards and nominations ===
Year	Award	Category	Nominated work	Result
2011	KBS Entertainment Awards	Excellence Award in Comedy – Female	Gag Concert	Won
2011	12th Korea Visual Arts Festival	Photogenic Award, Gag category	Gag Concert	Won
2012	KBS Entertainment Awards	Top Excellence Award in Comedy – Female	Gag Concert	Won
2012	KBS Entertainment Awards	Top Excellence Idea Award (Brave Guys)	Gag Concert	Won
2013	49th Baeksang Arts Awards	Best Variety Performer – Female	Gag Concert	Won
2013	40th Korea Broadcasting Awards	Best Comedian	Gag Concert	Won

=== Listicles ===
Name of publisher, year listed, name of listicle, and placement
Publisher	Year	Listicle	Placement	Ref.
Forbes	2013	Korea Power Celebrity	27th	
