= Han Dong-geun =

South Korean singer (born 1993)

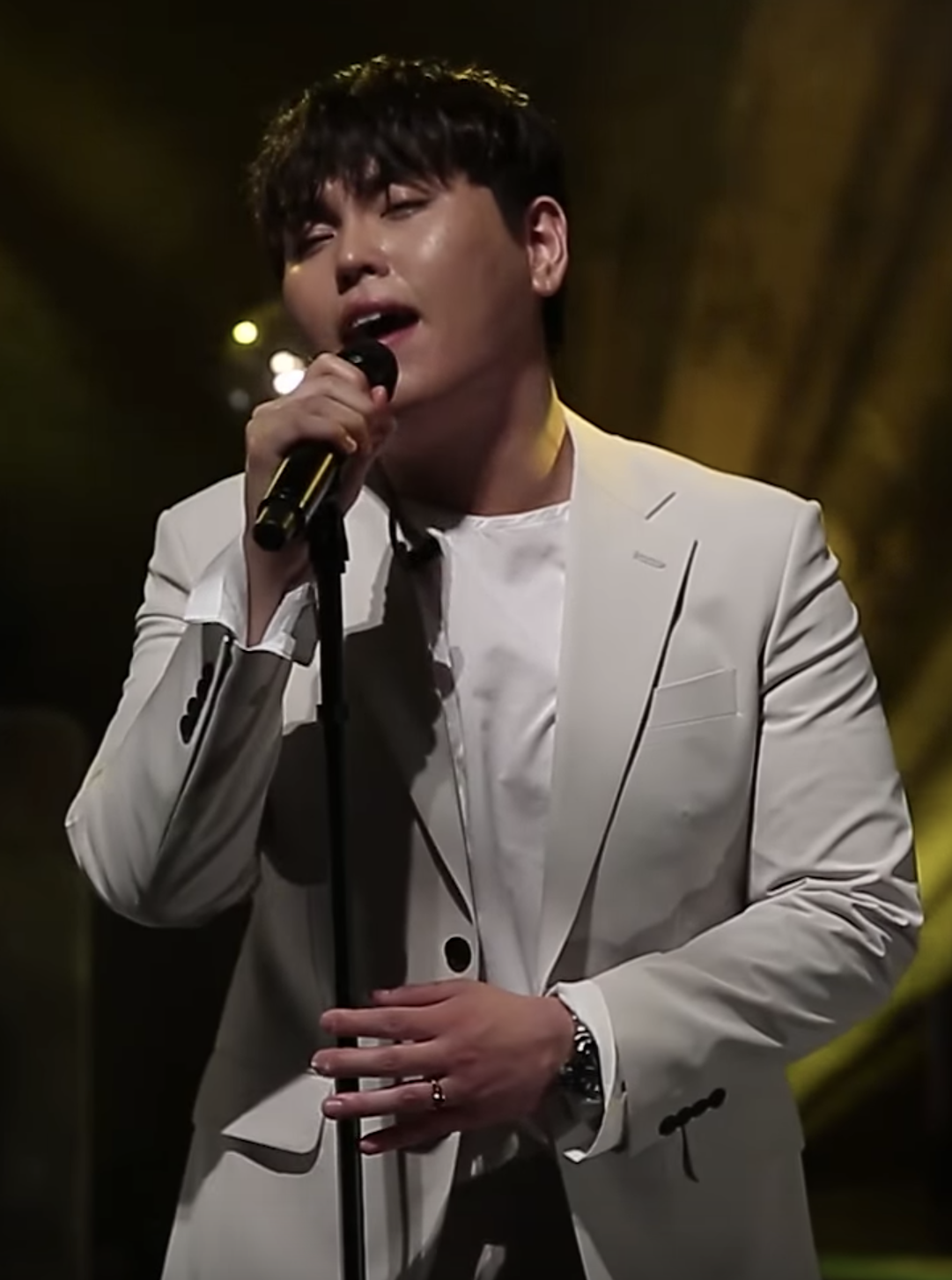
- Han in 2017

Background information
- Born: May 9, 1993 (age 33); Gumi, Gyeongsangbuk-do, South Korea
- Genre: Pop ballad
- Occupation: Singer
- Years active: 2014–present
- Labels: Pledis; Brand New Music
- Website: Official website

Korean name
- Hangul: 한동근
- RR: Han Donggeun
- MR: Han Tonggŭn

Han Dong-geun (born May 9, 1993) is a South Korean singer. He is the winner of MBC's Star Audition Season 3.

== Career ==
On September 30, 2014, Han officially debuted with the digital single "Making a new ending for this story". He released the music video to his second single "Unread" on December 9, 2014. On April 15, 2015 After School’s Jung Ah and Han Dong Geun released their duet for Pledis Project "Parting", titled "Between Us". In early April 2016, he appeared on music show King of Mask Singer with the nickname "Vote on April 13th". On August 23, 2016, he released music video for "Amazing You". In 2016 he achieved resurgence in popularity through his participation on Duet Song Festival.

On December 20, 2019, he decided to not renew his contract and parted ways with Pledis Entertainment. A few days later, on December 26, 2019, he signed an exclusive contract with Brand New Music.

== Personal life ==
In September 2018, Han was charged with driving under the influence (DUI) after driving in the neighborhood of Bangbae. His blood alcohol content was 0.103%, which exceeds the license revocation limit thus his driver’s license was revoked.

On January 18, 2022, it was confirmed that Han will marry a non-celebrity girlfriend. The wedding will be held on May 21, 2022. Later the same day, Han's agency confirmed true that Han was dating a non-celebrity and preparing for marriage.

== Discography ==
=== Studio albums ===
Title	Album details	Peak chart positions	Sales
Title	Album details	KOR	Sales
Your Diary	Released: May 5, 2017; Label: Pledis Entertainment; Formats: CD, digital download	33	KOR: 1,077

=== Extended plays ===
Title	Album details	Peak chart positions
Title	Album details	KOR
Broken People (이별할 사람들)	Released: December 4, 2017; Label: Pledis Entertainment; Formats: CD, digital download	40
Obscured Star (재회: 구름에 가려진 별)	Released: January 22, 2020; Label: Brand New Music; Formats: CD, digital download	64

=== Singles ===
Title	Year	Peak chart positions	Sales	Album
Title	Year	KOR	Sales	Album
"Making a New Ending for This Story" (이 소설의 끝을 다시 써보려 해)	2014	1	KOR: 2,500,000	Non-album singles
"Unread" (읽지 않음)	2014	—		Non-album singles
"Between the Two of Us" (우리사이...) (with Kim Jung-ah)	2015	—		Non-album singles
"Amazing You" (그대라는 사치)	2016	7	KOR: 2,500,000	Non-album singles
"Crazy" (미치고 싶다)	2017	8	KOR: 947,943	Your Diary
"Forever Young" (with Bumzu)	2017	—		Non-album single
"Undoable" (안 될 사랑)	2017	25	KOR: 50,478	Broken People
"I've Been Waiting for You" (나를 기다렸나요)	2019	99	—N/a	Obscured Star
"Farewell" (잘 헤어진 거야)	2020	—	—N/a	Obscured Star
"Candle" (초)	2020	195	—N/a	Non-album singles
"Usual" (보통 같으면)	2020	88	—N/a	Non-album singles
"West Sea" (서쪽 바다) (with Jang Hye-jin)	2020	—	—N/a	Non-album singles
"The Road" (길)	2020	—	—N/a	Non-album singles
"Letter to Myself 10 Years Ago" (10년 전의 나에게)	2020	—	—N/a	Non-album singles
"It's Love" (사랑인걸)	2022	33	—N/a	Non-album singles
"Dawn Call from You" (새벽에 걸려온 너의 전화는)	2022	40	—N/a	Non-album singles
"Long Time No See" (오랜만이야)	2023	145	—N/a	Non-album singles
"If I Love Again" (다시 사랑한다면)	2023	77	—N/a	Non-album singles

=== Soundtrack appearances ===
Title	Year	Peak chart positions	Album
Title	Year	KOR	Album
"Wherever You Are" (그 곳이 어디든)	2016	—	Hwarang: The Poet Warrior Youth OST Part 1
"At the End of the Day There's You" (하루끝엔 그대가 있어요)	2018	89	Live OST Part 2
"If You Just Love" (그저 사랑한다면)	2020	—	When My Love Blooms OST Part 5
"A Wishless Mind" (바랄 수 없는 마음)	2020	—	When I Was Most Beautiful OST Part 8
"That Kind of Person" (그런 사람)	2021	—	Undercover OST Part 1
"Remember Your Day"	2021	—	Oh My Ladylord OST Part 2
"Bitter" (쓰다)	2022	—	Bad Prosecutor OST Part 6

=== Other charted songs ===
Title	Year	Peak chart positions	Album
Title	Year	KOR	Album
"Open Arms" (with Soul Supreme)	2013	68	Star Audition 3 Mentor Survival Part 1
"My Love by My Side" (내사랑 내곁에)	2013	62	Star Audition 3 Top 16

== Awards and nominations ==
Year	Award	Category	Nominated work	Result	Ref.
2016	Asia Artist Awards	Rising Star Award		Won	
2016	MBC Entertainment Awards	Best Newcomer Award (Music / Talk Show)		Won	
2017	Seoul Music Awards	Discovery of the Year		Won	
2017	Gaon Chart Music Awards	Discovery of the Year		Won	
2017	Mnet Asian Music Awards	Best Vocal Performance Male Solo	"Crazy" (미치고 싶다)	Nominated	
2017	Mnet Asian Music Awards	Song of the Year	"Crazy" (미치고 싶다)	Nominated	
2018	Gaon Chart Music Awards	Song of the Year – May	"Crazy" (미치고 싶다)	Nominated	

== Filmography ==
=== Variety show ===
Year	Title	TV Network	Notes
2018	Battle Trip	KBS2	Special MC (Episode 79–80)
