= Vibe (South Korean band) =

South Korean R&B group

Vibe 바이브
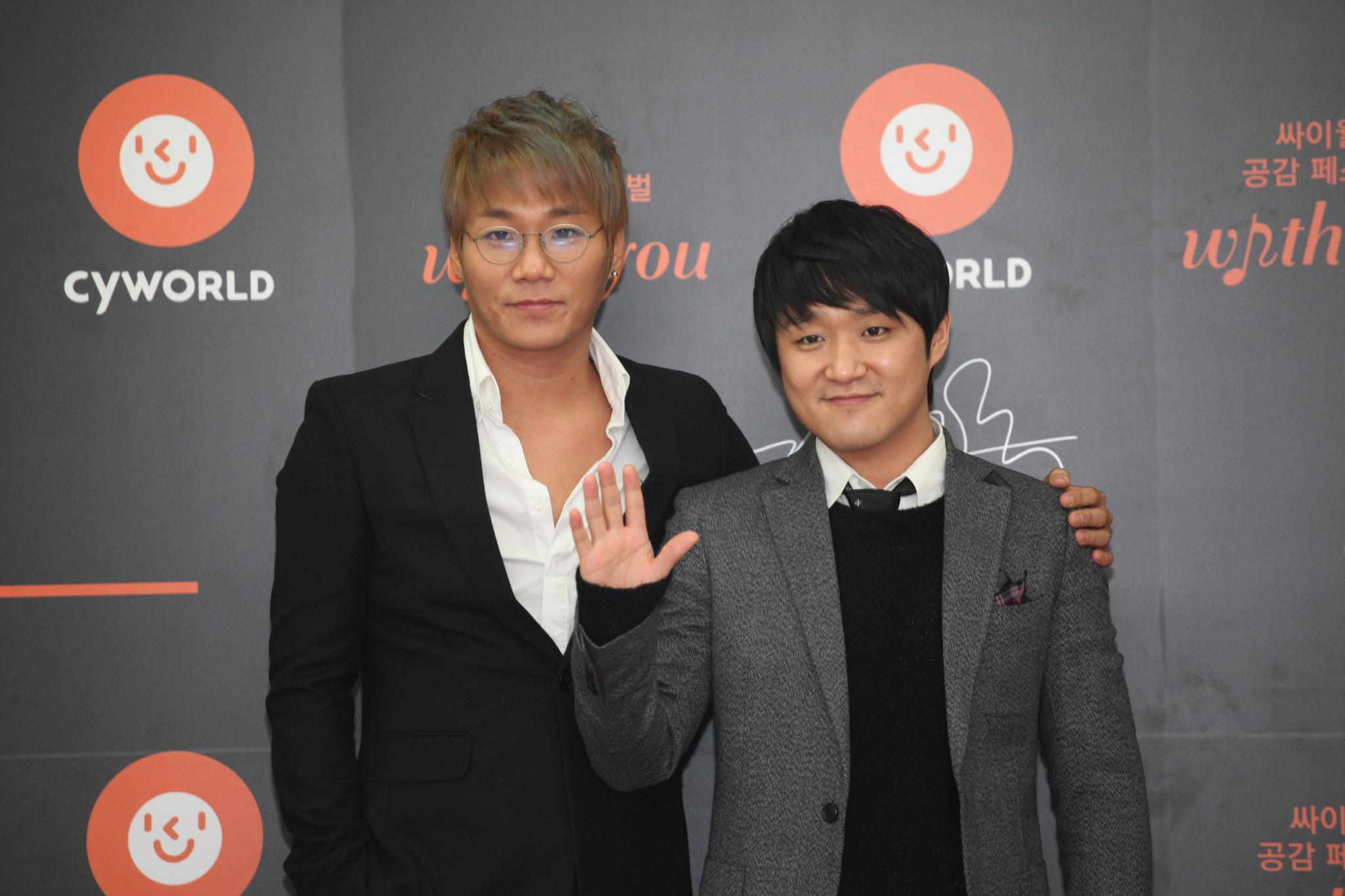
- Vibe in 2011; Left to right: Yoon Min-soo and Ryu Jae-hyun

Background information
- Origin: South Korea
- Genres: K-pop; R&B
- Years active: 2002–present
- Label: Major9
- Members: Yoon Min-soo; Ryu Jae-hyun
- Past members: Yoo Sung-gyu
- Website: major9.net/home/info/146

Vibe (Korean: 바이브) is a South Korean R&B group consisting of singers Yoon Min-soo and Ryu Jae-hyun. They debuted in 2002 as a trio with rapper Yoo Sung-gyu, who left the group after the release of their second album. Vibe has released eight studio albums, and numerous hit songs including "Love Me Once Again", "Long Long Time", "While Looking at the Picture", "That Man, That Woman", "Drinking", and "Come Back to Me".

== Career ==
Vibe was formed in 2002 by Yoon Min-soo, former member of vocal group 4Men, and were initially a trio consisting of Yoon, singer-songwriter Ryu Jae-hyun and rapper Yoo Sung-gyu. Their first single "미워도 다시 한번 (Although It Is Hateful, Again)" was a success and a huge hit for the group making them very popular. Their second single "Promise U" was also very successful. Their second album was released in November 2003 and their first single "오래 오래 (Long Long Time)" was a huge hit as was their second single "사진을 보다가 (While Looking at the Picture)". This cemented their status as a popular group and consistent hit makers. During the hiatus between their 2nd and 3rd albums, Yoo left the group as he wished to pursue his own style of music, taking on the stage name Noblesse. Vibe went on to release their 3rd album in 2006 which became a success with their two hits "그 남자, 그 여자 (That Man, That Woman)" and "술이야 (Drinking)". They were on hiatus from 2006 to 2009 as both members enlisted for their mandatory military service. Vibe released their 4th album and their title song was "다시 와주라" (Comeback Again).

While Vibe has not been promoting together on a regular basis, Ryu and Yoon have been individually pursuing their solo careers. In 2011, Yoon joined the cast of MBC's I Am a Singer, and debuted singing "그 남자, 그 여자 (That Man, That Woman)" and "술이야 (Drinking)", obtaining second place behind Insooni (인순이). Ryu gained fame as a composer and producer, composing for the likes of SG Wannabe, SeeYa and F.T. Island. Vibe was the featured legend on Immortal Songs: Singing the Legend episode 531, which aired on November 6, 2021.

== Discography ==
=== Studio albums ===
Title	Album details	Peak chart positions		Sales
Title	Album details	KOR RIAK	KOR Gaon	Sales
Afterglow	Released: February 26, 2002; Label: Warner Music; Formats: CD, cassette	24	—N/a	KOR: 62,007
Do U Remember?	Released: November 28, 2003; Label: Star Factory; Formats: CD, cassette	4	—N/a	KOR: 120,804
Re-Feel	Released: March 1, 2006; Label: Wave Point; Formats: CD, cassette	3	—N/a	KOR: 92,926
Vibe in Praha	Released: May 12, 2010; Label: Music&New; Formats: CD, digital download	—N/a	3	KOR: 23,995
Organic Sound	Released: May 15, 2013; Label: Music&New; Formats: CD, digital download	—N/a	5	KOR: 6,914
Ritardando	Released: February 20, 2014; Label: Music&New; Formats: CD, digital download	—N/a	7	KOR: 4,776
7 Part 1: Repeat	Released: April 21, 2016; Label: The Vibe Entertainment; Formats: CD, digital download	—N/a	15	KOR: 1,993
7 Part 2: Repeat & Slur	Released: November 15, 2016; Label: The Vibe Entertainment; Formats: CD, digital download	—N/a	27	KOR: 1,130
About Me	Released: October 10, 2018; Label: Major9; Formats: CD, digital download	—N/a	27	KOR: 1,312

=== Singles ===
Title	Year	Peak chart positions	Sales	Certifications	Album
Title	Year	KOR	Sales	Certifications	Album
"Love Me Once Again" (미워도 다시 한번)	2002	—N/a			Afterglow
"Promise U"	2002	—N/a			Afterglow
"Long Long Time" (오래 오래)	2003	—N/a			Do U Remember?
"While Looking at the Picture" (사진을 보다가)	2003	—N/a			Do U Remember?
"That Man, That Woman" (그 남자 그 여자) feat. Jang Hye-jin	2006	81	KOR: 237,454		Re-Feel
"Drink Again" (술이야)	2006	65	KOR: 270,111		Re-Feel
"Come Back to Me" (다시 와주라)	2010	2	KOR: 2,308,026		Vibe in Praha
"Crazy" (미친거니)	2010	40	KOR: 1,252,244		Vibe in Praha
"For the Last Time" (꼭 한번 만나고 싶다)	2013	4	KOR: 1,024,095		Organic Sound
"As I'm Getting Older" (이 나이 먹도록)	2013	5	KOR: 728,129		Organic Sound
"Heaven" (천국) feat. Lee Yeong-hyeon, Shin Yong-jae of 4Men, Im Se-jun, Wonji of Bella4	2013	5	KOR: 296,576		Ritardando
"Haeundae" (해운대) feat. Kang Min-kyung	2014	7	KOR: 345,077		Ritardando
"Lonely Christmas" (나홀로 크리스마스) with 4Men, Ben, Im Se-jun, MIIII, Min Yeon-jae	2014	47	KOR: 32,590		Non-album singles
"Celebrate Love" (축가) with 4Men, Ben, Im Se-jun, MIIII	2015	27	KOR: 95,296		Non-album singles
"You're My Christmas" (넌 나의 크리스마스) with Shin Yong-jae, Ben, Im Se-jun, MIIII	2015	22	KOR: 98,841		Non-album singles
"Lil' Something" (썸타) with Chen, Heize	2016	12	KOR: 327,443		SM Station Season 1
"1 Year, 365 Days" (1년 365일) feat. Gummy	2016	12	KOR: 292,044		Repeat
"Bottoms Up" (원샷) feat. Kim Heung-gook	2016	—			Non-album single
"A Lonely Guy" (외로운 놈)	2016	26	KOR: 73,107		Repeat & Slur
"Goodbye Santa Claus" with 4Men, Ben, Kim Dong-jun, Francis, Yo$ap	2017	—			Major9 Winter Album
"Fall in Fall" (가을 타나 봐)	2018	3	KOR: 2,500,000	KMCA: Platinum (Downloads); KMCA: Platinum (Streaming)	About Me
"Not a Love"	2018	68			About Me
"Call Me Back" (이 번호로 전화해줘)	2019	5			Non-album single
"Lying" (사랑하는 척) (with Sohyang)	2022	130			Revibe Vol. 7
"—" denotes release did not chart.

== Awards and nominations ==
Year	Award	Category	Nominee	Result	Ref.
2006	Golden Disc Awards	Main Prize (Bonsang)	"That Man, That Woman"	Won	
2006	Golden Disc Awards	Music Video Award	"That Man, That Woman"	Won	
2006	SBS Gayo Daejeon	Main Prize (Bonsang)	Vibe	Won	
2006	Seoul Music Awards	Main Prize (Bonsang)	Vibe	Won	
2021	Golden Disc Awards	Digital Bonsang	Call Me Back	Nominated	
