= 4Men =

South Korean R&B group

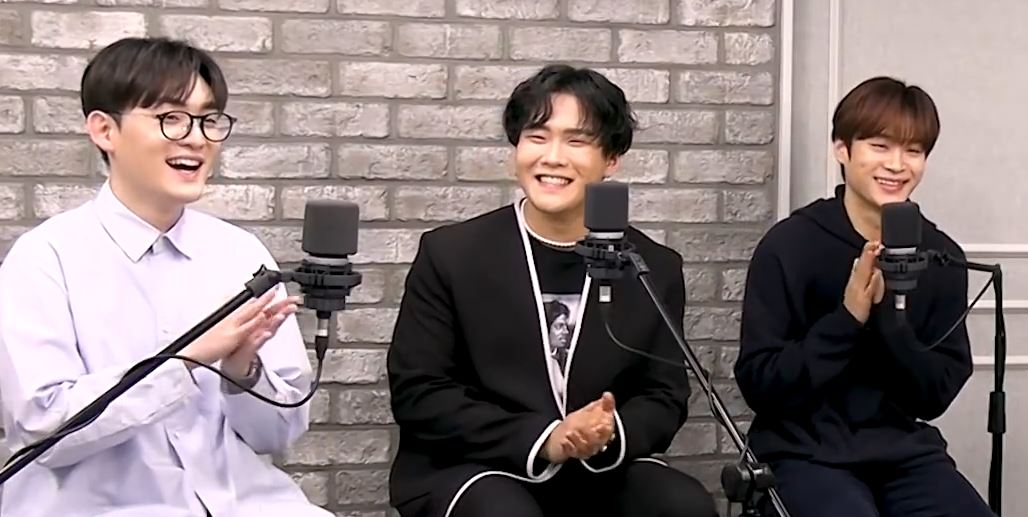
- 4Men in December 2021; Left to right: Hanbin, Joseph, and Haeun

Background information
- Origin: South Korea
- Genres: K-pop; R&B; soul
- Years active: 1998–2019, 2021–present
- Label: Major9
- Members: Haeun; Joseph; Hanbin
- Past members: Yoon Min-soo; Jeong Se-young; Han Hyeon-hee; Lee Jeong-ho; J1; Kim Young-jae; Shin Yong-jae; Kim Won-joo

4Men (Korean: 포맨) is a South Korean rhythm and blues group formed in 1998. The group consists of three members: Haeun, Joseph, Hanbin.

Originally a four-member group composed of Yoon Min-soo, Jeong Se-young, Han Hyeon-hee and Lee Jeong-ho, 4Men released their debut album, Four Men First Album, on February 1, 1998. Two years later, they released their second album Ireoke Cheonildongan Moeumyeon Ibyeori Sarajindago Haetda on December 29, 2000. In 2001, Yoon Min-soo withdrew from the group, forming R&B group Vibe in 2002 with Ryu Jae-Hyun and Yoo Sung-Gyu, meanwhile 4Men continued as a three-member group until J1 joined the group in 2006. In 2008, all members withdrew from the group, Jeong Se-young and Han Hyeon-hee join and form R&B group Someday in 2009, however, although, it later disbanded in 2011, later Jeong Se Young and Yoo Sung-gyu, better known as Noblesse, join and form the r&b duo, Takeout. However, following later that year, the group was revamped with three new members: Shin Yong-jae, Kim Young-jae and Kim Won-joo. 4Men promoted as a duo after Kim Young-jae's withdrawal from the group in 2014.

On August 31, 2019, it was announced that Shin Yong Jae and Kim Won Joo had departed from Major9 after their exclusive contracts expired and formed vocal duo, 2F. On April 5, 2021, a teaser video was released and announced that 4Men would be making a comeback on April 14 with the single "Still". The following day, Major9 confirmed that the group would have a new, 4th generation lineup for the comeback, consist of Haeun, Joseph, and Hanbin.

== Members ==
Current

- Haeun (하은) 2021–present / 4th Generation
- Joseph (요셉) 2021–present / 4th Generation
- Hanbin (한빈) 2021–present / 4th Generation

Former

- Yun Min-soo (윤민수) 1998–2001 / 1st Generation
- Jeong Se-young (정세영) 1998–2008 / 1st Generation, 2nd Generation
- Han Hyeon-hee (한현희) 1998–2008 / 1st Generation, 2nd Generation
- Lee Jeong-ho (이정호) 1998–2008 / 1st Generation, 2nd Generation
- J1 (재원) 2006–2008 / 2nd Generation
- Kim Young-jae (김영재) 2008–2014 / 3rd Generation
- Shin Yong-jae (신용재) 2008–2019 / 3rd Generation
- Kim Won-joo (김원주) 2008–2019 / 3rd Generation

== Discography ==
=== Studio albums ===
Title	Album details	Peak chart positions	Sales
Title	Album details	KOR	Sales
Four Men First Album	Released: February 1, 1998; Label: Kingpin Entertainment, Pison Contents; Formats: CD, cassette	—N/a	—N/a
If I Gather For a Thousand Days Like This, the Breakup Will Disappear (이렇게 천일동안 모으면 이별이 사라진다고 했다)	Released: December 29, 2000; Label: Kingpin Entertainment, Pison Contents; Formats: CD, cassette	—N/a	—N/a
Andante	Released: March 10, 2006; Label: Avoid Note; Formats: CD, cassette	—N/a	KOR: 1,704
The 3rd Generation (Special Album)	Released: January 18, 2010; Label: YWHO; Formats: CD, digital download	5	KOR: 16,976
The Artist	Released: June 7, 2011; Label: YWHO, Happy Face Entertainment; Formats: CD, digital download	3	KOR: 11,763
1998	Released: May 13, 2014; Label: YWHO, Happy Face Entertainment; Formats: CD, digital download	15	KOR: 3,309
Remember Me	Released: October 24, 2017; Label: Major9; Formats: CD, digital download	28	KOR: 970
"—" denotes release did not chart.

=== EP/Mini-albums ===
Title	Album details	Peak chart positions	Sales
Title	Album details	KOR	Sales
First Kiss	Released: October 7, 2008; Label: The Vibe Entertainment; Formats: CD	—N/a	—N/a
Sorry	Released: October 28, 2010; Label: YWHO, Taillruns Media; Formats: CD, digital download	9	—N/a
That Man, That Woman (그 남자 그 여자) (Collaboration with MIIII)	Released: November 1, 2011; Label: Happy Face Entertainment; Formats: CD, digital download	13	KOR: 1,348
The True Story (실화)	Released: January 28, 2013; Label: YWHO, Happy Face Entertainment; Formats: CD, digital download	10	KOR: 1,475
Thank You	Released: May 8, 2013; Label: YWHO, Happy Face Entertainment; Formats: CD, digital download	19	KOR: 1,266
Studying Abroad (유학)	Released: June 24, 2015; Label: YWHO, Happy Face Entertainment; Formats: CD, digital download	20	KOR: 565
The Eternal	Released: June 4, 2021; Label: YWHO, Happy Face Entertainment; Formats: CD, digital download	—N/a	—N/a

=== Compilation album ===
- Baby+4Men (2015)

=== Live album ===
- 4Men 1st Live Album (2015)

=== Singles ===
Title	Year	Peak chart positions	Sales	Album
Title	Year	KOR	Sales	Album
"More Than I Love Myself" (나보다 더 나를 사랑한)	1998	—N/a		Four Men First Album
"Flower Petals" (꽃잎)	2000	—N/a		If I Gather For a Thousand Days Like This, the Breakup Will Disappear
"Confession" (고백)	2006	—N/a		Andante
"Can I Love Again?" (다시 사랑할 수 있을까) (with Park Jung-eun)	2006	—N/a		Andante
"Gift" (선물)	2007	—N/a		Non-album singles
"Melody" (멜로디) (with Park Jung-eun)	2008	—N/a		Non-album singles
"First Kiss"	2008	—N/a		First Kiss
"Knock Knock Knock" (똑똑똑)	2009	52		Voice of Autumn
"I Can't" (못해) (featuring MIII)	2010	3	KOR: 3,232,590	The 3rd Generation
"U"	2010	2	KOR: 1,411,292	Non-album singles
"Crying, Calling..." (울고, 불고...) (with Zia)	2010	4	KOR: 1,175,895	Non-album singles
"Sorry" (미안해) (featuring MIII)	2010	13		Sorry
Hello!	2010	33	KOR: 526,268	Sorry
"Once While Living" (살다가 한번쯤)	2011	2	KOR: 2,519,609	The Artist
"Vision of Love" (너의 웃음 고마워)	2011	10	KOR: 736,193	Non-album single
"That Man, That Woman" (그 남자 그 여자) (with MIII)	2011	4	KOR: 2,358,283	That Man, That Woman
"Hello, It's Me" (안녕 나야)	2013	4	KOR: 1,141,246	The True Story
"Thank You"	2013	16	KOR: 252,489	Thank You
"Propose Song" (청혼하는 거예요)	2013	3	KOR: 1,119,539	Thank You
"Pray" (예쁘니까 잘 될 거야)	2014	13	KOR: 257,580	1998
"Erase" (지우고 싶다)	2014	7	KOR: 370,214	1998
"OK"	2014	36	KOR: 83,063	1998
"Lonely Christmas" (나홀로 크리스마스) (with The Vibe artists)	2014	47		Non-album singles
"Celebrate Love" (축가) (with The Vibe artists)	2015	27		Non-album singles
"You're My Home" (넌 나의 집)	2015	6		Non-album singles
"Blanket Kick" (이불킥)	2015	37		Studying Abroad
"Hug Me" (안아보자)	2015	1		4Men 1st Live Album
"Break Up in the Morning" (눈 떠보니 이별이더라)	2017	11		Remember Me
"Goodbye Santa Claus" (굿바이 산타클로스) (with Major9 artists)	2017	—		Non-album single
"Stil" (우린 아직 헤어지기 전)	2021	—		The Eternal
"Eternal" (영영)	2021	—		The Eternal
"Butterfly Grave" (나비무덤)	2023	15		Non-album singles
"Lost Mind" (미친거니)	2023	182		Non-album singles
"—" denotes release did not chart.

== Awards and nominations ==
Award	Year	Category	Nominated work/nominee	Result	Ref.
Korea Drama Awards	2013	Best Original Soundtrack	"Only You"	Won	
Melon Music Awards	2010	Top 10 Artist Award	4Men	Won	
Mnet Asian Music Awards	2010	Best Vocal Performance (Group)	"I Can't"	Nominated	
Mnet Asian Music Awards	2011	Best Vocal Performance (Group)	"Once While Living"	Nominated	
Mnet Asian Music Awards	2012	Best Vocal Performance (Group)	"That Man, That Woman"	Nominated	
Seoul Music Awards	2011	R&B Ballad Award	4Men	Won	
