= Yoon Min-soo =

South Korean singer

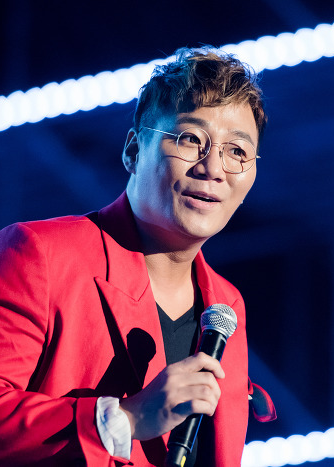
- Yoon in 2016.

Background information
- Also known as: Maurice
- Born: February 27, 1980 (age 46); Seoul, South Korea
- Genres: R&B
- Occupations: Singer
- Years active: 1998–present
- Member of: Vibe
- Formerly of: 4Men

Yoon Min-soo (Korean: 윤민수; born February 27, 1980) is a South Korean singer and television personality. He and Ryu Jae-hyun comprise the K-pop/contemporary R&B duo Vibe. He was a former cast member of the variety show Dad! Where Are We Going?.

== Discography ==
=== Singles ===
Title	Year	Peak chart positions	Sales	Album
Title	Year	KOR	Sales	Album
"Daylight" (애한)	2017	—	—N/a	Non-album singles
"Drunk on Love" (술이 문제야) with Jang Hye-jin	2019	1	—N/a	Non-album singles
"Please Find Her" (그녀를 찾아주세요)	2022	85	—N/a	Non-album singles

=== Other charted songs ===
Title	Year	Peak chart positions	Sales	Album
Title	Year	KOR	Sales	Album
"One Girl's Love Story" (어느 소녀의 사랑이야기)	2014	13	KOR: 113,662	Immortal Songs: Singing the Legend: Park Geon-ho
"Fate" (인연) with Shin Yong-jae of 4Men	2014	3	KOR: 1,113,581	Immortal Songs: Singing the Legend: Lee Sun-hee
"Please" (제발) with Shin Yong-jae of 4Men	2014	9	KOR: 178,152	Immortal Songs: Singing the Legend: Immortal Harmony
"Bygone Love" (옛사랑)	2015	33	KOR: 55,513	Immortal Songs: Singing the Legend: Lee Young-hoon

== Filmography ==
=== Television shows ===
Year	Title	Role	Notes	Ref.
2022	Now, Follow Me	Cast Member		
