= Cool (band) =

South Korean pop group

- Origin: South Korea
- Genres: K-pop; dance; ballad
- Years active: 1994–2005 (occasional collaborations/reunions up to present)
- Members: Kim Sung-soo; Lee Jae-hoon; Yuri
- Past members: Yoo Chae-yeong; Choi Joon-yeong

Cool (Korean: 쿨) was a South Korean co-ed group that debuted in 1994.

== History ==
They debuted in 1994 as "The Reason I Wanted You". In the 1st album, Kim Sung-soo, Lee Jae-hoon, Yoo Chae-young and Choi Jun-myung were four, but from the second album, Yoo Chae-young and Choi Jun-myeong withdrew and while female member Yuri joined them, Kim Sung-soo and Lee Jae-hoon together acted as a three-member group.

Vocal Lee Jae-hoon's steady singing skills, fun songs and images continued to be popular. Cool's songs were simple and easy to sing, so it was easy for the general public to love it. Their songs were often in the top sung songs in Korean karaoke. They mainly performed in dance and ballad music. In 2002, they received the Golden Disk Award, recording their seventh album as the year's best-selling album.

On August 2, 2005, they announced their disbandment, but on July 25, 2008, they started activities again after releasing the 10.5 "I Want to Love" album. In summer 2009, they released the 11th regular album. In 2014, they celebrated 20th anniversary with the release of "Goodbye" and began touring with broadcasting activities such as "Hidden Singer" and "Infinite Challenge."

== Discography ==
=== Studio albums ===
Title	Album details	Peak chart positions	Sales
Title	Album details	KOR	Sales
The Reason I Wanted You (너이길 원했던 이유)	Released: July 1, 1994; Label: Warner Music Korea; Format: CD, cassette	No data	No data
The [Ku:l] : Love Is..., Waiting	Released: October 1, 1995; Label: Warner Music Korea; Format: CD, cassette	No data	No data
Destined For The Best	Released: November 1, 1996; Label: Warner Music Korea; Format: CD, cassette	No data	No data
Summer Story	Released: July 1, 1997; Label: Samsung Music; Format: CD, cassette	No data	No data
Cool 4	Released: April 1, 1998; Label: Samsung Music, Orange Popular; Format: CD, cassette	No data	KOR: 789,016
Cool 4.5	Released: January 1, 1999; Label: Ono Entertainment, Synnara Music; Format: CD, cassette	1	KOR: 339,570
Cool 5	Released: April 1, 2000; Label: Ono Entertainment, Synnara Music; Format: CD, cassette	1	KOR: 680,294
6ix	Released: July 4, 2001; Label: Ono Entertainment, Fandango!, LKPOP, smtrax; Format: CD, cassette	6	KOR: 582,584
First Whisper	Released: December 6, 2001; Label: Ono Entertainment, Fandango!, LKPOP, smtrax; Format: CD, cassette	2	KOR: 368,164
7even	Released: July 4, 2002; Label: Ono Entertainment, Woongjin Music; Format: CD, cassette	1	KOR: 647,052
Second Whisper	Released: December 1, 2002; Label: Ono Entertainment, Woongjin Music; Format: CD, cassette	4	KOR: 317,815
8ight	Released: July 4, 2003; Label: Ono Entertainment, Woongjin Music; Format: CD, cassette	—	—N/a
Third Whisper	Released: December 18, 2003; Label: Ono Entertainment, Woongjin Music, Plyzen; Format: CD, cassette	—	—N/a
9th Performance: Let's See What's Happening Now	Released: July 4, 2004; Label: YBM Seoul Records, Sky Entertainment; Format: CD, cassette	2	KOR: 93,304
Forever	Released: July 15, 2005; Label: YBM Seoul Records, Sky Entertainment; Format: CD, cassette	1	KOR: 52,745
Cool Returns	Released: July 25, 2008; Label: Cool Music, Mnet Media; Format: CD	6	KOR: 20,193
Cool 11	Released: July 20, 2009; Label: Cool Music, Mnet Media; Format: CD	8	—N/a
"—" denotes release did not chart.

== Awards and nominations ==
List of awards and nominations received by Cool
Award-giving body	Year	Category	Nominee	Result	Ref.
Golden Disc Awards	1998	SKC Popularity Award	Sorrow	Won	
Golden Disc Awards	2001	Album Bonsang (Main Prize)	6ix	Won	
Golden Disc Awards	2001	Album Daesang (Grand Prize)	6ix	Nominated	
Golden Disc Awards	2002	Album Bonsang (Main Prize)	7even (Truth)	Won	
Golden Disc Awards	2002	Album Daesang (Grand Prize)	7even (Truth)	Won	
Golden Disc Awards	2003	Album Bonsang (Main Prize)	8ight	Won	
Golden Disc Awards	2003	Album Daesang (Grand Prize)	8ight	Nominated	
KBS Music Awards	1997	Singer of the Year (Bonsang)	Cool	Won	
KBS Music Awards	1998	Singer of the Year (Bonsang)	Cool	Won	
KBS Music Awards	2002	Singer of the Year (Bonsang)	Cool	Won	
Korea Entertainment Arts Awards	1999	Youth Mixed Singer Award	Cool	Won	
Mnet Asian Music Awards	2002	Best Mixed Group	"Truth"	Nominated	
Mnet Asian Music Awards	2009	Best Mixed Group	"Reporting Reporting"	Nominated	
SBS Gayo Daejeon	1997	Main Prize (Bonsang)	Cool	Won	
SBS Gayo Daejeon	1998	Main Prize (Bonsang)	Cool	Won	
SBS Gayo Daejeon	2001	Main Prize (Bonsang)	Cool	Won	
SBS Gayo Daejeon	2002	Main Prize (Bonsang)	Cool	Won	

== Notes ==
- Many of the albums are referred to by number and not by name on the Music Industry Association of Korea album chart.
