= Chae Ri-na =

South Korean singer (born 1978)

- Choi in 2024
- Born: February 3, 1978 (age 48); Yangju, South Korea
- Education: Seoul Girls' High School
- Occupation: Singer
- Years active: 1995–present
- Agent: Yechan Entertainment

Korean name
- Hangul: 박현주
- RR: Bak Hyeonju
- MR: Pak Hyŏnju

Stage name
- Hangul: 채리나
- RR: Chae Rina
- MR: Ch'ae Rina

Chae Ri-na (Korean: 채리나; born Bak Hyeon-ju (Park Hyun-Joo), Korean: 박현주; February 3, 1978) is a South Korean singer. She debuted in 1995 as a member of the best-selling co-ed vocal group Roo'ra. She was also a member of the girl group Diva, which debuted in 1997, and the duo Girl Friends, which debuted in 2006.

== Discography ==
- The First Step (2002)

== Personal life ==
Chae married professional baseball player Park Yong-geun in 2016.

== Awards and nominations ==
Name of the award ceremony, year presented, category, nominee of the award, and the result of the nomination
Award ceremony	Year	Category	Nominee / Work	Result	Ref.
SBS Entertainment Awards	2022	Excellence Award in Show and Sports Category	Kick a Goal	Won	
