= Roo'ra =

South Korean musical group

- Origin: South Korea
- Genres: Hip hop; dance-pop; reggae
- Years active: 1994–2001; 2009
- Past members: Kim Ji-hyun; Lee Sang-min; Shin Jung-hwan; Ko Young-wook; Chae Ri-na; Mikey Romeo

Roo'ra (Korean: 룰라) was a co-ed hip hop and dance-pop vocal group from South Korea who was one of the country's most popular musical acts of the 1990s. The group debuted in 1994 with the hit album Roots of Reggae. Their second album, The Angel Who Lost Wings (1995), sold 1 million copies in record time. Roo'ra disbanded in 2001, then reunited in 2009 to release their ninth and final album, A9ain.

== History ==
The group caused significant controversy in 1996 through the discovery of their unattributed sampling of a Japanese track called "Omatsuri Ninja" (Japanese: お祭り忍者) by boy group Ninja directly in their own song "Cheon sang yu ae" (Hanja: 天上有愛; Hangul: 천상유애).

This incident raised a heated debate "[...] about the nature of "Korean-ness in popular music" and pushed this pointy but long dormant issue to the forefront in the mid-1990s. The group nearly split in 1996 due to the controversy, but eventually only came to an end in 2001 after the release of a final album.

In 2008, the group was reunited with Lee Sang-min, Go Young-wook, Kim Ji-hyun, and Chae Ri-na to work on an upcoming album. In the middle of the project, Shin Jung-hwan and Go Young-wook formed a temporary duo group, "Roo'ra Man", and released a single, "The Reason Why I Hate Winter" in December 2008. The single was produced by Lee Sang-min. Roo'ra's last album, Again, was released in July 2009 with "Going Going" as the first single.

== Members ==
The original members of the group were Lee Sang-min, Go Young-wook, Kim Ji-hyun, and Shin Jung-hwan. In 1995, Shin Jung-hwan left the group to fulfill his military service requirement, and was replaced by Chae Ri-na. In 1997, Kim Ji-hyun left the group to pursue a solo career, and was replaced by temporary vocalist Mikey Romeo. Kim Ji-hyun returned for the release of the group's next album in 1999. After Roo'ra disbanded in 2001, members Lee Sang-min, Chae Ri-na, Go Young-wook, and Kim Ji-hyun reunited in 2009.

== Discography ==
=== Studio albums ===
Title	Album details	Peak chart positions	Sales
Title	Album details	KOR	Sales
Roots of Reggae	Released: July 1, 1994; Label: Daewoo Records; Format: CD, cassette	No data	No data
Roo'ra & TwoTwo's Christmas	Released: December 1, 1994; Label: World Music Co.; Format: CD, cassette	No data	No data
The Angel Who Lost Wings	Released: March 28, 1995; Label: World Music Co.; Format: CD, cassette	No data	KOR: 1,000,000+
Reincamation of the Legend	Released: December 16, 1995; Label: World Music Co.; Format: CD, cassette	No data	No data
All Systems Go	Released: June 15, 1996; Label: World Music Co.; Format: CD, cassette	No data	No data
The Final	Released: January 24, 1997; Label: World Music Co.; Format: CD, cassette	No data	No data
Six 'n Six	Released: February 26, 1999; Label: World Music Co.; Format: CD, cassette	3	KOR: 347,672+
A Song of the Wind	Released: June 12, 2000; Label: A&B Production; Format: CD, cassette	3	KOR: 176,618+
Best & Last	Released: July 27, 2001; Label: EMI Records; Format: CD, cassette	12	KOR: 46,728+
A9ain	Released: July 21, 2009; Label: Madang Dream, LOEN Entertainment; Format: CD	No data	No data
The Recording Industry of Korea album chart was established in 1999 and discontinued in 2008.

== Awards and nominations ==
Year	Award	Category	Work	Result	Ref.
1994	Seoul Music Awards	Main Prize (Bonsang)	N/A	Won	
1995	Seoul Music Awards	Grand Prize (Daesang)	N/A	Won	
1995	Golden Disc Awards	Main Prize (Bonsang)	The Angel Who Lost Wings	Won	
1999	Golden Disc Awards	Popularity Award	Six 'n Six	Won	
2000	Mnet Asian Music Awards	Best Mixed Group	"A Song of the Wind"	Nominated	
2001	Mnet Asian Music Awards	Best Mixed Group	"Clear Away" (정리)	Nominated	
2009	Mnet Asian Music Awards	Best Mixed Group	"Going Going"	Nominated	
