= MBC Gayo Daejejeon =

South Korean annual music awards

- 2023 Gayo Daejejeon Title Card
- Hangul: MBC 가요대제전
- Hanja: MBC 歌謠大祭典
- RR: MBC gayodaejejeon
- MR: MBC kayodaejejŏn
- Genre: Music
- Country of origin: South Korea
- Original language: Korean
- No. of episodes: 51

Production
- Production locations: MBC Dream Center, Ilsan

Original release
- Network: Munhwa Broadcasting Corporation (MBC)
- Release: 1966

The MBC Gayo Daejejeon (Korean: MBC 가요대제전) is an annual, end-of-the-year South Korean music show broadcast by the Munhwa Broadcasting Corporation (MBC). The event was first held in 1966 as a singing competition, but MBC stopped giving out awards in 2005.

== History ==
The event was first held in 1966 as the MBC Ten Singers Match (Hangul: MBC 10대 가수 청백전). It was a competition among ten singers, with the winner being awarded the "King of Ten Singers." It was broadcast live on MBC radio from the Seoul Citizens Hall. The event was broadcast on television starting in 1970.

In 1972, the Seoul Citizens Hall caught on fire at the end of that year's MBC Ten Singers Match. About 1,500 people were still inside the venue as the fire spread. Ultimately, 53 people were killed by the fire, and several of the singers in attendance that night were injured.

In 2005, MBC stopped giving out awards at the event after it was boycotted by numerous artists in 2004. The event was renamed the MBC Gayo Daejejeon in 2005.

Girls' Generation member Yoona has been the host since 2015. In 2024, Yoona announced her graduation from the MBC Gayo Daejejeon MC position after this year's event.

Year	Name	Hangul
1966–1973	MBC Top 10 Singer Match	MBC 10대 가수 청백전
1974–1986	MBC Top 10 Singer's Song Festival	MBC 10대 가수 가요제
1987	87 MBC Korean Music Festival	87 MBC 한국가요대제전
1988	88 MBC Gayo Daejejeon	88 MBC 가요대제전
1989–1992	MBC Top 10 Singer's Song Festival	MBC 10대 가수 가요제
1993–1995	MBC Korean Music Festival Exhibition	MBC 한국가요제전
1996–1997	MBC Korean Music Grand Prix	MBC 한국가요대제전
1998	MBC Music Festival	MBC 가요제전
1999–2004	MBC Top 10 Singer's Song Festival	MBC 10대 가수 가요제
2005 – present	MBC Gayo Daejejeon	MBC 가요대제전

== Hosts ==
Year	Hosts	Ref
2015	Yoona (Girls' Generation), Kim Sung-joo	
2016	Yoona (Girls' Generation), Kim Sung-joo	
2017	Yoona (Girls' Generation), Cha Eun-woo (Astro), Suho (Exo)	
2018	Yoona (Girls' Generation), Cha Eun-woo (Astro), Choi Min-ho (Shinee), Noh Hong Chul	
2019	Yoona (Girls' Generation), Cha Eun-woo (Astro), Jang Sung-kyu	
2020	Yoona (Girls' Generation), Jang Sung-kyu, Kim Seon-ho	
2021	Yoona (Girls' Generation), Jang Sung-kyu, Lee Jun-ho (2PM)	
2022	Yoona (Girls' Generation), Jang Sung-kyu, Lee Jun-ho (2PM)	
2023	Yoona (Girls' Generation), Choi Min-ho (Shinee), Hwang Min-hyun	
2024	Yoona (Girls' Generation), Choi Min-ho (Shinee), Dohoon (TWS)	
2025	Choi Min-ho (Shinee), Hwang Min-hyun, Annie (AllDay Project)	

== Award winners (1966–2005) ==
=== Best Popular Singer ===
Year	Artist	Song	Ref.
1966	Choe Hui-jun	"Student Boarder" (하숙생)	
1967	Lee Mi-ja	"Queen of Elegy" (엘레지의 여왕)	
1968	Lee Mi-ja	"Woman's Life" (여자의 일생)	
1969	Pearl Sisters	"My Dear" (님아)	
1970	Lee Mi-ja	"Yearning In My Mind" (그리움은 가슴마다)	
1971	Nam Jin	"Should Have A Beautiful Heart" (마음이 고와야지)	
1972	Nam Jin	"With You" (님과 함께)	
1973	Nam Jin	"Please Don't Change" (그대여 변치마오)	
1974	Ha Chun-hwa	"First Time Ever" (난생 처음)	
1975	Song Chang-sik	"Why Call" (왜 불러)	
1976	Song Dae-kwan	"Sunny Day" (해뜰날)	
1977	Hye Eun-yi	"I Love Only You" (당신만을 사랑해)	
1978	Choi Heon	"Cherry" (앵두)	
1979	Hye Eun-yi	"The Third Bridge" (제3한강교)	
1980	Cho Yong-pil	"Woman Outside The Window" (창밖의 여자)	
1981	Cho Yong-pil	"A Red Dragonfly" (고추잠자리)	
1982	Lee Yong	"Forgotten Season" (잊혀진 계절)	
1983	Cho Yong-pil	"I Like You" (나는 너 좋아)	
1984	Cho Yong-pil	"My Friend" (친구여)	
1985	Cho Yong-pil	"Yesterday, Today, And" (어제 오늘 그리고)	
1986	Cho Yong-pil	"In The Air" (허공)	
1987	Not awarded		
1988	Joo Hyun-mi	"The Man In Shinsa-dong" (신사동 그사람)	
1989	Joo Hyun-mi	"One-Sided Love" (짝사랑)	
1990	Byun Jin-sub	"Wish List" (희망사항)	
1991	Noh Sa-yeon	"Meeting" (만남)	
Best Popular Singer was not awarded from 1992-2001.
2002	Jang Na-ra	"Sweet Dream"	
2003	Lee Soo-young	"A Teardrop By Itself" (덩그러니)	
2004	Lee Soo-young	"Whistle To Me" (휠릴리)	
2005	Kim Jong-kook	"Loveable" (사랑스러워)	

=== Best Popular Song ===
Year	Artist	Song	Criteria	Ref.
1974	Lee Su-mi	"Stand By Me" (내 곁에 있어주)	N/A	
1975	Song Chang-sik	"Why Call" (왜 불러)	N/A	
1976	Song Dae-kwan	"Sunny Day" (해뜰날)	N/A	
1977	Hye Eun-yi	"I Love Only You" (당신만을 사랑해)	N/A	
1978	Yoon Soo-il	"Anything But You" (사랑만은 않겠어요)	N/A	
1979	Not awarded		N/A	
1980	Cho Yong-pil	"Woman Outside The Window" (창밖의 여자)	N/A	
1981	Cho Yong-pil	"A Red Dragonfly" (고추잠자리)	N/A	
1982	Lee Yong	"Forgotten Season" (잊혀진 계절)	N/A	
1983	Cho Yong-pil	"I Like You" (나는 너 좋아)	N/A	
1984	Lee Sun-hee	"To J" (J에게)	N/A	
1985	Kim Beom-ryong	"Wind Wind Wind" (바람 바람 바람)	N/A	
1986	Cho Yong-pil	"In The Air" (허공)	N/A	
1987	Not awarded		N/A	
1988	Joo Hyun-mi	"The Man In Shinsa-dong" (신사동 그사람)	N/A	
1989	Joo Hyun-mi	"One-Sided Love" (짝사랑)	N/A	
1990	Joo Hyun-mi	"Wait" (잠깐만)	N/A	
1991	Joo Hyun-mi	"Meeting" (만남)	N/A	
1992	Seo Taiji and Boys	"I Know" (난 알아요)	N/A	
1993	Kim Soo-hee	"Sad Love" (애모)	N/A	
1994	Kim Gun-mo	"Excuse" (핑계)	N/A	
1995	Seo Taiji and Boys	"Come Back Home"	N/A	
1996	Kim Gun-mo	"Speed"	N/A	
1997	H.O.T.	"Happiness" (행복)	N/A	
1998	H.O.T.	"Hope" (빛)	Chosen by people under 30	
1998	Kim Jong-hwan	"For Love" (사랑을 위하여)	Chosen by people over 30	
1999	Jo Sung-mo	"For Your Soul"	Chosen by people under 30	
1999	Song Dae-kwan	"Four Beats" (네박자)	Chosen by people over 30	
2000	Jo Sung-mo	"Do You Know" (아시나요)	Chosen by people under 30	
2000	Tae Jin-ah	"Does Anyone Love" (사랑은 아무나 하나)	Chosen by people over 30	
2001	G.o.d.	"Road" (길)	Chosen by people under 30	
2001	Tae Jin-ah	"Good For You" (잘났어 정말)	Chosen by people over 30	

=== Popular Singer Award / Top 10 Singer Award ===
This award was called the Popular Singer Award from 1998 to 2001, and the Top 10 Singer Award from 2002 to 2004.

Year	Artists																
1998	Cho Yong-pil	Fin.K.L	H.O.T.	Hyun Cheol	Jo Sung-mo	Kim Gun-mo	Kim Hyun-jung	Kim Jong-hwan	Na Hoon-a	S.E.S.	Sechs Kies	Seol Undo	Shin Seung-hun	Song Dae-kwan	Tae Jin-ah	Turbo	Uhm Jung-hwa
1999	Baby Vox	Fin.K.L	H.O.T.	Hyun Cheol	Jo Sung-mo	Joo Hyun-mi	Lee Jung-hyun	Lee Mi-ja	Na Hoon-a	S.E.S.	Sechs Kies	Seol Undo	Shinhwa	Song Dae-kwan	Tae Jin-ah	Uhm Jung-hwa	Yoo Seung-jun
2000	Country Kko Kko	Fin.K.L	G.o.d.	Hyun Cheol	Jo Sung-mo	Kim Hyun-jung	Seol Undo	Shin Seung-hun	Song Dae-kwan	Yoo Seung-jun	Tae Jin-ah	—	—	—	—	—	—
2001	Fin.K.L	G.o.d.	Im Chang-jung	Jo Sung-mo	Kangta	Kim Gun-mo	Kim Hyun-jung	Lee Sun-hee	S.E.S.	Seol Undo	Shinhwa	Song Dae-kwan	Tae Jin-ah	Uhm Jung-hwa	Wax	Yoo Seung-jun	—
2002	BoA	G.o.d.	Jang Na-ra	Kangta	Lee Soo-young	Rain	Shinhwa	Sung Si-kyung	Tae Jin-ah	Yoon Do Hyun Band	—	—	—	—	—	—	—
2003	Big Mama	BoA	Jo Sung-mo	Koyote	Lee Hyori	Lee Soo-young	NRG	Rain	Sung Si-kyung	Wheesung	—	—	—	—	—	—	—
2004	BoA	Kim Jong-kook	Koyote	Lee Seung-chul	Lee Soo-young	Rain	Seven	Shinhwa	TVXQ	Wheesung	—	—	—	—	—	—	—

=== New Singer Award ===
Year	Artists	
2000	Chakra	—
2001	Sung Si-kyung	Jang Na-ra
2002	Wheesung	—
2003	Seven	Lexy
2004	Lee Seung-gi	Jang Yoon-jeong

== Music festival (2015–present) ==
=== 2015 ===
The 2015 MBC Gayo Daejejeon was held on 31 December, hosted by Girls' Generation's YoonA & Kim Sung-joo

Performers:

- 2PM
- 4Minute
- Ailee
- AOA
- Apink
- B1A4
- B.A.P
- Baek Ji-young
- BTOB
- BTS
- CNBLUE
- Dynamic Duo x Crush
- EXO
- GFriend
- Girls' Generation
- Got7
- Hong Jin-young
- Infinite
- Lovelyz
- Mamamoo
- Monsta X
- Oh My Girl
- Park Jin-young
- Red Velvet
- Seventeen
- Shin Seung-hoon
- SHINee
- Sonamoo
- Tae Jin-ah
- Teen Top
- UP10TION
- VIXX
- Wonder Girls
- Zion.T

=== 2016 ===
The 2016 MBC Gayo Daejejeon was held on 31 December, hosted by Girls' Generation's YoonA & Kim Sung-joo

Performers:

- AOA
- Apink
- B1A4
- B.A.P
- BTOB
- BTS
- CNBLUE
- EXID
- EXO
- GFriend
- Got7
- Infinite
- Mamamoo
- Monsta X
- Red Velvet
- Seventeen
- SHINee
- Taeyeon
- Turbo (터보)
- Twice
- UP10TION
- VIXX

=== 2017 ===
The 2017 MBC Gayo Daejejeon was held on 31 December, hosted by EXO's Suho, Girls' Generation's YoonA & Astro's Cha Eun-woo.

Performers:

- EXO
- BTS
- Red Velvet
- Twice
- Wanna One
- WINNER
- VIXX
- EXID
- BTOB
- B.A.P
- MAMAMOO
- SECHSKIES
- Lovelyz
- MONSTA X
- GFriend
- PRISTIN
- Cosmic Girls
- SEVENTEEN
- ASTRO
- NCT 127
- Teen Top
- GOT7
- Zion.T
- Sunmi
- HyunA
- Hwang Chi Yeul
- No Brain
- Bolbbalgan4
- Urban Zakapa
- Seenroot

=== 2018: The Live ===
The 2018 MBC Gayo Daejejeon was held on 31 December, and hosted by Noh Hong Chul, Girls' Generation's YoonA, Shinee's Minho & Astro's Cha Eun-woo.

Performers:

- Apink
- BTOB
- BTS
- EXO
- GOT7
- iKON
- MONSTA X
- NCT Dream
- Now United
- Stray Kids
- The Boyz
- Twice
- Wanna One
- WINNER
- Golden Child
- Gugudan
- Norazo
- TVXQ
- Lovelyz
- Red Velvet
- MAMAMOO
- Momoland
- Vibe
- Baek Ji-young
- Ben
- Bolbbalgan4
- Bizzy
- VIXX
- Sunmi
- Sunwoo Jung-a
- SEVENTEEN
- (G)I-dle
- GFriend
- Oh My Girl
- Cosmic Girls
- Yoon Mi-rae
- Tiger JK
- Hong Jin-young
- Hwanhee

=== 2019: The Chemistry ===
The 2019 MBC Gayo Daejejeon was held on 31 December, and was hosted by Jang Sung-kyu, Girls' Generation's YoonA and Astro's Cha Eun-woo. The theme is the chemistry between idols who collaborate.

Performers:

- AOA
- GOT7
- ITZY
- Monsta X
- NCT Dream
- NCT 127
- Stray Kids
- Twice
- Guckkasten
- Kyuhyun (Super Junior)
- Kim Jae-hwan
- Norazo
- NU'EST
- Lovelyz
- Red Velvet
- MAMAMOO
- Sung Si-kyung
- Seventeen
- Celeb Five
- Song Ga-in
- Astro
- (G)I-dle
- Oh My Girl
- Cosmic Girls
- Lee Seok-hoon (SG Wannabe)
- Jang Woo-hyuk (H.O.T.)
- Chungha
- Taemin (SHINee)
- Hyuna
- Dawn
- Hong Jin-young
List of musical performances

No	Artist	Song	Note
1	NCT Dream X Stray Kids	"We Are The Future" (H.O.T), "Com'Back" (Sechskies), "Mirotic" (TVXQ), "Fantastic Baby" (Big Bang), "Love Shot" (EXO) and "Boy With Luv" (BTS) with Jang Sung-kyu	History of K-pop
2	(G)I-DLE X ITZY	"ICY", "Uh Oh", "DIVA" (Beyonce) & Dance performance	
3	Oh My Girl X Astro	"The Red Shoes" (IU)	
4	Kei (Lovelyz), Yeonjung (WJSN) and Kim Jae-hwan	"How Can I Love the Heartbreak, You're the One I Love" (AKMU)	
5	Norazo X Hong Jin-young	"Shower", "Cider" & "Love Tonight"	
6	Lee Seok-hoon X Kyuhyun	"Breath" (Lee Hi)	King of Masked Singer Special, dedicated to Kim Jong-hyun, Sulli & Goo Hara
7	Jang Woo-hyuk X Chungha	"Gotta Go" & Dance performance	
8	HyunA X Dawn	Dance performance	
9	Celeb Five X AOA	Dance performance (sample From "I'm Jelly Baby" (AOA Cream), "Bad Guy" (Billie Eilish) & "Do You Wanna" (Celeb Five))	
10	NU'EST (Baekho & Minhyun) X GOT7 (JB & Youngjae) X MONSTA X (Shownu & Kihyun)	"Just A Feeling" (S.E.S)	
11	Sung Si-kyung X Red Velvet	"It's You"	Wendy Is Absent Due To Injury
12	Mamamoo X Seventeen	"Egoistic", "Very Nice" & "You Are The Best + CLAP"	
13	Taemin X Twice (Jihyo & Momo)	"Goodbye"	
14	Guckkasten X Song Ga-in	"The Sun"	

=== 2020: The Moment ===
The 2020 MBC Gayo Daejejeon was held on 31 December, hosted by Jang Sung-kyu, Girls' Generation's YoonA and Kim Seon-ho.

Performers:

- Park Jin-young
- Rain
- Uhm Jung-hwa
- Lim Young-woong
- Mamamoo
- NCT
- Song Ga-in
- Henry
- Got7
- Itzy
- Stray Kids
- Twice
- Kang Seung-yoon (Winner)
- Norazo
- The Boyz
- Kim Shin-young
- (G)I-dle
- Monsta X
- Iz*One
- aespa
- Oh My Girl
- Loona
- Top 4 singers from People of Trot (An Seong-jun, Kim So-yeon, Kim Jae-rong and Doubleless)
- Jessi
- Paul Kim
List of musical performances

Order	Artist	Song	Notes
1	1-The Boyz Juyeon, Itzy Lia, Stray Kids Han; 2-The Boyz Younghoon, (G)I-dle Yuqi, Stray Kids Felix; 3-Stray Kids Hyunjin, Iz*One Wonyoung, The Boyz Hyunjae	1-"Play The Summer"; 2-"In Summer"; 3-"Beach Again"	SSAK3 Special
2	SNSD Yoona; Kim Seon-ho	"Perhaps Love"	Princess Hours OST
3	Aespa	"Black Mamba"	
4	Stray Kids	"Back Door" "TA"	
5	Loona	"Why Not?"	
6	(G)I-dle (Soojin & Soyeon); Iz*One (Yuri & Minju); Itzy (Yeji & Ryujin)	"Reflection"	Song by Fifth Harmony
7	Iz*One	Intro + "Panorama"	
8	Itzy	"Not Shy" (Hip-Hop ver.)	
9	Lim Young-woong	"Trust in Me" "Hero"	
10	Doubleless	"Don't Go"	
11	Kim Soyeon	"Niagara"	
12	Kim Jae-rong	"I'm Gonna Live a Decent Life"	
13	An Seong-jun	"A Day at Sunrise"	
14	(G)I-dle	Intro + "Oh My God"	
15	The Boyz	Intro + "The Stealer"	
16	Twice	"I Can't Stop Me" (Disco ver.)	
17	Loona; The Boyz	"Blinding Lights"	Song by The Weeknd
18	Uhm Jung-hwa; Joohoney (Monsta X) feat The Boyz & Loona	"D.I.S.C.O"	
19	Kim Shin-young; Norazo	"Bread Gimme Gimme"	
20	Henry Lau	"Radio"	
21	Oh My Girl	"Nonstop"	
22	Hwasa	"LMM" "María"	
23	Hyojung (Oh My Girl); Minnie ((G)I-dle); Chaewon (Iz*One)	"Across the Universe"	Song by Baek Ye-rin
24	Kang Seung-yoon (Winner)	"25, 21"	Song by Jaurim
25	Paul Kim; Kang Seung-yoon	"Me After You"	Song by Paul Kim
26	Jessi	"Nunu Nana"	
27	Got7	Intro + "Last piece"	
28	Uhm Jung-hwa feat Hwasa, DPR Live	"Hop in"	
29	1-Shownu (Monsta X); 2-Ten (NCT); 3-Shownu x Ten	1-"Nobody Else" by Monsta X 2-"Echo"; 3-"Popstar" By DJ Khaled	
30	Monsta X Cravity; TAGO	Dance Performance + "Fantasia"	
31	Rain; Park Jin-young	"How to Avoid the Sun" "I Have a Girlfriend" "Switch To Me"	
32	Song Ga-in	"Mom Arirang"	
33	Mamamoo	"Travel" "Dingga"	
34	1-NCT; 2-WayV; 3-NCT Dream; 4-NCT 127; 5-NCT	1-Year Party Intro; 2-"Turn Back Time"; 3-"Ridin"; 4-"Kick It"; 5-"Resonance"	
35	Twice	"More & More" "Cry for Me"	
37	Song Ga-in; Henry Lau	"Music is my Life"	Song by Im Jung-hee

=== 2021: Together ===
The 2021 MBC Gayo Daejejeon was on 31 December, at Ilhosted by Jang Sung-kyu, Girls' Generation's Yoona and 2PM's Lee Junho.

Performers:

- Yang Hee-eun
- Kim Yeon-ja
- YB
- Norazo
- Sunwoo Jung-a
- 10cm
- Song Ga-in
- Mamamoo
- Red Velvet
- Oh My Girl
- Brave Girls
- Astro
- NCT 127
- NCT Dream
- NCT U
- Lim Young-woong
- Chani (SF9)
- Kino (Pentagon)
- The Boyz
- Celeb Five
- Aiki
- Stray Kids
- (G)I-dle (Miyeon, Soyeon)
- Kim Min-ju
- Hwanwoong (Oneus)
- Itzy
- Kim Dong-hyun (AB6IX)
- STAYC
- Aespa
- Lee Mu-jin
- MSG Wannabe
- Ive
- TAN
- My Teenage Girl
List of musical performances

Order	Artist	Song	Notes
Part One
1	Yoona; Lee Junho	"Señorita"	Song by Shawn Mendes and Camila Cabello
2	Song Ga-in	"Dream"	
3	TAN	"Last Chance"	
4	My Teenage Girl; Soyeon ((G)I-dle); Aiki	"Same Same Different"	Song by My Teenage Girl
5	Ive	"Eleven"	
6	Sunwoo Jung-a	"Run With Me"	
7	STAYC	"ASAP" "Stereotype"	
8	NCT U	"Universe (Let's Play Ball)"	
9	Norazo	"Buy Now Think Later"	
9	Brave Girls	"Chi Mat Ba Ram"	
10	MSG Wannabe JSDK	"Only You"	
11	MSG Wannabe M.O.M	"Foolish Love"	
12	Aespa	"Savage"	
13	Lee Mu-jin; Hwasa (Mamamoo)	"Traffic Light"	Song by Lee Mu-jin
14	Hwasa	"María" "I'm a B"	
15	Itzy	"Loco"	
16	Celeb Five; STAYC	"Whatta Life"	Song by Double V, Celeb Five, Rooftop Moonlight, Yozoh, Sunwoo Jung-a, Cheeze and Park Moon-chi
17	The Boyz	"Maverick" (Rock ver.)	
18	Yang Hee-eun; Cha Eun-woo (Astro)	"Autumn Morning"	Song by Yang Hee-eun
19	Yang Hee-eun; Solar (Mamamoo); Wendy (Red Velvet); Hyojung (Oh My Girl)	"Let's Go to Happy Land"	
Part Two
20	Seeun (STAYC); Yoon (STAYC); J (STAYC)	"Twinkle"	Song by Girls' Generation-TTS
21	Sangyeon (The Boyz); Younghoon (The Boyz); Hyunjae (The Boyz)	"Let's Go See the Stars"	Song by Jukjae
22	Bang Chan (Stray Kids); Felix (Stray Kids); Lia (ITZY)	"City of Stars"	Song by Ryan Gosling and Emma Stone
23	Miyeon ((G)I-dle); Kim Min-ju; Yeji (Itzy); Yujin, Wonyoung (IVE)	"Rum Pum Pum Pum"	Song by f(x)
24	Astro	"After Midnight"	
25	Sunwoo Jung-a; Hyojung (Oh My Girl); YooA (Oh My Girl); Seunghee (Oh My Girl)	"Dolphin"	Song by Oh My Girl
26	Oh My Girl	"Dun Dun Dance" (Disco ver.)	
27	Mamamoo	"Yes I Am" "Décalcomanie" "Um Oh Ah Yeh" "Mumumumuch"	Mamamoo medley
28	Mark (NCT); Jungwoo (NCT); Chani (SF9); Lee Know (Stray Kids); Hyunjin (Stray Kids)	"Snow Prince"	Song by SS501
29	10cm	"Go Back"	
30	10 cm Joy	"Love in the Milky Way Café"	Song by Akmu
31	Red Velvet	"Queendom"	
32	Song Ga-in	"I Like Trot"	
33	Aespa	"Dreams Come True"	
34	Stray Kids	"Only You"	Song by 2PM
35	Jacob (The Boyz); Younghoon (The Boyz); Kevin (The Boyz); New (The Boyz); Sunwoo (The Boyz); Eric (The Boyz)	"Kill This Love"	Song by Blackpink
36	Stray Kids	"Thunderous"	
37	Lim Young-woong	"My Starry Love"	
38	Kim Yeon-ja; All performers	"In the Land of Morning"	
39	Kim Yeon-ja; MJ (Astro); Jinjin (Astro); IVE	"Amor Fati"	
40	Moonbin (Astro); Juyeon (The Boyz); Q (The Boyz); Lee Know (Stray Kids); Kino (Pentagon); Hwanwoong (Oneus); Kim Dong-hyun (AB6IX)	"Tiger Inside"	Song by SuperM
41	NCT Dream	"Hot Sauce"	
42	NCT 127	"Sticker"	
43	YB	"Blue Whale"	
44	YB; Taeil (NCT); Doyoung (NCT); Jungwoo (NCT); Haechan (NCT)	"A Flying Butterfly"	Song by YB
45	All performers	"Superstar"	Song by Lee Han-chul

=== 2022: With Love ===
The 2022 MBC Gayo Daejejeon was hosted on 31 December, by Jang Sung-kyu, Im Yoon-ah and Lee Jun-ho.

Performers:

- Sumi Jo
- Yoon Jong-shin
- Jaurim
- Koyote
- Ryeowook (Super Junior)
- Younha
- Young Tak
- 10cm
- Song Ga-in
- Mamamoo
- Arin (Oh My Girl)
- Monsta X
- Moonbin & Sanha (Astro)
- NCT 127
- NCT Dream
- Yoo Taeyang (SF9)
- Choi Yoo-jung (Weki Meki)
- The Boyz
- Forestella
- Stray Kids
- (G)I-dle
- Lee Mu-jin
- Chuu
- Ateez
- Itzy
- Big Naughty
- Jeong Dong-won
- Be'O
- Kim Yo-han (WEi)
- Aespa
- Billlie
- Ive
- Kep1er
- Choi Ye-na
- Nmixx
- Tempest
- Classy
List of musical performances

Order	Artist	Song	Notes
Part One
1	Im Yoon-ah; Lee Jun-ho	"Love Never Felt So Good"	Song by Michael Jackson
2	Ive	"Lion Heart"	Song by Girls' Generation
3	Ateez (Note: Hongjoong and Mingi)	"As I Told You"	Song by Kim Sung-jae
4	The Boyz (Note: Sangyeon, Younghoon, Hyunjae and New)	"Love Light"	Song by CNBLUE
5	The Boyz (Note: Jacob, Juyeon, Q, Sunwoo); Ateez (Note: Yunho, Yeosang, San, Wooyoung)	"I Like You (A Happier Song)"	Song by Post Malone featuring Doja Cat
6	Classy	"Tick Tick Boom"	
7	Tempest	"Can't Stop Shining"	
8	Kep1er	"We Fresh"	
9	Tempest; Kep1er	"Pretty U"	Song by Seventeen
10	Jaurim	"Stay With Me" "Magic Carpet Ride"	
11	Forestella	"Lazenca, Save Us"	Song by NEXT
12	Big Naughty; 10cm	"Beyond Love"	
13	Big Naughty	"Romance Symphony"	
14	Be'O	"Nostalgia" "Love Me"	
15	Nmixx	"Dice" (Festival version)	
16	Miyeon ((G)I-dle); Lee Mu-jin	"Dangerously"	Song by Charlie Puth
17	Younha; Taeil (NCT); Haechan (NCT)	"Password 486"	
18	Younha	"Event Horizon"	
19	Doyoung (NCT); Jaehyun (NCT); Jungwoo (NCT)	"Can We Go Back"	
20	Lee Mu-jin	"Astronaut"	
21	Song Ga-in	"Reminiscence"	
22	Young Tak	"What Happened?" "MMM"	
23	Jeong Dong-won	"Baennori"	
24	Stray Kids Danceracha (Note: Lee Know, Hyunjin and Felix)	"Taste"	
25	Ive	"Love Dive" (Rock version)	
26	Jang Sung-kyu; Classy	"Sad Dream"	Song by Koyote
27	Koyote; Classy	"Pure Love" "Go"	
Part Two
1	NCT Dream	"Candy"	
2	Moonbin & Sanha (Astro); Yoo Tae-yang (SF9); Kim Yo-han (WEi)	"Love Killa"	Song by Monsta X
3	Ive (Note: Jang Won-young and Leeseo)	"Strawberry Moon"	Song by IU
4	10 cm	"Phonecert" "Gradation"	
5	Aespa	"Illusion" "Girls"	
6	Ateez	"Halazia"	
7	Itzy	"Sneakers" "Boys Like You"	
8	Song Ga-in	"All You Need Is Love"	Song by Seomoon Tak
9	Jeong Dong-won	"That That"	Song by Psy featuring Suga
10	The Boyz	"Whisper"	
11	Mamamoo	"Starry Night" "Illella"	
12	Yoon Jong-shin; Billlie	"Rebirth" "Highway Romance"	
13	Monsta X	"You Problem" "Rush Hour" "Gambler" (Rock version)	
14	Sumi Jo; Ryeowook	"I Love Seoul"	Song by Cole Porter
15	Arin (Oh My Girl); Choi Yoo-jung (Weki Meki); Yuqi ((G)I-dle); Chuu; Choi Ye-na	"Step"	Song by Kara
16	Nmixx	"Atlantis Princess"	Song by BoA
17	Stray Kids	"Circus" "Case 143"	
18	NCT Dream	"Glitch Mode"	
19	NCT	"Faster Mode"	
20	NCT 127	"Faster" "2 Baddies"	
21	Sumi Jo; All performers	"Champions"	

=== 2023 : Dream Record ===
The 2023 MBC Gayo Daejejeon was held on 31 December 2023, and was hosted by Girls' Generation's Yoona, Shinee's Minho, and Hwang Min-hyun.

Performers:

- &Team
- 2AM
- (G)I-dle
- Aespa
- ATBO
- Ateez
- Baekho
- Bebe
- BoyNextDoor
- Cravity
- Day6
- Dynamic Duo
- Enhypen
- Fantasy Boys
- Fromis 9
- Hyoyeon (Girls' Generation)
- Itzy
- Ive
- Jang Minho
- Juju Secret
- Kep1er
- Kwon Eun-bi
- Lee Juk
- Lee Young-ji
- Lucy
- NCT 127
- NCT Dream
- NCT U
- NiziU
- Nmixx
- One Top
- Paul Kim
- Riize
- Shinee
- STAYC
- Stray Kids
- The Boyz
- V1llion by 1Million
- Yoon Sang
- Young Tak
- Zerobaseone
List of musical performances

Order	Artist	Song	Notes
1	Minho (SHINee); Hwang Min-hyun	"킾은 밤을 날아서 (Flying, Deep in the Night)"	Song by Lee Moon-sae
2	Zerobaseone	"후라이의 꿈 (Fry's Dream)"	Song by AKMU
3	Nmixx	"꿈을 모아서 (Just in Love)"	Song by S.E.S
4	STAYC	"내 꿈은 파티시엘 (My Dream Patissiere)"	Song by IU
5	&Team	"Dropkick (Korean version)"	
6	Fantasy Boys	"Get It On" "Potential"	
7	ATBO	"Must Have Love"	
8	NiziU	"Paradise (Korean version)" "Heartris"	
9	BoyNextDoor	"돌아버리겠다 (But I Like You)" "One and Only"	
10	Riize	"Memories" "Get a Guitar"	
11	One Top (Note: Yoo Jae-suk, HaHa, Kim Jong-min, Joo Woo-jae, Lee Yi-kyung, and Young K)	"Say Yes"	
12	Juju Secret (Note: Park Jin-joo and Mijoo)	"잠깐만 TIME (Maybe I'm not in Love)"	
13	Cravity	"Megaphone"	
14	Lucy	"Boogie Man"	
15	Kwon Eun-bi	"The Flash"	
16	Baekho	"엘리베이터 (Elevator)"	
17	Young Tak	"폼미첬다 (Form)"	
18	Jang Minho	"아! 님아 (Anima)"	
19	Nmixx	"Soñar (Breaker)" "Love Me Like This"	
20	Kep1er	"Galileo"	
21	STAYC	"Bubble"	
22	fromis 9	"#menow" "Attitude"	
23	Lee Young-ji	"F!re" "Witch"	
24	Ahn Yu-jin (Ive); Lee Young-ji	"End of Time" "Born This Way"	Song by Beyoncé and Lady Gaga
25	Dynamic Duo	"AEAO" "맵고짜고단거 (MSG)"	
26	Dynamic Duo; Jeon So-yeon ((G)I-dle)	"Smoke"	Song by Dynamic Duo and Lee Young-ji
27	NCT 127	"Be There for Me"	
28	Paul Kim; Miyeon ((G)I-dle)	"화이트 (White)"	Song by Paul Kim
29	Stray Kids Danceracha (Note: Lee Know, Hyunjin and Felix)	"White Love" (스키장에서)	Song by Turbo
30	Hyoyeon; Bebe	"Picture"	
31	The Boyz (Note: Juyeon, Q and Sunwoo)	"Babydoll"	Song by Dominic Fike
32	Ive	"Baddie" "Kitsch" "I AM"	
33	aespa	"Trick or Treat" "Drama"	
34	Itzy	"Bet on Me" "Cake"	
35	Ateez	"미친 폼 (Crazy Form)"	
36	(G)I-dle	"퀸카 (Queencard)"	
37	NCT U	"Baggy Jeans"	
38	2AM	"This Song" (이 노래) "죽어도 못보내 (Never Let You Go)" "혹시 니 생각이 바뀌면 (If You Change Your Mind)"	
39	Young K	"오늘만을 너만을 이날을"	
40	Day6	"Zombie" "You Were Beautiful" (예뻤어) "행복했던 날들이었다 (Days Gone By)" "한 페이지가 될 수 있게 (Time of Our Life"	
41	Hyunjin (Stray Kids); Yeji (Itzy)	"River" "Play with Fire"	Song by Bishop Briggs and Sam Tinnesz
42	Yoon Sang; Riize	"달리기 (Run)"	Song by Yoon Sang
43	Zerobaseone	"In Bloom" "Crush" (가시)	
44	Enhypen	"Sweet Venom" "Orange Flower (You Complete Me)"	
45	The Boyz	"Watch It"	
46	Stray Kids	"Topline" (feat. Tiger JK) "Lalalala" (Rock version)	
47	NCT Dream	"Like We Just Met" "ISTJ"	
48	NCT 127	"Skyscraper (摩天樓; 마천루)" "Fact Check" (불가사의; 不可思議)	
49	SHINee	"Juice" "Hard"	
50	Lee Juk; All Performers	"걱정말아요 그대 (Don't Worry)"	Song by Lee Juk

=== 2024 : Wannabe ===
The 2024 MBC Gayo Daejejeon was held on 29 January 2025, and was hosted by Girls' Generation's Yoona, Shinee's Minho, and TWS' Dohoon. This year marked the 10th time Yoona hosted this event; she has also announced that this year will be the last time she will host the event.

Originally to be held live on 31 December 2024, on 30 December, a day before the event, MBC announced that the live event would be cancelled, in light of the Jeju Air Flight 2216. The event and performances would be pre-recorded, and would be aired on 29 & 30 January 2025, during the Lunar New Year period.

Performers:

- (G)I-dle
- Aespa
- Ateez
- BoyNextDoor
- Classy
- Cravity
- Day6
- Enhypen
- Fantasy Boys
- Fromis 9
- Itzy
- Ive
- Izna
- John Park
- Kiss of Life
- Lee Chan-won
- Lee Young-ji
- NCT 127
- NCT Dream
- NCT Wish
- NewJeans
- Nexz
- Nmixx
- Plave
- Riize
- STAYC
- Stray Kids
- Taemin
- Tomorrow X Together
- TWS
- Young Tak
- Zerobaseone
List of musical performances

Order	Artist	Song	Notes
Part One
1	Taesan (BoyNextDoor); Zhang Hao (Zerobaseone); Shinyu (TWS); Dohoon (TWS)	"한 페이지가 될 수 있게 (Time of Our Life)"	Song by Day6
2	NewJeans	"Attention"	
3	(G)I-dle	"Latata"	
4	Ive	"Eleven"	
5	Izna	"Izna"	
6	Kiss of Life	"Igloo" (Hunter Ver.)	
7	Nexz	"Next Zeneration"	
8	NCT Wish	"Wish"	
9	TWS	"첫 만남은 계획대로 되지 않아 (Plot Twist)"	
10	NCT Wish	"Kissing You"	Song by Girls' Generation
11	TWS (Note: Dohoon and Youngjae)	"안녕이란 말 대신 (Instead of Saying Goodbye)"	Song by Rain
12	Zerobaseone	"Mr.Mr."	Song by Girls' Generation
13	BoyNextDoor	"불장난 (Playing with Fire)"	Song by Blackpink
14	BoyNextDoor; Zerobaseone	"No. 1"	Song by BoA
15	Fantasy Boys	"분명 그녀가 나를 보고 웃잖아 (Pitter-Patter-Love)"	
16	Classy	"Psycho and Beautiful"	
17	Cravity	"Now or Never" (Piano Concerto Ver.)	
18	Plave	"Pump Up The Volume!" "Watch Me Woo!"	
19	John Park	"Bluff"	
20	John Park; Belle (Kiss of Life)	"Beauty and the Beast"	Song by Angela Lansbury
21	Young Tak	"슈퍼슈퍼 (SuperSuper)"	
22	Lee Chan-won	"하늘 여행 (A Travel to the Sky)"	
23	STAYC	"GPT"	
24	Nmixx	"별별별 (See That?)" (Band Ver.)	
25	Fromis 9	"Supersonic"	
26	Mark (NCT)	"프락치 (Fraktsiya) (feat. Lee Young-ji)"	
27	Lee Young-ji; Mark (NCT)	"Small Girl"	
28	Soyeon ((G)I-dle)	"Power"	Song by G-Dragon
29	Yuna (Itzy); Karina (Aespa); Sullyoon (Nmixx)	"Pocket Locket"	Song by Alaina Castillo
30	NewJeans	"Right Now" (Jazz ver.) "How Sweet" "Hurt"	
31	Earth Arcade Chemiz (Note: Lee Eun-ji, Mimi (Oh My Girl), Lee Young-ji, and An Yu-jin (Ive))	"Fire" "내가 제일 잘 나가 (I Am the Best)"	Song by 2NE1
Part Two
1	Riize	"으르렁 (Growl)"	Song by Exo
2	Yoon (STAYC); J (STAYC); Rei (Ive); Liz (Ive)	"Rock U"	Song by Kara
3	Yeji (Itzy); Giselle (Aespa); Julie (Kiss of Life)	"Toxic"	Song by Britney Spears
4	Zerobaseone	"Yura Yura (Korean Ver.)" "Good So Bad"	
5	BoyNextDoor	"부모님 관람불가 (Dangerous)" "Nice Guy"	
6	Riize	"Impossible" "Boom Boom Bass"	
7	Enhypen	"Brought the Heat Back" "No Doubt"	
8	Ive	"Accendio" "해야 (Heya)"	
9	Ateez	"Ice on My Teeth"	
10	Aespa	"Supernova" "Whiplash"	
11	Itzy	"Untouchable" "Gold" (New Dance Break Ver.)	
12	Doyoung (NCT)	"시리도록 눈부신 (The Story)"	
13	Taemin (SHINee); Ni-Ki (Enhypen)	"Guilty"	
14	Taemin (SHINee)	"Sexy In The Air"	
15	Day6	"Happy" "Welcome to the Show"	
16	Doyoung (NCT); Winter (Aespa)	"스물다섯, 스물하나 (Twenty Five, Twenty One)"	Song by Jaurim
17	Tomorrow X Together	"Deja Vu" (Anemoia Remix) "Growing Pain"	
18	(G)I-dle	"Super Lady" "Neverland"	
19	Stray Kids	"Chk Chk Boom" "Walkin on Water"	
20	NCT Dream	"Flying Kiss" "When I'm With You" (My First and Last Ver.)	
21	NCT 127	"No Clue" "삐그덕 (Walk)"	

=== 2025 : Cool ===
The 2025 MBC Gayo Daejejeon will be held on 31 December 2025, and will be hosted by Shinee's Minho, Hwang Min-hyun, and AllDay Project's Annie.

Performers:

- Aespa
- AllDay Project
- Ateez
- Beatpella House
- BoyNextDoor
- Cortis
- Hanroro
- Hearts2Hearts
- Idid
- Illit
- Itzy
- Ive
- Izna
- KickFlip
- KiiiKiii
- Le Sserafim
- Lucy
- Meovv
- Minho (Shinee)
- NCT Dream
- NCT Wish
- Nexz
- Nmixx
- Plave
- Riize
- Stray Kids
- The Boyz
- Tomorrow X Together
- Treasure
- TWS
- YB
- Yeonjun (Tomorrow X Together)
- Zerobaseone
List of musical performances

Order	Artist	Song	Notes
Part One
1	Ateez	"멋 (흥:興 Ver.) (The Real (Heung Ver.))"	
2	Beatpella House	"MUT Medley"	
3	Idid	"제멋대로 찬란하게 (Chan-Ran)"	
4	KiiiKiii	"딸기게임 (Strawberry Cheesegame)" "Dancing Alone"	
5	Cortis	"Deja Vu" "Fashion"	Song by Tomorrow X Together
6	Hearts2Hearts	"Style"	
7	AllDay Project	"Wicked" "Look at Me" "One More Time"	
8	KickFlip	"뭐가 되려고? (Mama Said)" "처음 불러보는 노래 (My First Love Song)"	
9	TWS (Note: Dohoon, Youngjae, and Jihoon)	"Love Shot"	Song by Exo
10	Izna	"Sign" "Racecar"	
11	Plave	"Bbuu!" "Dash"	
12	Nexz	"Beat-Boxer" (Dynamic Ver.)	
13	Illit	"Not Cute Anymore" "빌려온 고양이 (Do the Dance)"	
14	Lucy	"사랑은 어쩌고 (Where's Your Love)"	
15	Hanroro; Taehyun (Tomorrow X Together)	"사랑하게 될 거야 (Landing in Love)"	
16	Meovv	"Drop Top" "Hands Up"	
17	NCT Wish	"Color" "Poppop"	
18	Ian (Hearts2Hearts)	"Up"	Song by Karina (Aespa)
19	Bang Jee-min (Izna)	"첫 사랑니 (Rum Pum Pum Pum)"	Song by F(x)
20	Wonhee (Illit)	"좋은 날 (Good Day)"	Song by IU
21	Yeonjun (Tomorrow X Together)	"Talk to You"	
22	Le Sserafim	"Hot" "Come Over"	
23	TWS	"마음 따라 뛰는 건 멋지지 않아? (Countdown!)" "Go Back"	
24	The Boyz	"You and I"	
25	YB	"Stormborn"	
26	YB; Seungmin (Stray Kids)	"박하사탕 (Peppermint Candy)"	
Part Two
1	Hearts2Hearts (Note: Jiwoo, Juun, and A-na)	"Anymotion"	Song by Lee Hyori
2	AllDay Project	"전화번호 (Phone Number)"	Song by Jinusean
3	KickFlip	"사랑스러워 (Loveable)"	Song by Kim Jong-kook
4	KiiiKiii	"Y (Please Tell Me Why)"	Song by Free Style
5	Cortis	"Fly"	Song by Epik High
6	Idid	"순수 (Rising Sun)"	Song by TVXQ
7	Riize	"Sticky Like" "Fame"	
8	Nmixx	"Papillon" "Blue Valentine"	
9	Zerobaseone	"Iconik" "Star Eyes"	
10	Minho (Shinee)	"Tempo"	
11	Liz (Ive)	"어른 (Grown Ups)"	Song by Sondia; My Mister Original Soundtrack
12	Team 20's (Note: Han Yu-jin (Zerobaseone), Kyungmin (TWS), Ryo (NCT), Sakuya (NCT), Hyui (Nexz), Yuki (Nexz), Narin (Meovv), Ryu Sa-rang (Izna), Choi Jung-eun (Izna), Donghyeon (KickFlip), Yuha (Hearts2Hearts), Stella (Hearts2Hearts), Park Seong-hyeon (Idid))	"나에게로 떠나는 여행 (Journey For Myself)"	Song by Buzz
13	BoyNextDoor	"있잖아 (As Time Goes By)" "오늘만 I Love You (If I Say, I Love You)"	
14	Ive	"Gotcha (Baddest Eros)" "Rebel Heart"	
15	Illit	"비밀찾기 (Secret Quest)"	
16	Treasure	"Paradise" "Everything"	
17	Aespa	"Kill It" "Rich Man"	
18	Tomorrow X Together	"별의 노래 (Song of the Stars)" "Beautiful Strangers"	
19	Itzy	"Focus" "Tunnel Vision"	
20	Ateez	"Lemon Drop" "Arriba" "Django"	
21	Stray Kids	"소리꾼 (Thunderous)" "신선놀음 (Divine)"	
22	NCT Dream	"Beat It Up" "Chiller"	
23	All Performers	"Show"	Song by Kim Won-jun

== See also ==
- Show! Music Core
- KBS Song Festival
- SBS Gayo Daejeon
