= Golden Disc Awards =

Annual Korean music awards

- Current: 40th Golden Disc Awards
- Awarded for: "Outstanding achievements of the K-pop industry"
- Country: South Korea; Japan; Malaysia; China; Thailand; Indonesia; Taiwan; Vietnam
- Presented by: Ilgan Sports (until 2021); JoongAng Group (from 2022)
- Formerly called: Korea Visual and Records Grand Prize Award (1986–2000): Golden Disk Awards (2001–14)
- First award: 1986
- Website: Golden Disc Awards

Television/radio coverage
- Network: JTBC, JTBC 2, JTBC 4 (South Korea); V Live (Worldwide)

The Golden Disc Awards (Korean: 골든 디스크 시상식, formerly spelled the Golden Disk Awards before 2015) is an annual South Korean major music awards ceremony that honours achievements in the local music industry. The awards ceremony was founded with the purpose to promote popular culture creativity, discover new artists, and contribute to the growth of the music industry. The first ceremony was held in 1986. Later ceremonies have been held around Asia.

The 35th Golden Disc Awards was held on 9–10 January 2021 without a live audience due to the COVID-19 pandemic.

== History ==
From its inception in 1986, the event was called the Korea Visual and Records Grand Prize Award (Korean: 대한민국 영상음반대상) until 2001, when the event named was changed to the Golden Disk Awards. The spelling was later changed to the Golden Disc Awards in 2015.

The awards ceremony was mainly hosted in South Korea until 2012, when it started hosting in other countries in Asia.

The Golden Disc Awards trophies were designed by sculptor Kim Su-hyeon, a professor at Chungbuk National University. The trophy is in the shape of a woman playing a traditional Korean wind instrument.

== Ceremonies ==
Edition	Year	Date of ceremony	Venue	Host city	Host country	Ref.
8th	1993	12 December 1993	Grand Walkerhill Hotel	Seoul	South Korea	
9th	1994	11 December 1994	National Theater of Korea	Seoul	South Korea	
10th	1995	10 December 1995	National Theater of Korea	Seoul	South Korea	
11th	1996	8 December 1996	National Theater of Korea	Seoul	South Korea	
12th	1997	14 December 1997	National Theater of Korea	Seoul	South Korea	
13th	1998	5 December 1998	National Theater of Korea	Seoul	South Korea	
14th	1999	16 December 1999	Sejong Center	Seoul	South Korea	
15th	2000	1 December 2000	Sejong Center	Seoul	South Korea	
16th	2001	14 December 2001	Sejong Center	Seoul	South Korea	
17th	2002	13 December 2002	Sejong Center	Seoul	South Korea	
18th	2003	5 December 2003	Kyung Hee University Grand Peace Palace	Seoul	South Korea	
19th	2004	2 December 2004	Sejong Center	Seoul	South Korea	
20th	2005	7 December 2005	Sejong Center	Seoul	South Korea	
21st	2006	14 December 2006	Olympic Park	Seoul	South Korea	
22nd	2007	14 December 2007	Olympic Park	Seoul	South Korea	
23rd	2008	10 December 2008	Olympic Park	Seoul	South Korea	
24th	2009	10 December 2009	Olympic Park	Seoul	South Korea	
25th	2010	9 December 2010	Korea University Hwajung Gymnasium	Seoul	South Korea	
26th	2011	11–12 January 2012	Osaka Dome	Osaka	Japan	
27th	2012	15–16 January 2013	Sepang International Circuit	Kuala Lumpur	Malaysia	
28th	2013	16 January 2014	Kyung Hee University Grand Peace Palace	Seoul	South Korea	
29th	2014	14–15 January 2015	MasterCard Center	Beijing	China	
30th	2015	20–21 January 2016	Kyung Hee University Grand Peace Palace	Seoul	South Korea	
31st	2016	13–14 January 2017	KINTEX	Goyang	South Korea	
32nd	2017	10–11 January 2018	KINTEX	Goyang	South Korea	
33rd	2018	5–6 January 2019	Gocheok Sky Dome	Seoul	South Korea	
34th	2019	4–5 January 2020	Gocheok Sky Dome	Seoul	South Korea	
35th	2020	9–10 January 2021	KINTEX	Goyang	South Korea	
36th	2021	8 January 2022	Gocheok Sky Dome	Seoul	South Korea	
37th	2022	7 January 2023	Rajamangala Stadium	Bangkok	Thailand	
38th	2023	6 January 2024	Jakarta International Stadium	Jakarta	Indonesia	
39th	2024	4–5 January 2025	Mizuho PayPay Dome	Fukuoka	Japan	
40th	2025	10 January 2026	Taipei Dome	Taipei	Taiwan	
41st	2026	9–10 January 2027	Vietnam Exposition Center	Hanoi	Vietnam	

== Award categories ==
As of the 40th Golden Disc Awards, there were three grand prizes: Album of the Year (also known as Album Daesang), Digital Song of the Year (also known as Digital Song Daesang), and Artist of the Year (also known as Artist Daesang). Main prizes (also known as Bonsang) are awarded to multiple artists in both the Album and Digital Song categories. The grand prize winners are chosen from the main prize winners.

- Album of the Year (Grand prize)
- Song of the Year (Grand prize)
- Artist of the Year (Grand prize)
- Album Bonsang (Main prize)
- Digital Song Bonsang (Main prize)
- Rookie Artist Award
- Popularity Award
- Genre awards
- Special awards
- International Recognition Awards
- Special Recognition Golden Disc Awards
- Other awards

== Grand prizes ==
All winners are adapted from the Golden Disc Awards website.

=== Song of the Year (Digital Daesang) ===
Year	Winner	Song
2025	G-Dragon featuring Taeyang and Daesung	"Home Sweet Home"
2024	Aespa	"Supernova"
2023	NewJeans	"Ditto"
2022	Ive	"Love Dive"
2021	IU	"Celebrity"
2020	IU	"Blueming"
2019	BTS featuring Halsey	"Boy with Luv"
2018	iKon	"Love Scenario"
2017	IU	"Through the Night"
2016	Twice	"Cheer Up"
2015	Big Bang	"Loser"
2014	Taeyang	"Eyes, Nose, Lips"
2013	Psy	"Gentleman"
2012	Psy	"Gangnam Style"
2011	Girls' Generation	"The Boys"
2010	2AM	"Can't Let You Go Even If I Die"
2009	Girls' Generation	"Gee"
2008	Jewelry	"One More Time"
2007	Ivy	"If You're Gonna Be Like This"
2006	SG Wannabe	"Partner for Life"

=== Album of the Year (Album Daesang) ===
Year	Winner	Album
2025	Stray Kids	Karma
2024	Seventeen	Spill the Feels
2023	Seventeen	FML
2022	BTS	Proof
2021	BTS	Be
2020	BTS	Map of the Soul: 7
2019	BTS	Map of the Soul: Persona
2018	BTS	Love Yourself: Answer
2017	BTS	Love Yourself: Her
2016	Exo	Ex'Act
2015	Exo	Exodus
2014	Exo	Overdose
2013	Exo	XOXO
2012	Super Junior	Sexy, Free & Single
2011	Super Junior	Mr. Simple
2010	Girls' Generation	Oh!
2009	Super Junior	Sorry, Sorry
2008	TVXQ	Mirotic
2007	SG Wannabe	The Sentimental Chord
2006	TVXQ	"O"-Jung.Ban.Hap.
2005	SG Wannabe	Saldaga
2004	Lee Soo-young	The Colors of My Life
2003	Jo Sung-mo	A Singer
2002	Cool	Truth
2001	g.o.d	Chapter 4: Road
2000	Jo Sung-mo	Let me love
1999	Jo Sung-mo	For Your Soul
1998	Kim Jong-hwan	For Love
1997	H.O.T	Wolf and Sheep
1996	Kim Gun-mo	Exchange Kg. M4
1995	Kim Gun-mo	Wrongful Meeting
1994	Kim Gun-mo	Excuses
1993	Shin Seung-hun	Because I Love You
1992	Shin Seung-hun	Invisible Love
1991	Kim Hyun-sik	Kim Hyun Sik Vol.6
1990	Byeon Jin-seob	Byeon Jin-Seob 2
1989	Byeon Jin-seob	Byeon Jin-Seob
1988	Joo Hyun-mi	Joo Hyun-Mi 2
1987	Lee Moon-sae	When Love Goes Away
1986	Cho Yong-pil	Empty Space

=== Artist of the Year (Artist Daesang) ===
Year	Winner
2025	Jennie

== Main prizes ==
All winners are adapted from the Golden Disc Awards website.

=== Album Bonsang ===
Year	Winners										
2025	Riize	NCT Wish	Ive	Enhypen	Stray Kids	Tomorrow X Together	Seventeen	Ateez	G-Dragon	Zerobaseone	—
2024	Aespa	NCT Dream	Ive	Enhypen	Stray Kids	Tomorrow X Together	Seventeen	Ateez	(G)I-dle	Zerobaseone	—
2023	Aespa	NCT Dream	Ive	Enhypen	Stray Kids	Tomorrow X Together	Seventeen	Jungkook	Le Sserafim	Zerobaseone	—
2022	NCT 127	NCT Dream	NCT	Enhypen	Stray Kids	Blackpink	Seventeen	BTS	—		—
2021	NCT 127	NCT Dream	IU	Enhypen	Stray Kids	Tomorrow X Together	Seventeen	BTS	—		—
2020	NCT 127	Exo	NCT	Baekhyun	Twice	Tomorrow X Together	Seventeen	BTS	Got7	Blackpink	—
2019	Super Junior	NCT Dream	Exo-SC	Baekhyun	Twice	Monsta X	Seventeen	BTS	Got7	NU'EST	—
2018	NCT 127	Exo	Wanna One	Jonghyun	Twice	Monsta X	Seventeen	BTS	Got7	NU'EST W	—
2017	Super Junior	Exo	Hwang Chi-yeul	Girls' Generation	Twice	Monsta X	Seventeen	BTS	Got7	NU'EST W	Taeyeon
2016	Taemin	Exo	Shinee	VIXX	Infinite	Monsta X	Seventeen	BTS	Got7	—	—
2015	Super Junior	Exo	Shinee	VIXX	Jonghyun	CNBLUE	Beast	BTS	f(x)	Apink	—
2014	Super Junior	Exo	VIXX	Girls' Generation	Infinite	CNBLUE	Taemin	BTS	B1A4	Apink	Girls' Generation-TTS
2013	Cho Yong-pil	Exo	Shinee	Girls' Generation	Infinite	f(x)	Beast	B1A4	—	—	—
2012	Super Junior	Kara	Shinee	F.T. Island	Infinite	CNBLUE	Beast	B1A4	4Minute	—	—
2011	Super Junior	Kara	MBLAQ	Jay Park	Infinite	CNBLUE	Beast	f(x)	—	—	—
2010	Super Junior	BoA	Shinee	Girls' Generation	DJ DOC	—	—		—	—	—
2009	Super Junior	SG Wannabe	2PM	Drunken Tiger	Lee Seung-chul	—	—		—	—	—
2008	Shinhwa	SG Wannabe	TVXQ	Kim Dong-ryul	Brown Eyes	Rain	—		—	—	—
2007	Super Junior	SG Wannabe	Yangpa	Epik High	Wheesung	Shin Hye-sung	Big Bang	—	—	—	—
2006	Shinhwa	SG Wannabe	TVXQ	MC the Max	Shin Seung-hun	Vibe	Fly to the Sky	Son Ho-young	Buzz	Kim Jong-kook	—

Winner 1986–2005

Year	Winners										
2005	MC Mong	Koyote	Jo Sung-mo	Wheesung	SG Wannabe	Shin Hye-sung	g.o.d	Lee Min-woo	Buzz	Kim Jong-kook	—
2004	Lee Soo-young	Koyote	Shin Seung-hun	Wheesung	MC the Max	Gummy	Lee Seung-chul	Seven	Rain	Shinhwa	—
2003	Lee Soo-young	Koyote	Jo Sung-mo	Wheesung	Cool	Fly to the Sky	NRG	Wax	Lee Hyori	Shinhwa	—
2002	Lee Soo-young	Koyote	Shin Seung-hun	Park Hyo-shin	Cool	Sung Si-kyung	Jang Na-ra	Wax	Kangta	Shinhwa	—
2001	Im Chang-jung	Koyote	Park Jin-young	Kim Gun-mo	Cool	Position	Lee Ki-chan	Wax	Kangta	Shinhwa	—
2000	Kim Hyun-jung	Park Ji-yoon	Shin Seung-hun	g.o.d	Fin.K.L	Hong Kyung-min	Tae Jin-ah	Lee Jung-hyun	Uhm Jung-hwa	Jo Sung-mo	Yoo Seung-jun, Turbo
1999	Kim Hyun-jung	Sechs Kies	H.O.T	S.E.S	Fin.K.L	Seol Woon-do	Choi Yu-na	Song Dae-kwan	Uhm Jung-hwa	Jo Sung-mo	Yoo Seung-jun
1998	Kim Hyun-jung	Sechs Kies	H.O.T	Kim Gun-mo	Shin Seung-hun	Seol Woon-do	Tae Jin-ah	Kim Kyung-ho	Uhm Jung-hwa	Turbo	Kim Jong-hwan
1997	Im Chang-jung	Sechs Kies	H.O.T	Carnival	Clon	Seol Woon-do	UP	Kim Kyung-ho	Lee Ji-hoon	Turbo	Yoo Seung-jun
1996	Noise	Shin Seung-hun	Jo Kwan-woo	Kim Gun-mo	Clon	Seol Woon-do	Choi Baek-ho	Park Mi-kyung	Panic	Turbo	—
1995	Noise	Kim Jong-seo	R.ef	Kim Gun-mo	Clon	Seol Woon-do	Tae Jin-ah	Park Mi-kyung	Shin Hyo-beom	Solid	—
1994	Kim Won-jun	Shin Seung-hun	Boohwal	Kim Gun-mo	Seo Taiji and Boys	Seol Woon-do	Kim Hyeon-chul	Lim Ju-ri	Shin Hyo-beom	Choi Yoo-na	—
1993	Kim Won-jun	Shin Seung-hun	015B	Kim Gun-mo	Seo Taiji and Boys	Seol Woon-do	Kim Soo-hee	Kim Jeong-soo	Shin Hyo-beom	Lee Moon-sae	Lee Seung-hwan
1992	Kim Wan-sun	Shin Seung-hun	015B	Bom Yeoreum Gaeul Kyeoul	Seo Taiji and Boys	Seol Woon-do	Noh Sa-yeon	Yang Soo-kyung	Yoon Sang	Lee Seun-hwan, Oh Tae-ho	The Blue Sky
1991	Kim Wan-sun	Shin Seung-hun	Kim Hyun-sik	Min Hae-kyung	Kim Ji-ae	Lee Sang-woo	Noh Sa-yeon	Yang Soo-kyung	Kim Jong-seo	Lee Seun-hwan	Hyun Chul
1990	Kim Wan-sun	Joo Hyun-mi	Kang In-won, Kwon In-ha, Kim Hyun-sik	Min Hae-kyung	Na-mi	Byun Ji-sub	Tae Jin-ah	Shin Hae-chul	Lee Sun-hee	Kim Min-woo	Hyun Chul
1989	Moon Hee-ok	Joo Hyun-mi	Cho Deok-bae	Min Hae-kyung	Joo Ha-moon	Byun Ji-sub	Tae Jin-ah	Yang Soo-kyung	Lee Sun-hee	Lee Seung-chul	Hyun Chul
1988	Kim Jong-chan	Joo Hyun-mi	Kim Hyun-sik	Min Hae-kyung	Lee Nam-yi	Jung Su-ra	Jeon Young-rok	Lee Chi-hyun and His Friends	Lee Sun-hee	Lee Moon-sae	Choi Sang-soo
1987	Kim Wan-sun	Joo Hyun-mi	Koo Chang-moo	Min Hae-kyung	Na-mi	Friends	Kim Byeong-rok	Choi Jin-hee	Lee Sun-hee	Lee Moon-sae	Choi Sang-soo
1986	Deulgukhwa	Joo Hyun-mi	Koo Chang-moo	Min Hae-kyung	Lee Kwang-jo	Cho Yong-pil	Kim Soo-hee	Choi Jin-hee	Lee Sun-hee	Lee Moon-sae	—

=== Digital Bonsang ===
Year	Winners										
2025	Blackpink	Le Sserafim	Ive	Jennie	Rosé	Boynextdoor	Allday Project	G-Dragon	Zo Zazz	Aespa	—
2024	Aespa	IU	Ive	Illit	(G)I-dle	TWS	NewJeans	Bibi	Taeyeon	Day6	—
2023	Jisoo	Le Sserafim	Ive	BSS	(G)I-dle	Jungkook	NewJeans	STAYC	Seventeen	Parc Jae-jung	—
2022	Psy	Lim Young-woong	Ive	Kim Min-seok	(G)I-dle	Jay Park	NewJeans	Big Bang	—	—	—
2021	Aespa	IU	Oh My Girl	AKMU	Lee Mu-jin	BTS	Heize	STAYC	—	—	—
2020	Blackpink	IU	Oh My Girl	Mamamoo	Hwasa	BTS	Zico	Itzy	Noel	Red Velvet	—
2019	Jennie	Chungha	Paul Kim	AKMU	Twice	BTS	MC the Max	Itzy	Taeyeon	Jannabi	—
2018	Blackpink	Chungha	Bolbbalgan4	Mamamoo	Twice	BTS	Roy Kim	Big Bang	Momoland	iKon	—
2017	Blackpink	IU	Bolbbalgan4	AKMU	Twice	BTS	Heize	Big Bang	Winner	Red Velvet	Yoon Jong-shin
2016	GFriend	Lee Hi	Urban Zakapa	Mamamoo	Twice	Suzy & Baekhyun	Zico	Im Chang-jung	Taeyeon	—	—
2015	Girls' Generation	EXID	AOA	Zion.T	J.Y. Park	Sistar	Kyuhyun	Big Bang	Taeyeon	Red Velvet	—
2014	Beast	Taeyang	AOA	K.Will	Girl's Day	Sistar	Ailee	Hyuna	Epik High	Soyou & Junggigo	—
2013	Psy	4Minute	CNBLUE	Lee Seung Chul	Davichi	Sistar	Ailee	Apink	2NE1	—	—
2012	Psy	T-ara	G-Dragon	K.Will	miss A	Sistar	Secret	Big Bang	2NE1	Huh Gak	f(x)
2011	Girls' Generation	4Minute	CNBLUE	K.Will	miss A	Sistar	Secret	G.NA	—	—	—
2010	2AM	IU	CNBLUE	Lee Seung-gi	miss A	—	—	—	—	—	—
2009	Girls' Generation	Son Dam-bi	Baek Ji-young	Lee Seung-gi	Davichi	—	—	—	—	—	—
2008	Wonder Girls	MC Mong	Brown Eyed Girls	Jewelry	—	—	—	—	—	—	—
2007	Wonder Girls	SeeYa	Ivy	—	—	—	—	—	—	—	—

== Rookie of the Year Award ==
Winners are listed alphabetically by year.

Year	Winner
2025	Allday Project
2025	Cortis
2024	BabyMonster
2024	Illit
2024	TWS
2024	NCT Wish
2023	Fifty Fifty
2023	Zerobaseone
2022	NewJeans
2022	Ive
2022	Le Sserafim
2021	STAYC
2021	Aespa
2020	Enhypen
2020	Kim Ho-joong
2020	Treasure
2019	Itzy
2019	Tomorrow X Together
2018	(G)I-dle
2018	Stray Kids
2018	Iz*One
2017	Wanna One
2016	Blackpink
2016	Bolbbalgan4
2016	I.O.I
2016	NCT 127
2015	GFriend
2015	iKon
2015	Seventeen
2015	Twice
2014	GOT7
2014	Red Velvet
2014	Winner
2013	BTS
2013	Crayon Pop
2013	Lim Kim
2013	Roy Kim
2012	Exo
2012	B.A.P
2012	Ailee
2012	Juniel
2012	Lee Hi
2011	Apink
2011	B1A4
2011	Dal Shabet
2011	Boyfriend
2011	Huh Gak
2010	Sistar
2010	Secret
2010	Beast
2009	4Minute
2009	T-ara
2008	Shinee
2008	Davichi
2007	F.T. Island
2007	Girls' Generation
2007	Younha
2006	Gavy NJ
2006	Super Junior
2006	SeeYa

Winner 1986–2005

Year	Winner		
2005	Eru	IVY	Lim Jeong-hee
2004	SG Wannabe	Tei	—
2003	Big Mama	Seven	—
2002	Rain	Wheesung	—
2001	Jang Na-ra	Sung Si-kyung	—
2000	Chakra	Park Hyo-shin	Sky
1999	1TYM	Lee Jung-hyun	—
1998	Fin.K.L	S.E.S	Taesaja
1997	Jinusean	Yangpa	—
1996	H.O.T	Idol	—
1995	Sung Jin-woo	—	—
1994	Two Two	—	—
1991	Shim Sin	Yoon Sang	—
1990	Kim Min-woo	Park Sung-shin	—
1989	Jo Gap-Gyeong	Park Hak-gi	—
1988	Byun Ji-sub	Lee Tzsche	—
1987	Lee Jung-suk	Moon Hee-ok	—
1986	Kim Seung-jin	Kim Wan-sun	—

== Popularity Award ==
Year	Winner
2025	Hearts2Hearts
2025	Jin
2024	Le Sserafim
2024	Plave
2023	Jisoo
2023	Lim Young-woong
2022	BTS
2021	BTS
2020	BTS
2019	BTS
2018	BTS
2017	Exo
2016	Shinee
2015	Shinee

Winner 1986–2014

Year	Winners
2014	Beast
2014	Taemin
2014	Girls' Generation
2014	Toheart
2013	Beast
2013	Shinee
2013	Girls' Generation
2013	Roy Kim
2012	G-Dragon
2012	Shinee
2011	Super Junior
2010	Girls' Generation
2010	Shinee
2009	Super Junior
2009	Shinee
2008	Son Ho-young
2008	F.T. Island
2008	Taeyeon
2008	TVXQ
2007	Super Junior
2007	F.T. Island
2007	Girls' Generation
2007	Wonder Girls
2006	Baek Ji-young
2006	Park Sang-min
2006	Eru
2005	Jang Woo-hyuk
2005	g.o.d
2004	Park Sang-min
2004	Kim Jong- kook
2003	S
2002	Baby V.O.X
2001	Yoo Seung-jun
2001	S.E.S
2000	J
2000	Country Kko Kko
2000	Shinhwa
1999	Kim Kyung-ho
1999	Roo'ra
1999	Clon
1998	Kim Jung-min
1998	Cool
1997	Diva
1997	Untitle
1996	Kim Jong-hwan
1995	Seo Taiji and Boys
1994	Deux
1994	Choi Yeon-je
1993	Choi Yeon-je
1992	Hyun Jin-young
1992	Lee Deok-jin
1991	Shin Hae-chul
1991	Kang Susie
1990	Min Hae-kyung
1989	Kim Heung-gook
1988	Sobangcha
1987	Kim Soo-hee
1987	Yoon Su-il
1986	Cho Yong-pil

== Genre awards ==
All winners are adapted from the Golden Disc Awards website.

=== Best R&B/Hip-Hop Award ===
Year	Winner
2022	Big Naughty
2020	Changmo
2019	Zico
2015	San E

=== Best Trot Award ===
Year	Winner
2020	Lim Young-woong
2019	Song Ga In
2014	Hong Jin-young
2008	Jang Yoon-jeong
2007	Jang Yoon-jeong
2006	Jang Yoon-jeong
2005	Jang Yoon-jeong
2004	Tae Jin-ah
2003	Tae Jin-ah
2002	Tae Jin-ah
2001	Tae Jin-ah
2000	Seol Woon-do

=== Best Ballad Award ===
Year	Winner
2020	Lee Seung-gi
2018	Im Chang-jung

=== Best OST Award ===
Year	Winner	Song	Drama
2024	Crush	"Love You with All My Heart"	Queen of Tears
2020	Jo Jung-suk	"Aloha"	Hospital Playlist
2019	Gummy	"Remember Me"	Hotel del Luna
2018	Paul Kim	"Every Day, Every Moment"	Should We Kiss First?
2017	Ailee	"I Will Go to You Like the First Snow"	Goblin
2016	Gummy	"You Are My Everything"	Descendants of the Sun

=== Best Hip-Hop Award ===
Year	Winner
2018	Mino
2014	Epik High
2013	Baechigi
2012	Epik High
2010	Supreme Team
2009	Epik High
2007	Dynamic Duo
2006	MC Mong
2005	Epik High

=== Best Rock Award ===
Year	Winner
2017	Hyukoh
2015	Hyukoh
2011	F.T. Island
2010	F.T. Island
2009	Kiha & The Faces
2008	Nell
2004	Jaurim
2003	Maya
2002	Jaurim
2001	Kim Jong-seo

=== Best R&B/Soul Award ===
Year	Winner
2017	Suran
2016	Crush

== Special awards ==
All winners are adapted from the Golden Disc Awards website.

=== Best Group Award ===
Year	Winner	
2025	Monsta X	
2024	Le Sserafim	
2022	Treasure	
2021	Brave Girls	
2020	Monsta X	
2019	Mamamoo	
2018	Male	Wanna One
2018	Female	GFriend
2017	Male	BtoB
2017	Female	GFriend

=== Best Solo Artist Award ===
Year	Winner	
2024	Yuqi	
2022	Male	Be'O
2022	Female	Younha
2021	Lim Young-woong	
2020	Jessi	
2019	Hwasa	

=== Performance Award ===
Year	Winner	
2025	TWS	Izna
2022	Seventeen	
2021	The Boyz	Jeon Somi
2020	Stray Kids	(G)I-dle
2019	Astro	(G)I-dle
2016	Sechs Kies	Sistar
2014	Beast	Apink
2012	Infinite	Trouble Maker

=== Artist of the Year Award ===
Year	Winner
2022	Psy
2021	Aespa

=== Cosmopolitan Artist Award ===
Year	Winner	
2025	Ive	
2024	NewJeans	
2021	Seventeen	Aespa
2020	NCT 127	
2019	Twice	NU'EST
2018	Blackpink	Wanna One
2011	F.T. Island	

=== Next Generation Award ===
Year	Winner		
2025	KiiiKiii	—	—
2024	Kiss of Life	—	—
2023	BoyNextDoor	—	—
2020	Loona	The Boyz	—
2019	Kim Jae-hwan	AB6IX	Ateez
2015	Monsta X	—	—
2014	Tasty	Bestie	—
2012	BtoB	—	—

== Producer Award ==
Year	Winner	Ref
2023	Min Hee-jin	
2022	Seo Hyun-joo	
2020	Bang Si-hyuk	
2017	Bang Si-hyuk	
2014	Hong Seung-seong	
2011	Hong Seung-seong	
2010	Hong Seung-seong	
2009	Lee Ho-yeon	
2008	Lee Soo-man	
2007	Park Jin-young	

== International Recognition Awards ==
Year	Winner			
2022	Thai K-pop Artist	Seventeen		
2020	QQ Music Fans Choice K-Pop Artist	Exo		
2019	NetEase Fans Choice K-Pop Star	BTS		
2018	Global VLive Top 10 Best Artist Award	BTS		
2018	NetEase Music Global Star Popularity Award	BTS		
2017	Global Popularity Award	Exo		
2016	Asia Popularity Award	Kim Jae Joong		
2016	Global K-Pop Artist Award	BTS		
2015	Global Popularity Award	Exo		
2015	iQiyi Artist Award	Big Bang		Taeyeon
2014	China Good Will Star Award	Got7		CNBLUE
2014	iQiyi Popularity Award	CNBLUE		
2012	MSN International Award	Big Bang		
2011	MSN International Award	Beast		
2011	MSN Japan Award	Super Junior		
2011	Best Asian Group Award	CNBLUE		
2011	Best Hallyu Star Award	Kara		
2011	Hallyu Icon Award	Infinite	Rainbow	Supernova
2011	ViVi Dream Award	CNBLUE		
2010	MSN Asia Popularity Award	Super Junior		

== Special Recognition Golden Disc Awards ==
Year	Winner
2018	SSAW
2007	Kim Ah-joong
2003	Kang Won-rae
2002	Park Kyung-lim

== Other awards ==
Year	Award	Winners
2025	Global Impact Award	Jennie
2025	Naver AI Choice	Boynextdoor
2025	Golden Choice	ARrC
2025	Golden Choice	Close Your Eyes
2022	Most Popular Artist	Stray Kids
2022	Most Popular Artist	(G)I-dle
2020	Golden Choice	NU'EST
2020	Trend of the Year	Zico
2016	Best K-Pop Band Award	CNBLUE
2015	Best Vocal Award	BtoB
2015	Best Vocal Award	Jung Yong-hwa
2014	Trend of the Year	Soyou & Junggigo
2014	Commission Special Award	Deulgukhwa
2013	Goodwill Star Award	CNBLUE
2012	Samsung Galaxy Star Award	Sistar
2012	Golden Single Award	Teen Top
2012	InStyle Fashionista Award	Hongki
2012	JTBC Best Artist Award	Beast
2008	New Trend Award	Kim Jong-wook

== Discontinued awards ==
See Awards

Ceci Asia Icon Award

Year	Winner	
2017	Exo	Twice
2016	Exo	Red Velvet
2014	CNBLUE	
2013	Shinee	Sistar
2011	Beast	

Achievement Award

Year	Winner	
2010	Park Chun-seok	—
2009	Song Chang-sik	—
2008	Kim Chang-wan	—
2005	Cho Yong-pil	—
2004	Patti Kim	—
2003	Yang Hee-eun	—
2002	Kim Serena	—
2001	Song Dae-kwan	Ha Chun-hwa
2000	Choi Yoo-na	Clon
1999	Tae Jin-ah	—
1998	Song Dae-kwan	—
1997	Hyun Sook	—
1996	Hyeon In	—
1995	Lee Mi-ja	—
1994	Gil Ok-yoon	—
1993	Shin Hong-gyun	—
1992	Shin Hong-gyun	—
1991	Lim Jeong-su	—

Music Video Awards

Year	Award	Winner	Music video
2002	Music Video Award	Cho PD	"My Style"
2002	Popular Music Video Award	Lena Park	"In Dreams"
2002	Music Video Director's Award	Kim Nam-gyeong	"How Are You Doing?" by Hwayobi

Producer Daesang

Year	Winner
1998	Son Myeong-su – Apple Records
1997	Jang Yong-jin – SM Entertainment
1996	Park Nam-seong – Doremi Records
1995	Sa Maeng-seok – Line Sound
1994	Lee Seong-gyun – Dukyun Industries
1993	Lee Seong-gyun – Dukyun Industries
1992	Lee Seong-gyun – Dukyun Industries
1991	Jeon Gap-sin – Sorabel Records

Encouragement Award

Year	Winner	
1995	Green Area	—
1994	Kim Min-gyo	—
1993	Choi Yoo-na	Park Jeong-un
1992	Kim Kook-hwan	Moon Hee-ok

Other Technical awards

Year	Award	Winner	Song
1990	Planning Award	Eom Yong-seop	Back To You Again by Byun Jin-sub
1990	Lyricist Award	Park Joo-yeon	Back To You Again; and "It's Only Love'" by Kim Min-woo
1990	Composition Award	Ha Kwang-hoon	Back To You Again; and "It's Only Love'"

== Most awarded artists ==
=== Most grand prizes awarded ===
This list includes both Album of the Year (Album Daesang) and Digital Song of the Year (Digital Song Daesang) award winners.

Awards	Artist
7	BTS
4	Exo
3	Girls' Generation
3	Jo Sung-mo
3	Kim Gun-mo
3	SG Wannabe
3	Super Junior
3	IU
2	Byeon Jin-seob
2	Psy
2	Seventeen
2	Shin Seung-hun
2	TVXQ

=== Most awarded overall ===
Awards	Artist
31	BTS
20	Super Junior
18	Exo
16	Seventeen
15	Girls' Generation
15	CNBLUE
13	Shinee
12	Beast
12	Shin Seung-hun
12	Twice
