= Golden Oldies (TV program) =

South Korean television music show

- Title card
- Hangul: 가요무대
- RR: Gayomudae
- MR: Kayomudae
- Written by: Choi Heon; Kim Hye-jeong; Kim Bo-hyeon
- Presented by: Kim Dong-gun
- Country of origin: South Korea
- Original language: Korean

Production
- Executive producer: Shin Mi-jin
- Producers: Kim Seong-woo; Kim Young-sik; Won Jeong-jae
- Production location: South Korea
- Running time: 60 minutes

Original release
- Network: KBS 1TV
- Release: November 4, 1985 – present

Golden Oldies (Korean: 가요무대; RR: Gayomudae) is a South Korean music program for a middle-aged audience. The program's current presenter is Kim Dong-gun. Golden Oldies airs once a week, on Mondays at 22:00 KST on KBS 1TV.

== Summary ==
Golden Oldies is a music program aimed at middle-aged people to remember nostalgia and memories while singing songs and trots. It is a representative music program boasting the tradition and authority that has introduced numerous famous songs that penetrate the modern music history of Korea for 34 years since its first broadcast on 4 November 1985. Until today, during a total of 1572 broadcasts, about 23,000 singers appeared and 28,000 songs were sung. With special performances from around the world for not only domestic but also overseas compatriots from Brazil, Germany, Libya, etc., it has played a role as a channel of communication in life, comforting the longing for hometown and parents, easing the sorrows of the nation, and so on. The theme is decided for each episode, and famous singers sing old songs that fit the theme.

== Airtime ==
Broadcast channel	Broadcast period	Broadcast time	Broadcast volume
KBS 1TV	4 November 1985 – 7 April 1986	Every week Monday night 9:45 – 10:45	60minutes
KBS 1TV	28 April 1986 – 19 May 1986	Every week Monday night 9:45 – 10:45	60minutes
KBS 1TV	14 April 1986	Every week Monday night 9:50 – 10:50	60minutes
KBS 1TV	3 November 1986 – 2 November 1987	Every week Monday night 9:50 – 10:50	60minutes
KBS 1TV	5 February 2018	Every week Monday night 9:50 – 10:50	60minutes
KBS 1TV	19 March 2018 – 2 April 2018	Every week Monday night 9:50 – 10:50	60minutes
KBS 1TV	21 April 1986	Every week Monday night 10:25 – 11:25	60minutes
KBS 1TV	26 May 1986 – 27 October 1986	Every week Monday night 9:40 – 10:40	60minutes
KBS 1TV	11 September 2017 – 25 September 2017	Every week Monday night 9:40 – 10:40	60minutes
KBS 1TV	16 October 2017 – 23 October 2017	Every week Monday night 9:40 – 10:40	60minutes
KBS 1TV	6 November 2017 – 29 January 2018	Every week Monday night 9:40 – 10:40	60minutes
KBS 1TV	19 February 2018 – 5 March 2018	Every week Monday night 9:40 – 10:40	60minutes
KBS 1TV	9 November 1987 – 25 April 1988	Every week Monday night 9:45 – 10:40	55minutes
KBS 1TV	2 May 1988 – 27 February 1989	Every week Monday night 10:20 – 11:10	50minutes
KBS 1TV	6 March 1989 – 13 May 1991	Every week Monday night 10:00 – 10:50	50minutes
KBS 1TV	29 June 2020 ~ present	Every week Monday night 10:00 – 10:50	50minutes
KBS 1TV	26 May 1991 – 5 April 1992	Every week Sunday 오후 7:50 ~ 8:50	60minutes
KBS 1TV	11 April 1992 – 27 March 1993	Every week Saturday night 9:40 – 10:30	50minutes
KBS 1TV	12 April 1993 – 25 April 1994	Every week Monday night 10:50 – 11:35	45minutes
KBS 1TV	2 May 1994 – 27 February 1995	Every week Monday night 10:00 – 10:45	45minutes
KBS 1TV	6 March 1995 – 24 April 2000	Every week Monday night 10:15 – 11:00	45minutes
KBS 1TV	1 May 2000 – 1 April 2013	Every week Monday night 10:00 – 11:00	60minutes
KBS 1TV	1 September 2014 – 4 September 2017	Every week Monday night 10:00 – 11:00	60minutes
KBS 1TV	9 April 2018 – 22 June 2020	Every week Monday night 10:00 – 11:00	60minutes
KBS 1TV	8 April 2013 – 25 August 2014	Every week Monday night 10:00 – 10:55	55minutes
KBS 1TV	2 October 2017	Every week Monday night 9:20 – 10:50	90minutes
KBS 1TV	9 October 2017	Every week Monday night 9:20 – 10:20	60minutes
KBS 1TV	30 October 2017	Every week Monday night 9:40 – 11:00	70minutes

== Past hosts ==
History	Hosts	Host period	Remark
1st	Kim Dong-geon	4 November 1985 – 16 June 2003	
2nd	Jeon In-seok	23 June 2003 – 10 May 2010	
3rd	Kim Dong-geon	24 May 2010 – present	

== Previous bandmasters ==
The KBS Orchestra is active as an exclusive orchestra for the Workers and Mil-yang Arirang Song festivals, including the music stage, "Open Concert", "Who is good at".

History	Performer	Broadcast period	Remark
1st	Kim Gang-seop	4 November 1985 – March 2005	There are only two special guest conductors: Park Chun-seok (3 appearances) and Park Si-chun (4 appearances). Even though his term as the head of the KBS orchestra was over, Kang-seop Kim also served as the leader of the music stage. Probably at this time, it seems to be engaged with the orchestra leader Jang Uk-jo.
2nd	Kim Dae-woo	April 2005 – June 2019	He is the son of former KBS Radio Pops Orchestra band leader In-bae Kim, and the maternal uncle of singer Kim Pil.
3rd	Song Tae-ho	14 June 2019 – present	From 2004 to 2018, he participated as a music director and conductor for KBS's < Concert 7080 >. After the program ended, he was elected as the director of the arts and pops orchestra of the KBS Arts Troupe on 14 June 2019 through the KBS New Conductor Contest.

== The birth of Golden Oldies ==
PD Cho Eui-jin, who was in charge of a variety program called The March of Youth on KBS 1TV, said: "Let's make a music program targeting the middle-aged in the era of music show programs targeting young people." I think. At that time, KBS President Park Hyun-tae said: "The music stage should consist of good lyrics, enthusiastic singers, and a classy stage." I asked. In line with this direction of production, a program called a music stage was created. One week before the first recording, PD Cho Eui-jin thought that Kim Dong-gun the announcer, was the person who was doing the classy and savvy progress. I went to the announcer Kim Dong-gun and said, "I have a program like this, but can't you help me?" I asked for a request, but I refused it under the ground. When announcer Kim Dong-gun refused until the day before the recording, PD Cho Eui-jin said that he was ignorant. The reason for refusing was Kim Dong-Geon in the special feature of the 30th anniversary of the music stage, "PD Jo Eui-jin is a very, very expensive person. So he asked me to continue to come and watch the society, so I was doing a liberal arts program at that time, Eun-mak, I thought that young people were dancing, so I said that I didn't fit with me. I lasted for a week. Then (PD Jo Eui-jin) said, "I'll just do one day of recording today, and then after one day, from next week, then I'll find someone else. "Let's see." Go... So I couldn't do it because I was a punk. But... After that, after recording, PD Jo came down and said, "Brother, how does it feel to record it now?" I said, "Hey! I will continue with this program."

== History of Golden Oldies ==
1987 Libya Encouragement of workers at the Daesu reactor construction: When preparing to go to Libya for the performance, singer 'Hyeon-cheol' was in a group called 'Hyeon-cheol and the bees'. When <Sit but Stand or Think of You>, which I wrote for my wife, became a hit, I made people in Libya think of their homeland and family. However, even though I know the song, the singer is a faceless singer, so I wanted to know who the singer was and wanted to see it. There was a request that the singer wished to come when performing in Libya. Kim Dong-gun said he wanted to know who 'Hyeon-cheol', the protagonist of the song, was called. We got on the plane to Libya, but the host announcer, Kim Dong-gun, saw 'Hyeon-cheol' (singer) and said, "Who is this person? He said that he misunderstood'Hyeon-cheol (singer)' as a worker going to the Libya aqueduct. And since the broadcast, Hyeon-cheol, who was a faceless singer, engraved his face on the people. Hyun-cheol became a popular singer, and in 1989 he won the KBS Music Awards for Bongseon-hwa Yeonjeong (Lyrics: Kim Dong-chan lyrics; Composition: Park Hyun-jin composition; Singer: Hyun-cheol). Since then, Hyeon-cheol enjoyed the honor of winning the KBS Music Awards for two years in a row with "I Hate Hate" (Lyrics Ho-Seop Lee/Sung Hoon Park/Hyun-Cheol] Song) in 1990.

In 1988, in Los Angeles, United States, he sang <Hometown Elementary>, <San Francisco>, and <Travel Car>. In that year, Jang Se-jeong remade his <Hometown Cho>.

== Song of Golden Oldies ==
Composer Jeong Pung-song has added lyrics and songs, has been positioned as a symbol of Golden Oldies from 4 November 1985 until now, and is performing short arrangements with the opening and ending titles of the broadcast.

Song:

The voices I missed, the faces I dug to see
We gathered here again today, a flower of joy blooms
The song that was sweet, the song I wanted to hear again
Let's clap our hands freely and sing
This time to re-sing the song that you loved in memory
Each face is full of joy, every heart is full of happiness

Korean:

그리웠던 그 목소리 보고팠던 그 얼굴들
오늘 여기 다시 모였네 반가움의 꽃 피었네
정다웠던 그 노래 다시 듣고 싶던 그 노래
우리 모두 마음껏 손뼉 치며 노래 부르자
추억 속에 정든 그 노래 다시 불러보는 이 시간
얼굴마다 기쁨이 가득 가슴마다 행복이 가득

== Overseas tour ==
- 1987: Libya Encouragement of workers for the construction of a waterway
- 1988: US Los Angeles Performance
- 1990: Japan Osaka A performance at the International Flower and Greenery Fair
- 1993: Germany Celebrating the 30th anniversary of the miner at the Castrop Raoxel European Hall performance
- 1994: Brazil São Paulo Korean consolation performance
- 1996: Japan Tokyo Yoyogi Performance for the 50th anniversary of the founding of the 1st Gymnasium
- 2013: A performance in commemoration of the 50th anniversary of the dispatch of workers to the Ruhr Congress Hall in Germany and the 130th anniversary of diplomatic relations between Germany and Germany
- 2016: Brazil Performance for the 50th anniversary of immigration

== Award winning ==
- 2013 < KBS Entertainment Awards> Special Program Award (Germany Performance)

== Past crew ==
=== Producer ===
- Kang Young-won (2018 – 6 July 2020)
- Kim Kwang-soo (formerly responsible producer)
- Park Tae-ho
- Park Hwan-wook
- Park Hyo-Gyu (2017 – June 2019)
- Yang Dong-il
- Lee Jae-woo
- Joh Sung-Sook (Former Producer)
- Joh Sung-ho (2015 – March 2019)
- Joh Hyun-ah (formerly responsible producer)
- Chae Hyung-seok
- Han Ho-Seop (March 2019 – 28 October 2019)

== Past performers ==
- Episode 1684 (11 Jan 2021): [Hope 2021] Song Dae-kwan, Kim Hye-yeon, Lee Hae-ri, Jung Da-han, Hyun Sook, Moon Jeong-seon, Park Goon, Sung Eun, Park Ku-yoon, Kim Na-hee, Lee Do-jin, Park Se-bin, Yun Tae-kyu, Park Hye-sin, Kim Sung-gi, Johnny Lee, Bae Il-ho (Korean: [희망 2021] 송대관, 김혜연, 이혜리, 정다한, 현숙, 문정선, 박군, 성은, 박구윤, 김나희, 이도진, 박세빈, 윤태규, 박혜신, 김성기, 쟈니리, 배일호)
- Episode 1683 (4 Jan 2021): [With Stars] Kim Yon-ja, Sul Woon-do, Yoon Hang-ki, In Soon-i, Park Jin-young, Rain, Ha Choon-hwa (Korean: [스타와 함께] 김연자, 설운도, 윤항기, 인순이, 박진영, 비, 하춘화)
- Episode 1682 (28 Dec 2020): [Songs requested in Dec.] Yang Soo-kyung, Shin Yu, Choi Jin-hee, Jung Da-han, Lim Hyun-jung, 3ChongSa, Jo Jung-min, Moon Hee-ok, Song Hyuk, Bae Geum-sung, Kim Seong-hwan, The Barberettes (Korean: [12월의 신청곡] 양수경, 신유, 최진희, 정다한, 임현정, 삼총사, 조정민, 문희옥, 송혁, 배금성, 김성환, 바버렛츠)
- Episode 1681 (21 Dec 2020): [A song to you] Park Jae-ran, Ha Choon-hwa, Sul Woon-do, Woo Yeon-yi, Choi Young-chol, Joo Hyun-mi, Jo Myeong-seop, Ryu ki-jin, Jin Sung, Hae Soo, Ha Dong-geun, Lee Man-young, Tae Jin-ah (Korean: [당신께 드리는 노래] 박재란, 하춘화, 설운도, 우연이, 최영철, 주현미, 조명섭, 류기진, 진성, 해수, 하동근, 이만영, 태진아)
- Episode 1680 (14 Dec 2020): [When the time passes] Seo Ji-o, Park Woo-cheol, Lee Eun-ha, Chae Yoon(Lee Chae-yoon), Yoon Soo-hyun, Hyun-sook, Park Jin-gwang, Lee Ae-ran, Jang Gye-hyeon, Doo Ri, Ryu Ji-kwang, Jo Jung-min, Jo Hang-jo (Korean: [세월이 가면] 서지오, 박우철, 이은하, 채윤, 윤수현, 현숙, 박진광, 이애란, 장계현, 두리, 류지광, 조정민, 조항조)
- Episode 1679 (7 Dec 2020): [Two letters(A song with a two letter title.)] Jung Su-ra, Choi Jin-hee, Woo Yeon-yi, Heo Min-young, Park Yoon-kyeong, Kim Sang-bae, Kim Hee-jin, Song Yoo-kyung, Kim Yong-im, Wink, Choi You-na, Kim Si-a, Haeeunlee (Korean: [두 글자] 정수라, 최진희, 우연이, 허민영, 박윤경, 김상배, 김희진, 송유경, 김용임, 윙크, 최유나, 김시아, 혜은이)
- Episode 1678 (30 Nov 2020): [Songs requested in Nov.] Song Dae-kwan, Jang Yoon-jeong, Jin Seong, Kang Hye-yeon, Bae Il-ho, Shin Yu, Moon, Lee Do-jin, Kim Hye-yeon, Ko Il-seok, Sejinee, Lee Ja-yeon, James King (Korean: [11월 신청곡] 송대관, 장윤정, 진성, 강혜연, 배일호, 신유, MOON, 이도진, 김혜연, 고일석, 세진이, 이자연, 제임스킹)
- Episode 1677 (16 Nov 2020): [Love Songs of Memories] Hyun Cheol, Jang Eun-sook, Park Il-nam, Lee Jung-hee, Park Gu-yoon, Choo Ga-yeol, Joo Mi, Nam Hwa-yong, So Yu-chan, So Yu-mi, Lee Dae-heon, Kim Na-hee, Kim Chung-hun, Choi Jin-hee)
- Episode 1676 (9 Nov 2020): [Landscape of Love] Sul Woon-do, Jang Yoon-jeong, Shin Yu, Ryu Won-jeong, Kim Yon-ja, Kim Beom-ryong, Woo Soon-sil, Jo Jung-min, Moon Yeon-ju, Moon Hee-ok, Jeong Jeong-a, Hyun Dang, Kim Kook-hwan (Korean: [사랑의 풍경] 설운도, 장윤정, 신유, 류원정, 김연자, 김범룡, 우순실, 조정민, 문연주, 문희옥, 정정아, 현당, 김국환)
- Episode 1675 (2 Nov 2020): [Family of Love] Kim Hye-yeon, Shin Sung, Kang Min-ju, Bae Il-ho, Woo Yeon-yi, Jo Myeong-seop, Seol Ha-soo, Kim Soo-chan, Kang Ye-seul, Hee Seung-yeon, Yoon Ho, Lee Chae-yoon, Hong Min, Ryu Ji-gwang, Geum Jan-di, Bae Geum-seong, Han Sang-il (Korean: [사랑의 가족] 김혜연, 신성, 강민주, 배일호, 우연이, 조명섭, 설하수, 김수찬, 강예슬, 희승연, 윤호, 이채윤, 홍민, 류지광, 금잔디, 배금성, 한상일)
- Episode 1674 (26 Oct 2020): [Songs requested in Oct.] Kim Yong-im, Kwon Seong-hee, Heo Cham, Maijin, Kim Yang, Kim Dong-a, Shin Soo-ah, Han Hye-jin, Son Bin, Ahn Sung-hoon, Ban Ga-hee, Lim Hee-suk, So Ymeong + Kim Jeong-ho, Song Ga-in (Korean: [10월 신청곡] 김용임, 권성희, 허참, 마이진, 김양, 김동아, 신수아, 한혜진, 손빈, 안성훈, 반가희, 임희숙, 소명+김정호, 송가인)
- Episode 1673 (23 Oct 2020): [Nostalgic Hearts] Kim Soo-hee, Jin Seong, Ha Yoon-ju, Shin Hyo-beom, Jo Jung-min, Jang Yoon-jeong, Joo Mi, Jo Hang-jo, Han Ga-bin, Kim Eun-hye, Kim Min-hee, Tae Jin-ah, Lee Do-jin (Korean: [그리운 마음] 김수희, 진성, 하윤주, 신효범, 조정민, 장윤정, 주미, 조항조, 한가빈, 김은혜, 김민희, 태진아, 이도진)
- Episode 1672 (12 Oct 2020): [Autumn Fall] Kim Sang-hee, Choi Jin-hee, Hyun-sook, Kim Na-hee, Woo Yeon-yi, Lee Mi-bae, Lim Soo-jeong, Park Kang-soo, Moon Hee-ok, Jeong Da-han, Han Young-ju, Lee Jung-ok, Yong Yong, Park Geon (Korean: [가을 秋] 김상희, 최진희, 현숙, 김나희, 우연이, 이미배, 임수정, 박강수, 문희옥, 정다한, 한영주, 이정옥, 이용, 박건)
- Episode 1671 (5 Oct 2020): [Composers Baek Young-ho] Han Hye-jin, Jo Joong-seop, Ryu Ji-gwang, Moon Yeon-ju, Joo Young-guk, Romina Alexandra Follinus, Ryu Won-jung, Yu Ji-na, Park Hye-shin, Nam Il-hae, Shin Sung, Kim Soo-chan, Jang Eun-suk, Shin Yu (Korean: [작곡가 백영호] 한혜진, 조명섭, 류지광, 문연주, 주영국, 로미나, 류원정, 유지나, 박혜신, 남일해, 신성, 김수찬, 장은숙, 신유)
- Episode 1670 (28 Sep 2020): [Songs requested in Sept.] Jeong Su-ra, Hyun Cheol, Kim Yong-im, Oh Seung-geun, Kang Hye-yeon, Moon, Jin Si-mon, Ban Ga-hee, Hwang Min-woo, Jo Jung-min, Jang Hyun, Kim Seong-gi, Song Dae-gwan, Bae Geum-seong (Korean: [9월신청곡] 정수라, 현철, 김용임, 오승근, 강혜연, Moon, 진시몬, 반가희, 황민우, 조정민, 장현, 김성기, 송대관, 배금성)
- Episode 1669 (21 Sep 2020): [My Songs] Park Jae-ran, Jin Seong, Hong Jin-young, Sul Woon-do, Choi Jin-hee, Joo Hyun-mi, Jo Hang-Jo, Yoo Ji-na, Tae Jin-ah, Choi Yoo-na, Park Seo-jin, Woo Yeon-yi, Ha Chun-hwa (Korean: [나의노래] 박재란, 진성, 홍진영, 설운도, 최진희, 주현미, 조항조, 유지나, 태진아, 최유나, 박서진, 우연이, 하춘화)
- Episode 1668 (14 Sep 2020): [My Songs] Bae Il-ho, Kim Yong-im, Park Gu-yoon, Wink, Park Gun, Park Woo-cheol, Geum Jandi, Jin Hae-sung, Kim Hee-jin, Lee Hye-ri(Trot singer), Shin Seung-tae, Song Yu-kyung, Jung Da-han, Hyun-sook (Korean: [나의노래] 배일호, 김용임, 박구윤, 윙크, 박군, 박우철, 금잔디, 진해성, 김희진, 이혜리, 신승태, 송유경, 정다한, 현숙)
- Episode 1667 (7 Sep 2020): [River] Nam Sang-gyu, Moon Hee-ok, Jumi, Lee Dae-heon, Jo Myeong-seop, Punggeum, Lee Yong-ju, Kim Hye-yeon, Goo Na-woon, Maijin, Kim Kuk-hwan (Korean: [강] 남상규, 문희옥, 주미, 이대헌, 조명섭, 풍금, 이용주, 김혜연, 구나운, 마이진, 김국환)
