= Hyeeunyee =

South Korean singer (born 1954)

Hyeeunyee 혜은이
- Born: Kim Seung-ju (김승주); September 15, 1954 (age 71); Jeju City, Jeju Province, South Korea
- Education: Hohodon Girls' High School (Graduation)
- Occupations: Singer; Actress
- Musical career
- Genres: Trot
- Instrument: Vocals
- Years active: 1975 – present 〈 You Won't Know (당신은 모르실꺼야)〉
- Labels: Arang Entertainment
- Website: https://jbrojbro.modoo.at/?link=d0yjijdo

Hyeeunyee (Korean: 혜은이; born September 15, 1954), born Kim Seung-ju (김승주) and sometimes called "The First Nation's Little Sister" (최초의 '국민여동생') is a South Korean female singer and broadcaster.

== Career ==
At her peak in the late 1970s, she was the most popular singer in South Korea.

Popular songs include "You Won't Know", "Passion", "Gam-Soo-Kwang" (감수광), "The 3rd Hangang Bridge" (제3한강교), "I Love Only You" (당신만을 사랑해), "Teetee Pangpang" (뛰뛰빵빵), "Monologue" (독백), "Threnody" (비가), and "Blue World" (파란나라).

She belongs to Arang Entertainment (아랑 엔터네인먼트). She is the singer Yoyomi (요요미) respects most.

She debuted in 1975 by releasing an album containing the song "You Won't Know" (당신은 모르실꺼야). With her explosive vocal power and beauty, the "Hyeeunyee" (혜은이) syndrome arose. In 1977, her 2nd album I Really Really Love You (진짜 진짜 좋아해) and 3rd album I Love Only You (당신만을 사랑해) both topped the list.

She was awarded "the Best Singer Award", "Singer King" (가수왕), and "Best Popular Singer Award". She was also a leader in fashion. In addition, the title songs from her 1st to 14th albums ranked first.

She won the prize at the Pacific Music Festival in 1978. She is the original "Hallyu star" (한류스타) and was linked with actor Kim Ja-ok (김자옥). She sparked a disco craze with "The Third Hangang Bridge" (제3한강교). She led the first sister's squad and created trends in fashion and hairstyles.

Since 1977, she was invited to the broadcasting station awards ceremony seven times in a row. In 1977 and 1979, She won "the Singer King" (가수왕)" and "Best Popular Song Award" (최고인기가요상) ("I only love you", "the 3rd Hangang Bridge") at MBC's "Top 10 Singers Song Festival" (10대 가수 가요제). From 1978 to 1980s, she won the TBC "Women's Popularity Award". She was selected as the most popular singer by foreign journalists in Korea from 1977 to 1980. In 1977, She won the KBS "Music Awards (가요대상)" – "Best Popularity Award" (최고인기가수상) and the TBC "Women's Singer Award" (여자 가수상), and in the same year, she won the MBC "Entertainment Awards" (연예대상) in the "Singer Category", and in 1977, She won all the Korean singer awards.

Even in the 2000s, she is consistently loved by the public and often appears on the KBS 1TV "Golden Oldies" (가요무대).

== Albums ==
List of albums:

- You Won't Know – 1 December 1975
- I Really Really Like You – June 1977 (Teetee Pangpang)
- I Love Only You – July 1977
- Christmas and Happy New Year – November 1977 (Carol/Basic 4th album)
- Forever, Seoul – December 1977 (Gam-Soo-Kwang)
- Forever Only You – August 1978 (Seogwipo's Dream)
- The 3rd Hangang Bridge – March 1979 (I Am You)
- Dawn Rain – August 1979 (Migratory Birds)
- Graduation – December 1979 (I don't cry)
- Regrets – June 1980 (Remembrance)
- The Stone Wall of Old Love – December 1980 (You and Me)
- Please Forget – August 1981 (Child Without Mother)
- Monologue – October 1982 (Jealousy)
- Little Lady – August 1983 (Children)
- End of Breakup – July 1984 (Okay)
- Passion – September 1985 (Blue World)
- Past History – January 1987 (Pinocchio)
- Threnody – March 1989 (You Like the Wind)
- My Man – July 1990 (Lost Memories)
- Traces of the wind – October 1992 (I am a woman)
- Standing in this darkness and looking at the sky – November 1995
- I have to be strong – December 2006 (Still)
- Tear's Well – May 2015 (Loneliness Comes)
- Yeah – April 2020 (Reunion) released

== Drama ==
- Why are you doing that - MBC 1977
- Detective Kim, Detective Kang - MBC 1990)
- Hello - SBS 1995)
- Corporal Oh - SBS 1996)
