= Jo Jung-min =

South Korean singer

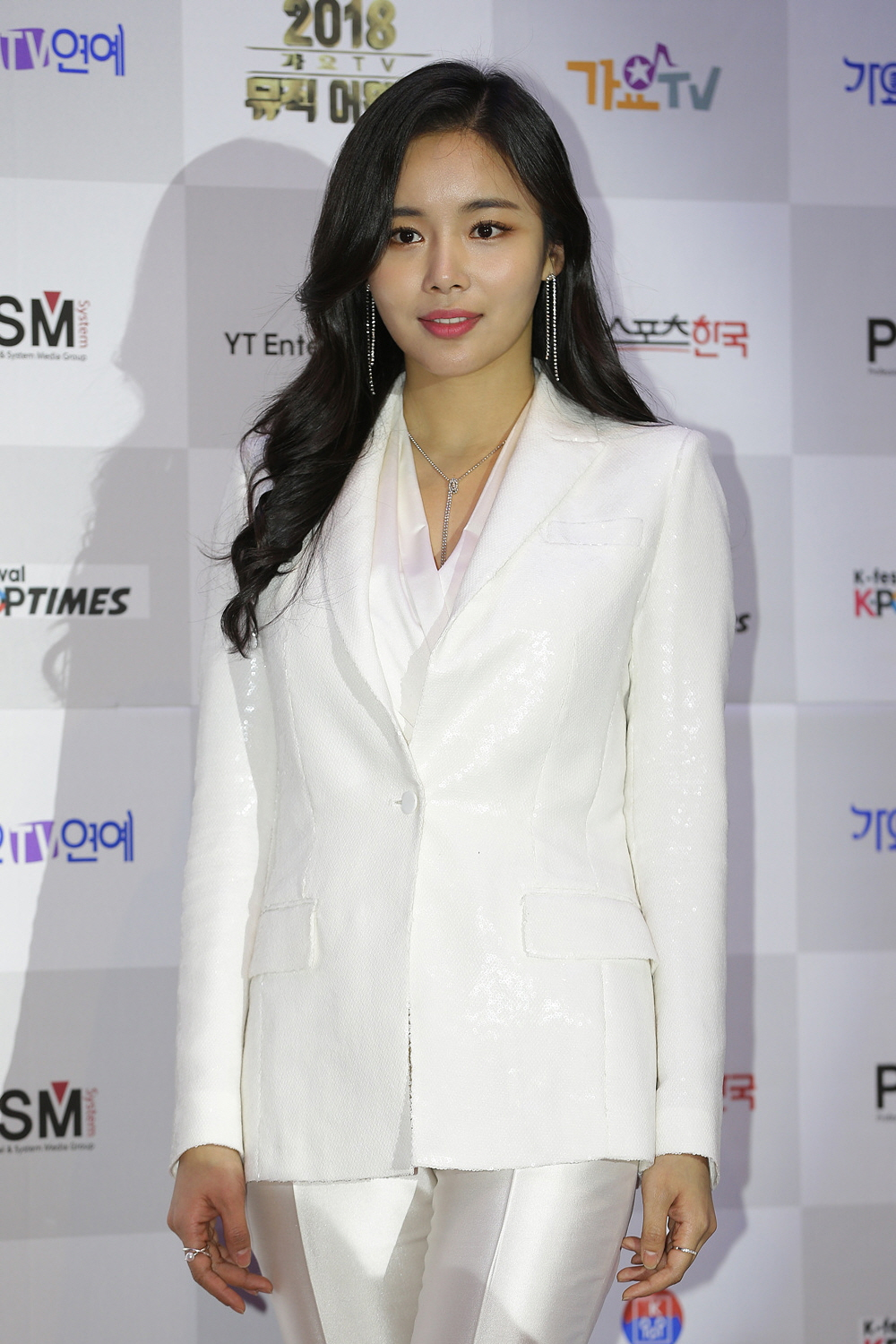
- 2018 Gayo TV Entertainment Music Awards

Background information
- Born: Jo Jung-min; Seoul, South Korea
- Genres: K-pop; Trot; Ballad; Dance; R&B
- Occupations: Singer-songwriter; actress; Singer
- Instruments: Vocals, Piano
- Years active: 2009–present
- Labels: South Korea: KNC Music; Japan: Sony Music Entertainment
- Website: https://cafe.naver.com/trotmin

Korean name
- Hangul: 조정민
- Hanja: 曺廷旼
- RR: Jo Jeongmin
- MR: Cho Chŏngmin

Jo Jung-min (Korean: 조정민) is a South Korean singer, actress, pianist and singer-songwriter.

She debuted as a trot singer in 2009, releasing the regular album Jeom Jeom Jeom (점 점 점) under the stage name Joah (조아), but stopped working after six months. Later, she resumed her career as a trot singer, returning to the music industry in 2014 under her real name, Jo Jung-min. Since 2018, she has been singing enka and more in Japan. As of 2022, she is often on stage singing while playing her piano, which is her own major, and she is also working on arranging songs that mix trot and other genres. She also works as a film and musical actress, as well as a magazine and advertising model. She became interested in trot after being attracted by singer Jang Yoon-jeong's songs, and fell in love with singer-songwriter Sim Soo-bong singing trot while playing the piano. And she says she wants to become 'the Beethoven of the trot world'.

== Debut ==
On September 8, 2009, under the stage name Joah, she released her regular album Jeom Jeom Jeom, and debuted as a trot singer. She took a hiatus after six months, but returned in 2014, operating under her real name, Jo Jung-min. She officially debuted on December 10, 2014, with the release of the EP Be My Love.

== Albums ==
List of albums:

=== Regular ===
- 2009.09.08. Joah's 1st album Jeom Jeom Jeom (점 점 점) Tracks 〈Chinatown〉 (차이나타운), 〈Jeom Jeom Jeom〉, 〈Telephone〉 (전화), 〈What to do〉 (어떡하라구)

=== Single, EP ===
- 2014.12.10. EP Be My Love Tracks 〈Gomtangi〉 (곰탱이),〈Song of the day〉 (하루가),〈Gomtangi (Polka Ver.)〉
- 2015.05.27. Single Jo Jeong-Min Digital Single (Sway) Tracks 〈SallangSallang〉 (살랑살랑), 〈SallangSallang (Nu Jazz Ver.)〉
- 2016.02.17. EP Superman Tracks 〈Superman〉, 〈Woman Like That〉 (그런 여자), 〈One Star, Two Stars〉 (별 하나 별 둘)
- 2018.07.20. EP Did You Eat (식사하셨어요) tracks 〈Did You Eat〉, 〈Andante〉, 〈Did You Eat (Piano Ver.)〉
- 2019.04.24. EP Drama Tracks 〈Ready Q〉, 〈Chaola (Holy night)〉 (차올라), 〈Kiss me〉, 〈Goodbye〉, 〈Love flower〉 (사랑꽃)
- 2020.08.19. Single <Be Mine> (내꺼해줘요) track <Be Mine>
- 2021.11.23. Single Longer Stay (오래 있어줘) Jo Jung-min X Ark (조정민 x 아크), track 〈Longer Stay〉
- 2022.01.27. Single Don't Grab Your Ankle (발목을 잡지마) track 〈Don't Grab Your Ankle〉
- 2022.11.03. Single Parallel Line (평행선) track 〈Parallel Line〉
- 2022.12.26. EP End, And tracks 〈Why go〉 (왜 가), 〈Letter that can't be sent〉 (부치지 못할 편지), 〈Love that was not there〉 (없던 사랑)

=== Original soundtrack ===
- 2016.04.30. Gahwamansaseong OST Part.5 (가화만사성 OST Part.5) track 〈A Bittersweet Life〉 (달콤한 인생)
- 2016.08.13. Gahwamansaseong OST (가화만사성 OST) track 〈A Bittersweet Life〉 (달콤한 인생)

=== Compilation ===
- 2015.02.28. Immortal Songs - Singing the Legend (Kim Soo-hee Edition) (불후의 명곡 - 전설을 노래하다 (김수희 편)) track <Station>
- 2015.04.18. Immortal Songs - Singing the Legend (Park Seong-hoon & Park Hyun-jin Episode 2) ((불후의 명곡 - 전설을 노래하다 박성훈&박현진 2편))〈Love must be a butterfly〉
- 2015.09.12. Immortal Songs - Singing the Legend (Joo Young-Hoon Episode 1) (불후의 명곡 - 전설을 노래하다 (주영훈 1편) B-side song 〈Festival〉
- 2015.12.20. King of Mask Singer Episode 38 (복면가왕) B-side song 〈Don't Leave Me (Rudolph Eight Heads)〉 (날 떠나지 마)
- 2020.02.06. I am a trot singer Part1 (나는 트로트 가수다 Part1) track 〈Seoul Tango〉 (서울탱고)
- 2020.02.13. I am a trot singer Part2 (나는 트로트 가수다 Part2) B-side song 〈Million Roses〉 (백만송이 장미)
- 2020.08.08. Immortal Songs – Singing the Legend (Lyricist Kim Eana) (불후의 명곡 - 전설을 노래하다 (작사가 김이나 편)) B-side song 〈Abracadabra〉
- 2020.10.16. Call Center of Love PART27 (사랑의 콜센터 Part27) track 〈Singing and Dancing〉 (노래하며 춤추며)
- 2020.10.17. Immortal Songs – Singing the Legend (Trot Men and Women Competition Special) (불후의 명곡 - 전설을 노래하다 (트롯 남녀 대전 특집)) track 〈I hate you〉 (미워요)
- 2020.11.28. Immortal Songs - Trot National Sports Festival Special Part 2 (불후의 명곡 - 전설을 노래하다 트롯 전국체전 특집 2부)) track 〈Amor Party〉 (아모르파티)
- 2021.04.17. Immortal Songs - Trot National Sports Festival Coach Player Competition Part 1 (불후의 명곡 - 전설을 노래하다 트롯 전국체전 코치 선수 대항전 1부) Track 〈10 MINUTES〉

== Television ==
- 2014. MBC Song's World (가요시대) Guest
- 2015. ~ KBS 1TV Golden Oldies (가요무대) Guest Singer
- 2015 / 2020 MBC Mystery Music Show King of Mask Singer (미스터리 음악쇼 복면가왕), 8-headed Rudolph / I hope you believe in me ~ / I'm your Singer S.E.S
- 2016. JTBC Knowing Bros (아는 형님), Chuseok Special Episodes 41~42
- 2017. ~ National TOP 10 Song Show (전국 TOP 10 가요쇼) Guest Singer
- 2018. MBC sports+ 7 out of 8 queue season 1 (7전 8큐 시즌1), fixed guest
- 2018. MBC sports+ 7 out of 8 queue season 2 (7전 8큐 시즌2), fixed guest
- 2018. ~ MBC Best Songs (가요베스트) 564th Jinju Part 1
- 2019. Screen Golf Zone TV Hey! Jung-min? Play Golf (정민아 골프치자), Main MC
- 2019. OBS Gyeongin Broadcasting Music Tank (뮤직 탱크), main MC, military consolation performance
- 2019. ~ 2021. MBC Chungbuk The Trot (더 트로트), Main MC
- 2020. KBS 2TV New Release Side-Restaurant (신상출시 편스토랑), fixed appearance from episode 29
- 2020. TV Chosun I will sing the requested song - Call Center of Love (노래를 불러드립니다 - 사랑의 콜센타) Episode 27, Guest
- 2020. KBS 2TV Immortal Song - Singing the Legend ( (불후의 명곡 - 전설을 노래하다)) Guest
- 2021. ~ SBS F!L, MTV The Trot Show (더 트롯쇼) Guest Singer

== Radio ==
- 2022. TBS Choi Il-gu's Hurricane Radio (최일구의 허리케인 라디오) 'Dessert Show After Lunch - I'm a Singer', Guest
- 2022.02.07. ~ 05.24. TBS Choi Il-goo's Hurricane Radio (최일구의 허리케인 라디오) 'Guests come, come, SHOW!' ((손님온다 어서오옵SHOW)), fixed guest
- 2022. TBN Gyeongin Traffic Broadcasting TBN Cha Cha Cha (TBN 차차차), Guest

== Drama ==
- 2015 web drama Beginning of the Beginning (처음의 시작), Role as Yoonhee (윤희)
- 2016 web drama Beauty Salon M (뷰티살롱 M), role of Miji (미지)
- 2017 web drama Beauty Salon M - Mask (뷰티살롱 M - Mask), role of Jinee (지니)

== Film ==
- 2020 Yoga Academy: Kundalini of Death (요가학원: 죽음의 쿤달리니), role Miyeon (미연)

== Musical ==
- 2022.05.13. ~ 2022.08.07. Volume Up (볼륨업) (Seoul Forest Galleria Foret), as Jeong Chae-eun (정채은)
- 2022.09.02. ~ 2023.01.08. Volume Up (볼륨업) (Seoul Forest Theater 1)

== Model ==
- 2019. Cover model for the January issue of the men's magazine MAXIM (맥심)
- 2021. Danish brand Mateus (마테우스) main model
- 2022. Egg Pay Co., Ltd. Caddy Pay (캐디페이) PR model

== MC, DJ ==
- 2021. MBC Chungbuk The Trot (더 트로트) Main MC

== Awards ==
- 2015. 23rd Korea Culture and Entertainment Awards (제23회 대한민국문화연예대상) Adult song category, Rookie Award
- 2016. Proud Koreans Who Shine Korea Grand Prize (한국을 빛낸 자랑스런 한국인 대상) Grand prize for the most popular live singer selected by the reporter
- 2016. MBC Gayo Best Grand Festival (MBC가요베스트 대제전) Rookie Award
- 2017. Best Song Show Grand Festival (베스트가요쇼 대축제) Rookie Award
- 2017. 2017 Korea Proud Korean Grand Prize (2017 대한민국 자랑스러운 한국인 대상) Rookie Award
- 2018. Gayo TV Music Awards (가요TV 뮤직 어워즈) Runner-up Singer Award
- 2018. The 8th Korea Hallyu Grand Prize (제8회 대한민국한류대상) Overseas Rising Star Award
- 2019. The 7th Korea Marketing Grand Prize (제7회 대한민국마케팅대상) Tomorrow's Star Award
- 2019. Popket Asia Music Awards (팝켓 아시아 뮤직 어워드) Popularity Award

== School ==
- 'Kaywon Arts High School' Graduated from Department of Music (Piano Major)
- Kookmin University Bachelor of Arts, Department of Music (Piano Major)

== Other activities ==
- 2022.05.26. Korea Coast Guard Public Relations Ambassador
- 2022.06.29. Korea Army Association Public Relations Ambassador
- 2022.11.11. The 43rd Seoul Dance Festival Ambassador
