= Kim Soo-hee =

South Korean singer (born 1953)

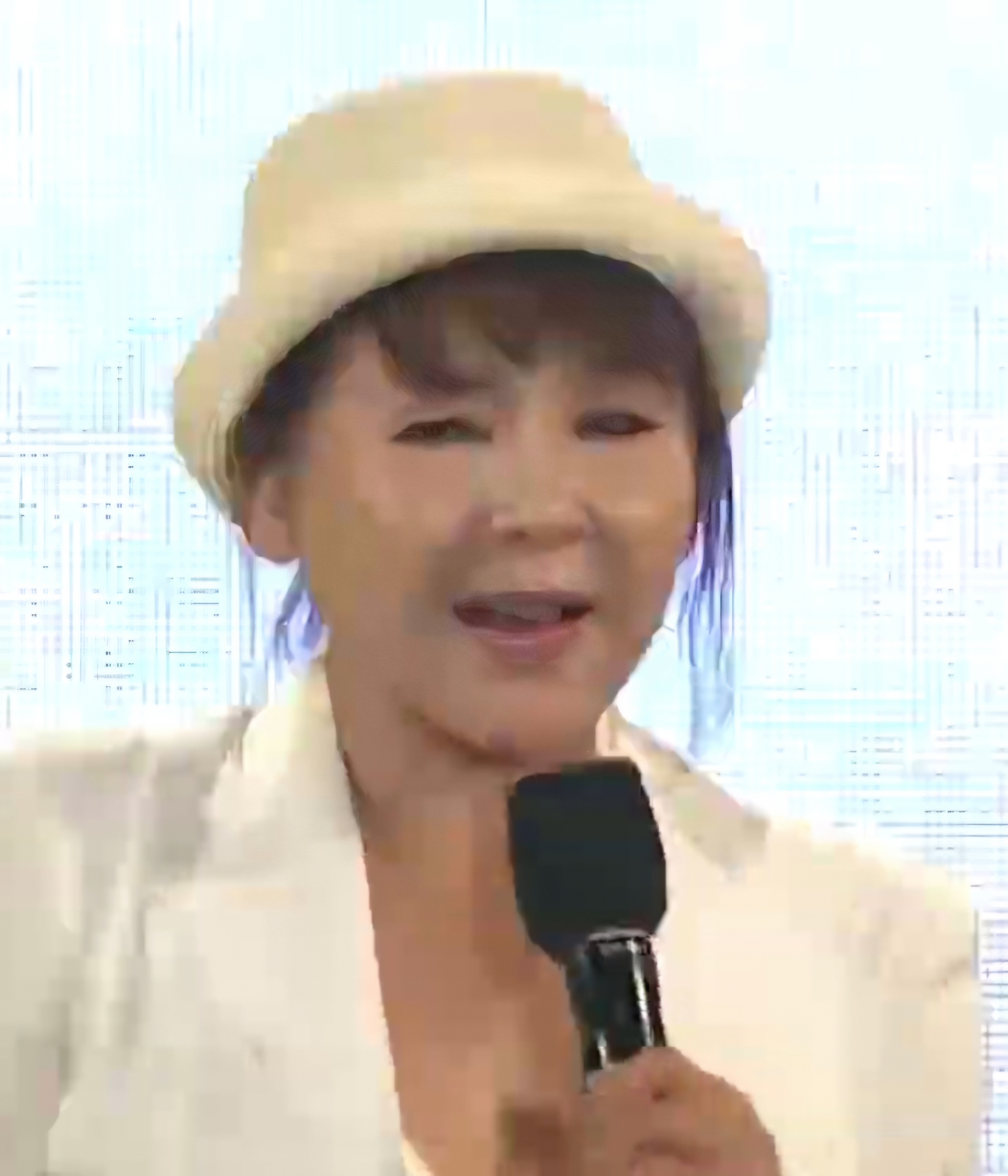
- Kim in 2018
- Born: Kim Hee-soo; 13 March 1953 (age 73); Busan, South Korea
- Occupations: Singer; lyricist; composer; novelist; film director
- Years active: 1970–present
- Musical career
- Genres: Rock music; Blues rock; Pop music; Trot
- Instrument: Guitar

Korean name
- Hangul: 김희수
- Hanja: 金姬秀
- RR: Gim Huisu
- MR: Kim Hŭisu

Stage name
- Hangul: 김수희
- Hanja: 金秀姬
- RR: Gim Suhui
- MR: Kim Suhŭi

Kim Soo-hee (Korean: 김수희; born 13 March 1953), birth name Kim Hee-soo, is a South Korean female singer.

== Filmography ==
=== Television shows ===
Year	Title	Role	Notes	Ref.
2021	Hello Trot	Judge		
2022	Our Trot	Cast Member	Chuseok specials	

== Awards ==
Year	Award	Category	Nominated work	Result	Ref.
1986	Golden Disc Awards	Main Prize (Bonsang)	"Don't Go Now" (지금은 가지 마세요)	Won	
1987	Golden Disc Awards	Popularity Award	"Don't Go Now" (지금은 가지 마세요)	Won	
1993	Golden Disc Awards	Main Prize (Bonsang)	"Sad Love" (애모)	Won	
1993	KBS Gayo Daesang	Grand Prize (Daesang)	"Sad Love" (애모)	Won	
1993	MBC Gayo Daejejeon	Most Popular Song	"Sad Love" (애모)	Won	
1993	Seoul Music Awards	Main Prize (Bonsang)	"Sad Love" (애모)	Won	
1994	Korean Entertainment Art Awards	Trot Award	—N/a	Won	
2005	Korean Entertainment Art Awards	Presidential Commendation	—N/a	Won	
2015	Korean Entertainment Art Awards	Grand Prize (Daesang)	—N/a	Won	
