= Song Ga-in =

South Korean singer (born 1986)

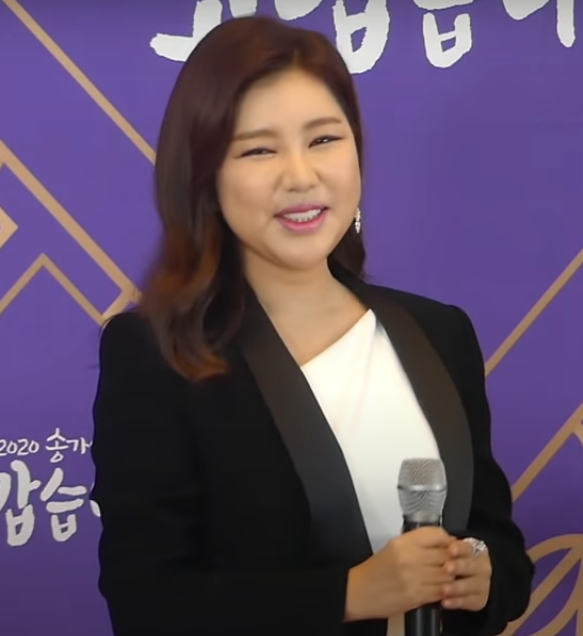
- Song in January 2020

Background information
- Born: Jo Eun-sim; December 26, 1986 (age 39); Jindo County, South Jeolla Province, South Korea
- Genre: Trot
- Occupations: Singer, MC
- Years active: 2012–present
- Label: PocketDol Studio

Korean name
- Hangul: 조은심
- Hanja: 曺恩心
- RR: Jo Eunsim
- MR: Cho Ŭnsim

Stage name
- Hangul: 송가인
- Hanja: 宋歌人
- RR: Song Gain
- MR: Song Kain

Jo Eun-sim (Korean: 조은심; born December 26, 1986), better known by her stage name, Song Ga-in (Korean: 송가인), is a South Korean female trot singer. She is the winner of the 2019 reality television show Miss Trot. She often appears on KBS' Golden Oldies.

== Early life and education ==
Song was born Jo Eun-shim on December 26, 1986, in Jindo County, South Jeolla Province, South Korea. Her mother, Song Sun-dan, teaches Jindo ssitgimgut, a shaman exorcism ritual that is classified as one of South Korea's "Intangible Cultural Properties." Her older brother, Jo Seong-jae, is a member of the traditional Korean music group Baraji.

Song began singing traditional pansori when she was in middle school and later attended Gwangju Arts High School. She majored in traditional Korean music at Chung-Ang University.

== Personal life ==
Song's one-person firm Gaindal Entertainment (가인달엔터테인먼트), set up in September 2024, was reported in September 2025 to have no popular-culture planning-business registration. Coverage treated that as a suspected breach of the Popular Culture and Arts Industry Development Act (up to two years' imprisonment or a ₩20 million fine) and noted that her older brother was listed as an inside director. JG Star, which held her exclusive contract and handled publicity and management, said it was already registered, that Song had signed with JG Star while forming the one-person company, and that the gap had not been noticed. Gaindal said it would complete registration quickly.

== Discography ==
=== Studio albums ===
Title	Album details	Peak chart positions	Sales
Title	Album details	KOR	Sales
Hanggu Agassi (항구 아가씨) released as Jo Eun-sim	Released: May 13, 2016; Label: Cooking Music; Formats: CD, digital download	—	—N/a
Beautiful Woman (佳人)	Released: November 4, 2019; Label: PocketDol Studio; Formats: CD, digital download	10	KOR: 24,487
Mong (몽(夢))	Released: December 26, 2020; Label: PocketDol Studio; Formats: CD, digital download	—	—N/a
The Song of Love (연가 (戀歌))	Released: April 21, 2022; Label: PocketDol Studio; Formats: CD, digital download	17	KOR: 11,643
Gain;Dal (가인;달)	Released: February 11, 2025; Label: Gaindal Entertainment, JG Star; Formats: CD, digital download	12	KOR: 22,731
"—" denotes release did not chart.

=== Live albums ===
Title	Album details
Song Ga-in – Miss Trot Live	Released: October 8, 2019; Label: Superstar Record; Formats: CD, digital download
2023 Song Ga-in Best & Live	Released: September 22, 2023; Label: Pocket Doll Studio; Formats: CD, digital download

=== Compilation albums ===
Title	Album details
"Forever" [Goodbye Jin,Sun,Mi] collaboration with Jung Mi-ae & Hongja	Released: November 21, 2020; Label: PocketDol Studio; Formats: CD, digital download

=== Single albums ===
Title	Album details	Peak chart positions	Sales
Title	Album details	KOR	Sales
Not a Flower (꽃이 아니면 어떤가)	Released: July 2, 2026; Label: Gaindal Entertainment, JG Star; Formats: CD, digital download	35	KOR: 3,696

=== Singles ===
Title	Year	Peak chart positions	Album
Title	Year	KOR	Album
As lead artist
"Breeze From the Mountain and River" (산바람아 강바람아) released as Jo Eun-sim	2012	—	Non-album singles
"Love Song" (사랑가) released as Jo Eun-sim	2012	—	Non-album singles
"Hanggu Agassi" (항구 아가씨) released as Jo Eun-sim	2016	—	Hanggu Agassi
"Seongsan Ilchulbong" (성산 일출봉) released as Jo Eun-sim	2016	—	Hanggu Agassi
"Up To There" (거기까지만)	2017	—	Non-album singles
"Take It" (찍어)	2019	— (Note: "Hwaryu Chunmong" didn't enter Gaon Digital Chart, but peaked 199 position on the Gaon Download Chart)	Non-album singles
"Mom Arirang" (엄마아리랑)	2019	177	Beautiful Woman
"The Goodbye Train" (이별의 영동선)	2019	— (Note: "Hwaryu Chunmong" didn't enter Gaon Digital Chart, but peaked 17 position on the Gaon Download Chart)	Beautiful Woman
"Hwaryu Chunmong" (花柳春夢)	2020	— (Note: "Hwaryu Chunmong" didn't enter Gaon Digital Chart, but peaked 55 position on the Gaon Download Chart)	Non-album singles
"Hwaryu Chunmong (Chapter 1, Chapter 2)" (花柳春夢(1막2장))	2020	— (Note: "Hwaryu Chunmong" didn't enter Gaon Digital Chart, but peaked 133 position on the Gaon Download Chart)	Non-album singles
"Farewell Bus Stop" (이별의 버스 정류장) with Yoo San-seul	2020	114	Farewell Bus Stop
"Just Gamma" (확 감아버려)	2020	— (Note: "Hwaryu Chunmong" didn't enter Gaon Digital Chart, but peaked 71 position on the Gaon Download Chart)	Non-album single
"I Like Trot" (이별의 버스 정류장)	2020	—	Mong
"Dream" (꿈(夢))	2020	—	Mong
"Rainy Mt. Geumgang" (비 내리는 금강산)	2022	—	The Song of Love
"Reminiscence" (기억 저편에)	2022	—	The Song of Love
"With You" (당신을 만나) (with Kim Ho-joong)	2023	50	Non-album single
As featured artist
"Fame" (인기) MC Mong feat. Song Ga-in, Chancellor	2019	1	Channel 8
"—" denotes release did not chart.

=== Soundtrack appearances ===
Title	Year	Peak chart positions	Album
Title	Year	KOR	Album
"Pictures of My Heart" (내 마음의 사진)	2020	35	Crash Landing on You OST

=== Compilation appearances ===
Title	Year	Peak chart positions	Album
Title	Year	KOR	Album
"Yongdusan Elegy" (용두산 엘레지)	2019	—	Miss Trot DEATH MATCH
"Han Manheun Daedonggang" (한 많은 대동강)	2019	—	Miss Trot DEATH MATCH II
"Yeongdong Buleuseu" (영동 부르스)	2019	—	Miss Trot LEGEND MISSION
"Jin Jeong Ingayo" (진정인가요) with So U Kim	2019	—	Miss Trot LEGEND MISSION II
"Nameless Actress" (무명배우)	2019	— (Note: "Nameless Actress" didn't enter Gaon Digital Chart, but peaked 112 position on the Gaon Download Chart)	Miss Trot FINAL STAGE
"Brokenhearted Miari Gogae" (단장의 미아리 고개)	2019	—	Miss Trot FINAL STAGE
"My Love" (님아) with Yoon Min-soo & Cheetah	2019	175	The Call 2 Project No.4
"The Love I Committed" (내가 저지른 사랑)	2019	—	Immortal Songs: Singing the Legend (A hot love story that resonates with the heart, Lim Chang-jung 2)
"Don't Worry" (건강하고 아프지마요) with Yoon Min-soo, Cheetah & Baekho	2019	— (Note: "Don't Worry" didn't enter Gaon Digital Chart, but peaked 34 position on the Gaon Download Chart)	The Call 2 Final Project

== Filmography ==
=== Film ===
Year	Title	Role	Notes	Ref.
2022	Cicada Sori	Singer	Special appearance	

=== Television series ===
Year	Title	Role	Notes	Ref.
2020	Zombie Detective	Gopchang House Singer	Cameo	

=== Television shows ===
Year	Title	Role	Ref.
2019	Miss Trot	Herself/contestant	
2019	Mom's Taste	Herself	
2021	Joseon Top Singer	judges	
2022	Fantastic Family	Participant	
2022	Take the Blessings	Regular Member	

=== Web shows ===
Year	Title	Role	Notes	Ref.
2022	Saturday Night Live Korea	Host	Season 2 – Episode 19	

== Ambassadorship ==
- Public Relations Ambassador for the Korean Cultural Heritage Foundation (2022)
- Hanbok Ambassador (2022)
- 2022 Incheon International Airport Honorary Gatekeeper (2022)

== Awards and nominations ==
Year	Award	Category	Nominated work	Result	Ref.
2019	Soribada Best K-Music Awards	Rookie Award (Trot)	—N/a	Won	
2019	Korean Popular Culture and Arts Awards	Minister of Culture, Sports and Tourism Commendation	—N/a	Won	
2019	19th MBC Entertainment Awards	Rookie Award in Variety Category (Female)	Omniscient Interfering View	Nominated	
2019	34th Golden Disc Awards	Best Trot	—N/a	Won	
2020	2020 Trot Awards	Best New Artist	—N/a	Won	
2020	2020 Trot Awards	Popularity Award (Female)	—N/a	Won	
2020	18th KBS Entertainment Awards	Rookie Award in Show/Variety Category	Trot National Festival	Nominated	
2021	Brand of the Year Awards	Female Trot Singer	—N/a	Won	
2021	Asia Artist Awards	Female Solo Singer Popularity Award	Song Ga-in	Nominated	
2021	19th KBS Entertainment Awards	Popularity Award	Trot Magic	Won	

=== Listicles ===
Name of publisher, year listed, name of listicle, and placement
Publisher	Year	Listicle	Placement	Ref.
Forbes Korea	2020	Korea Power Celebrity	11th	
Forbes Korea	2023	Korea Power Celebrity	39th	
Gallup Korea	2024	Korea's Favorite Singer	8th	
