= Joo Hyun-mi =

South Korean singer

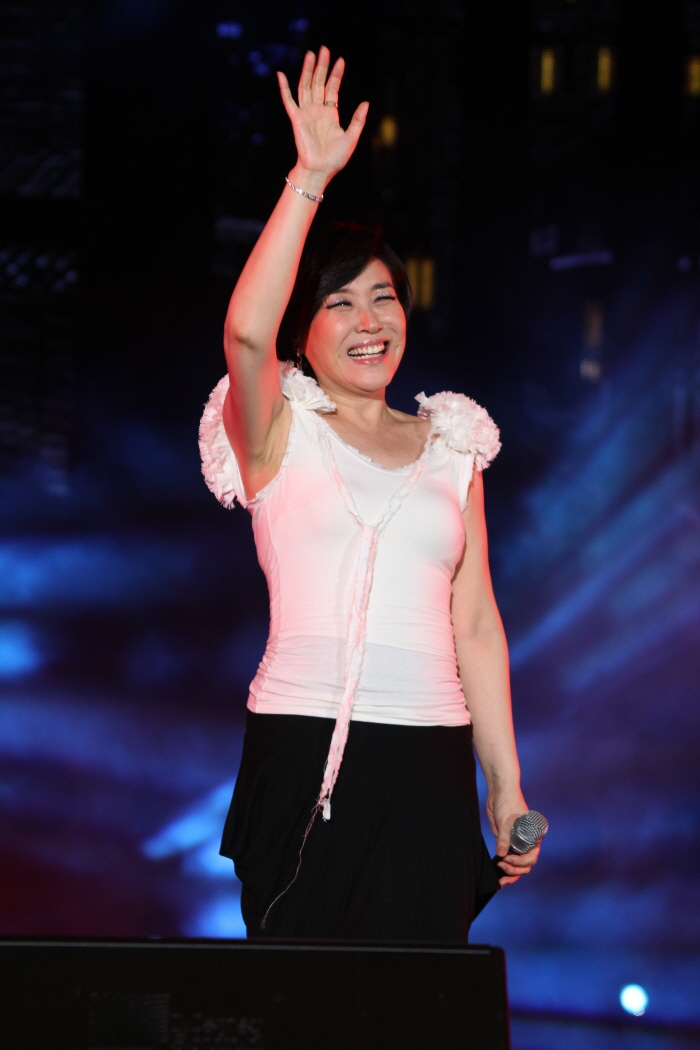

Background information
- Born: September 27, 1961 (age 65)
- Origin: Gwangju, South Korea
- Genre: Trot
- Occupation: Singer
- Years active: 1984–present
- Spouse: Lim Dong-shin (m. 1988)
- Website: Official website

Korean name
- Hangul: 주현미
- Hanja: 周炫美
- RR: Ju Hyeonmi
- MR: Chu Hyŏnmi

Joo Hyun-mi (Korean: 주현미; Hanja: 周炫美; born September 27, 1961) is a South Korean trot singer. Sometimes referred to as an "Empress of Trot", Joo is credited as being one of the leading figures in the trot music revival of the 1980s.

== Early life ==
Joo Hyun-mi was born on September 27, 1961 in Gwangju, South Korea to a South Korean mother and a father from Shandong, China. When she was a child, her parents moved to Taiwan to try to improve the family's financial situation, leaving Joo and her three younger siblings in the care of their grandmother. Following her grandmother's death, Joo raised her younger siblings alone, relying on money her mother sent from Taiwan. Joo was a citizen of Taiwan until adulthood when she became a South Korean citizen.

Joo attended Seoul Chinese Primary School and studied pharmacy at Chung-Ang University. While in university, she received an award for competing in the MBC Riverside Song Festival. After graduation, she worked as a pharmacist in Seoul.

== Career ==
Joo debuted as a singer in 1984 with the trot medley album Couple's Party, which sold 3 million copies, primarily through cassette tape sales at highway rest stops. The following year, in 1985, she released her first album of original songs, featuring the single "Rainy Yeongdong Bridge", which became one of her signature songs. That year, she won awards for Best New Artist at both the KBS Music Awards and MBC Gayo Daejejeon.

Over the next few years, Joo released several hit albums, including 1988's That Man in Shinsadong. The album and its lead single of the same name swept the year-end music awards shows, garnering Joo awards for Album of the Year at the Golden Disc Awards, the Grand Prize at the KBS Music Awards, and the two top awards for Most Popular Song and Most Popular Singer at the MBC Gayo Daejejeon.

== Personal life ==
In 1988, Joo married singer and guitarist Lim Dong-shin (임동신), who performed on Cho Yong-pil's album Cho Yong Pil and the Great Birth. They have two children.

== Discography ==
=== Studio albums ===
- Rainy Yeongdong Bridge (비내리는 영동교) (1985)
- My Love Don't Go (님아 가지말아요) (1985)
- I Have to Forget (잊어야지) (1985)
- Crying and Regretting (울면서 후회하네) (1985)
- Tangeumdae Story (탄금대 사연) (1986)
- Rainwater (빗물이야) (1986)
- First Affection (첫 정) (1986)
- Why Am I Crying? (내가 왜 웁니까) (1986)
- That Man in Shinsadong (신사동 그 사람) (1988)
- One-Sided Love (짝사랑) (1989)
- Wait (잠깐만) (1990)
- Love Story (사랑이야기) (1991)
- We Met Again (또 만났네요) (1992)
- First Love (첫사랑) (1993)
- Love Letter (러브레터) (2000)
- Really Good (정말 좋았네) (2003)
- Uhhura Love (어허라 사랑) (2006)
- 30th Anniversary Album (2014)

=== Medley albums ===
- Couple's Party (쌍쌍파티) (1984)

== Filmography ==
=== Television ===
Year	Title	Role	Ref.
2013	Hidden Singer 2	Contestant / Herself	
2019	Mother of Mine	Wang Wei (cameo)	
2020	Immortal Songs: Singing the Legend	Legend / Herself	
2020	K-Trot in Town	Herself	
2020	Trot National Sports Festival	Leader / Herself	
2020	Yesterday (인생앨범 예스터데이)	Host / Herself	
2022	Fire Trot (불타는 트롯맨)	Judge / Herself	
2023	King of Active Singers (현역가왕)	Judge / Herself	

== Awards ==
Award	Year	Category	Nominee / Work	Result	Ref.
Baeksang Arts Awards	1987	Best Original Song (TV)	"My Heart Is Like A Star"	Won	
Golden Disc Awards	1986	Album Bonsang	Crying and Regretting	Won	
Golden Disc Awards	1987	Album Bonsang	Why Am I Crying?	Won	
Golden Disc Awards	1988	Album of the Year (Daesang)	That Man in Shinsadong	Won	
Golden Disc Awards	1988	Album Bonsang	That Man in Shinsadong	Won	
Golden Disc Awards	1989	Album Bonsang	One-Sided Love	Won	
Golden Disc Awards	1990	Album Bonsang	Wait	Won	
KBS Music Awards	1985	Best New Female Artist	Joo Hyun-mi	Won	
KBS Music Awards	1987	Singer of the Year (Bonsang)	Joo Hyun-mi	Won	
KBS Music Awards	1987	Popularity Award	Joo Hyun-mi	Won	
KBS Music Awards	1988	Grand Prize (Daesang)	"That Man in Shinsadong"	Won	
KBS Music Awards	1988	Singer of the Year (Bonsang)	Joo Hyun-mi	Won	
KBS Music Awards	1989	Singer of the Year (Bonsang)	Joo Hyun-mi	Won	
KBS Music Awards	1990	Singer of the Year (Bonsang)	Joo Hyun-mi	Won	
KBS Music Awards	1991	Singer of the Year (Bonsang)	Joo Hyun-mi	Won	
KBS Music Awards	1992	Singer of the Year (Bonsang)	Joo Hyun-mi	Won	
KBS Music Awards	1995	Singer of the Year (Bonsang)	Joo Hyun-mi	Won	
KBS Music Awards	1996	Singer of the Year (Bonsang)	Joo Hyun-mi	Won	
KBS Music Awards	2000	Singer of the Year – Adult Category (Bonsang)	Joo Hyun-mi	Won	
KBS Music Awards	2001	Singer of the Year – Adult Category (Bonsang)	Joo Hyun-mi	Won	
MBC Gayo Daejejeon	1985	Best New Artist	Joo Hyun-mi	Won	
MBC Gayo Daejejeon	1986	Top Ten Singers Award	Joo Hyun-mi	Won	
MBC Gayo Daejejeon	1988	Most Popular Song	"That Man in Shinsadong"	Won	
MBC Gayo Daejejeon	1988	Most Popular Singer (Daesang)	Joo Hyun-mi	Won	
MBC Gayo Daejejeon	1988	Top Ten Singers Award	Joo Hyun-mi	Won	
MBC Gayo Daejejeon	1989	Most Popular Song	"One-Sided Love"	Won	
MBC Gayo Daejejeon	1989	Most Popular Singer (Daesang)	Joo Hyun-mi	Won	
MBC Gayo Daejejeon	1989	Top Ten Singers Award	Joo Hyun-mi	Won	
MBC Gayo Daejejeon	1990	Most Popular Song	"Wait"	Won	
MBC Gayo Daejejeon	1990	Top Ten Singers Award	Joo Hyun-mi	Won	
MBC Gayo Daejejeon	1991	Top Ten Singers Award	Joo Hyun-mi	Won	
MBC Gayo Daejejeon	1992	Top Ten Singers Award	Joo Hyun-mi	Won	
MBC Gayo Daejejeon	1999	Top Singer – Chosen by People Over 30	Joo Hyun-mi	Won	
MBC Riverside Song Festival	1981	Encouragement Award	Joo Hyun-mi	Won	
Mnet Asian Music Awards	2009	Trot Music Award	"Jjarajajja" (with Seohyun)	Nominated	

=== State honors ===
Name of country, year given, and name of honor
Country	Year	Honor	Ref.
South Korea (Note: Honors are given at the Korean Popular Culture and Arts Awards, arranged by the Korea Creative Content Agency and hosted by the Ministry of Culture, Sports and Tourism. They are awarded to those who have contributed to the arts and South Korea's pop culture.)	2010	Presidential Commendation	
