= Song Dae-kwan =

South Korean singer (1946–2025)

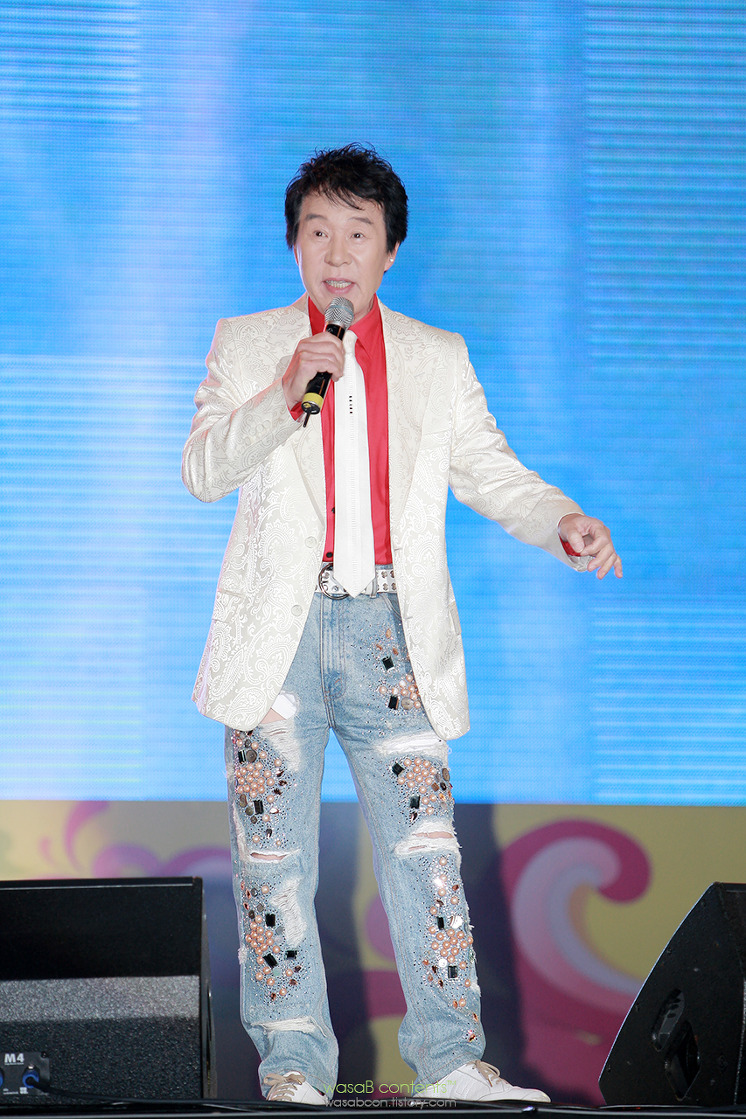
- Song in 2014

Background information
- Born: June 2, 1946; Chongup, Southern Korea (now Jeongeup, South Korea)
- Origin: Seoul, South Korea
- Died: February 7, 2025 (aged 78)
- Genre: Trot
- Occupation: Singer

Song Dae-kwan (Korean: 송대관, June 2, 1946 – February 7, 2025) was a South Korean trot singer. He often appeared on the KBS 1TV Golden Oldies.

== Early life and education ==
Song was born in 1946 in what was then Southern Korea's Cheolla Province, now South Korea's North Jeolla Province. His grandfather often ran afoul of the Japanese occupation authorities for his support of Korean independence. Song's father disappeared during the Korean War and was never found. As such, he was raised by his mother, graduating from high school in Jeonju. In 1965, he moved to Seoul and became acquainted with Son Jin-seok, the president of Oasis Records, becoming a singer.

== Career ==
Song released an album in 1971, though it was his 1975 album that helped propel him to stardom.

== Death ==
Song Dae-kwan died from a heart attack on February 7, 2025, at the age of 78. He had previously been discharged days prior to his death after being treated for candidiasis. He was cremated at the Seoul Memorial Park (서울추모공원) in Seoul and his ashes were buried at the Utopia Memorial Park (유토피아추모공원) in Anseong on February 9, 2025.

== Discography ==
=== Albums ===
- Song Dae Kwan (Works of Cho Dong San), September 2001
- Song Dae Kwan - Song & Life, September 2001
- Big Star Super Golden, May 2002

=== Collaborations ===
- Song Dae Kwan Highlight Album - Sorry to Love You, February 2005 (with Koyote)

== Ambassadorship ==
- Jeonbuk's Honorary Ambassador (2022)
