= Tae Jin-ah =

South Korean singer

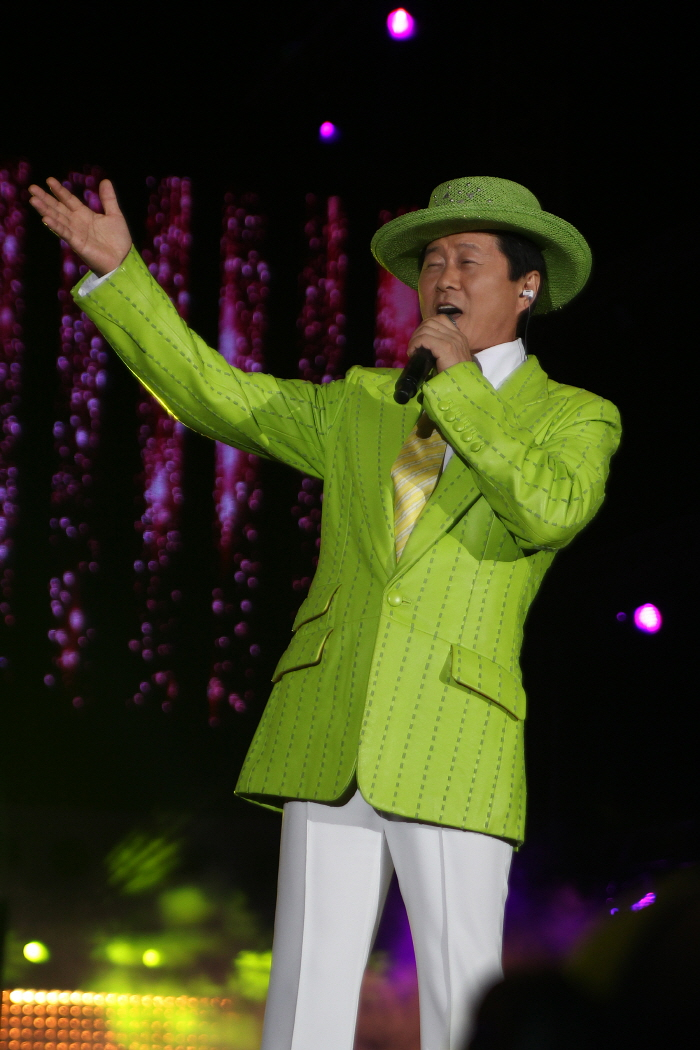
- Tae in 2012

Background information
- Born: Jo Bang-heon; February 16, 1953 (age 73); Boeun-gun, Chungcheongbuk-do, South Korea
- Origin: South Korea
- Genres: Trot, Dance-pop
- Occupation: Singer
- Years active: 1973–present
- Labels: Jin-ah Entertainment; Office Daiwa/Teichiku Records (Japan)

- Tae Jin-ah
- Hangul: 조방헌
- Hanja: 曺芳憲
- RR: Jo Bangheon
- MR: Cho Panghŏn

Stage name
- Hangul: 태진아
- Hanja: 太進兒
- RR: Tae Jina
- MR: T'ae China

Jo Bang-heon (Korean: 조방헌; born February 16, 1953), better known by his stage name, Tae Jin-ah (태진아), is a South Korean trot singer and entertainer. He debuted in 1973 with the song, "My Heart Express Train," and rose to fame soon after with the song, "Memory of a Blue Hill." Since 2002, he has hosted a radio program on KBS Radio 2 called the Tae Jin Ah Show Show Show. He often appears on the KBS 1TV 'Golden Oldies(Korean: 가요무대)'.

== Personal life ==
Tae has two sons; Eru (birth name Jo Sung-hyun), K-pop singer-songwriter and Jo Yoo-myeong, founder of YMC Entertainment and CEO of Swing Entertainment.

== Filmography ==
=== Film ===
Year	Title	Role	Ref.
2000	Taga King (타가킹)	cameo	
2006	Hotel M: Gangster's Last Draw (마강호텔)	cameo	

== Awards ==
=== Golden Disc Awards ===
Year	Category	Nominated work	Result	Ref.
1989	Main Prize	"Ok Kyung-yi" (옥경이)	Won	
1990	Main Prize	"Woman Who Doesn't Even Look at a Mirror" (거울도 안 보는 여자)	Won	
1995	Main Prize	"Love Is Gone" (가버린 사랑)	Won	
1998	Main Prize	"Lover" (애인)	Won	
1999	Achievement Award	—N/a	Won	
2000	Main Prize	"Not Everyone Can Fall in Love" (사랑은 아무나 하나)	Won	
2001	Trot Award	"Good For You" (잘났어 정말)	Won	
2002	Trot Award	"Love Is Not A Joke" (사랑은 장난이 아니야)	Won	
2003	Trot Award	"Fool" (바보)	Won	
2004	Trot Award	"Companion" (동반자)	Won	

=== Seoul Music Awards ===
Year	Category	Nominated work	Result	Ref.
1991	Grand Prize	Woman Who Doesn't Even Look at a Mirror (거울도 안보는 여자)	Won	
1991	Main Prize	—N/a	Won	
2000	Main Prize	—N/a	Won	
2001	Main Prize	—N/a	Won	
2016	Trot Award	—N/a	Won	

=== Mnet Asian Music Awards ===
Year	Category	Nominated work	Result	Ref.
2000	Judges' Choice Award	"Not Everyone Can Fall in Love" (사랑은 아무나 하나)	Won	
2010	Adult Music Award	—N/a	Won	

== Ambassadorship ==
- Daesong (DS) SLK Group Ambassador (2021)
