= Drama (Jang Minho album) =

Studio album by Jang Minho
- Released: January 2, 2017
- Recorded: 2016
- Genre: trot (music), K-pop
- Length: 53:43
- Label: Elijah Entertainment

Jang Minho chronology
The Man Says (2013)	Drama (2017)	Essay ep. 1 (2022)

Singles from Drama
- 1. "The Man Says"; 2. "Love You, Nuna"

Drama (드라마) is an album by South Korean singer Jang Minho. It was released on January 2, 2017, by Korean record label Elijah Entertainment. The album is trot oriented, allowing many different tempos and styles.

== Background ==
It is Jang's first full-length album as a trot singer since his trot debut in 2011. It features the song "Drama". The album includes his hit song "The Man Says" which was released previously and included in the same title single album.

== Rediscovered ==
Jang has performed the song "You Know My Name" at the popular TV show Romantic Call Centre where he stars every week as a regular cast since 2020. The song entered the chart three years after the album was released. One of this song's YouTube videos is gaining 1.5 million views. The 42nd episode of Romantic Call Centre, which he performed the song "You Know My Name" for the second time, soared to 13.9% nationwide and 15.7% per minute based on Nielsen Korea. "Yeol-li-ji was sung by fellow trot singer Lee Chan-won at the same TV show in 2021, and the song's YouTube video recorded 2 million views in 25 days. "Man vs. Man" has also received new attention in four years since its release, with YouTube's integrated view count exceeding 1 million. The 44th episode of Romantic Call Centre, where "Man vs. Man" was performed, rose to 12.1% nationwide and 13.0% per minute based on Nielsen Korea.

== Track listing ==
Full album track list
No.	Title	Lyrics	Music	Length
1.	"연리지 (連理枝)" (Yeol-li-ji)	Lee Yong-gu	Kim Geundong	3:40
2.	"드라마" (Drama)	Ma Gyeongsik	Oh Seung-eun	3:10
3.	"남자는 말합니다" (The Man Says)	Yoon Myungsun	Yang Joo	3:17
4.	"내 이름 아시죠" (You Know My Name)	Jang Minho	Jang Minho; Yoo Jongwoon	3:34
5.	"바람같은 인생" (Life Like a Wind)	Park Minho	Park Minho	3:34
6.	"남자 대 남자" (Man vs. Man)	Jeong Dongjin	Jeong Dongjin	3:18
7.	"내 동생" (My Brother)	Sul Woon Do	Sul Woon Do	3:14
8.	"사랑해 누나" (Love, Nuna)	Han Jungmin; Kim Gil-rae	Han Jungmin	3:02
9.	"수은등" (Mercury Lamp)	Yoo Sootae	Kim Honam	2:55
10.	"The Man Says (JPN Ver.)"	Yoon Myungsun	Yang Joo	3:30
11.	"The Man Says (CHN Ver.)"	Yoon Myungsun	Yang Joo	3:30
12.	"Yeol-li-ji(instrumental)"	Lee Yong-gu	Kim Geundong	3:40
13.	"Drama(instrumental)"	Ma Gyeongsik	Oh Seung-eun	3:10
14.	"The Man Says(instrumental)"	Yoon Myungsun	Yang Joo	3:17
15.	"Man vs. Man(instrumental)"	Jeong Dongjin	Jeong Dongjin	3:18
16.	"You Know My Name(instrumental)"	Jang Minho	Jang Minho; Yoo Jongwoon	3:17
Total length:				53:43

== Credits and personnel ==
Personnel as listed in the album's liner notes are:

Full Album

- Performed by Jang Minho
- Composed by Jang Minho, Ma Gyeongsik, Jeong Dongjin, Sul Woon Do, Kim Geundong, Yoo Jongwoon, Yang Joo, Park Minho, Kim Honam, Han Jeongmin
- Written by Jang Minho, Ma Gyeongsik, Yoon Myungsun, Jeong Dongjin, Sul Woon Do, Lee Yong-gu, Park Minho, Kim Gil-rae, Yoo Sootae, Han Jungmin
- Arranged by Oh Seung-eun, Yang Joo, Kim Geundong, Park Gwangbok, Yoo Jongwoon, Park Minho, Lee Seungsoo, Jeong Jaewon
- Drum: Kang Sooho, Kwak Eunhae
- Bass: Lee Seungsoo, Park Minho, Shin Hyungwon
- Guitar: Kwon Tae-kwon, Park Gwangmin, Choi Soon, Ham Choonho, Lee Seong-ryul, Park Gwangbok
- Piano & Keyboard: Son Joohee, Kim Heasun, Yang Kyungjoo, Park Gwangbok, Jeon Youngho, Kim Geundong
- Trumpet: Yoo Kwanjoong, Kim Dongha
- Trumbone: Lee Hanjin
- String Arrange: Yang Kyungjoo
- String Jam: Bae Shinhee
- Chorus: Kim Hyuna, Park Chaewon, Do Yoonsook
- Sohaegeum: Park Sungjin
- Daegeum: Han Choong-eun

Production and design

- Executive Produced by Shin Hoonchul, Kim Taehoon
- Produced by Shin Hoonchul, Jang Minho
- Supervised by Don Kim
- Management: Cho Yoonchul, Lee Chanhyung
- Marketing Promotion: Elijah Entertainment
- Mastered by Do Jeonghee
- Hair & Makeup by Kang Ho
- Photo & Design by Hooni Yongi
- Printed by Daeyoung Printing Ltd.
