= The Man Says =

Song by Jang Minho

Song by Jang Minho

from the album The Man Says
- Language: Korean
- Released: May 16, 2013
- Genre: Trot (music)
- Length: 3:17 (EP version); 2:58 (single version); 3:30 (Japanese / Chinese version)
- Label: Elijah Entertainment
- Composer: Yang Joo
- Lyricist: Yoon Myungsun

"The Man Says" (Korean: 남자는 말합니다) is a slow tempo Trot song performed by Jang Minho on his EP, The Man Says. It was first released as EP in 2013 and later included in his first album Drama in 2017. This song became Jang's first big hit.

According to KY Entertainment, The man says ranked fourth on the TOP10 chart, which was the most sung song in the year 2021 at Keumyoung Karaoke(for SK NUGU service).

== History ==
Jang Minho's first trot single Love you, Nuna, released in 2011, did not succeed in sales. However, the label decided to release the EP album, The Man Says in 2013. His fan club has existed since he became a trot singer but he was almost unknown to public. It was 2 years after this album released, he became very popular with trot fans. This song gave him the nickname 'omtongnyong' (a compound word of mom and president) and the honor of various awards at the same time.

"The Man says" was included in Jang's first full album Jang Minho The Drama released in 2017. The album includes four different versions which are the original, Chinese, Japanese and instrumental version. The new version of "The Man says" was released as a single album in 2019.

== Music video ==
No music video was recorded for the initial release in 2013, however a video clip was filmed by MBC music in 2015 and aired December 15, 2015.

== Track listing ==
"The Man Says" is included in Jang Minho's three albums in three different language versions, a fast tempo version and an instrumental version(karaoke version).

- EP Released in 2013
1. "My Brother" 내 동생 – 3:14
2. "Life Like a Wind" 바람같은 인생 – 3:34
3. "The Man Says" 남자는 말합니다 – 3:17
4. "Love you, Nuna" 사랑해 누나 – 3:02
5. "Mercury Lamp" 수은등 – 2:55
6. "The Man Says" (Jpn Ver.) 남자는 말합니다 (Jpn Ver.) – 3:30
7. "The Man Says" (Chn Ver.) 남자는 말합니다 (Chn Ver.) – 3:30
8. "My Brother" 내 동생 (Inst.) – 3:14
9. "The Man Says"(Inst.) 남자는 말합니다 (Inst.) – 3:17
- Album Released in 2017
1. "Yeol-li-ji" 연리지 (連理枝) – 3:40
2. "Drama" 드라마 3:10
3. "The Man Says" 남자는 말합니다 – 3:17
4. "He Knows My Name" 내 이름 아시죠 – 3:34
5. "Life Like a Wind" 바람같은 인생 – 3:34
6. "Man vs. Man" 남자 대 남자 – 3:18
7. "My Brother" 내 동생 – 3:14
8. "Love you, Nuna" 사랑해 누나 – 3:02
9. Mercury Lamp 수은등 – 2:55
10. The Man Says Jpn Ver. 남자는 말합니다 (Jpn Ver.) – 3:30
11. The Man Says Chn Ver. 남자는 말합니다 (Chn Ver.) – 3:30
12. Yeol-li-ji 연리지 (instrumental) – 3:40
13. Dram 드라마 (instrumental) – 3:10
14. The Man Says 남자는 말합니다 (instrumental) – 3:17
15. Man vs. Man 남자대 남자 (instrumental) – 3:18
16. He Knows My Name 내 이름 아시죠 (instrumental) – 3:34
- Single Album Released in 2019
1. "The Man Says" 남자는 말합니다 (New Ver.) – 2:58
2. "The Man Says" 남자는 말합니다 (New Ver.) (Inst.) – 2:58

== Live performance ==
The Man says is a regular in all events where Jang Minho performs. He once revealed in an interview that he attended more than 70 television(including radio) and local events a month during the peak season. In 2018, it performed in front of children in Philippines as part of the Compassion event. Since Jang released a new version of "The Man says" that is a fast tempo in 2019, the fast version became one of the setlists at events. Jang's performance at Yeosu MBC event gained 2.5 million views on YouTube. Jang performed the song at the Trot Awards 2020 that broadcast live on TV Chosun and ranked first among other channels with an audience rating of 22.4%.

== Cover versions ==
The song has been recorded by more than 200 singers including Keum Jandi(금잔디), Jin Sung(진성), Lim Young-woong(임영웅), Young Tak(영탁). Lim Young-woong's cover video on his YouTube channel is updating 2 million views. Lim also performed at a variety show, Radio Star which gained over 1 million views and a talk show, Oh My Singer gained 612,734 views. Young Tak's cover at a TV Chosun's variety show, Romantic Call center gained 1.4 million views. Kim Heejae, one of Mr. Trot's top 6 also covered at Nakdonggang Song Festival and the video was viewed over 1 million times. Trot singer Cho Hangjo covered at Yeosu MBC event and the video gained 2.9 million views. Kim Taeyeon(from Miss Trot season 2) covered at a TV show and the video gained 574,566 views less than a month.(retrieved May 29, 2021) Teenage amateur singer Lee Si-eun covered it and her video gained 1.3 million views.

== Credits and personnel ==
- Performed by Jang Minho
- Composed and arranged by Yang Joo
- Written by Yoon Myungsun
- Guitar: Ham Choonho
- Bass: Shin Hyunkwon
- Keyboard and string arrange: Yang Kyungjoo
- String: Bae Shinhee
- Chorus: Kim Hyuna
- Sohaegeum: Park Sungjin
- Recording engineers: Song Kyungjo, Park Eunkyung
- Mixing engineer: Choi Namjin
