= U-BeS =

1997–1998 South Korean boy band

- Origin: South Korea
- Genres: K-pop; dance
- Years active: 1997–1998
- Past members: Jang Hogeun; Kim Mukyung; Lee Choongin; Kim Joonwoo

U-BeS (Korean: 유비스; RR: Yubiseu; an acronym for You will be with us) was a South Korean boy band formed in 1997. The group consisted of four members: Jang Ho-geun, Kim Mu-kyung, Lee Choong-in, Kim Joon-woo. U-BeS is part of the first generation of modern Korean idol groups; groups that debuted the same year include S.E.S, Sechs Kies, N.R.G, Taesaja, and more.

The group released two full-length albums: U-BeS (1997) and You Will Be with Us (1998). Despite the group being inactive since 1999, U-BeS' disbandment has never been officially announced. Leader Hogeun eventually resumed his music career, and now performs as a trot singer under the moniker Jang Minho.

== History ==
=== 1997–1998: Debut and disbandment ===
When the group debuted in 1997, the leader Hogeun and Kim Mukyung were university students, and the other two members were in high school. With releasing their first album, the group started to appear in many TV shows with the title track, Legend of the Stars. This song was written in memory of the younger brother of Lee Choongin, one of the members, who died young. Their choreography received huge attention that mixed the movements of kendo and Chinese martial arts. The group was also active in collaborating with other musicians, such as the Australian band Human Nature with producing a duet song.

They released their second studio album You Will Be with Us in 1998. However, the group split up due to poor album sales and disagreements with the agency.

=== 2020: Back in the spotlight ===
U-BeS is back in the spotlight almost 20 years after the disbandment when former leader Jang Minho appeared in Mr. Trot in 2020. Jang Minho's career as an idol-turned-trot singer has drawn attention. Along with Jang's rising popularity, former U-BeS fans have begun to visit the fan café again. SBS hurriedly created Jang Minho's channel in their video archives to fill up the latest videos as well as the old U-BeS videos. Many '90s idols such as Bada (S.E.S), Tony Ahn (H.O.T), Koyote, g.o.d, NRG appeared on TV Chosun's Romantic Call Centre and Ppongsoonah School recalled and talked about U-BeS and Jang Minho at that time.

== Discography ==
=== Studio albums ===
Title	Album details	Peak chart positions	Sales
Title	Album details	KOR	Sales
U-BeS	Released: 4 September 1997; Label: Music Factory; Format: CD, cassette; Track list: 1. 야누스 시대 Janus Times; 2. 우리들만의 세상 World of our own 3. 탈출 Escape; 4. C.C. (캠퍼스 커플) Campus Couple; 5. 별의 전설 Legend of Stars; 6. 고백 Confession; 7. Oh, No; 8. 에덴의 동쪽 East of Eden; 9. 별의 전설 (Remix) Legend of Stars (Remix); 10. 야누스 시대 (inst.) Janus Times (inst.)	No data	No data
You Will Be with Us	Released: 16 June 1998; Label: Sony Music; Format: CD, cassette; Track list: 1. 특급작전 Special Operations; 2. 도전왕 Challenge King; 3. 비오던 날... Rainy day…; 4. 백일천하 Hundred Days(Cent-Jours); 5. 순수론 Theory of Purity; 6. 거꾸로 하는 이별 Breaking up Backwards; 7. 요술램프 Magic Lamp; 8. 너에게 To You; 9. Alone; 10. 도전왕 (Remix ver.) Challenge King (Remix ver.)	No data	No data

== See also ==
- Jang Minho
