= You Know My Name (disambiguation) =

"You Know My Name" is a 2006 song by Chris Cornell and the theme to the James Bond film Casino Royale.

You Know My Name may also refer to:

- You Know My Name (film), a 1999 television film
- "You Know My Name" (Courtney Love song), 2014
- "You Know My Name (Look Up the Number)", a 1970 song by The Beatles
- "You Know My Name" (Jang Minho song), 2017
- You Know My Name, an album by Frankie Bones
