= Hooni Yongi =

Korean Trot duo

- Genres: Trot (music); K-pop
- Instrument: Vocals
- Years active: 2011–present
- Labels: 빛이나는엔터테인먼트
- Members: Hooni; Yongi

Hooni Yongi (Korean: 후니용이) are a Korean Trot duo formed in 2011 by Hooni and Yongi.

== Career ==
Hooni (Choi Myunghoon) debuted as a solo singer in 2002 and became a member of the idol group 'Giyeok' in 2004. The group disbanded after 4 years and he quit being a singer. While working as a record producer, In 2010, Hooni happened to meet Yongi (Kim Minjae) who was a travel agent due to business relationships. Hooni suggested to Yongi to form a Trot duo. They debuted in 2011 with the song '1m 1s(1분 1초)'.

Hooni is also a designer and photographer. He has designed countless album covers for various artists such as Kim Ho-joong, Jang Minho, Miljenko Matijevic. They also directed the music video for Yoo Jae-suk's song "Redevelopment of Love (사랑의 재개발)". The music video hits over 4.7 million views on YouTube. Hooni Yongi took one hour to film entire music video that shocked Yoo Jae-suk but result was satisfied the singer. Later Hooni Yongi covered the song with their style and also carol version.

Since May 2020, Yongi has been the host of Jeonju MBC's 'Oh My Singer' following Jang Minho.

Since signing a seasonal contract with KDH Entertainment in January 2021, they have been actively promoting, such as appearing in 'Gayo Stage' and 'Trot People'. Hooni Yongi has been actively collaborate with other artists, and are currently in forming the project group 'Segasoo' with a trot singer Myungji. 'Segasoo' released a digital single 'Holodaen Sarang(홀로된 사랑)'.

== Discography ==
Studio album

- Non-stop 7080 (15 January 2016)
- Ballad (Remake album) (9 May 2018)

Extended play

- Remind (Jung 4, 2015)
