= You Know My Name (Jang Minho song) =

Song by Jang Minho

from the album Drama
- Released: January 2, 2017
- Recorded: 2017
- Genre: Trot (music); Ballad
- Length: 3:34
- Label: Elijah Entertainment, Wings Entertainment
- Songwriter(s): Jang Minho; Yoo Jongwoon

"You Know My Name" is a song by South Korean Trot musician Jang Minho. It was released on Jang's first trot regular album Drama in 2017.

== Song information ==
You know my name in Korean (내 이름 아시죠) is the same translation of a gospel song 'He knows my name'. Jang seems to have been influenced because he is a Christian. The lyrics is a first person perspective talking to 'you', so it was translated to You know my name in English instead of He knows my name.

This song was written by Jang Minho, missing his deceased father, and composed with Yoo Jongwoon. It is the fourth track of Jang's first trot regular album, Drama. At the time of release, nothing other than the title song was known. During the recording of Romantic Call center he revealed that it was the first time singing in front of the audience because the song makes him too emotional to perform. The audience who requested this song also became a topic because she was 100 years old and a huge fan of Jang Minho's. After the live performance at the Romantic Call center in September 2020, when performing this song in front of fans again at an online concert in February 2021, Jang could not control his emotions and had to stop the performance once. In the reality show God father, which has been airing since October 2021, 'Everyone has someone who gave you a name and we want the loved ones are not lonely when they leave this world', Jang explained the meaning of lyrics and sang the song to God father Kim Kap-soo. Kim expressed his feelings that he was heartbroken while listening to the song. The song was also sung at Jang's concert, and Kim Kap-soo's tearful expression at the concert was caught on camera.

== Live performance ==
This song entered the charts three years after its release. It became a hot topic when it was introduced to the popular show Romantic Call Center, which recorded the highest ratings every week. The video of this song's live performance hits 5.9 million views on YouTube. It is renewing 2.7 million views on Jang's personal channel and 3.2 million views on show's official channel.

== Credits and personnel ==
Personnel as listed in the album's liner notes are.

Musicians

- Composed by Jang Minho, Yoo Jongwoon
- Written by Jang Minho
- Arranged by Yoo Jongwoon
- Guitar : Ham Choonho
- Bass : Shin Hyungwon
- Drum : Kang Sooho
- Keyboard : Jeon Youngho
- Chorus : Kim Hyuna
- Sohaegeum: Park Sungjin
- Produced by Shin Hoonchul, Jang Minho

Technical

- Recording and mixing : Park Mu-il, Choi Namjin

== Release history ==
Region	Date	Format	Label
South Korea	January 2, 2017	CD, Digital download	Elijah Entertainment, Wings Entertainment
