= Forbes Korea Power Celebrity 40 =

Logo of Forbes

Forbes Korea Power Celebrity 40 is an annual list published by Forbes Korea magazine since 2009. The catalog presents a compilation of the forty most powerful celebrities in the South Korean sports and entertainment spheres. These figures are classified based on their noteworthy accomplishments in their respective fields, media exposure, social media popularity, scope of appearances, and their earnings throughout the previous year. Forbes Korea Power Celebrity 40 is the Korean version of the Highest-paid Celebrity 100 selected annually by Forbes in the United States.

== Selection process ==
The ranking is determined by calculating a "Celebrity Index" based on four main categories: annual earnings (from broadcasting, advertisements, music sales, and concerts), media exposure, social media presence, and professional awards. Starting in 2026, the process integrated a global fan voting component via the platform Mnet Plus, allowing domestic and international fans to influence the final rankings.

== Top 10 by year ==
=== 2009 ===
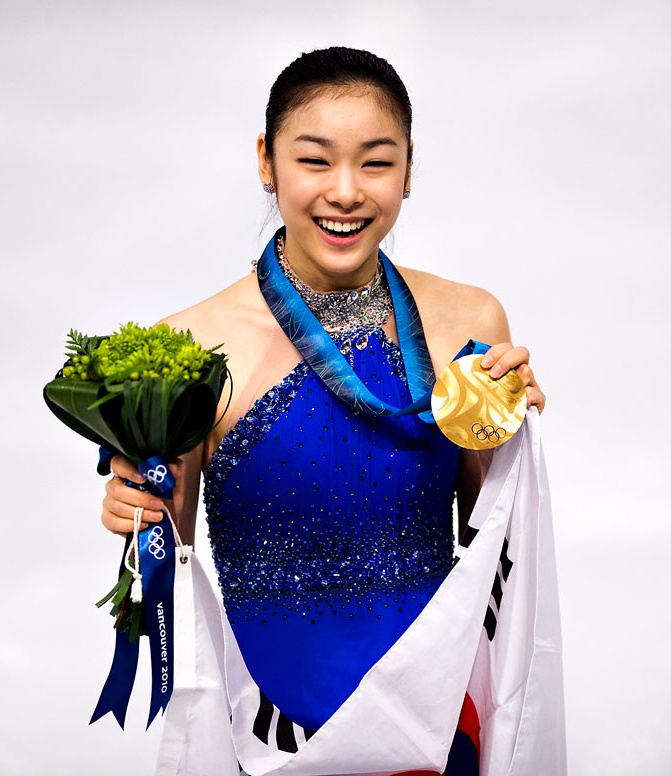
Figure skater Yuna Kim

Rank	Name	Profession
1	Yuna Kim	Figure skater
2	Big Bang	Boy group
3	Wonder Girls	Girl group
4	Lee Hyori	Singer
5	Girls' Generation	Girl group
6	Park Ji-sung	Football player
7	Lee Seung-yuop	Baseball player
8	Rain	Singer
9	Yoo Jae-suk	Comedian, TV host
10	Kim Tae-hee	Actress

=== 2010 ===
Rank	Name	Profession
1	Yuna Kim	Figure skater
2	Girls' Generation	Girl group
3	Park Ji-sung	Football player
4	Lee Byung-hun	Actor
5	Big Bang	Boy group
6	Go Hyun-jung	Actress
7	Lee Seung-gi	Singer, actor, TV host
8	Lee Hyo-ri	Singer
9	Yoo Jae-suk	Comedian, TV host
10	Kang Ho-dong	Comedian, TV host

=== 2011 ===
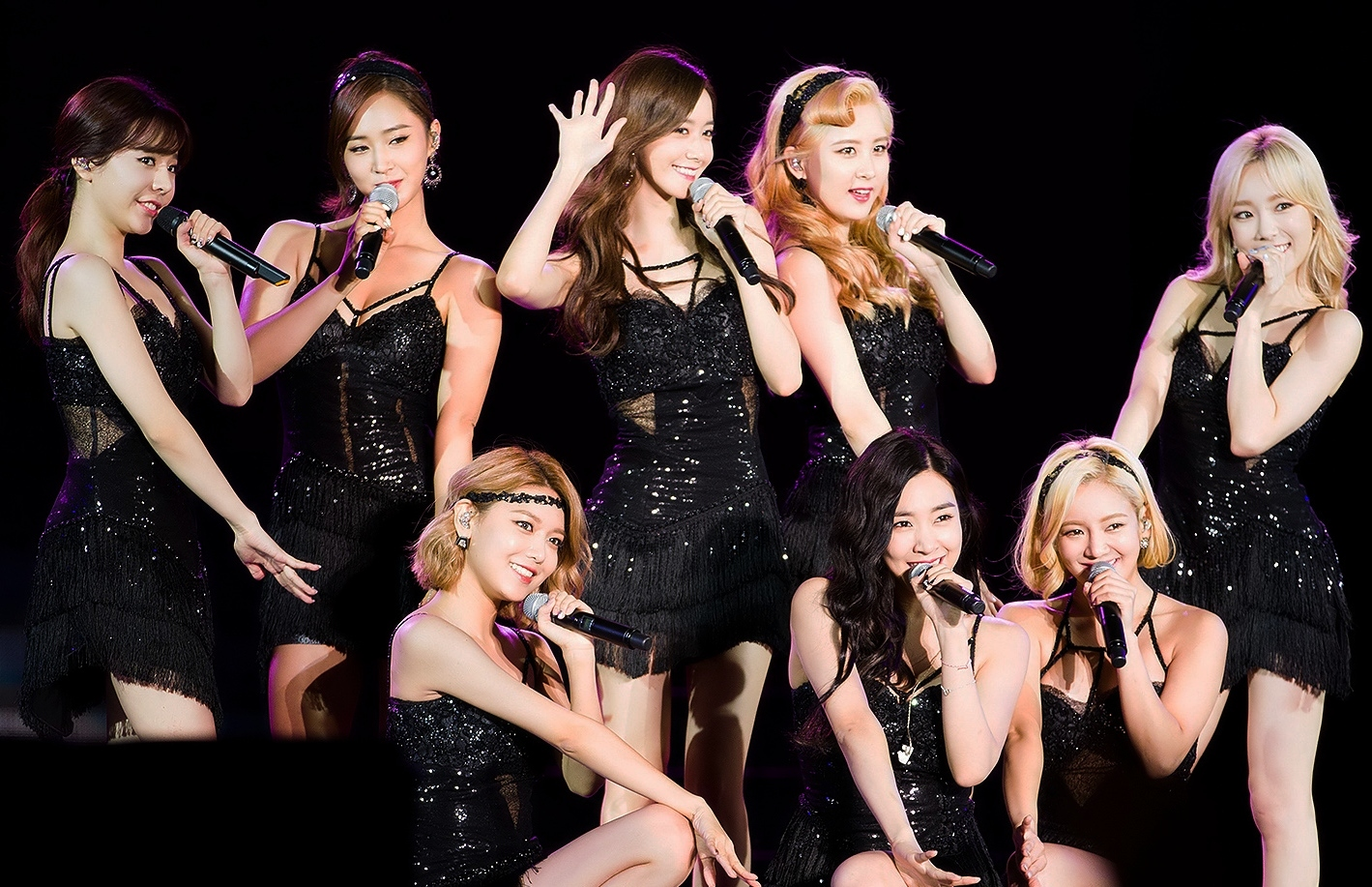
Girl group Girls' Generation

Rank	Name	Profession
1	Girls' Generation	Girl group
2	Park Ji-sung	Soccer player
3	Yuna Kim	Figure skater
4	Lee Seung-gi	Singer, actor, TV host
5	2PM	Boy group
6	Yoo Jae-suk	Comedian, TV host
7	Lee Chung-yong	Football player
8	2AM	Boy group
9	Shin-soo Choo	Baseball player
10	Kang Ho-dong	Comedian, TV host

=== 2012 ===
Rank	Name	Profession
1	Girls' Generation	Girl group
2	Big Bang	Boy group
3	IU	Singer, actress
4	Kara	Girl group
5	Yuna Kim	Figure skater
6	Lee Seung-gi	Singer, actor, TV host
7	Park Ji-sung	Football player
8	Kim Tae-hee	Actress
9	Beast	Boy group
10	Park Tae-hwan	Swimmer

=== 2013 ===
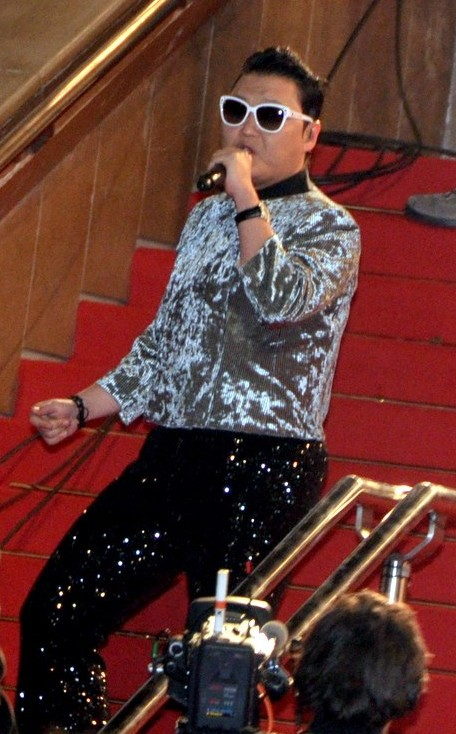
Singer Psy

Rank	Name	Profession
1	Psy	Singer
2	Girls' Generation	Girl group
3	Son Yeon-jae	Rhythmic gymnast
4	Kim Soo-hyun	Actor
5	Big Bang	Boy group
6	Park Tae-hwan	Swimmer
7	Song Joong-ki	Actor
8	IU	Singer, actress
9	Yuna Kim	Figure skater
10	Super Junior	Boy group

=== 2014 ===
Rank	Name	Profession
1	Girls' Generation	Girl group
2	Big Bang	Boy group
3	Suzy	Singer, actress
4	Ryu Hyun-jin	Baseball player
5	Exo	Boy group
6	Choo Shin-soo	Baseball player
7	TVXQ	Boy band
8	Shinee	Boy band
9	Yuna Kim	Figure skater
10	IU	Singer, actress

=== 2015 ===
Rank	Name	Profession
1	Exo	Boy group
2	Kim Soo-hyun	Actor
3	Yuna Kim	Figure skater
4	Jun Ji-hyun	Actress
5	Son Yeon-jae	Rhythmic gymnast
6	Lee Seung-gi	Singer, actor, TV host
7	Ryu Hyun-Jin	Baseball player
8	Son Heung-Min	Football player
9	Girls' Generation	Girl group
10	Sistar	Girl group

=== 2016 ===
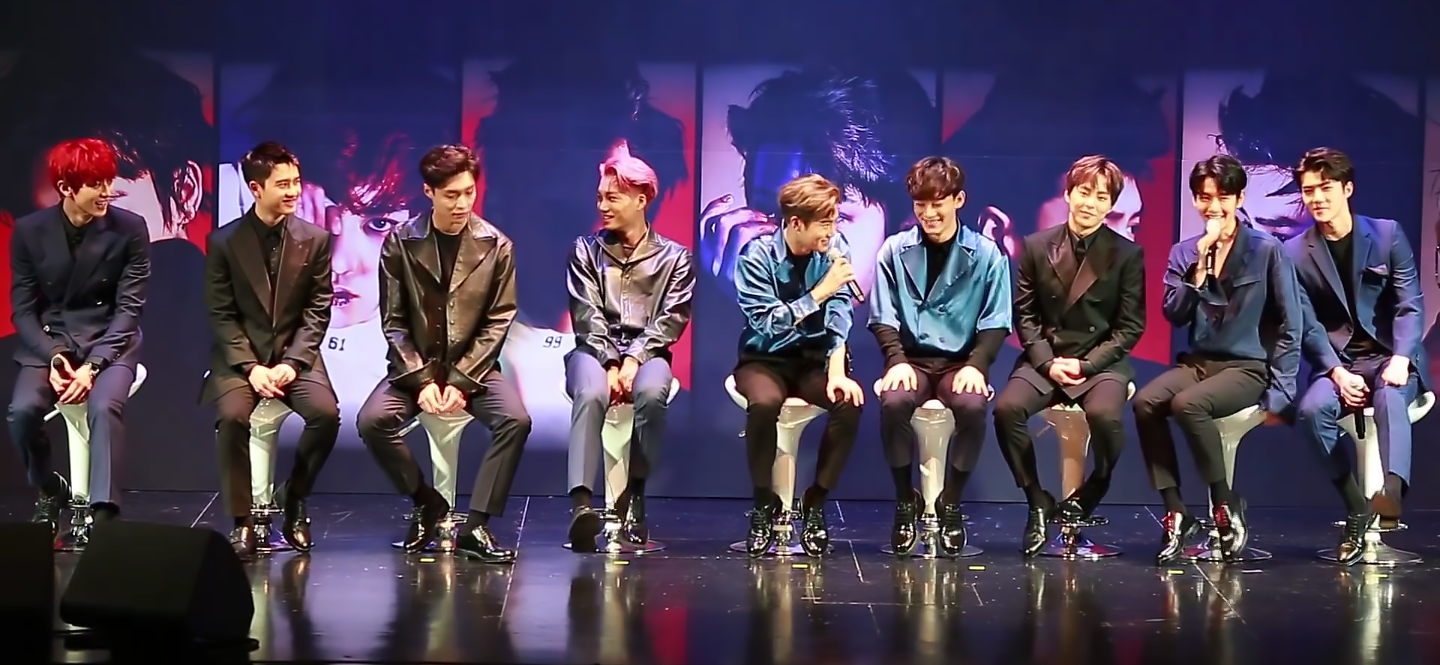
Boy group Exo

Rank	Name	Profession
1	Exo	Boy group
2	Yoo Ah-in	Actor
3	Hyeri	Singer, actress
4	Girls' Generation	Girl group
5	Kim Soo-hyun	Actor
6	Big Bang	Boy group
7	Inbee Park	Golfer
8	Jun Ji-hyun	Actress
9	IU	Singer, actress
10	Jung-ho Kang	Baseball player

=== 2017 ===
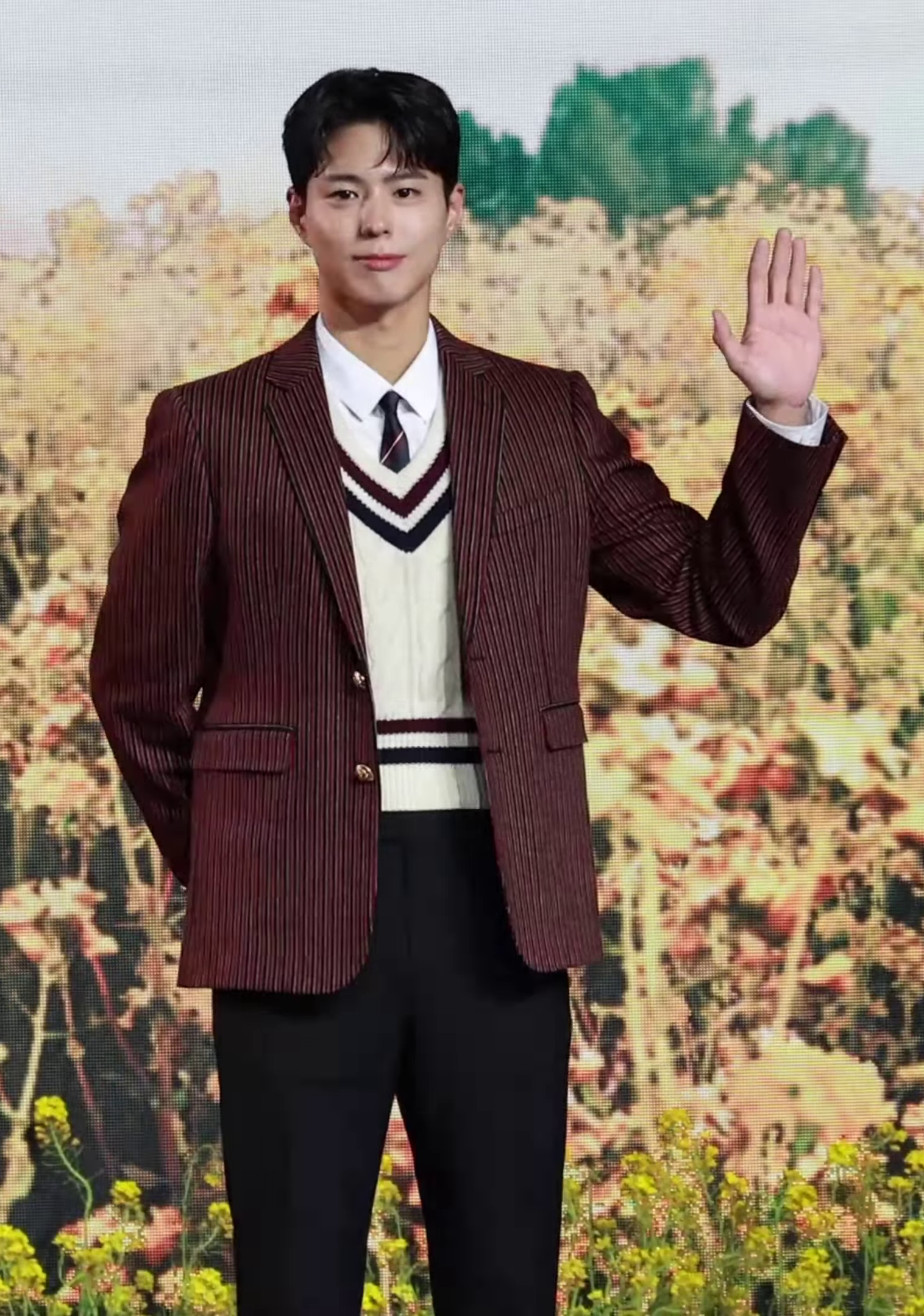
Actor Park Bo-gum

Rank	Name	Profession
1	Park Bo-gum	Actor
2	Song Joong-ki	Actor
3	Twice	Girl group
4	Exo	Boy group
5	BTS	Boy group
6	Suzy	Singer, actress
7	Song Hye-kyo	Actress
8	Kim You-jung	Actress
9	Jo Jung-suk	Actor
10	Oh Seung-hwan	Baseball player

=== 2018 ===
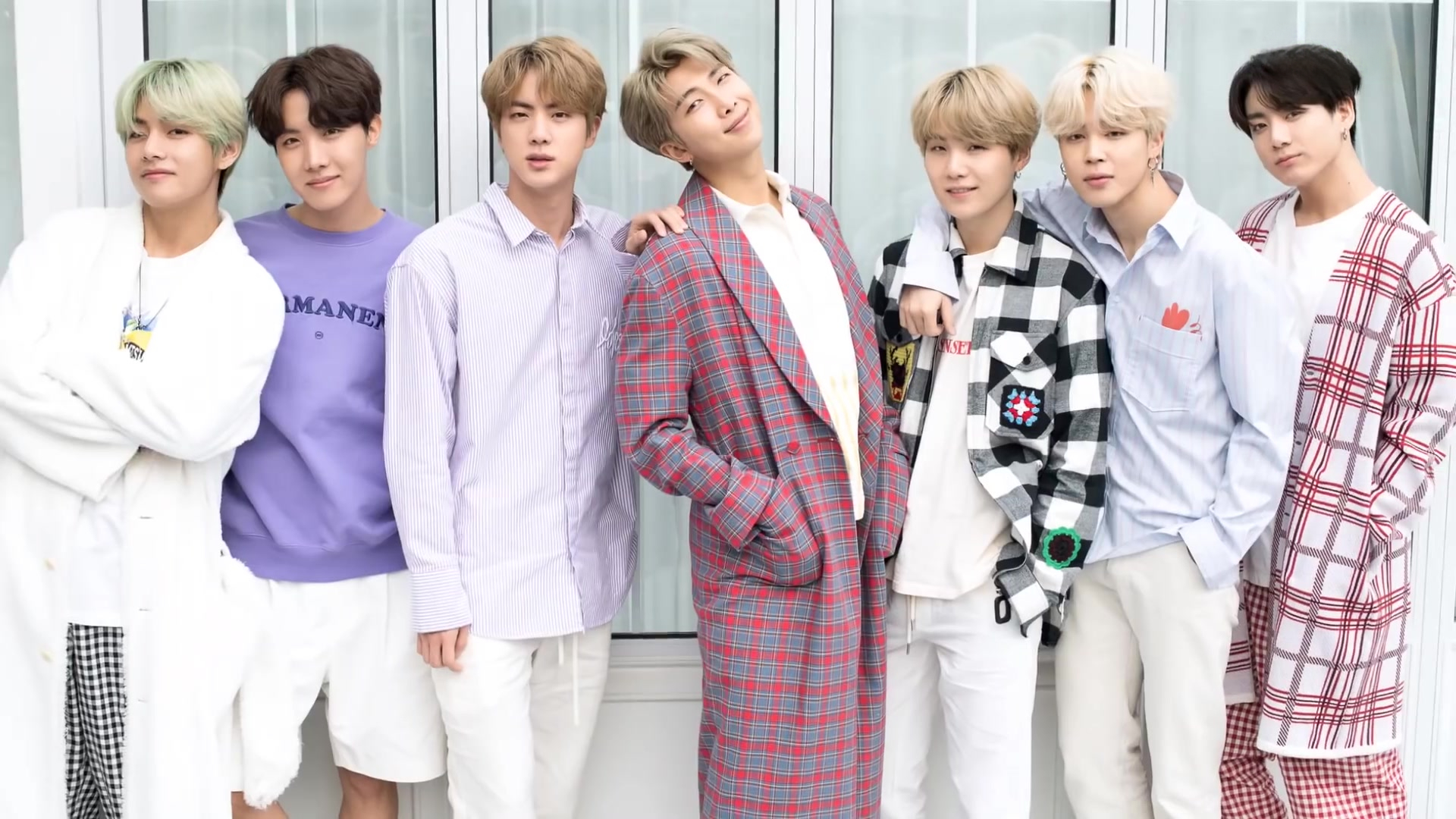
Boy group BTS

Rank	Name	Profession
1	BTS	Boy group
2	Wanna One	Boy group
3	Twice	Girl group
4	Exo	Boy band
5	IU	Singer, actress
6	Song Hye-kyo	Actress
7	Song Joong-ki	Actor
8	Park Bo-gum	Actor
9	Yuna Kim	Figure skater
10	Hyun-jin Ryu	Baseball player

=== 2019 ===
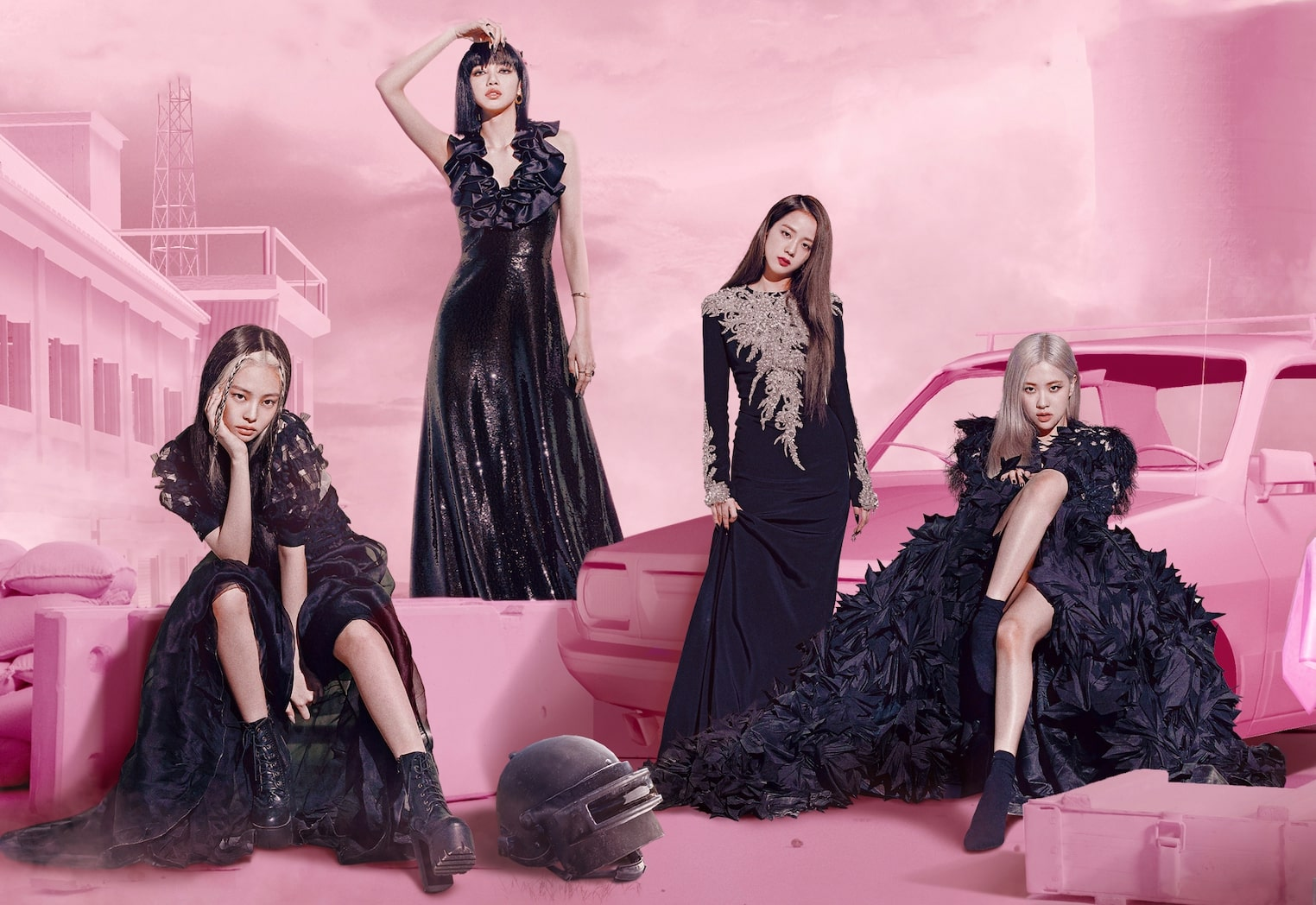
Girl group Blackpink

Rank	Name	Profession
1	Blackpink	Girl group
2	BTS	Boy group
3	Wanna One	Boy group
4	Kang Daniel	Singer
5	Red Velvet	Girl group
6	Park Na-rae	Comedian
7	Hong Jin-young	Singer
8	Han Ji-min	Actress
9	Son Heung-min	Football player
10	Exo	Boy group

=== 2020 ===
Rank	Name	Profession
1	BTS	Boy group
2	Hyun-jin Ryu	Baseball player
3	Blackpink	Girl group
4	Son Heung-min	Football player
5	Bong Joon-ho	Filmmaker
6	Jun Hyun-moo	TV host
7	Park Na-rae	Comedian
8	Lee Soo-geun	Comedian
9	Twice	Girl group
10	Kim Hee-chul	Singer, TV host

=== 2021 ===
Rank	Name	Profession
1	BTS	Boy group
2	Blackpink	Girl group
3	Hyun-jin Ryu	Baseball player
4	Son Heung-min	Football player
5	Lim Young-woong	Singer
6	Kwang-hyun Kim	Baseball player
7	Yoo Jae-suk	Comedian, TV host
8	Young Tak	Singer
9	Jeong Dong-won	Singer
10	Jang Yoon-jeong	Singer

=== 2022 ===
Rank	Name	Profession
1	BTS	Boy group
2	Blackpink	Girl group
3	Son Heung-min	Football player
4	Hyun-jin Ryu	Baseball player
5	Lee Chan-won	Singer
6	Lee Seung-gi	Singer, actor, TV host
7	Lim Young-woong	Singer
8	Youn Yuh-jung	Actress
9	Yoo Jae-suk	Comedian, TV host
10	Jang Minho	Singer

=== 2023 ===
Rank	Name	Profession
1	BTS	Boy group
2	Son Heung-min	Football player
3	Blackpink	Girl group
4	Song Joong-ki	Actor
5	Yoo Jae-suk	Comedian, TV host
6	Lim Young-woong	Singer
7	Son Suk-ku	Actor
8	Jang Minho	Singer
9	Jang Yoon-jeong	Singer
10	Young Tak	Singer

=== 2024 ===
Rank	Name	Profession
1	Blackpink	Girl group
2	Son Heung-min	Football player
3	NewJeans	Girl group
4	Kim Min-jae	Football player
5	Lim Young-woong	Singer
6	Lee Jung-hoo	Baseball player
7	Jimin	Singer
8	Lee Kang-in	Football player
9	Jungkook	Singer
10	Ive	Girl group

=== 2025 ===
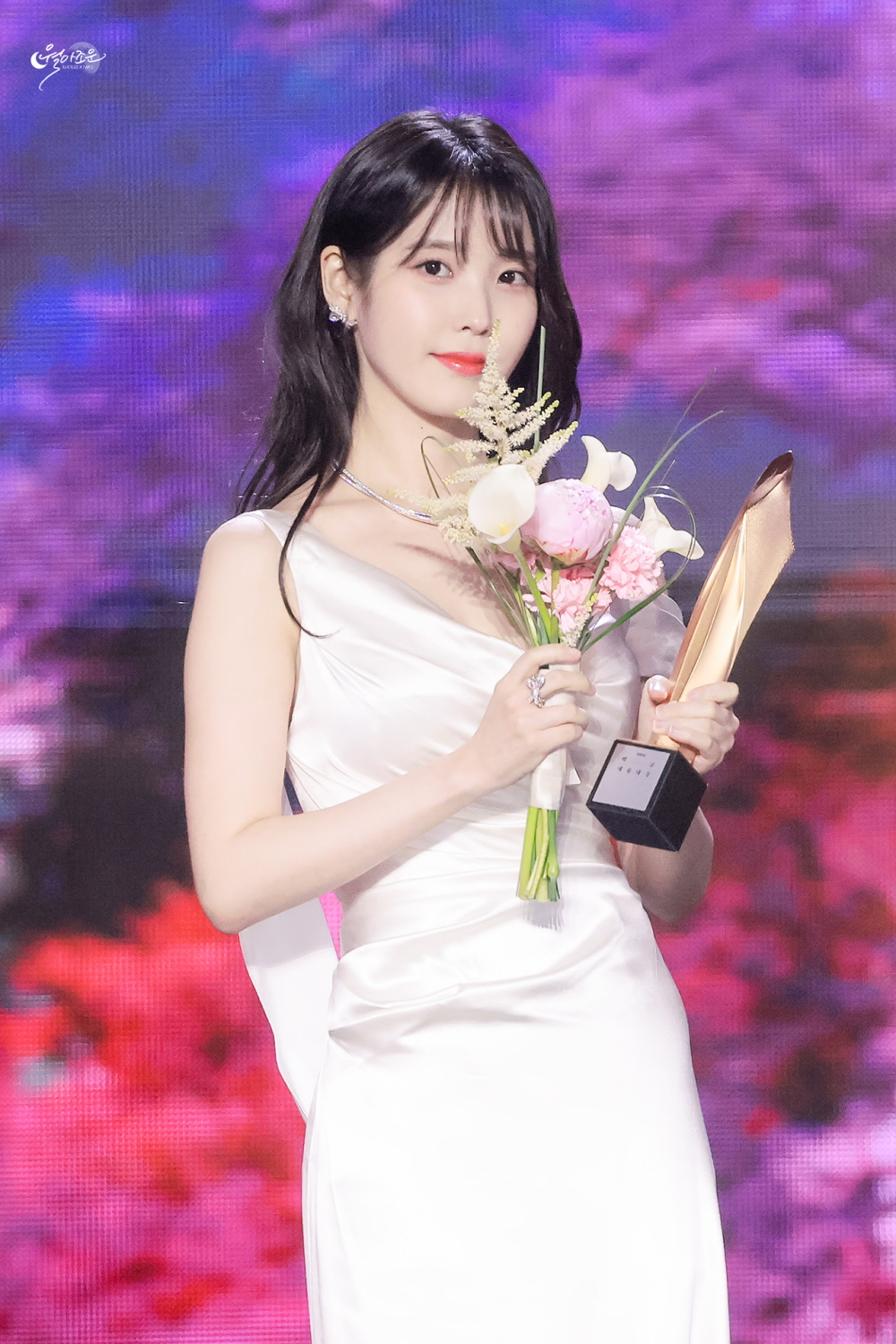
Singer, actress IU

Rank	Name	Profession
1	IU	Singer, actress
2	Son Heung-min	Football player
3	Aespa	Girl group
4	Jun Hyun-moo	TV host
5	Lim Young-woong	Singer
6	Lee "Faker" Sang-hyeok	Professional gamer
7	Lee Jung-hoo	Baseball player
8	Seventeen	Boy group
9	Lee Kang-in	Football player
10	Yoo Jae-suk	Comedian, TV host

=== 2026 ===
Rank	Name	Profession
1	BTS	Boy Group
2	G-Dragon	Singer
3	Blackpink	Girl group
4	Son Heung-min	Football player
5	Lim Young-woong	Singer
6	Jin	Singer
7	V	Singer
8	Jung Kook	Singer
9	Lee Jung-hoo	Baseball player
10	J-Hope	Singer

== Special recognition ==
For the 2026 edition, Forbes Korea introduced an official voting process through the Mnet Plus platform to factor fan support into the final rankings. The celebrity who secures the first place is awarded a physical winner's trophy and receives exclusive promotional rewards, including online PR and a featured advertisement in the Forbes Korea magazine. This voting system allows the public to have a direct voice in identifying the "Top Power Celebrity" of the year by evaluating public influence and cultural impact alongside the list's traditional metrics.
