= Jang Minho =

South Korean singer (born 1977)

- 장민호
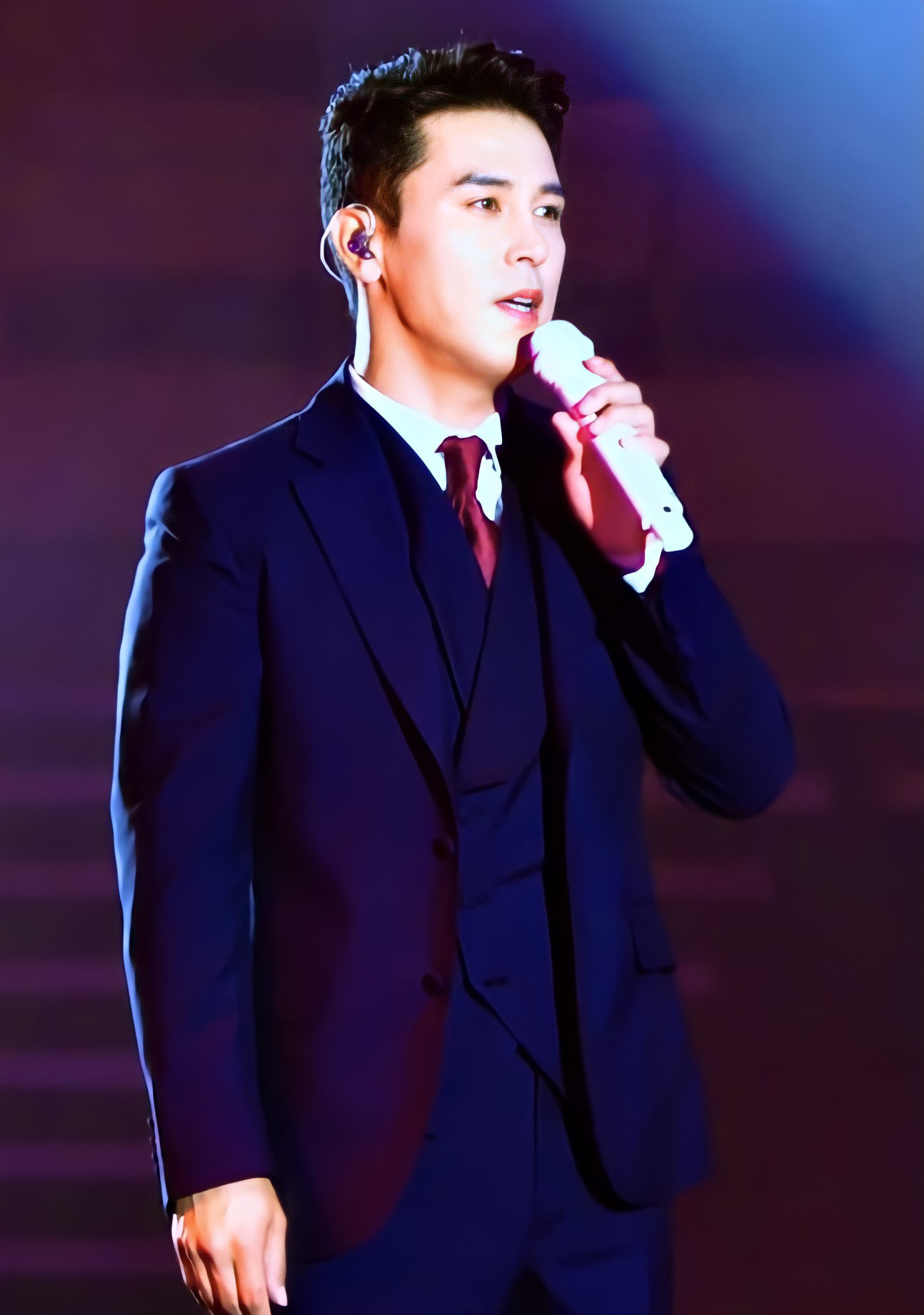
- Born: Jang Ho-geun; 11 September 1977 (age 49); Busan, South Korea
- Other name: Jang-goon
- Education: Dankook University
- Occupations: Singer; actor; TV presenter; YouTuber
- Years active: 1995–present
- Musical career
- Genres: K-pop; Trot
- Years active: 1997–present
- Label: Ho Entertainment
- Formerly of: U-BeS; Baram

YouTube information
- Channel: 장민호
- Subscribers: 265,000
- Views: 47 millions
- Last updated: 3 May 2021

Korean name
- Hangul: 장호근
- Hanja: 張豪根
- RR: Jang Hogeun
- MR: Chang Hogŭn

Stage name
- Hangul: 장민호
- Hanja: 張民好
- RR: Jang Minho
- MR: Chang Minho

Signature
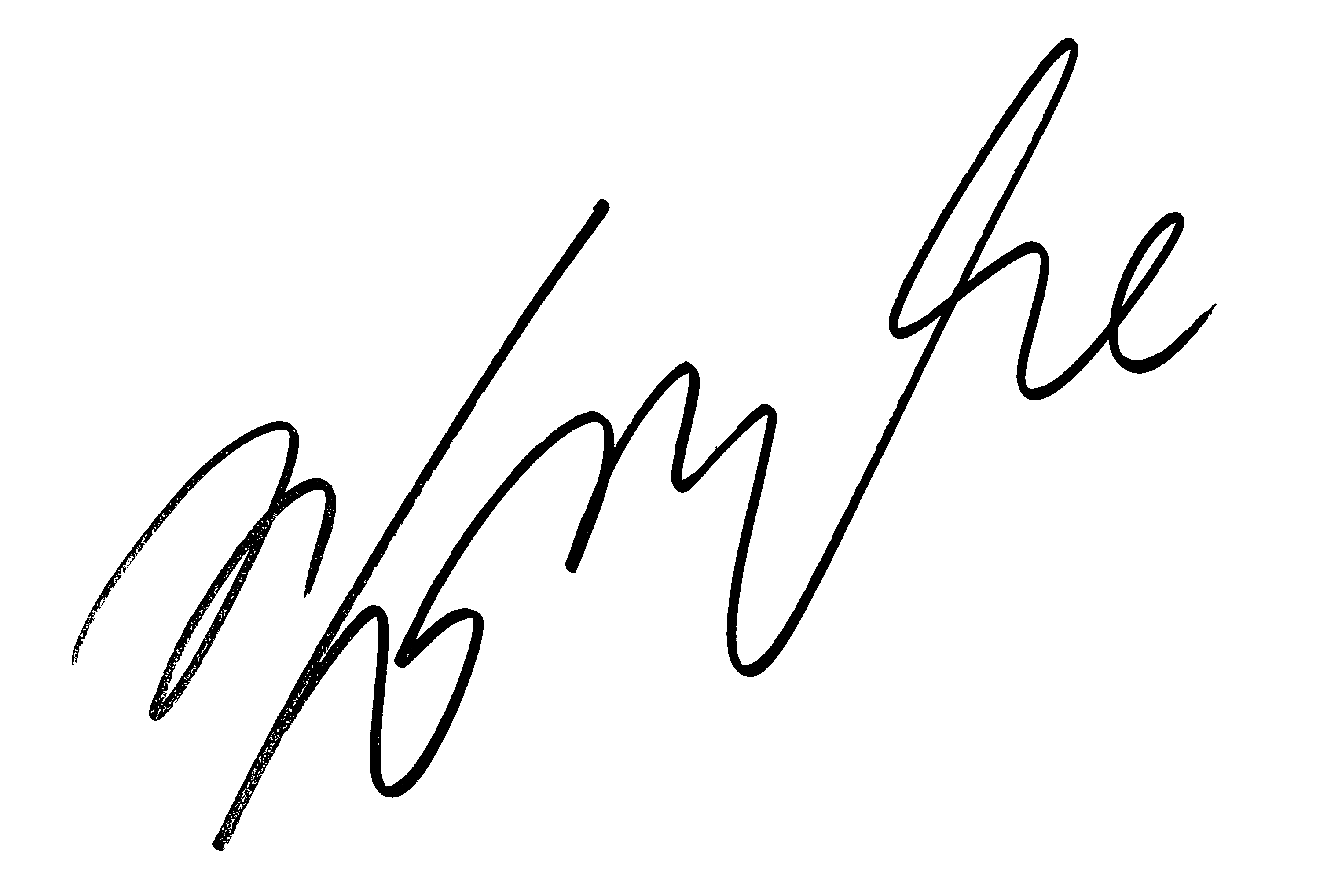

Jang Ho-geun (Korean: 장호근, born 11 September 1977), known professionally as Jang Minho (장민호), is a South Korean singer. He competed in the TV Chosun audition show Mr. Trot, placing in the top sixth. He is also a model, dancer, and TV presenter.

== Early life ==
Jang Ho-geun was born on 11 September 1977, in Busan and moved to Incheon while he was little. He is the youngest of three siblings. He has a brother and a sister. When he was a high school student, he went to acting school in Seoul from Incheon and did modeling for various TV commercials.

== Career ==
=== Singer debut as a leader of an idol group U-BeS (1997–1999) ===
Jang started his musical career as a leader of the Korean idol group U-BeS in 1997. At that time, he used his real name. He spent a year before debut as a trainee for practicing singing and dancing with his group members. The group released two regular albums but disbanded due to poor album sales and disagreements with the agency. He revealed in a 2020 interview that they were often physically beaten by the head of the agency. Those events gave Jang severe mental trauma, and he later contemplated about quitting the entertainment industry. U-BeS' official time of disbandment was never announced officially, however the 2011 interview with CJ E&M enewsWorld reported it was 1999.

=== K-Pop duo Baram (2004–2005) ===
After five years of hiatus, he formed a pop duo Baram (meaning 'wind' in Korean) with Seo Woo in 2004. Baram released the album Just like a wind. He used the stage name Jang-goon. Son Dam-bi before her debut appeared in their music video To Love (사랑하다). Baram wasn't successful in Korea though they received some attention in China.

=== Beginnings as a trot singer (2011–2019) ===
Jang was enlisted in 2007 and was released in 2009. He graduated from graduate school (Performing Arts Major in Dankook Graduate School of Cultural Arts and Design), and tried to get a job as a steward in a foreign airline with his Chinese skills. Jang met the CEO of his current agency (a manager back then) in grad school, and was persuaded into making a comeback. In 2011 after a year of preparation, he released his trot debut single, Love you, Nuna using his new stage name Jang Minho. His first trot single was a commercial failure. In 2012 he participated KBS's audition show 'Last Audition of My Life' and won the contest along with singer-songwriter, LEN as a duo. Despite Jang and LEN won the contest, KBS hasn't done any support as they promised for the show's final winners. Two months after the contest Jang released the EP The Man Says (남자는 말합니다). Although the album did not get much attention when released, the title song "The Man Says" began to gain popularity and became his signature song. The song earned him a nickname omtongnyong (a compound word of mom and president).

=== Mr. Trot and popularity (2020–present) ===
In 2020 he was a finalist on the Mr. Trot reality television show, placing sixth. Mr. Trot surpassed a 30 percent viewership rating, highest was 35.7 percent and over 7.7 million text message-based votes were cast during the two-hour program, a record for TV audition shows. Owing to his popularity after the competition, he won first place in a survey to "pick the best trot singer," with 294,730 votes. Also, he ranked fifteenth on a Singer Brand Reputation rank of July 2020. The same year he created his YouTube channel and gained over 20,000 subscribers in 2 hours. He is an advertising model and spokesperson. According to Ildong Foodis, they increased the product sales 7.8 billion KRW the first half of 2020 by hiring him as a model. In early 2022, Ildong Foodis announced Himmune, known as Jang Minho Protein, has accumulated 130 billion KRW in cumulative sales.

Beginning on 6 May 2022, Jang embarked on the joint concert tour 'Min-Won Satisfied' with Lee Chan-won. Tickets for the concert, performing in four cities, were sold out all 16,000 seats as soon as they opened.

Starting from Seoul at Olympic Hall, Olympic Park on 4 November 2022, Jang performs on his solo concert tour Ho-sijeol (Good old days) in seven cities, including Daegu and Busan. It's his second solo concert since the first solo concert Drama in 2021.

== Personal life ==
Despite his birthday being on 11 September, he tends to celebrate by the lunar calendar (28 July). Fans often misunderstand and also get confused because the lunar calendar changes the date every year. He received a master's degree in Performing Arts from Dankook University Graduate School of Culture and Arts. Jang is fluent in Chinese.

== Others ==
Jang has been sponsoring three children through Compassion Korea (한국컴패션) since 2009. Also he is active member of Compassion Band since 2006.

He writes lyrics and composes songs. He wrote the lyrics for his fellow singer Namgoong Moonjeong's song "Goodbye my youth" (잘있거라 내청춘) with the songwriter JMStyle. He wrote the lyrics and co-composed one of fans' favorite songs "You know my name" thinking of his late father.

On 21 March 2021, his fans celebrated the 10th anniversary of his trot debut. They posted congratulatory advertisements on the billboards of bus stops, subway stations, and shopping malls, etc. In particular, his overseas fans even sent congratulatory videos to Times Square in New York.

Gallup Korea has revealed the results of its annual survey of the most loved artists and songs of the year. Jang ranked the eighth as the most influential singer with 8.5 percent of the vote in the over-40 age bracket.

== Discography ==
=== Studio albums ===
| Title | Album details | Peak chart positions | Sales |
| Title | Album details | KOR | Sales |
|---|---|---|---|
| Drama (장민호 드라마) | Released: 2 January 2017; Label: Wings Entertainment, Kakao Entertainment; Formats: CD, digital download; Track list: 1. "Yeol-li-ji 연리지 (連理枝); 2. "Drama 드라마; 3. "The Man Says 남자는 말합니다; 4. "He Knows My Name 내 이름 아시죠; 5. "Life Like a Wind 바람같은 인생; 6. "Man vs. Man 남자 대 남자; 7. "My Brother 내 동생; 8. "Love you, Nuna 사랑해 누나; 9. "Mercury Lamp 수은등; 10. "The Man Says" 남자는 말합니다 (Jpn Ver.); 11. "The Man Says" 남자는 말합니다 (Chn Ver.); 12. "Yeol-li-ji" 연리지 (instrumental); 13. "Dram" 드라마 (instrumental); 14. "The Man Says" 남자는 말합니다 (instrumental); 15. "Man vs. Man" 남자대 남자 (instrumental); 16. "He Knows My Name" 내 이름 아시죠 (instrumental) | — | |
| Eternal | Released: 8 November 2022; Label: Ho Entertainment; Formats: CD, digital download; Track list: 1. "Love, Was It You?" (사랑 너였니); 2. "Love Wine" (와인 한잔해요); 3. "Hope Train" (희망열차); 4. "Heart is Crying" (가슴이 울어); 5. "Born Singer" (노래하고 싶어); 6. "A Shoelace" (신발끈); 7. "Time Machine" (타임머신); 8. "Hate & Love" (미워야 연인이라 했나요); 9. "Tears Are Falling" (눈물이 뚝뚝); 10. "Play the Music!" (풍악을 울려라!) | 2 | KOR: 124,535 |

=== Extended plays ===
| Title | EP details | Peak chart positions | Sales |
| Title | EP details | KOR | Sales |
|---|---|---|---|
| The Man Says (남자는 말합니다) | Released: 16 May 2013; Label: Wings Entertainment, Elijah Entertainment; Formats: CD, digital download; Track list: 1. "My Brother" 내 동생; 2. "Life Like a Wind" 바람같은 인생; 3. "The Man Says" 남자는 말합니다; 4. "Love You, Nuna" 사랑해 누나; 5. "Mercury Lamp 수은등; 6. "The Man Says" 남자는 말합니다 (Jpn Ver.); 7. "The Man Says" 남자는 말합니다 (Chn Ver.); 8. "My Brother" 내 동생 (instrumental); 9. "The Man Says" 남자는 말합니다 (instrumental) | — | |
| Essay ep.1 (에세이 ep. 1) | Released: 6 January 2022; Label: Ho Entertainment, Kakao Entertainment; Formats: CD, digital download; Track list: 1. "Thank You and Sorry My Love" 고맙고 미안한 내사랑; 2. "Blunt" 무뚝뚝; 3. "Right Answer" 정답은 없다; 4. "Row a Row" 저어라; 5. "Only One Miracle" 한 번뿐인 기적; 6. "Thank You and Sorry My Love" 고맙고 미안한 내사랑 (Inst.); 7. "Blunt" 무뚝뚝 (Inst.); 8. "Right Answer" 정답은 없다 (Inst.); 9. "Row a Row" 저어라 (Inst.); 10. "Only One Miracle" 한 번뿐인 기적 (Inst.) | 7 | KOR: 37,660 |
| Essay ep. 2 (에세이 ep.2) | Released: 30 October 2023; Label: Ho Entertainment, Kakao Entertainment; Formats: CD, digital download; Track list: 1. "Flowery Days" 꽃처럼 피던 시절; 2. "Swish" 휘리릭; 3. "We Were Young" 그때 우린 젊었다; 4. "One Last Wish" 소원; 5. "Anima" 아! 님아 | 6 | KOR: 102,128 |
| Essay ep. 3 (에세이 ep.3) | Released: 28 November 2024; Label: Ho Entertainment, Kakao Entertainment; Formats: CD, digital download, streaming; Track list: 1. "Fifty" 오십 (五十); 2. "Tika-taka of Love" 사랑의 티키타카; 3. "Holssi" 홀씨; 4. "Young at Heart" 마음의 나이; 5. "Let's Live" 살자; 6. "Fighting!" 으라차차차 | 6 | KOR: 115,282 |
| Analog Vol. 1 (아날로그 볼륨1) | Released: 14 October 2025; Label: Ho Entertainment, Kakao Entertainment; Formats: CD, digital download, streaming; Track list: 1. "Hankyeryeong Pass" 한계령; 2. "Lonely Love" 홀로된 사랑; 3. "My Reflection in My Heart" 내 마음에 비친 내 모습; 4. "Stay by My Side" 내 곁에 있어주; 5. "I'll Give You the Love I Have Left" 내게 남은 사랑을 드릴께요; 6. "Just a Friend" 그저 친구; 7. "That Day" 그날 | 4 | KOR: 107,696 |

=== Singles ===
| Title | Year | Peak chart positions | Album |
| Title | Year | KOR | Album |
|---|---|---|---|
| "Love you, Nuna" (사랑해 누나) | 2011 | — | The Man Says |
| "The Man Says" (남자는 말합니다) | 2013 | — | The Man Says |
| "Drama" (드라마) | 2017 | — | Drama |
| "Driving Route 7" (7번 국도) | 2017 | — | Non-album singles |
| "The Man Says" (New Ver.) | 2019 | — | Non-album singles |
| "Read and Ignored" (읽씹 안읽씹) | 2020 | 110 | Non-album singles |
| "That's Life" (사는 게 그런 거지) | 2021 | 158 | Non-album singles |
| "Right Answer" (정답은 없다) | 2022 | — (Note: "Right Answer" did not enter the Circle Digital Chart, but it peaked at number 25 on the component Download Chart.) | Essay ep. 1 |
| "Hoechori" (회초리) | 2022 | — (Note: "Hoechori" did not enter the Circle Digital Chart, but it peaked at number 33 on the component Download Chart.) | Non-album single |
| "Love, Was It You?" (사랑 너였니) | 2022 | — (Note: "Love, Was It You?" did not enter the Circle Digital Chart, but it peaked at number 20 on the component Download Chart.) | Eternal |
| "Diary of Life" (인생일기) | 2023 | — (Note: "Diary of Life" did not enter the Circle Digital Chart, but it peaked at number 13 on the component Download Chart.) | Non-album single |
| "We Were Young" (그때 우린 젊었다) | 2023 | — (Note: "We Were Young" did not enter the Circle Digital Chart, but it peaked at number 17 on the component Download Chart.) | Essay ep. 2 |
| "Love, Was It You?" (Remix Ver.) | 2024 | TBA | Non-album single |

=== Soundtrack appearances ===
| Title | Year | Album |
|---|---|---|
| "Hit the Jackpot" (대박 날 테다) | 2020 | Kkondae Intern OST (꼰대인턴) |

=== Other album appearances ===
Jang's performances on various television shows have been released on numerous compilation albums. These shows include Last Audition of My Life (2012–2013), Mr. Trot (2020), Romantic Call Centre (2020–2021), and Ppongsoonah School (2020–2021).

=== Writing credits ===
All song credits are adapted from the Korea Music Copyright Association's database.

| Title | Year | Artist | Album | Note(s) |
|---|---|---|---|---|
| "You Know My Name" (내 이름 아시죠) | 2017 | Jang Minho | Drama | Lyricist and co-composer |
| "Goodbye My Youth" (잘있거라 내청춘) | 2018 | Namgoong Moonjung (남궁문정) | Story of Man (남자 이야기) | Co-lyricist |
| "Black Herbal Tea" (쌍화차) | 2018 | Yoon Oh (윤오) | Non-album single | Co-lyricist |
| "Born Singer" (노래하고싶어) | 2022 | Jang Minho | Eternal | Co-lyricist and composer |
| "Swish" (휘리릭) | 2023 | Jang Minho | Essay ep. 2 | Lyricist and composer |

== Filmography ==
=== Film ===
| Title | Year | Role(s) | Note(s) |
|---|---|---|---|
| Mr. Trot: The Movie (미스터트롯 : 더 무비) | 2020 | Himself (as a member of Mr. Trot's Top 6) | Musical documentary |
| Drama, the Final Episode | 2022 | Himself | Musical documentary |

=== Variety show – regular cast & presenter ===
| Year | Title | Note(s) |
|---|---|---|
| 2019–20 | Oh My Singer (오 마이 싱어) | Co-host, episodes 1–40, 45–46 |
| 2020–21 | Romantic Call Centre (사랑의 콜센타) | Main cast, episodes 1–72 |
| 2020–21 | Ppongsunga School (뽕숭아학당) | Main cast, episodes 1–72 |
| 2020–21 | Miss Trot | Judge in season 2, all episodes |
| 2021 | Be My Daughter (내 딸 하자) | Co-host, episodes 1–20 |
| 2021–present | King of Golf (골프왕) | Main cast in all Fours seasons |
| 2021–22 | Godfather | Main cast |
| 2021–present | It's Tuesday Night (화요일은 밤이 좋아)) | Co-host |
| 2022–present | Fan Heart Contest (주접이 풍년) | Co-host |
| 2022–present | Mama Was Pretty | Co-host |
| 2022–present | Star Birth | Star maker |
| 2022–present | Our Trot (Our Show 10) | Co-host |
| 2022–present | Mr. Trot 2 | Judge (announced) |
| 2023 | Show Queen | Host |

=== Variety show – guest ===
| Year | Title | Episode | Network |
|---|---|---|---|
| 2011 | 1000 Song Challenge | | SBS |
| 2013 | You Hee-yeol's Sketchbook | 182nd | KBS2 |
| 2013 | The Clinic for Married Couples: Love and War | | KBS2 |
| 2013 | Sebaqui (세바퀴) | | MBC |
| 2017 | The Mysterious Singer (수상한 가수) | 1st | tvN |
| 2020 | Radio Star (TV series) | Guest : 663rd, 664th, Special MC: 660th | MBC |
| 2020 | Knowing Bros | 229th, 230th, 231st | JTBC |
| 2020 | Taste of Mr. Trot (미스터트롯의 맛) | All 2 episodes | TV Chosun |
| 2020 | The Gentlemen's League (뭉쳐야찬다) | 41st, 42nd | JTBC |
| 2020 | Travelling Market | 10th, 11th | JTBC |
| 2020 | Taste of Wife (아내의 맛) | 95th | TV Chosun |
| 2020 | Bob Bless You (밥블레스유 2) | 2x07, 2x08 | OLIVE |
| 2020 | My Little Old Boy | 190th, 191st, 192nd, 193rd | SBS |
| 2020 | Omniscient Interfering View (전지적참견시점) | 105th, 106th (Lee Chan-Won's episode :VCR appearance) | MBC |
| 2020 | Immortal Songs: Singing the Legend | Song Hae episode | KBS2 |
| 2020 | Golden Oldies (가요무대) | | KBS1 |
| 2020 | Stars' Top Recipe at Fun-Staurant (신상출시 편스토랑) | 37th, 38th, 39th | KBS2 |
| 2020 | Surprising Saturday (놀라운 토요일) | 116th | tvN |
| 2020 | Hidden Singer | Season 6 Premiere | JTBC |
| 2021 | Tuesday War Blue vs. White (화요청백전) | 3rd | JTBC |
| 2021 | I Like Songs (노래가 좋아) | 237th | KBS2 |

=== Television series ===
| Year | Title | Role(s) | Note(s) |
|---|---|---|---|
| 2011 | The Thorn Birds | Lee Soo-young | Cameo in episodes 19 and 20 |
| 2020 | Kingmaker: The Change of Destiny | Himself | Special celebrity appearance with Young Tak, Lim Young-woong, Lee Chan-won on ep. 11 |

=== Radio show ===
| Title | Airdate | Network | Note(s) |
|---|---|---|---|
| 9595 Show with Bae Chilsoo, Park Heejin (배칠수, 박희진의 9595쇼) | 10 April 2020 | TBS FM | Guest |
| Boom Boom Power (붐붐파워) | 20 April 2020 | SBS Power FM | Guest |
| Mr. Radio (미스터 라디오) | 13 July 2020 | KBS Cool FM | Guest |
| Kim Hyunjoo's Happy Accompany (김현주의 행복한 동행) | 14 July 2020 | CBS Music FM | Guest |
| Let's Meet at Noon (12시에 만납시다) | 16 July 2020 | CBS Music FM | Guest with Jung Dongwon |
| Choi Ilgu's Hurricane Radio (최일구의 허리케인 라디오) | 16 July 2020 | TBS FM | Guest with Lim Young-woong, Lee Chan won |
| Jo Woojong's FM March (조우종의 FM대행진) | 28 September 2020 | KBS Cool FM | Guest |
| Melon Trot Show (멜론 트롯쇼) | 10, 16, 23 February | Melon Station | Host (as a member of Mr. Trot's Top 6) |

=== Audition show ===
Judge

- 2021 Miss Trot (season 2)

Contender

- 2012 KBS2 TV Last audition of my life (내 생애 마지막 오디션) – winner
- 2020 TV Chosun Mr. Trot – in which Jang came top sixth

=== Commercial film ===
- 1995 Nongshim – Lotte Ssalo Byeol Original Rice Cracker
- 1995 JCH System – Sound Blaster
- 1996 Lotte Confectionery – Brain Gum
- 2020 Ildong Foodis – Himmune Protein Balance
- 2020 Theraderm
- 2020 Dongmoon Construction – Good Morning Hill: Mom City
- 2020 Mr. Pizza with Young Tak, Lee Chan-Won
- 2020 Samsung Fire & Marine Insurance with Jeong Dong-won
- 2020 Daesung Celtic Enersys
- 2021 Aekyung Group – Home Vaccine

== Concerts and tours ==
First national solo tour Drama (15 October – 5 December 2021)

- 15–17 Oct. 2021: Seoul – Olympic Hall
- 23–24 Oct. 2021: Busan – Busan KBS Hall
- 6–7 November 2021: Daegu – EXCO (Daegu Exhibition & Convention Center)
- 13–14 Nov. 2021: Incheon – Songdo Convensia
- 20–21 Nov. 2021: Ulsan – Ulsan KBS Hall
- 27–28 Nov. 2021: Seongnam – Seongnam Arts Center
- 4–5 December 2021: Changwon – Changwon KBS Hall

Mr. Trot concerts

- 7–16 August 2020: Seoul – KSPO Dome
- 30 Oct.–1 Nov. 2020: Busan – BEXCO
- 6–8 Nov. 2020: Gwangju – Gwangju Women's University Universiade Gymnasium
- 12–15 Nov. 2020: Seoul – KSPO Dome

== Awards ==
| Year | Award | Category | Nominated work | Result | Ref. |
|---|---|---|---|---|---|
| 2015 | Korea Talent Donation Awards | Grand Prize award | —N/a | Won | |
| 2015 | The 3rd Korea Creative Art Awards | Rookie of the year | "The Man Says" | Won | |
| 2015 | Korea Star Art Awards | Rookie of the year | "The Man Says" | Won | |
| 2017 | Korea Multicultural Awards | Trot / Popularity award | —N/a | Won | |
| 2017 | Korea Arts Awards | Trot / Popularity award | —N/a | Won | |
| 2017 | International K-Star Awards | Trot / Popularity award | —N/a | Won | |
| 2018 | Gayo TV Music Awards | Excellence award | —N/a | Won | |
| 2018 | Proud Korean Awards | Popularity award | "The Man Says" | Won | |
| 2020 | MTN Broadcasting & Advertisement Festival | New Star award | —N/a | Won | |
| 2020 | 2020 Melon Music Awards | Hot Trend Award (as a member of Mr. Trot's Top 6) | Mr. Trot | Won | |
| 2020 | APAN Music Awards | APAN Choice Best K-Trot award | —N/a | Won | |
| 2021 | CICI Korea Image Awards | Stepping Stone Award (as a member of Mr. Trot's Top 6) | —N/a | Won | |
| 2021 | 19th KBS Entertainment Awards | Excellence Award in Reality Category | Godfather | Won | |
| 2025 | Mega Champ Awards | Best Singer award | —N/a | Won | |
| 2026 | Korea Drama Awards | Best OST | Only One – "Recipe for Love" | Won | |

=== Listicles ===
Name of publisher, year listed, name of listicle, and placement
| Publisher | Year | Listicle | Placement | Ref. |
|---|---|---|---|---|
| Forbes | 2021 | Korea Power Celebrity 40 | 15th | |
| Forbes | 2022 | Korea Power Celebrity 40 | 10th | |

== See also ==
- U-BeS
- The Man Says
- Drama
- You Know My Name
