= Young Tak =

South Korean singer (born 1983)

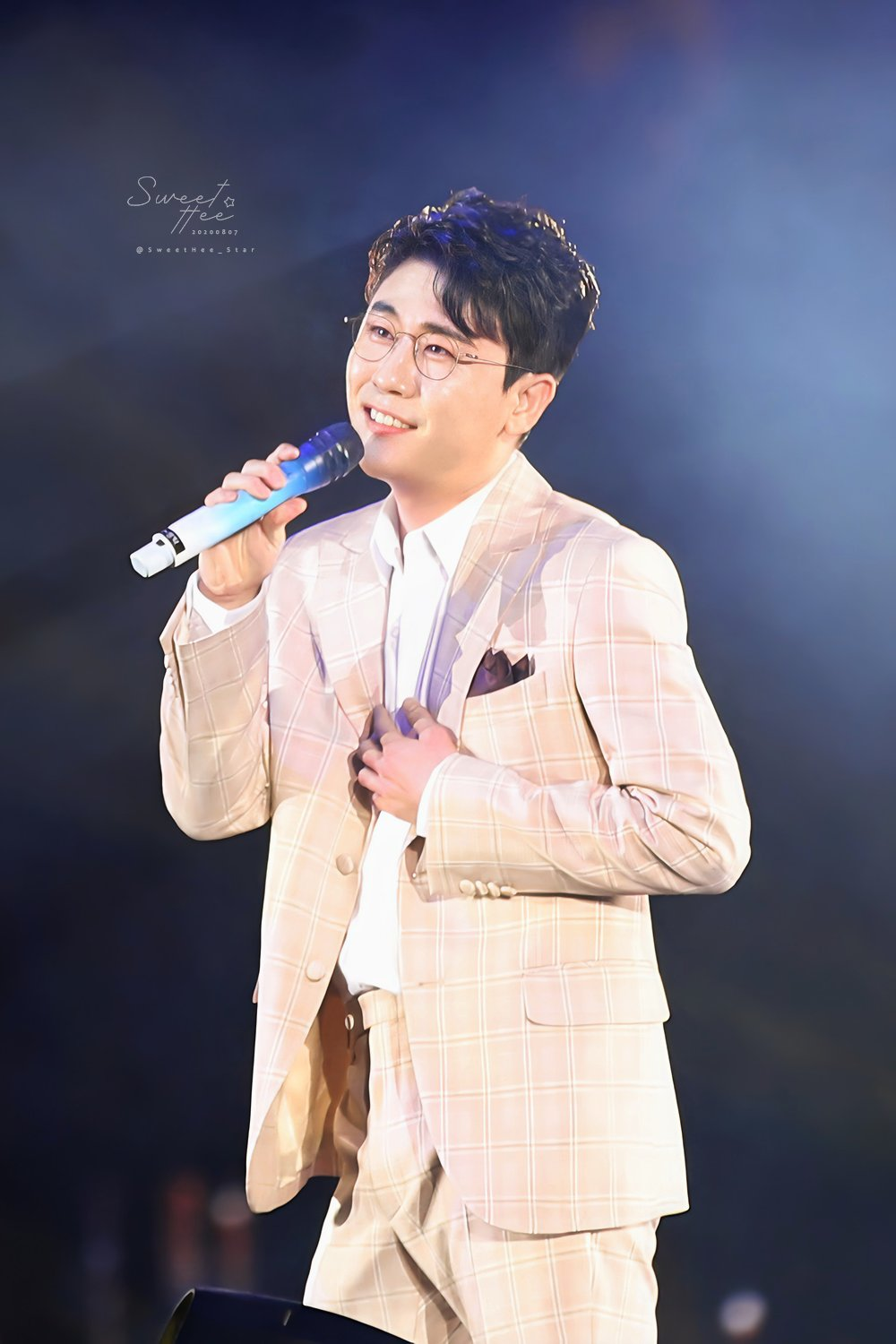
- Young Tak in 2020
- Born: Park Young-tak; 13 May 1983 (age 43); Andong, South Korea
- Education: Kookmin University
- Occupations: Singer; songwriter; actor; TV personality
- Musical career
- Genres: Trot; ballad
- Instruments: Vocals; piano
- Years active: 2007–present
- Labels: Milagro Entertainment; New Era Project; TakStudio; Abyss Company

Korean name
- Hangul: 박영탁
- Hanja: 朴永卓
- RR: Bak Yeongtak
- MR: Pak Yŏngt'ak

Signature
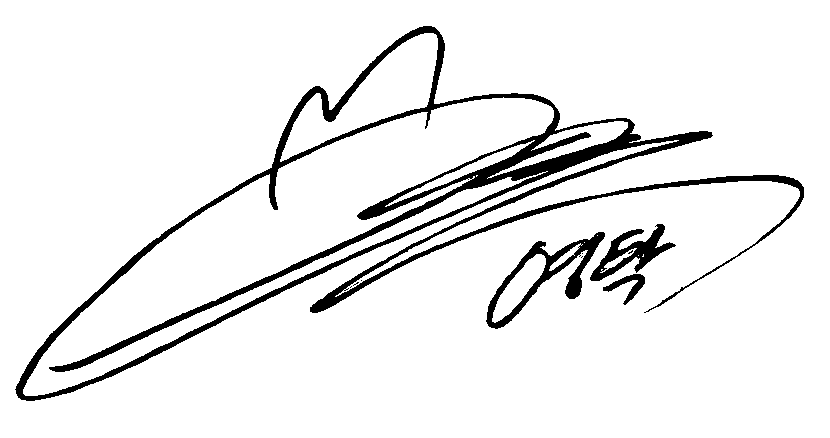

Park Young-tak (Korean: 박영탁; born 13 May 1983), credited mononymously as Young Tak (영탁, commonly stylized as YOUNGTAK), is a South Korean singer, songwriter, actor and television personality. He made his debut in 2007 as a ballad singer with his 1st album Young Tak Disia. In 2016, he started his trot career with the release of his first trot single album, Nuna You Are Perfect. In 2020, he became well known by placing second in the TV Chosun audition show Mr. Trot out of 17,000 participants with his biggest hit "Jjiniya".

== Early life and education ==
Park was born in Mungyeong, South Korea. His father was a soldier and his mother was a civil servant who worked for telephone service. His grandfather was a music teacher and composer, who served as principal and taught music at a senior college. Park's grandfather composed many school songs for local schools in Gyeongsang-do. Park was a member of Andong MBC Children's Choir (안동MBC 어린이 합창단). Park has rhinitis, which causes nasal congestion and often interferes with his breathing. When he was in high school, Park suffered from an accident where he fell from the 3rd floor of his school building. This resulted in his ankles being broken into 30 pieces and must be fixed with screws permanently, therefore he was exempted from military service. However, Park himself wanted to finish the service, so later on he enlisted at the training center, but was still exempted from military service during the re-examination.

Park attended Yeongga Elementary School, Andong Middle School and All-boys boarding Andong High School. Park majored in Advertising and Public relations at Cheongju University, and completed a Master's degree in Practical Music Composition at Kookmin University Graduate School of Arts. He was also an Adjunct professor at the Department of Applied Music at Sehan University.

== Career ==
=== 2004–2015: Years as a ballad singer ===
In 2004, Park Young-tak entered The 1st Yeongnam Song Festival contest and won the first prize. He used the prize money (₩1,000,000) to move to Seoul and work on becoming a singer. Park started out by singing OST for the movie Marrying the Mafia II (2005). In January 2007, Park won the rookie singer contest hosted by Snow Rain Cast (Hangul: 눈비캐스트) and released his digital album 'Youngtak's DISIA' ('DISIA' is short for 'Digital Single Album') as the prize. He was recognized for his singing ability with his 1st ballad single "I Love You" (사랑한다).

In 2008, Park and Seo Dong-hoon formed a duo called Let It Be (렛잇비) and sang OST for OCN drama My Lady Boss, My Hero. They were in the middle of preparation for their album when their agency faced difficulties. Park and Seo then joined Star King with Min Geum-yong and Lee Woo-ram as Country Kids' Soul—supposedly a parody group of Brown Eyed Soul. They won first place and a contract with a music company to debut as a four-member ballad group named L-Class (엘클래스) He wrote their debut song "Please Don't Go" (가지 말라고). They worked together for two years, released two singles and disbanded in 2011.

Park later became part of a ballad duo called J-Symphony (제이심포니; J-심포니) with ex L-Class member Min Geum-yong (민금용). They released 3 singles, sang original soundtracks for dramas such as City Hunter, 49 Days, et cetera, and even had activities in Japan before part away in 2012. In the meantime, Park continued his music works by singing OSTs for cartoons, dramas and movies; singing guides for famous singers and groups such as Super Junior-H, Davichi, Park Hyoshin, SG Wannabe, and Hwanhee; writing and producing songs, and more.

In 2014, Park Young-tak and his friend Ji Kwang-min (지광민; stage name: MinZi (민지)) formed a multi-genre duo called Park G (박지, a.k.a. Park-Ji, "Park" and "Ji" are their respective last names). They release songs and work together as producers, even after Park has switched to trot.

To make a living, Park became an adjunct professor at Sehan University and voice teacher at music academies. He almost gave up his singing career as it was not a stable job. But when Park joined Hidden Singer 2 as a contestant in Wheesung's episode, his love for singing was resurrected. He decided to work on his voice and sing professionally again.

The 5 contestants in Wheesung's episode: "Love Wheesung" Kim Jin-ho, "SNU Wheesung" Park Joon-young, "Adjunct Professor Wheesung" Park Young-tak, "Trot Wheesung" Je-cheong and "Composer Wheesung" Dason, along with singer Greg Priester formed a group called Wheesung Team (휘성팀) or Wheeteam for short.

On 28 January 2014, they released an R&B/soul single called "Cliché" (똑같은 말) with Park G, which was composed by Park. The song was a homage to Wheesung, produced by Park and MinZi. Wheesung Team guested on shows and sang together at benefit concerts. They did charities together as well and received a testimonial from UNICEF. On 8 December 2015, Wheesung Team released their second single "We Will Get There" (너도 그렇게 걸어줘) to cheer up anyone who is pursuing their dreams. The song was written and produced by Park and Dason's group Joy O'Clock. This is also their message to each other before going on their separate ways: a promise to keep their strong friendships and be supportive of each person's lives and dreams.

=== 2016–2020: Trot career and appearance on Mr. Trot ===
In 2016, Park Young-tak signed a contract with Milagro Entertainment and became a trot singer with the stage name "Young Tak". His CEO co-wrote his trot debut song "Nuna You're Perfect" (누나가 딱이야). He promoted his songs by working as a morning show presenter and a guest singer in singing classes for middle-aged people. His second trot single is called "We Are So Bad" (우리 정말 나쁘다 (演歌)), which received good response from the public. In the same year, he released his first trot duet and MV "Cherry Blossom Love" (사랑의 벚꽃놀이) with Sook Haeng. "Cherry Blossom Love" was given to them by a composer named Kwak Joon-young, who has written songs for Big Mama, Heesung and Naul of Brown Eyed Soul.

Young Tak wrote and produced "Why Are You Coming Out From There" (니가 왜 거기서 나와) in 2018. It is based on the true story of how Young Tak found out his girlfriend was cheating on him. He planned to give the song to his friend Young-ki, who is also a trot singer, but Young-ki said the song was too difficult for him. Jang Min-ho suggested that Young Tak sing this song himself and it became Young Tak's fourth trot single. He also choreographed and came up with the idea for the album's cover as well as the music video on his own. "Why Are You Coming Out From There" went viral in South Korea thanks to kids liking the song and using it for their TikTok videos. The "Grabbing the neck" choreography of the song also became more known by trot lovers.

"Jjiniya" (2020)

Young Tak then auditioned for TV Chosun's Mr. Trot in December 2019 and got his breakthrough thanks to his cover of "A Glass of Makgeolli" (막걸리 한 잔) by Kang Jin in Mr. Trot's Mission 2 – Death Match: 1 VS 1. After the episode was aired, his cover got 1.2 million downloads in one week. Young Tak became a household name throughout South Korea and earned his nickname "Takgeolli". Then at the Semi Final - 1st Round: Individual Match (Legend Mission), he once again pulled off a flawless performance of "You Who Are Going Back To Memories" (추억으로 가는 당신) by Joo Hyun-mi - a song well-known for its complex rhythm. Young Tak received high praises from the original singer herself and all the judges, which earned him another nickname "Rhythm Tak".

In the final round of the competition, where all the top 7 finalists got to choose one totally new and original song to perform, Young Tak chose "Jjin-iya" (찐이야) and the song, along with the thumb dance that he choreographed himself, became Mr. Trot's best hit. Young Tak came 2nd in the end and signed a 1-year and 6 months contract with New Era Project with other singers called Top 6.

=== 2020–2021: Post-Mr. Trot ===
==== Acting and variety shows ====
From April 2020 to October 2021, Young Tak was a fixed cast in TV Chosun's shows Romantic Call Centre (사랑의 콜센타) and Mister Trot F4 Academy (뽕숭아학당), both have huge ratings. Young Tak is the one who has the highest one-minute footage rating that audiences watch the most in the history of Romantic Call Centre with 22.08% (according to TNMS) when he sang "A Glass of Makgeolli" in the first episode. He also guested in a lot of variety shows with the rest of Top 6.

Young Tak started gaining experience as an actor back when he starred in a musical called "The Three Generals of the Kingdom" (왕의 나라 삼태사) in 2019. In May 2020, he sang Kkondae Intern's OST "Kkondae Latte" (꼰대라떼) and had a special appearance in 3 episodes. He also played a cameo in TV Chosun's Kingmaker: The Change of Destiny.

On 22 October 2020, Young Tak and Top 6 Mr. Trot finalists appeared as main stars in the musical documentary film "Mr. Trot: The Movie", which was exclusively released by Lotte. The documentary film was a commercial success, selling more than 150,000 tickets after 3 weeks of release.

==== Awards as a trot singer ====
On 1 October 2020, Young Tak received "Rising Star Award" at 2020 Trot Awards, which was specifically selected by 108 PDs from all broadcast stations instead of fanvotes like other categories. He also performed his mega hit song "Why Are You Coming Out From There" (니가 왜 거기서 나와) as one of the celebration performances. Young Tak attracted viewers' attention with his vocal skills and bright energy.

Moreover, when Young Tak sang his hit song "Jjiniya" (찐이야) at 2020 Melon Music Awards, his performance immediately went viral on many social media platforms due to the lyrics sounding like BTS member Jin's name. The lyrics "Jin Jin Jin" trended in real time across Twitter, YouTube and Weibo. "Jin Jin Jin" ranked not only on the Twitter Trends Worldwide but also Top Twitter Trends in numerous overseas countries, including the US. Jjiniya was nominated for Best Trot Song at the award as well.

On 30 December 2020, Young Tak sang "Kkondae Latte" (꼰대라떼) and "Jjiniya" (찐이야) as celebration performance at 2020 MBC Drama Awards. Not only did Young Tak received good reactions from all the actors, actresses and viewers, but his celebration stage also recorded an audience rating of 6.5% (according to TNMS) - the highest one minute mark of the award.

==== Recognition as a trot composer and producer ====
Meanwhile, Young Tak continuously writes and produces songs for his colleagues and acquaintances, which he does mostly for free. In a span of eight months after the contest ended, he had written and produced many songs, 7 of which were officially released in 2020 and were well received. On 5 December 2020, Young Tak won the Best Songwriter Award at the Melon Music Awards. He received the Hot Trend Award (with Top 6) that night as well.

On 10 February 2021, Young Tak released his first single after Mr. Trot. The song is called "Comforter" (이불), which he wrote to "warm people's heart during a hard time". Young Tak also dedicated this song to his fandom "My People" (내사람들).

On 25 February 2021, Young Tak appeared on Miss Trot 2 not only as a guest performer, but also as one of the composers for Miss Trot 2 Final: Composer Mission. He wrote "Magnifying Glass" (돋보기)—a dance trot song inspired by the magnifying glass icon that appears when searching a portal site, which was chosen by contestant Byul Sa-rang. Her performance received the second highest score from the masters.

On 14 April 2021, Top 6 member and Mr. Trot finalist Kim Hee-jae's debut single "Follow Me" (따라따라와) was released. Composed by Young Tak and Ji Kwang-min as a gift for Heejae, "Follow Me" is said to be the first ever "disco-style Trendy Trot" song, creating a whole new genre of trot and popularizing the term "Trot idol". The song charted immediately and the reviews were positive from both critics and the public.

On 4 July 2021, Young Tak was announced to participate in the lineup for Pepsi x Starship's 2021 Pepsi Taste of Korea Campaign.

On 11 July 2021, Part 7 of Revolutionary Sisters original soundtrack was released, including "Okay" (오케이) performed by Young Tak. He also participated in composing and writing lyrics for this song. It ranked first on Melon's trot genre chart as soon as it was released, topped the Melon OST Hot Track and acquired high position on Korean music platforms. "Okay" won Outstanding K-Drama OST at the 16th Seoul International Drama Awards, further proving Young Tak's ability as a singer-songwriter.

On 14 October 2021, Korean press reported that Young Tak had produced a semi-trot song for the solo debut of MJ (Astro), which features singer Kim Tae-yeon from Miss Trot 2. The song is called "Get Set Yo" (계세요) and was released on 3 November. With a novel combination of funk and trot, "Get Set Yo" won first place on the South Korean music program The Trot Show on 29 November and became the first trot song produced by Young Tak to do so.

=== 2022: First full album MMM and first solo concert Tak Show ===
In January 2022, Young Tak became a regular cast of Channel A's Nowadays Men's Life: Groom's Class (요즘 남자 라이프 신랑수업). On 31 January 2022, he starred in a Lunar New Year special trot musical on KBS2 named "Thank You Everyone, Song Hae" (여러분 고맙습니다 송해), which recorded a rating of 12.7% nationwide, ranking first in its timeslot.

On 10 February 2022, Young Tak released his first comeback single after one year called "Wanna Go Get Some Abalone" (전복 먹으러 갈래). The pop-trot song's uniqueness quickly caught attention and Young Tak was chosen to be Ambassador for Abalone of Wando County. Furthermore, when Young Tak was promoting "Wanna Go Get Some Abalone" on Cultwo Show, he was asked by the hosts and listeners to call out lottery numbers. 2 days after the radio broadcast ended, 4 out of 7 numbers called out by Young Tak matched the winning lottery ones. As a result, thousands of his fans won 4th and 3rd place (varying from ₩50,000 to ₩1,300,000), their total winnings estimated from social media posts alone exceeded tens of millions of KRW, and many people believed that the song brought them good luck. "Wanna Go Get Some Abalone" won first place on The Trot Show on 21 March 2022.

On 14 February 2022, the conservative People Power Party chose Young Tak's "Jjiniya"/"Pitiful" (찐이야) to be their campaign song for the 2022 South Korean presidential election. On 9 March 2022, candidate Yoon Suk-yeol of the conservative People Power Party won the presidential election. On 31 March 2022, Young Tak won "Male Singer of the Year Award" at the 28th Korea Entertainment and Arts Awards. On 31 May 2022, Young Tak's agency released a photo of his first full album MMM through their official SNS channel. On 21 June 2022, it was announced that Young Tak's first solo concert 'Tak Show' would be held in 8 cities nationwide, starting at the Olympic Gymnastics Arena (KSPO DOME) in Seoul for 3 days from 29 to 31 July. On 4 July 2022, Young Tak's first full album MMM was released, which contains 12 songs of different genres such as rock, dance, pop, R&B, jazz, trot, ballad and more. He participated in the production of 9 out of 12 songs. On 17 July 2022, a special clip of "Bye Gimnyeong" (안녕김녕) - a jazz song which is also the closing track of the album - was released on his official Youtube channel. On 8 August 2022, Young Tak won "Angel N STAR Award" at 2022 The Fact Music Awards. On 21 October, Young Tak became the first Hidden Singer contestant ever to return as an original singer in the show's history. He also won against all of his impersonators in the episode. On 20 November, the 5 impersonators released single "Wings" (날개), an alternative rock song which was composed by Young Tak as a gift for them.

On 30 October 2022, the Tak Show – Andong concert was canceled due to the aftermath of the Seoul Halloween crowd crush. On 20 November 2022, Young Tak completed his first solo concert. 'Tak Show' accumulated a total of 90,000 attendees, and returned to Seoul with a three-day encore concert due to fan requests. On 21 November 2022, Young Tak had a special appearance in Behind Every Star as a rookie star who has gained popularity. On 30 November 2022, Young Tak won Grand Prize "Singer of the Year" at the 30th Korea Culture and Entertainment Awards for "Jjiniya" (찐이야).

On 15 December 2022, Young Tak released a re-arrangement of the song "Goat Gamida" (곶감이다), which he performed together with Ji Kwang-min at the EBS 'K-Story Pop Contest' back in 2014. The song's lyrics wittily tell the story of the Korean folklore 'The Tiger and the Dried Persimmon', and will be actively used in children's educational content.

=== 2023: Acting debut and Form ===
Young Tak first started acting back in high school, performing in his classmate director Kwon Oh-kwang (권오광)'s first short film With Burning Thirst (타는 목마름으로) in 2000 about the Gwangju Uprising, based on a poem of the same name by poet Kim Ji-ha. He made his official debut as an actor in the drama Strong Girl Nam-soon in 2023. Young Tak's acting debut was seen as successful and was praised by Korean press with phrases like "clearly revealing his hidden acting instincts", "The fact that this is his first acting challenge is overshadowed by the fact that he plays the role of a detective and shows a stable performance on screen. This increases the possibility of continuing to work as an actor in the future". Meanwhile, reporter Woo Da-bin of Hankook Ilbo described him as an "all-round player", a "scene stealer" who "does not just joke around and overreact. [..] Rather, he made us forget about his real job as he naturally immersed himself in the story."

On 19 January 2023, Young Tak won "Trot Award" at the 32nd Seoul Music Awards. On 11 February 2023, he won "Artist Of The Year" (Bonsang) at 30th Hanteo Music Awards.

On 2 March 2023, Young Tak joined the lineup of SBS's Golf Battle: Birdie Buddies season 5.

On 23 March 2023, Young Tak announced the termination of his exclusive contract with his agency Milagro Entertainment after 7 years.

On 26 April 2023, Young Tak confirmed his appearance as a fixed panel in SBS's Strong Heart League/Thumbnail Battle: The Strongest Hearts, a reboot of Strong Heart.

On 22 May 2023, Young Tak released the digital R&B single "On Your Side" (니편이야) without any agency. On 31 May 2023, he received honorary citizenship certificates at the 52nd Jeollanam-do Wando County People's Day ceremony.

On 28 June 2023, Young Tak's musical documentary 2022 Youngtak Concert: The Movie was domestically released exclusively at CGV. The film sold more than 32,000 tickets in the first week of its release. After 4 weeks of screening, 2022 Youngtak Concert: The Movie attracted a total of 42,384 spectators in Korea.

On 3 July 2023, Young Tak announced the release of his second full album Form (폼) through his self-made agency 'TakStudio' (탁스튜디오). On 1 August 2023, album Form was released with 10 songs of various genres, from the nu-disco title track "Form" (폼미쳤다) to ballad, R&B, rock, trot, folk. Young Tak participated in writing, composing, arranging and producing of all 10 songs.

From 25 to 27 August 2023, Young Tak kicked off his second national tour 'Tak Show 2: Tak's World' in Olympic Gymnastic Arena (KSPO DOME) in Seoul. The solo concerts were held in Daegu (16–17 September 2023), Busan (23–24 September 2023), Jeonju (14–15 October 2023), Incheon (28–29 October 2023), Andong (11–12 November 2023), and Daejeon (9–10 December 2023). He ended his national tour with 2 encore concerts in Seoul (17-18 February 2024).

On 24 September, the OST Part 2 of Live Your Own Life called "Go Your Own Way" (각자도생), which Young Tak not only sang, but also participated in writing lyrics, composing, and producing, was released.

On 15 December 2023, Young Tak won Grand Prize for 'Popular Culture' category at 2023 Nation Brand Awards. On 31 December 2023, his song "Go Your Own Way" (각자도생) won 'Best Original Soundtrack' at 2023 APAN Star Awards.

On 18 February 2024, Young Tak signed an exclusive contract with agency ABYSS Company (어비스컴퍼니).

On 27 March 2024, he won 3 awards at the 2024 Universal Superstar Awards.

On 28 March 2024, Young Tak was appointed as KORAIL Public relations ambassador. On 31 May 2024, he was appointed as Mongolian Tourism Promotion ambassador. On 15 July 2024, Korean Sport & Olympic Committee appointed him as public relations ambassador.

== Philanthropy ==
On 9 March 2022, Young Tak donated ₩100 million to the Korean Red Cross to help the victims of the massive forest fire that started in Uljin, North Gyeongsang, and has spread to Samcheok, Gangwon.

On 20 June 2022, Youngtak donated 500,000 won in May to the Korea Pediatric Cancer Foundation to help children with cancer and leukemia. He donates to them monthly and reached a cumulative donation amount of 8.36 million won as of May 2023.

On 19 July 2023, Youngtak donated ₩100 million to the Korean Red Cross to help support disaster relief activities in flood-affected areas in his hometown North Gyeongsang Province.

== Discography ==
=== Studio albums ===
List of studio albums, with selected details, chart positions and sales
Title	Details	Peak chart positions	Sales	Certifications
Title	Details	KOR	Sales	Certifications
MMM	Released: 4 July 2022; Label: Milagro Entertainment; Formats: CD, digital download	3	KOR: 535,310	
Form	Released: 1 August 2023; Label: TakStudio; Formats: CD, digital download	2	KOR: 630,148	KMCA: 2× Platinum
Gogo	Released: 14 September 2026; Label: Abyss Company; Formats: CD, digital download	1	KOR: 295,713	

=== Extended plays ===
List of extended plays, showing selected details, selected chart positions, sales figures, and certifications
Title	Details	Peak chart positions	Sales	Certifications
Title	Details	KOR	Sales	Certifications
SuperSuper	Released: 3 September 2024; Label: Abyss Company; Formats: CD, digital download	2	KOR: 542,228	KMCA: 2× Platinum

=== Singles and charted songs ===
Title	Year	Peak chart positions	Album
Title	Year	KOR	Album
"I Love You" (사랑한다)	2007	—	Non-album singles
"Miniseries" (미니시리즈)	2007	—	Non-album singles
"Nuna You're Perfect" (누나가 딱이야)	2016	—	Non-album singles
"We Are So Bad" (우리 정말 나쁘다)	2016	—	Non-album singles
"Cherry Blossom Love" (사랑의 벚꽃놀이)	2016	—	Non-album singles
"Why Are You Coming Out From There" (니가 왜 거기서 나와)	2018	62	Non-album singles
"Jjiniya"/"Pitiful" (찐이야)	2020	29	Music Source of Mr. Trot Final Best
"Comforter" (이불)	2021	83	Non-album singles
"Wanna Go Get Some Abalone" (전복 먹으러 갈래)	2022	98	Non-album singles
"The Wall" (담)	2022	—	MMM
"Chatter" (재잘대)	2022	—	MMM
"Spaceship" (우주선)	2022	—	MMM
"MMM" (신사답게)	2022	95	MMM
"Second Chance"	2022	—	MMM
"Be the Moon" (달이되어)	2022	—	MMM
"What Happened?" (머선129)	2022	127	MMM
"Take It Slow" (찬찬히)	2022	—	MMM
"Brown Umbrella" (갈색우산)	2022	139	MMM
"My Wife" (아내)	2022	—	MMM
"Hallyang-ga" (한량가)	2022	134	MMM
"Bye Gimnyeong" (안녕김녕)	2022	—	MMM
"On Your Side" (니편이야)	2023	42	Form
"Lorelei" (로렐라이)	2023	—	Form
"Tok Tok Tok" (톡톡톡)	2023	—	Form
"Form" (폼미쳤다)	2023	50	Form
"Up" (올려)	2023	—	Form
"Beautiful Goodbye" (이별해예쁘게)	2023	—	Form
"What Did You Say?" (우길걸우겨)	2023	123	Form
"Price" (값)	2023	88	Form
"Back Around" (돌아가네)	2023	—	Form
"Pull It Now" (풀리나)	2023	—	Form
"SuperSuper" (슈퍼슈퍼)	2024	66	SuperSuper
"Sarang OK" (사랑옥 (思郞屋))	2024	90	SuperSuper
"Autumntime" (가을이 오려나)	2024	199	SuperSuper
"Juicy Go" (시고) (with Kim Yonja)	2025	71	Non-album single
"Gogo" (꺾어)	2026	99	Gogo

=== Collaborations ===
Title	Year
"Same Old Words" (똑같은 말)	2014
"We Will Get There" (너도 그렇게 걸어줘)	2015
"The Three Views" (세 개의 시선)	2020
"Wings" (날개)	2022
"Goat Gamida" (곶감이다)	2022

=== Soundtrack appearances ===
Title	Year	Album
"Crying For The One" (Love Theme)	2005	Marrying the Mafia II OST
"I Can't Breathe" (Love Theme)	2005	Marrying the Mafia II OST
"Cafe Water Fog Blues" (물안개 블루스)	2020	Diary of a Prosecutor OST Part 1
"Kkondae Latte" (꼰대라떼)	2020	Kkondae Intern OST Part 1
"Okay" (오케이)	2021	Revolutionary Sisters OST Part 7
"Go Your Own Way" (각자도생)	2023	Live Your Own Life OST Part 2

=== Cartoon soundtrack appearances ===
Name	Song(s)	Note	Source(s)
A Simple Thinking About Blood Type	"여는노래"	Opening Song	
Bunsen Is A Beast (Korean dubbed version)	"Bunsen Is a Beast" Theme Song	Episode Opening Credits	
Hi! Bonobono (Korean dubbed version)	"보노보노하네"	Ending Theme	
Pokémon the Series: Sun & Moon (Korean dubbed version)	"Let's Go!"	Ending Theme 01	
Robot Trains	"변신기차 로봇트레인!"	Ending Theme of season 2	
SpongeBob SquarePants (Korean dubbed version)	"엄지송" (Original: Thumbs Song)	Song from episode "Two Thumbs Down"	
The Loud House (Korean dubbed version)	Opening Theme Song and End Credits	All episodes	
Yu-Gi-Oh! Duel Monsters Season 4 (Korean dubbed version)	"흘러넘치는 감정이 멈추지 않아" (Original: あふれる感情がとまらない)	Ending Theme from episode 132 to 189	

=== Production credits ===
All song credits are adapted from the Korea Music Copyright Association (KOMCA)'s database. Young Tak often works on music with his friend Ji Kwang-min. He was named as the Songwriter of the Year at Melon Music Awards in 2020.

Title	Album	Singer	Release date	Lyrics/ Co-Lyrics	Composition/ Co-Composition	Co-Arrangement
Please Don't Go (가지말라고)	Please Don't Go (가지말라고)	L CLASS (엘클래스)	28 December 2009	Yes	Yes	No
A Fool's Love Story (바보가하는사랑이야기)	Please Don't Go (가지말라고)	L CLASS (엘클래스)	28 December 2009	No	Yes	No
Same Old Words (똑같은 말)	Non-album single	Kim Jin-ho, Park Jun-young, GREG, Park Young-tak, Park G (김진호.박준영.GREG.제청.박영탁.박지)	28 January 2014	Yes	Yes	No
Are You Really Crazy (진짜미친거아니야)	Non-album single	Jo Hyun-min (조현민)	5 December 2014	Yes	Yes	No
I Don't Wanna Sleep With You (너와자고싶지않아)	Private or Public	Park G (박지)	27 April 2016	No	Yes	No
It's Winter (겨울이야)	Non-album single	Park Min-gyu (박민규)	19 November 2017	Yes	Yes	Yes
Why Are You Coming Out From There (니가왜거기서나와)	Why Are You Coming Out From There (니가왜거기서나와)	Young Tak (영탁)	28 October 2018	Yes	Yes	Yes
You Have Changed (요즘너달라)	Non-album single	S#aFLA (Sharp & Flat (샤플라) / ShaFLA)	18 March 2019	Yes	No	No
I Live Alone (나혼자산다)	Non-album single	Yoon Hee (윤희)	9 September 2019	Yes	Yes	Yes
In Bed (침대에서)	Non-album single	AUBE (오브)	10 October 2019	Yes	Yes	Yes
Hometown Day (고향가는날)	Non-album single	Han Lee-jae (한이재)	31 December 2019	Yes	Yes	Yes
Champion (챔피언)	First Step With The Champ (챔프와 첫걸음)	Lee Dae-won (이대원)	14 April 2020	Yes	Yes	Yes
Hit It Off (짝짝꿍짝)	Non-album single	Jeong Dong-won (정동원)	2 June 2020	Yes	Yes	Yes
Read and Ignored (읽씹안읽씹)	Non-album single	Jang Minho (장민호)	8 June 2020	Yes	Yes	Yes
Thirsty Now (목말라)	Non-album single	Y&W (영앤와일드)	26 September 2020	Yes	Yes	Yes
Love Cowboy (사랑의카우보이)	Non-album single	Ko Jae-geun (고재근)	21 October 2020	Yes	Yes	Yes
Because Of Money (돈때문이야)	Non-album single	Sungwon-ee (성원이)	29 October 2020	Yes	Yes	Yes
Knock Knock Knock (누구없나요)	Non-album single	Han Lee-jae (한이재)	26 November 2020	Yes	Yes	Yes
Why Are You Coming Out From There (니가왜거기서나와) (Remix)	Lotto Singer Episode 12 (로또싱어 12화)	Kim Myung-hoon (Ulala Session) 김명훈 (울랄라세션)	12 December 2020	Yes	Yes	No
Comforter (이불)	Non-album single	Young Tak (영탁)	10 February 2021	Yes	Yes	Yes
Magnifying Glass (돋보기)	Tomorrow Is Miss Trot 2 Final: Composer Mission	Byul Sa-rang (별사랑)	26 February 2021	Yes	Yes	Yes
Zero Sense (눈치제로)	Non-album single	Hee Siblings (Kim Hee-jae, Hong Hyun-hee, Kim Na-hee) 희남매 (김희재,홍현희,김나희)	5 April 2021	Yes	Yes	Yes
Follow Me (따라따라와)	Non-album single	Kim Hee-jae (김희재)	14 April 2021	Yes	Yes	Yes
Okay (오케이)	Revolutionary Sisters Original Soundtrack Part 7	Young Tak (영탁)	11 July 2021	Yes	Yes	No
Hoxy (혹시)	Non-album single	Choi Dae-sung (최대성)	11 August 2021	Yes	Yes	Yes
Get Set Yo (계세요)	Happy Virus (해피 바이러스)	MJ (엠제이)	3 November 2021	Yes	Yes	Yes
Wanna Go Get Some Abalone (전복 먹으러 갈래)	Non-album single	Young Tak (영탁)	10 February 2022	Yes	Yes	Yes
Shall We? (살까요)	Non-album single	Na Tae-joo (나태주)	28 February 2022	Yes	Yes	Yes
The Wall (담)	MMM	Young Tak (영탁)	4 July 2022	Yes	Yes	Yes
Chatter (재잘대)	MMM	Young Tak (영탁)	4 July 2022	Yes	Yes	Yes
Spaceship (우주선)	MMM	Young Tak (영탁)	4 July 2022	Yes	Yes	Yes
MMM (신사답게)	MMM	Young Tak (영탁)	4 July 2022	Yes	Yes	Yes
Second Chance	MMM	Young Tak (영탁)	4 July 2022	Yes	Yes	Yes
Be The Moon (달이되어)	MMM	Young Tak (영탁)	4 July 2022	Yes	Yes	Yes
What Happened? (머선129)	MMM	Young Tak (영탁)	4 July 2022	Yes	No	No
Take It Slow (찬찬히)	MMM	Young Tak (영탁)	4 July 2022	Yes	Yes	Yes
Bye Gimnyeong (안녕김녕)	MMM	Young Tak (영탁)	4 July 2022	Yes	Yes	Yes
DUDUNGSIL (두둥실)	Non-album single	So Yoon (소윤)	22 October 2022	Yes	Yes	No
Wings (날개)	Non-album single	Kim Heeseok, Oh Hyebin, Kang Daewoong, Song Geunan, Ha Donggeun, Young Tak (김희석, 오혜빈, 강대웅, 송근안, 하동근, 영탁)	20 November 2022	Yes	Yes	Yes
GOAT GAMIDA (곶감이다)	Non-album single	Young Tak, Ji Kwangmin (영탁, 지광민)	15 December 2022	No	No	Yes
On Your Side (니편이야)	Non-album single	Young Tak (영탁)	22 May 2023	Yes	Yes	Yes
Casablanca (카사블랑카)	Non-album single	Cha Soo-bin (차수빈)	9 June 2023	Yes	Yes	Yes
Love's Macchiato (사랑은마끼아또)	Non-album single	Two Sisters (두자매)	19 June 2023	Yes	Yes	Yes
Lorelei (로렐라이)	FORM	Young Tak (영탁)	1 August 2023	Yes	Yes	Yes
Tok Tok Tok (톡톡톡)	FORM	Young Tak (영탁)	1 August 2023	Yes	Yes	Yes
Form (폼 미쳤다)	FORM	Young Tak (영탁)	1 August 2023	Yes	Yes	Yes
Up (올려)	FORM	Young Tak (영탁)	1 August 2023	Yes	Yes	Yes
Beautiful Goodbye (이별해, 예쁘게)	FORM	Young Tak (영탁)	1 August 2023	Yes	Yes	Yes
What Did You Say? (우길걸우겨)	FORM	Young Tak (영탁)	1 August 2023	Yes	Yes	Yes
Price (값)	FORM	Young Tak (영탁)	1 August 2023	Yes	Yes	Yes
Back Around (돌아가네)	FORM	Young Tak (영탁)	1 August 2023	Yes	Yes	Yes
Pull It Now (풀리나)	FORM	Young Tak (영탁)	1 August 2023	Yes	Yes	Yes
Go Your Own Way (각자도생)	Live Your Own Life Original Soundtrack Part 2	Young Tak (영탁)	24 September 2023	Yes	Yes	Yes
Let Me Be Your Man (삼세판)	Non-album single	3MEN (삼총사)	4 December 2023	Yes	Yes	Yes
Sarang OK (사랑옥)	SuperSuper (슈퍼슈퍼)	Young Tak (영탁)	September 2024	Yes	Yes	Yes
SuperSuper (슈퍼슈퍼)	SuperSuper (슈퍼슈퍼)	Young Tak (영탁)	September 2024	Yes	Yes	Yes
Blue Ketchup (사막에빙어)	SuperSuper (슈퍼슈퍼)	Young Tak (영탁)	September 2024	Yes	Yes	Yes
Autumntime (가을이오려나)	SuperSuper (슈퍼슈퍼)	Young Tak (영탁)	September 2024	Yes	Yes	Yes
BRIGHTEN	SuperSuper (슈퍼슈퍼)	Young Tak (영탁)	September 2024	Yes	Yes	Yes

== Filmography ==
=== Television shows ===
Key
‡	Current programs
†	Works that have not yet been aired

Title	Year	Role	Note	Episodes	Ref.
The Golden Bell Challenge	2001	Contestant	as a student of Andong High School		
Star King	2009	Contestant	as Country Kids' Soul (지방 아이들 소울)		
Hidden Singer (South Korean TV series)	2013	Contestant	Wheesung Special	Season 2 - Episode 09	
Hidden Singer (South Korean TV series)	2020	Congratulatory Squad		Season 6 - Episode 01	
Hidden Singer (South Korean TV series)	2020	Panel	with Jang Min-ho	Season 6 - Episode 04	
Hidden Singer (South Korean TV series)	2020	Panel	with Jang Min-ho, Lee Chan-won, Kim Hee-jae	Season 6 - Episode 10	
Hidden Singer (South Korean TV series)	2022	Panel		Season 7 - Episode 01	
Hidden Singer (South Korean TV series)	2022	Original singer	Young Tak Special	Season 7 - Episode 10	
Mister Trot F4 Academy	2020 – 2021	Main Cast	with Mr Trot top 6	Episode 1–72	
Mr Trot	2020	Contestant	2nd place	Episode 1–12	
Taste of Mr. Trot	2020	Main cast	with Mr Trot top 7	Episode 1–2	
Romantic Call Centre	2020–2021	Main Cast	with Mr Trot Top 7	Episode 1–71	
My Little Old Boy	2020	Special Cast	with Jang Min-ho	Episode 190–194	
Omniscient Interfering View	2020	Himself	with Lee Chan-won (as Protangonist) and Kim Hee-jae	Episode 105–107	
Omniscient Interfering View	2023	Himself	Protangonist	Episode 266	
Taste of Wife	2020	Himself	with Jung Dong-won, Nam Seung-min	Episode 94, 97, 99, 125	
Immortal Songs: Singing the Legend	2020	Contestant	Song Hae Festival (with Mr Trot Top 6)	Episode 457–458	
Immortal Songs: Singing the Legend	2021	Special Host			
Immortal Songs: Singing the Legend	2022	Contestant	Korean Music History Special	Episode 553-554	
Immortal Songs: Singing the Legend	2022	Performer	2022 Mother's Day Special - The 3 Kings	Episode 555-556	
Immortal Songs: Singing the Legend	2023	Performer	120th anniversary of Korean immigration to the United States		
Miss Trot (season 2)	2020–2021	Judge Panel		Episode 1–3	
Miss Trot (season 2)	2020–2021	Composer	"Magnifying Glass" (돋보기); Production	Episode 12	
Begin Again Open Mic	2021	Performer	with HYNN		
Korea's Chicken Battle	2021	Regular Cast	Celebrity judge	Episode 1–12	
Buddy Into The Wild	2021	Cast	with Jang Min-ho, Lee Chan-won	Episode 54–55	
Buddy Into The Wild	2023	Studio panelist			
Buddy Into The Wild	2023	Cast	with Boom and Song Jin-woo	Episode 116	
Nowadays Men's Life Groom Class	2022	Cast	with Lee Seung-chul, Kim Chan-woo, Kim Jun-su, Mo Tae-bum, Park Tae-hwan	Episode 1-35	
Thank You Everyone, Song Hae	2022	Performer	Trot musical special	2022 Lunar New Year special	
Golf Battle: Birdie Buddies 5	2023	Cast Member	Season 5		
Where Is My Home	2023	Studio panelist		Episode 200-201	
Strong Heart League/ Thumbnail Battle: The Strongest Hearts	2023	Panel		Episode 1-12	

=== Television series ===
Year	Title	Role	Notes	Ref.
2020	Kkondae Intern	Cha Hyeong-seok	Cameo	
2020	Kingmaker: The Change of Destiny	Government official	Cameo	
2022	Behind Every Star	Himself	Cameo (episode 5)	
2023	Strong Girl Nam-soon	Oh Young-tak	Supporting Role	
2023	Live Your Own Life	Sales employee	Cameo (episode 28)	

=== Film appearances ===
Title	Year	Role	Note(s)
Mr. Trot: The Movie	2020	Himself	Musical documentary film
2022 Youngtak Concert: The Movie	2023	Himself	Musical documentary film

=== Radio appearances ===
Year	Name	Station	Role
2019–2020	Choi Il-gu's Hurricane Radio 《최일구의 허리케인 라디오》	TBS FM	Main host

== Ambassadorship ==
- Wando Abalone ambassador (2022)
- Korail Public Relations ambassador (2024)
- Mongolia's Tourism Promotion ambassador (2024)
- Korean Sport & Olympic Committee Public Relations ambassador (2024)

== Accolades ==
=== Awards and nominations ===
Name of the award ceremony, year presented, category, nominee of the award, and the result of the nomination
Award ceremony	Year	Category	Nominee / Work	Result	Ref.
APAN Star Awards	2023	Best Original Soundtrack	"Go Your Own Way" (각자도생)	Won	
Asia Artist Awards	2021	Male Solo Singer Popularity Award	Young Tak	Nominated	
Asia Artist Awards	2026	Popularity Award – Solo (Male)	Young Tak	Pending	
Asia Star Entertainer Awards	2024	The Best Trot	Young Tak	Won	
Brand Customer Loyalty Grand Prize	2020	Male Trot Singer Category Grand Prize	Young Tak	Won	
The Fact Music Awards	2022	Angel N STAR Award	Young Tak	Won	
The Fact Music Awards	2023	Best Fall Music	"Form" (폼미쳤다)	Nominated	
The Fact Music Awards	2023	Fan N STAR Choice Solo	Young Tak	Nominated	
The Fact Music Awards	2023	TMA Idolplus Popularity	Young Tak	Nominated	
Gaon Chart Music Awards	2021	Discovery of the Year 2020	"Why Are You Coming Out From There" (니가 왜 거기서 나와)	Won	
Golden Disc Awards	2023	Best Album	"MMM"	Nominated	
Hanteo Music Awards	2022	Artist of the Year (Main Prize)	Young Tak	Won	
Hanteo Music Awards	2022	Special Award (Trot)	Young Tak	Nominated	
KCA Consumer Day Awards	2020	Best Celebrity from a Variety Show	"Mr. Trot"	Won	
Korea Image Awards	2021	Stepping Stone Award	with Top 6 Mr. Trot	Won	
Korea Entertainment and Arts Awards	2022	Male Singer of the Year Award	Young Tak	Won	
Korea Culture And Entertainment Awards	2022	Singer of the Year (Grand Prize)	Young Tak	Won	
Melon Music Awards	2020	Best Trot Song	"Jjiniya" (찐이야)	Nominated	
Melon Music Awards	2020	Hot Trend Award	with Top 6 Mr. Trot	Won	
Melon Music Awards	2020	Best Songwriter Award	Young Tak	Won	
MTN Broadcast Advertising Festival	2020	Newcomer CF Star Award	Young Tak	Won	
Tomorrow is Mr. Trot	2020	2nd Place Out of 17,000 Applicants	"Jjiniya" (찐이야)	Runner-up	
Nation Brand Awards	2023	Popular Culture (Grand Prize)	Young Tak	Won	
Seoul International Drama Awards	2021	Excellent Korean Drama OST	"Kkondae Latte" (꼰대라떼)	Nominated	
Seoul International Drama Awards	2021	Excellent Korean Drama OST	"Okay" (오케이)	Won	
Seoul Music Awards	2022	Trot Award	"Comforter" (이불)	Nominated	
Seoul Music Awards	2023	Trot Award	"MMM" (신사답게)	Won	
Seoul Music Awards	2024	Trot Award	"Form" (폼미쳤다)	Won	
Seoul Music Awards	2024	The Best Award	Young Tan	Nominated	
Seoul Music Awards	2024	Male Singer Solo Category	Young Tan	Nominated	
Seoul Music Awards	2024	Hallyu Award	Young Tan	Nominated	
Seoul Music Awards	2024	Bonsang	"Form" (폼미쳤다)	Won	
Star King	2009	Excellence Prize	as Country Kids' Soul (지방아이들소울로)	Won	
Trot Awards	2020	Rising Star Award	Selected by 108 PDs from all broadcast stations	Won	
Universal Superstar Awards	2024	Universal Singer-Songwriter Icon	Young Tak	Won	
Universal Superstar Awards	2024	Universal Tour Icon	Young Tak	Won	
Universal Superstar Awards	2024	Universal Hot Solo	Young Tak	Won	
Yeongnam Song Festival	2004	Excellence Prize	"The Flight" (비상)	Won	

=== Listicles ===
Name of publisher, year listed, name of listicle, and placement
Publisher	Year	Listicle	Placement	Ref.
Forbes	2021	Korea Power Celebrity 40	8th	
Forbes	2022	Korea Power Celebrity 40	25th	
Forbes	2023	Korea Power Celebrity 40	10th	
Forbes	2025	Korea Power Celebrity 40	34th	
