= Romantic Call Centre =

South Korean television show

- Romantic Call Centre poster
- Also known as: We Will Sing Your Requested Songs — Romantic Call Centre
- Hangul: 신청곡을 불러드립니다 — 사랑의 콜센타
- RR: Sincheonggogeul bulleo deurimnida — sarangui kolsenta
- MR: Sinch'ŏnggogŭl pullŏ tŭrimnida — sarangŭi k'olsent'a
- Presented by: Kim Sung-joo, Boom
- Country of origin: South Korea
- Original language: Korean
- No. of seasons: 2
- No. of episodes: 73

Production
- Production location: South Korea
- Running time: 150 minutes
- Production company: Golden Eight Media

Original release
- Network: TV Chosun
- Release: April 2, 2020 – September 30, 2021

Romantic Call Centre (Korean: 사랑의 콜센타), or the full name We Will Sing Your Requested Songs — Romantic Call Centre (신청곡을 불러드립니다 — 사랑의 콜센타) is a South Korean reality television show. This is the follow-up show of Mr Trot (including its epilogue version The Taste of Mr Trot), casting the top 7 of the now-defunct program.

The program was planned as a purpose of fan meeting, which was originally for Mr Trot but never occurred due to the coronavirus pandemic. Though it was initially organised for 3 episodes, it was remade as a regular on account of high popularity.

== Cast ==
=== Hosts ===
- Kim Sung-joo (Seasons 1–2)
- Boom (Seasons 1–2)

=== Main cast ===
==== Current ====
- Lim Young-woong (Seasons 1–2)
- Young Tak (Seasons 1–2)
- Lee Chan-won (Seasons 1–2)
- Jung Dong-won (Seasons 1–2)
- Jang Min-ho (Seasons 1–2)
- Kim Hee-jae (Seasons 1–2)

==== Former ====
- Kim Ho-joong (Season 1, episodes 1–16)

=== Guests ===
Episode #	Guest(s)
Season 1
5	Hong Jin-young
6	Ryu Ji-kwang, Kang Tae-kwan, Na Tae-joo, Shin In-seon, Kim Soo-chan, Hwang Yoon-sung, Kim Kyung-min, Nam Seung-min
7	Jin Sung
9	Lyn
10	Park Sang-cheol
13	Kang Jin
14–15	Park Goo-yoon, Shin Yoo, Choi Hyun-sang, Shin Sung, So Yoo-chan, Park Seo-jin, Jang Song-ho
16	Roh Ji-hoon, Kim Joong-yeon
17	Jo Hang-jo
18–19	Baek Ji-young, Lyn, Lee Hae-ri (Davichi), Solji (EXID), U Sung-eun, Ben
20	Oh Seung-geun, Kang Jin, Kim Beom-ryong, Jo Hang-jo, Jin Si-mon, Park Goo-yoon
21–22	Shin Sung, Kim Soo-chan
23	Seo Ji-oh, Geum Jan-di, Park Ki-woong, Jung Myung-gyu, (Note: He was a former contestant of SBS's Fantastic Duo season 1 (episodes 11–12) and the last duet with Hwanhee but did not win this episodes.) Hwang Yoon-sung, Im Do-hyung
24	Hong Ji-min, Cha Ji-yeon, Kang Hong-seok, Kim Junsu, Shin In-seon, Luna (f(x))
26	Kim Young-ok, Baek Il-seob, Sunwoo Yong-nyeo, Im Hyun-sik, Noh Joo-hyun, Hye Eun-yi
27	Choi Jin-hee, Jung Soo-ra, Kim Yong-im, Seo Ji-oh, Geum Jan-di, Jo Jeong-min
28	Jo Kwan-woo, Im Tae-kyung, Kim Tae-woo (g.o.d), Tei, Na Yoon-kwon, Shin Yong-jae
29–30	Jo Hang-jo, Jin Sung, Kim Yong-im, Chu Ga-yeoul, Yoo Ji-na, Jin Si-mon, Seo Ji-oh, Sook Haeng, Park Goo-yoon, Park Seo-jin
31	Choi Sung-soo, Lee Sang-woo, Jung Soo-ra, Park Mi-kyung, Park Nam-jung, Kim Seung-jin
32	Lee Soo-young, Lee Ye-joon, Solji (EXID), Crush, Ok Jin-wook, Nam Seung-min
Season 2
33	Kang Tae-kwan, Lee Dae-won, Hwang Yoon-sung, Kim Kyung-min
34	Hyun Jin-young, Johan Kim (Solid), Seomoon Tak, Chun Myung-hoon, Lee Ji-hoon, Shin Ji (Koyote)
35	Kwon In-ha, Jang Hye-jin, UV, BtoB (Seo Eun-kwang, Lee Chang-sub), Hyojung (Oh My Girl), Hyojin (ONF)
36	Roh Ji-hoon, Lee Chan-sung, Yang Ji-won, Han Yi-jae, Ok Jin-wook, Jang Young-woo
37	Kwon In-ha, Kim Jong-seo, Bobby Kim, Im Tae-kyung, Park Wan-kyu, KCM
38	Oh Eun-young, Yang Jae-woong, Jung Seung-je, Kim Chang-ok, Choi Hyun-woo, Park Ji-woo
39	Jin Mi-ryung, Lee Eun-ha, Moon Hee-ok, Kim Hye-yeon, Wink, Yoon Soo-hyun
40	Insooni, Bada, Jung-in, Ali, Ailee, Hyolyn
41	Norazo, Seven, Raina (After School), Jo Kwon (2AM), Sandeul (B1A4), Seunghee (Oh My Girl)
43	Kim Eung-soo, Kang Eun-tak, Min Woo-hyuk, Koo Hye-sun, Park Jin-joo, Kal So-won
44	Im Joo-ri, Joo Byung-seon, Lee Beom-hak, Kim Min-kyo, Woo Yeon-yi, Yang Hye-seung
45	Hong Ja, Cheetah, Car, the Garden, Ahn Ye-eun, Baek A-yeon, Byun Hyun-min
46–47	Mr Trot's former contestants (Kim Joong-yeon, Nam Seung-min); Mr Trot Rainbow (Ryu Ji-kwang, Kang Tae-kwan, Shin In-seon, Kim Soo-chan, Hwang Yoon-sung, Kim Kyung-min); Miss Trot 2 Top 7 (Eun Ga-eun, Yang Ji-eun, Byeol Sa-rang, Kim Eui-young, Hong Ji-yoon, Kim Da-hyun, Kim Tae-yeon); Miss Trot 2 Rainbow (Kim Yeon-ji, Yoon Tae-hwa, Kim Hye-yeon, Huh Chan-mi, Ryu Won-jeong, Hwang Woo-rim, Maria)
48	Eun Ga-eun, Yang Ji-eun, Kim Hye-yeon, Byeol Sa-rang, Kim Eui-young, Hong Ji-yoon
49	Hwang Chi-yeul, Yoon Hyung-ryul, Lee Seok-hoon (SG Wannabe), Na Yoon-kwon, Shin Sung, Jeong Se-woon
50	Seo Ji-oh, Kim Da-hyun
51	Jung Dong-ha, Tei, Min Woo-hyuk, Lee Hyun (8Eight/Homme), Lee Jang-woo, Kim Junsu
52	Kim Soo-hee, Ha Choon-hwa, Kim Sang-bae, Park Hyun-bin
53	Miss Trot 2's former contestants (Park Joo-hee, Kim Da-na, Ha Yi-ryang, Joo Mi, Kim Myung-seon, So Yoo-mi)
54	Maasung, Kim Seon-joon, Choi Jeong-hoon, Jung Da-han, Moah, Kang Seok
55	Tae Jin-ah, Shin In-seon, Yang Ji-eun, Ren (NU'EST)
56	Park Hae-mi, Shin Youngsook, Bae Da-hae, Jung Seon-ah, Jung Yoo-ji, Son Seung-yeon
57	Kim Wan-sun, Chae Yeon, Jo Jeong-min, Stephanie
58	Park Sang-min, Kim Jung-min, Hong Kyung-min, Kim Hyun-jung, Go Yoo-jin (Flower), Lee Hyuk
60	Moon Hee-kyung, Lee Hyun-woo, Kim Beop-rae, Ha Jae-sook, Kan Mi-youn, Kim Seul-gi
61	Joo Byung-seon, Lee Ji-hoon, Jung Dong-ha, Park Goo-yoon, Jung Yoo-ji, Shin In-seon
62	Sung Si-kyung, Gummy
63	Yoo Hyun-sang, Jo Jang-hyuk, Oh Jong-hyuk (Click-B), Outsider, Ahn Se-ha, Sandeul (B1A4)
64	Jungyup (Brown Eyed Soul), Lee Ki-chan, Seo Ji-seok, Im Kang-sung, Kim Jae-joong, Ha Sung-woon
65	Shin Shin-ae, Wax, Hyun Young, Pearl, JeA (Brown Eyed Girls), Kang Tae-kwan, Queen Wa$abii
66	Won Mi-yeon, Lisa, Lim Jeong-hee, Kim Young-ji, Big Mama (Lee Young-hyun, Park Min-hye)
67	Lee Chi-hyun, Kim Beom-ryong, Kim Jung-min, Bada Kim, Kim Tae-hyun (DickPunks), Lee Seung-yoon
68	Jung Young-joo, Sonya, Kim Ho-young, Son Jun-ho, Navi
69	Lee Yong, Seol Woon-do, Jung Soo-ra, Park Wan-kyu, Ali, Ailee
70	Park Nam-jung, Kim Hyung-joong, Jung Jae-wook, Kim Jung-hyun, Jung Tae-woo, Kim Kyung-rok (V.O.S)
71	Kim Ji-hyun, Kwak Seung-nam (Indigo), Narsha (Brown Eyed Girls), Seo In-young, Luna (f(x)), Jamie

== Episodes ==
=== Season 1 ===
==== Episode 1 ====
Turn	Region	Singer	Song	Marks	Remarks
1	Seoul	Lim Young-woong	I Hate You	84/100	
2	Gyeonggi	Kim Ho-joong	About Romance	95/100	
3	Ulsan	Kim Hee-jae	Later, Later	90/100	
4	Daejeon	Lee Chan-won	Love In Dream	93/100	
5	Incheon	Lim Young-woong	Teahouse of the Winter	100/100	A hotel coupon was given for the gift.
6	South Gyeongsang	Young Tak	Junior Is the Best	85/100	
7	Gangwon	Jung Dong-won	Net	86/100	
8	Gwangju	Kim Ho-joong	I Only Know Love	87/100	
9	Busan	Jang Min-ho	I Love You, Junior	96/100	
10	North Chungcheong (Note: Including Sejong City.)	Young Tak	A Cup of Makgeolli	98/100	
11	North Chungcheong	Lee Chan-won	Millennial Rock	92/100	
12	Jeju	Lim Young-woong	Woodcutter	97/100	
13	Daegu	Kim Hee-jae	Beautiful Country	98/100	

==== Episode 2 ====
Turn	Region	Singer	Song	Marks	Remarks
1	Busan	Kim Ho-joong	A Lady of Flowery Air	96/100	
2	Seoul	Lim Young-woong	Smile Becomes Young, Angry Becomes Old	99/100	
3	Seoul	Lee Chan-won	I Love You	91/100	
4	Gangwon	Young Tak	I'll Become Dust	93/100	
5	North Jeolla	Jung Dong-won	A Love Towards Green Grape	82/100	
6	North Chungcheong	Lee Chan-won & Kim Hee-jae	Love Letter	95/100	Duet
7	Daegu	Lee Chan-won	Day of Dawn	83/100	Requested by his high school teacher.
8	Ulsan	Jang Min-ho	The Moon Represents My Heart	100/100	
9	North Jeolla	Kim Ho-joong	First Marriage	100/100	
10	Daejeon	Jang Min-ho	Wish List	99/100	
11	Gyeonggi	Young Tak & Lim Young-woong	Champion	100/100	Duet

==== Episode 3 ====
Turn	Region	Singer	Song	Marks	Remarks
1	South Gyeongsang	Young Tak	Ripe Persimmon	89/100	
2	Incheon	Lim Young-woong	Despacito	94/100	
3	Seoul	Lee Chan-won	Finding Love, Finding Life	85/100	
4	Jeju	Jang Min-ho	Slow Train to Mokpo	82/100	
5	Gyeonggi	Kim Ho-joong	Wet Firewood	82/100	
6	Daegu	Jung Dong-won	12 Lines	87/100	
7	Daegu	Kim Hee-jae	Call for Me	94/100	
8	Daegu	Kim Hee-jae & Young Tak	Flower	94/100	Duet
9	North Gyeongsang	Lee Chan-won	Ball	99/100	Originally Lim, replaced to Lee as Lim did not know the song.
10	South Jeolla	Lim Young-woong	Magic Lily	95/100	
11	Seoul	Jung Dong-won	Bad Son Is Crying	92/100	
12	Nationwide	All	Highway in the Gale	100/100	

==== Episode 4 ====
Turn	Region	Singer	Song	Marks	Remarks
1	South Chungcheong	Kim Ho-joong	Mona Lisa	85/100	
2	Gwangju	Lee Chan-won	Nostalgic Serenade	96/100	
3	Gyeonggi	Young Tak	Wind, Wind, Wind	100/100	
4	Ulsan	Young Tak	You Are The Best	97/100	
5	North Gyeongsang	Lim Young-woong	Only Longing Grows	89/100	
6	Gyeonggi	Kim Ho-joong	I Used to Love You	100/100	
7	South Gyeongsang	Lee Chan-won	Nasty Fellow	98/100	
8	Gyeonggi	Kim Hee-jae / Jang Min-ho	To J / Round And Round	95/100 / 100/100	
9	North Gyeongsang	Lim Young-woong	A Man of Port	100/100	
10	Hong Kong	Jung Dong-won	Dam Da Di	82/100	
11	Daejeon	Kim Ho-joong, Young Tak & Jang Min-ho	The Story of Last Night	96/100	

==== Episode 5 ====
Turn	Region	Singer	Song	Marks	Remarks
1	Gyeonggi	Jung Dong-won	Partner	81/100	
2	South Jeolla	Kim Ho-joong	Dear Love	87/100	
3	Jeju	Young Tak	Dear Honey	95/100	
4	Daegu	Lee Chan-won	Romantic Rope	100/100	
5	Busan	Lim Young-woong & Hong Jin-young	Blue in You	81/100	Duet; Requested by Hong Jin-young
6	Gangwon	Kim Hee-jae	Affection	84/100	
7	Gangwon	Lim Young-woong	Romantic Maze	90/100	
8	South Jeolla	Jang Min-ho	Please Don't Change Your Mind	85/100	
9	Seoul	Young Tak & Hong Jin-young	Tonight	100/100	Duet
10	Incheon	Kim Ho-joong	Your Lamp	97/100	
11	N/A	All / Hong Jin-young	Mr. Right / My Brother	95/100 / 100/100	

== Ratings ==
In the tables below, the blue numbers represent the lowest ratings and the red numbers represent the highest ratings.

=== Season 1 ===
Ep.	Air Date	Nielsen Korea Ratings			
Ep.	Air Date	Nationwide		Seoul Capital Area	
Ep.	Air Date	Part 1	Part 2	Part 1	Part 2
1	April 2, 2020	19.964%	23.089%	18.502%	22.182%
2	April 9, 2020	17.985%	20.738%	15.419%	18.584%
3	April 16, 2020	17.675%	20.484%	16.278%	19.252%
4	April 23, 2020	19.370%	22.485%	16.100%	20.087%
5	April 30, 2020	17.668%	20.958%	15.630%	19.173%
6	May 7, 2020	19.012%	22.517%	16.570%	20.187%
7	May 14, 2020	18.510%	22.145%	16.173%	20.476%
8	May 21, 2020	18.456%	21.248%	16.039%	20.128%
9	May 28, 2020	17.072%	20.373%	15.185%	19.342%
10	June 4, 2020	19.681%	21.288%	18.093%	20.008%
11	June 11, 2020	19.221%	19.441%	17.700%	18.151%
12	June 18, 2020	15.583%	17.755%	17.700%	18.151%
13	June 25, 2020	18.148%	18.806%	16.269%	17.100%
14	July 2, 2020	18.988%	22.021%	16.611%	20.224%
15	July 9, 2020	19.276%	20.845%	17.084%	19.128%
16	July 16, 2020	18.362%	20.729%	15.513%	18.119%
17	July 23, 2020	17.541%	18.285%	15.819%	16.742%
18	July 30, 2020	17.187%	20.766%	15.720%	19.837%
19	August 6, 2020	17.324%	17.938%	15.661%	17.331%
20	August 13, 2020	17.565%	20.161%	16.234%	18.760%
21	August 20, 2020	16.950%	18.639%	16.060%	17.520%
22	August 27, 2020	16.428%	17.666%	14.849%	15.259%
23	September 3, 2020	17.086%	20.457%	15.985%	19.676%
24	September 10, 2020	16.692%	18.283%	16.017%	17.543%
25	September 17, 2020	15.657%	15.340%	14.164%	14.984%
26	September 24, 2020	16.131%	16.432%	15.528%	16.269%
27	October 8, 2020	15.542%	18.423%	14.761%	17.645%
28	October 15, 2020	14.879%	17.087%	13.639%	16.154%
29	October 22, 2020	16.876%	17.911%	15.671%	16.937%
30	October 29, 2020	14.962%	16.314%	13.582%	15.533%
31	November 5, 2020	14.938%	15.702%	14.244%	15.751%
32	November 12, 2020	15.026%	15.545%	14.028%	14.303%

=== Season 2 ===
#	Ep.	Air Date	Nielsen Korea Ratings			
#	Ep.	Air Date	Nationwide		Seoul Capital Area	
#	Ep.	Air Date	Part 1	Part 2	Part 1	Part 2
33	1	November 19, 2020	14.616%	15.461%	13.231%	14.608%
34	2	December 3, 2020	13.330%	12.054%	12.332%	12.216%
35	3	December 10, 2020	12.736%	13.778%	11.818%	13.800%
36	4	January 1, 2021	12.689%	14.953%	11.504%	14.510%
37	5	January 8, 2021	9.834%	14.228%	8.915%	13.630%
38	6	January 15, 2021	12.074%	13.415%	10.374%	13.290%
39	7	January 22, 2021	13.412%	16.482%	11.835%	14.518%
40	8	January 29, 2021	13.254%	14.144%	12.193%	13.791%
41	9	February 5, 2021	13.149%	13.911%	11.133%	12.537%
42	10	February 12, 2021	13.936%	12.097%	12.344%	10.756%
43	11	February 19, 2021	11.817%	14.113%	10.712%	13.133%
44	12	February 26, 2021	11.710%	12.075%	10.898%	11.670%
45	13	March 5, 2021	11.603%	12.061%	10.810%	11.783%
46	14	March 12, 2021	13.956%	15.798%	12.899%	14.586%
47	15	March 19, 2021	12.608%	14.180%	10.352%	12.589%
48	16	March 26, 2021	11.162%	11.225%	9.974%	10.602%
49	17	April 1, 2021	12.907%	11.846%	11.992%	11.996%
50	18	April 8, 2021	12.274%	11.733%	11.372%	10.456%
51	19	April 15, 2021	12.867%	13.157%	11.037%	11.982%
52	20	April 22, 2021	12.157%	12.057%	10.831%	11.107%
53	21	April 29, 2021	9.919%	12.772%	8.827%	11.597%
54	22	May 6, 2021	11.720%	10.958%	9.930%	10.126%
55	23	May 13, 2021	12.739%	12.006%	10.843%	10.684%
56	24	May 20, 2021	13.128%	13.108%	12.331%	12.308%
57	25	May 27, 2021	12.078%	11.315%	11.375%	10.532%
58	26	June 3, 2021	12.329%	11.284%	11.306%	10.581%
59	27	June 10, 2021	12.294%	11.492%	10.632%	10.074%
60	28	June 17, 2021	12.363%	12.483%	10.724%	11.487%
61	29	June 24, 2021	11.582%	10.973%	10.600%	10.026%
62	30	July 1, 2021	12.476%	10.445%	11.611%	9.355%
63	31	July 8, 2021	10.682%	9.310%	9.849%	8.816%
64	32	July 15, 2021	10.294%	7.816%	9.736%	7.698%
65	33	July 22, 2021	9.415%	8.598%	8.784%	8.151%
none	Special	July 29, 2021	6.618%	4.449%	5.929%	4.232%
none	Special	August 5, 2021	7.065%	4.974%	6.524%	4.751%
66	34	August 12, 2021	9.922%	7.390%	9.332%	7.405%
67	35	August 19, 2021	10.343%	8.783%	10.293%	9.122%
68	36	August 26, 2021	10.333%	9.910%	9.805%	9.061%
69	37	September 2, 2021	10.947%	9.713%	10.515%	9.333%
70	38	September 9, 2021	10.151%	8.029%	10.061%	8.047%
71	39	September 16, 2021	9.136%	9.262%	8.030%	8.493%
72	40	September 23, 2021	10.458%	8.580%	10.294%	8.105%
73	41	September 30, 2021	10.489%	9.878%	9.257%	9.451%
