= List of Hunter Street episodes =

Hunter Street is a comedy adventure television series created by Reint Schölvinck and Melle Runderkamp that aired on Nickelodeon from March 11, 2017 to February 23, 2018, and on TeenNick from July 29 to September 27, 2019. The series stars Stony Blyden, Mae Mae Renfrow, Kyra Smith, Thomas Jansen, and Daan Creyghton as a group of five foster children who must solve a mystery in order to find their missing foster parents. Wilson Radjou-Pujalte and Kate Bensdorp join the cast in the series' second season, and Eliyha Altena and Sarah Nauta join the cast in the series' third season.

== Series overview ==
Season	Episodes	Originally released		
Season	Episodes	First released	Last released	Network
1	20	March 11, 2017	April 7, 2017	Nickelodeon
2	20	January 29, 2018	February 23, 2018	Nickelodeon
3	30	July 29, 2019	September 27, 2019	TeenNick
4	20	April 19, 2021 (UK)	May 20, 2021 (UK)	Nickelodeon UK

== Episodes ==
=== Season 1 (2017) ===
No. overall	No. in season	Title	Directed by	Written by	Original release date	U.S. viewers (millions)
1	1	"The New Hunter"	Erwin van den Eshof	Reint Schölvinck and Melle Runderkamp	March 11, 2017 (Note: This episode was shown as a preview on March 11, 2017, and then as the official series premiere on March 13, 2017. The viewership data is 1.33 million viewers for the official premiere on March 13, 2017.)	1.82
2	2	"Saganash"	Erwin van den Eshof	Reint Schölvinck and Melle Runderkamp	March 13, 2017	1.24
3	3	"The Secret Room"	Erwin van den Eshof	Reint Schölvinck, Melle Runderkamp, Anne-Louise Verboon and Pauline Van Mantgem	March 14, 2017	1.34
4	4	"Principal"	Erwin van den Eshof	Reint Schölvinck, Melle Runderkamp, Anne-Louise Verboon, Pauline Van Mantgem and Pasja Van Dam	March 15, 2017	1.30
5	5	"Rinus"	Erwin van den Eshof	Anne-Louise Verboon, Pauline Van Mantgem and Pasja Van Dam	March 16, 2017	1.34
6	6	"The Key"	Hans Somers	Melle Runderkamp, Reint Schölvinck, Anne-Louise Verboon, Pauline Van Mantgem, Elle Van Rijn and Willem Bosch	March 20, 2017	1.12
7	7	"The Blue Diamond"	Hans Somers	Reint Schölvinck, Melle Runderkamp, Anne-Louise Verboon, Pauline Van Mantgem, Pasja Van Dam, Nienke Römer and Willem Bosch	March 21, 2017	1.33
8	8	"MGP"	Hans Somers	Reint Schölvinck, Melle Runderkamp, Anne-Louise Verboon, Pauline Van Mantgem, Pasja Van Dam and Wolter Muller	March 22, 2017	1.33
9	9	"Aunt Hedwig & Uncle Eugene"	Hans Somers	Reint Schölvinck, Melle Runderkamp, Anne-Louise Verboon, Pauline Van Mantgem, Pasja Van Dam, Nienke Römer and Willem Bosch	March 23, 2017	1.34
10	10	"Contact"	Hans Somers	Reint Schölvinck, Melle Runderkamp, Anne-Louise Verboon and Pauline Van Mantgem	March 24, 2017	1.05
11	11	"The Relatives"	Erwin van den Eshof	Reint Schölvinck, Melle Runderkamp, Pauline Van Mantgem and Wolter Muller	March 27, 2017	1.29
12	12	"The Red Diamond"	Erwin van den Eshof	Reint Schölvinck, Melle Runderkamp, Anne-Louise Verboon Pauline Van Mantgem and Willem Bosch	March 28, 2017	1.29
13	13	"Cassandra's Map"	Erwin van den Eshof	Reint Schölvinck, Melle Runderkamp, Anne-Louise Verboon and Pauline Van Mantgem	March 29, 2017	1.27
14	14	"Anika's Birthday"	Erwin van den Eshof	Reint Schölvinck, Melle Runderkamp, Pauline Van Mantgem and Judith Goudsmit	March 30, 2017	1.30
15	15	"The Maze"	Erwin van den Eshof	Reint Schölvinck, Melle Runderkamp and Pauline Van Mantgem	March 31, 2017	1.19
16	16	"Undercover"	Hans Somers	Reint Schölvinck, Melle Runderkamp, Pauline Van Mantgem and Willem Bosch	April 3, 2017	1.18
17	17	"Sophie"	Hans Somers	Reint Schölvinck, Melle Runderkamp, Pauline Van Mantgem and Willem Bosch	April 4, 2017	1.33
18	18	"Bruhl"	Hans Somers	Reint Schölvinck, Melle Runderkamp, Pauline Van Mantgem and Wolter Muller	April 5, 2017	1.50
19	19	"Almost Back"	Hans Somers	Reint Schölvinck, Melle Runderkamp, Pauline Van Mantgem and Wolter Muller	April 6, 2017	1.38
20	20	"The Deed"	Hans Somers	Reint Schölvinck, Melle Runderkamp, Pauline Van Mantgem, Wolter Muller and Willem Bosch	April 7, 2017	1.55

=== Season 2 (2018) ===
No. overall	No. in season	Title	Directed by	Written by	Original release date	U.S. viewers (millions)
21	1	"The Package"	Erwin van den Eshof	Reint Schölvinck and Melle Runderkamp	January 29, 2018	0.81
22	2	"The Arrest"	Erwin van den Eshof	Reint Schölvinck and Melle Runderkamp	January 29, 2018	0.81
Absent: Kate Bensdorp as Evie
23	3	"Max"	Erwin van den Eshof	Michel Bonset, Jeroen van der Zee and Melle Runderkamp	January 30, 2018	0.88
Absent: Kate Bensdorp as Evie
24	4	"Evie"	Erwin van den Eshof	Melle Runderkamp and Willem Bosch	January 31, 2018	0.95
Absent: Stony Blyden as Max
25	5	"The Museum"	Erwin van den Eshof	Melle Runderkamp and Willem Bosch	February 1, 2018	0.87
26	6	"The New Friend"	Hans Somers	Willem Bosch and Melle Runderkamp	February 2, 2018	1.04
Absent: Stony Blyden as Max, Thomas Jansen as Daniel
27	7	"The Family Tree"	Hans Somers	Willem Bosch and Melle Runderkamp	February 5, 2018	0.94
Absent: Stony Blyden as Max, Thomas Jansen as Daniel
28	8	"Payback"	Hans Somers	Willem Bosch and Melle Runderkamp	February 6, 2018	1.10
Absent: Stony Blyden as Max, Thomas Jansen as Daniel
29	9	"The Plan"	Hans Somers	Marije Willemsen, Michel Bonset and Melle Runderkamp	February 7, 2018	1.19
Absent: Stony Blyden as Max, Thomas Jansen as Daniel
30	10	"The Reverse Heist"	Hans Somers	Michel Bonset, Jeroen van der Zee and Melle Runderkamp	February 8, 2018	0.84
31	11	"The Mole"	Erwin van den Eshof	Willem Bosch, Paul de Vrijer and Melle Runderkamp	February 9, 2018	0.93
Absent: Stony Blyden as Max
32	12	"The Green Mask"	Erwin van den Eshof	Willem Bosch, Paul de Vrijer and Melle Runderkamp	February 12, 2018	1.10
Absent: Stony Blyden as Max
33	13	"Hacker Hideout"	Erwin van den Eshof	Elizabeth Lodeizen, Paul de Vrijer and Melle Runderkamp	February 13, 2018	1.01
Absent: Stony Blyden as Max
34	14	"The Super Secret Room"	Erwin van den Eshof	Elizabeth Lodeizen, Paul de Vrijer and Melle Runderkamp	February 14, 2018	1.02
Absent: Stony Blyden as Max
35	15	"The Crown"	Erwin van den Eshof	Paul de Vrijer and Melle Runderkamp	February 15, 2018	1.11
36	16	"Hide and Seek"	Hans Somers	Willem Bosch, Paul de Vrijer and Melle Runderkamp	February 16, 2018	0.95
37	17	"The Houseboat"	Hans Somers	Willem Bosch, Paul de Vrijer and Melle Runderkamp	February 20, 2018	0.95
Absent: Thomas Jansen as Daniel
38	18	"Spy"	Hans Somers	Elizabeth Lodeizen, Paul de Vrijer and Melle Runderkamp	February 21, 2018	0.98
Absent: Kate Bensdorp as Evie
39	19	"The Ritual"	Hans Somers	Reint Schölvinck, Paul de Vrijer and Melle Runderkamp	February 22, 2018	0.92
Absent: Stony Blyden as Max
40	20	"Hunters Forever"	Hans Somers	Reint Schölvinck, Paul de Vrijer and Melle Runderkamp	February 23, 2018	0.89

=== Season 3 (2019) ===
No. overall	No. in season	Title	Directed by	Written by	Original release date	U.S. viewers (millions)
41	1	"The Birthday Gift"	Hans Somers	Diane Whitley	July 29, 2019	0.11
Absent: Eliyha Altena as Oliver, Sarah Nauta as Jasmyn
42	2	"Strange House"	Hans Somers	Diane Whitley	July 30, 2019	0.11
Absent: Eliyha Altena as Oliver, Sarah Nauta as Jasmyn
43	3	"The Storm"	Hans Somers	Diane Whitley and Mark Oswin	July 31, 2019	0.09
Absent: Eliyha Altena as Oliver, Sarah Nauta as Jasmyn
44	4	"Jake's Curse"	Hans Somers	Diane Whitley and Emma Nisbet	August 1, 2019	0.13
Absent: Eliyha Altena as Oliver, Sarah Nauta as Jasmyn
45	5	"Lost in the Woods"	Hans Somers	Diane Whitley and Emma Nisbet	August 2, 2019	0.05
Absent: Eliyha Altena as Oliver, Sarah Nauta as Jasmyn Note: Eliyha Altena is credited in this episode, but does not make a physical appearance. Only his voice can be heard at the end of the episode.
46	6	"Oliver"	Hans Somers	Diane Whitley and Tony Cooke	August 5, 2019	0.08
Absent: Sarah Nauta as Jasmyn
47	7	"The Code"	Hans Somers and Bob Wilbers	Diane Whitley and Tony Cooke	August 6, 2019	0.10
Absent: Sarah Nauta as Jasmyn
48	8	"Remedies and Riddles"	Hans Somers and Bob Wilbers	Diane Whitley and Danny Spring	August 7, 2019	0.09
49	9	"Curse or Cure?"	Hans Somers and Bob Wilbers	Diane Whitley and Julia Kent	August 8, 2019	0.09
50	10	"The Second Stone"	Hans Somers and Bob Wilbers	Diane Whitley and Mark Oswin	August 9, 2019	0.07
51	11	"Return to Hunter Street"	Hans Somers and Bob Wilbers	Diane Whitley, Emma Nisbet, and Mark Oswin	August 12, 2019	0.11
Absent: Kate Bensdorp as Evie
52	12	"Mr. Bear"	Hans Somers and Bob Wilbers	Diane Whitley, Emma Nisbet, and Mark Oswin	August 13, 2019	0.12
Absent: Sarah Nauta as Jasmyn
53	13	"Rex to the Rescue"	Hans Somers	Diane Whitley and Julia Kent	August 14, 2019	0.10
54	14	"Secret Signs"	Hans Somers	Diane Whitley and Tony Cooke	August 15, 2019	0.11
55	15	"Evil Narikoa"	Hans Somers	Diane Whitley	August 16, 2019	0.10
Absent: Kate Bensdorp as Evie
56	16	"Siblings"	Hans Somers	Diane Whitley	September 9, 2019	0.09
Absent: Kate Bensdorp as Evie
57	17	"What Hides Beneath"	Hans Somers	Diane Whitley and Mark Oswin	September 10, 2019	0.10
58	18	"The Butterfly Sun"	Hans Somers	Diane Whitley and Danny Spring	September 11, 2019	0.12
59	19	"Appeals"	Hans Somers	Diane Whitley and Danny Spring	September 12, 2019	0.12
60	20	"Trapped"	Hans Somers	Diane Whitley and Tony Cooke	September 13, 2019	0.09
Absent: Kate Bensdorp as Evie
61	21	"Escape"	Hans Somers	Diane Whitley	September 16, 2019	0.12
62	22	"Moms"	Hans Somers	Diane Whitley and Paul de Vrijer	September 17, 2019	0.09
63	23	"Swamped"	Hans Somers	Diane Whitley and Julia Kent	September 18, 2019	0.11
64	24	"Truth and Lies"	Hans Somers	Diane Whitley and Julia Kent	September 19, 2019	0.07
65	25	"The Final Riddle?"	Hans Somers	Diane Whitley and Julia Kent	September 20, 2019	0.12
Absent: Kate Bensdorp as Evie
66	26	"Revelations"	Hans Somers	Diane Whitley and Tony Cooke	September 23, 2019	N/A
Absent: Kate Bensdorp as Evie
67	27	"Not Quite X Marks the Spot"	Hans Somers	Diane Whitley and Danny Spring	September 24, 2019	N/A
Absent: Kate Bensdorp as Evie
68	28	"Tricky Times"	Hans Somers	Diane Whitley	September 25, 2019	N/A
69	29	"The Pyramid"	Hans Somers	Diane Whitley	September 26, 2019	N/A
70	30	"Eclipse"	Hans Somers	Diane Whitley	September 27, 2019	0.16

=== Season 4 (2021) ===
No. overall	No. in season	Title	Directed by	Written by	Original U.K. air date	Viewers (millions)
71	1	"An Unexpected Guest"	Erwin van den Eshof	Diane Whitley	April 19, 2021	N/A
72	2	"Babies, Bunnies and Beards"	Erwin van den Eshof	Diane Whitley	April 20, 2021	N/A
73	3	"Sally Hunter"	Erwin van den Eshof	Diane Whitley	April 21, 2021	N/A
74	4	"Quantum Problems and Dead Ends"	Erwin van den Eshof	Diane Whitley	April 22, 2021	N/A
75	5	"House Arrest"	Erwin van den Eshof	Diane Whitley	April 26, 2021	N/A
76	6	"The Intruder"	Jonathan Elbers	Diane Whitley	April 27, 2021	N/A
77	7	"Mind Games"	Jonathan Elbers	Diane Whitley	April 28, 2021	N/A
78	8	"Break-in"	Jonathan Elbers	Diane Whitley	April 29, 2021	N/A
79	9	"Relatively Speaking"	Jonathan Elbers	Diane Whitley	May 3, 2021	N/A
80	10	"Enemies Within"	Jonathan Elbers	Diane Whitley	May 4, 2021	N/A
81	11	"Badika"	Erwin van den Eshof	Diane Whitley	May 5, 2021	N/A
82	12	"Operation Rockabye"	Jonathan Elbers	Diane Whitley	May 6, 2021	N/A
83	13	"Sleepwalkers"	Erwin van den Eshof	Diane Whitley	May 10, 2021	N/A
84	14	"Saving Anika"	Erwin van den Eshof	Diane Whitley	May 11, 2021	N/A
85	15	"I Spy"	Erwin van den Eshof	Diane Whitley	May 12, 2021	N/A
86	16	"Hologram: Unlocked"	Erwin van den Eshof	Diane Whitley	May 13, 2021	N/A
87	17	"The Missing Piece"	Erwin van den Eshof	Diane Whitley	May 17, 2021	N/A
88	18	"Testing Times"	Erwin van den Eshof	Diane Whitley	May 18, 2021	N/A
89	19	"Brainwooshed"	Erwin van den Eshof	Diane Whitley	May 19, 2021	N/A
90	20	"Showdown"	Erwin van den Eshof	Diane Whitley	May 20, 2021	N/A

== Special (2017) ==
Title	Original release date	U.S. viewers (millions)
"Clued In: A Hunter Street Special"	March 17, 2017	1.11
