= Hello (Cho Yong-pil album) =

Studio album by Cho Yong-pil
- Released: April 23, 2013
- Recorded: 2011–13
- Genre: K-pop; pop rock
- Length: 38:19
- Label: Pil Records

Cho Yong-pil chronology
Over The Rainbow (2003)	Hello (2013)

Singles from Hello
- 1. "Bounce" Released: April 16, 2013; 2. "Hello" Released: April 23, 2013

Hello is the nineteenth studio album by South Korean singer Cho Yong-pil. It was released on April 23, 2013, through his self-founded label Pil Records, and marked his first album release in ten years. Mostly recognized for his trot and folk-centered discography, the production of Hello was primarily handled by Western producers and explored a new style of music in comparison to his previous works.

The album, along with its singles, were met with acclaim following its release. "Bounce" was named Song of the Year by various organizations while Hello won several album awards. The album experienced commercial success, topping the Gaon Albums Chart and sold more than 250,000 copies in 2013, making it the year's fifth best-selling album in South Korea.

== Background and release ==
On March 21, 2013, the title of Cho Yong-pil's nineteenth studio Hello was announced, set for release on April 23, 2013. Five days later, the album's artwork was unveiled; the cover depicts a concert's hall stage lighting (representing his passion for music), with the written word "Hello" on the side–which conveys Cho's re-entering of the music scene and reunion with the public for the first time in a decade. Marking his first full album release since September 2003's Over The Rainbow, the record contains 10 tracks that were mixed and mastered in five different countries worldwide, including the United States, Australia, United Kingdom, and Thailand. Cho received more than 700 tracks from domestic and international composers for the record, and ultimately boiled down the selection to ten songs that he believed were the most trendy. Six out of the ten tracks were composed by foreign songwriters—the first time he had worked with international composers since his debut in 1968.

== Singles ==
"Bounce" was released as the first single a week prior to the album. Upon the single's release, "Cho Yong-pil" and "Bounce" both became top-ten search terms on online portals Naver and Daum. A contemporary pop rock number, it possesses a rather light and bouncy character and contains various instrumentations, including that of keyboards and acoustic guitars. Primarily known as a traditional trot and folk singer in South Korea prior to Hello, Cho utilized English words in his lyrics for the first time in the track. It was recorded during the span of two years with its mixing and mastering handled in the United States and United Kingdom.

"Bounce" experienced commercially success domestically, it debuted at number two on the Gaon Digital Chart and peaked at number one on the K-pop Hot 100. On the latter chart's year-end issue for 2013, the song ranked at number two. It was widely well received; it was selected as the Song of the Year through public opinion polls by Gallup Korea and was ranked the fourth best K-pop song of 2013 by Billboard. Korean Music Awards selection committee member Sung Woo-jin praised its modern composition and noted how it has received broad attention across various generations from children to the elderly.

The second single, "Hello", served as the title track and was released in conjunction with the release of the album. It exhibits similar pop-rock musical styles present in "Bounce". It's accompanying music video was directed by Choi Yong-seok of Lumpens studio and was filmed in Canada and South Korea. It depicts the story of a boy who falls in love with a girl who lives next door and expresses his feelings through various forms of music. The video stars James Lee McQuown, Maemae Renfrow, Julian Banks, and Magna Fall.

== Accolades ==
Hello and its singles received numerous awards, including the Song of the Year daesang for "Bounce" at the 2013 Mnet Asian Music Awards and 11th Korean Music Awards in addition to Best Album at the 23rd Seoul Music Awards. Both of the singles "Hello" and "Bounce" achieved the top spots on South Korean music programs during the course of its promotion; his first award for "Hello" on May 1 marked his first music show win since 1990 with "Reunion in Memories".

Awards and nominations
Year	Award-giving body	Nominee	Category	Result	Ref.
2013	Mnet Asian Music Awards	Hello	Album of the Year	Nominated	
2013	Mnet Asian Music Awards	"Hello"	Best Music Video	Nominated	
2013	Mnet Asian Music Awards	"Bounce"	Song of the Year	Won	
2013	Mnet Asian Music Awards	"Bounce"	Best Vocal Performance – Male	Nominated	
2013	Melon Music Awards	"Bounce"	Best Rock Award	Won	
2013	SBS M Best of the Best	Hello	Best Comeback	Won	
2014	Gaon Chart Music Awards	Hello	Album of the Year – 2nd Quarter	Won	
2014	Golden Disc Awards	Hello	Album Bonsang	Won	
2014	Korean Music Awards	"Bounce"	Song of the Year	Won	
2014	Korean Music Awards	"Bounce"	Best Pop Song	Won	
2014	Seoul Music Awards	Hello	Best Album	Won	

Music program awards
Song	Program	Date	Ref.
"Hello"	Show Champion (MBC M)	May 1, 2013	
"Bounce"	Music Bank (KBS)	May 3, 2013	
"Bounce"	Music Bank (KBS)	May 10, 2013	
"Bounce"	Music Bank (KBS)	December 20, 2013	
"Bounce"	Show! Music Core (MBC)	May 4, 2013	

== Track listing ==
Hello track listing
No.	Title	Lyrics	Music	Arrangement	Length
1.	"Bounce"	Choi Woo-mi	Marty Dodson, Alexander Holmgren, Carl Utbult	Marty Dodson, Alexander Holmgren, Carl Utbult	3:03
2.	"Hello" (featuring Verbal Jint)	Choi Woo-mi, Verbal Jint (rap lyrics)	Scott Krippayne, Niclas Lundin, Maria Marcus	Scott Krippayne, Niclas Lundin, Maria Marcus	3:27
3.	"Walking Along with You"	Kim Eana	MGR	MGR, Park Yong-jun, Park In-young	4:44
4.	"Need to Be Recharged"	Kim Sun-jin, Eun Choi	Jeff Cohen, Niclas Lundin, Maria Marcus	Jeff Cohen, Niclas Lundin, Maria Marcus	3:23
5.	"First Love"	Doing	Hagi, Park Byung-jun	Park Byung-jun, Tommy Kim	4:13
6.	"Should I Tell"	Yang Jae-sun	Neil Athale, Jorge Mhondera, Derek Mcdonald	Neil Athale, Jorge Mhondera, Derek Mcdonald	4:04
7.	"When I Am with You"	Kim Seon-jin	HerOism, Matthew Gerrard, Kult Schneider	Matthew Gerrard	3:23
8.	"One Day on the Way Back Home"	Song Ho-geun	Cho Yong-pil	Park Byung-jun, Park In-young	4:22
9.	"Romance"	Choi Eun, Lee Jong-hee	Neil Athale, Mike Hough, Daniel de Bourg		3:45
10.	"Moving Forward"	Choi Woo-mi	MGR, Park Won-jun	Kim Hyun-seo, Park In-young	3:51
Total length:					38:19

== Charts ==
=== Weekly charts ===
Chart (2013)	Peak position
South Korean Albums (Gaon)	1

=== Monthly charts ===
Chart (May 2013)	Peak position
South Korean Albums (Gaon)	1

=== Yearly charts ===
Chart (2013)	Position
South Korean Albums (Gaon)	5
