= Kim Jong-hwan (singer) =

South Korean singer

- Born: Kim Gil-nam; February 1, 1966 (age 60); South Korea
- Genre: Pop ballad
- Occupation: Singer
- Years active: 1985–present

Korean name
- Hangul: 김길남
- RR: Gim Gilnam
- MR: Kim Killam

Stage name
- Hangul: 김종환
- RR: Gim Jonghwan
- MR: Kim Chonghwan

Kim Jong-hwan (Korean: 김종환; born February 1, 1966) is a South Korean singer, referred to as the "Emperor of the Adult Ballad," for his popularity among middle-aged fans. He debuted in 1985 with the album, I Have No Place to Rest, and is known for pop ballads including, "Reason for Existence," and "One Hundred Year Promise."

== Discography ==
=== Studio albums ===
Title	Album details	Peak chart positions	Sales
Title	Album details	KOR	Sales
I Have No Place to Rest (쉴 곳 없는 나)	Released: 1985; Reissued: 1992; Label: Hwasung; Format: CD, cassette	No data	No data
My Love, My Song (내 사랑 나의 노래)	Released: 1993; Label: Pro Media; Format: CD, cassette	No data	No data
Reason for Existence (존재의 이유)	Released: 1996; Label: Apple Production; Format: CD, cassette	No data	KOR: 2,500,000+
For Love (사랑을 위하여)	Released: 1997; Label: Apple Production; Format: CD, cassette	No data	KOR: 3,000,000+
Until The Day We Love (사랑하는날까지)	Released: 1998; Label: Apple Production; Format: CD, cassette	No data	No data
One Hundred Year Promise (백년의 약속)	Released: May 4, 2000; Label: Doremi Media Co.; Format: CD, cassette	17	KOR: 33,029+
Now And Forever	Released: November 4, 2003; Label: Doremi Media Co.; Format: CD, cassette	16	KOR: 11,764+
Two Become One (둘이 하나되어)	Released: April 22, 2005; Label: Kim's Music; Format: CD, cassette	26	KOR: 4,019+
30th Anniversary Album (데뷔 30주년 기념음반)	Released: October 15, 2013; Label: Kim's Music; Format: CD, digital download	38	—N/a

== Awards ==
Year	Awards	Category	Nominated work	Result	Ref.
1996	Golden Disc Awards	Popularity Award	Reason for Existence	Won	
1998	Golden Disc Awards	Album of the Year	For Love	Won	
1998	Seoul Music Awards	Bonsang (Main Prize)	—N/a	Won	
