= 2013 Mnet Asian Music Awards =

Popular music awards

- Date: November 22, 2013
- Location: AsiaWorld–Arena, Hong Kong
- Hosted by: Lee Seung-gi
- Most awards: G-Dragon (4)
- Most nominations: Cho Yong-pil (6)
- Website: Mnet Asian Music Awards

Television/radio coverage
- Network: South Korea: Mnet; Japan: Mnet Japan; Southeast Asia: Channel M Thailand: Bang Channel; Cambodia: MyTV
- Runtime: around 300 minutes

The 2013 Mnet Asian Music Awards took place on November 22, 2013, at AsiaWorld-Arena in Hong Kong. The ceremony was the fourth consecutive Mnet Asian Music Awards to occur outside of South Korea.

Nominations were announced on October 23, 2013. Leading the nominees were Cho Yong-pil with six, followed by Psy, G-Dragon, and Girls' Generation with five nominations each. By the end of the ceremony, G-Dragon received the most wins with four awards, which includes the daesang (or grand prize) award "Artist of the Year.

== Background ==
This event marked the fifteenth Mnet Asian Music Awards. Using its slogan "Music Makes One" for the third consecutive time, MAMA was broadcast live in China, Japan, Hong Kong and Southeast Asia through various channels, as well as around the world.

This is the first time that the three daesang awards were presented separately. The first daesang, the song of the year award, was given at the end of the first block, the second daesang, the artist of the year award, was given at the end of the second block, and the third daesang, the album of the year award was given at the finale. After the last daesang award was given, Stevie Wonder performed. More than 10,000 people attended the ceremony.

== Performers ==
The following individuals and groups, listed in order of appearance, performed musical numbers.

Name(s)	Performed	Notes
Jaurim, Lee Ha-Neul, Jay Park	"Icarus", Enter The Dragon	"Enter The MAMA" (Opening Act)
Trouble Maker, Infinite	"Now", "Before The Dawn", "Destiny"	"Gangs Of Hong Kong"
Aaron Kwok	"Yi Ge Hui Wu"	"비망록 (Memorandum)"
2NE1, Icona Pop	"Lonely", "Missing You", "All Night", "I Love It"	"4 Love"
Dancing 9	—	"Trophy Disappeared"
Ylvis and Crayon Pop	"What Does the Fox Say?", "Bar Bar Bar"	"The Fox Says 'Bar Bar Bar'"
Parc Jae-jung and Zhu Jia Jia	"Annie", "We Are Young "	"We Are Super Stars"
Lee Seung-gi	"Return" Orchestra ver.	"애상곡 (Love Song)"
EXO	Intro, "Growl", "Wolf"	"Ein süßer Traum (A Sweet Dream)"
Rain	"How To Avoid The Sun", "It's Raining", "Hip Song"	"Man of The Moment"
Big Bang	"Doom Dada", "Ringa Linga", "Strong Baby" & "Let's Talk About Love", "Sober (G-Dragon verse) / Crooked", "Fantastic Baby"	"The Human"
Stevie Wonder, Hyolyn, Aaron Kwok	"I Just Called to Say I Love You", "Lately", "Isn't She Lovely", "Superstition"	"He's A Wonder"
Paris Hilton	DJ	(Ending)

== Presenters ==
2013 Mnet Asian Music Awards host

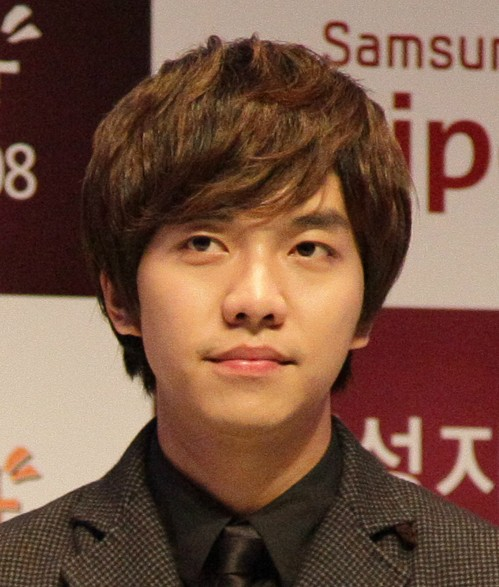
Lee Seung-gi

- Lee Seung-gi – Main host
- Sung Joon and Kim So-yeon – Presenters of Best Dance Performance Award - Female Solo
- Ryan Seacrest (via VTR) – Introduced the nominees for Best Dance Performance Award - Female Group
- Sung Joon and Kim So-yeon – Presenters of Best Dance Performance Award - Female Group
- Kim Jong-kook and Song Ji-hyo – Presenters of NISSAN JUKE Best Music Video
- Lee Seung-chul – Presenter of the special award for Discovery of the Year
- Lee Soo-hyuk and Hong Jong-hyun – Presenters of Best New Female Artist
- Lee Seo-jin – Introduced the recipients of Best Asian Artist Awards
- Paris Hilton – Presenter of the award for Best Male Artist
- Lee Bo-young and Jang Hyuk – Presenters of BC UnionPay Song of the Year
- Dancing 9 – Presenters of Best Dance Performance Award - Male Solo
- Yoo Se-yoon and Miriam Yeung – Best Vocal Performance - Female
- Cha Ye-ryun – Presenter of the special award for Style in Music
- Jung Woo and Go Ara – Presenters of the special award for Next Generation Global Star Female, Sony MDR Worldwide Performer
- Jay Park – Presenter of the award for International Favorite Artist
- Aaron Kwok and Han Chae-young – Presenters of BC UnionPay Artist of the Year
- Kim Yoon-ah of Jaurim – Introduced performer Lee Seung-gi and presenter of the award for Best Vocal Performance - Male
- Lee Ha-neul – Presenter of the award for Best Rap Performance
- Lee Ha-neul and Dynamic Duo – Presenters of Best Band Performance
- G-Dragon, Seungri, and Taeyang of Big Bang – Presenters of Music Makes One Global Ambassador Award
- Lee Dong-wook and Sung Yu-ri – Presenters of Best Female Group, Best Male Group
- Song Ji-hyo – Introduced performers Big Bang
- Go Joon-hee – Presenter of the special award for Best Concert Performer
- Kim Ji-hoon and Han Ji-hye – Presenters of Best Female Artist
- Go Soo – Presenter for the award for BC UnionPay Album of the Year
- Lee Seung-gi – Introduced performer Stevie Wonder

== Winners and nominees ==
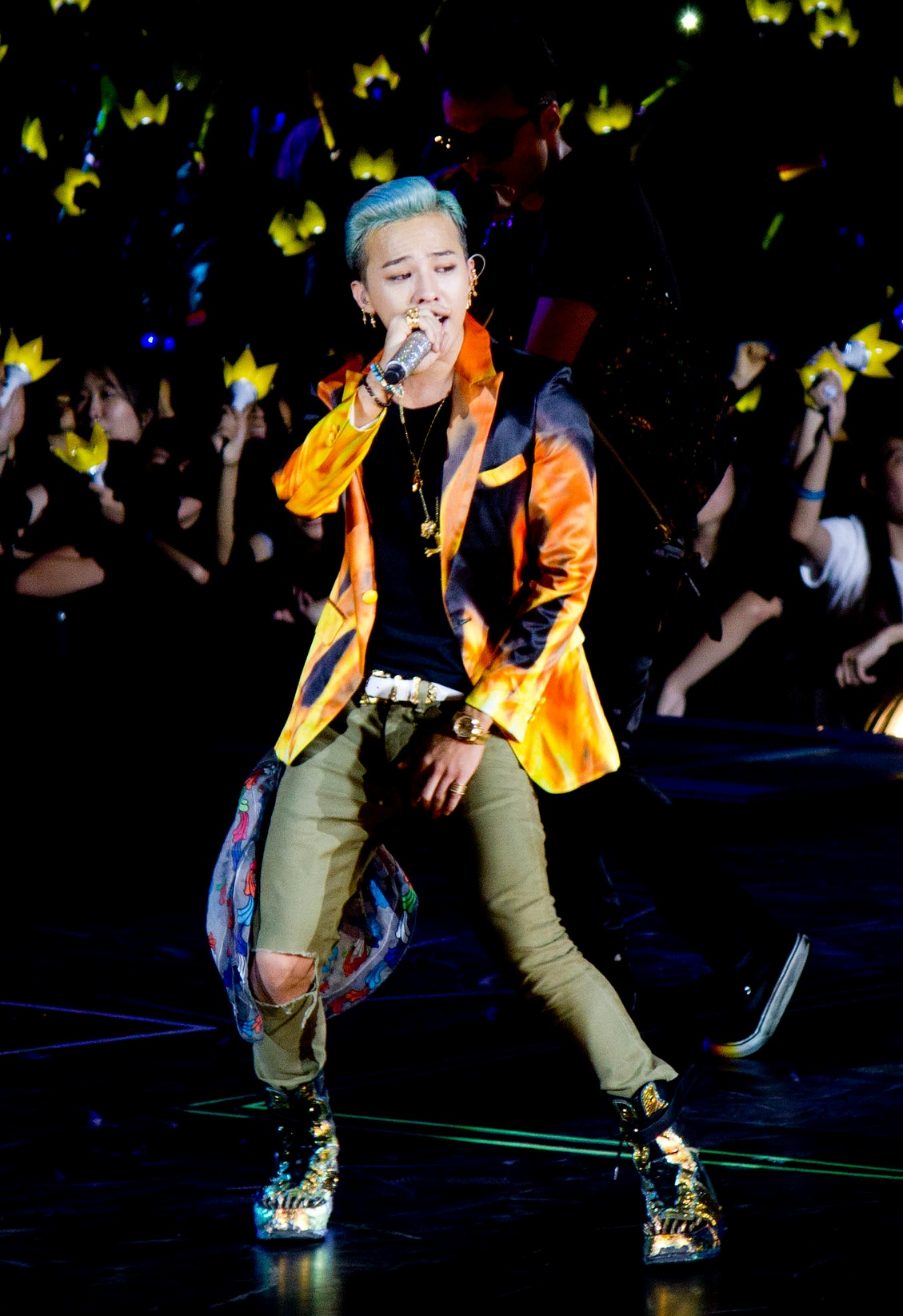
G-Dragon, Received multiple awards including Artist of the Year

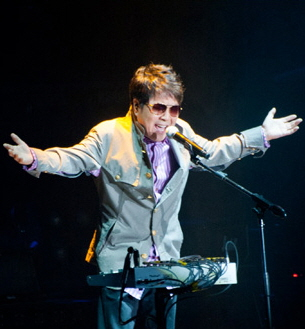
Cho Yong-pil, Song of the Year

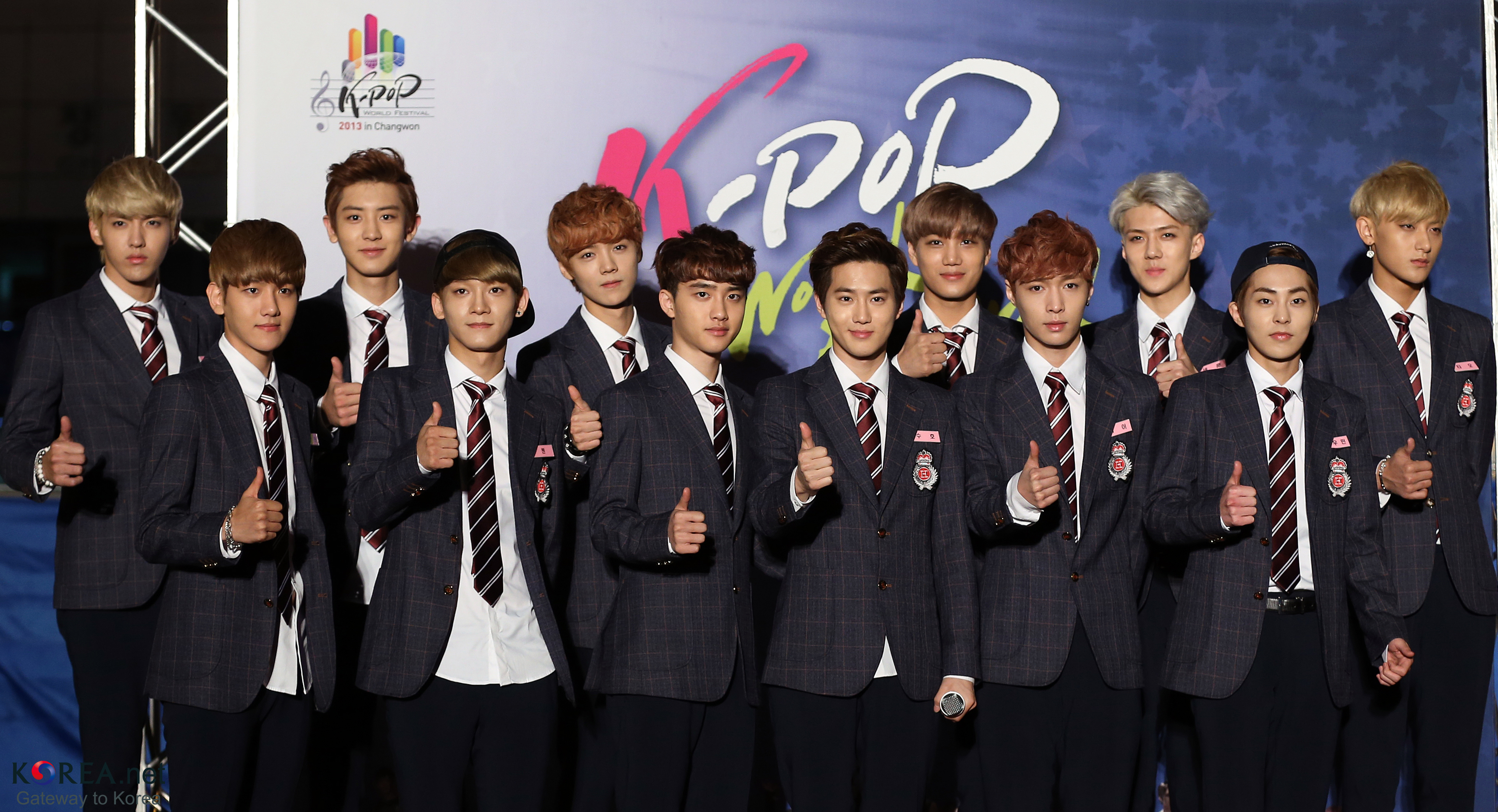
Exo, Album of the Year

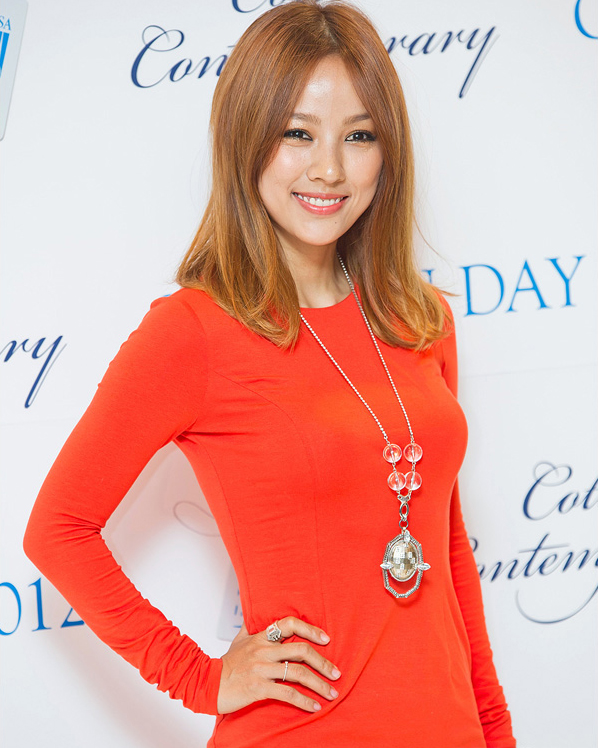
Lee Hyori, Best Female Artist

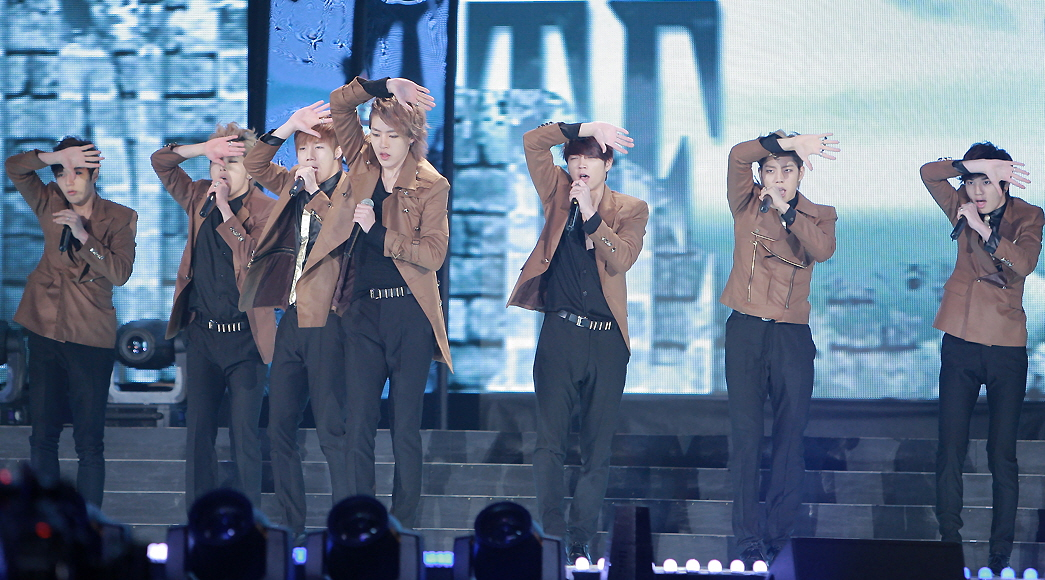
Infinite, Best Male Group

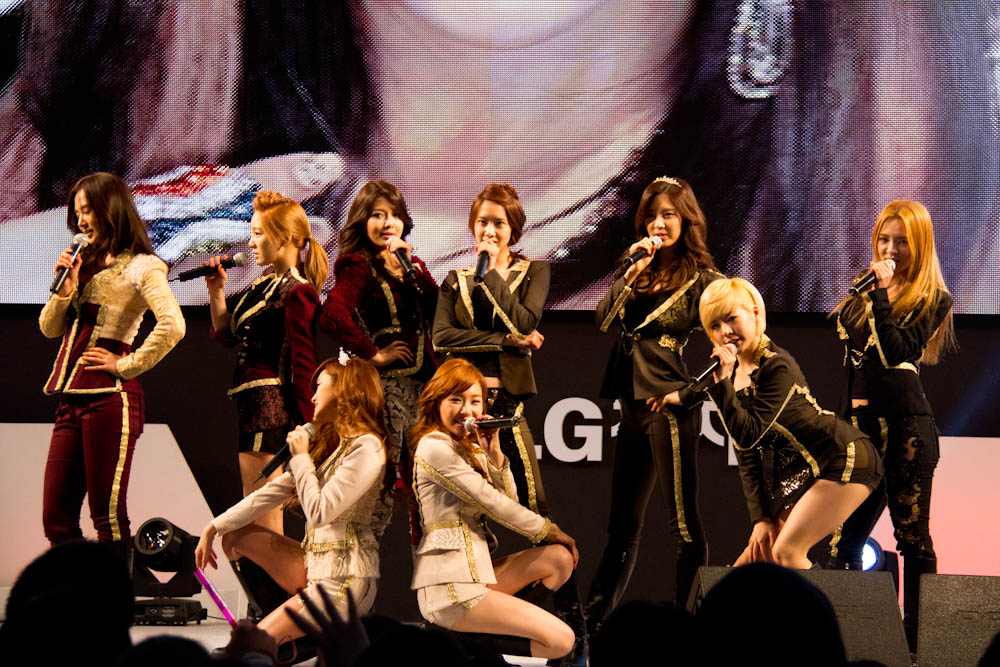
Girls' Generation, Best Female Group

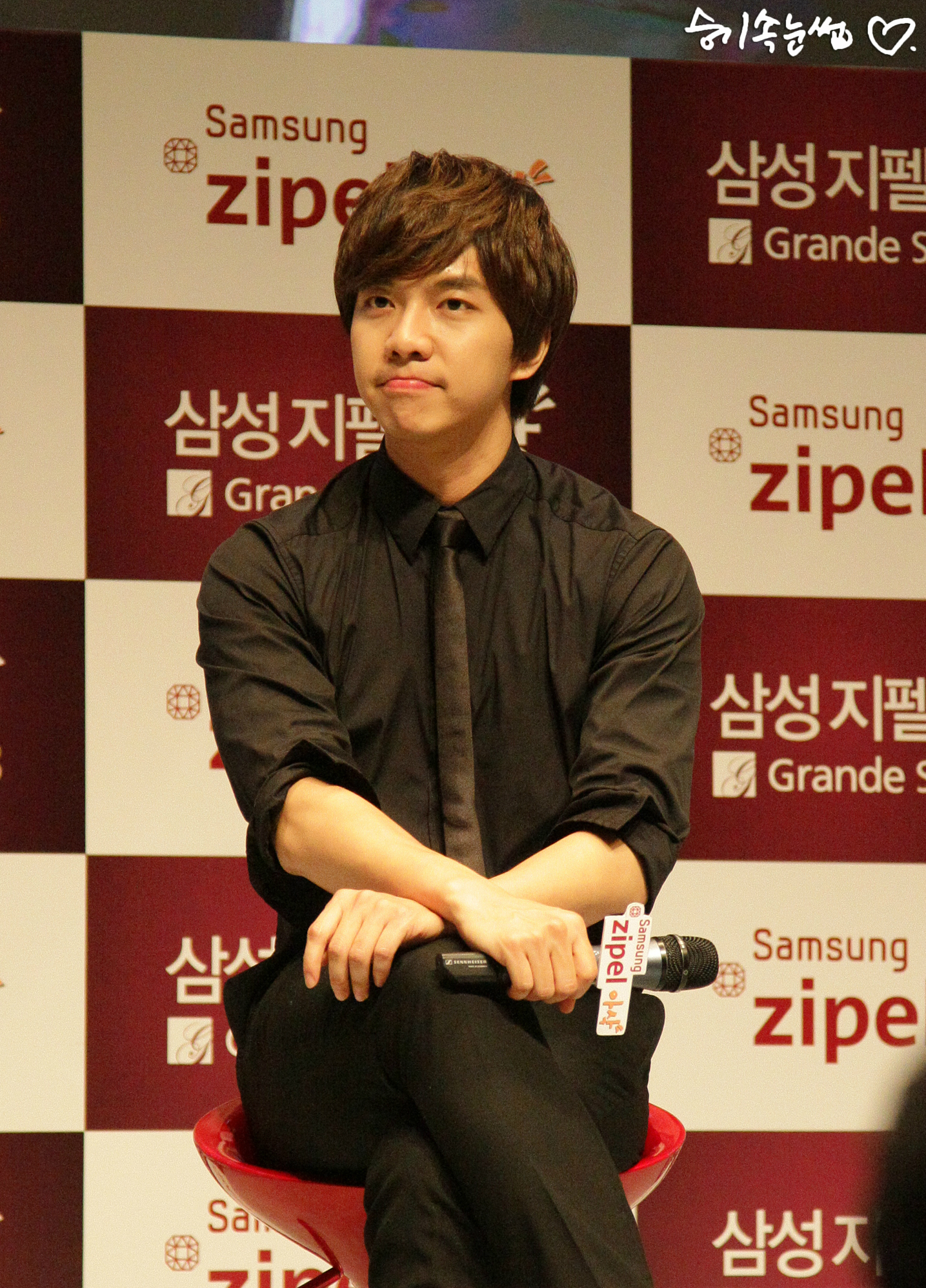
Lee Seung-gi, Best Male Vocal Performance

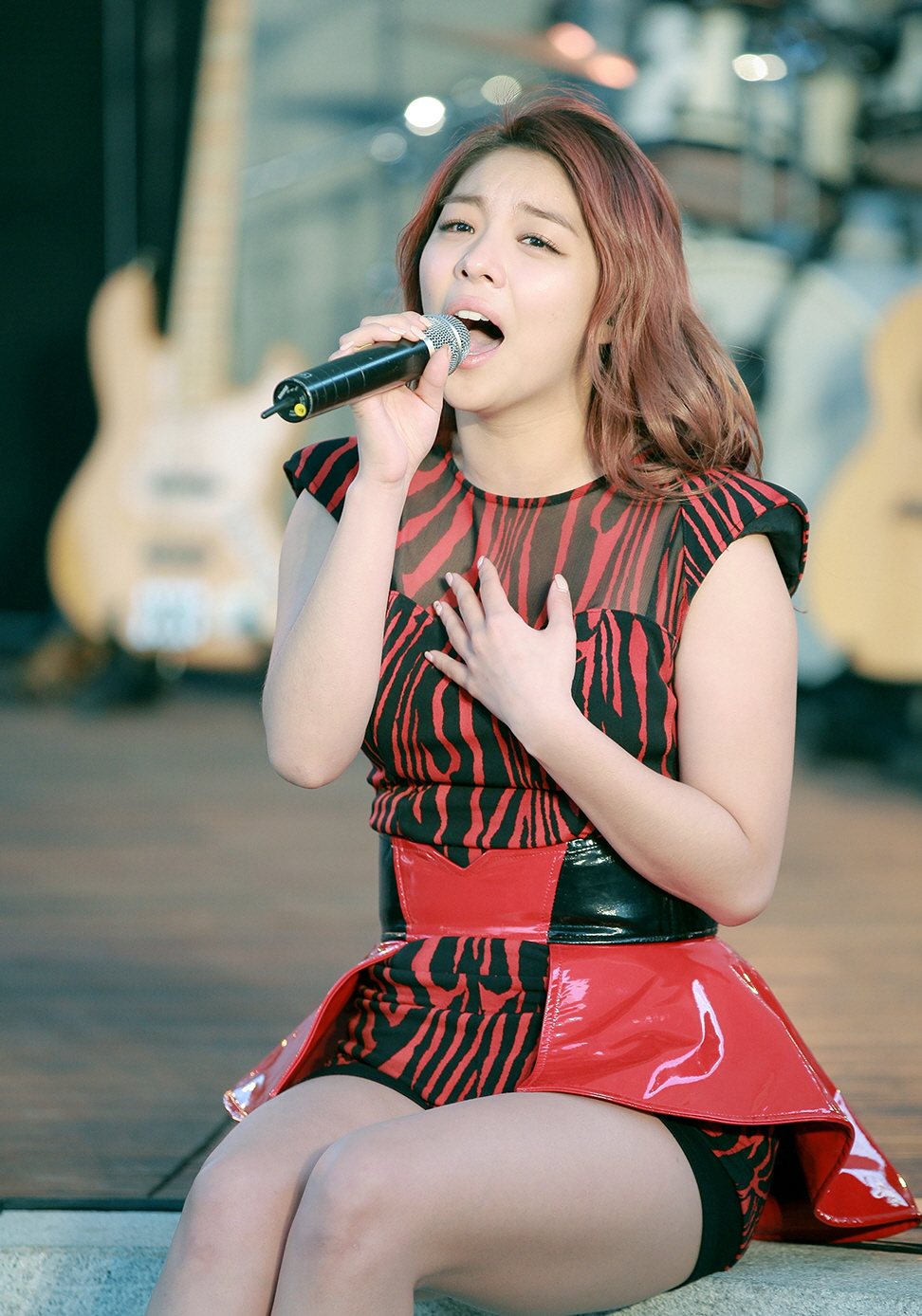
Ailee, Best Female Vocal Performance

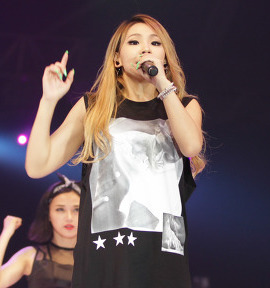
CL, Best Female Solo Dance Performance

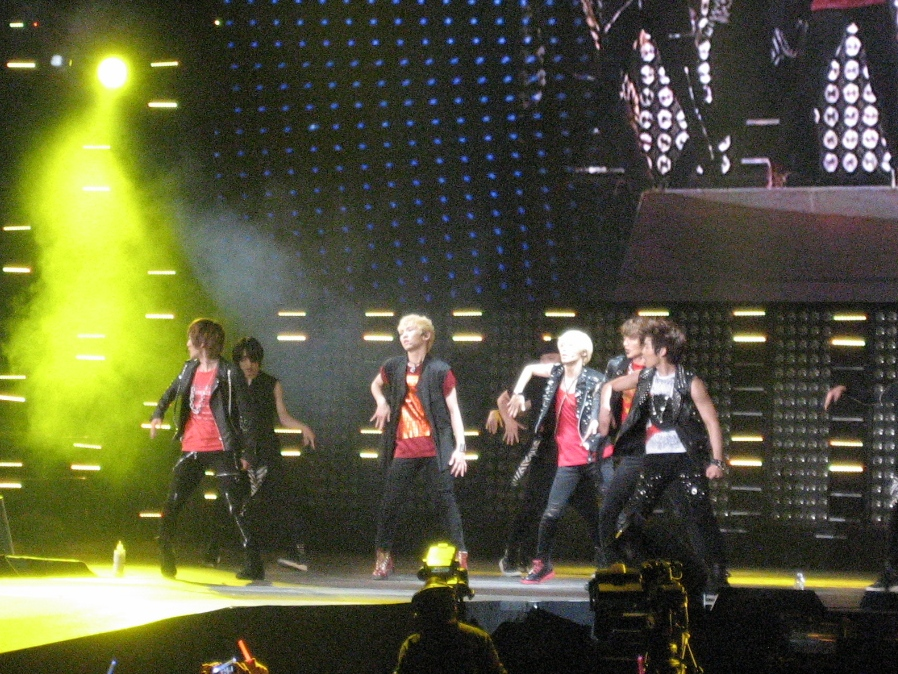
Shinee, Best Male Group Dance Performance

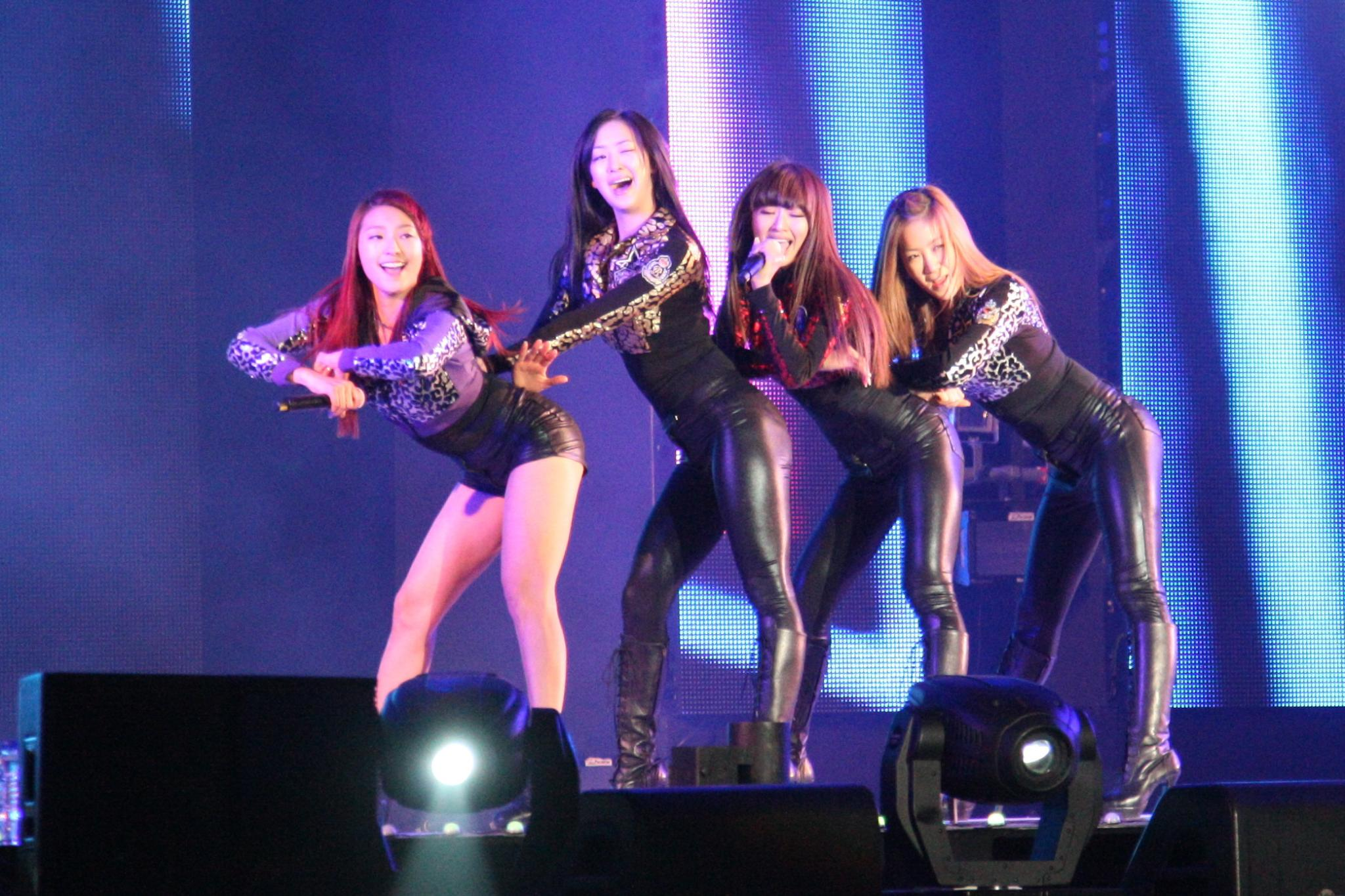
Sistar, Best Female Group Dance Performance

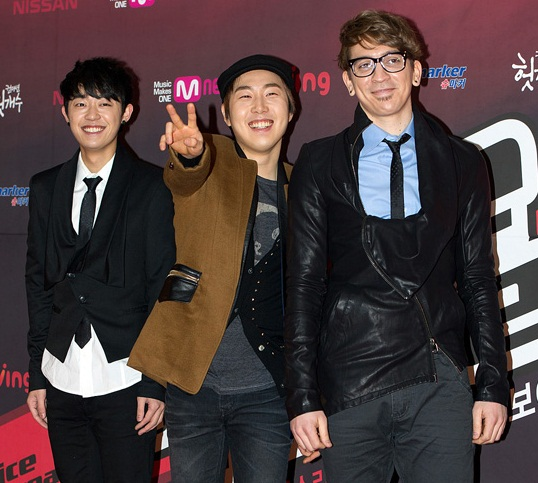
Busker Busker, Best Band Performance

Best Asian Artist

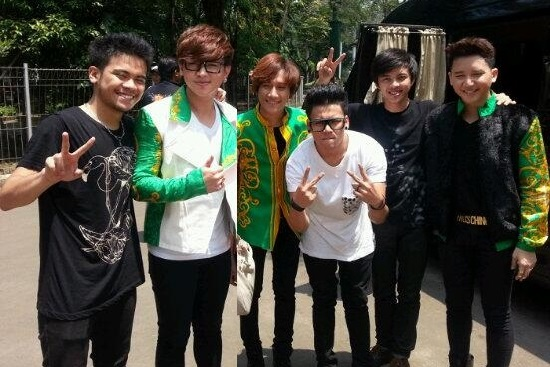
SM*SH

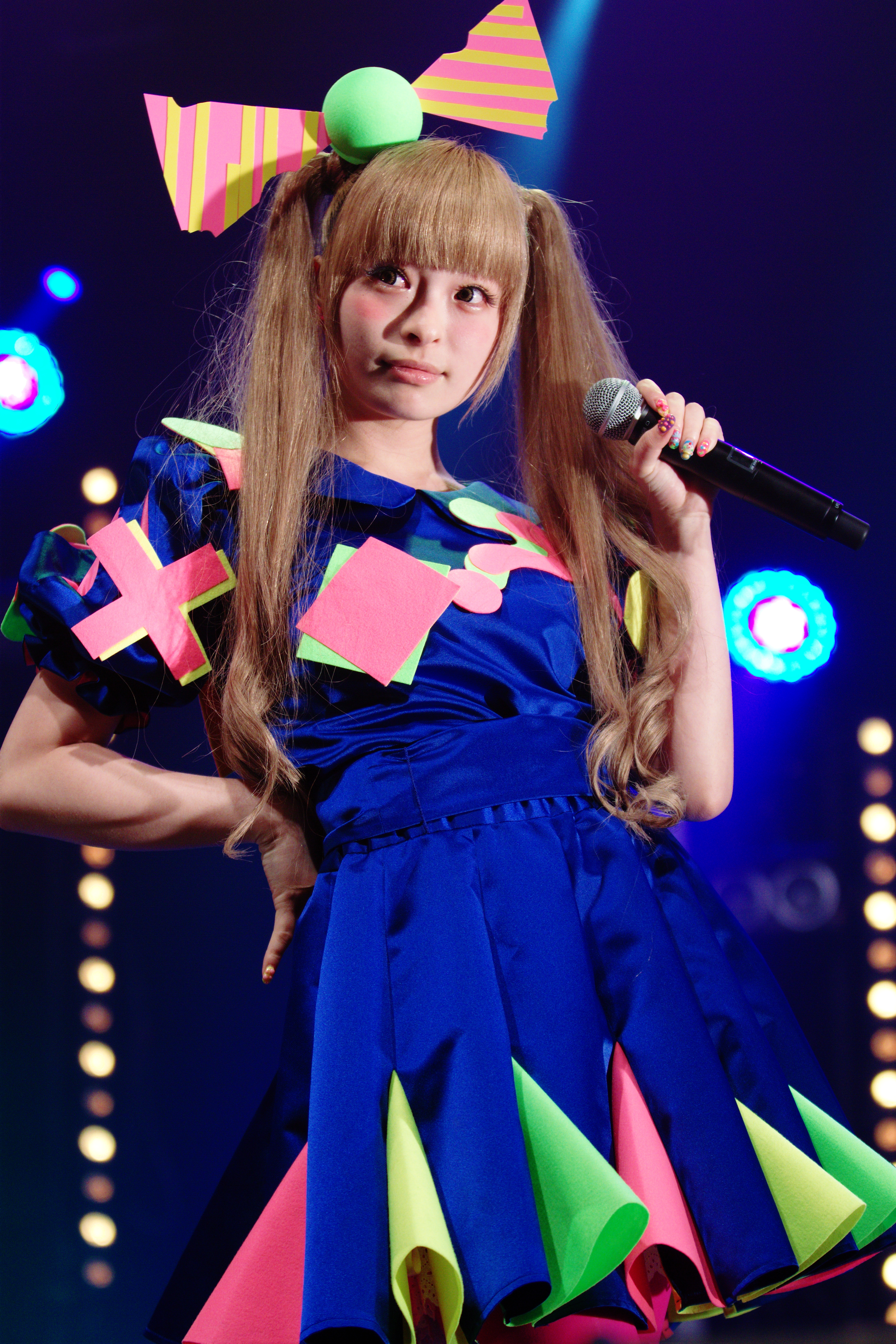
Kyary Pamyu Pamyu

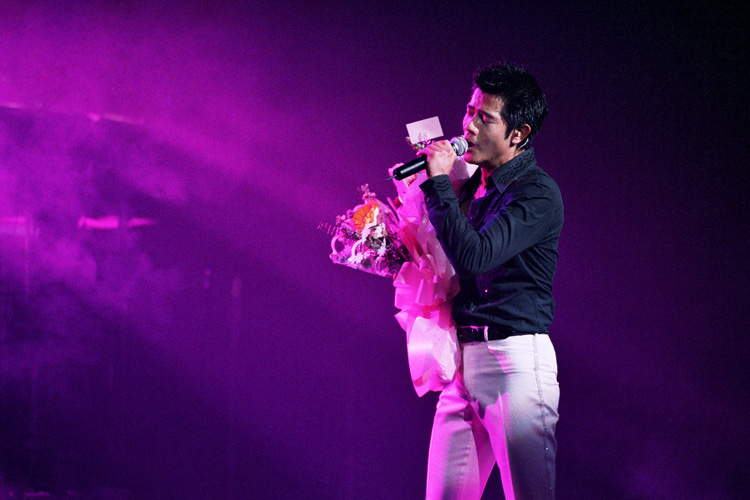
Aaron Kwok

Winners are listed first and highlighted in boldface.

Album of the Year (Daesang)	Artist of the Year (Daesang)
**Exo – XOXO**; G-Dragon – Coup D'Etat; Cho Yong-pil – Hello; Girls' Generation – I Got a Boy; Shinee – Chapter 1. Dream Girl – The Misconceptions of You	**G-Dragon**; Exo; Girls' Generation; Psy; Cho Yong-pil
Song of the Year (Daesang)	Nissan Juke Best Music Video
**Cho Yong-pil – "Bounce"**; Busker Busker – "First Love"; Girls' Generation – "I Got a Boy"; Psy – "Gentleman"; Crayon Pop – "Bar Bar Bar"	**G-Dragon – "Coup D'Etat" (Director: Seo Hyun-seung)**; Busker Busker – "First Love" (Director: Yong Lee); Psy – "Gentleman" (Director: Jo Su-hyun); Lee Seung-chul – "My Love" (Director: Cha Eun-taek); Cho Yong-pil – "Hello" (Director: Koo Young-jun (Lumpens))
Best Male Artist	Best Female Artist
**G-Dragon**; Psy; Lee Seung-gi; Lee Seung-chul; Cho Yong-pil	**Lee Hyori**; Baek Ji-young; Sunmi; IU; Ailee
Best Male Group	Best Female Group
**Infinite**; Exo; Shinee; Shinhwa; Teen Top	**Girls' Generation**; 2NE1; Sistar; f(x); 4Minute
Best Dance Performance - Male Group	Best Dance Performance - Female Group
**Exo – "Growl"**; B1A4 – "What's Going On"; Beast – "Shadow"; Shinee – "Dream Girl"; Infinite – "Man In Love"	**Sistar – "Give It to Me"**; Girl's Day – "Expectation"; Girls' Generation – "I Got a Boy"; Crayon Pop – "Bar Bar Bar"; 4Minute – "What's Your Name?"
Best Dance Performance - Male Solo	Best Dance Performance - Female Solo
**G-Dragon – "Crooked"**; Jay Park – "Joah"; Seungri – "Gotta Talk To U"; Psy – "Gentleman"; Yang Yo-seob – "Caffeine"	**CL – "The Baddest Female"**; G.NA – "Oops!"; Seo In-young – "Please Love Me"; Sunmi – "24 Hours"; Lee Hyori – "Bad Girls"
International Favorite Artist	Best Band Performance
**Ylvis**	**Busker Busker – "First Love"**; CN Blue – "I'm Sorry"; Nell – "Ocean Of Light"; DickPunks – "Viva Primavera"; Jaurim – "Twenty Five, Twenty One"
Best Vocal Performance - Male	Best Vocal Performance - Female
**Lee Seung-gi – "Return"**; 2AM – "One Spring Day"; Cho Yong-pil – "Bounce"; K.Will – "Love Blossom"; Lee Seung-chul – "My Love"	**Ailee – "U&I"**; Davichi – "Turtle"; Lyn – "Breakable Heart"; IU – "The Red Shoes"; Lee Hi – "1,2,3,4"
Best OST	Best Rap Performance
**Yoon Mi-rae – "Touch Love" (Master's Sun)**; Davichi – "Don't You Know" (IRIS 2); Jungyup – "Why Did You Come Now?" (I Can Hear Your Voice); Suzy – "Don't Forget Me" (Gu Family Book); The One – "Winter Love" (That Winter, the Wind Blows)	**Dynamic Duo – "BAAAM"**; MFBTY – "Sweet Dream"; Geeks – "Wash Away"; Baechigi – "Shower of Tears"; Verbal Jint – "If It Ain't Love"
Best New Male Artist	Best New Female Artist
**Roy Kim**; BTS; Bumkey; Jung Joon-young; Yoo Seung-woo	**Crayon Pop**; Kim Ye-lim; Ladies' Code; Yoo Sung-eun; Lee Hi

Special Awards

- Discovery of the Year: **Baechigi**
- Best Asian Artist: **Derrick Hoh**; **Thu Minh**; **Tor Saksit**; **SM*SH**; **Kyary Pamyu Pamyu**; **Aaron Kwok**
- Style in Music: **Sistar**
- Next Generation Global Star (Female): **Apink**
- Sony MDR Worldwide Performer: **Infinite**
- Best Concert Performer: **Lee Seung-chul**
- Music Makes One Global Ambassador Award: **Stevie Wonder**
- Red Carpet Special Prize: **Lee Jung-hyun**

== Multiple awards ==
=== Artist(s) with multiple wins ===
The following artist(s) received two or more wins (excluding the special awards):

Awards	Artist(s)
4	G-Dragon

=== Artist(s) with multiple nominations ===
The following artist(s) received three or more nominations (excluding the special awards):

Awards	Artist(s)
6	Cho Yong-pil
5	G-Dragon
5	Girls' Generation
5	Psy
4	EXO
3	Shinee
3	Crayon Pop
3	Lee Seung-chul
3	Busker Busker

== Broadcasts ==
Network	Country
Mnet	South Korea
KM	South Korea
tvN	South Korea
OnStyle	South Korea
O'Live	South Korea
Story On	South Korea
XTM	South Korea
TVB	Hong Kong
Myx (LIVE/Cable TV)	Philippines
Studio 23 (now ABS-CBN Sports+Action) (Delayed/Free TV)	Philippines
Mnet Japan	Japan
Mnet America	United States
Channel M (Southeast Asia)	Hong Kong, Taiwan, South East Asia
Channel U (Singapore)	Singapore
8TV (Malaysia)	Malaysia
Astro Maya HD	Malaysia
Astro Quan Jia HD	Malaysia
Fox	Finland
YOUKU	China
Indosiar	Indonesia
