= Seoul Music Awards =

Annual South Korean music awards

- Current: 35th Seoul Music Awards
- Awarded for: Excellence in music
- Country: South Korea
- Presented by: Sports Seoul
- First award: 1990
- Website: seoulmusicawards.com

Television/radio coverage
- Network: KBS N (2013–present); Niconico (2021); Idol Live TV (2022)

The Seoul Music Awards (Korean: 서울가요대상; RR: Seoul Gayo Daesang; SMA) is a major South Korean music awards show presented by the newspaper Sports Seoul. The award winners are selected based on a combination of criteria, including music sales, popular votes, and expert judges' opinions.

The annual ceremony was first held in 1990, when the Grand Prize was awarded to singer Byun Jin-sub. Boy group BTS is the most-awarded artist, having won 28 awards; they are also tied with Exo for the most Grand Prizes won, with four each.

== Categories ==
The Grand Prize (also known as the Daesang) is typically awarded to one musical act, with the exception of the 9th awards ceremony, when the Grand Prize was shared by H.O.T. and Sechs Kies, and the 10th awards ceremony, when it was shared by Jo Sung-mo and Fin.K.L. Additionally, at the 29th awards ceremony, two Grand Prizes were awarded: the Album Daesang, which went to BTS, and the Digital Daesang, which went to Taeyeon.

Main Prizes (also known as Bonsang) are given to several musical acts. The winner of the Popularity Award is determined by domestic viewers' votes, while the winner of the K-Wave Special Award is determined by overseas viewers' votes.

== Ceremonies ==
Edition	Year	Date of ceremony	City	Venue	Hosts	Ref.
7th	1996	December 5, 1996	Seoul	Universal Arts Center	Lee Gye-jin, Choi Young-joon	
8th	1997	December 4, 1997	Seoul	Universal Arts Center	Kim Seung-hyun, Kim Nam-joo	
9th	1998	December 18, 1998	Seoul	Universal Arts Center	Kim Seung-hyun, Kim Hyun-joo	
10th	1999	December 14, 1999	Seoul	KBS 88 Gymnasium	Yoo Jung-hyun, Lee Seung-yeon	
11th	2000	December 6, 2000	Seoul	Central City Millennium Hall	Yoo Jung-hyun, Kim So-yeon	
12th	2001	December 7, 2001	Seoul	Kyung Hee University	Yoo Jung-hyun, Kim Jung-eun	
13th	2002	December 6, 2002	Seoul	Kyung Hee University	Yoo Jung-hyun, Kim Jung-eun	
14th	2003	December 12, 2003	Seoul	Kyung Hee University	Yoo Jung-hyun, Sung Yu-ri	
15th	2004	December 10, 2004	Seoul	Kyung Hee University	Shin Dong-yup, Han Ji-hye	
16th	2006	December 1, 2006	Goyang	KINTEX	Nam Hee-suk, Park Jung-ah	
17th	2007	January 31, 2008	Jeongseon	Kangwon Land High1 Grand Hotel	Park Jung-ah, Kim Sung-joo	
18th	2008	February 12, 2009	Taebaek	Taebaek Gowon Gymnasium	Park Jung-ah, Jang Yoon-jeong, Shin Yeong-il	
19th	2009	February 3, 2010	Seoul	Olympic Fencing Gymnasium	Tak Jae-hoon, Uee	
20th	2010	January 20, 2011	Seoul	Kyung Hee University	Shin Dong-yup, Tak Jae-hoon, Yuri	
21st	2011	January 19, 2012	Seoul	Olympic Gymnastics Arena	Shin Hyun-joon, Tak Jae-hoon, Bae Suzy	
22nd	2012	January 31, 2013	Seoul	SK Olympic Handball Gymnasium	Tak Jae-hoon, Bae Suzy	
23rd	2013	January 23, 2014	Seoul	Jamsil Arena	Seo Kyung-seok, Eunhyuk, Jung Eun-ji	
24th	2014	January 22, 2015	Seoul	Olympic Gymnastics Arena	Jun Hyun-moo, Leeteuk, Soyou	
25th	2015	January 14, 2016	Seoul	Olympic Gymnastics Arena	Jun Hyun-moo, Lee Hanee, Hani	
26th	2016	January 19, 2017	Seoul	Jamsil Arena	Tak Jae-hoon, Kim Hee-chul, Jeon So-mi	
27th	2017	January 25, 2018	Seoul	Gocheok Sky Dome	Shin Dong-yup, Kim Hee-chul, Kim So-hyun	
28th	2018	January 15, 2019	Seoul	Gocheok Sky Dome	Shin Dong-yup, Kim Hee-chul, Kim So-hyun	
29th	2019	January 30, 2020	Seoul	Gocheok Sky Dome	Shin Dong-yup, Kim Hee-chul, Jo Bo-ah	
30th	2020	January 31, 2021	Seoul	Olympic Gymnastics Arena	Shin Dong-yup, Kim Hee-chul, Choi Soo-young	
31st	2021	January 23, 2022	Seoul	Gocheok Sky Dome	Kim Sung-joo, Boom, Kim Seol-hyun	
32nd	2022	January 19, 2023	Seoul	KSPO Dome	Kim Il-joong, Choi Min-ho, Mijoo	
33rd	2023	January 2, 2024	Bangkok	Rajamangala Stadium	Lee Seung-gi, Tiffany, BamBam, Youngjae	
34th	2025	June 21, 2025	Incheon	Inspire Arena	Kang Seung-yoon, Miyeon, Soobin	
35th	2026	June 20, 2026	Incheon	Inspire Arena	Leeteuk (Super Junior), Leesol (KiiiKiii), Park Gun-wook (Zerobaseone)	

== Grand Prize (Daesang) ==
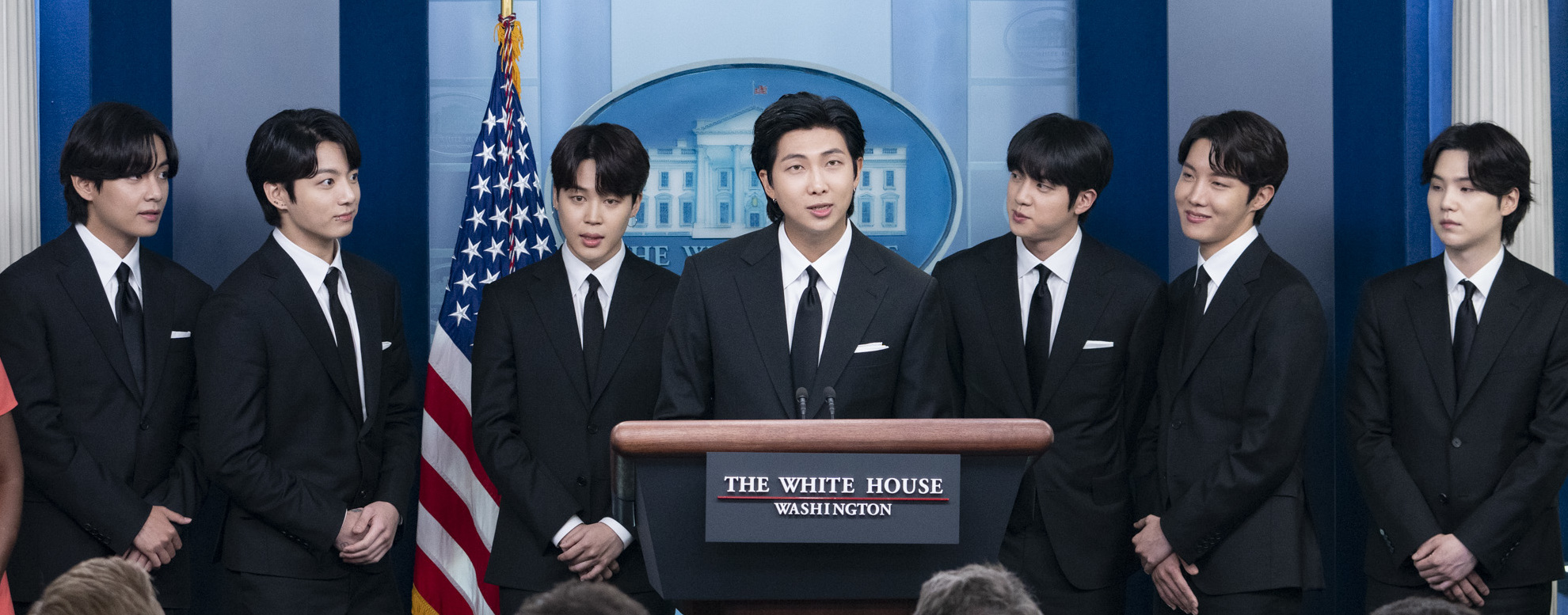
BTS has won 28 awards in total, the most of any artist.

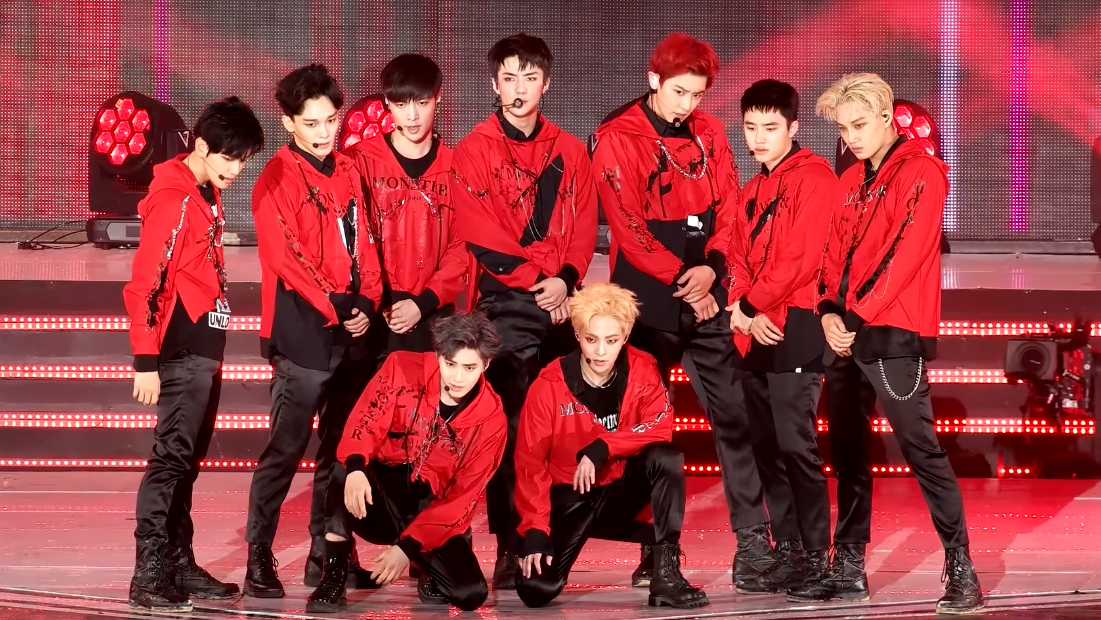
Exo is tied with BTS for the most Grand Prize wins, having won four each.

Year	Winners		Ref.
2026	Ateez	—N/a	
2025	I-dle	—N/a	
2023	NCT Dream	—N/a	
2022	NCT Dream	—N/a	
2021	NCT 127	—N/a	
2020	BTS	—N/a	
2019	BTS (Album)	Taeyeon (Digital)	
2018	BTS	—N/a	
2017	BTS	—N/a	
2016	Exo	—N/a	
2015	Exo	—N/a	
2014	Exo	—N/a	
2013	Exo	—N/a	
2012	Psy	—N/a	
2011	Super Junior	—N/a	
2010	Girls' Generation	—N/a	
2009	Girls' Generation	—N/a	
2008	Wonder Girls	—N/a	
2007	Big Bang	—N/a	
2006	TVXQ	—N/a	
2004	Shinhwa	—N/a	
2003	Lee Hyori	—N/a	
2002	BoA	—N/a	
2001	Kim Gun-mo	—N/a	
2000	Jo Sung-mo	—N/a	
1999	Jo Sung-mo	Fin.K.L	
1998	H.O.T.	Sechs Kies	
1997	H.O.T.	—N/a	
1996	Clon	—N/a	
1995	Roo'ra	—N/a	
1994	Kim Gun-mo	—N/a	
1993	Seo Taiji and Boys	—N/a	
1992	Seo Taiji and Boys	—N/a	
1991	Tae Jin-ah	—N/a	
1990	Byun Jin-sub	—N/a	

== Main Prize (Bonsang) ==
The list of winners are listed in alphanumeric order.

Year	Winners	Ref.
2026	Alpha Drive One; Ateez; BoyNextDoor; Dayoung; Hearts2Hearts; KiiiKiii; Kwon Eun-bi; Lee Chan-won; Le Sserafim; Zerobaseone	
2025	Aespa; Doyoung; Enhypen; G-Dragon; I-dle; Ive; NCT Dream; NCT Wish; P1Harmony; Plave; QWER; Rosé; Seventeen; Stray Kids; Tomorrow X Together; Young Tak; Zerobaseone	
2023	(G)I-dle; Aespa; Ive; Jimin; Jungkook; Zerobaseone; Kang Daniel; Lim Young-woong; NCT Dream; NewJeans; Nmixx; Riize; Seventeen; STAYC; Stray Kids; Sunmi; V; Young Tak	
2022	(G)I-dle; Aespa; Blackpink; BTS; Got the Beat; Ive; Kang Daniel; Kim Ho-joong; Lim Young-woong; NCT Dream; Psy; Red Velvet; Seventeen; Stray Kids; Taeyeon; Zico	
2021	Aespa; ATEEZ; Brave Girls; BTS; Enhypen; Heize; IU; Kang Daniel; Lim Young-woong; NCT 127; Oh My Girl; Seventeen; The Boyz	
2020	ATEEZ; BTS; Iz*One; Kang Daniel; Monsta X; NCT 127; NU'EST; Oh My Girl; Seventeen; Stray Kids; TXT; Twice	
2019	BTS; Chungha; Exo; Mamamoo; Monsta X; NCT Dream; NU'EST; Paul Kim; Red Velvet; Super Junior; Taeyeon; Twice	
2018	BTS; Exo; iKon; NCT 127; Mamamoo; Momoland; Monsta X; NU'EST W; Red Velvet; Seventeen; Twice; Wanna One	
2017	Blackpink; Bolbbalgan4; BtoB; BTS; Exo; Got7; NU'EST W; Red Velvet; Seventeen; Super Junior; Twice; Wanna One	
2016	BTS; Exo; GFriend; Got7; Mamamoo; Red Velvet; Sechs Kies; Seventeen; Taeyeon; Twice; VIXX; Zico	
2015	Apink; Big Bang; BTS; EXID; Exo; Red Velvet; Shinee; Sistar; Taeyeon; VIXX; Yoon Mi-rae; Zion.T	
2014	Apink; AOA; B1A4; Beast; BTS; Exo; Girl's Day; Girls' Generation-TTS; Infinite; Sistar; Super Junior; VIXX	
2013	4Minute; Apink; B1A4; B.A.P; Beast; Cho Yong-pil; Exo; Girls' Generation; Infinite; Shinee; Sistar; VIXX	
2012	2NE1; Big Bang; Super Junior; Epik High; f(x); Huh Gak; Lee Seung-gi; Miss A; Psy; Secret; Shinee; Sistar	
2011	4Minute; Beast; FT Island; Girls' Generation; IU; Kara; Lee Seung-gi; Miss A; Secret; Sistar; Super Junior; T-ara	
2010	2AM; 4Minute; Beast; FT Island; Girls' Generation; IU; Miss A; Secret; Shinee; Son Dam-bi	

List of winners (1990–2009)

Edition	Year	Winners	Ref.
19th	2009	2PM; Baek Ji-young; Brown Eyed Girls; Davichi; Girls' Generation; Kara; Kim Tae-woo; Shinee; Son Dam-bi; Super Junior	
18th	2008	Baek Ji-young; Big Bang; Brown Eyed Girls; Jang Yoon-jeong; Kim Jong-kook; SG Wannabe; Son Dam-bi; SS501; TVXQ; Wonder Girls	
17th	2007	Baek Ji-young; Big Bang; Epik High; Eru; Jang Yoon-jeong; MC the Max; SeeYa; SG Wannabe; Super Junior; V.O.S	
16th	2006	Baek Ji-young; Jang Yoon-jeong; MC Mong; Park Jung-ah; SG Wannabe; Shin Seung-hun; Son Hoyoung; Turtles; TVXQ; Vibe	
15th	2004	Cho PD; Kim Jong-kook; Koyote; Lee Seung-chul; Lee Soo-young; Park Hyo-shin; Rain; Shinhwa; Shin Seung-hun; TVXQ	
14th	2003	Baby V.O.X; Fly to the Sky; Jewelry; Lee Hyori; Rain; Koyote; Shinhwa; Wax; Wheesung; Yoon Do Hyun Band	
13th	2002	BoA; Cool; Jang Na-ra; Koyote; Lee Soo-young; Park Hyo-shin; Shinhwa; Sung Si-kyung; Yoon Do Hyun Band; Wax	
12th	2001	Fin.K.L; g.o.d; Im Chang-jung; Kangta; Kim Gun-mo; Lee Jung-hyun; Park Ji-yoon; Steve Seungjun Yoo; Shin Seung-hun; Tae Jin-ah; Uhm Jung-hwa; Wax	
11th	2000	Fin.K.L; g.o.d; Im Chang-jung; Jo Sungmo; Lee Jung-hyun; Park Ji-yoon; Steve Seungjun Yoo; Shin Seung-hun; Tae Jin-ah; Uhm Jung-hwa	
10th	1999	Baby V.O.X; Clon; Country Kko Kko; Fin.K.L; H.O.T; Im Chang-jung; Jo Sungmo; Kim Gun-mo; Sechs Kies; Song Dae-kwan; Uhm Jung-hwa	
9th	1998	Fin.K.L; H.O.T; Kim Gun-mo; Kim Jong-hwan; Kim Kyung-ho; Sechs Kies; S.E.S.; Song Dae-kwan; Turbo; Uhm Jung-hwa	
8th	1997	DJ Doc; H.O.T; Jinusean; Kim Kyung-ho; Im Chang-jung; Park Jin-young; Sechs Kies; Turbo; Uhm Jung-hwa; UP	
7th	1996	Clon; Green Area; Hoon; Insooni; Kim Gun-mo; Kim Won-jun; Kim Jung-min; Park Mi-kyung; R.ef; Turbo	
6th	1995	DJ Doc; Kim Gun-mo; Noise; Park Jin-young; Park Mi-kyung; R.ef; Seo Taiji and Boys; Shin Hyo-beom; Solid	
5th	1994	Boohwal; Choi Yoo-na; Kim Gun-mo; Lim Ju-ri; Roo'ra; Seol Woon-do; Shin Seong-woo; Shin Seung-hun; Two Two	
4th	1993	Choi Yoo-na; Kim Gun-mo; Kim Jeong-soo; Kim So-hee; Kim Won-jun; Lee Mu-song; Seo Taiji and Boys; Shin Hyo-beom; Shin Seung-hun	
3rd	1992	Kang Susie; Kim Kook-hwan; Lee Sang-woo; Lee Seung-hwan; Min Hae-kyung; Shin Seung-hun; Yang Soo-kyung	
2nd	1991	Kang Susie; Kim Jeong-soo; Kim Ji-ae; Kim Wan-sun; Lee Sang-woo; Noh Sa-yeon; Tae Jin-ah	
1st	1990	Byun Jin-sub; Hyun Chul; Joo Hyun-mi; Kim Ji-ae; Min Hae-kyung; Na-mi	

== Rookie of the Year ==
Year	Winners					Ref.
2026	AHOF	Alpha Drive One	Close Your Eyes	IDID		
2025	Hearts2Hearts	KickFlip	KiiiKiii	—N/a		
2023	Riize	Zerobaseone		—N/a		
2022	Le Sserafim	NewJeans	TNX	—N/a		
2021	Lee Mu-Jin	Epex	Omega X	—N/a		
2020	Treasure	Aespa	Enhypen	—N/a		
2019	TXT	AB6IX	Itzy	—N/a		
2018	Stray Kids	Iz*One		—N/a		
2017	Pristin	Chungha	Wanna One	—N/a		
2016	NCT 127	I.O.I	Blackpink	—N/a		
2015	Seventeen	GFriend	iKon	—N/a		
2014	Got7	Eddy Kim	Red Velvet	—N/a		
2013	BTS	Lim Kim	Crayon Pop	—N/a		
2012	Exo	Ailee	B.A.P	Lee Hi		
2011	B1A4	Apink	Boyfriend	—N/a		
2010	The Boss	Sistar	CNBLUE	—N/a		
2009	Beast	T-ara	After School	—N/a		
2008	Davichi	Mighty Mouth	Shinee	—N/a		
2007	F.T. Island	Girls' Generation	Wonder Girls	—N/a		
2006	Super Junior	SeeYa	Brown Eyed Girls	—N/a		
2004	TVXQ	Lee Seung-gi	SG Wannabe	—N/a		
2003	Maya	Se7en	Big Mama	—N/a		
2002	Rizi	Rain	Wheesung	—N/a		
2001	Brown Eyes	Sung Si-kyung	Jadu	Morning Bond	To-ya	
2000	Park Hwayobi	J.ae	—N/a			
1999	Lee Jung-hyun	Koyote	Sharp	Chae Jung-an		
1998	NRG	Jo Sungmo	Kim Hyun-jung	Yoo Ri		
1997	Lee Ji-hoon	Yangpa	—N/a			
1996	Young Turks Club		—N/a			
1995	Sung Jin-woo	Yook Gak-soo	—N/a			
1994	Go Bon-seung		—N/a			
1993	Choi Yeon-je		—N/a			
1992	Lee Deok-jin	Seo Taiji and Boys	—N/a			
1991	Shim Shin	Shin Seung-hun	—N/a			
1990	Kim Min-woo	Shin Hae-chul	—N/a			

== Best Album ==
Year	Winner		Ref.
Year	Artist	Album	Ref.
2026	BoyNextDoor		
2026	Zerobaseone		
2025	Tomorrow X Together	Minisode 3: Tomorrow	
2025	Zerobaseone	Blue Paradise	
2023	Seventeen	FML	
2022	BTS	Proof	
2021	NCT Dream	Hot Sauce	
2020	BTS	Map of the Soul: 7	
2018	BTS	Love Yourself: Tear	
2017	IU	Palette	
2016	BTS	Wings	
2015	BoA	Kiss My Lips	
2014	Beast	Time	
2013	Cho Yong-pil	Hello	
2012	G-Dragon	One of A Kind	
2011	IU	Last Fantasy	
2010	Psy	PsyFive	
2009	Drunken Tiger	Feel gHood Muzik : The 8th Wonder	
2008	Big Bang	Remember	
2007	Epik High	Remapping the Human Soul	

== Best Song ==
Year	Winner		Ref.
Year	Artist	Title song	Ref.
2026	Le Sserafim	"Spaghetti" (featuring J-Hope)	
2025	Tomorrow X Together	"Deja Vu"	
2023	NewJeans	"OMG"	
2022	Ive	"Love Dive"	
2021	IU	"Lilac"	
2020	BTS	"Dynamite"	
2018	iKon	"Love Scenario"	
2017	Yoon Jong-shin	"Like It"	
2016	Twice	"Cheer Up"	
2015	Big Bang	"Bang Bang Bang"	
2014	Soyou & Junggigo	"Some"	
2013	Exo	"Growl"	
2012	Sistar	"Alone"	
2011	T-ara	"Roly Poly"	
2010	IU	"Good Day"	
2009	Girls' Generation	"Gee"	
2008	Wonder Girls	"Nobody"	
2007	Big Bang	"Lies"	

== Best Solo ==
Year	Winner	Ref.
2026	Dayoung	
2025	Doyoung	

== Best Group ==
Year	Winner		Ref.
2026	Zerobasone		
2025	Illit	NCT Wish	

== K-Pop World Choice ==
Year	Group	Solo	Ref.
2026	Super Junior	Yeonjun	
2025	Babymonster	Young Tak	

== World Best Artist Award ==
Year	Winner		Ref.
2026	BoyNextDoor	Le Sserafim	
2025	Aespa	Rosé	
2023	Blackpink		
2022	PSY		
2021	BTS		

== Genre-specific awards ==
=== R&B Hip-Hop Award ===
Year	Award name	Winner		Ref.
2026	R&B Hip-Hop Award	BoyNextDoor		
2025	R&B Hip-Hop Award	RM		
2023	R&B Hip-Hop Award	Dynamic Duo		
2022	R&B Hip-Hop Award	Be'O	Big Naughty	
2021	R&B Hip-Hop Award	Hyuna		
2020	R&B Hip-Hop Award	Jessi		
2019	R&B Hip-Hop Award	Kassy		
2018	R&B Hip-Hop Award	Drunken Tiger		
2017	R&B Soul Award	Suran		
2016	Hip-Hop Award	MOBB		
2015	R&B Hip-Hop Award	San E		
2015	Hip-Hop Award	San E		
2014	Hip-Hop Award	San E & Raina		
2013	Hip-Hop Award	Dynamic Duo		
2012	Hip-Hop Award	Double K		
2011	Hip-Hop Award	Clover		
2010	Hip-Hop Award	Supreme Team		
2009	Hip-Hop Award	Drunken Tiger		
2004	Hip-Hop Award	Bobby Kim		
2002	Hip-Hop Award	YG Family		
2002	R&B Award	Lena Park		
2001	Hip-Hop Award	Drunken Tiger		

=== Ballad Award ===
Year	Award name	Winner	Ref.
2026	Rock/Ballad Award	Hanroro	
2025	Ballad Award	Hwang Karam	
2023	Ballad Award	Young K	
2022	Ballad Award	Younha	
2021	Ballad Award	Wendy	
2020	Ballad Award	Sandeul	
2019	Ballad Award	Kim Jae-hwan	
2018	Ballad Award	Im Chang-jung	
2016	Ballad Award	Baek A-yeon	
2015	Ballad Award	BtoB	
2014	R&B Ballad Award	K.Will	
2013	R&B Ballad Award	K.Will	
2012	R&B Ballad Award	K.Will	
2011	R&B Ballad Award	4Men	
2010	R&B Ballad Award	2AM	
2009	R&B Ballad Award	Bobby Kim	

=== Trot Award ===
Year	Winner	Ref.
2026	Lee Chan-won	
2025	Young Tak	
2023	Young Tak	
2022	Young Tak	
2021	Lim Young-woong	
2020	Lim Young-woong	
2019	Song Ga-in	
2016	Tae Jin-ah	
2015	Hong Jin-young	
2010	Jang Yoon-jeong	
2009	Park Hyun-bin	
2009	Park Sang-chul	
2008	Park Hyun-bin	
2007	Park Hyun-bin	
2006	Park Sang-chul, Park Hyun-bin, Song Dae-kwan, Tae Jin-ah, Hyun Suk, Kim Yong-im	
2004	Jang Yoon-jeong	
2002	Tae Jin-ah	
2001	Tae Jin-ah, Hyun Suk	
1999	Choi Yu-na, Tae Jin-ah	
1998	Choi Yu-na	

== Performance Award ==
Year	Winners		Ref.
2026	Izna	Xikers	
2025	Cravity	Fifty Fifty	
2023	Billlie	—N/a	
2022	(G)I-DLE	—N/a	
2021	STAYC	Enhypen	
2020	(G)I-DLE	The Boyz	
2019	Ha Sung-woon	—N/a	
2018	GFriend	—N/a	
2017	NCT 127	Mamamoo	
2016	BTS	Twice	
2015	Monsta X	Ailee	
2014	Hyuna	—N/a	

== Original Soundtrack Award ==
Year	Winner	Song	Drama	Ref.
2026	Sung Han-bin	"You Are Spring"	Spring Fever OST	
2025	Young Tak	"Unpredictable Life"	For Eagle Brothers OST	
2023	Baekhyun	"Hello"	Dr. Romantic 3 OST	
2022	MeloMance	"Love, Maybe"	Business Proposal OST	
2021	Lim Young-woong	"Love Always Run Away"	Young Lady and Gentleman OST	
2020	Jo Jung-suk	"Aloha"	Hospital Playlist OST	
2019	Taeyeon	"All About You"	Hotel del Luna OST	
2017	Ailee	"I Will Go to You Like the First Snow"	Goblin OST	
2016	Gummy	"You Are My Everything"	Descendants of the Sun OST	
2015	Jang Jae-in	"Hallucination"	Kill Me, Heal Me OST	
2014	Lyn	"My Destiny"	My Love from the Star OST	
2013	The One	"Winter Love"	That Winter, the Wind Blows OST	
2012	Lee Jong-hyun	"My Love"	A Gentleman's Dignity OST	
2011	Baek Ji-young	"That Woman"	Secret Garden OST	
2006	Sweet Sorrow	"No matter how I think about it"	Alone in Love OST	
2004	Jo Sung-mo	"By Your Side"	Lovers in Paris OST	
2003	SBS Drama 'Strike'	—N/a		
2002	Kang Seong	—N/a		
2001	Kim Tae-jeong	—N/a		

== Band Award ==
Year	Winners	Ref.
2026	Dragon Pony	
2025	Wave to Earth	
2023	Xdinary Heroes	
2023	Jannabi	
2020	Leenalchi	
2019	Daybreak	
2018	Crying Nut	
2017	iamnot	
2016	Kiha & The Faces	

== Popularity Award ==
Year	Winners		Ref.
2026	Lee Chan-won		
2025	Lee Chan-won		
2023	Kim Ho-joong		
2022	Lim Young-woong		
2021	Lim Young-woong		
2020	Lim Young-woong		
2019	Exo		
2018	Shinee		
2017	Taemin		
2016	Shinee		
2015	XIA		
2014	Taemin		
2013	Shinee	B1A4	
2012	Lee Seung-gi	Shinee	
2011	Girls' Generation	Lee Seung-gi	
2010	Shinee	Girls' Generation	
2009	2PM	Super Junior	
2008	Big Bang	TVXQ	
2007	Super Junior		
2006	Super Junior	TVXQ	
2004	Shinhwa	TVXQ	
2001	Click-B	Baby V.O.X.	
2000	SKY	Click-B	

== K-wave Special Award ==
Year	Winners	Ref.
2026	BTS	
2025	Jimin	
2023	Kim Ho-joong	
2022	Suho	
2021	Exo	
2020	BTS	
2019	Exo	
2018	Exo	
2017	Exo	
2016	Astro	
2015	Exo	
2014	Infinite	
2013	Shinee	
2012	Super Junior	
2011	Kara	
2010	Girls' Generation	
2009	Super Junior	
2008	SS501	
2009	Paran	
2006	Kangta & Vanness	
2004	Baby V.O.X.	
2004	Park Yong-ha	
2003	S	
2002	Baby V.O.X.	
2001	Kim Hyun-jung	

== Discovery of the Year Award ==
Year	Winners	Ref.
2025	Say My Name	
2023	Fifty Fifty	
2022	Lee Seung-yoon	
2021	Lang Lee	
2020	Itzy	
2019	Kim Hyun-chul	
2018	Yang Da-il	
2017	Monsta X	
2016	WJSN	
2016	Han Dong-geun	

== SMA Global Rookie Award ==
Year	Winners	Ref.
2026	Idntt, Modyssey, Say My Name	

== Special awards ==
Year	Award	Winners	Ref.
2026	The New Icon Award	Doh Kyung-soo	
2026	The Golden Revival Award	EXO	
2026	Legend Award	Roo'ra	
2023	K-pop Special Award	Sandara Park	
2023	World Trend Artist	BTS	
2022	Legend Artist	BoA	
2022	K-pop Special Award	Kara	
2022	idol+ Best Artist Award	BTS	
2021	Judge Special Award	Jung Dong-ha	
2021	U+Idol Live Best Artist Award	BTS	
2020	Fan PD Artist Award	Kang Daniel	
2020	WhosFandom Award	BTS	
2020	Legend Rookie Award (Note: The Legend Rookie Prize was a one-off category created in celebration of the 30th anniversary of the Seoul Music Awards. A special online poll was held via the SMA website where fans voted for the most memorable rookie artist in the award show's history. The candidate with the most votes was announced at the end of the ceremony on January 31. No physical award was presented to the winner.)	iKon	
2020	Legend Award (Note: The Legend Grand Prize was a one-off category created in celebration of the Seoul Music Awards 30th anniversary. A special online poll was held via the SMA website where fans voted for the most memorable Daesang winner in the award show's history. The candidate with the most votes was announced at the end of the ceremony on January 31. No physical award was presented to the winner.)	Big Bang	
2019	Judge Special Award	Song Ga-in	
2019	QQ Music Popularity Award	Exo	
2018	Judge Special Award	Adoy	
2018	Fandom School Award	Wanna One	
2017	Judge Special Award	Bom Yeoreum Gaeul Kyeoul	
2017	Fandom School Award	Exo	
2016	World Collaboration Award	Punch X Silentó	
2016	Fandom School Award	Exo	
2014	iQiyi Award	Exo	
2008	YTN Star Award	Baek Ji-young	
2008	High1 Music Award	Big Bang	
2007	High1 Music Award	Girls' Generation	
2006	Lifetime Achievement Award	Kim Jong-hwan, Can	
2004	Lifetime Achievement Award	Seol Un-do, JNC	
2004	Live Award	Hwang Gyu-hak	
2003	Lifetime Achievement Award	Seol Un-do	
2003	Judge Special Award	Baek Ji-young	
2003	Live Award	Cho Yong-pil	
2002	Lifetime Achievement Award	Lee Moon-sae	
2002	World Cup Achievement Award	YB, Yoon Tae-won	
2000	Special Award	Kim Kyung-ho, Kim Jong-hwan, Uhm Jung-hwa, Jung Il-yeong	
1997	Special Award	Seol Un-do	
1994	Special Award	Lee Ae-suk	
1991	Fashion Award	Kim Wan-sun	

== Discontinued awards ==
List of discontinued awards

=== Rock Award ===
Edition	Year	Winner	Ref.
15th	2004	Jaurim	
13th	2002	Cherry Filter	
12th	2001	Kim Jong-seo	

=== Folk Award ===
Edition	Year	Winner	Ref.
14th	2003	Park Gang-seong	
13th	2002	Yurisangja	
12th	2001	Park Gang-seong	

=== Music Video Award ===
Edition	Year	Winner	Ref.
26th	2016	BTS	
15th	2004	Kim Tae-uk	
14th	2003	Cha Eun-taek	
13th	2002	Jang Jae-hyeok	
12th	2001	Cha Eun-taek	
11th	2000	Kim Se-hun	
10th	1999	Hong Jong-ho	
9th	1998	Kim Se-hun	

=== Show & Culture Award ===
Edition	Year	Winners	Ref.
25th	2015	Hyukoh	
24th	2014	Im Chang-jung	
23rd	2013	Lee Seung-chul	
22nd	2012	Kim Jang-hoon	
21st	2011	YB	
20th	2010	Bobby Kim	
19th	2009	Psy	
18th	2008	Kim Jang-hoon	

=== Non-performer awards ===
==== Directing Award ====
Edition	Year	Winners	Ref.
27th	2017	Bang Si-hyuk	
26th	2016	Lee Dong-suk	

==== Producer Award ====
Edition	Year	Winners	Ref.
16th	2005	Kim Gwang-su, Hong Ik-seon	
15th	2004	Jeong Won-gwan	
14th	2003	Yang Hyun-suk	
13th	2002	Park Geun-tae, Kim Tae-yeon	
12th	2001	Choi Jin-young	

==== Composition Award ====
Edition	Year	Winners	Ref.
16th	2006	Cho Yeong-su	
15th	2004	Yoon Myeong-seon	
14th	2003	Park Geun-tae	
13th	2002	Lim Gi-hun	
12th	2001	Park Jin-young	
11th	2000	Lee Gyeong-seop	
10th	1999	Choi Jun-yeong	
9th	1998	Choi Jun-yeong	
8th	1997	Lee Gyeong-seop	
7th	1996	Choi Jun-yeong	
6th	1995	Kim Chang-hwan	
5th	1994	Kim Chang-hwan	
4th	1993	Seo Taiji	
3rd	1992	Kim Gi-pyo	
2nd	1991	Yoon Sang	
1st	1990	Ha Gwang-hun	

==== Lyricist Award ====
Edition	Year	Winners	Ref.
15th	2004	Psy	
14th	2003	Park Gyeong-jin	
13th	2002	Shim Hyeon-bo	
12th	2001	Han Gyeong-hye	
11th	2000	Chae Jeong-eun	
10th	1999	Jang Dae-seong	
9th	1998	Kim Jong-hwan	
7th	1996	Yoon Seong-hee	
6th	1995	Lee Gun-woo	
4th	1993	Yu Yeong-geon	
3rd	1992	Yang In-ja	
2nd	1991	Park Ju-yeon	
1st	1990	No Young-shim	

==== Arrangement Award ====
Edition	Year	Winners	Ref.
8th	1997	Park Jin-young	
7th	1996	Kim Woo-jin	
6th	1995	Kim Hyeon-cheol	
5th	1994	Kim Hyeong-seok	
4th	1993	Bang Gi-nam	
3rd	1992	Song Heung-seop	
2nd	1991	Kim Gi-pyo	

==== Planning Award ====
Edition	Year	Winners	Ref.
15th	2004	Lee Do-hyeong	
13th	2002	Lee Do-hyeong	
12th	2001	Kim Gwang-su	
11th	2000	Kim Gwang-su	
10th	1999	Lee Hyo-yeon, Han Seok-chang	
9th	1998	Park Nam-seong	
7th	1996	Sa Maeng-seok	
6th	1995	Sa Maeng-seok	
5th	1994	Sa Maeng-seok	
4th	1993	Kim Jeong-ja	
3rd	1992	Choi Sung-hun	
2nd	1991	Sa Maeng-seok	
1st	1990	Kim Gwang-su	

==== Stylist Award ====
Edition	Year	Winners	Ref.
15th	2004	Kim Su-jin	
14th	2003	Sung Mun-seok	
13th	2002	Jeong Bo-yun	
12th	2001	Lee Hye-yeong	

== Most wins ==
The following artist(s) arranged in alphanumeric order has received five or more awards:

Count	Artist
28	BTS
24	Exo
14	Super Junior
12	Girls' Generation; Shinee
11	Big Bang
9	Seventeen; Lim Young-woong
8	TVXQ
7	IU; Sistar; Twice; Red Velvet
6	Beast; NCT 127; Taeyeon; NCT Dream
5	Monsta X; Kang Daniel; Tomorrow X Together; Stray Kids
