= Hunter Street (TV series) =

Dutch comedy adventure television series

- Season 1 cast of Hunter Street
- Genre: Comedy; Adventure; Mystery
- Created by: Reint Schölvinck; Melle Runderkamp
- Written by: Reint Schölvinck; Melle Runderkamp; Anne-Louise Verboon; Pauline Van Mantgem; Pasja Van Dam; Elle Van Rijn; Willem Bosch; Nienke Römer; Wolter Muller; Judith Goudsmit; Michel Bonset; Jeroen van der Zee; Elisabeth Lodeizen; Marije Willemsen; Paul de Vrijer; Diane Whitley; Mark Oswin; Emma Nisbet; Tony Cooke; Danny Spring; Julia Kent
- Directed by: Erwin Van Den Eshof; Hans Somers; Bob Wilbers; Jonathan Elbers
- Starring: Stony Blyden; Mae Mae Renfrow; Kyra Smith; Thomas Jansen; Daan Creyghton; Wilson Radjou-Pujalte; Kate Bensdorp; Eliyha Altena; Sarah Nauta
- Ending theme: Stony Blyden
- Composer: Ronald Schilperoort
- Country of origin: Netherlands
- Original language: English
- No. of seasons: 4
- No. of episodes: 90 (list of episodes)

Production
- Producers: Rogier Visser; Willem Zijlstra; Frank Jan Horst
- Camera setup: Single-camera
- Running time: 22 minutes
- Production companies: Blooming Media; Nickelodeon Productions

Original release
- Network: Nickelodeon
- Release: March 11, 2017 – February 23, 2018
- Network: TeenNick
- Release: July 29 – September 27, 2019
- Network: Nickelodeon UK
- Release: April 19 – May 20, 2021

Hunter Street is a Dutch comedy adventure mystery television series created by Reint Schölvinck and Melle Runderkamp that aired on Nickelodeon from March 11, 2017 to February 23, 2018, then moved to TeenNick from July 29 to September 27, 2019 and finally to Nickelodeon UK from April 19, 2021 to May 20, 2021. Based on the 2016–2019 Dutch television series The Ludwigs. The series stars Stony Blyden, Mae Mae Renfrow, Kyra Smith, Thomas Jansen, and Daan Creyghton as a group of five foster children who must solve a mystery in order to find their missing foster parents. Wilson Radjou-Pujalte and Kate Bensdorp join the cast in the series' second season, and Eliyha Altena and Sarah Nauta join the cast in the series' third season. The fourth season did not premiere in the United States, airing in the United Kingdom from April 19 to May 20, 2021.

== Premise ==
Five foster children in Amsterdam attempt to find out what happened to their missing foster parents.

== Episodes ==
Season	Episodes	Originally released		
Season	Episodes	First released	Last released	Network
1	20	March 11, 2017	April 7, 2017	Nickelodeon
2	20	January 29, 2018	February 23, 2018	Nickelodeon
3	30	July 29, 2019	September 27, 2019	TeenNick
4	20	April 19, 2021 (UK)	May 20, 2021 (UK)	Nickelodeon UK

== Cast ==
=== Main ===
- Stony Blyden as Max (seasons 1–2)
- Mae Mae Renfrow as Tess (seasons 1–2)
- Kyra Smith as Anika
- Thomas Jansen as Daniel (seasons 1–2; recurring, season 4)
- Daan Creyghton as Sal (seasons 1–3)
- Wilson Radjou-Pujalte as Jake (season 2; recurring, season 3)
- Kate Bensdorp as Evie (seasons 2–4)
- Eliyha Altena as Oliver (seasons 3–4)
- Sarah Nauta as Jasmyn (season 3; recurring, season 4)

=== Recurring ===
- Ronald Top as Erik Hunter
- Tooske Ragas as Kate Hunter
- Yootha Wong-Loi-Sing as Simone (seasons 1–2)
- Zoë Harding as Sophie (seasons 1–2)
- Barnaby Savage as Tim (seasons 1–2)
- Kees Hulst as Rinus Saganash (seasons 1–2)
- Tillman Galloway as Mr. "Magpie" Browning (seasons 1–3)
- Dawn Mastin as Gertrude (seasons 1–2)
- Liora Kats as Janine Bruhl (seasons 1)
- Eva Van Der Gucht as Headmistress Clutterbeek (seasons 1–2)
- Amedeo Feingold as Julius Bruhl (season 1)
- Debra Mulholland as Hedwig Hunter (season 1)
- Alyssa Guerrouche as Jennie (seasons 2, 4)
- Mark Wijsman as Jerry (season 2)
- Loveday Smith as Diane (seasons 2–4)
- Michael de Roos as Simon (season 2, 4)
- Bonnie Williams as Lucia Jansen (season 2)
- Kenneth Darryll Charles as Martin (season 2)
- Kenan Raven as Bernard (season 2)
- Cystine Carreon as Dottie (seasons 3–4)
- Thomas Cammaert as Markus (seasons 3–4)
- Edwin Jonker as Lyman (season 3)
- Charlie May as Rex Legend (season 3)
- Meriyem Manders as Officer Smith (season 3)
- Padraig Turley as Florian (season 4)
- Reiky de Valk as Josh (season 4)
- Mimi Ferrer as Miss Lucas (season 4)
- Max Van Kreij as Mr. Simmons (season 4)
- Myrthe Burger as Isabelle Jackson (season 4)
- Jakob Nieuwenhuijsen as Alex Jackson (season 4)

== Production ==
The series is produced in the Netherlands by Blooming Media, and was co-developed with the Nickelodeon Netherlands television series De Ludwigs. Nickelodeon made it known that the series' first season would contain 20 episodes on March 2, 2017. The series was renewed for a second season of 20 episodes on April 25, 2017. On July 27, 2018, the series was renewed for a third season of 30 episodes. On May 12, 2019, it was announced that the third season would premiere on Nickelodeon on July 22, 2019, but the third season later premiered on TeenNick on July 29, 2019.

== Release ==
On June 25, 2018, it was announced that Hunter Street would stream on Hulu.

== Ratings ==
Viewership and ratings per season of Hunter Street
Season	Network	Episodes	First aired		Last aired		Avg. viewers (millions)
Season	Network	Episodes	Date	Viewers (millions)	Date	Viewers (millions)	Avg. viewers (millions)
1	Nickelodeon	20	March 11, 2017	1.82	April 7, 2017	1.55	1.32
2	Nickelodeon	20	January 29, 2018	0.81	February 23, 2018	0.89	0.96
3	TeenNick	26	July 29, 2019	0.11	September 27, 2019	0.16	0.10
