= Kindling (2023 film) =

British film

- Directed by: Connor O'Hara
- Written by: Connor O'Hara
- Based on: Infinite (2016) by Connor O'Hara
- Produced by: Jamie Gamache; Mark Foligno
- Cinematography: David Wright
- Edited by: Sarah Peczek
- Music by: Harry Brokensha
- Production companies: Lowkey Films; Haymarket Films; Lipsync Productions; Hyprr Films
- Distributed by: Signature Entertainment
- Release dates: 25 March 2023 (Cleveland); 21 April 2023 (United Kingdom)
- Running time: 93 minutes
- Country: United Kingdom
- Language: English

Kindling is a 2023 British drama film written and directed by Connor O'Hara in his feature debut, based on his short film Infinite (2016).

== Plot ==
A group of young men return to their hometown to turn their friend Sid's final summer into a celebration of life and friendship. Facing mortality, Sid wants to create a legacy and be remembered forever. With his obsession for astronomy and the atmosphere, he comes up with a plan to bring everyone together and make this summer unforgettable. He gives each boy a category - love, home, friends, family and location - and asks them to find an item that connects them all with the word they've been given. That week they'll build a fire to burn the items they collect, a ritual that Sid believes will make him last forever.

== Cast ==
- George Somner as Sid
- Conrad Khan as Dribble
- Wilson Mbomio as Diggs
- Mia McKenna-Bruce as Lily
- Rory J. Saper as Plod
- Kaine Zajaz as Wolfie
- Geoff Bell as Sid's Dad
- Tara Fitzgerald as Sid's Mum
- Hattie Gotobed as Mia
- Ocean Navarro as Jess

== Production ==
In 2016, Lowkey Films released a short film Infinite by Connor O'Hara, which starred George Mackay, Elliot James Langridge, Rose Williams, and Alexander Lincoln. Infinite provided the proof of concept for Kindling, which is semi-autobiographical based on O'Hara's personal experience of losing two friends when he was 21. In the late stages of postproduction on Kindling, he lost another friend, the real life Plod. The film is dedicated "to those we've loved and lost".

O'Hara and producer Jamie Gamache spent a number of years financing the project, with Haymarket Films boarding the project in February 2020. Also producing the film was Mark Foligno of Lipsync Productions, while executive producers included Andrew and Terry Loveday of Haymarket Films, Norman Merry and Peter Hampden of Lipsync, and Rachel Warren and Carl Shepherd of Hyprr Films. Pre-production was placed on hold in 2020 due to the COVID-19 pandemic.

In August 2021, it was announced George Somner, Conrad Khan, and Wilson Mbomio would star in the film alongside Mia McKenna-Bruce, Rory J. Saper, Kaine Zajaz, Geoff Bell, and Tara Fitzgerald.

Principal photography took place on location in August and September 2021. Suffolk filming locations including Stansfield, Hawkedon, and Chevington, while Essex filming locations included Colchester, Wivenhoe, Dedham, Langham, and Boxted.

== Release ==
Carnaby International boarded as sales agent in May 2022. In November 2022, the film secured an April 2023 theatrical release from Signature Entertainment in the UK and Ireland. Kindling had its world premiere at the Cleveland International Film Festival and also screened at the Phoenix Film Festival in March. It became the first British film in six years to feature in the Competition lineup at the Shanghai International Film Festival in May. In July 2023, the BBC acquired a license to broadcast the film.

== Reception ==
Cath Clarke of The Guardian gave Kindling three stars out of five, describing the film as having a "lovely natural, unforced quality" to it. She also called Somner's "understated, observant performance" "terrific". Christos Makropoulos of Blaze Radio praised the character writing as well as the cast, highlighting Somner and Mbomio's performances in particular. Kindling appeared on the May 2023 Glamour UK list of the Best British films of the year so far.
