= Cho Yong-pil =

South Korean singer (born 1950)

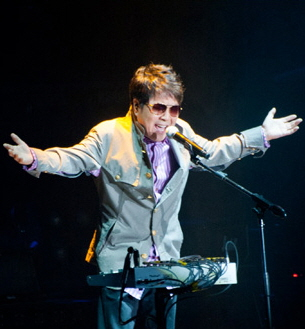
- Cho in April 2013
- Born: March 21, 1950 (age 76); Hwaseong, South Korea
- Occupations: Singer; songwriter
- Years active: 1968–present
- Spouse: An Jin-hyeon (died 2003)
- Awards: Eungwan Order of Cultural Merit (2013)
- Musical career
- Genres: K-pop; folk-pop; trot; rock; ballad
- Instruments: Vocals; guitar
- Labels: Jigu Record; Pil Records; Universal Music

Korean name
- Hangul: 조용필
- Hanja: 趙容弼
- RR: Jo Yongpil
- MR: Cho Yongp'il
- Website: choyongpil.com

Cho Yong-pil (Korean: 조용필; born March 21, 1950) is a South Korean singer-songwriter. Dubbed the "King of Pop" of South Korea, he is considered one of the most influential figures in the country popular music genre, K-pop. Over a five-decade career, his songs have ranked number one on local music charts in the 1970s, 1980s, 1990s and 2010s.

Born in Hwaseong, Cho debuted as a member of the rock band Atkins in 1968 and made his solo debut with the hit single "Come Back to Busan Port" in 1976. Cho has released 19 solo albums and has remained consistently popular during his 50-year career. He was recognized with the Eungwan Order of Cultural Merit for his enormous impact on the country pop music scene. He was selected as Singer of the Year and his song "Bounce" was selected as Song of the Year in the surveys conducted by Gallup Korea in 2013.

== Career ==
=== 1950–1967: Early years ===
Cho Yong-pil was born in Songsan-myeon, Hwaseong, South Korea, on March 21, 1950 and spent part of his childhood in Seoul. He and actor Ahn Sung-ki were schoolmates at the now-defunct Kyungdong Middle School in Seoul and remained friends even though they attended different high schools. When Cho was seven, he happened to listen to Ray Charles playing the harmonica, and this inspired the young Cho to become a musician.

=== 1968–1975: Atkins, Five Fingers and Kim Trio period ===
Cho began his music career as a guitarist in various bands. In 1968, he formed a rock band called Atkins and played for the United States Army. Later, he joined Five Fingers, which played music by black artists. In 1971, Cho joined the band Kim Trio, which motivated him to perform rock music. Members of Kim Trio included Kim Dae Hwan (drum), Lee Nam Yee (bass) and Choi Yee Chul (guitar). This Kim Trio is different from the band of the same name from the 1980s.

=== 1976–1992: Solo debut and commercial success ===
Cho's debut single as a soloist, "Come Back to Busan Port", brought him national attention when it was released in 1976, later becoming a hit in Japan. Cho then made a Japanese-language version of the song, and sang live in Japan. The combined sales of the "Come Back to Busan Port" single and the LP featuring the song exceeded 3 million copies. He was accused of smoking marijuana in 1977 and was banned from performing until 1979. His first album, Woman Outside the Window (창 밖의 여자), was released in 1980 and has been followed by many others. In 1980, he held a concert at Carnegie Hall in New York, the first Korean singer to perform there. In 1988, he became the first South Korean singer to perform in China, before the establishment of diplomatic ties between the two countries.

=== 1992–2012: Commercial decline and concerts ===
His commercial success declined after the rise of the group Seo Taiji and Boys and many other young musicians. His studio albums released after 1992 were not so successful. Noticing this, he announced that he would stop appearing on television, concluding that he would hardly make any hits. Subsequently, he focused more on concerts and music performance. In 1993, his Busan concert attracted an audience of 1 million, a record for South Korea. The following year, he became the first South Korean singer to surpass 1 million record sales. In 2005, Cho performed a concert in Pyongyang, North Korea, a rare occurrence for a South Korean singer.

=== 2013–2021: Hello and 50th anniversary ===
In April 2013, Cho released his 19th album titled Hello, which debuted at number one on the South Korean charts, eclipsing Psy's "Gentleman". On April 25, 2013, he returned to television with the showcase "Hello". This show was also broadcast live on YouTube.

The album ranked number one on the Gaon Album Chart for the week of April 28 – May 4, 2013. Two songs from the album won first place on South Korean music shows: "Hello" and "Bounce". Following the success of Hello, Cho reissued 14 of his old albums. He later released a Japanese version of the album.

In 2018, Cho held a series of concerts to mark his 50th anniversary as a singer.

=== 2022: Road to 20-Prelude 1 ===
Cho released the single album Road to 20-Prelude 1 on November 18, 2022. To promote the album, he released a 30-second teaser video on his official YouTube channel on November 15. The video contains the titles of the new songs "Moment" and "Like Serengeti". He held a solo concert, 2022 Cho Yong-pil and the Great Birth, at the Olympic Gymnastics Arena in Seoul from November 26 to 27 and December 3 to 4.

=== 2024: 20 ===
Cho released his 20th album 20 on October 22, 2024, 11 years after the release of his previous album.

== Personal life ==
Cho married An Jin-hyeon in their 40s, but in early 2003, An died of heart disease at the age of 54.

== Discography ==
=== Korean studio albums ===
Title	Album details	Peak chart positions	Sales
Title	Album details	KOR	Sales
Woman Outside the Window (창밖의 여자)	Released: March 20, 1980; Label: Jigu Records; Format: LP	No data	KOR: 1,000,000
Candlelight (촛불)	Released: December 5, 1980; Label: Jigu Records; Format: LP	No data	No data
Cho Yong Pil 3	Released: July 10, 1981; Label: Jigu Records; Format: LP	No data	No data
Can't Find the Oriole (못찾겠다 꾀꼬리)	Released: May 17, 1982; Label: Jigu Records; Format: LP	No data	No data
My Friend (친구여)	Released: June 25, 1983; Label: Jigu Records; Format: LP	No data	No data
Party of Tears (눈물의 파티)	Released: February 9, 1984; Label: Jigu Records; Format: LP	No data	No data
Let's Go on a Trip (여행을 떠나요)	Released: April 10, 1985; Label: Jigu Records; Format: LP	No data	No data
In the Air (허공)	Released: November 15, 1985; Label: Jigu Records; Format: LP	No data	KOR: 1,000,000
Love and Life and Me! (사랑과 인생과 나!)	Released: May 10, 1987; Label: Pil Company, Jigu Records; Format: LP	No data	No data
Cho Yong Pil '88	Released: May 28, 1988; Label: Pil Company, Jigu Records; Format: CD, cassette	No data	No data
Q (10th Album Part II) (10집 Part II)	Released: January 14, 1989; Label: Pil Company; Format: CD, cassette	No data	No data
Reunion (추억속의 재회)	Released: January 20, 1990; Label: Universal Music; Format: CD, cassette	No data	No data
The Dreams	Released: April 20, 1991; Label: Universal Music; Format: CD, cassette	No data	No data
Cho Yong Pil 14	Released: October 1, 1992; Label: Universal Music; Format: CD, cassette	No data	No data
Cho Yong Pil and the Great Birth (조용필과 위대한탄생)	Released: July 1, 1994; Label: Universal Music; Format: CD, cassette	No data	No data
Eternally	Released: May 1, 1997; Label: Universal Music; Format: CD, cassette	No data	No data
Ambition	Released: October 27, 1998; Label: Universal Music; Format: CD, cassette	No data	No data
Over the Rainbow	Released: September 3, 2003; Label: Universal Music; Format: CD, cassette	No data	No data
Hello	Released: April 23, 2013; Label: Universal Music; Format: CD, LP, digital download	1	KOR: 250,046
20	Released: October 22, 2024; Label: Universal Music; Format: CD, LP, digital download	37	KOR: 8,215

=== Japanese studio albums ===
Title	Album details
Hello (Japanese Edition)	Released: October 16, 2013; Label: Universal Music; Format: CD, digital download

=== Japanese singles ===
List of charted Japanese singles
Title	Year	Peak chart positions	Sales
Title	Year	JPN	Sales
"Mio Mio Mio" / "Return to Busan Port" (ミオ・ミオ・ミオ / 釜山港へ帰れ)	1982	29	JPN: 260,000
"Lost in Thoughts" (想いで迷子)	1986	13	

== Bibliography ==
- Speech which wind conveys (1985)

== Accolades ==
=== Awards and nominations ===
Name of the award ceremony, year presented, category, nominee(s) of the award, and the result of the nomination
Award	Year	Category	Nominated work or nominee	Result	Ref.
Ampex Golden Reel Award	1982	Golden Reel Award	Cho Yong-pil	Won	
Baeksang Arts Awards	1981	Best Song – Film	"Candlelight" (from Love Becomes Bitterness)	Won	
Baeksang Arts Awards	1982	Best Song – Television	"Flower Wind" (from Flower Wind)	Won	
Gaon Chart Music Awards	2013	Album of the Year for the 2nd Quarter	Hello	Won	
Gaon Chart Music Awards	2013	K-Pop Contribution Award	Cho Yong-pil	Won	
Golden Disc Awards	1986	Album of the Year (Daesang)	Empty Space	Won	
Golden Disc Awards	1986	Album Bonsang	Empty Space	Won	
Golden Disc Awards	1986	Popularity Award	"Speech Which Wind Conveys"	Won	
Golden Disc Awards	2005	Lifetime Achievement Award	Cho Yong-pil	Won	
Golden Disc Awards	2014	Album Bonsang	Hello	Won	
KBS Song Festival	1980	Best Male Singer (Daesang)	"Woman Outside The Window"	Won	
KBS Song Festival	1981	Best Male Singer (Daesang)	"Red Dragonfly"	Won	
KBS Song Festival	1982	Best Male Singer (Daesang)	"Tragic Love"	Won	
KBS Song Festival	1983	Best Male Singer (Daesang)	"Dear Friend"	Won	
KBS Song Festival	1985	Best Male Singer (Daesang)	"Yesterday, Today And..."	Won	
KBS Song Festival	1999	Achievement Award	Cho Yong-pil	Won	
KBS Song Festival	1999	Best Singer of the 20th Century	Cho Yong-pil	Won	
Korea Popular Music Awards	2018	Thanks To You Award	Cho Yong-pil	Won	
Korean Broadcasters Awards	1998	Best Male Singer	Cho Yong-pil	Won	
Korean Music Awards	2004	Singer of the Year – Male	Cho Yong-pil	Nominated	
Korean Music Awards	2006	Achievement Award	Cho Yong-pil	Won	
Korean Music Awards	2014	Song of the Year (Daesang)	"Bounce"	Won	
Korean Music Awards	2014	Best Pop Song	"Bounce"	Won	
MBC Gayo Daejejeon	1980	Best Popular Singer (Daesang)	"Woman Outside The Window"	Won	
MBC Gayo Daejejeon	1981	Best Popular Singer (Daesang)	"Red Dragonfly"	Won	
MBC Gayo Daejejeon	1983	Best Popular Singer (Daesang)	"I Like You"	Won	
MBC Gayo Daejejeon	1984	Best Popular Singer (Daesang)	"Dear Friend"	Won	
MBC Gayo Daejejeon	1985	Best Popular Singer (Daesang)	"Darling"	Won	
MBC Gayo Daejejeon	1986	Best Popular Singer (Daesang)	"In The Air"	Won	
Melon Music Awards	2013	Best Rock	"Bounce"	Won	
Melon Music Awards	2013	Top Ten Artist Award	Cho Yong-pil	Nominated	
Mnet 20's Choice Awards	2013	20's Record	Cho Yong-pil	Won	
Mnet 20's Choice Awards	2013	20's Online Music	"Hello"	Nominated	
Mnet 20's Choice Awards	2013	20's Voice	"Hello" and "Bounce"	Nominated	
Mnet Asian Music Awards	2013	Song of the Year (Daesang)	"Bounce"	Won	
Mnet Asian Music Awards	2013	Best Vocal Performance – Male	"Bounce"	Nominated	
Mnet Asian Music Awards	2013	Artist of the Year (Daesang)	Cho Yong-pil	Nominated	
Mnet Asian Music Awards	2013	Best Male Artist	Cho Yong-pil	Nominated	
Mnet Asian Music Awards	2013	Album of the Year (Daesang)	Hello	Nominated	
Mnet Asian Music Awards	2013	Best Music Video	"Hello"	Nominated	
SBS Gayo Daejeon	2005	Special Achievement Award	Cho Yong-pil	Won	
Seoul Music Awards	2003	Live Award	Cho Yong-pil	Won	
Seoul Music Awards	2013	Best Album	Hello	Won	
Seoul Music Awards	2013	Main Prize (Bonsang)	Cho Yong-pil	Won	

=== State and cultural honors ===
Country or organization	Year	Honor	Ref.
Center for Cultural Unification Studies	2005	Grand Prize for Unification Culture	
South Korea	2003	Order of Cultural Merit (Bogwan, 3rd Class)	
South Korea	2013	Order of Cultural Merit (Eungwan, 2nd Class)	
Tanzania	2001	Medal of Culture	
