= MaeMae Renfrow =

American actress and model

- Born: April 20, 1997 (age 29)
- Other names: MaeMae; Mae Mae Renfrow; Maemae Renfrow
- Years active: 2012–present

MaeMae Renfrow (born April 20, 1997) is an American actress and model. On television, she is known for her role in the Nickelodeon series Hunter Street (2017–2019). Her films include Bomb City (2017).

== Early life ==
Renfrow grew up in Johnston co NC .

== Career ==
Renfrow began her career in modeling. In 2013, she appeared in the Korean edition of First Class Magazine. She modeled Vesela Zarankova's 2014 fashion collection for the online retailer Nineteenth Amendment, which featured in Harper's Bazaar UK the following year. She also had gigs with Boy London and was the face is several Christina Angelina murals, including the "Face of Reno. She appeared in music videos for Cho Yong-pil's "Hello" in 2013 and Nathan Sykes' "Over and Over Again" in 2015.

In 2016, Renfrow made her screen acting debut as Kristen in the digitally-released thriller film Sickhouse. The following year, she played Jade in the crime film Bomb City and Matilda Higgins in the Brat tween web series Attaway Appeal. From 2017 to 2019, Renfrow starred as Tess Hunter in the first two seasons of the Dutch-produced Nickelodeon adventure series Hunter Street.

Renfrow returned to television with guest appearances in episodes of the Netflix superhero series The Imperfects in 2022 and the Shudder anthology Creepshow in 2023. She has an upcoming role in the British-American horror film Oak.

== Filmography ==
=== Film ===
Year	Title	Role	Notes
2016	Sickhouse	Kristen	
2017	Bomb City	Jade	
2017	American Satan	Elias' Assistant	
2024	Oak	Faye Parker	
TBA	My New Friend Jim		

=== Television ===
Year	Title	Role	Notes
2017–2018	Hunter Street	Tess Hunter	Main role
2017	Attaway Appeal	Matilda Higgins	Web, main role
2022	The Imperfects	Zoe	Episode: "Zoe Must Be Destroyed"
2023	Creepshow	Jean	Episode: "Grieving Process"
2024	Amish Affair	Rachel	Television film

=== Music videos ===
Song	Year	Artist	Notes
"Hello"	2013	Cho Yong-pil	
"Over and Over Again"	2015	Nathan Sykes	
