= Wilson Mbomio =

English actor (born 2002)

- Born: 15 May 2002 (age 24); Hackney, London, England
- Other name: Wilson Radjou-Pujalte
- Years active: 2015–present

Wilson Enrique I. Mbomio Mba Radjou-Pujalte (born 15 May 2002) is an actor. He began his career as a child actor in the BBC One drama Dickensian (2016) and the Nickelodeon series Hunter Street (2018–2019). He has since starred in the Netflix series The Witcher (2019–2023). His films include Kindling (2023).

== Early life ==
Mbomio was born in Hackney, East London.

== Career ==
Initially credited as Wilson Radjou-Pujalte, in 2015, he made his television debut aged 12 as Aladdin in the CBBC series Jamillah & Aladdin and his feature film debut as an orphan in Pan. This was followed by a role as the Artful Dodger in the BBC One drama Dickensian. He also played a young John Luther in the Idris Elba music video "Murdah Loves John" and a young Hannibal (played by Nicholas Pinnock as an adult) in the History Channel docudrama Barbarians Rising.

Mbomio had a recurring role as Bobby in the CBBC adaptation of Hetty Feather in 2017. In 2018, he joined the main cast of the Dutch-produced Nickelodeon adventure series Hunter Street as Jake Hunter. He starred in the film We the Kings with Elliot James Langridge and had a small role in Yorgos Lanthimos' The Favourite.

From 2019 to 2023, Mbomio starred in the Netflix adaptation of The Witcher as an elf boy named Dara. Mbomio starred in the 2023 drama film Kindling; he and the film's lead George Somner received critical acclaim for their performances.

== Filmography ==
=== Film ===
Year	Title	Role	Notes
2015	Pan	Orphan	
2018	The Favourite	Pigeon Boy	
2018	We the Kings	Mackie	
2023	Kindling	Diggs	

=== Television ===
Year	Title	Role	Notes
2015–2016	Jamillah and Aladdin	Aladdin	Main role
2016	Dickensian	Dodger	5 episodes
2016	Barbarians Rising	Young Hannibal	Episode: "Resistance"
2017	Hetty Feather	Bobby	4 episodes
2018–2019	Hunter Street	Jake Hunter	Main role
2019–2023	The Witcher	Dara	Main role

=== Music videos ===
- "Murdah Loves John" (2015), Idris Elba
