= Stony Blyden =

Icelandic musician

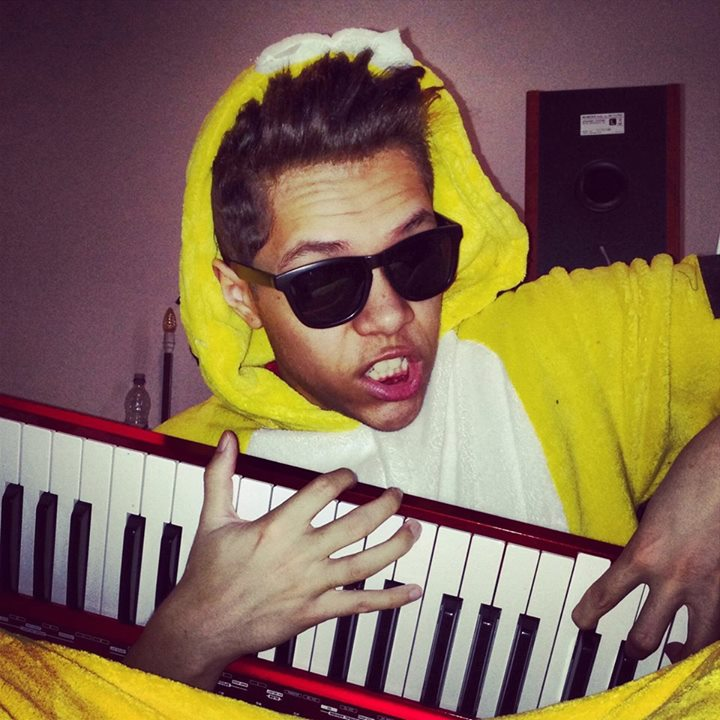
- Blyden in 2012

Background information
- Born: Þorsteinn Sindri Baldvinsson; 9 March 1993 (age 33); Reykjavík, Iceland
- Genre: Hip hop
- Occupations: Musician; rapper; actor
- Instruments: Bass; drums; guitar; synthesizer; sequencer; sampler; vocals
- Years active: 2011–present

Þorsteinn Sindri Baldvinsson Blyden (born 9 March 1993), better known by his stage name Stony Blyden, is an Icelandic musician and actor.

== Life ==
Blyden was born and raised in Reykjavík, Iceland. His father, Baldvin, is an Icelandic baker and his mother, Deborah, a Cuban fitness instructor. Blyden began drumming at an early age. He said that he learned English from watching Friends and Seinfeld.

== Career ==
For his musical artist name, he chose Stony, which is a rough translation of the second part of his Icelandic name, Thorsteinn, "Thor stone." Using a camera he borrowed from his father he started filming him and his friends covering various songs. He then went on to upload his own drum covers to YouTube under the name Stony's World. In 2014, he starred in a Pepsi commercial for 2014 FIFA World Cup.

He also created pop-inspired remixes of the Jake and Amir comedy web series produced by CollegeHumor, receiving millions of views on YouTube and a substantial number of purchases on ITunes. In a collaboration with Jake and Amir in 2019, Blyden stated that the proceeds from these remixes "got [him] through school" and that he continues to receive money from the songs to this day. As an actor, Blyden has appeared in the films The Standoff and Hope Springs Eternal, as well as the Hulu television series Casual. He stars in the 2017 Nickelodeon television series Hunter Street.

== Filmography ==
=== Film ===
Year	Title	Role	Notes
2016	The Standoff	Klyde Kosar	
2018	Dude	Stony	
2018	Hope Springs Eternal	Seth Grass	
2020	Life in a Year	Kiran	
2025	You're Cordially Invited	Oliver	

=== Television ===
Year	Title	Role	Notes
2016	Casual	Cookie Guy	Episode: "Big Green Egg"
2017–19	Hunter Street	Max Hunter	Main role (33 episodes)
2018	Run for Your Life	Miles	Television film
2019	Bluff City Law	Emerson	Recurring role (10 episodes)
2022	How I Met Your Father	Jasper	8 episodes
2022	Big Shots	Jackson Hoover	5 episodes
2023	American Born Chinese	Andy	5 episodes
2023	Goosebumps	Trey	

== Discography ==
- 2014: Feel Good
