= Sarah Nauta =

Dutch singer and actress

- Born: 18 June 1998 (age 28); Amsterdam, Noord-Holland, Netherlands
- Genres: Pop
- Occupations: Singer, actress
- Years active: 2010–present

Sarah Nauta (born 18 June 1998) is a Dutch actress, singer, and dancer.

== Life and career ==
Nauta was born in Amsterdam. She’s a musician and sings with her younger sister Julia Nauta, as well as plays the guitar and ukulele. She played Jane in Mary Poppins in the Dutch theater. In 2013, she was a member on the Junior Eurosongfestival 2013 as a duo with Julia. She also lent her voice in television series like Winx Club and Zoey 101. She also played Loes in SpangaS.

== Filmography ==
=== Film ===
Year	Title	Role	Notes
2015	Fashion Chicks	Lizzban	
2018	Elvy’s Wereld: So Ibiza!	Emma	
2020	De grote slijmfilm	Vesper	
2021	De nog grote slijmfilm	Vesper	

=== Television ===
Year	Title	Role	Notes
2009-2010	Kinderen voor Kinderen	Herself	Singer, 2 episodes
2013	Junior Songfestival 2013	Herself	Singer, 2 episodes
2014	Zóóó!	Herself	1 episode
2015	Spotlight	Sarah	1 episode
2015-2016	SpangaS	Loes de Gasse	Main role, 22 episodes
2016	The Lodge	Lori	4 episodes
2016	De Ludwigs: Op jacht naar de stenen schat	Robijn	Main role, 23 episodes
2018-2020	All Together Now	Herself	Judge, 16 episodes
2019	De Ludwigs	Robijn	2 episodes
2019-2021	Hunter Street	Jasmyn	Main role, 42 episodes
2020	Red Light	Marit	2 episodes

=== Other Roles ===
- Winx Club – Macy and Lemmy (voice, Dutch dub)
- Zoey 101 – Rebecca and Dana (voice, Dutch dub)
