= Forestella =

South Korean boy band

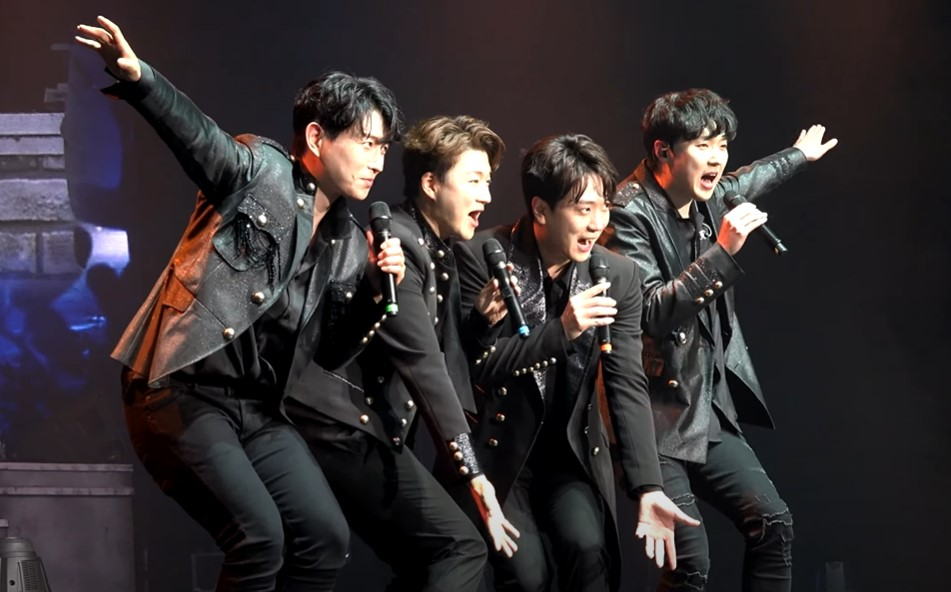
- Forestella in 2019; L-R: Bae Doohoon, Cho Mingyu, Ko Woorim and Kang Hyung-ho

Background information
- Origin: Seoul, South Korea
- Genre: Crossover, Pop, Classical music
- Years active: 2017–present
- Labels: Art & Artist (former); Beat Interactive (present)
- Members: Cho Mingyu; Bae Doo-hoon; Kang Hyung-ho; Ko Woo-rim

Forestella (Korean: 포레스텔라) is a South Korean crossover male vocal quartet formed through the JTBC singing competition Phantom Singer 2, which aired in 2017. They won first place on the show and officially debuted on March 14, 2018, with the album Evolution. Since their debut, they have released another two studio albums and gained public recognition for their performances on Immortal Songs: Singing the Legend, festivals and other televised concerts. They appeared in a total of twelve episodes on Immortal Songs special King of Kings. They competed in a total of nine episodes. They lost two episodes at first but then won seven consecutive episodes, which is considered as an absolute record in the show's history. Because of that record, they were invited as a special guest for celebratory performances in the 2023, 2024, and 2025 King of Kings Specials.

== History ==
=== Background ===
The quartet was formed through the second season of the singing competition Phantom Singer. Cho Mingyu, Ko Woo-rim, Bae Doo-hoon, and Kang Hyung-ho each separately auditioned for the competition. During the competition, Cho Mingyu selected Ko Woo-rim for the 2nd round competition and trained him. Then, he selected Bae Doo-hoon for the 3rd round competition to add variety to the team color. In the final competition, Kang Hyung-Ho joined the team. Cho Mingyu got the nickname "Strategist" during the competition because he meticulously considered each contestant's timbre and whether they would match his voice before selecting them. The quartet prior to the finals named themselves "Forestella", which is a portmanteau of "forest" and "stella" (Italian: star). As the winning group, they won prize money as well as an exclusive contract with Arts & Artists, which manages some of the country's preeminent classical musicians, to promote together for a year.

Bae is a musical actor who had studied acting at the Korea National University of Arts and occasionally sang for Aux, a gugak-rock fusion band. He appeared in Hidden Singer and The Voice of Korea prior to auditioning for Phantom Singer. Cho and Ko are the only classically trained singers of the quartet and are alumni of Seoul National University's famed College of Music. Cho had been planning to continue with graduate studies in Germany and was a member of the Seoul Metropolitan Opera for several years. Ko was then a third-year undergraduate voice major who had been a finalist and semi-finalist in several vocal competitions. Kang was the only member without any formal training in either music or the performing arts, although he was the vocalist of an amateur rock band he and some friends had formed as college students. He was a chemical engineer and researcher at Lotte and took a temporary leave of absence to audition, eventually resigning about a year after Forestella debuted.

=== 2017: Phantom Singer 2 ===
While on Phantom Singer 2, the members already differentiated themselves from other contestants for their willingness to experiment with other genres and for their "adventurous" song selections, a reputation which persists to this day. Bae, Cho and Ko had been grouped together in the same team during the first quartet stage and were the first team to perform a rock song, Imagine Dragons's "Radioactive", in its original style rather than rearranging it. Kang, despite his background as a vocalist in a rock band, had demonstrated his versatility performing various genres with other contestants. As Forestella, they surprised viewers with a tango-pop rock arrangement of Claudio Baglioni's "Come Un Eterno Addio" during the second final stage.

=== 2018: Debut ===
Forestella debuted on March 14, 2018, with the full-length album Evolution, which was praised by critics for showcasing the members' vocal abilities and reinterpretations of songs from a wide spectrum of genres. They held a series of concerts in Seoul before embarking on a nationwide tour in nine cities. After their tour ended, they held a series of joint concerts with Forte di Quattro, winners of the first season of Phantom Singer. During the latter half of the year, they gained further public recognition through their appearances on the KBS singing show Immortal Songs: Singing the Legend, especially after winning Episode 374, their first win on the show.

=== 2019–2020: Second album and continued success ===
In Episode 392 of Immortal Songs, which aired on February 23, 2019, the group covered "Bohemian Rhapsody" and the video of their performance uploaded by KBS went viral among both domestic and international fans, spawning numerous reaction videos. They caught the attention of Secret Garden who collaborated with them to record a Korean-language remake of "Beautiful". The song was pre-released as a digital single by Secret Garden and later included in the South Korean and Japanese releases of their album Storyteller.

On May 22, 2019, Forestella released their second full-length album Mystique, to both critical and popular acclaim. One of the tracks, "Dear Moon" (달하 노피곰 도다샤), was released as a promotional digital single two weeks prior and was based on a Baekje-era poem entitled "Jeongeupsa" (정읍사). It was one of the best-selling albums in the domestic classical charts, becoming certified "platinum" by December, and they became only one of three classical artists to have an album sell more than the "gold" certification that year.

In September 2019, the group decided to continue promoting together and renewed their group contract. Cho and Bae joined other agencies for their solo activities. Bae returned to musical theater while Cho and Kang both released songs as solo artists; Cho's first single album Shinsegae: New Age was released on February 16, 2020, while Kang released a single titled Universe on October 29, 2020. Ko opted against a solo career in favor of continuing his studies, although he has performed at various classical recitals and concerts.

On April 9, 2020, Forestella released a digital single, a remake of the song "Nella Fantasia", a more traditional classical crossover song. This was followed by another digital single "Together" (함께라는 이유), which falls into the pop genre, and an accompanying music video. "Together" was composed for them by the songwriter and producer Hwang Sung-je, who has composed or arranged for notable singers and K-pop groups including BoA, Shinhwa, Girls' Generation, Sung Si-kyung and Yoon Jong-shin. In August they were awarded the National Assembly's Culture Sports and Tourism Committee Award at the Newsis Hallyu Culture Daesang. They then released another two digital singles: "Words from the Wind" (바람이 건네준 말) and "Ties" (연(緣)). Although the members have always been actively involved in the production and arrangement of their releases, "Words from the Wind" was the first time they were officially credited as co-composers.

=== 2021–present: Third album, new label, first EP and first overseas tour ===
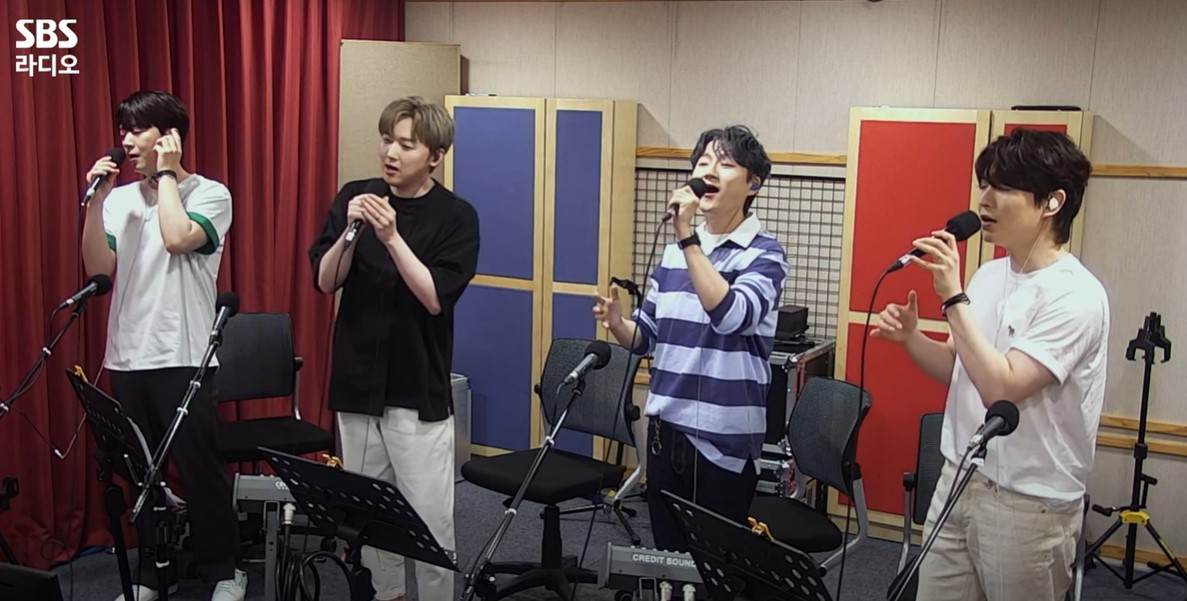
Forestella performing live at SBS Radio in 2022

Beginning in January 2021, a 12-episode "All Stars" edition of Phantom Singer was aired and Forestella were among the returning teams as the winners of the second season. They then released their third full-length album The Forestella digitally on April 19, while the physical album was released two weeks later. The four digital singles released the previous year were also included in the album. The album also included a Korean-language remake of Serge Lama's hit "Je suis malade"; they had covered the song in its original French that year on Phantom Singer All Stars and earned praise from Lama himself.

According to statistics compiled by the Korea Performing Arts Box Office Information System (KOPIS), Forestella ranked first in ticket sales within the "classical and opera" category for the first half of 2021. Despite multiple postponements and some of the dates of their Nella Fantasia: Time Travel and The Forestella tours having to be spread out over several months due to COVID-19 restrictions, three of the concerts ranked in the top 5 best-selling concerts within that category. On August 2, it was announced that the group signed with Beat Interactive after terminating their contract with their previous management two months earlier, although the individual members remain under their respective agencies for their solo activities. However their previous management would remain in charge of The Forestella tour as per their agreement since it had been scheduled prior to the contract termination.

In the 2021 Brand of the Year Awards, which took place on September 7, they were named Crossover Group of the Year.

On November 10, 2021, Kang released his debut solo album under the name PITTA, titled ID: PITTA. The following month, Cho released a solo album of his own, Shinsegae: Parana.

On May 30, 2022, the quartet released their first mini-album under their new label, The Beginning: World Tree, featuring the single "Save Our Lives" as its title track. All four members were given songwriting credit for "Save Our Lives", and a music video was also released on the same day. In December of the same year, it was announced that Forestella would be making a second comeback; their first single album, The Bloom: Utopia/The Borders of Utopia, was released on December 22, 2022. Dutch composer Valensia collaborated with them during the production of the title track "Utopia", sharing songwriting credit with the four members.

In January 2023, Forestella embarked on their first overseas tour, giving concerts in New York, Los Angeles and Vancouver. In April 2023, Kang released his second album as PITTA, Be Free, featuring the single "Be Free". On July 1, 2023, Forestella released a digital single, titled "White Night" (백야). It was followed by another digital single on 6 September, titled "KOOL".

== Members ==
Photo	English names	Native names	Voice range	Ref.
	Bae Doo-hoon	배두훈	Baritone~Tenor	
	Kang Hyung-ho	강형호	Tenor~Countertenor	
	Cho Min-gyu (Leader)	조민규	Leggero tenor	
	Ko Woo-rim	고우림	Basso profondo	

== Artistry ==
Known to domestic audiences for their appearances on Immortal Songs and KBS's televised public concerts Open Concert, the group has demonstrated their versatility in reinterpreting songs of various genres ranging from trot to gugak (traditional Korean music) and incorporating rock, pop and classical singing techniques into their performances. The diversity of their repertoire is apparent through the artists and ensembles they have performed together with, which include classical crossover tenor Paul Potts, gugak performers Song So-hee and Ahn Sook-sun and pop singer Jang Hye-jin. The members have stated that they never felt the need to limit themselves to any specific genre and preferred to experiment and draw inspiration from their varied individual musical preferences. When asked about why they ventured into the crossover genre, Cho and Ko both expressed their dissatisfaction with the limited repertoire they were given as singers trained in the Western classical opera tradition and hoped to challenge the conservatism still prevalent within the classical music community. The quartet have been praised by commentators for breaking barriers in the domestic music scene which existed between classically trained singers and other genres.

Forestella initially drew comparisons to Forte di Quattro, who won the first season of Phantom Singer. Newsis opined that "if Forte di Quattro is masculine and luxurious, Forestella has such a lively energy that you don't know where it would jump next. If Forte di Quattro feels like a gentleman, Forestella feels like an adventure full of dreams, hopes and escapades." However, unlike their Phantom Singer predecessors, Forestella's sound has been described as "leaning towards pop". Regardless of genre, their performances are generally characterized by well-defined harmonies and their unusually wide combined vocal range, anchored by Kang's countertenor and Ko's basso profondo tessiture respectively.

=== Immortal Songs performances ===
Forestella is the group with the most trophies with 15 victories total in the general count, sharing the top three with solo singers Jung Dong-ha and Ali, with 17 wins respectively.

They have the most consecutive wins on the King of Kings special in the show's history, with 7 overall wins as of July 2026, and they also became the first performers in the 15-year history of the show to achieve an "all-kill" victory twice in the King of Kings special tournament.

They hold the "Grand Slamer" title since 2020. The band had the "undefeated legend" (무패 신화) nickname until March 2026, when Touched broke their winning streak.

== Discography ==
=== Studio albums ===
Title	Album details	Peak chart positions	Sales
Title	Album details	KOR	Sales
Evolution	Released: March 14, 2018; Label: Arts & Artists, Universal Music; Formats: CD, digital download; Track listing: 1. "Evolution"; 2. "I'm Coming Now"; 3. "You Are My Star"; 4. "The Journey of Love" (사랑의 여정); 5. "My Eden"; 6. "L'immensita"; 7. "Dell'amore non si sa" 8. "In Un'Altra Vita"; 9. "Dream a Little Dream of Me"; 10. "Close Your Eyes" (눈을 감아도); 11. "Time Travel" (시간여행); 12. "Primula"; 13. "You Change My World"	13	KOR: 8,574
Mystique	Released: May 22, 2019; Label: Arts & Artists, Universal Music; Formats: CD, digital download; Track listing: 1. "Intro: Mystique"; 2. "Dear Moon" (달하 노피곰 도다샤); 3. "Angel"; 4. "Magic Castle" (마법의 성); 5. "My Favorite Things"; 6. "The Sky and the Dawn and the Sun"; 7. "Prelude de la Luna"; 8. "Hijo de la Luna" (달의 아들); 9. "All the King's Horses"; 10. "Nocturne" (야상곡); 11. "Bohemian Rhapsody"; 12. "The Flowers" (이 계절의 꽃)	14	KOR: 9,182
The Forestella	Released: April 19, 2021; Label: Arts & Artists, Universal Music; Formats: CD, digital download; Track listing: 1. "Nella Fantasia"; 2. "Words from the Wind" (바람이 건네준 말); 3. "Ties" (연(緣)); 4. "Alone with Tears" (눈물 속에 홀로); 5. "Your Song" (당신이 듣던); 6. "My Heart Will Go On"; 7. "Thriller"; 8. "We Are the Champions"; 9. "Together" (함께라는 이유); 10. "One Love" (feat. UK) (Special Track)	16	KOR: 12,005
The Legacy	Released: April 23, 2026; Label: Beat Interactive; Formats: CD, digital download; Track listing: 1. "In un'altra vita" 2. "Still Here"; 3. "Nella Notte"; 4. "Etude"; 5. "And Spring"; 6. "Flower Vase"; 7. "Parla più piano" 8. "Scarborough Fair"; 9. "Now We Are Free"; 10. "Snow Globe"; 11. "Armageddon"; 12. "The Show Must Go On"	17	KOR: 27,515

=== Extended plays ===
Title	EP details	Peak chart positions	Sales
Title	EP details	KOR	Sales
The Beginning: World Tree	Released: May 30, 2022; Label: Beat Interactive, Warner Music; Formats: CD, digital download; Track listing: 1. "Intro: Runes"; 2. "Save Our Lives"; 3. "Moonlight"; 4. "Stay" (멀어지지 말아주세요); 5. "The Forest Song" (숲의 노래) (feat. Soop Byeol); 6. "For Life"; 7. "Save Our Lives" (Instrumental); 8. "Moonlight" (Instrumental); 9. "Stay" (멀어지지 말아주세요) (Instrumental); 10. "The Forest Song" (숲의 노래) (Instrumental); 11. "For Life" (Instrumental)	14	KOR: 17,196
The Bloom: Utopia / The Borders of Utopia	Released: December 22, 2022; Label: Beat Interactive, Warner Music; Formats: CD, digital download; Track listing: 1. "Intro: Lotus"; 2. "UTOPIA"; 3. "UTOPIA" (Instrumental); 4. "UTOPIA" (Produce Version)	22	KOR: 14,296
Unfinished	Released: November 8, 2023; Label: Beat Interactive, YG Plus; Formats: CD, digital download; Track listing: 1. "Snow Globe"; 2. "White Night" (백야); 3. "Chagall's Dream"; 4. "Snow Globe" (Instrumental); 5. "White Night" (백야) (Instrumental); 6. "Chagall's Dream" (Instrumental)	20	KOR: 17,102

=== Singles ===
==== As lead artist ====
Title	Year	Peak chart positions	Album
Title	Year	KOR	Album
"Dear Moon" (달하 노피곰 도다샤)	2019	—	Mystique
"Bird, Bird, Blue Bird" (새야 새야 파랑새야)	2019	—	Nokdu Flower OST (part 1)
Nokdu Flower opening	2019	—	Nokdu Flower OST (part 3)
"Nella Fantasia" (넬라 판타지아)	2020	—	The Forestella
"Together" (함께라는 이유)	2020	— (Note: "Together" did not enter the Gaon Digital Chart, but peaked at position 97 on the Gaon Download Chart.)	The Forestella
"Words from the Wind" (바람이 건네준 말)	2020	—	The Forestella
"Ties" (연)	2020	—	The Forestella
"Save Our Lives"	2022	— (Note: "Save Our Lives" did not enter the Gaon Digital Chart, but peaked at position 19 on the Gaon Download Chart.)	The Beginning: World Tree
"White Night" (백야)	2023	—	Unfinished
"Kool"	2023	137	Non-album single
"Snow Globe"	2023	138	Unfinished
"Chosen One"	2023	—	Arthdal Chronicles Season 2 OST
"Stuck in a Maze"	2024	—	Non-album singles
"Piano Man"	2024	—	Non-album singles
"Apocalypse"	2024	—	Non-album singles
"And Spring" (그리고 봄)	2024	119	The Legacy
"Everything"	2025	109	Non-album singles
"Still Here"	2025	123	The Legacy
"Nella Notte"	2026	106	The Legacy
"Etude"	2026	123	The Legacy
"Armageddon"	2026	116	The Legacy
"Changgwi!"	2026	—	Non-album single
"—" denotes releases that did not chart.

==== Collaborations ====
Title	Year	Album
"L'impossibile Vivere" with Forte di Quattro	2018	Non-album single
"Beautiful" with Secret Garden	2019	Storyteller
"Ttanttala Blues" with Lunchsong Project (Kwon Tae-eun)	2020	No Man Is an Island
"Christmas Time" with A.C.E & Son Ho Young (SHY)	2021	Christmas Time

==== Participation releases ====
Title	Year	Peak chart positions	Album
Title	Year	KOR	Album
"Maldita Sea Mi Suerte" (original by Marc Anthony)	2017	— (Note: "Maldita Sea Mi Suerte" did not enter the Gaon Digital Chart, but peaked at position 33 on the Gaon BGM Chart.)	Phantom Singer 2 Episode 9 (TV Episode 12)
"In Un'altra Vita" (original by Claudio Baglioni)	2017	— (Note: "In Un'altra Vita" did not enter the Gaon Digital Chart, but peaked at position 50 on the Gaon BGM Chart.)	Phantom Singer 2 Episode 9 (TV Episode 12)
"Come Un Eterno Addio" (original by Claudio Baglioni)	2017	—	Phantom Singer 2 Episode 10 (TV Episode 13)
"Il Mirto E La Rosa" (original by Alessandro Safina)	2017	—	Phantom Singer 2 Episode 10 (TV Episode 13)
"Time in a Bottle" (original by Jim Croce)	2021	— (Note: "Time in a Bottle" did not enter the Gaon Digital Chart, but peaked at position 26 on the Gaon Download Chart.)	Phantom Singer All Star Episode 2
"Je Suis Malade" (original by Serge Lama)	2021	— (Note: "Je suis malade" did not enter the Gaon Digital Chart, but peaked at position 57 on the Gaon Download Chart.)	Phantom Singer All Star Episode 3
"Snail" (달팽이) (original by Panic)	2021	— (Note: "Snail" did not enter the Gaon Digital Chart, but peaked at position 50 on the Gaon Download Chart.)	Phantom Singer All Star Episode 9
"Inner Universe" (original by Origa)	2021	— (Note: "Inner Universe" did not enter the Gaon Digital Chart, but peaked at position 60 on the Gaon Download Chart.)	Phantom Singer All Star Episode 11
"The Innocent Macho" (순정마초) (original by 파리돼지앵 (정형돈,정재형))	2022	–	[Vol.128] You Hee yul's Sketchbook With you : 83th Voice 'Sketchbook X Forestella'
"I still remember" (아직도 기억하고 있어요) (original by Jeong Mijo)	2022	–	[Vol.129] You Hee yul's Sketchbook With you : 83th Voice 'Sketchbook X Forestella'

=== Immortal Songs: Singing the Legend ===
Ordinal Number (Note: Counting only the episodes where Forestella competed, excluding the episodes with no results or Forestella performing as a guest)	Episode #	Broadcast Date	Legends or Themes	Order of Performance	Songs	Result
1	366	August 18, 2018	Gayo Stage Special	1st Performer	"The Moonlight in Shilla" (신라의 달밤)	Lost
2	373	October 13, 2018	Korean Lyric Awards Special	4th Performer	"Arirang All Alone" (홀로 아리랑)	Won (429)
3	377	November 10, 2018	Choi Yang Sook	6th Performer	"Footprints in the Sand" (모래 위의 발자욱)	Won (432)
4	383	December 29, 2018	2018 King of Kings Special	4th Performer	"Magic Castle" (The Classic) (마법의 성 (더 클래식))	Lost
5	390	February 16, 2019	Lee Jang Hee	5th Performer	"Who Cares When I Like It" (좋은 걸 어떡해 (김세환)) (orig. Kim Se Hwan)	Won (429)
6	391	February 23, 2019	Queen	1st Performer	"Bohemian Rhapsody"	Lost
7	404	May 25, 2019	Ha Joong Hee	4th Performer	"The Face I Miss"	Lost
8	409	June 29, 2019	The 1st Half of 2019 Special, 7 Teams' Big Match	2nd Performer	"If I Leave"	Lost
9	419	September 7, 2019	Im Chang-jung	4th Performer	"My Lover"	Won (431)
10	425	October 19, 2019	DJ Bae Cheol-soo	4th Performer	"Heal the World"	Lost
11	429	November 16, 2019	Cha Jung-rak & Bae Ho	1st Performer	"Goodbye"	Lost
12	433	December 14, 2019	2019 King of Kings Special	3rd Performer	"The Unwritten Legend"	Won (417)
13	446	March 14, 2020	Shin Seung-hun	1st Performer	"For a Long Time After That"	Lost
14	453	May 2, 2020	Park Sang-chul vs. Park Hyun-bin	3rd Performer	"Dead Drunk" (Gondre Mandre)	Lost
15	459	June 13, 2020	20th Anniversary of the June 15th North–South Joint Declaration, Here Comes Peace	6th Performer	"A Letter from a Private"	Won
16	462	July 4, 2020	King of Kings Special: 1st Half of 2020	5th Performer	"Champions"	Won (2nd consecutive win on the King of Kings special of the show)
17	487	December 26, 2020	2020 Kings of Kings Special	4th Performer	"We Are the Champions"	Won (3rd consecutive win on the King of Kings special of the show)
18	505	May 1, 2021	Time Travel Special	2nd Performer	"Scarborough Fair"	Lost
—	511	June 12, 2021	10th Anniversary Special	6th Performer	"Smooth Criminal"	No result
19	530	November 6, 2021	Vibe	5th Performer	"Saldaga/As We Live"	Won
20	537	December 25, 2021	2021 King of Kings Special	2nd Performer	"Lazenca, Save Us"	Won (4th consecutive win on the King of Kings special of the show)
21	548	March 26, 2022	Kim Chang-wan	5th Performer	"Laying Silks and Satins on My Heart" (orig. song by Sanulrim)	Won (Note: 13th tie and 5th joint win in the show's history with Kim Jae-hwan)
22	565	July 23, 2022	King of Kings Special: 1st Half of 2022	6th Performer	"Bad Romance" (orig. song by Lady Gaga)	Won (5th consecutive win on the King of Kings special of the show)
23	584	December 10, 2022	Patti Kim	1st Performer	"Till" (Vow of Love) (orig. song by Patti Kim)	Lost
24	586	December 24, 2022	2022 King of Kings Special	3rd Performer	"Mama" (orig. song by EXO-K)	Won (6th consecutive win on the King of Kings special of the show)
25	612	June 24, 2023	The "Last Song" Special	3rd Performer	"Legends Never Die" (orig. song by Against the Current)	Lost
—	615	July 15, 2023	King of Kings Special: 1st Half of 2023	Special Opening Performer	"Despacito" (orig. song by Luis Fonsi ft. Daddy Yankee)	_
—	639	January 6, 2024	Kim Soo-chul and New Friends (Note: Part 2. Continued from previous episode.)	3rd Performer (except Ko Woo-rim)	"Hijo de la Luna" & "The Show Must Go On" (Korean version of orig. song by Mecano and orig. song by Queen)	No result
26	646	February 24, 2024	Kim Bum-soo	5th Performer (except Ko Woo-rim)	"Story Sadder Than Sadness" (orig. song by Kim Bum-soo)	Lost
—	670	August 31, 2024	King of Kings Special: 1st Half of 2024	Special Opening Performer (except Ko Woo-rim)	"Piano Man" (orig. song by Billy Joel)	_
—	713	July 5, 2025	2025 King of Kings Special	Special Opening Performer	"Abracadabra" (orig. song by Lady Gaga)	_
27	722	September 13, 2025	Lee Young-ae	4th Performer	"Flower Vase" (orig. song by Yang Hee-eun)	Won (399)
28	748	March 21, 2026	30th Anniversary of the death of Kim Kwang-seok	1st Performer	"To You" (orig. song by Kim Kwang-seok)	Lost
29	765	July 18, 2026	2026 King of Kings Special	1st Performer	"Changgwi" (orig.song by Ahn Ye-eun)	Won (403) (7th consecutive win on the King of Kings special)

=== Phantom Singer All Star ===
Round #	Episode #	Theme	Songs	Result
1	2	Quartet vs Quartet	"Time in a Bottle" (original by Jim Croce)	Lost
2	3	You and Me! (Note: vs La Poem vs Forte di Quattro)	"Je Suis Malade" (original by Serge Lama)	Lost
5	7	Battle of the Genres (as Pop Prince) (Note: vs La Poem as Pop Diva)	"Shape of You" (original by Ed Sheeran)	Won (Overall MVP)
6	9	K-pop Showdown	"Snail" (달팽이) (original by Panic)	Lost
7	11	Best of the Best	"Inner Universe" (original by Origa)	Lost

== Filmography ==
=== Television ===
Year	Title	Network	Notes
2017	Phantom Singer Season 2	JTBC	1st Winner
2018	Sugarman Season 2	JTBC	Ep 17
2018–present	Immortal Songs: Singing the Legend	KBS	Recurring
2019	Five Cranky Brothers	JTBC	Ep 5
2020	You Heeyeol's Sketchbook	KBS	Ep 489
2021	Phantom Singer All Stars	JTBC	Ep 1–12 Won (Overall MVP)
2021	Everyone's Art	MBC	Ep 10
2022	You Heeyeol's Sketchbook	KBS	Ep 581, 582, 593
2022	YOU QUIZ ON THE BLOCK	TVN	Ep 174
2023	Omniscient Interfering View	MBC	Ep 239
2023	Where is My Home	MBC	Ep 200
2023	Walk into the illusions	KBS	Ep 20, 21
2025	Bangpan Music : Anywhere You Go	KBS	Ep 2, 3
2025	Live Wire	Mnet, tvN	Ep 9
2025	Stars' Top Recipe at Fun-Staurant	KBS	Ep 297
2026	Where is My Home	MBC	Ep 345
2026	Jeon Hyun-moo Plan 3	MBN	Ep 27
2026	The Seasons - Sung Si-kyung's Ear-Pleasing Boyfriend	KBS	Ep 5
2026	Happy Together: It's Good Not to Be Alone	KBS	Ep 11, 12

== Tours ==
=== Solo concerts and tours ===
- Evolution Tour (2018)
- Forest and Stars Concerts (2018)
- Mystique Tour (2019)
- Winter Forest Concerts (2019)
- Nella Fantasia: Time Travel Tour (2020–2021)
- The Forestella Tour (2021)
- The Royal in Seoul (2021–2022)
- The Beginning : World Tree Tour (2022)
- The Beginning : World Tree FORESTELLA FESTIVAL (2022)
- LOVE IN SEOUL - Forestella (2022)
- The Royal : Palace of Forestella (2022–2023)
- North American Tour (2023)
- The Light Tour Concert (2023)
- Forestella Festival (2023)
- FNL (Forestella Night Live) Show (2024)
- The Illusionist (2024)
- THE WAVE Tour Concert (2025)
- Island Meets Music - Yonghodo Forestella (2025)
- Hope Concert with Forestella (2025)
- The Legacy Tour Concert (2025–2026)
- The Legacy : Symphony (2026)
- Forestella XSCALA SERIES Concert (2026)

=== Joint concerts and tours ===
- Phantom Singer 2 Tour (2017–2018)
- Phantom vs Phantom Concerts (2018) (with Forte di Quattro)
- Illuso: Autumn's Masterpieces Concerts (2019) (with Forte di Quattro, Miraclass and Ingihyunsang)
- Phantom of Classic Concert (2019) (with Forte di Quattro and Miraclass)
- Phantom Singer All Stars Gala Concerto (2021)

== Awards and nominations ==
Name of the award ceremony, year presented, category, nominee of the award, and the result of the nomination
Award ceremony	Year	Category	Nominee	Result	Ref.
Newsis K-Expo Cultural Awards	2020	National Assembly Culture, Sports and Tourism Committee Chairman's Award	Forestella	Won	
Brand of the Year Awards	2021	Crossover Group of the Year	Forestella	Won	
Korea First Brand Awards	2022	Best Crossover Group	Forestella	Won	
Brand of the Year Awards	2022	Crossover Group of the Year	Forestella	Won	
K-Global Heart Dream Awards	2022	K-Global Crossover Award	Forestella	Won	
Brand of the Year Awards	2023	Crossover Group of the Year	Forestella	Won	
Brand Customer Loyalty Awards	2023	Crossover Group	Forestella	Won	
Brand of the Year Awards	2024	Crossover Group of the Year	Forestella	Won	
Brand Customer Loyalti Awards	2025	Crossover Group	Forestella	Nominated	
Brand of the Year Awards	2025	Crossover Group of the Year	Forestella	Nominated	
KBS Entertainment Awards	2025	Popularity Award	Forestella	Won	
KBS Entertainment Awards	2025	Excellence Award (Show/Variety Category)	Forestella	Nominated	
Hanteo Music Awards 2025	2026	Special Crossover	Forestella	Won	
Hanteo Music Awards 2025	2026	Best Artist Pick	Forestella	Nominated	
Brand of the Year Awards	2026	Crossover Group of the Year	Forestella	Nominated	
