= Trot (music) =

Korean music genre

- Etymology: from the English word foxtrot
- Stylistic origins: Korean folk; enka; ryūkōka; blues; jazz; European popular folk music
- Cultural origins: Korea during Japanese rule
- Derivative forms: K-pop

Subgenres
- Old trot; traditional trot; elegy trot; gugak trot; ballad trot; rock trot; semi trot; ppongjjak

- Trot
- Hangul: 트로트
- RR: teuroteu
- MR: t'ŭrot'ŭ

North Korean name
- Hangul: 계몽기 가요
- Hanja: 啓蒙期 歌謠
- RR: gyemonggi gayo
- MR: kyemonggi kayo

Trot (Korean: 트로트; RR: teuroteu) or Ppongjjak (Korean: 뽕짝) is a genre of Korean popular music, known for its use of repetitive rhythm and vocal inflections. Originating during the Japanese occupation of Korea in the first half of the 20th century, trot was influenced by many genres of Korean, Japanese, American, and European music.

Trot has been around for almost 100 years and its distinct singing style has been continuously evolving. Trot music developed in rhythms during Japanese colonial rule. After the liberation of the Korean peninsula and the Korean War (1950–1953), artists such as Lee Mi-Ja, Choi Sook-ja, Bae Ho, Nam Jin, Na Hun-a, Joo Hyun-mi and many others helped to make trot popular. With the rise of K-pop from the 1990s onwards, trot music lost some popularity and was viewed as more old-fashioned. However, from the 2000s onwards, young trot singers such as Jang Yoon-jeong, Hong Jin-young, K-pop singers such as Super Junior-T, Daesung, MJ and Lizzy, renewed interest in the genre and popularised it among young listeners.

Although the genre originated before the division of the Korean peninsula, it is actually now mainly sung in South Korea; the associated pop culture, together with nursery rhymes, new folk songs in North Korea were categorized as "Enlightenment Period song" (계몽기 가요). It is no longer composed as propaganda music has since displaced other musical forms. Those songs were only orally recorded. It was intentionally revived during Kim Jung Il administration: in the late 2000s, Korean Central Television aired a TV program that introduced those "Enlightenment songs".

== Etymology ==
The name "trot" is a shortened form of "foxtrot", a style of ballroom dance that influenced the simple two-beat rhythm of trot music. Except two-beat rhythm, trot and foxtrot do not share any other notable characteristics.

== Characteristics ==
=== Rhythm ===
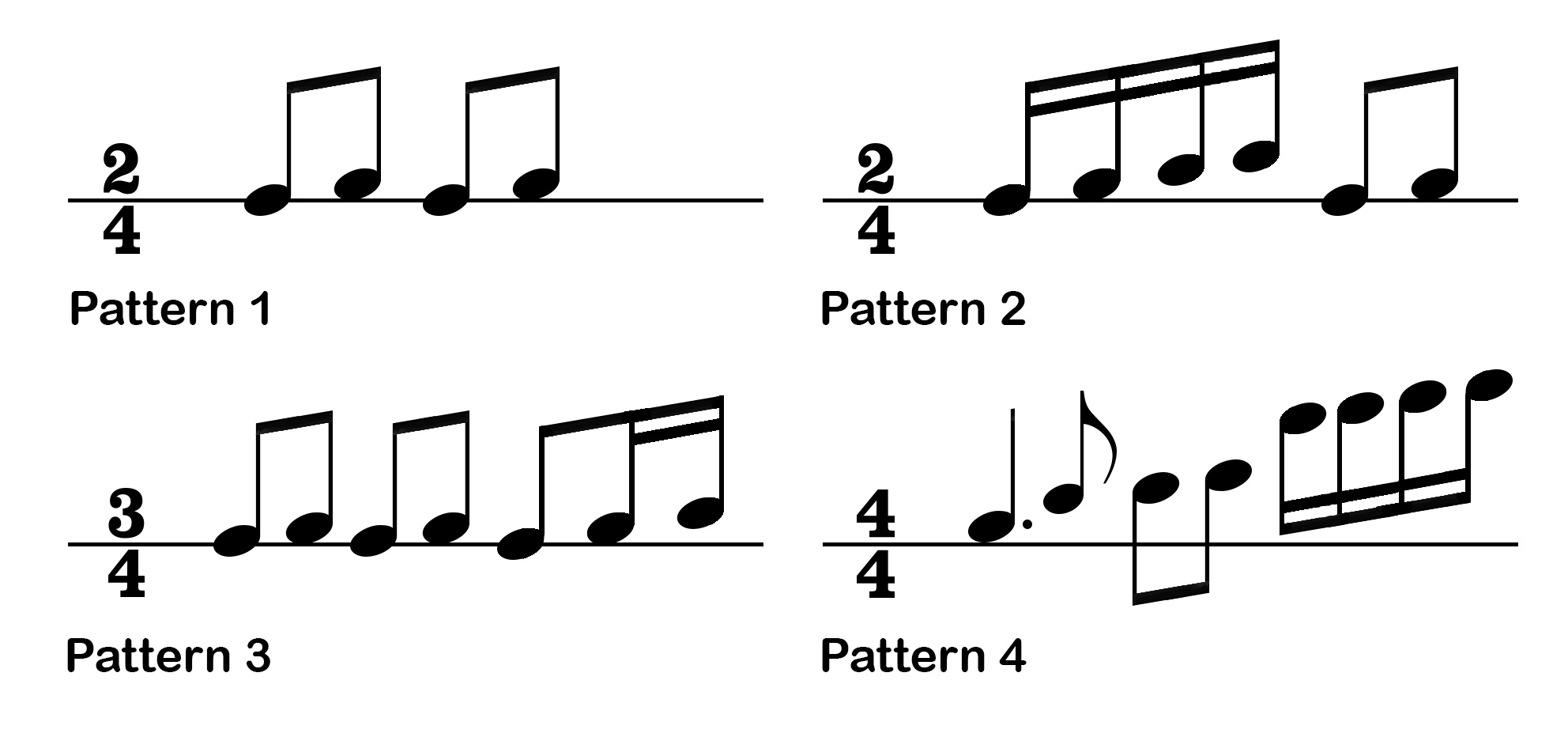
simple duple, triple and quadruple metre patterns are common in trot music

The trot is known for being composed in a two-beat rhythm, also known as the duple metre. In its early days, trot music was often composed using the pentatonic scale and minor keys. This pattern is called an anhemitonic scale or anhemitonic pentatonic scale, which was characteristic in Korean 'Gyeonggi-minyo' and other folk music such as early Japanese enka. The pentatonic scale consists of five degrees: of the natural major scale, the 4th and 7th degrees are omitted, and to form the pentatonic minor scale, all these 5 degrees will descend 3 degrees. Before 1950, the pentatonic minor scale dominated in popularity; however, the pentatonic major scale had started to become more popular. After the Japanese occupation, trot music was composed using the heptatonic scale and major keys. In trot music, lower tones are generally sung with vibrato, while higher tones are sung with the flexing or turning technique called 'kkeokk-ki' (literally means flexing, 꺾기).

=== Kkeokk-ki ===
The 'Kkeokk-ki' technique may be better explained by the gruppetto ornament of Western classical music theory. A note is figured as if it had been split into two or four subsidiary notes. And the voice is inflected to these imaginary notes: e.g. one quarter note is split into four sixteenth notes: (1) one in original pitch, (2) one in upper pitch, (3) one in lower pitch and (1) one in original pitch again (see below image, the example measure is from Na Hun-a's "물레방아 도는데", "Turning Waterwell"). Kkeokk-ki happens in the transition between two notes in the original pitch. For ordinary listeners, it is not easy to quickly perceive the subtlety of this technique. However, any trot singer can hardly do without the elaborated effect of Kkeokk-ki.

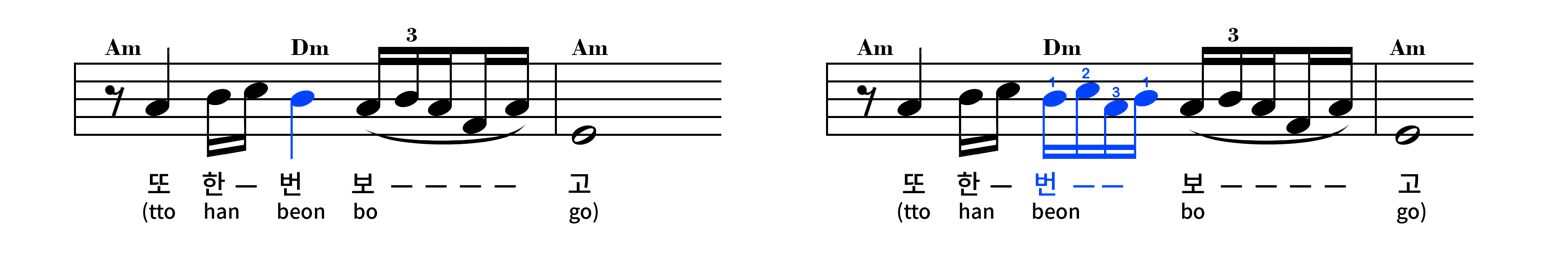

=== Lyrics ===
Most of trot's lyrical content is based on two popular themes, although they vary with the times: 1) love and parting, 2) longing for a sweet home. Some see the origin of this sentimentalism in "colonial tragedy". But that may well be related to the ancient tradition of resentment or deep sorrow (Han, 한 (恨)) in Korean culture. Elegiac song texts with minor scales are the most common. In addition to the elegiac rhythm and the content of the lyrics, the 'new stream' in the theater (신파극), introduced in the 1910s from Japan, has also contributed to the fact that trot is dominated by the moods of compassion and pain. Because the pieces of this 'new stream' frequently dealt with themes such as the family tragedy, love affairs—the best pieces were "Janghanmong" (장한몽 alias 이수일과 심순애), "Cheated in Love, Cried of Money" (사랑에 속고 돈에 울고); the great hit song "Don't Cry Hongdo" (홍도야 울지 마라) sings just the tragic story of the piece "Cheated in love, Cried of money". So it is understandable that many Koreans tend to be sad or compassionate when they hear trot songs. Sentimental words like 'crying' and 'leaving' have been consistently the most popular. But speech levels, which are recognizable at a sentence's final ending in Korean, have changed with the times; since 1990 the sentence in the low-level of politeness (반말) is often used.

=== Performance ===
Trot music is mainly performed by one singer or at most a duet. It is rare for a trot singer to play any instrument while singing. The playing of the instruments has something of an accompaniment function. The song usually being played by an orchestra or a big band as accompaniment. These use mostly backing vocals, usually consisting of 4 female vocalists, but rarely of mixed vocalists. The trot music shows often include a group of dancers. Thus, a typical broadcasting band orchestra for trot consists of instrumentalists, chorus, and dancers. Of course, it is possible for a singer to perform a song accompanied by one or two instruments; e.g. Joo Hyun-mi sings in her YouTube channel, accompanied only by guitar and accordion. Apart from the talent of a singer, the composer plays an important role in the success of a trot song. Since there are few trot singers and songwriters, a trot singer often gets his or her own singing style with the composer who always prepares a song for release with the singer.

== Naming ==
The name trot has been widely used since the 1980s, even though the designation itself dates back to the 1950s. (Note: p. 64 "In reality, the term "trot" began to circulate more widely in the 1950s during and after the Korean War (1950-1953). ... The names of the rhythms were written next to the titles of popular songs while the term "trot" began to take shape as a genre unlike other dance rhythms (i.e. foxtrot).") In the 1920s the name yuhaeng-changga (Korean: 유행창가; Hanja: 流行唱歌) was in use; this name comes from the fact that yuhaeng means "trend, fashion, popular", and all sorts of western music, e.g. hymn, nursery rhyme, folksong, etc., as well as Japanese enka, which were introduced to the Korean people at the end of the 19th century, were called changga; popular music in the western style was called yuhaeng-changga, later abbreviated yuhaengga (유행가; 流行歌).

The trot is sometimes referred to as seongin-gayo (성인가요; 成人歌謠), which means "music for adults". Trot also has a newer name, jeontong-gayo (전통가요; 傳統歌謠), literally "traditional popular song". Calling trot jeontong-gayo may implicitly refer to national self-confidence and give people a sense of self-esteem, so that the uncomfortable suspicion of foreign origin would be eased. (Note: p. 78 "Obviously, the invention of the name chŏnt'ongkayo was driven by its legitimization process. However, the name chŏnt'ong-kayo does not indicate any specific textual or musical style, except for implying the old-fashioned style. Besides, the name chŏnt'ong-kayo is recently a subsidiary term of the song style t'ŭrot'ŭ in the popular discourse, as far as the nationality issue is involved.") The name daejung-gayo (대중가요; 大衆歌謠), or "music for the public", has been used historically for trot, but it is a wider term for all sorts of popular music, so K-pop for example, also falls under the label of daejung-gayo. Additionally, instead of teuroteu (트로트), the term teurot (트롯) is occasionally seen in written Korean.

== History ==
=== Origin ===
Trot music originated in Korea during the Japanese occupation of Korea. It is believed that trot's closest ancestors were Japanese enka. After the liberation of the Korean peninsula, however, trot has continued on its own path. There is an investigation showing that the songs that were published in Korea and Japan between 1945 and 1950 used in both countries pretty much the same amount of duple metre rhythm in a minor scale. It is sometimes asserted that trot's origins can be traced to siga (시가), a traditional form of Korean poetry, although this only partially explains origins since it is relevant to poetic and lyrical aspects only. Some suggest that trot could have been influenced by Korean folk music, which does have some resemblance to trot's vocal inflections, even if Korean traditional music's rhythmic structure differs from trot's fixed duple metre. It was true that a genre of Sin-minyo (new folk song, 신민요) was in circulation in the 1930s; but this music was simply modified versions of traditional folk songs e.g. Arirang or 'Taryeong' songs (Note: p. 47 "Thus, there can be different ways to interpret the same musical elements ... The singer and instructor said that one piece of song, particularly folksong, might be performed differently with two different rhythms. For instance, a folksong 'Nilliriya' can be performed on a rhythm of either semach'i or gukkŏri changdan. The first rhythm is one of the representative triple rhythms of Korean traditional music, while the second one is duple rhythm in a slower tempo. The instructor added that the rhythmic choice has been decided according to the performer's feelings. In short, there have been renditions both in triple and duple rhythm in the performance of traditional Korean folk songs.") accompanied by Western instruments.

It is an old controversial issue whether trot originated during Japanese colonial rule and thus is not a genuine Korean popular music. This problem has caused quite a stir twice. Once the government took a position in the 1960s that the supposedly 'Japanese-tinged' songs suffered at the hands of the censor. The second discussion took place by the musicians and cultural critics in the '80s, called the 'Ppongjjak debate'.

==== 'Japanese-tinged' censorship ====
The particular hostile emotional response to the former Japanese colonial rule has led the government to banish the Japanese legacy. This also happened in the cultural area. There were listed songs that seemed to have been influenced by enka. At the time, such songs were disparagingly called 'Japanese-tinged' (왜색) and the songs that violated conventional morality were called 'degenerate songs' (퇴폐 가요). First, in 1965 the broadcasters decided not to send out any more 'Japanese-tinged' songs. To it responded the singer association with the vehement protest. After that, in 1968 'Art and Cultural Ethics Commission' (the earliest commission of today's 'Korea Communications Standards Commission') decided to banish 108 songs and later more; the reasons were mainly 'obscene, vulgar, degenerated and Japanese-tinged". Lee Mi-ja's "Camellia Lady" was on the list in 1965 as well as in 1968. She once recalled, "The then-President Park Chung Hee, who was blamed for the censorship, did not know that the song had been banned, so he asked her to sing it at a banquet." The censorship culminated in the 1970s, most affected were the songs of the so-called 'acoustic guitar singers'. The ban on "Camellia Lady" and others was lifted in 1987. However, this kind of censorship, which finds much of its breeding ground from history, is still ongoing. Just as "Japanese-tinged" trot songs were banished, so the anti-Japanese leftists in the 2010s insisted on having to replace the school songs composed by pro-Japan musicians.

==== Ppongjjak debate ====
In 1984 this dispute entered the national discourse in South Korea. The debate, initiated in a provocative article "Who does claim Ppongjjak as ours?" in 1984, centered on whether or not trot music originated from either Japanese or Korean music. Because the genre was borrowed from Japan during the colonial period of Korea, as well as incorporated Japanese song influences in Changga, the genre has been subject to questioning its Korean identity. This Korean identity question is subtly rooted in the argument that the Japanese cultural suppression policy led to Koreans uncritically accepting the popular music trot influenced by enka. Anti-Japanese critics went so far as to tag trot as artifacts from the Japanese colonial period. This probably one-sided statement was answered by musicians and critics who saw things differently and responded; the claim on the part of Korean classical music that trot is Japanese-tinged and thus such songs should be forbidden, is a useless judgment of the colonial victim mentality. The debate back and forth was held in the newspaper Hanguk Daily News from November to December 1984. Since no concrete evidence has arisen to validate either side, this debate continues to exist when discussing the origins of trot music.

=== 1920s–1950: Formation ===
"In Praise Of Death"
(사의 찬미)
Recorded in 1926; Yuhaengchanga

"My Older Brother Is A Busker"
(오빠는 풍각쟁이)
Recorded in 1938; Manyo

Before the 1920s, there was little information about popular Western music. In the 1920s, some recordings with a vague resemblance to trot were heard around Korea, but these were likely forms of Western popular music. To detail trot music's beginnings, the following songs are presented as 'forerunners':

Singer Yun Sim-deok (윤심덕) recorded "In Praise of Death" (사의 찬미) 1926 by Japanese Nitto Records. It is often regarded as the first 'Yuhaengchangga'. Yun Sim-deok was a soprano. She had an affair with a married man, with whom she ran away and escaped: on a boat trip to Japan in 1927, she threw herself into the sea with the lover—there is a Korean film about this story. After her death, just such a story made the song widely known. The song was not originally composed, but Yun Sim-deok wrote lyrics and then transferred it to the waltz melody of "Waves of the Danube" by Ion Ivanovici. The song itself actually contains a few of the characteristics of trot.

"Pupil Song" (학도가), first recorded in May 1921 and sung by a Korean Christian youth group, became popular. This song belongs to marching songs. The melody of "Pupil song" was borrowed from "Railway Song" (鉄道唱歌), which Japanese composer Oono Umekawa had composed in 1900. Who wrote the lyrics of "Pupil song" is unknown. Several singers, e.g. Chae Gyu-yeop (채규엽), Go Un-bong (고운봉), recorded this song. The song became popular because the encouraging mood, evoked by a beat typical of marching songs, was appealing to those oppressed by Japanese rule. On the other hand, the Japanese "Railway Song" was later adapted to fit North Korean communist ideals, titled "Revolutionary Song Against Japan" (반일 혁명가) and "Rise Proletariat" (일어나라 무산대중).

A new contemporary music style, called manyo (만요), appeared in the 1930s. Its origins can be traced to Japanese mandan (漫談). This genre is characterised by satirical storytelling; hence its songs were also known as 'comic' songs. Some analyze the genesis and the circulation of this genre in the Japanese colonial era from a socially critical point of view. Whether this music actually had the educational function and had an effect on the catharsis of desire in society remains but open. One of manyo's most popular songs was "My Older Brother Is A Busker" (오빠는 풍각쟁이), recorded in 1938 by Park Hyang-lim (박향림). It is noteworthy that a manyo "Pleasant Old Man From The Country" (유쾌한 시골 영감), recorded in 1936 by Gang Hong-sik (강홍식), was an adaption of George W. Johnson's "The Laughing Song" (1895). Later in 1970 "Pleasant Old Man From the Country" was remade as "Seoul Tour" (서울 구경) by comedian Seo Yeong-chun (서영춘) and became a hit.

In the period of colonial rule, pop culture in Korea was clearly influenced by Japan, and Western culture (primarily from Christian missionaries). Many musicians, such as Yun Sim-deok, Chae Gyu-yeop, and Park Hyang-lim, were educated in Japan or by institutions founded by missionaries. They imitated songs from Japan or hymns and melodies from the West. In the 1920s there were few Korean composers who wrote original popular music. In the 1930s, Korean songwriters began composing original popular songs whose anhemitonic pentatonic scale was typical for trot as well as for enka. Lee Aerisu (이 애리수) recorded "Traces of Castle Ruins" (황성의 적) in 1931(released 1932), later remade under the title "황성 옛터" by many trot singers. This song marked a milestone in trot music. (Note: p. 24 "Yi Aerisu's song employs the pentatonic scale and is in three beats. That familiar connection to the traditional Korean soundscape facilitated the reception of Yi's song beyond the narrow circle of Westernizing, educated urbanites. ... Although yuhaengga was radically distinct from traditional Korean songs, Yi and her followers bridged the shifting soundscape of colonial Korea.") In 1931 the first countrywide competition for the new singers took place, in which Go Bok-su (고복수) was chosen and became one of the most prominent trot singers: his debut song, "Away From Home" (타향, later titled 타향살이) became a hit. In 1933 Okeh records company was founded, which promoted the development of trot and produced a lot of hit songs.

Hit trot songs in the 1930s:

- "Traces Of Castle Ruins" (황성 옛터, 1932)
- "Living Away From Home" (타향살이, 1934)
- "Tears of Mokpo" (목포의 눈물, 1935)
- "Serenade Of Sorrow" (애수의 소야곡, 1936)
- "Tearful Tumen River" (눈물 젖은 두만강, 1938)
- "Don't Cry Hongdo" (홍도야 울지 마라, 1939)

Before 1940, minor and pentatonic scales were predominant in trot. Thereafter the major key was used more often. This did not occur in Japanese enka at the time, hence the development is considered peculiar to trot. The simpler melodies of trot were enriched by it, gradually cheerful rhythms were created in the major key. But in the early 1940s, the country was overshadowed by the Pacific War. 5 years after the liberation from the Japanese colonial rule, the country suffered again under the Korean War in 1950. Nevertheless, several songs have been released during the 1940s (see below list). They are considered to be among the most significant examples, whose rhythms and moods profoundly influenced the development of the genre. So it is hardly possible to speak of trot without these songs.

Hit trot songs in the 1940s:

- "Traveler's Sadness" (나그네 설움, 1940)
- "Wild Rose" (찔레꽃, 1942)
- "Bindae-tteok Gentleman" (빈대떡 신사, 1943)
- "Weeping Over The Hill Of Baktalchae" (울고 넘는 박달재, 1948)
- "Moonlit Night Of Silla" (신라의 달밤, 1949)
- "Rainy Gomoryeong" (비 내리는 고모령, 1949)

=== 1950s: Diversification and the 8th US Army Clubs ===
After Japan's colonial rule over the Korean Peninsula and the Korean War, few remnants were left of the music industry since survival remained many people's priority. Record companies, most of which were founded in the colonial era, began to struggle. Yet vinyl records were the primary way to distribute music to the population since radios were not easy to purchase in the '50s; according to estimates, about 350,000 radios were supplied nationwide in 1959. National TV broadcasting began in 1956 and commercial TV broadcasting began in 1959. In 1957 US Army also built a transmitting station 'American Forces Korean Network' (AFKN). AFKN sometimes reached the largest US broadcaster abroad. In 2012 the previously independent AFKN was grouped under the 'AFN-Pacific Korea'. It's fair to say that AFKN unconsciously played for almost half a century the role of the US culture mediator. Many Koreans who were able to understand English had absorbed the western culture from this channel. (Note: "AFKN would become a cultural and educational tool for Koreans across the peninsula. Local foreign language "hakwons", or institutes, offered "AFKN English" classes, designed to help Korean students improve their English listening and translation abilities.") Mass media was a way to spread songs, another way was records. Songs were released as singles or, sometimes, as EPs. LP record album production began in 1958.

In the 1950s, two aspects should be emphasized. On the one hand, war and its effects had left its mark on trot music; wartime was reflected in songs. These included: the ode to soldiers that was "A Serenade of the Front Line" (전선 야곡, 1952), stories of separations during the Hungnam evacuation told in "Be Strong Geum-sun" (굳세어라 금순아, 1953), and the joy and sorrow of refugees in "Farewell Busan Station" (이별의 부산 정거장, 1953) by Nam In-su (남인수). The country's situation was reflected in the lamenting lyrics of "Spring Days Are Passing" (봄날은 간다) by Baek Seol-hee (백설희), released in 1953. A family of abducted prisoners of war was a subject in "Heartbreaking Miari Hill" (단장의 미아리고개, 1956). This song has been subsequently remade by many trot singers.

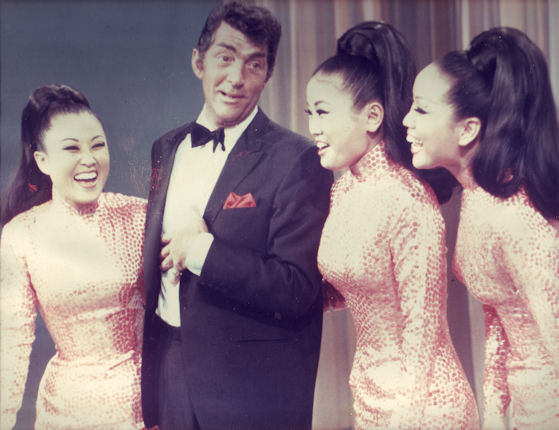
The Kim sisters with Dean Martin

On the other hand, some tried to overcome the devastation war brought. Trot music and modern Korean music as a whole was revitalised from the cultural exchange in US Army clubs. These clubs were the linchpin for some entertainers. In 1954, the Eighth United States Army was moved from Japan to Korea, stationed in Seoul Yongsan Garrison. Musicians, promoted by United Service Organizations, visited the 8th US army base to give a morale-boosting concert. The visit of Marilyn Monroe in 1954 was the most sensational; Jane Russell in 1957 and Nat King Cole in 1963 visited. The US army also enjoyed Korean artists. Koreans thereafter called the US Army clubs 'the 8th US Army Stage' (미8군 무대). There were two types of these stages; one was housed in the garrisons—in addition to Yongsan Garrison, the Camp Market club in Bupyeong District was also very popular. On the other hand, private clubs were opened around the garrisons, the so-called 'military camp town' (기지촌), e.g. in Dongducheon, Paju, Itaewon, where both soldiers and civilians could enter. While working there, the musicians immediately became acquainted with American music culture and trends. They got to know different genres like blues, jazz, swing, tango, contemporary folk and country music, etc. As a result, fundamental changes of song titles, lyrics and rhythms in Korean popular music took place. They later played a leading role as contemporary influences on South Korean music. Important trot composers like Lee Bong-jo (이봉조), Kim Hee-gap (김희갑), Kim In-bae (김인배), Park Chun-seok (박춘석), played instruments or worked as bandmasters in the 8th US army clubs. A lot of the famous rock bands and singers in the '60s and the '70s had their roots there. Some trot singers who started their career there are Choi Hee-jun (최희준), Bae Ho, Han Myeong-suk (한명숙), Hyeon Mi, Cho Yong-pil. Female trio singers The Kim Sisters became popular during this time, as their performances drew appeal from American soldiers and audiences, catapulting them to fame when they performed on The Ed Sullivan Show during the 1960s.

But the different genres have actually had little to do with the melodies of trot. They were more of an inspiration to diversify and modernise. Only the name 'blues' in the titles had been widely used since the 1930s; this came from Japanese examples. It was not intended for the blues genre, but blues' retarding 4 strokes rhythm caught the songwriter's attention so that they called some songs 'xx Blues'. During this time, songwriters came up with songs by giving newfangled titles in English: e.g. "Shoeshine Boy" (슈샤인 보이, 1952), "Tango In The Night" (밤의 탱고, 1953), "Evening Rain Blues" (밤비의 블루스, 1956), "Nilliri Mambo" (닐리리 맘보, 1957), '"Avec Youth" (청춘아베크, 1957), "Arizona Cowboy" (아리조나 카우보이, 1959), "Daejeon Blues" (대전 블루스, 1959).

=== 1960s: Enhancements ===
The country was slowly recovering from the aftermath of the war, although the political situation remained unstable. This ongoing disorder of society caused the military coup d'état in 1961. Despite this political turmoil, pop culture continued on its own path. Songwriters and singers who had picked up fresh ideas from US Army clubs and cultural exchange with Westerners incorporated them into trot. Modern sensibilities fused with those traditional to Korea in new songs. Han Myeong-suk released "Yellow Shirt Man" (노란 샤쓰의 사나이) in 1961, in a swing style. Its success swept across the country, so the singer from a nobody became a star.

"Camellia Lady" (동백 아가씨)
Lee Mi-ja recorded "Camellia Lady" several times. This sample is not from the first version in 1964.

A few years later, a new trot singer rose to fame. Lee Mi-ja recorded "Camellia Lady" (동백 아가씨) in 1964, the title song for the 1964 film of the same name. She recorded a lot of hit songs in the 1960s like "Yellow Robe Mast" (황포돛대, 1964), "Cry Fever" (울어라 열풍아, 1965), "Heuksando Lady" (흑산도 아가씨, 1967), "A Woman's Life" (여자의 일생, 1968), "A Father Goose" (기러기 아빠, 1969). Through her numerous hit songs and over two thousand trot songs she has released during her 60-year career, she is the singer of trot par excellence.

Well, the two songs evoke different images of people at the time. The image of the "Yellow Shirt Man" bursting with vitality was portrayed, but "Camellia Lady" was the traditional female figure in Korea who practices patience and fidelity in marriage. Kim In-bae (김인배), at that time a trumpet player in the US Army club, was one of the composers who aimed to update trot music. Therefore, in composing he oriented more on contemporary American pop, which he was familiar with in US Army clubs than the sensibilities and tone of conventional trot. Kim's "The Old Familiar Faces" (그리운 얼굴, 1963) was in a waltz style, whilst Kim's "Red Shoes Lady" (빨간 구두 아가씨, recorded by Nam Il-hae (남일해, 1963) and another renewal-loving composer Son Seok-u's (손석우) "Yellow Shirt Man" had elements of swing music. The prominent trot composer Park Chun-seok, who had debuted as a pianist in US Army Club, also wrote ballad-style music like "Early Rain" (초우, 1966) in addition to conventional trot. This song and Choi Sook Ja's hit song "Forsythia Girl" (개나리 처녀 and Patti Kim's hit songs, "Don't Forget You" (못 잊어), "Love Went By Leaving Autumn Behind" (가을을 남기고 간 사랑, 1968), "Does Anyone Know This Person?" (누가 이 사람을 모르시나요), all composed by Park, had semblances of what would become popular 'adult contemporary music'.

Through these composers and others, trot music became multifaceted, livelier and more spirited. The two following individuals were among the most successful trot singers in the '60s, known for their distinctive bass-baritone voices. Choi Hee-jun's talent was recognised by Son Seok-u, and he debuted with "A Pastoral Song" (목동의 노래, 1961). This song may belong to the genre of contemporary folk music. Other relative hits had less of a conventional trot sound and more of a classic pop sound, despite being in a duple metre like most trot. Examples include "My Lover Is Old Miss" (우리 애인은 올드 미쓰, 1961), "Barefooted Youth" (맨발의 청춘, 1964), "Student Boarder" (하숙생, 1965), "Palto-Gangsan" (팔도강산, 1967). Bae Ho (배호), then a drummer in Camp Market club, recorded his debut song "Arrow Of Love" (사랑의 화살, 1963) with tango rhythm. His early death at age 29 by nephritis and his songs made him a trot legend. In 1967, he released two significant songs "Return to Samgakji" (돌아가는 삼각지) and "Foggy Jangchungdan Park" (안개 낀 장충단 공원). The deeply vibrating soft voice was his trademark. After his death in 1971, many tried to imitate his singing style. It was suspected that several fake LPs, released under the name Bae Ho, should have been in circulation. Bae Ho and Nam In-su were the singers whose voice was often forged. By analyzing his voice, a few of his LPs were identified as counterfeit. Mean opinion score test with two mentioned songs has shown that Bae's voice moves between 100 and 300 Hz while singing. This is the frequency of a male average voice in a normal conversation. So it was explainable that his voice sounded so gentle while singing. (Note: p. 6295 "The reason why the voices feel so soft is that they usually sing between 100 and 300 Hz, which is the male voice tone.")

In the 1960s, the government intervened in popular culture and banished such songs that it considered 'Japanese-tinged' or 'unsound' while promoting the 'sound' songs. (Note: p.45 "This emphasis on the soundness of culture resulted in an increased emphasis on the public function of culture and the arts. This was thus liable to paralyse the critical thought of the people by providing a rationale for regulation of the so-called "unsound" culture".) Of course, composers still wrote sentimental songs, but even happy songs were increasingly popular. Kim Sang-hee (김상희) was one of the singers who mostly sang 'happy songs'. Examples of the 'happy songs' in the second half of the 1960s are: "Southern Village Over The Mountain" (산 너머 남촌에는, 1965), "Beanpole Mr. Kim" (키다리 미스터 김, 1966), "Baldy Man" (대머리 총각, 1967), "Honey!" (님아, 1968), "Song Of Seoul" (서울의 찬가, 1969), "Sergeant Kim From Vietnam" (월남에서 돌아온 김 상사, 1969), "Seosan Seaside Village" (서산 갯마을, 1969). This included the traditional folk song. Kim Serena (김 세레나) was the star for Sin-minyo (i.e. new Korean folk song). It almost seemed like she was a trot singer, but that was a unique phenomenon. Her hit songs: "Gapdori and Gapsuni" (갑돌이와 갑순이, 1966), "Sae-Taryeong" (새타령, 1967), "Seongju-Puli" (성주풀이, 1969). The popularity of Sin-minyo lasted until the first half of the 1970s. During this time Kim Serena, Choi Jeong-ja, Kim Bu-ja and Ha Chun-hwa made Sin-minyo still popular.

The young generation, born after the liberation of the Korean peninsula, now appeared on the trot stage and later became leading trot singers in the 1970s. Nam Jin (남진) made his debut at the age of 20 with "Seoul Playboy" (서울 플레이보이, 1965), Na Hun-a (나훈아) at the age of 17 with "Long Journey" (천리길, 1966), Moon Joo-ran (문주란) at the age of 16 with "Song Of Dongsuk" (동숙의 노래, 1966), Ha Chun-hwa as a child performer (6 years old) with "Filial Daughter Simcheong" (효녀 심청 되오리다, 1961). These singers have since released many songs of Park Chun-seok, and earned the nickname 'Park's troop'. In this decade, several composers also made their name known, among others Lee Bong-jo, Gil Ok-yun, Shin Jung-hyeon, Jeong Min-seop, all later composed a significant number of works.

=== 1970s: Heyday ===
South Korea became industrialised in the 1970s. As economic growth began, ordinary people became more and more interested in cultural life. Mass media such as radio and TV made trot widespread across the country—the household ownership of televisions rose rapidly from 6.4% in 1971 to 83.1% in 1980, so the pop artists gained more space to present themselves to the public. That's one factor in the rise of trot music in the '70s. The other was the young generation born around the time of liberation in 1945. Even though they debuted in the '60s they have since become trot icons.

Since 1966, Munhwa Broadcasting Corporation has hosted a popular variety show entitled 'MBC Ten Singers Match'; five singers each female and male are running in the team competition, and at the end of the show one of them will be chosen the best singer. The program was broadcast on the radio until 1968, then on television. It was renamed 'MBC Song Festival' in 2005 and is still held today at the end of the year. Whether the choice of some singers was always fair, is another matter. In the '70s, mainly trot singers appeared in the show, but in the '80s, some ballad singers attended partially, and not until the '90s belonged trot singers to the minority of participants. This can be meaningful evidence that showed the popularity of trot in the '70s. A research sums up 59 songs that were presented in a weekly music program on TV as well as in the aforementioned festival in the '70s, also shows the same result. But trot was no longer the only popular music genre in the '70s. With the proliferation of mass media, contemporary folk music from the United States slowly found its audience as well as performers, who led since the '80s one of the mainstreams of popular music in South Korea.

"With You" (님과 함께, 1972)
This trot song is among Nam Jin's most famous songs, composed in quadruple meter and sung cheerfully.

"Turning Waterwell" (물레방아 도는데, 1973)
The song, composed in quadruple metre, shows, Na Hun-a's skillful use of vibrato and Kkeokk-ki.

From the late 1960s to the mid-'70s, two singers took trot's stage: Nam Jin and Na Hun-a. They were indeed the first pop idols in South Korea. The rivalry of both was so awesome that predominantly female fans were formed on two fronts. Nam Jin was the first to hold his own concert in 1971 in Korean popular music history, which was then called 'recital'—actually a term for classical music rather than popular music. From the '80s, while Nam Jin could barely release hit songs like before, Na Hun-a released hit songs up to the 2000s, and his fans can still look forward to his sold-out concert in 2019. The two have very different vocal styles. Nam Jin often sang in a lilting mood. Some of his hit songs are rhythmically 'unorthodox' for trot, e.g. "Darling, Please Don't Change" sounds like mimetic rock and roll. Na Hun-a, on the other hand, sang throughout in 'orthodox' style for trot, often using the extended vibrato with wonderful Kkeokk-ki technique. Na's big advantage, of course, was that he was one of the few trot singers-songwriters to write songs exactly according to his style. Their representative hit songs in the '60s–'70s are:

Hit trot songs of Nam Jin

- "Heartbreakingly" (가슴 아프게, 1967)
- "Because Mind Is Good" (마음이 고와야지, 1967)
- "Love Me Once Again" (미워도 다시 한번, 1968)
- "With You" (님과 함께, 1972)
- "Darling, Please Don't Change" (그대여 변치 마오, 1973)
- "If I Had A Lover" (나에게 애인이 있다면, 1973)

Hit trot songs of Na Hun-a

- "Love Is A Seed Of Tears" (사랑은 눈물의 씨앗, 1968)
- "I Wanna Live In Gangchon" (강촌에 살고 싶네, 1969)
- "Woman At The Beach" (해변의 여인, 1971)
- "Hometown Station" (고향역, 1972)
- "Turning Waterwell" (물레방아 도는데, 1973)
- "Rusted Railroad" (녹슬은 기차길, 1976)

In the second half of the 1970s, some singers appeared who were not trot familiar, but just with trot songs were popular. Among them, Kim Hun was successful with "Leaving Me Behind, Arirang" (나를 두고 아리랑, 1975), Cho Yong-pil with "Come Back To Busan Harbor" (돌아와요 부산항에, 1975), Choi Heon with "Leaves Of Paulownia" (오동잎, 1976), Song Dae-gwan with "Suddenly, Sunny Day Comes" (쨍하고 해 뜰 날, 1976), Yun Su-il with "But Never Want To Love" (사랑만은 않겠어요, 1977) and others. Most of them had previously engaged in a rock band—at that time, such band was called 'group sounds', based on the Japanese model. Some critics sometimes refer to the music of these artists as 'Trot-go-go' or 'rocker's Ppong'. Called 'Trot-go-go' because go-go had primarily been introduced and popularized as dance music in the 1970s in Korea, and at the same time, many so-called Go-go night dance clubs opened in Seoul, where the above-mentioned singers with their group sounds worked. Called 'rocker's Ppong' because group sounds as a rock band funnily enough performed Ppongjjak. After all, Trot-go-go has contributed to the enrichment of trot by combining style, which is based on the traditional duple or quadruple metre scheme, with the syncopation elements of dance music.

Cho Yong-pil's "Come Back To Busan Harbor" was noteworthy in that it suddenly made him a star from a hitherto unknown musician. The popularity of this song could be explained by the political context because the visit of the living in Japan Koreans who belonged to the pro North Korea association 'Jochongnyeon', just in 1975 was allowed: the brothers returned from abroad back to Busan—that's what the song screamed! (Note: p. 59 "The South Korean government had not openly permitted such visits until that time in part because some of the Korean Japanese were socialists or communists originally from North Korea. However, as the South Korean regime began to have closer relations with Japan, South Korea had to lift the ban on Japanese visits. The resurrection of t'ûrot'û, initiated by Cho Yong-P'il's "Torawayo Pusanhange" (Come back to Pusan Harbor), was one of the cultural manifestations of this political transformation.") In fact, the song itself became so popular later to make the Japanese enka singers aware of this song—several cover versions of enka singers are on YouTube. Meanwhile, after the success of this song, Cho did not seriously himself concern with trot music but instead turned to his actual musical domain alternative rock and pop ballads. Cho soon got into difficulty. In 1975, a 'marijuana scandal' occurred; 18 popular artists—mostly singers from group sounds including Cho and Shin Jung-hyeon—were rebuked for cannabis consumption and banished from public and private broadcastings several years.

=== 1980s: Challenges ===
The growing economic growth of South Korea has become noticeable everywhere in the 1980s. The young generation, called baby boomers in South Korea as well as in other countries, was coming of age. The Baby boomer cohort, born between 1955 and 1963, is the largest population in South Korea. Accordingly, the number of students in colleges up to 1990 has increased dramatically more than seven times since 1970. The increased number of students boosted on the one hand the formation of student subculture, on the other hand, the young generation faced the cultural cleavage between the desire for change and the conservative establishment and tried to adapt to the changing times. Popular music has also undergone this change and took up the challenge. Beginning at the end of the 70s, the young artists tried contemporary folk songs and pop ballads and rock genres based on the taste of the Koreans. Music halls and nightclubs offered singers with the acoustic guitar as well as group sounds to perform their works. Precisely by their subculture, even in outward appearances such as acoustic guitar, long hair, jeans, and the like, they could feel differentiated from the elder generation. It existed to provide newcomers the opportunity to meet and present their work. Two prestigious song festivals were hosted by MBC TV annually in the late 1970s, which now are not held anymore: 'College Song Festival' (1977-2012) and 'Riverside Song Festival' (1979-2001). In the '60s and '70s, the US Army clubs were the springboard from which many artists stepped forward. In the '80s, the song festivals assumed such a role. Well, trot had a hard time with this uplifting music of the baby boomers. Trot was able to hold its own still in the '80s. The popularity of cassettes proved very important for the genre and helped bring about the localization of trot music. It also helped in the invention of the sound of trot medley, which is now emblematic of contemporary Korean trot music. In 1984, a medley album "Couples-only Party" (쌍쌍파티), consisting of 21 well-known trot songs was released. It was a compilation of separated recorded songs of a female and a male singer in alternating, but not in duet, and their voice was enhanced by the acoustic echo. (Note: p. 61 "The musical characteristics of the t'ûrot'û medley include lots of echo effects, double-tracked vocals, danceable rhythm, and synthesizer-oriented small instrumentation. ... t'ûrot'û medley tapes have, thus, been commodified as an everyday part of life, particularly for working-class people.") After the extraordinary success of the first album, they recorded 4 more "Couples-only Party" cassette albums next year also with success. The five "Couples-only Party" albums contain a total of 110 trot songs. As a result, many musicians flooded the music business with about 50 albums titled 'Couples-only'. A few years later, another female singer Mun Hee-ok (문희옥) succeeded also with a trot medley album "Disco Medley In Eight Dialects" (8도 디스코 사투리 메들리, 1987). Anyway, the female singer Joo Hyun-mi was discovered—the male partner Kim Jun-gyu (김준규) was actually not a professional singer, but a composer and producer. Previously, Joo Hyun-mi had participated as a vocalist of a student band at the 'Riverside Song Festival' (1981) and won the participation prize. The success of "Couples-only Party" made her debut with her own song "Rainy Yeongdong Bridge" (비 내리는 영동교) in 1985. This debut song brought her as trot singer countrywide fame, Joo released four albums in 1985 as well as 1986 with moderate success. The 9th album "Sinsa-dong And The Man" (신사동 그 사람) in 1988 earned her 'Song of the Year Award' of KBS and MBC, the most important awards at that time in South Korea. Her singing style of this song differed from the conventional trot in that the tempo was rhythmically fast in diatonic scale: this may be influenced by the medley style. Critics call it a semi-trot. The lyrics of her songs like "Sinsa-dong And The Man", "Tears Blues" (눈물의 블루스, 1986), "Unrequited Love" (짝사랑, 1989), evoked a certain milieu of hostess clubs. (Note: p. 62 "It is a problematic image that could also conflict with the traditional image of t'ûrot'û itself, and so we should not interpret the story literally but merely consider it a caricature of the life that middle-aged people would like to have, such as might be portrayed in television dramas.") A famous entertainment district in Seoul was Sinsa-dong, which was usually called 'Yeongdong' in the 1980s and today 'Gangnam District' in great order. It may have helped to call trot 'Seongin-gayo', literally adult music.

In the '80s, also two female singers, Kim Soo-hee and Sim Soo-bong enlivened the sinking popularity of trot music. The two began their music career in the US Army club: Kim sang as a vocalist of a band 'Black Cats' and Sim worked as a drummer of a band 'Nonstop'. They are both singers and songwriters. Sim Soo-bong debuted in 'College Song Festival' in 1978 with "The Man Back Then" (그때 그 사람). It was very rare for a singer to participate in the college festival with a trot song. Although she got no prize, the song became a big hit the next year. Like the success of "Come Back To Busan Harbor", so also the hit peaking of "The Man Back Then" probably has to do with the political incident back then. The song as well as its singer drew special attention to themselves because Sim was present at the assassination of President Park in 1979. But she herself suffered from the psychic trauma. Her next hit song was "Men are Ships, Women are Harbors" (남자는 배 여자는 항구, 1984). Otherwise, she brought little hit songs. Singers like Yoyomi sing 70's and 80's trot songs along with the new songs that have a Pop sound, Trot singers are still performing on MBC.

Kim Soo-hee's career began in 1976 when she recorded her first album "Too Much" (너무합니다). After the unsuccessful debut song, she appeared as a vocalist for a band in the US Army club. "A Yoke" (멍에, 1983), "A Southbound Train" (남행열차, 1987) and "Sad Love" (애모, 1991) were breakthroughs in her career. "A Yoke" garnered above all sympathetic acceptance from those women who engaged in bars and clubs because its lyric reflected images of their quotidian hardships and solace. The imagery of this song was similar to that in Joo Hyun-mi's songs "Rainy Yeongdong Bridge" and "Sinsa-dong And The Man". "A Southbound Train" was popular at the time especially as a fight song of the professional baseball team then Haitai Tigers, comparable to "Busan Seagulls" (부산 갈매기, 1982) of Lotte Giants—the trot song "Busan Seagulls" was a one-hit wonder by Moon Seong-jae (문성재). In addition, Kim Soo-hee considered "Sad Love" her favorite song.

In 1985, a trot music program 'Golden Oldies' (가요무대), literally means 'music stage', launched by KBS TV. It accomplished a steady rapprochement to trot's listeners till this day.

=== 1990s: Decline in popularity ===
In the late 1990s, Epaksa made an extravagant attempt, calling his music 'techno-trot', a mixture of rapping, techno and dance.

1993 was a time pop music in its heyday with famous Seo Taiji and Boys. At that time, there was a unique event, "The World Is a Wonderful World", a trot song sung by expressionless Shin Shin-ae while dancing the so-called "Lee Pan-sa-pan", gained popularity and create Shin Shin-ae craze. It peaked into 3rd and 4th ranks in South Korean Music Chart.

"The World Is a Wonderful World", sung by Shin Shin-ae, is a mixture of two songs released in the 1930s. Basically, the lyrics of "The World Is a Wonderful World" sung by Kim Jung-gu in 1939, but the lyrics of "Anchhwa Storm" sung by Kim Jung-gu in 1938 have also been partially modified. In the second verse of "Anchhwa Storm", "The old man's topknot twisted and his wife's shoes ran away," was transformed into "The old man's topknot twisted and the old woman's shoes ran away."

=== 2000s–2010s: Revival ===
- Young trot singers in their twenties to thirties appeared. Male singers include Lim Young-woong (임영웅), Young Tak (영탁), Lee Chan-won(이찬원), Kim Ho-jung (singer)(김호중), Jeong Dong-won(정동원), Shin Yu(신유), Chun Jae-won(천재원), Jang Minho(장민호), and Kim Hee-jae(김희재). Female singers include Jang Yoon-jeong(장윤정), Hong Jin-young(홍진영), Yoon Soo-hyun(윤수현), Song Ga-in(송가인), Jung Mi-ae(정미애), Hong Ja(홍자), Jung Da-kyung(정다경), Kim Na-hee(김나희), Kang Hye-yeon(강혜연), Shin Mi-rae(신미래), Yoyomi(요요미), and Gong So-won(공소원).
- Singers who have been unknown for decades have seen the light (typically there is Jin Seong(진성)).
- A retro wind blew in the trot field. Legendary singers Joo Hyun-mi(주현미), Haeeunlee(First 'National sister')(혜은이, 최초의 '국민여동생'), Na Hoon-a(Emperor of Trot)(나훈아, 가황), Lee Mi-ja(Queen of Elysees)(이미자, 엘리제의 여왕), Kim Yon-ja(Queen of Trot)(김연자, 트로트의 여왕), Shim Su-bong(심수봉) and Nam Jin(남진) are drawing attention again.

==== Popular songs of 2000s~2010s ====
- 《Flower of Passion》- Kim Soo-hee (2000) (《정열의 꽃》- 김수희), 《Nest》- Nam Jin (2000) (《둥지》- 남진), 《Love Letter》- Joo Hyun-mi (2000) (《러브레터》- 주현미), 《Does anyone love you》- Tae Jin-ah (2000) (《사랑은 아무나 하나》- 태진아), 《A Woman Living Alone》- Lee Hyeri (2000) (《혼자사는 여자》 - 이혜리), 《Lonely Woman》- Jo Seung-gu (2000) (《외로운 여자》- 조승구).
- 《Finding the Stars in the Sky》- Yoo Jina (2001) (《저 하늘 별을 찾아》- 유지나), 《From Friends to Lovers》- Hyunsook (2001) (《친구에서 애인으로》- 현숙), 《You're really good》-Tae Jin-ah (2001) (《잘났어 정말》- 태진아), 《Be good when you are》- Oh Seung-geun (2001) (《있을 때 잘해》- 오승근), 《Because of You》- Bae Il-ho (2001) (《당신 때문에》- 배일호), 《Jaokah》- Park Sang-cheol (2001) (《자옥아》- 박상철).
- 《Love is not a joke》- Tae Jin-ah (2002) (《사랑은 장난이 아니야》- 태진아), 《Captive of Love》- Oh Eunjoo (2002) (《사랑의 포로》- 오은주), 《My brother is doing well》 – Hyunsook (2002) (《오빠는 잘 있단다》- 현숙), 《Beautiful and Ugly Bird》- Hyun-cheol (2002) (《아미새》- 현철), 《You More Beautiful than Flowers》- Bae Ilho (2002) (《꽃보다 아름다운 너》- 배일호).
- 《You Can't Leave》- Kim Sang-bae (2003) (《떠날 수 없는 당신》- 김상배), 《The Trendy》- Song Dae-kwan (2003) (《유행가》- 송대관), 《Bye Bye!》- Soh Myeong (2003) (《빠이빠이야》- 소명), 《You are my man》- Han Hye-jin (2003) (《너는 내 남자》- 한혜진), 《The Rope of Love》- Kim Yong-Im (2003) (《사랑의 밧줄》- 김용임).
- 《Glass Shoes》- Kim Hye-yeon (2004) (《유리구두》- 김혜연), 《Dancing Tambourine》- Hyun-sook(2004) (《춤추는 탬버린》- 현숙), 《While Living》- Lee Tae-ho (2004) (《사는 동안》- 이태호), 《Chunjaya》- Seol Un-do (2004) (《춘자야》- 설운도), 《O My!》- Jang Yoon-jeong (2004) (《어머나》- 장윤정), 《I want to try love once》- Ha Dong-jin (2004) (《사랑을 한번 해보고 싶어요》- 하동진).
- 《Zzanzzara》- Jang Yoon-jeong (2005) (《짠짜라》- 장윤정), 《Broken Wall Clock》- Na Hoon-a (2005) (《고장난 벽시계》- 나훈아), 《By chance》- Woo Yeo-ni (2005) (《우연히》- 우연이), 《Honey(Jagiya)》 – Park Joo-hee (2005) (《자기야》- 박주희), 《Unconditionally》- Park Sang-cheol (2005) (《무조건》- 박상철).
- 《Why! love》- Joo Hyun-mi (2006) (《어허라 사랑》- 주현미), 《If》- Joh hang-jo (2006) (《만약에》- 조항조), 《The Unusual Person》-Choi Yu-na (2006) (《별난 사람》- 최유나), 《Madam》- Tae Jin-ah (2006) (《아줌마》- 태진아), 《Later, later》- Jang Yoon-jeong (2006) (《이따, 이따요》- 장윤정), 《Gondre Mandre》- Park Hyun-bin (2006) (《곤드레 만드레》- 박현빈).
- 《Throwing a vote for love》 – Hyun Sook (2007) (《사랑에 한표 던진다》- 현숙), 《Falls》- Seo Ju-kyung (2007) (《쓰러집니다》- 서주경), 《The Rumored Love》- Kim Hye-yeon (2007) (《소문난 사랑》- 김혜연), 《Hwang Ji-nyi》 – Park Sang-cheol (2007) (《황진이》- 박상철), 《Only Trust Your Brother》 – Park Hyun-bin (2007) (《오빠만 믿어》- 박현빈), 《Shrewd》- Baek Su-jeong (2007) (《깍쟁이》- 백수정).
- 《Love You》- Joo Hyun-mi, Cho PD (2008) (《사랑한다》- 주현미,조PD), 《Please be patient》 – Kim Hye-yeon (2008) (《참아주세요》 - 김혜연), 《You Are My Love》 – Hyun Sook (2008) (《그대는 내사랑》 - 현숙), 《Shabang Shabang》 – Park Hyunbin (2008) (《샤방샤방》- 박현빈), 《At Andong Station》- Jin Seong (2008) (《안동역에서》- 진성), 《The Sleeping Princess》- Shin Yu (2008) (《잠자는 공주》- 신유), 《Clock Hands》- Shin Yu (2008) (《시계바늘》- 신유), 《A Millennial》- Yu Jin-pyo (2008) (《천년지기》- 유진표).
- 《That's Right》- Sung Jin-woo (2009) (《딱이야》- 성진우), 《ZZarazazza》- Joo Hyun-mi, Seo Hyun (2009) (《짜라자짜》- 주현미, 서현), 《Lies》- Joh Hang-jo (2009) (《거짓말》- 조항조), 《Love Battery》- Hong Jin-young (2009) (《사랑의 배터리》- 홍진영), 《No Catch》- Moon Yeon-joo (2009) (《잡지마》- 문연주), 《Red Pepper》 – Yu Ji-na (2009) (《고추》- 유지나), 《A Sincere Heart》 – Geum Jan-di (2009) (《일편단심》- 금잔디)

=== Contemporary political use of trot music ===
An article published in the Chosun Ilbo in 2010 reported the government's use of trot music as a propaganda tool against North Korea. Over 184 songs from artists such as Na Hun-a, Jang Yoon-jeong and Park Hyun-bin, were broadcast through FM radio programs targeting North Korean soldiers.

=== 2020s: Resurgence ===
In recent years, trot, a genre traditionally associated with older generations in Korea, has experienced a significant resurgence, gaining widespread popularity among younger audiences and evolving within the broader music industry. The TV Chosun show Mr. Trot has played a key role in revitalizing trot and introducing it to younger audiences. Stars like Lim Young-woong, who surpassed 10 billion streams on Melon and won two grand prizes at the 2022 Melon Music Awards, have helped bring the genre into the mainstream. Major K-pop companies, like SM Entertainment, are now blending trot with K-pop, as seen in the debut of groups like Mytro, aiming to appeal to both domestic and international audiences.

== See also ==
- Music of South Korea
- Culture of South Korea
- Lovers of Music (drama series about an aspiring trot singer)
