= Jo Mingyu =

South Korean singer

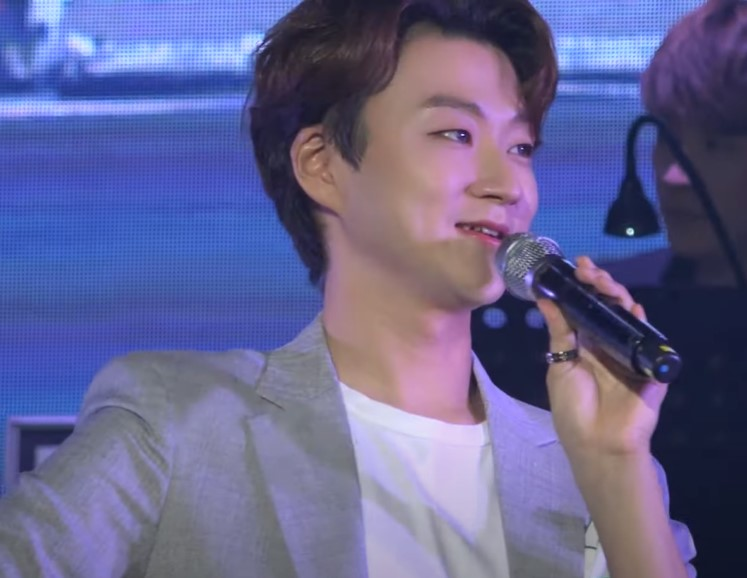
- Jo in 2019
- Born: November 19, 1990 (age 35); Taebaek, South Korea
- Agent: Beat Interactive (group) Parana Ent (solo)
- Musical career
- Genres: classical; crossover
- Occupation: Singer
- Years active: 2017–present
- Member of: Forestella

Korean name
- Hangul: 조민규
- RR: Jo Mingyu
- MR: Cho Min'gyu

Jo Mingyu, often spelled Cho Minkyu (born 19 November 1990) is a South Korean opera singer, the leader and leggero tenor of crossover vocal group Forestella. He was discovered during Phantom Singer 2, a televised talent reality show in 2017.

== Life and career ==
Jo Mingyu was born in Taebaek, his mother was a kindergarten teacher, while his father taught at the Taebeak Mechanical Technical High School. He started learning music from a very young age, upon the wishes of his mother, who dreamt of being a singer. She supported both of her children to learn music, Jo's older sister studied piano. In 1998, the family moved to Chuncheon. After his sister stopped playing the piano in 2004, Jo's mother turned her full attention to the musical education of her son, which he considers to be a turning point in his life.

In 2006, he was admitted to Seoul Arts High School, then in 2009, he started his education at Seoul National University, studying vocal music. He participated in several singing competitions, where he became a semi-finalist, finalist or winner. In 2011, he became the youngest finalist of the DongA Music Competition. That year he lent his singing voice to actor Lee David in the war film The Front Line.

During this period, he became unsure of his future, as he failed to win several competitions and received harsh criticism. In 2013, he decided to further his studies at Seoul National University's graduate school. Here, he found new inspiration under the supervision of opera singer and university professor Kwangchul Youn. He also gave singing lessons at the university dorm. He started working for the Seoul Metropolitan Opera and participated in various stages.

In 2015, he was a semi-finalist at the Montreal International Musical Competition, after which he started his compulsory military service as a conscripted policeman. In 2016, at the Geneva International Music Competition, he was told he would not be able to get lead singing roles in opera, due to his light leggero tone. This shook his view of his future and considered quitting singing when he came across the first season of Phantom Singer and decided to apply for the second season. He thought crossover music might be a viable solution for his voice type.

During the competition, Jo selected Ko Woo-rim for the 2nd round of the competition and trained him. Then, he selected Bae Doo-hoon for the 3rd round of the competition to add variety to the team color. In the final competition, Kang Hyung-ho joined the team. Jo Mingyu got the nickname "Strategist" during the competition because he meticulously considered each contestant's timbre and whether they would match his voice before selecting them.

His first solo single, titled "Sinsegye: New Age" (신세계: New Age) was released in February 2020. In December 2021, he released his first minialbum, Sinsegye: Parana (신세계: Parana), followed by a two-day solo concert in Seoul.

== Voice ==
Jo defines his voice type as a leggero tenor, because of which he was told he would not be able to play lead roles in opera. During the audition to Phantom Singer 2, composer and producer Yoon Sang described Jo's voice as "the most unique voice I have heard among tenors", and also added that he had never seen such a "young and delicate tenor timbre" before and found it "incredibly amazing". Singer Bada called it "attractive", while Michael K. Lee said "there is something free and easy about the way you sing, like the sun's coming out. It's really lovely". Kim Mun-jeong musical director called his tone "refreshing" and praised his expressive performance.

== Discography ==
Extended plays

- Sinsegye: Parana (신세계: Parana) (2021)

Singles

List of singles, showing year released, chart positions, and album name
| Title | Year | Peak chart positions | Album |
| Title | Year | KOR | Album |
|---|---|---|---|
| "Sinsegye: New Age" (신세계: New Age) | 2020 | — | Non-album single |
| "Baram" (바람) | 2021 | — | Sinsegye: Parana |
| "Recuerdos de Buenos Aires" | 2024 | 191 | Non-album singles |
| "A Christmas Symphony" | 2024 | 184 | Non-album singles |
