= Hymn of Seoul =

1969 song by Patti Kim

Hymn of Seoul (Korean: 서울의 찬가) is a song performed by South Korean singer Patti Kim. This song is a symbol of Seoul. The song was released on 1969.

== See also ==
- Hymn of Busan
