= Music of Korea =

Music of Korea may refer to:

- Traditional music of Korea
- Music of North Korea
- Music of South Korea

== See also ==
- K-pop
