= Music of South Korea =

The music of South Korea has evolved over the course of the decades since the end of the Korean War, and has its roots in the music of the Korean people, who have inhabited the Korean Peninsula for over a millennium. Contemporary South Korean music can be divided into three different main categories: Traditional Korean folk music, popular music, or K-pop, and Western-influenced non-popular music.

== Traditional music ==
Korean traditional music is also known as Gugak (national music). The first evidence of Korean music appeared in the extant text of Samguk sagi (History of the three kingdoms) in 1145, which described two string-like instruments; Gayageum and Geomungo. Traditional Korean music was brought to heights of excellence under the kings of the Joseon dynasty between 1392 and 1897. During the Joseon period, a social hierarchy was observed with the King and the yangban (government officials, generals, and the elite) at the top and the sangmin (merchants, craftsman) and slaves at the bottom. There were two forms of music: jeongak (court music) and minsokak (folk music). Jeongak was the music category that the yangban listened to for enjoyment and was played during state rituals like banquets, military processions, etc. However, minsokak and nongak (farmer's music) dominated among the common people. The different types of folk music were: pansori, pungmulnori, and minyo (folk songs). Pansori became definite in the seventeenth century and gained respect over time. It is now considered as the ideal traditional music in contemporary South Korea. Pansori requires a solo singer as well as a drummer. This type of music contains body language, emotions, and sounds observed in nature. Pungmulnori is traditional Korean percussion music with the sound of drums standing out. As for minyo, it was enjoyed by commoners while nongak was played during agrarian festivals. Folk songs were not specific; as in, the features varied among different regions. The most famous folk song of South- and North Korea is "Arirang". The popularity of this song sky-rocketed after it was sung solo at the screening of a silent nationalistic film produced by Na Woongyu in 1926. There are several regional variations of this song.

However, the Joseon Dynasty came to an end after Japan's successful war against China (1894–1895) and Russia (1904–1905) which ultimately took over the Korean peninsula. Japan then controlled the major levers of politics, economics, and culture in Korea. During this period, the Japanese did not impose gagaku (the Japanese imperial court music) but European art music instead. Western music education soon became a part of the Korean educational curriculum for the elite and included choral singing and playing instruments. Hence, the Japanese and Korean elites embraced Western music; thereby neglecting Gugak. However, to avoid going extinct Gugak adapted the western style of music. In the 1900s, Pansori gave rise to a new genre influenced by western music called Changga (choral song/theater) which gave way to musical theaters and opera. Since Western music was not accessible to the common people, two different cultural groups arose; one where the elite listened to the government-imposed western music and as for the commoners, traditional music. This led to a new generation, often termed as 'modernized', who were accustomed to listening to Western music.

Since the early 2000s, there have been continuous attempts by traditional musicians to combine Gugak with popular music genres, which soon became known as "Fusion Gugak" (퓨전국악). Following the viral success of band LEENALCHI's "Tiger Is Coming" (범 내려온다) being featured in the Korean Tourism Organization's "Feel the Rhythm of Korea" video advertising series with Ambiguous Dance Company in 2020, interest in the genre increased. Fusion gugak survival shows like JTBC's "Captain of Poong-New" and MBN's "Chosun Pan Star" soon emerged, with many highly respected musicians within the Gugak scene participating as contestants and judges.

== Western influenced music ==
Western influenced Korean music is also sometimes referred to as popular music and is seen in the early twentieth century. The western influence in South Korean music gave rise to new genres; some of which are Changga and Yuhaengga.

Changga arose from Pansori but became increasingly popular in the early twentieth century for its fusion of European anthems, American hymns, Western folk tunes, and Japanese choral music. Though it had Western melodies, the lyrics were in Korean. The most well-known example of changga is the song "My Darling Clementine".

Yuhaengga (which literally means popular songs) is also known as shin gayo (new song). It became a part of everyday life in urban Korea in the mid–1920s as well as a crucial element of the term "modern".

== Mainstream popular music ==
Popular Korean music, often referred to as K-pop in English, is a highly commercial industry throughout World. The dominant trend in popular Korean music is currently "idol" (아이돌) groups, though far from all Korean popular music artists are idols. Idol groups typically feature several entertainers of the same gender who perform a fusion of dance music, rhythm and blues, funk, hip-hop and electronic influenced songs. Contemporary Korean music and K-pop stars are very popular across Asia, and the spread of contemporary Korean culture designated a word to reflect this fact. The Korean Wave, or Hallyu (한류), is the word used to discuss the influence of contemporary Korean popular culture on the rest of Asia, and the rest of the world.

=== Genres ===
==== Trot ====
Oppaneun punggakjaengi
(오빠는 풍각쟁이; lit. Older brother is a street musician)
A 1938 trot song by Kim Song-gyu and Park Yeong-ho. Sung by Park Hyang-rim.

Trot, pronounced as "teuroteu" in Korean (sometimes called ppongjjak (뽕짝), due to its distinctive background rhythm), is the oldest form of Korean pop music. It was developed in the years before and during World War II around the early 1900s. Well-known interpreters of this genre are Lee Mi-ja, Bae Ho, Nam Jin, Na Hoon-a, Joo Hyun-mi. Rock musicians such as Cho Yong-pil also performed this type of music. In contemporary South Korea, it has enjoyed a revival at the hands of Jang Yoon Jeong, who recorded the popular trot songs "Jjan-jja-ra" (Korean: 짠짜라) and "Eo-meo-na" (Korean: 어머나).

==== Rock ====
Rock music is said to have spread to Korea from the Eighth United States Army (EUSA) bases after the Korean War. Shin Jung-hyeon, frequently referred to as the "Godfather of Korean Rock," got his start playing popular rock covers for American servicemen in the 1950s, particularly being noted for his take on Iron Butterfly's In-A-Gadda-Da-Vida. Shin developed his style of psychedelic rock in the '60s and '70s and recorded albums with several bands, such as the Add 4, the Men, and the Yup Juns, and wrote songs and played on albums for well-known singers, such as Kim Chu Ja and Jang Hyun, and lesser known singers, like Kim Jung Mi. After refusing an order from then-president Park Chung Hee to write a song praising the president, Park banned Shin's music and ultimately imprisoned him for marijuana possession. The imprisonment of Shin slowed the production of Korean rock, but other artists, most notably Sanulrim emerged during the late '70s, before dance music came to dominate Korean popular music in the '80s.

In the 1980s, popular musical tastes had moved away from rock music. The scene was dominated by heavy metal music, in particular Boohwal, Baekdoosan, and Sinawe, collectively known as the Big 3.

Rock music was revived in the early '90s with democratization following the presidency of Roh Tae-woo. As information flowed more freely into the country, Korean youths were exposed to decades of popular foreign music in a short period, and some began to form bands. Two of the earliest bands were Crying Nut and No Brain, which introduced the country to a variety of new genres in a localized blend called "Chosun Punk," spearheaded by indie label Drug Records which also managed Club Drug. With increased globalization and access to the Internet, the music scene diversified and incorporated more styles of music. The late '90s saw increasing diversity in musical influences, as younger bands like Rux emerged and The Geeks introduced Korea to straight edge hardcore punk.

==== Folk ====
T'ong guitar is a form of Korean folk and folk rock music developed in the early 1960s and '70s. It was heavily influenced by American folk music, and artists in the genre were considered Korean versions of American folk singers, such as Joan Baez and Bob Dylan.

Notable early Korean folk musicians include the American-educated Hahn Dae-soo, and Kim Min-ki. Hahn and Kim recorded socially and politically conscious folk songs, and both artists had their music censored and banned by the autocratic Park Chung Hee government, much as the psychedelic rock guitarist Shin Jung-hyeon had his songs censored and banned. Despite the government's efforts to censor political music, though, popular folk songs increasingly came to be used as rallying cries for social change within Korea, leading to the term norae undong (노래운동), or literally, "song movement," being coined to describe songs targeted at social change. As South Korea was transitioning to democracy in 1987, the late folk musician Kim Kwang-Seok was noted for being politically active, and his songs were popular at democratic rallies.

==== Hip-hop ====
In South Korea, hip hop expanded into a cultural phenomenon in Seoul, Busan and Daegu. The movement has been growing since the mid-90s, especially after the success of Seo Taiji and Boys' smash hit "Nan Arayo" (난 알아요, "I Know") and has been gaining attention internationally, as Koreans have won various championships around the world since the early 2000s. In 2004, Rain released his It's Raining album, making him one of the first international stars outside of South Korea. Aside from mainstream hip-hop, there is also an underground hip-hop scene that has developed throughout South Korea. Online webzines have contributed to spreading the culture into the Korean mainstream. Since the mid-2010s and the success of the Mnet hip-hop competition TV show "Show Me The Money", the popularity of hip hop in Korea has skyrocketed, and the lines between mainstream and underground hip hop have become increasingly blurred.

"K-hip-hop" is now the most popular music genre among young Koreans and has garnered a growing international following as well.

==== Ballad ====
Influenced by Western melodies and the sentimental ballad, ballad-style songs were initially introduced into the mainstream market in the 1960s. The Korean ballad style of music rose into popularity in the 1980s to become a staple genre in modern Korean music. Its song style is meant to capture the feelings of love, unrequited love, or heartbreak. Many official soundtracks (OSTs) for popular Korean dramas contain slow, dramatic ballad songs that are played whenever important plot points occur. Balladeers are behind the main theme songs for many dramas such as Winter Sonata, Guardian: The Lonely and Great God, and My Girlfriend Is a Nine-Tailed Fox.

==== Hybridization ====
The music genre primarily changed from ballad to Western music styles, including rap, reggae, R&B, and hip hop in the early twenty–first century. K-pop music has experienced the process of hybridization as it was influenced by the globalized Western music genres. The term hybridization refers to local cultures creating unique combinations incorporating foreign and globalized influences. Other than hybrid music genres of K-pop, English mixing in the lyrics of K-pop is another important change in contemporary K-pop music culture. According to Jin and Ryoo, K-pop has incorporated diverse stylistic input from abroad which has been related to the boom of hybrid K-pop through a Korean–English mix in lyrics. Instead of providing beautiful melodies, K-pop idols also try to maximize melody lines with easy English lyrics. Korean entertainment companies have developed the mixing language of English into lyrics because it is easier for foreigners to remember the song.

== Independent popular music ==
Independent popular music, such as "indie rock," or indie (인디), and independent hip hop, is growing in popularity in Korea, fueled by an increase in the number of independent acts, as well as an increase in the coverage of those independent acts by blogs. Notable popular indie groups from the 1990s and 2000s include Jaurim (자우림), Huckleberry Finn (허클베리 핀), Nell (넬), Mot (못), Cherry Filter (체리 필터), and Third Line Butterfly (3호선 버터플라이), as well as the more recent Busker Busker, among others.

== Classical music ==
Handel's Messiah, HWV 56 - XLIV. Hallelujah
Performed by the National Chorus of Korea at the Seoul Arts Center Concert Hall

With the arrival of Western culture in South Korea, European classical music has been significantly popular in the Korean music scene. The genre has produced a number of preeminent classical musicians such as Yiruma. The fine range of Korean symphonic orchestras have been bolstered by notable performers and soloists, as well as highly skilled orchestra directors. Internationally known Korean composers of classical music include such notables as Yi Suin, who specializes in music for children, and is known for the famous "Song of My Homeland".

Another of Korea's internationally prominent composers is Young-ja Lee. She was born in 1931 in Wonju and studied at the Conservatoire de Paris and the Royal Conservatory of Brussels. She continued her education at the Manhattan School of Music. Lee endured hardships during the Japanese occupation and Korean War, but emerged to become one of the dominant forces in Korean music in the 20th century.

Hyo-Won Woo was born in 1974 and wrote mainly Christian choral music, for example Gloria, using elements of both traditional Korean music and contemporary classical music.

== Korean contemporary Christian music ==
With the importation of Christianity, the evangelical use of music for proselytizing has led to many choirs, both within and without churches, and the importation of traditional American styles of Christian folksongs sung in Korean.

== Western and traditional crossover ==
Korean traditional instruments have been integrated into western percussion, and are beginning a new wave of Korean world music since 1998. Traditional instruments are amplified, and sampled, with traditional songs rescored for new demographics and regions.

== See also ==
- Korean Wave
- Contemporary culture of South Korea
- List of South Korean musicians
- Opera in South Korea
