= Hymn of Busan =

Hymn of Busan (부산찬가) is a song performed by South Korean singer Yoon Sinae. This song is a symbol of Busan. This song is Lotte Giants, Busan I'Park FC's cheer song. This song can be heard portion of Busan Subway Line 1's city hall Station. The song was released on 1984.

== See also ==
- Hymn of Seoul
