= Opera in South Korea =

Along with the exchange and dissemination of cultures, opera was introduced into South Korea in the early 20th century. In recent years, South Korea has synchronized with the international opera market and introduced popular works from London's West End and New York's Broadway. Many first-class theaters and productions have trained many opera singers. Actors whose talent has recently been recognized by overseas production teams have also begun to enter the international stage.

== History ==
The origins of Korean opera can be traced back to the early 20th century, when South Korea began to introduce Western culture and opera became part of it. The development of opera in Korea has undergone several stages, including the introduction, localization, and prosperity stages.

=== Introduction stage ===
Opera was first introduced to Korea in January 1948, with a production of Verdi’s La traviata titled Chun Hee in Korean held at the Sigongkwan Theatre (now Myeongdong Theatre) in central Seoul. South Korea's opera performances mainly imported classic works from Europe and the United States, such as Turandot and La bohème.

=== Localization stage ===
During the localization phase South Korea began to create opera works suitable for the tastes of local audiences, which incorporated traditional Korean musical elements. When Koreans first adopted the international opera tradition in the 1950 production of Chunhyang, they chose their own stories. Composer Hyun Jae-myung used Western styles to compose music and orchestral orchestration and conducted opera performances himself. It can be said that everything is international except the subject matter. Of course, the costumes and sets are Korean.

=== Prosperity stage ===
Korean opera audiences prefer to see Carmen, La traviata, and La bohème, but the government has changed its strategy and promoted original operas. Even independent original opera creation plans. Now, many young composers and screenwriters are planning large-scale productions, funded by the government's Ministry of Culture, Sports and Tourism. More and more Koreans are beginning to enjoy opera and have more opportunities to watch and participate in opera performances.

== Performance style ==
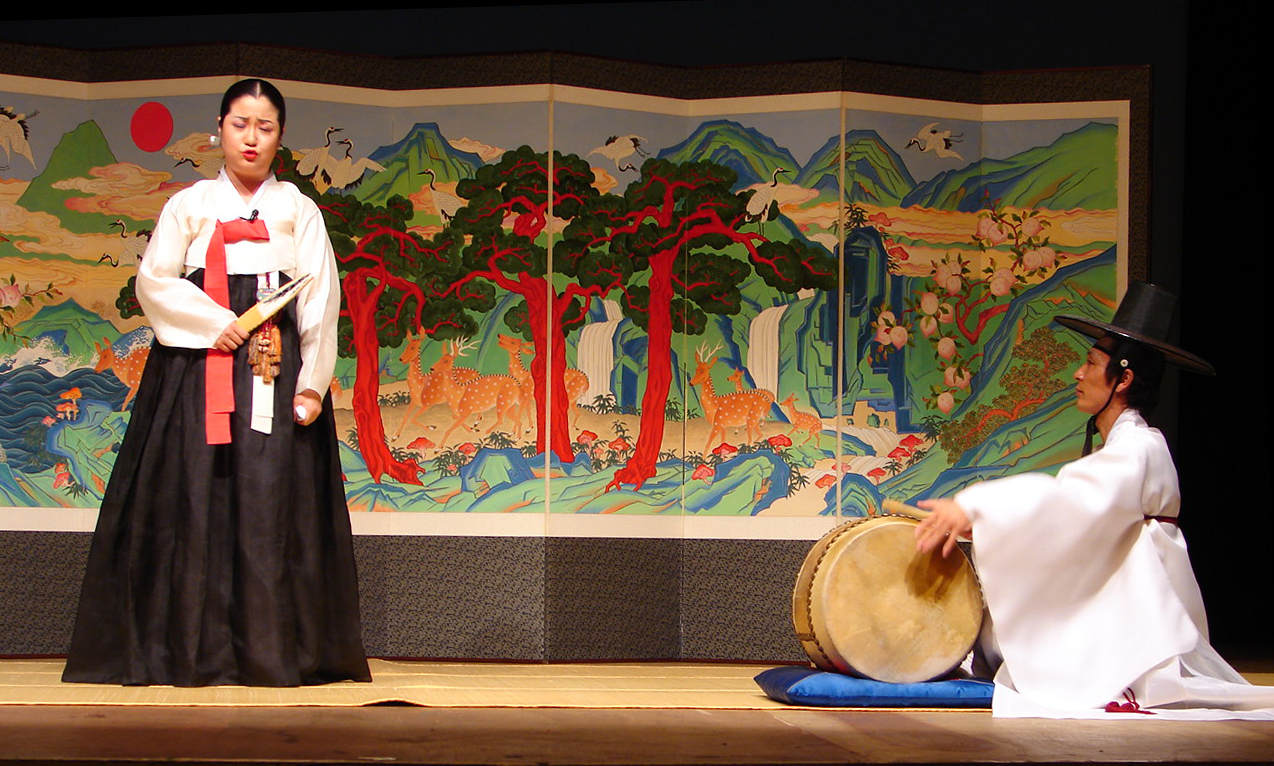
Pansori performance

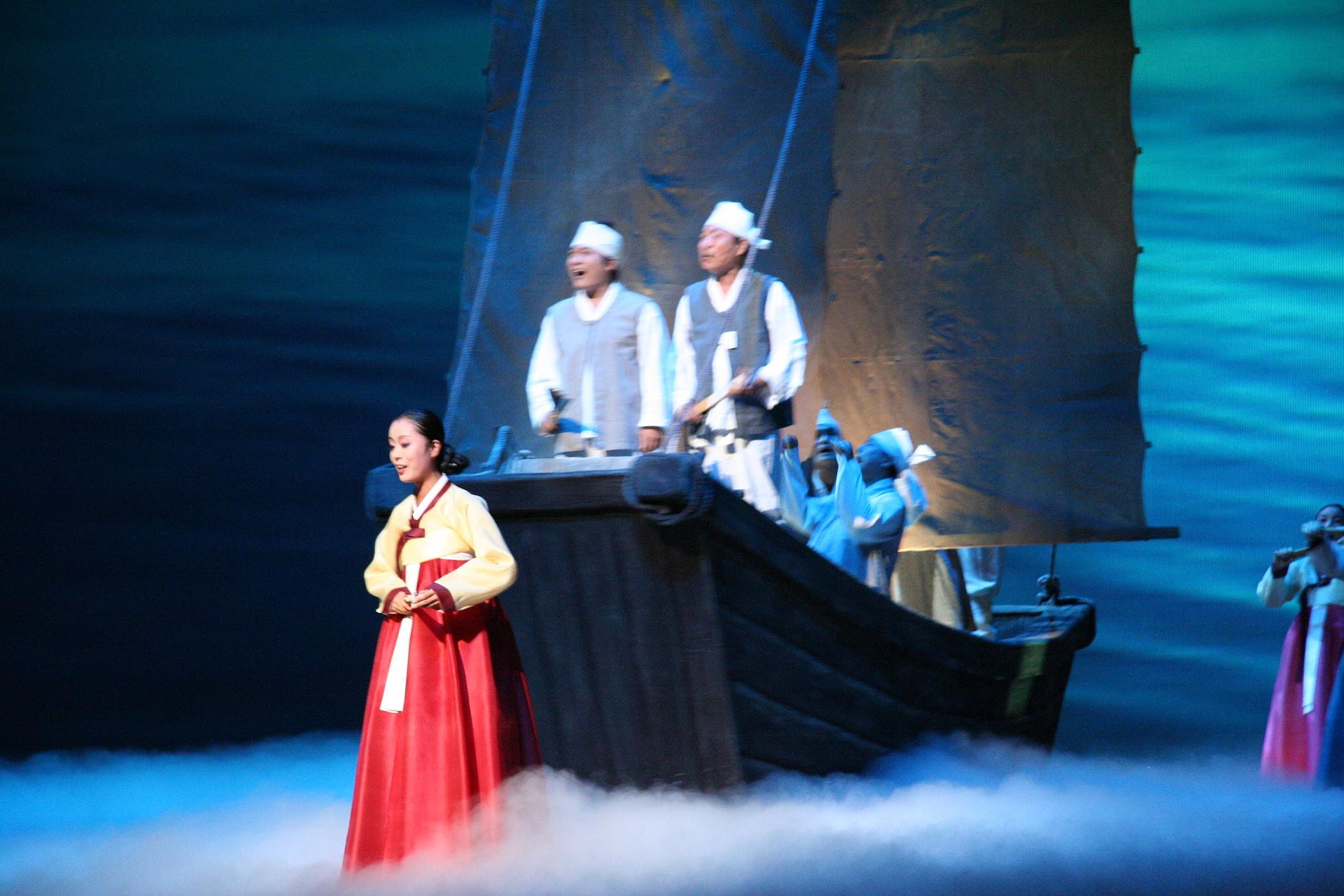
Changgeuk performance

There are two separate stage genres, both of which are also known locally as "opera". One of them is very old and traditional, called pansori. And another genre, from a near-old time maybe a hundred years ago, is called changgeuk. Changgeuk is a form of sung drama that evolved from pansori storytelling. "Chang" means "singing" and "geuk" means "drama". So it is a "music-drama" like Wagner. Pansori is one of the traditional Korean folk art, its melody is delicate and sad, the voice is husky and deep, full of Korean national spirit and cultural beliefs. Its performance is a sitting lying drum, a standing singing, singing while speaking, singing mainly. In 1964, the Korean government designated pansori as the fifth important intangible cultural property. In 2003, UNESCO included pansori in the Representative List of the Oral and Intangible Cultural Heritage of Humanity.
