= Kang Hyung-ho =

South Korean singer

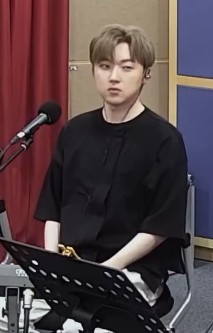
- Kang in June 2022
- Born: March 8, 1988 (age 38); Busan, South Korea
- Agent(s): Arts & Artists
- Spouse: Jung Min-kyung (m. 2024)
- Musical career
- Genres: K-pop; crossover; rock
- Occupation: Singer
- Years active: 2017–present
- Label: Universal Music Korea
- Member of: Forestella

Korean name
- Hangul: 강형호
- RR: Gang Hyeongho
- MR: Kang Hyŏngho

Kang Hyung-ho (Korean: 강형호; born March 8, 1988), also known by his stage name Pitta (stylized in all caps), is a South Korean singer and member of the crossover quartet Forestella. A former chemical engineer, Kang had been an amateur singer and rose to fame after participating in the singing competition Phantom Singer 2.

== Early life ==
Kang is a native of Busan. He aspired to be a musician since childhood but his parents had been against it. Instead, he focused on his studies and was admitted to Pusan National University on a scholarship, eventually graduating with a degree in chemical engineering.

After completing his mandatory military service and graduating from college, he worked for Lotte BP (now Lotte Ineos) in research and development. During his tenure at Lotte, he co-authored at least one chemical patent. He co-authored several research papers, as well.

== Singing career ==
While juggling his career at a major corporate company, Kang continued to pursue his musical interests as the main vocalist and guitarist with PITTA, a rock band he had formed together with his friends as college students. They continued to play even after graduating and working. In 2016, they gained local celebrity status after winning the Busan Employees' Band Competition for amateur musicians.

=== Phantom Singer ===
Kang heard about JTBC holding auditions for the second season of Phantom Singer and decided to apply. Of the 32 contestants who passed the preliminary screening, he was the only one without any formal training in singing or the performing arts. He sang "The Phantom of the Opera" for the televised audition in front of the panel of judges and sang Christine Daaé and the Phantom's parts himself in both the countertenor and his natural tenor registers. The video uploaded to Naver went viral immediately and garnered several million views by the final. Initially he commuted back and forth between Seoul and Busan during filming but ultimately took a year-long sabbatical from his job with the option of returning should Phantom Singer 2 not work out.

=== Debut with Forestella and solo activities ===
Prior to the final of Phantom Singer 2, Kang was grouped together with Bae Doo-hoon, Cho Min-kyu and Ko Woo-rim to form Forestella. He had never been grouped with any of the other members up until the random quartet stage. They eventually won the competition and debuted on March 14, 2018.

Kang signed as a solo artist with Arts & Artists, which had also managed Forestella as a group until June 2021. In October 2020, he made his debut release with the digital single "Universe" under the stage name PITTA. It was the name of the band had been part of from his amateur days and he chose to use it as a homage to his members. In November 2021, he released the self-composed extended play ID: PITTA, his first non-single release as a solo artist.

He participated in various televised music competitions, like King of Mask Singer, where he was eliminated in the first round, but showcased a wide vocal range. He finished 5th overall in the celebrity singing competition Lotto Singer, despite receiving the highest score from judges.

In May 2024, he released his second EP titled New Normal Life.

== Personal life ==
On April 13, 2024, Kang married Busan MBC weathercaster Jung Min-kyung, whom he started dating prior to Phantom Singer 2.

== Discography ==
=== Studio albums ===
Title	Album details	Peak chart positions	Sales
Title	Album details	KOR	Sales
Be Free	Released: April 19, 2023; Label: Arts & Artists, Universal Music Korea; Format: CD, digital download	36	KOR: 11,340

=== Extended plays ===
Title	EP details	Peak chart positions	Sales
Title	EP details	KOR	Sales
ID: Pitta	Released: November 10, 2021; Label: Arts & Artists, Universal Music Korea; Format: CD, digital download; Track listing: 1. "The Nation"; 2. "Be the One"; 3. "Persona"; 4. "Prayer"; 5. "Icarus"; 6. "Not Alone"	26	KOR: 6,780
New Normal Life	Released: May 16, 2024; Label: Arts & Artists; Format: CD, digital download; Track listing: 1. "Apollon"; 2. "Don't Be Quiet"; 3. "G.T.H.O."; 4. "Newness"; 5. "Better"; 6. "This Song"	19	KOR: 12,980

=== Singles ===
Title	Year	Peak chart positions	Album
Title	Year	KOR	Album
"Universe"	2020	— (Note: "Universe" did not enter the Gaon Digital Chart, but peaked at position 88 on the Gaon BGM Chart.)	Non-album singles
"Dandelion"	2021	— (Note: "Dandelion" did not enter the Gaon Digital Chart, but peaked at position 97 on the Gaon BGM Chart and position 89 on the Gaon Download Chart.)	Non-album singles
"The Nation"	2021	— (Note: "The Nation" did not enter the Gaon Digital Chart, but peaked at position 44 on the Gaon BGM Chart and position 72 on the Gaon Download Chart.)	ID: Pitta
"Carpe Diem"	2023	—	Be Free
"Wave on the Sea" (해무) (featuring Dawool Park)	2024	165	Non-album single
"G.T.H.O."	2024	185	New Normal Life
"—" denotes releases that did not chart or were not released in that region.
