= Bae Ho =

South Korean singer (1942–1971)

- Born: April 24, 1942; Shandong, China
- Died: November 7, 1971 (aged 29) Seoul, South Korea
- Genres: Trot
- Occupation: Singer
- Years active: 1963–1971

Korean name
- Hangul: 배신웅
- Hanja: 裵信雄
- RR: Bae Sinung
- MR: Pae Sinung

Stage name
- Hangul: 배호
- Hanja: 裵湖
- RR: Bae Ho
- MR: Pae Ho

Bae Ho (Korean: 배호; April 24, 1942 – November 7, 1971) was a South Korean singer, known as the "Elvis of Korean trot." A statue commemorating his biggest hit, "Turning around at Samgakji (돌아가는 삼각지)" stands in front of Samgakji Station in Seoul.

== Early life ==
Bae was born Bae Sin-ung (Korean: 배신웅) in Shandong, China, the son of Korean independence activist Bae Gook-min. He moved to what would become South Korea with his family in 1945 following the end of the Japanese occupation.

== Career ==
Bae debuted as a singer in 1963. His popularity grew after the 1967 release of his song "Turning around at Samgakji" (돌아가는 삼각지), which topped music charts for five consecutive months. He ultimately released about 300 songs.

In 1966 he fell ill with nephritis and spent his last years battling the disease. He died in 1971.
