= Patti Kim (singer) =

South Korean singer

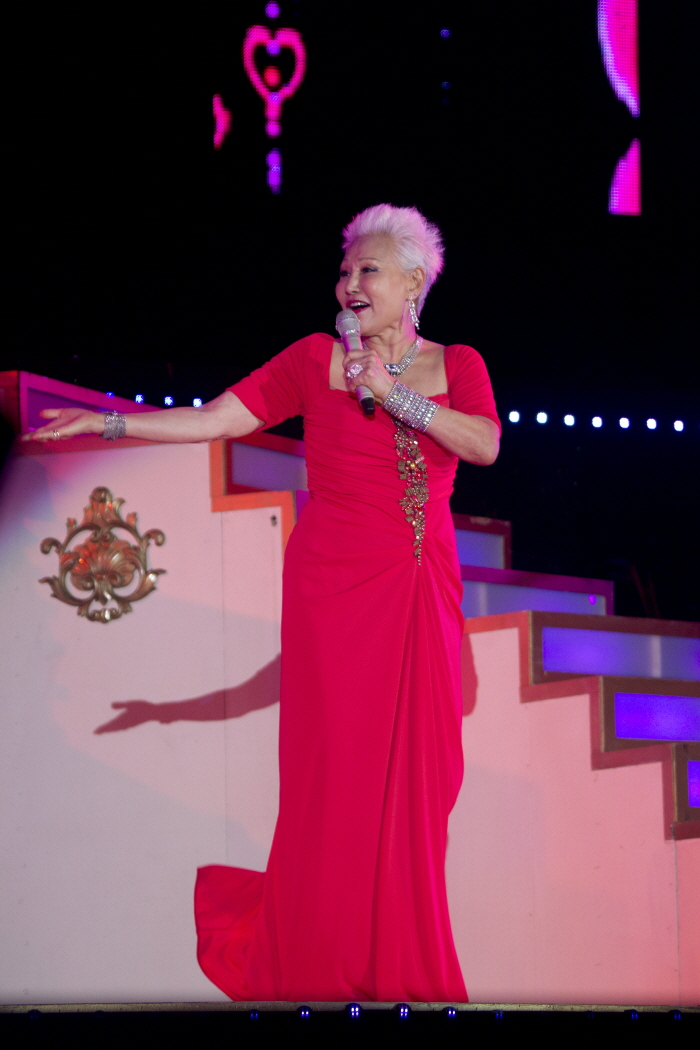
- Patti Kim in 2012

Background information
- Born: Kim Hye-ja; February 28, 1938 (age 88); Seoul, Korea
- Genres: Pop
- Occupation: Singer
- Years active: 1959–2013

Korean name
- Hangul: 김혜자
- Hanja: 金惠子
- RR: Gim Hyeja
- MR: Kim Hyeja

Kim Hye-ja (Korean: 김혜자; Hanja: 金惠子; born February 28, 1938), better known by her stage name Patti Kim (Korean: 패티 김), is a South Korean singer. She debuted in 1959 and "ruled the country's entertainment scene" in 1960s and 1970s. She was the first South Korean singer to perform in Japan (following the end of the Japanese occupation of Korea). She also performed in Las Vegas on The Johnny Carson Show. Kim retired in 2013.

== Career ==
In 1959, one year after Kim graduated from Seoul Jungang Girls' High School, she debuted as a singer at a stage of the Eighth United States Army. In 1963, as a recommendation by composer, Park Chun-seok, Kim sang Pledge of Love (Sarangui maengse), an adapted song of Till and gained a popularity. In the same year, she got a chance to sing at a stage in Las Vegas, United States. With the collaboration with Gil Ok-yun, a renowned composer and her first husband, Kim announced a lot of hit songs, and albums including "Sawori gamyeon" (literally, Once the April is gone), "Sarangui changa" (Song in praise of Love), "Saranghaneun Maria" (Dear Maria), "Motiteo" (Don't forget you). During the marriage until 1972, they produced about 70 albums, and 500 to 600 songs.

In 1978 Patti Kim became the first Korean pop singer to perform on the Sejong Center stage, which only allowed for classical musicians at that time. In 1989, she had a performance in Carnegie Hall, New York City. In 1996, she was honored the prestigious Hwagwan Cultural Merit by the South Korean government as the third singer after Kim Jeong-gu, and Lee Mi-ja.
