= Lee Mi-ja =

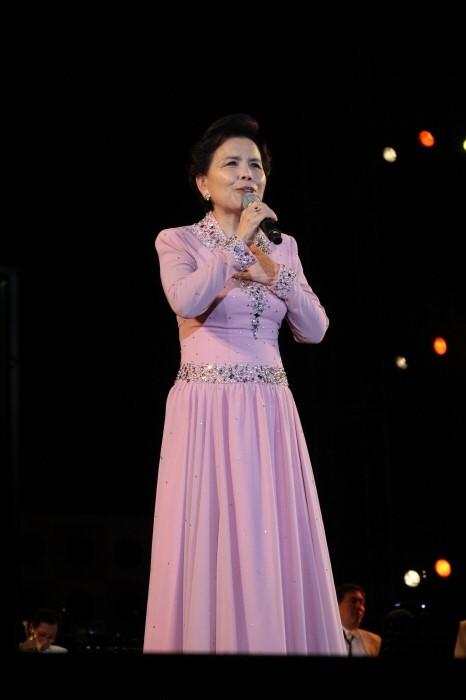
- Lee in 2014
- Born: October 30, 1941 (age 85); Keijō, Keiki-dō, Korea (today Seoul, South Korea)
- Occupation: Singer
- Years active: 1959–present
- Honours: Geumgwan Order of Cultural Merit (2023)
- Musical career
- Genre: Trot

Korean name
- Hangul: 이미자
- RR: I Mija
- MR: I Mija

Lee Mi-ja (Korean: 이미자; born October 30, 1941) is a South Korean singer. She is widely considered the most influential trot singer in Korean music history. Lee debuted in 1959 and rose to stardom with her 1964 best-selling song, "Camellia Girl." She has released over 500 albums during her career and is known as the "Queen of Elegy," after one of her most popular songs. In 2002, she became one of the first South Korean singers to perform in North Korea.

== Accolades ==
=== Awards ===
- 2013 MBC Entertainment Awards – Achievement Award

=== State honors ===
Name of country, year given, and name of honor
Country	Organization	Year	Honor or Award	Ref.
South Korea	Korean Popular Culture and Arts Awards (Note: Honors are given at the Korean Popular Culture and Arts Awards, arranged by the Korea Creative Content Agency and hosted by the Ministry of Culture, Sports and Tourism. They are awarded to those who have contributed to the arts and South Korea's pop culture.)	2013	Eungwan Order of Cultural Merit	
South Korea	Korean Popular Culture and Arts Awards	2023	Gold Crown Cultural Medal	
