= Lee Dong-hwi =

South Korean actor (born 1985)

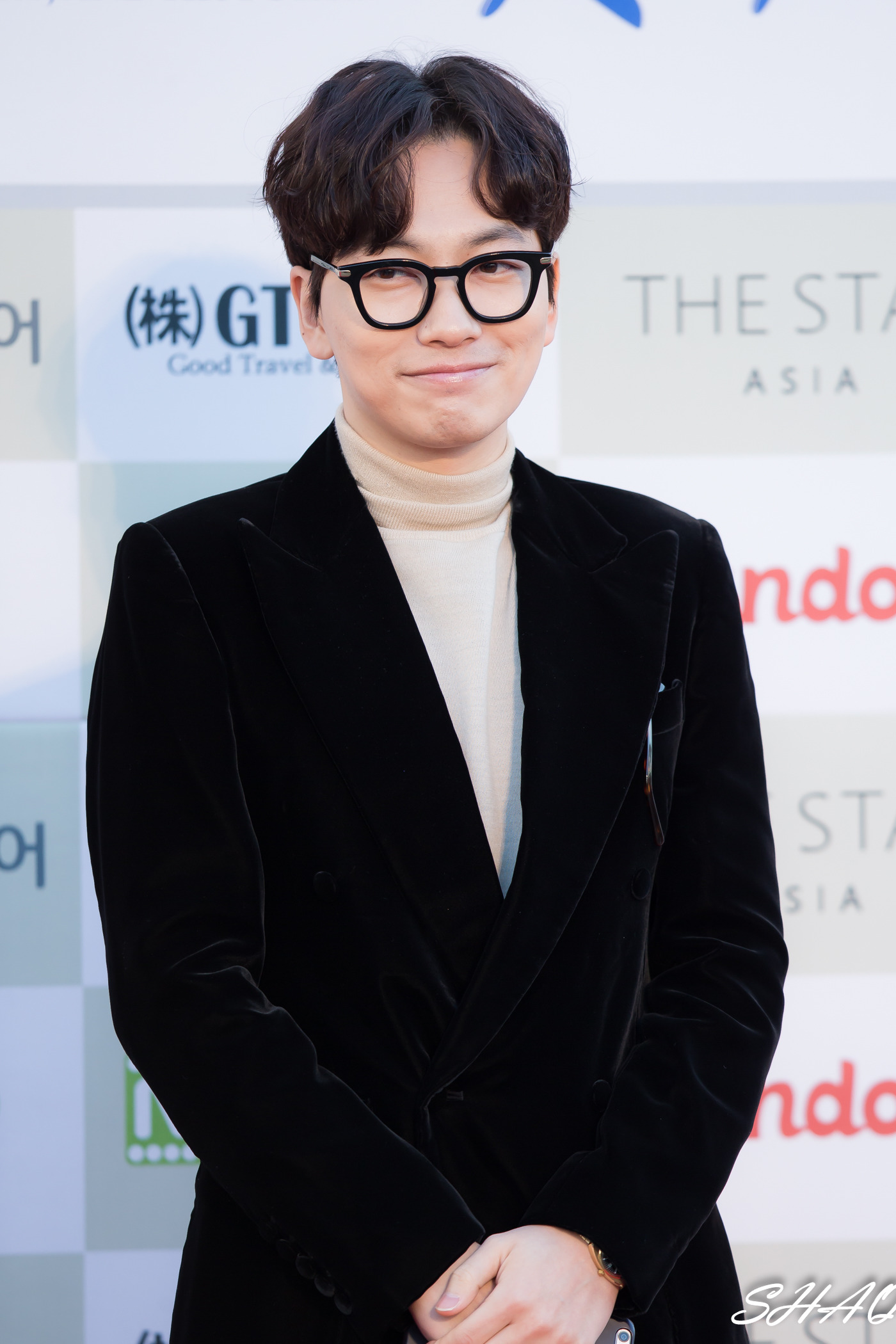
- Lee in 2016
- Born: July 22, 1985 (age 41); Gangdong-gu, Seoul, South Korea
- Education: Seoul Institute of the Arts
- Occupations: Actor; singer
- Years active: 2013–present
- Agent: Company On

Korean name
- Hangul: 이동휘
- RR: I Donghwi
- MR: I Tonghwi

Lee Dong-hwi (born July 22, 1985) is a South Korean actor and singer who first gained recognition through his roles in the television series Reply 1988 (2015–2016) and Entourage (2016). He achieved further attention for starring in the feature film Extreme Job (2019), comedy series Pegasus Market (2019), and crime drama Chief Detective 1958 (2024). Lee is a member of the South Korean supergroup MSG Wannabe.

== Early life and education ==
Growing up, Lee loved drawing cartoons and dreamed of becoming a cartoonist. Although he was an introvert at home, he was outgoing with friends, with whom he would spend hours chatting. Feeling limited by his drawing skills, he began to wonder, "What if I tried expressing this with my body?" This thought inspired him to pursue acting. He then enrolled in the Theater Department at the Seoul Institute of the Arts in 2005.

== Career ==
=== 2013–2014: Beginnings ===
Lee made his debut at the age of 28 with Yim Soon-rye's film Run to the South. He has since appeared with films such as Way Back Home (2013) and Tazza: The Hidden Card (2014).

=== 2015–2020: Breakthrough and rising popularity ===
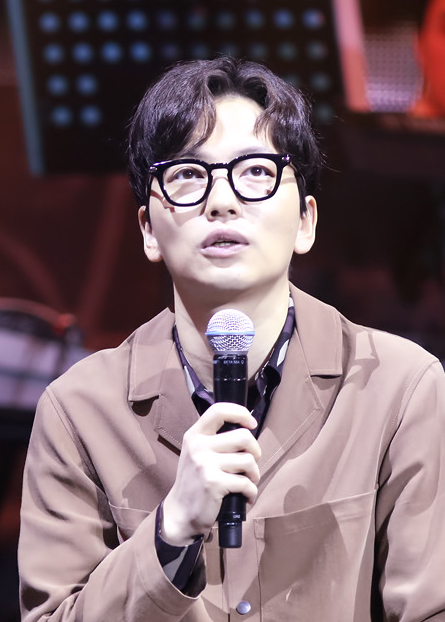
Lee in March 2016

Lee achieved breakthrough with the retro drama Reply 1988 (2015–2016). He went through an audition where he danced and sang a rendition of Jeong Soo-ra's "Joy". Additionally, he imitated the voices of Lee Sun-kyun, Park Hee-soon, Jang Hyuk, and Yoo Hae-jin to get the part. This was followed with a role in the film Veteran (2015). He then starred in Chang You-jeong's comedy-drama film The Bros (2017) and crime-thriller film One Line (2017).

With his performance in the film Extreme Job (2019), he further received attention for his memorable characters. The same year, Lee got his first starring role in television as Moon Seok-goo in tvN drama Pegasus Market, a television series based on Kim Gyu-sam's webtoon of the same name. It aired on tvN every Friday at 23:00 (KST) from September 20 to December 6, 2019.

=== 2021–present ===
On November 30, 2020, KeyEast announced that Lee signed an exclusive contract with the label. In May 2021, Lee was reported to be one of the members of the supergroup MSG Wannabe and its sub-unit JSDK. In December 2023, Lee signed an exclusive contract with Company On.

== Personal life ==
Lee was in a relationship with model-actress Jung Ho-yeon from 2015 until November 2024.

He is part of a celebrity group of friends known as BYH48 consisting of other actors and singers. The name was coined by fans and is a parody of Japanese idol group AKB48.

== Other ventures ==
=== Endorsements ===
Following the success of the drama Reply 1988, Lee became a sought-after model in the advertising industry since 2016. He became the face of a chicken advertisement, a role typically reserved for the popular stars. Showcasing his lively and humorous charm, Lee became advertising model for companies such as LG U+ (telecommunications), K5 (automobiles), Banky (finance), and Ferricana. In addition, he received attention for his excellent fashion sense through his SNS and won the Awesome Swagger Award at the Style Icon Awards Asia in 2016.

=== Philanthropy ===
Lee has been actively engaged in philanthropic efforts through the Hope Bridge Korea Disaster Relief Association. (Note: The Hope Bridge Korea Disaster Relief Association is a non-profit organization established in 1961. It was founded by newspaper companies, broadcasting companies, and social organizations to assist individuals affected by unforeseen disasters. Originally known as the "Korea Flood Damage Response Committee," it initially focused on providing financial aid for the victims of Typhoon Sarah in 1959. In 1964, the organization was renamed the "Korea Disaster Response Association" to expand its relief efforts and promote a culture of donation within society. In 2001, with the amendment of the Disaster Relief Act, The Hope Bridge Korea Korea Disaster Relief Association became the only relief organization in the country authorized by the government to raise and distribute donations for domestic natural disasters.) On March 8, 2022, he donated ₩10 million to support those affected by the extensive wildfires that began in Uljin, Gyeongbuk, and spread to Samcheok, Gangwon. Later, on August 18, 2022, he contributed an additional ₩10 million to aid victims of the 2022 South Korean floods.

== Filmography ==
=== Film ===
Year	Title	Role	Notes	Ref.
2013	Run to the South	Cafe member 1		
2013	Cold Eyes	Parrot		
2013	Queen of the Night	Male employee 1		
2013	Way Back Home	Gwang-sik		
2014	Animal	Soo-yong		
2014	No Tears for the Dead	Electric vehicle engineer		
2014	Tazza: The Hidden Card	Worth		
2014	Fashion King	Duo man 2		
2015	The Beauty Inside	Sang-baek		
2015	Veteran	Yoon Hong-ryeol		
2015	The Sound of a Flower	Chil-sung		
2016	The Handmaiden	Mr. Goo		
2016	Luck Key	Min-seok	Cameo	
2017	Confidential Assignment	Park Myung-ho		
2017	One Line	Senior Manager Song		
2017	New Trial	Mo Chang-hwan		
2017	The Bros	Lee Joo-bong		
2019	Extreme Job	Young-ho		
2019	My First Client	Jung-yeob		
2019	Exit	Central police 1	Cameo	
2020	Somewhere in Between	Gi-tae		
2020	The Call	Baek Min-hyun		
2021	New Year Blues	Yong-chan		
2021	Unframed – Blue happiness		Short film	
2022	Broker	Song	Cameo	
2022	Another Record: Lee Je-hoon	Lee Dong-hwi	Documentary	
2023	Maybe We've Broken Up	Jun-ho		
2023	Dr. Cheon and Lost Talisman	Kang Do-ryung / Inbae		
2023	Can We Get Married?	Han Seon-woo		
2024	The Roundup: Punishment	Jang Dong-cheol		
2024	The Plot	Hauser		
2024	Method Acting	Lee Dong-hwi		
2025	Lobby	Park Yong-hoon		
2025	Hi-Five	Doctor Go	Cameo	

=== Television series ===
Year	Title	Role	Notes	Ref.
2014	Gunman in Joseon	Han Jung-hoon		
2015	Divorce Lawyer in Love	Lee Kyung		
2015–2016	Reply 1988	Ryu Dong-ryong		
2016	Red Teacher	Kim Tae-nam	Drama special	
2016	Entourage	Geo-book (Turtle)		
2017	Radiant Office	Do Ki-taek		
2019	Pegasus Market	Moon Seok-goo		
2020	SF8	Jung Ga-ram	Episode: "Manxin"	
2022	Glitch	Lee Si-kook		
2022–2023	Big Bet	Jeong-pal	Season 1–2	
2024	Chief Detective 1958	Kim Sang-soon		
2025	Low Life	Sim Hong-gi		

=== Television shows ===
Year	Title	Role	Ref.
2024–2025	Rented in Finland	Cast member	
2025–2026	Reply 1988 10th Anniversary	Cast member	

=== Web shows ===
Year	Title	Role	Notes	Ref.
2021	Orange Tag	Host		
2022	Saturday Night Live Korea	Host	Season 2 – Episode 5	
2023	Bromarble	Cast Member	with Yoo Yeon-seok, Lee Seung-gi, Jo Se-ho, Ji Seok-jin, Kyuhyun, Joshua and Hoshi	

=== Radio shows ===
Year	Title	Role	Notes	Ref.
2022	Bae Chul-soo's Music Camp	Special DJ	August 11–12	

=== Music videos ===
Year	Title	Ref.
2025	"Hyehwa-dong (or Ssangmun-dong)"	

=== Music video appearances ===
Year	Song Title	Artist	Ref.
2021	"Hobby"	Parc Jae-jung	
2021	"Sunny Today"	KCM	
2022	"Do You Want to Hear" (듣고 싶을까)	MSG Wannabe MOM	

== Discography ==
=== Singles ===
Title	Year	Album
"Journey To Atlantis" (상상더하기) (with MSG Wannabe)	2021	MSG Wannabe Top 8 Performance Songs
"Resignation" (체념) (with Kim Jung-min, Simon Dominic, Lee Sang-yi)	2021	MSG Wannabe Top 8 Performance Songs
"Only You" (나를 아는 사람) (with Kim Jungmin, Simon Dominic, Lee Sangyi)	2021	MSG Wannabe 1st Album
"I Love You" (난 너를 사랑해) (with MSG Wannabe)	2021	MSG Wannabe 1st Album
"Keep your head up" (네가 아는 너)	2021	Non-album single

=== Soundtrack appearances ===
List of soundtrack appearances, showing year released, and name of the album
Title	Year	Album
"Hyehwa-dong (or Ssangmun-dong) (혜화동 (혹은 쌍문동))" (Ssangmun-dong Kids featuring Lee Dong-hwi)	2025	Reply 1988 10th Anniversary OST

== Accolades ==
=== Awards and nominations ===
Year presented, name of the award ceremony, award category, nominated work and the result of the nomination
Year	Award	Category	Nominated work	Result	Ref.
2016	InStyle Star Icon	New Generation Actor Award	Reply 1988, The Sound of a Flower	Nominated	
2016	8th Style Icon Asia	Awesome Swagger	—N/a	Won	
2016	11th Max Movie Awards	Best Supporting Actor	The Beauty Inside	Nominated	
2016	52nd Baeksang Arts Awards	Best New Actor (TV)	Reply 1988	Nominated	
2016	9th Korea Drama Awards	Best New Actor	Reply 1988	Nominated	
2016	1st tvN10 Awards	Scene-Stealer Award, Actor	Reply 1988	Nominated	
2016	16th Korea World Youth Film Festival	Rookie Award	Reply 1988	Won	
2016	30th KBS Drama Awards	Best Actor in a One-Act/Special/Short Drama	Drama Special – Red Teacher	Won	
2016	2nd Fashionista Awards	Best Fashionista	—N/a	Nominated	
2017	6th Korea Top Star Awards	Popular Star Award	The Bros	Won	
2017	2017 MBC Drama Awards	Excellence Award, Actor in a Miniseries	Radiant Office	Nominated	
2021	8th Wildflower Film Awards	Best Actor	Somewhere in Between	Nominated	
2021	21st MBC Entertainment Awards	Best Teamwork Award	Hangout with Yoo	Won	
2023	2nd Blue Dragon Series Awards	Best Supporting Actor	Big Bet	Won	

=== Listicles ===
Name of publisher, year listed, name of listicle, and placement
Publisher	Year	Listicle	Rank	Ref.
The Screen	2019	2009–2019 Top Box Office Powerhouse Actors in Korean Movies	39th	
