= Hangout with Yoo =

South Korean reality television show

- Promotional poster
- Hangul: 놀면 뭐하니?
- Lit.: How Do You Play?
- RR: Nolmyeon mwohani?
- MR: Nolmyŏn mwŏhani?
- Genre: Reality; Variety
- Presented by: Yoo Jae-suk; Haha; Joo Woo-jae; Heo Kyung-hwan; Former: Jeong Jun-ha; Shin Bong-sun; Mijoo; Park Jin-joo; Lee Yi-kyung
- Country of origin: South Korea
- Original language: Korean
- No. of episodes: 321+ 1 Pilot (list of episodes)

Production
- Producers: Kim Tae-ho (ep. 1–122); Park Chang-hoon (ep. 123–189); Kim Jin-yong and Jang Woo-sung (ep. 190–present)
- Production location: South Korea
- Running time: 85 minutes
- Production company: MBC Entertainment

Original release
- Network: MBC TV
- Release: July 27, 2019 – present

Hangout with Yoo (Korean: 놀면 뭐하니?; RR: Nolmyeon mwohani?) is a South Korean reality/variety show broadcast by MBC TV. It premiered on July 27, 2019, and airs on Saturdays at 18:30 (KST).

== Synopsis ==
This is a show that was started in order to find out what Yoo Jae-suk would be doing during his days off. Subsequently, the show showcases Yoo (and currently, with six new fixed cast members) taking on various projects, with him taking on various secondary roles.

=== Segments ===
Listed in this article are some of the major segments.

Current segment
- 1995 MBC Seoul Song Festival: The segment is a music festival special centered on the music industry of the early 1990s and is a follow-up to the '80s MBC Seoul Music Festival.
Former segments
- Camera Relay: PD Kim Tae-ho will first pass the camera to Yoo and from there the camera relay continues by passing to the next celebrity until the camera's storage is full. Different celebrities will be using the camera to record what they will be doing during their days off.
- Yoo-plash: Yoo, as Yoo-go Starr, learns to play the drums. He is taught to play a drum beat, and this beat sample he played would then be spread out to various singer-songwriters and producers to further work on it, adding accompaniment by accompaniment as the relay goes on until a complete song is produced. This segment showcases the producing of numerous songs, which began from the drum sample, and eventually the drum recital where Yoo performs the songs together with the artists involved.
- Bbong For Yoo: Yoo debuts as a trot singer under the stage name Yoo San-seul (유산슬). This segment showcases all the activities he had taken part as a rookie trot singer.
- Life Ramyeon: Yoo, as YooRaSek, handles a ramyeon restaurant, serving ramyeon that he cooked to celebrities, while sharing heart-to-heart talks.
- Indoor Concert: Yoo, as Yoo Sam, goes to recruit various acts and then host an indoor concert, without any audience. This project was initiated at the last minute due to the current 2020 coronavirus pandemic in South Korea.
- Chicken Doctor Yoo: Yoo, as Chicken Doctor Yoo, makes Korean fried chicken, the reason being many shops selling it have been shutting down due to the current 2020 coronavirus pandemic in South Korea. A continuation of this project, named Saturday Saturday Chicken, was done, as Yoo and several celebrities work together to operate a fried chicken drive-through for only 100 cars.
- Summer X Dance X Yoo Jae-suk (later named SSAK3): Yoo, taking the stage name U-Doragon, forms a co-ed trio SSAK3 (싹쓰리) with Lee Hyo-ri and Rain, and the trio made their debut on July 25, 2020. This project was done due to ballads dominating the music charts even in the summer, which PD Kim Tae-ho thought to be not the usual as the past, when upbeat dance songs (typically by co-ed groups) were popular in the season.
- Refund Sisters: Yoo, as Jimmy Yoo, becomes the producer of the special 4-member girl group Refund Sisters (환불 원정대), who made their debut on October 10. This is a spin-off from Lee Hyo-ri naming Uhm Jung-hwa, Jessi and Hwasa (Mamamoo) as the members she want in her dream girl group during the SSAK3 segment.
- H&H Corporation: H&H stands for "Heart & Heart". Yoo, as Yoo Pang, together with Kim Jong-min and Defconn, picks several stories from people who want to show their hearts, but find it difficult to speak out, to their intended recipients. He then contacts, either through video call or visiting personally, and deliver these stories in place of the senders to these intended recipients.
- Winter Songs Resurrection Plan: Yoo plans to find songs with the feeling of winter, and invite artists to recreate performances of the songs live for the special. The reason is that for some reasons, in this winter season, songs with the winter feeling could not be heard in the streets of Korea.
- Variety Investor (later named 2021 Live And Fall Together): Yoo, as Canola Yoo, finds celebrities who have potential to become variety stars, together with Kim Jong-min and Defconn. Eventually, the program "Live And Fall Together", which was hosted by Yoo, returns after 20 years.
- MSG Wannabe: Yoo, as Yoo Yaho (who is the twin brother of Jimmy Yoo), finds potential members among male celebrities to produce the male vocal group MSG Wannabe, which is a name parody of vocal trio SG Wannabe. Eventually, the final MSG Wannabe lineup consists of 8 members, and two sub-units are also formed: M.O.M (Jee Seok-jin, KCM, Wonstein, Parc Jae-jung) and JSDK (Kim Jung-min, Simon Dominic, Lee Dong-hwi, Lee Sang-yi).
- Hangout With Yoo+: Jeong Jun-ha, Haha, Lee Mi-joo and Shin Bong-sun appear as semi-fixed cast members to join Yoo in taking on newer projects. The quartet have subsequently become fixed cast members of the show beginning episode 124.
- Acorn Festival: Yoo, Haha and Mijoo formed a project trio Toyote (토요태), a parody of Koyote, after the trio's cover of Freestyle's "Y" received huge responses. The festival focuses on songs that charted very well on Cyworld BGM Chart, and their singers.
- WSG Wannabe: Yoo, as Yoo Pal-bong (who is a distant relative of Jimmy Yoo and Yoo Yaho), finds potential members among female celebrities to produce the female vocal group WSG Wannabe, which would be the female counterpart of MSG Wannabe. Eventually, the final WSG Wannabe lineup consists of 12 members, and three sub-units are also formed: Gaya-G (Lee Bo-ram, Soyeon (Laboum), Hynn, Jung Ji-so; under Antenna's Yoo Pal-bong and Yoo Mijoo), Sa-Fire (Navi, Sole, Eom Ji-yoon, Kwon Jin-ah; under QuanMujin's Big Ul & Hip Ul), and Oasiso (Yoon Eun-hye, Kota (Sunny Hill), Park Jin-joo, Jo Hyun-ah (Urban Zakapa); under SiSo's Elena Kim & Shin Mina).
- JMT: Yoo is a director at JMT (Joy & Music Technology) after leaving Infinite Company. This segment is known as the continuation of Infinite Company, which is an unscripted skit that parodied on the lives of office employees, and was one of the more well-known segments of Infinite Challenge.
- Throwaway Entertainment (later named JS Entertainment): Throwaway Entertainment was formed with female duo JuJu Secret (Mijoo and Park Jin-joo) and male group One Top (Yoo Jae-suk, Haha, Jo Se-ho, Yang Se-hyung, Yoo Byung-jae, Lee Yi-kyung, Hwang Kwang-hee, and formerly Nam Chang-hee). They will continue producing the groups depending on the public's vote of "GO" or "STOP."

== History ==
On January 12, 2022, MBC announced PD Kim Tae-ho will resign on January 17, 2022. He left MBC after 21 years of ending with 'Acorn Festival' aired on January 15, 2022. PD Park Chang-hoon, who directed Omniscient Interfering View, was selected as Kim Tae-ho's successor. On June 5, 2023, MBC announced that Jeong Jun-ha, Shin Bong-sun, and PD Park Chang-hoon would leave the show. Assistant PDs Kim Jin-yong and Jang Woo-sung took over as main PDs beginning the July 1, 2023, episode following a 2-week break.

== Philanthropy ==
On December 28, 2022, the show will donate 1.79 billion won from broadcasting in 2022 to 14 organizations in need.

== List of episodes ==
Year	Episodes	Originally released	
Year	Episodes	First released	Last released
2019	23	July 27, 2019	December 28, 2019
2020	50	January 4, 2020	December 26, 2020
2021	46	January 2, 2021	December 18, 2021
2022	47	January 1, 2022	December 31, 2022
2023	48	January 7, 2023	December 30, 2023
2024	46	January 6, 2024	December 28, 2024
2025	43	January 11, 2025	December 27, 2025
2026	TBA	January 3, 2026	TBA

== Discography ==
=== Yoo-plash ===
This album was released as a compilation of all the artists who participated in the making of Yoo-plash segment.

Yoo-plash, released on October 19, 2019
No.	Title	Lyrics	Music	Artist	Length
1.	"How Do You Play?" (놀면 뭐해?; Nolmyeon mwohae?; 'What do you do when you play?')	Boi B; Gaeko; Choiza; Geegooin; Gray; Crush; Wonstein; Mommy Son; Zior Park; Sam Kim	Yoo Jae-suk; You Hee-yeol; Yoon Sang; Lee Sang-soon; Jukjae; Gray; Crush; Sam Kim	Boi B; Gaeko; Choiza; Geegooin; Gray; Crush; Wonstein; Mommy Son; Zior Park; Sam Kim	3:51
2.	"Tic Tae Toe" (눈치; Nunchi; 'Sense')	Paul Kim; Heize; Peakboy	Yoo Jae-suk; Lee Juck; Sunwoo Jung-a; Jeong Dong-hwan; Lee Tae-yoon; Paul Kim; Heize; Peakboy; Yang Hye-seung; Hong Jun-ho	Paul Kim; Heize; Peakboy	3:50
3.	"Please Distress Me + It's Not That I Can't" (날 괴롭혀줘 + 못한 게 아니고; Nal goerophyeojwo + mothan ge anigo; 'Please don't tease me + it's not that I can't do it')	Hwang So-yoon; Sumin	Yoo Jae-suk; Sunwoo Jung-a; Yun Seok-cheol; Lee Sang-min; Han Sang-won	So!Yoon!; Sumin	3:32
4.	"This Is Music"	UV; Jo Hyun-ah	Yoo Jae-suk; UV; Yoo Joon-sung; Jo Hyun-ah; Mo'i	UV; Urban Zakapa	3:55
5.	"Confused" (헷갈려; Hetgallyeo)	Kim Eana; Zion.T; Colde	Yoo Jae-suk; You Hee-yeol; Yoon Sang; Lee Sang-soon; Jukjae; Colde	Zion.T; Colde	2:56
6.	"How Do You Play?" (instrumental)				3:51
7.	"Tic Tae Toe" (instrumental)				3:50
8.	"Please Distress Me + It's Not That I Can't" (instrumental)				3:32
9.	"This Is Music" (instrumental)				3:55
10.	"Confused" (instrumental)				2:56
Total length:					36:08

=== Bbong for Yoo ===
These songs were released through the Bbong for Yoo segment.

Bbong for Yoo, released on November 6, 2019
No.	Title	Lyrics	Music	Artist	Length
1.	"Hapjeong Station Exit 5" (합정역 5번 출구; Hapjeongyeok 5beon chulgu)	Lee Gun-woo; Yoo San-seul	Park Hyun-woo	Yoo San-seul	3:07
2.	"Redevelopment of Love" (사랑의 재개발; Sarangui jaegaebal)	Kim Eana	Jo Young-soo	Yoo San-seul	3:14
3.	"Hapjeong Station Exit 5" (instrumental)				3:07
4.	"Redevelopment of Love" (instrumental)				3:14
Total length:					12:42

"Redevelopment of Love 2", released on January 4, 2020
No.	Title	Lyrics	Music	Artist	Length
1.	"Redevelopment of Love 2" (사랑의 재개발 2; Sarangui jaegaebal 2)	Kim Eana	Jo Young-soo	Yoo San-seul	3:05
2.	"Redevelopment of Love 2" (instrumental)				3:05
Total length:					6:10

"Farewell Bus Stop", released on March 28, 2020
No.	Title	Lyrics	Music	Artist	Length
1.	"Farewell Bus Stop" (이별의 버스 정류장; Ibyeorui beoseu jeongnyujang; 'Bus stop of farewell')	Yoon Myung-sun	Yoon Myung-sun; Hae Gu	Yoo San-seul; Song Ga-in	3:37
2.	"Farewell Bus Stop" (instrumental)				3:37
Total length:					7:14

=== Indoor Concert ===
This song was released through the Indoor Concert segment.

Hangout with Yoo Indoor Concert, released on April 4, 2020
No.	Title	Lyrics	Music	Artist	Length
1.	"As I Say" (말하는 대로; 2020 version)	Yoo Jae-suk	Lee Juck	Sagging Snail (Yoo Jae-suk and Lee Juck)	3:41
Total length:					3:41

=== SSAK3 and Refund Sisters ===
These songs were released through the SSAK3 and Refund Sisters segments.

"In Summer" (by SSAK3) released on July 11, 2020
No.	Title	Lyrics	Music	Artist	Length
1.	"In Summer" (여름 안에서 by SSAK3; featuring Hwang Kwang-hee)	Lee Hyun-do	Lee Hyun-do	SSAK3	4:41
2.	"In Summer" (instrumental)				4:41
Total length:					9:22

"Beach Again", released on July 18, 2020
No.	Title	Lyrics	Music	Artist	Length
1.	"Beach Again" (다시 여기 바닷가)	Linda G; Zico	Lee Sang-soon	SSAK3	3:54
2.	"Beach Again" (instrumental)				3:54
Total length:					7:48

"Play That Summer", released on July 25, 2020
No.	Title	Lyrics	Music	Artist	Length
1.	"Play That Summer" (그 여름을 틀어줘)	Shim Eun-ji	Shim Eun-ji	SSAK3	3:22
2.	"Play That Summer" (instrumental)				3:22
Total length:					6:44

Luv Us X Linda X Exciting, released on August 1, 2020
No.	Title	Lyrics	Music	Artist	Length
1.	"Luv Us" (두리쥬와; featuring S.B.N)	Kim Hwa-kyung	Park Hyun-woo	U-Duragon	3:40
2.	"Linda" (featuring Yoon Mi-rae)	Linda G; Code Kunst; Yoon Mi-rae	Code Kunst; Park Jong-kwon; Devita; Yoon Mi-rae	Linda G	4:32
3.	"Exciting" (신난다; featuring Mamamoo)	B. Ryong; Lee Hyun-seung; Cosmic Sound (RBW); Cosmic Girl; Moonbyul	Lee Hyun-seung; B. Ryong; Cosmic Sound; Cosmic Girl; TM	B. Ryong	3:32
4.	"Beach Again" (acoustic version)	Linda G	Lee Sang-soon	Lee Sang-soon	4:23
5.	"Luv Us" (instrumental)				3:40
6.	"Linda" (instrumental)				4:32
7.	"Exciting" (instrumental)				3:32
8.	"Beach Again" (instrumental)				4:23
Total length:					6:44

"Don't Touch Me", released on October 10, 2020
No.	Title	Lyrics	Music	Artist	Length
1.	"Don't Touch Me"	Black Eyed Pilseung; Jeon Goon; Eun Bi; Illson; John John; Jaero	Black Eyed Pilseung; Jeon Goon	Refund Sisters	3:44
Total length:					3:44

=== MSG Wannabe ===
These songs were released through the MSG Wannabe segment.

MSG Wannabe Top 8 Performance Songs, released on May 22, 2021
No.	Title	Lyrics	Music	Artist	Length
1.	"Journey to Atlantis" (상상더하기)	Jang Yeon-jung; Enne	Musoh; Galax	MSG Wannabe Top 8	4:01
2.	"Resignation" (체념)	Lee Young-hyun	Lee Young-hyun	JSDK	5:03
3.	"If" (만약에)	Song Jae-won	Kim Joon-bum; Lee Chang-hee	M.O.M	4:46
Total length:					13:50

MSG Wannabe 1st Album, released on June 26, 2021
No.	Title	Lyrics	Music	Artist	Length
1.	"Foolish Love" (바라만 본다)	Kang Eun-kyung; Kim Do-hoon (RBW)	Park Geun-tae; Kim Do-hoon; Kang Ji-won	M.O.M	3:32
2.	"Only You" (나를 아는 사람)	Youngjun	Naul	JSDK	4:52
3.	"Foolish Love" (instrumental)				3:32
4.	"Only You" (instrumental)				4:52
Total length:					16:48

"I Love You", released on July 10, 2021
No.	Title	Lyrics	Music	Artist	Length
1.	"I Love You" (난 너를 사랑해)	Roco; Berry	Roco; Berry	MSG Wannabe	4:11
2.	"I Love You" (instrumental)				4:11
Total length:					8:22

=== Hangout with Yoo+ (Acorn Festival) ===
This song was released through the Hangout with Yoo+ (Acorn Festival) segment.

"Still I Love You", released on December 18, 2021
No.	Title	Lyrics	Music	Artist	Length
1.	"Still I Love You"	Black Eyed Pilseung; Jeon Goon; Haha	Black Eyed Pilseung; Jeon Goon	Toyote	3:25
2.	"Still I Love You" (instrumental)				3:25
Total length:					6:50

=== WSG Wannabe ===
These songs were released through the WSG Wannabe segment.

WSG Wannabe Group Competition, released on May 28, 2022
No.	Title	Lyrics	Music	Artist	Length
1.	"You and I"	Teddy	Teddy	Daecheongbong (Note: Consists of Lee Bo-ram, Sole, Uhm Ji-yoon and Jung Ji-so)	3:53
2.	"Happy Me" (행복한 나를)	Yoo Yoo-jin	Park Geun-tae	Shinseonbong (Note: Consists of Navi, Soyeon (Laboum) and eliminated contestant Chae Jung-an)	4:38
3.	"Love's Greeting" (사랑의 인사)	Lee Ji-eun; Hwang Sung-jin	Lee Sang-ho; Kim Do-hoon	Birobong (Note: Consists of Park Jin-joo, Jo Hyun-ah and eliminated contestants Rihey and Mijoo)	4:30
4.	"Break Away"	Park Kyung-jin	Lee Hyun-jung	Halmibong (Note: Consists of Yoon Eun-hye, Kota, Kwon Jin-ah and Hynn)	4:21
Total length:					17:22

WSG Wannabe 12, released on June 4, 2022
No.	Title	Lyrics	Music	Artist	Length
1.	"Wonderful Love" (어마어마해)	Duble Sidekick; Tenzo & Tasco; Long Candy	Tenzo & Tasco; Long Candy; The Cannels	WSG Wannabe	4:04
Total length:					4:04

WSG Wannabe 1st Album, released on July 9, 2022
No.	Title	Lyrics	Music	Artist	Length
1.	"At That Moment" (그때 그 순간 그대로 (그그그))	Kim Do-hoon (RBW); Seo Yong-bae (RBW)	Kim Do-hoon; Seo Yong-bae	Gaya-G	3:43
2.	"I Missed You" (보고싶었어)	Jo Young-soo; Han Gil	Jo Young-soo; Han Gil	Sa-Fire	3:28
3.	"Clink Clink" (클링 클링)	Kenzie	Kenzie; Phat Fabe; Gabriel Brandes; Karen Poole; Coach & Sendo	Oasiso	3:23
4.	"At That Moment" (instrumental)				3:43
5.	"I Missed You" (instrumental)				3:28
6.	"Clink Clink" (instrumental)				3:23
Total length:					21:08

"When I Close My Eyes", released on August 6, 2022
No.	Title	Lyrics	Music	Artist	Length
1.	"When I Close My Eyes" (눈을 감으면)	Jung Joon-il	Jung Joon-il	WSG Wannabe	4:25
2.	"When I Close My Eyes" (instrumental)				4:25
Total length:					8:50

=== Throwaway/JS Entertainment ===
These songs were released through the JS Entertainment segments.

"Lonely Night", released on March 25, 2023
No.	Title	Lyrics	Music	Artist	Length
1.	"Lonely Night (밤이 무서워요)"	Hwang Hyun (MonoTree)	Hwang Hyun; Yoon Jong-sung; Holy Holy (MonoTree)	JuJu Secret	3:14
2.	"Lonely Night (밤이 무서워요)" (instrumental)				3:14
Total length:					6:28

"Alone", released on November 4, 2023
No.	Title	Lyrics	Music	Artist	Length
1.	"Alone (돌아와줘요)"	Son Go-eun(MonoTree), Chu Dae-gwan (MonoTree)	Chu Dae-gwan (MonoTree); Han Yong-min	JuJu Secret	3:21
2.	"Alone (돌아와줘요)" (instrumental)				3:21
Total length:					6:42

"JS Ent", released on December 2, 2023
No.	Title	Lyrics	Artist	Length
1.	"Say Yes"	Joacim Bo Persson, Johan Carl Axel Alkeñas, Ryan S. Jhun, Sean Michael Alexander, SQVARE, Sunwoojunga	One Top	3:43
2.	"Maybe I'm not in love (잠깐만 TIME)"	Cloud, IO, JUPETER	JuJu Secret	2:54
3.	"Say Yes" (instrumental)			3:43
4.	"Maybe I'm not in love (잠깐만 TIME)" (instrumental)			2:54
Total length:				13:15

== Ratings ==
- Ratings listed below are the individual corner ratings of Hangout with Yoo. (Note: Individual corner ratings do not include commercial time, which regular ratings include.)
- In the ratings below, the highest rating for the show will be in red and the lowest rating for the show will be in blue each year.

=== 2019 ===
List of ratings (episode 1–23)
Hangout with Yoo (episode 1–23) : South Korea viewers per episode (millions)

Episodes	Episode number																						
Episodes	1	2	3	4	5	6	7	8	9	10	11	12	13	14	15	16	17	18	19	20	21	22	23
Episode 1–23	N/A	0.961	N/A	N/A	0.882	N/A	N/A	N/A	1.279	0.936	N/A	1.151	1.084	1.190	N/A	1.424	1.399	1.458	1.399	1.633	1.511	1.929	1.668

Source: Audience measurement performed nationwide by Nielsen Korea.

Ep. #	Original Airdate	AGB Nielsen Ratings Nationwide	
Ep. #	Original Airdate	Part 1	Part 2
Pilot	July 20	4.2%	
1	July 27	4.3%	4.6%
2	August 3	4.0%	4.3%
3	August 10	4.0%	4.1%
4	August 17	3.5%	4.2%
5	August 24	3.7%	4.2%
6	August 31	3.1%	3.6%
7	September 7	4.3%	4.7%
8	September 14	3.3%	3.7%
9	September 21	3.8%	6.6%
10	September 28	3.3%	4.4%
11	October 5	3.0%	4.1%
12	October 12	4.8%	5.6%
13	October 19	4.5%	5.1%
14	October 26	4.7%	5.9%
15	November 2	4.2%	4.9%
16	November 9	5.9%	7.2%
17	November 16	5.8%	6.9%
18	November 23	5.3%	7.8%
19	November 30	5.9%	7.4%
20	December 7	6.9%	8.5%
21	December 14	6.7%	7.6%
22	December 21	8.0%	8.9%
23	December 28	6.2%	9.0%

=== 2020 ===
List of ratings (episode 24–73)
Hangout with Yoo (episode 24–73) : South Korea viewers per episode (millions)

Episodes	Episode number																								
Episodes	1	2	3	4	5	6	7	8	9	10	11	12	13	14	15	16	17	18	19	20	21	22	23	24	25
Episode 24–48	1.858	1.859	2.044	2.174	2.359	2.110	1.695	2.476	1.930	2.297	1.920	1.652	1.984	1.707	1.606	1.716	1.675	1.895	1.837	1.769	2.219	2.071	2.448	2.110	2.062
Episode 49–73	2.072	2.128	2.298	2.132	2.381	2.469	2.142	2.695	3.271	2.968	2.767	2.654	2.879	2.598	2.700	2.791	3.066	2.609	2.611	2.504	2.223	2.400	2.399	2.541	2.521

Source: Audience measurement performed nationwide by Nielsen Korea.

Ep. #	Original Airdate	AGB Nielsen Ratings Nationwide	
Ep. #	Original Airdate	Part 1	Part 2
24	January 4	6.7%	8.6%
25	January 11	7.3%	9.3%
26	January 18	7.1%	9.1%
Special 1	January 25	4.5%	5.4%
Special 2	January 27	3.4%	3.7%
27	February 1	7.3%	10.1%
28	February 8	9.1%	10.9%
29	February 15	8.7%	9.1%
30	February 22	5.5%	7.7%
31	February 29	6.7%	10.8%
32	March 7	7.0%	8.0%
33	March 14	6.6%	9.7%
34	March 21	6.6%	7.4%
35	March 28	5.6%	7.3%
36	April 4	5.2%	8.5%
37	April 11	4.2%	7.1%
38	April 18	5.5%	6.9%
39	April 25	5.6%	7.1%
40	May 2	6.0%	8.3%
41	May 9	6.0%	8.2%
42	May 16	5.9%	8.5%
43	May 23	5.0%	7.6%
44	May 30	7.4%	9.3%
45	June 6	6.7%	9.6%
46	June 13	8.0%	10.4%
47	June 20	7.0%	9.7%
48	June 27	7.0%	9.4%
49	July 4	7.1%	8.9%
50	July 11	6.7%	8.6%
51	July 18	7.3%	9.0%
52	July 25	6.9%	8.4%
53	August 1	8.3%	10.1%
54	August 8	9.2%	10.4%
55	August 15	7.1%	9.3%
56	August 22	8.2%	11.0%
57	August 29	10.2%	13.3%
58	September 5	9.9%	12.3%
59	September 12	8.7%	11.1%
60	September 19	8.9%	11.5%
61	September 26	9.7%	12.2%
62	October 3	8.8%	11.4%
63	October 10	8.9%	11.2%
64	October 17	10.1%	11.6%
65	October 24	9.4%	12.7%
66	October 31	9.4%	11.5%
67	November 7	8.8%	11.9%
68	November 14	9.4%	11.2%
69	November 21	8.2%	10.6%
70	November 28	7.9%	10.1%
71	December 5	7.9%	10.2%
72	December 12	8.0%	10.9%
73	December 26	8.7%	10.8%

=== 2021 ===
List of ratings (episode 74–119)
Hangout with Yoo (episode 74–119) : South Korea viewers per episode (millions)

Episodes	Episode number																						
Episodes	1	2	3	4	5	6	7	8	9	10	11	12	13	14	15	16	17	18	19	20	21	22	23
Episode 74–96	2.276	2.901	2.670	2.570	2.426	2.090	2.317	2.122	1.613	1.942	1.740	1.732	2.145	1.913	2.532	2.317	2.352	2.217	2.787	2.207	2.243	2.208	1.871
Episode 97–119	1.962	1.905	2.086	1.946	2.031	2.226	1.926	1.518	1.662	1.498	1.548	1.563	1.544	1.518	1.662	1.498	1.548	1.563	1.420	1.521	1.740	1.377	1.787

Source: Audience measurement performed nationwide by Nielsen Korea.

Ep. #	Original Airdate	AGB Nielsen Ratings Nationwide	
Ep. #	Original Airdate	Part 1	Part 2
74	January 2	7.9%	8.9%
75	January 9	8.9%	12.7%
76	January 16	8.5%	11.8%
77	January 23	7.9%	11.6%
78	January 30	8.3%	10.1%
79	February 6	7.6%	9.0%
80	February 13	9.0%	9.6%
81	February 20	7.3%	8.8%
82	February 27	5.8%	6.9%
83	March 6	6.7%	8.7%
84	March 13	6.8%	8.4%
85	March 20	6.8%	7.6%
86	March 27	7.3%	9.7%
87	April 10	5.6%	8.1%
88	April 17	7.7%	10.8%
89	April 24	6.5%	10.0%
90	May 1	7.1%	9.8%
91	May 8	7.4%	10.0%
92	May 15	9.8%	11.5%
93	May 22	8.1%	10.0%
94	May 29	8.2%	10.5%
95	June 5	7.2%	9.1%
96	June 12	7.5%	8.6%
97	June 19	6.5%	8.4%
98	June 26	6.4%	8.1%
99	July 3	8.8%	
100	July 10	8.2%	
101	July 17	8.9%	
102	August 21	9.1%	
103	August 28	8.2%	
104	September 4	8.8%	
105	September 11	9.1%	
106	September 18	8.4%	
107	September 25	7.1%	
108	October 2	7.2%	
109	October 9	6.6%	
110	October 16	6.5%	
111	October 23	7.3%	
112	October 30	6.3%	
113	November 6	7.0%	
114	November 13	7.0%	
115	November 20	6.0%	
116	November 27	6.7%	
117	December 4	7.1%	
118	December 11	6.0%	
119	December 18	8.0%	

=== 2022 ===
List of ratings (episode 120–166)
Hangout with Yoo (episode 120–166) : South Korea viewers per episode (millions)

Episodes	Episode number															
Episodes	1	2	3	4	5	6	7	8	9	10	11	12	13	14	15	16
120–135	1.421	1.765	1.752	1.440	1.674	1.704	1.819	1.703	1.702	1.425	1.575	1.354	1.289	1.325	1.456	1.303
136–151	1.411	1.398	1.509	1.461	1.416	1.335	1.116	1.214	1.264	1.170	1.271	1.359	1.261	1.298	1.092	0.896
152–166	0.948	1.163	1.143	0.972	0.930	1.337	1.040	1.132	1.331	1.055	1.099	1.077	1.400	1.169	1.485	–

Source: Audience measurement performed nationwide by Nielsen Korea.

Average TV viewership ratings
Ep.	Original broadcast date	Average audience share	
Ep.	Original broadcast date	Nielsen Korea	
Ep.	Original broadcast date	Nationwide	Seoul
120	January 1	6.4% (11th)	6.8% (8th)
121	January 8	7.7% (8th)	8.2% (4th)
122	January 15	7.1% (9th)	7.2% (8th)
123	January 22	6.5% (10th)	6.9% (8th)
124	January 29	7.8% (5th)	8.0% (2nd)
125	February 19	7.9% (5th)	8.7% (3rd)
126	February 26	8.2% (4th)	8.9% (4th)
127	March 5	7.5% (5th)	8.1% (4th)
128	March 12	7.3% (7th)	7.6% (5th)
129	March 19	6.2% (12th)	6.6% (8th)
130	March 26	7.3% (8th)	8.2% (3rd)
131	April 2	6.8% (5th)	7.1% (4th)
132	April 9	6.0% (10th)	6.1% (7th)
133	April 16	6.4% (7th)	7.0% (4th)}
134	April 23	6.7% (6th)	7.1% (6th)
135	April 30	6.5% (6th)	7.1% (5th)
136	May 7	6.3% (4th)	6.8% (4th)
137	May 14	6.6% (5th)	6.6% (5th)
138	May 21	6.7% (5th)	7.1% (4th)
139	May 28	7.0% (4th)	7.2% (3rd)
140	June 4	6.9% (3rd)	7.8% (2nd)
141	June 11	6.3% (4th)	6.6% (4th)
142	June 18	5.5% (10th)	5.9% (6th)
143	June 25	6.1% (8th)	6.4% (4th)
144	July 2	6.3% (5th)	6.8% (3rd)
145	July 9	5.6% (9th)	6.0% (6th)
146	July 16	5.8% (6th)	6.2% (4th)
147	July 23	5.9% (8th)	6.5% (6th)
148	July 30	5.4% (8th)	5.9% (6th)
149	August 6	5.5% (10th)	6.0% (5th)
150	September 3	5.2% (12th)	5.6% (6th)
151	September 10	4.2% (8th)	4.5% (6th)
152	September 17	4.8% (14th)	5.1% (8th)
153	September 24	5.6% (8th)	5.8% (6th)
154	October 1	5.7% (5th)	6.1% (5th)
155	October 8	4.9% (12th)	4.9% (8th)
156	October 15	4.3% (16th)	4.5% (10th)
157	October 22	5.7% (5th)	5.9% (4th)
158	October 29	4.8% (10th)	5.1% (7th)
159	November 12 (Note: The broadcast on November 5th will be canceled in tribute to the aftermath of the Seoul Halloween crowd crush.)	5.0% (10th)	4.9% (11th)
160	November 19	6.8% (3rd)	7.6% (3rd)
161	November 26	5.0% (9th)	5.1% (8th)
162	December 3	5.2% (11th)	5.8% (10th)
163	December 10	4.7% (12th)	5.0% (8th)
164	December 17	6.1% (6th)	6.6% (2nd)
165	December 24	5.6% (9th)	6.3% (5th)
166	December 31	6.8% (3rd)	7.3% (3rd)

=== 2023 ===
List of ratings (episode 167–214)
Hangout with Yoo (episode 167–214) : South Korea viewers per episode (thousands)

Episodes	Episode number															
Episodes	1	2	3	4	5	6	7	8	9	10	11	12	13	14	15	16
167–182	1317	1331	1060	1403	1163	1214	1133	925	976	942	880	968	1003	939	1029	1029
183–198	965	967	850	753	869	636	869	724	862	736	970	845	810	681	847	831
199–214	800	755	907	794	1048	895	874	809	1021	909	957	810	855	1115	TBD	1096

Source: Audience measurement performed nationwide by Nielsen Korea.

Average TV viewership ratings
Ep.	Original broadcast date	Average audience share	
Ep.	Original broadcast date	Nielsen Korea	
Ep.	Original broadcast date	Nationwide	Seoul
167	January 7	6.2% (5th)	6.9% (4th)
168	January 14	6.5% (5th)	7.5% (3rd)
169	January 21	4.9% (9th)	4.9% (9th)
170	January 28	6.4% (5th)	6.5% (4th)
171	February 4	5.1% (8th)	5.6% (4th)
172	February 11	5.7% (7th)	6.2% (4th)
173	February 18	5.0% (11th)	5.9% (4th)
174	February 25	4.0% (17th)	4.5% (12th)
175	March 4	4.4% (9th)	4.7% (7th)
176	March 11	4.2% (12th)	4.6% (7th)
177	March 18	4.2% (16th)	4.8% (8th)
178	March 25	4.4% (13th)	4.9% (8th)
179	April 1	4.7% (9th)	5.0% (6th)
180	April 8	4.3% (11th)	4.8% (7th)
181	April 15	4.8% (6th)	5.7% (5th)
182	April 22	4.6% (11th)	5.0% (7th)
183	April 29	4.4% (8th)	4.8% (5th)
184	May 6	4.1% (15th)	4.5% (8th)
185	May 13	4.1% (9th)	4.4% (6th)
186	May 20	3.1% (19th)	3.4% (12th)
187	May 27	4.1% (11th)	4.4% (8th)
188	June 3	3.0% (19th)	2.9% (14th)
189	June 10	4.3% (9th)	4.8% (6th)
190	July 1	3.2% (18th)	3.6% (11th)
191	July 8	3.8% (15th)	4.1% (11th)
192	July 15	3.5% (-)	3.9% (18th)
193	July 22	4.2% (13th)	4.6% (7th)
194	July 29	3.6% (15th)	3.9% (10th)
195	August 5	3.9% (14th)	3.9% (9th)
196	August 12	2.9% (-)	-
197	August 19	4.0% (12th)	4.4% (7th)
198	August 26	3.6% (16th)	3.9% (10th)
199	September 2	3.4% (16th)	3.5% (15th)
200	September 9	3.5% (17th)	3.8% (8th)
201	September 16	4.0% (15th)	4.4% (7th)
202	September 23	3.9% (13th)	4.7% (5th)
203	October 14	4.8% (10th)	5.3% (6th)
204	October 21	4.0% (11th)	4.4% (9th)
205	October 28	4.1% (13th)	4.5% (7th)
206	November 4	3.7% (18th)	3.7% (15th)
207	November 11	4.3% (14th)	4.9% (7th)
208	November 18	4.3% (13th)	4.9% (5th)
209	November 25	4.0% (15th)	4.3% (11th)
210	December 2	3.9% (15th)	4.2% (13th)
211	December 9	4.2% (13th)	4.6% (7th)
212	December 16	5.5% (8th)	6.1% (5th)
213	December 23	3.9%	4.2%
214	December 30	4.9% (13th)	5.4% (8th)

=== 2024 ===
List of ratings (episode 215–261)
Hangout with Yoo (episode 215–present) : South Korea viewers per episode (thousands)

Episodes	Episode number											
Episodes	1	2	3	4	5	6	7	8	9	10	11	12
215–226	940	1249	1048	823	898	886	965	850	1007	840	963	727
227–238	755	709	717	817	875	551	848	641	735	729	785	707
239–250	873	839	934	685	816	1068	680	686	749	777	922	673
251–261	705	923	858	932	925	839	862	893	962	939	989	–

Source: Audience measurement performed nationwide by Nielsen Korea.

Average TV viewership ratings
Ep.	Original broadcast date	Average audience share	
Ep.	Original broadcast date	Nielsen Korea	
Ep.	Original broadcast date	Nationwide	Seoul
215	January 6	4.4% (12th)	4.4% (11th)
216	January 13	5.8% (5th)	6.6% (4th)
217	January 20	4.6% (11th)	4.5% (12th)
218	January 27	3.9% (18th)	4.3% (13th)
219	February 3	4.0% (17th)	4.1% (14th)
220	February 10	4.2% (9th)	4.3% (8th)
221	February 17	4.5% (15th)	5.1% (8th)
222	February 24	4.0 (14th)	3.9 (14th)
223	March 2	4.8% (9th)	5.2% (7th)
224	March 9	3.8% (15th)	3.9% (10th)
225	March 16	4.8% (7th)	5.5% (5th)
226	March 23	3.2% (18th)	3.5% (16th)
227	March 30	3.5% (14th)	3.9% (8th)
228	April 6	3.6% (14th)	4.0 (6th)
229	April 13	3.5% (15th)	3.6% (9th)
230	April 20	3.8% (13th)	3.9% (10th)
231	April 27	4.4% (5th)	4.9% (4th)
232	May 4	2.9% (18th)	3.0% (17th)
233	May 11	4.2% (11th)	5.1% (5th)
234	May 18	3.3% (16th)	3.7% (11th)
235	May 25	3.3% (18th)	3.8% (10th)
236	June 1	3.8% (14th)	3.7% (10th)
237	June 8	4.2% (12th)	4.5% (8th)
238	June 15	3.6% (16th)	4.3% (8th)
239	June 22	4.1% (16th)	4.5% (10th)
240	June 29	3.7% (15th)	4.1% (9th)
241	July 6	4.4% (8th)	5.2% (5th)
242	July 13	2.9% (20th)	3.0% (17th)
243	July 20	4.0% (14th)	4.6% (8th)
244	August 17	4.8% (8th)	5.4% (4th)
245	August 24	2.9%	3.4% (19th)
246	August 31	3.0%	3.2% (17th)
247	September 7	3.6% (16th)	4.2% (10th)
248	September 14	4.3% (13th)	4.6% (8th)
249	September 21	4.6% (15th)	4.5% (13th)
250	September 28	3.4% (17th)	3.7% (11th)
251	October 5	3.3%	3.3% (19th)
252	October 12	4.1% (12th)	4.5% (7th)
253	October 19	3.9% (15th)	4.2% (11th)
254	October 26	4.5% (11th)	4.7% (8th)
255	November 2	4.7% (9th)	4.7% (7th)
256	November 9	3.7% (16th)	3.8% (11th)
257	November 16	3.9% (10th)	4.1% (7th)
258	November 23	4.0% (14th)	4.2% (10th)
259	November 30	4.6% (11th)	5.1% (6th)
260	December 21	4.3% (11th)	4.3% (8th)
261	December 28	5.0% (8th)	5.4% (4th)

=== 2025 ===
List of ratings (episode 262–310)
Hangout with Yoo (episode 263–310 + 1 Special Episode) : South Korea viewers per episode (thousands)

Episodes	Episode number																
Episodes	1	2	3	4	5	6	7	8	9	10	11	12	13	14	15	16	17
SP–278	899	1005	1153	752	1181	1255	1155	1088	964	927	851	817	787	948	972	815	599
278–295	725	912	588	784	638	740	776	911	649	607	791	1021	900	925	1092	1263	1263
295–310	1037	1156	1041	1131	1237	1457	1075	1016	889	836	766	819	801	647	846	–	

Source: Audience measurement performed nationwide by Nielsen Korea.

Average TV viewership ratings
Ep.	Original broadcast date	Average audience share	
Ep.	Original broadcast date	Nielsen Korea	
Ep.	Original broadcast date	Nationwide	Seoul
SP	January 4	4.2% (14th)	4.5% (9th)
262	January 11	4.3% (10th)	4.4% (11th)
263	January 18	5.4% (10th)	4.5% (13th)
264	January 25	3.4% (18th)	3.3% (20th)
265	February 1	5.5% (9th)	6.1% (6th)
266	February 8	5.8% (10th)	6.5% (5th)
267	February 15	5.5% (9th)	6.1% (5th)
268	February 22	4.8% (11th)	4.6% (9th)
269	March 1	4.4% (14th)	4.4% (10th)
270	March 8	4.5% (11th)	4.4% (10th)
271	March 15	4.1% (13th)	4.1% (11th)
272	March 22	3.8% (12th)	4.0% (10th)
273	March 29	3.9% (14th)	3.7% (12th)
274	April 5	4.2% (12th)	4.3% (9th)
275	April 12	4.4% (10th)	4.7% (7th)
276	April 19	3.9% (10th)	4.2% (8th)
277	April 26	3.0% (15th)	3.0% (12th)
278	May 3	3.6% (13th)	3.9% (8th)
279	May 10	4.3% (8th)	4.8% (7th)
280	May 17	2.9% (16th)	3.1% (15th)
281	May 24	3.7% (12th)	3.8% (8th)
282	May 31	3.2% (15th)	3.2% (13th)
283	June 7	3.7% (8th)	4.1% (7th)
284	June 14	3.6% (13th)	4.1% (7th)
285	June 21	4.2% (12th)	4.2% (6th)
286	June 28	3.1% (17th)	3.3% (12th)
287	July 5	3.0% (18th)	3.5% (12th)
288	July 12	3.8% (14th)	4.5% (6th)
289	July 19	4.5% (10th)	5.0% (7th)
290	July 26	4.0% (12th)	4.2% (7th)
291	August 2	4.6% (7th)	5.4% (5th)
292	August 9	5.1% (6th)	5.6% (5th)
293	August 16	5.2% (6th)	5.9% (4th)
294	August 23	6.0% (4th)	6.3% (4th)
295	August 30	5.1% (6th)	5.5% (5th)
296	September 6	5.8% 5th)	6.7% (4th)
297	September 13	5.1% (5th)	5.7% (4th)
298	September 20	5.4% (4th)	5.9% (4th)
299	September 27	6.3% (3rd)	6.5% (3rd)
300	October 4	6.6% (2th)	7.3% (2th)
301	October 11	5.3% (5th)	5.5% (5th)
302	October 18	4.8% (7th)	5.1% (4th)
303	October 25	4.7% (7th)	4.8% (4th)
304	November 8	4.3% (8th)	4.4% (4th)
305	November 22	4.0% (10th)	4.3% (7th)
306	November 29	3.5% (15th)	3.5% (9th)
307	Disember 6	3.9% (14th)	4.2% (8th)
308	Disember 13	3.7% (15th)	3.8% (16th)
309	Disember 20	3.0% (-)	3.1% (17th)
310	Disember 27	3.8% (11th)	3.7% (9th)

=== 2026 ===
List of ratings (episode 311–present)
Hangout with Yoo (episode 311-present) : South Korea viewers per episode (thousands)

Episodes	Episode number									
Episodes	1	2	3	4	5	6	7	8	9	10
311-320	1047	966	1015	1138	916	951	1017	978	1184	1033
321-330	1007	809	939	879	845	955	941	702	926	558
331–340	751	844	812	805	784	982	958	851	885	914
341–350	1071	TBD	TBD	TBD	TBD	–				

Source: Audience measurement performed nationwide by Nielsen Korea.

Average TV viewership ratings
Ep.	Original broadcast date	Average audience share	
Ep.	Original broadcast date	Nielsen Korea	
Ep.	Original broadcast date	Nationwide	Seoul
311	January 3	4.9% (10th)	5.6% (5th)
312	January 10	4.6% (10th)	4.6% (7th)
313	January 17	4.4% (12th)	4.7% (7th)
314	January 24	5.4% (5th)	5.7% (4th)
315	January 31	4.2% (13th)	4.5% (6th)
316	February 7	4.1% (12th)	4.4% (7th)
317	February 14	4.7% (9th)	5.2% (6th)
318	February 21	4.4% (9th)	4.6% (6th)
319	February 28	4.9% (8th)	5.2% (5th)
320	March 14	4.8% (9th)	4.9% (6th)
321	March 21	4.8% (7th)	4.8% (6th)
322	March 28	3.5% (15th)	3.4% (12th)
323	April 4	4.3% (10th)	4.3% (8th)
324	April 11	3.9% (13th)	4.2% (10th)
325	April 18	3.8% (13th)	4.0% (8th)
326	April 25	4.5% (7th)	4.2% (7th)
327	May 2	4.2% (10th)	4.8% (6th)
328	May 9	3.4% (17th)	3.2% (15th)
329	May 16	4.3% (8th)	4.3% (7th)
330	May 23	2.7% (19th)	3.0% (14th)
331	May 30	3.6% (17th)	3.9% (9th)
332	June 6	3.8% (12th)	3.8% (11th)
333	June 13	3.6% (15th)	3.6% (7th)
334	June 20	3.6% (12th)	3.8% (8th)
335	June 27	3.7% (14th)	4.0% (8th)
336	July 4	4.2% (9th)	4.0% (8th)
337	July 11	4.6% (8th)	4.5% (7th)
338	July 18	3.6% (15th)	3.6% (13th)
339	July 25	3.9% (11th)	3.9% (9th)
340	August 1	4.2% (7th)	4.1% (6th)
341	August 8	4.7% (8th)	4.7% (7th)
342	August 15	% (th)	% (th)
		% (th)	% (th)
		% (th)	% (th)

== Awards and nominations ==
Name of the award ceremony, year presented, category, nominee of the awar d, and the result of the nomination
Award ceremony	Year	Category	Nominee	Result	Ref.
Baeksang Arts Awards	2020	Best Variety Performer – Male	Yoo Jae-suk	Won	
Baeksang Arts Awards	2020	Best Entertainment Program	Hangout with Yoo	Nominated	
Baeksang Arts Awards	2021	Grand Prize (Daesang) for TV	Yoo Jae-suk	Won	
Baeksang Arts Awards	2021	Best Variety Performer – Male	Yoo Jae-suk	Nominated	
Baeksang Arts Awards	2021	Best Entertainment Program	Hangout with Yoo	Won	
Baeksang Arts Awards	2022	Best Variety Performer – Female	Lee Mi-joo	Nominated	
Baeksang Arts Awards	2024	Grand Prize (Daesang) for TV	Yoo Jae-suk	Nominated	
Baeksang Arts Awards	2024	Best Variety Performer – Male	Yoo Jae-suk	Nominated	
Baeksang Arts Awards	2025	Best Variety Performer – Male	Yoo Jae-suk	Nominated	
Brand of the Year Awards	2020	Weekend Variety Show	Hangout with Yoo	Won	
Brand of the Year Awards	2021	Weekend Variety Show	Hangout with Yoo	Won	
Brand of the Year Awards	2022	Weekend Variety Show	Hangout with Yoo	Won	
Korea Broadcasting Awards	2020	Producer Award	Kim Tae-ho	Won	
Korea Broadcasting Awards	2021	Best Variety Show	Hangout with Yoo	Won	
Korea Broadcasting Awards	2021	Best Male Variety Star	Yoo Jae-suk	Won	
Korea Broadcasting Awards	2021	Writer Award	Choi Hye-jung	Won	
Korean PD Awards	2020	Best Variety Show	Hangout with Yoo	Won	
Korean PD Awards	2021	TV Presenter	Yoo Jae-suk	Won	
Korean PD Awards	2022	Best Comedian	Shin Bong-sun	Won	
Consumer Day KCA Culture & Entertainment Awards	2023	Viewer's Choice Variety Star of the Year	Yoo Jae-suk; Haha	Won	
Consumer Day KCA Culture & Entertainment Awards	2023	Viewer's Choice Popular Star	Joo Woo-jae	Won	
Korea Advertisers Associate (KAA Awards)	2025	Program of the Year	Hangout with Yoo	Won	
FUNdex Awards	2025	Best Player of Steady TV Show	Yoo Jae-suk	Won	
MBC Entertainment Awards	2019	Program of the Year	Hangout with Yoo	Nominated	
MBC Entertainment Awards	2019	Top Excellence Award in Music/Talk Category (Male)	You Hee-yeol	Nominated	
MBC Entertainment Awards	2019	Top Excellence Award in Music/Talk Category (Male)	Lee Juck	Nominated	
MBC Entertainment Awards	2019	Excellence Award in Music/Talk Category (Male)	Jo Se-ho	Won	
MBC Entertainment Awards	2019	Rookie Award (Male)	Yoo San-seul	Won	
MBC Entertainment Awards	2019	Best Couple Award	Park Hyun-woo and Jeong Kyung-chun	Nominated	
MBC Entertainment Awards	2019	Special Award in Music/Talk	Park Hyun-woo, Jeong Kyung-chun and Lee Geon-woo	Won	
MBC Entertainment Awards	2020	Grand Prize (Daesang)	Yoo Jae-suk	Won	
MBC Entertainment Awards	2020	Program of the Year	Hangout with Yoo	Won	
MBC Entertainment Awards	2020	Top Excellence Award in Music/Talk Category (Female)	Lee Hyo-ri	Won	
MBC Entertainment Awards	2020	Excellence Award in Music/Talk Category (Female)	Uhm Jung-hwa and Jessi	Won	
MBC Entertainment Awards	2020	Excellence Award in Music/Talk Category (Male)	Kim Jong-min	Won	
MBC Entertainment Awards	2020	Best Couple Award	Yoo Jae-suk and Lee Hyo-ri	Won	
MBC Entertainment Awards	2020	Best Couple Award	Kim Jong-min and Jung Jae-hyung	Nominated	
MBC Entertainment Awards	2020	Best Couple Award	Rain and Lee Hyo-ri	Nominated	
MBC Entertainment Awards	2020	Scriptwriter of the Year	Choi Hye-jung	Won	
MBC Entertainment Awards	2021	Grand Prize (Daesang)	Yoo Jae-suk	Won	
MBC Entertainment Awards	2021	Entertainer of the Year Award	Yoo Jae-suk	Won	
MBC Entertainment Awards	2021	Program of the Year	Hangout with Yoo	Won	
MBC Entertainment Awards	2021	Top Excellence Award in Variety Category – Female	Shin Bong-sun	Won	
MBC Entertainment Awards	2021	Rookie Award	Mijoo	Won	
MBC Entertainment Awards	2021	Rookie Award	Parc Jae-jung	Won	
MBC Entertainment Awards	2021	Popularity Award	Kim Jong-min	Won	
MBC Entertainment Awards	2021	Best Teamwork Award	MSG Wannabe (Note: M.O.M (Jee Seok-jin, KCM, Wonstein, Parc Jae-jung) and JSDK (Kim Jung-min, Simon Dominic, Lee Dong-hwi, Lee Sang-yi))	Won	
MBC Entertainment Awards	2021	Best Character Award	Jeong Jun-ha	Won	
MBC Entertainment Awards	2021	Best Character Award	Haha	Won	
MBC Entertainment Awards	2021	Best Couple Award	Yoo Jae-suk, Mijoo, and Haha	Won	
MBC Entertainment Awards	2022	Entertainer of the Year Award	Yoo Jae-suk	Won	
MBC Entertainment Awards	2022	Excellence Award - Music/Talk	Lee Mi-joo	Won	
MBC Entertainment Awards	2022	Popularity Award	Lee Yi-kyung	Won	
MBC Entertainment Awards	2022	Rookie Award	Park Jin-joo	Won	
MBC Entertainment Awards	2022	Special Award	WSG Wannabe Gaya-G (Lee Bo-ram, Soyeon (Laboum), Hynn, and Jung Ji-so)	Won	
MBC Entertainment Awards	2022	Best Couple Award	Lee Yi-kyung and Mijoo	Nominated	
MBC Entertainment Awards	2023	Best Couple Award	Mijoo and Joo Woo-jae	Nominated	
MBC Entertainment Awards	2023	Popularity Award	One Top (JS, Haha, Kim Jong-min, Woojae, Yikyung, Young K (Day6))	Won	
MBC Entertainment Awards	2023	Excellence Award (Female)	Park Jin-joo	Nominated	
MBC Entertainment Awards	2023	Excellence Award (Female)	Mijoo	Nominated	
MBC Entertainment Awards	2023	Excellence Award (Male)	Joo Woo-jae	Won	
MBC Entertainment Awards	2023	Excellence Award (Male)	Lee Yi-kyung	Nominated	
MBC Entertainment Awards	2023	Top Excellence Award (Male)	Haha	Won	
MBC Entertainment Awards	2023	Entertainer of the Year	Yoo Jae-suk	Won	
MBC Entertainment Awards	2024	Best Entertainer Award	Joo Woo-jae	Won	
MBC Entertainment Awards	2024	Hot Issue Award	Kim Suk-hoon	Won	
MBC Entertainment Awards	2024	Best Couple Award	Yoo Jae-suk, Haha	Won	
MBC Entertainment Awards	2024	Excellence Award	Park Jin-joo	Nominated	
MBC Entertainment Awards	2024	Excellence Award	Lee Mi-joo	Nominated	
MBC Entertainment Awards	2024	Excellence Award	Joo Woo-jae	Nominated	
MBC Entertainment Awards	2024	Excellence Award	Lee Yi-kyung	Won	
MBC Entertainment Awards	2024	Top Excellence Award (Male)	Haha	Nominated	
MBC Entertainment Awards	2024	Program of the Year	Hangout with Yoo	Nominated	
MBC Entertainment Awards	2024	Entertainer of the Year	Yoo Jae-suk	Won	
MBC Entertainment Awards	2024	Grand Prize (Daesang)	Yoo Jae-suk	Nominated	
MBC Entertainment Awards	2025	Rookie Award	Liz	Nominated	
MBC Entertainment Awards	2025	Rookie Award	Lee Jun-young	Nominated	
MBC Entertainment Awards	2025	Rookie Award	Choi Hong-man	Won	
MBC Entertainment Awards	2025	Current Affairs and Culture:Scriptwriter of the Year	Noh Min-sun	Won	
MBC Entertainment Awards	2025	Best Couple Award	Joo Woo-jae, Haha	Nominated	
MBC Entertainment Awards	2025	Excellence Award	Joo Woo-jae	Nominated	
MBC Entertainment Awards	2025	Excellence Award	RalRal	Nominated	
MBC Entertainment Awards	2025	Top Excellence Award	Haha	Nominated	
MBC Entertainment Awards	2025	Program of the Year	Hangout with Yoo	Nominated	
MBC Entertainment Awards	2025	Entertainer of the Year	Yoo Jae-suk	Won	
MBC Entertainment Awards	2025	Grand Prize (Daesang)	Yoo Jae-suk	Won	
