= No Gain No Love =

2024 South Korean television series

- Promotional poster
- Hangul: 손해 보기 싫어서
- RR: Sonhae bogi sireoseo
- MR: Sonhae pogi sirŏsŏ
- Genre: Romantic comedy
- Developed by: CJ ENM Studios
- Written by: Kim Hye-young
- Directed by: Kim Jeong-sik
- Starring: Shin Min-a; Kim Young-dae; Lee Sang-yi; Han Ji-hyun
- Country of origin: South Korea
- Original language: Korean
- No. of episodes: 12

Production
- Running time: 70 minutes
- Production company: Bon Factory

Original release
- Network: tvN
- Release: August 26 – October 1, 2024

Related
- Spice Up Our Love (2024)

No Gain No Love (Korean: 손해 보기 싫어서) is a 2024 South Korean television series starring Shin Min-a, Kim Young-dae, Lee Sang-yi, and Han Ji-hyun. It aired on tvN from August 26, to October 1, 2024, every Monday and Tuesday at 20:50 (KST). It is also available for streaming on TVING in South Korea, and on Amazon Prime Video in selected regions.

== Cast ==
=== Main ===
- Shin Min-a as Son Hae-yeong
  - Oh Ye-ju as young Son Hae-yeong
- Kim Young-dae as Kim Ji-wook
- Lee Sang-yi as Bok Gyu-hyeon
- Han Ji-hyun as Nam Ja-yeon / Yeon Bo-ra

=== Supporting ===
- Jeon Hye-won as Kwon Yi-rin
- Lee You-jin as Yeo Ha-jun

Gyu-hyeon's secretary.

- Joo Min-kyung as Cha Hui-seung

Hae-young's friend.

- Go Wook as Ahn Woo-jae

Hae-yeong's ex-boyfriend.

- Yoon Bok-in as Lee Eun-ok

Hae-yeong's mother.

=== Special appearances ===
- Byeon Woo-seok as himself
- Lee Joong-ok as Nam Gil

== Production ==
=== Development ===
The romantic comedy series was written by Kim Hye-young, directed by Kim Jung-sik, planned by CJ ENM Studios and produced by Bon Factory.

=== Casting ===
On August 4, 2023, it was expected that Lee Jong-won would play the role of Kim Ji-wook, as announced by his agency. On September 1, it was reported that Kim Young-dae had been confirmed to be the male lead and Shin Min-a as the female lead.

== Release ==
No Gain No Love was confirmed to premiere on tvN on August 26, 2024, every Monday and Tuesday at 20:50 (KST). It is also available to stream on TVING and Amazon Prime Video.

== Spin-offs ==
A spin-off of the series titled Spice Up Our Love (Korean: 사장님의 식단표) starring Lee Sang-yi and Han Ji-hyun, was released on October 3, 2024.

== Viewership ==
No Gain No Love : South Korea viewers per episode (thousands)

Season	Episode number												Average
Season	1	2	3	4	5	6	7	8	9	10	11	12	Average
1	884	818	774	889	932	1043	749	724	776	885	854	1135	872

Source: Audience measurement performed nationwide by Nielsen Korea.

Average TV viewership ratings
Ep.	Original broadcast date	Average audience share (Nielsen Korea)	
Ep.	Original broadcast date	Nationwide	Seoul
1	August 26, 2024	3.673% (2nd)	4.072% (1st)
2	August 27, 2024	3.801% (2nd)	4.312% (2nd)
3	September 2, 2024	3.757% (1st)	4.547% (1st)
4	September 3, 2024	3.864% (2nd)	4.255% (2nd)
5	September 9, 2024	4.144% (2nd)	4.465% (2nd)
6	September 10, 2024	4.967% (2nd)	5.942% (2nd)
7	September 16, 2024	2.631% (1st)	3.054% (1st)
8	September 17, 2024	2.906% (1st)	2.891% (2nd)
9	September 23, 2024	3.565% (1st)	4.080% (1st)
10	September 24, 2024	3.885% (1st)	4.027% (1st)
11	September 30, 2024	3.897% (1st)	4.300% (1st)
12	October 1, 2024	4.764% (1st)	5.142% (1st)
Average		3.821%	4.257%
In the table above, the blue numbers represent the lowest ratings and the red numbers represent the highest ratings.; This drama aired on a cable channel/pay TV which normally has a relatively smaller audience compared to free-to-air TV/public broadcasters (KBS, SBS, MBC, and EBS).
