= MSG Wannabe =

South Korean R&B group

- Origin: Seoul, South Korea
- Genres: Ballad; R&B
- Years active: 2021
- Labels: MBC
- Members: Byeollu Ji; Kim Jung-min; Kang Chang-mo; Jung Ki-suck; Lee Dong-hwi; Lee Sang-yi; Wonstein; Parc Jae-jung

MSG Wannabe (Korean: MSG워너비) is a seasonal South Korean supergroup formed on the MBC variety show Hangout with Yoo. The group consists of members Byeollu Ji, Kim Jung-min, Kang Chang-mo, Jung Ki-suck, Lee Dong-hwi, Lee Sang-yi, Wonstein, and Parc Jae-jung.

== Members ==
=== JSDK ===
- Kim Jung-min (Kim Jung-su)
- Simon Dominic (Jung Ki-suck)
- Lee Dong-hwi
- Lee Sang-yi

=== M.O.M ===
- Jee Seok-jin (Byeollu Ji)
- KCM (Kang Chang-mo)
- Wonstein
- Parc Jae-jung

== Discography ==
=== Albums ===
| Title | Album details | Peak chart positions |
| Title | Album details | KOR |
|---|---|---|
| MSG Wannabe Special Album | Released: June 26, 2021; Label: MBC, Kakao M; Formats: CD, digital download | — |

=== Singles ===
List of singles, with selected chart positions, showing year released and album name
| Title | Year | Peak chart positions | | | Certifications | Album |
| Title | Year | KOR | KOR Hot | US World | Certifications | Album |
|---|---|---|---|---|---|---|
| "Journey to Atlantis" (상상더하기) (Covered by MSG Wannabe) | 2021 | 7 | — | — | | MSG Wannabe Top 8 Performance Songs |
| "Resignation" (체념) (Covered by JSDK) | 2021 | 16 | — | — | | MSG Wannabe Top 8 Performance Songs |
| "If" (만약에) (Covered by M.O.M) | 2021 | 19 | — | — | | MSG Wannabe Top 8 Performance Songs |
| "Foolish Love" (바라만 본다) (Song by M.O.M) | 2021 | 1 | 1 | 18 | KMCA: Platinum (Note: Certification for streaming) | MSG Wannabe Special Album |
| "Only You" (나를 아는 사람) (Song by JSDK) | 2021 | 2 | 2 | 15 | | MSG Wannabe Special Album |
| "I Love You" (난 너를 사랑해) | 2021 | 25 | — | — | | Non-album singles |
| "Do You Want to Hear" (듣고 싶을까) (Song by M.O.M) | 2022 | 2 | 10 | — | | Non-album singles |
| "Confessing My Love" (지금 고백합니다) (Song by M.O.M) | 2023 | 94 | — | — | | Non-album singles |
"—" denotes song did not chart.

== Videography ==
=== Music videos ===
| Year | Song Title | Ref. |
|---|---|---|
| 2021 | "Only You + Foolish Love" (나를 아는 사람'을 '바라만 본다) | |
| 2022 | "Do You Want To Hear" (듣고 싶을까) | |

== Awards and nominations ==
Name of the award ceremony, year presented, category, nominee of the award, and the result of the nomination
| Award ceremony | Year | Category | Nominee / Work | Result | Ref. |
|---|---|---|---|---|---|
| Melon Music Awards | 2021 | Project Music Award | MSG Wannabe (M.O.M) | Won | |
| MBC Entertainment Awards | 2021 | Best Teamwork | Hangout with Yoo | Won | |
| Seoul Music Awards | 2022 | K-wave Popularity Award | MSG Wannabe | Nominated | |
| Seoul Music Awards | 2022 | Main Award (Bonsang) | MSG Wannabe | Nominated | |
| Seoul Music Awards | 2022 | Popularity Award | MSG Wannabe | Nominated | |

== See also ==
- Hangout with Yoo
- WSG Wannabe
