= WSG Wannabe =

South Korean group

- Origin: Seoul, South Korea
- Genres: K-pop; R&B
- Years active: 2022
- Labels: MBC
- Members: Yoon Eun-hye (Baby Vox); Navi; Lee Bo-ram; Kota (Sunny Hill); Park Jin-joo; Jo Hyun-ah (Urban Zakapa); Sole; Soyeon (Laboum); Eom Ji-yoon; Kwon Jin-ah; Hynn; Jung Ji-so

WSG Wannabe (Korean: WSG워너비) is a seasonal South Korean supergroup formed on the MBC variety show Hangout with Yoo, and was a female counterpart of MSG Wannabe which formed in the previous year. The group, which officially formed on May 26, 2022, consists of twelve members (ranging from actresses to singers to K-pop idols): Yoon Eun-hye (Baby Vox), Navi, Lee Bo-ram, Kota (Sunny Hill), Park Jin-joo, Jo Hyun-ah (Urban Zakapa), Sole, Soyeon (Laboum), Eom Ji-yoon, Kwon Jin-ah, Hynn and Jung Ji-so. The group released their debut album and tracks on July 9, 2022.

== Members ==
=== Gaya-G ===
- Lee Bo-ram
- Soyeon (Laboum)
- Hynn
- Jung Ji-so

=== Sa-Fire ===
- Navi
- Sole
- Eom Ji-yoon
- Kwon Jin-ah

=== Oasiso ===
- Yoon Eun-hye
- Kota (Sunny Hill)
- Park Jin-joo
- Jo Hyun-ah (Urban Zakapa)

== Discography ==
=== Singles ===
List of singles, with selected chart positions, showing year released and album name
Title	Year	Peak chart positions	Certifications	Album
Title	Year	KOR Circle	Certifications	Album
"You and I" (Park Bom cover) (Covered by Daechungbong (Note: Consists of Lee Bo-ram, Sole, Eom Ji-yoon and Jung Ji-so))	2022	87		WSG Wannabe Group Competition
"Happy Me" (행복한 나를) (Eco cover) (Covered by Shinsunbong (Note: Consists of Navi, Soyeon (Laboum) and eliminated contestant Chae Jung-an))	2022	156		WSG Wannabe Group Competition
"Love's Greeting" (사랑의 인사) (SeeYa cover) (Covered by Birobong (Note: Consists of Park Jin-joo, Jo Hyun-ah (Urban Zakapa) and eliminated contestants Rihey and Mijoo))	2022	125		WSG Wannabe Group Competition
"Break Away" (Big Mama cover) (Covered by Halmibong (Note: Consists of Yoon Eun-hye, Kota (Sunny Hill), Kwon Jin-ah and Hynn))	2022	159		WSG Wannabe Group Competition
"Wonderful Love" (어마어마해) (Momoland cover) (Covered by WSG Wannabe)	2022	72		WSG Wannabe 12
"At That Moment" (그때 그 순간 그대로 (그그그)) (Song by Gaya-G)	2022	1	KMCA: Platinum (Note: Certification for streaming)	WSG Wannabe 1st Album
"I Missed You" (보고싶었어) (Song by Sa-Fire)	2022	2		WSG Wannabe 1st Album
"Clink Clink" (Song by Oasiso)	2022	5		WSG Wannabe 1st Album
"When I Close My Eyes" (눈을 감으면) (Song by WSG Wannabe)	2022	32		Non-album singles
"Our Season" (우리의 계절) (Song by Sa-Fire (Note: Kwon Jin-ah was not involved in this single))	2022	—		Non-album singles
"To You" (결국엔 너에게 닿아서) (Song by Gaya-G)	2023	32		Non-album singles
"—" denotes song did not chart.

== Awards and nominations ==
Name of the award ceremony, year presented, category, nominee of the award, and the result of the nomination
Award ceremony	Year	Category	Nominee / Work	Result	Ref.
MBC Entertainment Awards	2022	Special Award for Variety	Gaya-G	Won	
Melon Music Awards	2022	Project Music Award	WSG Wannabe	Won	

== See also ==
- Hangout with Yoo
- MSG Wannabe
