= The Village Barber =

2026 South Korean reality show

- Promotional poster
- Hangul: 보검매직컬
- Lit.: Bogum Magical
- RR: Bogeommaejikkeol
- MR: Pogŏmmaejikk'ŏl
- Genre: Reality television
- Directed by: Son Soo-jung
- Starring: Park Bo-gum; Lee Sang-yi; Kwak Dong-yeon
- Country of origin: South Korea
- Original language: Korean
- No. of seasons: 2
- No. of episodes: 10

Production
- Production companies: CJ ENM; Monstera Haus

Original release
- Network: tvN
- Release: January 30, 2026 – present

The Village Barber (Korean: 보검매직컬) is a South Korean reality television show starring Park Bo-gum working as a barber in the countryside together with Lee Sang-yi and Kwak Dong-yeon. It premiered on tvN on January 30, 2026, and airs every Friday at 20:40 (KST). It is also available for streaming on HBO Max and Viki globally.

The series received positive reviews from critics and audiences with praise for the overall production and the cast's sincerity and chemistry. On April 6, 2026, it was confirmed that the second season would air in the second half of 2026.

== Premise ==
Actor Park Bo-gum, who has a license in barbering, opens a barbershop in a remote village in South Korea together with fellow actors and real-life friends Lee Sang-yi and Kwak Dong-yeon, creating bonds and memories with the villagers.

== Cast ==
=== Season 1 ===
==== Main ====
- Park Bo-gum – barber and barbershop owner
- Lee Sang-yi – nail technician and receptionist
- Kwak Dong-yeon – cook and custodian

==== Guests ====
- Park Hae-joon – part-timer
- Choi Dae-hoon – part-timer
- Rain – part-timer
- Yoon Nam-no
- Kim So-hyun

=== Season 2 ===
==== Main ====
- Park Bo-gum – barber and barbershop owner
- Lee Sang-yi – nail technician and receptionist
- Ko Kyung-pyo – cook and custodian

== Production ==
=== Development ===
It is the first show produced by Monstera Haus, a production company founded by ex-MBC and Kakao Entertainment employees Park Jin-kyung and Lee Jae-seok in October 2025. On September 16, 2025, YTN broke the news that tvN is producing an entertainment program starring Park Bo-gum. The network officially confirmed the news the same day.

The program was developed around Park's National Technical Qualifications Certification as a barber which he earned during his mandatory military service in 2022. Wanting to use his skill to volunteer for the elderly, he began planning the show with the production team nearly a year in advance. The show involves Park working as a licensed barber in the countryside. In addition to his barber's license, he trained for a hairdresser's license to cater to female clients. Park had been involved in the location-scouting and interior design concept of the barbershop.

=== Casting ===
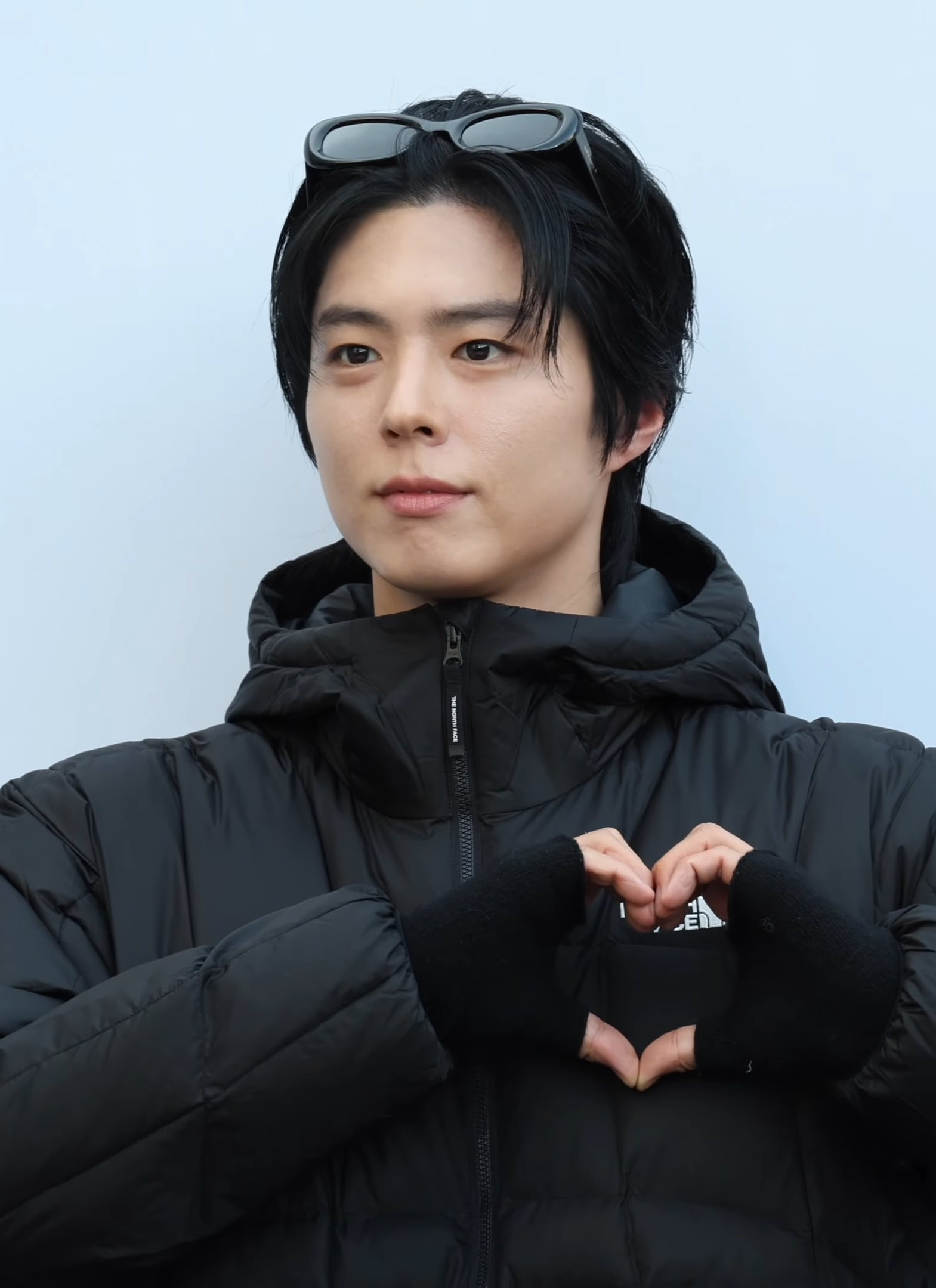
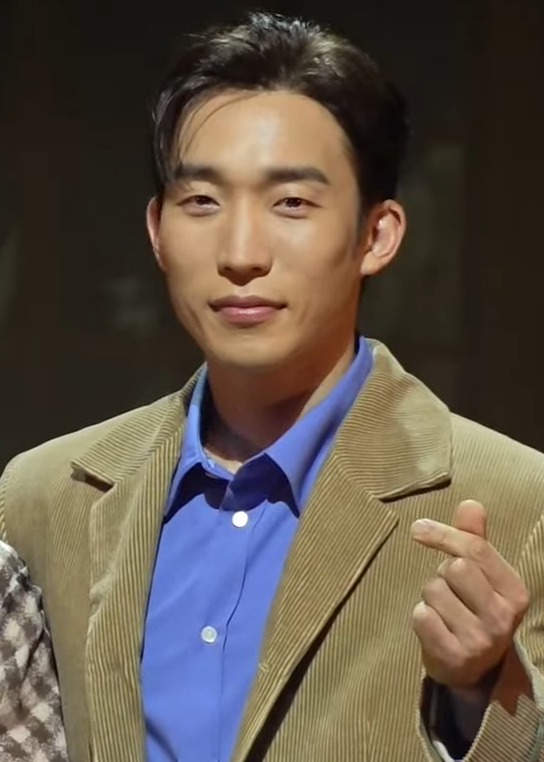
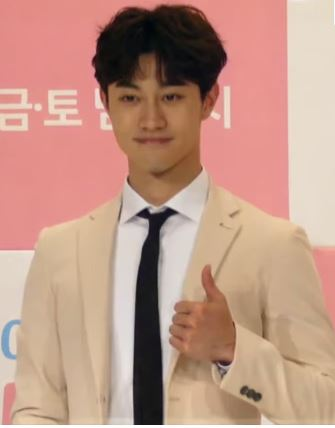
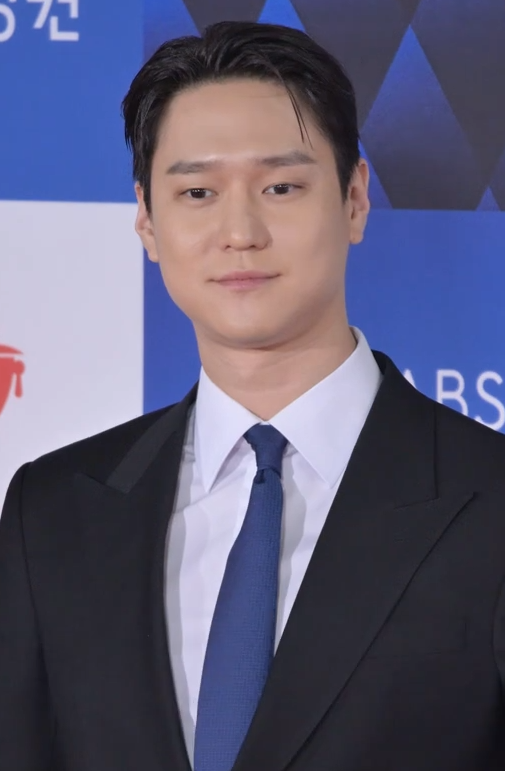
Park Bo-gum (top left) and Lee Sang-yi (top right) appeared in both seasons, while Kwak Dong-yeon (bottom left) appeared in Season 1, and Ko Kyung-pyo (bottom right) joined for Season 2.

In September 2025, casting for the program began with Park Bo-gum. In October 2025, actor Lee Sang-yi, who co-starred with Park in the action-comedy Good Boy (2025), joined the cast. Lee earned a certification as nail technician for the show. The following month, Kwak Dong-yeon, who previously worked with Park in Love in the Moonlight (2016) and Young Actors' Retreat (2022), rounded out the initial lineup. Together, Park, Lee, and Kwak are known as the Geumdongyi trio.

For season 2, Kwak could not join due to enlisting for his mandatory military service in August 2026, and is replaced by Ko Kyung-pyo, who previously co-starred with Park in Reply 1988 and variety show Youth Over Flowers Africa.

=== Filming ===
Bogum Magical (Korean: 보검매직컬; RR: Bogeommaejikkeol) is the name of the barbershop run by Park. The name was coined by Park, who intended for customers to have a magical experience at the shop; it is also a play on the Korean words meaning "magic" and "curl". Set in a village in Muju County, North Jeolla Province, the barbershop and the surrounding neighborhood served as the primary filming locations.

== Release ==
A production press conference was held on January 29, 2026, a day before the show's premiere. It was attended by Park, Lee, Kwak and director-producer Son Soo-jung. The Village Barber airs on tvN every Friday at 20:40 (KST), starting January 30, 2026. It is also available for streaming on TVING and Wavve in South Korea, as well as HBO Max and Viki internationally.

On April 6, 2026, it was confirmed that the second season would air in second quarter of 2026, though a subsequent announcement in July scheduled the premiere for November.

== Episodes ==
No.	Title	Directed by	Original release date
1	"Episode 1"	Son Soo-jung	January 30, 2026
2	"Episode 2"	Son Soo-jung	February 6, 2026
3	"Episode 3"	Son Soo-jung	February 13, 2026
4	"Episode 4"	Son Soo-jung	February 20, 2026
5	"Episode 5"	Son Soo-jung	February 27, 2026
6	"Episode 6"	Son Soo-jung	March 6, 2026
7	"Episode 7"	Son Soo-jung	March 13, 2026
8	"Episode 8"	Son Soo-jung	March 20, 2026
9	"Episode 9"	Son Soo-jung	March 27, 2026
10	"Episode 10"	Son Soo-jung	April 3, 2026

== Reception ==
=== Critical response ===
The Village Barber received positive reviews from critics. The Chosun Ilbo stated that since its premiere episode, the show has garnered praise from critics and viewers alike for its endless charm. Writer Woo Da-bin of Hankook Ilbo praised the show stating that the "production team's meticulous attention to detail is essential" to its enjoyability "including the narrative of the rural setting, the relationships with the villagers, and the barbershop anecdotes". Woo added that the show captures Park Bo-gum's "intense effort and struggles" and "redefines him not just as polite, but as tenacious and dedicated". Writer Yoo Su-yeon of OSEN gave the show a positive review praising Park, Lee Sang-yi, and Kwak Dong-yeon for doing a good job of providing viewers with diverse entertainment. She added that the show's success is based on the cast's chemistry and "the warm hearts revealed from the project's conception and the sincere preparation". Choi Jae-hyuk, reviewing for CBC News, wrote that Park's "meticulous effort and preparedness have earned him [audience's] admiration".

Entertainment writer Lee Moon-won expressed that through The Village Barber, cable network "TvN once again ascends to the throne of the fiercely competitive Friday evening entertainment market". Popular culture critic and Chungwoon University professor Kim Heon-sik opined that the show should usher in a new era to local entertainment where public interest and social value are combined. He added that the show can inspire policy ideas for public barbering and beauty care systems especially for seniors living rural areas.

=== Impact ===
Upon the show's airing, the barbershop, which remained open, became a stopover destination for tourists visiting nearby Deogyusan Mountain and Muju Resort. The locations featured in the show, were further selected by Jeonbuk Special Self-Governing Province as part of a curated travel route linked with K-content. The program aims to attract summer tourists by combining accommodation discounts with diverse tourism content, in conjunction with the Ministry of Culture, Sports and Tourism's 2026 Summer Accommodation Sale Festa, running from June 11 to July 31, 2026.

=== Viewership ===
The Village Barber : South Korea viewers per episode (thousands)

Season	Episode number										Average
Season	1	2	3	4	5	6	7	8	9	10	Average
1	722	801	763	897	957	911	927	732	813	668	TBD

Source: Audience measurement performed nationwide by Nielsen Korea.

Average TV viewership ratings
Ep.	668Original broadcast date	Average audience share (Nielsen Korea)	
Ep.	668Original broadcast date	Nationwide	Seoul
1	January 30, 2026	2.815% (1st)	3.023% (1st)
2	February 6, 2026	3.054% (1st)	3.345% (1st)
3	February 13, 2026	2.615% (1st)	2.662% (1st)
4	February 20, 2026	3.385% (1st)	3.505% (1st)
5	February 27, 2026	3.755% (1st)	4.032% (1st)
6	March 6, 2026	3.611% (1st)	3.739% (1st)
7	March 13, 2026	3.598% (1st)	3.567% (1st)
8	March 20, 2026	2.572% (2nd)	2.600% (2nd)
9	March 27, 2026	3.080% (1st)	3.601% (1st)
10	April 3, 2026	2.479% (1st)	2.712% (1st)
Average		—	—
In the table above, the blue numbers represent the lowest ratings and the red numbers represent the highest ratings.; This drama airs on a cable channel/pay TV which normally has a smaller audience share than free-to-air public broadcasters (KBS, SBS, MBC, and EBS).

== Awards and nominations ==
Name of the award ceremony, year presented, category, nominee of the award, and the result of the nomination
Award ceremony	Year	Category	Nominee / Work	Result	Ref.
ContentAsia Awards	2026	Best Original Reality Programme Made in Asia	The Village Barber	Pending	
Global OTT Awards	2026	Best Variety Show / Reality Television	The Village Barber	Nominated	
