= Parc Jae-jung =

South Korean singer (born 1995)

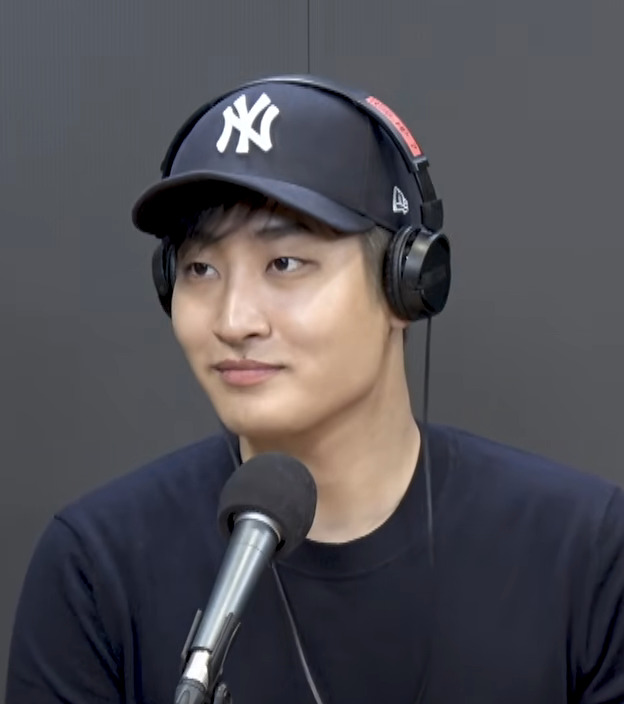
- Parc in 2026

Background information
- Born: December 25, 1995 (age 30); Seoul, South Korea
- Genre: Pop ballad
- Occupations: Singer; songwriter
- Instrument: Guitar
- Years active: 2013–present
- Labels: CJ E&M; Mystic Story; Romantic Factory
- Member of: MSG Wannabe

Korean name
- Hangul: 박재정
- Hanja: 朴宰正
- RR: Bak Jaejeong
- MR: Pak Chaejŏng

Parc Jae-jung (Korean: 박재정; born December 25, 1995) is a South Korean singer. He is the winner of the 2013 television singing competition Superstar K 5 and a member of the R&B project group MSG Wannabe.

== Early life ==
Parc was born in Seoul, South Korea on December 25, 1995. He developed an interest in music at a young age and learned to play the violin, clarinet, and traditional Korean percussion instruments when he was in elementary school. In 2011, he moved with his family to Florida, where his parents worked as farmers.

== Career ==
=== 2013–2014: Superstar K 5, debut and Step 1 ===
Beginning on August 9, 2013, Parc appeared in the fifth season of the television singing competition Superstar K 5. On November 15, Parc was announced as the winner of the competition. He released his pre-debut single "Stalker" on November 20, and on November 22, he made his official debut performance at the 2013 Mnet Asian Music Awards in Hong Kong.

On July 17, 2014, Parc released his first EP, Step 1, which contains five tracks including the lead single "Ice Ice Baby" featuring rapper Beenzino.

=== 2015–2020: Mystic Entertainment, variety show appearances and Lyrics ===
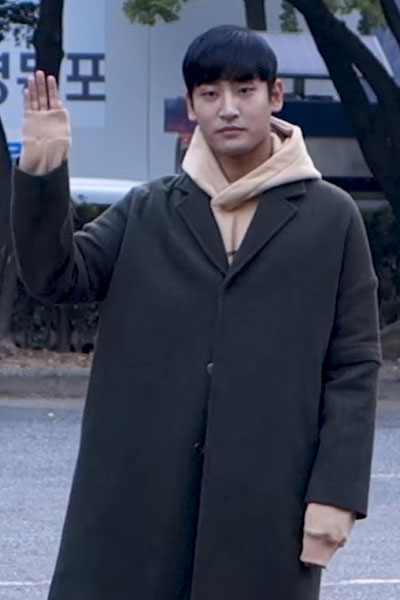
Parc in 2017

In July 2015, Parc joined Mystic Entertainment after his contract with CJ E&M ended. His first release under the label was the collaborative single "Two Men" with Kyuhyun, released on May 19, 2016.

In May 2017, Parc was cast in the first season of the music variety show Snowball Project. He teamed up with Mark Lee of NCT to release the single "Lemonade Love" on July 21, which was produced by Henry Lau and Yoon Jong-shin. In August, Parc was cast in the variety show It's Dangerous Beyond the Blankets.

On June 29, Parc released the single "Focus", which was written by Yoon Jong-shin and Jung Suk-won of 015B. On October 13, Parc released another single, "The Villain", which also written by Yoon Jong-shin and Jung Suk-won. The single is the final in a trilogy of farewell ballads, following "Two Men" and "Focus". On December 18, Parc held his first solo concert, "Mood In December", at Seoul's Hyundai Card Understage.

On June 8, 2018, Parc released the single "Bad Dream", as a part of Mystic Entertainment's music project LISTEN. His next single, "Words", was released on August 4, and is his first self-composed song since debut. Parc released his second EP, Lyrics, the following year on July 1, 2019.

=== 2021–present: Romantic Factory, MSG Wannabe and Alone ===
On February 10, 2021, Parc announced that he would be leaving Mystic Story. On April 2, it was confirmed that Parc signed with Romantic Factory, which is home to rappers Ovan and Vinxen. After signing with new agency, Parc released a song titled "I Loved You" on April 18, 2021.

In May, 2021, Parc was revealed as a member of the project group MSG Wannabe, formed via the variety show Hangout with Yoo. He debuted as a member of the MSG Wannabe sub-unit M.O.M., which saw instant success with its single "Foolish Love". After the show ended, Parc released two new songs titled "Hobby" and "From That Day" on July 27, 2021.

Parc held a solo concert, "Letter 1.5", on May 21 and 22, 2022.

In August 2022 it was announced that Parc will release a self written single "Letter to B" on September 1.

On October 30, 2022, Park decided to cancel the concert due to the Seoul Halloween crowd crush.

Parc released his first studio album, Alone, on April 20, 2023.

Parc released the single "Still Yours" on May 9, 2024, before enlisting into the army on May 21.

On February 6, 2026, Parc announced the duet single, featuring Sullyoon of Nmixx, released on February 25, with releases to his official social media accounts. This collaboration marks his first release following his discharge from the army.

== Discography ==
=== Studio albums ===
Title	Album details	Peak chart positions	Sales
Title	Album details	KOR	Sales
Alone	Released: April 20, 2023; Label: Romantic Factory; Formats: CD, digital download	15	KOR: 2,000
The Live Album	Released: April 24, 2025; Label: Romantic Factory; Formats: CD, digital download	60	KOR: 975

=== Extended plays ===
Title	EP details	Peak chart positions	Sales
Title	EP details	KOR	Sales
Step 1	Released: July 17, 2014; Label: CJ E&M Music; Formats: CD, digital download	15	KOR: 1,391+
Lyrics	Released: July 1, 2019; Label: Mystic Story; Formats: CD, digital download	—	—N/a

=== Singles ===
Title	Year	Peak chart positions	Sales	Certifications	Album
Title	Year	KOR	Sales	Certifications	Album
As lead artist
"Stalker" (첫 눈에)	2013	68	KOR: 29,772		Step 1
"Ice Ice Baby" (얼음땡) (featuring Beenzino)	2014	56	KOR: 67,265		Step 1
"Focus" (시력)	2017	—	—N/a	—N/a	Non-album singles
"The Villain" (악역)	2017	—	—N/a	—N/a	Non-album singles
"Bad Dream" (니가 죽는 꿈)	2018	—	—N/a	—N/a	Listen 026
"Words" (가사)	2018	—	—N/a	—N/a	Non-album singles
"4 years" (4년)	2018	—	—N/a	—N/a	Non-album singles
"Ceiling" (꼬박)	2019	—	—N/a	—N/a	Listen 030
"If Only" (다시 태어날 수 있다면)	2019	—	—N/a	—N/a	Lyrics
"December" (눈)	2019	—	—N/a	—N/a	Non-album single
"Easy Determination" (가벼운 결심)	2020	—	—N/a	—N/a	Listen 034
"I Loved You" (좋았는데)	2021	—	—N/a	—N/a	Non-album singles
"Hobby" (취미)	2021	—	—N/a	—N/a	Non-album singles
"From That Day" (그날의 너)	2021	—	—N/a	—N/a	Non-album singles
"Love Message" (한 걸음)	2022	127	—N/a	—N/a	Non-album singles
"A Letter to B" (B에게 쓰는 편지 박재정)	2022	142	—N/a	—N/a	Non-album singles
"Let's Say Goodbye" (헤어지자 말해요)	2023	4	—N/a	KMCA: Platinum	Alone
"Still Yours" (무슨 일 있었니)	2024	163	—N/a	—N/a	Non-album singles
"Epilogue" (계절의 끝)	2026	101	—N/a	—N/a	Non-album singles
Collaborations
"Two Men" (두 남자) (with Kyuhyun)	2016	66	KOR: 59,916	—N/a	Non-album single
"Passport" (여권) (with Yoon Jong-shin)	2017	—	—N/a	—N/a	His Walk of Life 2017 Yoon Jong-shin
"Lemonade Love" (with Mark)	2017	—	—N/a	—N/a	SM Station Season 2
"XOXO" (with Soyeon of Laboum)	2018	—	—N/a	—N/a	Non-album single
"May 12" (5월 12일) (with 015B)	2018	—	—N/a	—N/a	The Legacy 01
"Yet, we" (아직, 우린) (with Sogag Sogag)	2018	—	—N/a	—N/a	Dalkomm Day #6 (달콤데이#6 아직, 우린)
"Alone" (두 혼자) (with Park Bo-ram)	2019	—	—N/a	—N/a	Non-album singles
"With a Song" (with JeA, Hayoung, Eunkwang, Cheetah)	2020	—	—N/a	—N/a	Non-album singles
"Journey to Atlantis" (상상더하기) (with MSG Wannabe)	2021	7	—N/a	—N/a	MSG Wannabe Top 8 Performance Songs
"If" (만약에) (with Jee Seok-jin, KCM, Wonstein)	2021	19	—N/a	—N/a	MSG Wannabe Top 8 Performance Songs
"Foolish Love" (바라만 본다) (with Jee Seok-jin, KCM, Wonstein)	2021	1	—N/a	—N/a	MSG Wannabe 1st Album
"I Love You" (난 너를 사랑해) (with MSG Wannabe)	2021	25	—N/a	—N/a	MSG Wannabe 1st Album
"Always" (지금 이대로만) (with Sullyoon)	2026	189	—N/a	—N/a	Non-album single
Soundtrack appearances
"Who Are You" (그댄 누군가요)	2014	—	—N/a	—N/a	My Spring Days OST
"Not Gonna Wait"	2017	—	—N/a	—N/a	Live Up to Your Name OST
"Didn't Know" (몰랐어)	2018	—	—N/a	—N/a	Feel Good to Die OST
"Walk with Me" (같이 걷자)	2018	—	—N/a	—N/a	Still 17 OST
"Cassette tape" (카세트 테이프) (with Soyou)	2019	—	—N/a	—N/a	The Call 2 Project No.4
"Like Something" (썸 비슷한) (with Soyou, Hangzoo)	2019	—	—N/a	—N/a	The Call Final Project
"Let's Meet" (만나려 해) (with Park Kyung, Sunwoo Jung-a, Kim Hyun-woo, Song Yuvin, Suran)	2019	—	—N/a	—N/a	Melody Book OST Part 3 (멜로디책방 Part 3)
"Tonight"	2019	—	—N/a	—N/a	The Wind Blows OST
"Ice Doll" (얼음인형)	2019	—	—N/a	—N/a	Melting Me Softly OST
"Sunshine Wind Starlight You" (햇살 바람 별빛 그대)	2019	—	—N/a	—N/a	The Tale of Nokdu OST
"In the Night"	2020	—	—N/a	—N/a	Hi Bye, Mama! OST

=== Album appearances ===
Title	Year	Album
"Should I Say I Love You Again" (다시 사랑한다 말할까)	2020	Immortal Songs: Singing the Legend (Little Star Special)

== Filmography ==
=== Television shows ===
Year	Title	Role	Notes	Ref.
2016	King of Mask Singer	Contestant (Captain Korea)	Episode 63-64	
2016	Real Men	Cast Member	Episode 172–180 (Naval Education and Training Command)	
2017	Battle Trip	Contestant	Episode 49 ('E.ro.parc' Tour)	
2017	It's Dangerous Beyond The Blankets	Cast Member	Season 1 (Episodes 1–4)	
2019	King of Mask Singer	Contestant (Dumulmeori)	Episode 205-206	
2021	Hangout with Yoo	Cast Member	Episodes 91–93, 95-101	
2022	Love Interference	special host	Season 3	
2023	Super Karaoke Survival: VS	Producer	with Roy Kim	

=== Music video appearances ===
Year	Song Title	Artist	Ref.
2017	"Lemonade Love"	Parc Jae-jung, Mark (NCT)	
2021	"I Loved You" (좋았는데)	Parc Jae-jung	
2021	"Only You + Foolish Love" (나를 아는 사람'을 '바라만 본다)	MSG Wannabe	
2021	"Keep your head up" (네가 아는 너)	Lee Dong-hwi	

=== Radio shows ===
Year	Title	Role	Note	Ref.
2021	Noon's Hope Song, Kim Shin-young	Special DJ	July 8; (with Jee Seok-jin)	
2021	Jeon Hyosung 's Dreaming Radio	Special DJ	November 25–26	
2022	Turn up the volume	Special DJ	August 1–7	

== Awards and nominations ==
Name of the award ceremony, year presented, category, nominee of the award, and the result of the nomination
Award ceremony	Year	Category	Nominee / Work	Result	Ref.
Golden Disc Awards	2024	Digital Song Bonsang	"Let's Say Goodbye"	Won	
MAMA Awards	2023	Worldwide Fans' Choice Top 10	Parc Jae-jung	Nominated	
MAMA Awards	2023	Best Vocal Performance – Solo	Parc Jae-jung	Won	
MBC Entertainment Awards	2021	Rookie Award	Hangout with Yoo and I Live Alone	Won	
