= Pegasus Market =

2019 South Korean television series

- Promotional poster
- Hangul: 쌉니다 천리마마트
- Lit.: Cheap Cheollima Mart
- RR: Ssamnida Cheollima mateu
- MR: Ssamnida Ch'ŏllima mat'ŭ
- Genre: Drama Comedy
- Based on: Cheap Cheollima Mart by Kim Gyu-sam
- Developed by: Lee Myung-han
- Written by: Kim Sol-ji
- Directed by: Baek Seung-ryong
- Starring: Kim Byung-chul; Lee Dong-hwi
- Country of origin: South Korea
- Original language: Korean
- No. of episodes: 12

Production
- Camera setup: Single-camera
- Production companies: Studio N; CJ ENM

Original release
- Network: tvN
- Release: September 20 – December 6, 2019

Pegasus Market (Korean: 쌉니다 천리마마트) is a 2019 South Korean television series based on Kim Gyu-sam's webtoon of the same name, starring Kim Byung-chul and Lee Dong-hwi. It aired on tvN every Friday at 23:00 (KST) from September 20 to December 6, 2019.

== Synopsis ==
Pegasus Market, where Moon Seok-goo works as a manager, is in bad shape. Jeong Bok-dong is soon appointed as the new CEO after being demoted within Daema Group. Seok-goo becomes hopeful concerning the market's future, not knowing what Bok-dong's true intentions are: sinking the company in order to take revenge on Daema Group. His plan, however, takes an unexpected turn.

== Cast ==
=== Main ===
- Kim Byung-chul as Jeong Bok-dong

A helpful, kind but cynical director of Daema Group. Looks like a cold person but in reality, he has a soft heart and also has a past that he doesn't want to talk much about: he used to do all the dirty work by executing the CEO's commands, but now he is haunted by his guilt. After messing up during a meeting by failing to capitalize on a new product, he was expelled to be the president of the seemingly abandoned Pegasus Mart. Bok-dong kept trying to install elaborate and destructive plans to push the main Daema Group into bankruptcy throughout the mart but his plans kept backfiring and instead caused the mart to get ever more popular and causing the sales volume to increase rather than decrease as he wanted.

- Lee Dong-hwi as Moon Seok-goo

A recently uni-grad who applied to Daema Group for a job and was sent to Pegasus Mart as a general manager. Always tries his best to keep the mart running wholeheartedly but often foiled by the plans of Bok-dong which often causes Seok-goo stress and despair.

=== Supporting ===
==== People at Pegasus Market ====
- Jung Hye-sung as Jo Mi-ran

Initially sent by Young-goo to spy on Bok-dong, she decided to abandon the mission from the start. Helps the mart in promotional campaigns. Has feelings for Seok-goo.

- Jung Min-sung as Choi Il-nam

An ex-retrenched banker, found the employment flyer for a full-time position in Pegasus Mart, passed the interview by begging for the position and employed on the spot

- Kang Hong-seok as Oh In-bae

A gangster, found the employment flyer for a full-time position in Pegasus Mart, passed the interview by begging for the position and employed on the spot. Became the chief of the "Customer Satisfaction Center"

- Kim Ho-young as Jo Min-dal

A failed rocker & singer, found the employment flyer for a full-time position in Pegasus Mart, passed the interview by begging for the position and employed on the spot

- Kim Gyu-ri as Go Mi-joo

A kid who initially tried to help her deceased father in finding a job as a promise he gave her, went to Pegasus Mart to try her luck with the employment flyer and both her and her deceased father were employed. Mi-joo mans the Bookstore section of the mart

==== Daema Group ====
- Lee Soon-jae as Kim Dae-ma

Chairman of Daema Group, grandfather of Kim Gap

- Park Ho-san as Kwon Young-goo

Chief Finance Officer of Daema Group. Rival of Bok-dong and often finding ways of ruining Bok-dong's chances to return to Daema Group. He was later revealed to have used the failing Pegasus Mart to commit money laundering and shady deals behind the chairman's back

- Lee Gyu-hyun as Kim Gap
  - Choi Ro-woon as young Kim Gap

The grandson of the chairman of Daema Group.

- Bae Jae-won as Park Il-woong

A section head in Daema Group. Reports directly to Young-goo and often does the dirty work for him. He nearly went insane after spying in Pegasus Mart and witnessing the quirkiness of everyone there.

==== Others ====
- Yeonwoo as Kwon Ji-na, as Kwon Young-goo's daughter and an Intern at Pegasus Market. She forms a rivaling relationship with Jo Mi-ran over Moon Seok-goo. (Ep.10, 12)
- Park Doo-shik as Gangster boss
- Cho Seung-hee
- Kim Jae-hwa as Bok-dong's wife.

=== Special appearances ===
- Woo Hyun as Kim Chi-ah (Ep. 1)
- Kim Yeon-ja as herself (Ep. 1)
- Lee Eung-kyung as Seok-goo's mother (Ep. 1)
- Lee Eugene as Sang-tae, Bok-dong's son (Ep. 1, 4)
- Lee Hyun-wook as DM Group psychiatrist (Ep. 10)

== Original soundtrack ==
Pegasus Market OST

Soundtrack album by Various artists
- Recorded: 2019
- Genre: Soundtrack
- Languages: Korean; English
- Labels: Genie Music; Stone Music Entertainment

=== Part 1 ===
Released on September 27, 2019
No.	Title	Lyrics	Music	Artist	Length
1.	"Ppaya Cart" (빠야까라루뚜)	Uhm Ki-yeop; Uhm Ki-hyun	Uhm Ki-yeop; Uhm Ki-hyun	Ppaya	2:04
2.	"Ppaya Cart" (Inst.)		Uhm Ki-yeop; Uhm Ki-hyun		2:04
Total length:					4:08

=== Part 2 ===
Released on October 5, 2019
No.	Title	Lyrics	Music	Artist	Length
1.	"Reload" (다시)	Park Geun-chul; DANI; Jung Su-min	Park Geun-chul; Jung Su-min	Song Yuvin	4:10
2.	"Reload" (Inst.)		Park Geun-chul; Jung Su-min		4:10
Total length:					8:20

== Viewership ==
Pegasus Market : South Korea viewers per episode (thousands)

Season	Episode number												Average
Season	1	2	3	4	5	6	7	8	9	10	11	12	Average
1	808	822	908	732	777	723	613	748	572	606	587	543	703

Source: Audience measurement performed nationwide by Nielsen Media Research.

Average TV viewership ratings
Ep.	Original broadcast date	Average audience share	
Ep.	Original broadcast date	AGB Nielsen	
Ep.	Original broadcast date	Nationwide	Seoul
1	September 20, 2019	3.207%	3.808%
2	September 27, 2019	3.378%	4.001%
3	October 4, 2019	3.299%	4.020%
4	October 11, 2019	2.806%	3.080%
5	October 18, 2019	2.941%	3.670%
6	October 25, 2019	2.951%	3.560%
7	November 1, 2019	2.481%	3.284%
8	November 8, 2019	2.940%	3.539%
9	November 15, 2019	2.355%	2.669%
10	November 22, 2019	2.125%	2.645%
11	November 29, 2019	2.203%	2.857%
12	December 6, 2019	2.208%	2.765%
Average		2.741%	3.325%
In the table above, the blue numbers represent the lowest ratings and the red numbers represent the highest ratings.; This drama aired on a cable channel/pay TV which normally has a relatively smaller audience compared to free-to-air TV/public broadcasters (KBS, SBS, MBC and EBS).

== Spin-off web series ==
A spin-off web series entitled Vroom Vroom Pegasus Market (Korean: 부릉부릉 천리마마트; RR: Bureungbureung Cheollimamateu) premiered on December 13, 2019 on tvN D STORY YouTube channel. It tells the story of Moon Seok-goo (Lee Dong-hwi), Oh In-bae (Kang Hong-seok) and Pielleggu (Choi Kwang-je) who team up in order to steal secrets from their competitor.

== Awards and nominations ==
Year	Award	Category	Recipient	Result	Ref.
2020	56th Baeksang Arts Awards	Technical Award	Kim Ji-soo (Art)	Nominated	
