= Spice Up Our Love =

2024 South Korean television series

- Promotional poster
- Hangul: 사장님의 식단표
- Hanja: 社長님의 食單表
- Lit.: The CEO's Meal Plan
- RR: Sajangnimui sikdanpyo
- MR: Sajangnimŭi siktanp'yo
- Genre: Romantic comedy; Fantasy
- Created by: Kim Hye-young
- Written by: Cho Min-jung
- Directed by: Jung Hoon
- Starring: Lee Sang-yi; Han Ji-hyun
- Country of origin: South Korea
- Original language: Korean
- No. of episodes: 2

Production
- Running time: 47–52 minutes
- Production company: Bon Factory

Original release
- Network: TVING
- Release: October 3, 2024

Related
- No Gain No Love (2024)

Spice Up Our Love (Korean: 사장님의 식단표) is a 2024 South Korean romantic comedy fantasy television series created by Kim Hye-young, written by Jo Min-jung, directed by Jung Hoon, and starring Lee Sang-yi and Han Ji-hyun. The series is a spin-off of Korean drama No Gain No Love by Kim and depicts the love story between a CEO and a nutritionist. It was released on TVING on October 3, 2024, and is available for streaming on Amazon Prime Video in selected regions.

== Synopsis ==
An R-rated romance web novelist named Nam Ja-yeon unexpectedly transforms into Seo Yeon-seo, the female lead of her novel, and gets caught up in an erratic romance with Kang Ha-joon, the novel's male lead.

== Cast and characters ==
- Lee Sang-yi as Kang Ha-joon, CEO of GB Electric.
- Han Ji-hyun as Seo Yeon-seo, a nutritionist.
- Joo Min-kyung as Cha Hee-seong, Ja-yeon's friend.

== Production ==
A spin-off of Korean drama No Gain No Love by Kim Hye-young, the series was developed under the working title The CEO's Meal Plan already finished filming. It was written by Jo Min-jung, directed by Jung Hoon, planned by CJ ENM Studios, and produced by Bon Factory. Lee Sang-yi and Han Ji-hyun were cast in July 2024 and confirmed in August 2024.

== Release ==
Spice Up Our Love was released on TVING on October 3, 2024, and is available to stream in 240 countries on Amazon Prime Video.
