= 2021 MBC Entertainment Awards =

21st edition of award ceremony

- Official logo
- Awarded for: Excellence in variety entertainment
- Date: December 29, 2021
- Venue: MBC Public Hall, Sangam-dong, Mapo-gu, Seoul
- Country: South Korea
- Presented by: MBC
- Hosted by: Jun Hyun-moo; Lee Sang-yi; Kim Se-jeong
- First award: 1990

Highlights
- Grand Prize: Yoo Jae-suk
- Entertainment Program of the Year Award: Hangout with Yoo
- Website: 2021 MBC Entertainment Awards

Television/radio coverage
- Network: MBC
- Runtime: Approx. 240 minutes
- Viewership: Ratings: 7.2%; Viewership: 1.368 million viewers

The 2021 MBC Entertainment Awards (Korean: 2021 MBC 방송연예대상) presented by Munhwa Broadcasting Corporation (MBC), took place on December 29, 2021, at MBC Public Hall in Sangam-dong, Mapo-gu, Seoul. It was hosted by Jun Hyun-moo, Lee Sang-yi and Kim Se-jeong, and aired on December 29, 2021, at 20.45 (KST). Yoo Jae-suk won the Grand Prize for Hangout with Yoo for second year in a row.

== Nominations and winners ==
- (Winners denoted in **bold**)

| Grand Prize (Daesang) | Entertainer of the Year Award | Program of the Year |
|---|---|---|
| **Yoo Jae-suk – Hangout with Yoo**; Kim Gu-ra; Kim Sung-joo; Park Na-rae; Lee Young-ja; Jun Hyun-moo | **Kim Gu-ra**; **Kim Sung-joo**; **Park Na-rae**; **Yoo Jae-suk**; **Lee Young-ja**; **Jun Hyun-moo** | **Hangout with Yoo**; I Live Alone; King of Mask Singer; Radio Star; Where is My Home |
Top Excellence Award
| Variety Category | | Radio Category |
| Male | Female | Radio Category |
| **Ahn Jung-hwan – Buddies in the Wild**; **Kian84 – I Live Alone** | **Shin Bong-sun – Hangout with Yoo, King of Mask Singer** | **Jang Sung-kyu – Good Morning FM It is Jang Sung-kyu** |
Excellence Award
| Variety Category | | Radio Category |
| Male | Female | Radio Category |
| **Jang Dong-min – Where is My Home** | **Hong Hyun-hee – Omniscient Interfering View** | **Moon Cheon-shik – Jung Sun-hee, Moon Chun-sik's Age of Radio**; **Musi, Ahn Young-mi – This is Ahn Young-mi, the two o’clock date** |
| Music/Talk Category | | **Moon Cheon-shik – Jung Sun-hee, Moon Chun-sik's Age of Radio**; **Musi, Ahn Young-mi – This is Ahn Young-mi, the two o’clock date** |
| **Yoo Se-yoon – Radio Star** | | **Moon Cheon-shik – Jung Sun-hee, Moon Chun-sik's Age of Radio**; **Musi, Ahn Young-mi – This is Ahn Young-mi, the two o’clock date** |
Rookie Award
| Variety Category | | Radio Category |
| Male | Female | Radio Category |
| **Parc Jae-jung – Hangout with Yoo, I Live Alone** | **Mijoo – Hangout with Yoo** | **Jeong Jun-ha** & **Shin Ji – Jeong Jun-ha & Shin Ji's Single Show** |
| Best Writer of the Year Award | | Scriptwriter of the Year |
| Radio | Current Events and Cultural Programs | Scriptwriter of the Year |
| **Park Se-hoon – The Economy in the Hands of Lee Jin-woo** | **Kan Min-joo – PD Note** | **Park Hyeon-jung – Radio Star** |
| Achievement Award | Popularity Award | Best Teamwork Award |
| **Ha Chun-hwa** | **Key – I Live Alone**; **Sandara Park – King of Mask Singer, I Live Alone**; **Kim Jong-min – Hangout with Yoo, Those Who Cross the Line - Master X** | **MSG Wannabe – Hangout with Yoo** |
| MC Award | | Best Couple Award |
| Male | Female | Best Couple Award |
| **Boom – Where is My Home, Buddies in the Wild** | **Park Seon-young – At Work Today** | **Yoo Jae-seok, Mijoo & Haha – Hangout with Yoo**; Yang Se-hyung & Yoo Byung-jae – Omniscient Interfering View; Key & Kian84 – I Live Alone; Jeong Jun-ha & Shin Bong-sun – Hangout with Yoo; Hur Jae & Kim Byung-hyun – Buddies in the Wild; Hong Hyun-hee & Im Jeong-su (Cheonan Fatty) – Omniscient Interfering View |
| PD's Award | Best Entertainer Award | **Yoo Jae-seok, Mijoo & Haha – Hangout with Yoo**; Yang Se-hyung & Yoo Byung-jae – Omniscient Interfering View; Key & Kian84 – I Live Alone; Jeong Jun-ha & Shin Bong-sun – Hangout with Yoo; Hur Jae & Kim Byung-hyun – Buddies in the Wild; Hong Hyun-hee & Im Jeong-su (Cheonan Fatty) – Omniscient Interfering View |
| **I Live Alone** | **Yang Se-hyung – Where is My Home, Omniscient Interfering View**; **Yoo Byung-jae – Those Who Cross the Line - Master X, Omniscient Interfering View** | **Yoo Jae-seok, Mijoo & Haha – Hangout with Yoo**; Yang Se-hyung & Yoo Byung-jae – Omniscient Interfering View; Key & Kian84 – I Live Alone; Jeong Jun-ha & Shin Bong-sun – Hangout with Yoo; Hur Jae & Kim Byung-hyun – Buddies in the Wild; Hong Hyun-hee & Im Jeong-su (Cheonan Fatty) – Omniscient Interfering View |
| Digital Contents Award | Best Character Award | Contribution Award in Radio Category |
| **Transform My Home - Spin-off of Where is My Home** | **Jeong Jun-ha** and **Haha – Hangout with Yoo** | **NC Universe** |
Special Awards
| Variety Category | Current Events and Cultural Programs | Radio Category |
| **Kwon Yu-ri, Aiki, Ock Joo-hyun** & **Jeon So-yeon – Teachers of My Teenage Girl** | **Kang Sa-som – Desirable TV**; **Oh Eun-young – MBC Documentary Special**; **Jung Jun-hee – MBC 100 Minute Debate** | **Yeom Min-joo – 57 Traffic Report**; **Heo Il-hu – Politics Insider** |

== Presenters ==
| Order | Presenter(s) | Award(s) | Ref. |
|---|---|---|---|
| 1 | Park Na-rae and Anupam Tripathi | Rookie Awards | |
| 2 | Hong Hyun-hee and Jasson | Scriptwriter of the Year Award; Digital Contents Award | |
| 3 | Kim Jong-min and Haha | Special Award | |
| 4 | Yoo Byung-jae and Jonathan | MC Awards | |
| 5 | Hwang Jae-gyun and Yujeong (Brave Girls) | Best Teamwork Award | |
| 6 | Song Eun-i and Kim Sook | Achievement Award | |
| 7 | Boom and Kim Byung-hyun | Popularity Award | |
| 8 | Yoo Se-yoon and Jang Dong-min | Best Couple Award | |
| 9 | Sung Hoon and Hwasa | Best Character Award; Best Entertainer Award | |
| 10 | Kim Gu-ra and Ahn Young-mi | PD's Award | |
| 11 | Aiki and Yang Se-hyung | Excellence Award in Radio Category; Female Excellence Award | |
| 12 | Jeong Jun-ha and Shin Bong-sun | Male Excellence Award in Music/talk Category; Male Excellence Award in Variety Category | |
| 13 | Kim Seong-ju and Ahn Jung-hwan | Program of the Year | |
| 14 | Jee Seok-jin and Simon Dominic | Top Excellence Awards | |
| 15 | Yu Jae-suk and Lee Hyo-ri | Grand Prize (Daesang) | |

== Performances ==
| Order | Artist | Act performed | Ref. |
|---|---|---|---|
| 1 | MSG Wannabe | | |
| 2 | Hook! | | |
| 3 | Brave Girls | | |
| 4 | TAN | | |

== See also ==
- 2021 KBS Entertainment Awards
- 2021 SBS Entertainment Awards
