= Lee Sang-yi (actor) =

South Korean actor (born 1991)

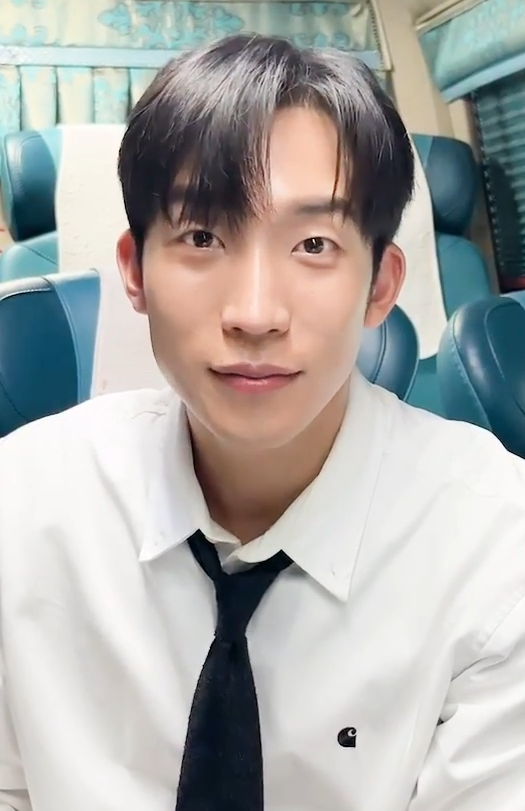
- Lee in December 2023
- Born: November 27, 1991 (age 34); Ansan, Gyeonggi, South Korea
- Education: Korea National University of Arts
- Occupations: Actor; singer
- Years active: 2014–present
- Agent: Chorokbaem Entertainment

Korean name
- Hangul: 이상이
- Hanja: 李相二
- RR: I Sangi
- MR: I Sangi

Lee Sang-yi (Korean: 이상이; born November 27, 1991) is a South Korean actor and singer known for his work on stage and screen. He debuted in theater in 2014 and has since acted in several plays and musicals. He gained wider recognition for his leading roles in dramas, notably, Bloodhounds (2023–present), Spice Up Our Love (2023), and Good Boy (2025). As a singer, he is best known for being a member of the vocal group MSG Wannabe.

== Early life and education ==
Lee Sang-yi was born in 1991 in Ansan, Gyeonggi Province. His interest in acting began during his participation in a school production of The Sound of Music at Jeongji Elementary School. While attending Wonil Middle School, Lee's father encouraged him to enroll in a local acting academy, where he also studied tap dancing. Lee decided to pursue acting professionally and informed his parents of his intention to attend an arts high school. He subsequently enrolled in the Department of Theater and Film at Anyang Art High School.

During his time at Anyang Arts High School, Lee served as student council president. He sought this position to foster interaction with students across different departments. His campaign involved performing songs on guitar for peers before school and establishing a Cyworld club to connect with potential classmates. This proactive engagement led to his election and continued leadership roles.

In 2008, while still in high school, Lee won first place in the J-Tune Company UCC contest, showcasing his dance abilities with a performance of Rain's "Rainism". His clip was circulated on platforms such as Daum TV Pod, Pikicast, and YouTube. During this period, Lee also explored various career paths, including guitarist, professional gamer, and stage designer, before ultimately choosing acting as it integrated his diverse interests.

Lee enrolled in the School of Drama at Korea National University of Arts, joining the Department of Acting's Class of 2010. His peers from the same batch included Ahn Eun-jin, Kim Go-eun, Lee Yoo-young, Park So-dam, Kim Sung-cheol, and Lee Hwi-jong. During his studies, he served as the head of the acting department's class.

== Career ==
=== 2014–2019: Theater beginnings ===
Following his mandatory military service as a duty police officer at the National Police Agency, Lee Sang-yi debuted in the musical Grease in 2014. He subsequently appeared in various musicals, including Runway Beat and Legendary Little Basketball Team.

In 2015, Lee performed as Peter in Bare: The Musical. That same year, he was cast as Jang Seon-jae in the musical Infinite Power, which marked actor Park Hee-soon's directorial debut. Lee noted that Park, a former member of the Mokhwa theater company, directed with an emphasis on individual actor's strengths, stating, "Having been an actor himself, the director understands the actor's mindset better than anyone else."

In 2016, Lee and Kang Young-seok were jointly cast as Nathan Leopold in the Korean production of Stephen Dolginoff's musical Thrill Me. Lee's portrayal of Nathan emphasized a mild-mannered yet logically acute character. Directed by Park Ji-he, the production ran from February 19 to June 12, 2016, and Lee's performance garnered attention for its emotional intensity. In 2016, his stage roles also included Benny in In the Heights and Baek-seok in Me, Natasha, and the White Donkey.

In 2017, Lee participated in the Mongni Music Drama Concert 2017 [Grown Up], which ran at KT&G Sangsang Art Hall from February 16 to 26. He dedicated five weeks to rehearsing choreography from the film La La Land with Park Ji-eun; their dance cover was posted on YouTube in March 2017 and achieved widespread popularity. In April, Lee performed in the play Crazy Kiss, followed by the Korean premiere of Guards At The Taj! in August. Later that year, he made his television debut as Oh Dal-soo in the drama Manhole and appeared as Oh Dong-hwan in the Prison Playbook series in November. Despite his television appearances, he maintained his commitment to stage performances.

In 2018, Lee took on a supporting role in the television musical romantic comedy To. Jenny, appearing alongside Kim Sung-cheol and Jung Chae-yeon. His stage work in 2018 included the musical Red Book, where he played Brown, and a co-starring role in Today's Show - Moving Day. In 2019, Lee portrayed Elvis impersonator Casey in the musical The Legend of Georgia McBridealongside Park Eun-seok and Kang Young-seok. This musical, written by American playwright Matthew Lopez, had premiered in the United States in 2014. In the same year, Lee appeared on television as an antagonist in Special Labor Inspector and as baseball coach Yang Seung-yeop in When the Camellia Blooms.

=== 2020–2022: Breakthrough roles and debut as singer ===
In 2020, Lee starred in the 100-episode weekend drama Once Again. He played Yoon Jae-seok, a dentist and the younger brother of Yoon Gyu-jin, portrayed by Lee Sang-yeob. His romantic storyline with Lee Cho-hee's character became a fan favorite, with their on-screen pairing affectionately known as the "Sadon Couple" or "national in-laws." This performance earned them the Best Couple Award at the 2020 KBS Drama Awards, where Lee also received the Best New Actor Award. The drama's success considerably boosted his public recognition.

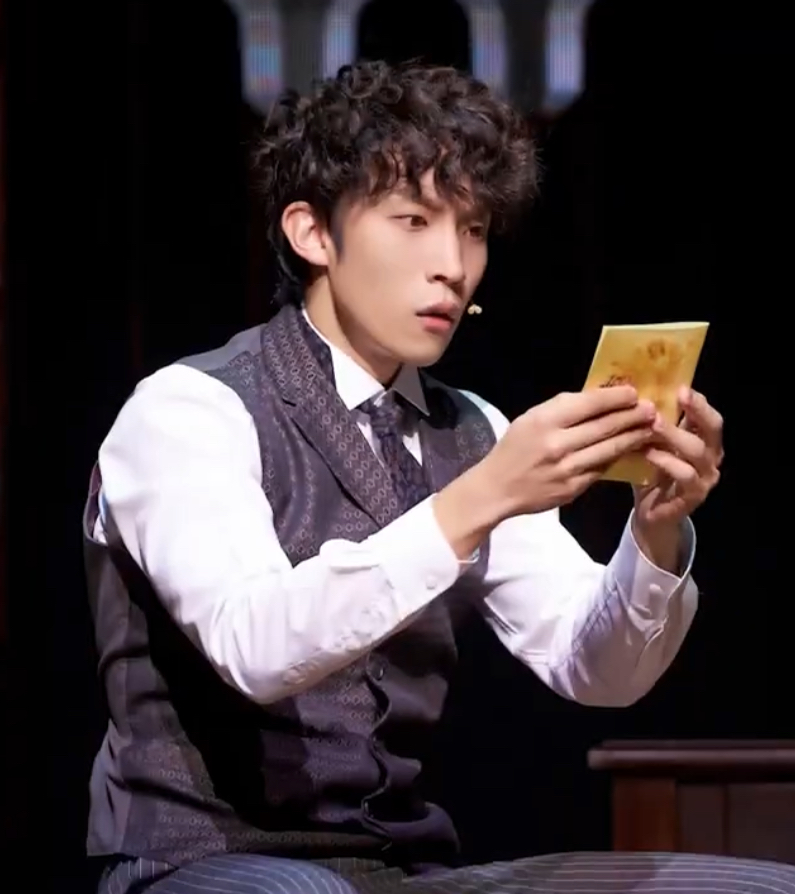
Lee in a theater production of Love and Murder in February 2022

After a two-year hiatus from musical theater, Lee returned in February 2022 to perform in A Gentleman's Guide to Love and Murder. He took on the role of Monty Navarro, a character determined to become a count by eliminating eight heirs of the D'Ysquith family. Lee's portrayal, which blended comedic elements with solid acting, was well-received by audiences, who noted his "nerd beauty" and strong performance.

Lee maintained a busy schedule in 2021. In May, he joined the cast of the KBS2 drama Youth of May as Lee Soo-chan, a resolute individual managing family responsibilities and a business in 1980s Gwangju. His authentic portrayal, which explored themes of love, family, and ambition amidst challenges, was critically praised. Also in May 2021, Lee appeared on the variety show Hangout with Yoo and debuted as a member of MSG Wannabe's sub-unit JSDK.

In June 2021, he was confirmed for tvN drama Hometown Cha-Cha-Cha, portraying Ji Sung-hyun, a workaholic variety show director with an optimistic demeanor. For the drama, Lee covered the song "Love is Forgotten" by Hareem and contributed to the original soundtrack with his single "I Hope You're Happy," released on October 17, 2021. On November 24, 2021, leveraging the popularity of Hometown Cha-Cha-Cha, Lee reprised his role as Ji Sung-hyun and became a virtual guide for Gongjin VR tour. This initiative, a collaboration between Studio Dragon, Korea Tourism Organization, and LG U+, utilized LG U+'s XR platform U+DIVe to create virtual reality content aimed at promoting South Korean tourist destinations through drama content.

In November 2021, Lee once again performed as Monty Navarro in the musical A Gentleman's Guide to Love and Murder. Concurrently, he confirmed his appearance in the Netflix Original Series Bloodhounds, featuring on three young individuals entering the private loan world and encountering a formidable force. Lee concluded 2021 by serving as an MC for the 2021 MBC Entertainment Awards with Jun Hyun-moo and Kim Se-jeong.

=== 2023–present: Leading roles ===
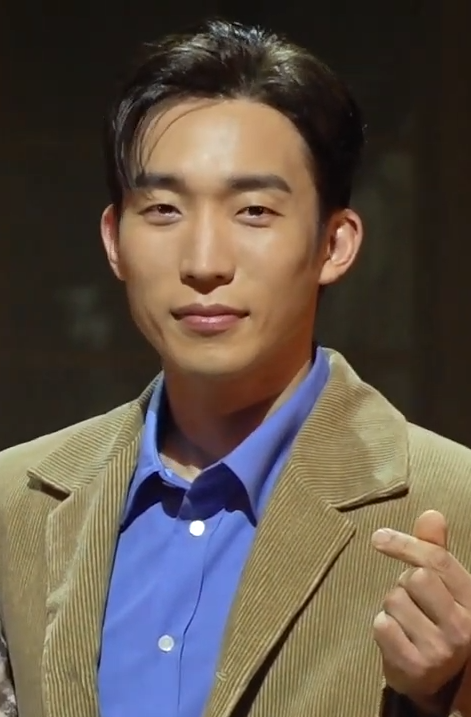
Lee at the press conference of the play Shakespeare in Love

In 2023, Lee took part in Kim Dong-yeon's play Shakespeare in Love, adapted from the 1998 film of the same name. He shared the role of William Shakespeare with Jung Moon-sung and Kim Sung-cheol in a triple cast.The play received favorable reviews and Lee's performance was praised by critics and audience.

In 2024, Lee returned to the small screen in the romantic comedy No Gain No Love as CEO Bok Gyu-heon. The chaebol businessman posts negative comments about a romance novelist, portrayed by Han Ji-hyeon, but later falls in love with her. The couple was such a hit that the creators added a two-episode spin-off titled Spice Up Our Love (2023) starring Lee and Han as a couple trapped in a romance novel.

He next starred as a former silver medalist fencer in JTBC’s action-comedy Good Boy (2025) alongside Park Bo-gum and directed by Shim Na-yeon. In the second half of 2025, Lee reprised his role as William Shakespeare in the play Shakespeare in Love.

In 2026, Lee reunited with Good Boy co-star Park Bo-gum to star in TvN's television show The Village Barber. For the show, Lee earned his National Technical Qualifications Certification as a nail technician. Later, he made a special appearance as Captain Hwang Seok-ho in The Legend of Kitchen Soldier.

== Filmography ==
Key
†	Denotes films that have not yet been released

=== Film ===
Year	Title	Role	Notes	Ref.
2014	Taxi Driver	Ji Hoon	Short film	
2014	Slow Video	Police radio		
2016	Call Me When You Eat.	Repayment	Korea National University of Arts (graduation work)	
2016	Aend	Man	Korea National University of Arts (graduation work)	
2016	Coward	Pumice stone	Short film	
2019	Battle of Noryang	Huijung	Short film	
2020	Hitman: Agent Jun	NIS agent		
2023	Single in Seoul	Byeong-su		
2024	Love in the Big City	Min-jun		
TBA	Dochabi	Park Se-ryoung	Netflix film	

=== Television series ===
Year	Title	Role	Notes	Ref.
2017	Manhole	Oh Dal-soo		
2017	Andante	Moon Sung-Jun		
2017	Prison Playbook	Oh Dong-hwan		
2017	Oh, the Mysterious	Economics Lee		
2018	Suits	Park Chul-soon	Cameo (Episode 1–3)	
2018	To. Jenny	Yeom Dae-seong		
2018	Voice 2	Wang Ko	Cameo (Episode 6–7)	
2018	The Third Charm	Hyeon sang-hyeon		
2018	Quiz of God 5: Reboot	Park Jae-seung	Cameo (Episode 1–2)	
2019	Special Labor Inspector	Yang Tae-soo		
2019	Nokdu Flower	Merchant	Cameo	
2019	When the Camellia Blooms	Yang Seung-yeop		
2020	Once Again	Yoon Jae-seok		
2021	Youth of May	Lee Soo-chan		
2021	Hometown Cha-Cha-Cha	Ji Seong-hyun		
2021	Yumi's Cells	Ji U-gi	Cameo (Episode 1,7)	
2022	Poong, the Joseon Psychiatrist	Kim Yun-gyeom	Cameo (Episode 2)	
2023	Crash Course in Romance	YouTuber Hack Insa Man	Cameo (Episode 9)	
2023	Han River Police	Ko Ki-seok		
2023	My Demon	Joo Seok-hoon		
2023–present	Bloodhounds	Hong Woo-jin		
2024	No Gain No Love	Bok Gyu-heon		
2024	Spice Up Our Love	Kang Ha-joon	Spin-off of No Gain No Love	
2025	Good Boy	Kim Jong-hyeon		
2026	Boyfriend on Demand	a firefighter	Special appearances	
2026	The Legend of Kitchen Soldier	Capt. Hwang Seok-ho	Special appearances	
2026	A Bona Fide Killer	Lee Dong-jin		

=== Television show ===
Year	Title	Role	Notes	Ref.
2020	Law of the Jungle in Ulleungdo & Dokdo	Cast member	Episode 430–431	
2021	Hangout with Yoo	Cast member	Part of MSG Wannabe; Episodes 90–101	
2022	Besties in Wonderland	Cast member		
2026	The Village Barber	Cast member		

=== Hosting ===
Year	Event/ Show	Notes	Ref.
2021	2021 MBC Entertainment Awards	with Jun Hyun-moo and Kim Se-jeong	

=== Music video appearances ===
Year	Song title	Artist	Ref.
2018	"I Forgot" (잊고 지냈었다)	Ji Ji-jin	
2016	"Signal of 1 billion light years" (10억광년의 신호)	Lee Seung-hwan	
2022	"Do You Want to Hear" (듣고 싶을까)	MSG Wannabe MOM	
2026	"hyang"	Wave to Earth	

== Stage ==
=== Concert ===
Concert performances
Year	Title		Role	Theater	Date	Ref.
Year	English	Korean	Role	Theater	Date	Ref.
2014	Musical Public Housewarming Concert	Musical Public 집들이 콘서트	Singer	#1 Rising Star Project	July 7, 2014	
2015	Big Star Concert Embracing the Moon	달을 품은 큰 별 콘서트	Singer		September 23, 2015	
2016	2016 Legendary Concert	2016 전설의 콘써트	Singer	TIOEM 1st Theater	January 7 – 10, 2016	
2016	Carbonated Boys	탄산소년단	Singer	Hana Tour V-Hall	March 14, 2016	
2017	Monni Concert	몽니 콘서트	Singer	KT&G 상상마당 대치아트홀	February 16 – 26, 2017	
2017	2017 Seoul Starlight Musical Festival	2017 서울 스타라이트 뮤지컬 페스티벌	Singer	Olympic Park 88 Jandimadang	September 2 – 3, 2017	
2018	Today's Show - Moving Day	오늘의 쇼 - 이사하는 날	Singer	Baegam Art Hall	April 29, 2018	
2022	Davinci Motel	다빈치모텔	Singer	Hyundai Card Itaewon Space	October 14, 2022 – October 16, 2022	
2023	MOM Tour Concert 〈MSG Wannabe〉 in Jeonju	MOM 투어 콘서트 〈MSG워너비〉 in 전주	Singer	Jeonbuk National University Samsung Cultural Centre	April 15, 2023	
2023	MOM Tour Concert 〈MSG Wannabe〉 in Seoul	MOM 투어 콘서트 〈MSG워너비〉 in 서울	Singer	KBS Arena	April 22, 2023	

=== Musical ===
Musical play performances
Year	Title		Role	Theater	Date	Ref.
Year	English	Korean	Role	Theater	Date	Ref.
2013	How to Make a Star	별을 만나는 방법	Minseop			
2013	X-Wedding		Boyfriend			
2014	Sarah's House	세라의 집	Nasa			
2014	Grease	그리스	Doody			
2015	Runway Beat	런웨이 비트	Peter	Arko Art Theater, Main Theater	January 31, 2015 – February 8, 2015	
2015	Bare the Musical	베어 더 뮤지컬	Peter	Doosan Art Center, Yeongang Hall	June 17, 2015 – August 23, 2015	
2015–2016	Infinite Power	무한동력	Jang Sun-jae	TIOEM 1st Theater	September 4, 2015 – January 3, 2016	
2016	Thrill Me	쓰릴미	Me	Yes24 Stage 2nd Theater	February 19, 2016 – June 12, 2016	
2016	Thrill Me	쓰릴미	Me	Mokpo Culture & Arts Center, Main Theater	July 9, 2016 – July 10, 2016	
2016	Experimental Boy	익스페리멘탈 보이	Kevin	CJ Azit Daehakro	October 4, 2016 – October 5, 2016	
2016	Me and Natasha and the White Donkey	나와 나타샤와 흰 당나귀	Baekseok	Daehakro Dream Art Center 2nd Theater	November 5, 2016 – January 22, 2017	
2016	In the Heights	인 더 하이츠	Benny	Seoul Arts Center CJ Towol Theater	December 20, 2016 – February 12, 2017	
2018	Red Book	레드북	Brown	Sejong Cultural Center M Theater	February 6, 2018 – March 30, 2018	
2018	Il Tenore	일 테노레	Lee Su-han	Wooran Cultural Foundation	December 3, 2018	
2020–2021	A Gentleman's Guide to Love and Murder	젠틀맨스 가이드	Monty Navarro	Hongik University Daehakro Art Center Main Theater	November 20, 2020 – March 1, 2021	
2021–2022	A Gentleman's Guide to Love and Murder	젠틀맨스 가이드	Monty Navarro	Kwanglim Arts Center BBCH Hall	November 13, 2021 – February 20, 2022	

=== Theater ===
Theater play performances
Year	Title		Role	Theater	Date	Ref.
Year	English	Korean	Role	Theater	Date	Ref.
2016	Real Solution	레알솔루트	Yoo Min-jun			
2017	Crazy Kiss	미친키스	Jang Jung	TIOEM 1st Theater	April 11, 2017 – May 14, 2017	
2017	Guard of Taj Mahal	타지마할의 근위병	Babur	Yes24 Stage 2nd Theater	August 1, 2017 – October 15, 2017	
2019	The Legend of Georgia McBride	조지아 맥브라이드의 전설	Casey	Uniplex 2nd Theater	November 27, 2019 – February 23, 2020	
2019	Theatre Centre's repertoire 'Us'	연극원 래퍼토리 '우리'		Graduation performance of Korea National University of Arts		
2023	Shakespeare in Love	셰익스피어 인 러브	William Shakespeare	Seoul Arts Center CJ Towol Theater	January 28, 2023 – March 26, 2023	
2023	Shakespeare in Love	셰익스피어 인 러브	William Shakespeare	Sejong Center for the Performing Arts	April 8, 2023 – April 9, 2023	
2023	Shakespeare in Love	셰익스피어 인 러브	William Shakespeare	Icheon Art Hall, Grand Theater	April 15, 2023 – April 16, 2023	
2025	Shakespeare in Love	셰익스피어 인 러브	William Shakespeare	CJ Towol Theater	July 5, 2025 – September 14, 2025	

== Discography ==
=== Soundtrack appearances ===
Title	Year	Album
"Grab Me" (Choi Nakta cover) (Kim Sung-cheol featuring Lee Sang-yi)	2018	To. Jenny OST Part 1
"Why Am I Like This" (내가 왜 이렇게)	2020	Once Again OST Part 5
"Hope for Happiness" (행복했으면 좋겠어)	2021	Hometown Cha-Cha-Cha OST
"A World For Us" (둘만의 세상)	2024	Spice Up Our Love OST

=== With MSG Wannabe ===
Title	Year	Album
"Journey To Atlantis" (상상더하기) (with MSG Wannabe)	2021	MSG Wannabe Top 8 Performance Songs
"Resignation" (체념) (with Kim Jung-min, Simon Dominic, Lee Sang-yi)	2021	MSG Wannabe Top 8 Performance Songs
"Only You" (나를 아는 사람) (with Kim Jung-min, Simon Dominic, Lee Sang-yi)	2021	MSG Wannabe 1st Album
"I Love You" (난 너를 사랑해) (with MSG Wannabe)	2021	MSG Wannabe 1st Album

== Awards and nominations ==
Name of the award ceremony, year presented, category, nominee of the award, and the result of the nomination
Award ceremony	Year	Category	Nominee / Work	Result	Ref.
APAN Star Awards	2021	Excellence Award, Actor in a Serial Drama	Once Again	Won	
Asia Model Awards	2021	Popular Star Award	Hometown Cha-Cha-Cha, Youth of May	Won	
Blue Dragon Series Awards	2026	Best Supporting Actor	The Legend of Kitchen Soldier	Nominated	
Brand of the Year Awards	2021	Rising Star Actor	Lee Sang-yi	Nominated	
KBS Drama Awards	2020	Best New Actor	Once Again	Won	
KBS Drama Awards	2020	Netizen Award, Actor	Once Again	Nominated	
KBS Drama Awards	2020	Best Couple Award	Lee Sang-yi with Lee Cho-hee; Once Again	Won	
KBS Drama Awards	2021	Best Supporting Actor	Youth of May	Nominated	
Korea Drama Awards	2023	Excellence Award, Actor	Bloodhounds	Won	
Korea Musical Awards	2017	Best New Actor	Me and Natasha and the White Donkey	Nominated	
MBC Entertainment Awards	2021	Best Teamwork Award	Hangout with Yoo	Won	
Yegreen Musical Awards	2016	Best New Actor	Infinite Power	Nominated	
