= Miraclass =

South Korean crossover quartet formed on Phantom Singer 2

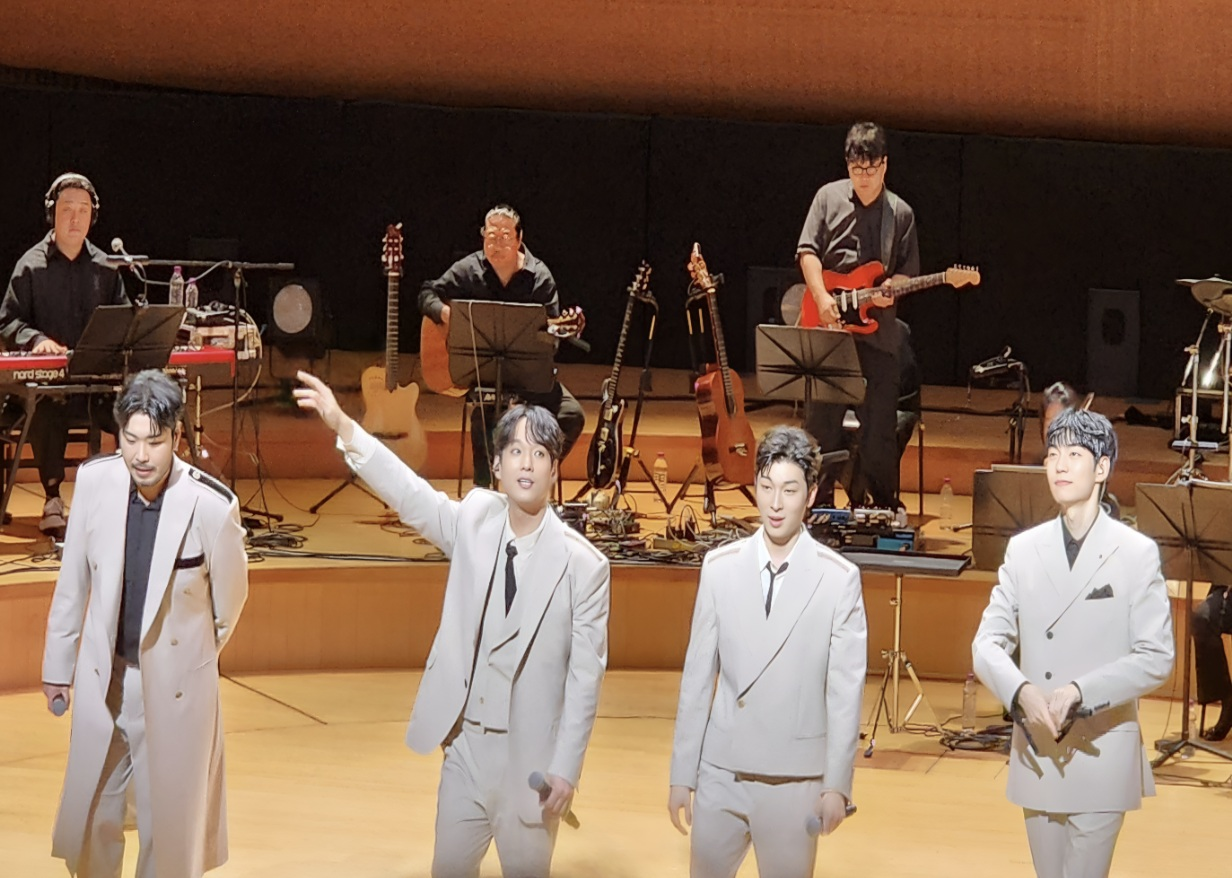
- Miraclass at Live Life Like: Miraclass Inside concert at Lotte Concert Hall, Seoul in October 2025

Background information
- Origin: South Korea
- Genres: Classical crossover, Popera
- Years active: 2017–present
- Label: Library Company
- Members: Julian Jootaek Kim; Phillip Jeong; Kang-hyun Park; Tain Han

Miraclass (Korean: 미라클라스) is a South Korean crossover-quartet formed in 2017 on the JTBC audition program, Phantom Singer 2. The group consists of baritone Julian Jootaek Kim, tenor Phillip Jeong, pop tenor Kang-hyun Park, and bass Tain Han. They were the runner-up team on Phantom Singer 2. They participated in Phantom Singer concerts, released their album Romantica in 2018, and held their own concerts.

The members of the quartet pursued individual projects: Julian Jootaek Kim performed operas in Italy, and played the Phantom in the musical The Phantom of the Opera. Kang-hyun Park performed protagonist roles in musicals like The Man Who Laughs, and Mozart!, Hadestown, and Dear Evan Hansen, and appeared in a TV drama. Jeong and Han formed the jazz/easy listening duo "Feel in." Phillip Jeong released classical albums, and Tain Han has been producing adult-oriented and animation rock music in the indie scene and releasing albums. During the COVID-19 pandemic, they appeared in Phantom Singer All Stars.

The group conducted a national tour in 2022 and engages with fans through their YouTube channel, launched in 2021.

== Formation (2017) ==
=== Phantom Singer 2 ===
Phantom Singer is a television show designed to form male crossover quartet groups through a competition. After the first season's successful launch in 2016, JTBC aired the second season in 2017. The Phantom Singer series features participants, including classical vocalists, musical actors, K-pop idols, traditional Korean musicians (국악인), and amateurs from various fields. Members of Miraclass emerged from these auditions, forming the group as part of the show's process.

Kang-hyun Park, a musical actor was the first of the members to appear on the show. In his first TV audition, he performed "She Was There" from The Scarlet Pimpernel, achieving the highest viewership rating per minute in the first episode of the show. Julian Jootaek Kim, an established opera singer in Europe, performed F. Chopin's "Tristezza." His performance was commented positively by Producer Hye-Soo Sonn, who remarked, "When an opera singer reaches that high a level, the key detail is complete control of the breathing." Phillip Jeong, a part-time member of the Busan Metropolitan Chorus, sang R. Leoncavallo's "Mattinata", with producers noting his clear voice. Tain Han, a student in the Department of Vocal Music at Seoul National University, performed the jazz standard "I've Got The World On A String," though this performance was not aired. Despite his classical training, Han had experience performing in a rock band in Hongdae before joining Phantom Singer 2.

Each member advanced through various stages to reach the final 12. Performances included Han's rendition of Billy Joel's "Piano Man" during a one-on-one duet competition, which was noted for his rhythm, soft phrasing, and stage manner. Kim's duet performance of "A Blooming Day (꽃 피는 날)" lost in a duet competition by two points, but finished in fourth place among the 14 teams. Park's duet with Lee Choong Joo, "As Flowers Bloom and Fall (꽃이 피고 지듯이)," was well-received and ranked first in the duet showdown. Tain Han's trio mission performance of "I See Fire" and Julian Jootaek Kim's trio performance of "Il Guerriero Buono" by Dmitri Hvorostovsky received mixed reviews from the producers. In the semifinal round, the quartet to which Jeong belonged achieved the highest score with their performance of "La Vita."

=== Formation of Miraclass ===
Name	Julian Jootaek Kim	Phillip Jeong	Kang-hyun Park	Tain Han
	Julian Jootaek Kim	Phillip Jeong	Kang-hyun Park	Tain Han
Born	September 9, 1986	August 9, 1989	December 27, 1989	June 16, 1991
Birthplace	Seoul, South Korea	Busan, South Korea	Daegu, South Korea	Seoul, South Korea
Alma mater	Milan Conservatory	Korea National University of Arts	Sungkyunkwan University	Seoul National University
Major	Musica vocale da camera	Vocal Music	Acting Arts	Vocal Music
Voice Type	Baritone	Tenor	Pop Tenor	Bass
Occupations	Opera Singer; Crossover artist; Musical actor	Musician; Crossover artist; Musical actor	Musical actor; Crossover artist; TV drama actor	Singer, songwriter; Crossover artist; Band frontman

The four members encountered various challenges and moments of praise throughout the competition, but ultimately reached the top 12. Among the finalists, Forestella and Edel Reinklang who had sung together since the trio mission, emerged as strong contenders. Forestella, known for their blend of classical and pop music, and Edel Reinklang, with their vocal textures and stage presence, both formed a tight-knit bond during the trio or quartet missions. They already had a team name or a name close to their final form, showcasing their readiness and unity.

When the members of Miraclass first met, only Julian Jootaek Kim and Kang-hyun Park, had previously sung together, while the other two had never sung with the other members. They needed a team name quickly, and Jeong came up with "Miraclass" by combining “miracle” and “class,” indicating their aim to deliver interpretations of classical music. The final competitions were divided into two parts. The first final was held in front of a selected audience who could vote, along with the six producers who could also vote. Each team performed two songs. The first song by Miraclass was Luciano Pavarotti's “Notte,” which placed first place among the three teams, achieving a peak minute rating of 5.5%. After the performances, the combined total points placed Miraclass behind the other two finalist teams.

The second final competition was held at the Peace Hall in Kyung Hee University in front of 3,500 audience members and online voters. Miraclass ended up as the runner-up when votes were tallied. While the group's future was uncertain at the end of the show, as the program primarily supports the winning team, it marked the beginning of Miraclass.

== Post-Phantom Singer 2 (2017-2019) ==
=== Group activity of Miraclass ===
After Phantom Singer 2, all three finalist teams, Forestella, Miraclass, and Edel Reinklang, embarked on the Phantom Singer concert tour starting on December 3, 2017, in Incheon and continuing to Daejeon, Daegu, Gwangju, Ulsan, Seoul, Cheongju, Ilsan, and Busan in South Korea, until February 10, 2018. The concerts were sold out in many cities.

Miraclass held their first concert for fans on April 22, 2018. They recorded a studio album, Romantica, which was on the Hot 100 Korean Album Chart for three weeks, from the 41st to the 43rd weeks in 2018. Romantica includes "Nelle tue mani," "Il Mondo," "On the Way Home (집으로 가는 길)", which is "The Ludlows" by James Horner with Korean lyrics, and their own new song "Now I Know (이젠 알아요)".

Miraclass embarked on their first concert tour, the Romantica Tour, from October 13 to December 28, 2018, performing in four cities at multiple venues in South Korea. The concerts featured rearranged themes from movies and musicals, along with songs from the competition and individual solo performances, all presented with a full orchestra for a diverse musical experience. During the concert tour, fans of Miraclass donated over 1,000 pounds of rice to those in need instead of sending traditional flowers or gifts to the artists.

=== Individual member activities ===
During the period from the end of Phantom Singer 2 in late 2017 to the COVID-19 outbreak in early 2020, the members of Miraclass were engaged in various projects.

Julian Jootaek Kim frequently traveled between Italy for opera performances, and Korea to work as a member of Miraclass. He was the Figaro at Teatro La Fenice in Italy from 2017 to 2019, participating in 34 out of 47 performances of Il barbiere di Siviglia. He missed 13 performances due to his participation in Phantom Singer 2 in South Korea. He appeared in a total of nine opera productions, including La Traviata (as Germont), La bohème (as Marcello), L'elisir d'amore (as Belcore), and Don Carlo (as Rodrigo) across various Italian opera theaters. He also returned to Korea for the album release of Romantica, and the concert tour as a member of Miraclass during this period.

Phillip Jeong and Tain Han formed a duo, Feel in, in 2019, focusing on easy listening music. They released a single and a studio album both titled Feel in. They held concerts, including an in-flight concert to celebrate the new air route between Seoul and Milan for Asiana Airlines, and one charity concert in Hong Kong.

Jeong performed in various concerts such as the Bernstein Memorial Concert in 2017, Opera Carnival in 2018, and the Gala Concert for The Taming of Casanova.

Tain Han also participated in classical crossover performances, including Mozart Opera Concertante - Don Giovanni in 2018, the Gala Concert of The Taming of Casanova, and The 2nd Cheongpung Lakeside Music Festival in 2019. Tain Han also held the True Colours concert at Gurumare Theater in early 2020.

Kang-hyun Park, who was a budding musical actor prior to Phantom Singer 2, became more prominent in the stage musical scene, frequently cast as leading roles in both original Korean and licensed musicals. During the Phantom Singer 2 concert tour, he was involved in musical productions such as Chilseo and Gwanghwamun Love Song. Following the tour, his roles included Kinky Boots (as Charlie Price), The Man Who Laughs (as Gwynplaine), Elizabeth (as Luigi Lucheni), Xcalibur (as Lancelot), Marie Antoinette (as Axel von Fersen the Younger), and a reprise of the role of Gwynplaine in The Man Who Laughs in 2020. He also held his first solo concert, Melody in Blue, in Seoul, Korea, performing a variety of Korean popular songs, pop songs including "City of Stars" from La La Land and "The Scientist" by Coldplay, and musical numbers.

== During COVID-19 (2020-2021) ==
In early 2020, the COVID-19 pandemic severely affected Italy, leading to widespread lockdowns and the cancellation of public events, including opera performances. As a result, Julian Jootaek Kim could not travel to Italy, and all his scheduled operas performances were canceled. Korea also restricted cultural events in enclosed spaces until late June 2020, when restrictions were eased, allowing performances to take place.

During the COVID-19 pandemic, Miraclass and its members remained active in Korea, participating in various cultural events and performances with health protocols in place. As a group, Miraclass held concerts titled A Fairy Tale in Four Colors (사색동화) in October 2020, and January 2021. These concerts featured Korean pop songs from the 1990s and musical numbers, with an emphasis on harmony rather than the orchestral arrangements and powerful vocal delivery. The concerts used arrangements with a band session and a string ensemble of about ten members. Due to COVID-19, the number of performers on stage was limited, and the audience was required to wear masks, with cheering prohibited and clapping allowed for safety reasons.

Individually, the members of Miraclass also pursued various projects. Kang-hyun Park starred in the musical Mozart! and Natasha, Pierre & The Great Comet of 1812. Julian Jootaek Kim performed in several concerts including the 70th Anniversary of the Korean War Commemoration Peace Concert at the Seoul Arts Center Concert Hall, which was held one month later than the commemoration day due to the pandemic. Kim and Phillip Jeong performed in Opera Carnival 2020 and the Encore concerts. Kim also took part in Opera Fashion at the Lotte Concert Hall, and Samuel Yoon's Opera Climax at the Seoul Arts Center Concert Hall in late 2020. Tain Han held two concerts, Over the Beatles and 5959 LIVE focusing on jazz and easy listening music.

== Phantom Singer All Stars (2021) ==
=== Phantom Singer All Stars ===
During the COVID-19 pandemic, when most offline performances were canceled, JTBC aired a twelve-episode special called Phantom Singer All Stars from January to April 2021. This program featured the top three quartets from all three seasons, including Miraclass. Due to COVID-19 restrictions and limited performance opportunities, all 36 members from the nine teams were able to participate. Without a studio audience, the show used a live stream feed of hundreds of online audience members projected on a screen to simulate a live audience.

Unlike previous seasons, this special was not a competition with eliminations. Instead, quartets participated in various missions for a trophy and special prizes. Quartets voted among themselves for the first mission, while subsequent rounds included votes from both a celebrity panel and the online audience. In the final episode of "Phantom Singer Friends," the quartets were reorganized based on song preferences, with the newly formed groups performing selected classical crossover songs from Phantom Singer seasons 1, 2, or 3 with different arrangements.

Formed just before the final stage of Phantom Singer 2, Miraclass performed only four final songs in 2017. Phantom Singer All Stars allowed them to showcase their harmony as a team and enhance their visibility to the general public. They participated in various rounds, including team challenges, solo performances, season battles, genre battles, and the 'Ultimate Auditory Pleasure Contest (귀호강 끝판왕전)'. They performed a variety of songs and secured multiple wins. Performances included a rendition of Josh Groban's "Mai," which earned them the MVP title, and "Cherry Blossom Love Song (벚꽃연가)" with an arrangement by Tain Han that featured the Korean musical instrument Haegeum and a solo by Kang-hyun Park. Julian Jootaek Kim's solo performance of "Perdere l'amore," and Phillip Jeong's performance was also well received. As their final song, Miraclass performed Westlife's "I'll See You Again."

Phantom Singer All Stars gave an opportunity for Miraclass to perform together as a team, highlighting their teamwork while continuing their individual careers.

=== Launch of the YouTube channel Just-10-minute ===
Members of Miraclass engaged with their fans through individual online platforms. However, their appearance on Phillip Jeong's YouTube channel while preparing for Phantom Singer All Stars aired on the first day of 2021 led them to realize the need to start their own channel, Just-10-Minute, in collaboration with producer Mexicomini52. The first season, which started in April 2021, featured an initial episode in which they composed an 8-measure signal song with quartet harmony for the channel in just 10 minutes. Han created the song in 7 minutes, while Kim added harmony with Jeong, and Park participated quietly. They also practiced the harmony with a counter melody within the given time frame. Subsequent episodes of Season 1 included small challenges to be completed in 10 minutes.

=== Phantom Singer All Stars: Gala Concerto Series ===
JTBC held the Phantom Singer All Stars: Gala Concerto Series after the show, adhering to safety COVID-19 protocols in 2021. The series took place at Olympic Hall, Seoul, Korea and featured changing teams over nine events. With social distancing measures in place, society was gradually returning to normal, though it faced sudden threats of closing down. Despite these challenges, the concert events were successfully held.

== Recent activities (2021-) ==
=== Uprising Tour ===
Miraclass embarked on the Uprising Tour between October 2021 and January 2022, performing in various cities. The tour featured performances with the Millennium Symphony Orchestra. The tour not only showcased songs popular among fans but also featured individual performances by each of the four members.

=== RE:BOOT Tour ===
Miraclass released an extended play album RE:BOOT in January 2022, which included the new song, "Miracle." The album also featured "You'll Never Walk Alone," a song selected to provide encouragement during the COVID-19 pandemic. They embarked on the RE:BOOT Tour, performing in four cities from January to March 2022. Due to continuous demand, they held five more concerts, including two online concerts, until December 2022. The RE:BOOT concert tour featured the WE Philharmonic Orchestra and WE Band, showcasing the pop crossover genre.

Miraclass resumed group activities with Miraclass Concert 2024 and has since continued to participate in festivals and hold standalone concerts in 2025.

=== Individual activities of Julian Jootaek Kim ===
Following a fan concert in 2021, Julian Jootaek Kim launched a series of concerts titled Baritone Julian Jootaek Kim's Music Library, featuring opera arias, classical tunes, Italian canzones, musical numbers, and Korean songs.

In 2022, Kim did not undertake major projects such as operas but auditioned for the musical The Phantom of the Opera. He was selected for the role of the Phantom and began preparing for rehearsals. In late December 2022, it was officially announced that Kim was cast as one of the four Phantoms in the Korean replica production of Andrew Lloyd Webber's The Phantom of the Opera.

Julian Jootaek Kim's debut as the Phantom on March 28, 2023, showcased his operatic and high baritone vocal talents, and his transition to musicals was positively received. Critics noted his portrayal of the Phantom's fixation on Christine and his depiction of the Phantom's madness with his powerful vocal presence. Ahead of the Seoul performances, Kim expressed his approach to the role, focusing on his possessive relationship with Christine. His rendition of "The Music of the Night" received positive reviews. Kim's portrayal evolved over the year, with a more nuanced transition from obsession to discovering love. This role earned him the Best New Male Artist Award at The 8th Korea Musical Awards.

Julian Kim portrayed Pierre Bezukhov in the Korean production of the musical Natasha, Pierre & the Great Comet of 1812 from March to June 2024. His performance highlighted his vocal abilities and nuanced acting, bringing Pierre to life. Julian Kim is set to portray Emperor Gojong in the 30th anniversary production of the original Korean musical The Last Empress from December 2024 to March 2025.

=== Individual activities of Phillip Jeong ===
Jeong, alongside his Miraclass teammate Baritone Julian Jootaek Kim and the BeHa Philharmonic Orchestra, participated in a program that toured nine cities in 2022 and 2023. They performed a diverse repertoire that included opera arias, Korean lyrical songs, Spanish and Italian songs, and musical numbers.

Phillip Jeong's first solo recital, held in June 2023, featured a varied setlist that included classical opera pieces, Italian art songs, and contemporary pieces. In a statement, Jeong remarked, "I aimed to deliver vivid emotions to the audience using just the piano and my vocal strength without any amplification. I look forward to presenting even larger and more refined performances for my fans in the future." He continues to dedicate himself to his vocal studies.

In November 2023, he released the album Esòrdio, and held his second solo recital. The concert featured a diverse program that blended classical arias, art songs, and contemporary pieces. He has performed in Hong Kong in 2024 and is scheduled to appear at the HKGNA Music Festival alongside Sumi Jo and Warren Lee (2025).

Jeong performed in the premiere of the original musical Buchihanan, playing the antagonist roles of Hamoon in the present and Mandarantu in the past in 2024.

=== Individual activities of Kang-hyun Park ===
Kang-hyun Park was busy performing in musicals while on the RE:BOOT tour. He played Orpheus in Hadestown from September 2021 to February 2022, earning the Best Actor award at the 6th Korea Musical Awards and Star of the Year at the 16th DIMF Awards. In 2022, he returned to The Man Who Laughs at the Sejong Center and played Tony in West Side Story during the 2022/2023 season, and played Huey in Memphis in 2023. Park starred as Evan Hansen in Dear Evan Hansen from March to July 2024 and reprised his role as Orpheus in Hadestown from July to October 2024. He was nominated for Best Actor for his role in Memphis at the 8th Korea Musical Awards in 2024. Park played Aladdin in the first Korean replica production of the musical Aladdin, starting in November 2024, and will appear as Pi in musical Life of Pi in December 2025.

Since his debut in 2015, Park has performed in multiple productions annually, earning the Best New Actor award in 2017 and the Best Actor award in 2022. By 2024, he is a prominent figure in South Korean musical theater. Six years after competing in Phantom Singer 2, he returned as a producer for Phantom Singer 4, providing feedback to contestants based on his experience as a past participant.

Park has received acclaim for his "overwhelming vocal ability and clear enunciation," and "solid and unwavering vocal strength," especially in high notes. Shin Youngsook praised his skills, predicting his rise as a major star. Known for his character interpretations, Park portrayed a "confident yet immature" Huey in Memphis and a "fragile and anxious" Evan in Dear Evan Hansen, showcasing control over his vocal range and effective character transformations.

Park starred as Sin Do-Sik in the 2023 KBS2 TV drama Heartbeat and sang for its original soundtrack, "Vampire." Park released a project single MAGIC with M SOUND CLOUD Project, produced by Pdogg, the main producer of BTS.

=== Individual activities of Tain Han ===
From the beginning of his appearance in Phantom Singer 2, Tain Han's interests in various music genres was seen. He has a deep and strong bass voice when he sings as a member of Miraclass. During Phantom Singer All Stars, Hye-Soo Sonn remarked that Han's voice sounded like an electric contrabass when performing "Love Runs Out" by OneRepublic. Han has been active in the indie scene since college, with his prominence growing in 2021. In the A Travel with the Six-Strings Concert (六絃紀行), with jazz guitarist Younwoo Park, he curated the show and performed his own song "A Dog's Life," as well as "Knocking on Heaven's Door," "Padam Padam," "Can't Take My Eyes Off of You," and other jazzy and easy-listening songs.

Tain Han formed the melodic pop band TAIN with guitarist and producer Kim Jin-ho, focusing on adult-oriented rock with gentle melodies and relatable lyrics. Before forming the band, Tain Han performed solo under the name TAIN. The band's music integrates adult-oriented rock influences, to produce melodic pop songs. On July 26, 2022, TAIN released their first full-length album, SPORTS, blending nostalgic '90s and '00s sounds with a modern twist.

Along with Kim Jin-ho and Choi Sun-yong, Tain Han formed the three-member animation rock band KACHISAN, named after Kachisan subway station in Seoul, South Korea. The band aims to deliver music influenced by new millennium cartoon theme songs and pop-punk rock genres. KACHISAN released their debut single Theme of Love in February 2023, followed by their first full-length album Hello, This is KACHISAN in March 2023. Tain Han sings and plays Richenbacker Jetglo and Stratocaster guitars for KACHISAN in indie scene in South Korea. Han had a concert Hee Jak Hak Won (희작학원: 喜鹊學院) in 2024, and has an upcoming concert Evil and I in 2025.

== Media appearances ==
Miraclass frequently appears on Open Concert, and Immortal Songs: Singing the Legend on KBS. They have also been featured on SungYol's Global Music Trip on EBS, Choi Hwajung's Power Time on SBS, and Duetto's The Classic on YTN Radio. Additionally, on the official JTBC YouTube channel, JTBCPLUS, Shin Yeri, director of the News Production Department at JTBC, conducted a three-hour interview with Miraclass.

== YouTube channel: Just-10-minute ==
In April 2021, the members of Miraclass launched a YouTube channel titled Just-10-minute. Collaborating with Mexicomini52, the channel features the group participating in various challenges and activities limited to 10 minutes. The project aims to engage with fans by providing regular content that showcases the members' versatility.

=== Content and themes ===
The channel's content includes mini-games, skits, and situational dramas, creating its own fictional universe. Episodes feature an audition for new Miraclass members and the "Mikle Company" series, where members play employees of a fictional company. In Season 3, the channel adopted a high school theme, with members portraying students who learn different lessons each episode. The flexible school environment facilitates both indoor and outdoor activities.

=== Additional activities ===
The channel also includes episodes where the members go camping, engage in athletic mini-games, travel to watch the sunrise, participate in an escape game, form the rock band 'Love in the Power,' and host a show for guests. These activities include various performances by the members and highlight their collaborative efforts and team dynamics.

=== Audience engagement ===
The channel streams live shows, incorporating responses from viewers and answering questions. Occasionally, the members sing parts of requested songs, fostering audience engagement. As of August 2024, the channel is in its fifth season, demonstrating the team's continued collaboration even while working on separate projects, showcasing Miraclass's 'separately together' dynamic.

== List of performances (group and individual) ==
Miraclass is a group where members are also individually active in various fields, including opera, musicals, concerts, and television dramas. The activities of each member are summarized in the table below. As a group, Miraclass primarily engages in concerts, concert tours, and television appearances, particularly on Phantom Singer. Additionally, the group's continuity and cohesion are showcased through their YouTube channel, Just-10-minute.

Month	Julian Jootaek Kim	Phillip Jeong	Kang-hyun Park		Tain Han	Miraclass	
Month	Julian Jootaek Kim	Phillip Jeong	Kang-hyun Park		Tain Han	Concerts	YouTube
2017
9	Formation of Miraclass						
10	Phantom Singer 2 (TV show)						
11			Chilseo				
12			Gwanghwamun Love Song			Phantom Singer 2 Concert Tour	
2018
1			Gwanghwamun Love Song			Phantom Singer 2 Concert Tour	
2			Kinky Boots				
3	La bohème		Kinky Boots				
4	I puritani					Miraclass First Fan Concert	
5	La traviata	Feel in Concert			Feel in Concert		
6							
7			The Man Who Laughs				
8	Il barbiere di Siviglia		The Man Who Laughs				
9	Il barbiere di Siviglia		The Man Who Laughs				
10	Il barbiere di Siviglia		The Man Who Laughs				
11	L'elisir d'amore		Elisabeth				
12			Elisabeth			Romantica Tour	
2019
1			Elisabeth			Romantica Tour	
2			Elisabeth				
3	Il barbiere di Siviglia						
4							
5							
6	Italiana		Xcalibur				
7			Xcalibur				
8	Il barbiere di Siviglia		Marie Antoinette				
9	Il barbiere di Siviglia		Marie Antoinette				
10	Il barbiere di Siviglia		Marie Antoinette				
11	Don Carlo		MElody in blue				
12	Don Carlo	Jack the Ripper				Phantom of Classic Concert Tour	
2020
1		Jack the Ripper	The Man Who Laughs				
2	L'elisir d'amore	Jack the Ripper	The Man Who Laughs		True Colours		
3							
4							
5							
6			Mozart!				
7			Mozart!				
8			Mozart!				
9							
10						A Fairy Tale in Four Colors	
11					5959		
12							
2021
1						A Fairy Tale in Four Colors	
2						Phantom Singer All Stars (TV show)	
3			Natasha, Pierre & The Great Comet of 1812			Phantom Singer All Stars (TV show)	
4			Natasha, Pierre & The Great Comet of 1812			Phantom Singer All Stars (TV show)	Just-10-minute Season 1
5			Natasha, Pierre & The Great Comet of 1812			Phantom Singer All Stars: Gala Concerto Series	Just-10-minute Season 1
6						Phantom Singer All Stars: Gala Concerto Series	Just-10-minute Season 1
7							Just-10-minute Season 1
8							Just-10-minute Season 1
9			Hadestown		A Travel with the Six-Strings Concert (六絃紀行)		
10			Hadestown			UPRISING Tour	Just-10-minute Season 2
11	Music Library		Hadestown				Just-10-minute Season 2
12			Hadestown				Just-10-minute Season 2
2022
1			Hadestown			RE:BOOT Tour	
2			Hadestown			RE:BOOT Tour	
3						RE:BOOT Tour	
4						RE:BOOT Tour	Just-10-minute Season 3
5	Music Library					RE:BOOT Tour	Just-10-minute Season 3
6			The Man Who Laughs			RE:BOOT Tour	Just-10-minute Season 3
7	Music Library		The Man Who Laughs		SPORTS	RE:BOOT Tour	Just-10-minute Season 3
8			The Man Who Laughs			RE:BOOT Tour	Just-10-minute Season 3
9						RE:BOOT Tour	
10						RE:BOOT Tour	
11			West Side Story			RE:BOOT Tour	
12			West Side Story			RE:BOOT Tour	
2023
1			West Side Story				
2			West Side Story				
3	The Phantom of the Opera, Busan						
4	The Phantom of the Opera, Busan						
5	The Phantom of the Opera, Busan						Just-10-minute Season 4
6	The Phantom of the Opera, Busan	Solo Recital		Heartbeat			Just-10-minute Season 4
7	The Phantom of the Opera, Seoul		Memphis	Heartbeat			Just-10-minute Season 4
8	The Phantom of the Opera, Seoul		Memphis	Heartbeat			Just-10-minute Season 4
9	The Phantom of the Opera, Seoul		Memphis				Just-10-minute Season 4
10	The Phantom of the Opera, Seoul		Memphis		Kachisan Solo Concert		Just-10-minute Season 4
11	The Phantom of the Opera, Seoul	Solo Recital					Just-10-minute Season 4
12	Music Library				Kachi Kachi year-end Solo Performance		Just-10-minute Season 4
2024
1	The Phantom of the Opera, Daegu						Just-10-minute Season 4
2	The Phantom of the Opera, Daegu						Just-10-minute Season 4
3	Natasha, Pierre & The Great Comet of 1812		Dear Evan Hansen				Just-10-minute Season 5
4	Natasha, Pierre & The Great Comet of 1812		Dear Evan Hansen				Just-10-minute Season 5
5	Natasha, Pierre & The Great Comet of 1812		Dear Evan Hansen				Just-10-minute Season 5
6	Natasha, Pierre & The Great Comet of 1812		Dear Evan Hansen				Just-10-minute Season 5
7			Hadestown				Just-10-minute Season 5
8			Hadestown				Just-10-minute Season 5
9		Buchihanan	Hadestown		Hee Jak Hak Won (희작학원: 喜鹊學院)		Just-10-minute Season 5
10		Buchihanan	Hadestown				Just-10-minute Season 5
11		Buchihanan	Aladdin				Just-10-minute Season 5
12	The Last Empress		Aladdin		Kachi Kachi Year-End	Miraclass Concert 2024	Just-10-minute Season 5
2025
1	The Last Empress		Aladdin				Just-10-minute Season 5
2	The Last Empress		Aladdin			Miraclass Concert Encore	Just-10-minute Season 5
3	The Last Empress		Aladdin		Nodeul Edition - Kachisan		Just-10-minute Season 5
4	The Last Empress		Aladdin			The Fan Drama OST Concert with Miraclass	Just-10-minute Season 5
5	The Last Empress		Aladdin		PEAK FESTIVAL 2025		Just-10-minute Season 5
6	The Last Empress		Aladdin	Memphis	Beautiful Mint Life 2025		Just-10-minute Season 5
7	The Last Empress		Aladdin	Memphis			
8			Aladdin	Memphis			
9	Music Library		Aladdin	Memphis			
10					Evil and I	Live Life Like Crossover Conert, Miraclass Inside	
11		HKGNA Music Festival 2025					
12			Life of Pi				
2026
1	Arang		Life of Pi				
2	Arang		Life of Pi				Just-10-minute Season 6
3							Just-10-minute Season 6
4	Arang				2026 Green Camp Festival		
5	Arang				Beautiful Mint Life 2026	Miraclass Concert 2026_GLORY	
Color code	Opera	Musical	TV drama		Concert	Concert tour	YouTube

== Discography ==
Miraclass has an extensive discography as a group, including the studio album Romantica, the extended play RE:BOOT, and the singles "Miracle" and "My Hero."' Their work is also featured in the compilation albums of Phantom Singer. Detailed information about these releases can be found in the table below.

=== Album ===
Title	Details	Peak chart position	Sales
Title	Details	KOR	Sales
Romantica	Released: October 10, 2018; Label: Arts & Artists, Universal Music; Formats: CD, digital download; Track listing; 1. La Tua Semplicità; 2. Notte; 3. 집으로 가는 길 TITLE; 4. Nelle Tue Mani; 5. La Libertà; 6. Feelings; 7. Look Inside; 8. I Dreamed A Dream; 9. 이젠 알아요; 10. Il Canto; 11. Il Mondo; 12. Just Show Me How To Love You	17	

=== EP ===
Title	Details
RE:BOOT	Release date: January 5, 2022; Label: Library Company, Danal Entertainment; Formats: digital download; Track listing; 1. Miracle TITLE; 2. You′ll Never Walk Alone 3. Miracle (Inst.) 4. You′ll Never Walk Alone (Inst.)
Aria	Release date: April 27, 2026; Label: Library Company; Formats: CD, digital download; Track listing; 1. You Raise Me Up; 2. Aria; 3. A Million Dreams; 4. I Don’t Want To Miss A Thing; 5. Hallelujah

=== Singles ===
Title	Year	Details
"My hero"	2022	Danal Entertainment; Formats: digital download

=== Compilation Albums ===
Title	Year	Details
"Notte"	2017	Phantom Singer 2
"Forsaken"	2017	Phantom Singer 2
"Who Wants To Live Forever"	2017	Phantom Singer 2
"Feelings"	2017	Phantom Singer 2
"Always You (늘 그대)"	2021	Phantom Singer All Stars
"Cherry Blossom Love Song (벚꽃연가)"	2021	Phantom Singer All Stars
"Decalcomanie"	2021	Phantom Singer All Stars
"I'll see you again"	2021	Phantom Singer All Stars
