= Kang-hyun Park =

South Korean musical theatre actor and singer

- 박강현
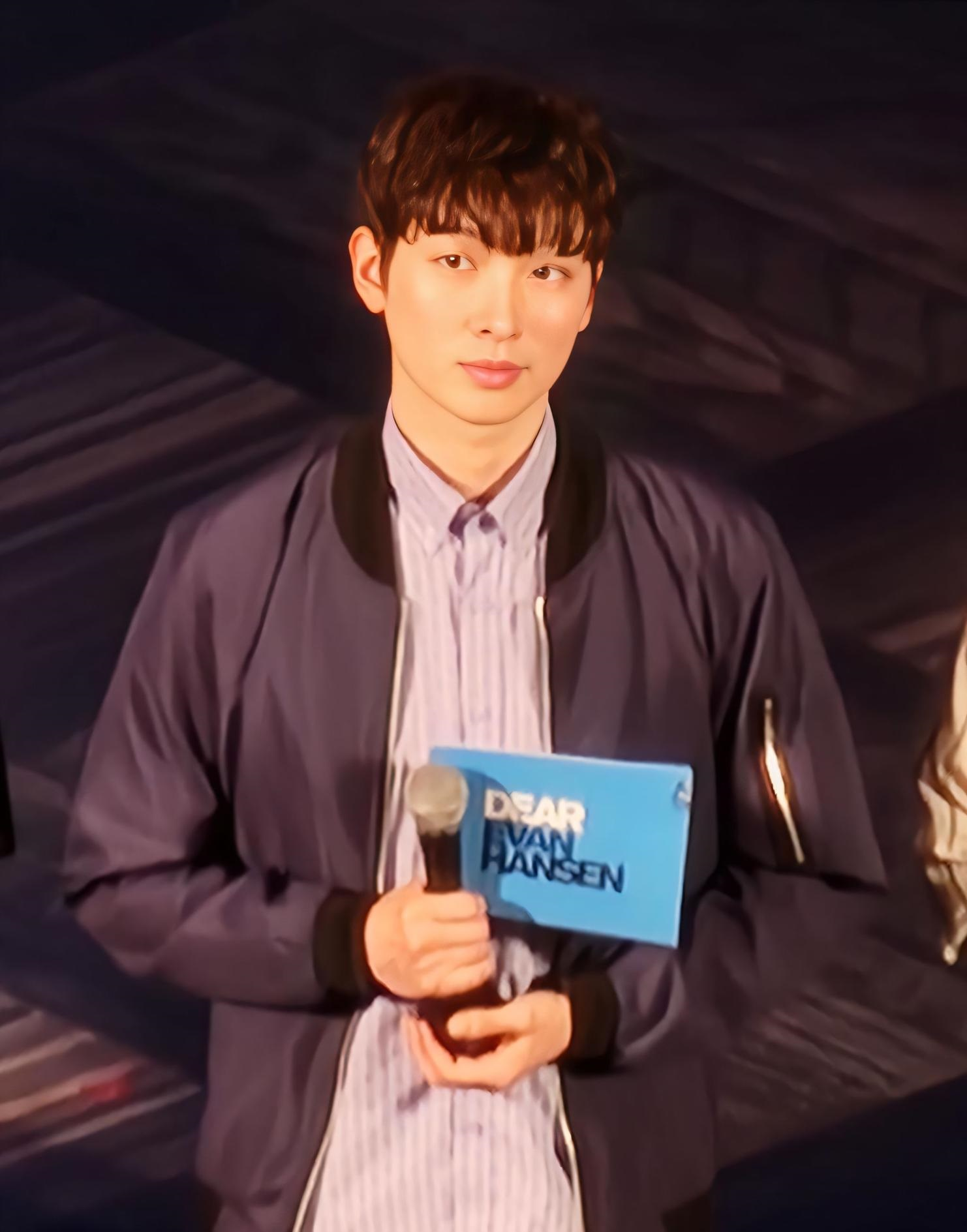
- Park during the final bow speech of Dear Evan Hansen, June 2024, Seoul, Korea
- Born: December 27, 1989 (age 36)
- Education: Sungkyunkwan University
- Occupations: Musical actor; singer; crossover artist; Tv actor
- Website: parkkanghyun.bstage.in

Kang-hyun Park (Korean: 박강현) is a South Korean musical theater actor, singer, crossover artist and TV actor. He debuted in 2015 with the Korean original musical Liar Time, and has since played leading roles in various musicals in South Korea. He gained prominence by appearing on the JTBC audition program Phantom Singer Season 2 in 2017, where he reached the finals, and was part of the runner-up team Miraclass. Park made his TV drama debut in 2023 with Heartbeat on KBS2, and released the single album Magic.

== Biography ==
Kang-hyun Park, born on December 27, 1989, with a recognized birth date of February 27, 1990, attended Deokwon High School. He later graduated from Sungkyunkwan University with a Bachelor of Arts degree.

== Musical theater career ==
=== Early career and recognition ===
Park made his debut in 2015 as the lead in the original Korean musical Liar Time. In the subsequent production of Bare: The Musical, he was cast due to his "captivating voice that impressed the creative team." Despite being a rookie, he was featured in an in-depth interview during the performance period. Since his debut, he has been actively performing in both Daehangno and major theaters in South Korea. Park played Benny in In the Heights, Ash in Evil Dead, and King Gwanghae in Chilseo (Korean: 칠서) in 2017, which led to his Best New Male Artist award at the 2017 Stagetalk Audience Choice Awards (SACA) in South Korea.

=== Phantom Singer, subsequent work and awards ===
After his initial recognition, Park continued to expand his repertoire in both original Korean and replica musical productions, receiving several prestigious awards. In 2017, he performed as a young Myung Woo in Gwanghwamun Love Song (Korean: 광화문 연가), an original Korean musical. He also joined Phantom Singer 2, a South Korean audition program aired on JTBC, aimed at forming a male crossover vocal quartet. Park sang "She Was There" from the musical The Scarlet Pimpernel as his first audition song, achieving the highest viewership rating per minute during this performance. His duet with Lee Choong Joo, "As Flowers Bloom and Fall (Korean: 꽃이 피고 지듯이)," ranked first in the entire duet competition. Although he struggled in the trio and quartet team missions, he made it to the finals as one of the top 12 contestants. In the finals, based on his wishes and the team arrangement by the producers, he formed a quartet with Julian Jootaek Kim, Phillip Jeong, and Tain Han named Miraclass. Miraclass finished as the runner-up among the three final teams. They released their debut album Romantica in 2018.

In 2018, Park played Charlie in Kinky Boots. His role as Gwynplaine in The Man Who Laughs (Korean: 웃는 남자), a Korean musical adaptation of Victor Hugo's novel, was noteworthy, with performances throughout 2018. This performance earned him the 7th Yegreen Musical Awards for Best New Actor. In 2019, he portrayed Luigi Lucheni in Elisabeth, which earned him the 13th DIMF Awards for Newcomer of the Year. Additionally, his roles in Xcalibur (as Lancelot) and Marie Antoinette earned him the SACA Best Musical Actor award for Best Male Supporting Actor. He was awarded the 4th Korea Musical Awards for Best Supporting Actor for his performance in Xcalibur.

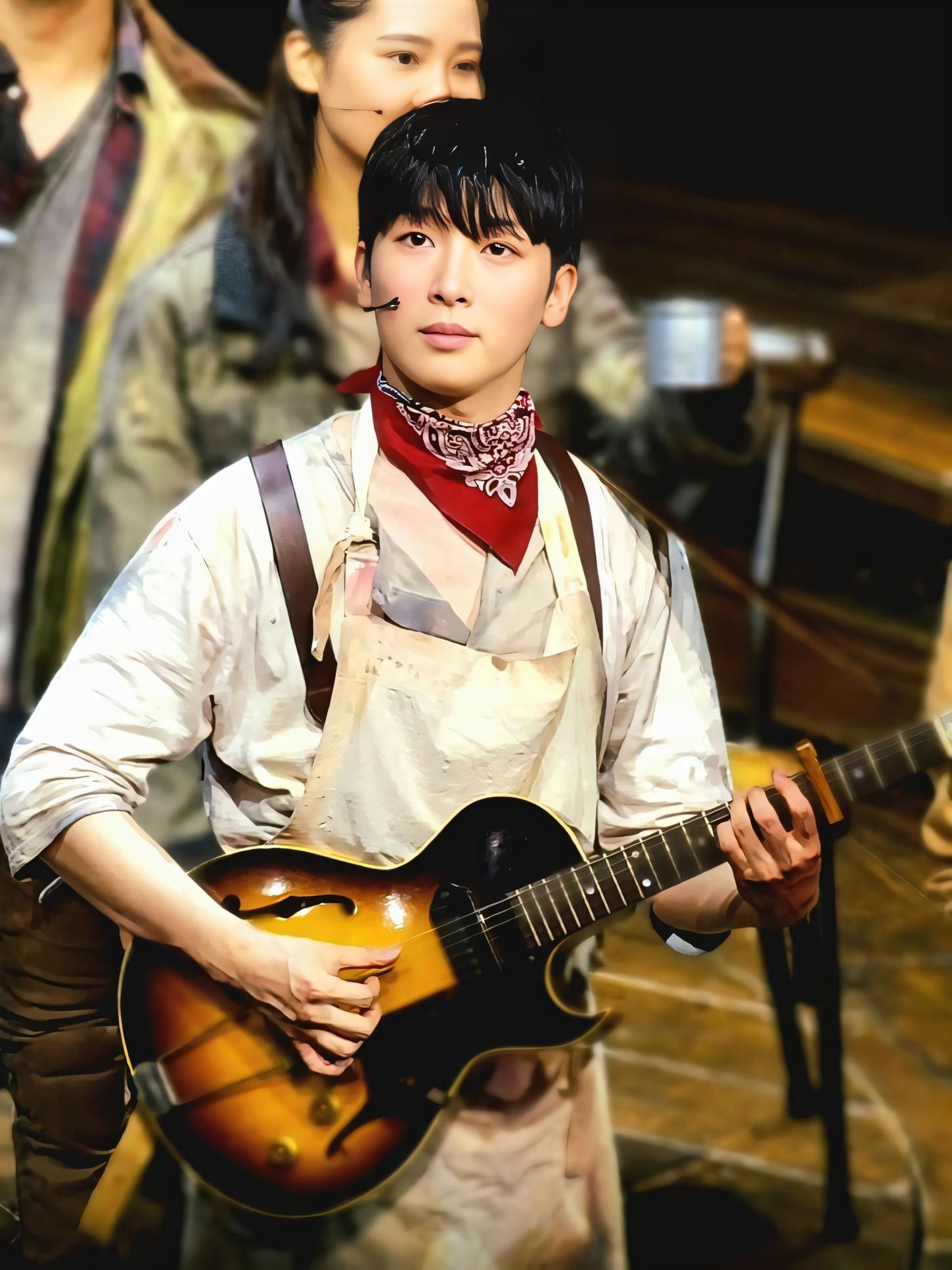
Park during the curtain call of Hadestown, July 2024, Seoul, Korea

In 2020, he returned as Gwynplaine in The Man Who Laughs. The 10th anniversary performance of Mozart! in South Korea, where he played the protagonist Wolfgang Mozart, was held at the main auditorium of the Sejong Center, and also aired online due to the special circumstances of the COVID-19 period. In 2021, he performed as Anatole Kuragin in Korean replica production of Natasha, Pierre & The Great Comet of 1812 and returned to Phantom Singer All Stars with Miraclass.

Park played Orpheus in Hadestown from September 2021 to February 2022. This role earned him the 6th Korea Musical Awards for Best Actor, and the 16th DIMF Awards for Star of the Year. In 2022, he returned to the role of Gwynplaine in The Man Who Laughs at the Sejong Center. His role as Tony in West Side Story in the 2022/2023 season, was followed by his portrayal of Huey in Memphis in 2023.

Six years after competing as a contestant in Phantom Singer 2, Park returned as a producer for Phantom Singer 4. In Phantom Singer, producers assist contestants with team formation, song selection, and determining outcomes. Depending on the season, producers include experts in vocal music, popular music, instrumental music, composition, lyrics, and performing arts. Park was the first producer who previously participated as a contestant. He provided practical and valuable feedback on contestants' psychological states, microphone techniques, and team harmony.

Park starred as Evan Hansen in Dear Evan Hansen from March to July 2024, and played Orpheus in Hadestown at the Charlotte Theater from July to October, 2024. He was nominated for Best Actor for Memphis at the 8th Korea Musical Awards in 2024. Park played the protagonist, Aladdin, in the Korean replica premiere of the musical Aladdin.

== Artistry ==
Park has received acclaim for his "overwhelming vocal ability and clear enunciation" and "solid and unwavering vocal strength." His high notes are particularly noted for their comfort and steadiness. His nickname "the Simmons," inspired by the Simmons Bedding Company's slogan "unwavering comfort" used in the Korean market, highlights his ability to perform challenging musical numbers with ease, especially in higher registers. Park is regarded as a promising talent in the Korean musical theater scene, recognized for his wide vocal range and versatility, including operatic tones. Shin Youngsook praised his vocal skills, stating, "I love Kang-hyun Park's voice. He is destined to become a big star, and I am a fan watching him grow. His voice is characterized by comfort, clarity, and energy, which are his greatest strengths."

Park has also been recognized for his "excellent character interpretation," "displaying inner purity" and "an ability to convey the innocence of his characters in a beautiful way, becoming the character itself." In his role as Huey in Memphis, he depicted a "confident yet somewhat immature young man, showcasing a charming character with wit and vivacity." In Dear Evan Hansen, he received commendation for portraying a "fragile and anxious" character, "demonstrating perfect control over both chest and head voice, and effectively transforming into Evan Hansen with a nervous gaze and a hunched posture."

Since his debut in 2015, Park has consistently performed in one to four musical productions annually. He has achieved substantial growth, earning the Best New Actor award in 2017 and the Best Actor award in 2022. By 2024, he is recognized as a prominent and influential figure in the musical theater industry in South Korea, with strong ticket-selling power.

== Stage ==
=== Musicals ===
Start Date	End date	Title	Role	Venue
2015.10.23	2015.11.15	Liar Time (Korean: 라이어 타임)	Dante	YES24 Art One Theater 2
2016.06.29	2016.09.04	Bare: The Musical	Peter	Doosan Art Center Yonkang Hall
2016.12.20	2017.02.12	In The Heights	Benny	Seoul Arts Center CJ Towol Theater
2017.06.24	2017.09.17	Evil Dead The Musical	Ash	Uniplex Hall 1
2017.11.10	2017.11.17	Chilseo (Korean: 칠서)	King Gwanghae (Korean: 광해)	Chungmu Art Center Grand Theater
2017.12.15	2018.01.14	Gwanghwamun Love Song (Korean: 광화문 연가)	Young Age Myung Woo (Korean: 젊은 명우)	Sejong Center Main Auditorium
2018.01.31	2018.04.01	Kinky Boots	Charlie Price	Blue Square
2018.07.08	2018.08.26	The Man Who Laughs (Korean: 웃는 남자)	Gwynplaine	Seoul Arts Center Opera Theater
2018.09.05	2018.11.04	The Man Who Laughs (Korean: 웃는 남자)	Gwynplaine	Blue Square
2018.11.17	2019.02.10	Elisabeth	Luigi Lucheni	Blue Square
2019.06.15	2019.08.04	Xcalibur	Lancelot	Sejong Center Main Auditorium
2019.08.24	2019.11.17	Marie Antoinette	Axel von Fersen the Younger	D-Cube Link Art Center
2020.01.09	2020.03.01	The Man Who Laughs (Korean: 웃는 남자)	Gwynplaine	Seoul Arts Center Opera Theater
2020.06.16	2020.08.20	Mozart!	Wolfgang Mozart	Sejong Center Main Auditorium
2021.03.20	2021.05.30	Natasha, Pierre & The Great Comet of 1812	Anatole Kuragin	Universal Art Center
2021.09.07	2022.02.27	Hadestown	Orpheus	LG Art Center
2022.06.10	2022.08.22	The Man Who Laughs (Korean: 웃는 남자)	Gwynplaine	Sejong Center Main Auditorium
2022.11.17	2023.02.26	West Side Story	Tony	Chungmu Art Center Grand Theater
2023.07.20	2023.10.22	Memphis	Huey Calhoun	Chungmu Art Center Grand Theater
2024.03.28	2024.06.23	Dear Evan Hansen	Evan Hansen	Chungmu Art Center Grand Theater
2024.07.04	2024.07.21	Dear Evan Hansen	Evan Hansen	Dream Theater, Busan
2024.07.12	2024.10.06	Hadestown	Orpheus	Charlotte Theater
2024.11.22	2025.06.22	Aladdin	Aladdin	Charlotte Theater
2025.07.11	2025.09.28	Aladdin	Aladdin	Dream Theater, Busan
2025.06.17	2025.09.21	Memphis	Huey Calhoun	Chungmu Art Center Grand Theater
2026.08.01	2026.11.01	Dear Evan Hansen	Evan Hansen	Chungmu Art Center Grand Theater

=== Plays ===
In the early stages of his career, Kang-hyun Park appeared in the play Our Bad Magnet, which is based on the book by Douglas Maxwell.

Start	End	Title	Role	Venue
2017.03.05	2017.05.28	Our Bad Magnet	Fraser	Daehangno Art One Theater 1
2025.12.02	2026.03.02	Life of Pi	Pi	GS Arts Center

== Filmography ==
=== Film ===
Park appeared in a film when he was an undergraduate student at Sungkyunkwan University. He was also in another film, a director's cut of the live musical performance of The Man Who Laughs in 2019.

Year	Title	Original Korean Title	Role	Notes
2014	Love Motel Brutality	러브모텔 잔혹사	Bu Sanghae	The 9th Fried Screen Festival in the Department of Film, Television, and Multimedia at Sungkyunkwan University
2019	The Man Who Laughs	웃는 남자	Gwynplaine	Musical, live performance, director's cut

=== Television ===
Year	TV network	Title	Role	Notes
2017	JTBC	Phantom Singer 2	Participant	Entire show, 13 episodes
2018	MBC every1	Videostar	Himself	Episode 88
2019	KBS 2TV	Entertainment Weekly	Himself	Episode 1766
2019	KBS 2TV	Open Concert	Performer	Episode 1262
2020	KBS 2TV	Open Concert	Performer	Episode 1288
2020	TV Chosun	Star Documentary My Way	Himself	Episode 202
2021	JTBC	Phantom Singer All Stars	Himself	Entire show, as Miraclass, 12 episodes
2021	KBS 2TV	Boss in the Mirror	Himself	Episodes 104-106
2023	JTBC	Phantom Singer 4	Producer, Judge	Entire show, 13 episodes
2023	KBS 2TV	Heartbeat	Shin Do-Sik	Main role, 16 Episodes, also sang an original soundtrack
2023	SBS	SBS Nightline	Himself	

== Concerts ==
Park performs in concerts with fellow musical actors, singing musical numbers. He also performs crossover music, which encompasses musical numbers, Italian canzones, Korean lyrical songs, opera arias, pop, and rock music, both as a member of Miraclass, and with other artists. In 2019, he held his own solo concert titled "MElody in Blue."

The following is a curated selection of his concerts.

Year	Title	Venue	Notes
2018	Jeongseojin picnic classic	Incheon Cheongna Lake Park	With Donghyun Kim, Se-Kwon Ahn and Bae Doo-hoon
2019	The Man Who Laughs concert	Seinenkan Hall, Tokyo, Japan	Concert celebrating the successful export of the musical 'The man who laughs' to Japan
2019	MElody in blue	Blue Square iMarket Hall	First solo concert
2020	Staged concert vol 2 Musical, Jesus Christ Superstar	LG Art Center	As Judas
2020	제14회 DIMF opening concert [DIMF ON-TACT]	Daegu Opera House	online concert
2020	2020 Supershow	Incheon Jung-gu Cultural Center	With Lee Choong Joo and Shin Youngsook
2021	Hollywood in classic concert	Lotte Concert Hall	With WE Philharmonic Orchestra
2021	2021 Someday theatre cantabile #2	Lotte Concert Hall	With Cho Hyung Kyun and Taejin Son
2021	Ennio Morricone film music concert	Lotte Concert Hall	With WE Philharmonic Orchestra
2021	Cho Kang Tae concert	Blue Square Mastercard Hall	With Cho Hyung Kyun and Taejin Son
2021	Hollywood in Christmas	Lotte Concert Hall	With WE Philharmonic Orchestra
2021	Hollywood film music concert in Busan	Dream Theater	With Julian Jootaek Kim and WE Philharmonic Orchestra
2022	Hollywood film music concert in Busan	Dream Theater	With Julian Jootaek Kim and WE Philharmonic Orchestra
2024	'The March' Gala Concert	Lotte Concert Hall	"The March" Foundation Commemoration
2024	IN:JOY DAY	Woonjung Green Campus Auditorium, Sungshin Women's University	
2025	MELODY IN BLUE ep.2	Sejong University, Daeyang Hall	Solo Concert

== Discography ==
Park has compilation albums of live performances from musicals, and the TV program Phantom Singer 2. His singles include the original soundtrack of his TV drama Heartbeat, and a project album by M SOUND CLOUD Project with producers including Pdogg. Due to his prolific musical work, Park has numerous music videos featuring key musical numbers from the stage musicals in which he has performed.

=== Compilation albums ===
Title	Year	Details
"A Little Seed (Korean: 작은씨앗)"	2017	Our Bad Magnet Original Soundtrack: Planning: Alligator Company; Release: Sound Pub; Artists: Kang Jeong-woo, Moon Tae-yu, Park Kang-hyun, Park Eun-seok, Bae Doo-hoon, Son Yoo-dong, Song Kwang-il, Ahn Jae-young, Oh Seung-hoon, Woo Chan, Lee Chang-yeop, Choi Yong-sik
"Tulip (Korean: 튤립)"	2017	Our Bad Magnet Original Soundtrack: Planning: Alligator Company; Release: Sound Pub; Artists: Kang Jeong-woo, Moon Tae-yu, Park Kang-hyun, Park Eun-seok, Bae Doo-hoon, Son Yoo-dong, Song Kwang-il, Ahn Jae-young, Oh Seung-hoon, Woo Chan, Lee Chang-yeop, Choi Yong-sik
"The Tempest (Korean: 태풍)"	2019	Musical Xcalibur World Premiere Live Recording Original Cast 2019: Universal Music; EMK Musical Company; artists: Kai, Kim Junsu, Dokyeom, Um Ki-joon, Lee Ji-hoon, Kang-hyun Park, Shin Youngsook, Jang Eun Ah, Kim Jun Hyun, Son Jun-ho, Kim So-hyang, Min Kyung-ah
"This is How It Ends (Korean: 이게 바로 끝)"	2019	Musical Xcalibur World Premiere Live Recording Original Cast 2019: Universal Music; EMK Musical Company; artists: Kai, Kim Junsu, Dokyeom, Um Ki-joon, Lee Ji-hoon, Kang-hyun Park, Shin Youngsook, Jang Eun Ah, Kim Jun Hyun, Son Jun-ho, Kim So-hyang, Min Kyung-ah
"How Deep The Silence (Korean: 더 깊은 침묵)"	2019	Musical Xcalibur World Premiere Live Recording Original Cast 2019: Universal Music; EMK Musical Company; artists: Kai, Kim Junsu, Dokyeom, Um Ki-joon, Lee Ji-hoon, Kang-hyun Park, Shin Youngsook, Jang Eun Ah, Kim Jun Hyun, Son Jun-ho, Kim So-hyang, Min Kyung-ah
"Never To Love (Korean: 없는 사랑)"	2019	Musical Xcalibur World Premiere Live Recording Original Cast 2019: Universal Music; EMK Musical Company; artists: Kai, Kim Junsu, Dokyeom, Um Ki-joon, Lee Ji-hoon, Kang-hyun Park, Shin Youngsook, Jang Eun Ah, Kim Jun Hyun, Son Jun-ho, Kim So-hyang, Min Kyung-ah
"I Am Music (Korean: 나는 나는 음악)"	2020	Musical 'Mozart!' 10th Anniversary Concert Repackage Album: Planning: EMK Musical Company; Artists: Kim Junsu, Park Kang-hyun, Kim So-hyang, Kim Yeon-ji, Min Young Ki, Son Jun-ho, Shin Youngsook, Kim So-hyun
"I Want To Avoid My Destiny (Korean: 내 운명 피하고 싶어)"	2020	Musical 'Mozart!' 10th Anniversary Concert Repackage Album: Planning: EMK Musical Company; Artists: Kim Junsu, Park Kang-hyun, Kim So-hyang, Kim Yeon-ji, Min Young Ki, Son Jun-ho, Shin Youngsook, Kim So-hyun
"Because We Believe"	2021	Phantom Singer All Stars, Episode 7: JTBC (TV program); Artists: Donghyun Kim, Se-Kwon Ahn, Kang-hyun Park, Phillip Jeong

=== Singles ===
Title	Year	Details
Vampire	2023	Heartbeat (Original Television Soundtrack): KBS 2TV, TV drama
MAGIC	2023	Music Collaboration-MAGIC: M SOUND CLOUD Project; Composed and Lyrics by Pdogg / ReRe / BLVSH / Chris James

=== Music videos ===
Song title	Year	Channel	Notes
"Best kept secret"	2016	ShowPLAY	2016 Bare the musical (Peter 'Kang-hyun Park', Jason 'Kyungsu Seo')
"See me"	2016	ShowPLAY	2016 Bare the musical (Peter 'Kang-hyun Park', Jason 'Kyungsu Seo')
"Angel on the tree"	2018	EMK MUSICAL	[Musical The man who laughs] Kang-hyun Park, Min KyoungAh
"Soul of a man"	2020	SeeMiu by CJ ENM	[Kinky Boots] Park Kang-hyun's High Note Explosion as Charlie
"She was there"	2020	JTBC Entertainment	[Full Version] Musical Rising Star Park Kang-hyun, Phantom Singer 2 Episode 1
"I am music"	2020	EMK MUSICAL	[#ReplayMozart!] Sitzprobe LIVE
"Waving through a window" & "You will be found"	2021	Dingo Music	Musical actor Park Kang-hyun's AutumnLightLive [Dear Evan Hansen] Dingo Music
"You will be found"	2021	Universal Pictures	[Dear Evan Hansen] Korean Version MV Full Version
"Open your eyes"	2021	Korea Musical Awards	[3rd Korea Musical Awards] Celebration Performance: Musical The Man Who Laughs - Park Kang-hyun
"Epic III"	2021	clipservice	[#Hadestown] Release of the second music video for the Korean version (sung by Kang-hyun Park)
'Something's coming'	2022	Shownote	[22 West Side Story] Park Kang-hyun with The PIT Orchestra M/V
'The right to be happy'	2022	EMK MUSICAL	[#ReplayTheManWhoLaughs] - Park Kang-hyun & Min Young-ki
'It is not true!'	2022	EMK MUSICAL	[#ReplayTheManWhoLaughs] - Park Kang-hyun & Lee Sang-jun
'MAGIC'	2023	Warner Music Korea	Kang-hyun Park - Music Collaboration [Music Video]
'Vampire'	2023	MOSTCONTENTS	Kang-hyun Park - Heartbeat Original Sound Track Part.5
"Waving through a window"	2024	S&Co	[Dear Evan Hansen] Waving Through a Window

== Awards and nominations ==
Park received the Best New Actor award at the SACA Best Musical Actor Awards in 2017 for his performances in In the Heights, Evil Dead, and Chilseo. In 2018, he won the Best New Actor award at the Yegreen Musical Awards for his role as Gwynplaine in The Man Who Laughs. In 2019, he portrayed Lancelot in Xcalibur, earning the Best Supporting Actor award at the SACA Best Musical Actor Awards and the Korean Musical Awards in 2020. His performance as Orpheus in Hadestown in 2022 garnered him the Best Actor award at the 6th Korean Musical Awards, and the Star of the Year award at the 16th DIMF Awards. In 2024, he was nominated for the Best Actor award at the Korean Musical Awards for his role as Huey Calhoun in Memphis.

Year	Award	Category	Work	Role	Result
2017	2017 Stagetalk Audience Choice Awards (SACA)	Best New Male Artist	Evil Dead The Musical, Chilseo & In the Heights	Ash, King Gwanghae & Benny	Won
2018	The 7th Yegreen Musical Award	Best New Male Artist	The Man Who Laughs	Gwynplaine	Won
2019	The 13th Daegu International Musical Festival (DIMF)	New Artist/Rookie	Elisabeth	Luigi Lucheni	Won
2019	2019 Stagetalk Audience Choice Awards (SACA)	Best Supporting Actor	Xcalibur & Marie Antoinette	Lancelot & Axel von Fersen the Younger	Won
2020	The 4th Korea Musical Awards	Best Supporting Actor	Xcalibur	Lancelot	Won
2022	The 6th Korea Musical Awards	Best Actor	Hadestown	Orpheus	Won
2022	The 16th Daegu International Musical Festival (DIMF)	Star of the Year	Hadestown	Orpheus	Won
2024	The 8th Korea Musical Awards	Best Actor	Memphis	Huey Calhoun	Nominated
