= Phillip Jeong =

South Korean tenor and musical theatre actor

- 정필립
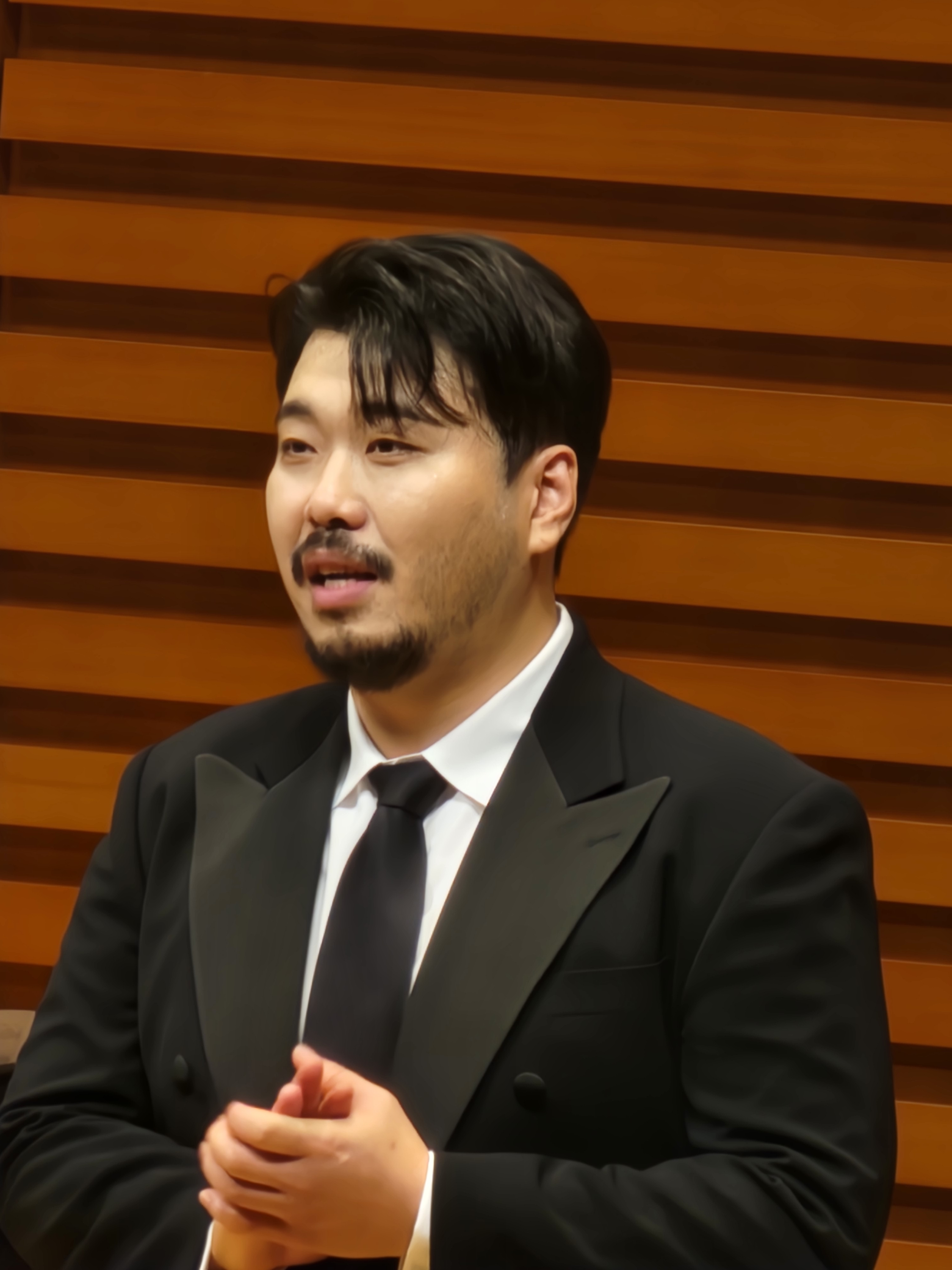
- Phillip Jeong at a recital in June 2023, Seoul, Korea
- Born: August 9, 1989 (age 37); Busan, South Korea
- Education: Korea National University of Arts
- Musical career
- Genre: Classical music
- Occupations: Musician; Musical actor
- Instrument: Tenor (vocal)
- Years active: 2017–present
- Label: Library Company
- Member of: Miraclass; Feel in

Phillip Jeong (Korean: 정필립; born August 9, 1989) is a South Korean tenor, crossover artist, and musical theatre actor. He studied vocal performance at the Korea National University of Arts, and became known to the Korean public after appearing on JTBC's television program Phantom Singer 2 in 2017. Jeong is a member of the crossover quartet Miraclass and has performed as part of the duo Feel in with fellow Miraclass member Tain Han. In 2023, Jeong released an album featuring classical vocal pieces and held a concert. Since 2019, he has also been involved in Korean musical theater.

== Early life and education ==
Phillip Jeong attended Peniel Arts High School with the aim of becoming a classical tenor. While at high school, he went to Italy to study, completing courses at Accademia Arena and Accademia Di Roma under Claudio Di Segni. Jeong returned to Korea to study under WoongGyun Lim at the Department of Vocal Music, School of Music, at the Korea National University of Arts.

Due to a lack of opportunities as a tenor in South Korea, Jeong moved to Italy, hoping for better prospects, but he found limited chances to perform or participate in competitions, and eventually returned to South Korea. He became a non-regular member of Busan Metropolitan Chorus.

== Phantom Singer ==
In 2017, Jeong took part in the JTBC audition television program Phantom Singer 2, which aimed to form a male crossover quartet. Jeong proceeded to the finals with the crossover team Miraclass, which consisted of Julian Jootaek Kim, Kang-hyun Park, and Tain Han, and finished as the runner-up.

Jeong's first audition song for Season 2 of Phantom Singer was "Mattinata". The quartet he belonged to in the semi-final round achieved the highest score with their performance of "La Vita". In the final rounds, the judges formed three quartet teams: Forestella, Miraclass, and Edel Reinklang.

Early in the competition, Jeong was criticized for his rigid sense of rhythm but as the competition progressed, he developed a more-flexible phrasing and rhythm. His voice earned him praise from judge Yoon Sang, who complimented his growth and stated Jeong had become one of his favorite voices.

== Miraclass ==
The crossover group Miraclass consists of Julian Jootaek Kim, Phillip Jeong, Kang-hyun Park, and Tain Han. Before the final rounds of Phantom Singer 2, they had to think of a team name within a limited time. Jeong coined the name Miraclass by combining the words miracle and class. After the conclusion of Phantom Singer 2, Miraclass secured a fan base and has been performing in concerts related to Phantom Singer, as well as holding their own team concerts. They also appear on broadcasts and release albums.

During the period when offline concerts were halted due to COVID-19, the JTBC program Phantom Singer All Stars was aired in 2021. Miraclass performed well in this show, securing numerous wins, including one MVP award, in the competitions among the nine participating groups. In the program, Jeong performed with the Miraclass members and with Se-kwon Ahn, Dong Hyun Kim, Hyung Ho Kang (PITTA), Bae Doo Hoon, and Minseok Kim.

== Feel in ==
In 2019, Phillip Jeong and Tain Han formed the dup Feel in, promoting easy listening music. Tain Han is a classically trained singer with a diverse spectrum of music, including rock, jazz, and pop. The duo, consisting of a tenor and a bass vocalists, performs songs across different genres, including Korean pop songs, old pop, chansons, jazz, canzone, musical numbers, and country music.

Their first performance was an in-flight concert on Asiana Airlines' inaugural flight from Incheon to Venice. They performed at concerts, and appeared on television and radio in Korea. They also held concerts twice in Hong Kong.

== Stage musicals and opera collage ==
The Taming of Casanova, an opera collage that includes famous arias from operas, was created to modernize opera and attract a larger audience in Korea. Jeong participated in this project to draw more people to the classical music genre. In Korea, where opera staging is limited due to a lack of public interest, only 56 performances were held in 2023. Jeong made his debut as a musical actor in Jack the Ripper: The Musical, playing the role of Detective Anderson. In September 2024, he appeared in the premiere of the original musical Buchihanan (Korean: 부치하난), portraying the antagonist roles of Hamoon (하문) in the present life and Mandarantu (만다란투) in the past life.

| Dates | Title | Venue | Role |
|---|---|---|---|
| 2018.06.24 to 2018.07.01 | Opera Collage, The Taming of Casanova, Korea | KBS Hall | Jimin |
| 2019.01.25 to 2019.03.31 | Jack the Ripper: Musical | Woori Financial Art Hall | Robert Anderson |
| 2023.03.24 to 2023.03.25 | Vamonos! Don Quixote | KEPCO Art Center | Sancho Panza |
| 2024.09.17 to 2024.11.17 | Buchihanan | Hongik Daehangno Art Center Grand Theater | Hamoon/Mandarantu |

== Concerts ==
Phillip Jeong began performing in concerts, starting with an outdoor concert of the Changwon City Dance Company at the 2015 Midsummer Night's Outdoor Concert. In 2015, he collaborated in the solo recital of French soprano Isabelle Vernet. After appearing in Phantom Singer 2 in 2017 and finishing as the runner-up with Miraclass, he started his career as a classical-and-crossover vocalist, individually and as part of the crossover group.

South Korea, with its highly concentrated metropolitan areas and declining populations in other regions, introduced the program "Cultural Empathy in Every Corner of Korea" ("방방곡곡 문화공감") through the Ministry of Culture, Sports and Tourism and the Korean Culture and Arts Centers Association to promote cultural empathy. This initiative aimed to take diverse cultural performances to smaller cities and rural areas, including at least 30% of underprivileged individuals in the audience. Jeong, Miraclass teammate Baritone Julian Jootaek Kim, and the BeHa Philharmonic Orchestra participated in this program. Traveling to nine cities in 2022 and 2023, they performed opera arias, Korean lyric songs, Spanish and Italian melodies, and musical numbers.

Jeong has primarily been active with groups like Miraclass and Feel in. In June 2023, he held his first solo recital, performing pieces including "Mattinata," which he first introduced to the public, arias by Tosti and Bellini, and pop and Korean lyrical songs. Accompanied by pianist Terry Jun-min Kang, the performance featured piano melodies and Jeong's voice without the aid of a microphone.

In a statement, Jeong said: "I aimed to deliver vivid emotions to the audience using just the piano and my vocal strength, without any amplification. I look forward to presenting even larger and more refined performances for my fans in the future." He has continued his vocal studies, and in November 2023, he released the album Esòrdio and held his second solo recital.

He has performed in Hong Kong at the HKAPA Academy Concert Hall (2024) and appeared at the HKGNA Music Festival alongside Sumi Jo and Warren Lee (2025). The following is a curated selection of his concerts.

| Dates | Title | Venue | Featuring |
|---|---|---|---|
| 2015.07.25 | 2015 Midsummer Night's Outdoor Concert | Jinhae Outdoor Theater | |
| 2015.11.13 | Recital by French Soprano Isabelle Vernet | Busan Cultural Center Concert Hall | |
| 2015.12.21 | 2015 Year-End Concert by Busan Culture: Korea-Paraguay International Cultural Exchange Concert | Busan Cultural Center Concert Hall | Vakh jongwhi |
| 2017.11.16 | Bernstein Memorial Concert | Sejong Center for the Performing Arts | |
| 2018.01.12 | Opera Carnival | Lotte Concert Hall | Doc-Ki Kim |
| 2019.05.19 | Gala Concert for The Taming of Casanova | Seoul Arts Center Concert Hall | Doc-Ki Kim |
| 2020.07.11 | Opera Carnival 2020 | Seoul Arts Center Concert Hall | Pf. James Jae-Won Moon |
| 2022.03.24 | Phantom & Queen The Magic | Suncheon Culture ＆ Arts Center Grand Theater | Bong-Mi Kim |
| 2022.08.05 | KF World Cinema Week Opening Ceremony Commemorating the 60th Anniversary of Korea-China-Latin America Diplomatic Relations | Jeongdong1928 Art Center | |
| 2022.09.17 | The Magic Phantom and Queen | Changwon Seongsan Art Hall Grand Theater | Bong-Mi Kim |
| 2023.06.15 | Celebration Concert for the Ministry of Patriots and Veterans Affairs' Promotion and the 70th Armistice Anniversary | Seoul National Cemetery | Chi Yong Chung |
| 2023.06.25 | Tenor Phillip Jeong Recital | Kukje Art Hall | Pf. Terry Kang |
| 2023.07.06 | The Magic Phantom and Queen | Nonsan Art Center Grand Performance Hall | Bong-Mi Kim |
| 2023.09.10 | Phantom 3 Tenors Concert: Minseok Kim, Phillip Jeong, and John Noh | Lotte Concert Hall | Kwang Hyun Kim |
| 2023.11.10 | The Magic Phantom and Queen | Haman Culture and Arts Center Grand Performance Hall | Bong-Mi Kim |
| 2023.11.11 | Tenor Phillip Jeong Recital | JCC Art Center | Pf. Terry Kang |
| 2024.05.01 | Jinju City Symphony Orchestra 106th Regular Concert: May Music Journey with Family | Gyeongnam Culture & Art Center | In-Hyeok Jeong |
| 2024.09.29 | Phillip Jeong Recital ESÒRDIO | HKAPA Academy Concert Hall, Hong Kong | Tain Han, Pf. Terry Kang |
| 2025.11.11 | HKGNA Music Festival 2025, Virtuoso Series | Hong Kong Jockey Club Amphitheatre | Sumi Jo, Warren Lee (pianist) |

== Television and media ==
Philip Jeong often sings solo or with other vocalists on Open Concert, a Korean Broadcasting System (KBS) television program. When he was a freshman at Korea National University of Arts (K-ARTS), a scene of him singing was aired on Documentary Three Days, on which a professor who listened to his song praised him, saying he "sparkles". When he appeared with Miraclass on KBS's show Immortal Songs: Singing the Legend, his unexpected sense of humor was displayed, leading KBS to create YouTube videos showing his backstage moments. He has also performed on major network television shows such as Art Stage on MBC and on Christian networks. Jeong also appears on radio programs.

| Year | TV Networks | Title of the show | Role | Notes |
|---|---|---|---|---|
| 2017 | JTBC | Phantom Singer 2 | Participant | Entire show |
| 2018 | MBC | TV Art Stage: Opera Carnival | Performer | With Julian Jootaek Kim |
| 2019 | KBS 1TV | Open Concert | Performer | As Feel in with Jeon Jeduk Band |
| 2019 | KBS2 | KBS Immortal songs | Guest, Performer | As Miraclass |
| 2020 | KBS 1TV | Open Concert | Performer | With Seung Jick Kim, Hyunsoo Kim, Scala Opera Choir |
| 2021 | JTBC | Phantom Singer All Stars | Himself | Main role, as Miraclass |
| 2021 | KBS2 | KBS Immortal songs | Guest, Performer | As Miraclass |
| 2021 | KBS2 | Documentary Three Days | Himself | Prof. WoongGyun Lim mentioning that Jeong Shines |
| 2021 | KBS 1TV | Open Concert | Guest, Performer | Solo and duet with Jisoo Sohn |
| 2022 | Busan Far East Broadcasting Company | Celebration Concert of the Busan Far East Broadcasting Company | Performer | With Julian Jootaek Kim, Hyunsoo Park, Song Eun Hye, Piano Eunchan Kim, Ha Juri Band |
| 2022 | EBS, Audio-e Knowledge | Julian Jootaek Kim and Taeyang Jeong's Opera Opera | Guest, Performer | E48-49, "Cavalleria Rusticana with Phillip Jeong" |
| 2022 | KBS 1TV | Open Concert | Performer | As Feel in |
| 2022 | Gwangju Far East Broadcasting Company | Gratitude Concert of the Gwangju Far East Broadcasting Company | Guest, Performer | With Julian Jootaek Kim, John Noh, Haeun |
| 2023 | KBS 1TV | Open Concert: The 30th Anniversary | Performer | Solo and trio with John Noh, You Chaehoon |
| 2024 | KBS 1TV | Open Concert, Ep 1491 | Performer | Solo and duet with Julian Jootaek Kim |

== Discography ==
Since his first recording in a participation release, Jeong has released six albums, including three from Universal Music (Decca Records) as a solo artist and as a member of Feel in.

Album (as Feel in)

Title
Feelin
Details
- Release date: June 5, 2019
- Label: Universal Music
- Format: CD, Digital download
Track listing

| No. | Title | Lyrics | Music | Arranged | Length |
|---|---|---|---|---|---|
| 1. | "Cheek to Cheek" | Irving Berlin | Irving Berlin | Youngjoo Song |
| 2. | "I've Got The World On A String" | Ted Koehler | Harold Arlen | Youngjoo Song |
| 3. | "La Vie En Rose" | Édith Piaf | Louiguy | Youngjoo Song |
| 4. | "Always On My Mind" | Willie Nelson | Willie Nelson | Youngjoo Song |
| 5. | "City of Stars" | Justin Hurwitz, Benj Pasek, Justin Paul | Justin Hurwitz, Benj Pasek, Justin Paul | Youngjoo Song |
| 6. | "Buongiorno Principessa" | Vincenzo Cerami | Nicola Piovani | Youngjoo Song |
| 7. | "Moondance" | Van Morrison | Van Morrison | Youngjoo Song |
| 8. | "So in Love" | Cole Porter | Cole Porter | Youngjoo Song |
| 9. | "Consolation" (위로) | Andrea Corr, Caroline Corr, Sharon Corr | Andrea Corr, Caroline Corr, Sharon Corr | Youngjoo Song |
| 10. | "Runaway" | Tain Han | Youngjoo Song | Youngjoo Song |
| 11. | "Parlami D'amore, Mariù" | Ennio Neri | Cesare Andrea Bixio | Youngjoo Song |
| 12. | "Mi Mancherai" | Marco Marinangeli | Luis Bacalov | Youngjoo Song |

Extended Release

| Title | Details |
|---|---|
| Far East Broadcasting Company A:MU Hymn＆Song Project: Love and Family 1 | Release Date: June 1, 2021; Label: CCMHUB, Far East Broadcasting Company A:MU; Format: Digital download; Track listing: 1. Love is always patient (Piano Hwan Ho Jung); 2. O perfect Love (hymn 604) (Piano Hwan Ho Jung); 3. Teacher's Grace (Piano Ha Juri) |
| Esòrdio | Release Date: October 14, 2023; Label: Library Company, Danal Entertainment; Format: Digital download; Track listing: 1. Mattinata (Leoncavallo); 2. Vaga luna che inargenti (Bellini); 3. O del mio amato ben (Donaudy); 4. A vuchella (Tosti); 5. L'alba separa dalla luce l'ombra (Tosti) |

Participation releases

| Title | Year | Details |
|---|---|---|
| "La Donna è Mobile" from Rigoletto by Giuseppe Verdi | 2019 | The Taming Of Casanova: Label: Universal Music; Artists: Hyunsoo Kim, Phillip Jeong, Julian Jootaek Kim, Benjamin Cho, Woorim Ko, Tain Han, Korea Coop Orchestra & Duk-ki Kim |
| "E Lucevan le Stelle" from Tosca by Giacomo Puccini | 2019 | The Taming Of Casanova: Label: Universal Music; Artists: Hyunsoo Kim, Phillip Jeong, Julian Jootaek Kim, Benjamin Cho, Woorim Ko, Tain Han, Korea Coop Orchestra & Duk-ki Kim |
| "Because We Believe" | 2021 | JTBC's Phantom Singer All Stars, Episode 7: Artists: Donghyun Kim, Se-Kwon Ahn, Kang-hyun Park, Phillip Jeong |

Single (as Feel in)

| Title | Details |
|---|---|
| "Feelin" (필인) | Release date: January 28, 2019; Label: Universal Music; Format: Digital download; Track listing: 1. Mi Mancherai; 2. Buongiorno Principessa; 3. Consolation (위로) |
