= Arang (musical) =

South Korean musical

Arang (Korean: 몽유도원; Hanja: 夢遊桃源; RR: Mongyudowon) is a South Korean musical based on the novella Mongyudowondo (몽유도원도) by South Korean novelist Choe Inho.

The musical premiered in November 2002 at the Opera Theater of the Seoul Arts Center. A substantially revised version opened in January 2026 at the National Theater of Korea.

The Korean title literally translates to "Dream Journey to the Peach Blossom Paradise", a reference to the classical motif of an idealized utopian realm. The English title Arang is derived from the name of the female protagonist.

The story is based on The Tale of Mrs. Domi, an old Korean folktale. While the original production portrayed Yeogyeong, the king Gaero of Paekche, as a morally corrupt ruler, the revised version restructures the narrative to place greater emphasis on Yeogyeong's psychological obsession with the woman seen in his dream and the resulting tragedy.

== Production history ==
Arang premiered on November 15, 2002, at the Opera Theater of Seoul Arts Center in Korea. Yun Ho-Jin, also known for the South Korean original musicals The Last Empress and Hero produced the show with the composer Kim Hee-kap and lyricist Yang In-ja, a team behind The Last Empress.

In 2026, a renewed production opened at the Haeoreum Grand Theater of the National Theater of Korea in January for a month, and is scheduled to transfer to Charlotte Theater in April. The score was completely rewritten by the composer Oh Sang-jun known for the South Korean musical Hero and Hero (2022 South Korean film).

The production company ACOM announced plans for the production at the David H. Koch Theater in August 2026 and selected actors who could travel to New York for the performance according to the audition notice.

== Characters ==
- Yeogyeong – The king of Paekje whose obsessive pursuit of an idealized woman seen in his dream drives the central tragedy of the musical.
- Arang – A woman who appears in Yeogyeong's dream and becomes the object of his obsession; she is married to Domi.
- Domi – Arang's husband and a tribal leader who lives apart from the royal court.
- Hyang-sil – A court official torn between loyalty to the king and moral responsibility.
- Bia – A female ritual attendant in the tribe where Arang and Domi reside.

== Casting ==
The principal roles were double-cast in both productions. In 2002, Yeogyeong was portrayed by Kim Do-hyeong and Kim Pub-lae, and Arang by Lee Hye-gyeong and Kim Sun-kyung; in 2026 Yeogyeong was portrayed by Min Woo-hyuk and Julian Jootaek Kim, and Arang by Ha Yun-ju and Yuria.

Role	2002	2026
Yeogyeong	Kim Do-hyeong, Kim Pub-lae	Min Woo-hyuk, Julian Jootaek Kim
Arang	Lee Hye-gyeong, Kim Sun Kyung	Ha Yun-ju, Yuria
Domi	Seo Young-joo	Lee Choong-joo, Kim Sung-sik
Hyang-sil	Cho Seung-ryong	Seo Young-joo, Jeon Jae-hong
Bia		Hong Ryoon-hee, Jung Eun-hye

== Production credits ==
Production credits include Yun Ho-jin (2002) and Yun Hong-sun (2026) as producers, and Moon Jeong Kim as music director.

Production	2002	2026
Book	Kwang-rim Kim	Ahn Jae-seung
Composer	Kim Hee-kap	Oh Sang-jun
Lyricist	Yang In-ja	Yang Jae-seon
Producer	Yoon Ho-jin	Yoon Hong-sun
Director	Yoon Ho-jin	Yoon Ho-jin
Arrange/Orchestration	Peter Casey, Kwon Hyeok-sun	Kim Jin-Hwan
Music Director	Moon Jeong Kim	Moon Jeong Kim

== Synopsis ==
Set in the Paekje period, the musical follows King Yeogyeong, who becomes obsessed with a woman he encounters in a dream. His pursuit of Arang, the wife of Domi, leads to a tragic conflict between desire, loyalty, and power. The story is based on the Korean folktale The Tale of Mrs. Domi.

== Critical reception ==
Upon its premiere in 2002, Arang received mixed critical responses. Contemporary reviews praised the production's visual design and its emphasis on Eastern aesthetics, while also noting weaknesses in musical memorability and narrative pacing.

The 2026 revival was generally received more favorably, with critics highlighting its expanded musical score, large-scale choreography, and visual storytelling that blended traditional Korean elements with Western orchestration.
