= Julian Kim =

Julian Kim may refer to:

- Julian Jootaek Kim (born 1986), South Korean baritone opera singer, crossover artist, and musical theater performer
- Julian Leow Beng Kim (born 1964), Malaysian prelate of the Catholic Church
