= Korea Musical Awards (2017) =

Korea Musical Theater Association awards

- Current: 7th Korea Musical Awards
- Awarded for: Excellence in musical theatre
- Date: January 16, 2017
- Location: Seoul
- Country: South Korea
- Presented by: Korea Musical Theater Association
- First award: 2017
- Final award: 2023

Highlights
- Most nominations: 7 - Red Book
- Website: Korea Music Award Official Website

Television/radio coverage
- Network: Naver TV

The Korea Musical Awards (Korean: 대한민국뮤지컬페스티벌 한국뮤지컬어워즈) is a representative awards ceremony held in January every year to revitalize the musical market and to encourage and congratulate the musicians who are working hard in the art scene. It is organized by Korea Musical Theater Association and supported by Ministry of Culture, Sports and Tourism, Arts Council Korea, and LG Arts Center, Seoul. First awards ceremony was held in 2017.

There were other musical awards with similar name in Korea from 1995 to 2013, hosted by the newspaper Sports Chosun, however it's already discontinued.

== Categories ==
=== Art ===
- Grandprize
- Best Musical
- Best Musical Small Theater

=== Individual ===
- Best Actress
- Best Actor
- Best Supporting Actress
- Best Supporting Actor
- Best New Actress
- Best New Actor
- Best Ensemble Award

=== Creation ===
- Best Script
- Best Composer
- Best Music Director
- Best Choreography
- Best Director
- Best Staging Techniques
- Best Producer

== Artwork ==
=== Best Musical Grand Prize ===
No.	Year	Winner	Note
1st	2017	Sweeney Todd	
2nd	2018	Benhur	
3rd	2019	The Man Who Laughs	
4th	2020	Hope: Unread Books and Lost Life?	
5th	2021	Marie Curie	
6th	2022	Hadestown	
7th	2023	Showman - A Dictator's Fourth Body Double	

=== Best Musical (over 400 seats) ===
No.	Year	Winner	Note
1st	2017	Natasha, the White Donkey, and Me	
2nd	2018	Seopyeonje	
3rd	2019	Red Book	
4th	2020	Sweeney Todd (musical)	
5th	2021	Swag Age: Shout Out, Joseon!	
6th	2022	Red Book	
7th	2023	Death Note	

=== Best Musical Award Small Theater ===
No.	Year	Winner	Note
1st	2017	—N/a	
2nd	2018	Maybe Happy Ending	
3rd	2019	Bernarda Alba	
4th	2020	Aranga	
5th	2021	Lizzie	
6th	2022	Who Lives in Kuroi's Mansion?	
7th	2023	Let Me Fly	

== Individual Division ==
=== Best Actress ===
No.	Year	Winner	Note
1st	2017	Jeon Mi-do — Sweeney Todd (스위니토드)	
2nd	2018	Jeon Mi-do — Maybe Happy Ending	
3rd	2019	Jung Young-joo — Bernarda Alba	
4th	2020	Kim Seon-young — Hope: Unread Books and Lost Life?	
5th	2021	Kim Soo-ha — Rent	
6th	2022	Cha Ji-yeon — Red Book	
7th	2023	Lee Ja-ram — Sepyeonje	
8th	2024	Jeong Sun-ah — If/Then	

=== Best Actor ===
No.	Year	Winner	Note
1st	2017	Jeong Seong-hwa — Kinky Boots	
2nd	2018	Hong Kwang-ho — Cyrano	
3rd	2019	Park Hyo-shin — The Man Who Laughs; Choi Jae-rim — Matilda	
4th	2020	Cho Hyung-kyun — Cyrano	
5th	2021	Kang Pil-seok — Something Rotten!	
6th	2022	Kang-hyun Park — Hadestown	
7th	2023	Yoon Na-moo — Showman - A Dictator's Fourth Body Double	
8th	2024	Cho Seung-woo — The Phantom of the Opera	

=== Best Supporting Actress ===
No.	Year	Winner	Note
1st	2017	Shin Youngsook — Rebecca	
2nd	2018	Shin Youngsook — Phantom	
3rd	2019	Kim Kook-hee — Red book	
4th	2020	Lee Yee-un — Hope: Unread Books and Lost Life?	
5th	2021	Lee Bom-sori — The chami	
6th	2022	Kim Sun-young — Hadestown	
7th	2023	Choi Jeong-won — Matilda	

=== Best Supporting Actor ===
No.	Year	Winner	Note
1st	2017	Park Eun-tae — Dorian Gray	
2nd	2018	Lee Jung-yeol — Seopyeonje	
3rd	2019	Han Ji-sang — A Gentleman's Guide to Love and Murder	
4th	2020	Park Kang-hyun — Xcalibur	
5th	2021	Seo Kyung-soo — Something Rotten!	
6th	2022	Choi Jae-rim — Chicago	
7th	2023	Kang Hong-seok — Death Note	

=== Best New Actress ===
No.	Year	Winner	Note
1st	2017	Lee Ye-eun — The Wicked	
2nd	2018	Yi So-yeon — Seopyeonje	
3rd	2019	Kim Hwan-hee — Bernarda Alba	
4th	2020	Kim Soo-ha — Swag Age: Shout out, Joseon	
5th	2021	Han Jae-ah — Maybe Happy Ending	
6th	2022	Jang Min-je — Beetlejuice (musical)	
7th	2023	Lim Ha-yoon, Jin Yeon-woo, Choi Eun-young, and Hasinbi —Matilda	

=== Best New Actor ===
No.	Year	Winner	Note
1st	2017	Kim Sung-cheol — Sweeney Todd	
2nd	2018	Son Yoo-dong — History of the loser	
3rd	2019	Lee Hwi-jong — Do and Brothers Karamazov	
4th	2020	Yang Hee-jun — Swag Age: Shout out, Joseon	
5th	2021	Lee Jun-young — Swag Age: Shout out, Joseon	
6th	2022	Kim Si-hoon, Lee Woo-jin, Jeon Kang-hyuk, Joo Hyun-jun — Billy Elliot	
7th	2023	Lee Hyung-hoon — Let Me Fly	
8th	2024	Julian Jootaek Kim — The Phantom Of The Opera	

=== Best Ensemble Award ===
No.	Year	Winner	Note
1st	2017	Kinky Boots (킹키부츠)	
2nd	2018	Benhur	
3rd	2019	Mathilda	
4th	2020	Aida	
5th	2021	42nd Street	
6th	2022	The Great Comet	
7th	2023	West Side Story	

== Best Creative ==
=== Best Producer ===
No.	Year	Winner	Note
1st	2017	Uhm Hong-hyun — Mata Hari	
2nd	2018	Han Kyung-sook — Maybe Happy Ending	
3rd	2019	Park Myung-sung — Matilda Billy Elliot	
4th	2020	Oh Hoon-shik — Hope: Unread Books and Lost Life?	
5th	2021	CJ ENM — Finding Mr. Destiny, 42nd Street, Werther, Big Fish, Maybe Happy Ending, Kinky Boots	
6th	2022	Shownote — The Great Comet, A Gentleman's Guide to Love and Murder, Headwick	
7th	2023	Kim Mih-hye, Park Min-sun — Mrs. Doubtfire	

=== Best Director ===
No.	Year	Winner	Note
1st	2017	Oh Se-hyuk — Natasha, the White Donkey, and Me	
2nd	2018	Kim Dong-yeon — Maybe Happy Ending	
3rd	2019	Oh Kyung-taek — Red book	
4th	2020	Ohrupina — Hope: Unread Books and Lost Life?	
5th	2021	Kim Tae-hyong — Marie Curie	
6th	2022	Kim Dong-yeon — Who Lives in Kuroi's Mansion?	
7th	2023	Kim Dong-yeon — Death Note	

=== Best Playwright ===
No.	Year	Winner	Note
1st	2017	Park Hae-rim — Natasha, the White Donkey, and Me	
2nd	2018	Hue Park and Will Aronson— Maybe Happy Ending	
3rd	2019	Young Jung — Dedication of Suspect X	
4th	2020	Kang Nam — Hope: Unread Books and Lost Life?	
5th	2021	Cheon Se-eun — Marie Curie	
6th	2022	Pyo Sang-ah — Who Lives in Kuroi's Mansion?	
7th	2023	Han Jeon-seok — Showman - A Dictator's Fourth Body Double	

=== Music Award Arrangement/Music Director ===
No.	Year	Winner	Note
1st	2017	Lee Jin-wook — Rachmaninov	
2nd	2018	Will Aronson — Maybe Happy Ending	
3rd	2019	Kim Seong-soo — Bernarda Alba	
4th	2020	Shin Eun-kyung — Hope: Unread Books and Lost Life?	
5th	2021	Kim Seong-soo — Something Rotten!	
6th	2022	Yang Joo-in — Red Book	
7th	2023	Kim Seong-soo — Jesus Christ Superstar	

=== Composer Award ===
No.	Year	Winner	Note
1st	2017		
2nd	2018		
3rd	2019		
4th	2020	Kim Hyo-eun — Hope: Unread Books and Lost Life?	
5th	2021	Choi Jong-yoon — Marie Curie	
6th	2022	Kim Bo-young — Who Lives in Kuroi's Mansion?	
7th	2023	Hong Min-chan — Let Me Fly	

=== Best Choreography ===
No.	Year	Winner	Note
1st	2017	Shin Seon-ho — Rogisu	
2nd	2018	Cha Jin-yeop — Along with the Gods	
3rd	2019	Hong Yu-seon — Red Book	
4th	2020	Moon Seong-woo — Benhur	
5th	2021	Kim Eun-chong — Swag Age: Shout out, Joseon	
6th	2022	Lee Hyun-jung — Lizzy	
7th	2023	Kim Dong-yeon — Death Note	

=== Stage Arts Award ===
No.	Year	Winner	Note
1st	2017	Oh Pil-young (stage) — Mata Hari	
2nd	2018	Seo Sook-jin — Benhur	
3rd	2019	Oh Pil-young (stage) — The Man Who Laugh	
4th	2020	Park Joon (video) — City of Angels	
5th	2021	Oh Pil-young (stage) — A Gentleman's Guide to Love and Murder	
6th	2022	Oh Pil-young (stage) — The Great Comet	
7th	2023	Oh Pil-young (stage, lighting, video, accessories director) — Death Note	

== Special Award ==
=== Staff Award ===
No.	Year	Winner	Note
2nd	2018	Kim Moon-jung	

=== New Wave Award ===
No.	Year	Winner	Note
3rd	2019	Ready to Fly	

=== Special Merit Award ===
No.	Year	Winner	Note
1st	2017	Park Man-gyu	
2nd	2018	Kang Dae-jin	
3rd	2019	Lee Jong-deok	
4th	2020	—	
5th	2021	The musical	
6th	2022	Daegu International Musical Festival	
7th	2023	Yoon Bok-hee	

== Award milestones ==
Some notable records and facts about the Korea Musical Awards include the following:

- The 2nd edition of awards. Maybe Happy Ending received the most awards, with six trophies: Will Aronson for Best Music, Will Aronson and Hue Park for Best Book, Kim Dong-yeon for Best Director, Han Kyung-sook for Best Producer, Jeon Mi-do for Best Actress in a Leading Role and Best Small Theater Musical.
- The 6th edition of awards was held at the Blue Square, Shinhan Card Hall on January 10, 2022. The nominations were announced on December 20, 2021. The musical Red Book was nominated in 7 categories: Best Musical, Best Leading Actress (Female), Best Supporting Actor (Male), Best New Artist (Female), Producer Award, Directing Award, and Music Award.
