= Julian Jootaek Kim =

South Korean opera singer, crossover artist and musical actor (born 1986)

- 김주택
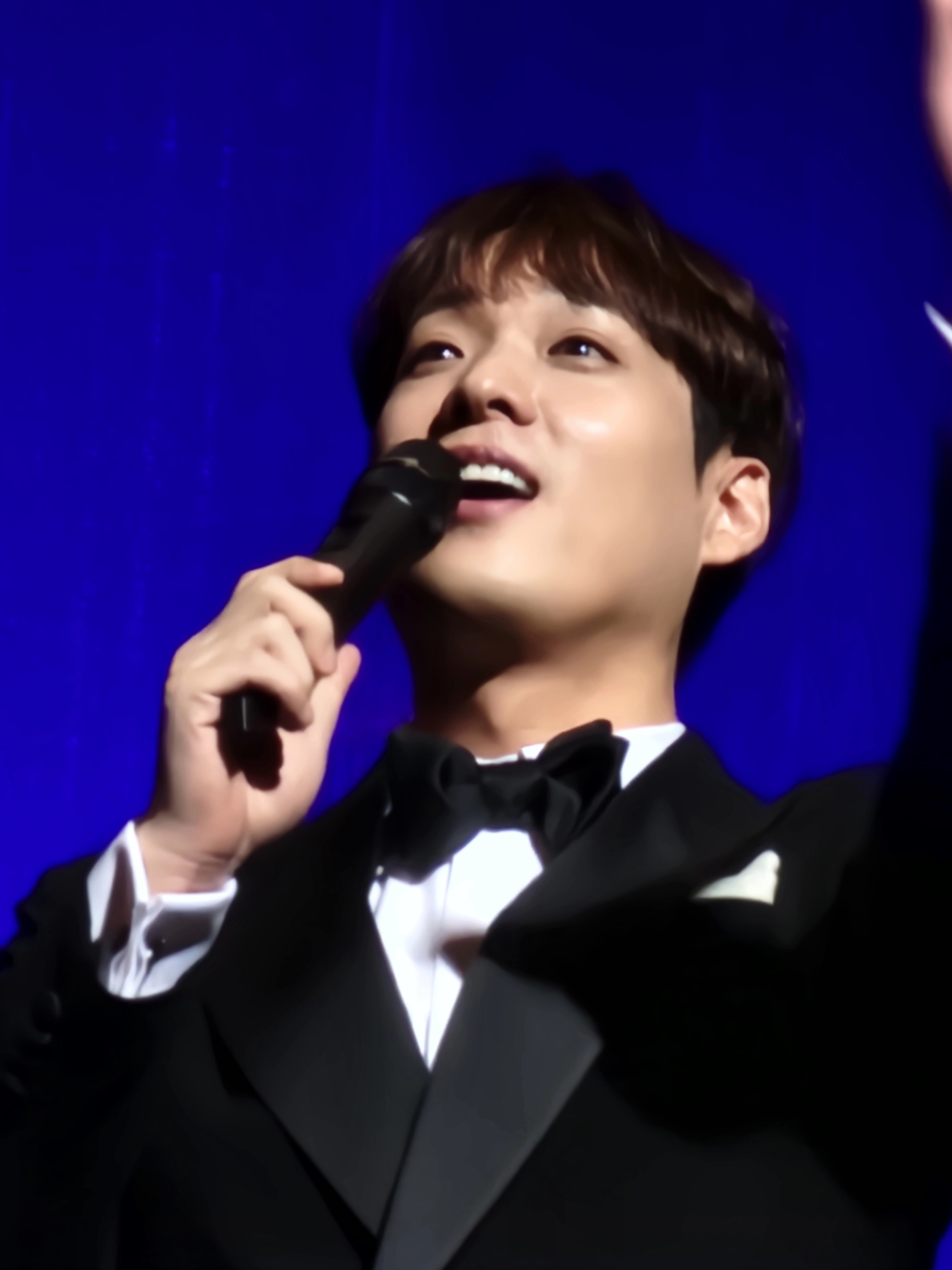
- Kim at the curtain call of the 2024 Morning Music Stroll Concert, September 2024, Goyang, Korea
- Born: September 9, 1986 (age 40)
- Education: Milan Conservatory
- Occupations: Opera singer; crossover group member; musical actor
- Website: juliankim.com

Julian Jootaek Kim (Korean: 김주택), also known as Julian Kim, is a South Korean baritone opera singer, crossover artist, and musical theater performer. He was born on September 9, 1986. Kim is known for his portrayal of Figaro in the opera Il barbiere di Siviglia in Italy, which he performed more than 70 times, and as the Phantom in a Korean replica production of Andrew Lloyd Webber's musical, The Phantom of the Opera.

== Singing competitions ==
Kim won the Grand Prize in The Korea Voice Competition by the Lee DaeWoong Music Scholarship Foundation and won first place in the Music Chunchu Competition and Shin Youngok Competition during his high school years in Korea. In Italy, he received the Premio Miglior Giovane Promessa (Best Young Promise Prize) in the Renata Tebaldi International Competition in 2007. Additionally, he won second place in the Riccardo Zandonai Competition and International Lyric Competition Magda Olivero and first place and the Young Voices Award by the City of Magenta in 2009, followed by third place in the Francesc Viñas International Singing Competition and second place in the International Singing Competition Maria Caniglia in 2011. In 2012, he won second place in the Concorso Internazionale di Canto Lirico Giacinto Prandelli, the International Singing Competition Maria Caniglia, and the Verdian Voices International Singing Competition. He won first place in the International Singing Competition of Toulouse and second place in the Viotti International Music Competition. He also received fourth place and second place in the Seoul International Music Competition in 2007 and 2013, respectively, alongside the Myung-whun Chung Miracle of Music Awards in Korea in 2011.

== Opera ==
Kim's debut took place in 2009 at the Teatro Pergolesi in Jesi, Italy, where he performed as Figaro in Il barbiere di Siviglia. He has since portrayed leading roles in La traviata, The marriage of Figaro, Madama Butterfly, Cavalleria rusticana, Il barbiere di Siviglia, Simon Boccanegra, Il signor Bruschino, Das Rheingold, Lucia di Lammermoor and La bohème

Julian Jootaek Kim made his debut at Teatro La Fenice in 2013, portraying the character Marcello in La bohème. As of June 2024, he has performed on the stage 104 times, earning acclaim for his prominent baritone roles in Attila (Ezio), Il barbiere de Serville (Figaro), La traviata (Germont), La bohème (Marcello), and Don Carlo (Rodrigo).

== Phantom Singer (TV program) ==
Phantom Singer is a JTBC television audition program in Korea that forms a male crossover vocal quartet. Julian Jootaek Kim mentioned feeling his heart race while watching the first season of Phantom Singer, leading to a realization that he needed a change in his life. Among the finalists in season 2, Kim was the only opera singer working abroad.

He emerged as the runner-up and joined Miraclass. Following the show, he continued his crossover activities in Korea while maintaining his operatic career in Italy. During this period, he performed in opera productions in Italy until the start of Phantom Singer season 3.

== Miraclass ==
Miraclass is a crossover quartet composed of Julian Jootaek Kim, Phillip Jeong, Kang-hyun Park, and Tain Han. The group released its first full-length album, Romantica in 2018 and participated in various concerts.

During the COVID-19 pandemic, Miraclass participated in Phantom Singer All Stars. The group received multiple first-place finishes, including an MVP award for its performance of Josh Groban's "Mai."

Since its formation on September 26, 2017, Miraclass has continued holding concerts, releasing full-length albums, and operating a YouTube channel named Just-10-minute.

== Concerts ==
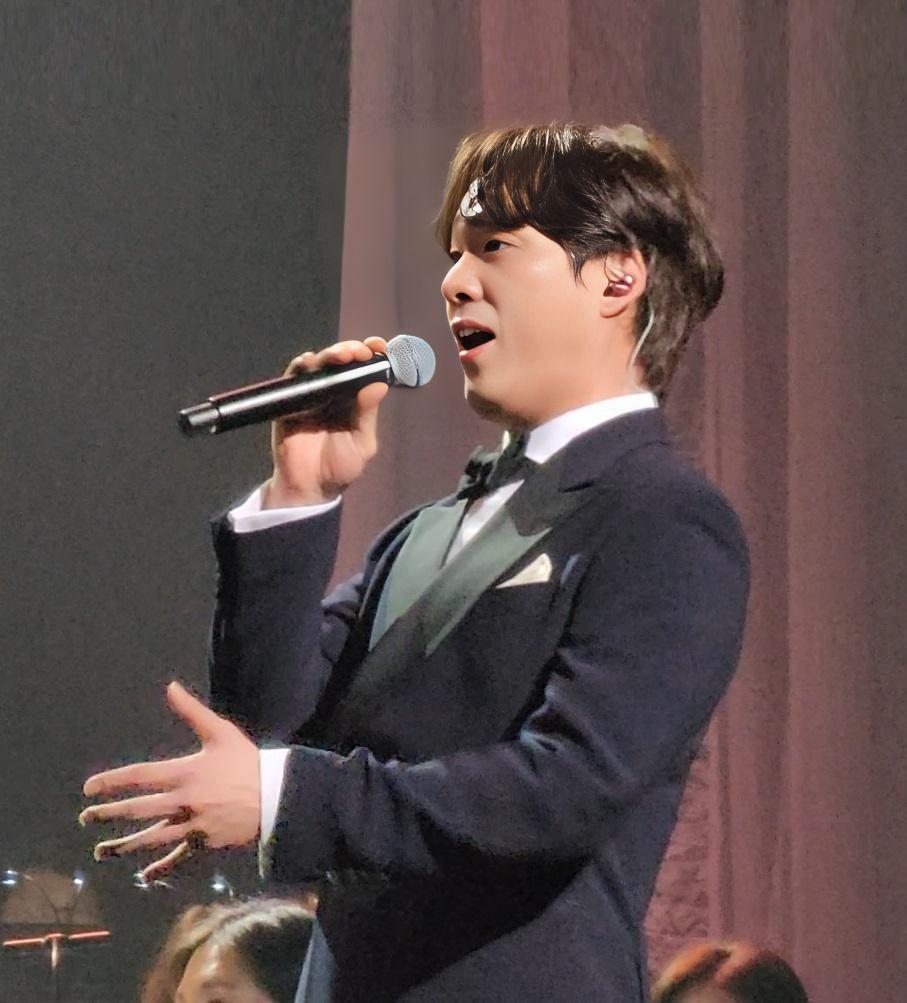
Kim at the Ock Joo-hyun with Friends concert, 2024 in Suwon, Korea

For his activities as a member of Miraclass, see Miraclass

Kim has taken part in 20 concerts linked to Italian opera across different countries such as Italy, Russia, Austria, Japan, and Korea. These performances included collaborations with conductors Edoardo Müller, Pietro Mianiti, and Marco Boemi. Additionally, he has engaged in classical concerts alongside opera singers and crossover events in Korea, totaling over 100 concerts, excluding those with the crossover group Miraclass.

In concert adaptations of Das Rheingold under the baton of Myung-whun Chung in Seoul in 2014, and Fidelio conducted by Sir Antonio Pappano in Rome in 2016, Kim assumed the roles of Donner and Don Fernando, respectively. He has been a prominent soloist in concerts overseen by Myung-whun Chung. Notably, he was one of 8 soloists in Mahler's Symphony No. 8 performed by the Seoul Symphony Orchestra in 2011, the sole male soloist for the Expo 2012 Concert, and performed Verdi's arias at the Salzburg Easter Festival in 2013, all under the direction of Myung-whun Chung.

Kim was actively involved in concerts and operas in Korea during the early 2010s. However, his significant introduction to the Korean audience was perhaps through the Baritone Julian Jootaek Kim Recital (바리톤 김주택 리사이틀) in 2015 in Seoul. Kim's performance in this recital led to him receiving the Best New Artist Award at the 2nd Seoul Art Center Award in 2016.

From 2016 to 2019, Kim participated in The Taming of Casanova, an opera collage featuring famous arias from diverse operas that aimed to attract a wider audience to the classical music domain.

In 2019, Kim presented additional recitals. Following a fan concert in 2021, he now regularly hosts a set of concerts titled Baritone Julian Jootaek Kim's Music Library, featuring performances of opera arias, classical tunes, Italian canzones, musical numbers, and Korean songs.

== Stage musicals ==
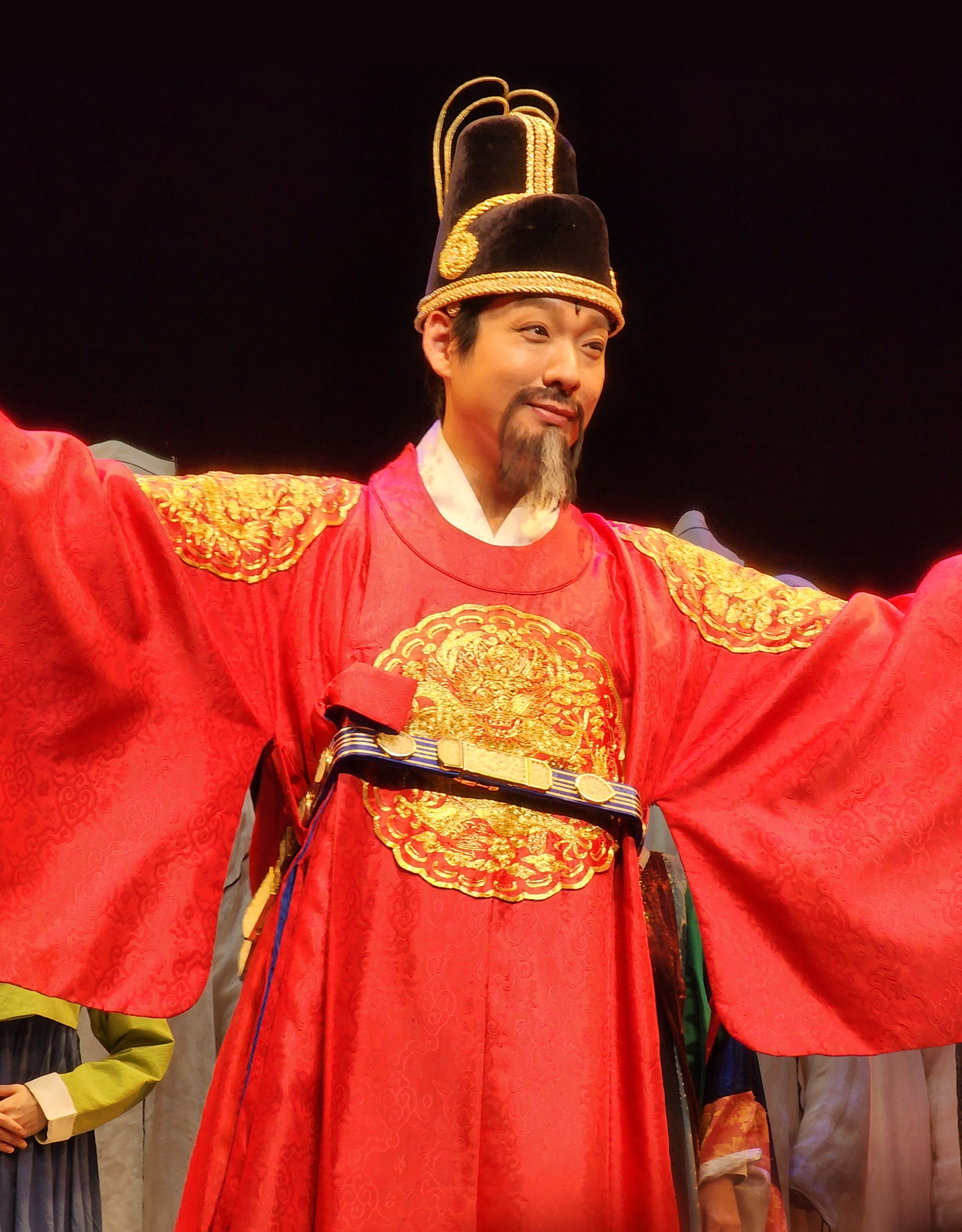
Kim at the curtain call as Emperor Gojong in the 2025 Korean original musical The Last Empress

Julian Kim auditioned online for the Korean production of The Phantom of the Opera produced by the Really Useful Group and was selected as one of the four actors cast as the Phantom for the 2023–2024 production. His debut performance occurred on March 28, 2023, in Busan, followed by 31 performances in Seoul and 21 in Daegu, totaling 82 performances. He also received positive reviews for his powerful operatic voice and for his performance as the Phantom, which balanced strength and sensitivity. For his portrayal of the Phantom, he received The New Male Actor Award at the 8th Korea Musical Awards in January 2024.

Julian Kim portrayed Pierre Bezukhov in the Korean production of the musical Natasha, Pierre, and the Great Comet of 1812 from March to June 2024. He also played Emperor Gojong in the 30th anniversary production of the musical The Last Empress from December 2024 to July 2025, followed by the role of Yeogyeong, the 21st king of the Baekje dynasty, in the musical Arang from January to May 2026. He will play the title role in the 10th anniversary production of the musical Sweeney Todd: The Demon Barber of Fleet Street from December 2026 to May 2027, sharing the role with Cho Seung-woo and Kang Pil Seok.

Dates	Title	Role	Venue	No perf.
2023-03-28 to 2023-06-18	The Phantom of the Opera	The Phantom	Dream Theater, Busan, Korea	30
2023-07-14 to 2023-11-18	The Phantom of the Opera	The Phantom	Charlotte Theater, Seoul, Korea	31
2023-12-22 to 2024-02-04	The Phantom of the Opera	The Phantom	Keimyung Art Center, Daegu, Korea	21
2024-03-28 to 2024-06-16	Natasha, Pierre & The Great Comet of 1812	Pierre Bezukhov	Universal Art Center, Seoul, Korea	33
2024-12-10 to 2024-12-15	The Last Empress	Gojong	Keimyung Art Center, Daegu, Korea	2
2024-12-20 to 2024-12-29	The Last Empress	Gojong	Dream Theater, Busan, Korea	4
2025-01-21 to 2025-03-30	The Last Empress	Gojong	Sejong Grand Theater, Seoul, Korea	30
2025-04-04 to 2025-07-27	The Last Empress	Gojong	Korean tour	21
2026-01-27 to 2026-02-22	Arang	Yeogyeong	Haeoreum Grand Theater, National Theater of Korea	18
2026-04-10 to 2026-05-10	Arang	Yeogyeong	Charlotte Theater, Seoul, Korea	18
2026-12-04 to 2027-05-02	Sweeney Todd: The Demon Barber of Fleet Street	Sweeney Todd	D-Cube Link Arts Center, Seoul, Korea	TBA

== TV and media ==
For his activities as a member of Miraclass, see Miraclass

=== TV ===
Julian Jootaek Kim Kim appeared in all episodes of the TV shows Phantom Singer 2 and Phantom Singer All Stars. Kim performs in programs such as Open Concert (Korean: 열린음악회) and TV Art Stage (Korean: TV 예술무대) on major Korean television networks from time to time.

Year	Title
2013	KBS Classic Odyssey, September 4
2014	Simon Boccanegra, November 22
2016	Fidelio - Pappano and Santa Cecilia, October 20
2017	Phantom Singer 2, August 11 to November 3
2019	TV Art Stage, July 13
2020	JTBClecture, December 31
2021	Phantom Singer All Stars, January 26 to April 20
2021	King of Mask Singer, October 24
2022	TV Art Stage, March 15
2022	Opera Gala Land, December 25
2023	Open Concert, July 9
2023	2024 새날마중 (New Year's Welcome), December 31
2024	SBS Culture: Sunhwa Arts School 50th Anniversary Alumni Concert
2024	Hankyung arteTV, Opera House, Season 2, Episode 5
2025	Open Concert, May 18

=== Radio & other media ===
Two series of opera education programs featuring Julian Kim's name in their titles have been broadcast on EBS in South Korea. Running from May 14, 2021, to August 26, 2022, Julian Jootaek Kim and Taeyang Jeong's Opera Opera consisted of 64 online episodes. Guest vocalists included You chaehoon, Yoo Seulgi, Baek Intae, ByeongMin Gil, John Noh, and Gihoon Kim. In 2022, excerpts from Lucia di Lammermoor were also performed in concert at the Seoul Art Center with So Young Park, Rim Park, and Ku Bon Su, separate from the radio series. In 2022, Kim presented the VOD lecture series Julian Jootaek Kim's Opera Odyssey, which ran from June 21 to July 6, 2022.

== Awards and recognition ==
He won the Best New Artist Award at the Seoul Arts Center award in 2015 and Best New Actor Award at the 8th Korean Musical Awards in 2024.

=== Awards ===
Year	Award	Category	Work	Result
2015	The 2nd SAC (Seoul Arts Center) Awards, Korea	Best New Artist	Baritone Julian Jootaek Kim Ricital, (May 31, 2015)	Won
2024	The 8th Korea Musical Awards	Best New Male Artist	The Phantom in the musical The Phantom Of The Opera	Won

== Discography ==
=== Albums ===
Title	Details	Peak chart position	Sales
Title	Details	KOR	Sales
Verdi: Giovanna d'Arco (Live)	Released: March 25, 2016; Label: Dynamic srl, Italy; Artists: Jessica Pratt/Jean-Francois Borras/Julian Kim; Choir: Coro del Teatro Petruzzelli di Bari; Conductor: Riccardo Frizza; Orchestra: Orchestra Internazionale d'Italia; Composer: Giuseppe Verdi; Formats: DVD/Blu-ray, digital download		
Italiana	Released: June 5, 2019; Label: Arts & Artists, Decca Records, Korea; Formats: CD, digital download	2	1,547

=== Extended plays ===
Title	Details
Monologue	Release date: July 1, 2022; Label: Library Company, Danal Entertainment; Formats: digital download

=== Singles ===
Title	Year	Details
"Heart Flower (Korean: 마음꽃)"	2009	Original Sound Track of TV drama, The Iron Empress (Korean: 천추태후), two versions
"Non Ti Scordar Di Me"	2019	Release date: May 31, 2019; Label: Arts & Artists, Decca Records; Formats: digital download

=== Participation releases ===
Title	Year	Details
Tra 'poeti maledetti' e cabaret (Duparc, Chausson, Fauré, Debussy, Ravel, Ibert, Poulenc)	2008	ISBN 88-467-2269-8: book with CD attached; Published by Teatro Comunale di Casalpusterlengo, Italy; Artists: Sabina Belei, Loris Bertolo, Gianfranco Cerreto, Luca Ciammarughi, Francesca Franzil, Jootaek Kim, Myung-Jae Kho, Marco Laganà, Antonella Matarazzo, Angela Nisi, Raffaella Novel, Marta Tacconi, Paola Vianello, Barbara Vignudelli
"Chanson Romanesque" (Don Quichotte à Dulcinèe)	2008	La Musica E Il Bene - Stagione 2006/2007: Label: Suonare Records, Italy; Artists: Various Artists
"Chanson Epique" (Don Quichotte à Dulcinèe)	2008	La Musica E Il Bene - Stagione 2006/2007: Label: Suonare Records, Italy; Artists: Various Artists
"Chanson à Boire" (Don Quichotte à Dulcinèe)	2008	La Musica E Il Bene - Stagione 2006/2007: Label: Suonare Records, Italy; Artists: Various Artists
Schubert: Drei Gesange, D. 902: 12. "L'ncanto degli Occhi"	2015	Korean Young Musicians: Label: KBS Classic FM, Aulos Media, Korea; Artists: Seil Kim & Julian Jootaek Kim
Drei Gesange, D. 902: "Ll traditor deluso"	2015	Korean Young Musicians: Label: KBS Classic FM, Aulos Media, Korea; Artists: Seil Kim & Julian Jootaek Kim
Drei Gesange, D. 902: "Il modo di prender moglie"	2015	Korean Young Musicians: Label: KBS Classic FM, Aulos Media, Korea; Artists: Seil Kim & Julian Jootaek Kim
Obradors: "La mi sola, Laureola" from Canciones Clasicas Espanolas	2015	Korean Young Musicians: Label: KBS Classic FM, Aulos Media, Korea; Artists: Seil Kim & Julian Jootaek Kim
"Del cabello mas sutil" from Canciones Clasicas Espanolas	2015	Korean Young Musicians: Label: KBS Classic FM, Aulos Media, Korea; Artists: Seil Kim & Julian Jootaek Kim
Verdi: "Morte di Rodrigo e Sommossa" from Don Carlo	2015	Korean Young Musicians: Label: KBS Classic FM, Aulos Media, Korea; Artists: Seil Kim & Julian Jootaek Kim
"Alfin questo corsaro...Cento leggiadre vergini" from Il corsaro	2015	Korean Young Musicians: Label: KBS Classic FM, Aulos Media, Korea; Artists: Seil Kim & Julian Jootaek Kim
"The Blooming Day (Korean: 꽃피는 날)"	2017	Phantom Singer 2, Episode 3: Korea Copyright Commission No 100001663354; JTBC (TV program)
Donizetti: "Bella Siccome Un Angelo," Don Pasquale	2019	The Taming of Casanova: Label: Universal Music; Artists: Hyun Soo Kim, Jeong Phillip, Julian Kim, Benjamin Cho, Woo Rim Ko, Tain Han, Korea Coop Orchestra & Doc-Ki Kim
Mozart: "Finch'han Dal Vino," Don Giovanni	2019	The Taming of Casanova: Label: Universal Music; Artists: Hyun Soo Kim, Jeong Phillip, Julian Kim, Benjamin Cho, Woo Rim Ko, Tain Han, Korea Coop Orchestra & Doc-Ki Kim
Thomas: "O vin. dissipe la tristesse," Hamlet	2019	The Taming of Casanova: Label: Universal Music; Artists: Hyun Soo Kim, Jeong Phillip, Julian Kim, Benjamin Cho, Woo Rim Ko, Tain Han, Korea Coop Orchestra & Doc-Ki Kim
"Perdere L'Amore"	2021	Phantom Singer All Stars: JTBC (TV program)
"Rosalina"	2021	Phantom Singer All Stars: JTBC (TV program)
"Yours (Korean: 너의것)"	2021	Phantom Special Concert Recording: Korea Copyright Commission No 100004242098; Seoul Arts Center
"Liberation Army Arirang"	2021	Songs of Independence Army: Independence Hall of Korea, Cheonan, Korea; Recorded at AUDIOGUY; Artists: Cheonan City Philharmonic Orchestra

=== Music Videos ===
Song title	Year	Channel	Notes
"Yearning for the queen"	2025	Dingo Music	Julian Kim – "Yearning for the Queen" from the Musical The Last Empress

== Voice ==
Julian Kim is a Verdian baritone. Kim can sing up to a high C note using his chest voice and has often been compared to Cappuccilli. His voice has been described as a Verdi baritone, characterized by warmth, resonance, and phrasing and tone. Critics have also praised his Italian diction, particularly his pronunciation of the Italian 'R'.

== Notable performances ==
=== Il barbiere di Siviglia ===
Since Kim made his opera debut performing Il barbiere di Siviglia, he has portrayed the character of Figaro in the production 75 times across various cities in Italy. Reviews of his Figaro performance stated: 'Julian Kim is Figaro: the Korean baritone would perhaps be more at ease in singing parts; the diction was not always exact, but the high notes were beautiful, the accent was lively, and the color of the voice remained beautiful,' 'The artistic direction, spearheaded by Cristiano Sandri, made unexpected choices in forming an excellent cast, well blended in terms of both vocal quality and stage presence. The result is a brilliant Figaro, vocally very well set up, portrayed by the South Korean Julian Kim,' and 'The cast is dominated by the bold and very youthful Figaro of Julian Kim: the Korean baritone brings to life and supports an unrestrained character through a bold and luminous melodiousness, and an irresistible stage presence.'

=== Fidelio ===
Fidelio, the sole opera composed by Ludwig van Beethoven, was presented in concert format at Rome's Sala Santa Cecilia in Parco della Musica, conducted by Sir Antonio Pappano in 2016. Julian Kim took on the role of the king's minister, Don Fernando. In critics' reviews, Julian Kim was praised as 'The still very young baritone from South Korea Julian Kim offered a surprise as the beautifully singing Don Fernando. A real cavalier baritone, who is currently studying in Milan, gave a tremendous test of talent and also with an almost Austrian German diction! You should remember this name' and 'Julian Kim's Don Fernando is seraphic, above all thanks to a soft timbre and soft phrasing that distinguish Korean.'

=== Don Carlo ===
Following the record-breaking flood in Venice in 2019, Don Carlo was staged at Teatro La Fenice amidst challenges. Julian Kim portrayed Rodrigo, the Marquis of Posa, in this production. The critiques highlight: 'Excellent performance by Julian Kim (Posa), who possesses a remarkable voice, characterized by its dark timbre and skilled modulation between forte and piano.' They also stated: 'Among the performers, the most Verdian voice, exemplifying weight and solidity, belongs to baritone Julian Kim, notable for his portrayal as the Marquis of Posa, a role that received substantial directorial attention.' Furthermore, 'The Korean baritone, Julian Kim, excelled in his role as Rodrigo, showcasing outstanding vocal prowess. His well-supported singing voice, with its appealing timbre, coupled with secure phrasing enriched by subtle accents, added depth to his character portrayal. Additionally, his mastery in crafting the vocal line imbued his singing with a natural lyrical quality that was pleasing to the ear.'

=== The Phantom of the Opera ===
Julian Kim's first musical role was the Phantom in Andrew Lloyd Webber's The Phantom of the Opera in Korea in 2023. In the critique of the Busan performance, it was noted that 'Julian Kim presented a new appearance through his first musical, The Phantom of the Opera. He captured the Phantom's intense fixation on Christine and portrayed the character's madness effectively with his explosive vocal presence and compelling energy that filled the venue,' and 'Baritone Julian Jootaek Kim, venturing into a musical for the first time, captivated audiences from his initial performance with his rich voice. Known as the 'Eastern Cappuccilli' for his numerous opera performances in Europe, he demonstrated dynamic vocal prowess that suited the role of the gifted musician in The Phantom of the Opera.'

Praise for his vocal abilities continued with each performance in Seoul. 'Undoubtedly, he demonstrated a singing ability that rivals any Phantom on any stage in the world... Few Phantoms adequately convince the audience of Christine's fainting on stage. However, Julian Kim delivered a flawless 'The Music of the Night' that could make not only Christine but also the audience faint.' In the critique of the performance, particular emphasis was placed on Kim's transformation during the second act, starting from the number 'The Point of No Return.' Initially embodying the obsessive and explosive Phantom, Kim's evolution in acting was highlighted, transitioning from a character consumed by obsession to one who gradually discovers feelings of love. Kim delivered a commanding portrayal of the Phantom, earning him the Best New Male Artist Award at the 8th Korea Musical Awards, a recognition bestowed upon actors who made their debut in Korean musical theaters within the past three years.

Kim is frequently invited to perform during national ceremonies in Korea and at ceremonial concerts in both Italy and Korea.

== Influences ==
Kim admired Piero Cappuccilli, who was known for his extended phrasing and resonant high notes, qualities not commonly found in a baritone.

Gianni Tangucci, serving as a judge for the Zandonai International Competition, played a significant role incasting him in his opera debut as Figaro in Il barbiere di Siviglia at the Teatro Pergolesi. This opportunity marked the beginning of Kim's career in the operatic career. Tangucci frequently cast Kim in productions at renowned venues in Italy.

Kim has also cited Maestro Myung-whun Chung as an important influence. They first met when Kim participated in the Young Artist Program at La Scala. Maestro Chung, impressed by Kim's baritone voice, has since invited him to perform in numerous concerts and operas in Italy and Korea. During their interactions, Kim pledged to work diligently, to which Chung imparted a memorable piece of advice: "Doing your best is not enough. Everyone does that. You have to have you in your voice."
