= Mattinata (Leoncavallo) =

1904 song by Ruggero Leoncavallo

"Mattinata" (Italian pronunciation: [mattiˈnaːta]; English: "Morning") was the first song ever written expressly for the Gramophone Company (the present day EMI). Composed by Ruggero Leoncavallo in 1904, it was dedicated to Enrico Caruso, who was the first to record it in April 1904 with the composer at the piano. Ever since, the piece has been a concert favourite of tenors.

== Text ==
Italian

L'aurora di bianco vestita
Già l'uscio dischiude al gran sol;
Di già con le rosee sue dita
Carezza de' fiori lo stuol!
Commosso da un fremito arcano
Intorno il creato già par;
E tu non-ti desti, ed invano
Mi sto qui dolente a cantar.

Metti anche tu la veste bianca
E schiudi l'uscio al tuo cantor!
Ove non-sei la luce manca;
Ove tu sei nasce l'amor.

Ove non-sei la luce manca;
Ove tu sei nasce l'amor.

English translation

The dawn, dressed in white,
has already opened the door to the sun,
and caresses the flowers with its pink fingers.
A mysterious trembling seems to disturb all nature.
And yet you will not get up, and vainly
I stand here sadly singing.

Dress yourself also in white,
and open the door to your serenader!
Where you are not, there is no light;
where you are, love is born.

Where you are not, there is no light;
where you are, love is born.

== Notable interpretations ==
The song was recorded by the Italian-born tenor Sergio Franchi on his American debut album, Romantic Italian Songs (RCA Victor Red Seal, 1962). In only three months, Franchi's album of mostly Neapolitan favorite songs placed number 17 on the Billboard Top 200. Thirty-six years later (eight years after Franchi's death) the same album placed number 167 on the Billboard 200.

Emilio Pericoli recorded a cover version for Warner Bros. Records in 1964. The Costa Rican band Gaviota recorded a Spanish version in 1982, for CBS Indica Records; the arrangement was the work of Carlos Guzmán Bermúdez.

== Scores ==
- IMSLP / Petrucci Music Library
