= Luigi Lucheni =

Italian anarchist (1873–1910)

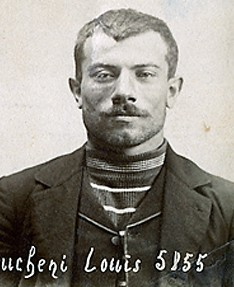
- Swiss police mugshot of Luigi Lucheni (1898)
- Born: April 22, 1873; Paris, France
- Died: October 19, 1910 (aged 37); Geneva, Switzerland
- Cause of death: Suicide
- Resting place: Zentralfriedhof; Vienna, Austria; 48°08′58″N 16°26′28″E
- Criminal charge: Murder of Empress Elisabeth of Austria
- Criminal penalty: Life imprisonment
- Military career
- Allegiance: Kingdom of Italy
- Branch: Royal Italian Army
- Service years: 1893–1896
- Conflicts: First Italo-Ethiopian War

Luigi Lucheni (born Louis Lucheni; 22 April 1873 – 19 October 1910) was an Italian anarchist and the assassin of Empress Elisabeth of Austria.

== Early life ==
Louis Lucheni was born in Paris on April 22, 1873. His father, unknown, and his mother, Luigia Lucchini, left the child to a foundling hospital. The child was moved to Italy in August 1874 and transferred between orphanages and foster families. Lucheni worked odd jobs in Italy, Switzerland, and Austria-Hungary. He served in the military for three years and moved to Switzerland, where he befriended anarchists in Lausanne.

== Assassination ==
On September 10, 1898, Lucheni used a tapered file to fatally stab Empress Elisabeth of Austria during her visit to Geneva. Elisabeth and her lady-in-waiting Countess Sztáray had departed their hotel on Lake Geneva to ride a paddle steamer to Montreux. They walked without their attendants, as Elisabeth disdained royal processions. On the docks in the early afternoon, Lucheni approached and stabbed Elisabeth below her left breast with a wooden-handled, four-inch file, the kind used to file the eyes of industrial needles. Badly wounded, she nevertheless continued walking, with the support of two other people, 100 yards to board the departing steamer. The steamer returned to shore after Countess Sztáray first noticed Elisabeth's bleeding, whereupon the Empress was carried back to the hotel on a makeshift stretcher. Two doctors pronounced her dead within an hour of the attack. Documentation of the autopsy was destroyed.

Lucheni was apprehended upon fleeing the scene and his file was found the next day. He told the authorities that he was an anarchist who came to Geneva with the intention of killing any sovereign as an example for others. Lucheni used the file because he did not have enough money for a stiletto.

His trial began the next month, in October. He was furious to find that capital punishment had been abolished in Geneva, and wrote a letter demanding that he be tried in another canton, such that he could be martyred. He received the sentence of life imprisonment instead.

== Death and legacy ==
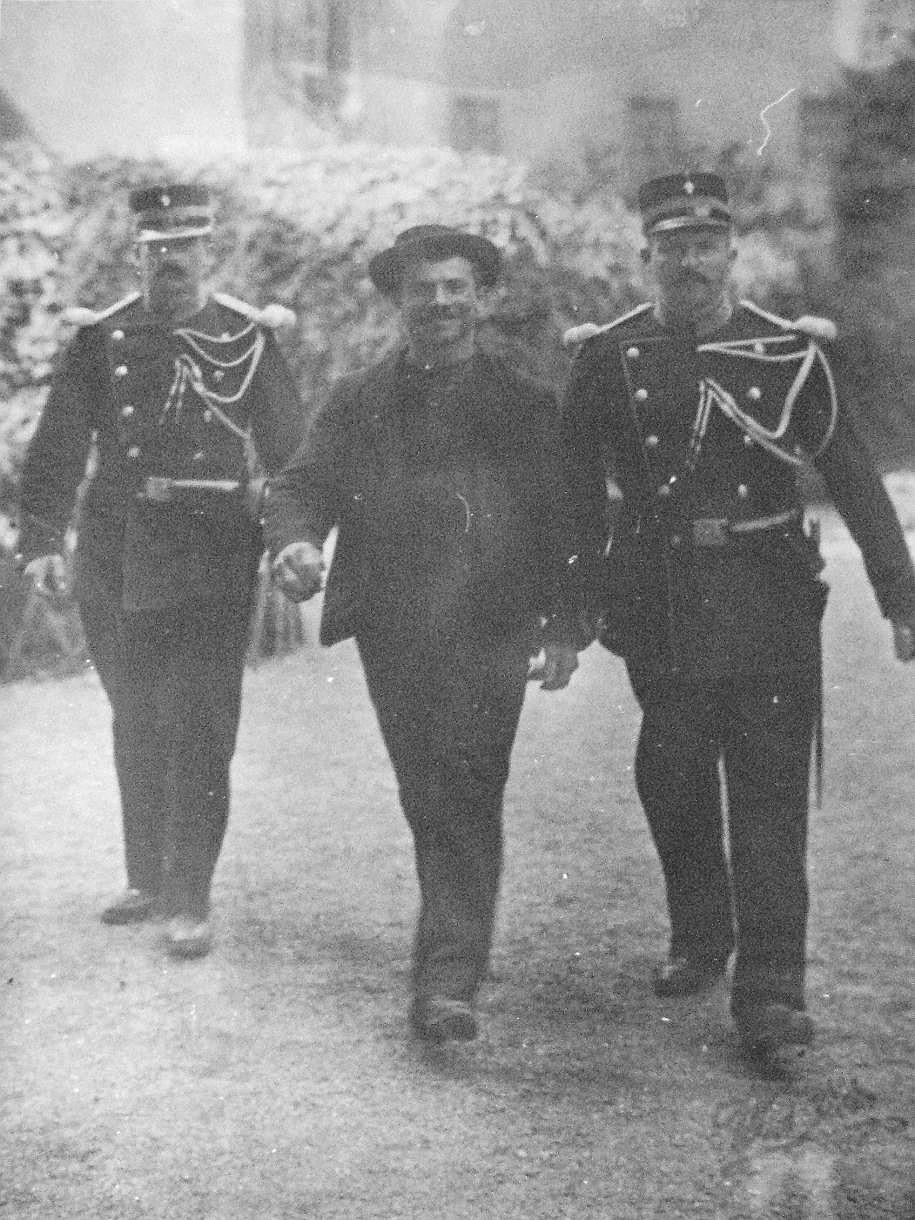
Lucheni in custody in 1898

Lucheni wrote his childhood memoirs while in Geneva's Évêché prison. He was harassed in prison and his notebooks were stolen. He was found hanged in his cell on October 19, 1910. His head was preserved in formaldehyde and transferred to Vienna in 1986. The head was on display in Vienna's Narrenturm until 2000 when the remains were interred at the Wiener Zentralfriedhof.

The assassination resulted in the International Conference of Rome for the Social Defense Against Anarchists, the first international conference against terrorism, which resolved to begin agencies to surveil suspected anarchists and permit capital punishment for assassination of sovereigns. Elisabeth's life and subsequent murder are depicted in many stage productions, films and novels. Lucheni's childhood memoirs were published in 1998.

Rebecca West sketches Lucheni's motives in Black Lamb and Grey Falcon: "Luccheni said with his stiletto to the symbol of power, ‘Hey, what are you going to do with me?’ He made no suggestions, but cannot be blamed for it. It was the essence of his case against society that it had left him unfit to offer suggestions, unable to form thoughts or design actions other than the crudest and most violent. He lived many years in prison, almost until his like had found a vocabulary and a name for themselves and had astonished the world with the farce of Fascism."

== Bibliography ==
- Enckell, Marianne (March 26, 2015). "LUCCHENI Luigi (Louis, dit)". Dictionnaire des anarchistes (in French). Paris: Maitron/Editions de l'Atelier.
- Jensen, Richard Bach (2014). The Battle against Anarchist Terrorism: An International History, 1878–1934. Cambridge: Cambridge University Press. ISBN 9781107034051.
- Jensen, Richard Bach (2015). "Anarchist Terrorism and Global Diasporas, 1878–1914". Terrorism and Political Violence. 27 (3). Routledge: 441–453. doi:10.1080/09546553.2015.1032032. ISSN 1556-1836. OCLC 5857472280. S2CID 142633873.
- Levy, Carl (2007). "The Anarchist Assassin and Italian History, 1870s to 1930s". In Gundle, Stephen; Rinaldi, Lucia (eds.). Assassinations and Murder in Modern Italy. New York: Palgrave Macmillan. pp. 207–222. ISBN 978-1-4039-8391-6.
- Newton, Michael (2014). "Elisabeth of Austria (1837–1898)". Famous Assassinations in World History: An Encyclopedia. Santa Barbara: ABC-CLIO. pp. 132–135. ISBN 978-1-61069-285-4.
- Pernicone, Nunzio; Ottanelli, Fraser M. (2018). "Anarchist Assassins: Acciarito, Angiolillo, and Lucheni". Assassins against the Old Order: Italian anarchist violence in fin de siècle Europe. Chicago: University of Illinois Press. pp. 90–122. ISBN 978-0-252-05056-5. LCCN 2017057350.
- Rozenblatt, Daphne (October 2016). "The Assassin's Smile: Facial Expression as Political Expression". History of Emotions - Insights into Research. Max Planck Institute for Human Development: 1–4. doi:10.14280/08241.48.
