= GS Tower =

Skyscraper in Seoul, South Korea

- GS타워

General information
- Type: Office, performing arts, art hall, retail, restaurants
- Location: Seoul, South Korea
- Coordinates: 37.502423°N 127.037589°E
- Completed: 1997

Technical details
- Floor count: 38

Design and construction
- Architect: Skidmore, Owings & Merrill
- Structural engineer: Skidmore, Owings & Merrill

GS Tower, also called GS Gangnam Tower (formerly LG Kangnam Tower), is a 38-story (173 meters) modern skyscraper located in the Gangnam District area of Seoul, South Korea. It was completed in 1997 and is a mixed-use facility consisting of an art hall, performing arts theatre, corporate exhibition hall, offices, retail, restaurants, health club and parking.

Given the LG Arts Center's location within the building and urban neighborhood, close to the Seoul subway lines and major roads it was designed to provide a soundproof space.

== Structural System ==
The building is engineered by SOM. The lateral system consists of a combination of braced frames and perimeter moment frames.
