= Warren Lee (pianist) =

Hong Kong musician

Warren Wai On Lee is a Hong Kong-born pianist, Steinway Artist, a regular featured artist of the Hong Kong Philharmonic Orchestra, composer and a music educator. He was awarded the Ten Outstanding Young Persons Award (Hong Kong) in 2012, elected an Associate of the Royal Academy of Music in 2015 and awarded the Ian Mininberg Distinguished Alumni Award by the Yale University in 2017 in recognition of his achievements in the performing arts and contribution to the community.

At the age of six, he made his début with the Hong Kong Philharmonic Orchestra. Following his Macau début with the Macau Chamber Orchestra at the age of ten, the South China Morning Post wrote, “Warren Lee's performance bore out the insight… that exceptional artists are not so much people to be praised as phenomena to be treasured, bearers of a power altogether greater than the poor vessels that contain it.” He went on to become the first prize winner of the 1995 Stravinsky Awards International Piano Competition and the Grand Prix Ivo Pogorelich. In 2000, he graduated from the Royal Academy of Music and Yale School of Music with the highest of honors.

As a music educator, he released in 2008 his educational CD album, “From Bach To Gershwin: A Musical Journey” (Universal Music Hong Kong 480102-0). The Audio Land Magazine calls it a "rare successful album that Hong Kong can be proud of." He has also been appointed a guest professor by the Central Conservatory of Music EOS Orchestra Academy and an honorary artist-in-residence by the Hong Kong Institute of Education. He is also co-currently serving as the music director of his alma mater, St. Paul's Co-educational College in Hong Kong.

His discography includes a total of 11 albums, 10 of which released on the Naxos label. The American Record Guide calls him a "first-rate artist".

As a composer, his choral works are published by Pavane Publishing (USA), Profiri & Horvath (Germany); and his series of Piano Sight-reading Method is due for release by Brio Music Press (Hong Kong). His a cappella choral work, "House Rules" won the Second Prize of the Gianni Bergamo Awards in 2013 in Switzerland.

Lee also holds an MBA degree from the Hong Kong University of Science and Technology and is elected to the Beta Gamma Sigma. He also holds a Master in Law from the University of London, specialising in Intellectual Property Law.

As a renowned pianist, Lee was hailed by critics as a pianist:

"With technique to burn, an extraordinary intellect, and a Horowitzian colour of romanticism, he left us all quite stunned."

— Roger Shields, Founder of the Stravinsky Awards International Piano Competition

“[With] superb pianism… wonderful sense of colour and… impeccably controlled articulation… Not for nothing have the piano makers Steinway enlisted Lee as one of their signature artists…”

— Marc Rochester, Straits Times Singapore, September 12, 2011
