= Seoul Arts Center =

Coordinates: 37.480433°N 127.0111903°E

Seoul Arts Center 예술의 전당
- Established: 1988
- Location: Nambusunhwan-ro 2406 (700 Seocho-dong), Seocho-gu; Seoul, South Korea
- Type: Art center
- Director: Shin Hyeon-taek
- Website: www.sac.or.kr/site/eng/home

- Seoul Arts Center
- Hangul: 예술의 전당
- Hanja: 藝術의 殿堂
- RR: Yesurui jeondang
- MR: Yesurŭi chŏndang

The Seoul Arts Center (SAC; Korean: 예술의 전당) is an arts complex in Seocho District, Seoul, South Korea. It consists of five main buildings: the Opera House, with three auditoriums; the Music Hall, which includes the Concert Hall, Recital Hall, and IBK Chamber Hall; the Hangaram Art Museum; the Hangaram Design Museum; and the Seoul Calligraphy Art Museum. The Opera House is built in a shape that resembles the traditional Korean bamboo hat called gat.

In January 1982, the government decided to build a Seoul Arts Center, which would be in charge of the overall function of artistic activities, and began to select a site. This announcement was aimed at the 1986 Asian Games and the 1988 Seoul Olympics. The final site was decided in September of the same year at the foot of the mountain between Nambu Beltway and Mt. Umyeon (area: 231,000m^{2}), and on November 14, 1984, a groundbreaking ceremony was held with the National Gugak Center.

The construction of the Seoul Arts Center was divided into Phase 1 (1984 – 1988) and Phase 2 (1988 – ). In February 1988, the first phase of construction, the Music Hall and Calligraphy Hall, was completed and opened. In October 1990, the Hangaram Art Museum and the Seoul Art Archives opened, and on February 15, 1993, the Seoul Opera Theater (currently the Opera House) opened and was completed.

By August 2016, Seoul Arts Center had recorded a cumulative audience of 50 million visitors since its opening, according to its official institutional chronology.

== Music hall ==
It opened in 1988, the first among the buildings belonging to the hall, and has a 2,505-seat concert hall, the first concert hall in Korea, and a 354-seat recital hall where small-scale performances such as recitals and chamber music are held. It is adjacent to the right side of the Opera House and opposite the Seoul Calligraphy Museum. The Music Hall complex was expanded with the opening of the IBK Chamber Hall in October 2011. The new venue added a dedicated space for chamber music performances to the center's existing Concert Hall and Recital Hall.

== Opera House ==
It is a cylindrical building with a roof in the shape of a lampshade. At the time of its design and construction, it was called "Festival Theater", but when it opened in 1993, its official name was changed to the Seoul Opera Theater (currently Opera House). The 2,305-seat Opera Theater for large-scale opera, ballet, and musical performances, the 1,004-seat Towol Theater for plays, small-scale musicals and operas, and a 300-600-seat flexible small theater for small experimental performances are located. It forms the central axis of the entire Seoul Arts Center.

== Hangaram Art Museum ==
Opened in 1990, this museum focuses on the exhibition of contemporary art . It is a steel and glass building located on the left wing of the Opera House.

== Hangaram Design Museum ==
The Hangaram Design Museum opened in November 1999, according to the Seoul Arts Center's official institutional history. On the 2nd and 3rd floors of the building, there is also the Arko Art Information Center, an institution under the Korean Culture and Arts Council.

== Seoul Calligraphy Museum ==
Opened in 1988 at the same time as the Music Hall, it is currently the only exhibition hall dedicated to calligraphy works in the world. In addition to traditional calligraphy works, experimental works by contemporary calligraphers are also on display.

== Other facilities ==
There is an outdoor space named Music Square, Art Square, and Staircase Square between each performance hall and art gallery. There is a short hiking trail next to the fountain, which is also used by hikers.

There are also restaurants, cafes, cafeterias, musical instrument stores, costume rental stores, record stores, ticket offices, and children's playrooms. Although not affiliated with the hall, teachers at the Korea National University of Arts Conservatory and Dance Center and the National Gugak Center continue to the right side of the Music Hall and Calligraphy Hall to provide education and tradition It is being used as a venue for artistic performances.

The Academy of Arts, an educational institution, is divided into three fields, music, art, and calligraphy, and is used as a place for citizens to enjoy lectures on hobbies, appreciation meetings, and education for the gifted.

Live performance of the Hallelujah chorus from Handel's Messiah (HWV 56) at the Center's Concert Hall, by the National Chorus of Korea

The center is home to the Korea National Ballet, the Korea National Opera, the Korean Symphony Orchestra, the Korea National Contemporary Dance Company and the National Chorus of Korea.Resident Organizations | About SAC | About | Seoul Arts Center

Established in 1988 to "develop and promote art and culture, and to expand people's opportunities for cultural enjoyment," the center has developed into the representative art and culture complex in Korea.

=== SAC on Screen ===
In May 2013, Seoul Arts Center launched SAC on Screen, a project to produce screen-based versions of performances. The initiative extended the center's activities beyond performances attended in person by introducing the use of recorded performance content. The center also offers DIGITAL STAGE, an online platform through which audiences can watch performance videos on computers, tablets, and smartphones.
