= King of Mask Singer =

2015 South Korean television program

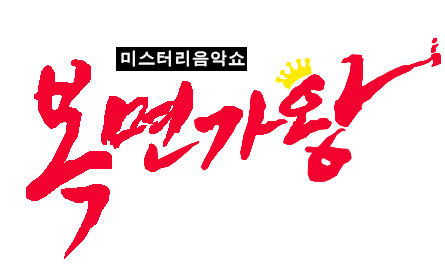
- The King of Mask Singer logo
- Also known as: Mystery Music Show: King of Mask Singer; King of Masked Singers; The Masked Singer Korea
- Genre: Reality television Variety show Music
- Written by: Park Won-woo; Ahn Young-ran; Kim Hyo-jeong; Woo Jeong-hwa; Jung Shi-yoon; Song Bo-ra; Kim Hyang-soo
- Directed by: Noh Si-yong; Oh Noo-ri
- Creative director: Seo Chang-man
- Presented by: Kim Sung-joo
- Country of origin: South Korea
- Original language: Korean
- No. of episodes: Pilot: 1; Special Live: 2; Special: 12; Regular: 391; (list of episodes)

Production
- Executive producer: Park Jeong-gyu
- Running time: 105 minutes
- Production company: MBC Entertainment

Original release
- Network: MBC TV
- Release: February 18, 2015 (pilot)
- Release: April 5, 2015 – present

Related
- Sunday Night

The King of Mask Singer (Korean: 미스터리 음악쇼 복면가왕; RR: Miseuteori eumaksyo bongmyeongawang; lit. 'Mystery Music Show: Masked Singer's King') is a South Korean singing competition program presented by Kim Sung-joo, with introductions by voice actor Lee Won-joon. It airs on MBC on Sunday, starting from April 5, 2015, as a part of MBC's Sunday Night programming block. It was originally broadcast as a holiday special program, but it was so popular that it became a regular program.

== Format ==
Each competition lasts for two episodes, with the singers competing one-on-one in three elimination rounds. They are given elaborate masks which are made by designer Hwang Jae-geun and gloves to wear in order to conceal their identity, thus removing factors such as popularity, career and age that could lead to prejudiced voting. In the first round, both contestants sing the same song, while in the second and third round they each sing a solo song. The winners of each pair are selected by the audience and panel of celebrities through instant live votes. The identities of the singers are not revealed until they have been eliminated. The winner of the third round challenges the previous competition's Mask King, and is either eliminated or becomes the new Mask King. Ha Hyun-woo of Guckkasten ("Music Captain of Our Local"), Yunmin of TOUCHED ("The Joys And Sorrows Also Count As Rock") and Jung Joon-il ("Perfume Over Flowers") have nine consecutive wins, which is the highest number of wins achieved by any contestant (and highest number of both males and females)

Due to great interest and demand, the show released a special album consisting of a selection of studio recordings by the competitors.

== List of Masked Kings ==
(The contestant's names in bold are the male and female Mask King with the most wins.)

King #	Generation #	Contestant		Occupation	Winning		Eliminated in Episode #	Voting Average
King #	Generation #	Stage Name	Real Name	Occupation	Time(s)	Episodes (for main singing stage)	Eliminated in Episode #	Voting Average
—	None	Self-Luminous Mosaic	Solji of EXID	Singer	1	Pilot	None	54.21%
1	1–2	Used Two Buckets of Gold Lacquer	Luna of f(x)	Singer	2	1–2, 4	6	52.02%
2	3	Jingle Jingle Lark	Jinju	Singer	1	5–6	8	49.49%
3	4–7	CBR Cleopatra	Kim Yeon-woo	Singer	4	7–8, 10, 12, 14	16	67.97%
4	8	King of Song Tungki	Lee Jung	Singer	1	15–16	18	67.27%
5	9	Give A Taste Of Spicy Miss Pepper	Yeoeun of Melody Day	Singer	1	17–18	20	55.15%
6	10–11	Go! Hawaii	Hong Ji-min	Musical Actress	2	19–20, 22	24	58.08%
—	None	Sexy Vocal Cricket	Jo Jang-hyuk	Singer	1	Special Live 2015 (between 23 and 24)	34	60.97%
7	12	Write With Love Pencil	Sonya (South Korean singer)	Singer & Musical Actress	1	23–24	26	53.33%
8	13–16	Young and Innocent Cosmos	Gummy	Singer	4	25–26, 28, 30, 32	34	66.33%
9	17–21	Amazon Cat-Girl	Cha Ji-yeon	Musical Actress	5	33–34, 36, 38, 40, 42	44	61.27%
10	22–30	**Music Captain of Our Local**	**Ha Hyun-woo** of Guckkasten	Singer	**9**	43–44, 46, 48, 50, 52, 54, 56, 58, 60	62	68.22%
11	31–32	An Out-and-Out Escape	The One	Singer	2	61–62, 64	66	59.26%
12	33–34	Romantic The Dark Knight	Roy Kim	Singer	2	65–66, 68	70	61.45%
13	35	Bulgwang-dong Gasoline	Kim Yeon-ji of SeeYa	Singer	1	69–70	72	64.44%
14	36–39	Get Excited Eheradio	Jung Dong-ha	Singer	4	71–72, 74, 76, 78	80	63.51%
—	None	Heart Attack Cupid	Sandeul of B1A4	Singer	1	Special Live 2016 (between 79 and 80)	84	53.38%
15	40–42	Ready to Order, Popcorn Girl	Ali	Singer	3	79–80, 82, 84	86	62.88%
16	43–45	Warm Heart Robot	Shin Yong-jae of 4Men	Singer	3	85–86, 88, 90	92	64.65%
17	46	Mysticism Baby Angel	Kim Myung-hoon of Ulala Session	Singer	1	91–92	94	60.40%
18	47–49	Hoppang Prince	Hwanhee of Fly to the Sky	Singer	3	93–94, 96, 98	100	67.24%
19	50	Gangnam Swallow	Bonggu of Gilgu Bonggu	Singer	1	99–100	102	58.59%
20	51–52	Puss in Boots is Sing	Lee Hae-ri of Davichi	Singer	2	101–102, 104	106	59.76%
21	53–58	9 Songs, Mood Maker	Sohyang	Singer	6	105–106, 108, 110, 112, 114, 116	118	65.96%
22	59	0 Calories If You Taste MC Hamburger	Johan Kim	Singer	1	117–118	120	65.86%
23	60	The Sea Otter Baby Seahorse	K.Will	Singer	1	119–120	122	61.21%
24	61–62	Yeonghui	Ock Joo-hyun	Singer & Musical Actress	2	121–122, 124	126	59.93%
25	63–64	Prince of Tree Frog	Kwon Jung-yeol of 10cm	Singer	2	125–126, 128	130	63.47%
26	65–69	Red Mouth	Sunwoo Jung-a	Singer	5	129–130, 132, 134, 136, 138	140	64.42%
27	70	Gypsy Woman	Ivy	Singer	1	139–140	142	56.16%
28	71–78	The East Invincibility	Son Seung-yeon	Singer	**8**	141–142, 144, 146, 148, 150, 152, 154, 156	158	68.43%
29	79–81	Bob Ross	Han Dong-geun	Singer	3	157–158, 160, 162	164	69.26%
30	82–86	Dongmakgol Girl	Solji of EXID	Singer	5	163–164, 166, 168, 170, 172	174	67.56%
31	87–89	Giant Chestnuts of Bread	Muzie	Singer	3	173–174, 176, 178	180	59.16%
32	90–93	Eagle	Lee Hyun	Singer	4	179–180, 182, 184, 186	188	58.96%
33	94	Widow	Jang Eun-ah	Singer & Musical Actress	1	187–188	191	59.80%
34	95–97	Klimt	Haena of Matilda	Singer & Musical Actress	3	189–191, 193, 194	196	57.00%
35	98–102	Gulliver	Lee Won-seok of Daybreak	Singer	5	195–196, 198, 200, 202, 204	206	70.15%
36	103–105	Nightingale	Lee Bo-ram of SeeYa	Singer	3	205–206, 208, 210	212	66.96%
37	106–110	Jinie	Kyuhyun of Super Junior	Singer	5	211–212, 214, 216, 218, 220	222	66.33%
38	111–116	Handsome Guy	Lee Seok-hoon of SG Wannabe	Singer	6	221–222, 224, 226, 228, 230, 232	234	71.21%
39	117–121	Sweet 18	So Chan-whee	Singer	5	233–234, 236, 238, 240, 242	244	66.67%
40	122–127	Chow Yun-fat	Seungyoon of Winner	Singer	6	243–244, 246, 248, 250, 252, 254	256	67.17%
41	128	Shield	Choi Jae-rim	Musical Actor	1	255–256	258	62.86%
42	129	Pearl	Hynn	Singer	1	257–258	260	72.38%
43	130–135	Mrs. Rose	Kim Yon-ja	Singer	6	259–260, 262, 264, 266, 268, 270	272	74.29%
44	136	Hidden Objects	Kim Jung-eun	Singer	1	271–272	274	58.10%
45	137–144	Buttumak Cat	Yang Yo-seob of Highlight	Singer	**8**	273–274, 276, 278, 280, 282, 284, 286, 288	290	73.41%
46	145	Treasure Chest	Lee Young-hyun of Big Mama	Singer	1	289–290	292	73.33%
47	146	Staying Home	Park Si-hwan	Singer	1	291–292	294	61.90%
48	147–149	Barcode	Lee Joo-hyuk of Gift	Singer	3	293–294, 296, 298	300	63.27%
49	150–152	Baby Goat	Jeong Sun-ah	Musical Actress	3	299–300, 302, 304	306	63.27%
50	153–155	Emerald of May	Youme	Singer	3	305–306, 308, 310	312	62.59%
51	156	Sori-kkun	Park Min-hye of Big Mama	Singer	1	311–312	314	74.29%
52	157–158	Hwachae	Choi Jung-in	Singer	2	313–314, 316	318	66.67%
53	159	Non-face-to-face Boyfriend	Bae Doo-hoon of Forestella	Singer	1	317–318	320	61.90%
54	160–162	Mung-bean Pancake Gentleman	Johnny Lee	Singer	3	319–320, 322, 326	328	71.43%
—	None	Sibling Rebellion	Lee Ji-young of Big Mama & Lee Seung-woo of Soulstar	Singer	1	323–325	325	79.37%
55	163–166	Bear Sole	Lee Ye-joon	Singer	4	327–328, 330, 332, 334	336	80.36%
56	167–169	Winter Kid	Lee Mu-jin	Singer	3	335–336, 338, 340	342	72.11%
57	170	Dad Is a Salaryman	Park Hyun-soo of Letteamor	Singer	1	341–342	344	56.19%
58	171–174	Little Lady	Ben	Singer	4	343–344, 346, 348, 350	352	72.62%
59	175–180	Nureongi	Jeong Hong-il	Singer	6	351–352, 354, 356, 358, 360, 362	364	65.90%
60	181-185	Indian Doll	Kim Ye-ji of KARDI	Singer	5	363-364, 366, 368, 370, 371	375	76.88%
-	None	Our Friendship Is Within One Vote	Park Hyun-soo of Letteamor & Baek Hyung-hoon of Hpresso	Singer & Musical Actor	1	371-373	373	73.74%
61	186	Bachelor Kimchi	Son Jin-wook of DANGGISIO	Singer	1	376-377	379	69.49%
62	187-193	Voice Gifted From The Gods	Seomoon Tak	Singer	**7**	378-379, 381, 383, 385, 387, 389, 391	393	74.38%
63	194-197	First Place Trophy	Yoo Hwe-seung of N.Flying	Singer	4	392-393, 395, 397, 399	401	74.12%
64	198-203	Fairy Pitta	Lim Jeong-hee	Singer	6	400-401, 403, 405, 407, 409, 411	413	67.68%
65	204-207	Top Class Special Agent	Kim Jong-seo	Singer	4	412-413, 415, 417, 419	421	62.12%
66	208-211	The Midas Touch	DK of December	Singer	4	420-421, 423, 425, 427	429	66.29%
67	212-214	Incense	Sandeul of B1A4	Singer	3	428-429, 431, 433	435	61.76%
68	215-223	**The Joys And Sorrows Also Count As Rock**	**Yunmin** of TOUCHED	Singer	**9**	434-435, 437, 439, 441, 443, 445, 447, 449, 451	453	65.97%
69	224-227	Hercules	Min Woo-hyuk	Musical actor	4	452-453, 455, 457, 459	461	65.03%
70	228-232	Under The Sea	Hyolyn	Singer	5	460-461, 463, 465, 467, 469	471	71.97%
71	233-235	Carnival	Kang Seong-hee of Sinchon Blues	Singer	3	470-471, 473, 475	477	65.51%
72	236-244	**Perfume Over Flowers**	**Jung Joon-il**	Singer	**9**	476-477, 479, 481, 483, 485, 487, 489, 491, 493	495	69.54%
73	245-249	Antique Mirror	Yangpa	Singer	5	494-495, 497, 499, 503, 505	507	TBA
74	250-251	Tiger Chasing the Ghosts	Chae Bo-Hun of The VANE	Singer	2		511	
75	252-253	Piano Resounding Souls	Yuria	Musical Actress	2		515	
76	254	Gun Shooter Shoots Everything	TBA	TBA	TBA			

== List of finalists before the Final's battle ==
(The bold winner is the contestant who became the Mask King.)

Episode #	Generation #	Winner	Identity	Runner-up	Identity
Pilot	none	Self-Luminous Mosaic	Solji of EXID	Orange that wears feathers	Kim Ye-won
1–2	1	Used Two Buckets of Gold Lacquer	Luna of f(x)	Flowering Silky Fowl	Sandeul of B1A4
3–4	2	Exactly Cut in Half	Navi	Elegant Plaster Madam	Jang Hye-jin
5–6	3	Jingle Jingle Lark	Jinju	Tired Bumblebee	Sungjae of BtoB
7–8	4	CBR Cleopatra	Kim Yeon-woo	High Frequency Pair Feelers	Ailee
9–10	5	Lightning in a Dry Sky	Jo Jang-hyuk	Perfume of Mosquito Time	Im Se-joon
11–12	6	Mother said Nope to UV	Jung Eun-ji of Apink	Mount Kilimanjaro Leopard	Na Yoon-kwon
13–14	7	Take My Sword! Romantic Assassin	Kim Boa (SPICA) of SPICA	Young and Sexy Post Box	Lyn
15–16	8	King of Song Tungki	Lee Jung	JAWS Has Appeared	Tei
17–18	9	Give A Taste Of Spicy Miss Pepper	Yeoeun of Melody Day	Cotton Candy Come For Walk	Kang Min-kyung of Davichi
19–20	10	Go! Hawaii	Hong Ji-min	A Pear Drops As A Crow Flies From The Tree	Kim Seung-mi
21–22	11	Legendary Guitarman	Chen of Exo	Night Blooming Rose	Shin Hyo-beom
23–24	12	Write With Love Pencil	Sonya	Real Man Tough Guy	Lim Hyung-joo
Special Live 2015	none	Sexy Vocal Cricket	Jo Jang-hyuk	Sweet Voice Is So Sweet	Kim Boa of SPICA
25–26	13	Young and Innocent Cosmos	Gummy	Bright Full Moon	Lee Seok-hoon of SG Wannabe
27–28	14	Our Unbeatable Friend Taekwon V	Muzie	Small Snoring Tiger	Jeon Bong-jin
29–30	15	Little Wizard Abracadabra	Eun Ga-eun	Ninon Maximus Sonhador Sparta	Lee Jeong-bong
31–32	16	Come Out, Your Majesty!	Lee Hyun of 8Eight/Homme	Statue of Liberty	Dami Im
33–34	17	Amazon Cat-Girl	Cha Ji-yeon	Rainbow Romance	Younha
35–36	18	Penguin Man	Kim Ji-hwan of 2BiC	Lonely Man Leon	Oh Jong-hyuk of Click-B
37–38	19	Follow Me Samurai Admiral Kim	Lee Ji-hoon	Dad Bought Bungeoppang	G.O of MBLAQ
39–40	20	Invincible Bangpai-kite Shield	Jeon Woo-sung of Noel	Rolled Up Good Fortune	Lim Jeong-hee
41–42	21	Catch Flies Farinelli	KCM	Golden Time Of Miracle	Ryeowook of Super Junior
43–44	22	Music Captain of Our Local	Ha Hyun-woo of Guckkasten	Dream Of The Square	Jun. K of 2PM
45–46	23	Gaksul Who Came Last Year	Tei	Go Big Or Go Home	Jo Kwan-woo
47–48	24	Be Careful For Cold The Little Match Girl	Hani of EXID	A Quiet Sort Of Lightning Man	Miljenko Matijevic of Steelheart
49–50	25	Here Comes The Spring Girl	Hyolyn of Sistar	Puppet Pinocchio	Park Ji-heon of V.O.S
51–52	26	Space Agent Number Seven	Kim Bo-hyung of SPICA	You Are The Where Have Some Fun Dancing All Night	Song So-hee
53–54	27	Use Your Vote On April 13	Han Dong-geun	Bohemian Rhapsody	WoongSan
55–56	28	Express Roller Coaster	Kim Myung-hoon of Ulala Session	Can You Believe It Magic Castle	Yesung of Super Junior
57–58	29	Mysterious Wonder Woman	Yangpa	Slam Dunk	Kim Tae-woo of g.o.d
59–60	30	The Lamp Genie	Kim Kyung-ho	Life Of A Century	Kim Young-ji
61–62	31	An Out-and-Out Escape	The One	My Love Is My Bride	Bada of S.E.S.
63–64	32	The Dream Of Dolphins	Seomoon Tak	Captain Korea	Parc Jae-jung
65–66	33	Romantic The Dark Knight	Roy Kim	Female Fatale	Jo Hyun-ah of Urban Zakapa
67–68	34	Finding Your Aunt	Choi Jin-yi of Rumble Fish	Janggi and Faces	Yoon Hyung-ryul
69–70	35	Bulgwang-dong Gasoline	Kim Yeon-ji of SeeYa	Pots of Gold, Baby Demon	DK of Seventeen
71–72	36	Get Excited Eheradio	Jung Dong-ha	Rear Cattle The Altair	Kim Shin-eui of Monni
73–74	37	Mobius Strip	Lee Won-seok (singer) of Daybreak	Your Lady Ride Flower Palanquin	Hwayobi
75–76	38	Straw Bag	Kai	Seokbong	Eunkwang of BtoB
77–78	39	Robin Hood of Justice	Huh Gak	Hey Watch, You Better Sing a Song	Lee Jae-hoon of Cool
Special Live 2016	none	Heart Attack Cupid	Sandeul of B1A4	Quit Isn't in My Vocabulary, Prohibit Resignation	Lim Jeong-hee
79–80	40	Ready to Order, Popcorn Girl	Ali	Anne of Green Gables	Choi Jung-won
81–82	41	Lovers in Paris Eiffel Tower	Lee Jin-sung of Monday Kiz	Rain in the Sky Raincoat Girl	Park Jin-joo
83–84	42	Long Life of the Golden Turtle	Kim Dong-myeong of Boohwal	I Will Back Music Box	Baek A-yeon
85–86	43	Warm Heart Robot	Shin Yong-jae of 4Men	The Wizard of OZ Dorothy	Monika (singer) of Badkiz
87–88	44	Weightliftergirl Kim Mask	Kim Na-young	Challenge! Infinite Fashion King	Park Wan-kyu
89–90	45	Heart Heart Queen	Park Ki-young	Tunning! Violin Man	Kim Feel
91–92	46	Mysticism Baby Angel	Kim Myung-hoon of Ulala Session	Regional Defense Corps Desertman	Jung Seung-hwan
93–94	47	Hoppang Prince	Hwanhee of Fly to the Sky	Skip to the End, Hello	Suran
95–96	48	2017! Only The Flower Road	Lee Hyuk of Norazo	Party Queen Grasshopper	U Sung-eun
97–98	49	More Beautiful Than Flowers, Deer	DK (singer, born 1984) of December	A God of Thunderstorm, Thor	Son Jun-ho
99–100	50	Gangnam Swallow	Bonggu of Gilgu Bonggu	Girl with a Pearl Earring	Jang Hee-young
101–102	51	Puss in Boots is Sing	Lee Hae-ri of Davichi	Ballerina	Lina of The Grace
103–104	52	Kim Tak-gu, a Song Linguist	Goo Ja-myung	Miss Korea 2017 Azalea	Lisa
105–106	53	9 Songs, Mood Maker	Sohyang	Mok-dong, Yangcheon-gu, the Shepherd Boy	Bae In-hyuk of Romantic Punch
107–108	54	If You Listen to My Song, Banana	Park Seon-joo	Uncle Is Boss Chute Man	Min Young-gi
109–110	55	Devoted Singer Carnation Man	Lee Se-joon of Yurisangja	My Name Is Kimppangsun	Ahn Shin-ae (singer) of The Barberettes
111–112	56	Kang Baekho	Hwang Chi-yeul	Don't Be Dazzled by Patterns! Ladybug	Lee Ye-joon
113–114	57	The Master of Transformation 'Raccoon'	Park Hye-na	Internet Shopping Mania, Surfing Girl	Gilme of Clover
115–116	58	Voice Blue Ocean Marine Boy	John Park	Heal the World Black Jackson	Sanchez of Phantom
117–118	59	0 Calories If You Taste MC Hamburger	Johan Kim	Stingray	Kim Hwa-soo of T.△.S
119–120	60	The Sea Otter Baby Seahorse	K.Will	Power Up Popeye Eating Spinach	Joo Jong-hyuk of Paran
121–122	61	Yeonghui	Ock Joo-hyun	Fruit Ice Flakes with Syrup	Lee So-eun
123–124	62	Madonna	Kim Yon-ja	Flamingo	Jeon In-hyuk of Yada
125–126	63	Prince of Tree Frog	Kwon Jung-yeol of 10cm	Goddess Athena	Jeok Woo
127–128	64	Domestic Clock	Go Young-bae of Soran	A Blowfish Lady	Joo Hee of 8Eight
129–130	65	Red Mouth	Sunwoo Jung-a	Green Mother	Lee Ji-young of Big Mama
131–132	66	Dreamcatcher	Ben	Green Crocodile	Park Kwang-seon of Ulala Session
133–134	67	Runaway Sleigh	Kwak Dong-hyun	Ghost Bride	Shin Yeon-ah of Big Mama
135–136	68	Full of Luck	Im Do-hyuk	Woodcutter	Seungkwan of Seventeen
137–138	69	Flame Man	Kim Min-seok of MeloMance	Mistery Circle	Jo Kwon of 2AM
139–140	70	Gypsy Woman	Ivy	Vermilion Bird	Yoo Seul-gi of Duetto
141–142	71	The East Invincibility	Son Seung-yeon	Crane Guy	Hui of Pentagon
143–144	72	Drum Man	Lee Chang-min of 2AM/Homme	Matrix	Nine9 of Dear Cloud
145–146	73	La-la-land	Park Ji-yoon	Antenna	Jundoy of Lazybone
147–148	74	Gameboy	Yoo Hwe-seung of N.Flying	Scallop	JeA of Brown Eyed Girls
149–150	75	Royal Guard	Kim Jae-hwan of Wanna One	Comb-pattern Pottery	Babylon
151–152	76	Gazette Detective	Kim Chang-yeol of DJ DOC	Taj Mahal	High.D (singer) of Sonamoo
153–154	77	Picasso	Ji Se-hee	Vietnam Girl	Minseo
155–156	78	Gladiator	Eunkwang of BtoB	Open-air Bath	Ko Eun-sung
157–158	79	Bob Ross	Han Dong-geun	Lesser Panda	Ha Sung-woon of Wanna One
159–160	80	Coral Girl	Kim Soo-yeon	David Beckham	Baekho of NU'EST
161–162	81	Salvador Dalí	Woohyun of Infinite	World Cup Soccer Ball	Lee Sang-gon of Noel
163–164	82	Dongmakgol Girl	Solji of EXID	Coffee Bag	Yook Jung-wan of Rose Motel
165–166	83	Harney	Sunye of Wonder Girls	Cheetah	Park Ae-ri
167–168	84	Siren	Park Ki-young	Archery	Lee Hyun-seop
169–170	85	Longtail	Lyn	Justice Bao	Paul Potts
171–172	86	Black Swan	Moon Myung-jin	Perception Changes Boy	Kang Hong-seok
173–174	87	Giant Chestnuts of Bread	Muzie	Mi-shil	Jung Young-joo
175–176	88	Gramophone	Cheon Dan-bi	Bubblebubble	Ra.D
177–178	89	Goblin	Lee Hyuk	Sundial	Jiyoung of (Bubble Sisters)
179–180	90	Eagle	Lee Hyun	Dancheong	Lee So-jeong
181–182	91	The First Snow of the Season	Ahn Da-eun (The Ade)	London Bus	Navi
183–184	92	Magic Girl	Lisa	Ginger Man	Choi Jung-hoon of Jannabi
185–186	93	A Good Brother	Lee Tae-kwon	Sky Lantern	Shin Seung-hee of Take
187–188	94	Widow	Jang Eun-ah	Metal Boy	Ken of VIXX
189–191	95	Klimt	Haena of Matilda	Pavarotti	Park Hyun-gyu of Vromance
191–193	96	Play Guy	Kim Yong-jin (singer) of Bohemian	Aquarius	Kwon Jin-ah
193–194	97	Chang Young Sil	Ryeowook of Super Junior	Classes to Begin	Jinsil of Mad Soul Child
195–196	98	Gulliver	Lee Won-seok of Daybreak	Small Rice Cake Rice Cake	Kim Ju-na
197–198	99	Iriga	Sejeong of Gugudan	Chuno	Alex of Clazziquai
199–200	100	Right King	Hong Kyung-min	The Emperor's New Clothes	Yoo Seung-woo
201–202	101	Che Guevara	Bobby Kim	Venice	Yoon Hyung-ryul
203–204	102	The Fife Player	Car, the Garden	Lotus Lantern	Choi Hyo-in
205–206	103	Nightingale	Lee Bo-ram of SeeYa	Dumulmeori	Parc Jae-jung
207–208	104	Boiled Chicken	JK Kim Dong-wook	Chandelier	Song Ga-in
209–210	105	Asst Manager	Doyoung of NCT	Paper Airplane	Hangzoo of Rhythm Power
211–212	106	Jinie	Kyuhyun of Super Junior	Sweet Voice	Rothy
213–214	107	Sandcastle	NC.A	Petrol Station	Hyun Jin-young
215–216	108	Teurallo Pite Qus	Kang Deok-in of Jang Deok Cheol	Idol	Tae Jin-ah
217–218	109	Younggu	Kwon In-ha	Snail Bride	Baek A-yeon
219–220	110	One's Husband	Choi Sung-soo	Assorted Savory Pancakes	Jin Hae-sung
221–222	111	Handsome Guy	Lee Seok-hoon of SG Wannabe	Lizard	Shin Ji of Koyote
223–224	112	Monday Sickness	Roh Ji-hoon	Hardtack	Jeon Yoo-na
225–226	113	Green Witch	Wendy of Red Velvet	Eggplant	Choiza of Dynamic Duo
227–228	114	JJondeugi	Nilo	Dried Pollack	Sook Haeng
229–230	115	Cupid	Kim Kyung-rok of V.O.S	Broccoli	Eric Nam
231–232	116	Yu Sanseul	Lee Seung-woo of Soulstar	Roasted Chestnuts	Lee Min-gyu of Mr. 2
233–234	117	Sweet 18	So Chan-whee	Cat Man	Son Tae-jin of Forte di Quattro
235–236	118	Bruce Lee	Choi Jeong-hwan of M To M	2020 Coming Now	Park Bom
237–238	119	Simmani	Jihoo of IZ	Tapgol Park	Kim Young-min of Taesaja
239–240	120	American Hotdog	Jung Mi-ae	Rice Cake Soup	Son Ho-young of g.o.d
241–242	121	Brachiosaurus	Dayoung of Cosmic Girls	X-Generation	Heechul of Super Junior
243–244	122	Chow Yun-fat	Seungyoon of Winner	Giraffe Picture I Painted	Im Kang-sung
245–246	123	Yellow Swallowtail	I'll of Hoppipolla	Gangbyeonbuk-ro	Hong Seo-beom
247–248	124	Half Moon Prince	Michael K. Lee	Rocky	Ha Hyun-gon of Click-B
249–250	125	Hamster	Rangshow of Bubble Sisters	Flaming Friday	Kim Woo-seok of UP10TION
251–252	126	Jjamjjamyeon	Ji Won-yi	Minyo	Ha Do-kwon
253–254	127	Korean Beef 1++	Kim Ho-joong	Bonus	Yang Hye-seung
255–256	128	Shield	Choi Jae-rim	Temptation of Wife	Jo Yu-ri of Iz*One
257–258	129	Pearl	Hynn	Plum	Kim Beom-ryong
259–260	130	Mrs. Rose	Kim Yon-ja	Wine	So Yoo-mi
261–262	131	Squid	Kim Jung-min	Sergeant	Yang Dong-geun
263–264	132	Talker	Kim Seon-kyung	Disco King	Exy of Cosmic Girls
265–266	133	Haunted House	KCM	Red Tissue Paper	Han Hye-jin
267–268	134	Voice Killer	Min Woo-hyuk	Virgin Ghost	Cheetah
269–270	135	Good Job!	U Sung-eun	Suwon Wang-galbi	Kim Yang
271–272	136	Hidden Objects	Kim Jung-eun	Forbidden Love	Ahn Sung-hoon
273–274	137	Buttumak Cat	Yang Yo-seob of Highlight	Fireworks	Ricky of Teen Top
275–276	138	Bridal Mask	Kei of Lovelyz	Millstone	Hong Jam-eon
277–278	139	Ring Expedition	Ahn Ye-eun	A Match of Ssireum	Lee Dae-won
279–280	140	Mint Choco	HaEun	Vinous-throated Parrotbill	Minhyuk of Monsta X
281–282	141	Yabalabahigiya Mohaimohairura	Penomeco	Tango	Joo Da-in of JuJu Club
283–284	142	Note	Denise Kim of Secret Number	Chapssal-tteok	Muwoong of Baechigi
285–286	143	Couple Hell	Taru	Manhole	Samuel Seo
287–288	144	2021 Cheer Up, Ox!	Jeong Minseong of La Poem	Twelve Zodiac Signs	Park Nam-jung
289–290	145	Treasure Chest	Lee Young-hyun of Big Mama	Nature People	Yoo Seung-beom
291–292	146	Staying Home	Park Si-hwan	Ice	Park Seon-woo
293–294	147	Barcode	Lee Joo-hyuk of Gift	Cash Coin	Kim Shin-eui of Monni
295–296	148	Snow Duck	Na Yoon-kwon	Penthouse	Taeil of Block B
297–298	149	Mugwort	Kim Boa of SPICA	Concert	Park Sang-min
299–300	150	Baby Goat	Jeong Sun-ah	Day 1 from Today	Kim Hyun-jung
301–302	151	Ugly 6-years-old	Park Seon-joo	Yoon Sang	Go Yoo-jin of Flower
303–304	152	Pizza & Beer	Lee Jeong-kwon	First Love	Woo Yeon-yi
305–306	153	Emerald of May	Youme	Diet	Kang Seung-hee of Wink
307–308	154	It's Good!	Jeon In-hyuk of Yada	Puzzle	Kim Eun-young
309–310	155	Short Hair Girl	Lee Eun-ha	Happiness Does Not Come in Grades	Jang Hyun-chul
311–312	156	Sori-kkun	Park Min-hye of Big Mama	Shih Tzu	Sole
313–314	157	Hwachae	Choi Jung-in	Descendant of the Sun	Lee Ji-hoon
315–316	158	Watching Fire	Yoari	Bellflower	Leeds
317–318	159	Non-face-to-face Boyfriend	Bae Doo-hoon of Forestella	Nightmare	Yang Ji-eun
319–320	160	Mung-bean Pancake Gentleman	Johnny Lee	Gomusin	Sungmin of Super Junior
321–322	161	High Heels	Seo In-young	Good Night	Park Wan-kyu
323–325	none	Sibling Rebellion	Lee Ji-young of Big Mama & Lee Seung-woo of Soulstar	Brave Brothers	Kim Min-seok of MeloMance & Kim Woo-seok
325–326	162	Thunder Tiger	Kim Yong-jun of SG Wannabe	Ujang Mountain	Park Hyun-woo
327–328	163	Bear Sole	Lee Ye-joon	Undefeatable in the Matches	Kim Joo-taek of Miraclass
329–330	164	Happy Halloween	Won Mi-yeon	Ending Fairy	Kim Jae-hwan
331–332	165	Full Payment	Linzy of Fiestar	Boss, Nice Shot!	Chunja
333–334	166	Closet License	Rumble Fish	Fish Cake Soup	Im Hyung-soon of Five Fingers
335–336	167	Winter Kid	Lee Mu-jin	Favorites	Joo Byung-seon
337–338	168	Uncle	Kim Jang-soo of The Treble Clef	May a Fortune Be with You!	Kim Hye-yeon
339–340	169	Curtain Call	Hickee	Chrysanthemum Bread	Kang Joo-won of Pinocchio
341–342	170	Dad Is a Salaryman	Park Hyun-soo (singer, born 1993) of Letteamor	Old Boy	Lee Jae-sung
343–344	171	Little Lady	Ben	Rice Noodles	Kim So-yeon
345–346	172	Bucket List	Jung Yoo-kyung of Rumors	Acorn	Kang Joon-woo of Yook Joong-wan's band
347–348	173	Already 12 O'clock	Michelle Lee	Financier	Yang Ha-young
349–350	174	Champagne	Yoon Gong-joo	Mayfly	Kim Yoo-ha (singer)
351–352	175	Nureongi	Jeong Hong-il	1% of Inspiration	Yoon Hang-gi
353–354	176	Star in My Heart	Kim Seung-jin	Chicken Skewers	Shin Min-cheol of T-max
355–356	177	Olabang	MR.BOOMBOX (rapper)	Twenty-Five Twenty-One	Jun of U-KISS/UNB (group)
357-358	178	Charlie at Song Factory	Jo Hang-jo	Some	Shin Hyun-hee of Seenroot
359-360	179	Fighting Chicken	Lee Byeo-ri of Forte di Quattro	V	Park Young-mi
361-362	180	Starfish	Jeok Woo	Twisted Donut	Swan of Purple Kiss
363-364	181	Indian Doll	Kim Ye-ji of KARDI	Snow Crab after Chicken	Yoo Chae-hoon of La Poem
365-366	182	DJ Pump This Party	Ha Sung-woon	Messy Hair	Hong Ja
367-368	183	Cool Guy	Lee Solomon (singer)	Nineteen Nine	Geegooin of Rhythm Power
369-370	184	X-man	Youngji	Steamed Eggs	YEGNY
371-373	none	Our Friendship Is Within One Vote	Park Hyun-soo of Letteamor and Back Hyung-hoon of Hpresso	Acorn Sisters	Kota of Sunny Hill and Hickee
373-375	185	White Horse Riding Prince	Shin Yoo	Interview Freepass Face	Kim Ba-ul
376-377	186	Bachelor Kimchi	Son Jin-wook	In My Days Latte	Seodo (Seodo Band)
378-379	187	Voice Gifted From The Gods	Seomoon Tak	Pill Medicine	Yeji (Gyeongseoyeji)
380-381	188	Glass Mentality	Shin Yu-mi	Shin Ae-ra	Ryu Seung-ju
382-383	189	Turbo-Shooter Son Heung Min	Kwak Chang-sun	Goodnight Kiss	Wonstein
384-385	190	Coal Heater of Love	Lim Han-byul	Hot Chocolate	Choi Sang-yeop of Lucy
386-387	191	Winning The Lottery	J-Cera	Golden Rabbit	Seo Young-ju of Nerd Connection
388-389	192	Ice Skating Rink	Woody	Sister-In-Law With High Self-Esteem	Moon Hee-ok
390-391	193	Crystal Ball	Sojung of Ladies' Code	Fly High, School President	Kang Heo Dal-rim
392-393	194	First Place Trophy	Yoo Hweseung of N.Flying	Two-Horse Carriage	Kim Jae-seok of Wanted (band)
394-395	195	Round And Round	Choi Jung-chul	My Birthstone Is The KOMS Seat	Cho Yi-hyun
396-397	196	Ulsan Post Office of Zeal	Shin Ji-hu of Postman	Flower Carriage	Raina
398-399	197	Funky Fox	Horan of Clazziquai	Swing Ride	Seo Kwon of Hpresso
400-401	198	Fairy Pitta	Lim Jeong-hee	Fall 7 Times Get Up 8 Times	Eun Ga-eun
402-403	199	Swan Lake	Bae Da-hae	Rockstar	Sungmin
404-405	200	Wreath	Jeong Soo-yeon	Movie Room	Lim Yoon-sung of CNEMA
406-407	201	Dried Persimmon To The Throne	Jin Min-ho	Singing Expert	Juho
408-409	202	Fried Egg	Mose	No Way You'll Be Left Alone	Heo Hye-jin
410-411	203	Yogurt	Yun Seong	Great Catch	Gaho
412-413	204	Top Class Special Agent	Kim Jong-seo	Delivery Truck Blue	Hanbin of 4Men
414-415	205	Not Gaining Weight Into The Wild	Shin Yong-nam	Parfait	Beige
416-417	206	Ocean View	Ahn Ye-eun	Aloha	Lia of ITZY
418-419	207	I Love Singing Table Tennis	Woojae of Typhoon	Sugar-Coated Fruit Skewers	Kim Young-joo
420-421	208	The Midas Touch	DK of December	Sauna	Shin Ye-young
422-423	209	Ginkgo Tree	Bora (singer) of Cherry Bullet	Rice Sack	Noh Seung-ho of Nemesis
424-425	210	Artificial Intelligence	Kim Ji-hoon of Libelante	Morning Coffee	Jeon Cho-ah of Ran
426-427	211	Best Seller	Yuria	Take A Good Stab At It If You Don't Know	#An Nyeong
428-429	212	Incense	Sandeul of B1A4	Original Egg Bread	Cha Jin-young
430-431	213	Toy Soldier	Jayoung of Rolling Quartz	My Mind's Telepathy	Seon Woo
432-433	214	Don't Give Up	Choi Jun-yong	Heavy Snowfall	Lee Seo-yeon of fromis 9
434-435	215	The Highs And Lows Also Count As Rock	Yunmin of TOUCHED	Steamy Hot Sauna	BUMJIN
436-437	216	Fish Bread Hotspot	Jinho of Pentagon	Fluffy Roll Cake	Ahn Shin-ae of The Barberettes
438-439	217	Fire Extinguisher	Kim Dong-hyun	Hansel	Gilgu of GilguBongu
440-441	218	Captain Hook	Bae In-hyuk of Romantic Punch	Croffle	Shin Ye-joo of Isang
442-443	219	A Full Head Of Hair	Ji Se-hee	Reality Is A Circus	Hwang Woo-lim
444-445	220	Sting Like A Bee	Jeon Sang-keun	Dandelion Seed	Kim So-yeon
446-447	221	Galaxy Express 999	Kim Soo-ha	On A Winning Streak	Minseo
448-449	222	Night-Operating Palace	Lim Kyu-hyung of Crezl	Wind Turbine	Sunnie of The Barberettes
450-451	223	Lucky Box	Leenu	Precious Daughter	Shin Yu-jin of Leenalchi
452-453	224	Heracles	Min Woo-hyuk	Dutch Coffee	Nah Sang-hyun of Band Nah
454-455	225	The Queen's Elegance	kik5o	Music Teacher	Austin Kim of Fortena
456-457	226	I'll Do As You Say Hippo	Joseph of 4Men	Are You Going Bananas For Me?	Jang Han-na
458-459	227	Flower Pot	Lee Byeong-chan	I'll Give You The Company	Na-Young Jeon
460-461	228	Under The Sea	Hyolyn	Drifting Asleep Air Conditioner	Hwang Ga-ram of Pinocchio
462-463	229	You Are My Destiny	Chu Seung-yeob of Achtung	Extension Cord	Choi Hyang
464-465	230	Janggeum-i	Chowon of Lightsum	One Thousand and One Nights	K2
466-467	231	Snail	So Soo-bin	Voice Deep As A Cave	Enoch
468-469	232	Tofu	Park Hyun-gyu of Vromance	Handsome Fool General	Park Jun-ha
470-471	233	Carnival	Kang Seong-hee of Sinchon Blues	Donut	Yonghoon of ONEWE
472-473	234	Mudskipper	Vincent of Crack Shot	King of Soup	Choi Dae-chul
474-475	235	Blue-Haired Man	Jay Chang of ONE PACT	Tornado Potato	Hwang Gun-ha of RabidAnce
476-477	236	Perfume Over Flowers	Jung Joon-il	Pumpkin Sweet Potato	Stephanie
478-479	237	Christmas Candle	Jo Jeong-hyeon	Marshmallow Cookie	Shin Seong
480-481	238	Scholar Living The Diligent Life	Taehyun of DickPunks	Sunrise	EJel
482-483	239	Vacation Homework	Hong Dae-kwang	Girls' Generation	Lee Ji-hye
484-485	240	Hakuna Matata	Jooyeon of Xdinary Heroes	Round And Around	Joo Jong-hyuk
486-487	241	Blind Date	Song Ha-yea	Notting Hill	Junyfore
488-489	242	Royal Hot Pot	Jung Mi-ae	Blue Jeans	Jang Min-je
490-491	243	Bouquet	Shin Hae-sol	Sleepless Night	Im Se-jun
492-493	244	Golden Lady	Kim Ye-chan	Captain Who Dreams of a Full Ship	Bada Kim
494-495	245	Antique Mirror	TBA	Hermes	Hong Kyung-min
496-497	246	I'll Be Fine Dragon	Ahn Tae-gyu of Dragon Pony	White Grape Ade	Ma I-jin
498-499	247	Mango Bingsu	Jun Ha-young	Hong Du-kkae	Shin Gong-hoon

== Awards and nominations ==
Year	Award	Category	Recipients	Result
2015	MBC Entertainment Awards	Best Writer Award	Park Won-woo	Won
2015	MBC Entertainment Awards	Excellence Award for Music/Talk Show	Kim Yeon-woo	Won
2015	MBC Entertainment Awards	Grand Prize (Daesang)	Kim Gu-ra	Won
2015	MBC Entertainment Awards	Special Award	Shin Bong-sun	Won
2015	MBC Entertainment Awards	Rookie Award for Music/Talk Show	Kim Hyung-seok	Won
2015	MBC Entertainment Awards	Top Excellence Award for Music/Talk Show	Kim Sung-joo	Won
2015	51st Baeksang Arts Awards	Best Variety Performer	Kim Sung-joo	Nominated
2016	52nd Baeksang Arts Awards	Best Variety Performer	Kim Sung-joo	Nominated
2016	52nd Baeksang Arts Awards	Best Entertainment Program	King of Mask Singer	Won
2016	43rd Korean Broadcasting Grand Prize	Musician Category	Ha Hyun-woo	Won
2016	16th MBC Entertainment Awards	Special Award	Ha Hyun-woo	Won
2016	16th MBC Entertainment Awards	Grand Prize (Daesang)	Kim Sung-joo	Nominated
2016	16th MBC Entertainment Awards	Top Excellence Award in Music/Talk Show	Kim Sung-joo	Won
2016	16th MBC Entertainment Awards	Top Excellence Award in Music/Talk Show	Kim Gu-ra	Nominated
2016	16th MBC Entertainment Awards	PD's Award	Kim Gu-ra	Won
2016	16th MBC Entertainment Awards	Excellence Award in Music/Talk Show	Yoo Young-seok	Won
2016	16th MBC Entertainment Awards	Excellence Award in Music/Talk Show	Lee Yoon-seok	Nominated
2016	16th MBC Entertainment Awards	Excellence Award in Music/Talk Show	Solbi	Won
2016	16th MBC Entertainment Awards	Excellence Award in Music/Talk Show	Ali	Nominated
2016	16th MBC Entertainment Awards	Rookie Award in Music/Talk Show	Roy Kim	Nominated
2016	16th MBC Entertainment Awards	Rookie Award in Music/Talk Show	Shin Go-eun	Won
2016	16th MBC Entertainment Awards	Rookie Award in Music/Talk Show	Lee Sun-bin	Nominated
2016	16th MBC Entertainment Awards	Rookie Award in Music/Talk Show	Park Jin-joo	Nominated
2016	16th MBC Entertainment Awards	Program of the Year	King of Mask Singer	Nominated
2016	16th MBC Entertainment Awards	Best Teamwork Award	King of Mask Singer	Won
2017	17th MBC Entertainment Awards	Grand Prize (Daesang)	Kim Sung-joo	Nominated
2017	17th MBC Entertainment Awards	Program of the Year	King of Mask Singer	Nominated
2017	17th MBC Entertainment Awards	Top Excellence Award in Show/Sitcom Category	Kim Gu-ra	Nominated
2017	17th MBC Entertainment Awards	Top Excellence Award in Show/Sitcom Category	Kim Sung-joo	Nominated
2017	17th MBC Entertainment Awards	Excellence Award in Show/Sitcom Category	Kim Hyun-cheol	Won
2017	17th MBC Entertainment Awards	Excellence Award in Show/Sitcom Category	Choi Min-yong	Nominated
2017	17th MBC Entertainment Awards	Excellence Award in Show/Sitcom Category	Lee Yoon-seok	Nominated
2017	17th MBC Entertainment Awards	Excellence Award in Show/Sitcom Category	Shin Bong-sun	Nominated
2017	17th MBC Entertainment Awards	Rookie Award in Show/Sitcom Category	Kai	Won
2017	17th MBC Entertainment Awards	PD's Award	King of Mask Singer team	Won
2017	17th MBC Entertainment Awards	Special Award (Music Show)	Sohyang	Won
2018	18th MBC Entertainment Awards	Grand Prize (Daesang)	Kim Gu-ra	Nominated
2018	18th MBC Entertainment Awards	Program of the Year	King of Mask Singer	Nominated
2018	18th MBC Entertainment Awards	Excellence Award in Music/Talk Category	Shin Bong-sun	Nominated
2018	18th MBC Entertainment Awards	Rookie Award in Music/Talk Category	Kim Ho-young	Nominated
2018	18th MBC Entertainment Awards	Rookie Award in Music/Talk Category	Seungkwan	Won
2018	18th MBC Entertainment Awards	MC Award	Kim Sung-joo	Won
2018	18th MBC Entertainment Awards	Entertainer of the Year Award	Kim Gu-ra	Won
2019	19th MBC Entertainment Awards	Grand Prize (Daesang)	Kim Gu-ra	Nominated
2019	19th MBC Entertainment Awards	Grand Prize (Daesang)	Kim Sung-joo	Nominated
2019	19th MBC Entertainment Awards	Program of the Year	King of Mask Singer	Nominated
2019	19th MBC Entertainment Awards	Top Excellence Award in Music/Talk Category	Shin Bong-sun	Nominated
2019	19th MBC Entertainment Awards	Excellence Award in Music/Talk Category	Lee Yoon-seok	Nominated
2019	19th MBC Entertainment Awards	Global Trend Award	King of Mask Singer	Won
2019	19th MBC Entertainment Awards	Achievement Award	Kim Hyun-cheol	Won
2019	19th MBC Entertainment Awards	Achievement Award	Yoo Young-seok	Won
2019	19th MBC Entertainment Awards	Achievement Award	Yoon Sang	Won
2019	19th MBC Entertainment Awards	Entertainer of the Year Award	Kim Gu-ra	Won
2019	19th MBC Entertainment Awards	Entertainer of the Year Award	Kim Sung-joo	Won
2020	20th MBC Entertainment Awards	Program of the Year	King of Mask Singer	Nominated
2020	20th MBC Entertainment Awards	Top Excellence Award in Music/Talk Category	Kim Hyun-cheol	Nominated
2020	20th MBC Entertainment Awards	Top Excellence Award in Music/Talk Category	Shin Bong-sun	Nominated
2020	20th MBC Entertainment Awards	Rookie Award in Music/Talk Category	Kim Kang-hoon	Won
2020	20th MBC Entertainment Awards	Best Format	King of Mask Singer	Won
2021	21st MBC Entertainment Awards	Program of the Year	King of Mask Singer	Nominated
2021	21st MBC Entertainment Awards	Top Female Excellence Award	Shin Bong-sun	Won
2021	21st MBC Entertainment Awards	Popularity Award	Sandara Park	Won
2021	21st MBC Entertainment Awards	Entertainer of the Year Award	Kim Gu-ra	Won
2021	21st MBC Entertainment Awards	Entertainer of the Year Award	Kim Sung-joo	Won
