= Studio Music Hall =

- Starring: Bae Soon-tak; Kim Eana; Kim Hee-chul
- Country of origin: South Korea
- Original language: Korean
- No. of seasons: 2
- No. of episodes: 24

Production
- Running time: 60 minutes

Original release
- Network: Mnet, SK Btv
- Release: September 24, 2019 – April 7, 2020

Studio Music Hall (Korean: 스튜디오 음악당) is a South Korean show. It airs on Mnet on Thursday at 18:00 (KST).

== Format ==
Season 1

A new music talk show with high-quality music talk and life is finally unveiled.

Season 2

The show focused on introducing a wide variety of music and artists, as well as having deep talks about the current lives of artists inside the studio, and providing 'high quality' live clips of the questing singers.

== Host ==
Season 1-2:

- Bae Soon-tak
- Kim Eana
- Kim Hee-chul

== List of episodes ==
=== Season 1 ===
Season 1 (12 episodes)

Ep. #	Air Date	Guest(s)	Remarks
1	September 24, 2019	Chen (Exo)	
2	October 1, 2019	Yoon Jong-shin	Special MC: Park Jae-jung
3	October 8, 2019	Yoon Jong-shin	Special MC: Park Jae-jung
4	October 15, 2019	Daybreak	
5	October 22, 2019	Soran	
6	October 30, 2019	Kim Hyun-Chul	
7	November 5, 2019	Brown Eyed Girls	
8	November 12, 2019	The Rose	
9	November 19, 2019	Se So Neon	
10	November 26, 2019	Noel	
11	December 3, 2019	Sunwoo Jung-a	
12	December 10, 2019	Jeong Se-woon	

=== Season 2 ===
Season 2 (12 episodes)

Ep. #	Air Date	Guest(s)
1	January 21, 2020	Lucid Fall
2	January 28, 2020	Park Bom
3	February 4, 2020	Lucy
4	February 11, 2020	Lovelyz (Baby Soul, Kei, Sujeong)
5	February 18, 2020	Giriboy, DinDin
6	February 25, 2020	Song Chang-sik, Ham Chun-ho
7	March 3, 2020	Song Chang-sik, Ham Chun-ho
8	March 10, 2020	Hoppipolla
9	March 17, 2020	Jukjae, BIBI
10	March 24, 2020	PENTAGON (Jinho, Hui)
11	March 31, 2020	Oh My Girl (Hyojung, Seunghee)
12	April 7, 2020	Hynn, Stella Jang
