= Phantom Singer =

South Korean music television show

- Promotional poster for the first season
- Genre: Entertainment
- Starring: Jun Hyun-moo; Kim Hee-chul
- Country of origin: South Korea
- Original language: Korean
- No. of seasons: 4 + 1
- No. of episodes: 63

Original release
- Network: JTBC
- Release: November 11, 2016 – June 2, 2023

Phantom Singer (Korean: 팬텀싱어) is JTBC's music television program which is an audition program aiming to pick a male crossover vocal quartet. The show's season 1 was aired from November 11, 2016, to January 27, 2017, every Friday at 21:00. Season 2 was aired from August 11, 2017, to November 11, 2017, every Friday at 21:00. Season 3 was aired from April 10, 2020, to July 3, 2020, every Friday at 21:00. A special season Phantom Singer All Stars was aired from January 26, 2021, to April 20, 2021. Season 4 was airing from March 10, 2023 to June 2, 2023.

== Host ==
- Jun Hyun-moo (Seasons 1–4, All Star special)
- Kim Hee-chul (Season 1)

== Producers ==
Producer	Occupation	Seasons			
Producer	Occupation	1	2	3	4
Yoon Sang	Singer-songwriter, producer				
Kim Mun-jeong	Musical theater director				
Hye-Soo Sonn	Opera singer				
Michael K. Lee	Singer, musical actor				
Bada	Singer, musical actress, composer				
Yoon Jong-shin	Singer-songwriter				
Ock Joo-hyun	Singer, musical actress				
Kim Eana	Lyricist				
Kim Ji-yong	Classical pianist				
Park Kang-hyun	Musical actor				
Kyuhyun	Singer and musical actor				
Kim Jung-won	Pianist				

== Format ==
=== Seasons 1 to 3 ===
Contestants who successfully passed the open audition perform a chosen solo song in front of the panel of six producers and further trimmed down to 32 (or 36 in season 3). They proceed to the "1 v 1 duet" stage where contestants are paired up through a random draw and must sing a duet together while competing for a place in the next stage. The producers individually cast their votes on which contestant to keep in each pair. In each duet, the contestant with the lowest number of collective votes are considered for elimination. The producers have a meeting to decide which of the candidates should be kept in the competition and which ones should be eliminated, only announcing the eliminated candidates later; this practice would be repeated for each round of eliminations.

The remaining contestants proceed to the "duet v duet" stage. They are individually allowed to choose their duet partner and are allowed to mix together in a room for thirty minutes before deciding on their duet partner. Each duet will compete against another duet, chosen through a random draw. The panel of producers will individually score each duet out of 100, with 600 being the highest possible score. The panel decides on the candidates for elimination among the losing duets. After that, in preparation for the trio stage, the winning duets will be allowed to pick their third member among those retained contestants who had been in the losing duets. The "trio v trio" stage is conducted in the same way as the "duet v duet" stage and the top 3 winning trios will be allowed the first pick of their fourth member in preparation for the quartet stage. The trios who rank below the top 3 have to reshuffle their line-ups to form new quartets.

The first round of the quartet stage features the quartets performing their selected song and scored by the panel in the same way as the "duet v duet" and "trio v trio" stages. Only the quartet ranked first is allowed to keep all their members while one member from each of the other quartets is eliminated. The remaining contestants are then randomly grouped into quartets for the next round. Similar to the previous round, only the top ranked quartet keeps all their members while the other quartets lose a member each. The remaining twelve contestants write down the contestants they wished to be in a quartet with and undergo an interview with the panel to make their case. The panel makes the final decision based on the vocal range of each contestant and the members' ability to work together as a team.

During the first round of the final stage, the three finalist quartets perform two songs in front of the panel and a live studio audience, accompanied by a live band and chamber orchestra. Points are awarded based on votes from both the audience and the panel of producers. The very last round of the final stage features a much larger studio audience and is televised live. The quartets perform two songs each. The panel does not evaluate the quartets, who are instead awarded points based on text voting and votes from the live studio audience. The winner is decided based on the cumulative points from both rounds.

The scoring method for the "1 v 1" stage was changed in the third season. In that stage, individual producers score each contestant out of 100, with the highest score being 600. Previously, the individual producers only voted for which contestant to keep and the contestant with the fewest votes was immediately a candidate for elimination.

== Contestants ==
In seasons 1 and 2, 32 contestants were selected from the open auditions. Due to the popularity of the first two seasons, places for four more contestants were added in season 3. The majority of the contestants were professional singers or musical actors with work experience while the remaining contestants came from a variety of backgrounds and included university students (mostly voice majors) and corporate employees who were amateur singers. The contestants themselves were responsible for selecting their repertoire and producing their own performances in collaboration with music director Kwon Tae-eun, renowned for his work on JTBC audition program Superband and with K-pop songwriters and producers J. Y. Park and Bang Si-hyuk.

=== Winning contestants of Season 1 ===
Rank	Team	Members
1st place	Forte di Quattro	Go Hoon-jung, Kim Hyun-soo, Son Tae-jin, Lee Byeo-ri
2nd place	INGIHYUNSANG	Paek In-tae, Yoo Seul-gi, Kwak Dong-hyun, Park Sang-don
3rd place	Hpresso	Baek Hyeong-hun, Lee Dong-shin, Ko Eun-sung, Kwon Seo-kyung

=== Winning contestants of Season 2 ===
Rank	Team	Members
1st place	Forestella	Bae Doo-hoon, Kang Hyung-ho, Cho Min-gyu, Ko Woo-rim
2nd place	Miraclass	Julian Jootaek Kim, Kang-hyun Park, Phillip Jeong, Tain Han
3rd place	Edel Reinklang	Lee Choong-joo, An Se-kwon, Kim Dong-hyun, Jo Hyung-gyun

=== Winning contestants of Season 3 ===
Rank	Team	Members
1st place	LA POEM	You Chae-hoon, Park Ki-hun, Jeong Min-seong, Choi Sung-hoon
2nd place	RabidAnce	Kim Paul, John Noh, Ko Yeong-yeol, Hwang Gun-ha
3rd place	Letteamor	Gil Byeong-min, Kim Sung-sik, Kim Min-seok (former member as of December 9, 2022), Park Hyun-soo

=== Winning contestants of Season 4 ===
Rank	Team	Members
1st place	Libelante	Kim Ji-hoon, Jin Won, Jung Seung-won, Roh Hyun-woo
2nd place	Forténa	Austin Kim, Lee Dong-qyu, Seo Yeong-taek, Kim Seong-hyeon
3rd place	Crezl	Kim Su-in, Jo Jin-ho, Lim Kyu-hyung, Lee Seung-min

== Phantom Singer All Star ==
A twelve-episode All Star special was aired from January to April 2021. It featured the top three quartets from all three seasons. Yoon Sang and Bada, both of whom had been part of the panel of producers, returned and were joined by a "celebrity fan" panel composed of idol singers, actors and comedians. Due to COVID-19 restrictions, there was no audience in the studio; instead the "live audience" joined via live stream and the feed was projected on the screen behind to simulate the presence of a studio audience.

As this special was not a competition, there was no "knock out" format or elimination. Instead, the quartets compete against one another for the trophy and a special prize (mostly foodstuff or coupons). They were assigned seven missions to complete and the winner was named "MVP" and got to keep the trophy on their table for the entire next round until relinquishing it to the next winner. The first mission required quartet members themselves to vote for quartets other than their own while the rest counted votes only from the celebrity panel and the live audience. In the final episode, entitled "Phantom Singer Friends", all nine quartets are reshuffled based on similar song preferences and specially-formed quartets performed the selected song together in their own style.

Round 1: Quartet vs Quartet

Prior to filming, the quartets draw lots to determine the performance order. The nine celebrity panelists will vote and the quartet will be crowned "All Stars" if they receive a star (vote) from each panelist. The final ranking is determined by combining the votes of the celebrity panel, live audience and the other quartets not performing. The winning team is in bold.

#	Team	Song
1	Hpresso	"My Own Hero" original by Andy Grammer
**2**	**Miraclass**	"Mai" original by Josh Groban
3	RabidAnce	Mong Geumpo Taryung (몽금포 타령)
4	Ingihyunsang	"Sinful Passion" (Грешная страсть) original by A-Studio
5	Forte di Quattro	"Sound of Winter" (겨울소리) original by Park Hyo-shin
6	La Poem	"Breathe" (한숨) original by Lee Hi
7	Forestella	"Time in a Bottle" original by Jim Croce
8	Edel Reinklang	"A Stray Child" (미아) original by Lena Park
9	Letteamor	"Story of My Life" original by One Direction

Round 2: You and Me!

Each quartet nominates another quartet to go up against. One quartet picks a duel to join, making it a three-way battle. The winning team is in bold and the team with the most votes is named overall MVP.

#	Match-up	Team	Song
1	Hpresso vs RabidAnce	Hpresso	"Husavik" original by Will Ferrell and My Marianne
1	Hpresso vs RabidAnce	**RabidAnce**	"Ai No Corrida"
2	Letteamor vs Miraclass	Letteamor	"Beautiful Moment" (내 생에 아름다운) from The Beauty Inside OST original by K.Will
2	Letteamor vs Miraclass	**Miraclass**	"YOU" (늘 그대) original by Yang Hee-eun and Sung Si-kyung
3	La Poem vs Forte di Quattro vs Forestella	**La Poem**	"Joke's On You" from Birds of Prey OST original by Charlotte Lawrence
3	La Poem vs Forte di Quattro vs Forestella	Forte di Quattro	"Opera of the City" (도시의 Opera) original by Cho Yong-pil
3	La Poem vs Forte di Quattro vs Forestella	Forestella	"Je Suis Malade" original by Serge Lama
4	Edel Reinklang vs Ingihyunsang	Edel Reinklang	"Molitva" original by Marija Šerifović
4	Edel Reinklang vs Ingihyunsang	**Ingihyunsang**	"La Balanza" original by Valeria Lynch
Overall MVP: La Poem

Round 3: Solo Battle

Each quartet selects a member to represent their team and perform solo. The singer who earns the most number of points (calculated from live audience and celebrity votes) wins and earns the right to sit on the throne. If another singer earns more points, the previous winner will be immediately "dethroned". The singer who remains on the throne until the end is the overall MVP.

#	Singer (Team)	Song
1	Go Hoon-jung (Forte di Quattro)	"Tragic Love" (비련) original by Cho Yong-pil
2	Cho Min-kyu (Forestella)	"Balada De La Trompeta" from The Last Circus OST original by Raphael
3	Ko Eun-sung (Hpresso)	"Reste" original by Gims and Sting
4	Ahn Se-kwon (Edel Reinklang)	"Un Amore così Grande" original by Guido Maria Ferilli
5	Paul Kim (RabidAnce)	"Abyss" (심연) original song written and composed by Rabidance member Ko Yeong-yeol
6	Julian Jootaek Kim (Miraclass)	"Perdere l'amore" original by Massimo Ranieri
7	Kwak Dong-hyun (Ingikyunsang)	"This Love" (사랑이 맞을거야) original by Yoon Mi-rae
8	Choi Sung-hoon (La Poem)	"Io Ti Penso Amore" original by David Garrett ft. Nicole Scherzinger
9	Gil Byeong-min (Letteamor)	"It's Love" (사랑이야) original by Song Chang-sik
Overall MVP: Choi Sung-hoon (La Poem)

Round 4: Battle of the Seasons

The seasons face off against one another. The quartets from each season reshuffle into two quartets and two duos and face against the quartets and duos from other seasons. The winning team for each match-up is in bold. The season with the most number of wins is the overall MVP.

#	Singers	Song
1 (duo showdown)	**Season 2: Julian Kim (Miraclass) & Cho Min-kyu (Forestella)**	"Rosalina" original by Fabio Concato
1 (duo showdown)	Season 3: You Chae-hoon (La Poem) & John Noh (RabidAnce)	"Bon Voyage" (숲의 아이) original by YooA
1 (duo showdown)	Season 1: Lee Byeo-ri (Forte di Quattro) & Baek Hyung-hoon (Hpresso)	"Aspetterò" original by Il Volo
2 (quartet showdown)	Season 2: Bae Doo-hoon (Forestella), Kang Hyung-ho (Forestella), Jo Hyung-gyun (Edel Reinklang) and Tain Han (Miraclass)	"Love Runs Out" original by OneRepublic
2 (quartet showdown)	**Season 3: Kim Min-seok (Letteamor), Choi Sung-hoon (La Poem), Park Hyun-soo (Letteamor) and Paul Kim (RabidAnce)**	"You" original by A Great Big World
2 (quartet showdown)	Season 1: Park Sang-don (Ingihyunsang), Lee Dong-shin (Hpresso), Kwak Dong-hyun (Ingihyunsang) and Kim Hyun-soo (Forte di Quattro)	"To You" (너에게) original by Kim Kwang-seok
3 (duo showdown)	Season 2: Ko Woo-rim (Forestella) & Lee Choong-joo (Edel Reinklang)	"Lie Lie Lie" (거짓말 거짓말 거짓말) original by Lee Juck
3 (duo showdown)	Season 3: Ko Yeong-yeol (RabidAnce) & Jeong Min-seong (La Poem)	"An Old Love" (옛사랑) original by Lee Moon-se
3 (duo showdown)	**Season 1: Kwon Seo-kyung (Hpresso) & Go Hoon-jung (Forte di Quattro)**	"Miserere" original by Zucchero Fornaciari and Luciano Pavarotti
4 (quartet showdown)	**Season 2: Philip Jeong (Miraclass), Ahn Se-kwon (Edel Reinklang), Park Kang-hyun (Miraclass) and Kim Dong-hyun (Edel Reinklang)**	"Because We Believe" original by Andrea Bocelli
4 (quartet showdown)	Season 3: Hwang Gun-ha (RabidAnce), Kim Sung-sik (Letteamor), Park Ki-hun (La Poem) and Gil Byeong-min (Letteamor)	"Something" original by The Beatles
4 (quartet showdown)	Season 1: Baek In-tae (Ingihyunsang), Ko Eun-sung (Hpresso), Yoo Seul-gi (Ingihyunsang) and Son Tae-jin (Forte di Quattro)	"Vivere (Dare to Live)" original by Andrea Bocelli
Overall MVP: Season 2 (2 wins)

Round 5: Battle of the Genres

Each team is assigned a genre and must perform a song from that particular genre. They draw lots for the team to compete against and one pair is joined by a third team to form a three-way battle. The overall MVP is decided among the winning teams based on the most number of collective votes from the live audience and celebrity panel.

#	Match-up	Team	Song
1	Pop Diva (La Poem) vs Pop Prince (Forestella)	La Poem	"Rolling in the Deep" original by Adele
1	Pop Diva (La Poem) vs Pop Prince (Forestella)	**Forestella**	"Shape of You" original by Ed Sheeran
2	World music (Hpresso) vs Classical crossover (Ingihyunsang)	Hpresso	"Je te le donne" original by Vitaa and Slimane
2	World music (Hpresso) vs Classical crossover (Ingihyunsang)	**Ingihyunsang**	"Aria E Memoria" original by Alessandro Safina
3	1990s K-pop (Edel Reinklang) vs 2000s K-pop (Forte di Quattro) vs Audience Request (RabidAnce)	Edel Reinklang	"To Heaven" (나보다 조금 더 높은 곳에 니가 있을 뿐) original by Shin Seung-hun
3	1990s K-pop (Edel Reinklang) vs 2000s K-pop (Forte di Quattro) vs Audience Request (RabidAnce)	**Forte di Quattro**	"Road" (길) original by g.o.d
3	1990s K-pop (Edel Reinklang) vs 2000s K-pop (Forte di Quattro) vs Audience Request (RabidAnce)	RabidAnce	"Luci" original by Marchio Bossa
4	Legendary band (Letteamor) vs OST (Miraclass)	Letteamor	"Always" original by Bon Jovi
4	Legendary band (Letteamor) vs OST (Miraclass)	**Miraclass**	"Cherry Blossom Love Song" (벚꽃연가) from 100 Days My Prince OST original by Chen
Overall MVP: Forestella

Round 6: K-pop Showdown

The focus is on Korean-language pop songs and the quartets must choose songs from either the 1980s to 1990s or 2000s and later. The quartet which earns the most number of points (calculated from live audience and celebrity panelists' votes) wins and earns the right to sit on the thrones. If another quartet earns more points, the previous winner will be immediately "dethroned". The quartet who remains on the throne until the end is the overall MVP. The performance order is determined beforehand through a random draw.

#	Team	Song
1	Forte di Quattro	"I Need U" original by BTS
2	Hpresso	"I Don't Know Yet" (난 아직 모르잖아요) original by Lee Moon-se
3	Ingihyunsang	"Spark" (불티) original by Taeyeon
4	RabidAnce	"The Yoke" (멍에) original by Kim Soo-hee
5	Forestella	"Snail" (달팽이) original by Panic
6	Letteamor	"How to Avoid the Sun" (태양을 피하는 방법) original by Rain
7	Edel Reinklang	"The Tabaco Shop Lady" (담배가게 아가씨) original by Song Chang-sik
8	Miraclass	"Décalcomanie" (데칼코마니) original by Mamamoo
9	La Poem	"Don't Forget" (잊지 말아요) from Iris OST original by Baek Ji-young
Overall MVP: Edel Reinklang

Round 7: Best of the Best

The quartets have a final showdown and put on their last performances. The winning team is in bold and is decided by votes from the live audience and celebrity panel.

#	Team	Song
1	Forte di Quattro	"Dear Name" (이름에게) original by IU
2	RabidAnce	"He Lives in You" original by Lebo M and choir
3	La Poem	"Writing's on the Wall" original by Sam Smith
4	Forestella	"Inner Universe" original by Origa
5	Letteamor	"Reality" original by Richard Sanderson
6	Edel Reinklang	"An Ordinary Day" (보통날) original by g.o.d
7	Miraclass	"I'll See You Again" original by Westlife
8	**Hpresso**	"Bella ciao" (Money Heist soundtrack remix version)
9	Ingihyunsang	"Last Night" (작야/昨夜) original by Chosun Blues

Phantom Singer Friends

Before filming, the top nine most viewed and trended songs from Phantom Singer (three from each season) are chosen. Each of the 36 participants select the three songs they want to perform and the production team groups them according to their choices and vocal range. There is no winner selected.

#	Singers	Song	Season
1	Go Hoon-jung (Forte di Quattro), You Chae-hoon (La Poem), Choi Sung-hoon (La Poem) and Paul Kim (RabidAnce)	"Luna" original by Alessandro Safina	Season 1
2	Kwon Seo-kyung (Hpresso), Park Ki-hun (La Poem), Ko Yeong-yeol (RabidAnce) and Han Tae-in (Miraclass)	"Musica" original by Paolo Meneguzzi	Season 1
3	Philip Jung (Miraclass), Kim Min-seok (Letteamor), Kang Hyung-ho (Forestella) and Bae Doo-hoon (Forestella)	"Love Poem" original by IU	Season 3
4	Hwang Gun-ha (RabidAnce), Jo Hyung-hyun (Edel Reinklang), Cho Min-kyu (Forestella) and Son Tae-jin (Forte di Quattro)	"Sweet Dreams" original by Eurythmics	Season 2
5	Park Sang-don (Ingihyunsang), Ahn Se-kwon (Edel Reinklang), Kwak Dong-hyun (Ingihyunsang) and Kim Hyun-soo (Forte di Quattro)	"Flower" (꽃) original by Lee Seung-hwan	Season 2
6	Gil Byeong-min (Letteamor), Lee Choong-joo (Edel Reinklang), Kim Sung-sik (Letteamor) and Paek In-tae (Ingihyunsang)	"La Vita" original by Shirley Bassey	Season 2
7	Yoo Seul-gi (Ingihyunsang), Ko Eun-sung (Hpresso), Julian Kim (Miraclass) and Lee Dong-shin (Hpresso)	"Senza Luce" (Italian remake of "A Whiter Shade of Pale")	Season 3
8	Ko Woo-rim (Forestella), Lee Byeo-ri (Forte di Quattro), Jeong Min-seong (La Poem) and Baek Hyung-hoon (Hpresso)	"Requiem" original by Three Graces	Season 3
9	Park Kang-hyun (Miraclass), John Noh (RabidAnce), Park Hyun-soo (Letteamor) and Kim Dong-hyun (Edel Reinklang)	"Il Libro Dell'Amore" (Italian remake of "The Book of Love")	Season 1

== List of episodes and rating ==
In the ratings below, the highest rating for the show will be in red, and the lowest rating for the show will be in blue each season.

=== Season 1 ===
Season 1 (12 episodes)

Episode	Air Date	Ratings
1	November 11, 2016	1.733%
2	November 18, 2016	2.011%
3	November 25, 2016	2.678%
4	December 2, 2016	2.663%
5	December 9, 2016	2.364%
6	December 16, 2016	2.537%
7	December 23, 2016	3.043%
8	December 30, 2016	2.548%
9	July 1, 2017	4.414%
10	January 13, 2017	3.802%
11	January 20, 2017	4.604%
12	January 27, 2017	3.919%

=== Season 2 ===
Season 2 (13 episodes)

Episode	Air Date	Ratings
1	August 11, 2017	3.136%
2	August 18, 2017	4.038%
3	August 25, 2017	3.699%
4	September 1, 2017	3.913%
5	September 9, 2017	3.849%
6	September 15, 2017	3.860%
7	September 22, 2017	3.926%
8	September 29, 2017	3.821%
9	October 10, 2017	3.273%
10	October 13, 2017	4.333%
11	October 20, 2017	3.403%
12	October 27, 2017	4.093%
13	November 11, 2017	4.918%

=== Season 3 ===
Season 3 (13 episodes)

Episode	Air Date	Ratings
1	April 10, 2020	3.841%
2	April 17, 2020	4.106%
3	April 24, 2020	4.464%
4	May 1, 2020	3.877%
5	May 8, 2020	3.333%
6	May 15, 2020	4.091%
7	May 22, 2020	3.465%
8	May 29, 2020	3.843%
9	June 5, 2020	3.823%
10	June 12, 2020	3.999%
11	June 19, 2020	3.423%
12	June 26, 2020	3.492%
13	July 3, 2020	4.465%

=== Phantom Singer All Star special ===
All Star (12 episodes)

Episode	Air Date	Ratings
1	January 16, 2021	3.056%
2	February 2, 2021	2.331%
3	February 9, 2021	2.202%
4	February 16, 2021	2.242%
5	February 23, 2021	1.967%
6	March 2, 2021	2.126%
7	March 9, 2021	1.675%
8	March 16, 2021	1.738%
9	March 23, 2021	1.867%
10	April 6, 2021	1.875%
11	April 13, 2021	2.124%
12	April 20, 2021	2.061%

=== Season 4 ===
Season 4

Episode	Air Date	Ratings
1	March 10, 2023	2.925%
2	March 17, 2023	3.017%
3	March 24, 2023	2.119%
4	March 31, 2023	2.839%
5	April 7, 2023	2.275%
6	April 14, 2023	2.563%
7	April 21, 2023	2.622%
8	April 28, 2023	2.751%
9	May 5, 2023	2.973%
10	May 12, 2023	2.889%
11	May 19, 2023	2.214%
12	May 26, 2023	2.925%
13	June 2, 2023	3.149%

Note: This show airs on a cable channel/pay TV which normally has a relatively smaller audience compared to free-to-air TV/public broadcasters (KBS, SBS, MBC & EBS).

== Awards and nominations ==
Year	Award	Category	Recipients	Result	Ref
2016	JTBC Awards	Best New Entertainment Program	Phantom Singer	Won	
2017	53rd Baeksang Arts Awards	Best Entertainment Program	Phantom Singer	Nominated	

== Reception ==
The show has been credited with reintroducing the classical crossover genre to the South Korean public and popularizing it. It also increased interest and awareness of the bel canto style of singing more commonly used in classical repertoire, especially opera. The unique format of the show, where both amateur singers of different backgrounds and trained singers were randomly grouped together and given the artistic freedom to arrange and design their own performances, ensured that the performances showcased songs from a variety of genres, rather than only traditional classical crossover. Some of the contestants' performances on the show, especially in the All Star special, have been described by several media outlets as "genre-destroying".

The JoongAng Ilbo, noted in an op-ed on the ratings success of the first season, positive reception from viewers and the high quality of the performances: "It was also the moment when unknown musicians who had excellent skills but did not have a stage to sing to their heart's content were reborn as stars." The Korea Herald praised its focus on the contestants' musical skills and professional training and their preparation process prior to each performance rather than overly relying on the "entertainment factor" and "personal storylines" characteristic of most K-pop or idol-focused domestic audition or survival programs. Viewers have praised the choice of "producers" (the six-member panel) as they were selected based on industry experience and expertise, rather appearing merely to boost viewership.

== Impact and legacy ==
Commentators and industry observers noted that Phantom Singer was met with negativity from traditionalist factions of the classical music community but was enthusiastically embraced by the younger generation of classically trained singers. The enthusiasm arose from a dissatisfaction with the unspoken restrictions on what repertoire they were supposed to perform as "classical musicians" and they saw Phantom Singer as a platform to collaborate with fellow musicians and utilize their skillset without limitations. The show gained notoriety within the domestic classical music community due to the large number of classically trained singers and voice majors participating as contestants and the presence of opera singer Son Hye-soo in the panel of producers. Of the final twelve contestants from each season, more than half were classically trained. Seasons 2 and 3 notably featured contestants who had been winners or finalists at prestigious vocal music competitions abroad, held postgraduate degrees in voice or were already establishing themselves at various opera houses in Europe.

Despite the global success of The Three Tenors and Il Divo, the domestic classical music community was still largely conservative and segregationist and frowned on voice majors performing popular music due to a prevailing prejudice that classically trained singers who ventured into popular music would lose their singing skills. Such attitudes persisted into the 2000s, with tenor Park In-soo being infamously expelled from his opera company after collaborating with folk singer Lee Dong-won for the 1989 hit "Nostalgia" (향수) while musical theater veteran and crossover singer Kai, a voice major from Seoul National University and the first crossover recording artist to top the domestic classical chart and chart in the top 30 of the Gaon Album Chart, faced considerable opposition from most of his professors when he shunned a career in opera. The classically trained members of the winning teams from all three seasons have openly stated that the restrictive environment was what prompted them to audition for Phantom Singer rather than pursue a career solely in opera and classical music and welcomed the program as a much-needed platform to boost the profile of the crossover genre.

While crossover vocal groups have existed prior to Phantom Singer, the quartets formed on the show continue to enjoy much more mainstream popularity and regularly appear on weekly televised music programs such as Open Concert and Immortal Songs: Singing the Legend. According to statistics compiled by the Korea Performing Arts Box Office Information System (KOPIS), concerts by Phantom Singer participants dominated ticket sales within the "classical and opera" category for the first half of 2021, despite COVID-19 restrictions. The decrease in ticket sales of other classical musicians and groups, in contrast to those who appeared on Phantom Singer, have prompted observations that the domestic classical music industry has failed to adapt marketing and presentation strategies to attract a new generation of concert-goers or overcome the perception about classical music being "boring".
