= Jinho =

South Korean singer (born 1992)

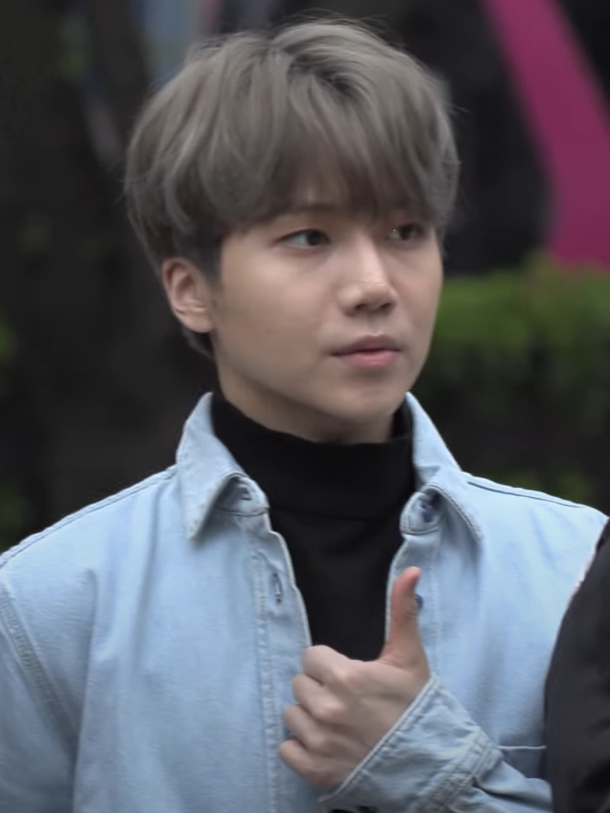
- Jinho in April 2019 during promotions for Pentagon's Genie:us mini album
- Born: Jo Jin-ho; April 17, 1992 (age 34); Bucheon, South Korea
- Other names: Jino; Mush
- Occupations: Singer; songwriter; composer; vocal coach
- Musical career
- Genres: K-pop; electronic; dance-pop
- Years active: 2010–present
- Labels: SM; Cube
- Member of: Pentagon; Crezl
- Formerly of: SM the Ballad; SM Town

Korean name
- Hangul: 조진호
- Hanja: 趙珍虎
- RR: Jo Jinho
- MR: Cho Chinho

Jo Jin-ho (Korean: 조진호; born April 17, 1992), commonly known by the mononym Jinho, is a South Korean singer, songwriter, composer, vocal coach and member of South Korean boy group Pentagon under Cube Entertainment. In 2023, he participated in the JTBC singing competition program Phantom Singer 4, where his quartet Crezl ultimately placed third and officially debuted.

He is a former SM Entertainment trainee and member of the project group SM the Ballad. After leaving SM Entertainment in 2015, Jinho became a vocal coach. Since then, he has trained Cube labelmates (G)I-dle and Yoo Seon-ho, among others.

== Early life ==
Jinho was born in Bucheon, South Korea on April 17, 1992. When he was seven, his family moved to Daejeon. At the age of 15, he lived in Qingdao, China, for eight months due to family and work before settling in Seoul.

He decided to become a singer after watching Brian McKnight and Johan Kim perform a duet of McKnight's "One Last Cry."

== Career ==
=== 2008–2014: Everysing win and SM the Ballad ===
In 2008, Jinho won first place in the SM Everysing Contest. He later became a trainee through SM Entertainment's casting system in the same year.

In November 2010, Jinho, under the name Jino, made his debut as a member of SM the Ballad alongside Super Junior's Kyuhyun, Shinee's Jonghyun, and TraxX's Jay. The group had great reception, and their debut EP Miss You reached number one on the Gaon Album Chart. He was then preparing to debut in another group, but plans fell through and the group was ultimately not formed. In 2013, he was cast in the musical Summer Snow.

=== 2015–2020: Departing SM Entertainment, debut with Pentagon and musical roles ===
In 2015, Jinho left SM Entertainment and began working as a singing tutor at Modern K Academy. Modern K Academy encouraged Jinho to audition at Cube, as their CEO has close connections with Cube Entertainment and had a hand in creating Pentagon, being in charge of talent development. In February, he was part of a vocal project group, Seorin-dong Children (서린동 아이들) with Hui and another female singer. They released a remake of Lee Won-jin and Ryu Keum-deok's 1994 classic "For All the New Lovers". The group wasn't originally supposed to consist of them, but after receiving a good response from Cube Artist Development for the recorded guide, the company decided to release it on streaming sites. In February 2016, Jinho was featured in K.Shin's song "Perception" alongside Hwang Sung-dae under the name Mush. The name was intended to be Mu$h, but he forgot to tell K.Shin to add a dollar sign instead of an 's'.

Making it through the audition process, Jinho participated in Pentagon Maker making it to the final lineup and debuting with the group on October 10, 2016.

In 2017, Jinho started a personal project titled "Magazine Ho" releasing covers in various genres and languages on the last of each month. With this project he has worked with and featured other artists such as CLC's Sorn, (G)I-dle's Jeon So-yeon, HYNN, and band mates Hongseok, Shinwon, Hui, Kino, and Yeo One.

On March 17, 2018, Jinho held his first mini live concert which is a part of his Magazine Ho cover songs project.

In September, it was announced that Jinho would star in the musical Iron Mask as Raul, the son of Athos who admires his father and dreams of becoming a royal general. The musical ran from September 13 to November 18 at the Kwanglim Art Center, Seoul. He rotated the role with musical actor, Shin Hyun-mook and actor Yoo Hyun-seok.

On December 17, 2018, Cube announced his second mini live concert "Magazine Ho Vol.2 - Ready Ho" would be on 19 January 2019 at Ilchi Art Hall, and it sold out in seconds. Members Hongseok and Kino were present as special guests during the concert.

Jinho was cast in his fourth musical, Goddess is Watching You. He played as the role of an innocent and pure North Korean soldier Ryu Soon Ho, who overcomes his trauma due to war with the belief in a goddess. The musical ran from November 14, 2019, to February 26, 2020, at the Daehangno Arts Theater in Seoul.

Jinho held his 3rd solo mini live concert, "Magazine Ho Vol.3 - Off Stage" on January 11, 2020. Due to high demand from fans, Cube Entertainment added an additional date to the concert. Jinho is set to open the first performance on January 10 to meet more fans. He sang an unreleased song, "Gravity" together with member Kino which was composed and written by Kino. Members Hui, Hongseok and Yeo One were also present as special guest. In March, Jinho appeared on Mnet's music talk show Studio Music Hall 2. He was introduced as "high note terminator" performing a duet of Kim Kwang-seok's "At About Thirty" with Hui.

=== 2021–present: Phantom Singer, Crezl, Japanese mini album ===
In March 2023, Jinho joined season 4 of Phantom Singer as a contestant. His quartet, Crezl, ended up placing third in the final round.

Jinho released his first solo mini album, titled Cho:rd, on August 28. The album is a five-track Japanese project, with the lead single "Teddy Bear".

== Personal life ==
=== Mandatory military service ===
As part of his mandatory military service, Jinho enlisted as an active duty soldier on May 11, 2020. Jinho prepared a small gift, "I'm Here", a self-composed solo song for his friends and bandmates who are running toward their dreams. Jinho explained, "When people are faced by exhaustion and discouragement, they bring back the old self of the day when they first dreamt of a dream. I hope that the voice of Pentagon's Jinho with the words 'You are doing great, so don't worry', will comfort everyone who listens to this song." The song was made before he enlisted, and only available through We:th physical album.

On September 29, 2021, Jinho's agency announced that he will be discharged from military service on November 14, 2021, without returning to the unit after his final vacation, according to the Ministry guidelines for preventing the spread of COVID-19.

== Discography ==
=== Extended plays ===
List of EPs, with selected details, peak chart positions and sales
Title	Details	Peak chart positions		Sales
Title	Details	KOR	JPN	Sales
Cho:rd	Released: August 28, 2024; Label: Cube Entertainment; Formats: CD, digital download, streaming; Track listing: 1. "Goodbye with You"; 2. "Teddy Bear"; 3. "僕の君へ ～僕たちの瞬間～" (JPN) or "Dear Precious One, Our Shimmering Days" (KOR); 4. "Over"; 5. "Marry-Go-Round" (JPN) or "Bad Criminal" (KOR)	12	19	KOR: 16,446; JPN: 4,391

=== Singles ===
Title	Year	Album
As lead artist
"Goodbye With You"	2024	Cho:rd
Teddy Bear	2024	Cho:rd
Collaborations
"시작되는 연인들을 위해" (서린동 아이들 (with Hui & Yongjoo)	2015	시작되는 연인들을 위해
"Happy Winter Song" (with Hui)	2016	United Cube Project Part 2
"You Are" (with Hui, Hongseok, Shinwon, Yeo One, Yan An, Kino)	2016	Pentagon
"Thank You" (with Hui)	2017	Ceremony
"All My Heart" (진심) (with Hui)	2019	MBC What Is the First Place? Part 1
As featured artist
"Perception" (K.Shin feat. Hwang Sung-dae, Mush (Jinho as Mush)	2016	Part.1: Seed of Truth
"Always" (Jung Il-hoon feat. Jinho)	2018	Big Wave
Soundtrack appearances
"Just a Little Bit More" (조금만 더) (with Rothy)	2018	What's Wrong with Secretary Kim OST
"Miss U" (with Hui and Kino)	2019	On the Campus OST
"How Can I Do" (with Hui and Wooseok)	2019	Welcome to Waikiki 2 Part 4 OST
"A-Ha!" (with Kino)	2022	User Not Found OST
"Keep This Moment" (이 순간을 간직해)	2022	Love All Play OST

=== Writing and production credits ===
All credits are adapted from the Korea Music Copyright Association, unless stated otherwise.

Year	Artist	Song	Album	Lyrics		Music	
Year	Artist	Song	Album	Credited	With	Credited	With
2016	K.Shin (feat. Hwang Sung-dae, Mush)	"Perception"	Part.1 : Seed Of Truth	No	—N/a	Yes	K.Shin, Hwang Sung-dae, Moodin, Soriheda
2016	Pentagon	"Find Me" (나를 찾아줘)	Non-album release	Yes	E'Dawn	Yes	E'Dawn, Hongseok, Park Jae Sun, Tiger JK
2016	Pentagon	"UP"	Non-album release	No	—N/a	Yes	Yeo One, Shinwon, Yan An, Wooseok
2017	Pentagon	"To Universe" (소중한약속)	Ceremony	Yes	Kang Dong-ha, E'Dawn, Yuto, Wooseok	Yes	Kang Dong-Ha
2017	Pentagon	"One More Night" (오늘까지만)	Demo 01	Yes	Ferdy, E'Dawn, Adachi Yuto, Wooseok	Yes	Ferdy
2017	Pentagon	"All Right"	Demo 02	Yes	Son Young-jin, E'Dawn, Adachi Yuto, Wooseok	Yes	Son Young-jin
2018	Pentagon	"Think About You" (생각해)	Positive	Yes	Kang Dong-ha, E'Dawn, Adachi Yuto, Wooseok	Yes	Kang Dong-Ha
2019	Pentagon	"Can't forget (忘れられない) "	Shine	Yes	藤田リュウジ	Yes	Kang Dong-Ha
2019	Pentagon	"Round 1" (Bonus track)	Genie:us	Yes	Hui, Hongseok, Shinwon, Yeo One, Yanan, Yuto, Kino, Wooseok	Yes	Hui, Hongseok, Shinwon, Yeo one, Yanan, Yuto, Kino, Wooseok, MosPick
2019	Pentagon	"SUMMER!"	Sum(me:r)	Yes	Wooseok	No	—N/a
2019	Pentagon	"Round 2" (Bonus track)	Sum(me:r)	Yes	Hui, Hongseok, Shinwon, Yeo one, Yanan, Yuto, Kino, Wooseok	Yes	Hui, Hongseok, Shinwon, Yeo one, Yanan, Yuto, Kino, Wooseok, MosPick
2020	Pentagon	"Talk"	Universe: The Black Hall	Yes	Wooseok	No	—N/a
2020	Glay (feat. Pentagon)	"I'm loving you" (Korean Ver.)	Non-album release	Yes	Wooseok, Kubo Takuro	No	—N/a
2020	Pentagon	"I'm Here" (Jinho solo)	WE:TH	Yes	—N/a	Yes	—
2022	Pentagon	"Feelin' Like"	In:vite U	Yes	HAEE, Kino, Wooseok	No	—N/a

== Filmography ==
=== Television series ===
Year	Title	Role	Notes
2017	Hello, My Twenties! 2	Cameo	member of idol group Asgard

=== Variety shows ===
Year	Title	Role	Notes	Ref.
2016	Pentagon Maker	Contestant		
2019	King of Mask Singer	Contestant	as "Young Master," episode 190	
2019	Rewriting The Chart Show, Number 1 Now Is?	Contestant		
2020	Studio Music Hall 2	Contestant	with Hui, episode 10	
2023	Phantom Singer	Contestant	Season 4	
2024	King of Mask Singer	Contestant	as "Fish Bread Hotspot," episodes 436-437	

=== Theater ===
Year	Title	Original title	Role	Notes
2013–2014	Summer Snow		Lee Suhyun	
2017–2018	All Shook Up	올슉업	Dean Hyde	Korean Ver.
2018	Iron Mask	아이언 마스크	Raul	
2019–2020	Goddess is Watching You	여신님이 보고 계셔	Ryu Soon Ho	
2022	Midnight Sun	태양의 노래	Jung Ha-ram	
2022	Ocean	오션스	Sky (Halbo)	

== Concerts ==
Date	City	Country	Events	Venue	Attendance	Ref.
March 17, 2018	Seoul	South Korea	Mini Live Magazine Ho	Hana Tour V Hall		
January 19, 2019	Seoul	South Korea	Mini Live Magazine Ho Vol.2 - Ready Ho	Ilchi Art Hall		
January 10, 2020	Seoul	South Korea	Mini Live Magazine Ho Vol.3 - Off Stage	Nodeul Live House	900	
January 11, 2020	Seoul	South Korea	Mini Live Magazine Ho Vol.3 - Off Stage	Nodeul Live House	900	

== Awards and nominations ==
Year	Award	Category	Result	Ref.
2019	I'm CELUV's 100th Special Awards	Fatal Attraction (손해배상)	Won	
