= Crezl =

South Korean crossover musical group

Crezl 크레즐
- Origin: Seoul, South Korea
- Genres: Crossover - pop, classical, musical theatre, Korean traditional music, rock, jazz
- Years active: 2023–present
- Label: Cheetah Company (CHXXTA)
- Members: Jo Jin-ho; Kim Su-in; Lee Seung-min; Lim Kyu-hyung

Crezl (Korean: 크레즐; RR: keurejeul) is a South Korean crossover male vocal quartet formed through the JTBC singing competition program, Phantom Singer 4, which aired in 2023. They officially debuted as a group after advancing to the final round of competition. The name, Crezl, is a portmanteau of the English word "creative" and the Korean word "즐겁다; jeulgeopda" meaning "joyful/fun" to reflect their aspirations to enjoy and create music that displays the unique qualities and personalities of the four members who come from different music genres and share that joy with those that hear their music.

The group consists of K-pop idol singer Jo Jin-ho, Korean traditional music artist Kim Su-in, classical vocalist Lee Seung-min, and musical actor Lim Kyu-hyung. Across the four seasons of Phantom Singer show, Crezl was notable as crossover vocal quartet incorporating elements of pop, musical theatre, western classical, and Korean traditional music called "국악; gugak".

== History ==
=== Background ===
Before appearing in Phantom Singer 4, Jo Jin-ho was active as the main vocalist in the K-pop group, Pentagon. He made history by becoming the first K-pop idol to advance to the final round of the Phantom Singer 4 competition. Kim Su-in was performing as a Korean traditional musical actor in the National Changgeuk Company (The Merchants of Venice) while taking part in Phantom Singer 4. Lee Seung-min was a student at the famed Department of Vocal Music at Seoul National University at the time of the show's production. Lim Kyu-hyung also continued to perform as a musical actor in productions (Hero, William and William's Williams) while he participated in the program.

=== 2023: Phantom Singer 4 ===
While on Phantom Singer 4, the group differentiated itself from the others through a diverse spectrum of song choices and musical elements, while showcasing a dynamic stage presence. The first round brought together Jo Jin-ho and Kim Su-in with another contestant ('rocker' and financial advisor, Kim Kwang-jin) to an unconventional pop/rock/gugak rendition of Charlie Puth's "Dangerously" that elicited high praise from the producers. Lee Seung-min and Kim Su-in then joined forces in the second duet round to perform a pop song, Bishop Briggs' "River", that raised the bar in their willingness to experiment, producing an unexpected and never-before-seen collaboration of western classical vocals (parlando) with Korean traditional music vocals, introducing also a version of gugak rap and beat-box. In the trio round, with the addition of Lim Kyu-hyung, the group revived a beloved old-school pop song, "Hwang Jini", from legendary Korean pop singer Cho Yong-pil. Kim Su-in's powerful and unique tonal vocals were used once again to give the song a different color and drama. Lim Kyu-hyung, having excelled in performances that range from pop and rock to French chanson, earned from the producers the moniker 'vocal genius' for his musical versatility and expression. The trio, due to their individual schedules and obligations outside of the program, began to room with each other, to use whatever downtime they had to devote to developing their music and performances, which is said to have helped build a strong bond among the members. Crezl welcomed Jo Jin-ho as its fourth and final member, affectionately nicknamed 'angel' Jo by one of the producers because of his signature high notes reminiscent of a 'heavenly angel'.

As reflected in the four songs of the final round of competition, Crezl members expressed that their greatest asset was that they all come from different musical backgrounds, each with their own strengths. Crezl distinguished itself by covering pop music from all parts of the world and languages (Korean, English, Spanish) while using the stage to great effect to emit drama, personality, and fun in their performances. Their rendition of Stevie Wonder's "Faith" in the final round, which combined vocal range, choreography, and overall musical performance, resulted in the highest high-low scores (99-98 out of 100) of all time. Blackpink's "Kill This Love", also performed in the finals, was the first K-pop idol song to be covered in Phantom Singer finals history, especially in its reinterpretation with Korean traditional music. The performance was lauded with a standing ovation from the audience. They also performed Mexican pop song, Jesse & Joy's "¡Corre!", and Michael Bublé's "Higher" in the finals. While Crezl placed third in the overall competition, critics noted the potential of the group to establish a new frontier, to create their own genre of music.

List of performances by Crezl members on Phantom Singer 4
	Jo Jin-ho	Lim Kyu-hyung	Kim Su-in	Lee Seung-min
Individual qualifying round	"Waving Through A Window" (by Ben Platt)	"Always Remember Us This Way" (by Lady Gaga)	"Ssukdaemeori" (쑥대머리)	"Se ho da dirla avrei molto piacere" (from Rossini's Il turco in Italia)
Round 1: Position battle	"Dangerously" (by Charlie Puth)	"Hey Child" (by X Ambassadors)	"Dangerously" (by Charlie Puth)	"È mezzanotte" (by Sal Da Vinci)
Round 2: Duet contest	"I Can't Feel My Face" (by The Weeknd)	"Comme toi" (by Jean-Jacques Goldman)	"River" (by Bishop Briggs)	
Round 3: Trio contest	"Ali di libertà" (by Andrea Bocelli)	"Hwang Jini" (황진이) (by Cho Yong-pil)		
Round 4: 1st quartet competition	"Viva la dolce vita" (by Patrizio Buanne)	"If Only My Flower Were to Bloom" (나 하나 꽃 피어)		
Round 5: 2nd quartet competition	"Winter Sleep" (겨울잠) (by IU)		"Bloody Mary" (by Lady Gaga)	"Never Change" (by Lukas Graham)
Finals: 1st round	"¡Corre!" (by Jesse & Joy) and "Faith" (by Stevie Wonder)			
Finals: 2nd round	"Kill This Love" (by Blackpink) and "Higher" (by Michael Bublé)			

=== July 2023–present ===
Crezl took part in a national tour of the Phantom Singer 4 Gala Concert series with the other two finalist teams across nine cities throughout South Korea from July 14, 2023 to September 10, 2023. Following the end of Phantom Singer-related activities, Crezl performed at the Samrangseong History and Culture Festival (삼랑성역사문화축제) on October 7, 2023 and the Blue House Outdoor Concert (청와대 야외 콘서트) on October 8, 2023.

On November 29, 2023, Cheetah Company (also known as CHXXTA) announced that Crezl joined the agency as its newest artists, citing that they saw "infinite potential" in the group. As a gift to long-awaited fans, Crezl held its first fan meeting concert at Sogang University's Mary Hall Grand Theater on December 23 and 24, 2023. Crezl also performed as a special guest on the KBS New Year's Eve annual live broadcast counting down to the new year on the "2024 Welcome a New Day" (2024 새날마중) program.

Crezl began 2024 with a special performance at the National Orchestra of Korea 2024 New Year Concert (국립국악관현악단 2024 신년 음악회) on January 12, 2024. They held a joint concert with their fellow Phantom Singer 4 finalist team, Forténa, at the Kyung Hee University Wonderland Theatre Peace Hall (경희대학교 평화의전당) on January 27-28, 2024. The following month, they held a joint concert with another crossover group, RabidAnce, the second place winner from Phantom Singer 3, titled "2024 RabidAnce x Crezl <Suddenly Festival>" at the Goyang Aram Nuri Arts Center on February 18, 2024, Ansan Arts Center on February 24, 2024, and KBS Changwon Hall on March 10, 2024.

On April 11, 2024, Crezl released their first mini-album Cre: 㘉, achieving platinum status through more than 10,000 copies sold on pre-orders. The title song, "Forbidden Love", was composed by member Lee Seung-min with Kim Su-in contributing on the lyrics. In the same month, Crezl held their first solo concert [Backstage: Rough] at the Seoul KEPCO Arts Center and Daegu Chunma Art Center Chamber Hall. A special performance concert was also held at the Cheongju Arts Center on May 25. In addition to new covers, songs from their recently released mini-album were performed at the concert.

Crezl continues to appear in various online, radio, and broadcast programs, including on MBC M Show Champion on July 17, 2024 to perform their title song "Forbidden Love." A fan concert concluded on August 3-4, 2024 at Dongduk Women's University Centennial Memorial Hall in Seoul, where new covers were added, including duet performances of a traditional Korean song "찬비가" and "We Both Reached for the Gun", a number from the musical Chicago, which drew enthusiastic responses from the audience. A collaboration concert titled "The Masterpiece" with fellow crossover groups, Forténa, Libelante, and RabidAnce, from Phantom Singer 3 and 4 was also held at the Inspire Arena in Incheon on August 10-11, 2024.

== Members ==
- Jo Jin-ho (조진호) – pop vocal / tenor
- Kim Su-in (김수인) – Korean traditional music vocal / tenor
- Lee Seung-min (이승민) – classical vocal / baritone
- Lim Kyu-hyung (임규형) – leader, musical vocal / tenor

== Musical style ==
The members of Crezl have stated that their diverse musical backgrounds and experiences lend themselves to a broader perspective and freedom to experiment with different musical styles, and that they hoped that Crezl might be eventually used to describe similar sounds to that of their music.

The vocal versatility and musicality of each Crezl member provide a wide range of possible repertoire for the group, as shown in the diverse performances (pop, ballad, jazz, rock) on the Phantom Singer 4 program. Lee Seung-min's smooth, warm baritone vocalization provides a low register anchor, while Kim Su-in's soulful tonal voice characteristic of Korean traditional music gives the group's sound a distinctive edge and color. Lim Kyu-hyung and Jo Jin-ho's vocals fill the spectrum in between with melodic harmonies, punctuated with dramatic high-pitch notes. Lastly, Crezl's live performances have been noted as a strength of the group, which were in full display during the final round of the Phantom Singer 4 competition. Throughout the airing of the program, the producers opined that a group as diverse as Crezl is the reason that the show was created – to showcase music that crosses the boundaries of genres.

In an interview, Lim Kyu-hyung described themselves as a group "like a palette with four very different colors." The members also noted that having a K-pop idol, Jo Jin-ho, as a member of the group would help their unique blend of music to appeal to a broader mainstream and global audience.

== Discography ==
=== Extended plays ===
Title	Details	Peak chart positions	Sales
Title	Details	KOR	Sales
Cre: 㘉	Released: April 11, 2024; Label: Cheetah Company; Formats: CD, download, streaming	15	KOR: 16,162
HAKUNAMATA:舵	Released: January 7, 2025; Label: Cheetah Company; Formats: CD, download, streaming	32	KOR: 4,824

=== Singles ===
Title	Year	Peak chart positions	Album
Title	Year	KOR Down.	Album
"Forbidden Love"	2024	160	Cre: 㘉
"Hakuna Matata"	2025	93	Hakuna Matata
"Lady Marmalade"	2025	-	Non-album single

== Concerts ==
Title	Date(s)	Cities	Ref.
Phantom Singer 4 Gala Concert (with Libelante and Forténa)	July 14 – September 10, 2023	Seoul, Daejeon, Daegu, Incheon, Gwangju, Busan, Cheongju, Jeonju, Seongnam	
National Orchestra of Korea 2024 New Year Concert (with National Orchestra of Korea)	January 12, 2024	Seoul	
Wonderland Theatre 2024 Concert (with Forténa)	January 27, 2024	Seoul	
2024 RabidAnce x Crezl <Suddenly Festival> (with RabidAnce)	February 18 – March 10, 2024	Goyang, Ansan, Changwon	
Crezl 1st Concert [Backstage: Rough]	April 13 – 14, 2024	Seoul	
Crezl 1st Concert [Backstage: Rough]	April 27 – 28, 2024	Daegu	
Crezl Special Performance Concert	May 25, 2024	Cheongju	
Crezl 'Dive into Crezl' Fan Concert	August 3-4, 2024	Seoul	
<The Masterpiece> Concert (with Forténa, Libelante, RabidAnce)	August 10-11, 2024	Incheon	
