= La Poem =

South Korean vocal group

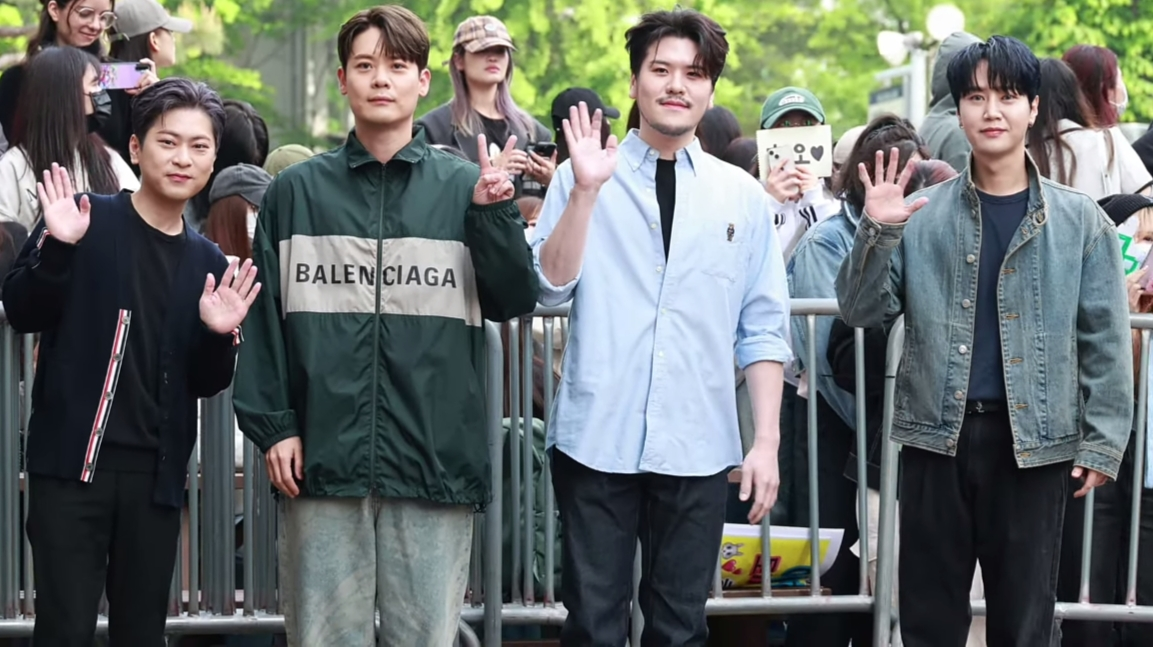
- La Poem in April 2024

Background information
- Origin: South Korea
- Genres: Crossover; pop; classical
- Years active: 2020–present
- Label: Drama House
- Members: Chaehoon You; Kihun Park; Minseong Jeong; Sunghoon Choi
- Website: Official Instagram

La Poem (Korean: 라포엠) is a South Korean male crossover vocal group, composed of four classically trained singers Chaehoon You, Kihun Park, Minseong Jeong, and Sunghoon Choi. La Poem was formed in July 2020 via a reality audition TV show Phantom Singer Season 3 (Phantom Singer 3), and has been actively performing in various venues (e.g., concerts, TV shows, music festivals, openings of various awards, the opening ceremony of Korean Series, KBO league).

== Formation ==
La Poem is a male crossover quartet originated from a TV show Phantom Singer 3, which was aired on a Korean TV network jtbc from April 10 to July 3, 2020. The TV show auditions male singers who are trained mostly in classical music and musical theaters, and selects three teams of a quartet to compete in the end. Having two rounds of competition, La Poem won by most votes of viewers of the show on July 3, 2020, debuting as a crossover music group. The group's name La Poem came from a combination of the French word "la bohème" and the English word "poem", signifying the group's desire to sing freely poem-like songs that can remain in everyone's heart.

== Members ==
La Poem is composed of four classically trained singers: two tenors, Chaehoon You and Kihun Park; one baritone, Minseong Jeong; and one countertenor, Sunghoon Choi. The two tenors have different vocal types as Chaehoon is considered a leggero tenor and Kihun a spinto tenor. The fact that the countertenor Sunghoon's vocal range is equivalent to that of a female singer adds unique flavors to their singing compared to typical male vocal quartets.

Each member studied vocal music in high school and university, sharing similar training backgrounds. The classical backgrounds of the members provide them with extended opportunities to perform operatic songs as well as pop music.

=== Chaehoon You ===
Chaehoon went to Hanyang University in Seoul, Korea, following Pohang High School of Arts located in his hometown Pohang, Korea. He was one of top students at the entry of the university. Yet, he tried hard to make his way out to popular music markets rather than classical music theaters. After graduating from the university, he continued to sing on many stages and joined popera groups Awesome and Ekklesia, but did not make any noticeable marks in the market. Chaehoon You's celebrity status, albeit quite limited, finally took off after he sang Il Mondo at his first appearance on the TV show Phantom Singer 3. He has gained a lot of ardent supporters and fans since then.

On August 13, 2021, Culture Concert Nanjang announced that Chaehoon You would be its 9th host. Culture Concert Nanjang, organized by Gwangju MBC, is a music show in which talented singers are invited to perform live. La Poem made their album Scene#1 debut through a Nanjang concert.

=== Kihun Park ===
Kihun went to Seoul National University in Seoul, Korea, following Busan High School of Arts located in his hometown Busan, Korea. He graduated from the university as one of top students. He won many awards from many competitions domestically and internationally while being a university student. In particular, he was awarded Deuxieme Grand Prix (i.e., a runner-up) at the 51st International Singing Competition of Toulouse held in 2016. At that time, he was only 21 years of age. Kihun Park is the youngest member of La Poem and introduces himself as a bulgot (meaning "flame") tenor as his fiery vocal power signifies.

=== Minseong Jeong ===
Minseong went to Yonsei University in Seoul, Korea, following Incheon High School of Arts in Incheon, Korea. He also won many awards from many domestic singing competitions (e.g., the grand prize at Deagu singing competition in 2019). At the time of preliminary auditions of Phantom Singer 3, he had just started more advanced singing training in Folkwang University of the Arts in Germany. As the audition took place in Germany, he went for it and was selected as one of thirty-six competitors. He initially wanted to take a leave of absence while participating in the show recorded in Korea. As the school did not allow it, he decided to drop and returned to Korea to compete.

=== Sunghoon Choi ===
Sunghoon went to Korea National University of Arts in Seoul, Korea, following Gyeongbuk High School of Arts located in his hometown Daegu, Korea. Moving to France, he continued his singing study at City Conservatory of Paris for two years and at Centre of Baroque Music Versailles thereafter. He then moved to Switzerland and earned a master's degree at Geneva University of Music. In living in Europe, Sunghoon Choi participated in many competitions, some of which awarded him grand prizes (e.g., Prix D'honneur from Leopold Bellan International Competition in 2015). He also performed on many stages as a soloist and an opera singer until his audition for Phantom Singer 3 held in London was successful and had to return to Korea to compete with the 36 competitors.

== Discography ==
=== Extended plays ===
Title	Details	Peak chart positions	Sales
Title	Details	KOR	Sales
Scene#1	Released: December 2, 2020; Label: Moss Music, Dreamus Company; Formats: CD, digital download; Track listing: 1. "Amigos Para Siempre"; 2. "Crescent"; 3. "Gleamy Night"; 4. "Rain That Drops First Time"; 5. "Fantasy" (with Danny Koo); 6. "La Tempesta"; 7. "Dear My Dear"; 8. "O Holy Night" (CD bonus)	3	KOR: 33,871
Eclipse (Trilogy III. Vincere)	Released: December 7, 2021; Label: Moss Music, Dreamus Company; Formats: CD, digital download; Track listing: 1. "Waltz in Storm"; 2. "Half Moon"; 3. "Oasis"; 4. "Love Serenade"; 5. "Sunshine"; 6. "Full Moon"	3	KOR: 17,857
The Alchemist	Released: March 8, 2023; Label: Studio Jam, Kakao Entertainment; Formats: CD, digital download	10	KOR: 26,547
Poem (시·詩·Poem)	Released: October 26, 2023; Label: Studio Jam, Kakao Entertainment; Formats: CD, digital download	15	KOR: 17,314
Alive	Released: January 20, 2026; Label: Drama House, Kakao Entertainment; Formats: CD, digital download	20	KOR: 10,763

=== Single albums ===
Title	Details	Peak chart positions	Sales
Title	Details	KOR	Sales
Mirror	Released: April 24, 2024; Label: Studio Jam, Kakao Entertainment; Formats: CD, digital download	14	KOR: 14,966

=== Singles ===
Title	Date	Album
As lead artist
"Waltz In Storm"	June 23, 2021	Trilogy I. Dolore
"Half Moon"	June 23, 2021	Trilogy I. Dolore
"Oasis"	September 15, 2021	Trilogy II. Speranza
"Love Serenade"	September 15, 2021	Trilogy II. Speranza
"Sunshine"	December 7, 2021	Eclipse (Trilogy III. Vincere)
"Full Moon"	December 7, 2021	Eclipse (Trilogy III. Vincere)
As featured artist
"Answer: Ode to Joy"	December 10, 2021	Ateez Zero: Fever Epilogue
Soundtrack appearances
"Lacrimosa"	March 21, 2021	Vincenzo OST Part 4

=== Singles (cover versions) ===
Title	Date	Album	Original Singer
"Nelle Tue Mani"	June 27, 2020	Phantom Singer 3 Episode 9	Andrea Bocelli
"Shining"	June 27, 2020	Phantom Singer 3 Episode 9	Jaurim
"Mademoiselle Hyde"	July 7, 2020	Phantom Singer 3 Episode 10	Lara Fabian
"The Rose"	July 7, 2020	Phantom Singer 3 Episode 10	Bette Midler
"Star, Wind, Sunlight, and Love"	August 22, 2020	Immortal Songs: Singing the Legend -- Kim Jong-kook & Turbo	Kim Jong-kook
"Breathe"	February 3, 2021	Phantom Singer All Stars Episode 2	Lee Hi
"Joke's on You"	February 10, 2021	Phantom Singer All Stars Episode 3	Charlotte Lawrence
"Rolling in the Deep"	March 10, 2021	Phantom Singer All Stars Episode 7	Adele
"Don't Forget Me"	April 7, 2021	Phantom Singer All Stars Episode 10	Baek Ji-young

== Filmography ==
=== Reality TV show ===
Date	Network	Title	Note
2020 (April 10 – July 3)	JTBC	Phantom Singer 3	Winner
2020 (August 22)	KBS	Immortal Songs: Singing the Legend	Won in two successive matches
2021 (January 26 – April 20)	JTBC	Phantom Singer All Stars	Earned MVP awards in Round 2 and 3
2021 (May 27)	Mnet	Kingdom: Legendary War	Featured for Ateez's Answer: Ode to Joy
2023 (March 17)	TVING	Webtoon Singer	Featured with The God of High School, combining webtoon and performing with extended reality, this song was used by Blackpink in Shut Down, teammate with Yoo Se-yoon in the 5th episodes and won

== Concerts and Tours ==
=== Phantom Singer 3 Gala Concert Tour (August - November, 2020) ===
Three quartets that had made it to the final competitions of the show Phantom Singer 3 had a concert tour together after the show was over. Three quartets including La Poem performed the songs that were sung by the singers during the TV show, with some new songs added to the list.

Date	City	Venue
August 15 to 17	Seoul	The Peace Hall, Kyung Hee University
August 22	Daegu	EXCO Exhibition Hall, Level 1
October 17	Ilsan	KINTEX Exhibition Center 1, Hall A
October 24	Busan	BEXCO Exhibition Center 1, Hall 1
November 13 to 14 (encore)	Seoul	The Peace Hall, Kyung Hee University

=== Love Poem Concert (November 18, 2020) ===
A classical vocal concert was held with Bass Sonn, Hey-Soo in Seoul Arts Center, Seoul.

=== Phantom Singer All Stars Gala Concerto Concerts (May 28 – June 6, 2021) ===
Nine quartets formed via Phantom Singer 1-3 got together and had a series of concerts in Olympic Hall, Seoul Olympic Park to continue the momentum of the TV show Phantom Singer All Stars. Due to time and space limits, three of the 9 quartets performed together on the same stage. La Poem performed on three different dates, and its detailed timetable is shown below.

Date	Quartet	Note
May 29	Hpresso (season 1), Miraclass (season 2), La Poem (season 3)	Phantom Singer 1–3
June 4	La Poem, Rabidance, Letteamor	Phantom Singer 3
June 5	La Poem, Rabidance, Letteamor	Phantom Singer 3

=== La Poem's 1st Concert <Scene#1> Tour (April 10 – August 15, 2021) ===
This is La Poem's first concert tour after its formation in July 2020. The tour was initially scheduled to begin in Seoul on March 27 to 28, 2021, but it was cancelled due to COVID-19 related social distancing measures. For this reason, La Poem's first concert was held in Busan (KBS Busan Hall) on April 10 and 11. Following the concert, the tour stopped for a while. As June began, concert venues were successively announced, the tour resuming in Ulsan, continuing in Suwon, Cheongju, Seongnam, Daegu, and finishing in Seoul.

Date	City	Venue
April 10 to 11	Busan	KBS Busan Hall
June 26 to 27	Ulsan	KBS Ulsan Hall
July 10 to 11	Suwon	Gyeonggi Arts Center
July 17 to 18	Cheongju	Cheongju Arts Center
July 24 to 25	Seongnam	Seongnam Arts Center
August 7 to 8	Daegu	Keimyung Arts Center
August 13 to 15	Seoul	Olympic Hall, Olympic Park

=== 2021 Great Concert Series (November 12 to 13, 2021) ===
La Poem was invited to Great Concert Series for year 2021 hosted by Sejong Center. The concert was held in two consecutive days in Sejong Grand Theater in Sejong Center, Seoul, Korea. La Poem sang to the instrumental accompaniment of Korea Coop Orchestra (conducted by Kwang Hyun Kim and played by 53 artists) and a session band, which was organized by Dreamus Company.

Date	Concert	Artist
November 12	Ditto: La Poem & Rabidance	La Poem, Rabidance
November 13	Falling in La Poem	La Poem

=== Serenade of La Poem (December 25, 2021) ===
La Poem had duet concerts from December 21 to 24; Chaehoon performed with Minseong on the 21st and 23rd and Sunghoon with Kihun on 22nd and 24th in CJ Towol Theater, Seoul Arts Center, Seoul. Following these concerts, La Poem held a special event titled Serenade of La Poem combining a concert with a fan meeting in the same place on the 25th, which was hosted by Dreamus Company and CJ E&M; and organized by Moss Music.
