= Duetto (duo) =

South Korean musical duo

- Origin: Seoul, South Korea
- Genres: Classical; classical crossover
- Years active: 2017–present
- Labels: Starship Entertainment
- Members: Baek In-tae; Yoo Seul-gi

Duetto (듀에토) is a South Korean classical crossover duo consisting of Baek In-tae and Yoo Seul-gi, formed in 2017 by Starship Entertainment in Seoul. They released a self-titled EP on May 17, 2017, and two singles, "Dream" and "Reminisce", in 2018. They are both classically trained tenors who studied together at Hanyang University under baritone Go Sung-hyun.

Baek and Yoo were lead members of the boy band InGiHyunSang, the first runner-up in season one of the crossover audition program Phantom Singer.

== Members ==
- Baek In-tae (백인태)
- Yoo Seul-gi (유슬기)

== Discography ==
=== EP ===
Title	Album details	Peak chart positions	Sales
Title	Album details	KOR	Sales
Duetto	Released: May 17, 2017; Label: Starship Entertainment, LOEN Entertainment; Formats: CD, digital download; Track listing: 1. 봄이 분다; 2. Yearnings (그리움 끝에); 3. 옆사람; 4. Il Mondo; 5. 2막 1장	7	KOR: 4,088+

=== Singles ===
Title	Year	Album
"Dream" (드림)	2018	Non-album singles
"Reminisce" (추억을 걷다)	2018	Non-album singles
"—" denotes releases that did not chart.
