= Lee Hae-na =

Haena 이해나
- Born: Lee Hae-na; June 2, 1991 (age 34); Incheon, South Korea
- Occupation: Singer

Lee Hae-na (born June 2, 1991), credited and stylized simply as Haena, is a South Korean singer. She debuted as a member of the girl group Kiss&Cry, who released their first single, "Domino Game", in January 2014. Following the group's disbandment, she debuted for a second time in March 2016 as the leader of the girl group Matilda.

== Career ==
=== Kiss&Cry ===
Haena originally debuted with the four member girl group Kiss&Cry with the single "Domino Game". The debut music video was released on January 23, 2014.

Later that year, Haena appeared on the show Superstar K6, announcing Kiss&Cry's disbandment while auditioning for the show. She claimed that their company disbanded the group due to the public's response failing to meet their expectations. Despite their disbandment, Haena has still shown to be in contact with fellow former Kiss&Cry member Dia on her Instagram.

=== Solo ===
After Kiss&Cry's disbandment, Haena released a digital single titled "안 예쁜 끝 (Not So Pretty Ending)". It was released on iTunes on March 16, 2015.

=== Matilda ===
On March 14, 2016, Haena revealed via her Instagram that she would be debuting again as a member of a new group called Matilda under the label Box Media. The group debuted officially on March 18, 2016, on Music Bank with the single "Macarena".
