= Song Chang-sik =

South Korean singer-songwriter (born 1947)

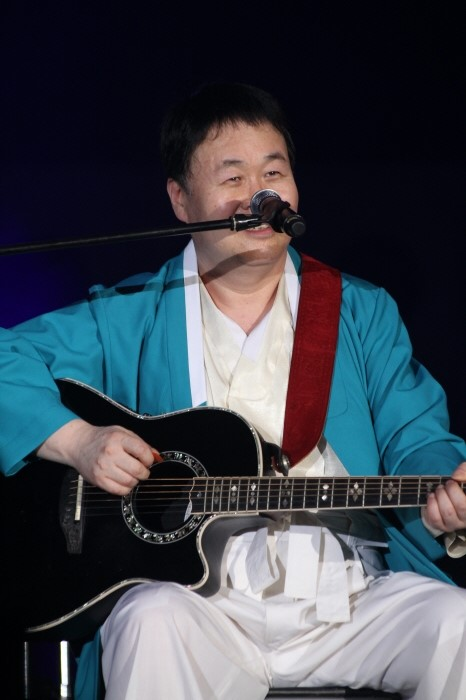
- Song in 2014

Background information
- Born: 2 February 1947 (age 79), Incheon, South Korea
- Genres: Folk; Folk rock
- Occupation: Singer-songwriter
- Years active: 1968–present
- Formerly of: Twin Folio

- Korean name
- Hangul: 송창식
- RR: Song Changsik
- MR: Song Ch'angsik

Song Chang-sik (Korean: 송창식; born 2 February 1947) is a South Korean singer-songwriter, who is considered one of the country's most important and influential musicians of the 1960s and 1970s. He debuted in 1968 as a member of the folk duo Twin Folio, and is credited as being in the vanguard of the early South Korean folk-rock scene.

== Biography ==
Song was born in 1947 in Incheon. He lost his father during the Korean War, and he lost his mother three years later. Song first dreamed of being a singer when he was in 6th grade after having seen a performance of the orchestra at the hall of Incheon Commercial Girls' High School. After meeting Lee Sang-byeok at a music room in Seoul called C'est ci bon, he started the band Twin Folio in 1967 with Yoon Hyung-joo, and made his solo debut in 1970.

== Honors ==
In 2012, Song was given the Order of Cultural Merit by the South Korean government, who referred to him as the "Godfather of Folk Rock."

== Awards ==
Year	Event	Category	Recipient	Result	Ref.
1975	MBC Ten Singers Song Festival	Best Song	"Why Do You Call Me?" ("왜 불러")	Won	
1975	MBC Ten Singers Song Festival	Most Popular Song	"Why Do You Call Me?" ("왜 불러")	Won	
2009	Golden Disc Awards	Achievement Award	Song Chang-sik	Won	
2015	Korean Music Awards	Achievement Award	Song Chang-sik	Won	
