= Forte di Quattro =

South Korean male vocal quartet

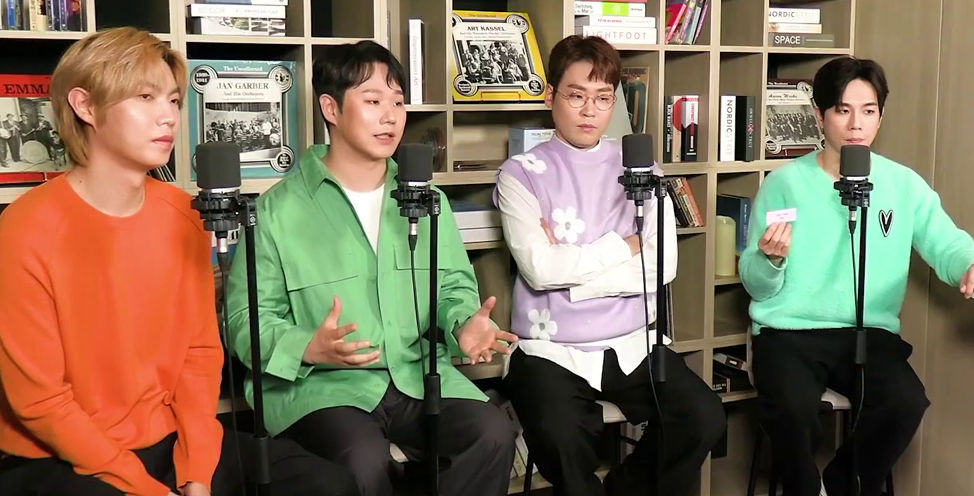

Background information
- Origin: Seoul, South Korea
- Genres: K-pop; popera
- Years active: 2017–present
- Labels: Arts & Artists
- Members: Ko Hoon-jeong; Kim Hyun-soo; Son Tae-jin; Lee Byeo-ri
- Website: www.artsnartists.com

Forte di Quattro (포르테 디 콰트로) is a South Korean male vocal quartet formed by the competition show Phantom Singer in 2017. The group debuted on May 18, 2017, with the eponymous album Forte di Quattro.

== History ==
=== Background and formation ===
Forte di Quattro, also known as FDQ, was formed during the first season of the competition show Phantom Singer and they were the winning quartet. The four members had separately auditioned for the show. They conceived the name to display their intentions of showing the "strength of four", as their name means in the Italian language. As the winning quartet, they won an exclusive contract to promote together for a year.

Ko Hoon-jeong had studied voice at Kyung Hee University but chose to pursue a career in musical theater. Kim Hyun-soo and Son Tae-jin were already acquainted as undergraduate voice students at Seoul National University's famed College of Music. Lee Byeo-ri, then working in the theater industry, is the only member without any formal training in singing but had experience as an amateur singer with various vocal groups.

=== 2017: Debut releases ===
On May 18, Forte di Quattro released their debut album Forte di Quattro. They embarked on a nationwide tour, performing at seventeen cities around the country. Following the success of the debut album, a repackaged edition was released in October.

On November 21, they released their second full-length album Classica. This was followed by another nationwide tour from the album's release until the end of December. Compared to their debut album Classica was much more rooted in classical music and notably sampled melodies from the works of Rachmaninoff, Tchaikovsky and Bizet.

=== 2018–present: Later releases and solo activities ===
Each member resumed their respective solo activities under different agencies. Go returned to musical theater while Kim and Son became solo artists and have occasionally returned to performing classical repertoire with other fellow Phantom Singer contestants.

In April 2018, the quartet performed overseas for the first time, making their debut in Japan. They performed at the Bunkamura in Tokyo, known as the home of the Tokyo Philharmonic Orchestra. The following month, they held a series of concerts in Seoul and Busan together with Phantom Singer 2 winners Forestella, whose members they were already acquainted with prior to Phantom Singer 2. To mark the occasion, they recorded and released a digital single, a remake of Renato Zero's hit "L'impossibile Vivere".

Since 2019, Forte di Quattro have held a series of summer and winter concerts. The summer concerts "Unplugged" was conceived to showcase each members' singing abilities and they perform in a concert hall without any microphones. The winter concerts "Notte Stellata" features a full orchestra accompanying them.

== Members ==
- Ko Hoon-jeong (고훈정) – baritone
- Kim Hyun-soo (김현수) – tenor
- Son Tae-jin (손태진) – bass-baritone
- Lee Byeo-ri (이벼리) – tenor

== Discography ==
=== Studio albums ===
Title	Album details	Peak chart positions	Sales
Title	Album details	KOR	Sales
Forte di Quattro	Released: May 18, 2017; Label: Arts & Artists, Universal Music; Formats: CD, digital download	4	KOR: 15,542
Classica (클라시카)	Released: November 21, 2017; Label: Arts & Artists, Universal Music; Formats: CD, digital download	10	KOR: 6,460
Harmonia	Released: November 7, 2019; Label: Arts & Artists, Universal Music; Formats: CD, digital download	26	KOR: 1,794
Metaphonic	Released: March 24, 2022; Label: Arts & Artists, Universal Music; Formats: CD, digital download	52	

=== Reissues ===
Title	Album details	Peak chart positions	Sales
Title	Album details	KOR	Sales
Forte di Quattro Repackage	Released: October 20, 2017; Label: Arts & Artists, Universal Music; Formats: CD, digital download	15	KOR: 2,369

=== Extended plays ===
Title	Album details	Peak chart positions	Sales
Title	Album details	KOR	Sales
Colors	Released: September 7, 2018; Label: Arts & Artists, Universal Music; Formats: CD, digital download	25	KOR: 1,890
