= RabidAnce =

South Korean crossover vocal group

RabidAnce 라비던스
- Origin: Seoul, South Korea
- Genres: Crossover music; classical music; gugak; world music; pop; disco; jazz; trot
- Years active: 2020–present
- Labels: Happy Tribe; Credia Music & Artists; Neo Trend Music
- Members: Kim Paul; John Noh (Noh Chongyoon); Ko Yeongyeol; Hwang Gunha

RabidAnce (Korean: 라비던스) is a South Korean crossover vocal group formed in 2020 though the third season of JTBC show Phantom Singer 3, where it finished second. The quartet is composed of bass Kim Paul, tenor John Noh, sorikkun (Korean pansori singer) Ko Yeongyeol, and musical theater actor Hwang Gunha.

RabidAnce released two singles in 2020, "Thank You" (Korean: 고맙습니다 RR: Gomapseumnida) and "The Song of Separation" (Korean: 이별가 RR: Ibyeolga). They were followed by its first mini album PRISM in 2021, and an additional digital single album, Memory, came shortly after. In March 2022, the members of RabidAnce left CREDIA Music & Artists and established their own label, Neotrend Music.

== Name ==
RabidAnce, which is a compound word made up of the English words "rabid" and "guidance", signifies the members' musical aspiration to "guide" audiences to their "rabid" musical diversity.

== Members ==
=== Kim, Paul ===
Kim, Paul (김바울), bassist and group leader, graduated from the College of Music of Kyung Hee University majoring in Vocal Music. The bass singer used to be a member of popera vocal group Ecclesia and gospel group Philos. In 2019, his team, Philos, was awarded in the Far East Broadcasting Company's gospel competitions.

Kim, Paul was born in Seoul on September 9, 1991. He was moved to Osaka, Japan, for his parents' missionary work and was a basketball player during his elementary school years in Osaka. He had been preparing for admission in a nursing program to achieve his dream of doing medical missionary work with his older brother. However, when he was hospitalized for a knee injury during his military service and witnessed how nurses worked in a hospital, it led him to give up his dream. At 22 years old, he officially started musical training recommended by a conductor in his church to pursue his dream of becoming a contemporary Christian music (CCM) musician. He was accepted into the College of Music of Kyung Hee University. After his graduation, Kim moved to Germany for post-grad studies, but returned to Korea to audition for Phantom Singer 3. Since September 2020, he has been with his management company, Arts & Artists.

=== John Noh ===
John Noh (노종윤; Noh, Chongyoon), tenor, completed his Bachelor of Music program from the Peabody Institute of the Johns Hopkins University. After that, he received his master's degree from the Juilliard School and then finished the master of musical arts program at Yale School of Music with a full scholarship. John Noh made his debut at Carnegie Hall as a vocal soloist for the Mozart's "Requiem Mass in D minor" in 2018

John Noh, born on June 8, 1991, in Seoul, used to be a choirboy, capable of beatboxing, who frequently stopped by noraebang during his elementary and middle school days. He was sent to attend a Christian high school in the U.S. to take theology classes to follow suit after his father who was a pastor. Right before his graduation, John viewed a clip of Pavarotti singing "Nessun dorma" from Puccini’s opera Turandot. Deeply moved, he began studying vocal music. After the first year in Peabody, John couldn't afford the remaining years so he went back to Korea to do mandatory military service. Meanwhile, he was automatically dismissed from the university due to a leave of absence of more than one year. John made a video audition tape of himself singing a Mozart aria and sent it to Peabody that not only took him back but also gave him a scholarship. While pursuing his Master's degree at Yale University, his grandmother passed away in Korea. The incident made him realize he had never had a chance to show his performances to his family. John decided, if any chances were offered, he would come back to Korea to sing for his family, so he auditioned for Phantom Singer 3 to start his singing career in Korea.

=== Ko, Yeongyeol ===
Ko, Yeongyeol (고영열), pansori singer (sorikkun), graduated from the College of Music at Hanyang University majoring in Korean Traditional Music. He won (the 1st prize in) the pansori competition at the 34th annual Onnara Gugak Contest. He is a singer-songwriter based on a piano. Besides, a new word such as "Piano byeongchang (피아노 병창)" has been used when he performs a pansori accompanied by a piano by himself.

Ko, Yeongyeol was born on March 9, 1993, in Gwangju, South Korea. When he was 13, his mother advised him to start taking pansori lessons which was believed to be helpful to increase his lung capacity to become a professional swimmer. Instead, this experience helped him find his talent in pansori. The more his affection towards traditional music grew, the more his concerns deepened because of the public's low interest in the field. Also he has collaborated with artists from other genres such as Seunghee from Oh My Girl, bass singer Son Tae-jin from Forte di Quattro, and Indi duo Okdal. When asked what made him join Phantom Singer 3, he answered it was his desire to learn more about crossover music and form a crossover vocal group capable of a musical experiment.

=== Hwang, Gunha ===
Hwang, Gunha (황건하) is an undergraduate student at Chung-Ang University majoring in Theater. He received the High school Musical Star award at the DIMF (Daegu International Music Festival) and the gold prize in the middle & high school category at the Musical Star Festival in 2015.

Hwang, Gunha was born on August 7, 1997, in Anyang, Gyeonggi-do, South Korea. His older brother majored in classical piano and his mother loved going to performances with Gunha which, he said, influenced him a lot. When Hwang enrolled into Hanlim Arts High School with a musical major, it was his mother who encouraged him. PL Entertainment, usually representing big-name musical stars such as Hong Kwang Ho, recruited Hwang, Gunha even before he made an official debut as an actor. The CEO of PL Entertainment said when she met him she had a hunch that Hwang would one day become a big theater star, based on her long experience in this industry. He made his debut as a musical theater actor on August 19, 2021, playing a leading role, Yi Yeong, a crown prince of the Joseon dynasty, in the Korean original musical called Forbidden Music (Korean: 금악, RR: Geumak)

== Career ==
=== Pre-debut: Phantom Singer 3 ===
Phantom Singer, an audition show aiming to find a male cross-over vocal quartet, aired its third season in 2020. Kim Paul, John Noh, Ko Yeongyeol and Hwang Gunha made it to the final round.

Ko and Noh first met during the one on one match, where Ko picked world music and appointed Noh as his rival to compete with. They performed Cuban singer Pablo Milanés' "Tú Eres la Música Que Tengo Que Cantar." On the next match between duets, Ko asked Hwang Gunha to form a team with him and they sang "Ti Pathos" by Greek singer George Dalaras. The two of them advanced together to the trio match, where they performed Yoon Sang's "To the Winds (Korean: 바람에게, RR: baramege)." Noh and Kim also participated in the trio match, but with different partners.

All four members didn't rank in the top 3, which would have allowed them to keeping their trio members for the next round, and were not chosen as the fourth member by any of the surviving three teams. Kim, Noh and Ko formed a quartet with Jeong Minseong and performed a gagok (Korean lyric songs), "A Scary Time(Korean:무서운 시간 RR: museoun sigan)" composed by Kim Joowon with the lyrics from the poem of the same title written by Korean resistance poet Yun Dong-ju in 1941 at the end of the Japanese colonial era.

After Kim, Noh, Ko and Hwang each went through every round, they formed a quartet just before the final round. They named themselves RabidAnce and performed four songs in the final round. The first one was a Korean Namdo minyo (folk songs of the southern provinces in Korea), "Heung Taryeong (흥타령)" which described the transience of life in a sorrowful voice. Their second song was Stevie Wonder's "Another Star." In the middle of the song, Noh and Ko exchanged scat. Jeon In-kwon's "After the Love has Gone (Korean: 사랑한 후에, RR: saranghan hue)" was their third song in the final round. RabidAnce put on their last performance with Israeli musical group Idan Raichel Project's "Milim Yaffot Me'Eleh (meaning "Nicer Words Than These")."

== Artistry ==
From their formation, the members of RabidAnce have expressed their aim to become a vocal team which introduces Korean sentiments such as heung and han to the world since a Korean pansori singer is included in the group. During Phantom Singer, they performed genres of gugak, pop songs, world music, and Korean popular music amongst other.

== Discography ==
=== Studio albums ===
List of studio albums
| Title | Release date | Remarks |
|---|---|---|
| Prism | July 7, 2021 | The 1st mini album |

=== Singles and EPs ===
| Title | Release date | Album | Remarks |
|---|---|---|---|
| Happy Traditional Song (Korean: 흥타령, RR: heungtaryeong) | June 27, 2020 | Phantom Singer 3 Ep.9 | Arranged from heungtaryeong, which is a Korean Namdo minyo, in a modern way |
| Another Star | June 27, 2020 | Phantom Singer 3 Ep.9 | Cover of the original song by Stevie Wonder |
| After the Love Has Gone (Korean: 사랑한 후에, RR: saranghan hue) | July 7, 2020 | Phantom Singer 3 Ep.10 | Cover of the original song by Jeon In-kwon |
| Millim Yaffot Me'Eleh (Hebrew: מילים יפות מאלה) (English: Nicer Words Than These) | July 7, 2020 | Phantom Singer 3 Ep.10 | Cover of the original song by The Idan Raichel Project |
| Thank You (Korean: 고맙습니다, RR: gomapseumnida) | November 9, 2020 | Digital single | The 1st single |
| Song of Separation (Korean: 이별가, RR: ibyeolga) | November 27, 2020 | Digital single | "Ibyeolga" is derived from one of the parts of Pansori Chunhyangga by being reinterpreted in a modern way |
| Monggeumpo Taryeong (Korean: 몽금포타령) | January 7, 2021 | Phantom Singer All star Ep.1 | Arranged from one of the folk songs in Hwanghae province in Korea with mash-up of "Bae ttuiwora (Sail the boat)" belonging to Gyeonggi folk songs |
| Ai No Corrida | February 18, 2021 | Phantom Singer All star Ep.2 | Cover of the original song by Quincy Jones |
| Luci | March 17, 2021 | Phantom Singer All star Ep.8 | Cover of the original song by Marchio Bossa |
| Yoke (Korean: 멍에, RR: meonge) | March 24, 2021 | Phantom Singer All star Ep.9 | Cover of the original song by Kim Soo Hee |
| He Lives in You | April 6, 2021 | Phantom Singer All star Ep. 10 | Cover of the original song from The Lion King 2 OST |
| Notas de memorias (feat. Park Ju Won) | November 19, 2021 | Memory-Digital Single | The 1st song of RabidAnce's single, Memory |
| Ode to Autumn (Korean: 가을의 선물, RR: gaeurui seonmul) | November 19, 2021 | Memory-Digital Single | The 2nd song of RabidAnce's single, Memory |

== Videography ==
=== Music TV shows ===
| Title | Network | Date | Remarks |
|---|---|---|---|
| Phantom Singer 3 | JTBC | April 10 – July 3, 2020 | |
| The Show | SBS MTV | November 17, 2020 | Performed "Thank You" |
| Inkigayo | SBS | November 22, 2020 | Performed "Thank You" |
| Music Bank | KBS2 | November 27, 2020 | Performed "Thank You" |
| Phantom Singer All star | JTBC | January 26 – April 20, 2021 | |
| Open Concert | KBS1 | May 2, 2021 | Performed "Song of Separation" & "Luci" |
| Open Concert | KBS1 | July 4, 2021 | Performed "Monggeumpo Traditional Song" & "Ai No Corrida" |
| EBS Space 공감 (RR: gonggam, Eng: Empathy) | EBS | August 6, 2021 | Performed "The Edge of Love", "Englishman in New York", "As Flowers Bloom and Fall" and "Monggeumpo Traditional Song" |
| Open Concert | KBS1 | August 29, 2021 | Performed "Never Gonna Give You Up," and "I can prove" |
| Open Concert | KBS1 | January 30, 2022 | Performed "상주아리랑(RR: sangju arirang)" and "Notas De Memorias." Sang "Nostalgic Gangnam (Korean: 그리운 강남)+아리랑(RR: Arirang)" with (Jang Sa-ik, Yang Bang Ean and Kim Yulhui) |
| Korea PD Awards | KBS 1 | April 30, 2022 | Performed "Another Star" Presented the Digital Content award |

=== Entertainment TV shows and Others ===
| Title | Network | Date | Remarks |
|---|---|---|---|
| Hidden Singer 6 | JTBC | August 28, 2020 | A panel guest for the Ep.4 "Baek Ji-young" |
| Differential Class (Korean: 차이나는 클라스, RR: chainaneun keullaseu) | JTBC | October 19 & 26, 2020 | The guest of Ep.179 & 180 "World music" |
| The 41st Blue Dragon Film Awards (Korean: 청룡영화상, RR: cheongnyongyeonghwasang) | SBS | February 9, 2021 | Performed "Thank You" |
| Catchy Korea (캐치코리아) | Arirang TV | March 8, 2021 | Interview |
| AM Plaza (Korean: 아침마당) | KBS1 | June 7, 2021 | Interviews and performances |

== External links section ==
- Official YouTube Channel
- Official BIO on CREDIA (RabidAnce's agency) website
