= List of Hangout with Yoo episodes =

Hangout with Yoo (Korean: 놀면 뭐하니?; RR: Nolmyeon mwohani?; lit. 'How Do You Play?') is a South Korean variety show hosted by Yoo Jae-suk. Hangout with Yoo first aired on July 27, 2019.

As of June 7, 2025, 284 episodes + 1 pilot of Hangout with Yoo have aired.

== Series overview ==
Year	Episodes	Originally released	
Year	Episodes	First released	Last released
2019	23	July 27, 2019	December 28, 2019
2020	50	January 4, 2020	December 26, 2020
2021	46	January 2, 2021	December 18, 2021
2022	47	January 1, 2022	December 31, 2022
2023	48	January 7, 2023	December 30, 2023
2024	46	January 6, 2024	December 28, 2024
2025	43	January 11, 2025	December 27, 2025
2026	TBA	January 3, 2026	TBA

== Episodes ==
=== 2019 ===
Episodes 1–23

List of episodes (episode 1–23)

Episode	Broadcast Date	Segment(s) + Guest(s)	Special Appearances by	Ref.
Pilot	July 20	Yoo Jae-suk → Jo Se-ho → Tae Hang-ho → Yoo Byung-jae → DinDin → Yunho (TVXQ)	Tae Hang-ho's camera: Lee Kyu-hyung; Yoo Il-han	
1	July 27	Viewing room: Yoo Jae-suk, Jo Se-ho, Tae Hang-ho, DinDin, Yunho (TVXQ), Defconn Camera 1: Yoo Jae-suk → You Hee-yeol → Jung Seung-hwan → Jung Jae-hyung (Note: Due to him being the fixed MC on "Immortal Songs: Singing the Legend", which airs on the same time slot as "Hangout with Yoo", his appearance was briefly aired on the MBC broadcast. The full video with his appearance would only be available on the show's official YouTube Channel.) → Jang Yoon-ju → Lee Dong-hwi → Park Byung-eun; Camera 2: Yoo Jae-suk → Haha → Yang Se-hyung → Yoo Se-yoon → Ahn Young-mi → Song Eun-i → Park Myeong-su	Haha's camera: Byul; Yang Se-chan; Jang Yoon-ju's camera: Jung Seung-min; Jo Yoon-hee; Ahn Young-mi's camera: Kim Gu-ra; Yoon Jong-shin; Lee Dong-hwi's camera: Lee Byeong-heon; Ryu Seung-ryong; Lee Hanee; Gong Myung; Park Jeong-min; Song Eun-i's camera: Kim Sook; Park Byung-eun's camera: Ha Jung-woo (via phone); Ju Ji-hoon; Bae Doona; Special voice appearance: Jeon So-min	
2	August 3	Viewing room: Yoo Jae-suk, Jo Se-ho, Tae Hang-ho, DinDin, Yunho (TVXQ), Defconn Camera 1: Yoo Jae-suk → You Hee-yeol → Jung Seung-hwan → Jung Jae-hyung → Jang Yoon-ju → Lee Dong-hwi → Park Byung-eun; Camera 2: Yoo Jae-suk → Haha → Yang Se-hyung → Yoo Se-yoon → Ahn Young-mi → Song Eun-i → Park Myeong-su	Haha's camera: Byul; Yang Se-chan; Jang Yoon-ju's camera: Jung Seung-min; Jo Yoon-hee; Ahn Young-mi's camera: Kim Gu-ra; Yoon Jong-shin; Lee Dong-hwi's camera: Lee Byeong-heon; Ryu Seung-ryong; Lee Hanee; Gong Myung; Park Jeong-min; Song Eun-i's camera: Kim Sook; Park Byung-eun's camera: Ha Jung-woo (via phone); Ju Ji-hoon; Bae Doona; Special voice appearance: Jeon So-min	
3	August 10	Jo's Apartment: (Note: Jo Se-ho's apartment was used to hold a housewarming party, and watch the recordings from the Camera Relays.) Yoo Jae-suk, Jo Se-ho, Tae Hang-ho, Yunho (TVXQ), Defconn, Yoo Byung-jae, Yoo Il-han, Jang Yoon-ju, Yang Se-hyung, Irene Kim		
4	August 17	Jo's Apartment: Yoo Jae-suk, Jo Se-ho, Tae Hang-ho, Yunho (TVXQ), Defconn, Yoo Byung-jae, Yoo Il-han, Yang Se-hyung, Irene Kim, Lee Kyu-hyung, Lee Sung-kyung; Yoo-plash: You Hee-yeol, Lee Juck, SonStar (Cherry Filter)		
5	August 24	Viewing room: Yoo Jae-suk, Jo Se-ho, Tae Hang-ho, Yunho (TVXQ), Defconn, Yang Se-hyung, Lee Kyu-hyung Korea Live (Note: Yoo and several celebrities each move out to different places in South Korea to find out about the real lives of South Koreans.) (Transport): Seoul - Defconn; Bonghwa - Lee Kyu-hyung, Tae Hang-ho; Taean - Yoo Jae-suk; Bucheon - Yang Se-hyung; Suwon - Yunho (TVXQ); Busan - Jo Se-ho		
6	August 31	Yoo-plash: You Hee-yeol, Lee Juck, Yoon Sang, Lee Sang-soon, Jukjae, Sunwoo Jung-a, Jeong Dong-hwan (MeloMance)		
7	September 7	Yoo-plash: You Hee-yeol, Lee Juck, Jeong Dong-hwan (MeloMance), Jukjae, Gray, Dynamic Duo, Rhythm Power (Boi B, Geegooin), Lee Tae-yun, Jang Hyuk, Heize, Paul Kim, Peakboy		
8	September 14	Viewing room: Yoo Jae-suk, Jo Se-ho, Tae Hang-ho, Yunho (TVXQ), Defconn, Yang Se-hyung, Lee Kyu-hyung, Kim Yong-myung Korea Live (Photo Studio): Seoul - Jo Se-ho, Tae Hang-ho, Yang Se-hyung, Yunho (TVXQ), Defconn, Lee Kyu-hyung; Incheon - Yoo Jae-suk, Kim Yong-myung		
9	September 21	Bbong For Yoo: Park Hyun-woo, Choi Kang-san, Park Kang-sung, Joo Hyun-mi, Cho Hang-jo, Kim Hye-yeon, Park Hyun-bin, Park Sang-chul, Na Sang-do, Tae Jin-ah, Kim Yeon-ja, Jin Sung, Kim Do-il, Yoon Soo-hyun		
10	September 28	Yoo-plash: You Hee-yeol, Lee Juck, Sunwoo Jung-a, Paul Kim, Peakboy, Heize, Yun Seok-cheol, Han Sang-won, Lee Sang-min, DOCSKIM, So!YoON!/Hwang So-yoon (Se So Neon), SUMIN), UV,		
11	October 5	Yoo-plash: You Hee-yeol, Lee Juck, Kim Eana, UV, Urban Zakapa, Mommy Son, Crush, Sam Kim, Colde, Zion.T, SonStar (Cherry Filter), Han Sang-won		
12	October 12	Bbong For Yoo: Tae Jin-ah, Kim Yeon-ja, Jin Sung, Kim Do-il, Jung Won-soo, Lee Geon-woo, Jeong Dong-hwan (MeloMance), Seol Ha-yoon, Park Hyun-woo		
13	October 19	Yoo-plash Solo Drum Recital: SonStar (Cherry Filter), You Hee-yeol, UV, Lee Juck, Kim Eana, Urban Zakapa, Heize, Paul Kim, Peakboy, Zion.T, Colde, Han Sung-won, Lee Sang-min, Jeon So-mi		
14	October 26	Yoo-plash Solo Drum Recital: SonStar (Cherry Filter), You Hee-yeol, UV, Lee Juck, Kim Eana, Urban Zakapa, Heize, Paul Kim, Peakboy, Zion.T, Colde, Han Sung-won, Lee Sang-min, So!YoON!/Hwang So-yoon (Se So Neon), SUMIN, DOCKSIM, Lee Seung-hwan, Ha Hyun-woo (Guckkasten); Bbong For Yoo: Song Ga-in, Park Hyun-woo, Jeong Kyung-chun, Lee Geon-woo	Voice appearance: Yoon Myung-seon	
15	November 2	Bbong For Yoo: Park Hyun-woo, Jeong Kyung-chun, Lee Geon-woo, Bae Il-ho, Jin Sung, Kim Do-il, Park Sang-chul		
16	November 9	Bbong For Yoo: Kim Eana, Cho Young-soo, Park Hyun-bin, Yoon Soo-hyun, Park Mi-hyun, Park Hyun-woo, Jeong Kyung-chun, Lee Geon-woo, Kim Hyo-soo, Kim Yeon-ja, Hong Jin-young		
17	November 16	Bbong For Yoo (Busking at Incheon Chinatown and Hapjeong Station): Cho Young-soo, Hong Jin-young, Park Hyun-woo, Jeong Kyung-chun, Lee Geon-woo, Kim Yeon-ja, Jin Sung, Kim Do-il, Lee Jeong-hwan, Lee Hyung-won, Yang Seung-bong		
18	November 23	Bbong For Yoo (Music video filming + appearance at KBS AM Plaza): Lee Jeong-hwan, Lee Hyung-won, Yang Seung-bong, Do Yoon, Soran, Park Sung-chul, Lee Yong-sik, YeonHaNams, Lee Yong-ju, YOYOMI, Kim Jae-won, Lee Jeong-min, Yoon Soo-hyun, Lee Ho-seob, Kum Jan-di		
19	November 30	Bbong For Yoo: Hooni Yongi, Jung Won-soo, Jung Eui-han, Park Heon-sang, Nokdu, Park Woong, Bae Chil-soo, Park Hee-jin, Park Hyun-woo, Jeong Kyung-chun, Lee Geon-woo		
20	December 7	Bbong For Yoo: Yeo Kyung-rae, Park Hyun-woo, Jeong Kyung-chun, Lee Geon-woo		
21	December 14	Bbong For Yoo: Kim Do-il, Jo Se-ho, Park Sang-chul		
22	December 21	Bbong For Yoo: Kim Do-il, Jo Se-ho, Joo Hyun-mi, Park Sang-chul, Park Ku-yoon, So Myung, Kim Jeong-ho, Haesoo, Jin Sung, SonStar, Park Jeong-wan, Hong Sung-jin, Park Seul-gi, Park Hyun-woo, Jeong Kyung-chun, Lee Geon-woo		
23	December 28	Bbong For Yoo (1st Album Goodbye Concert): Park Hyun-woo, Jeong Kyung-chun, Lee Geon-woo, Kim Do-il, Do Yoon, Soran, Jin Sung, Park Sang-chul, Hong Jin-young, Kim Yeon-ja, Sim Sung-rak, Hareem	Video appearances by Bae Cheol-soo, You Hee-yeol, Im Jin-mo	

=== 2020 ===
Episodes 24–73

List of episodes (episode 24–73)

Episode	Broadcast Date	Segment(s) + Guest(s)	Special Appearances by	Ref.
24	January 4	Bbong For Yoo (1st Album Goodbye Concert): Sim Sung-rak, Yoon Young-in, Hareem, Park Hyun-woo, Jeong Kyung-chun, Lee Geon-woo, Jo Se-ho, Pengsoo	Video appearances by Bae Cheol-soo, You Hee-yeol	
25	January 11	Bbong For Yoo (Final parts of 1st album promotions): Kim Shin-young; Life Ramyeon: Park Young-eun, Jang Sung-kyu	Voice appearance by Haha	
26	January 18	Life Ramyeon: Park Young-eun, Shim Young-soon, Yeo Kyung-rae, Oh Se-deuk, Jung Ho-young, Jang Sung-kyu, Jang Do-yeon, Yang Se-chan, Jo Se-ho, Kim Gu-ra, Park Myung-soo		
Lunar New Year Special	January 25	Bbong For You (Yoo San-seul 1st Album Goodbye Concert Director's Cut)		
Lunar New Year Special	January 27	Life Ramyeon Special		
27	February 1	Life Ramyeon: Park Myung-soo, Jeong Jun-ha, Yang Se-hyung, Hong Hyun-hee, Yoo Min-sang, Kim Jun-hyun, Kim Min-kyung, Moon Se-yoon		
28	February 8	Life Ramyeon: Lee Hyo-ri, Lee Sang-soon, Leeteuk (Super Junior); Hangout with Yoo X Giant Peng TV: Pengsoo		
29	February 15	Bbong For Yoo (1st Album Reward Vacation - One Ball Tour): Ji Suk-jin, Lee Kwang-soo, Jo Se-ho		
30	February 22	Bbong For Yoo (1st Album Reward Vacation - One Ball Tour): Ji Suk-jin, Lee Kwang-soo, Jo Se-ho; Yoo-chestra: (Note: Yoo, as Yoorpheus, learns to play the harp, and eventually plays a music piece, together with the Korean Symphony Orchestra.) Park Hyun-woo, Jeong Kyung-chun, Lee Geon-woo, Park Yoon-ha, Yoon Hye-soon		
31	February 29	Yoo-chestra: You Hee-yeol, Lee Juck, Kim Kwang-min, Son Yeol-eum, Yoon Hye-soon, Park Yoon-ha, Yeo Ja-kyung, Park Hyun-woo, Jeong Kyung-chun, Lee Geon-woo		
32	March 7	Radi-Yoo Star: (Note: Yoo, as DJ Yoo (full name being Yoo DJ Hype This Party), becomes a one-time midnight radio DJ. This project was taken up at the last minute due to the current 2020 coronavirus pandemic in South Korea.) Ji Suk-jin, Ji Sang-ryeol, Jo Se-ho, Hong Jin-young, Hong Hyun-hee, Jang Sung-kyu, Jang Do-yeon; Indoor Concert: Kim Kwang-min, Hyukoh, Hong Ji-min, Park Joon-myeon, Shin Young-sook		
33	March 14	Bbong For Yoo X Yoo-chestra: Yoon Myung-seon, Song Ga-in, Kim Kyeong-beom, Kim Ji-hwan; Indoor Concert: Jang Beom-june		
34	March 21	Indoor Concert: Kim Kwang-min, You Hee-yeol, Lee Juck, Jang Beom-june, Hong Ji-min, Park Joon-myeon, Shin Young-sook, Zico (Block B), Dvwn, Lee Seung-hwan		
35	March 28	Indoor Concert: Kim Kwang-min, You Hee-yeol, Lee Juck, Sunwoo Jung-a, Se So Neon, Lee Seung-hwan, Jannabi, Song Ga-in, Simon Dominic, Gray, Code Kunst, Woo Won-jae		
36	April 4	Indoor Concert: Kim Kwang-min, You Hee-yeol, Lee Juck, Simon Dominic, Gray, Code Kunst, Woo Won-jae, Lee Ja-ram, Lee Joon-hyung; Chicken Doctor Yoo: Park Myung-soo, Lee Wook-jung, Yoo Min-sang, Kim Jun-hyun, Kim Min-kyung, Moon Se-yoon		
37	April 11	Indoor Concert: Kim Kwang-min, You Hee-yeol, Lee Juck, Son Yeol-eum, Hyukoh, Lee Jung-eun; Chicken Doctor Yoo: Park Myung-soo, Lee Yeon-bok, Tzuyang		
38	April 18	Yoo-niverse (Secondary Role's World): (Note: Yoo chooses three of the characters he had done before, and does indoor live streams with the characters at the same time. This project was initiated due to the current 2020 coronavirus pandemic in South Korea.) Jang Beom-june, Park Joon-myeon, Sook Haeng, Hong Ja, Kim So-U, Jung Da-kyung, Park Sang-chul, Lee Dong-jin, Lee Wook-jung, Kim Do-il		
39	April 25	Chicken Doctor Yoo: Park Myung-soo, Tzuyang, Kim Mi-ryeo, Bae Cheol-soo		
40	May 2	Porridge Rice Teacher Yoo: (Note: Yoo first goes on live stream to cook home cooked food, then visits the residences of 2 celebrities Yoo met before.) Kim Kwang-min, Simon Dominic		
41	May 9	Summer X Dance X Yoo Jae-suk: Lee Sang-min, Lee Ji-hye, Kim Sung-soo (Cool), Yoon Il-sang, Lee Hyo-ri, Lee Sang-soon		
42	May 16	Summer X Dance X Yoo Jae-suk: Hwang Kwang-hee, Lee Ji-hye, Henry, Rain		
43	May 23	Chicken Doctor Yoo - Saturday Saturday Chicken: Park Myung-soo, Jeong Jun-ha, Haha, Kim Yeon-koung, Lee Ji-hye, Kim Shin-young		
44	May 30	Summer X Dance X Yoo Jae-suk: Lee Hyo-ri, Rain, Hwang Kwang-hee, Zico (Block B), Simon Dominic, Code Kunst		
45	June 6	SSAK3: Lee Hyo-ri, Rain, Hwang Kwang-hee, Zico (Block B), Park Moonchi, Simon Dominic, Code Kunst, Lee Hyun-seung		
46	June 13	SSAK3: Lee Hyo-ri, Rain, Joo Young-hoon, Park Hyun-woo, Muzie, Code Kunst, Lee Hyun-seung		
47	June 20	SSAK3: Lee Hyo-ri, Rain, Hwang Kwang-hee, Code Kunst, Lee Hyun-seung, Muzie		
48	June 27	SSAK3: Lee Hyo-ri, Rain, Hwang Kwang-hee, Han Hye-yeon, Park Moonchi		
49	July 4	SSAK3: Lee Hyo-ri, Rain, Hwang Kwang-hee, Shim Eun-ji		
50	July 11	SSAK3: Lee Hyo-ri, Rain, Lee Sang-soon, Playing Child, Zico, Park Kang-yeol, Bae Sang-mi, Go Soo-bong		
51	July 18	SSAK3: Lee Hyo-ri, Rain, Hong Jang-hyun, Lumpens, Park Hyun-woo, Song Sung-kyung, AND		
52	July 25	SSAK3: Lee Hyo-ri, Rain, Park Seul-gi, Park Hyun-woo, Song Sung-kyung, AND, Hwang Kwang-hee, Code Kunst, Lee Hyun-seung, Cosmic Girl, Mamamoo, Lumpens		
53	August 1	SSAK3: Lee Hyo-ri, Rain, Chani (SF9), Hyunjin (Stray Kids), Kim Min-ju (IZ*ONE), Dongkiz I:KAN, Jeon So-mi, Red Velvet - Irene & Seulgi		
54	August 8	SSAK3: Lee Hyo-ri, Rain, Lee Dae-hwi (AB6IX), Han Hyun-min, Hwang Kwang-hee, Soyou, Teen Top, Eric Nam, Jessi		
55	August 15	SSAK3: Lee Hyo-ri, Rain		
56	August 22	Refund Sisters: Uhm Jung-hwa, Lee Hyo-ri, Jessi, Hwasa (Mamamoo)		
57	August 29	Refund Sisters: Uhm Jung-hwa, Lee Hyo-ri, Jessi, Hwasa (Mamamoo), Yang Se-chan, Jo Se-ho, Jung Jae-hyung		
58	September 5	Refund Sisters: Uhm Jung-hwa, Lee Hyo-ri, Jessi, Hwasa (Mamamoo), Lee Sang-min, Hwang Kwang-hee, Kim Jong-min (Koyote)		
59	September 12	Refund Sisters: Uhm Jung-hwa, Lee Hyo-ri, Jessi, Hwasa (Mamamoo), Song Eun-i, Lee Sang-soon, Kim Jong-min (Koyote), Rado (Black Eyed Pilseung)		
60	September 19	Refund Sisters: Uhm Jung-hwa, Lee Hyo-ri, Jessi, Hwasa (Mamamoo), Jung Jae-hyung, Kim Jong-min (Koyote)		
61	September 26	Refund Sisters: Uhm Jung-hwa, Lee Hyo-ri, Jessi, Hwasa (Mamamoo), Jung Jae-hyung, Kim Jong-min (Koyote), Rado (Black Eyed Pilseung)		
62	October 3	Refund Sisters: Uhm Jung-hwa, Lee Hyo-ri, Jessi, Hwasa (Mamamoo), Jung Jae-hyung, Kim Jong-min (Koyote)		
63	October 10	Refund Sisters: Uhm Jung-hwa, Lee Hyo-ri, Jessi, Hwasa (Mamamoo), Jung Jae-hyung, Kim Jong-min (Koyote), Noh Young-joo, Black Eyed Pilseung, JeonGoon		
64	October 17	Refund Sisters: Uhm Jung-hwa, Lee Hyo-ri, Jessi, Hwasa (Mamamoo), Jung Jae-hyung, Kim Jong-min (Koyote), All Ready		
65	October 24	Refund Sisters: Uhm Jung-hwa, Lee Hyo-ri, Jessi, Hwasa (Mamamoo), Jung Jae-hyung, Kim Jong-min (Koyote), Hook, The Boyz, WJSN Chocome, NCT U, Dawn, Chani (SF9), Hyunjin (Stray Kids), Kim Min-ju (IZ*ONE)		
66	October 31	Refund Sisters: Uhm Jung-hwa, Lee Hyo-ri, Jessi, Hwasa (Mamamoo), Jung Jae-hyung, Kim Jong-min (Koyote), Hong Won-ki, Lee Hye-joo, Kim Jun-hong, Kim Nam-seon, Jang Deok-hwa		
67	November 7	Refund Sisters: Uhm Jung-hwa, Lee Hyo-ri, Jessi, Hwasa (Mamamoo), Jung Jae-hyung, Kim Jong-min (Koyote)		
68	November 14	Refund Sisters: Uhm Jung-hwa, Lee Hyo-ri, Jessi, Hwasa (Mamamoo), Jung Jae-hyung, Kim Jong-min (Koyote), Lee Sang-soon; Life Ramyeon: Kim Jong-min		
69	November 21	Kimchi Expedition Team: (Note: Yoo, together with Jung Jae-hyung, Kim Jong-min and Defconn (who arrives later), make Gimjang to thank the celebrities who have contributed to the show throughout the year.) Jung Jae-hyung, Kim Jong-min, Defconn, Uhm Jung-hwa, Jessi, Mamamoo, Black Eyed Pilseung, STAYC, Lee Sang-soon, Lee Hyo-ri, Rain, Hwang Kwang-hee, You Hee-yeol, Lee Juck, Kim Kwang-min, Simon Dominic, Yoon Hye-soon, Pengsoo, Haha, Jeong Jun-ha, Park Myung-soo, Ji Suk-jin, Lee Kwang-soo, Jo Se-ho, Yoo Min-sang, Kim Jun-hyun, Kim Min-kyung, Moon Se-yoon		
70	November 28	H&H Corporation: Kim Jong-min, Defconn		
71	December 5	H&H Corporation: Kim Jong-min, Defconn, Jun Hyun-moo		
72	December 12	Winter Songs Resurrection Plan: Defconn, Tak Jae-hoon, Kim Jong-min, Yoon Jong-shin		
73	December 26	Winter Songs Resurrection Plan: Defconn, Kim Bum-soo, Kim Jong-min, Lee Moon-sae, Mr.2, Tak Jae-hoon		

=== 2021 ===
Episodes 74–119

List of episodes (episode 74–119)

Episode	Broadcast Date	Segment(s) + Guest(s)	Special Appearances by	Ref.
74	January 2	Winter Songs Resurrection Plan: Defconn, Kim Bum-soo, Jeong Dong-hwan (MeloMance), Ailee, Yoon Jong-shin, Lee Moon-sae	Special video appearance by John Legend	
75	January 9	Variety Investor: Kim Jong-min (Koyote), Defconn, Jo Byeong-kyu, Kim So-yeon	Voice appearances through phone by Lee Sang-soon, Lee Hyo-ri and Rain	
76	January 16	Variety Investor: Kim Jong-min (Koyote), Defconn, Jang Hang-jun, Lee Jin-ho, Greg Priester, Lee Young-ji, Tak Jae-hoon, Kim Sook	Voice appearance through phone by Lee Sang-yeob	
77	January 23	Let's Have A Meal: (Note: Yoo, Defconn and Kim Jong-min opens a live stream and eats together with the fans of the show.) Kim Jong-min (Koyote), Defconn		
78	January 30	Variety Investor: Kim Jong-min (Koyote), Defconn, Jo Se-ho, Hwang Kwang-hee, Hong Hyun-hee, Shin Kyu-jin, Kim Seung-hye, Lee Eun-ji, Ha Jun-su, Kim Hae-jun; Chief Investigation Officer Yoo: (Note: Yoo, as Detective Yoo, investigates and solves crime scenes, together with Kim Jong-min and Defconn (and later joined by Jung Jae-hyung and Mijoo).) Kim Jong-min (Koyote), Defconn	Voice appearance through phone by Park Ku-yoon	
79	February 6	Chief Investigation Officer Yoo: Kim Jong-min (Koyote), Defconn, Kwon Il-yong, Jung Jae-hyung, Mijoo (Lovelyz)		
80	February 13	2021 Live And Fall Together: Kim Jong-min (Koyote), Defconn, Jo Byeong-kyu, Jo Se-ho, Jessi, Kim Seung-hye, Kim Hye-yoon, Hong Hyun-hee, Tak Jae-hoon, Lee Young-ji, Juyeon (The Boyz), Chuu (Loona)		
81	February 20	2021 Live And Fall Together: Kim Jong-min (Koyote), Defconn, Jo Byeong-kyu, Jo Se-ho, Jessi, Kim Seung-hye, Kim Hye-yoon, Hong Hyun-hee, Tak Jae-hoon, Lee Young-ji, Juyeon (The Boyz), Chuu (Loona), Ha Jun-su		
82	February 27	2021 Live And Fall Together: Kim Jong-min (Koyote), Defconn, Jo Byeong-kyu, Jo Se-ho, Jessi, Kim Seung-hye, Kim Hye-yoon, Hong Hyun-hee, Tak Jae-hoon, Lee Young-ji, Juyeon (The Boyz), Chuu (Loona); H&H Corporation: Kim Jong-min (Koyote), Defconn, Hong Hyun-hee, Lee Young-ji		
83	March 6	H&H Corporation: Kim Jong-min (Koyote), Defconn, Hong Hyun-hee, Lee Young-ji, Hur Jae, Heo Ung		
84	March 13	With Yoo: (Note: Yoo travels around Seoul to do anything that people have requested on a second hand market application.) N/A		
85	March 20	With Yoo: N/A		
86	March 27	MSG Wannabe: SG Wannabe, Choi Jung-hoon (Jannabi), Hwang Je-sung, Yang Se-chan, Code Kunst, Do Kyung-wan		
87	April 10	MSG Wannabe: Kim Hae-jun, Park Eun-seok, Kim Bum-soo, K.Will		
88	April 17	MSG Wannabe: Nam Chang-hee, SG Wannabe		
89	April 24	MSG Wannabe: Car, the Garden, Ha Do-kwon		
90	May 1	MSG Wannabe: Do Kyung-wan, Hwang Je-sung, Jee Seok-jin, Lee Sang-yi, Wonstein, Parc Jae-jung, Kim Jung-min, Simon Dominic, Lee Dong-hwi, KCM		
91	May 8	MSG Wannabe: Jee Seok-jin, Lee Sang-yi, Wonstein, Parc Jae-jung, Kim Jung-min, Simon Dominic, Lee Dong-hwi, KCM		
92	May 15	MSG Wannabe: Jee Seok-jin, Lee Sang-yi, Wonstein, Parc Jae-jung, Kim Jung-min, Simon Dominic, Lee Dong-hwi, KCM		
93	May 22	MSG Wannabe: Jee Seok-jin, Lee Sang-yi, Wonstein, Parc Jae-jung, Kim Jung-min, Simon Dominic, Lee Dong-hwi, KCM		
94	May 29	JMT: Lee Yong-jin, Im Won-hee, Jeong Jun-ha		
95	June 5	JMT: Lee Eun-ji, Kwon Oh-joong; MSG Wannabe: Jee Seok-jin, Lee Sang-yi, Wonstein, Parc Jae-jung, Kim Jung-min, Simon Dominic, Lee Dong-hwi, KCM, Ha Jun-su		
96	June 12	MSG Wannabe: Jee Seok-jin, Lee Sang-yi, Wonstein, Parc Jae-jung, Kim Jung-min, Simon Dominic, Lee Dong-hwi, KCM		
97	June 19	MSG Wannabe: Jee Seok-jin, Lee Sang-yi, Wonstein, Parc Jae-jung, Kim Jung-min, Simon Dominic, Lee Dong-hwi, KCM, Park Geun-tae, Brown Eyed Soul (Naul, Youngjun)		
98	June 26	MSG Wannabe: Jee Seok-jin, Lee Sang-yi, Wonstein, Parc Jae-jung, Kim Jung-min, Simon Dominic, Lee Dong-hwi, KCM, Park Geun-tae, Brown Eyed Soul (Naul, Youngjun)		
99	July 3	MSG Wannabe: Jee Seok-jin, Lee Sang-yi, Wonstein, Parc Jae-jung, Kim Jung-min, Simon Dominic, Lee Dong-hwi, KCM, Jeon Yeo-been, Rocoberry		
100	July 10	MSG Wannabe: Jee Seok-jin, Lee Sang-yi, Wonstein, Parc Jae-jung, Kim Jung-min, Simon Dominic, Lee Dong-hwi, KCM, Chani (SF9), Kim Min-ju, Yeji (Itzy), Laboum, V.O.S	Special video appearance by Ed Sheeran	
101	July 17	MSG Wannabe: Jee Seok-jin, Lee Sang-yi, Wonstein, Parc Jae-jung, Kim Jung-min, Simon Dominic, Lee Dong-hwi, KCM, Big Mama, SG Wannabe		
102	August 21	Hangout With Yoo+: Jeong Jun-ha, Haha, Jo Se-ho, Hwang Kwang-hee, Shin Yu-bin, Kim Yeon-ja		
103	August 28	Hangout With Yoo+: Jeong Jun-ha, Haha, Shin Yu-bin, Mijoo (Lovelyz), Lee Hwi-joon; JMT: Shin Gi-ru		
104	September 4	Hangout With Yoo+: Jeong Jun-ha, Haha, Mijoo (Lovelyz), Shin Bong-sun		
105	September 11	Hangout With Yoo+: Jeong Jun-ha, Haha, Mijoo (Lovelyz), Shin Bong-sun	Voice appearance through phone by Hong Jin-kyung	
106	September 18	Hangout With Yoo+: Jeong Jun-ha, Haha, Mijoo (Lovelyz), Shin Bong-sun		
107	September 25	Hangout With Yoo+: Jeong Jun-ha, Haha, Shin Bong-sun, Mijoo (Lovelyz), Han Kun-kyu, Jeong Yeon-sik, Jang Seong-min, Chang Yong-heung, Choi Seong-deok		
108	October 2	Hangout With Yoo+: Jeong Jun-ha, Haha, Shin Bong-sun, Mijoo (Lovelyz)		
109	October 9	Hangout With Yoo+: Jeong Jun-ha, Haha, Shin Bong-sun, Mijoo (Lovelyz)		
110	October 16	Hangout With Yoo+: Jeong Jun-ha, Haha, Shin Bong-sun, Mijoo (Lovelyz), O Yeong-su		
111	October 23	Hangout With Yoo+ + JMT: Jeong Jun-ha, Haha, Shin Bong-sun, Mijoo (Lovelyz), Lee Yong-jin, Lee Eun-ji, Kim Hyun-jung		
112	October 30	Hangout With Yoo+ + JMT: Jeong Jun-ha, Haha, Shin Bong-sun, Mijoo (Lovelyz), Lee Yong-jin, Lee Eun-ji, Kim Hyun-jung		
113	November 6	Hangout With Yoo+: Jeong Jun-ha, Haha, Shin Bong-sun, Mijoo (Lovelyz)		
114	November 13	Hangout With Yoo+: Jeong Jun-ha, Haha, Shin Bong-sun, Mijoo (Lovelyz)		
115	November 20	Hangout With Yoo+: Jeong Jun-ha, Haha, Shin Bong-sun, Mijoo (Lovelyz)		
116	November 27	Acorn Festival: Jeong Jun-ha, Haha, Shin Bong-sun, Mijoo (Lovelyz), Freestyle, Younha, Black Eyed Pilseung, Jeon Goon; JMT: Cha Seung-won		
117	December 4	Acorn Festival: Jeong Jun-ha, Haha, Shin Bong-sun, Mijoo (Lovelyz), Hickee, Yang Jung-seung, Epik High, DOCSKIM, Black Eyed Pilseung, Jeon Goon, Sieun (STAYC)		
118	December 11	Acorn Festival: Jeong Jun-ha, Haha, Shin Bong-sun, Mijoo (Lovelyz), Sunny Hill, Ivy, Black Eyed Pilseung		
119	December 18	Acorn Festival: Haha, Shin Bong-sun, Sung Si-kyung; JMT: Shin Bong-sun		

=== 2022 ===
Episodes 120–166

List of episodes (episode 120–166)

Episode	Broadcast Date	Segment(s) + Guest(s)	Special Appearances by	Ref.
120	January 1	Hangout With Yoo+ - Return of the King: Jeong Jun-ha, Haha, Shin Bong-sun, Mijoo (Lovelyz)		
121	January 8	Hangout With Yoo+ - 2021 MBC Entertainment Awards Behind: Jeong Jun-ha, Haha, Shin Bong-sun, Mijoo (Lovelyz), MSG Wannabe, Lee Hyo-ri; JMT: Jeong Jun-ha, Haha, Lee Mi-joo		
122	January 15	Acorn Festival: Jeong Jun-ha, Haha, Shin Bong-sun, Mijoo (Lovelyz), Sunny Hill, Epik High, Younha	Special video appearance by John Legend	
123	January 22	Acorn Festival: Jeong Jun-ha, Haha, Shin Bong-sun, Mijoo (Lovelyz), Yang Jung-seung, KCM, Ivy, Hickee, Sung Si-kyung		
Jeong Jun-ha, Haha, Shin Bong-sun and Mijoo (Lovelyz) have joined the show as fixed cast members.
124	January 29	Lunar New Year Special - New Year's Bow Special Forces: Song Eun-i, Jee Seok-jin, You Hee-yeol		
125	February 19	First Time?: Jee Seok-jin, Kim Yong-man, Kim Soo-yong		
126	February 26	First Time?: Koo Jun-yup, Don Spike, Hareem, Jee Seok-jin, Kim Yong-man, Kim Soo-yong		
127	March 5	Meeting Shop: N/A		
128	March 12	MBTI Special: Lee Mal-nyeon, Lee Yi-kyung, Lee Sun-bin, Jinyea (Laboum), Jonathan Yiombi		
129	March 19	MBTI Special: Lee Mal-nyeon, Lee Yi-kyung, Lee Sun-bin, Jinyea (Laboum), Jonathan Yiombi		
130	March 26	Noona and I: Jonathan Yiombi, Layone, Lee Kyung-sil, Park Mi-sun, Jo Hye-ryun	Choi Bo-pil (Note: Voice appearance via phone)	
131	April 2	Noona and I: Jo Se-ho, Yang Se-chan, Lee Kyung-sil, Park Mi-sun, Jo Hye-ryun		
132	April 9	Noona and I: Park Joo-mi; WSG Wannabe: You Hee-yeol		
133	April 16	WSG Wannabe: Song Eun-i, Kim Sook		
134	April 23	WSG Wannabe: Kim Sook, Jessi, Gabee		
135	April 30	WSG Wannabe: Kim Sook, Kim Yeon-ja, Kim A-lang		
136	May 7	WSG Wannabe: Kim Sook, Park Ha-sun, Song Eun-i		
137	May 14	WSG Wannabe: Kim Sook		
138	May 21	WSG Wannabe: Kim Sook, Chae Jung-an, Rihey		
139	May 28	WSG Wannabe: Kim Sook, Navi, Jo Hyun-ah (Urban Zakapa), SOLE, Yoon Eun-hye, Kota (Sunny Hill), Eom Ji-yoon, Lee Bo-ram, Hynn, Soyeon (Laboum), Park Jin-joo, Kwon Jin-ah, Jung Ji-so		
140	June 4	WSG Wannabe: Kim Sook, Yoon Eun-hye, Navi, Lee Bo-ram, Kota (Sunny Hill), Jo Hyun-ah (Urban Zakapa), SOLE, Soyeon (Laboum), Eom Ji-yoom, Kwon Jin-ah, Hynn, Jung Ji-so	CocaNButter	
141	June 11	WSG Wannabe: Kim Sook, Brave Brothers, Cho Young-soo		
142	June 18	WSG Wannabe: Kim Sook, Song Eun-i, Yoon Eun-hye, Navi, Lee Bo-ram, Kota (Sunny Hill), Park Jin-joo, Jo Hyun-ah (Urban Zakapa), SOLE, Soyeon (Laboum), Eom Ji-yoon, Kwon Jin-ah, Hynn, Jung Ji-so		
143	June 25	WSG Wannabe: Song Eun-i, Yoon Eun-hye, Navi, Lee Bo-ram, Kota (Sunny Hill), Park Jin-joo, Jo Hyun-ah (Urban Zakapa), SOLE, Soyeon (Laboum), Eom Ji-yoon, Kwon Jin-ah, Hynn, Jung Ji-so, Kim Do-hoon, Seo Yong-bae		
144	July 2	WSG Wannabe: Kim Sook, Yoon Eun-hye, Navi, Kota (Sunny Hill), Park Jin-joo, Jo Hyun-ah (Urban Zakapa), SOLE, Eom Ji-yoon, Kwon Jin-ah, Coach & Sendo, Cho Young-soo, Han Gil, Kassy		
145	July 9	WSG Wannabe: Kim Sook, Yoon Eun-hye, Navi, Lee Bo-ram, Kota (Sunny Hill), Park Jin-joo, Jo Hyun-ah (Urban Zakapa), SOLE, Soyeon (Laboum), Eom Ji-yoon, Kwon Jin-ah, Hynn, Jung Ji-so, Jun Hyun-moo		
146	July 16	WSG Wannabe: Yoon Eun-hye, Navi, Lee Bo-ram, Kota (Sunny Hill), Park Jin-joo, Jo Hyun-ah (Urban Zakapa), SOLE, Soyeon (Laboum), Eom Ji-yoon, Kwon Jin-ah, Hynn, Jung Ji-so		
147	July 23	WSG Wannabe: Yoon Eun-hye, Navi, Lee Bo-ram, Kota (Sunny Hill), Park Jin-joo, Jo Hyun-ah (Urban Zakapa), SOLE, Soyeon (Laboum), Eom Ji-yoon, Kwon Jin-ah, Hynn, Jung Ji-so, Song Eun-i, WJSN, Aespa, Jungwoo (NCT), Kim Min-ju, Yeji (Itzy)		
148	July 30	WSG Wannabe: Kim Sook, Yoon Eun-hye, Navi, Lee Bo-ram, Kota (Sunny Hill), Park Jin-joo, Jo Hyun-ah (Urban Zakapa), SOLE, Soyeon (Laboum), Eom Ji-yoon, Kwon Jin-ah, Hynn, Jung Ji-so, Laboum (Haein, Solbin), Urban Zakapa (Park Yong-in, Kwon Sun-il), Kim Eun-young, Bitna (Sunny Hill), W24, CocaNButter		
149	August 6	WSG Wannabe: Kim Sook, Yoon Eun-hye, Navi, Lee Bo-ram, Kota (Sunny Hill), Park Jin-joo, Jo Hyun-ah (Urban Zakapa), SOLE, Soyeon (Laboum), Eom Ji-yoon, Kwon Jin-ah, Hynn, Jung Ji-so, MSG Wannabe		
Summer Special:WSG Wannabe Director's Cut	August 13	Replaced with a special broadcast due to program reorganization.		
Summer Special: JMT special	August 20	Replaced with a special broadcast due to program reorganization.		
Park Jin-joo and Lee Yi-kyung have joined the show as fixed cast members.
150	September 3	Teacher Yoo Bong-du: N/A		
151	September 10	Slaves Grand Feast 2: N/A		
152	September 17	Unite Together to Knock Off 2: N/A		
153	September 24	Unite Together to Knock Off 2: N/A		
154	October 1	JMT: N/A		
155	October 8	JMT: N/A		
156	October 15	National Sports Day Special: Jo Hye-ryun, Heo Bo-ram		
157	October 22	HWY HR	Im Soo-hyang	
158	October 29	HWY HR	Lee Sung-woo (No Brain)	
No broadcast on November 5 due to the period of mourning after the Seoul Halloween Crowd Crush
159	November 12	Autumn Trip	Yuqi ((G)I-dle)	
160	November 19	Get All Members in the Van: N/A		
161	November 26	World Cup: N/A		
162	December 3	Beggars in Seoul: N/A		
163	December 10	Hangout Restoration Shop: N/A		
164	December 17	Get All Members in the Van: N/A		
165	December 24	Get All Members in the Van: N/A		
166	December 31	Hangout Restoration Shop: Park Na-rae		

=== 2023 ===
Episodes 167-214

List of episodes (episode 168–215)

Episode	Broadcast Date	Segment(s)	Guest(s) + Special Appearance	Ref.
167	January 7	Hangout Restoration Shop + Managers' Day Off	No guest	
168	January 14	Kidnapping of Third-Generation Heir	No guest	
169	January 21	Kidnapping of Third-Generation Heir + National Snack Contest	No guest	
170	January 28	National Snack Contest	No guest	
171	February 4	Winter College Training	No guest	
172	February 11	Winter College Training + Group Jump Rope Retry	No guest	
173	February 18	Hangout with Yoo Investigation Team - Finding CEO Park	Park Sung-woong	
174	February 25	Hangout with Yoo Investigation Team - Finding CEO Park	Park Sung-woong	
175	March 4	Throwaway Entertainment	Jo Se-ho, Nam Chang-Hee, Yoo Byung-jae, Yang Se-hyung, Hwang Kwang-hee	
176	March 11	Throwaway Entertainment	Jo Se-ho, Nam Chang-Hee, Yoo Byung-jae, Yang Se-hyung, Hwang Kwang-hee	
177	March 18	Throwaway Entertainment	Jo Se-ho, Nam Chang-Hee, (Note: This episode would be his final appearance, due to him set to appear on a show at the same broadcast timing as Hangout with Yoo.) Yoo Byung-jae, Yang Se-hyung, Hwang Kwang-hee, Teen Top	
178	March 25	Throwaway Entertainment	Jo Se-ho, Yoo Byung-jae, Yang Se-hyung, Hwang Kwang-hee	
189	April 1	Throwaway Entertainment	Jo Se-ho, Yoo Byung-jae, Yang Se-hyung, Hwang Kwang-hee	
180	April 8	National Snack Contest	Yoo Byung-jae	
181	April 15	Teacher Yoo Bong-du	Gaya-G (WSG Wannabe), Soyeon (Laboum), Lee Bo-ram (Seeya), Jung Ji-so, Hynn, Zior Park	
182	April 22	Hangout with Yoo on Jeju Island	Joo Woo-jae	
183	April 29	Hangout with Yoo on Jeju Island	Joo Woo-jae	
184	May 6	Treasure Hunt		
185	May 13	Special Breakfast	Yoo Byung-jae	
186	May 20	Special Breakfast; Variety Show Parents	Yoo Byung-jae, Jee Seok-jin, Lee Sung-mi	
187	May 27	Variety Show Parents	Lee Kyung-kyu, Lee Yoon-seok	
188	June 3	Just the Two of Us	No guest	
189	June 10	One Grain of Millet	Jo Se-ho	(Note: Jeong Jun-ha and Shin Bong-sun's last episode as fixed cast members.)
No broadcast for 2 weeks due to the show's reorganization. Joo Woo-jae joins the show as a fixed cast member.
190	July 1	The New Member and New Friends	No guest	
191	July 8	Just a Mission Away from Home	Yun Sung-bin, Ha Song	
192	July 15	A Day in the Life of a Salesperson	No guest	
193	July 22	A Day in the Life of a Salesperson	Moon Ji-in, Kim Joo-hun, Hani, Oh Man-seok, Hoshi (Seventeen)	
194	July 29	2023 University Rural Volunteering	No guest	
195	August 5	The Fourth Anniversary	No guest	
196	August 12	Teacher Yoo Bong-du	No guest	
197	August 19	National Snack Contest	No guest	
198	August 26	Get All Members in the Van Returns	No guest	
199	September 2	Hangout on Thursday	No guest	
200	September 9	Hangout in Seoul I	No guest	
201	September 16	Hangout in Seoul II	Bibi	
202	September 23	Hangout with Yoo Autumn Songs Concert	Noel (band), Yoon Min-soo (Vibe), Jang Hye-jin	
No broadcast for 2 weeks due to 2023 Asian Games.
203	October 14	The Cast Joins "My Dearest"	Namgoong Min, Ahn Eun-jin	
204	October 21	JS Entertainment Reopens	Daesung (BigBang)	
205	October 28	JS Entertainment - JuJu Secret Records Their Comeback	Daesung (BigBang), Kim Jong-min (Koyote)	
206	November 4	JS Entertainment - One Top Debut Song and Choreography	BANK TWO BROTHERS, Kim Jong-min (Koyote)	
207	November 11	JS Entertainment	Ko Kyu-pil, Young K (Day6)	
208	November 18	JS Entertainment: One Top Recording and Final Member Announcement	Ryan S. Jhun, Sunwoo Jung-a, Young K (Day6), Kim Jong-min (Koyote)	
209	November 25	JS Entertainment	Young K (Day6), Kim Jong-min (Koyote), (Dancer) Feeldog, Deegun, Gi.Seok, Reckless, HYU, GOF, JRoc, BusyBe	
210	December 2	JS Entertainment	Young K (Day6), Kim Jong-min (Koyote), (Dancer) Feeldog, Deegun, Gi.Seok, Reckless, HYU, GOF, JRoc, BusyBe, KINKY	
211	December 9	JS Entertainment	Young K (Day6), Kim Jong-min (Koyote), (Dancer) Feeldog, Deegun, Gi.Seok, Reckless, HYU, GOF, JRoc, BusyBe, KINKY	
212	December 16	A Day in Life: Kim Suk-hoon	Kim Suk-hoon	
213	December 23	Christmas Present	Ko Kyu-pil	
214	December 30	Good Deeds Co., Ltd.	Kim Jong-min (Koyote)	

=== 2024 ===
Episodes 215-261

List of episodes (episode 215-261)

Episode	Broadcast Date	Segment(s)	Guest(s) + Special Appearance	Ref.
216	January 6	Good Deeds Co., Ltd.	Kim Jong-min	
216	January 6	2024 New Year Party	Song I-ji	
216	January 13	A Day in Life: Kim Suk-hoon Part 2	Kim Suk-hoon	
217	January 20	Hangout Restoration Shop	No guest	
218	January 27	Sunday Excursion Part. 1	Kim Jong-min	
219	February 3	Sunday Excursion Part. 2	Kim Jong-min	
219	February 3	What are you doing being alone on Lunar New Year's Day? Part. 1	Jessi	
220	February 10	What are you doing being alone on Lunar New Year's Day? Part. 2	Jessi	
220	February 10	Kwang-kyu's solo that shines during the Lunar New Year's special	Kim Kwang-kyu	
221	February 17	Half-day Tour	Changmo	
221	February 17	Work After A Half Day Part. 1	No guest	
222	February 24	Work After A Half Day Part. 2	No guest	
223	March 2	Work After A Half Day Part. 3	No guest	
223	March 2	Housewarming Party	Kim Kwang-kyu	
224	March 9	A Grain of Millet	Kim Soo Yong	
225	March 16	Sukhoon, your hometown	Kim Suk-hoon, Im Woo-il	
226	March 23	Play Together, Spring	MC Seop	
227	March 30	Play Together, Spring	OZMSR, Lovelyz, Kim Tae-woo	
228	April 6	Investigation Team Leader 2024	Lee Je-hoon, Lee Dong-hwi, Choi Woo-sung, Yoon Hyun-soo	
229	April 13	Investigation Team Leader 2024	Lee Je-hoon, Lee Dong-hwi	
230	April 20	Mt. Mindung returned the favor	Kim Kwang-kyu	
231	April 27	What a day (Exploring Seoul with the Return of Mr. Trash Man (Kim Suk-hoon) & visit to HYBE cafeteria)	Kim Suk-hoon, BSS, Lee Hyun	
232	May 4	Family Spring Picnic	Kim Kwang-kyu, Kim Jong-min, Young K (Day6), Jessi	
233	May 11	Play Together, Spring	Lovelyz, Im Won-hee, zeonpasangsa	
234	May 18	Newborn Special	Young K (Day6), Seungkwan (Seventeen & BSS)	
235	May 25	Newborn Special	Seungkwan (Seventeen & BSS)	
235	May 25	Our Own Festival	SHINee	
236	June 1	Our Own Festival	Im Won-hee, zeonpasangsa, Kang Jin	
237	June 8	Hangout with Yoo Flea Market	Kim Suk-hoon, zeonpasangsa, Jo Se-ho, Kim Yong-jun (SG Wannabe), Lee Joo-yeon, Sowon	
238	June 15	Hangout Agency	DinDin & 10cm	
239	June 22	Hangout with Yoo's 2024 Our Own Festival (MC: Yoo Jae-suk & Haha)	Rehearsal: 1. zeonpasangsa 2. DAY6; 3. SHINee; 4. Jessi; 5. Dynamicduo; 6. OZMSR; 7. Kim Tae-woo x Kkokko Starr (Ms. Ki Chae-ok); 8. Lovelyz; 9. Kang Jin; 10. RGP; 11. Joo Woo-jae & Park Jin-joo; Performance: 1. OZMSR; 2. RGP; 3. Dynamicduo; 4. Joo Woo-jae & Park Jin-joo; 5. Kim Tae-woo; 6. Kim Tae-woo x Kkokko Starr (Ms. Ki Chae-ok)	
240	June 29	Hangout with Yoo's 2024 Our Own Festival (MC: Yoo Jae-suk & Haha)	Performance: 1. Jessi; 2. zeonpasangsa 3. zeonpasangsa ft. Lee Yi-kyung; 4. Kang Jin; 5. Lovelyz; 6. DAY6; 7. SHINee	1. DAY6; 2. SHINee
241	July 6	A Trip to Okcheon,	DinDin, Lee Yoon-ji (Lee Mijoo sister)	
242	July 13	24 Hour Relay Labour	Byul	
243	July 21	24 Hour Relay Labour	No guest	
244	August 17	Team Korea Archers	Archers Athlete Lim Si-hyeon, Jeon Hun-young, Nam Su-hyeon, Kim Je-deok, Lee Woo-seok, Kim Woo-jin	
245	August 24	Recovery Haha's Name	HYB Huh Gak, Shin Yong-jae, Onestar	
246	August 31	Joon Bin's Plan	DinDin, Kwaktube	
247	September 7	Street and Zoo Cleaning	Kim Suk-hoon	
248	September 14	Chuseok Quiz Show	Ha Dream(HaHa son), Lee Yoon-ji(Mijoo sister), Park Yu-na(Jinjoo sister), Lee Min-ha(Yi-kyung sister), Kim Jong-min	
249	September 21	The Smile Jumper Woo Sang Hyeok	Woo Sang-hyeok	
250	September 28	HY Chorus	Jin Sung	
251	October 5	A Meal in the Countryside	Lee Sang-yi	
252	October 12	Delivery Service	No guest	
253	October 19	Invigorating Autumn Dishes	Kim Kwang-kyu, Chef Eun Young	
254	October 26	Hongcheon Follow-up	Patricia Yiombi	
255	November 2	Kimchi Making Day with Masters	DinDin, Chef Lee Mi Young	
256	November 9	Hangout with Yoo Flea Market	Jo Se-ho, KCM (singer), Woo Sang-hyeok, Joon Park, Jung Hyuk, Song Hae Na,	
257	November 16	Outing at the End of Autum	Kim Suk-hoon	
258	November 23	Waking up and Preparing for Winter	Kim Suk-hoon	
259	November 30	After Sale Service Special	KCM (singer)	
260	December 23	Hangout Fashion Show	Bae Jung Nam, Kang Chul Woong	
261	December 28	The Year End Party	DinDin, Kim Jong-min, Kim Suk-hoon, Kim Kwang-kyu, Hwang Ga Ram (Pinocchio (band))	

=== 2025 ===
Episodes 262-310

List of episodes (episode 263-310)

Episode	Broadcast Date	Segment(s)	Guest(s) + Special Appearance by	Ref.
Special Episode	January 4	What's New Special	No Guest	(Note: The episodes ‘ Bukhansan Shoulder Delivery ’, ‘ Gangwon-do Courier Delivery ’, and ‘ Bagel Store Part-timer ’ were aired.)
262	January 11	2025 Winter Song	Ailee, John Park, KCM, Haewon (Nmixx), Song Geon-hee, Oh Sang-uk, Seong Heon-ssu, Johan Kim	
263	January 18	2025 Winter Song	Ailee, John Park, KCM, Haewon (Nmixx), Song Geon-hee, Oh Sang-uk, Seong Heon-ssu, Johan Kim	
264	January 25	Winter Camp	Ailee, John Park, KCM, Haewon (Nmixx), Song Geon-hee, Oh Sang-uk, Seong Heon-ssu, Johan Kim	
265	February 1	Please Cook Our Fish	KCM, Chef Shin Kye-sook, Chef Jo Seo-hyung	
266	February 8	People on the Clock During Lunar New Year	No guest	
267	February 15	The Gourmet Road	Shim Eun-kyung, Yutaka Matsushige	
268	February 22	The Solitary Gourmet	Shim Eun-kyung, Yutaka Matsushige, KCM	
269	March 1	Deodeok Hunters to Awaken Hibernation	Kim Suk-hoon	
270	March 8	Lee Kyung-kyu's Home Appliances of Conscience	Lee Kyung-kyu	
271	March 15	I Am Going To A Temple	KCM, Heo Kyung-hwan	
272	March 22	Inspector Yu's Sudden Attack	Jo Se-ho, DinDin, Jo Hye-ryun, Jeong Ga-eun, Monday Kiz, Sleepy, Ken, Im Woo-il, Nam Chang-Hee, Jo Ji Hwan, Park Gwang Jae, Lee Gyu Ho, Hwang Dong-Hyun (Don Mills), Patricia Yiombi, Kang Chul Woong, Baek Seung-heon (Feellikefeel), Hee Jae	
273	March 29	My Friend's Table	Oh Sang-uk, Im Woo-il	
274	April 5	Lee Kyung-kyu's Coming Part 2	Lee Kyung-kyu	
275	April 12	Spring Webfoot Octopus	Im Woo-il, Lee Yeon-bok, Jung Ho Young	
276	April 19	Good Deeds and Warm Hearts	Im Woo-il, Park Gwang Jae	
277	April 26	Helping Parents Online Continues	Im Woo-il, Park Gwang Jae	
278	May 3	Ginseng Hunt in Hongcheon	Im Woo-il, Im Won-hee	
279	May 10	Family Month and Hong Kong Delivery Mission	Im Woo-il, Im Won-hee	
280	May 17	Fishing Day and a Date in Hong Kong	KCM, Chef Eun Young	
281	May 24	Meeting Eun Kyung In Japan	Shim Eun-kyung	
282	May 31	Farewell Joo-Joo Sisters	No guest	(Note: Lee Mi Joo and Park Jin-joo's last episode as fixed cast members.)
283	June 7	The Great Wardrobe Blowout Sale	Kim Suk-hoon, Jee Seok-jin, Kim Sook	
284	June 14	Happiness in Ten Dollars	Im Woo-il	
285	June 21	Airport Suitcase Showdown	No guest	
286	June 28	The Broadcast Station Vacation Begins	Han Sang-jin	
287	July 5	Figurine Clearance Mayhem	Kwon Il-yong, Jung Jae-hyung, Byul	
288	July 12	Park Myung Soo Returns	Park Myung-soo	
289	July 19	The Non-Popular Celebrity Club	Jang Hang-jun, Tukutz (Epik High), Heo Kyung-hwan	
290	July 26	The 80s MBC Seoul Song Festival	Jin Sung	
291	August 2	The 80s MBC Seoul Song Festival	Park Yeong-gyu, Noh Sa-yeon, Park Myung-soo, Yoo Hee-kwan, Im Woo-il	
292	August 9	Unpopular People's Gathering	Jeong Jun-ha, Han Sang-jin, Heo Sung-tae	
293	August 16	A Day Decided by AI	Heo Kyung-hwan	
294	August 23	The 80s MBC Seoul Song Festival	Park Myung-soo, Yoon Do-hyun, Lee Juck, Ha Dong-kyun, Woodz, Park Yeong-gyu, Choi Jung-hoon (Jannabi), Jung Sung-hwa, RALRAL, Solar (Mamamoo), Liz (Ive), Lee Yong-jin, DinDin, Choi Yu-ree, Lee Jun-young	(Note: All 15 finalists appeared.)
295	August 30	The 80s MBC Seoul Song Festival	Kim Hee-ae	
296	September 6	The 80s MBC Seoul Song Festival	Lee Juck, Jung Sung-hwa, Ha Dong-kyun, Lee Yong-jin, Solar (MAMAMOO), DinDin, RALRAL, Song Eun-i, Kim Sook	
297	September 13	The 80s MBC Seoul Song Festival	Park Myung-soo, Ha Dong-kyun, WOODZ, Park Young-gyu, Choi Jung-hoon (Jannabi), Jung Sung-hwa, RALRAL, Solar (MAMAMOO), Liz (IVE), Lee Yong-jin, Choi Yu-ree, Lee Juck, Lee Jun-young, Yoon Do-hyun	(Note: DinDin was absent)
298	September 20	The 80s MBC Seoul Song Festival	Park Myung-soo, Ha Dong-kyun, WOODZ, Park Young-gyu, Choi Jung-hoon (Jannabi), Jung Sung-hwa, RALRAL, Solar (MAMAMOO), Liz (IVE), Lee Yong-jin, Choi Yu-ree, Lee Juck, Lee Jun-young, Yoon Do-hyun, Kim Hee-ae	(Note: DinDin was absent)
299	September 27	The 80s MBC Seoul Song Festival	Yoon Do-hyun, Solar (MAMAMOO), Jung Sung-hwa, Liz (IVE), WOODZ, Park Young-gyu, Ha Dong-kyun, Kim Hee-ae, Byun Jin-sub, Jang Hang-jun, Kim Moon jung, Han Young-ae, Nam Tae-jung	
300	October 4	The 80s MBC Seoul Song Festival	Choi Yu-ree, Lee Yong-jin with RALRAL, Choi Jung-hoon (Jannabi), Park Myung-soo, DinDin, Lee Jun-young, Song Eun-i with Kim Sook, Lee Juck, Yoon Do-hyun, Solar (MAMAMOO), Jung Sung-hwa, Liz (IVE), WOODZ, Park Young-gyu, Ha Dong-kyun, Kim Hee-ae, Byun Jin-sub, Jang Hang-jun, Kim Moon jung, Han Young-ae, Nam Tae-jung	
301	October 11	Chuseok Special Chuseok Feast	Park Myung-soo, Park Young-gyu, Choi Jung-hoon (Jannabi), RALRAL, Solar (MAMAMOO), Liz (IVE), Lee Yong-jin, Choi Yu-ree, Lee Juck, DinDin, Lee Jun-young	(Note: Yoon Do-hyun, Jung Sung-hwa, Ha Dong-kyun, and Woodz were absent.)
302	October 18	Non-Popular Celebrities Club (NPCC)	Choi Hongman, Hyun Bong-sik, Hwang Kwang-hee	
303	October 25	•Comma Club Fall Gathering: The 1st Comma Club Gathering •Non-Popular Celebrities Club (NPCC)	Ha Dong-kyun, Heo Kyung-hwan, Kim Kwang-kyu	
304	November 8	Non-Popular Celebrities Club (NPCC):Verified lineup	Heo Seong-tae, Hyun Bong-sik , DJ Tukutz , Han Sang-jin , Heo Kyung-hwan , Choi Hong-man, Kim Kwang-kyu, and Jeong Jun-ha	
305	November 22	Non-Popular Celebrities Club (NPCC):Popularity competition	Heo Seong-tae, Hyun Bong-sik , DJ Tukutz , Han Sang-jin , Heo Kyung-hwan , Choi Hong-man, Kim Kwang-kyu, and Jeong Jun-ha	
306	November 29	The great admiral Yi Su-Sin	Heo Kyung-hwan, Yoo Hong-jun, Kim Mi-kyung	
307	December 6	Non-Popular Celebrities Club (NPCC): Popularity competition	Heo Seong-tae, Hyun Bong-sik , DJ Tukutz , Han Sang-jin , Heo Kyung-hwan , Choi Hong-man, Kim Kwang-kyu, and Jeong Jun-ha	
308	December 13	Non-Popular Celebrities Club (NPCC):Surprise interviews	Heo Seong-tae, Hyun Bong-sik , DJ Tukutz , Han Sang-jin , Heo Kyung-hwan , Choi Hong-man, Kim Kwang-kyu, and Jeong Jun-ha	
309	December 20	Non-Popular Celebrities Club (NPCC):Fan Meeting D-7	Heo Seong-tae, Hyun Bong-sik , DJ Tukutz , Han Sang-jin , Heo Kyung-hwan , Choi Hong-man, Kim Kwang-kyu, and Jeong Jun-ha	
310	December 27	Non-Popular Celebrities Club (NPCC):Fan Meeting D-Day	Heo Seong-tae, Hyun Bong-sik , DJ Tukutz , Han Sang-jin , Heo Kyung-hwan , Choi Hong-man, Kim Kwang-kyu, and Jeong Jun-ha	

=== 2026 ===
Episodes 311-present

List of episodes (episode 311-present)

Episode	Broadcast Date	Segment(s)	Guest(s) + Special Appearance	Ref.
311	January 3	Happy New Year greeting	Lee Kyung-kyu, Heo Kyung-hwan, Kim Min-jung	
312	January 10	Kim Kwang-kyu's 60th birthday party	Kim Kwang-kyu, Heo Kyung-hwan	
313	January 17	Comma Club 2nd Meeting:Winter Meeting.	Jeong Jun-ha, Heo Kyung-hwan	
314	January 24	Let's Play Together:Jeju Island Special Course	Choi Hong-man, Kim Kwang-kyu, Heo Kyung-hwan	
315	January 31	Delivery of Fun Winter in Hongcheon	Heo Kyung-hwan	
316	February 7	It's Dangerous Outside the Blankets	Kim Kwang-kyu, Heo Kyung-hwan, Jang Ho-jun	
317	February 14	Comma Club Gangwon-do:Park Myung-soo, a new member Comma Club	Park Myung-soo, Jeong Jun-ha, Heo Kyung-hwan	
318	February 21	Comma Club After Seollal	Park Myung-soo, Jeong Jun-ha, Heo Kyung-hwan	
319	February 28	The Golden Age of Coutry Bumpkins: War of Money	Heo Kyung-hwan, Yang Sang-guk	
Heo Kyung-hwan have joined the show as fixed cast member.
320	March 14	A Days with AI	Kim Kwang-kyu	
321	March 21	War of Money 2	Yang Sang-guk	
322	March 28	Eat and Lose Weight Gathering	Lee Yong-jin, Ralral	
323	April 4	Crown Prince Gimhae’s Housekeeping	Yang Sang-guk	
324	April 11	Comma Club: Byun Woo-seok finally encounters the imposter	Byeon Woo-seok; Jeong Jun-ha	
325	April 18	We Will Do Anything for You	Jeong Jun-ha	
325	April 18	War of Money 3 in Tongyeong	Yang Sang-guk	
326	April 25	War of Money 3 in Tongyeong	Yang Sang-guk	
327	May 2	Short Drama Project	Kim Suk-hoon; Kim Sung-kyun	
328	May 9	Short Drama Project	Jeong Jun-ha; Kim Suk-hoon; Baek Ji-young; Kim Sung-kyun	
329	May 16	War of Money 4 in Changwon	Yang Sang-guk; Lee Seon-Min	
330	May 23	Obey the King's Command: The Day of King Sejong the Great		
331	May 30	Eat and Lose Weight Gathering	Jeong Jun-ha; Lee Yong-jin	
332	June 6	The Golden Age of Coutry Bumpkins: War of Money	Yunho; Gwak Beom	
333	June 13	Lee Kyung-kyu goes Healthy	Lee Kyung-kyu; Lee Yoon-seok	
334	June 20	Short Drama Project: OST	Kim Won-hoon; Girls' Generation-HRS (Hyoyeon, Kwon Yu-ri, Choi Soo-young)	
335	June 27	Whistle Rider	Jeong Jun-ha; Park Young-jin	
336	July 4	Hangout with Yoo Diary	Gwak Beom	
337	July 11	War of Money in Gumi	Lee Seon-Min, Yang Sang-guk	
338	July 18	War of Money in Gumi	Lee Seon-Min, Yang Sang-guk	
338	July 18	Let's Play Together	Kim Kwang-kyu	
339	July 25	Hangout with Yoo Diary	Gwak Beom, Kim Won-hoon	
340	August 1	Short Drama Project	Gwak Beom, Gong Hyo-jin, Jung Joon-won, Kim Won-hee	
341	August 8	Comma Club	Jeong Jun-ha, Jung Ji-seon	
342	August 15		Jeong Jun-ha, Park Young-jin	
