= Kai (singer, born 1981) =

South Korean singer and actor (born 1981)

- Born: Jung Ki-yeol; December 5, 1981 (age 44); Seoul, South Korea
- Education: Seoul National University
- Occupations: Singer; musical actor
- Musical career
- Genres: Classical; classical crossover; popera
- Years active: 2002–present
- Label: EMK

Korean name
- Hangul: 정기열
- RR: Jeong Giyeol
- MR: Chŏng Kiyŏl

Jung Ki-yeol (Korean: 정기열; born December 5, 1981), known professionally as Kai (카이), is a South Korean singer and musical theatre actor. He is a classically trained baritone best known in musical theatre and has starred in Korean productions of A Tale of Two Cities, The Three Musketeers, Phantom, Jekyll & Hyde and Les Misérables. Outside of musical theatre, Kai has appeared as a panelist on various singing variety shows such as King of Mask Singer and was host of the classical music show Music of the World on KBS Classic FM.

== Early life and education ==
Kai grew up in a musical home and began singing as a child at a local children's choir. He attended Seoul Arts High School and graduated from Seoul National University where he majored in voice. He continued with graduate studies at his alma mater after completing his mandatory military service. In 2009, he completed his master's degree and wrote his thesis on the music of Modest Musorgsky.

== Career ==
=== Early career ===
Despite having an academic background in classical music, Kai decided to pursue a career in the classical crossover genre, which was still relatively new in South Korea at that time. In a 2009 interview, Kai stated that he had shocked his professors and was met with opposition from most of them when he announced his intention to be a crossover singer rather than pursue a career in opera, as many of his peers had done. His decision was influenced by his professor, retired tenor Park In-soo, whose 1989 hit duet "Nostalgia" (향수) with folk singer Lee Dong-won is considered to be one of the earliest commercially successful classical crossover Korean songs; Park himself was expelled by the Korea National Opera and ostracized by the domestic classical music community after the song was released due to the staunch conservative and segregationist attitudes still prevalent at that time.

Kai split his time between performing popular music at various festivals and standard classical opera repertoire at concert halls in an attempt to challenge the prevailing perception that classically trained singers would lose their singing skills if they dabbled in popular music. He gained wider public recognition after featuring as a guest artist at the 2009 nation-wide concert tour of renowned Korean operatic soprano Sumi Jo. Up until then, he had performed under the name "Kyul" (결), a portmanteau of his given name. Jo suggested "Kai" for his stage name as it was easier for non-Korean audiences to pronounce and he has used it ever since.

In addition to performing, Kai also released a number of singles and albums and done guest vocals for other artists. For his 2009 maxi single, he collaborated with veteran K-pop composer and producer Kim Hyung-suk, known for his work with J. Y. Park among others, to produce original material rather than the common practice of reinterpreting traditional classical crossover repertoire. He released his first full-length studio album I AM KAI in March 2011 and it debuted at #92 on the Gaon Album Chart and rose to peak at #26 within three weeks. His releases have also topped the domestic classical charts, making him one of the earliest crossover artists to have charted in both the classical and Gaon charts simultaneously.

=== Musical theater ===
Kai made his musical theatre debut in the 2011 production of The Story of My Life. At that time, there were relatively few classically trained singers active in musical theater, with fellow Seoul National University voice majors Ryu Jeong-han and Kim So-hyun being the two most prolific and well-known. Most musical actors and actresses were either pop singers or trained actors who later received vocal training.

Kai has been cast as authoritarian or "lofty" characters due to his powerful voice and starred as the protagonist in the Korean productions of many notable musicals, including A Tale of Two Cities, Phantom, The Three Musketeers and The Count of Monte Cristo. In 2017, he won critical acclaim and recognition for his roles as the eponymous character in the world premiere of Ben Hur, a Korean musical adaption of Ben-Hur: A Tale of the Christ, and as Crown Prince Rudolf in Rudolf (promoted in Korea as The Last Kiss). He was cast as King Arthur in the 2019 Seoul premiere of the Korean adaptation of Excalibur, which won rave reviews from both critics and audiences and was one of the best-selling musicals that year; due to its popularity, the musical was brought back in 2021 and Kai was one of several original cast members who returned. In late 2020 he was cast in the musical adaptation of The Sorrows of Young Werther and was nominated for Best Lead Actor at the 5th Korean Musical Awards.

=== Other activities ===
From 2010 to 2014, Kai was a DJ on KBS Classic FM's popular classical music show 세상의 모든 음악 (ko) (Music of the World), the South Korean equivalent of BBC Radio 3. He has also participated in singing variety shows such as Immortal Songs: Singing the Legend, the second season of I Am a Singer and King of Mask Singer. From 2017 to 2021 he was a regular panelist on King of Mask Singer as one of five "music specialists".

Outside of musical theater and concerts, Kai has performed at various Korea Tourism Organization-sponsored events throughout Asia to promote Korean musicals as a potential attraction for visiting tourists. He received a commendation from the Ministry of Culture, Sports and Tourism for his work.

== Discography ==
=== Albums ===
#	Title	Album details	Peak positions^{1}		Sales
#	Title	Album details	KOR Weekly	KOR Monthly	Sales
1	I AM KAI	Released: March 23, 2011; Label: Decca, Universal Music Korea; Format: CD, digital download; Track listing: 1. In the Name of Love; 2. I Believe; 3. Break-up Came Beforehand; 4. Did I Not Love You; 5. Punishment; 6. When I Close My Eyes; 7. Love Will Find the Lover; 8. This Is the Moment; 9. Winter Letter; 10. A Thousand Winds; 11. The Way of the Sun (with Kim Jae-hyung); 12. Nella Fantasia; 13. I Believe (duet with Sohyang); 14. You Raise Me Up	26	82	KOR: 1,797+
2	Kai in Italy	Released: October 15, 2014; Label: Mirroball Music; Format: CD, digital download; Track listing: 1. O Sole Mio; 2. Lei (She); 3. Volare; 4. 'A vucchella 5. Parla Piu Piano; 6. Non Ti Scordar Di Me; 7. Con Te Partiro	34	—	
3	Kai in Korea	Released: October 29, 2019; Label: EMK Entertainment; Format: CD, digital download; Track listing: 1. On My Way To You; 2. Inside Me, Flower; 3. Arrirang For You; 4. Bluebird; 5. Sad Love; 6. Missing Home (Tribute to Maestro Insu Park); 7. Promise Me; 8. The Beautiful World			
4	Kai on Musical	Released: August 16, 2022; Label: EMK Entertainment; Format: CD, digital download; Track listing: 1. Readiness; 2. The Butterfly; 3. Before The Summer Ends; 4. All I Do (duet with Ok Joo Hyun); 5. Where In The World; 6. Home (duet with Ji-Hye Lee); 7. Maybe (duet with Sunah Jeong); 8. I Will Be There (duet with Lina); 9. The Man I Used To Be; 10. Hell To Your Doorstep; 11. The Steps of Tomorrow; 12. Something More (duet with Sohyang Kim); 13. Golgotha; 14. The Light of Catacombs (duet with Ivy); 15. Destiny; 16. I Am The Monster; 17. The Other Side of the World (duet with Jeong Won Choi); 18. In Your Dreams (Korean Ver.); 19. We Are (duet with Mi Do Jeon); 20. What If I Cannot Walk Away Reprise; 21. Die Schatten Werden Laenger (duet with Dokyeom (DK)); 22. Gott Warum (Korean Ver.); 23. The Chalice and the Blade; 24. What Does It Mean To Be A King; 25. This Is The Moment (Korean Ver.); 26. Gott Warum (German Ver.); 27. In Your Dreams (Japanese Ver.); 28. This Is The Moment (English Ver.)			

=== Maxi singles ===
#	Title	Album details	Notes/Ref.
1	미완(未完)	Released: April 28, 2008; Label: LOEN Entertainment; Format: CD, digital download; Track listing: 1. 월하연(月下緣) (feat. 전소영); 2. 어린사랑; 3. 그대에게로	
2	Edgewalker	Released: December 8, 2009; Label: Universal Music Korea; Format: CD, digital download; Track listing: 1. 벌 2. You Raise Me Up; 3. 벌 (instrumental); 4. You Raise Me Up (instrumental)	
3	Clad Meets Piano	Released: February 2, 2010; Label: Universal Music Korea; Format: CD, digital download; Track listing: 1. 이별이 먼저 와 있다 (feat. Jeong Jae-il on the piano); 2. 겨울에 쓰는 편지; 3. 이별이 먼저 와 있다 (instrumental); 4. 겨울에 쓰는 편지 (instrumental)	

=== Soundtrack and singles contributions ===
Year	Track	Album	Notes/Ref.
2009	눈물	Can't Stop Now OST	
2010	운명의 연인에게 (Did I Not Love You) (Secret Garden ft. Kai)	Non album single	
2010	운명의 연인에게 (Did I Not Love You) (Secret Garden ft. Kai)	With Special Guests (Korean Special Edition)	
2010	그대 내게 다시 (Jeon Jae-duck with Kai)	A-LIVE Vol.1 김형석의 다락방	

== Theater ==
Year	English title	Korean title	Role	Ref.
2012–2013	A Tale of Two Cities	두 도시 이야기	Charles Darnay	
2014	Dracula	드라큘라	Jonathan Harker	
2014–2015	Marie Antoinette	마리 앙투아네트	Axel von Fersen the Younger	
2015–2021	Phantom	유령	Phantom	
2016	The Three Musketeers	삼총사	D'Artagnan	
2016	Jack the Ripper	잭 더 리퍼	Daniel	
2016–2021	The Count of Monte Cristo	몬테 크리스토 백작	Edmond Dantès, The Count of Monte Cristo	
2017–2018	Rudolf	더 라스트 키스	Crown Prince Rudolf of Austria	
2017–2019	Ben-Hur	벤허	Ben-Hur	
2018–2022	Frankenstein	프랑켄슈타인	Henry Dupre/Monster	
2019–2020	Rebecca	레베카	Maxim de Winter	
2019–2021	Excalibur	엑스칼리버	King Arthur	
2021–2022	Jekyll & Hyde	지킬앤하이드	Dr. Henry Jekyll/Mr. Edward Hyde	
2023	Beethoven	베토벤	Beethoven	
2023–2024	Les Misérables	레 미제라블	Inspector Javert	

== Awards and nominations ==
=== Vocal competitions ===
- 2002: Schubert Society of Korea Competition – consolation prize (semi-finalist)
- 2007: Dong-a Music Competition – 3rd place, voice (male)
- 2009: Osaka International Music Competition (jp) – 3rd place, voice/opera category

=== Musical theater ===
Year	Award	Category	Nominated work	Result	Ref.
2012	18th Korea Musical Awards (ko)	Best Male Newcomer	A Tale of Two Cities	Won	
2017	9th Seoul Success Award	Daesang (Grand Prize) / Musical Actor of the Year	Ben-Hur	Won	
2018	2nd Korea Musical Awards (ko)	Best Lead Actor	Ben-Hur	Nominated	
2021	5th Korea Musical Awards	Best Lead Actor	Werther	Nominated	
