= Oh! My Baby =

- Official poster
- Genre: Reality television
- Starring: Im Hyo-sung; Shoo; Baek Do-bin; Jung Si Ah; Jung Tae-woo; Jang In-hee; Lee Chun-soo; Shim Ha-eun; Cho Yeon-woo; Cha Se-won
- Country of origin: South Korea
- Original language: Korean
- No. of episodes: 125

Production
- Production location: South Korea
- Running time: 70 minutes

Original release
- Network: SBS
- Release: October 31, 2013 (pilot), January 13, 2014 – August 20, 2016

Oh! My Baby (Korean: 오! 마이 베이비) was a South Korean reality television show that aired on SBS every Saturday at 17:05 beginning January 13, 2014. Under a comedic premise, it documents the family life of various South Korean celebrities and their young children. On August 8, 2016, sources confirmed that SBS canceled the show after two years due to low ratings. The final episode aired on August 20, 2016.

== Starring Families ==
Duration	Adults	Children
	Im Hyo-sung (father); Former professional basketball player	Im Yoo (son); Im Ra-hee (daughter); Im Ra-yul (daughter)
	Shoo (mother); Former singer, member of S.E.S.	Im Yoo (son); Im Ra-hee (daughter); Im Ra-yul (daughter)
	Baek Do-bin (father); Actor	Baek Jun-woo (son); Baek Seo-woo (daughter)
	Jung Si-ah (mother); Actress	Baek Jun-woo (son); Baek Seo-woo (daughter)
	Jung Tae-woo (father); Actor	Jung Ha-jun (son); Jung Ha-rin (son)
	Jang In-hee (mother)	Jung Ha-jun (son); Jung Ha-rin (son)
Episodes 119–126	Lee Chun-soo (father); Professional football player	Lee Ju-eun (daughter)
Episodes 119–126	Shim Ha-eun (mother); University lecturer	Lee Ju-eun (daughter)
	Cho Yeon-woo (father); Actor	Cho Yi-an (son)
	Cha Se-won (mother)	Cho Yi-an (son)

== Past families ==
- Lee Eun (mother)
- Mir (uncle), Go Eun Ah (aunt), Jo Ha Jin (nephew)
- Choi Ro-woon (5 years old)
- Shin Goo
- Im Hyun-sik (grandfather), Kim Ju-hwan (grandchild, 5 years old)
- Im Ha-ryong (grandfather), Im So Hyun (grandchild, 6 years old)
- Kang Leo (father), Park Seon-ju (mother), Kang Sol Amy (daughter, 3 years old)
- Kim Jung-min (father), Rumiko Tani (mother), Kim Tae-yang (eldest son, 10 years old), Kim Do-yoon (second son, 9 years old), Kim Dam-yool (third son, 4 years old)
- Kim Tae-woo (father), Kim Ae-ri (mother), Kim So-yul (eldest daughter, 5 years old), Kim Ji-yul (second daughter, 4 years old), Kim Hae-yul (son, 2 years old)
- Son Jun-ho (father), Kim So-hyun (mother), Son Joo-ahn (son, 5 years old)
- Ricky Kim (father), Ryu Seung-joo (mother), Kim Tae-rin (daughter), Kim Tae-oh (son), Kim Tae-ra (daughter)
- Seo Ho (father), Sa Gang (mother), So Heun (daughter), Chae Heun [Mem Mem] (daughter)

== Special appearances families ==
- Kim Geon-woo (father), Park Sharon (mother), Kim Su-ha (daughter, 3 years old), Kim Yun-seok (son, one year old)
- Huh Gak (father), Lee Su-yeon (mother), Huh-geon (eldest son, 2 years), Huh-gang (second son, one year old)

== Ratings ==
=== 2015 ===
List of ratings in 2015 (episode 53-94)

Episode #	Original airdate	AGB ratings
53	February 28	8.0%
54	March 7	7.9%
55	March 14	6.7%
56	March 21	5.8%
57	March 28	6.9%
58	April 4	6.4%
59	April 11	4.7%
60	April 18	5.3%
61	April 25	5.1%
62	May 2	5.0%
63	May 9	5.3%
64	May 16	4.8%
65	May 23	5.6%
66	May 30	5.2%
67	June 6	6.1%
68	June 13	7.3%
	June 20	---
69	June 27	6.3%
70	July 4	7.2%
71	July 11	7.6%
72	July 18	7.7%
73	July 25	8.8%
74	August 1	7.0%
75	August 8	7.6%
76	August 15	6.6%
77	August 22	5.8%
78	August 29	7.1%
79	September 5	7.5%
80	September 12	5.7%
81	September 19	7.4%
82	September 26	6.4%
83	October 3	5.6%
84	October 10	5.2%
85	October 17	6.0%
	October 24	---
86	October 31	5.8%
87	November 7	7.1%
88	November 14	6.0%
89	November 21	4.6%
80	November 28	5.6%
91	December 5	4.3%
92	December 12	5.4%
93	December 19	5.2%
94	December 26	5.8%

=== 2016 ===
List of ratings in 2016 (episode 95-present)

Episode #	Original airdate	AGB ratings
95	January 2	7.0%
96	January 9	6.5%
97	January 16	5.9%
98	January 23	7.2%
99	January 30	6.4%
100	February 6	6.5%
101	February 13	6.8%
102	February 20	6.4%
103	February 27	5.5%
104	March 5	5.1%
105	March 12	4.5%
106	March 19	5.6%
107	March 26	6.5%
108	April 2	4.6%
	April 9	---
109	April 16	5.4%
110	April 23	4.9%
111	April 30	4.3%
112	May 7	4.1%
113	May 14	4.8%
114	May 21	3.5%
115	May 28	4.3%
116	June 4	4.9%
117	June 11	5.2%
118	June 18	5.3%
119	June 25	4.1%
120	July 2	4.3%
121	July 9	5.5%
