= Son Jun-ho (actor) =

South Korean actor (born 1983)

- Born: March 28, 1983 (age 43); Seoul, South Korea
- Occupation: Actor
- Agent: SidusHQ
- Spouse: Kim So-hyun (m. 2011)
- Children: 1

Korean name
- Hangul: 손준호
- Hanja: 孫俊浩
- RR: Son Junho
- MR: Son Chunho

Son Jun-ho (born March 28, 1983) is a South Korean singer and actor, best known in musical theatre. A classically-trained baritone, he made his debut in the 2009–2010 production of The Phantom of the Opera.

== Career ==
Having majored in voice at Yonsei University, Son opted against a career in classical music and opera. At that time it was relatively unheard of for voice majors to immediately switch to musical theater and Son later stated that he had shocked his professors upon telling them that he had auditioned for a musical, although they did give him their full support. In 2009 he was double-cast in his first musical and was initially understudy to Hong Kwang-ho, playing Raoul in The Phantom of the Opera.

Son gained wider recognition when he was cast as Aramis in the critically-acclaimed 2013 production of The Three Musketeers. The production received positive reviews and attracted foreign fans, leading to producers bringing it to Japan. For several years, Son limited his participation in musicals to devote more time to his young son and mostly performed in concerts or on Open Concert and Immortal Songs: Singing the Legend with his wife. In 2019 he garnered critical acclaim for his portrayal of Merlin in the South Korean premiere of Xcalibur and would return in the same role for its second run two years later.

== Personal life ==
Son married musical actress Kim So-hyun in 2011 and they have a son (born in 2012). They first met in The Phantom of the Opera as she was cast as Christine Daaé. As working musical actors, they largely avoid starring as a married couple in the same production but made a rare exception for The Last Empress and Elisabeth.

Son returned to Yonsei to study for his master's degree. He graduated in 2022.

== Filmography ==
=== Television series ===
Year	Title	Role	Notes	Ref.
2022	Behind Every Star	himself	Cameo (episode 7)	

=== Television show ===
Year	Title	Notes/Ref.
2013	Immortal Songs: Singing the Legend	
2014	Oh! My Baby	Cast Member
2016	Immortal Songs	
2017	King of Mask Singer	Contestant as "A God of Thunderstorm, Thor" (episodes 97–98)
2021	Crazy Love.X	Host
2022	Falling for the Performance 2	Host

=== Web shows ===
Year	Title	Role	Ref.
2021	Ssangssang Invitational	Cast Member	

=== Radio shows ===
Year	Title	Role	Note	Ref.
2021	Beautiful Morning This is Kim Chang-wan	Special DJ	August 10 – August 11	

== Musical theatre ==
Year	Title	Role
2009–2010	The Phantom of the Opera	Raoul, Vicomte de Chagny
2013–2014	The Three Musketeers	Aramis
2014	Bonnie & Clyde	Ted Hinton
2015–2016	Gone with the Wind	Ashley Wilkes
2016–2017	Phantom	Count Philippe de Chandon
2018	The Last Empress	Emperor Gojong
2018	The Three Musketeers	Aramis
2018–2019	Elisabeth	Kaiser Franz Joseph
2019	Xcalibur	Merlin
2019	Marie Antoinette	Axel von Fersen
2019–2020	Big Fish	Edward Bloom
2020	Dracula	Abraham Van Helsing
2020	Mozart!	Hieronymus von Colloredo
2021	The Last Empress	Emperor Gojong
2021	Dracula	Abraham Van Helsing
2021–2022	Xcalibur	Merlin
2025	The Last Empress	Emperor Gojong
