= Artus-Excalibur =

Artus – Excalibur
- Music: Frank Wildhorn
- Lyrics: Robin Lerner
- Book: Ivan Menchell
- Basis: Legends of King Arthur
- Productions: 2014 Theater St. Gallen; 2016 Staatz; 2016 Tecklenburg; 2019 Seoul; 2021 Seoul; 2023 Tokyo; 2026 Osnabrück

Artus - Excalibur is a musical loosely based on the legends of the 5th/6th-century British monarch King Arthur and his fabled sword, Excalibur. The score is by Frank Wildhorn, with lyrics by Robin Lerner, book by Ivan Menchell, and arrangements and orchestrations by Koen Schoots. The musical had its world premiere at the Theater St. Gallen in St. Gallen, Switzerland on March 15, 2014.

== Productions ==
The musical premiered on March 15, 2014, at the Theater St. Gallen in St. Gallen, Switzerland, starring Patrick Stanke as Arthur, Annemieke van Dam as Guinevere, Mark Seibert as Lancelot, Thomas Borchert as Merlin, and Sabrina Weckerlin as Morgana. The technical team included Francesca Zambelloon as Director, Peter Davison on sets, Mark McCullough on Lighting, Susan Willmington on costume design, and Katy Tucker on projections. The choreography is by Eric Sean Fogel and the fight scenes are by Rick Sordelet. The German translation was by Nina Schneider. A concept album of this production was released one month later on April 3, and entered the No. 1 slot on Amazon and iTunes in Germany.

South Korea debuted a production of the musical in 2019 under the title Xcalibur. In 2023, Japanese all-female theater Takarazuka Revue's Cosmos Troupe staged the musical at Brillia Hall in Ikebukuro, Tokyo. It was based on the heavily rewritten Korean version. A DVD recording of the production has been released. In 2026, the first English workshop was presented at Tuacahn Center for the Arts in Ivins, Utah.

== Plot ==
=== Act I ===
Medieval Britain is torn apart by war. King Uther Pendragon begins to madly lust after the beautiful Igraine, despite the fact that she is married. Uther calls upon the otherworldly wizard, Merlin to assist him. Merlin agrees, but demands any child conceived by Uther as payment; Uther swears. Merlin magically gives Uther the appearance of Igraine's husband, allowing Uther to trick Igraine into sleeping with him. Igraine becomes pregnant and later dies in childbirth. Merlin collects the infant from Uther and names him Arthur. A bitter Uther then rapes Morgana, his daughter from his first wife, before banishing her to a nunnery.

Years pass and Uther wages a bloody war with King Loth of Orkney for control of the country. Uther is killed in battle. After the devastating battle, the surviving knights mourn their fallen comrades ("Das Feld der Ehre / The Field of Honor"). Merlin appears and produces the magic sword, Excalibur. The wizard rams the sword into a massive stone, proclaiming that who ever pulls Excalibur from the stone will be crowned the true King of England. ("Der Heiler / The Healer").

Some time later, countless people, including a grown Arthur and his adoptive father, Sir Ector, gather around the stone to see if someone can pull free Excalibur ("Excalibur"). Arthur does not believe in the prophecy, although Ector and Arthur's best friend, Lancelot, do. When Sir Gareth, the son of Loth, fails to pull the sword from the stone he angrily sparks a battle with the other knights. Arthur, wishing to assist, climbs the stone and, to everyone's shock, frees Excalibur from the stone. The battle stops and the people fall to their knees and praise Arthur as the true king of England. Arthur, frightened, insists that he is a simple squire and not a king. Merlin suddenly appears and reveals Arthur's true heritage. When Ector confirms that he is not Arthur's real father, a shocked Arthur runs away into a nearby forest.

Merlin follows Arthur and explains that Arthur's fate has been predetermined ("Fern von dieser Welt / In This World"), but Arthur is not convinced and, throwing Excalibur into the woods, refuses to accept his destiny as king ("Schwert und Stein / Sword and Stone").

Meanwhile, a now grown and beautiful Morgana practices black magic at the nunnery, conjuring a vision of Arthur. Outraged that Arthur has been named ruler over her, despite the fact that Arthur is illegitimate, Morgana swears revenge on her half-brother ("Sünden der Väter / Sins of the Fathers").

The next morning, Arthur awakens to find Excalibur next to him. As he is about to throw the sword away again, he suddenly hears a voice. Following the voice, Arthur comes upon a young woman knelt in prayer. The woman instantly recognizes Arthur and addresses him as King. Arthur denies being king, causing the woman to explain to him the true meaning of heroism ("Ein wahrer Held / A True Hero"). Arthur finally accepts his responsibilities as king and thanks the woman, who introduces herself as Guinevere. After Guinevere leaves Arthur ponders what qualities truly make a king ("Was macht einen König aus / What Makes A King?").

Suddenly, Arthur is attacked by Sir Gareth and his rogue knights. Lancelot arrives to assist Arthur. Using the power of Excalibur, Arthur easily defeats Gareth but refuses to kill him. Merlin appears again and tells Arthur to rule from Camelot Castle. The wizard leads Arthur and his followers to Camelot, only to reveal the castle as a ruin. Arthur is discouraged at first, but Merlin encourages him to rebuild the castle. Ector, Lancelot, and the common people all rally to Arthur's side and help rebuild Camelot. Arthur then forms the Knights of the Round Table, of which Lancelot is named the first ("Die ruhmreiche Schlacht / The Glorious Battle").

Camelot flourishes, and Morgana soon arrives at the castle. Upon learning that Morgana is his half-sister Arthur happily welcomes her, but Merlin realizes she has dark magical powers and sees her as a threat. Morgana, overcome with hatred, rebuffs Arthur's welcome and demands the throne that she has been denied ("Was will ich hier / What I Want"). Arthur refuses and Morgana disappears in rage.

Arthur realizes he has fallen in love with Guinevere and writes her a letter, summoning her to Camelot. Guinevere sees Arthur as a symbol of hope for England and, upon reading the letter, falls in love with him ("Ein neuer Tag / A New Day"). Sir Lucan, one of Arthur's knights, is sent to escort Guinevere to Camelot.

Meanwhile, Morgana reaches Loth's castle and forms an alliance with him to overthrow Arthur. Loth is suspicious at first, but becomes convinced once Morgana reveals her powers. The two marry, thus combining the forces of Pendragon and Orkney. Morgana sends a group of knights to ambush Guinevere and Lucan, but the pair are rescued by Lancelot. Lucan however becomes wounded and dies. Lancelot agrees to take Lucan's place as Guinevere's guide to Camelot, and the two instantly note an attraction between them.

Merlin appears before Morgana at Castle Orkney, commanding her to abandon her quest for revenge. Morgana refuses, placing the blame for her terrible childhood on Arthur. Merlin explains that no one can demand the right to rule before returning to Camelot ("Fern von dieser Welt Reprise / In This World: Reprise").

Later, Guinevere finally arrives at Camelot while Arthur, surrounded by the Knights of the Round Table and Merlin, is officially crowned King of England. Arthur vows to defend his kingdom from all tyranny while the common people celebrate ("Heute Nacht fängt es an / It Begins Tonight").

=== Act II ===
Soon after Arthur's coronation, he and Guinevere are married, to the joy of the entire country ("Hochzeitsgelöbnis / Wedding Vows"). Lancelot watches sadly from afar, depressed that he can never have Guinevere ("Sogar der Regen schweigt still heut Nacht / Even the Rain is Silent Tonight"). Suddenly, an assassin sent by Morgana and Loth appears and lunges at Arthur. Ector saves Arthur but is mortally wounded in the process. Arthur desperately tries to save his adoptive father, but Ector succumbs to his wounds and dies in Arthur's arms ("Vater und Sohn / Father and Son").

Filled with rage, Arthur swears revenge on Loth and declares war on Castle Orkney. Guinevere tries to be nurturing, but Arthur brushes her aside. Merlin warns Arthur that Excalibur was forged to unite, not destroy, but the young king ignores the wizard's warning. Meanwhile, Morgana and Loth assemble their armies, assured of their victory ("Morgen triffst du den Tod / Tomorrow, You Meet Death").

Following an argument, Loth locks Morgana in her room. Left alone, Morgana reflects on her unhappy childhood and lonely existence ("Der Rose / The Rose").

Due to the preparations for war, Arthur grows more and more distant from Guinevere. She and Lancelot try to calm Arthur, but he blindly rejects their advice. Guinevere is left to mourn to loss of the love between her and Arthur ("Wo ging die Liebe hin / How Do You Make Love Stay?") Lancelot comforts Guinevere and the two become closer.

Meanwhile, Merlin once again visits Morgana. Morgana offers Merlin a deal, she will withdraw Loth's troops if he shares his complete knowledge of magic with her. Merlin refuses, causing Morgana to slowly seduce him ("Begehren / Desire").

Lancelot, overcome with love for Guinevere, flees into a forest ("Nur sie allein / Her Alone"). Guinevere finds Lancelot and, overcome with sadness and affection, falls into his arms. Merlin watches from afar and expresses concern for Arthur ("Der Kreis der Menschheit / The Circle of Humanity").

That night, Morgana sneaks into Arthur's bedchamber and shows Arthur a vision of Lancelot and Guinevere making love in the forest. In despair, Arthur banishes the two lovers from Camelot, while Morgana observes triumphantly ("Alles ist vorbei / The End").

Filled with temptation, Merlin finally succumbs to Morgana and, in his moment of weakness, is robbed of his magic powers; as a wizard must never indulge in mortal desires lest he lose his powers. This increases Morgana's own powers indefinitely.

A frail and mortal Merlin visits Arthur one last time. Arthur feels abandoned, but Merlin reassures Arthur that while he can no longer help him he knows Arthur can triumph over tyranny. Merlin vanishes forever and Arthur gathers his army, and courage, in preparation for the final battle ("Was macht einen König aus Reprise / What Makes A King?: Reprise").

The battle between the armies of Loth and Arthur ensues. Loth and Gareth both die in the fight, leaving Arthur victorious but Camelot a ruin once more. Arthur is suddenly brought before a wounded Lancelot, revealing the young knight had sneaked into the battle to aid Arthur. Lancelot ensures Arthur that Guinevere never truly betrayed him, as only by despair had she sought refuge with him. Lancelot then dies in Arthur's arms. Arthur mourns the loss of his friend and buries him with full honors ("Das Feld der Ehre Reprise / The Field of Honor: Reprise").

As Arthur kneels at Lancelot's grave, he suddenly hears a woman's voice behind him. Thinking it is the voice of Guinevere, Arthur drops his guard. The voice is revealed to be Morgana using her new powers to assume Guinevere's form. Morgana steals Excalibur from Arthur and prepares to kill him. Suddenly, a crossbow is fired at Morgana's back, allowing Arthur to snatch Excalibur back and impale Morgana on it, killing her.

Guinevere reveals herself as Morgana's shooter, explaining that Merlin had found her and told her Arthur needed her help. The two accept that they still love each other, and Arthur forgives Guinevere. Accompanied by the spirits of their fallen friends, Arthur and Guinevere leave together, with the hope that Camelot will one day rise again ("Vor langer Zeit / Long Ago").

== Songs ==
Act I

- Das Feld der Ehre / The Field of Honor – Ensemble
- Der Heiler / The Healer – Merlin
- Excalibur – Arthur, Lancelot, Ector, Ensemble
- Fern von dieser Welt / In This World – Merlin
- Schwert und Stein / Sword and Stone – Arthur
- Sünden der Väter / Sins of the Fathers – Morgana
- Ein wahrer Held / A True Hero – Arthur, Guinevere
- Was macht einen König aus / What Makes A King? – Arthur
- Die ruhmreiche Schlacht / The Glorious Battle – Arthur, Lancelot, Merlin, Ensemble
- Was will ich hier / What I Want – Arthur, Merlin, Morgana
- Ein neuer Tag / A New Day – Guinevere
- Fern von dieser Welt Reprise / In This World: Reprise – Merlin, Morgana
- Heute Nacht fängt es an / It Begins Tonight – Arthur, Merlin, Lancelot, Ensemble

Act II

- Hochzeitsgelöbnis / Wedding Vows – Arthur, Guinevere, Ensemble
- Sogar der Regen schweigt still heut Nacht / Even the Rain is Silent Tonight – Lancelot
- Vater und Sohn / Father and Son – Arthur, Ector
- Morgen triffst du den Tod / Tomorrow, You Meet Death – Arthur, Morgana, Loth, Guinevere, Ensemble
- Die Rose / The Rose – Morgana
- Wo ging die Liebe hin / How Do You Make Love Stay? – Guinevere
- Begehren / Desire – Merlin, Morgana
- Nur sie allein / Her Alone – Lancelot
- Der Kreis der Menschheit / The Circle of Humanity – Merlin
- Alles ist vorbei / The End – Arthur, Guinevere, Lancelot, Morgana
- Was macht einen König aus Reprise / What Makes A King?: Reprise – Arthur
- Das Feld der Ehre Reprise / The Field of Honor: Reprise – Arthur, Ensemble
- Vor langer Zeit / Long Ago – Arthur, Guinevere, Ensemble

== Casts ==
Role	St. Gallen Premiere (2014)	Staatz (2016)	Tecklenburg (2016)	Seoul (2019)	Seoul (2021)	Tokyo (2023)	Tuacahn Workshop (2026)
Arthur	Patrick Stanke	Christoph Apfelbeck	Armin Kahl	Dokyeom, Kim Junsu, Jung Ki yeol	Kim Junsu, Jung Ki-yeol, Seo Eun-kwang, Dokyeom	Toa Serika	David Toole
Guinevere	Annemieke van Dam/Lisa Antoni	Tanja Petrasek	Milica Jovanovic	Kim So-hyang, Min Kyung-ah		Sakura Haruno	Rachel Schoenecker
Lancelot	Mark Seibert/Anton Zetterholm	Philipp Dietrich	Dominik Hees	Um Ki-joon, Lee Ji-hoon, Kang-hyun Park		Minato Sakuragi	JT Wood
Merlin	Thomas Borchert	Werner Auer	Kevin Tarte	Kim Joon-hyun, Son Jun-ho		Ritsu Wakato	Randal Keith
Morgana	Sabrina Weckerlin	Regina Mallinger	Roberta Valentini	Shin Young sook, Jang Eun ah		Yuuki Mashiro	Kelsey Lee Smith
Ector	Alexander Bellinkx	Ludwig Flessl	Thomas Schirano	Park Chulho, Jo Wonhee		Akira Matsukaze	Zach Berger
Loth	Robert Johansson	Lawrence Karla	Christian Schöne				
Sir Gareth	Kevin Foster	Michael Postmann	Thomas Hohler				Sittichai Chaiyahat
Lucan	Gero Wendorff	Daniel Hauser	Andrea Luca Cotti			Eito Namiki	
Igraine	Jeannine Michele Wacker/Stéphanie Signer	Anna Burger	Sophie Blümel				
Uther	Rupert Markthaler/Richard Leggett	Wolfgang Fahrner	Zoltan Fekete			Renya Setsuki	Thom Henke

== Critical response ==
The musical received positive to mixed reviews from critics, with many praising the score and choreography, particularly the battle scenes, while criticizing the plot for being predictable and lacking in character development. Patrick Stanke was praised for his performance as Arthur.
