= Kim So-hyun (actress, born 1975) =

South Korean singer and actress (born 1975)

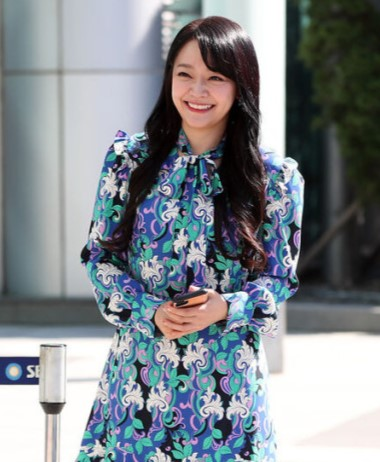
- Kim in September 2022
- Born: November 12, 1975 (age 50); Seoul, South Korea
- Other name: Sofia Kim
- Education: Seoul National University (BMus, MMus)
- Occupations: Actress; singer
- Years active: 2001–present
- Agent: Palm Tree Island
- Spouse: Son Jun-ho (m. 2011)
- Children: 1

Korean name
- Hangul: 김소현
- Hanja: 金素賢
- RR: Gim Sohyeon
- MR: Kim Sohyŏn

Kim So-hyun (Korean: 김소현; born November 12, 1975) is a South Korean musical theatre actress. A classically-trained former opera singer, she switched to musical theater and debuted in 2001 as Christine Daaé in The Phantom of the Opera. She immediately rose to musical theatre stardom and has since starred in South Korean stage productions of Jekyll & Hyde, My Fair Lady, The Three Musketeers, Elisabeth, and Marie Antoinette.

== Early life and education ==
Kim is the oldest of three children. The children grew up in a musical household as their mother, mezzo-soprano Jang Kyung-ae, was a former opera singer who gave up a promising career to raise her children.

In contrast to many of her peers, Kim did not attend a performing arts high school and has stated in a 2013 interview that she had started out playing the violin and actually shunned singing. She injured her wrist in middle school and decided to try singing after listening to a recording of La bohème.

In 1994, Kim was admitted to Seoul National University's College of Music, majoring in voice. She graduated with her bachelor's degree in 1998. In 2012, shortly after the birth of her son, she completed her master's degree.

== Career ==
=== Opera beginnings ===
Initially Kim intended to pursue a career in opera, following in her mother's footsteps. She participated in various vocal competitions, placing in the top three or reaching the semi-finals in all of them. Prior to switching to musical theater, she made her Seoul Arts Center debut, starring in La bohème (as Mimi) and The Magic Flute (as Pamina).

=== Musical theater and television ===
In 2001, then a graduate student, Kim was given the opportunity to try musical theater despite having no experience outside of opera and classical music. She successfully auditioned for the role of Christine Daaé in the Korean-language production of The Phantom of the Opera. Musical theater had only been recently introduced into South Korea, spurred by the advent of Korean-language versions of popular musicals, with The Phantom of the Opera being one of the most famous and well-attended productions. Up until then, Kim had rarely sung in Korean as she had mostly been performing opera repertoire from the Western classical tradition. She has come to be associated with the role, having portrayed Christine Daaé in the 2009 run of The Phantom of the Opera and two productions of Phantom.

When Kim first entered musical theater, classically-trained singers were uncommon as singers with her training often preferred to pursue careers as opera singers in Europe while most musical actors were primarily trained in acting rather than singing. Her powerful bel canto voice subsequently led to her being cast as female protagonists, particularly royalty; she has portrayed Empress Elisabeth of Austria in Elisabeth, Empress Myeongseong in The Last Empress and Marie Antoinette in Marie Antoinette to critical acclaim. In 2008, she won her first acting award, being named Best Actress at the Korean Musical Awards that year for her role as Eliza in My Fair Lady.

Kim gained wider public recognition through her appearances on variety shows and televised music programs. Together with her husband, the couple have performed together multiple times on Open Concert and Immortal Songs: Singing the Legend.

== Personal life ==
Kim married musical actor Son Jun-ho in 2011 and they have a son (born in 2012). They first met in the 2009 production of The Phantom of the Opera as he was cast as Raoul. As working musical actors, they largely avoid starring as a married couple in the same production but made a rare exception for The Last Empress and Elisabeth.

== Credits ==
=== Opera ===
Year	Title	Role
1996	La bohème	Mimì
2000–2001	The Magic Flute	Pamina/The Queen of the Night

=== Musical theater ===
Year	Title	Role
2001–2002	The Phantom of the Opera	Christine Daaé
2002	West Side Story	Maria
2003	Grease	Sandy
2003–2004	The Sorrows of Young Werther	Lotte
2004	Go-Go Beach	Mindy Chinchilla
2004	Jekyll & Hyde	Emma Carew
2005	Guys and Dolls	Sarah Brown
2005–2006	Pippin	Catherine
2006	Brooklyn	Brooklyn
2006	Jesus Jesus	Mary Magdalene
2006	Grease	Sandy
2007	Love in the Rain	Yoo Mi-ri
2007	A Day	Min Yeon-doo
2007	Dae Jang Geum	Seo Jang-geum
2007	Mad Kiss	Shin-hee
2008	Separated Man and Woman	Yoon Ji-ah
2008	My Fair Lady	Eliza Doolittle
2008–2009	Jekyll & Hyde	Emma Carew
2009	The Three Musketeers	Constance Bonacieux
2009	Romeo and Juliette	Juliet
2009–2011	The Phantom of the Opera	Christine Daaé
2010–2011	Jekyll & Hyde	Emma Carew
2011 2013	The Three Musketeers	Constance Bonacieux
2013	Elisabeth	Elisabeth
2014	Le Roi Soleil	Françoise d'Aubigné
2014	Wicked	Glinda
2014–2015	Marie Antoinette	Marie Antoinette
2015–2016	The Last Empress	Empress Myeongseong
2015–2016	Gone with the Wind	Scarlett O'Hara
2016	Mozart	Baronin von Waldstätten
2016–2017	Phantom	Christine Daaé
2018	The Last Empress	Empress Myeongseong
2018–2019	Elisabeth	Elisabeth
2019	Anna Karenina	Countess Anna Arkadyevna Karenina
2019	Marie Antoinette	Marie Antoinette
2020	Mozart	Baronin von Waldstätten
2021	The Last Empress	Empress Myeongseong
2021	Phantom	Christine Daaé
2021	Marie Antoinette	Marie Antoinette
2025	The Last Empress	Empress Myeongseong

== Filmography ==
=== Television series ===
Year	Title	Role	Notes	Ref.
2007–2008	The King and I	Lady Jung		
2022	Twenty-Five Twenty-One	Na Hee-do (adult)	Cameo	
2022	Behind Every Star	herself	Cameo (episode 7)	

=== Television shows ===
Year	Title	Network	Notes
2003–present	Open Concert	KBS1	
2012	Star Audition: The Great Birth - Season 3	MBC	Judge
2013	Women, Take a Trip	MBC QueeN	
2013–present	Immortal Songs: Singing the Legend	KBS2	
2014–2016	Oh! My Baby	SBS	Cast member

=== Web shows ===
Year	Title	Platform	Role	Ref.
2021	Ssangssang Invitational	Naver TV, YouTube	Cast Member	

== Awards ==
=== Vocal competitions ===
- 1995: Schubert Competition – consolation prize (semi-finalist)
- 1996: JoongAng Music Concours – 3rd place
- 1997 Korea Youth Vocal Competition (college division) – 1st place

=== Musical theater ===
Year	Award	Category	Nominated work	Result
2006	12th Korea Musical Awards	Popular Star Award		Won
2008	14th Korea Musical Awards	Best Actress	My Fair Lady	Won
2008	25th Korea Best Dresser Swan Awards	Culture Award	—N/a	Won
2009	3rd Daegu International Musical Festival	Star of the Year		Won
2011	5th Daegu International Musical Festival	Star of the Year		Won
2013	19th Korea Musical Awards	Popular Star Award		Won
2015	9th Daegu International Musical Festival	Star of the Year		Won
2016	5th Yegreen Musical Award	Best Actress	The Last Empress	Won
2018	12th Daegu International Musical Festival	Star of the Year		Won
2019	2018 Asia Culture Awards	Best Actress	Elisabeth	Won
