= Rumiko Tani =

Korean-Japanese TV personality and singer

- 谷ルミコ
- Born: Rumiko Tani (谷留美子); August 12, 1979 (age 47); Tokyo, Japan
- Other names: Chinatsu Miyoshi (三佳 千夏, Miyoshi Chinatsu)
- Occupation: Television personality
- Spouse: Kim Jung-min (m. 2006)
- Children: 3
- Musical career
- Genre: J-pop
- Years active: 1999–2000, 2005–present

Rumiko Tani (谷ルミコ, Tani Rumiko; born August 12, 1979, in Tokyo, Japan), formerly known professionally as Chinatsu Miyoshi (三佳千夏), is a Korean-Japanese television personality and a former idol singer associated with Hello! Project.

== Career ==
=== 1999-2000: Early career as Chinatsu Miyoshi ===
Under the name Chinatsu Miyoshi, Tani was the grand prix winner of the Morning Musume & Michiyo Heike Sister Protegee Audition held by Hello! Project in March 1999. On August 4, 1999, she released her first single, "Unchain My Heart", as the ending theme to Kiss Dake ja Iya! Her second single, "Love, Yes I Do!" was released on November 10, 1999, as the ending theme to Sorcerous Stabber Orphen. In 2000, she also appeared in Pinch Runner, a film starring Morning Musume. Her third single, "Anata no Shirt to Love Song", was released on May 31, 2000. All of her singles failed to chart, after which she decided to leave Hello! Project in September 2000.

=== 2005-present: Return to entertainment, relocation to South Korea ===
In 2005, Tani returned to entertainment under her real name and provided vocals to the songs "W/U I Can" and "Hear My Cry", which were featured in the horror film Kokkuri-san. After her marriage in 2006, she relocated to South Korea. She was a cast member in the variety show Oh! My Baby.

== Personal life ==
Tani is a third-generation Korean-Japanese. On October 21, 2006, Tani married South Korean singer and actor Kim Jung-min. They have three sons, and one of them, Da-myool, was featured with them on the reality show Oh! My Baby.

== Discography ==
=== Singles ===
Title	Year	Peak chart positions	Sales	Album
Title	Year	JPN	Sales	Album
"Unchain My Heart"	1999	—	—	Non-album single
"Love, Yes I Do!"	1999	—	—	Non-album single
"Anata to Shirt to Love Song" (あなたのシャツとLove song)	2000	—	—	Non-album single
"—" denotes releases that did not chart or were not released in that region.

=== Soundtrack appearances ===
Title	Year	Peak chart positions	Sales	Album
Title	Year	JPN	Sales	Album
"W/U I Can"	2005	—	—	Kokkuri-san Original Soundtrack
"Hear My Cry"	2005	—	—	Kokkuri-san Original Soundtrack
"—" denotes releases that did not chart or were not released in that region.
