= The Last Empress (musical) =

1995 South Korean historical musical

- Music: Kim Hee-gap
- Lyrics: Yang In-ja; Georgina St. George
- Book: Kwang Lim-kim
- Basis: The Fox Hunt by Yi Mun-yol
- Premiere: December 30, 1995
- Productions: 1995 Seoul; 1997 Lincoln Center; 2002 West End; 2003 Los Angeles; 2004 Toronto

The Last Empress (Korean: 뮤지컬 명성황후) is a Korean musical about the Empress Myeongseong of Korea, based on the play The Fox Hunt by author Yi Mun-yol. It debuted on December 30, 1995 at the Seoul Arts Center.

The musical was created by musical director Yoon Ho-jin, who came up with the idea after watching a production of Cats in London. Yoon urged author Yi Mun-yol to write a play about Empress Myeongseong, leading him to write The Fox Hunt in 1994. The play was adapted into a musical by playwright Kwang Lim-kim.

The musical's songs were composed by Kim Hee-gap, with lyrics by Yang In-ja (translated by Georgina St. George). The musical was produced by the Seoul-based company Arts Communication (A-Com).

The original production at the Seoul Performing Arts Center reached one million ticket sales by March 1, 2007. The musical was performed several times in South Korea, including a production in 2021. In 2025, to celebrate the musical's 30th anniversary, The Last Empress reopened at the Sejong Center in South Korea, playing from January to March.

The musical also played overseas at the New York State Theater, Lincoln Center, in 1997 and 1998, to favorable reviews. It also played in London's West End in 2002, the Kodak Theatre in Los Angeles in 2003, and at Toronto's Hummingbird Centre in 2004. The Last Empress was the first Korean musical to be played at Western venues.

== Principal casts ==
Character	Original	2021	2025
Empress Myeongseong	Yi Tae-won	Kim So-hyun, Shin Young-sook	Kim So-hyun, Shin Young-sook, Cha Ji-yeon
Gojong	Kim Sun-tak	Kang Pil-seok, Son Jun-ho	Kang Pil-seok, Son Jun-ho, Julian Jootaek Kim
Hong Gye-hun	Oh Jong-hyuk	Park Min-seong, Yoon Hyeong-ryeol, Lee Chang-sub	Yang Jun-mo, Park Min-seong, Hyunghun Baek
Daewongun	Seo Young-joo	Lee Jeong-yeol, Seo Beom-seok	Lee Jeong-yeol, Seo Young-joo
Miura	Kim Do-hyung (actor)	Kim Do-hyung, Choi Min-cheol	Kim Do-hyung, Moon Jong-won

== See also ==
- Empress Myeongseong (TV series)
