= Jin-sung =

- Hangul: 진성
- RR: Jinseong
- MR: Chinsŏng

Jin-sung, also spelled Jin-seong, is a Korean given name.

People with this name include:

- Lee Jin-sung (born 1956), South Korean judge
- Jang Jin-sung (born 1971), pseudonym of North Korean poet defector
- Choi Jin-sung (director) (born 1975), South Korean film director and screenwriter
- Hwang Jin-sung (born 1984), South Korean football player
- Kim Jin-sung (baseball) (born 1985), South Korean baseball player
- Monday Kiz (singer) (born Kim Jin-sung, 1985), South Korean singer
- Yang Jin-sung (born 1988), South Korean actress

== See also ==
- List of Korean given names
