= KCM (singer) =

South Korean singer

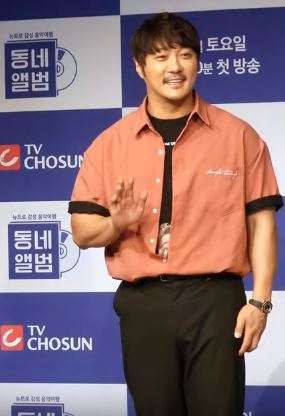
- KCM in July 2019
- Born: Kang Chang-mo
- Spouse: Bang Ye-won (m. 2021)
- Children: 3
- Musical career
- Origin: South Korea
- Genres: R&B, ballad
- Occupation: Singer
- Years active: 2003–present
- Label: Image9Coms

Korean name
- Hangul: 강창모
- RR: Gang Changmo
- MR: Kang Ch'angmo

Kang Chang-mo (Korean: 강창모), better known by his stage name KCM (Korean: 케이씨엠), is a South Korean singer. He debuted in 2003 with the song "I Know", from the soundtrack to the Korean drama, Punch (때려).

== Personal life ==
On January 13, 2022, Kang has recently registered for marriage with his non-celebrity girlfriend who is 9 years younger than him. The wedding ceremony has been postponed due to the COVID-19 situation. On March 19, 2025, it was revealed that Kang is the father of two daughters and that he had registered his marriage in 2021. The couple welcomed a third child, a boy, on December 20, 2025.

== Discography ==
=== Studio albums ===
Title	Album details	Peak chart positions	Sales
Title	Album details	KOR	Sales
Beautiful Mind	Released: September 6, 2004; Label: Happy Entertainment; Formats: CD, cassette	10	KOR: 36,810
Growing Up	Released: June 21, 2005; Label: Happy Entertainment; Formats: CD, cassette	6	KOR: 81,446
Love Affair	Released: February 1, 2006; Label: Happy Entertainment; Formats: CD, cassette	2	KOR: 65,481
Kingdom	Released: January 17, 2008; Label: Ogan Entertainment; Formats: CD	—	—N/a
One Day (하루가)	Released: January 13, 2010; Label: Blending Co.; Formats: CD, digital download	—	—N/a
Reflection of My Mind	Released: November 26, 2016; Label: Sebunguri Entertainment; Formats: CD, digital download	9	KOR: 4,922+
"—" denotes release did not chart.

=== Extended plays ===
Title	EP details	Peak chart positions
Title	EP details	KOR
Espresso	Released: February 3, 2009; Label: Happy Entertainment; Formats: CD	—
Alone (Part 1)	Released: November 17, 2009; Label: Blending Co.; Formats: CD	—
Alone (Part 2)	Released: November 11, 2010; Label: C9 Entertainment; Formats: CD, digital download	14
Promise	Released: April 13, 2019; Label: NK Company; Formats: CD, digital download	—
"—" denotes release did not chart.

=== Singles ===
Title	Year	Peak chart positions	Album
Title	Year	KOR	Album
As lead artist
"Color Flower" feat. MC Mong	2010	20	Non-album singles
"Because of You" (그대라는 이유)	2011	91	Non-album singles
"Mom, Dad, I Love You" (엄마 아빠 사랑해요)	2011	—	Non-album singles
"Hedgehog Love" (엄마의 착각)	2016	—	Non-album singles
"Dawn" (새벽길)	2016	—	Non-album singles
"Count to Three Like a Habit" (버릇처럼 셋을 센다)	2020	95	Non-album singles
"Dear Love" (사랑아)	2022	109	Non-album singles
"There's Still Someone I Love" (아직 사랑하는 사람이 있어요)	2024	188	Us
Collaborations
"Two Men's Story" with The One	2011	45	Non-album singles
"The Old Tree" (오랜나무) with Navi	2011	—	Non-album singles
"I Love You" (사랑하나이다) with Navi	2016	—	Non-album singles
"Speaking Habit" (말버릇) with Zia	2017	93	Non-album singles
"Journey to Atlantis" (상상더하기) with MSG Wannabe	2021	7	MSG Wannabe Top 8 Performance Songs
"If" (만약에) with Jee Seok-jin, Wonstein, Parc Jae-jung	2021	19	MSG Wannabe Top 8 Performance Songs
"Foolish Love" (바라만 본다) with Jee Seok-jin, Wonstein, Parc Jae-jung	2021	1	MSG Wannabe 1st Album
"I Love You" (난 너를 사랑해) (with MSG Wannabe)	2021	25	MSG Wannabe 1st Album
"I Luv U" (with Kim Jong-kook and Mirani)	2022	96	Non-album singles
"Sad Snowman" (슬픈 눈사람) (with Ja Jung)	2022	177	Non-album singles
Soundtrack appearances
"Love You to Death" (죽도록 사랑해) feat. Soul Dive	2010	33	Bread, Love and Dreams OST Part 2
"Missing You"	2010	91	Big Thing OST Part 2
"Bad" (나쁜 너)	2012	—	Immortal Classic OST Part 2
"Make Me Cry" (울게 하소서)	2013	—	Basketball OST Part 3
"Closed Heart" (갇힌 맘)	2016	—	My Lawyer, Mr. Jo OST Part 4
"Only You"	2016	—	Five Enough OST Part 4
"Remember" (기억)	2016	—	W OST Part 4
"Now We Love You" (이제 우리 사랑해요)	2022	—	Healer OST
"—" denotes releases that did not chart.

== Filmography ==
=== Film ===
Year	Title	Role	Ref.
2022	Re:fresh	K	

=== Web series ===
Year	Title	Role	Notes	Ref.
2021	You Raise Me Up		Cameo	

=== Television shows ===
Year	Title	Role	Notes	Ref.
2021	Sing Together Season 2	Host	with Kim Tae-woo	
2021	Call me	Host		
2021	Good.R.Sam	Cast		
2022	Godfather	Cast Member	with Choi Hwan-hee	
2022	legendfestival	Participant		
2022	Crazy Encounter Season 4	Host	with Yerin	
2023	For the First Time in Our Lives	Cast Member		

=== Web show ===
Year	Title	Role	Ref.
2021	Ranking Gourmet	Host	
2022	Why Not Crew	Host	

=== Music video appearances ===
Year	Song Title	Artist	Ref.
2021	"Keep your head up" (네가 아는 너)	Lee Dong-hwi	

== Awards and nominations ==
Name of the award ceremony, year presented, category, nominee of the award, and the result of the nomination
Award ceremony	Year	Category	Nominee / Work	Result	Ref.
Seoul International Drama Awards	2021	Excellent Korean Drama OST	"I'm more afraid"	Nominated	
