= Shin Youngsook =

South Korean musical theatre actress (born 1975)

- 신영숙
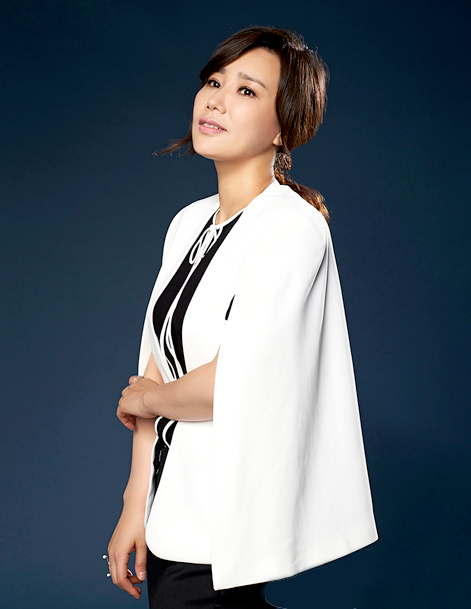
- Shin in 2015
- Born: 26 November 1975 (age 50); Seoul, South Korea
- Occupation: Musical actress
- Years active: 1999–present

Shin Youngsook (申榮淑, born November 26, 1975) is a South Korean musical theatre actress. She majored in vocal performance at the university and made her musical debut, she appeared in the musical The Last Empress as Lady Sontag. She was a member of the Seoul Performing Arts Company from 2000 to 2007. The final level of education she has completed is a master's degree in Dankook University.

== Early life ==
Shin was born in Seoul, South Korea, as the fifth youngest child. She began singing as a child, and played instruments such as piano, acoustic guitar, accordion, and harmonica. She became interested in Pansori. She won first place in a school choir competition several times. When she was in high school, she conducted the school choirs, and worked at the missionary choir. Thanks to her early musical activities, she started to learn voice performance at university.

== Career ==
After university graduation, Shin prepared to study her major abroad and auditioned for The Last Empress by chance. She was cast as Lady Sontag. She then decided to become a musical actress. After her debut, she entered Seoul Performing Arts Company in order to learn acting performance.

=== 2000–2007 (Seoul Performing Arts Company) ===
In 2002, Shin appeared as Nanny in musical Romeo and Juliet. She was nominated for the 7th Korean Musical Awards as best supporting actress. In 2004, she appeared as Kappuni in musical play The day to marry. She performed the character as an independent modern woman saying "I'll find my true love by myself." In 2005, she appeared as the title role Bari in the musical play Bari. Shin originated the role of Seryu in the musical The Kingdom of the Winds, and the role of Noksu in the musical Yi.

=== 2008–present ===
Shin appeared as the major characters of musicals such as Grizabella in Cats, Baroness Waldstatten in Mozart!, Gertrude in Hamlet, Madame Therese Defarge in A Tale of Two Cities, Mrs. Danvers in Rebecca, Empress Myeongseong in The Last Empress and Donna in Mamma Mia!. When she sang the musical number "Gold von den Sternen (Gold star)" in Mozart! astonishingly well, she gained a nickname "Ms. Gold star". She was beloved for the role of Mrs. Danvers and Baroness Valdstatten, earning Golden Ticket Awards and Korea Musical Awards as the Best Supporting Actress for these roles. In 2015, Shin came back as title role to her debut musical The Last Empress.

== Stage performances ==
- 1999 The Last Empress, Lady Sontag
- 2000 Daebak, Mrs. Heungbu
- 2000 Taepung, Ariel
- 2001 Taepung, Ariel
- 2002 The kingdom of winds
- 2002 The morning of Goryeo, Princess Hyemyeong
- 2002 Romeo and Juliet, Nanny
- 2002 Taepung, Trinculo
- 2003 Romeo and Juliet, Nanny
- 2003 Sound of Music, Reverend Mother
- 2003 Christmas Carol, Madmame Cratchit
- 2004 Midsummer night's dream, Helena
- 2004 The day to marry, kappuni
- 2004 Christmas Carol, Madame Cratchit
- 2005 Bari, Bari
- 2005 Christmas Carol, Madame Cratchit
- 2005 Scents of Ancient, Moocheon, Sanhwaga
- 2005 Romeo and Juliet, Nanny
- 2006 Romeo and Juliet, Nanny
- 2006 The Kingdom of winds, Seryu
- 2006 Yi, Noksu
- 2006 Christmas Carol, Madame Cratchit
- 2007 Sister Soul, Josephine
- 2007 Hairspray, motormouth
- 2007 The kingdom of winds, Seryu
- 2008 Cats, Grizabella
- 2008 Bad boys, Muriel
- 2009 Romeo and Juliet (French production), Lady Capulet
- 2009 Cats, Grizabella
- 2010 Spamalot, Lady of the lake
- 2010 Coronation Ball - starmania, Stella Spotlight / Cydia
- 2010 Turandot, Turandot
- 2010 Mozart!, Baroness Valdstatten
- 2011 Hamlet, Gertrude
- 2011 Mozart!, Baroness Valdstatten
- 2012 Rudolf, Countess Larisch
- 2012 A Tale of Two Cities, Madame Defarge
- 2012 Sherlock Holmes, Jane Watson
- 2013 Rebecca, Mrs. Danvers
- 2013 A Tale of Two Cities, Madame Defarge
- 2013 Guys and Dolls, Adelaide
- 2014 Mozart!, Baroness Valdstatten
- 2014 Rebecca, Mrs. Danvers.
- 2015 Phantom, Madame Carlotta
- 2015 The Last Empress, Myeongseong Empress
- 2016 Rebecca, Mrs. Danvers
- 2016 Mamma Mia!, Donna Sheridan
- 2016 Mozart!, Baroness Valdstatten
- 2016 Phantom, Madame Carlotta
- 2017 Turandot, Turandot
- 2017 Rebecca, Mrs. Danvers
- 2017 The last kiss, Marie Countess Larisch
- 2018 The Man Who Laughs, Duchess Josiana
- 2018 Elisabeth, Elisabeth
- 2019 Xcalibur, Morgana
- 2019 Mamma Mia!, Donna Sheridan
- 2019 Rebecca, Mrs. Danvers
- 2020 The Man Who Laughs, Duchess Josiana
- 2020 Mozart!, Baroness Valdstatten
- 2021, The Last Empress, Empress Myeongseong
- 2022 Mrs. Doubtfire, Miranda
- 2022 Mrs. Doubtfire, Miranda
- 2022–2023 42nd Street, Dorothy Brock
- 2025, The Last Empress, Empress Myeongseong

== Awards ==
- 2018 2nd Korea Musical Awards, Best Supporting Actress
- 2017 1st Korea Musical Awards, Best Supporting Actress
- 2017 12th Golden Ticket Awards, Best Actress
- 2016 10th DIMF Awards, Star of the Year
- 2016 11th Golden Ticket Awards, Scene Stealer
- 2015 9th DIMF Awards, Star of the Year
- 2013 7th DIMF Awards, Star of the Year
- 2012 18th Korean Musical Awards, Best Actress nomination
- 2011 17th Korean Musical Awards, Best Actress nomination
- 2010 4th The Musical Awards, Best Supporting Actress
- 2003 9th Korean Musical Awards, Best Supporting Actress nomination
- 2019 14th Golden Ticket Awards, Best Actress in a Musical
- 2020 4th Korea Musical Awards, Kakao Best Character Award (Excalibur - Morgana)
- 2023 17th Golden Ticket Awards, Musical Actress
- 2023 17th DIMF AWARDS, Star of the Year Award
