= Kim Jung-min (entertainer) =

South Korean singer and actor

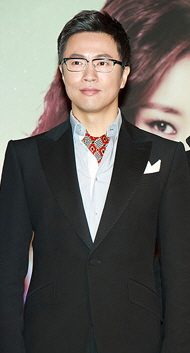
- Kim in 2012
- Born: Kim Jung-soo; August 23, 1968 (age 58); Seoul, South Korea
- Occupations: Singer; actor
- Years active: 1989–present
- Spouse: Rumiko Tani (m. 2006)
- Children: 3

Korean name
- Hangul: 김정민
- Hanja: 金正民
- RR: Gim Jeongmin
- MR: Kim Chŏngmin

Birth name
- Hangul: 김정수
- Hanja: 金正洙
- RR: Gim Jeongsu
- MR: Kim Chŏngsu

Kim Jung-min (born Kim Jung-soo on August 23, 1968) is a South Korean singer and actor.

== Personal life ==
In 2006, Kim married Japanese television personality and former idol, Rumiko Tani, who is eleven years younger than him. Together they have three sons.

== Discography ==
=== Studio albums ===
Title	Album details	Sales
Kimjungmin	Released: June 1, 1994; Label: True Music	
4Love	Released: November 1, 1995; Label: Beyond Music	
Change	Released: October 1, 1996; Label: Beyond Music	
Jump 98	Released: March 1, 1998; Label: Beyond Music	KOR: 372,079
The Greatest Love Song 2002	Released: February 27, 2002; Label: Dooson Entertainment	KOR: 269,249
2003 Reborn of Tiger	Released: January 24, 2003; Label: INI Entertainment	KOR: 63,179
Beautiful My Life	Released: September 23, 2009; Label: M Cloud Entertainment	

== Filmography ==
=== Television series ===
- Old Miss Diary (2004–2005)
- H.I.T (2007)
- Kokkiri (2008)
- Blossom Sisters (2010)
- Miss Ajumma (2011)
- 12 Signs of Love (2012)
- Potato Star 2013QR3 (2013–2014)
- What Happens to My Family? (2014–2015)
- Lady Cha Dal-rae's Lover (2018–2019)
- So Not Worth It (2021)

=== Film ===
- Old Miss Diary (2006)
- Project Makeover (2006)

=== Variety shows ===
- King of Mask Singer (MBC, 2015): Contestant as "Asleep or Awake, Safety First" (Episodes 31–32)
- King of Mask Singer (MBC, 2020): Contestant as "Squid" (Episodes 261–262)
- Kim Jung-min's Morning Shouting (Naver, 2021)
- Chosun Panstar (MBN, 2021, judge)
- Call me (MBC Every1, 2021, Host)
- Legend Festival (JTBC, 2022, Participant)

=== Music video appearances ===
Year	Song Title	Artist	Ref.
2021	"Keep Your Head Up" (네가 아는 너)	Lee Dong-hwi	
2022	"Do You Want to Hear" (듣고 싶을까)	MSG Wannabe MOM	
