= The Three Musketeers (musical) =

American musical

- Music: Rudolf Friml
- Lyrics: P.G. Wodehouse; Clifford Grey
- Book: William Anthony McGuire
- Basis: The Three Musketeers by Alexandre Dumas, père
- Productions: 1928 Broadway; 1930 West End; 1984 Broadway revival

The Three Musketeers is a musical with a book by William Anthony McGuire, lyrics by Clifford Grey and P. G. Wodehouse, and music by Rudolf Friml. It is based on the classic 1844 novel by Alexandre Dumas, père. Set in France and England in 1626, it recounts the adventures of a young man named d'Artagnan after he leaves home to become a Musketeer of the Guard. The three men of the title are his friends Athos, Porthos, and Aramis.

The original 1928 production on Broadway, and a 1930 West End run, both starring Dennis King as d'Artagnan, were successful, but a 1984 attempt at a much-revised Broadway revival flopped.

== Plot synopsis ==
In early 17th century France, the poor but virile d'Artagnan travels to Paris to join the Musketeers (the King's bodyguard). He meets and falls in love with Lady Constance Bonacieux, a lady-in-waiting to Queen Anne. Meanwhile, Cardinal Richelieu learns that the Queen has given a diamond heart brooch, which was a present to her from the King, as a token of love to the Duke of Buckingham. Richelieu suggests that the King ask the Queen to wear it at a planned royal gala. Richelieu dispatches the Comte de Rochefort and Milady de Winter to London to recover the gem, which he plans to unveil at the gala in order to reveal that the Queen has been unfaithful.

The Queen asks her lady-in-waiting, Constance Bonacieux, to involve the Musketeers in the jewel's speedy recovery so that she might foil the plot. But when the Musketeers reach London, they are too late: Lady de Winter has arrived first. D'Artagnan uses his seductive charms upon Milady de Winter and steals the bauble. After a rousing sword fight, the Musketeers kill de Rochefort and rush back to Paris just in time to bring the jewel to the gala. King Louis fastens it to the Queen's shoulder just as he did when he first gave it to her.

== Musical numbers ==
Act I

- Summer Time – Villagers
- All for One – Aramis, Athos and Porthos
- The 'He' for Me – Constance, Girls, Aramis, Athos and Porthos
- My Sword – D'Artagnan and Company
- Heart of Mine – D'Artagnan and Constance
- My Sword and I – D'Artagnan and Villagers
- Vesper Bell – The Pensionaires
- Dreams – Queen Anne
- Te Deum – D'Artagnan and Nuns
- March of the Musketeers – D'Artagnan, Athos, Porthos, Aramis and Musketeers
- Colonel and Major – Planchet and Girls
- Love is the Sun – Queen Anne, Constance and The Duke of Buckingham
- Heart of Mine (reprise) – Constance and D'Artagnan
- Welcome to the Queen – Ladies and Courtiers

Act II

- With Red Wine – Porthos and Company
- My Belle – Aramis
- Kiss Before I Go – Constance and D'Artagnan
- Pages – Albertina Rasch Dancers
- Queen of My Heart – The Duke of Buckingham
- Gossip – Planchet and Ladies
- Until We Say Goodbye – Constance Bonacieux

The 1984 revival deleted many of the original songs, added other Friml songs, and moved others to different positions in the story.

== Productions ==
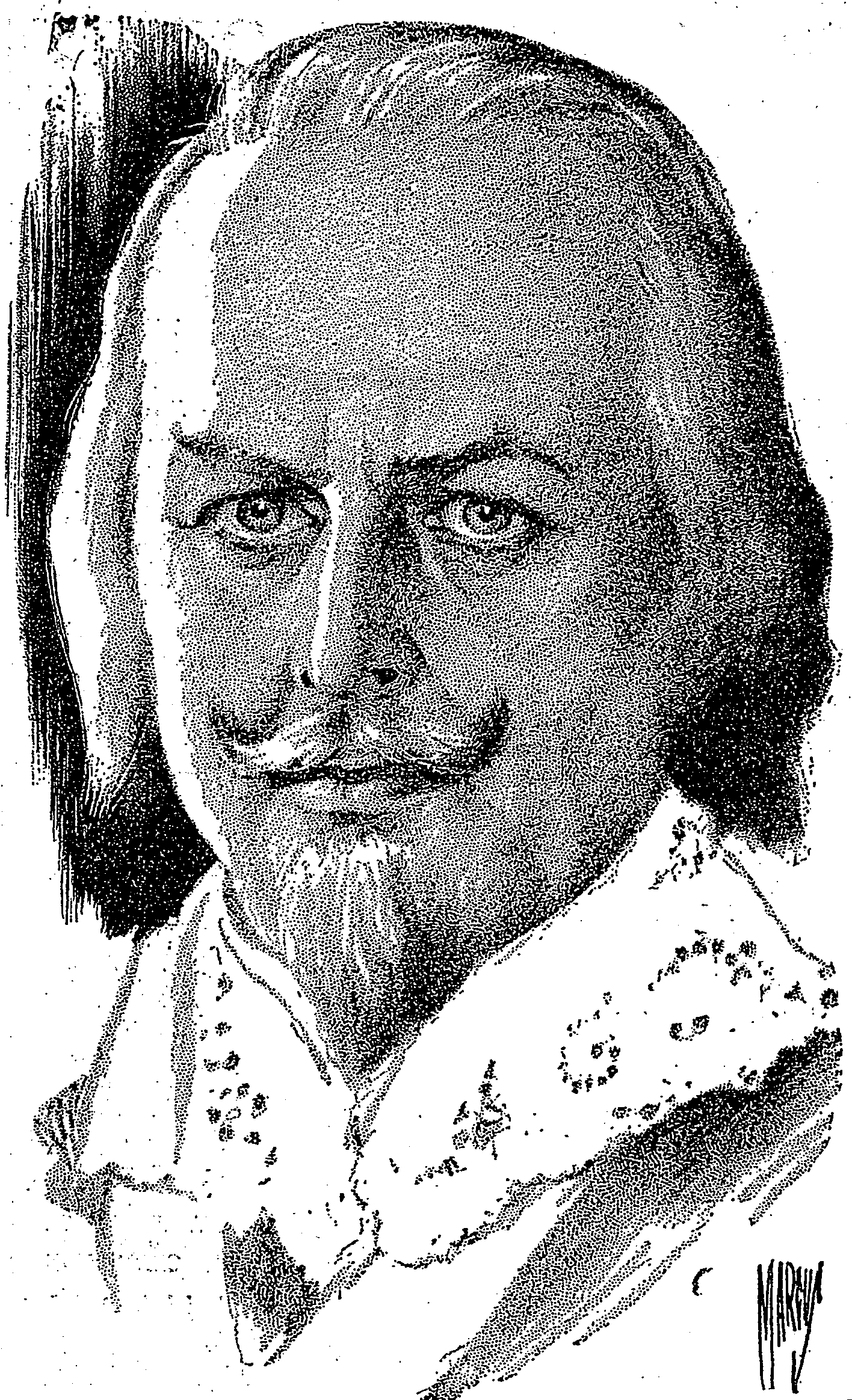
1928 drawing of Reginald Owen as Cardinal Richelieu.

Original production

The original Broadway production was produced by Florenz Ziegfeld, directed by librettist McGuire, and choreographed by Albertina Rasch. It opened on March 13, 1928 at the Lyric Theatre and ran for 318 performances. The cast included Dennis King as d'Artagnan, Douglass R. Dumbrille as Athos, Detmar Poppen as Porthos, Joseph Macaulay as Aramis, Clarence Derwent as Louis XIII, Vivienne Segal as Constance Bonacieux, and Reginald Owen as Cardinal Richelieu. Supporting roles included Naomi Johnson as Zoe, the sweetheart of Planchet.

1930 West End

King reprised his role for a 1930 West End production at the Theatre Royal, Drury Lane that ran for 242 performances. The cast also included Marie Ney as Lady De Winter, Jerry Verno as Planchet, Webster Booth as The Duke of Buckingham and Arthur Wontner as Cardinal Richelieu.

1984 Broadway

A 1984 revival with a new book by Mark Bramble was directed by Tom O'Horgan, but shortly before opening, Joe Layton replaced O'Horgan. The dance choreography was by Lester Wilson. After 15 previews, it opened on November 11 at The Broadway Theatre. It closed after just 9 performances despite a cast that included Michael Praed as d'Artagnan, Chuck Wagner as Athos, Ron Taylor as Porthos, Brent Spiner as Aramis, Roy Brocksmith as Louis XIII, Liz Callaway as Lady Constance Bonacieux, Marianne Tatum as Milady de Winter and Ed Dixon as Cardinal Richelieu. Tatum was nominated for the Drama Desk Award for Outstanding Featured Actress in a Musical. In his review in The New York Times, Frank Rich commented:

"The Three Musketeers is a good-natured attempt to jazz up Rudolf Friml's Dumas-inspired operetta ... much as the New York Shakespeare Festival retooled The Pirates of Penzance a few seasons ago. But this time the source material is many rungs below Gilbert and Sullivan – and the new accouterments add no wit, style, sexiness or show-biz dazzle. ... Mark Bramble['s]... idea of writing a musical book ... is to minimize the book. The baroque plot of The Three Musketeers is so frenetically and confusingly conveyed that no child is likely to understand who the Duke of Buckingham is, or why Cardinal Richelieu is such a pill, or why everyone is chasing after a diamond brooch throughout Act II. ... The title characters ... often seem like interchangeable stand-ins for the Three Stooges. ... Joe Layton has tried to give the show the illusion of excitement by staging it at a frantic pace and by sending the actors running up and down the aisles ... [but] everyone seems to be scurrying pointlessly about just to keep busy. After a while, the company begins to look like a road troupe of Camelot on amphetamines."

2010 and 2011 South Korea

A South Korean production ran from December 15, 2010 to mid-January 2011 starring Kyuhyun and Jay "Typhoon" Kim rotating as D'Artagnan, along with Dana Hong at Chungmu Arts Hall in Seoul. Another production ran from November 3, 2011 to late December 2011, starring Heo Young-saeng and Oh Won-bin alternating as D'Artagnan.
