= List of King of Mask Singer episodes (2022) =

South Korean variety-music show

- No. of episodes: 45

Release
- Original network: MBC
- Original release: January 2 – December 25, 2022

Season chronology
- ← Previous; 2021 Next → 2023

This is a list of episodes of the South Korean variety-music show King of Mask Singer in 2022. The show airs on MBC as part of their Sunday Night lineup. Due to the COVID-19 pandemic, the show would be recorded without any audience in the episodes, and the matches' results would be decided by the celebrity panelists. As of the 178th Generation on May 29, 2022, the live audience returned similar to before the pandemic. The names listed below are in performance order.

– Contestant is instantly eliminated by the live audience and judging panel
– After being eliminated, contestant performs a prepared song for the next round and takes off their mask during the instrumental break
– After being eliminated and revealing their identity, contestant has another special performance.
– Contestant advances to the next round.
– Contestant becomes the challenger.
– Mask King.

== Episodes ==
=== 168th Generation Mask King (cont.) ===
- Contestants: Thunder, Danny Koo, Kim Sung-kyung, Kim Jang-soo (The Treble Clef), Bae Yoon-jeong, Rhee Dae-eun, Lee Kyung-ae, Kim Hye-yeon
Episode 338

Episode 338 was broadcast on January 2, 2022.

Order	Stage Name	Real Name	Song	Original artist	Vote
Opening	The East Invincibility	Son Seung-yeon	Song of the Wind (바람의 노래)	Cho Yong-pil	—
Round 2
Pair 1	Rudolph the Red Nosed Reindeer	Thunder	Sleepless Rainy Night (잠 못 드는 밤 비는 내리고)	Kim Gun-mo	4
Pair 1	Dad	Kim Jang-soo of The Treble Clef	Is Anyone There? (누구없소)	Han Young-ae	17
Pair 2	Graduation Photo	Bae Yoon-jeong	The Reason Was a Pain for Me (그 이유가 내겐 아픔이었네)	Lee Ji-yeon	7
Pair 2	Everybody, Be Rich!	Kim Hye-yeon	Cafe of the Winter (그 겨울의 찻집)	Cho Yong-pil	14
Round 3
Finalists	Dad	Kim Jang-soo of The Treble Clef	Love Love Love (사랑 사랑 사랑)	Kim Hyun-sik	13
Finalists	Everybody, Be Rich!	Kim Hye-yeon	If You Love Again (다시 사랑한다면)	Do Won-kyung	8
Special	Everybody, Be Rich!	Kim Hye-yeon	Snake (Please Be Patient) (뱀이다(참아주세요)); Seoul Daejeon Daegu Busan (서울 대전 대구 부산)	Kim Hye-yeon	—
Final
Battle	Dad	Kim Jang-soo of The Treble Clef	Previous three songs used as voting standard		4
Battle	Winter Kid	Lee Mu-jin	Once While Living (살다가 한 번쯤)	4Men	17
Special	Uncle	Kim Jang-soo of The Treble Clef	Lying on the Sea (바다에 누워)	The Treble Clef	—

=== 169th Generation Mask King ===
- Contestants: Kang Joo-won (Pinocchio), Park Jae-jin (45RPM), Lee Jang-kun, Kim Eun-jung (Jewelry), Kota (Sunny Hill), Hickee, Lee Dae-yeol (Golden Child), Lee Do-jin
Episodes 339 – 340

Episode 339

Episode 339 was broadcast on January 9, 2022. This marks the beginning of the Hundred-sixty-ninth Generation.

Order	Stage Name	Real Name	Song	Original artist	Vote
Round 1
Pair 1	Chrysanthemum Bread	Kang Joo-won of Pinocchio	Between Hidden Time (가려진 시간 사이로)	Yoon Sang	19
Pair 1	Peanut Bread	Park Jae-jin of 45RPM	Between Hidden Time (가려진 시간 사이로)	Yoon Sang	2
2nd Song	Peanut Bread	Park Jae-jin of 45RPM	Past Days (지난날)	Yoo Jae-ha	—
Pair 2	Ice Prince	Lee Jang-kun	Love Actually (들었다 놨다)	Daybreak	5
Pair 2	Ice Princess	Kim Eun-jung of Jewelry	Love Actually (들었다 놨다)	Daybreak	16
2nd Song	Ice Prince	Lee Jang-kun	Emergency Room (응급실)	IZI	—
Pair 3	Morning Call	Kota of Sunny Hill	Singing Got Better (노래가 늘었어)	Ailee	5
Pair 3	Curtain Call	Hickee	Singing Got Better (노래가 늘었어)	Ailee	16
2nd Song	Morning Call	Kota of Sunny Hill	One Late Night in 1994 (1994년 어느 늦은 밤)	Jang Hye-jin	—
Pair 4	Lucky Two Dollars	Daeyeol of Golden Child	Tell Me in the Eyes (눈을 보고 말해요)	V.O.S	7
Pair 4	Four Dollars	Lee Do-jin	Tell Me in the Eyes (눈을 보고 말해요)	V.O.S	14
2nd Song	Lucky Two Dollars	Daeyeol of Golden Child	Thunder (천둥)	F.T. Island	—

Episode 340

Episode 340 was broadcast on January 16, 2022.

Order	Stage Name	Real Name	Song	Original artist	Vote
Round 2
Pair 1	Chrysanthemum Bread	Kang Joo-won of Pinocchio	Aria of Sad Soul (슬픈 영혼의 아리아)	Kim Kyung-ho	19
Pair 1	Ice Princess	Kim Eun-jung of Jewelry	A Love Only Heaven Permits (하늘만 허락한 사랑)	Uhm Jung-hwa	2
Pair 2	Curtain Call	Hickee	I Didn't Weep Tears (눈물이 안났어)	Lim Jeong-hee	13
Pair 2	Four Dollars	Lee Do-jin	If by Chance (만약에 말야)	Noel	8
Round 3
Finalists	Chrysanthemum Bread	Kang Joo-won of Pinocchio	Unknown World (미지의 세계)	Cho Yong-pil	6
Finalists	Curtain Call	Hickee	Snapping	Chungha	15
Special	Chrysanthemum Bread	Kang Joo-won of Pinocchio	Between Love and Friendship (사랑과 우정사이)	Pinocchio	—
Final
Battle	Curtain Call	Hickee	Previous three songs used as voting standard		9
Battle	Winter Kid	Lee Mu-jin	Love Poem	IU	12
Special	Curtain Call	Hickee	Shiny Star (밤하늘의 별을)	Hickee	—

=== 170th Generation Mask King ===
- Contestants: Lee Jae-sung, Yang Hee-seung, Eunha (Viviz), Kwon Jin-young, Jonathan Yiombi, Jung Da-kyung, Baek Hyung-hoon (Hpresso), Park Hyun-soo (singer, born 1993) (Letteamor)
Episodes 341 – 342

Episode 341

Episode 341 was broadcast on January 23, 2022. This marks the beginning of the Hundred-seventieth Generation.

Order	Stage Name	Real Name	Song	Original artist	Vote
Round 1
Pair 1	Old Boy	Lee Jae-sung	The Flight (비상)	Yim Jae-beom	19
Pair 1	Fried Dumplings	Yang Hee-seung	The Flight (비상)	Yim Jae-beom	2
2nd Song	Pan-fried Dumplings	Yang Hee-seung	Slamdunk Opening (The Way to Go to You) (슬램덩크 오프닝 (너에게로 가는 길))	Park Sang-min	—
Pair 2	Happy Ending	Eunha of Viviz	Sweet Heart (오빠야)	Seenroot	11
Pair 2	Poetic Justice	Kwon Jin-young	Sweet Heart (오빠야)	Seenroot	10
2nd Song	Poetic Justice	Kwon Jin-young	No No No No No (노노노노노)	Ha Soo-bin	—
Pair 3	Game of Slap-Match	Jonathan	With Love (사랑으로)	Sunflower	1
Pair 3	Playing Yut	Jung Da-kyung	With Love (사랑으로)	Sunflower	20
2nd Song	Game of Slap-Match	Jonathan	Beautiful World (아름다운 세상)	Park Hak-gi	—
Pair 4	Older Brother is Street Singer	Baek Hyung-hoon of Hpresso	A Year Gone By (일년이면)	Wheesung	10
Pair 4	Dad Is a Salaryman	Park Hyun-soo of Letteamor	A Year Gone By (일년이면)	Wheesung	11
2nd Song	Older Brother is Street Singer	Baek Hyung-hoon of Hpresso	Rose of Versailles (베르사이유의 장미)	Nemesis	—

Episode 342

Episode 342 was broadcast on January 30, 2022.

Order	Stage Name	Real Name	Song	Original artist	Vote
Opening	Mung-bean Pancake Gentleman	Johnny Lee	Light and Shadow (빛과 그림자)	Patti Kim	—
Round 2
Pair 1	Old Boy	Lee Jae-sung	My Love too Far to Have Near (가까이하기엔 너무 먼 당신)	Lee Kwang-jo	18
Pair 1	Happy Ending	Eunha of Viviz	Garden in the Air (공중정원)	BoA	3
Pair 2	Playing Yut	Jung Da-kyung	Brown Recollection (갈색추억)	Han Hye-jin	4
Pair 2	Dad Is a Salaryman	Park Hyun-soo of Letteamor	Waiting (...ing OST) (기다림)	Lee Seung-yeol	17
Round 3
Finalists	Old Boy	Lee Jae-sung	Everyone (여러분)	Yoon Bok-hee	9
Finalists	Dad Is a Salaryman	Park Hyun-soo of Letteamor	Dear Name (이름에게)	IU	12
Special	Old Boy	Lee Jae-sung	Candle Party (촛불잔치)	Lee Jae-sung	—
Final
Battle	Dad Is a Salaryman	Park Hyun-soo of Letteamor	Previous three songs used as voting standard		14
Battle	Winter Kid	Lee Mu-jin	I Didn't Know That Time (그땐 미처 알지 못했지)	Lee Juck	7

=== 171st Generation Mask King ===
- Contestants: Kim So-yeon, Seo Ji-oh, Park Chan-min, Park Jeong-woo (singer) (Treasure), Lee Ga-eun (Page), Jung Tae-seok (Kona), Ben, Kim Yo-han
Episodes 343 – 344

Episode 343

Episode 343 was broadcast on February 6, 2022. This marks the beginning of the Hundred-seventy-first Generation.

Order	Stage Name	Real Name	Song	Original artist	Vote
Round 1
Pair 1	Rice Noodles	Kim So-yeon	Man (사내)	Na Hoon-a	11
Pair 1	Banquet Noodles	Seo Ji-oh	Man (사내)	Na Hoon-a	10
2nd Song	Banquet Noodles	Seo Ji-oh	Strangers Again (도로남)	Kim Myung-ae	—
Pair 2	Example Taxi	Park Chan-min	Is It Still Beautiful (여전히 아름다운지)	Toy	3
Pair 2	Limousine	Park Jeong-woo of Treasure	Is It Still Beautiful (여전히 아름다운지)	Toy	18
2nd Song	Example Taxi	Park Chan-min	One Day Long Ago (오래전 그날)	Yoon Jong-shin	—
Pair 3	Piggy Bank	Lee Ga-eun of Page	Moon's Fall (달의 몰락)	Kim Hyun-chul	14
Pair 3	If You Are Curious, 500 Won!	Jung Tae-seok of Kona	Moon's Fall (달의 몰락)	Kim Hyun-chul	7
2nd Song	If You Are Curious, 500 Won!	Jung Tae-seok of Kona	Christmas in August OST (8월의 크리스마스)	Han Suk-kyu	—
Special	If You Are Curious, 500 Won!	Jung Tae-seok of Kona	Our Night Is More Beautiful Than Your Day (우리의 밤은 당신의 낮보다 아름답다)	Kona	—
Pair 4	Little Lady	Ben	I Love You	Position	20
Pair 4	Daddy Long Legs	Kim Yo-han	I Love You	Position	1
2nd Song	Daddy Long Legs	Kim Yo-han	I Love You	Cha Tae-hyun	—

Episode 344

Episode 344 was broadcast on February 20, 2022.

Order	Stage Name	Real Name	Song	Original artist	Vote
Round 2
Pair 1	Rice Noodles	Kim So-yeon	A Throwing Stone (돌팔매)	Oh Eun-joo	16
Pair 1	Limousine	Park Jeong-woo of Treasure	If It Was Me (나였으면)	Na Yoon-kwon	5
Pair 2	Piggy Bank	Lee Ga-eun of Page	I Love You (널 사랑해)	Kim Jung-eun	5
Pair 2	Little Lady	Ben	Behind You (너의 뒤에서)	Park Jin-young	16
Special	Piggy Bank	Lee Ga-eun of Page	So That There's No Goodbye (이별이 오지 못하게)	Page	—
Round 3
Finalists	Rice Noodles	Kim So-yeon	The Man in Yellow Shirt (노란 샤쓰의 사나이)	Han Myung-sook	3
Finalists	Little Lady	Ben	You Raise Me Up (그대 나를 일으켜주면)	Car, the Garden	18
Final
Battle	Little Lady	Ben	Previous three songs used as voting standard		16
Battle	Dad Is a Salaryman	Park Hyun-soo of Letteamor	Like the First Feeling (처음 느낌 그대로)	Lee So-ra	5

=== 172nd Generation Mask King ===
- Contestants: Minhee (singer, born 2002) (Cravity), Kogyeol (Up10tion), Jung Yoo-kyung (Rumors), Jeong Ga-eun, Huh Chan-mi, Layone, Kang Joon-woo (singer) (Yook Joong-wan's band), Seo Nam-yong
Episodes 345 – 346

Episode 345

Episode 345 was broadcast on February 27, 2022. This marks the beginning of the Hundred-seventy-second Generation.

Order	Stage Name	Real Name	Song	Original artist	Vote
Round 1
Pair 1	Eol-Juk-A	Minhee of Cravity	Doll (인형)	Lee Ji-hoon	15
Pair 1	Eol-Juk-Co	Kogyeol of Up10tion	Doll (인형)	Lee Ji-hoon	6
2nd Song	Eol-Juk-Co	Kogyeol of Up10tion	Maybe (그랬나봐)	Kim Hyung-joong	—
Pair 2	Bucket List	Jung Yoo-kyung of Rumors	Farewell Trip (이별여행)	Won Mi-yeon	17
Pair 2	Black List	Jeong Ga-eun	Farewell Trip (이별여행)	Won Mi-yeon	4
2nd Song	Black List	Jeong Ga-eun	Even If I Love You (너를 사랑하고도)	Jeon Yoo-na	—
Pair 3	Fresher	Huh Chan-mi	Everytime	Chen & Punch	20
Pair 3	Returning Student	Layone	Everytime	Chen & Punch	1
2nd Song	Returning Student	Layone	Three People (세 사람)	Toy & Sung Si-kyung	—
Pair 4	Acorn	Kang Joon-woo of Yook Joong-wan's band	Like a Bird (새들처럼)	Byun Jin-sub	17
Pair 4	Recovery Card	Seo Nam-yong	Like a Bird (새들처럼)	Byun Jin-sub	4
2nd Song	Recovery Card	Seo Nam-yong	Chalang Chalang (찰랑찰랑)	Lee Ja-yeon	—

Episode 346

Episode 346 was broadcast on March 6, 2022.

Order	Stage Name	Real Name	Song	Original artist	Vote
Round 2
Pair 1	Eol-Juk-A	Minhee of Cravity	Good for You	Eric Nam	6
Pair 1	Bucket List	Jung Yoo-kyung of Rumors	Unreasonable Reason (이유같지 않은 이유)	Park Mi-kyung	15
Pair 2	Fresher	Huh Chan-mi	Winter Rose (겨울 장미)	Lee Eun-ha	6
Pair 2	Acorn	Kang Joon-woo of Yook Joong-wan's band	Love Story of a Country Boy (산골 소년의 사랑이야기)	Yemin	15
Round 3
Finalists	Bucket List	Jung Yoo-kyung of Rumors	Love, Never Fade (사랑, 결코 시들지 않는...)	Seomoon Tak	11
Finalists	Acorn	Kang Joon-woo of Yook Joong-wan's band	Piled Up with Longing (그리움만 쌓이네)	Yeojin	10
Final
Battle	Bucket List	Jung Yoo-kyung of Rumors	Previous three songs used as voting standard		6
Battle	Little Lady	Ben	That's Enough (이제 그만)	Lee So-ra	15
Special	Bucket List	Jung Yoo-kyung of Rumors	Storm	Rumors	—

=== 173rd Generation Mask King ===
- Contestants: Jundoy (Lazybone), Park Kyung-hwan (Jaejoo Boys), Yoo Hee-kwan, Yang Ha-young, Park Eun-young, Jihan (singer) (Weeekly), Michelle Lee, Ri.hey (CocaNButter)
Episodes 347 – 348

Episode 347

Episode 347 was broadcast on March 13, 2022. This marks the beginning of the Hundred-seventy-third Generation.

Order	Stage Name	Real Name	Song	Original artist	Vote
Round 1
Pair 1	Genuine Luxury	Jundoy of Lazybone	To You (너에게)	Kim Gun-mo	16
Pair 1	Pawnshop	Park Kyung-hwan of Jaejoo Boys	To You (너에게)	Kim Gun-mo	5
2nd Song	Pawnshop	Park Kyung-hwan of Jaejoo Boys	Another Start (또 다른 시작)	Seo Ji-won	—
Pair 2	Madeleine	Yoo Hee-kwan	Cannot Have You (가질 수 없는 너)	Bank	1
Pair 2	Financier	Yang Ha-young	Cannot Have You (가질 수 없는 너)	Bank	20
2nd Song	Madeleine	Yoo Hee-kwan	Ways to Avoid the Sun (태양을 피하는 방법)	Rain	—
Pair 3	Gonggi	Park Eun-young	Dreams Come True	S.E.S.	2
Pair 3	Gomujulnori	Jihan of Weeekly	Dreams Come True	S.E.S.	19
2nd Song	Gonggi	Park Eun-young	You Are Different (Nonstop 4 OST) (그댄 달라요)	Han Ye-seul	—
Pair 4	Gotta Go	Michelle Lee	Hush	Miss A	18
Pair 4	24 Hours Is Not Enough	Ri.hey of CocaNButter	Hush	Miss A	3
2nd Song	24 Hours Is Not Enough	Ri.hey of CocaNButter	Life Is Good (인생은 즐거워)	Jessica H.O	—

Episode 348

Episode 348 was broadcast on March 20, 2022.

Order	Stage Name	Real Name	Song	Original artist	Vote
Round 2
Pair 1	Genuine Luxury	Jundoy of Lazybone	I Just Walked (그냥 걸었어)	Im Jong-hwan	7
Pair 1	Financier	Yang Ha-young	A Wedding Proposal (청혼)	Lee So-ra	14
Special	Genuine Luxury	Jundoy of Lazybone	Go! West (우리의 힘을...)	Lazybone	—
Pair 2	Gomujulnori	Jihan of Weeekly	You and I (너랑 나)	IU	6
Pair 2	Gotta Go	Michelle Lee	Anna	Jaurim	15
Round 3
Finalists	Financier	Yang Ha-young	I Will Give Everything to You (나 그대에게 모두 드리리)	Lee Jang-hee	10
Finalists	Gotta Go	Michelle Lee	I	Taeyeon ft. Verbal Jint	11
Special	Financier	Yang Ha-young	Heartburn (가슴앓이)	Yang Ha-young	—
Final
Battle	Gotta Go	Michelle Lee	Previous three songs used as voting standard		8
Battle	Little Lady	Ben	Grasshopper's Love (애송이의 사랑)	Yangpa	13

=== 174th Generation Mask King ===
- Contestants: Ida Daussy, Park Dae-bong (The Virile Sons), Yoon Gong-joo, Gabee (LACHICA), Im Do-hyung, Kim Yoo-ha (singer), Kim Bo-reum, Min
Episodes 349 – 350

Episode 349

Episode 349 was broadcast on March 27, 2022. This marks the beginning of the Hundred-seventy-fourth Generation.

Order	Stage Name	Real Name	Song	Original artist	Vote
Round 1
Pair 1	One More Step	Ida Daussy	Soyang River Lady (소양강 처녀)	Kim Tae-hee	3
Pair 1	Running	Park Dae-bong of The Virile Sons	Soyang River Lady (소양강 처녀)	Kim Tae-hee	18
2nd Song	One More Step	Ida Daussy	Gimbap (김밥)	The Jadu	—
Pair 2	Champagne	Yoon Gong-joo	Mirotic (주몬-MIROTIC-)	TVXQ	15
Pair 2	Kimchi Soup	Gabee of LACHICA	Mirotic (주몬-MIROTIC-)	TVXQ	6
2nd Song	Kimchi Soup	Gabee of LACHICA	Rose of Betrayal (배반의 장미)	Uhm Jung-hwa	—
Pair 3	Chafer	Im Do-hyung	Gypsy Woman (집시여인)	Lee Chi-hyun	4
Pair 3	Mayfly	Kim Yoo-ha	Gypsy Woman (집시여인)	Lee Chi-hyun	17
2nd Song	Chafer	Im Do-hyung	Forever (영영)	Na Hoon-a	—
Pair 4	7 Years of Love	Kim Bo-reum	It Hurts (Slow) (아파 (Slow))	2NE1	3
Pair 4	Miracle in Cell No. 11	Min	It Hurts (Slow) (아파 (Slow))	2NE1	18
2nd Song	7 Years of Love	Kim Bo-reum	I'm Not Alone (혼자가 아닌 나)	Seo Young-eun	—

Episode 350

Episode 350 was broadcast on April 3, 2022.

Order	Stage Name	Real Name	Song	Original artist	Vote
Opening	So Chan-whee & Hynn		A Smart Choice (현명한 선택)	So Chan-whee	—
Round 2
Pair 1	Running	Park Dae-bong of The Virile Sons	Where is the End of Your Separation (이별의 끝은 어디인가요)	Yang Soo-kyung	5
Pair 1	Champagne	Yoon Gong-joo	The Song that Only I Can Sing (나만 부를 수 있는 노래)	Sea Route (Gill & Bada)	16
Pair 2	Mayfly	Kim Yoo-ha	Tears	So Chan-whee	13
Pair 2	Miracle in Cell No. 11	Min	One Fine Spring Day (봄날은 간다)	Kim Yoon-ah	8
Round 3
Finalists	Champagne	Yoon Gong-joo	Invitation for Me (나에게로의 초대)	Jung Kyung-hwa	11
Finalists	Mayfly	Kim Yoo-ha	The Magic Castle (마법의 성)	The Classic	10
Final
Battle	Champagne	Yoon Gong-joo	Previous three songs used as voting standard		1
Battle	Little Lady	Ben	Gashina (가시나)	Sunmi	20

=== 175th Generation Mask King ===
- Contestants: Kim Joo-hee, Seo Young-eun, Yoon Hang-gi, Jaegal Sung-yeol, Jae Ha, Kwon Eun-bi, Myunghan (High4), Jeong Hong-il
Episodes 351 – 352

Episode 351

Episode 351 was broadcast on April 10, 2022. This marks the beginning of the Hundred-seventy-fifth Generation.

Order	Stage Name	Real Name	Song	Original artist	Vote
Round 1
Pair 1	Sesame Leaf Controversy	Kim Joo-hee	Want and Resent (원하고 원망하죠)	As One	3
Pair 1	Shrimp Debate	Seo Young-eun	Want and Resent (원하고 원망하죠)	As One	18
2nd Song	Sesame Leaf Controversy	Kim Joo-hee	If You Give Your Heart to Me (너의 마음을 내게 준다면)	Choi Yeon-je	—
Pair 2	1% of Grandfather	Yoon Hang-gi	Love Me Too (내게도 사랑이)	Ham Joong-ah	19
Pair 2	99% of Effort	Jaegal Sung-yeol	Love Me Too (내게도 사랑이)	Ham Joong-ah	2
2nd Song	99% of Effort	Jaegal Sung-yeol	I Have No Problem (나는 문제없어)	Hwang Gyu-young	—
Pair 3	Half the Sound	Jae Ha	Love Scenario (사랑을 했다)	iKon	2
Pair 3	Half the Rice	Kwon Eun-bi	Love Scenario (사랑을 했다)	iKon	19
2nd Song	Half the Sound	Jae Ha	Wind Flower Girl (꽃바람 여인)	Jo Seung-goo	—
Pair 4	Crispy Rice Crust	Myunghan of High4	Though You're Leave Me (그대 떠나가도)	Jo Jang-hyuk	7
Pair 4	Nureongi	Jeong Hong-il	Though You're Leave Me (그대 떠나가도)	Jo Jang-hyuk	14
2nd Song	Crispy Rice Crust	Myunghan of High4	It's Love (사랑인걸)	Mose	—

Episode 352

Episode 352 was broadcast on April 17, 2022.

Order	Stage Name	Real Name	Song	Original artist	Vote
Round 2
Pair 1	Shrimp Debate	Seo Young-eun	Shiny Star (밤하늘의 별을)	KyoungSeo	6
Pair 1	1% of Grandfather	Yoon Hang-gi	Lose Where Go My Mind (내 마음 갈 곳을 잃어)	Choi Baek-ho	15
Special	Shrimp Debate	Seo Young-eun	I'm Not Alone (혼자가 아닌 나)	Seo Young-eun	—
Pair 2	Half the Rice	Kwon Eun-bi	Comet (혜성)	Younha	8
Pair 2	Nureongi	Jeong Hong-il	Amazing You (그대라는 사치)	Han Dong-geun	13
Round 3
Finalists	1% of Grandfather	Yoon Hang-gi	Love Always Run Away (사랑은 늘 도망가)	Lee Moon-sae	7
Finalists	Nureongi	Jeong Hong-il	Diamond (돌덩이) (Itaewon Class OST)	Ha Hyun-woo	14
Special	1% of Inspiration	Yoon Hang-gi	I Will Be Happy (나는 행복합니다); Go to the Beach (해변으로 가요)	Yoon Hang-gi	—
Final
Battle	Nureongi	Jeong Hong-il	Previous three songs used as voting standard		17
Battle	Little Lady	Ben	Scattered Days (흩어진 나날들)	Kang Susie	4

=== 176th Generation Mask King ===
- Contestants: Ace (singer) (Paran), Shin Min-cheol (T-max), Yoon Tae-jin, Kang Tae-kwan, Kim Ha-young, Soyeon ((G)I-dle), Kim Seung-jin, Do Dae-yoon (Togeworl)
Episodes 353 – 354

Episode 353

Episode 353 was broadcast on May 1, 2022. This marks the beginning of the Hundred-seventy-sixth Generation.

Order	Stage Name	Real Name	Song	Original artist	Vote
Round 1
Pair 1	Lamb Skewers	Ace of Paran	Come Back to Me (와줘..)	Seven	9
Pair 1	Chicken Kebabs	Shin Min-cheol of T-max	Come Back to Me (와줘..)	Seven	12
2nd Song	Lamb Skewers	Ace of Paran	Coward (겁쟁이)	Buzz	—
Pair 2	Tripitaka Koreana	Yoon Tae-jin	Born Again (다시 태어나도)	Kim Don-gyu & Esther	1
Pair 2	Colonoscopy	Kang Tae-kwan	Born Again (다시 태어나도)	Kim Don-gyu & Esther	20
2nd Song	Tripitaka Koreana	Yoon Tae-jin	Nice to Meet You (잘 부탁드립니다)	EX	—
Pair 3	Whistle	Kim Ha-young	Ugly	2NE1	3
Pair 3	Flowery Wind	Soyeon of (G)I-dle	Ugly	2NE1	18
2nd Song	Whistle	Kim Ha-young	Love and War (Narr. Haha) (사랑과 전쟁)	Davichi	—
Pair 4	Star in My Heart	Kim Seung-jin	As Time Goes By (세월이 가면)	Choi Ho-seop	17
Pair 4	Ask the Stars	Do Dae-yoon of Togeworl	As Time Goes By (세월이 가면)	Choi Ho-seop	4
2nd Song	Ask the Stars	Do Dae-yoon of Togeworl	Into the New World (다시 만난 세계)	Girls' Generation	—

Episode 354

Episode 354 was broadcast on May 8, 2022.

Order	Stage Name	Real Name	Song	Original artist	Vote
Round 2
Pair 1	Chicken Kebabs	Shin Min-cheol of T-max	Black Glasses (까만안경)	Eru	17
Pair 1	Colonoscopy	Kang Tae-kwan	I'll Get Over You (잊을게)	YB	4
Pair 2	Flowery Wind	Soyeon of (G)I-dle	Two Melodies (뻔한 멜로디)	Zion.T ft. Crush	5
Pair 2	Star in My Heart	Kim Seung-jin	Sad Ocean (슬픈 바다)	Jo Jeong-hyun	16
Round 3
Finalists	Chicken Kebabs	Shin Min-cheol of T-max	Ari Ari Yo (아리아리요)	Joo Byung-seon	8
Finalists	Star in My Heart	Kim Seung-jin	Write Love with a Pencil (사랑은 연필로 쓰세요)	Jeon Young-rok	13
Final
Battle	Star in My Heart	Kim Seung-jin	Previous three songs used as voting standard		2
Battle	Nureongi	Jeong Hong-il	I Shout Myself (나를 외치다)	Maya	19
Special	Star in My Heart	Kim Seung-jin	Susanne (스잔)	Kim Seung-jin	—

=== 177th Generation Mask King ===
- Contestants: Lee Yeon-kyung, Meenoi, Jun U-KISS/UNB, Kim Ji-seon, Pyeon Seung-yup, Ahn Jae-hyung, Jun. K (2PM), MR.BOOMBOX
Episodes 355 – 356

Episode 355

Episode 355 was broadcast on May 15, 2022. This marks the beginning of the Hundred-seventy-seventh Generation.

Order	Stage Name	Real Name	Song	Original artist	Vote
Round 1
Pair 1	Mother	Lee Yeon-kyung	Round and Round (빙글빙글)	Na-mi	6
Pair 1	Mackerel	Meenoi	Round and Round (빙글빙글)	Na-mi	15
2nd Song	Mother	Lee Yeon-kyung	Dear Young (젊은 그대)	Kim Soo-chul	—
Pair 2	Twenty-Five Twenty-One	Jun of U-KISS/UNB	7 Years of Love (7년간의 사랑)	White	18
Pair 2	One Million Twenty-One, One Million Twenty-Two	Kim Ji-seon	7 Years of Love (7년간의 사랑)	White	3
2nd Song	One Million Twenty-One, One Million Twenty-Two	Kim Ji-seon	I Don't Know (몰라)	Uhm Jung-hwa	—
Pair 3	Lasagna	Pyeon Seung-yup	And My Spledid Times Are Gone (화려한 날은 가고)	Yoo Yeol	17
Pair 3	What Are You Doing?	Ahn Jae-hyung	And My Spledid Times Are Gone (화려한 날은 가고)	Yoo Yeol	4
2nd Song	What Are You Doing?	Ahn Jae-hyung	Love Is Going That Far Away (사랑이 저만치 가네)	Kim Jong-chan	—
Pair 4	Orangutan	Jun. K of 2PM	Love Me Love Me	Winner	9
Pair 4	Orabang	MR.BOOMBOX	Love Me Love Me	Winner	12
2nd Song	Orangutan	Jun. K of 2PM	Sick, Sick Name (아프고 아픈 이름)	Ann One	—

Episode 356

Episode 356 was broadcast on May 22, 2022.

Order	Stage Name	Real Name	Song	Original artist	Vote
Round 2
Pair 1	Mackerel	Meenoi	I Think Of You (널 생각해)	One More Chance	5
Pair 1	Twenty-Five Twenty-One	Jun of U-KISS/UNB	Evasion (피)	Fly to the Sky	16
Pair 2	Lasagna	Pyeon Seung-yup	Sister (누이)	Seol Woon-do	5
Pair 2	Orabang	MR.BOOMBOX	Ideal (이상형)	Busker Busker	16
Special	Lasagna	Pyeon Seung-yup	Chan, Chan, Chan (찬 찬 찬)	Pyeon Seung-yup	-
Round 3
Finalists	Twenty-Five Twenty-One	Jun of U-KISS/UNB (group)	Love Alone (혼자만의 사랑)	Kim Gun-mo	6
Finalists	Orabang	MR.BOOMBOX	Go Back (고백)	Dynamic Duo ft. Choi Jung-in	15
Final
Battle	Orabang	MR.BOOMBOX	Previous three songs used as voting standard		7
Battle	Nureongi	Jeong Hong-il	Goodbye for a Moment	MC the Max	14

=== 178th Generation Mask King ===
- Contestants: You Young, Sung Ah (singer, born 1984) (Vanilla Acoustic), Shin Hyun-hee (Seenroot) Yoo Tae-yang (SF9), Jo Young-gu Sunwoo Yong-nyeo, VJ Charles, Jo Hang-jo
Episode 357 - 358

Episode 357

Episode 357 was broadcast on May 29, 2022. This marks the Hundred seventy-eighth Generation.

Order	Stage Name	Real Name	Song	Original artist	Vote
Round 1
Pair 1	Backpack	You Young	The Red Shoes (분홍신)	IU	26
Pair 1	Iron Bag	Sung Ah of Vanilla Acoustic	The Red Shoes (분홍신)	IU	73
2nd song	Backpack	You Young	Love, Maybe (사랑인가봐)	MeloMance	-
Pair 2	Some	Shin Hyun-hee of Seenroot	Hug Me (안아줘)	Jung Joon-il	61
Pair 2	Do You Smell Something Burning?	Taeyang of SF9	Hug Me (안아줘)	Jung Joon-il	38
2nd song	Do You Smell Something Burning?	Taeyang of SF9	Things To Do Tomorrow (내일 할 일)	Yoon Jong-shin	
Pair 3	Hydrangea	Jo Young-gu	In The Flower Garden (꽃밭에서)	Jung Hoon-hee	82
Pair 3	Rapeseed Flower	Sunwoo Yong-nyeo	In The Flower Garden (꽃밭에서)	Jung Hoon-hee	17
2nd song	Rapeseed Flower	Sunwoo Yong-nyeo	Meeting (만남)	Noh Sa-yeon	
Pair 4	Charles in My House	Charles	Love, on its Solitude (사랑 그 쓸쓸함에 대하여)	Yang Hee-eun	30
Pair 4	Charlie, The Singing Factory	Jo Hang-jo	Love, on its Solitude (사랑 그 쓸쓸함에 대하여)	Yang Hee-eun	69
2nd song	Charles in My House	Charles	My Only Friend (나만의 친구)	Solid	-

Episode 358

Episode 358 was broadcast on June 5, 2022.

Order	Stage Name	Real Name	Song	Original artist	Vote
Round 2
Pair 1	Iron Bag	Sung Ah of Vanilla Acoustic	Beautiful Moment (내 생에 아름다운)	K.Will	19
Pair 1	Some	Shin Hyun-hee of Seenroot	Love... That Guy (사랑.. 그 놈)	Bobby Kim	80
Pair 2	Hydrangea	Jo Young-gu	My Starry Love (별빛 같은 나의 사랑아)	Lim Young-woong	17
Pair 2	Charlie, The Singing Factory	Cho Hang-jo	Last Love (끝사랑)	Kim Bum-soo	82
Round 3
Finalists	Some	Shin Hyun-hee of Seenroot	Love Sick (사랑앓이)	F.T. Island	39
Finalists	Charlie at Song Factory	Cho Hang-jo	The Days (그날들)	Kim Kwang-seok	60
Special	Some	Shin Hyun-hee of Seenroot	Sweet Heart (오빠야)	Shin Hyun-hee	
Final
Battle	Charlie, The Singing Factory	Cho Hang-jo	Previous three songs used as voting standard		16
Battle	Nureongi	Jeong Hong-il	Running Across the Sky (하늘을 달리다)	Lee Juck	83

=== 179th Generation Mask King ===
- Contestants: Park Young-mi Jeon Mi-kyung, Lee Chang-myung, Choi Young-woo, Park Sun-yeong, Yong-guk (B.A.P), Julian Quintart, Lee Byeo-ri Forte di Quattro
Episode 359 - 360

Episode 359

Episode 359 was broadcast on June 12, 2022. This marks the Hundred seventy-ninth Generation.

Order	Stage Name	Real Name	Song	Original artist	Vote
Round 1
Pair 1	V	Park Young-mi	Invisible Love (보이지 않는 사랑)	Shin Seung-hun	61
Pair 1	V-shaped Face	Jeon Mi-kyung	Invisible Love (보이지 않는 사랑)	Shin Seung-hun	38
2nd song	V-shaped Face	Jeon Mi-kyung	Forgotten Season (잊혀진 계절)	Lee Yong (singer)	-
Pair 2	Yodel	Lee Chang-myung	It's Art (예술이야)	Psy	9
Pair 2	Acapella	Choi Young-woo	It's Art (예술이야)	Psy	90
2nd song	Yodel	Lee Chang-myung	That Probably Is (아마도 그건)	Choi Yong-joon (singer)	-
Pair 3	Blue Chip	Park Sun-yeong	Officially Missing You, Too	Geeks (musical duo) & Soyou	14
Pair 3	Big Baby	Yongguk of B.A.P	Officially Missing You, Too	Geeks (musical duo) & Soyou	85
2nd song	Blue Chip	Park Sun-yeong	Someday (언젠가는)	Lee Tzsche	-
Pair 4	Lettuce Wrap	Julian Quintart	The Moon of Seoul (서울의 달)	Kim Gun-mo	13
Pair 4	Fighting Chicken	Lee Byeo-ri of Forte di Quattro	The Moon of Seoul (서울의 달)	Kim Gun-mo	86
2nd song	Lettuce Wrap	Julian Quintart	I've Heard Rumors (풍문으로 들었소)	Johnson Hahm	-

Episode 360

Episode 360 was broadcast on June 19, 2022.

Order	Stage Name	Real Name	Song	Original artist	Vote
Round 2
Pair 1	V	Park Young-mi	Childish Adult (어른 아이)	Gummy (singer)	61
Pair 1	Acapella	Choi Young-woo	Footsteps (발걸음)	Emerald Castle	38
Pair 2	Big Baby	Yongguk of B.A.P	Tomboy	(G)I-dle	12
Pair 2	Fighting Chicken	Lee Byeo-ri of Forte di Quattro	Making a New Ending for This Story (이 소설의 끝을 다시 써보려 해)	Han Dong-geun	87
Round 3
Finalists	V	Park Young-mi	Fall in Fall (가을 타나 봐)	Vibe (South Korean band)	22
Finalists	Fighting Chicken	Lee Byeo-ri of Forte di Quattro	Knots (매듭)	Lee Juck	77
Special	V	Park Young-mi	I'm Loneliness, You're Sadness (나는 외로움 그대는 그리움)	Park Young-mi	-
Final
Battle	Fighting Chicken	Lee Byeo-ri of Forte di Quattro	Previous three songs used as voting standard		18
Battle	Nureongi	Jeong Hong-il	Sad Present (슬픈 선물)	Kim Jang-hoon	81

=== 180th Generation Mask King ===
- Contestants: Swan (singer) (Purple Kiss), Song I-han, Park Seung-hi, Kim Su-hyeon, Jin Yang-hye, Yun Young-ah, Lee Man-bok, Jeok Woo
Episode 361 - 362

Episode 361

Episode 361 was broadcast on June 26, 2022. This marks the Hundred eightieth Generation.

Order	Stage Name	Real Name	Song	Original artist	Vote
Round 1
Pair 1	Twisted Breadstick	Swan	Love Me Once Again (미워도 다시 한번)	Vibe (South Korean band)	59
Pair 1	Street Toast	Song I-han	Love Me Once Again (미워도 다시 한번)	Vibe (South Korean band)	40
2nd song	Street Toast	Song I-han	Did You Forget (잊었니)	Lee Seung-chul	-
Pair 2	Hey Mama	Park Seung-hi	I Love You (너를 사랑해)	S.E.S	12
Pair 2	Bigmama	Kim Su-hyeon	I Love You (너를 사랑해)	S.E.S	87
2nd song	Hey Mama	Park Seung-hi	You Will Be Happy Without Me (그댄 행복에 살텐데)	Leeds (singer)	-
Pair 3	Ghosting Breakup	Jin Yang-hye	No More Love From Now On (사랑은 이제 그만)	Min Hae-kyung	14
Pair 3	Transfer Breakup	Yun Young-ah	No More Love From Now On (사랑은 이제 그만)	Min Hae-kyung	85
2nd song	Ghosting Breakup	Jin Yang-hye	First Impression (첫인상)	Kim Gun-mo	-
Pair 4	Mysterious	Lee Man-bok	The Shadow of Parting (이별의 그늘)	Yoon Sang	17
Pair 4	Starfish	Jeok Woo	The Shadow of Parting (이별의 그늘)	Yoon Sang	82
2nd song	Mysterious	Lee Man-bok	Last Night's Story (어젯밤 이야기)	Sobangcha	-

Episode 362

Episode 362 was broadcast on July 3, 2022.

Order	Stage Name	Real Name	Song	Original artist	Vote
Round 2
Pair 1	Twisted Breadstick	Swan	Love Shot (EXO song)	EXO	60
Pair 1	Bigmama	Kim Su-hyeon	One More Day (하루만 더)	Big Mama	39
Special	Bigmama	Kim Su-hyeon	As Time Goes By (시간이 흐른 뒤)	Yoon Mi-rae	-
Pair 2	Transfer Breakup	Yun Young-ah	As If It's Your Last (마지막처럼)	Blackpink	30
Pair 2	Starfish	Jeok Woo	Whisky On The Rock	Choi Sung-soo	69
Special	Transfer Breakup	Yun Young-ah	Mini Date (미니 데이트)	Yun Young-ah	-
Round 3
Finalists	Twisted Breadstick	Swan	Wi Ing Wi Ing (위잉위잉)	Hyukoh	42
Finalists	Starfish	Jeok Woo	Belief (믿음)	Lee So-ra (singer)	57
Final
Battle	Starfish	Jeok Woo	Previous three songs used as voting standard		25
Battle	Nureongi	Jeong Hong-il	While We Live in This World (이세상 살아가다 보면)	Lee Moon-sae	74

=== 181st Generation Mask King ===
- Contestants: Ralral, Cha Jun-ho (Drippin), Taemi, You Chae-hoon (La Poem), Ji Hyun-woo, Lee Sang-in, Jung Beom-kyun, Kim Ye-ji (born 1996) (KARDI (band))
Episode 363 - 364

Episode 363

Episode 363 was broadcast on July 10, 2022.

Order	Stage Name	Real Name	Song	Original artist	Vote
Round 1
Pair 1	Yangyang Surfing	Ralral	La La La (라라라)	Lee Soo-young	51
Pair 1	Gapyeong Barge	Cha Jun-ho of Drippin	La La La (라라라)	Lee Soo-young	48
2nd song	Gapyeong Barge	Cha Jun-ho of Drippin	Don't Go Today (오늘은 가지마)	Im Se-jun	-
Pair 2	Braised Chicken Instead of Pheasant	Taemi	I Will Show You (보여줄게)	Ailee	7
Pair 2	Snow Crab after Chicken	You Chae-hoon of La Poem	I Will Show You (보여줄게)	Ailee	92
2nd song	Braised Chicken Instead of Pheasant	Taemi	Romantic Cat (낭만 고양이)	Cherry Filter	-
Pair 3	Sideburns	Ji Hyun-woo	You Are The Only One (오직 하나뿐인 그대)	Shim Shin	35
Pair 3	Belly Hair	Lee Sang-in	You Are The Only One (오직 하나뿐인 그대)	Shim Shin	64
2nd song	Sideburns	Ji Hyun-woo	Dream of a Freshwater Eel (민물장어의 꿈)	Shin Hae-chul	-
Pair 4	Ugly Dolls	Jung Beom-kyun	Drunken Truth (취중진담)	Kim Dong-ryul	8
Pair 4	Indian Doll	Kim Ye-ji of KARDI	Drunken Truth (취중진담)	Kim Dong-ryul	91
2nd song	Ugly Dolls	Jung Beom-kyun	Beautiful Restriction (아름다운 구속)	Kim Jong-seo	-

Episode 364

Episode 364 was broadcast on July 17, 2022.

Order	Stage Name	Real Name	Song	Original artist	Vote
Round 2
Pair 1	Yangyang Surfing	Ralral	Lonely	2NE1	27
Pair 1	Snow Crab after Chicken	Yoo Chae-hoon of La Poem	I'm Sorry	CNBLUE	72
Pair 2	Belly Hair	Lee Sang-in	Gangster (야인)	Im Kang-sung	1
Pair 2	Indian Doll	Kim Ye-ji of KARDI	You Are Tearful (그대는 눈물겹다)	M.C the Max	98
Round 3
Finalists	Snow Crab after Chicken	Yoo Chae-hoon of La Poem	Farewell Taxi (이별택시)	Kim Yeon-woo	8
Finalists	Indian Doll	Kim Ye-ji of KARDI	It Is (있지)	Jaurim	91
Special	Snow Crab after Chicken	Yoo Chae-hoon of La Poem	Il Mondo	Jimmy Fontana	-
Final
Battle	Indian Doll	Kim Ye-ji of KARDI	Previous three songs used as voting standard		84
Battle	Nureongi	Jeong Hong-il	Riding The Taxi (택시를 타고)	Kwak Jin-eon	15

=== 182nd Generation Mask King ===
- Contestants: Yoon Deok-won (Broccoli, You Too?), Kim Jung-ah (After School), Hongja, Kim Sae-rom, Kang Han (bobsledder), Baek Seung-il, Kim Hwan (South Korean television presenter), Ha Sung-woon (Wanna One)/(Hotshot)
Episode 365 - 366

Episode 365

Episode 365 was broadcast on July 24, 2022.

Order	Stage Name	Real Name	Song	Original artist	Vote
Round 1
Pair 1	Dolphin	Yoon Deok-won	Cold (감기)	Lee Ki-chan	32
Pair 1	Muffin	Jung Ah of After School	Cold (감기)	Lee Ki-chan	67
2nd song	Dolphin	Yoon Deok-won	Annie	Yoon Jong-shin	-
Pair 2	Stalk Hair	Hong Ja	Happy Me (행복한 나를)	Eco (music group)	92
Pair 2	Perilla Leaf Hair	Kim Sae-rom	Happy Me (행복한 나를)	Eco (music group)	7
2nd song	Perilla Leaf Hair	Kim Sae-rom	Gee	Girls' Generation	-
Pair 3	Just One Vote	Kang Han	Love Battery (사랑의 배터리)	Hong Jin-young	12
Pair 3	Just One Bite	Baek Seung-il	Love Battery (사랑의 배터리)	Hong Jin-young	87
2nd song	Just One Vote	Kang Han	As I Say (말하는 대로)	Sagging Snail	-
Pair 4	Itaewon Freedom	Kim Hwan	I Love You (사랑합니다)	Tim (singer)	11
Pair 4	DJ Bbong Dis Party	Ha Sung-woon	I Love You (사랑합니다)	Tim (singer)	88
2nd song	Itaewon Freedom	Kim Hwan	Show	Kim Won-jun	-

Episode 366

Episode 366 was broadcast on July 31, 2022.

Order	Stage Name	Real Name	Song	Original artist	Vote
Round 2
Pair 1	Muffin	Jung Ah of After School	Sad Salsa	Baek Ji-young	18
Pair 1	Stalk Hair	Hong Ja	I'm Breaking Up Myself (헤어지는 중입니다)	Lee Eun-mi	81
Pair 2	Just One Bite	Baek Seung-il	The Face I Miss (보고싶은 얼굴)	Min Hae-kyung	8
Pair 2	DJ Bbong Dis Party	Ha Sung-woon	When I Stand Under the Shade of a Roadside (가로수 그늘 아래 서면)	Lee Moon-sae	91
Round 3
Finalists	Stalk Hair	Hong Ja	I Tried Everything (별짓 다 해봤는데)	Ali (South Korean singer)	26
Finalists	DJ Bbong Dis Party	Ha Sung-woon	Breath (숨)	Park Hyo-shin	73
Final
Battle	DJ Bbong Dis Party	Ha Sung-woon	Previous three songs used as voting standard		29
Battle	Indian Doll	Kim Ye-ji of KARDI	I Am Returning (나 돌아가)	Lim Jeong-hee	70

=== 183rd Generation Mask King ===
- Contestants: Haeyoon (Cherry Bullet), Kim Hye-jung (born 1968) (Seabird), Lee Solomon (singer), Alan Kim, Lee Sung-wook (singer) (R.ef), Shin Gi-ru (comedian), Ryan S. Jhun, Geegooin (rapper) (Rhythm Power)
Episode 367 - 368

Episode 367

Episode 367 was broadcast on August 7, 2022.

Order	Stage Name	Real Name	Song	Original artist	Vote
Round 1
Pair 1	I'm Your Mother	Haeyoon of Cherry Bullet	I Can't Say (뭐라고 딱 꼬집어 얘기할 수 없어요)	Love & Peace (musical group)	31
Pair 1	Do I Look Like Your Mother?	Kim Hye-jung of Seabird	I Can't Say (뭐라고 딱 꼬집어 얘기할 수 없어요)	Love & Peace (musical group)	68
2nd song	I'm Your Mother	Haeyoon of Cherry Bullet	Counting Our Kisses (당신과의 키스를 세어보아요)	Hwayobi	-
Pair 2	Cool Guy	Lee Solomon	Butter	BTS	81
Pair 2	Hot Guy	Alan Kim	Butter	BTS	18
2nd song	Hot Guy	Alan Kim	Never Gonna Give You Up	Rick Astley	-
Special	Hot Guy	Alan Kim	Under The Sea	Samuel E. Wright	-
Pair 3	Want To Go See The Ocean?	Lee Sung-wook of R.ef	In The Dead of the Night (모두 잠든 후에)	Kim Won-jun	73
Pair 3	Want To Eat Ramen?	Shin Gi-ru	In The Dead of the Night (모두 잠든 후에)	Kim Won-jun	26
2nd song	Want To Eat Ramen?	Shin Gi-ru	Violet Fragrance (보랏빛 향기)	Kang Susie	-
Pair 4	After Everyone Is Asleep	Ryan S. Jhun	Deep in the Night (밤이 깊었네)	Crying Nut	21
Pair 4	Nineteen Ninety Nine	Geegooin of Rhythm Power	Deep in the Night (밤이 깊었네)	Crying Nut	78
2nd song	After Everyone Is Asleep	Ryan S. Jhun	Dolphin	Oh My Girl	-

Episode 368

Episode 368 was broadcast on August 14, 2022.

Order	Stage Name	Real Name	Song	Original artist	Vote
Round 2
Pair 1	Do I Look Like Your Mother?	Kim Hye-jung of Seabird	I Believe	Shin Seung-hun	8
Pair 1	Cool Guy	Lee Solomon	Love Is Like a Snowflake (사랑은 눈꽃처럼)	Junsu	91
Pair 2	Want To Go See the Ocean?	Lee Sung-wook of R.ef	It Has To Be You (너 아니면 안돼)	Yesung	36
Pair 2	Nineteen Ninety Nine	Geegooin of Rhythm Power	Itaewon Freedom (이태원 프리덤)	UV (music group)	63
Special	Want To Go See the Ocean?	Lee Sung-wook of R.ef	Brilliant Love (찬란한 사랑)	R.ef	-
Round 3
Finalists	Cool Guy	Lee Solomon	From Mark	Ha Dong-kyun	73
Finalists	Nineteen Ninety Nine	Geegooin of Rhythm Power	Heartbreaker	G-Dragon	26
Final
Battle	Cool Guy	Lee Solomon	Previous three songs were used as voting standard		34
Battle	Indian Doll	Kim Ye-ji of KARDI	Time Walking On Memory (기억을 걷는 시간)	Nell (band)	65

=== 184th Generation Mask King ===
- Contestants: Lee Sook, Im Hyuk, Jongho (Ateez), Choi Ye-geun, Yang Sang-guk, Big Naughty, Kim Young-ji, Na Sang-do
Episode 369 - 370

Episode 369

Episode 369 was broadcast on August 21, 2022.

Order	Stage Name	Real Name	Song	Original artist	Vote
Round 1
Pair 1	Warm Tone	Lee Sook	Station in Andong (안동역에서)	Jin Sung (singer)	49
Pair 1	Drinking Tone	Im Hyuk	Station in Andong (안동역에서)	Jin Sung (singer)	50
2nd song	Warm Tone	Lee Sook	Train to The South (남행열차)	Kim Soo-Hee	-
Pair 2	Steamed Cypresses	Jongho of ATEEZ	A Friend's Confession (친구의 고백)	2AM (band)	31
Pair 2	Steamed Eggs	Choi Ye-geun	A Friend's Confession (친구의 고백)	2AM (band)	68
2nd song	Steamed Cypresses	Jongho of ATEEZ	Swing Baby	Park Jin-young	-
Pair 3	Home Vacation	Yang Sang-guk	Long-Lasting Couples (아주 오래된 연인들)	015B	20
Pair 3	Hotel Vacation	Big Naughty	Long-Lasting Couples (아주 오래된 연인들)	015B	79
2nd song	Home Vacation	Yang Sang-guk	People Are More Beautiful Than Flowers (사람이 꽃보다 아름다워)	An Chi-Hwan	-
Pair 4	X-man	Youngji	A Man and A Woman (남과 여)	Park Seon-joo & Kim Bum-soo	60
Pair 4	X-ray	Na Sang-do	A Man and A Woman (남과 여)	Park Seon-joo & Kim Bum-soo	39
2nd song	X-ray	Na Sang-do	This is the Moment (지금 이 순간)	Jekyll & Hyde	-

Episode 370

Episode 370 was broadcast on August 28, 2022.

Order	Stage Name	Real Name	Song	Original artist	Vote
Round 2
Pair 1	Drinking Tone	Im Hyuk	Heartless Blues (무정부르스)	Kang Seung-mo	11
Pair 1	Steamed Eggs	Choi Ye-geun	Feel My Rhythm	Red Velvet (group)	88
Pair 2	Hotel Vacation	Big Naughty	Still Life (봄여름가을겨울)	Big Bang (band)	26
Pair 2	X-Man	Youngji	Immortal Love (불멸의 사랑)	Jo Sung-mo	73
Round 3
Finalists	Steamed Eggs	Choi Ye-geun	How Are You? (어떤가요)	Lee Jeong-bong	30
Finalists	X-Man	Youngji	The Tears From the End of the Seventh Heaven (하늘 끝에서 흘린 눈물)	Junyfore	69
Final
Battle	X-Man	Youngji	Previous three songs were used as voting standard		22
Battle	Indian Doll	Kim Ye-ji of KARDI	Even Though Summer Is Over And What's Left Is Shabby (뜨거운 여름밤은 가고 남은 건 볼품없지만)	Jannabi (band)	77

=== 2022 Chuseok Special: 2nd Generation Duet Mask Kings ===
- Contestants: Bae Seung-min (Golden Child) & Kogyeol (Up10tion), Kwon In-ha & Shim Hyung-rae, Jae Ha & Im Joo-ri, Park Hyun-soo (singer) (Letteamor) & Baek Hyung-hoon (Hpresso), Park Gi-ryang & Baek A-yeon, Kota (Sunny Hill) & Hickee, Kim Do-kyun (Baekdusan) & Kim Kyung-rok (V.O.S), Go Yoo-jin (Flower) & Yook Jung-wan (Yuk Joong-wan Band)
Episode 371 - 373

Episode 371

Episode 371 was broadcast on September 4, 2022. Winner of the special episodes ("Our Friendship Is Within One Vote") revealed their identities through a special performance on the beginning of the 185th Generation Mask King. Pairs 3 and 4 of Round 1 were switched during broadcast.

Order	Stage Name	Real Name	Song	Original artist	Vote
Opening
Opening Stage	Ugly Dolls & Indian Doll	Jeong Beom-kyun & Kim Ye-ji of KARDI	That's A Relief (다행이다)	Lee Juck	—
Round 1
Pair 1	The Grace of Gura	Bae Seung-min of Golden Child & Kogyeol of Up10tion	I Loved You (사랑했어요)	Kim Hyun-sik	55
Pair 1	Diamonds Cuts Diamond	Kwon In-ha & Shim Hyung-rae	I Loved You (사랑했어요)	Kim Hyun-sik	44
2nd song	Diamonds Cuts Diamond	Kwon In-ha & Shim Hyung-rae	Saddle The Wind	Lou Christie	-
Pair 2	You're Far, Too Far Away	Jaeha & Lim Ju-ri	Let's Go On A Trip (여행을 떠나요)	Cho Yong-pil	20
Pair 2	Our Friendship Is Within One Vote	Park Hyun-soo of Letteamor & Baek Hyung-hoon of Hpresso	Let's Go On A Trip (여행을 떠나요)	Cho Yong-pil	79
2nd song	You're Far, Too Far Away	Jaeha & Lim Ju-ri	Tonight (오늘 같은 밤)	Lee Gwang-jo	-
Pair 4	Resurrection Of The Gods	Kim Do-kyun of Baekdusan & Kim Kyeong-rok of V.O.S	La La La (라라라)	SG Wannabe	56
Pair 4	Masked Kings Over Flowers	Ko Yu-jin of Flower & Yuk Joong-wan of Yuk Joong-wan Band	La La La (라라라)	SG Wannabe	43

Episode 372

Episode 372 was broadcast on September 11, 2022.

Order	Stage Name	Real Name	Song	Original artist	Vote
Round 1
2nd song	Masked Kings Over Flowers	Ko Yu-jin of Flower & Yuk Joong-wan of Yuk Joong-wan Band	How Can Love Be Like This (어떻게 사랑이 그래요)	Lee Seung-hwan	-
Pair 3	Goddesses of Tone	Park Ki-ryang & Baek Ah-yeon	When You Return (그대 돌아오면)	Gummy	22
Pair 3	Acorn Sisters	Kota of Sunnyhill & Hickee	When You Return (그대 돌아오면)	Gummy	77
2nd song	Goddesses of Tone	Park Ki-ryang & Baek Ah-yeon	You And I	Park Bom	-
Special
Special	Half Moon Prince & Full Moon Prince	Michael K. Lee & Jibeom of Golden Child	Black or White	Michael Jackson	—
Round 2
Pair 1	The Grace of Gura	Bae Seung-min of Golden Child & Kogyeol of Up10tion	I'll Treat You Well (꽃길만 걷게 해줄께)	Daybreak	10
Pair 1	Our Friendship Is Within One Vote	Park Hyun-soo of Letteamor & Baek Hyung-hoon of Hpresso	Was It Really Love? (정말 사랑했을까)	Brown Eyed Soul	89

Episode 373

Episode 373 was broadcast on September 18, 2022.

Order	Stage Name	Real Name	Song	Original artist	Vote
Round 2
Pair 2	Acorn Sisters	Kota of Sunnyhill & Hickee	U R	Taeyeon	79
Pair 2	Resurrection Of The Gods	Kim Do-kyun of Baekdusan & Kim Kyeong-rok of V.O.S	At the Moonlit Window (달빛 창가에서)	City Kids (도시 아이들)	20
Final
Finalists	Our Friendship Is Within One Vote	Park Hyun-soo of Letteamor & Baek Hyung-hoon of Hpresso	Bus Station (정류장)	Panic	51
Finalists	Acorn Sisters	Kota of Sunnyhill & Hickee	Lost Child (미아)	Lena Park	48

=== 185th Generation Mask King ===
- Contestants: Motte, Park Ji-hoon, Uhm Ji-yoon, Kim Ba-ul, Ha Hyun-sang (Hoppipolla), Kanto, Jeon Young-mi, Shin Yoo
Episodes 373 – 375

Episode 373 was broadcast on September 18, 2022.

Order	Stage Name	Real Name	Song	Original artist	Vote
Special	Our Friendship Is Within One Vote	Park Hyun-soo of Letteamor & Baek Hyung-hoon of Hpresso	Fly (날아)	Lee Seung-yeol	—
Round 1
Pair 1	Attorney	Motte	For The Hesitant Couples (주저하는 연인들을 위해)	Jannabi	41
Pair 1	Rice Farming	Park Ji-hoon	For The Hesitant Couples (주저하는 연인들을 위해)	Jannabi	58

Episode 374

Episode 374 was broadcast on September 25, 2022.

Order	Stage Name	Real Name	Song	Original artist	Vote
Round 1
2nd Song	Attorney	Motte	Strawberry Moon	IU	-
Pair 2	In-Law Meeting Freepass Face	Uhm Ji-yoon	Confession (고백)	Jeong Jun-il	29
Pair 2	Interview Freepass Face	Kim Ba-ul	Confession (고백)	Jeong Jun-il	70
2nd song	In-Law Meeting Freepass Face	Uhm Ji-yoon	Flower Road (꽃길)	Kim Se-jeong	-
Pair 3	Fruit Juice	Ha Hyun-sang of Hoppipolla	Day And Day (하루 하루)	Tashanni (타샤니)	79
Pair 3	Steak Juice	Kanto	Day And Day (하루 하루)	Tashanni (타샤니)	20
2nd song	Steak Juice	Kanto	Father (아버지)	Psy	-
Pair 4	Lottery Winning Mom	Jeon Young-mi	One Million Roses (백만송이 장미)	Sim Soo-bong	31
Pair 4	White Horse Riding Prince	Shin Yu	One Million Roses (백만송이 장미)	Sim Soo-bong	68
2nd song	Lottery Winning Mom	Jeon Young-mi	If I Go To Nasung (나성에 가면)	Sesaem Trio (세샘트리오)	-

Episode 375

Episode 375 was broadcast on October 2, 2022.

Order	Stage Name	Real Name	Song	Original artist	Vote
Round 2
Pair 1	Rice Farming	Park Ji-hoon	Farewell (잘가요)	Jung Jae-wook	16
Pair 1	Interview Freepass Face	Kim Ba-ul	With The Mindset Of Needing To Forget You (잊어야 한다는 마음으로)	Kim Kwang-seok	83
Pair 2	Fruit Juice	Ha Hyun-sang of Hoppipolla	Love Is Remembered As Another Love (사랑이 다른 사랑으로 잊혀지네)	Harim	27
Pair 2	White Horse Riding Prince	Shin Yu	Replay	Kim Dong-ryul	72
Round 3
Finalists	Interview Freepass Face	Kim Ba-ul	Track 9	Lee So-ra	21
Finalists	White Horse Riding Prince	Shin Yu	Love (사랑)	Yim Jae-beom	78
Final
Battle	White Horse Riding Prince	Shin Yu	Previous three songs were used as voting standard		23
Battle	Indian Doll	Kim Ye-ji of KARDI	Poison	Uhm Jung-hwa	76

=== 186th Generation Mask King ===
- Contestants: Pyo Chang-won, Seodo (Seodo Band), Park Jun-seok (Taesaja), Chaeyeon, Park Kwang-seon (Ulala Session), Jung Yu-ji (Uji Bestie (group), Kim Sung-won, Son Jin-wook (DANGGISIO)
Episode 376 - 377

Episode 376

Episode 376 was broadcast on October 9, 2022.

Order	Stage Name	Real Name	Song	Original artist	Vote
Opening		WoongSan	Moondance	Van Morrison	—
Round 1
Pair 1	You Know, Grande	Pyo Chang-won	Regret (아쉬움)	Sinchon Blues	11
Pair 1	When I Was Young	Seodo of Seodo Band	Regret (아쉬움)	Sinchon Blues	88
2nd song	You Know, Grande	Pyo Chang-won	One Thing That I Know (내가 아는 한 가지)	Lee Deok-jin	-
Pair 2	Autumn Leaves	Park Jun-seok of Taesaja	As Much As The Love Spread Around The World (세상에 뿌려진 사랑만큼)	Lee Seung-hwan	25
Pair 2	Autumn Picnic	Chaeyeon	As Much As The Love Spread Around The World (세상에 뿌려진 사랑만큼)	Lee Seung-hwan	74
2nd song	Autumn Leaves	Park Jun-seok	With You (그대와 함께)	The Blue	-
Pair 3	Liberal Arts Boy	Park Kwang-sun of Ulala Session	The Blues Within You (그대안의 블루)	Kim Hyun-cheol & Lee So-ra	38
Pair 3	Natural Science Girl	Jung Yu-ji of Bestie	The Blues Within You (그대안의 블루)	Kim Hyun-cheol & Lee So-ra	61
2nd song	Liberal Arts Boy	Park Kwang-sun of Ulala Session	Speed (스피드)	Kim Gun-mo	-
Pair 4	Green Onion Kimchi	Kim Sung-won	Becoming Dust (먼지가 되어)	Lee Mi-ki	22
Pair 4	Bachelor Kimchi	Son Jin-wook of DANGGISIO	Becoming Dust (먼지가 되어)	Lee Mi-ki	77
2nd song	Green Onion Kimchi	Kim Sung-won	DADDY	Psy	-

Episode 377

Episode 377 was broadcast on October 16, 2022.

Order	Stage Name	Real Name	Song	Original artist	Vote
Round 2
Pair 1	When I Was Young	Seodo of Seodo Band	Fog (안개)	Jeong Hun-hee	85
Pair 1	Autumn Picnic	Chaeyeon	See Through (씨스루)	Primary	14
Pair 2	Natural Science Girl	Jung Yu-ji of Bestie	It Can't Be (그런 일은)	Hwayobi	25
Pair 2	Bachelor Kimchi	Son Jin-wook of DANGGISIO	A Wise Choice (현명한 선택)	So Chan-whee	74
Round 3
Finalists	When I Was Young	Seodo of Seodo Band	I Miss You (그리워해요)	2NE1	15
Finalists	Bachelor Kimchi	Son Jin-wook of DANGGISIO	Castle of Eternity (영원의 성)	Kim Kyung-ho	84
Final
Battle	Bachelor Kimchi	Son Jin-wook of DANGGISIO	Previous three songs were used as voting standard		66
Battle	Indian Doll	Kim Ye-ji of KARDI	Growl (으르렁)	Exo	33

=== 187th Generation Mask King ===
- Contestants: Yoon Chae-won (singer) (Classy), Yeji (GyeongseoYeji), Hur Gyu, Tsuki (singer) (Billlie), Ovan, Park Min-ha, Seomoon Tak, Seo Hyung-wook
Episode 378 - 379

Episode 378

Episode 378 was broadcast on October 23, 2022.

Order	Stage Name	Real Name	Song	Original artist	Vote
Round 1
Pair 1	Liquid Medicine	Yoon Chae-won of Classy	Day By Day	As One	27
Pair 1	Pill	Yeji of GyeongseoYeji	Day By Day	As One	72
2nd song	Liquid Medicine	Yoon Chae-won of Classy	Atlantis Girl (아틀란티스 소녀)	BoA	-
Pair 2	AZ Comedy	Hur Gyu	Like a Dream (꿈처럼)	Ben	35
Pair 2	MZ Generation	Tsuki of Billlie	Like a Dream (꿈처럼)	Ben	64
2nd song	AZ Comedy	Hur Gyu	Lonely Night	Boohwal	-
Pair 3	Mafia Game	Ovan	You And I From The Beginning (처음부터 너와 나)	Bolbbalgan4	73
Pair 3	Truth Game	Park Min-ha	You And I From The Beginning (처음부터 너와 나)	Bolbbalgan4	26
2nd song	Truth Game	Park Min-ha	Ah-Choo	Lovelyz	-
Pair 4	Voice Gifted From The Gods	Seomoon Tak	Addicted Love (중독된 사랑)	Jo Jang-hyuk	91
Pair 4	A Legacy By Given One's Parents	Seo Hyung-wook	Addicted Love (중독된 사랑)	Jo Jang-hyuk	8
2nd song	A Legacy By Given One's Parents	Seo Hyung-wook	If You Enter My Heart (그대 내맘에 들어오면은)	Cho Deok-bae	-

Episode 379

Episode 379 was broadcast on November 6, 2022. It was originally scheduled to air on October 30.

Order	Stage Name	Real Name	Song	Original artist	Vote
Round 2
Pair 1	Pill	Yeji of GyeongseoYeji	For You My Light (오늘도 빛나는 너에게)	Maktub feat. Lee Ra-on	71
Pair 1	MZ Generation	Tsuki of Billlie	Lady Of The Rainy Night (여우야)	The Classic	28
Pair 2	Mafia Game	Ovan	With Me	Wheesung	25
Pair 2	Voice Gifted From The Gods	Seomoon Tak	I Lost My Way For A While (잠시 길을 잃다)	015B feat. Boni	74
Round 3
Finalists	Pill	Yeji of GyeongseoYeji	Sad But Pretending Not To Be (애이불비)	Yangpa	21
Finalists	Voice Gifted From The Gods	Seomoon Tak	Twenty-Five, Twenty-One (스물다섯, 스물하나)	Jaurim	78
Final
Battle	Voice Gifted From The Gods	Seomoon Tak	Previous three songs were used as voting standard		56
Battle	Bachelor Kimchi	Son Jin-wook of DANGGISIO	Swamp (늪)	Jo Kwan-woo	43

=== 188th Generation Mask King ===
- Contestants: Lily (singer, born 2002) ( (Nmixx), Wetboy, Ricky Kim, Ryu Seung-ju, Kim Young-woong, Jung Seung-jae, Kino (Pentagon), Shin Yu-mi
Episode 380 - 381

Episode 380

Episode 380 was broadcast on November 13, 2022.

Order	Stage Name	Real Name	Song	Original artist	Vote
Round 1
Pair 1	Shower with Money	Lily of Nmixx	What Would It Have Been Like? (어땠을까)	Psy ft. Lena Park	80
Pair 1	Give a Person a Scolding	Wetboy	What Would It Have Been Like? (어땠을까)	Psy ft. Lena Park	19
2nd song	Give a Person a Scolding	Wetboy	Crooked (삐딱하게)	G-Dragon	-
Pair 2	Cha In-pyo	Ricky Kim	I Don't Love You (널 사랑하지 않아)	Urban Zakapa	12
Pair 2	Shin Ae-ra	Ryu Seung-ju	I Don't Love You (널 사랑하지 않아)	Urban Zakapa	87
2nd song	Cha In-pyo	Ricky Kim	Alleyway (골목길)	Sinchon Blues	-
Pair 3	Physiognomy	Kim Young-woong	In The Rain (빗속에서)	Lee Moon-sae	25
Pair 3	Lines of the Palm	Jung Seung-jae	In The Rain (빗속에서)	Lee Moon-sae	74
2nd song	Physiognomy	Kim Young-woong	I'm Leaving Too (나도야 간다)	Kim Soo-chul	-
Pair 4	Heavy Metal	Kino of Pentagon	Breakup In The Middle Of The Day (대낮에 한 이별)	Park Jin-young ft. Sunye	26
Pair 4	Rational Mind	Shin Yu-mi	Breakup In The Middle Of The Day (대낮에 한 이별)	Park Jin-young ft. Sunye	73
2nd song	Heavy Metal	Kino of Pentagon	Pink Venom	Blackpink	-

Episode 381

Episode 381 was broadcast on November 20, 2022.

Order	Stage Name	Real Name	Song	Original artist	Vote
Round 2
Pair 1	Shower with Money	Lily of Nmixx	Celebrity	IU	49
Pair 1	Shin Ae-ra	Ryu Seung-ju	Back To Me (그대 내게 다시)	Lim Hyung-soon	50
Pair 2	Lines of the Palm	Jung Seung-jae	My Son	Kim Gun-mo	12
Pair 2	Rational Mind	Shin Yu-mi	Blue Rain	Fin.K.L	87
Round 3
Finalists	Shin Ae-ra	Ryu Seung-ju	Marron Doll (마론 인형)	Jaurim	27
Finalists	Rational Mind	Shin Yu-mi	Snail (달팽이)	Panic	72
Final
Battle	Rational Mind	Shin Yu-mi	Previous three songs were used as voting standard		21
Battle	Voice Gifted From The Gods	Seomoon Tak	My Way	MC the Max	78

=== 189th Generation Mask King ===
- Contestants: Yoon of (STAYC), Kim Hye-young, Ahn So-young, Wonstein, Hwang Hyun-hee, Kwak Chang-sun, Jung Hyuk, Lee Jae-won of (H.O.T.)
Episode 382 - 383

Episode 382

Episode 382 was broadcast on December 4, 2022, skipping a week due to streaming the 2022 FIFA World Cup.

Order	Stage Name	Real Name	Song	Original artist	Vote
Round 1
Pair 1	Meat Noodles	Yoon of STAYC	Jubilance (환희)	Jung Su-ra	65
Pair 1	Pyongyang Cold Noodles	Kim Hye-young	Jubilance (환희)	Jung Su-ra	34
2nd song	Pyongyang Cold Noodles	Kim Hye-young	Twilight (초혼)	Jang Yoon-jeong	-
Pair 2	Morning Cleansing	Ahn So-young	Meeting You By Chance (어쩌다 마주친 그대)	Songgolmae	36
Pair 2	Goodnight Kiss	Wonstein	Meeting You By Chance (어쩌다 마주친 그대)	Songgolmae	63
2nd song	Morning Cleansing	Ahn So-young	A Flower Not Fully Bloomed (못다핀 꽃 한송이)	Kim Soo-chul	-
Pair 3	Defensive Kim Min-jae	Hwang Hyun-hee	Love and Friendship (사랑과 우정사이)	Pinocchio (피노키오)	23
Pair 3	Shooting Son Heung-min	Kwak Chang-sun	Love and Friendship (사랑과 우정사이)	Pinocchio (피노키오)	76
2nd song	Defensive Kim Min-jae	Hwang Hyun-hee	Jealousy (질투)	Yu Seung-beom	-
Pair 4	Red Card	Jung Hyuk	Soulmates (천생연분)	Solid	49
Pair 4	Red Carpet	Lee Jae-won of H.O.T.	Soulmates (천생연분)	Solid	50
2nd song	Red Card	Jung Hyuk	Funny Rock	Buzz	-

Episode 383

Episode 383 was broadcast on December 11, 2022.

Order	Stage Name	Real Name	Song	Original artist	Vote
Round 2
Pair 1	Meat Noodles	Yoon of STAYC	8282	Davichi	21
Pair 1	Goodnight Kiss	Wonstein	A Song (노래)	Zion.T	78
Pair 2	Shooting Son Heung-min	Kwak Chang-sun	Sadness (애수)	Lee Moon-sae	66
Pair 2	Red Carpet	Lee Jae-won of H.O.T.	White Winter (하얀 겨울)	Mr. Two	33
Special	Red Carpet	Lee Jae-won of H.O.T.	I Loved You, Including The Pain of Breaking Up With You (그 아픔까지 사랑한 거야)	Cho Jung-hyun	-
Round 3
Finalists	Goodnight Kiss	Wonstein	Wound That Cuts Deeper Than Love (사랑보다 깊은 상처)	Yim Jae-beom & Lena Park	29
Finalists	Shooting Son Heung-min	Kwak Chang-sun	My Kind Of Sadness (나만의 슬픔)	Kim Don-kyu	70
Final
Battle	Shooting Son Heung-min	Kwak Chang-sun	Previous three songs were used as voting standard		19
Battle	Voice Gifted From The Gods	Seomoon Tak	Life (생애)	Sunwoo Jung-a	80

=== 190th Generation Mask King ===
- Contestants: Choi Sang-yeop (Lucy), Hong Shin-ae, Jaeyun (TO1), Miryo (Brown Eyed Girls), Lee Young-yoo, Kim Won-hoon, Kim Hyung-il, Lim Han-byul
Episode 384 - 385

Episode 384

Episode 384 was broadcast on December 18, 2022.

Order	Stage Name	Real Name	Song	Original artist	Vote
Round 1
Pair 1	Hot Chocolate	Choi Sang-yeop of Lucy	That Was You (그건 너)	Lee Jang-hee	76
Pair 1	Vin Chaud	Hong Shin-ae	That Was You (그건 너)	Lee Jang-hee	23
2nd song	Vin Chaud	Hong Shin-ae	Wind, Please Stop (바람아, 멈추어다오)	Lee Ji-yeon	-
Pair 2	Handsome Match Boy	Jaeyoon of TO1	My Lips Like A Warm Cup Of Coffee (내 입술 따뜻한 커피처럼)	S#arp	59
Pair 2	Rich Santa	Miryo of Brown Eyed Girls	My Lips Like A Warm Cup Of Coffee (내 입술 따뜻한 커피처럼)	S#arp	40
2nd song	Rich Santa	Miryo of Brown Eyed Girls	Next Level	æspa	-
Pair 3	Gloves	Lee Young-yoo	Happy Together	Park Ji-hun & Kang Min-kyung	65
Pair 3	A God-given Scarf	Kim Won-hoon	Happy Together	Park Ji-hun & Kang Min-kyung	34
2nd song	A God-given Scarf	Kim Won-hoon	Confession (고백)	Lee Su-hoon	-
Pair 4	Your Father's Boiler	Kim Hyung-il	Forever (평생)	UN	7
Pair 4	Briquette Of Love	Lim Han-byul	Forever (평생)	UN	92
2nd song	Your Father's Boiler	Kim Hyung-il	Gimme! Gimme!	Country Kko Kko	-

Episode 385

Episode 385 was broadcast on December 25, 2022.

Order	Stage Name	Real Name	Song	Original artist	Vote
Special	Bachelor Kimchi	Son Jin-wook	Into The Unknown	Idina Menzel	-
Round 2
Pair 1	Hot Chocolate	Choi Sang-yeop of Lucy	What I Wanted To Say (하고 싶은 말)	Kim Tae-woo	61
Pair 1	Handsome Match Boy	Jaeyoon of TO1	White Snow (흰 눈)	Eru	38
Pair 2	Gloves	Lee Young-yoo	What Do I Call You	Taeyeon	18
Pair 2	Briquette Of Love	Lim Han-byul	Miracles in December (12월의 기적)	EXO	81
Round 3
Finalists	Hot Chocolate	Choi Sang-yeop of Lucy	Said... (...라구요)	Kang San-eh	25
Finalists	Briquette Of Love	Lim Han-byul	So You Are (그래서 그대는)	Yarn	74
Final
Battle	Briquette Of Love	Lim Han-byul	Previous three songs were used as voting standard		32
Battle	Voice Gifted From The Gods	Seomoon Tak	Yes I Am (나로 말할것 같으면)	MAMAMOO	67
