= List of King of Mask Singer episodes (2023) =

South Korean variety-music show

- No. of episodes: 47

Release
- Original network: MBC
- Original release: January 8 – December 31, 2023

Season chronology
- ← Previous; 2022 Next → 2024

This is a list of episodes of the South Korean variety-music show King of Mask Singer in 2023. The show airs on MBC as part of their Sunday Night lineup. The names listed below are in performance order.

– Contestant is instantly eliminated by the live audience and judging panel
– After being eliminated, contestant performs a prepared song for the next round and takes off their mask during the instrumental break
– After being eliminated and revealing their identity, contestant has another special performance.
– Contestant advances to the next round.
– Contestant becomes the challenger.
– Mask King.

== Episodes ==
=== 191st Generation Mask King ===
- Contestants: Queen Wa$abii, Hong Sung-woo (doctor), Seo Young-ju (Nerd Connection), Seunghun (CIX), Lee Jung-min, Han Suk-joon, Lee Sung-jong (INFINITE), J-Cera
Episode 386 - 387

Episode 386

Episode 386 was broadcast on January 8, 2023, skipping a week.

Order	Stage Name	Real Name	Song	Original artist	Vote
Special	Red Mouth	Sunwoo Jung-a	ANTIFRAGILE	Le Sserafim	-
Round 1
Pair 1	Happy New Year Banner	Queen Wa$abii	Anyone There? (누구 없소?)	Han Young-ae	70
Pair 1	Golden String of the King's Birth	Hong Sung-woo	Anyone There? (누구 없소?)	Han Young-ae	29
2nd song	Golden String of the King's Birth	Hong Sung-woo	You Can Do It (넌 할수 있어)	Kang San-eh	-
Pair 2	Golden Rabbit	Seo Young-ju of Nerd Connection	Shall We Go For a Walk? (같이 걸을까?)	Lee Juck	68
Pair 2	Silver Rabbit	Seunghun of CIX	Shall We Go For a Walk? (같이 걸을까?)	Lee Juck	31
2nd song	Silver Rabbit	Seunghun of CIX	I’ll Be Waiting (기다릴게)	Ha Dong-kyun & Lee Jung	-
Pair 3	Freeze Something	Lee Jung-min	When Tomorrow Comes (내일이 찾아오면)	Oh Seok-joon, Jang Pill Soon, & Park Jung-woon	68
Pair 3	Korean-Style Meatball	Han Suk-joon	When Tomorrow Comes (내일이 찾아오면)	Oh Seok-joon, Jang Pill Soon, & Park Jung-woon	31
2nd song	Korean-Style Meatball	Han Suk-joon	I Love You (너를 사랑해)	Han Dong-joon	-
Pair 4	Disease-Free Longevity, Healthy Longevity	Lee Sung-jong of INFINITE	Goodbye (안녕)	Park Hae-kyung	20
Pair 4	Lottery Ticket	J-Cera	Goodbye (안녕)	Park Hae-kyung	79
2nd song	Disease-Free Longevity, Healthy Longevity	Lee Sung-jong of INFINITE	Eyes, Nose, Mouth (눈, 코, 입)	Taeyang	-

Episode 387

Episode 387 was broadcast on January 15, 2023.

Order	Stage Name	Real Name	Song	Original artist	Vote
Round 2
Pair 1	Happy New Year Banner	Queen Wa$abii	Piano Man	MAMAMOO	19
Pair 1	Golden Rabbit	Seo Young-ju of Nerd Connection	Don’t Say This is Goodbye (안녕이라고 말하지마)	Lee Seung-chul	80
Pair 2	Freeze Something	Lee Jung-min	I Knew We’d End Up Together (사랑하게 될줄 알았어)	Shin Hyo-beom	22
Pair 2	Lottery Ticket	J-Cera	The Emptiness of Memory (기억의 빈자리)	Naul	77
Round 3
Finalists	Golden Rabbit	Seo Young-ju of Nerd Connection	Even If The World Deceives You (세상이 그대를 속일지라도)	Kim Jang-hoon	34
Finalists	Lottery Ticket	J-Cera	The Lonely Bloom Stands Alone (시든 꽃에 물을 주듯)	HYNN	65
Final
Battle	Lottery Ticket	J-Cera	Previous three songs were used as voting standard		16
Battle	Voice Gifted From The Gods	Seomoon Tak	Older Brother (형)	Norazo	83

=== 192nd Generation Mask King ===
- Contestants: Soyeon of (Laboum), Poongja, Kim Sang-su, Woody, Hong Isaac, Mija, Lee Tae-hyun, Moon Hee-ok
Episode 388 - 389

Episode 388

Episode 388 was broadcast on January 22, 2023.

Order	Stage Name	Real Name	Song	Original artist	Vote
Special	Prince of Tree Frog	Kwon Jung-yeol of 10cm	Event Horizon (사건의 지평선)	Younha	-
Round 1
Pair 1	Out Of This World	Soyeon of Laboum	An Unexplainable Reason (이유같지 않은 이유)	Park Mi-kyung	80
Pair 1	Max Level	Poongja	An Unexplainable Reason (이유같지 않은 이유)	Park Mi-kyung	19
2nd song	Max Level	Poongja	Brown Memories (갈색추억)	Han Hye-jin	-
Pair 2	Ice Skating Shoes	Kim Sang-su	For You (너를 위해)	Yim Jae-beom	21
Pair 2	Ice Skating Rink	Woody	For You (너를 위해)	Yim Jae-beom	78
2nd song	Ice Skating Shoes	Kim Sang-su	Myeongdong Calling (명동콜링)	Crying Nut	-
Pair 3	Possibly Masked King? Dumpling	Hong Isaac	I Have A Girl (난 여자가 있는데)	J. Y. Park	79
Pair 3	Emotion, That Japchae	Mija	I Have A Girl (난 여자가 있는데)	J. Y. Park	20
2nd song	Emotion, That Japchae	Mija	Invitation (초대)	Uhm Jung-hwa	-
Pair 4	Brother-In-Law With High Standards	Lee Tae-hyun	Wishful Thinking (희망 사항)	Byun Jin-sub	12
Pair 4	Sister-In-Law With High Self-Esteem	Moon Hee-ok	Wishful Thinking (희망 사항)	Byun Jin-sub	87
2nd song	Brother-In-Law With High Standards	Lee Tae-hyun	Nest (둥지)	Nam Jin	-

Episode 389

Episode 389 was broadcast on January 29, 2023.

Order	Stage Name	Real Name	Song	Original artist	Vote
Round 2
Pair 1	Out Of This World	Soyeon of Laboum	Only One	BoA	42
Pair 1	Ice Skating Rink	Woody	In The Alleyway (거리에서)	Zoo	57
Pair 2	Possibly Masked King? Dumpling	Hong Isaac	In Dreams (꿈에)	Lena Park	38
Pair 2	Sister-In-Law With High Self-Esteem	Moon Hee-ok	Hymn of Wishes (비나리)	Sim Soo-bong	61
Round 3
Finalists	Ice Skating Rink	Woody	Can’t We (…안 되나요…)	Wheesung	54
Finalists	Sister-In-Law With High Self-Esteem	Moon Hee-ok	I Have A Lover (애인 있어요)	Lee Eun-mi	45
Final
Battle	Ice Skating Rink	Woody	Previous three songs were used as voting standard		19
Battle	Voice Gifted From The Gods	Seomoon Tak	Spark (불티)	Taeyeon	80

=== 193rd Generation Mask King ===
- Contestants: Ryu Phil-lip (K4), Kim Jun-su, Huh Ji-won (Cherry Bullet), Sojung (Ladies' Code), Lee Gun-ju, Park Ga-ryung, Vata (WDBZ), Kang Heo Dal-rim
Episode 390 - 391

Episode 390

Episode 390 was broadcast on February 5, 2023.

Order	Stage Name	Real Name	Song	Original artist	Vote
Round 1
Pair 1	Whole King of Mask Singer Life	Ryu Phil-lip of K4	Whistle (휘파람)	Lee Moon-sae	49
Pair 1	Secret Double Life	Kim Jun-su	Whistle (휘파람)	Lee Moon-sae	50
2nd song	Whole King of Mask Singer Life	Ryu Phil-lip of K4	Innately (본능적으로)	Yoon Jong-shin & Swings	-
Pair 2	Bead Ice Cream	Huh Ji-won of Cherry Bullet	Let’s Meet On Friday (금요일에 만나요)	IU & Jang Yi-jeong	24
Pair 2	Crystal Ball	Sojung of Ladies' Code	Let’s Meet On Friday (금요일에 만나요)	IU & Jang Yi-jeong	75
2nd song	Bead Ice Cream	Huh Ji-won of Cherry Bullet	I Want To Meet Someone (좋은사람 있으면 소개시켜줘)	Basis	-
Pair 3	Chajeonnori	Lee Gun-ju	To An Idiot… From An Idiot (바보에게… 바보가)	Park Myung-soo	80
Pair 3	Crunching Nuts	Park Ga-ryung	To An Idiot… From An Idiot (바보에게… 바보가)	Park Myung-soo	19
2nd song	Crunching Nuts	Park Ga-ryung	To Me Again (내게 다시)	THETHE	-
Pair 4	Head of the Student Council	Vata of WDBZ	Where The Love Falls (나 항상 그대를)	Lee Sun-hee	36
Pair 4	Fly, the School President	Kang Heo Dal-rim	Where The Love Falls (나 항상 그대를)	Lee Sun-hee	63
2nd song	Head of the Student Council	Vata of WDBZ	I’ll Make Everything Alright (고칠게)	Jin Won	-

Episode 391

Episode 391 was broadcast on February 12, 2023.

Order	Stage Name	Real Name	Song	Original artist	Vote
Round 2
Pair 1	Secret Double Life	Kim Jun-su	Mom (엄마)	Insooni	16
Pair 1	Crystal Ball	Sojung of Ladies' Code	How Can I Love The Pain of Breaking Up, It is You That I Love (어떻게 이별까지 사랑하겠어, 널 사랑하는거지)	AKMU	83
Pair 2	Chajeonnori	Lee Gun-ju	A Breakup For Me (나를 위한 이별)	Kim Hye-rim	21
Pair 2	Fly, the School President	Kang Heo Dal-rim	Return (귀로)	Park Sun-zoo	78
Round 3
Finalists	Crystal Ball	Sojung of Ladies' Code	Clockwork (시계태엽)	Lim Jeong-hee	69
Finalists	Fly, the School President	Kang Heo Dal-rim	The Red Knot (홍연)	Ahn Ye-eun	30
Special	Fly, the School President	Kang Heo Dal-rim	Winter Sea (겨울바다)	Yu Young-seok	-
Final
Battle	Crystal Ball	Sojung of Ladies' Code	Previous three songs were used as voting standard		24
Battle	Voice Gifted From The Gods	Seomoon Tak	A Thousand Years of Love (천년의 사랑)	Park Wan-kyu	75

=== 194th Generation Mask King ===
- Contestants: Kim Jae-seok (singer) (Wanted), Bae Yeon-jung, Kevin Moon (The Boyz), Yoni P, Bubbledia, Park Young-sun, Younggi, Yoo Hwe-seung (N.Flying)
Episode 392 - 393

Episode 392

Episode 392 was broadcast on February 19, 2023.

Order	Stage Name	Real Name	Song	Original artist	Vote
Round 1
Pair 1	Double-Headed Carriage	Kim Jae-seok of Wanted	Affection (애모)	Kim Soo-hee	72
Pair 1	Ssanghwool	Bae Yeon-jung	Affection (애모)	Kim Soo-hee	27
2nd song	Ssanghwool	Bae Yeon-jung	Letter (편지)	Onions	-
Pair 2	Photo Card Decorating	Kevin of The Boyz	SOLO	Jennie	85
Pair 2	Diary Decorating	Yoni P	SOLO	Jennie	14
2nd song	Diary Decorating	Yoni P	A Sexy Man (섹시한 남자)	Space A	-
Pair 3	Fearless Dog	Bubbledia	Hey, Hey, Hey	Jaurim	83
Pair 3	Fish-Baking Cat	Park Young-sun	Hey, Hey, Hey	Jaurim	16
2nd song	Fish-Baking Cat	Park Young-sun	Like The Moment You Waved Me Off While Smiling (미소를 뛰우며 나를 보낸 그 모습 처럼)	Lee Eun-ha	-
Pair 4	Money for the Championship	Younggi	Are You Crazy (미친거니)	Vibe	13
Pair 4	First Place Trophy	Yoo Hwe-seung of N.Flying	Are You Crazy (미친거니)	Vibe	86
2nd song	Money for the Championship	Younggi	Walking To The Sky (걸어서 하늘까지)	Jang Hyun-chul	-

Episode 393

Episode 393 was broadcast on February 26, 2023.

Order	Stage Name	Real Name	Song	Original artist	Vote
Round 2
Pair 1	Double-Headed Carriage	Kim Jae-seok of Wanted	You In My Faded Memories (흐린 기억 속의 그대)	Hyun Jin-young	51
Pair 1	Photo Card Decorating	Kevin of The Boyz	Rush Hour	Crush	48
Pair 2	Fearless Dog	Bubbledia	Marry Me	Yangpa	21
Pair 2	First Place Trophy	Yoo Hwe-seung of N.Flying	My Sea (아이와 나의 바다)	IU	78
Special	Fearless Dog	Bubbledia	I Believe	Lee Soo-young	-
Round 3
Finalists	Double-Headed Carriage	Kim Jae-seok of Wanted	Gathering My Tears (내 눈물 모아)	Seo Ji-won	19
Finalists	First Place Trophy	Yoo Hwe-seung of N.Flying	Rhapsody of the Rain (비의 Rhapsody)	Choi Jae-hoon	80
Final
Battle	First Place Trophy	Yoo Hwe-seung of N.Flying	Previous three songs were used as voting standard		51
Battle	Voice Gifted From The Gods	Seomoon Tak	Missing You, Missing You (그리워 그리워)	Noel	48

=== 195th Generation Mask King ===
- Contestants: Choi Yu-ree, Cho Yi-hyun, Leedo (singer) (Oneus), Jo Bok-rae, Lee Se-young, Tanaka, Choi Jung-chul, Zizo
Episode 394 - 395

Episode 394

Episode 394 was broadcast on March 5, 2023.

Order	Stage Name	Real Name	Song	Original artist	Vote
Round 1
Pair 1	My Constellation Is The KOMS Throne	Choi Yu-ree	A Good Person (좋은 사람)	Toy & Kim Hyung-jun	30
Pair 1	My Birthstone Is The KOMS Seat	Cho Yi-hyun	A Good Person (좋은 사람)	Toy & Kim Hyung-jun	69
2nd song	My Constellation Is The KOMS Throne	Choi Yu-ree	My Old Story (나의 옛날 이야기)	Cho Deok-bae	-
Pair 2	Honeybee	Leedo of Oneus	Tobacco Shop Girl (담배가게 아가씨)	Song Chang-sik	39
Pair 2	Conglomerate	Jo Bok-rae	Tobacco Shop Girl (담배가게 아가씨)	Song Chang-sik	60
2nd song	Honeybee	Leedo of Oneus	The Song That’ll Capture You (널 붙잡을 노래)	Rain	-
Pair 3	Bartender	Lee Se-young	Nagging (잔소리)	IU & Lim Seul-ong	86
Pair 3	Cocktail	Tanaka	Nagging (잔소리)	IU & Lim Seul-ong	13
2nd song	Cocktail	Tanaka	Let Me Say Goodbye	Bobby Kim	-
Pair 4	Round And Round	Choi Jung-chul	Break Me Down (소리쳐봐)	Hyun Jin-young	51
Pair 4	Yeah, I’m Single	Zizo	Break Me Down (소리쳐봐)	Hyun Jin-young	48
2nd song	Yeah, I’m Single	Zizo	Octopus’ Dream (문어의 꿈)	Ahn Ye-eun	-

Episode 395

Episode 395 was broadcast on March 12, 2023.

Order	Stage Name	Real Name	Song	Original artist	Vote
Round 2
Pair 1	My Birthstone Is The KOMS Seat	Cho Yi-hyun	Because I’m A Girl (여자이니까)	Kiss	67
Pair 1	Conglomerate	Jo Bok-rae	Always By Your Side (언제나 너의 곁에서)	Lim Ha-young	32
Pair 2	Bartender	Lee Se-young	A Start (시작)	Park Ki-young	15
Pair 2	Round And Round	Choi Jung-chul	Mother (엄마)	Ra.D	84
Round 3
Finalists	My Birthstone Is The KOMS Seat	Cho Yi-hyun	You Are My Everything	Gummy	16
Finalists	Round And Round	Choi Jung-chul	One Love	M.C The MAX	83
Final
Battle	Round And Round	Choi Jung-chul	Previous three songs were used as voting standard		18
Battle	First Place Trophy	Yoo Hwe-seung of N.Flying	Love Again (다시 사랑한다면)	Do Won-kyung	81

=== 196th Generation Mask King ===
- Contestants: Ren (NU'EST), Yeo Hyun-soo, Shim Ha-eun, Raina, Sseubokman, Yang Joon-hyuk, Zelo (B.A.P), Shin Ji-hu (Postman)
Episode 396 - 397

Episode 396

Episode 396 was broadcast on March 19, 2023.

Order	Stage Name	Real Name	Song	Original artist	Vote
Round 1
Pair 1	Disco Tagada	Ren of NU’EST	Like The Strong Salmon That Swim Upstream (거꾸로 강을 거슬러 오르는 저 힘찬 연어들 처럼)	Kang San-eh	84
Pair 1	Bungee Jumping	Yeo Hyun-soo	Like The Strong Salmon That Swim Upstream (거꾸로 강을 거슬러 오르는 저 힘찬 연어들 처럼)	Kang San-eh	15
2nd song	Bungee Jumping	Yeo Hyun-soo	Tears	Lee Byung-hun	-
Pair 2	Baby Carriage	Shim Ha-eun	I’m Your Girl	S.E.S.	20
Pair 2	Flower Carriage	Raina	I’m Your Girl	S.E.S.	79
2nd song	Baby Carriage	Shim Ha-eun	We Loved Each Other (사랑했잖아)	Lyn	-
Pair 3	Extraordinary Meal	Sseubokman	Couple (커플)	Sechs Kies	78
Pair 3	Extraordinarily Tall	Yang Joon-hyuk	Couple (커플)	Sechs Kies	21
2nd song	Extraordinarily Tall	Yang Joon-hyuk	My Love By My Side (내 사랑 내 곁애)	Kim Hyun-sik	-
Pair 4	Pohang Hand of Shake Statue	Zelo of B.A.P	Come To Me (와줘)	Se7en	25
Pair 4	Ulsan Post Office of Zeal	Shin Ji-hu of Postman	Come To Me (와줘)	Se7en	74
2nd song	Pohang Hand of Shake Statue	Zelo of B.A.P	You Asleep? (자니)	Primary feat. Dynamic Duo	-

Episode 397

Episode 397 was broadcast on March 26, 2023.

Order	Stage Name	Real Name	Song	Original artist	Vote
Round 2
Pair 1	Disco Tagada	Ren of NU’EST	Thorn (가시)	Buzz	37
Pair 1	Flower Carriage	Raina	The Fact That I Lived Amongst You For A Bit (내가 너의 곁에 잠시 살았다는 걸)	Toy	62
Pair 2	Extraordinary Meal	Sseubokman	Four Seasons (사계)	Taeyeon	17
Pair 2	Ulsan Post Office of Zeal	Shin Ji-hu of Postman	Timeless	SG Wannabe	82
Round 3
Finalists	Flower Carriage	Raina	Rainy Season (장마)	Jungin	27
Finalists	Ulsan Post Office of Zeal	Shin Ji-hu of Postman	Confession (고백)	4Men	72
Final
Battle	Ulsan Post Office of Zeal	Shin Ji-hu of Postman	Previous three songs were used as voting standard		22
Battle	First Place Trophy	Yoo Hwe-seung of N.Flying	Horangsuwolga (호랑수월가)	Narae	77

=== 197th Generation Mask King ===
- Contestants: Seo Ji-eum, Woobin (Cravity), Go Jeong-woo, Horan (Clazziquai), Kwon Seo-kyoung (Hpresso), Jung Ho-young, Aiki, Mihawk Back
Episode 398 - 399

Episode 398

Episode 398 was broadcast on April 2, 2023.

Order	Stage Name	Real Name	Song	Original artist	Vote
Round 1
Pair 1	Hit Girl	Seo Ji-eum	Secret Garden (비밀정원)	OH MY GIRL	22
Pair 1	Green Onion Boy	Woobin of Cravity	Secret Garden (비밀정원)	OH MY GIRL	77
2nd song	Hit Girl	Seo Ji-eum	17171771	Jaurim	-
Pair 2	Classic Otter	Go Jeong-woo	Where The Wind Comes From (바람이 불어오는 곳)	Kim Kwang-seok	44
Pair 2	Funky Fox	Horan of Clazziquai	Where The Wind Comes From (바람이 불어오는 곳)	Kim Kwang-seok	55
2nd song	Classic Otter	Go Jeong-woo	Please Love Her (그녀를 사랑해줘요)	Ha Dong-kyun	-
Pair 3	Swing Ride	Kwon Seo-kyoung of Hpresso	Sparks (불티)	Jeon Young-rok	84
Pair 3	Rotating Sushi	Jung Ho-young	Sparks (불티)	Jeon Young-rok	15
2nd song	Rotating Sushi	Jung Ho-young	White Wind (하얀 바람)	Sobangcha	-
Pair 4	It’s Rather Good	Aiki	Every day, Every Moment (모든 날, 모든 순간)	Paul Kim	42
Pair 4	Let’s Go To The Very Limit	Mihawk Back	Every day, Every Moment (모든 날, 모든 순간)	Paul Kim	57
2nd song	It's Rather Good	Aiki	Decalcomanie (데칼코마니)	MAMAMOO	-

Episode 399

Episode 399 was broadcast on April 9, 2023.

Order	Stage Name	Real Name	Song	Original artist	Vote
Round 2
Pair 1	Green Onion Boy	Woobin of Cravity	Who Are You	Sam Kim	32
Pair 1	Funky Fox	Horan of Clazziquai	Adult (어른)	Choi ye_geun Band	67
Pair 2	Swing Ride	Kwon Seo-kyoung of Hpresso	This Ain't It (이게 아닌데)	John Park	51
Pair 2	Let’s Go To The Very Limit	Mihawk Back	Every Moment of You (너의 모든 순간)	Sung Si-kyung	48
Round 3
Finalists	Funky Fox	Horan of Clazziquai	When My Loneliness Calls To You (나의 외로움이 널 부를 때)	Jang Pill Soon	53
Finalists	Swing Ride	Kwon Seo-kyoung of Hpresso	I Guess So (그런가봐요)	V One	46
Special	Swing Ride	Kwon Seo-kyoung of Hpresso	My Way	Frank Sinatra	-
Final
Battle	Funky Fox	Horan of Clazziquai	Previous three songs were used as voting standard		10
Battle	First Place Trophy	Yoo Hwe-seung of N.Flying	Oort Cloud (오르트구름)	Younha	89

=== 198th Generation Mask King ===
- Contestants: Keum (EPEX), Umji (VIVIZ), Eun Ga-eun, Kim Soo-young, Cho Yeon-ho, Yoon Tae-woong, Cao Lu (Fiestar), Lim Jeong-hee
Episode 400 - 401

Episode 400

Episode 400 was broadcast on April 16, 2023.

Order	Stage Name	Real Name	Song	Original artist	Vote
Special Event	8282	Kim Gu-ra	Through The Hidden Time (가려진 시간 사이로)	Yoon Sang	10
Special Event	8585	Kim Sung-joo	Through The Hidden Time (가려진 시간 사이로)	Yoon Sang	89
Round 1
Pair 1	Beautiful Young Life	Keum of EPEX	Two People (두 사람)	Sung Si-kyung	24
Pair 1	Palette	Umji of VIVIZ	Two People (두 사람)	Sung Si-kyung	75
2nd song	Beautiful Young Life	Keum of EPEX	My Type (취향저격)	iKON	-
Pair 2	Fall 7 Times Get Up 8 Times	Eun Ga-eun	Unpredictable Life (알 수 없는 인생)	Lee Moon-sae	90
Pair 2	Eight Treasure Vegetables	Kim Soo-young	Unpredictable Life (알 수 없는 인생)	Lee Moon-sae	9
2nd song	Eight Treasure Vegetables	Kim Soo-young	Napal Baji (나팔바지)	PSY	-
Pair 3	Eight Gallant Men	Cho Yeon-ho	Bravo, My Life!	Bom Yeoreum Gaeul Kyeoul	60
Pair 3	Eight School Districts of Gangnam	Yoon Tae-woong	Bravo, My Life!	Bom Yeoreum Gaeul Kyeoul	39
2nd song	Eight School Districts of Gangnam	Yoon Tae-woong	Superstar (슈퍼스타)	Lee Han-chul	-
Pair 4	Beauty In All Eight Directions	Cao Lu of Fiestar	Beautiful Days (아름다운 날들)	Jang Hye-jin	16
Pair 4	Fairy Pitta	Lim Jeong-hee	Beautiful Days (아름다운 날들)	Jang Hye-jin	83
2nd song	Beauty In All Eight Directions	Cao Lu of Fiestar	If (만약에)	Taeyeon	-

Episode 401

Episode 401 was broadcast on April 23, 2023.

Order	Stage Name	Real Name	Song	Original artist	Vote
Special	Voice Gifted From The Gods	Seomoon Tak	Always Remember Us This Way	Lady Gaga	-
Round 2
Pair 1	Palette	Umji of VIVIZ	Something’s Wrong (뭔가 잘못됐어)	Kwon Jin-ah	14
Pair 1	Fall 7 Times Get Up 8 Times	Eun Ga-eun	Fox Rain (여우비)	Lee Sun-hee	85
Pair 2	Eight Gallant Men	Cho Yeon-ho	I Was Happy… Goodbye (행복했다… 안녕)	Kim Yeon-woo	24
Pair 2	Fairy Pitta	Lim Jeong-hee	Where Are We Now	MAMAMOO	75
Round 3
Finalists	Fall 7 Times Get Up 8 Times	Eun Ga-eun	I Love You (난 널 사랑해)	Shin Hyo-beom	40
Finalists	Fairy Pitta	Lim Jeong-hee	Wildflower (야생화)	Park Hyo-shin	59
Final
Battle	Fairy Pitta	Lim Jeong-hee	Previous three songs were used as voting standard		54
Battle	First Place Trophy	Yoo Hwe-seung of N.Flying	In Full Bloom (만개)	Kim Ho-joong (prod. by Shin Ji-hu)	45

=== 199th Generation Mask King ===
- Contestants: Hwiseo (H1-KEY), Dex, Sungmin, Kim Ki-hyuk, Rich (Eagle Five), Youn Sung-ho, Kim Hyung-tae (Busker Busker), Bae Da-hae
Episode 402 - 403

Episode 402

Episode 402 was broadcast on April 30, 2023.

Order	Stage Name	Real Name	Song	Original artist	Vote
Round 1
Pair 1	Picnic	Hwiseo of H1-KEY	Late Regret (늦은 후회)	Kang Sung-yeon	75
Pair 1	Barbeque	Dex	Late Regret (늦은 후회)	Kang Sung-yeon	24
2nd song	Barbeque	Dex	Already Sad Love (이미 슬픈 사랑)	Yada	-
Pair 2	Rockstar	Sungmin	Eternity (영원)	Choi Jin-young	51
Pair 2	Monster	Kim Ki-hyuk	Eternity (영원)	Choi Jin-young	48
2nd song	Monster	Kim Ki-hyuk	The North Star (북극성)	Kangta	-
Pair 3	Cafe Mocha	Rich of Eagle Five	You Are My Destiny (너는 내 운명)	Haha	56
Pair 3	Cotton	Youn Sung-ho	You Are My Destiny (너는 내 운명)	Haha	43
2nd song	Cotton	Youn Sung-ho	Stand Up (일어나)	Kim Kwang-seok	-
Pair 4	Day Of An Unemployed Person	Kim Hyung-tae of Busker Busker	Dream	Bae Suzy & Baekhyun	44
Pair 4	Swan Lake	Bae Da-hae	Dream	Bae Suzy & Baekhyun	55
2nd song	Day Of An Unemployed Person	Kim Hyung-tae of Busker Busker	A Song That Hasn’t Ended (끝나지 않은 노래)	No Reply	-

Episode 403

Episode 403 was broadcast on May 7, 2023.

Order	Stage Name	Real Name	Song	Original artist	Vote
Round 2
Pair 1	Picnic	Hwiseo of H1-KEY	Into The New World (다시 만난 세계)	Girls’ Generation	17
Pair 1	Rockstar	Sungmin	Love Has Gone (사랑했지만)	Kim Kwang-seok	82
Pair 2	Cafe Mocha	Rich of Eagle Five	Before Sadness Comes (슬퍼지려 하기 전에)	Choi Sun-won	36
Pair 2	Swan Lake	Bae Da-hae	Into My Arms (그대 내 품에)	Yoo Jae-ha	63
Special	Cafe Mocha	Rich of Eagle Five	Only The Words: I Love You (사랑해 이말밖엔)	Rich	-
Round 3
Finalists	Rockstar	Sungmin	Please No (안돼요 안돼)	Kim Sang-bae	22
Finalists	Swan Lake	Bae Da-hae	If I Leave (나 가거든)	Sumi Jo	77
Final
Battle	Swan Lake	Bae Da-hae	Previous three songs were used as voting standard		31
Battle	Fairy Pitta	Lim Jeong-hee	Dear Name (이름에게)	IU	68

=== 200th Generation Mask King ===
- Contestants: Jeong Min-chan, Jeong Dong-hwan (MeloMance), Choi Ki-hwan, Lim Yoon-sung (CNEMA), Jeong Soo-yeon, Yoo Hye-ri, Jeong Ji-woong, Suran
Episode 404 - 405

Episode 404

Episode 404 was broadcast on May 14, 2023.

Order	Stage Name	Real Name	Song	Original artist	Vote
Round 1
Pair 1	Filial Son	Jeong Min-chan	Chocolate Drive	Moida Band	59
Pair 1	Apprentice	Jeong Dong-hwan of MeloMance	Chocolate Drive	Moida Band	40
2nd song	Apprentice	Jeong Dong-hwan of MeloMance	Returning Home (귀향)	Kim Dong-ryul	-
Pair 2	Home Theater	Choi Ki-hwan	Prologue (서시)	Yoon Hyung-ju	11
Pair 2	Movie Room	Lim Yoon-sung of CNEMA	Prologue (서시)	Yoon Hyung-ju	88
2nd song	Home Theater	Choi Ki-hwan	Prince of the Sea (바다의 왕자)	Park Myung-soo	-
Pair 3	Wreath	Jeong Soo-yeon	Love is Like the Raindrops On the Window (사랑은 창 밖에 빗물 같아요)	Yang Soo-kyung	76
Pair 3	Crown	Yoo Hye-ri	Love is Like the Raindrops On the Window (사랑은 창 밖에 빗물 같아요)	Yang Soo-kyung	23
2nd song	Crown	Yoo Hye-ri	I’ll Give You All My Love (내게 남은 사랑을 드릴게요)	Jang Hye-lee	-
Pair 4	Pork Cutlet	Jeong Ji-woong	Freeway Romance (고속도로 Romance)	Yoon Jong-shin	30
Pair 4	Spicy Rice Cake	Suran	Freeway Romance (고속도로 Romance)	Yoon Jong-shin	69
2nd song	Pork Cutlet	Jeong Ji-woong	Guilty (죽일놈)	Dynamic Duo	-

Episode 405

Episode 405 was broadcast on May 21, 2023.

Order	Stage Name	Real Name	Song	Original artist	Vote
Round 2
Pair 1	Filial Son	Jeong Min-chan	I Loved Even That Pain (그 아픔까지 사랑한거야)	Cho Jung-hyun	42
Pair 1	Movie Room	Lim Yoon-sung of CNEMA	Through The Night (밤편지)	IU	57
Pair 2	Wreath	Jeong Soo-yeon	Storm	Rumors	51
Pair 2	Spicy Rice Cake	Suran	ONLY	Lee Hi	48
Special	Spice Rice Cake	Suran	Fine	Taeyeon	-
Round 3
Finalists	Movie Room	Lim Yoon-sung of CNEMA	Nocturne (야상곡)	Kim Yoon-ah	22
Finalists	Wreath	Jeong Soo-yeon	I Can’t Help But Say Goodbye (보낼 수밖에 없는 난)	So Chan-whee	77
Final
Battle	Wreath	Jeong Soo-yeon	Previous three songs were used as voting standard		17
Battle	Fairy Pitta	Lim Jeong-hee	The Gold Star (황금별)	Mozart! OST	82

=== 201st Generation Mask King ===
- Contestants: Jisook (Rainbow), Shin Soo-ji, Juho, Lee Ji-an, Kim Da-hyun, Ahn Yong-joon, Jeong Keun-woo, Jin Min-ho
Episode 406 - 407

Episode 406

Episode 406 was broadcast on May 28, 2023.

Order	Stage Name	Real Name	Song	Original artist	Vote
Round 1
Pair 1	Cable Car	Jisook of Rainbow	Running (달리기)	Nodance	77
Pair 1	Cruise Ship	Shin Soo-ji	Running (달리기)	Nodance	22
2nd song	Cruise Ship	Shin Soo-ji	Western Sky (서쪽 하늘)	Lee Seung-chul	-
Pair 2	Singing Expert	Juho	You And I, Fluttering (그대와 나, 설레임)	Acoustic Collabo & Soulman	74
Pair 2	Vocal Sharper	Lee Ji-an	You And I, Fluttering (그대와 나, 설레임)	Acoustic Collabo & Soulman	25
2nd song	Vocal Sharper	Lee Ji-an	Just One More Time (한번만더)	Park Sung-shin	-
Pair 3	The Three Bears	Kim Da-hyun	Nice To Meet You (잘 부탁드립니다)	Ex	81
Pair 3	Awesome Red Tomato	Ahn Yong-joon	Nice To Meet You (잘 부탁드립니다)	Ex	18
2nd song	Awesome Red Tomato	Ahn Yong-joon	Crying	Flower	-
Pair 4	Yakgwa Should Be The King	Jeong Keun-woo	Smile of Rose (장미의 미소)	Shin In-soo	10
Pair 4	Dried Persimmon To The Throne	Jin Min-ho	Smile of Rose (장미의 미소)	Shin In-soo	89
2nd song	Yakgwa Should Be The King	Jeong Keun-woo	Pebble (돌멩이)	Mashidda Band	-

Episode 407

Episode 407 was broadcast on June 4, 2023.

Order	Stage Name	Real Name	Song	Original artist	Vote
Round 2
Pair 1	Cable Car	Jisook of Rainbow	Comet (혜성)	Younha	24
Pair 1	Singing Expert	Juho	365 Days (365일)	ALi	75
Pair 2	The Three Bears	Kim Da-hyun	To J (J에게)	Lee Sun-hee	35
Pair 2	Dried Persimmon To The Throne	Jin Min-ho	Piano (피아노)	Jo Sung-mo	64
Round 3
Finalists	Singing Expert	Juho	Break Away	Big Mama	22
Finalists	Dried Persimmon To The Throne	Jin Min-ho	For A Thousand Days (천일동안)	Lee Seung-chul	77
Final
Battle	Dried Persimmon To The Throne	Jin Min-ho	Previous three songs were used as voting standard		41
Battle	Fairy Pitta	Lim Jeong-hee	If It Is You (너였다면)	Jung Seung-hwan	58

=== 202nd Generation Mask King ===
- Contestants: Son Dong-pyo (MIRAE), Seungmin (Stray Kids), Heo Hye-jin, Oh Seung-won, Kim Hong-pyo, Mose, Bab Gub-nam, Kim Mi-ryeo
Episode 408 - 409

Episode 408

Episode 408 was broadcast on June 11, 2023.

Order	Stage Name	Real Name	Song	Original artist	Vote
Round 1
Pair 1	Fountain Pen	Son Dong-pyo of MIRAE	Pado (파도)	UN	41
Pair 1	Ink	Seungmin of Stray Kids	Pado (파도)	UN	58
2nd song	Fountain Pen	Son Dong-pyo of MIRAE	Phonecert (폰서트)	10cm	-
Pair 2	No Way You’ll Be Left Alone	Heo Hye-jin	Fate (인연)	Lee Sun-hee	75
Pair 2	If Goodwill Continues	Oh Seung-won	Fate (인연)	Lee Sun-hee	24
2nd song	If Goodwill Continues	Oh Seung-won	In Dreams (꿈에)	Cho Deok-bae	-
Special	If Goodwill Continues	Oh Seung-won	Dooly the Little Dinosaur Theme Song	Oh Seung-won	-
Pair 3	Folded Egg	Kim Hong-pyo	About Romance (낭만에 대하여)	Choi Baek-ho	17
Pair 3	Fried Egg	Mose	About Romance (낭만에 대하여)	Choi Baek-ho	82
2nd song	Folded Egg	Kim Hong-pyo	Someone’s Dream (어떤이의 꿈)	Bom Yeoreum Gaeul Kyeoul	-
Pair 4	Very Friendly Owner	babgubnam	Tarzan (타잔)	Yoon Do-hyun	21
Pair 4	Older Sister Good At Reggae	Kim Mi-ryeo	Tarzan (타잔)	Yoon Do-hyun	78
2nd song	Very Friendly Owner	babgubnam	Spring Days Of My Life (내 생에 봄날은)	Can	-

Episode 409

Episode 409 was broadcast on June 18, 2023.

Order	Stage Name	Real Name	Song	Original artist	Vote
Round 2
Pair 1	Ink	Seungmin of Stray Kids	Laundry (빨래)	Lee Juck	28
Pair 1	No Way You’ll Be Left Alone	Heo Hye-jin	Heaven	Ailee	71
Pair 2	Fried Egg	Mose	I Hate You (미워요)	Jungin	75
Pair 2	Older Sister Good At Reggae	Kim Mi-ryeo	As Time Goes By (시간이 흐른 뒤)	Yoon Mi-rae	24
Round 3
Finalists	No Way You’ll Be Left Alone	Heo Hye-jin	My Destiny	Lyn	44
Finalists	Fried Egg	Mose	Amazing You (그대라는 사치)	Han Dong-geun	55
Final
Battle	Fried Egg	Mose	Previous three songs were used as voting standard		13
Battle	Fairy Pitta	Lim Jeong-hee	Go Away	2NE1	86
Special	Fried Egg	Mose	It’s Love (사랑인걸)	Mose	-

=== 203rd Generation Mask King ===
- Contestants: Bily Acoustie, Gyeongseo (GyeongseoYeji), Kim Min-hee, Yun Seong, Cha Woong-ki (TO1), Gaho, Subin (Dal Shabet), Bae Ki-sung (Can)
Episode 410 - 411

Episode 410

Episode 410 was broadcast on June 25, 2023.

Order	Stage Name	Real Name	Song	Original artist	Vote
Round 1
Pair 1	Marry Me	Bily Acoustie	Slightly Tipsy (취길을 빌려)	Saevom	61
Pair 1	Kiss Me	Gyeongseo of GyeongseoYeji	Slightly Tipsy (취길을 빌려)	Saevom	38
2nd song	Kiss Me	Gyeongseo of GyeongseoYeji	The Woman (그 여자)	Baek Ji-young	-
Pair 2	Cereal	Kim Min-hee	Magic Carpet Ride (매직 카펫 라이드)	Jaurim	20
Pair 2	Yogurt	Yun Seong	Magic Carpet Ride (매직 카펫 라이드)	Jaurim	79
2nd song	Cereal	Kim Min-hee	Rainwater (빗물)	Chae Eun-ok	-
Pair 3	Acting Cute	Cha Woong-ki of TO1	HUG	TVXQ	16
Pair 3	Great Catch	Gaho	HUG	TVXQ	83
2nd song	Acting Cute	Cha Woong-ki of TO1	Hey (있잖아)	Paul Kim	-
Pair 4	Abacus	Subin of Dal Shabet	Love Love Love (사랑 사랑 사랑)	Kim Hyun-sik	42
Pair 4	Calculator	Bae Ki-sung of Can	Love Love Love (사랑 사랑 사랑)	Kim Hyun-sik	57
2nd song	Abacus	Subin of Dal Shabet	Beautiful Night (아름다운 밤)	Ulala Session	-

Episode 411

Episode 411 was broadcast on July 2, 2023.

Order	Stage Name	Real Name	Song	Original artist	Vote
Round 2
Pair 1	Marry Me	Bily Acoustie	It Would Be Good (좋을텐데)	Sung Si-kyung	30
Pair 1	Yogurt	Yun Seong	Invisible Love (보이지 않는 사랑)	Shin Seung-hun	69
Pair 2	Great Catch	Gaho	Someday, The Boy (그때 그 아인)	Kim Feel	53
Pair 2	Calculator	Bae Ki-sung of Can	It Is For You (널 위한거야)	miS mR	46
Special	Calculator	Bae Ki-sung of Can	Spring Days of my Life (내생에 봄날은)	Can	-
Round 3
Finalists	Yogurt	Yun Seong	Aria of the Sad Soul (Elize) (슬픈 영혼의 아리아 (엘리제))	Kim Kyung-ho	59
Finalists	Great Catch	Gaho	Come Back To Me (다시 와주라)	Vibe	40
Final
Battle	Yogurt	Yun Seong	Previous three songs were used as voting standard		41
Battle	Fairy Pitta	Lim Jeong-hee	Singing Got Better (노래가 늘었어)	Ailee	58

=== 204th Generation Mask King ===
- Contestants: Haram (Billlie singer) (Billlie), Hanbin (4Men singer) (4Men), Zhou Mi (Super Junior-M), Jadu, Park Hye-shin, Lim La-ra, Kim Seong-wook, Kim Jong-seo
Episode 412 - 413

Episode 412

Episode 412 was broadcast on July 9, 2023.

Order	Stage Name	Real Name	Song	Original artist	Vote
Round 1
Pair 1	Rubber Basin Red	Haram of Billlie	The Downfall of Moon (달의 몰락)	Kim Hyeon-cheol	48
Pair 1	Delivery Truck Blue	Hanbin of 4Men	The Downfall of Moon (달의 몰락)	Kim Hyeon-cheol	51
2nd song	Rubber Basin Red	Haram of Billlie	마리아 (Maria)	Hwasa	-
Pair 2	Fish Bowl	Zhou Mi of Super Junior-M	Don’t Forget (잊지 말기로해)	Jang Pill Soon & Kim Hyeon-cheol	45
Pair 2	Bird Cage	Jadu	Don’t Forget (잊지 말기로해)	Jang Pill Soon & Kim Hyeon-cheol	54
2nd song	Fish Bowl	Zhou Mi of Super Junior-M	Nights Into Days (혼자서 걸어요)	Taeyeon	-
Pair 3	Pepperoni	Park Hye-shin	Honey	Park Jin-young	72
Pair 3	Red Pepper	Lim La-ra	Honey	Park Jin-young	27
2nd song	Red Pepper	Lim La-ra	Bad Girls	Lee Hyo-ri	-
Pair 4	Veteran Detective	Kim Seong-wook	Whale Hunting (고래사냥)	Song Chang-sik	15
Pair 4	Top Class Special Agent	Kim Jong-seo	Whale Hunting (고래사냥)	Song Chang-sik	84
2nd song	Veteran Detective	Kim Seong-wook	In Summer (여름 안에서)	Deux	-

Episode 413

Episode 413 was broadcast on July 23, 2023. It was originally scheduled to air on July 16, 2023.

Order	Stage Name	Real Name	Song	Original artist	Vote
Round 2
Pair 1	Delivery Truck Blue	Hanbin of 4Men	Cleaning (청소)	THERAY	56
Pair 1	Bird Cage	Jadu	Eve’s Warning (이브의 경고)	Park Mi-kyung	43
Pair 2	Pepperoni	Park Hye-shin	This Emptiness I Can’t Fill (채워지지 않는 빈자리)	Lee Sang-woo	26
Pair 2	Top Class Special Agent	Kim Jong-seo	TOMBOY	Hyukoh	73
Round 3
Finalists	Delivery Truck Blue	Hanbin of 4Men	Things I Can’t Do For You (해줄 수 없는 일)	Park Hyo-shin	27
Finalists	Top Class Special Agent	Kim Jong-seo	Secret (비밀)	Boohwal	72
Final
Battle	Top Class Special Agent	Kim Jong-seo	Previous three songs were used as voting standard		52
Battle	Fairy Pitta	Lim Jeong-hee	To You Who Don’t Love Me Anymore (나를 사랑하지 않는 그대에게)	Lee So-ra	47

=== 205th Generation Mask King ===
- Contestants: Kim Jurri, Lee Hwa-seon, Shin Yong-nam, Yoo Min-sang, Kim Tae-rae (Zerobaseone), Beige, Peakboy, Kim Min-kook
Episode 414 - 415

Episode 414

Episode 414 was broadcast on July 30, 2023. The group order for Round 1 has been shuffled in order of Pair 3, Pair 4, Pair 1, and Pair 2. This is later swapped back into the original order in Episode 415 starting from Round 2.

Order	Stage Name	Real Name	Song	Original artist	Vote
Round 1
Pair 3	Paragliding	Kim Jurri	I Really Like You (니가 참 좋아)	Jewelry	83
Pair 3	Snorkeling	Lee Hwa-seon	I Really Like You (니가 참 좋아)	Jewelry	16
2nd song	Snorkeling	Lee Hwa-seon	All Right	Lim Kim	-
Pair 4	Not Gaining Weight Into The Wild	Shin Yong-nam	Sorrow (애상)	Cool	72
Pair 4	My Golden Three Meals	Yoo Min-sang	Sorrow (애상)	Cool	27
2nd song	My Golden Three Meals	Yoo Min-sang	Feeling Only You (너만을 느끼며)	The Blue	-
Pair 1	Snowflake Bingsu	Kim Tae-rae of ZEROBASEONE	Rain And You (비와 당신)	Park Joong-hoon	36
Pair 1	Parfait	Beige	Rain And You (비와 당신)	Park Joong-hoon	63
2nd song	Snowflake Bingsu	Kim Tae-rae of ZEROBASEONE	10 Reasons For I Love You (그대를 사랑하는 10가지 이유)	Lee Seok-hoon	-
Pair 2	Swim Cap	Peakboy	Yeosu Night Sea (여수 밤바다)	Busker Busker	52
Pair 2	Swim Fin	Kim Min-kook	Yeosu Night Sea (여수 밤바다)	Busker Busker	47
2nd song	Swim Fin	Kim Min-kook	Wi Ing Wi Ing (위잉 위잉)	Hyukoh	-

Episode 415

Episode 415 was broadcast on August 6, 2023.

Order	Stage Name	Real Name	Song	Original artist	Vote
Special	Ssaksseureo (싹쓰러)	Lim Han-byul & Wetboy & Zizo	Dance with DOC	DJ D.O.C.	-
Round 2
Pair 1	Parfait	Beige	Lemon Tree	Park Hye-kyung	72
Pair 1	Swim Cap	Peakboy	Nothing Better	Brown Eyed Soul	27
Pair 2	Paragliding	Kim Jurri	I Will Be a Bird And Fly (새가 되어 날으리)	Songgolmae	48
Pair 2	Not Gaining Weight Into The Wild	Shin Yong-nam	Love… That Guy (사랑… 그 놈)	Bobby Kim	51
Special	Paragliding	Kim Jurri	Shimcheongga	Traditional Korean Folk Music	-
Round 3
Finalists	Parfait	Beige	Confession (고백)	Jang Na-ra	32
Finalists	Not Gaining Weight Into The Wild	Shin Yong-nam	After Having Loved (사랑한 후에)	Shin Sung-woo	67
Final
Battle	Not Gaining Weight Into The Wild	Shin Yong-nam	Previous three songs were used as voting standard		32
Battle	Top Class Special Agent	Kim Jong-seo	From Mark	Ha Dong-kyun	67

=== 206th Generation Mask King ===
- Contestants: Kim Dae-ho, Yoo Hae-joon, Lia (ITZY), KNUCKS (Prime Kingz), Ryu Ji-hyun, Moon Hee-kyung, Ham Chun-ho, Ahn Ye-eun
Episode 416 - 417

Episode 416

Episode 416 was broadcast on August 13, 2023.

Order	Stage Name	Real Name	Song	Original artist	Vote
Round 1
Pair 1	Caravan	Kim Dae-ho	A Farewell To Arms (무기여 잘 있거라)	Park Sang-min	21
Pair 1	Luxury Camping	Yoo Hae-joon	A Farewell To Arms (무기여 잘 있거라)	Park Sang-min	78
2nd song	Caravan	Kim Dae-Ho	Oh! What A Shiny Night (밤이 깊었네)	Crying Nut	-
Pair 2	Aloha	Lia of ITZY	It’s Love (사랑인걸)	Mose	88
Pair 2	Aloe	KNUCKS of Prime Kingz	It’s Love (사랑인걸)	Mose	11
2nd song	Aloe	KNUCKS of Prime Kingz	How to Avoid the Sun (태양을 피하는 법)	Rain	-
Pair 3	Bagel	Ryu Ji-hyun	Super Star	Jewelry	42
Pair 3	Macaron	Moon Hee-kyung	Super Star	Jewelry	57
2nd song	Bagel	Ryu Ji-hyun	WA-R-R (와르르)	Colde	-
Pair 4	City View	Ham Chun-ho	People Are More Beautiful Than Flowers (사람이 꽃보다 아름다워)	An Chi-hwan	35
Pair 4	Ocean View	Ahn Ye-eun	People Are More Beautiful Than Flowers (사람이 꽃보다 아름다워)	An Chi-hwan	64
2nd song	City View	Ham Chun-ho	It’s Like That Sometimes (살다보면)	Kwon Jin-won	-

Episode 417

Episode 417 was broadcast on August 20, 2023.

Order	Stage Name	Real Name	Song	Original artist	Vote
Round 2
Pair 1	Luxury Camping	Yoo Hae-joon	Making Memories (추억 만들기)	Kim Hyun-sik	35
Pair 1	Aloha	Lia of ITZY	Because I Love You (이런 밤)	Hwayobi	64
Pair 2	Macaron	Moon Hee-kyung	Face That I Miss (보고싶은 얼굴)	Min Hae-kyung	34
Pair 2	Ocean View	Ahn Ye-eun	Happy Day	Cherry Filter	65
Round 3
Finalists	Aloha	Lia of ITZY	Antifreeze	The Black Skirts	20
Finalists	Ocean View	Ahn Ye-eun	I Am Sorry, I Hate You (미안해 널 미워해)	Jaurim	79
Final
Battle	Ocean View	Ahn Ye-eun	Previous three songs were used as voting standard		49
Battle	Top Class Special Agent	Kim Jong-seo	Stay	Nell	50

=== 207th Generation Mask King ===
- Contestants: Choi Jae-man, Kid Milli, Woojae (Typhoon), Park Se-mee, Choi Jun-seong (GHOST9), Kim Ga-eun, Kim Hye-seon, Kim Young-joo
Episode 418 - 419

Episode 418

Episode 418 was broadcast on August 27, 2023.

Order	Stage Name	Real Name	Song	Original artist	Vote
Round 1
Pair 1	Parking Lot	Choi Jae-man	Butterfly Effect (나비효과)	Shin Seung-hun	61
Pair 1	Car Wash	Kid Milli	Butterfly Effect (나비효과)	Shin Seung-hun	38
2nd song	Car Wash	Kid Milli	As I Told You (말하자면)	Kim Sung-jae	-
Special	Car Wash	Kid Milli	Still Friend?	Kid Milli	-
Pair 2	I Love Singing Table Tennis	Woojae of Typhoon	Cocktail Love (칵테일 사랑)	Marronnier	54
Pair 2	I’m Going To Be The Masked King Gong	Park Se-mee	Cocktail Love (칵테일 사랑)	Marronnier	45
2nd song	I’m Going To Be the Masked King Gong	Park Se-mee	Sseudam Sseudam (Caress) (쓰담쓰담)	10cm	-
Pair 3	Suncream	Choi Jun-seong of GHOST9	Happy Things	J Rabbit	69
Pair 3	Straw Hat	Kim Ga-eun	Happy Things	J Rabbit	30
2nd song	Straw Hat	Kim Ga-eun	So-So (쏘쏘)	Baek A-yeon	-
Pair 4	Sugar-Coated Sweet Potato Wedges	Kim Hye-seon	Run Across The Sky (하늘을 달리다)	Lee Juck	11
Pair 4	Sugar-Coated Fruit Skewers	Kim Young-joo	Run Across The Sky (하늘을 달리다)	Lee Juck	88
2nd song	Sugar-Coated Sweet Potato Wedges	Kim Hye-seon	Love Alone (혼자한 사랑)	Kim Hyun-jung	-

Episode 419

Episode 419 was broadcast on September 3, 2023.

Order	Stage Name	Real Name	Song	Original artist	Vote
Round 2
Pair 1	Parking Lot	Choi Jae-man	You Were Beautiful (예뻤어)	DAY6	19
Pair 1	I Love Singing Table Tennis	Woojae of Typhoon	Alone (홀로)	Jung Key feat. Kim Na-young	80
Pair 2	Suncream	Choi Jun-seong of GHOST9	Beautiful Goodbye (사월이 지나면 우리 헤어져요)	Chen	38
Pair 2	Sugar-Coated Fruit Skewers	Kim Young-joo	Confession (고해)	Yim Jae-beom	61
Round 3
Finalists	I Love Singing Table Tennis	Woojae of Typhoon	By My Side (사랑하자)	SG Wannabe	61
Finalists	Sugar-Coated Fruit Skewers	Kim Young-joo	Peppermint Candy (박하사탕)	YB	38
Final
Battle	I Love Singing Table Tennis	Woojae of Typhoon	Previous three songs were used as voting standard		39
Battle	Top Class Special Agent	Kim Jong-seo	Fly (날아)	Lee Seung-yeol	60

=== 208th Generation Mask King ===
- Contestants: Kim Woo-seok (FANTASY BOYS), Shin Ye-young, Yang Hak-seon, Lee Jeong-bong, Shin Shin-ae, Park Jae-jung, Katie, DK (December)
Episode 420 - 421

Episode 420

Episode 420 was broadcast on September 10, 2023.

Order	Stage Name	Real Name	Song	Original artist	Vote
Round 1
Pair 1	Steamed Clams	Kim Woo-seok of FANTASY BOYS	Love’s Fool (사랑의 바보)	The Nuts	35
Pair 1	Sauna	Shin Ye-young	Love’s Fool (사랑의 바보)	The Nuts	64
2nd song	Steamed Clams	Kim Woo-seok of FANTASY BOYS	Love Always Flees (사랑은 늘 도망가)	Lee Moon-sae	-
Pair 2	Angelic Smile Quokka	Yang Hak-seon	Love Sick (사랑앓이)	F.T. Island	17
Pair 2	Super Popular Panda	Lee Jung-bong	Love Sick (사랑앓이)	F.T. Island	82
2nd song	Angelic Smile Quokka	Yang Hak-seon	I Guess I Loved You (사랑했나봐)	Yoon Do-hyun	-
Pair 3	Ivy Vines	Shin Shin-ae	Bonfire (모닥불)	Park In-hee	27
Pair 3	Chatterbox	Park Jae-jung	Bonfire (모닥불)	Park In-hee	72
2nd song	Ivy Vines	Shin Shin-ae	Rain And Loneliness (비와 외로움)	Windflower (바람꽃)	-
Special	Ivy Vines	Shin Shin-ae	World Is Strange (세상은 요지경)	Shin Shin-ae	-
Special	Ivy Vines	Shin Shin-ae	Let’s Live With a Smile (웃으며 살자)	Shin Shin-ae	-
Pair 4	All-Rounder	Katie	Without a Heart (심장이 없어)	8Eight	22
Pair 4	The Midas Touch	DK of December	Without a Heart (심장이 없어)	8Eight	77
2nd song	All-Rounder	Katie	I Didn’t Weep Tears (눈물이 안났어)	Lim Jeong-hee	-

Episode 421

Episode 421 was broadcast on September 17, 2023.

Order	Stage Name	Real Name	Song	Original artist	Vote
Round 2
Pair 1	Sauna	Shin Ye-young	I’ll Write You a Letter (편지할게요)	Lena Park	55
Pair 1	Super Popular Panda	Lee Jung-bong	Desire And Resent (원하고 원망하죠)	As One	44
Pair 2	Chatterbox	Park Jae-jung	I’ll Be Here (내가 있을게)	Jo	10
Pair 2	The Midas Touch	DK of December	Immortal Love (불명의 사랑)	Jo Sung-mo	89
Round 3
Finalists	Sauna	Shin Ye-young	Never Ending Story	Boohwal	34
Finalists	The Midas Touch	DK of December	Breath (숨)	Park Hyo-shin	65
Final
Battle	The Midas Touch	DK of December	Previous three songs were used as voting standard		65
Battle	Top Class Special Agent	Kim Jong-seo	Good (좋다)	Daybreak	34

=== 209th Generation Mask King ===
- Contestants: Kim Eui-young, Kim Tae-yeon, Noh Seung-ho (Nemesis), Park Jae-min, Coogie, Hong Sung-heon, Bora (Cherry Bullet), Kim Ji-ho
Episode 422 - 423

Episode 422

Episode 422 was broadcast on October 15, 2023 due to the 2023 Hangzhou Asian Games.

Order	Stage Name	Real Name	Song	Original artist	Vote
Round 1
Pair 1	Million Roses	Kim Eui-young	Meet Him Among Them (그중에 그대를 만나)	Lee Sun-hee	48
Pair 1	Chestnut Burr	Kim Tae-yeon	Meet Him Among Them (그중에 그대를 만나)	Lee Sun-hee	51
2nd song	Million Roses	Kim Eui-young	Let’s Not Meet Again (마주치지 말자)	Jang Hye-jin	-
Pair 2	Rice Sack	Noh Seung-ho of Nemesis	Show	Kim Won-jun	53
Pair 2	Baby Sling	Park Jae-min	Show	Kim Won-jun	46
2nd song	Baby Sling	Park Jae-min	I Have To Forget You (슬픔속에 그대를 잊어야만해)	Lee Hyun-woo	-
Pair 3	Older Brother’s Car	Coogie	After Sending You (너를 보내고)	YB	44
Pair 3	Dad’s Car	Hong Sung-heon	After Sending You (너를 보내고)	YB	55
2nd song	Older Brother’s Car	Coogie	Think About’ Chu	Asoto Union	-
Pair 4	Ginkgo Tree	Bora of Cherry Bullet	In The Future (먼훗날에)	Park Jung-woon	85
Pair 4	Bed	Kim Ji-ho	In The Future (먼훗날에)	Park Jung-woon	14
2nd song	Bed	Kim Ji-ho	The Blue Jean Girl (청바지 아가씨)	Love & Peace	-

Episode 423

Episode 423 was broadcast on October 22, 2023.

Order	Stage Name	Real Name	Song	Original artist	Vote
Round 2
Pair 1	Chestnut Burr	Kim Tae-yeon	Back To You Again (너에게로 또 다시)	Byun Jin-sub	37
Pair 1	Rice Sack	Noh Seung-ho of Nemesis	Our Night Is More Beautiful Than Your Day (우리의 밤은 당신의 낮보다 아름답다)	Kona	62
Special	Chestnut Bur	Kim Tae-yeon	Tiger is Coming (범 내려온다)	Leenalchi	-
Pair 2	Dad’s Car	Hong Sung-heon	Sad Promise (슬픈 언약식)	Kim Jung-min	11
Pair 2	Ginkgo Tree	Bora of Cherry Bullet	A Novice’s Love (애송이의 사랑)	Yangpa	88
Round 3
Finalists	Rice Sack	Noh Seung-ho of Nemesis	Wa (와)	Lee Jung-hyun	35
Finalists	Ginkgo Tree	Bora of Cherry Bullet	I Returned (나 돌아가)	Lim Jeong-hee	64
Final
Battle	Ginkgo Tree	Bora of Cherry Bullet	Previous three songs were used as voting standard		22
Battle	The Midas Touch	DK of December	Beautiful Fact (아름다운 사실)	Boohwal	77

=== 210th Generation Mask King ===
- Contestants: Seoho (Oneus), Oh Seung-ah (Rainbow), Kim Ji-hoon (Libelante), Kim Hyeong-seok, Jeon Cho-ah (Ran), Lee Hyun-yi, Kim Yong-myeong, Lee Hyun-song (Bulgogi Disco)
Episode 424 - 425

Episode 424

Episode 424 was broadcast on October 29, 2023.

Order	Stage Name	Real Name	Song	Original artist	Vote
Round 1
Pair 1	Wolf	Seoho of Oneus	Beautiful Restriction (아름다운 구속)	Kim Jong-seo	60
Pair 1	Little Red Riding Hood	Oh Seung-ah of Rainbow	Beautiful Restriction (아름다운 구속)	Kim Jong-seo	39
2nd song	Little Red Riding Hood	Oh Seung-ah of Rainbow	I Fell In Love (난 사랑에 빠졌죠)	Park Ji-yoon	-
Pair 2	Artificial Intelligence	Kim Ji-hoon of Libelante	Sleepless Night Came The Rain (잠 못드는 밤 비는 내리고)	Kim Gun-mo	79
Pair 2	Freak Genius	Kim Hyeong-seok	Sleepless Night Came The Rain (잠 못드는 밤 비는 내리고)	Kim Gun-mo	20
2nd song	Freak Genius	Kim Hyeong-seok	Person Who Gives Happiness (행복을 주는 사람)	Sunflower	-
Pair 3	Morning Coffee	Jeon Cho-ah of Ran	The Song That I Send You (너에게 보내는 노래)	Roller Coaster	80
Pair 3	Afternoon Tea Set	Lee Hyun-yi	The Song That I Send You (너에게 보내는 노래)	Roller Coaster	19
2nd song	Afternoon Tea Set	Lee Hyun-yi	페스티발 (Festival)	Uhm Jung-hwa	-
Pair 4	Get Into Where You Want Taffy	Kim Yong-myeong	Promise (다짐)	Jo Sung-mo	20
Pair 4	Stay Awake And Get A Grip	Lee Hyun-song of Bulgogi Disco	Promise (다짐)	Jo Sung-mo	79
2nd song	Get Into Where You Want Taffy	Kim Yong-myeong	Dazzling Single (화려한 싱글)	Yang Hye-seung	-

Episode 425

Episode 425 was broadcast on November 5, 2023.

Order	Stage Name	Real Name	Song	Original artist	Vote
Round 2
Pair 1	Wolf	Seoho of Oneus	Did You Forget (잊었니)	Lee Seung-chul	30
Pair 1	Artificial Intelligence	Kim Ji-hoon of Libelante	An Ordinary Day (보통의 하루)	Jung Seung-hwan	69
Pair 2	Morning Coffee	Jeon Cho-ah of Ran	We Should’ve Been Friends (친구라도 될 걸 그랬어)	Gummy	58
Pair 2	Stay Awake And Get A Grip	Lee Hyun-song of Bulgogi Disco	I’m My Fan (팬이야)	Jaurim	41
Round 3
Finalists	Artificial Intelligence	Kim Ji-hoon of Libelante	Love is Like a Snowflake (사랑은 눈꽃처럼)	Kim Jun-su	64
Finalists	Morning Coffee	Jeon Cho-ah of Ran	Chain (사슬)	Seomoon Tak	35
Special	Morning Coffee	Jeon Cho-ah	By Chance (어쩌다가)	Jeon Cho-ah	-
Final
Battle	Artificial Intelligence	Kim Ji-hoon of Libelante	Previous three songs were used as voting standard		41
Battle	The Midas Touch	DK of December	After (다음엔)	Yan	58

=== 211th Generation Mask King ===
- Contestants: An Nyeong, Jang Song-ho, Gunji (Gavy NJ), Lee Ji-hyun (Jewelry), Shin A-young, Yuria, Hyojin (ONF), Lee Eun-hyung
Episode 426 - 427

Episode 426

Episode 426 was broadcast on November 12, 2023.

Order	Stage Name	Real Name	Song	Original artist	Vote
Round 1
Pair 1	Take A Good Stab At It If You Don’t Know	#An Nyeong	Aloha (아로하)	Cool	79
Pair 1	Answer Well If You Do Know	Jang Song-ho	Aloha (아로하)	Cool	20
2nd song	Answer Well If You Do Know	Jang Song-ho	Friend From Yeongil Bay (영일만 친구)	Choi Baek-ho	-
Pair 2	Famous Neighborhood Knife-Cut Noodles	Gunji of Gavy NJ	Greenhorn (애송이)	Lexy	74
Pair 2	Mom’s Hand-Pulled Dough Soup	Lee Ji-hyun of Jewelry	Greenhorn (애송이)	Lexy	25
2nd song	Mom’s Hand-Pulled Dough Soup	Lee Ji-hyun of Jewelry	Gates of Dawn (황혼의 문턱)	Wax	-
Pair 3	Steady Seller	Shin A-young	A Morning in Fall (가을 아침)	Yang Hee-eun	27
Pair 3	Best Seller	Yuria	A Morning in Fall (가을 아침)	Yang Hee-eun	72
2nd song	Steady Seller	Shin A-young	Confession (고백)	Park Hey-kyeong	-
Pair 4	Walking A Dog You Don’t Know	Hyojin of ONF	It’s Been a While (오랜만에)	Kin Hyun-cheol	79
Pair 4	6PM My Cat	Lee Eun-hyung	It’s Been a While (오랜만에)	Kin Hyun-cheol	20
2nd song	6PM My Cat	Lee Eun-hyung	Love Alone (혼자하는 사랑)	Ann	-

Episode 427

Episode 427 was broadcast on November 26, 2023, skipping a week to cover the Asia Professional Baseball Championship 2023 final.

Order	Stage Name	Real Name	Song	Original artist	Vote
Round 2
Pair 1	Take A Good Stab At It If You Don’t Know	#An Nyeong	Love Rain (사랑비)	Kim Tae-woo	57
Pair 1	Famous Neighborhood Knife-Cut Noodles	Gunji of Gavy NJ	Don’t Forget Me (잊지 말아요)	Baek Ji-young	42
Pair 2	Best Seller	Yuria	Respect	Ahn Shin-ae	64
Pair 2	Walking A Dog You Don’t Know	Hyojin of ONF	If We Ever Meet Again (우리 다시 만날수 있을까)	Lim Young-woong	35
Round 3
Finalists	Take A Good Stab At It If You Don’t Know	#An Nyeong	Day (하루)	Kim Bum-soo	29
Finalists	Best Seller	Yuria	One Day Only (사계)	M.C The MAX	70
Special	Take A Good Stab At It If You Don’t Know	#An Nyeong	Dial Your Number (너의 번호를 누르고)	#An Nyeong	-
Final
Battle	Best Seller	Yuria	Previous three songs were used as voting standard		49
Battle	The Midas Touch	DK of December	Azalea (진달래꽃)	Maya	50

=== 212th Generation Mask King ===
- Contestants: Jung You-in, Cha Jin-young, Lee Jang-won (Peppertones), Choi Young-jae, YOUHA, Kim Min-ji, Boramiyu, Sandeul (B1A4)
Episode 428 - 429

Episode 428

Episode 428 was broadcast on December 3, 2023.

Order	Stage Name	Real Name	Song	Original artist	Vote
Round 1
Pair 1	Ice Cream Fish Bread	Jung You-in	We Are Breaking Up (헤어지는 중입니다)	Lee Eun-mi	25
Pair 1	Original Egg Bread	Cha Jin-young	We Are Breaking Up (헤어지는 중입니다)	Lee Eun-mi	74
2nd song	Ice Cream Fish Bread	Jung You-in	1.2.3.4	Lee Hi	-
Pair 2	Basketball Court Man	Lee Jang-won of Peppertones	One Step Further (한 걸음 더)	Yoon Sang	80
Pair 2	Baseball Bat Man	Choi Young-jae	One Step Further (한 걸음 더)	Yoon Sang	19
2nd song	Baseball Bat Man	Choi Young-jae	Marry Me (결혼해줘)	Im Chang-jung	-
Pair 3	Tennis	YOUHA	Traffic Light (신호등)	Lee Mu-jin	82
Pair 3	Rhythmic Gymnastics	Kim Min-ji	Traffic Light (신호등)	Lee Mu-jin	17
2nd song	Rhythmic Gymnastics	Kim Min-ji	Drama (드라마)	IU	-
Pair 4	Candle	Boramiyu	It’s You (그대네요)	Sung Si-kyung & IU	43
Pair 4	Incense	Sandeul of B1A4	It’s You (그대네요)	Sung Si-kyung & IU	56
2nd song	Candle	Boramiyu	Grown Ups (어른)	Sondia	-

Episode 429

Episode 429 was broadcast on December 10, 2023.

Order	Stage Name	Real Name	Song	Original artist	Vote
Round 2
Pair 1	Original Egg Bread	Cha Jin-young	Dear Love (사랑아)	The One	74
Pair 1	Basketball Court Man	Lee Jang-won of Peppertones	Rain	Lee Juck	25
Pair 2	Tennis	YOUHA	Super moon	YEGNY	31
Pair 2	Incense	Sandeul of B1A4	Hug Me (안아줘)	Jung Joon-il	68
Round 3
Finalists	Original Egg Bread	Cha Jin-young	You, My Friend (그대 내 친구여)	Patti Kim	31
Finalists	Incense	Sandeul of B1A4	How Love Is (어떻게 사랑이 그래요)	Lee Seung-hwan	68
Special	Original Egg Bread	Cha Jin-young	To Any (애니야)	Cha Jin-young	-
Final
Battle	Incense	Sandeul of B1A4	Previous three songs were used as voting standard		55
Battle	The Midas Touch	DK of December	Missing Child (미아)	Lena Park	44
Special	The Midas Touch	DK of December	She’s Gone	December	-

=== 213th Generation Mask King ===
- Contestants: Jayoung (Rolling Quartz), Wonchae (Queenz Eye), Bang Ye-dam, Yoon Tae-hwa, Kim Sun-keun, Seogi, Seon Woo, Tae Won-seok
Episode 430 - 431

Episode 430

Episode 430 was broadcast on December 17, 2023.

Order	Stage Name	Real Name	Song	Original artist	Vote
Round 1
Pair 1	Toy Soldier	Jayoung of Rolling Quartz	Women’s Generation (여성시대)	SeeYa & Davichi & T-ara	56
Pair 1	Card Soldier	Wonchae of Queenz Eye	Women’s Generation (여성시대)	SeeYa & Davichi & T-ara	43
2nd song	Card Soldier	Wonchae of Queenz Eye	Don’t Think You’re Alone (혼자라고 생각말기)	Kim Bo-kyung	-
Pair 2	It’s Spicy And Tasty	Bang Ye-dam	First Impression (첫인상)	Kim Gun-mo	54
Pair 2	The Soup Is Perfect	Yoon Tae-hwa	First Impression (첫인상)	Kim Gun-mo	45
2nd song	The Soup Is Perfect	Yoon Tae-hwa	The Forgotten Season (잊혀진 계절)	Lee Yong	-
Pair 3	It’s Dangerous Outside Of The Blanket	Kim Sun-keun	A Doll’s Dream (인형의 꿈)	Weather Forecast	11
Pair 3	Winter Hibernation	Seogi	A Doll’s Dream (인형의 꿈)	Weather Forecast	88
2nd song	It’s Dangerous Outside Of The Blanket	Kim Sun-keun	Farewell That Isn’t Farewell (이별이 아닌 이별)	Lee Beom-hak	-
Pair 4	My Mind’s Telepathy	Sunwoo	A Whole New World	Aladdin OST	52
Pair 4	My Heart’s Frequency	Tae Won-seok	A Whole New World	Aladdin OST	47
2nd song	My Heart’s Frequency	Tae Won-seok	Thanks (감사)	Kim Dong-ryul	-

Episode 431

Episode 431 was broadcast on December 24, 2023.

Order	Stage Name	Real Name	Song	Original artist	Vote
Round 2
Pair 1	Toy Soldier	Jayoung of Rolling Quartz	Golden Lady	Lim Jeong-hee	61
Pair 1	It’s Spicy And Tasty	Bang Ye-dam	Get A Guitar	Riize	38
Pair 2	Winter Hibernation	Seogi	I’m Touched By You (넌 감동이었어)	Sung Si-kyung	45
Pair 2	My Mind’s Telepathy	Sunwoo	Breathe (한숨)	Lee Hi	54
Special	Winter Hibernation	Seogi	Boat	george	-
Round 3
Finalists	Toy Soldier	Jayoung of Rolling Quartz	All You Need Is Love (사미인곡)	Seomoon Tak	60
Finalists	My Mind’s Telepathy	Sunwoo	Love Is Always Thirsty (사랑은 언제나 목마르다)	Youme	39
Final
Battle	Toy Soldier	Jayoung of Rolling Quartz	Previous three songs were used as voting standard		36
Battle	Incense	Sandeul of B1A4	Sea Child (바다아이)	Younha	63

=== 214th Generation Mask King ===
- Contestants: Choi Jun-yong, Shin Ji-hoon, Park Jeong-eun, Jung Hyeon-jun, Kim Tae-heon (ZE:A), Han Sang-jin, Lee Seo-yeon (fromis 9), Sung Hoon (Brown Eyed Soul)
Episode 432 - 433

Episode 432

Episode 432 was broadcast on December 31, 2023.

Order	Stage Name	Real Name	Song	Original artist	Vote
Round 1
Pair 1	Don’t Give Up	Choi Jun-yong	The Red Knot (홍연)	Ahn Ye-eun	51
Pair 1	Nice To Meet You	Shin Ji-hoon	The Red Knot (홍연)	Ahn Ye-eun	48
2nd song	Nice To Meet You	Shin Ji-hoon	Summer (뜨거운 여름밤은 가고 남은 건 볼품없지만)	Jannabi	-
Pair 2	Star Fairy	Park Jeong-eun	God Bless Christmas (크리스마스에는 축복을)	Kim Hyun-chul	63
Pair 2	Christmas Fairy	Jung Hyeon-jun	God Bless Christmas (크리스마스에는 축복을)	Kim Hyun-chul	36
2nd song	Christmas Fairy	Jung Hyeon-jun	A Flying Butterfly (나는 나비)	YB	-
Pair 3	Christmas In August	Kim Tae-heon of ZE:A	Don’t Worry (걱정말아요 그대)	Deulgukhwa	60
Pair 3	The Nightmare Before Christmas	Han Sang-jin	Don’t Worry (걱정말아요 그대)	Deulgukhwa	39
2nd song	The Nightmare Before Christmas	Han Sang-jin	Even If The World Tricks You (세상이 그대를 속일지라도)	Kim Jang-hoon	-
Pair 4	Heavy Snowfall	Lee Seo-yeon of fromis_9	Only Look At Me (나만 바라봐)	Taeyang	59
Pair 4	Hamburg Steak	Sung Hoon of Brown Eyed Soul	Only Look At Me (나만 바라봐)	Taeyang	40
2nd song	Hamburg Steak	Sung Hoon of Brown Eyed Soul	Baby Baby	Cho Gyu-chan	-
