= Min Hae-kyung =

South Korean female singer (born 1962)

- Born: April 18, 1961 (age 65); Daegu, South Korea
- Genres: K-pop
- Occupation: Singer
- Instrument: Vocals
- Years active: 1980–present

Korean name
- Hangul: 민해경
- Hanja: 閔海瓊
- RR: Min Haegyeong
- MR: Min Haegyŏng

Min Hae-kyung (born April 18, 1961) is a South Korean female singer. She became famous as a performing artist in the 1980s and is noted for her singing and dancing.

== Biography ==
She was a student at Seoul National Art High School, and made her debut in 1980. An early popular song was her ballad "One Girl's Love Story" (어느 소녀의 사랑이야기). She is married and has one daughter.

Her hobbies include dancing and golf. She speaks Japanese and is familiar with classical dance.

== Awards ==
- 1990, Grand Prize Winner of ABU Song Contest
- 1994, Grand Prize Winner of Teenager Song Contest

== Discography ==
=== Albums ===
- Min Hae Kyung Vol. 2, 1983
- Min Hae Kyung, 1986
- Best 11, 1988
- Min Hae Kyung 9, 1989
- Jump '90, 1990
- Best 2, 1991
- Jump '91, 1991
- Love in Me, 1992
- Best Collection, 1993
- Best of Best, 1995
- Wind of Change, 1995
- Remember, 1996
- U And Me, 1999
- Min Hae Kyung Best – Rose, 2002
- Golden, 2006
- "Vol. 17th: Balance", 2013

== Filmography ==
=== Television shows ===
Year	Title	Role	Ref.
2023	Big Brother Era	Regular Member	
