= I Know (Seo Taiji and Boys song) =

Single by Seo Taiji and Boys

from the album Seo Taiji and Boys
- Language: Korean
- Released: March 23, 1992
- Recorded: 1992
- Genre: K-pop; new jack swing
- Length: 3:47
- Label: Bando Records
- Songwriter: Seo Taiji
- Producer: Seo Taiji

Seo Taiji and Boys singles chronology
"I Know" (1992)	"You, In the Fantasy" (1992)

Music video
- "난 알아요 (I Know)" on YouTube

"I Know" (Korean: 난 알아요; RR: Nan arayo) is the debut single by South Korean boy group Seo Taiji and Boys from their self-titled debut studio album, released on March 23, 1992. It was written and produced entirely by group leader and musician Seo Taiji. Incorporating a mix of Western influences such as hip-hop, new jack swing, and guitars, the song became a pivotal moment in Korean music history and is often credited for setting the foundation for the modern K-pop industry. It was a major commercial hit domestically, breaking the record for the longest charting song at number-one for 17 consecutive weeks.

== Promotion ==
On April 11, 1992, the trio debuted on MBC's talent show with their song "I Know", and got the lowest rating from the jury; however, the song and album of the same name became so successful that it paved the way for other songs of the same format. The birth of modern K-pop has been since largely attributed to their first televised performance on the talent show from that day. The song's success was attributed to its new jack swing-inspired beats and memorable chorus, as well as innovative lyrics which dealt with the problems of Korean society. Their footsteps were followed by a wave of successful hip hop and R&B artists like Yoo Seung-jun, Jinusean, Solid, Deux, 1TYM and Drunken Tiger.

Seo and bandmates' outfits for the promotional cycle of "I Know" included vibrant streetwear such as oversized T-shirts and sweatshirts, windbreakers, overalls worn with one strap, overalls worn with one pant leg rolled up, and American sports team jerseys. Accessories included baseball caps worn backwards, bucket hats, and do-rags. Influenced by the videos for Technotronic's "Pump Up the Jam" (1989) and Snap!'s "The Power" (1990), the music video for "I Know" was directed by Ko Jae-hyung and features varying color saturation and chroma key editing, varying the angles of the dancers' bodies constantly. In an internet survey conducted by MTV Korea in 2004, the video was ranked number 43 in their list of "Best 100 Korean Music Videos".

== Reception and accolades ==
"I Know" ranked number three on the year-end popular songs ranking for 1992, placing behind Shin Seung-hun's "Invisible Love" and 015B's "Old Lovers". Seo Taiji and Boys won several awards with the song, including the Grand Prize daesang at the 3rd Seoul Music Awards. "I Know" received 26 wins on South Korean music programs in 1992, the second-most out of any K-pop song for nearly three decades, behind only "Invisible Love" with 31 wins set earlier that year. "Dynamite" (2020) by BTS would later set a new record with 32 wins in 2021.

Awards and honors
Year	Organization	Award	Result	Ref.
1992	Golden Disc Awards	Main Award (Bonsang)	Won	
1992	MBC Gayo Daejejeon	Best Popular Song	Won	
1992	Seoul Music Awards	Grand Prize (Daesang)	Won	
2023	Korea World Music Culture Hall of Fame	Hall of Fame	Inducted	

"I Know" on ranked listings
Publication	Year	List	Rank	Ref.
Billboard	2023	100 Best Pop Songs Never to Hit the Hot 100	60	
Chosun Monthly	1999	Best Songs of the 20th Century in Korea	4	
Gallup Korea	2006	100 Favorite Korean Songs	5	
MBC Radio	2001	20 Best Korean Songs of All Time	9	
Melon	2021	Top 100 K-pop Songs of All Time	21	
Mnet	2014	Legend 100 Songs	1	
Music Y	2007	100 Best Songs of All Time	73	
Music Y	2014	120 Greatest Dance Songs of All Time	3	
Rolling Stone	2020	75 Greatest Boy Band Songs of All Time	43	
Rolling Stone	2023	100 Greatest Songs in the History of Korean Pop Music	9	
Spin	2012	21 Greatest K-pop Songs of All Time	4	
Sports Dong-a	2008	Top 25 Songs by Experts	1	
uDiscoverMusic	2022	The Best Songs of 1992	39	

== Impact and legacy ==
"I Know" is recognized for establishing the popularity of rap in K-pop and hybridizing the Korean ballad style with rap, rock, and techno. One of the first Korean rap songs, its new jack swing-inspired beats, upbeat rap verses and pop-style choruses combined with a focus on new dance moves took Korean audiences by storm. NPR wrote that "For many South Korean youths, the track was their first exposure to hip-hop and New Jack Swing and a welcome alternative to traditional styles of music". Regarding its release, MTV Iggy wrote that "K-pop music would never be the same" again. "I Know" was one of the first 21 songs to be inducted into the Korea World Music Culture Hall of Fame in 2023.

In a 2008 survey involving 100 music experts in the South Korean entertainment industry, "I Know" ranked number one in their list of 25 best Korean songs in history. Spin magazine named "I Know" number four on their 2012 list of the 21 Greatest K-Pop Songs of All Time. Mnet chose "I Know" as the number one song on their 2014 countdown Legend 100 Songs, a list of the most influential songs in Korean popular music since the 1960s. In 2020, Rolling Stone named the same song number 43 on its list of the 75 Greatest Boy Band Songs of All Time, saying that they steered the "Korean pop scene that we know today", establishing the scene's affection for boy bands and girl groups as opposed to solo acts.

In 2021, online portal Melon and newspaper Seoul Shinmun ranked it as the 21st best K-pop song of all time, with music critic Minjae Jeong writing that "After 'I Know', everything changed. ... Today, it is safe to say that our K-pop-oriented music market actually originated from them." Rolling Stone ranked it the 9th greatest song in the history of Korean music in 2023, writing that it "jolted awake an audience used to traditional trot and pop music, altering the fabric of the Korean music industry forevermore."
