= 1995 in South Korean music =

The following is a list of notable events and releases that happened in 1995 in music in South Korea.

== Debuting and disbanded in 1995 ==
=== Debuting ===
- Ahn Trio
- R.ef
- Turbo

=== Solo debuts ===
- Im Chang-jung
- Jung Jae-hyung
- Tiger JK
- Kim Kyung-ho
- Kim Sung-jae
- Ryu Si-won

=== Reformed groups ===
- Deulgukhwa
- Sinawe

=== Disbandments ===
- Deux

== Releases in 1995 ==
=== January ===
Date	Title	Artist	Genre(s)
21	Wrongful Meeting	Kim Gun-mo	K-pop

=== February ===
Date	Title	Artist	Genre(s)
1	Mystery	SSAW	Jazz-rock fusion

=== March ===
Date	Title	Artist	Genre(s)
1	The Magic of 8 Ball	Solid	K-pop, R&B, Hip hop
1	Rave Effect!!	R.ef	K-pop
28	The Angel Who Lost Wings	Roo'ra	Hip hop

=== April ===
Date	Title	Artist	Genre(s)
1	Already to Me (이미 나에게로)	Im Chang-jung	K-pop
1	Us	Deulgukhwa	Rock
12	Paris Rio	Ahn Trio	Classical
13	Force Deux	Deux	K-pop, Hip hop

=== May ===
Date	Title	Artist	Genre(s)

=== June ===
Date	Title	Artist	Genre(s)
1	Human	Lee Seung-hwan	Pop ballad

=== July ===
Date	Title	Artist	Genre(s)
15	Live 199507121617	Deux	K-pop, Hip hop
26	Gongmudohaga (공무도하가)	Lee Tzsche	K-pop

=== August ===
Date	Title	Artist	Genre(s)
1	매맞는 아이	Sinawe	heavy metal

=== September ===
Date	Title	Artist	Genre(s)
1	Tantara	Park Jin-young	K-pop
1	Enter the Tiger	Tiger JK	Hip hop
1	To Be Or Not To Be	Crash	Thrash metal
6	280 km/h Speed	Turbo	K-pop
15	The Return of N.EX.T Part 2	N.EX.T	Heavy metal
15	Murphy's Law	DJ DOC	K-pop
Unknown	Blue Rhythm	Yoo Young-jin	K-pop

=== October ===
Date	Title	Artist	Genre(s)
1	The [Ku:l] : Love Is..., Waiting	Cool	K-pop
5	Seo Taiji and Boys IV	Seo Taiji and Boys	Rap rock, Alternative rock

=== November ===
Date	Title	Artist	Genre(s)
19	As I Told You	Kim Sung-jae	K-pop, Hip hop

=== December ===
Date	Title	Artist	Genre(s)
1	Kim Kyung Ho	Kim Kyung-ho	Hard rock
16	Reincamation of the Legend	Roo'ra	Hip hop

== Deaths ==
- Kim Sung-jae-(aged 23) singer and rapper (Deux (1993-1995))
