= Seo Taiji and Boys II =

Studio album by Seo Taiji and Boys
- Released: June 21, 1993
- Recorded: 1993
- Studio: Techno Taiji, Seoul
- Genre: R&B, pop, new jack swing, pop-rap
- Length: 30:36
- Language: Korean
- Label: Bando Records
- Producer: Seo Taiji

Seo Taiji and Boys chronology
Seo Taiji and Boys (1992)	Seo Taiji and Boys II (1993)	Seo Taiji and Boys III (1994)

Singles from Seo Taiji and Boys II
- 1. "Anyhow Song" Released: June 21, 1993

Seo Taiji and Boys II is the second studio album by South Korean boy group Seo Taiji and Boys, released via Bando Records on June 21, 1993. With over 2.2 million copies sold, it is one of the best-selling albums in South Korea. The album spawned the hit "Anyhow Song" (Hayeoga) which became its lead single.

== Overview ==
Following the breakout success of their debut album, its followup was highly anticipated. While promoting the second album, Seo Taiji and Boys were banned from appearing on certain television shows, including KBS, because they wore earrings, ripped jeans and had dreadlocks.

== Reception ==
The album was well received in South Korea and continued to build upon the group's popularity, especially amongst teenagers and college students. In November 1993, "Anyhow Song" was deemed the song with the "highest musical perfection" among new generation singers throughout the year. At year-end award shows, Seo Taiji and Boys won the Album Bonsang prize at the 8th Golden Disc Awards in December and was nominated for Album Daesang, but lost to Shin Seung-hun's Because I Love You. In April 1996, Billboard reported that the album had sold over 1.6 million copies, which has since reportedly grown to over 2.2 million copies. In 2007, Kyunghyang Shinmun ranked the album number 30 on its 2007 list of the Top 100 Korean Albums of all time.

== Accolades ==
Awards and nominations
Year	Award-giving body	Category	Result	Ref.
1993	Golden Disc Awards	Album Bonsang (Main Prize)	Won	
1993	Golden Disc Awards	Album Daesang (Grand Prize)	Nominated	
1993	Seoul Music Awards	Grand Prize (Daesang)	Won	

Seo Taiji and Boys II on critic rankings
Publication	List	Ranking	Year
Serv Magazine	Top 100 Korean Albums	37	1998
MBC Radio	Best Korean songs of all time ("Anyhow Song")	Placed	2001
Kyunghyang Shinmun	Top 100 Korean Albums of All Time	30	2007
Music Y	120 best dance songs of all time ("Anyhow Song")	12	2014
Melon	Top 100 Korean Albums of All Time	52	2018

== Track listing ==
English titles are based on the official translations provided by the Seotaiji Company for international markets. All tracks are written by Seo Taiji, except track 3; rap written by William Byun.

Seo Taiji and Boys II track listing
No.	Title	Length
1.	"Yo! Taiji"	0:51
2.	"Anyhow Song" (하여가; Hayeoga)	5:15
3.	"Our Own Memories" (우리들만의 추억; Ulideulman-ui chueog)	3:52
4.	"Swamp of Death" (죽음의 늪; Jug-eum-ui neup)	3:28
5.	"To You" (너에게; Neoege)	4:36
6.	"Who Am I" (수시아; Susia)	4:05
7.	"Last Festival" (마지막 축제; Majimag chugje)	4:38
8.	"Our Own Memories (Instrumental)" (우리들만의 추억)	3:52
Total length:		30:36

15th Anniversary Edition (2007) / Remaster (2009)
No.	Title	Length
9.	"Opening (The Taiji Boys, '93 Last Festival)" (Opening (The Taiji Boys, '93 마지막 축제))	1:20
10.	"Last Festival ('93 Last Festival)" (마지막 축제 ('93 마지막 축제))	4:54
11.	"Who Am I ('93 Last Festival)" (수시아 ('93 마지막 축제))	3:05
12.	"Our Own Memories, Part 1 ('93 Last Festival)" (우리들만의 추억 Part 1 ('93 마지막 축제))	4:41
13.	"Our Own Memories, Part 2 ('93 Last Festival)" (우리들만의 추억 Part 2 ('93 마지막 축제))	6:32
14.	"'93 Anyhow Song Remix (Hip Hop Ver.)" (93 하여가 Remix (Hip Hop Ver))	3:53
15.	"Swamp of Death ('04 Zero Live)" (죽음의 늪 ('04 Zero Live))	3:28
16.	"'93 Anyhow Song (TV Edit)" ('93 하여가 (TV Edit))	4:17
Total length:		62:47

== Personnel ==
- Seo Taiji − vocals, sampling, engineering, guitar on track 2, beat box on track 2, bass on tracks 2, 3, 5, 7 & 8
- Yang Hyun-suk − vocals
- Lee Juno − vocals
- Kim Jong-seo − backing vocals on track 2
- Kim Duk-soo − taepyeongso and samul nori on track 2
- Lee Tae-sub − guitar on track 2
- Ito − guitar on tracks 3−5, 7 & 8
- Lee Jeong-sik − saxophone on track 5
