= List of best-selling albums in South Korea =

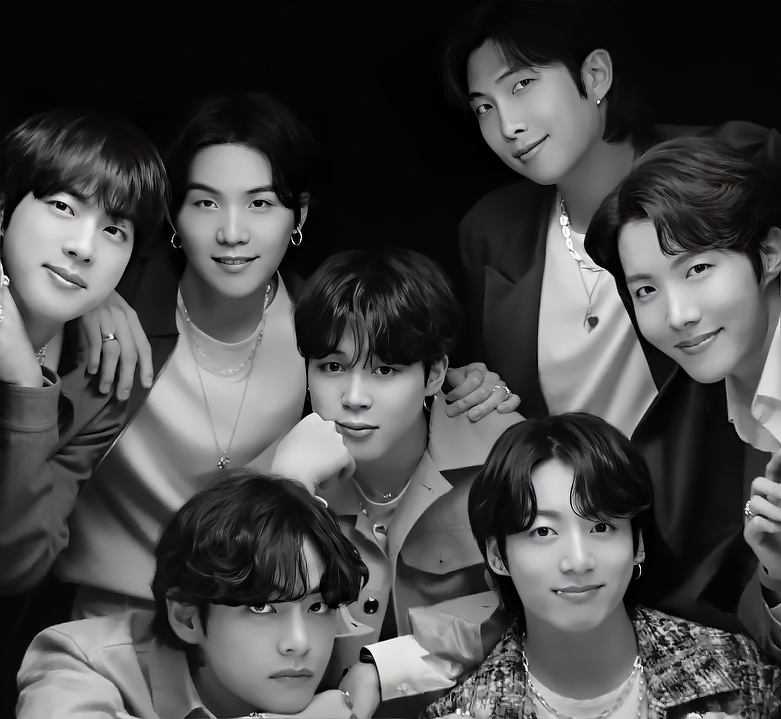
BTS is the best-selling artist in South Korean history with 44.91 million albums sold.

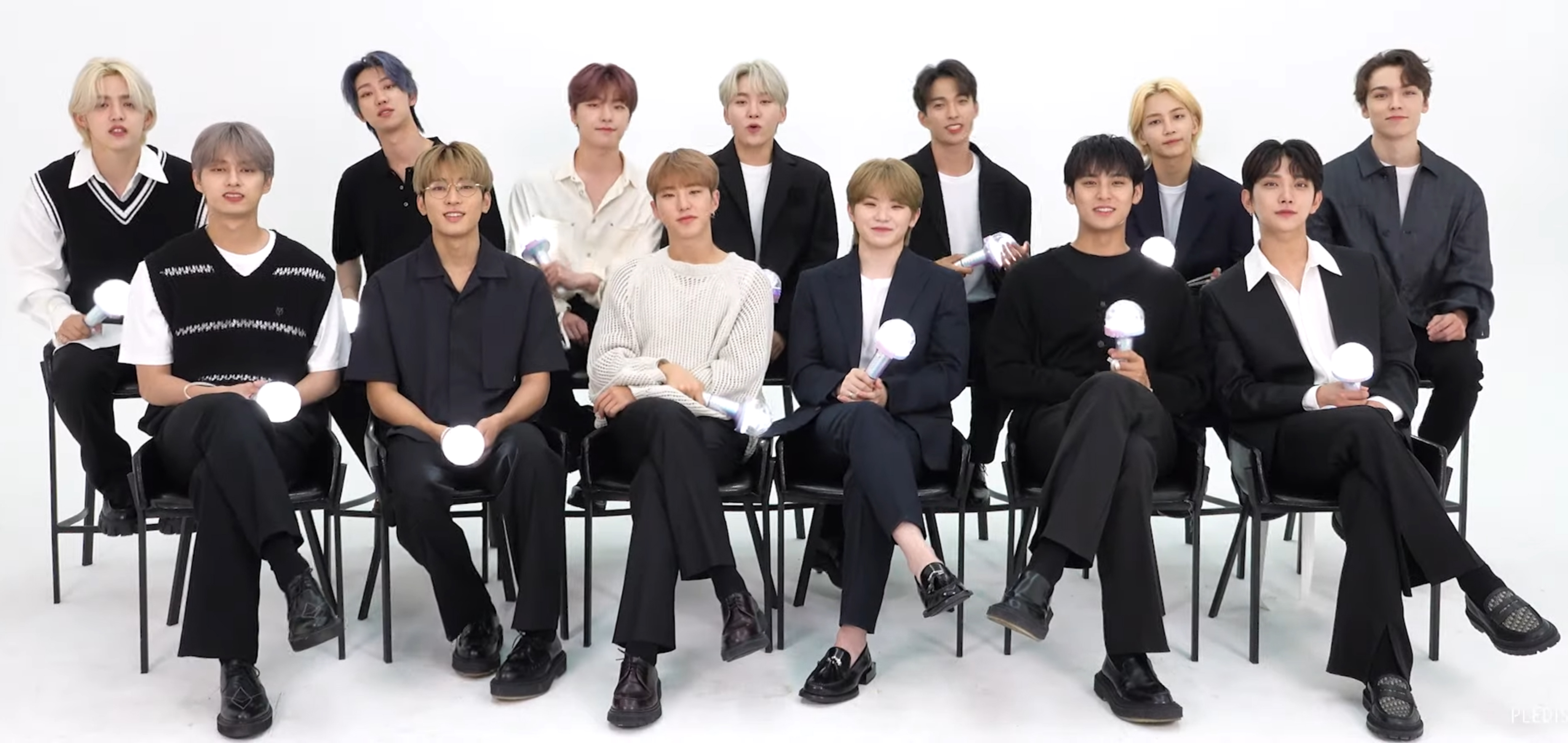
Seventeen has the best-selling album in South Korean history, FML (2023), with 6.39 million copies sold.

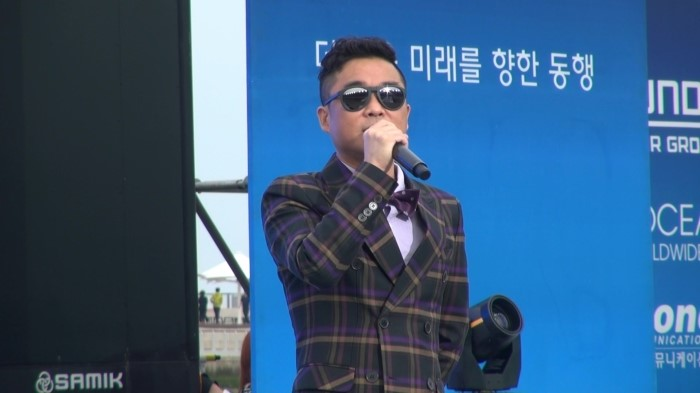
Kim Gun-mo's Wrongful Meeting was the best-selling album in South Korea for 24 years, with an estimated 3.3 million copies sold.

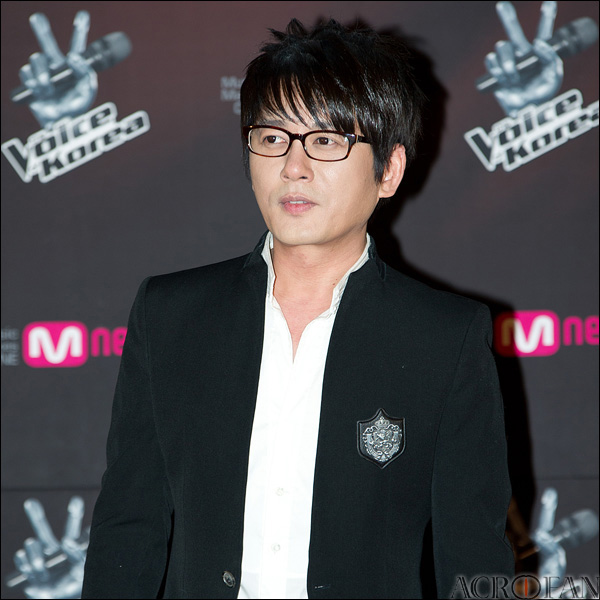
Shin Seung-hun was the best-selling artist in South Korea with 17 million cumulative album sales, until the record was broken by BTS in 2020.

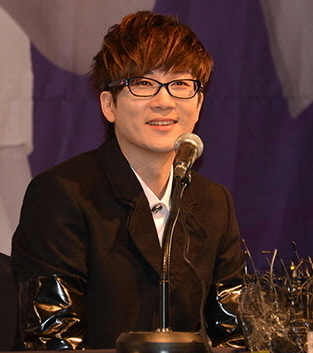
Seo Taiji is the first artist to have a million-seller album both as a soloist and as part of a group.

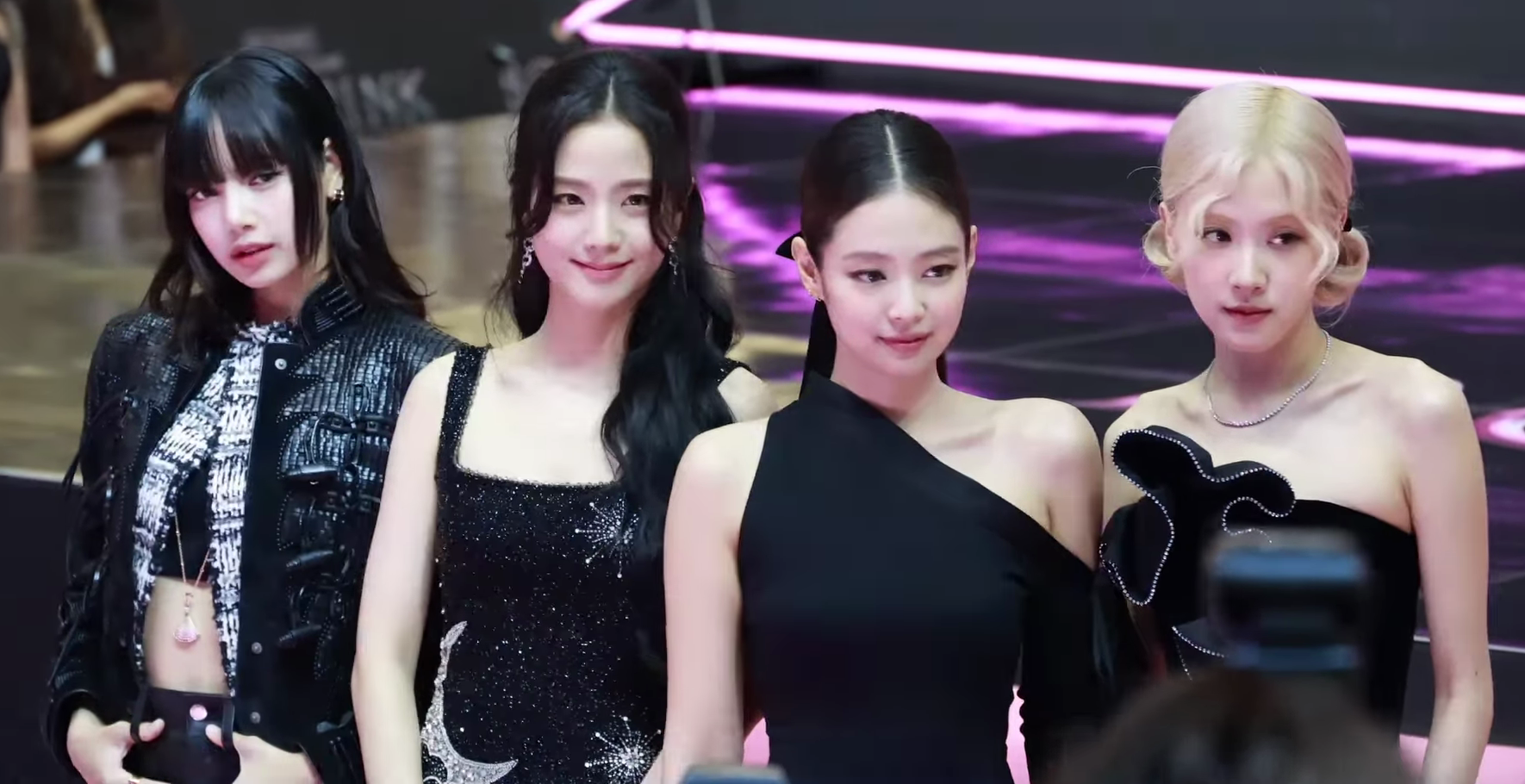
Blackpink has the best-selling album by a female act in South Korean history, Born Pink (2022), with 3.06 million copies sold.

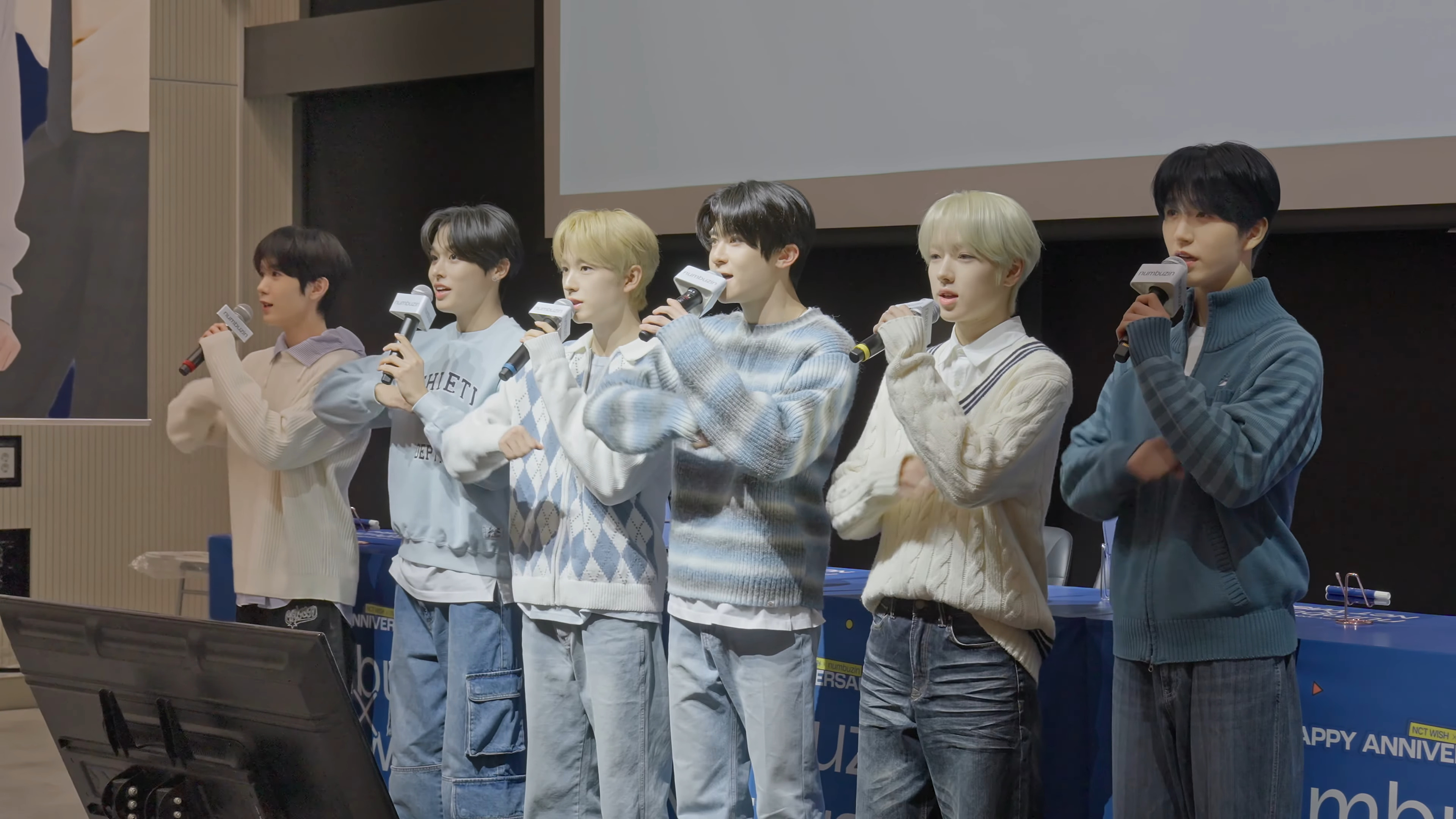
NCT Wish has the best-selling album by an overseas act in South Korean history, Ode to Love, with 1.91 million copies sold.

This is a list of the best-selling albums of recorded music in South Korea. To appear on the list, the figure must have been published by a reliable source and the album must have sold at least 1 million copies. The current record for the two best-selling albums of all time in the country is held by South Korean boy band Seventeen, whose 2023 EPs FML and Seventeenth Heaven sold 6.2 million and 5.8 million copies respectively, globally that year. Kim Gun-mo's 1995 studio album, Wrongful Meeting, previously held the record as the best-selling South Korean album for 24 years, with an estimated 3.3 million copies sold—this includes figures based on illegal sales—until it was surpassed by BTS' Map of the Soul: Persona in 2019.

The Music Industry Association of Korea (MIAK) published the first South Korean sales charts, tallying album sales figures for the month of August and the March–August semester, on September 10, 1998. It published monthly charts until 2008, with fifty chart positions and detailed sales for each album. Following the sharp decline of domestic music sales in the 21st century, the Korea Music Content Association (KMCA) introduced the Gaon Album Chart in February 2010, which included a detailed breakdown of online chart data. The KMCA began awarding sales certifications for albums in April 2018—only albums released after January 1, 2018 are eligible. Certifications are not included in this list, because the Circle Chart (Note: Gaon rebranded to Circle Chart in July 2022) publishes detailed album sales.

In 2023, Circle Chart named BTS the best-selling artist in South Korean history, having sold more than 40 million albums as of that year. The group is also the act with the most million-selling albums, having thirteen. In 2017, BTS' Love Yourself: Her became the first album released since 2001 to sell over 1 million copies, while in 2018 the band's Love Yourself: Answer became the first to sell over 2 million copies since 2000. In 2019, the band's Map of the Soul: Persona became the first album to sell over 3 million copies since 1997. This was followed by Map of the Soul: 7, which became the first album in chart history to surpass 4 and 5 million sales, in 2020 and 2022 respectively. Seventeen's 2023 album, FML, became the first to surpass 6 million sales. The group has the second-most million-selling albums after BTS, with twelve.

All albums that have sold over one million copies in South Korea are by Korean artists, with the exception of The Bodyguard (1992) by Whitney Houston; Music Box (1993) by Mariah Carey; Back to Life (2025) and We on Fire (2026) by &Team; and Poppop (2025), Color (2025), and Ode to Love (2026) by NCT Wish.

== Legend ==
Keys
†	Repackage album
#	Compilation album
‡	Extended play
&	Single album
±	Original soundtrack

== 2 million or more copies ==
Artist	Album	Year	Sales (as of date)	Ref.
Seventeen	FML ‡	2023	6,392,515 (Note: Combined sales of different formats (TAPE, LP, CD, USB, KiT, Platform Album, etc.)) (October 2024)	
Seventeen	Seventeenth Heaven ‡	2023	5,948,309 (December 2025)	
Stray Kids	5-Star	2023	5,357,008 (September 2026)	
BTS	Arirang	2026	5,145,002 (October 2026)	
BTS	Map of the Soul: 7	2020	5,136,682 (August 2026)	
Cortis	GreenGreen ‡	2026	4,791,940 (October 2026)	
Seventeen	Face the Sun	2022	4,742,752 (February 2026)	
BTS	Map of the Soul: Persona ‡	2019	4,714,848 (September 2026)	
Stray Kids	Rock-Star ‡	2023	4,380,512 (September 2026)	
NCT Dream	ISTJ	2023	4,279,203 (December 2023)	
Stray Kids	Karma	2025	3,901,003 (September 2026)	
Stray Kids	Maxident ‡	2022	3,900,928 (October 2026)	
Seventeen	Spill the Feels ‡	2024	3,868,114 (September 2025)	
Stray Kids	This & That ‡	2026	3,863,976 (October 2026)	
BTS	Be	2020	3,794,402 (May 2022)	
Seventeen	17 Is Right Here #	2024	3,660,246 (December 2024)	
BTS	Proof #	2022	3,538,247 (June 2024)	
BTS	Love Yourself: Answer #	2018	3,460,259 (September 2026)	
Stray Kids	Ate ‡	2024	3,328,815 (October 2026)	
BTS	Love Yourself: Tear	2018	3,297,654 (August 2026)	
TXT	The Name Chapter: Temptation ‡	2023	3,272,776 (February 2024)	
Enhypen	Romance: Untold	2024	3,229,665 (August 2026)	
BTS	Butter &	2021	3,197,001 (April 2023)	
BTS	Love Yourself: Her ‡	2017	3,165,529 (February 2026)	
Jungkook	Golden	2023	3,078,744 (October 2026)	
Seventeen	Attacca ‡	2021	3,073,181 (January 2026)	
Blackpink	Born Pink	2022	3,066,220 (February 2026)	
Seventeen	Happy Burstday	2025	3,056,621 (May 2026)	
Kim Gun-mo	Wrongful Meeting	1995	2,860,000 (Note: Wrongful Meeting is estimated (Note: Estimated sales data is based on "Gil Board Chart", illegal copies sold from pirated CD's or cassettes. Though considered unofficial, some of these figures have been verified and used in official capacity, for example, by Guinness World Records and the Golden Disc Awards.) to have sold 3,300,000 copies.) (June 2015)	
Lee Moon-sae	When Love Passes By	1987	2,850,000 (July 2015)	
Stray Kids	Do It	2025	2,823,763 (September 2026)	
TXT	The Name Chapter: Freefall	2023	2,617,920 (February 2024)	
Lee Moon-sae	Standing Under the Shade of a Roadside Tree	1988	2,580,000 (July 2015)	
Enhypen	Desire: Unleash ‡	2025	2,549,360 (March 2026)	
Cortis	Color Outside the Lines ‡	2025	2,533,170 (October 2026)	
NCT Dream	Dream()scape ‡	2024	2,525,324 (December 2024)	
Kim Jong-hwan	Reason for Existence	1996	2,500,000 (August 2017)	
Shin Seung-hun	To Heaven	1996	2,470,000 (October 2015)	
Enhypen	The Sin: Vanish ‡	2026	2,435,174 (August 2026)	
NCT 127	Sticker	2021	2,434,408 (February 2022)	
Seo Taiji and Boys	Seo Taiji and Boys IV	1995	2,400,000 (January 2018)	
V	Layover	2023	2,393,180 (February 2026)	
Stray Kids	Hop	2024	2,373,591 (September 2026)	
NewJeans	Get Up ‡	2023	2,367,363 (October 2026)	
Enhypen	Orange Blood ‡	2023	2,336,695 (April 2026)	
Enhypen	The Sin: Bliss ‡	2026	2,233,223 (September 2026)	
Stray Kids	Oddinary ‡	2022	2,218,221 (September 2026)	
Seo Taiji and Boys	Seo Taiji and Boys II	1993	2,200,000 (January 2018)	
Seventeen	Sector 17 †	2022	2,169,250 (August 2025)	
NCT Dream	Hot Sauce	2021	2,168,436 (December 2022)	
Aespa	My World ‡	2023	2,154,721 (April 2025)	
Jo Kwan-woo	Memory	1995	2,140,000 (Note: Memory is estimated to have sold 3,000,000 copies.) (February 2019)	
Stray Kids	Noeasy	2021	2,126,039 (September 2026)	
Ive	I've Mine	2023	2,110,909 (January 2025)	
TXT	The Star Chapter: Together	2025	2,109,405 (December 2025)	
NCT Dream	Glitch Mode	2022	2,095,544 (December 2022)	
Jo Sung-mo	Let Me Love	2000	2,072,029 (December 2001)	
Jo Sung-mo	For Your Soul	1999	2,047,152 (March 2000)	
Zerobaseone	Youth in the Shade ‡	2023	2,037,790 (December 2023)	
NCT Dream	Candy ‡	2022	2,009,119 (December 2023)	
TXT	Minisode 2: Thursday's Child ‡	2022	2,000,867 (June 2025)	
Yoo Jae-ha	Because I Love You	1987	2,000,000 (June 2011)	
Byun Jin-sub	Back To You	1989	2,000,000 (Note: Back To You is estimated to have sold 3,000,000 copies.) (March 2018)	

== 1 million–1.9 million copies ==
Artist	Album	Year	Sales (as of date)	Ref.
Seventeen	Heng:garæ ‡	2020	1,998,854 (August 2025)	
Plave	Caligo Pt.2	2026	1,989,169 (June 2026)	
Blackpink	Deadline ‡	2026	1,988,245 (June 2026)	
TXT	7th Year: A Moment of Stillness in the Thorns ‡	2026	1,985,016 (June 2026)	
NCT 127	2 Baddies	2022	1,979,926 (December 2022)	
TXT	Minisode 3: Tomorrow ‡	2024	1,972,917 (February 2026)	
DJ DOC	DJ2DOC	1996	1,950,000 (May 2019)	
TXT	The Star Chapter: Sanctuary ‡	2024	1,938,229 (December 2025)	
Enhypen	Dark Blood ‡	2023	1,935,901 (August 2026)	
Riize	Odyssey	2025	1,932,383 (December 2025)	
NCT 127	Fact Check	2023	1,925,318 (December 2023)	
NCT Wish	Ode to Love	2026	1,915,530 (June 2026)	
Exo	Exist	2023	1,897,477 (December 2023)	
Zerobaseone	Melting Point ‡	2023	1,869,783 (February 2024)	
Treasure	Reboot	2023	1,864,072 (December 2023)	
g.o.d	Chapter 3	2000	1,849,381 (June 2001)	
NewJeans	New Jeans ‡	2022	1,845,933 (September 2026)	
Aespa	Girls ‡	2022	1,844,776 (March 2023)	
NCT	Universe	2021	1,838,636 (December 2022)	
Kim Gun-mo	Excuse	1993	1,830,000 (September 2011)	
NewJeans	OMG &	2023	1,822,362 (May 2026)	
Various artists	Sonata #	2001	1,815,296 (December 2003)	
Kim Gun-mo	Exchange	1996	1,810,000 (September 2011)	
Byun Jin-sub	To Be Alone	1988	1,800,000 (December 2015)	
Seo Taiji and Boys	Seo Taiji and Boys	1992	1,800,000 (January 2018)	
Shin Seung-hun	After A Long Time	1994	1,800,000 (October 2006)	
Blackpink	The Album	2020	1,799,558 (February 2026)	
Ateez	The World EP.Fin: Will	2023	1,798,803 (April 2024)	
Jimin	Face	2023	1,780,747 (October 2024)	
Ive	After Like &	2022	1,769,848 (January 2025)	
Ive	Ive Switch ‡	2024	1,750,416 (January 2025)	
Seventeen	Your Choice ‡	2021	1,739,526 (July 2024)	
g.o.d	Chapter 4	2001	1,738,082 (December 2002)	
Ive	I've Ive	2023	1,703,580 (January 2025)	
I-dle	2	2024	1,700,757 (December 2024)	
Shin Seung-hun	Because I Love You	1993	1,700,000 (October 2006)	
Seventeen	An Ode	2019	1,682,966 (January 2024)	
Twice	Ready to Be ‡	2023	1,674,143 (December 2023)	
NCT	Resonance Pt. 1	2020	1,670,800 (September 2022)	
NCT Wish	I Spy ‡	2026	1,649,351 (October 2026)	
Ateez	Golden Hour: Part.1 ‡	2024	1,628,195 (February 2026)	
Enhypen	Romance: Untold -Daydream- †	2024	1,601,007 (August 2026)	
Seo Taiji and Boys	Seo Taiji and Boys III	1994	1,600,000 (April 1996)	
Roo'ra	The Angel Who Lost Wings	1995	1,600,000 (January 1996)	
Jo Sung-mo	Classic	2000	1,599,111 (September 2000)	
NCT	Resonance Pt. 2	2020	1,591,160 (August 2022)	
Enhypen	Manifesto: Day 1 ‡	2022	1,586,220 (May 2023)	
Shin Seung-hun	Invisible Love	1991	1,580,000 (October 2006)	
Le Sserafim	Unforgiven	2023	1,571,548 (December 2023)	
NCT Dream	Dreamscape	2024	1,563,773 (January 2025)	
Enhypen	Dimension: Dilemma	2021	1,556,530 (March 2026)	
Jisoo	Me &	2023	1,542,205 (December 2023)	
BTS	Wings	2016	1,528,355 (April 2023)	
I-dle	I Feel ‡	2023	1,528,183 (April 2025)	
Zerobaseone	Never Say Never	2025	1,526,351 (December 2025)	
NCT Dream	Beatbox †	2022	1,517,211 (December 2022)	
Ateez	The World EP.2: Outlaw ‡	2023	1,501,632 (December 2023)	
Lee Moon-sae	I Don't Know Yet	1985	1,500,000 (July 2015)	
H.O.T.	We Hate All Kinds of Violence	1996	1,500,000 (June 2015)	
H.O.T.	Wolf and Sheep	1997	1,500,000 (December 1998)	
Ive	Ive Empathy ‡	2025	1,483,824 (December 2025)	
NCT Wish	Color ‡	2025	1,476,577 (December 2025)	
NewJeans	Supernatural &	2024	1,476,176 (September 2026)	
BTS	You Never Walk Alone †	2017	1,473,954 (January 2024)	
Exo	Don't Mess Up My Tempo	2018	1,452,030 (December 2018)	
Alpha Drive One	Euphoria ‡	2026	1,442,526 (June 2026)	
Ateez	Golden Hour: Part.5 ‡	2026	1,434,093 (October 2026)	
Aespa	Armageddon	2024	1,421,961 (June 2025)	
Ateez	Golden Hour: Part.4 ‡	2026	1,416,684 (June 2026)	
Riize	II ‡	2026	1,416,203 (July 2026)	
&Team	Mark on Me	2026	1,414,521 (October 2026)	
Shin Seung-hun	Reflection of You in Your Smile	1990	1,400,000 (October 2015)	
Kim Won-jun	While You Were Not Here	1994	1,400,000 (May 2017)	
Kim Gun-mo	Another Days	2001	1,397,388 (February 2002)	
Plave	Hyperdrive ‡	2026	1,396,957 (October 2026)	
Agust D	D-Day	2023	1,395,602 (July 2026)	
H.O.T.	I Yah!	1999	1,383,985 (December 1999)	
NCT Dream	Hello Future †	2021	1,382,783 (August 2022)	
Aespa	Drama ‡	2023	1,373,810 (February 2025)	
&Team	Back to Life ‡	2025	1,354,509 (December 2025)	
NCT Wish	Poppop ‡	2025	1,353,419 (December 2025)	
TWS	No Tragedy ‡	2026	1,344,051 (August 2026)	
Riize	Riizing ‡	2024	1,343,089 (December 2024)	
TXT	The Chaos Chapter: Fight or Escape †	2021	1,339,592 (May 2024)	
Boynextdoor	Home	2026	1,338,476 (August 2026)	
Zerobaseone	You Had Me at Hello ‡	2024	1,327,891 (December 2024)	
Exo	Don't Fight the Feeling ‡	2021	1,326,189 (December 2021)	
Zerobaseone	Blue Paradise ‡	2025	1,322,137 (December 2025)	
Jo Kwan-woo	My Third Story About...	1996	1,300,000 (March 2001)	
Seo Taiji	Ultramania	2000	1,300,000 (April 2003)	
BoyNextDoor	No Genre ‡	2025	1,296,115 (July 2026)	
NewJeans	How Sweet &	2024	1,292,774 (May 2026)	
&Team	We on Fire	2026	1,283,307 (June 2026)	
Seventeen	Semicolon ‡	2020	1,277,935 (January 2024)	
Plave	Plbbuu &	2025	1,262,963 (December 2025)	
Boynextdoor	The Action ‡	2025	1,262,208 (January 2026)	
Le Sserafim	Antifragile ‡	2022	1,241,501 (April 2024)	
Twice	With You-th ‡	2024	1,239,415 (December 2024)	
Baekhyun	Hello, World ‡	2024	1,236,597 (October 2024)	
Ive	Ive Secret ‡	2025	1,213,603 (December 2025)	
NCT 127	Ay-Yo †	2023	1,212,376 (December 2023)	
Kim Gun-mo	Myself	1997	1,210,000 (September 2011)	
Itzy	Kill My Doubt ‡	2023	1,207,934 (August 2023)	
Plave	Caligo Pt.1 ‡	2025	1,201,887 (December 2025)	
Byun Jin-sub	Farewell	1990	1,200,000 (March 2018)	
Whitney Houston/various artists	The Bodyguard Original Soundtrack Album ±	1992	1,200,000 (January 2010)	
Aespa	Rich Man ‡	2025	1,189,803 (January 2026)	
Le Sserafim	Easy ‡	2024	1,185,248 (December 2024)	
BTS	The Most Beautiful Moment in Life: Young Forever #	2016	1,177,385 (September 2026)	
Treasure	Love Pulse ‡	2025	1,172,170 (September 2026)	
Twice	Between 1&2 ‡	2022	1,170,458 (March 2024)	
NCT 127	Favorite †	2021	1,165,336 (December 2021)	
Zerobaseone	Cinema Paradise ‡	2024	1,162,694 (December 2024)	
Alpha Drive One	Unbreakable: 少年Beast ‡	2026	1,152,239 (August 2026)	
Lim Young-woong	Im Hero	2022	1,149,643 (December 2022)	
Seo Taiji	Seo Tai Ji	1998	1,133,736 (September 1998)	
J-Hope	Jack in the Box	2022	1,124,444 (August 2023)	
Aespa	Whiplash ‡	2024	1,124,247 (March 2025)	
Jin	The Astronaut &	2022	1,121,187 (July 2024)	
NCT 127	Walk	2024	1,121,180 (December 2024)	
Clon	Are You Ready?	1996	1,120,000 (August 2015)	
G-Dragon	Übermensch	2025	1,107,137 (December 2025)	
H.O.T.	Resurrection	1998	1,103,439 (February 1999)	
TXT	The Chaos Chapter: Freeze	2021	1,100,038 (January 2024)	
Kim Hyun-sik	My Love by My Side	1991	1,100,000 (Note: My Love by My Side is estimated to have sold 2,000,000 copies.) (January 2014)	
Kim Jong-hwan	For Love	1997	1,100,000 (Note: For Love is estimated to have sold 3,000,000 copies.) (February 2019)	
BTS	The Most Beautiful Moment in Life, Pt. 2 ‡	2015	1,099,384 (September 2026)	
I-dle	We are ‡	2025	1,090,662 (December 2025)	
BoyNextDoor	19.99 ‡	2024	1,089,834 (May 2025)	
Jin	Happy	2024	1,089,358 (November 2025)	
Ive	Revive+	2026	1,082,953 (September 2026)	
Aespa	Dirty Work &	2025	1,079,066 (December 2025)	
Treasure	New Wav ‡	2026	1,077,553 (September 2026)	
Aespa	Lemonade	2026	1,071,002 (July 2026)	
NCT 127	Neo Zone	2020	1,064,647 (October 2022)	
Enhypen	Border: Carnival ‡	2021	1,057,674 (March 2026)	
Itzy	Cheshire ‡	2022	1,056,316 (February 2023)	
NCT	Golden Age	2023	1,048,222 (December 2023)	
Ive	Love Dive &	2022	1,046,467 (January 2025)	
Babymonster	Drip	2024	1,044,365 (February 2026)	
Baekhyun	Essence of Reverie ‡	2025	1,041,012 (December 2025)	
Red Velvet	The ReVe Festival 2022 – Birthday ‡	2022	1,040,744 (April 2023)	
Riize	Get a Guitar &	2023	1,038,084 (December 2023)	
Itzy	Checkmate ‡	2022	1,032,930 (December 2022)	
Baekhyun	Delight ‡	2020	1,031,993 (March 2021)	
NCT Dream	Beat It Up ‡	2025	1,019,878 (December 2025)	
Exo	Reverxe	2026	1,009,991 (June 2026)	
Baekhyun	Bambi ‡	2021	1,007,625 (June 2021)	
Ateez	The World EP.1: Movement ‡	2022	1,007,575 (December 2022)	
NCT Dream	Go Back To The Future	2025	1,002,863 (December 2025)	
Mariah Carey	Music Box	1993	1,000,682 (December 1996)	
The Pearl Sisters	My Dear	1968	1,000,000 (February 2014)	
Shin Jung Hyun & Yup Juns	Shin Jung Hyun & Yup Juns Vol. 1	1974	1,000,000 (September 2007)	
Cho Yong-pil	Woman Outside the Window	1980	1,000,000 (March 2018)	
Joo Hyun-mi	Couple's Party	1984	1,000,000 (June 2015)	
Kim Wan-sun	Pierrot Smiles at Us	1990	1,000,000 (February 2017)	
015B	The Third Wave	1992	1,000,000 (October 2016)	
Kim Gun-mo	Sleepless Rainy Night	1992	1,000,000 (January 2018)	
015B	The Fourth Movement	1993	1,000,000 (October 2016)	
Jo Kwan-woo	My First Story	1994	1,000,000 (March 2001)	
015B	Big 5	1994	1,000,000 (October 2016)	
DJ DOC	4th Album	1997	1,000,000 (August 2016)	
Jo Kwan-woo	Waiting	1997	1,000,000 (April 2013)	

== Best-selling album by year ==
Sales of standard release and reissue albums in a year. This list does not include sales of the same album in other years apart from the specified calendar year. For a list of total sales, see sections above.

Year	Artist	Album	Sales	Ref.
1998	Seo Taiji	Seo Tai Ji	1,133,736 (Note: This figure includes sales up to August 1998 only.)	
1999	Jo Sung-mo	For Your Soul	1,949,043	
2000	Jo Sung-mo	Let Me Love	1,968,967	
2001	Various artists	Sonata #	1,688,129	
2002	Cool	7even	647,052	
2003	Kim Gun-mo	Hestory	529,416	
2004	Seo Taiji	7th Issue	482,066	
2005	SG Wannabe	Saldaga	414,855 (Note: This figure includes repackage sales as only combined sales data was made available after the album's release.)	
2006	TVXQ	"O"-Jung.Ban.Hap.	349,317	
2007	SG Wannabe	The Sentimental Chord	190,998	
2010	Super Junior	Bonamana	200,193	
2011	Girls' Generation	The Boys	385,348	
2012	Super Junior	Sexy, Free & Single	356,431	
2013	Exo	Growl (Korean Version) †	335,823	
2014	Exo-K	Overdose (Korean Version) ‡	385,047	
2015	Exo	Exodus (Korean Version)	478,856	
2016	BTS	Wings	751,301	
2017	BTS	Love Yourself: Her ‡	1,493,443	
2018	BTS	Love Yourself: Answer #	2,197,808	
2019	BTS	Map of the Soul: Persona ‡	3,718,230	
2020	BTS	Map of the Soul: 7	4,376,975	
2021	BTS	Butter &	2,999,407	
2022	BTS	Proof #	3,482,598	
2023	Seventeen	FML ‡	5,546,930	
2024	Seventeen	Spill the Feels ‡	3,180,338	
2025	Stray Kids	Karma	3,397,810	

== See also ==
- List of best-selling singles in South Korea
- List of certified albums in South Korea
