= Seo Taiji and Boys III =

Studio album by Seo Taiji and Boys
- Released: August 13, 1994
- Studio: Conway Studios, Techno Taiji, Atachi Studio
- Genre: Rap rock, heavy metal, alternative metal, alternative rock, pop ballad
- Language: Korean
- Label: Bando Eumban
- Producer: Seo Taiji

Seo Taiji and Boys chronology
Seo Taiji and Boys II (1993)	Seo Taiji and Boys III (1994)	Seo Taiji and Boys IV (1995)

Seo Taiji and Boys III is the third studio album by Korean musical group Seo Taiji and Boys. With over 1.6 million copies sold, it is one of the best-selling albums in South Korea.

== Overview ==
This third album switched gears to being much more heavy metal and rock driven. It was partially recorded in Los Angeles using American session musicians. The danceable tunes are nearly non-existent except "Balhaereul Ggumggumyeo" (발해를 꿈꾸며, "Dreaming of Balhae"), an alternative rock song which indicates a hope of reuniting North and South Korea. Instead, songs such as the controversial "Gyoshil Idea" (교실 이데아, "Classroom Idea") with death growl vocals by Ahn Heung-chan of thrash metal band Crash take center stage.

The version of the album included in Seo Taiji's 15th anniversary box set adds a remix of "Gyoshil Idea" and six live tracks, including a cover of "Farewell to Love" originally by Seo's previous band Sinawe.

== Controversies ==
The songs "Classroom Idea", "Dr. Jekyll and Mr. Hyde" and "It's My Business" highly criticized the older generation of Koreans and their education system.

"Classroom Idea" was extremely critical of the education system and the pressure placed on the country's youth to succeed academically. The fact that Seo is a high school dropout himself added to the discussion, with the group labelled as a negative influence to young people. The song was banned from TV and radio, even though the government run Public Performance Ethics Committee gave the song a pass.

Shortly after the album's release, the group were accused of backmasking Satanic messages in their songs, specifically in "Classroom Idea". Although the mainstream news media later proved these accusations to be based on extremely tenuous evidence, the moral panic proved difficult to eliminate.

== Reception ==
Seo Taiji and Boys won a Golden Disc Award for "Balhaereul Ggumggumyeo" in 1994.

In April 1996, Billboard reported that the album had sold over 1.6 million copies.

Kyunghyang Shinmun ranked the album number 57 on its 2007 list of the Top 100 Pop Albums.

== Track listing ==
English titles are based on the official translations provided by the Seotaiji Company for international markets.

All tracks are written by Seo Taiji, except track 9 lyrics by Yang Hyun-suk, and track 13 lyrics by Kim Jong-seo and music by Kim Jong-seo and Shin Daechul

No.	Title	Length
1.	"Yo! Taiji"	0:45
2.	"Dreaming of Bal-hae" (발해를 꿈꾸며 (해동성국))	4:40
3.	"Through the Eyes of Children" (아이들의 눈으로)	5:07
4.	"Classroom Idea" (교실 이데아)	4:22
5.	"It's My Business" (내 맘이야)	3:01
6.	"Dr. Jekyll and Mr. Hyde" (제킬박사와 하이드)	5:12
7.	"Eternity" (영원 (永遠))	3:46
8.	"Dreaming of Bal-hae (Instrumental)" (발해를 꿈꾸며 (Instrumental))	4:40
9.	"I'm Going to Erase You" (널 지우려 해)	4:35

15th Anniversary Edition (2007) / Remaster (2009)
No.	Title	Length
10.	"Opening ('95 Farewell to the Sky)" (Opening ('95 다른 하늘이 열리고))	2:12
11.	"I'm Going to Erase You ('95 Farewell to the Sky)" (널 지우려해 ('95 다른 하늘이 열리고))	5:20
12.	"Now / To You ('95 Farewell to the Sky)" (이제는, 너에게 ('95 다른 하늘이 열리고))	4:39
13.	"Farewell to Love ('95 Farewell to the Sky)" (Farewell to Love ('95 다른 하늘이 열리고))	5:05
14.	"Taiji Solo ('95 Farewell to the Sky)" (태지 Solo ('95 다른 하늘이 열리고))	4:01
15.	"Classroom Idea ('95 Farewell to the Sky)" (교실 이데아 ('95 다른 하늘이 열리고))	7:47
16.	"'07 Classroom Idea (Remix)" ('07 교실 이데아 (Remix))	3:40

== Personnel ==
- Seo Taiji − vocals, keyboards on tracks 2−5, 8 & 9, guitar on tracks 4 & 6, bass on tracks 4 & 6, computer programming on tracks 3 & 9, drum machine on track 5
- Yang Hyun-suk − vocals
- Lee Juno − vocals
- Tim Pierce − guitar on tracks 2, 5 & 8, acoustic guitar on tracks 2 & 8
- John Pierce − bass on tracks 2, 8 & 9
- Josh Freese − drums on tracks 4, 6 & 9
- Denny Fongheiser − drums on tracks 2 & 8
- Ahn Heung-chan − vocals on tracks 4 & 5
- Gwon Seonmi − cello on tracks 2 & 8
- Japan King − Orchestra strings on track 7
- Choe Taewan − acoustic piano on track 3
- DJ Qbert − scratching on tracks 4 & 5
- Kim Seog-jung − remix of track 16
