= Seo Taiji and Boys (album) =

Studio album by Seo Taiji and Boys
- Released: March 23, 1992
- Recorded: 1991–1992
- Studio: Techno Mix Studio (Seoul)
- Genre: K-pop; new jack swing; dance; R&B; hip hop
- Length: 33:18
- Language: Korean
- Label: Bando Records
- Producer: Yudae Yeong

Seo Taiji and Boys chronology
| Seo Taiji and Boys (1992) | Seo Taiji and Boys II (1993) |

Singles from Seo Taiji and Boys
- 1. "I Know" Released: March 23, 1992; 2. "You, In the Fantasy" Released: March 23, 1992

Seo Taiji and Boys is the debut studio album by South Korean musical trio Seo Taiji and Boys, released via Bando Records on March 23, 1992. Written primarily by Seo Taiji, the record incorporates and fuses various genres including new jack swing, techno, R&B and hip hop. It spawned the group's first big hit and now their signature song, "I Know" (Nan Arayo).

The album brought the group major success, which would continue through the band's next three albums and even frontman Seo Taiji's solo career. With over 1.8 million copies sold, it is one of the best-selling albums in South Korea. Seo Taiji and Boys is considered to be one of the most influential Korean albums with Pitchfork writing that it represents "the dawn of K-pop".

== Background and release ==
The album was released on March 23, 1992, and marked the trio's debut. The album was released in a special 15th Anniversary Edition with bonus tracks in 2007, which includes live tracks and remixes, as well as the video mix of "Nan Arayo". The 2007 edition is also available internationally in digital form through venues such as Amazon and iTunes, with official English titles used by the Seotaiji Company. However, in international territories, the digital version does not include "Rock 'n Roll Dance" in either its original or remixed form, due to licensing issues with using samples from AC/DC's "Back in Black".

== Reception ==
In April 1996, Billboard reported that the album had sold over 1.6 million copies, which has since grown to over 1.8 million copies and is one of the best-selling albums of all time in South Korea.

The album was met with acclaim in both South Korea and abroad, with the Kyunghyang Shinmun ranking the album at number 24 on their 2007 list of the Top 100 Korean Albums. In 2020, Pitchfork rated the album 8.3 out of ten, making it the highest rated Korean album reviewed by the publication. Editor Noah Yoo stated that the album's "canny synthesis of rap, techno, and rock ... would soon be seen as the dawn of K-pop."

== Accolades ==
Seo Taiji and Boys won a Golden Disc Award for "I Know" in 1992. The song received 26 music program awards from June to August 1992. "You, In the Fantasy" also won 16 music program awards from September to November.

Seo Taiji and Boys on critic rankings
| Publication | List | Ranking | Year |
|---|---|---|---|
| Serv Magazine | Greatest 100 Korean Albums | 25 | 1998 |
| MBC Radio | Best albums of all time | Placed | 2001 |
| Kyunghyang Shinmun | Top 100 Korean Albums of All Time | 24 | 2007 |
| Melon | Top 100 Korean Albums of All Time | 22 | 2018 |
| Billboard | 30 Best Boy Band Albums of the Past 30 Years | 11 | 2020 |
| uDiscoverMusic | The Best Albums of 1992 | 40 | 2021 |

== Track listing ==
All tracks are written by Seo Taiji, except track 5 lyrics by Yang Hyun-suk, track 8 lyrics by William B., and track 9 music by Angus Young.

Seo Taiji and Boys track listing
| No. | Title | Length |
|---|---|---|
| 1. | "Yo! Taiji!" | 0:38 |
| 2. | "I Know (Club Mix)" (난 알아요 (Club Mix)) | 3:48 |
| 3. | "You, In the Fantasy" (환상 속의 그대 (Note: The song samples a voice clip of Bart Simpson saying "Hey man! It's me! Bart Simpson!" from The Simpsons.)) | 3:26 |
| 4. | "In the Time Spent With You" (너와 함께한 시간 속에서) | 4:21 |
| 5. | "As the Night Goes On" (이밤이 깊어가지만) | 3:55 |
| 6. | "My Everything (Live Mix)" (내 모든 것 (Live Mix)) | 4:46 |
| 7. | "Now" (이제는) | 4:14 |
| 8. | "Blind Love (English Version)" | 3:57 |
| 9. | "Rock'n Roll Dance ('92 Heavy Mix)" | 3:11 |
| 10. | "Missing" | 1:08 |
| Total length: | | 33:18 |

Seo Taiji and Boys – 15th Anniversary Edition
| No. | Title | Length |
|---|---|---|
| 11. | "You, In the Fantasy Part 3 (Live & Techno Mix)" (환상속의 그대 Part 3 (Live & Techno Mix)) | 3:43 |
| 12. | "As the Night Goes On (Live & Techno Mix)" (이 밤이 깊어가지만 (Live & Techno Mix)) | 5:14 |
| 13. | "Rock'n Roll Dance (Live & Techno Mix)" | 5:16 |
| 14. | "I Know ('04 Zero Live)" (난 알아요 ('04 Zero Live)) | 4:26 |
| 15. | "'92 I Know (TV Edit)" ('92 난 알아요 (TV Edit)) | 3:24 |
| Total length: | | 55:19 |

== Personnel ==
- Seo Taiji − vocals, arrangement, computer programming, synthesizer, guitar on tracks 2, 3 & 8
- Yang Hyun-suk − vocals
- Lee Juno − vocals
- Son Mu-hyeon − guitar on track 6
- Shin Daechul − guitar on track 9
- Kim Jong-seo − chorus
- Jang Hye-jin − chorus
- Lee Jung Sik − saxophone
