= Gwanghwamun Love Song =

Musical

Gwanghwamun Love Song (광화문 연가) is a musical directed by Lee GiNa, written by Ko Sun Woong, composed by Lee Young-hoon and choreographed by Seo Byung Koo. It is about memory, true love and death. It was co-produced by CJ E&M and Seoul City Musical Company.

== Plot ==
In 2017, a middle-aged man, Myungwoo, was in a coma before death. Wulha (god who takes care of human events). He appears in front of Myungwoo and takes him on a journey through his past. The first place that the God brings him to is the moment when Myungwoo meets his first love, Soo-Ah, in the spring of 1984 painting competition. Myungwoo falls in love with this passionate and motivated woman. However, when Myungwoo witnesses Soo-Ah getting attacked by the police during a riot, he feels guilty because he cannot protect her, and eventually leaves her. Myungwoo searches through the moments of regret in his past with Wulha and is led to a mysterious empty house that he cannot remember.

== Casting ==
Production team
Position	Name	Hangul	Career	Hangul
Script	Ko Sun Woong	고선웅	Arirang, script, director, 2015 Werder, dramatized, 2017	아리랑, 대본, 연출, 2015 조씨고아, 각색, 2017
Composer	Lee Yong Hoon	이영훈		
Director	Lee Gi Na	이지나	The Deveil, 2014 Seo Phyeon Je, 2014	더 데빌, 2014 서편제, 2014
Choreography	Seo Byung Koo	서병구		
Music director	Kim Sung Soo	김성수	Jesus Christ Superstar, 2015 Gone Tomorrow, 2016	

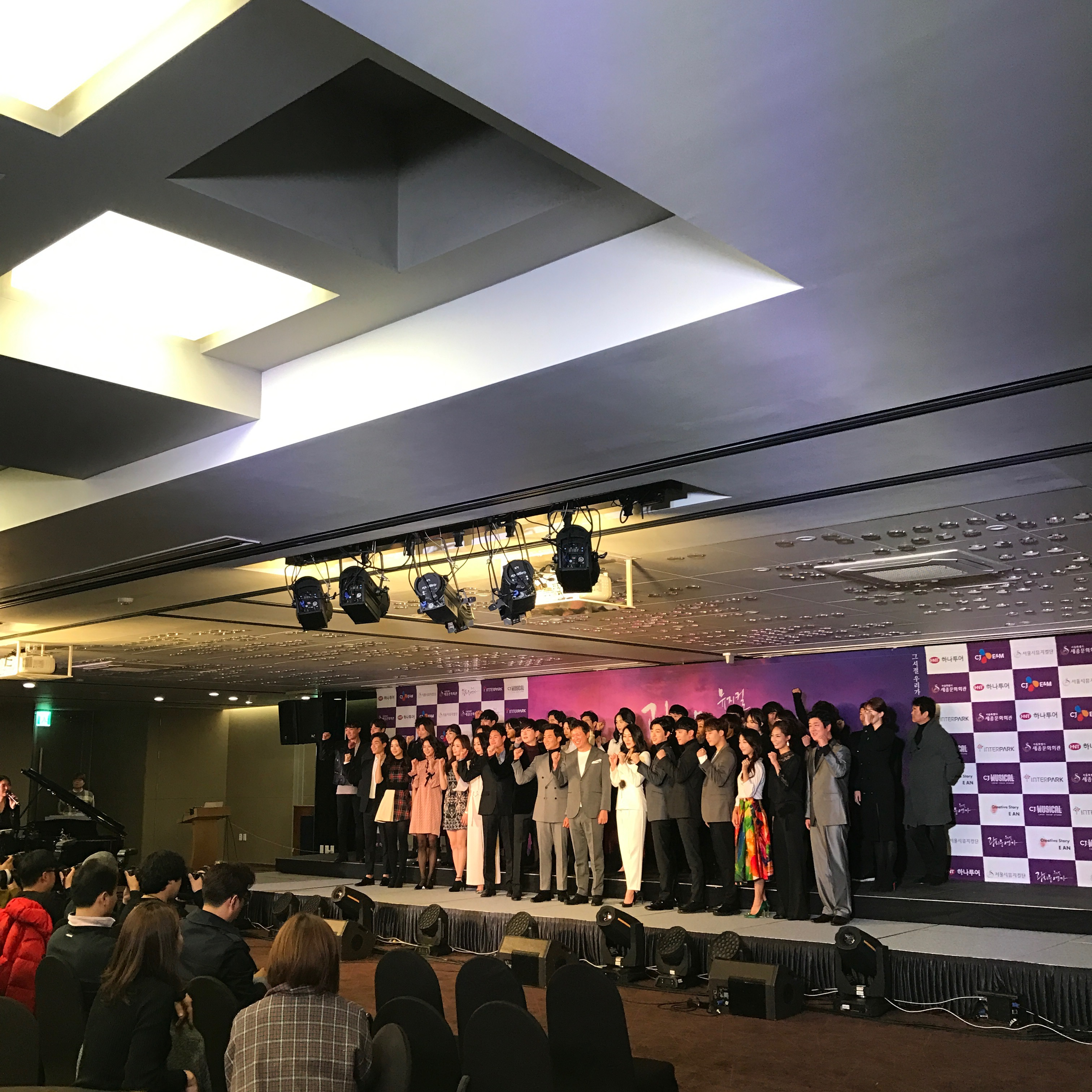
Opening ceremony, 2017

Actor
Character	Hangul	Name	Hangul
Middle age Myung Woo	중년 명우	Ahn Jae Wook Lee Kun Myung Lee Kyung Joon	안재욱 이건명 이경준
Wul Ha	월하	Jung Sung Hwa Cha Ji Yeon	정성화 차지연
Young Age Myung Woo	젊은 명우	Heo Do Young Kim Syung Kyu Park Kang Hyun	허도영 김성규 박강현
Yong Age Soo Ah	젊은 수아	Hong Eun Joo Lindsay	홍은주 린지

== Gwanghwamun love song ==
=== Old version ===
The musical started on March 20, 2011. The composer Lee-Young hoon was passionate about writing the musical and continued writing even while hospitalized. Oh Se-hoon, the mayor of Seoul, and Lee Moon-se attended the opening night performance. Over 40,000 seats were booked before opening night. It received favourable reviews online. People wrote “I can reminisce about the good old days”, “It feels like getting a present from my memory”, and “I cannot sleep after watching its performance”.

=== New version ===
When a musical reopens its series, the crews often refer to the reopening musical as ‘the upgrade’. However, Gwanghwamun Love Song went through a major construction. This musical was the first musical that altered each scene.

=== Actors ===
Gwanghwamun Love Song cast both Sunghwa Jung and Jiyeon Cha as Wulha, which is unusual because they are different genders. Theatre companies often double or triple cast regardless of gender, but this can be more complex in a musical because of the differences in male and female vocal ranges.

== Set list ==
Set list
Song	Hangul
Under the street-tree shadow	가로수 그늘 아래 서면
Flying deep night	깊은 밤을 날아서
Girl	소녀
What it means my love	사랑이란 것은
That was me	그게 나였어
When the autumn comes	가을이 오면
Sunflower	해바라기
My old lady	내 오랜 그녀
Each other	서로가
Red sunset	붉은 노을
All today	오늘 하루
Whistle	휘파람
Only the sound of her laughter	그녀의 웃음소리 뿐
Song of sad love	슬픈 사랑 노래
Gwanghwamun love song	광화문 연가
Merry-go-round	회전목마
Old love	옛사랑
When you live this world	이 세상 살아가다 보면
When love is gone	사랑이 지나가면

== Performance schedule ==
Tour Schedule
Location	Dates	Theater
Seoul	2017.12.15 ~ 2015.01.14.	Seojong Art Center
DaeJeon	2018.01.20. ~ 2018.01.21.	Daejeon Art Center
Geonggi	2018.01.27. ~ 2018.01.28.	Gunpo Culture & Art Center
Daegu	2018.02.02. ~ 2018.02.04.	Geimyung Art Center
Ulsan	2018.02.09. ~ 2018.02.11.	Ulsan Culture & Art Center
Incheon	2018.02.23. ~ 2018.02.25.	Incheon Culture & Art Center
Busan	2018.03.16. ~ 2018.03.18.	Busan Citizen's Hall
