= Seo Taiji and Boys IV =

Studio album by Seo Taiji and Boys
- Released: October 5, 1995
- Recorded: 1995
- Studio: Bay Studio (Seoul); Techno Taiji (Seoul); Ocean Way Studios (Los Angeles)
- Genre: Rap rock, alternative rock
- Length: 47:15
- Language: Korean
- Label: Bando Eumban
- Producer: Seo Taiji

Seo Taiji and Boys chronology
Seo Taiji and Boys III (1994)	Seo Taiji and Boys IV (1995)	Goodbye Best Album (1996)

Singles from Seo Taiji and Boys IV
- 1. "Come Back Home" Released: October 5, 1995; 2. "Regret of the Times" Released: July 10, 1996

Seo Taiji and Boys IV is the fourth and final studio album by Korean musical trio Seo Taiji and Boys, released on October 5, 1995. With 2.4 million copies sold, it is one of the best-selling albums in South Korea. The singles "Come Back Home" and "Regret of the Times" were released off of the album, with the former voted the year's most popular K-pop song by netizens in 2005.

== Background ==
"Come Back Home" was a foray into gangsta rap. Seo Taiji wrote the song about his own experiences running away from home. The third track, "Pilseung" (필승, lit. Must Triumph), was a hit with its alternative rock sound. "Goodbye" on this album is instrumental. A version with vocals was later released on their 1996 compilation, entitled Goodbye Best Album. "Free Style" was written and composed by Seo and his former Sinawe bandmate Kim Jong-seo. Kim provides vocals on the track, appears in its music video and included it on his own 1995 album, Thermal Island. Lee Juno later stated that group leader Seo made the decision to disband Seo Taiji and Boys himself while recording their fourth album, much to the surprise of Yang Hyun-suk and himself.

== Reception ==
In April 1996, Billboard reported that the album was nearing the 2 million copies sold mark. The album has sold over 2.4 million copies, making it the group's best selling album. Kyunghyang Shinmun ranked the album number 36 on its 2007 list of the Top 100 Korean Albums of All Time. Chuck Eddy of Spin wrote that on their fourth album, Seo Taiji and Boys "were all over the map: horse-whinnying Cypress Hill–style nasal frat-hop, Rancid-like surf-guitared ska-punk, metal shrieking, blues-rock solos, flutes, Brazilian percussion, turntable-scratching of acid-rock riffs, smooth-jazz interludes with doo-woppish sha-la-las."

=== Accolades ===
Seo Taiji and Boys IV on critic lists
Critic/Publication	Year	List	Rank	Ref.
Serv Magazine	2005	Top 100 Korean Albums of All Time	18	
Kyunghyang Shinmun	2007	Top 100 Korean Albums of All Time	36	
Music Y	2007	The Best 100 Albums of All Time	4	
100Beat (The Hankyoreh)	2011	Top 100 Albums of the 1990s	26	
Melon	2018	Top 100 Korean Albums of All Time	82	

== Controversies ==
"Come Back Home" has been criticized for being similar to Cypress Hill's 1993 hit "Insane in the Brain". However, Cypress Hill member B-Real later explained they were aware of the controversy but "we were cool about shit like that". "Sidae Yugam" (시대유감, lit. Regret of the Times) was rejected by the Public Performance Ethics Committee for having lyrics that criticized the government. Seo Taiji declined to alter the cited lyrics and instead, the album includes only an instrumental version of the song. The lyrics below were requested be removed/altered, after being translated into English:

Lips stained black. Gone is the era of honest people. [...] How far do you think you can fly with these broken wings of yours? I wish for a new world that will overturn everything. [...] I hope that I can avenge the grudge in my heart.

The backlash from the fans was immense, and the system of 'pre-censorship' (사전심의제) was abolished in June 1996, partially as a result of this. An EP titled Sidae Yugam and including the original vocal version of the song was released a month after the system was abolished.

== Track listing ==
All tracks are written by Seo Taiji, except track 9, which is co-written with Kim Jong-seo..

Seo Taiji and Boys IV track listing
No.	Title	Length
1.	"Yo! Taiji"	1:05
2.	"Sad Pain" (슬픈 아픔)	5:35
3.	"Must Triumph" (필승 (必勝))	3:45
4.	"Come Back Home"	3:54
5.	"Regret of the Times" (시대유감 (時代遺感))	3:23
6.	"1996, When They Conquered the World" (1996, 그들이 지구를 지배했을 때)	3:38
7.	"Taiji Boys"	1:27
8.	"Good Bye"	5:01
9.	"Free Style"	3:53
10.	"Inabilisnabi" (이너비리스너비)	1:11
Total length:		32:52

Seo Taiji and Boys IV — 15th Anniversary Edition
No.	Title	Length
11.	"Sad Pain ('04 Zero Live)" (슬픈 아픔 ('04 Zero Live))	6:00
12.	"Must Triumph ('04 Zero Live)" (필승 ('04 Zero Live))	3:55
13.	"'07 Come Back Home (Remix)"	3:55
Total length:		13:50

== Personnel ==
Credits are adapted from the album's liner notes booklet.

Seo Taiji and Boys

- Seo Taiji – vocals, arrangement, guitar (2, 3, 7, 9, 10), bass (7, 9)
- Yang Hyun-suk – vocals
- Lee Juno – vocals

Additional musicians

- Kim Jong-seo – vocals (9)
- Michael Landau – guitar (1, 5)
- Tim Pierce – guitar (2, 3, 9)
- Josh Freese – drums (1, 2, 3, 5)
- Neil Stubenhaus – bass (1, 2, 3, 5)
- DJ Ralph M. – scratching (4, 9)
- Lee Jeong Sik – saxophone (8)

Technical personnel

- Seo Taiji – producer, recording, mixing (7, 10)
- Kook Kim – co-producer, recording, mixing (7, 10)
- Capital Record Tower Mastering (Los Angeles) – mastering studio
- Sound Vision (Seoul) – mastering studio
- Jason Arnold – mastering
- Kim Ho Jung – mastering
- Larrabee Studio – mixing studio
- Image Studio (Los Angeles) – mixing studio
- Jason Roberts – recording, mixing (except tracks 7, 8, 10)
- John Ven Nest – mixing (8)
- Michael Scotella (Ocean Way Studio) – assistant engineer
- Lamont Hyde (Larrabee Studio) – assistant engineer
- Kim Chul, Lee Sang Chul, Lee Ji Woon, Lee Kyung Mi – management
- Kim Bum Lae – design, computer graphics
- Janice Ha (Team Ace) – design, computer graphics, photography
- Chae Song-ah – copywriter
