= Korean ballad =

Music genre

Ballad (Korean music)
- Stylistic origins: Rhythm and blues; Korean rock; folk music; baroque pop
- Cultural origins: Late 1960s, South Korea
- Typical instruments: Acoustic guitar; violin; drums; vocals

Other topics
- K-pop; Korean rock; R&B; Trot

Korean ballad, also known as K-ballad (often simply referred to by South Koreans as ballad; Korean: 발라드), is a style of music in South Korea and a genre in which soul and rhythm and blues music is transformed to suit Korean sentiment. It became popular in the 1980s, and has influenced and evolved into many different music styles.

== Background ==
Stemming from the international sentimental ballad, the Korean popular ballad has become a nationally recognized and supremely popular music style in Korea. Power ballads from the West, including songs from Barbra Streisand and Lionel Richie, nurtured the growth and popularity of ballads as a genre in Korea. Gaining popularity alongside trot in the 1960s, the ballad is distinguished as "a slow love song built on a Western seven-note scale". However, it was not until the 1980s that the ballad song style became popularized in mainstream Korean culture. From its popularity throughout Korean media, the Korean ballad has influenced and evolved into many different music styles.

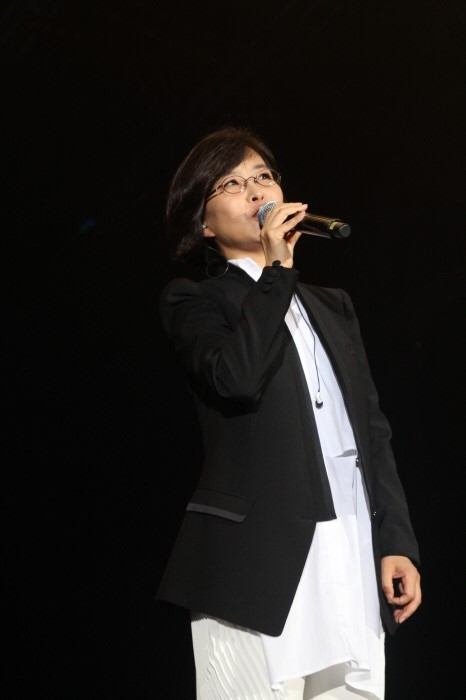
Popular balladeer Lee Sun-hee.

According to an analysis of ballad songs in Made in Korea: Studies in Popular Music, ballads tend to have the following music style:

"intro-A (verse)-A-B-chorus-interlude-A (B)-chorus-bridge-chorus-outro.....[where]...The verse, or section A, was usually composed of eight bars, and its repetition was labeled as A. Section A usually began quietly and transitioned into section B, or the chorus. The bridge before the last chorus helped to escalate the emotions by modulating to a different key or through a grander arrangement. Lastly, in the outro, the accompaniment would come to a full stop or fade out."

Lyrically, ballads often call upon tragic themes of love revolving around topics such as: A breakup, death of a lover, or unrequited love. While still maintaining themes relating to love and loss, songs at the intersections of ballad and other genres can include nontypical instruments or vary in musical style and level of expression.

Popular ballad singers in Korean history include Lee Moon-se, Hye Eun-yi, and Lee Sun-hee.

Early popular Korean ballad songs
Song	Artist	Year	Songwriter
"I Don't Know Yet"	Lee Moon-se	1985	Lee Young-hoon
"Being on My Own"	Byun Jin-sub	1988	Ha Kwang-hun
"Empty Heart"	Lee Seung-hwan	1989	Oh Tae-ho
"In an empty street"	015B	1991	Jung Seok-won
"Invisible Love"	Shin Seung-hun	1991	Shin Seung-hun

=== Establishment of the ballad in popular music ===
From the 1990s, the Korean ballad began to be formalized in its sound, lyrics, and popularity. Many hit albums and iconic artists emerged in this era and competed for mainstream popularity against K-pop, while during this time, offshoot genres from classical, popular ballads, such as rock ballads and R&B ballads, began to foster popularity. Some examples of classic ballad groups include Exhibition and Toy while solo singers include Shin Seung-hun, Yoon Jong-shin, Lee Seung-chul, Im Chang-jung, Sung Si-kyung, Kim Yeon-woo, and more.

From the 2010s leading into the 2020s, ballads lost its position in Korean popular music to more internationally targeted pop music. However, established balladeers such as Sung Si-kyung and Yoon Jong-shin maintain relevance in music and in the mainstream along with a new generation of ballad singers such as Paul Kim, Jung Seung-hwan, Parc Jae-jung, and Huh Gak.

== Intersections with other music styles ==
=== Ballad and trot ===
As the "background music of the Park era" (in reference to the Park Chung-hee dictatorship from 1963 to 1979), trot music was also an extremely popular music style in Korea. Having gained popularity during the Japanese colonial period of Korea, its foreign influences included Western instruments and the Japanese pentatonic minor scale. Popular trot singers notably include Cho Yong-pil, and used a faster paced and fun music style that evolved many times throughout modern Korean history to gain popularity amongst consumers. Due to the skills necessary to sing trot songs, popular singers moved towards ballads for their "easy-listening" style. Unlike trot songs, which derive singing techniques like vibration and pitch changes from older styles like pansori, ballad songs are slow yet simplistic in singing style.

=== Ballad and rock ===
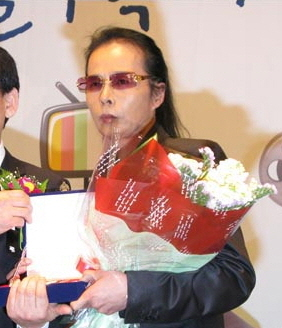
Kim Tae-won, the leader of Boohwal.

With a stronger emphasis on the rhythm, along with the inclusion of instruments more closely related to the rock genre, such as the drums and guitar, rock ballads generally ramp up to a faster pace, higher intensity, and higher notes than classic sentimental ballads. Yim Jae-beom's song "For You" (너를 위해; 2000), begins softly with a keyboard accompanying his singing. However, the song quickly builds with each refrain getting louder than before along with the inclusion of drum accompaniment. As the song continues, the emotion of the song is portrayed by an electric guitar solo. Other popular rock ballad singers and groups include Boohwal, Kim Kyung-ho, and Park Wan-kyu.

The initial wave of popularity in response to rock music in Korea ended before the rise of ballads in the 1980s. However, it became revived in the debuts of popular rock artists like the aforementioned, along with others like Kim Min-jong, and Kim Jung-min in the mid-late 1990s. The trend phase of rock ballads continued into the 2000s with groups like Flower, Buzz, and M.C. the Max, though it fell back to the rise of more medium-tempo and R&B ballads. In the mid 2010s, M.C. the Max released multiple mainstream hits, most notably "No Matter Where" (어디에도; 2016), which remained in the charts of Korean music service Melon for over 100 weeks, reinvigorating public interest in rock ballads. Into the 2020s, they remain one of the few rock ballad acts still active and pushing the movement, with newer singers releasing both covers of former hits and original songs such as Lim Jae-hyun.

=== Ballad and folk ===
Folk music in Korea arose from anti-government movements in the 1970s which consisted largely of college students. Because of its simplistic nature (use of few instruments), it was easy to perform, alluding to its popular name t'ong g'ita ("barrel guitar") named after the barrel which people would sit on while playing instruments.

Popular balladeer Lee Sun-hee has numerous songs that represent a "Korean interpretation of American folk music" through the emphasis of acoustic guitar, such as her song "If You Love Me" (그대가 나를 사랑하신다면; 1991). This song elaborates on how someone should feel if they were truly in love and how that should manifest into their actions toward their loved one (the singer). Throughout the song, a piano melody accompanies Lee Sun-hee until breaks into slower, more melancholic refrains where the soft twang of an acoustic guitar takes the place of the piano.
