= Lee Young-hoon (composer) =

South Korean composer (1960–2008)

- Born: March 6, 1960; Seoul, South Korea
- Died: February 14, 2008 (aged 47)
- Genre: Pop
- Occupation: Composer

Korean name
- Hangul: 이영훈
- RR: I Yeonghun
- MR: I Yŏnghun

Lee Young-hoon (Korean: 이영훈; March 6, 1960 – February 14, 2008) was a South Korean composer best known for the ballads he wrote for singer Lee Moon-sae in the 1980s and 1990s. In the 21st century, his songs have been covered by popular K-pop acts, and were used in the jukebox musical Gwanghwamun Love Song.

== Career ==
Lee Young-Hoon's career as a composer mostly focused on theatre, mainstream media and dance music. After he was introduced to musician and songwriter Lee Moon-sae from Um-inho, he began to compose for the singer. After the success of these songs, Lee Young-Hoon began exploring the 'Pop Ballads' genre. In 1987, Lee Young-Hoon won the Golden Disc Award and the Best Composer Award for "When Love is Gone," "Break Up Story" and "Only the Sound of Her Laughter."

Lee Moon-sae's third collection became a hit selling more than 1,500,000 copies. Lee Moon-sae's fourth collection sold 2,850,000 copies. Lee Moon-sae's fifth album had several thousand pre-orders before it was released, and it brought Lee Moon-sae three Golden Disc Awards. Lee Young-Hoon songs changed people’s perspectives on popular music. These songs became popular among teenagers. His work was credited as playing a significant role in the growth in popularity of the genre. He released eight more albums and three special albums with Lee Moon-sae through 2001.

== Death ==
Lee Young-Hoon was diagnosed with colorectal cancer. Despite his health condition, he continued to compose songs. During this stage, he wrote Old love1·2 and produced the musical Gwanghwamun love song. He died on February 14, 2008, at age 47.

== Discography ==
Translated Song Title	Original Song Title	Singer(s)	Singers in Hangul
Under the Street - Tree Shadow	가로수 그늘 아래 서면	Lee Moon-se Lee Seung-chul (2005) Yim Jae-beom (2006) Jang Jae-in (2010)	이문세 이승철 임재범 장재인
When autumn comes	가을이 오면	Lee Moon-se Seo Young-eun (2004) Park Sun-ju (2006)	이문세 서영은 박선주
Gwanghwamun love song	광화문 연가	Lee Moon-se Lee Soo-young (2004)	이문세 이수영
Meet again	다시 만나리	Lee Moon-se Park Wan-kyu (2006)	이문세 박완규
In the rain	빗속에서	Lee Moon-se Leessang (2010) John Park (2011)	이문세 리쌍 존박
When love is gone	사랑이 지나가면	Lee Moon-se Lee Soo-young (2001) Lee Eun-mi(2005) Kim Ji-soo(2010) IU(2014)	이문세 이수영 이은미 김지수 아이유
The girl	소녀	Lee Moon-se Sung Si-kyung (2004) SG Wannabe (2006) Monday Kids (2011) Oh Hyuk (2015)	이문세 성시경 SG 워너비 먼데이 키즈 오혁
Forever love	영원한 사랑	Lee Moon-se Lee Seung-chul (2006)	이문세 이승철
Sorrow	애수	Lee Moon-se Clazziquai (2006)	이문세 클래지콰이
Old love	옛사랑	Lee Moon-se Brown Eyes (2007) Yoon Jong-shin (2007) Kwak Jin-un (2014) Yoon Min-soo (2015)	이문세 브라운아이즈 윤종신 곽진언 윤민수
Red sunset	붉은 노을	Lee Moon-se Yurisangja (2003) Shinhwa(2004) Bubble Sisters (2006) MC the Max (2007) Big Bang (2008)	이문세 유리상자 신화 버블시스터즈 MC the Max 빅뱅
Good bye story	이별 이야기	Lee Moon-se Seo Young-eun (2004) YB(2007) Wax(2010) Park Bo-ram (2010)	이문세 서영은 YB 왁스 박보람

== Props album ==
Lee Young-Hoon completed the album A Short Piece in 1992 with orchestra musicians from Russia's Bolshoi Theater. The album consists of songs he wrote in his 20s and 30s. The feeling is "wintery", as the songs were based on cold times such as during a snowy winter in Moscow. Its words derive from the prologue of 'Small Pieces, When Love is Gone'.

Lee Young-Hoon composed seven albums in collaboration with singer Lee Moon-se, then moved to Russia and released his Small Pieces album with the Bolshoi orchestra. The first album, featuring "Sorrow String Melody" was released in 1993. He released his second album with the Bolshoi orchestra one year after the first. This album consisted of orchestral arrangements of his previous hit songs. He submitted the work to the largest music exhibition in the world, MIDEM in Cannes. He later released a third album, marking the end of his collaboration with the orchestra. Gun Hee Park, who opened the first internet exhibition in South Korea, designed the album ‘Small Pieces’ and provided his support. Gun Hee Park also experimental thoughts about melody as often and as much to his ability.

Albums
Name	Dates	Tracks
A short piece	15.10.1993	Conversation with you Sad love song Poem in the afternoon Memories of youth Afternoon in Gyeongbokgung Angel of Seoul Your picture Rain in the light
Collection	01.02.1994	When love is gone Girl Under the street-tree shadow Thinker Good bye story Another way Memories of baby’s breath Poem for poem Where the night stay I still don’t know
A small piece	01.10.1994	Flying deep night Tears through mind You in my dream Memories about you Le Balcone North Seoul Composer age of 33 Tears through mind Angel in Seoul Like my thought now on

== Awards ==
He received the grand prize of Golden Disc Award in 1987. He received Golden Disc Awards for three consecutive years from 1986.

== Legacy ==
Before 1980, Korea had no pop music genre. People usually listened to Teuroteu or American songs. However, Lee Young-Hoon and Lee Moon-se created this new genre. As Lee Young-Hoon came up with poetic lyrics, launching the Korean ‘pop ballad’.

In 2000, retro culture started a trend of re-making music, and Lee Young-Hoon’s songs were heavily featured. In 2008 the first album with all re-make songs of Lee Young-Hoon appeared.

Recently, Big Bang, IU, Oh-hyuk covered Lee Young-Hoon’s songs.

The leading music critic in Korea, Lim Jin-mo said, “Lee Young-Hoon’s classic based melody and poetic lyrics improved the dignity of Korean pop music”.
