= Seo Taiji and Boys =

South Korean boy band

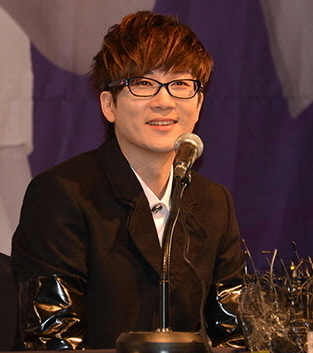
- Seo Taiji in 2014

Background information
- Origin: Seoul, South Korea
- Genres: K-pop; hip-hop; pop; rap rock; alternative rock; alternative metal
- Years active: 1992–1996
- Labels: Bando Eumban; Yedang Company
- Past members: Seo Taiji; Yang Hyun-suk; Lee Juno

- Seo Taiji and Boys
- Hangul: 서태지와 아이들
- RR: Seo Taejiwa aideul
- MR: Sŏ T'aejiwa aidŭl

Seo Taiji and Boys (Korean: 서태지와 아이들) was a South Korean music group active from 1992 to 1996. The three members of the boy band, Seo Taiji, Yang Hyun-suk and Lee Juno, experimented with many different genres of popular Western music. Seo Taiji and Boys was highly successful and is credited with changing the South Korean music industry by pioneering the use of rap in Korean popular music and utilizing social critique, despite pressure from ethics and censorship committees.

The band won the Grand Prize at the Seoul Music Awards in both 1992 and 1993. In April 1996, Billboard reported that the band's first three albums had each sold over 1.6 million copies, with the fourth nearing two million, making all four some of the best-selling albums in South Korea.

== History ==
After the breakup of the heavy metal band Sinawe in 1991, Seo Taiji switched gears and formed the group Seo Taiji and Boys with dancers and backing vocalists Yang Hyun-suk and Lee Juno. Yang said he first met Seo when the musician came to him to learn how to dance. "Blown away" by his music, Yang offered to join the group, and they later recruited Lee who was one of the top dancers in Korea and joined the group as a background dancer, despite being highly regarded in his own right, because the music "moved [his] heart." Seo Taiji came across MIDI technology for the first time in South Korea in the early 1990s and started experimenting with different MIDI sounds to create a new type of music that had not been heard by the public. He initially had no plans to debut as a dance/pop boy group, and Seo Taiji and Boys' mainstream success was a surprise.

=== 1992: "I Know" ===
The trio debuted on MBC's talent show on April 11, 1992, with their song "Nan Arayo" (난 알아요, "I Know") and got the lowest rating from the jury. However, the song and their self-titled debut album became so successful that, according to MTV Iggy, "K-pop" music would never be the same" again. One of the first Korean rap songs, "Nan Arayo" was a hugely successful hit; its new jack swing-inspired beats, upbeat rap verses and pop-style choruses combined with a focus on new dance moves took Korean audiences by storm. Influenced by the videos for Technotronic's "Pump Up the Jam" and Snap!'s "The Power", the music video for "Nan Arayo" features varying color saturation and chroma key editing, varying the angles of the dancers' bodies constantly. The group sold over 1.5 million copies of the album within a month of its release, and Seo Taiji and Boys won a Golden Disc Award for "Nan Arayo" in 1992. Spin named "Nan Arayo" number 4 on their 2012 list of the 21 Greatest K-Pop Songs of All Time. In 2015, Rolling Stone named it number 36 on its list of the 50 Greatest Boy Band Songs of All Time. "Nan Arayo" is also recognized for establishing the popularity of rap in K-pop and hybridizing the Korean ballad style with rap, rock, and techno.

=== 1993: "Hayeoga" ===
Their 1993 second album took a different turn. Although remaining a mostly dance album, a few songs such as "Hayeoga" (하여가, 何如歌, "Anyhow Song") combined elements of heavy metal and traditional Korean folk music through the use of the taepyeongso, a double-reed wind instrument, and melodic structure. While there was controversy that the guitar solo in the middle of the song plagiarized Testament's "First Strike is Deadly", the guitarist for the solo, Lee Tae-Seop, mentioned in an interview that the solo's arpeggios reinterpreted Scandinavian folk songs, which had no copyright. "Hayeoga" earned them their second Golden Disc Award. Moreover, while promoting the album, the group was banned from appearing on the national television channel KBS-TV because they wore earrings, ripped jeans and had dreadlocks, which ethics committees associated with reggae, resistance movements, and rejection of social norms (although their brightly dyed long hair in 1995 did not attract a similar ban). This was the first of the numerous controversies regarding Seo Taiji and Boys. The band's second album became the first 'double million sellers' album in Korean history.

=== 1994: "Classroom Idea" ===
The third album shifted to a more heavy metal and rock style. Danceable tunes were nearly non-existent except "Dreaming of Bal-Hae" (발해를 꿈꾸며), an alternative rock song indicating a hope of reuniting North and South Korea, which earned the group its third Golden Disc Award. Instead, songs such as the controversial "Classroom Idea" (교실 이데아) with death growl vocals, influenced by bands such as the Beastie Boys and Rage Against the Machine, by Ahn Heung-Chan of Crash took center stage. The song was extremely critical of the Korean education system and the pressure placed on youth to succeed academically, such as doing well on university entrance exams. The song was banned from being played on TV and radio (but passed by ethics committees) for the censuring of the education system in its lyrics:

Every morning you lead us into a tiny classroom by 7:30, forcing the same things into the 7 million heads of children around the country. These dark, closed classrooms are swallowing us up. My life is too precious to be wasted here.

Additionally, the band was accused of backmasking Satanic messages in the song. Although the mainstream news media later proved these accusations to be groundless, the moral panic proved difficult to eliminate.

=== 1995: "Regret of the Times" ===
Not backing down, Seo Taiji and Boys' fourth album exploded with more controversial songs. "Come Back Home" was a foray into gangsta rap, featuring a high-pitched nasal voice influenced by B-Real of Cypress Hill in "Insane in the Brain" and by House of Pain. "Pilseung" (필승, 必勝, "Certain Victory") was also a hit with alternative rock sound and shouting voice reminiscent of House of Pain's "Jump Around". However, "Regret of the Times" (시대유감; 時代遺憾) was banned by the Public Performance Ethics Committee for having lyrics that criticized the government. The version of the song included on the album is instrumental only, as a refusal by Seo to rewrite or remove the original three lines that the Ethics Committee demanded be changed (in bold):

Educated elders are walking down the street holding pretty dolls. It seems that the day everyone has been secretly hoping for is coming today. Lips stained black. Gone is the era of honest people. [...] I wish for a new world that'll overturn everything. [...] I hope I can avenge the grudge in my heart. Tonight!

The backlash from the fans was immense, and the system of "pre-censorship" (사전심의제) was abolished in June 1996, partially as a result of this reaction. An EP titled Regret of the Times including the original version of the song was released a month after the system was abolished.

=== 1996: Retirement ===
Seo Taiji and Boys retired from South Korea's popular music scene in January 1996 during its heyday. Lee later stated that Seo made the decision to disband while recording their fourth album, much to the surprise of Yang and himself. The band's announcement of retirement was a huge disappointment for millions of fans in Korea. The compilation album Goodbye Best Album was released later that year.

Seo Taiji headed over to the United States soon after, while Lee Juno and Yang Hyun-suk established record labels right after their retirement. Yang Hyun-suk was successful in founding YG Entertainment, one of the three biggest record companies in the country. Seo Taiji returned to music two years later with a very successful solo career; he is now referred to as "the President of culture" in South Korea. In 2007, all four of Seo Taiji and Boys' albums were included in Kyunghyang Shinmun's Top 100 Pop Albums, with their first ranking the highest at number 24.

In 2014, when asked about a possible Seo Taiji and Boys reunion, Seo revealed that the three members had talked about it often. However, he said:

The biggest obstacle is that in the past, we put on really beautiful performances, which fans remember, but if we get back together now, I worry we might disappoint, so I am not confident. I lack more and more confidence as I get older. I don't think I'd be able to dance as fiercely as I had in the past.

== Impact and legacy ==
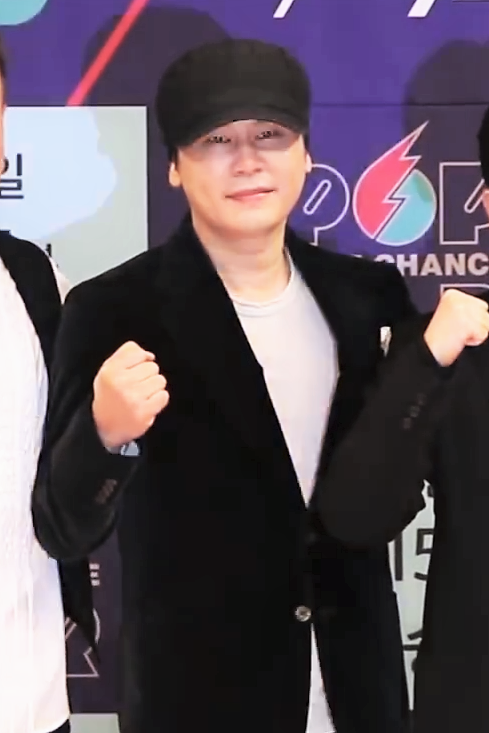
Yang Hyun-suk went on to found YG Entertainment, one of the biggest record companies in Korea.

By incorporating these musical elements with Korea's ballad music, Seo Taiji and Boys provided the basis for the hybridization of Korea's music with that of the West, resulting in the foundation of modern K-pop. This hybridization of music and foregrounding of dance movements was one of the fundamental reasons for the popularity of Korean popular music, especially among teenage and early 20s listeners, as it also promoted Korean popular music's ability to penetrate foreign markets in what has become known as the Korean Wave. Doobo Shim, a researcher of Asian culture, credits Seo Taiji and Boys with creating the "distinctively Korean pop style" which became commonplace. Moreover, the band was voted as the most crucial Korean cultural product in a survey conducted by the Samsung Economic Research Institute in 1997.

Seo Taiji and Boys acted as an instrument of change within Korea, challenging censorship laws as well as the television networks hegemony over the music market. In 1995 the Korean Broadcasting Ethics Committee demanded that Seo Taiji and Boys change the lyrics for "Shidae Yugam". This incited protests and resulted in the abolishment of music pre-censorship in Korea. Seo Taiji also did not have to rely on television networks due to the fact that he owned his own studio. This autonomy allowed Seo to bring subcultures in Korea, such as heavy metal, to the forefront of popular culture and challenge pervasive social norms. The band's independent success diminished the power of the television networks to dictate which artists appeared on shows, and gave rise to the influence of record labels and talent agencies. Such companies led to the formation of bands such as H.O.T., Sechs Kies, Uptown, and Shinhwa.

Additionally, Seo Taiji and Boys' fashion contrasted sharply with the convention at the time. The band members' style ranged from wearing tailored jackets and neat dress shirts to street fashion. They incorporated traditional Korean folk costumes and Scottish kilts, showcasing a variety of cultures. Seo Taiji and Boys pioneered the "snowboard look", which included dark sunglasses, ski hats, and large parkas. Furthermore, the band members' wearing of dreadlocks in 1993 caused a reactionary ban of the band on national television.

Another aspect of Korean pop that Seo Taiji and Boys influenced was dance. The band was the first to turn dance into a dominant feature in performance by including breakdancing routines. Dancer Nam Hyun-joon cites Seo Taiji and Boys as a primary influence, and appeared in one of band member Lee Juno's music videos.

Celebrating the Seo Taiji and Boys' 25th anniversary project "Time: Traveler", the band BTS remade "Come Back Home" in 2017, reflecting a similar sentiment to the societal change that Seo argued for in his songs. While maintaining the gangsta rap style, J-Hope raps: "I feel suffocated in my life. What is blocking my life is my fear towards tomorrow," while RM adds, "Because we are still young, there's a decent future. Now wipe those old tears and come back home." While Seo's social critique of Korean culture was predated by songs of Kim Min-ki, who focused on political violence during the Fourth Republic of Korea under the leader Park Chung Hee, Seo's songs included more direct lyrics and maintained his musical identity by refusing to acquiesce to the pre-censorship policies of the time. In fact, his artistry was unhampered by marketing and advertising campaigns, which may have contributed to the band's success.

== Members ==
- Seo Taiji (서태지) – lead vocals, bass, guitar, keyboards, main songwriter, leader
- Yang Hyun-suk (양현석) – backing vocals, rapper, choreography
- Lee Juno (이주노) – backing vocals, choreography

== Discography ==
=== Studio albums ===
Title	Album details	Sales
Seo Taiji and Boys	Released: March 23, 1992; Label: Bando Records; Formats: CD, cassette	KOR: 1,800,000
Seo Taiji and Boys II	Released: June 21, 1993; Label: Bando Records; Formats: CD, cassette	KOR: 2,200,000
Seo Taiji and Boys III	Released: August 13, 1994; Label: Bando Records; Formats: CD, cassette	KOR: 1,600,000
Seo Taiji and Boys IV	Released: October 5, 1995; Label: Bando Records; Formats: CD, cassette	KOR: 2,400,000

=== Singles ===
Title	Year	Album
"I Know" (난 알아요)	1992	Seo Taiji and Boys
"You, In the Fantasy" (환상 속의 그대)	1992	Seo Taiji and Boys
"Anyhow Song" (하여가)	1993	Seo Taiji and Boys II
"Classroom Idea" (교실 이데아)	1994	Seo Taiji and Boys III
"Dreaming of Balhae" (발해를 꿈꾸며)	1994	Seo Taiji and Boys III
"Come Back Home"	1995	Seo Taiji and Boys IV
"Regret of the Times" (시대유감)	1995	Seo Taiji and Boys IV
Chart positions are not available for singles.

=== Other releases ===
Live and remix albums

- Taiji Boys Live & Techno Mix (1992)
- '93 Last Festival (1994)
- '95 Taijiboys Concert: Farewell to the Sky (1995)

Compilations

- Seo Taiji and Boys (1994, Japan-exclusive)
- Goodbye Best Album (1996)

DVD

- Seotaiji [&] 20: We Are Here: '93 Last Festival / '95 Taijiboys Concert: Farewell to the Sky (2012)

== Awards ==
Name of the award, year presented, award category, nominee and result of the nomination
Award	Year	Category	Nominee/work	Result	Ref.
Golden Disc Awards	1992	Main Award (Bonsang)	"I Know"	Won	
Golden Disc Awards	1993	Main Award (Bonsang)	"Hayeoga"	Won	
Golden Disc Awards	1994	Main Award (Bonsang)	"Dreaming of Bal-hae"	Won	
Golden Disc Awards	1995	Popularity Award	"Come Back Home"	Won	
KBS Music Awards	1992	Singer of the Year (Bonsang)	Seo Taiji and Boys	Won	
KBS Music Awards	1993	Singer of the Year (Bonsang)	Seo Taiji and Boys	Won	
KBS Music Awards	1995	Singer of the Year (Bonsang)	Seo Taiji and Boys	Won	
MBC Gayo Daejejeon	1992	Best Popular Song	"I Know"	Won	
MBC Gayo Daejejeon	1992	Best New Artist	Seo Taiji and Boys	Won	
MBC Gayo Daejejeon	1995	Best Popular Song	"Come Back Home"	Won	
MTV Video Music Awards	1996	International Viewer's Choice: MTV Asia	"Come Back Home"	Won	
Seoul Music Awards	1992	Grand Prize (Daesang)	"I Know"	Won	
Seoul Music Awards	1992	Main Prize (Bonsang)	Seo Taiji and Boys	Won	
Seoul Music Awards	1992	Best New Artist	Seo Taiji and Boys	Won	
Seoul Music Awards	1993	Grand Prize (Daesang)	"Hayeoga"	Won	
Seoul Music Awards	1993	Main Prize (Bonsang)	Seo Taiji and Boys	Won	
Seoul Music Awards	1995	Main Prize (Bonsang)	Seo Taiji and Boys	Won	

== See also ==
- Korean pop
- Korean hip hop
