= Jo Tong-dal =

South Korean singer (born 1945)

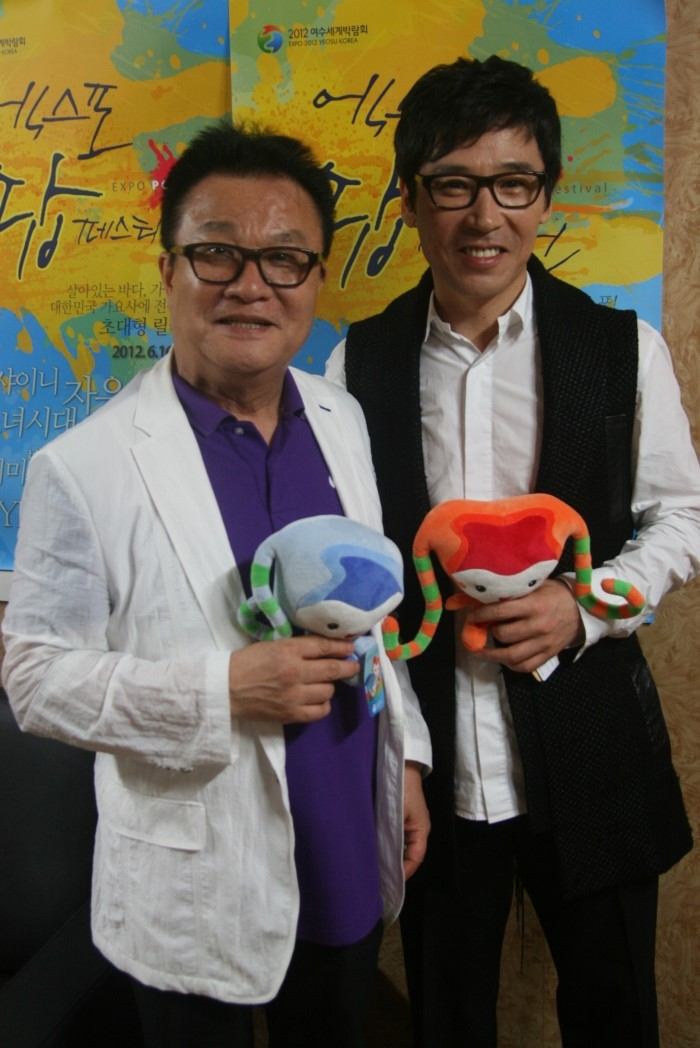
- Jo (on the left) in 2014

Korean name
- Hangul: 조통달
- Hanja: 趙通達
- RR: Jo Tongdal
- MR: Cho T'ongdal

Jo Tongdal (Korean: 조통달; born June 6, 1945) is a Korean pansori singer from Iksan, North Jeolla Province. He is chairman of the Board of Sejong Traditional Arts Promotion Atheneum, Jo Tongdal Pansori Learning Center. His son is Korean singer Jo Kwanwoo. Jo Tongdal is a designated Korean human cultural asset.

== Awards ==
- 1987, Namdo Arts, President Award (남도예술제 대통령상)
- 1972, 8th Jeonju Daesaseupnori Prize (제8회 전주대사습놀이 장원)
