= Come Back Home (Seo Taiji and Boys song) =

Single by Seo Taiji and Boys

from the album Seo Taiji and Boys IV
- Language: Korean
- Released: October 5, 1995
- Recorded: 1995
- Genre: K-pop; hip hop
- Length: 3:54
- Label: Bando Records
- Songwriter: Seo Taiji
- Producer: Seo Taiji

Seo Taiji and Boys singles chronology
"Dreaming of Balhae" (1994)	"Come Back Home" (1995)	"Regret of the Times" (1995)

Music video
- "Come Back Home" on YouTube

"Come Back Home" is a song by South Korean boy band Seo Taiji and Boys, from their fourth and final self-titled studio album, which was released on October 5, 1995. The group's foray into gangsta rap, the song's lyrical content addresses the societal pressures on young people that push them to run away from home, while the refrain conveys the perspective of the runaways' parents.

Following its release, "Come Back Home" was met with success in South Korea, and achieved the top positions on music program charts for multiple weeks. It won several awards, including the Asia Viewer's Choice Award at the 1996 MTV Video Music Awards. In 2007, music webzine Music Y ranked it as the fourth best Korean song of all time.

== Music and lyrics ==
"Come Back Home" is a song that is rooted in gangsta rap; according to The Korea Foundation, it provided the grounds for hip-hop music to take root in Korea. Its lyrical content revolves around the problem of the increasing number of teenage runways around the time of its release, as Seo Taiji often ran away himself while he was younger. In an interview with The Chosun Ilbo in 2008, Seo revealed that he often ran away from middle school and almost dropped out due to corporal punishment in the classroom; however, he credited his third year middle school teacher for guiding him and abolishing physical punishments in his class. He said that "When making 'Come Back Home', I put everything I felt when I was in third grade in that song."

The song's chorus line supports the perspective of the parents' worries, thereby serving as a sort of mediator between the teenagers and parents. While the majority of the song was written in Korean, assistant professor of music at University of Hildesheim Michael Fuhr wrote that the function of the English words that were used in the title and the refrain: "you must come back home", served as an attention getter. Fuhr said that the code-switching between English and Korean represented the generational gap between parents and youth, whereas the English chorus formulates a greater appeal to younger generations than it would with Korean words.

== Reception ==
The song was received well in South Korea upon its release—according to a poll conducted by Mnet in 2005, it was the ranked the most popular song from 1995. The Korea Herald wrote that "The track, which dealt with the issue of teenage runaways, had a ripple effect of bringing runaway teenagers back home." In 2007, webzine Music Y ranked "Come Back Home" number four in their list of 100 Best Korean Songs of all-time. In 2021, it was included in Melon and Seoul Shinmun's list of 100 top K-pop songs since 1992, with KBS Radio director Soyeon Kang writing that because of the song and its refrain, teenagers who ran away returned home; its expression of real-world problems was "a social phenomenon that went beyond simply music."

"Come Back Home" has been criticized for being similar to American hip hop group Cypress Hill's 1993 song "Insane in the Brain". Cypress Hill member B-Real later explained that they were aware of the controversy but "we were cool about shit like that."

=== Accolades ===
Seo Taiji and Boys won several accolades with "Come Back Home", including the Asia Viewer's Choice Award at the 1996 MTV Video Music Awards—their first international award. The song additionally earned 11 wins on South Korean weekly music programs throughout November–early December 1995, including five consecutive wins on KBS's Top 10 Songs, and two triple crowns (three wins) on the programs SBS's Inkigayo and MBC's Popular Songs Best 50.

Awards
Year	Organization	Award	Result	Ref.
1995	Golden Disc Awards	Popularity Award	Won	
1995	MBC Gayo Daejejeon	Best Popular Song	Won	
1996	MTV Video Music Awards	Asia Viewer's Choice Award	Won	

== Music video ==
The music video was directed by Hong Jong-ho. Set in an abandoned building and on the street corners of a city, the music video opens with a teenager running out of his house after arguing with his father. He then ventures off into the woods, backyards, and the streets of the city. The scenes of the boy running away are juxtaposed with Seo Taiji and Boys along with their dancers performing the choreography in the abandoned building. Meanwhile, as the teenager recalls the dispute, his face and body gestures reflect his distress. However, he is suddenly chased by a group of mobsters who beat him up and hurl him to the ground. Seo Taiji and Boys appear and is seen through the window of the boy's house, as the teenager eventually returns to his home on a sunny afternoon. The last scene finishes with a close-up of Seo smiling as he sits in the abandoned building. The video conveys the primary theme expressed through the song's lyrics, where it contrasts the dark and rough images of the outside world with the bright and welcoming imagery of the teenager's home.

In April 2005, Mnet ranked it one the top ten best music videos in South Korea released within the past decade.

== Covers and other usage ==
In 2014, girl group 2NE1 (who were signed under band member Yang Hyun-suk's label YG Entertainment) released the single "Come Back Home" as part of their final studio album. Although not a cover, the song's choreography was specifically requested by the 2NE1 members to incorporate dance moves from the version by Seo Taiji and Boys, as they felt that its elements would also suit the color of their new performances. As part of Seo Taiji's 25th anniversary project "Time: Traveler", boy group BTS released a remake of the song in July 2017. In their version, group members J-Hope and RM reworked the sound and lyrics with Seo Taiji himself while retaining its similar sentiments toward societal change, in addition to keeping the "intensely dark feeling" that was present in the original version. BTS was later invited by Seo to perform as backup vocalists and dancers for eight songs in his Seoul Olympic Stadium concert held early September.
