= Wrongful Meeting =

Studio album by Kim Gun-mo
- Released: January 21, 1995
- Recorded: 1994–1995
- Genre: Dance; ballad
- Length: 47:25
- Language: Korean
- Label: Line Production
- Producer: Kim Chang-hwan; Cheon Seong-il; Kim Gun-mo; Kim Woo-jin; Kim Hyeong-seok

Kim Gun-mo chronology
Excuses (1993)	Wrongful Meeting (1995)	Exchange (1996)

Singles from Wrongful Meeting
- 1. "Wrongful Meeting" Released: January 21, 1995

Wrongful Meeting (Korean: 잘못된 만남; RR: Jalmotdoen Mannam) is the third studio album by South Korean singer Kim Gun-mo, released on January 21, 1995. The record spawned the title track of the same name, which is considered one of the biggest hits in South Korea during the 1990s. The album held the record for biggest selling album in South Korea for 24 years, with sales of over 3.3 million copies.

== Background and release ==
Wrongful Meeting was released through the Line Production agency in January 1995. The record contains various genres including dance, reggae, hip-hop, jazz and funk as well as ballad, and a cappella tracks.

== Reception ==
On March 10, 1995, Wrongful Meeting surpassed sales of over 2 million copies. That May, the album was recorded as the best-selling album in South Korea and was included in the Guinness Book of Records in Korea, selling over 2.57 million copies. Because of its huge popularity in South Korea, Japanese newspaper Japan Express named "Wrongful Meeting" one of the top 5 products from South Korea during 1995.

== Accolades ==
=== Awards ===
On domestic music programs, "Wrongful Meeting" received 13 music show awards from March to April 1995, including 5 wins on KBS, 6 wins on SBS, and 2 wins on MBC.

Organization	Year	Category	Result	Ref.
Golden Disc Awards	1995	Album Bonsang (Main Prize)	Won	
Golden Disc Awards	1995	Album Daesang (Grand Prize)	Won	
KBS Music Awards	1995	Daesang (Grand Prize)	Won	
Korean Song Awards	1995	Bright Song Award	Won	

=== Critic lists ===
Publication	List	Ranking	Year published
MBC Radio	Top 100 Korean Songs of All Time	No order	1995
MBC Radio	Best Korean Albums of All Time	No order	2001
Gallup Korea	Top 100 favorite Korean songs of all time	7	2006
Mnet	Legend 100 Songs	No order	2014
Music Y	120 Greatest Dance Songs of All Time	2	2014
Melon	Top 100 Korean Albums of All Time	88	2018

== Track listing ==
All tracks are written by Kim Chang-hwan.

Wrongful Meeting track listing
No.	Title	Music	Arrangement	Length
1.	"A Beautiful Farewell" (아름다운 이별)	Kim Hyeong-seok	Kim Hyeong-seok	4:10
2.	"Drama" (드라마)	Kim Chang-hwan	Kim Gun-mo	4:20
3.	"After Tonight" (이 밤이 가면)	Cheon Seong-il	Kim Woo-jin	4:15
4.	"To You" (너에게 (마음으로 하는 말))	Cheon Seong-il	Kim Woo-jin	3:56
5.	"After I Met You" (너를 만난 후로)	Kim Chang-hwan	Kim Gun-mo	4:34
6.	"Wrongful Meeting" (잘못된 만남)	Kim Chang-hwan	Kim Woo-jin	4:18
7.	"Better Goodbye" (멋있는 이별을 위해)	Cheon Seong-il	Kim Woo-jin	3:57
8.	"When the Winter Comes" (겨울이 오면)	Kim Chang-hwan	Kim Gun-mo	4:33
9.	"Friend? My Lover!" (넌 친구? 난 연인!)	Kim Gun-mo	Kim Woo-jin	4:30
10.	"With You" (그대와 함께)	Cheon Seong-il	Kim Woo-jin	4:12
11.	"When the Winter Comes" (겨울이 오면; bonus track)	Cheon Seong-il	Kim Woo-jin	4:40
Total length:				47:25

== See also ==
- List of best-selling albums in South Korea
