= Jo Kwan-woo =

South Korean singer and actor (born 1965)

Jo Kwan-Woo
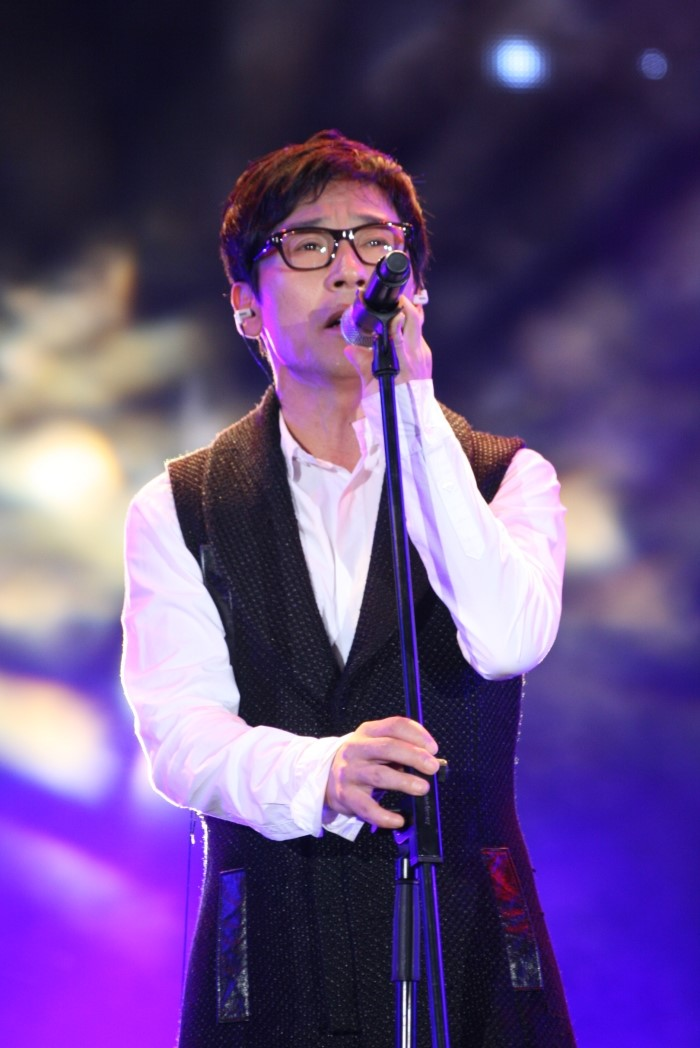
- Jo in 2012
- Born: August 3, 1965 (age 61); South Korea
- Occupations: Singer; actor
- Years active: 1994–present
- Father: Jo Tong-dal

Korean name
- Hangul: 조광호
- RR: Jo Gwangho
- MR: Cho Kwangho

Stage name
- Hangul: 조관우
- RR: Jo Gwanu
- MR: Cho Kwanu

Jo Kwan-woo (Korean: 조관우; born August 3, 1965) is a South Korean singer and actor. He debuted as a singer in 1994 and experienced great success with his second album, 1995's Memory, which sold 3 million copies and is considered one of the best albums of the 1990s by South Korean music critics. He has released nine full-length albums over the course of his career.

== Personal life ==
Jo's father is Jo Tong-dal, who is a pansori singer.

== Discography ==
=== Studio albums ===
Title	Album details	Peak chart positions	Sales
Title	Album details	KOR	Sales
My First Story	Released: October 1994; Label: Hanguk Albums; Format: CD, cassette	No data	KOR: 1,000,000+
Memory	Released: November 1995; Label: Doremi Records; Format: CD, cassette	No data	KOR: 3,000,000+
My Third Story About...	Released: November 22, 1996; Label: Doremi Records; Format: CD, cassette	No data	KOR: 1,300,000+
Waiting	Released: November 22, 1997; Label: Cream Records; Format: CD, cassette	No data	KOR: 1,000,000+
Paradise Lost (실락원)	Released: December 1, 1999; Label: Cream Records; Format: CD, cassette	5	KOR: 131,078+
Jo Kwanwoo #6	Released: January 30, 2001; Label: Universal Music; Format: CD, cassette	5	KOR: 105,555+
My Memories 2	Released: May 28, 2002; Label: Universal Music; Format: CD, cassette	18	KOR: 64,917+
Impression	Released: March 7, 2003; Label: Sky Entertainment; Format: CD, cassette	10	KOR: 30,645+
Begin Again	Released: March 17, 2018; Label: Sogno Entertainment; Format: CD, digital download	68	—N/a

== Filmography ==
=== Television show ===
- 2011: Sunday Night: "Our Night"
- 2011: Living Among the Rich
- 2016: King of Mask Singer

=== Film ===
- 2015: Detective K: Secret of the Lost Island
- 2018: Keys to the Heart
