= Byun Jin-sub =

South Korean singer

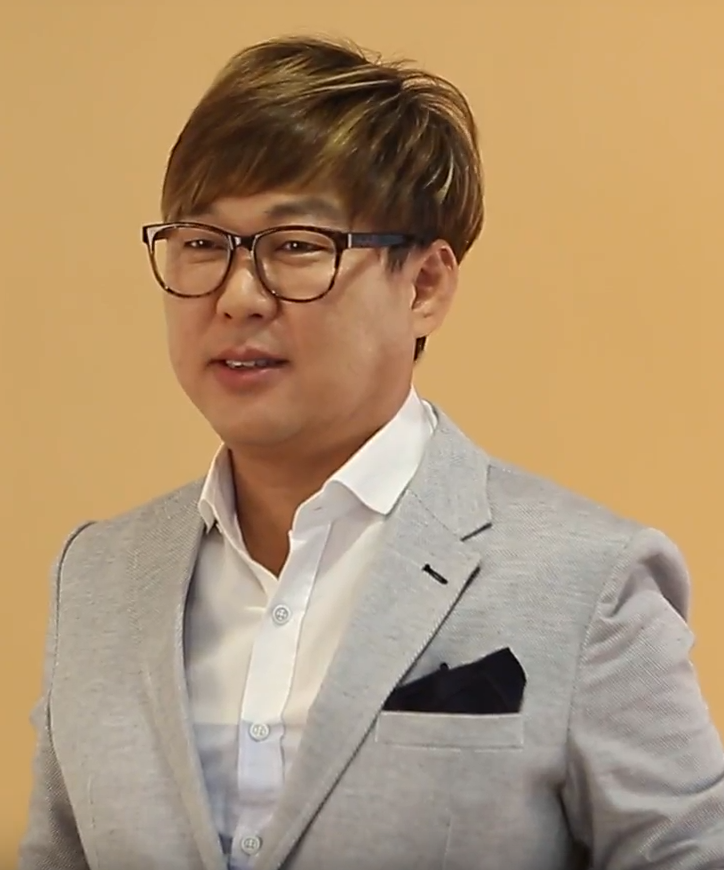
- Byun in 2017

Background information
- Born: July 30, 1966 (age 59); South Korea
- Genres: Pop
- Occupations: Singer
- Years active: 1987-present

Korean name
- Hangul: 변진섭
- Hanja: 卞眞燮
- RR: Byeon Jinseop
- MR: Pyŏn Chinsŏp

Byun Jin-sub (Korean: 변진섭; born May 19, 1966) is a South Korean singer.

== Discography ==
=== Studio albums ===
Title	Album details	Peak chart positions	Sales
Title	Album details	KOR	Sales
To Be Alone (홀로 된다는 것)	Released: June 15, 1988; Label: Ssangyong; Format: LP record	No data	KOR: 1,800,000+
Back to You (너에게로 또다시)	Released: October 25, 1989; Label: Ssangyong; Format: LP record	No data	KOR: 2,000,000+
Farewell (어떤 이별)	Released: November 24, 1990; Label: Sinseon; Format: LP record	No data	KOR: 1,200,000+
The Reason to Be With You (너와 함께 있는 이유)	Released: October 30, 1991; Label: Seoul Records Inc.; Format: LP record	No data	No data
You to Me, Again (그대 내게 다시)	Released: November 1, 1992; Label: Seoul Records Inc.; Format: CD	No data	No data
Image '94	Released: September 1, 1994; Label: Seoul Records Inc.; Format: CD	No data	No data
Again	Released: June 1, 1996; Label: Taeseong Records; Format: CD	No data	No data
Nonfiction (논픽션)	Released: March 1, 1998; Label: Yedang Records Co.; Format: CD, cassette	No data	No data
20B	Released: October 28, 1999; Label: Hakgol Music; Format: CD, cassette	41	KOR: 10,600
He'story	Released: December 23, 2004; Label: Synnara; Format: CD, cassette	—	—
Drama	Released: October 4, 2007; Label: T Entertainment; Format: CD, cassette	42	KOR: 1,543+
Timeless	Released: December 12, 2015; Label: J Entertainment; Format: CD, digital download	61	—
