= Lee Moon-sae =

South Korean singer (born 1959)

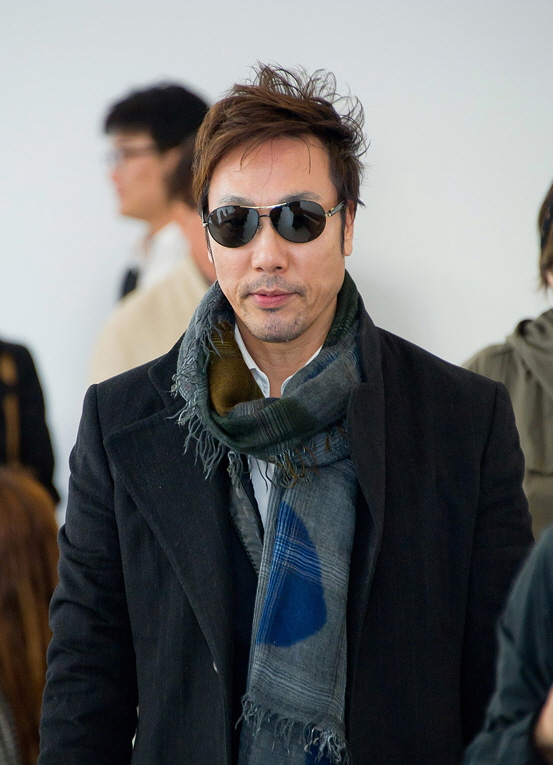
- Lee in 2011

Background information
- Born: January 17, 1959 (age 66)
- Genres: Korean ballad
- Occupation(s): Singer, songwriter, radio DJ
- Years active: 1978–present

Korean name
- Hangul: 이문세
- Hanja: 李文世
- RR: I Munse
- MR: I Munse
- IPA: iː.munse

Lee Moon-sae (Korean: 이문세; Korean pronunciation: [iː.munse]; born January 17, 1959) is a South Korean ballad singer who is often considered a Korean pop icon. Since his debut in 1978, he has released 16 full-length albums, including 1987's When Love Passes By, which sold 2.85 million copies, making it the best-selling album in South Korea to date at the time. He is also well known for being the host of the popular South Korean radio show, Starry Night, on MBC FM, from 1985 to 1996. He was diagnosed with thyroid cancer in 2007.

== Discography ==
| Title | Album details | Peak chart positions | Sales |
| Title | Album details | KOR | Sales |
|---|---|---|---|
| I Am a Happy Man (나는 행복한 사람) | Released: July 20, 1983; Label: Seorabeol Records; Format: LP | No data | |
| The Best | Released: September 1, 1984; Label: Hyundai Acoustics; Format: LP | No data | |
| I Don't Know Yet (난 아직 모르잖아요) | Released: November 20, 1985; Label: King Records; Format: LP | No data | KOR: 1,500,000+ |
| When Love Passes By (사랑이 지나가면) | Released: March 10, 1987; Label: King Records; Format: LP | No data | KOR: 2,850,000+ |
| Standing Under the Shade of a Roadside Tree (가로수 그늘아래서면) | Released: September 15, 1988; Label: King Records; Format: LP | No data | KOR: 2,580,000+ |
| That Was Me (그게 나였어) | Released: November 1, 1989; Label: King Records; Format: LP | No data | |
| Old Love (옛사랑) | Released: September 17, 1991; Label: Hankook Record Co.; Format: CD, cassette | No data | |
| Like an Old Photograph (오래된 사진처럼) | Released: September 1, 1993; Label: Orange Popular; Format: CD, cassette | No data | |
| 95 Stage With Composer Lee Younghun | Released: January 1, 1995; Label: Nice Popular; Format: CD, cassette | No data | |
| Dancing Flower (화무; 花舞) | Released: January 1, 1996; Label: M Project; Format: CD, cassette | No data | |
| Sometimes | Released: March 28, 1998; Label: King Records; Format: CD, cassette | No data | KOR: 89,302+ |
| Phew - People, Trees and Rest (휴 - 사람과 나무 그리고 쉼) | Released: October 1, 1999; Label: M Project; Format: CD, cassette | 6 | KOR: 137,011+ |
| Chapter 13 | Released: March 21, 2001; Label: EnterOne; Format: CD, cassette | 14 | KOR: 48,505+ |
| Red Underwear (빨간 내복) | Released: October 16, 2002; Label: M Project, BMG Korea; Format: CD, cassette | 15 | KOR: 48,768+ |
| New Direction | Released: April 7, 2015; Label: KMOONfnd, LOEN Entertainment; Format: CD, Digital download | 5 | KOR: 11,949+ |
| Between Us | Released: October 23, 2018; Label: KMOONfnd, kakao M; Format: CD, Digital download | 23 | KOR: 1,594+ |

== Awards ==
Name of the award ceremony, year presented, category, nominee of the award, and the result of the nomination
| Award | Year | Category | Nominee/Nominated work | Result | Ref. |
|---|---|---|---|---|---|
| Golden Disc Awards | 1986 | Main Prize | I Don't Know Yet | Won | |
| Golden Disc Awards | 1987 | Album of the Year (Daesang) | When Love Passes By | Won | |
| Golden Disc Awards | 1987 | Main Prize (Bonsang) | When Love Passes By | Won | |
| Golden Disc Awards | 1988 | Main Prize (Bonsang) | Standing Under the Shade of a Roadside Tree | Won | |
| Golden Disc Awards | 1993 | Main Prize (Bonsang) | Like an Old Photograph | Won | |
| MBC Drama Awards | 1985 | Excellence Award in Radio | Starry Night | Won | |
| MBC Drama Awards | 1987 | Top Excellence Award in Radio | Starry Night | Won | |
| MBC Drama Awards | 1993 | Best TV Host Award | Sunday Sunday Night | Won | |
| MBC Drama Awards | 2008 | Top Excellence Award in Radio | This Is Lee Moon-sae in the Morning | Won | |
| SBS Gayo Daejeon | 2005 | Live Performance Award | Lee Moon-sae | Won | |

== Broadcasting ==
| Year | Work |
|---|---|
| 1981 | KBS TV <Run Broadcasting Car> MC |
