= 015B =

South Korean music duo

- Origin: South Korea
- Genres: Pop; pop ballad; synth-pop; electronica; r&b; hip hop
- Years active: 1990–present
- Label: the015B
- Members: Jeong Seok-won; Jang Ho-il
- Past members: Jo Hyeong-gon
- Website: www.015b.kr

Korean name
- Hangul: 공일오비
- Hanja: 空一烏飛
- RR: Gongirobi
- MR: Kongirobi

015B (Korean: 공일오비) is a South Korean music producer group that debuted in 1990 and went on to become one of the country's most popular acts of the early 1990s. The group name translates literally to "A crow flies across the sky." It currently consists of brothers Jeong Seok-won and Jang Ho-il, and is known for its "guest singer system," as the group has never had a permanent lead vocalist. The group has experimented with many music genres including pop, pop ballads, synth-pop, electronica, r&b and hip hop.

== Discography ==
=== Studio albums ===
Title	Album details	Peak chart positions	Sales
Title	Album details	KOR	Sales
015B	Released: July 1990; Label: Jigu Records; Format: LP	No data	KOR: 200,000+
Second Episode	Released: July 1991; Label: Jigu Records; Format: LP	No data	KOR: 500,000+
The Third Wave	Released: August 1992; Label: Daeyoung A/V; Format: CD	No data	KOR: 1,000,000+
The Fourth Movement	Released: August 1993; Label: Daeyoung A/V; Format: CD	No data	KOR: 1,000,000+
Big 5	Released: November 1994; Label: Daeyoung A/V; Format: CD	No data	KOR: 1,000,000+
The Sixth Sense	Released: May 1996; Label: LG Media; Format: CD	No data	KOR: 300,000+
Lucky 7	Released: August 2006; Label: Manwoldang; Format: CD	—	—N/a
Yearbook 2018	Released: February 27, 2019; Label: the015B; Format: CD, digital download	60	—N/a
Yearbook 2019	Released: February 27, 2020; Label: the015B; Format: CD, digital download	84	—N/a
Yearbook 2020	Released: February 25, 2021; Label: the015B; Format: CD, digital download	—	—N/a
Yearbook 2021	Released: February 24, 2022; Label: the015B; Format: CD, digital download|	—	—N/a
Yearbook 2022	Released: February 28, 2023; Label: the015B; Format: CD, digital download	—	—N/a
Yearbook 2023	Released: February 28, 2024; Label: the015B; Format: CD, digital download	—	—N/a
"—" denotes release did not chart.

=== Compilation albums ===
Title	Album details	Peak chart positions	Sales
Title	Album details	KOR	Sales
Live	Live album; Released: January 1992; Label: Jigu Records; Format: CD	No data	No data
Strikes Back	Live album; Released: April 1994; Label: Daeyoung A/V; Format: CD	No data	No data
The Best Collection	Released: March 1996; Label: Daeyoung A/V; Format: CD	No data	No data
Final Fantasy	Released: May 2006; Label: Manwoldang; Format: CD	—	—N/a
Anthology	Remake album; Released: April 16, 2018; Label: MCC Entertainment; Format: CD, digital download	—	—N/a
"—" denotes release did not chart.

=== Extended plays ===
Title	Album details	Peak chart positions	Sales
Title	Album details	KOR	Sales
20th Century Boy	Released: June 22, 2011; Label: Pony Canyon; Format: CD, digital download	10	KOR: 1,743+
Let Me Go (Remixes)	Released: June 27, 2012; Label: MCC Entertainment; Format: digital download	—	

== Awards and nominations ==
Year	Award	Category	Nominated work	Result	Ref.
1992	Golden Disc Awards	Album Bonsang (Main Prize)	The Third Wave	Won	
1993	Golden Disc Awards	Album Bonsang (Main Prize)	The Fourth Movement	Won	
