= Shin Seung-hun =

South Korean singer

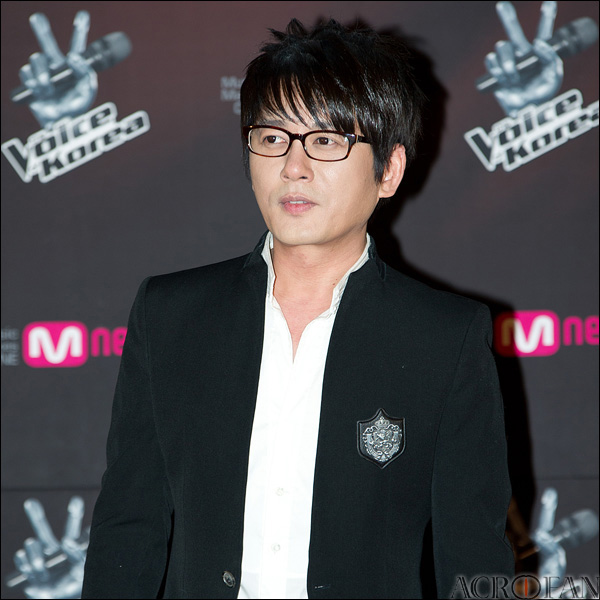
- Shin in 2012

Background information
- Born: 1966 (age 59–60); Daejeon, South Korea
- Genres: K-pop, ballad
- Occupation: Singer-songwriter
- Instruments: Guitar, piano, vocals
- Years active: 1990–present
- Label: Dorothy Company

Korean name
- Hangul: 신승훈
- RR: Sin Seunghun
- MR: Sin Sŭnghun

Shin Seung-hun (Korean: 신승훈; born 1966) is a South Korean singer-songwriter who was known in the 1990s as the "Emperor of Ballads". He debuted in 1990 with the hit song, "Reflection of You in Your Smile", and has since released 12 studio albums. Before 2020, he held the record for the most albums sold by one artist in South Korea with 17 million albums sold over his career.

== Discography ==
=== Studio albums ===
Title	Album details	Peak chart positions	Sales
Title	Album details	KOR	Sales
Reflection of You in Your Smile (미소속에 비친 그대)	Released: 1 November 1990; Label: Dukyun Industries; Format: LP; Track listing: 1. Reflection Of You In Your Smile; 2. Second Love; 3. I Like Weather Like Today; 4. I Love Her; 5. Look Back; 6. Your Mind; 7. Missing You; 8. Goodbye My Love; 9. Reflection Of You In Your Smile; 10. Look Back	No data	KOR: 1,400,000+
Invisible Love (보이지 않는 사랑)	Released: 30 November 1991; Label: Dukyun Industries; Format: LP; Track listing: 1. Invisible Love; 2. Eternal Love; 3. Autumn Memories; 4. By Chance; 5. Me Inside The Mirror; 6. Just Today; 7. Easy Breakup; 8. Into The Sunlight; 9. After Tonight; 10. By Chance - Remix Ver.; 11. Don’t Make Me Cry; 12. Reflection Of You In Your Smile	No data	KOR: 1,580,000+
Because I Love You (널 사랑하니까)	Released: 15 April 1993; Label: Dukyun Industries; Format: LP	No data	KOR: 1,700,000+
After A Long Time (그후로 오랫동안)	Released: 15 September 1994; Label: Dukyun Industries; Format: CD; Track listing: 1. Intro (Prolouge: With You In The Rain); 2. After A Long Time; 3. Feeling Love; 4. Letting You Go; 5. When Tomorrow Comes; 6. My Way Of Goodbye; 7. Long After; 8. Transformation; 9. Misconception; 10. Sad Love; 11. Romeo And Juilet	No data	KOR: 1,800,000+
To Heaven (나보다 조금 더 높은곳에 니가 있을뿐)	Released: 1 May 1996; Label: Line Acoustic Co.; Format: CD	No data	KOR: 2,470,000+
Shin Seung Hun VI	Released: 1 February 1998; Label: Line Acoustic Co.; Format: CD	No data	KOR: 1,310,000+
Desire To Fly High	Released: 14 March 2000; Label: Universal Music Korea; Format: CD, cassette	1	KOR: 492,931+
The Shin Seung Hun	Released: 14 January 2002; Label: Daeyeong AV; Format: CD, cassette	1	KOR: 410,666+
Ninth Reply	Released: 2 February 2004; Label: Dorothy Music; Format: CD, cassette	1	KOR: 232,927+
The Romanticist	Released: 10 October 2006; Label: Dorothy Music; Format: CD, cassette, digital download; Track listing: 1. Dream Of My Life; 2. 송연비가 ('인연을 보내는 슬픈 노래'); 3. Lady (무궁화 꽃이 또...피었습니다); 4. 시가을 뒤로 걸어; 5. 지금 만나러 갑니다; 6. 못된 기다림; 7. 그런가요; 8. I Luv U I Luv U I Luv U 9. 아파도, 그래도...; 10. 그랬죠 (Song for Mother); 11. 로미오 & 줄리엣 2; 12. 이다선가 그녀에게 무슨 일이 생기면; 13. Wonderful World; 14. 어떡하죠 (From 천국의 나무); 15. 그래도 사랑이다 (From 이 죽일 놈의...)	4	KOR: 137,207+
I Am...& I Am	Released: 10 November 2015; Label: Dorothy Music; Format: CD, digital download; Track listing: 1. Me, Myself; 2. Walk With..... (feat. Kim Ko-eun); 3. Unsaid Love; 4. Amigo; 5. Would You Marry Me; 6. I Will; 7. Mayo (feat. Beenzino); 8. Love Again; 9. Hello, Hello, Hello; 10. Time Is Mine; 11. Interstellar; 12. Would You Marry Me: Neo Version	5	KOR: 13,335+
My Personas	Released: 8 April 2020; Label: Dorothy Music; Format: CD, digital download, streaming; Track listing: 1. Like The First Goodbye; 2. Memories of You; 3. In November; 4. To Me; 5. Been There, Done That; 6. Walking In The Rain; 7. Love Makes Me Grown Up; 8. Lullaby - Orchestra Version	12	KOR: 10,500
Sincerely Melodies	Released: 23 September 2025; Label: Dorothy Music; Format: CD, LP, digital download, streaming	31	KOR: 8,181

== Awards and nominations ==
=== Golden Disc Awards ===
Year	Category	Work	Result	Ref.
1991	Album Bonsang	Reflection of You in Your Smile	Won	
1992	Album of the Year	Invisible Love	Won	
1992	Album Bonsang	Invisible Love	Won	
1993	Album of the Year	Because I Love You	Won	
1993	Album Bonsang	Because I Love You	Won	
1994	Album Bonsang	After A Long Time	Won	
1996	Album Bonsang	To Heaven	Won	
1998	Album Bonsang	Shin Seung Hun VI	Won	
2000	Album Bonsang	Desire To Fly High	Won	
2002	Album Bonsang	The Shin Seung Hun	Won	
2004	Album Bonsang	Ninth Reply	Won	
2006	Album Bonsang	The Romanticist	Won	

=== Mnet Asian Music Awards ===
Year	Category	Work	Result	Ref.
2000	Best Male Artist	"The Unwritten Legend"	Won	
2000	Best Ballad Performance	"After Separation"	Nominated	
2002	Best Male Artist	"If We Can Part Even Though We Love"	Nominated	
2002	Special Jury Prize	"If We Can Part Even Though We Love"	Won	
2004	Best Ballad Video	"When That Day Comes"	Won	
2008	Mnet PD's Choice Award	—N/a	Won	

== See also ==
- List of best-selling albums in South Korea
