= Kim Jong-seo (musician) =

South Korean rock musician (born 1965)

Kim Jong-Seo
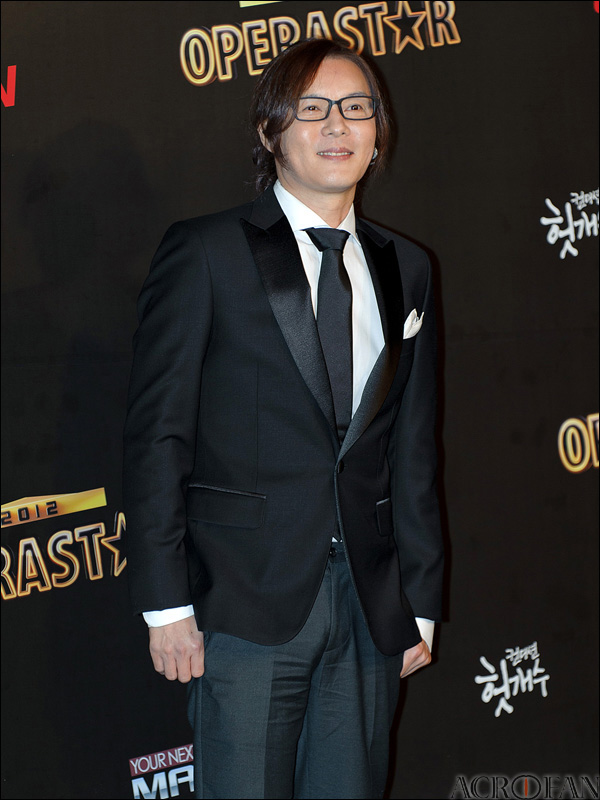
- Kim in 2012

Background information
- Origin: South Korea
- Genres: Rock, heavy metal
- Occupations: Singer; musician
- Instruments: Vocals
- Years active: 1985–present
- Label: NH Media
- Website: nhemg.com

Kim Jong-Seo (Korean: 김종서; born 23 February 1965) is a South Korean rock musician. He debuted in 1985 as part of the band Boohwal. After Boohwal, Kim Jong-Seo was part of several rock bands, among others: Sinawe, Charisma (카리스마), and Little Sky (작은 하늘). He has been a solo act since 1992, which saw the release of his first solo album Rethona. He contributed to the first, second and fourth albums by Seo Taiji and Boys.

He has released 19 solo albums, and is also Seoul's Ambassador for Environment. His single, "Star's Story" (별 이야기) talks about how we used to be able to see stars at night, but not anymore in big cities. Through this song which was jointly produced with another former member of Buhwal, he calls for people to return the clean environment to our next generation. He was also invited to perform in United Nations Anniversary on 23 June 2009 in New York City.

== Albums ==
Rethona (1992)

1. 대답없는 너
2. 주머니 속의 행복 ("Happiness in the Pocket")
3. 내앞에선 너에게 ("In Front of Me, for You")
4. 내 기다림의 시작 ("The Start of My Waiting")
5. 지금은 알 수 없어 ("Can't Know for Now")
6. 따스한 봄날까지
7. 숨겼던 눈물로 ("Hidden Tears")
8. 사랑을 한 후에 사랑은

20th Anniversary Greatest Hits (2007)

1. "I Love You"
2. 대답없는 너 ("You Without Respond")
3. 겨울비 (W"inter Rain")
4. 지금은 알 순 없어 ("I Don't Know Yet")
5. 남겨진 독백 ("Left Soliloquy")
6. 아름다운 구속 ("Beautiful Restriction")
7. "Epilogue"
8. "Love Song"
9. 별 ("Star")
10. "Corea"
11. 세상밖으로 ("Out of the World")
12. 내앞에선 너에게 ("In Front of Me, for You")
13. "Starry Night"
14. 영원 ("Forever")
15. 세상 밖으로 ("Out of the World")
16. 겨울비 ("Winter Rain")
17. "Love Song"

Father (아버지) (October 2008)

1. "R.I.D.E"
2. "Father" (아버지)
3. "I Love You"
4. "Father" (instrumental)

Star's Story (별 이야기) (September 2009, single)

1. "Star's Story" (별 이야기)
2. "Star's Story" (instrumental)

== Awards ==
=== Mnet Asian Music Awards ===
Year	Category	Work	Result
1999	Best Rock Performance	Broken Hearted"	Nominated
