= Kyunghyang Shinmun =

South Korean daily newspaper

- Type: Daily newspaper
- Format: Broadsheet
- Owner(s): Kyunghyang, Co.
- Editor: Jo Ho-yeon
- Founded: 6 October 1946
- Political alignment: Centre to centre-left Liberalism (South Korean); Historical (1966 – 1998): Conservatism (South Korean); Anti-communism; Pro-military
- Language: Korean
- Headquarters: Seoul, South Korea
- Circulation: 350,000
- Website: khan.co.kr

Korean name
- Hangul: 경향신문
- Hanja: 京鄕新聞
- RR: Gyeonghyang sinmun
- MR: Kyŏnghyang sinmun

The Kyunghyang Shinmun (Korean: 경향신문) is a major daily newspaper published in South Korea. It is based in Seoul. The name literally means Urbi et Orbi Daily News.

== History ==
Kyunghyang Shinmun was founded in 1946 by the Catholic Church, which explains its name. Before the Korean War, it was edited by Fr. Peter Ryang, a refugee from the North, and its circulation was 100,000. Kyunghyang Shinmun was temporarily closed down in May 1959 by the Rhee administration on grounds of having printed "false editorials", but revived after the pro-democracy April Revolution of 1960. The newspaper is no longer associated with the Catholic Church.

In the mid-late 1950s, it applied for a commercial television license. The plan was likely discarded.

In 1974, Kyunghyang Shinmun joined forces with Munhwa Broadcasting Corporation (MBC), thus forming the new Munhwa Broadcasting-Kyunghyang Shinmun Company. The partnership lasted until 1981, when the two companies were separated due to the Basic Press Act.

It later came to be owned by the Hanwha chaebol in 1990, but Hanwha relinquished its control of the newspaper after the 1997 Asian financial crisis, at the same time as Hanhwa's competitor Hyundai gave up its own daily, the Munhwa Ilbo.

== Current operations ==
In 1998, Kyunghyang Shinmun became an independent newspaper with employee ownership. The CEO is elected by the employees; the editor-in-chief, though appointed by the CEO, must be approved by a majority of the journalist-employees.

The newspaper employs 600 people, including 240 journalists and maintains foreign bureaus in Washington, D.C., Tokyo and Beijing. It reports 1.3 million daily visitors to its website and 6.2 million daily page-views. The company also publishes a daily sports newspaper (Sports Kyunghyang), a weekly news magazine (The Jugan Kyunghyang) and a monthly lifestyle magazine for women (The Lady Kyunghyang).

The Hankyoreh and Kyunghyang Shinmun are generally considered "liberal" or "moderate progressive".

== See also ==
- List of newspapers in South Korea
