= 20th Century Hit Song =

- Promotional poster
- Genre: Music
- Starring: Kim Hee-chul; Mijoo; Lee Dong-geun
- Opening theme: NRG - "Hit Song"
- Country of origin: South Korea
- Original language: Korean

Production
- Running time: 60 minutes
- Production company: KBS N

Original release
- Network: KBS Joy, KBS2, DRAMAcube, FashioN
- Release: March 27, 2020 – present

20th Century Hit Song (Korean: 이십세기 힛-트쏭) is a South Korean television music program that blends nostalgia for Generation X with curiosity for Generation MZ. The show explores iconic hit songs from the past, showcasing the style, trends, and cultural significance of 20th-century Korean pop music.

"20th Century Hit Songs" is a newtro concept music chart show that fosters a bridge between the youth of the past, who were trendsetters and pioneers, and today's youth, who continue to connect with the nostalgia and creativity of the 20th century. The program offers an engaging way for different generations to come together and celebrate the music that defined a cultural movement.

The show airs on airs on KBS Joy on Friday at 20:30 (KST).

== Broadcast timeline ==
Channel	Period	Time (KST)
KBS Joy	March 27, 2020 – present	Friday 8:30 PM – 9:20 PM

== Format ==
In each episode, viewers are taken on a "time machine" journey back to the past, reconstructing the songs that shaped an era. The show highlights the music, history, and impact of K-pop, while also appealing to younger generations who are drawn to the unique and retro charm of that time.

== Host ==
Name	Duration	Notes
Kim Hee-chul	Ep. 1 - present	An 'undisputed human jukebox' who knows every song, 20th Century Hit Song' is the essence of Kim Heechul himself. If you're curious about 20th-century K-pop, please check out Heechul Encyclopedia "I'll show you the charm of old K-pop"
Lee Mi-joo	Ep. 220 - present	Don't tease her for being young~ She's a 90s kid, but she's fully immersed in that old-school vibe! As you listen, you'll recognize so many songs "Even the MZ generation loves old K-pop''
Lee Dong-geun	Ep. 125 - present	His main job is as a KBS N Sports announcer, but here he's the one and only 'Geuni Geuni Donggeuni~' His hobby is solitary dance, and his special skill is playing the melodica ''Leave the hidden songs to me!''
Kim Min-ah	Ep. 1 - 197	

== List of episodes ==
- Note that the show airs on a cable channel (pay TV), which plays part in its slower uptake and relatively small audience share when compared to programs broadcast (FTA) on public networks such as KBS, SBS, MBC or EBS.
- NR rating means "not reported". The rating is low.
- In the ratings below, the highest rating for the show will be in red each year.

=== 2020 ===
List of episodes in 2020 (episode 1–40)

Episodes	Broadcast Date	Guest(s)	1st Ranking Track	Rating
1	March 27, 2020	Space A (Kim Hyun-jung, Jason)	Koyote - "Pure Love"	NR
2	April 3, 2020	Young Turks Club (Choi Seung-min, Park Sung-hyun, Han Hyun-nam)	Young Turks Club - "Strangers"	NR
3	April 10, 2020	Indigo (Kwak Seung-nam, Kim Dae-jin)	015B - "Very Old Couples"	NR
4	April 17, 2020	Han Jung-soo (Timur Demix)	Baby Vox - "Killer"	NR
5	April 24, 2020	Clon	Clon - "First love"	NR
6	May 1, 2020	Ha.E.D	Kim Hyun-jung - "Goodbye to her"	0.495%
7	May 8, 2020	Pearl	H.O.T. - "Hope"	NR
8	May 15, 2020	Park Mi-kyung	Park Mi-kyung - "Eve's Warning"	NR
9	May 22, 2020	Wax	Yoon Jong-shin - "That Day Long Ago"	NR
10	May 29, 2020	Sung Dae-hyun	Roo'ra - "The Angel Who Lost Wings"	NR
11	June 5, 2020	Lee Ji-hoon	DJ DOC - "Murphy's law"	NR
12	June 12, 2020	Kim Jung-min	J. Y. Park - "Proposal Song"	NR
13	June 19, 2020	Hyun Jin-young	Turbo - "My Childhood Dream"	NR
14	June 26, 2020	Kwon Seon-gook	Shin Seung-hun - "I Believe"	NR
15	July 3, 2020	Lee Hyun-woo	Yang Hee-eun - "Evergreen Tree"	NR
16	July 10, 2020	Lee Soo-young	Kim Kwang-seok - "With the Heart to Forget You"	NR
17	July 17, 2020	Roo'ra (Lee Sang-min, Kim Ji-hyun, Chae Ri-na)	Roo'ra - "3! 4!"	NR
18	July 24, 2020	Geum Bi (Turtles)	Deux - "In Summer"	NR
19	July 31, 2020	Cho Jin-soo	Brown Eyes - "Already One Year"	NR
20	August 7, 2020	Kim Jang-hoon	DJ DOC - "Summer Story"	NR
21	August 14, 2020	KCM	Jo Kwan-woo - "Swamp"	NR
22	August 21, 2020	DJ DOC	DJ DOC - "Dance With DOC"	0.522%
23	August 28, 2020	Yoon Yeo-kyu	Kim Sang-min - "You"	0.434%
24	September 4, 2020	No guests	Shin Hae-chul - "Don't Be Sad"	0.482%
25	September 11, 2020	Go Jae-geun (Y2K)	Y2K - "After Breaking Up"	0.4%
26	September 18, 2020	Sung Jin-woo	Sechs Kies - "School Anthem"	NR
27	September 25, 2020	Joo Young-hoon	Im Chang-jung - "Again"	0.556%
28	October 2, 2020	Tae Jin-ah	Tae Jin-ah - "I'm Sorry I'm Sorry"	0.380%
29	October 9, 2020	Yang Dong-geun	Kim Hee-ae - "Please Don't Forget Me"	0.470%
30	October 16, 2020	Kim Myung-ki	Boohwal - "Lonely Night"	0.482%
31	October 23, 2020	No guests	Exhibition - "Etude of Memories"	0.437%
32	October 30, 2020	No guests	Cool - "The Reason I Wanted You"	0.429%
33	November 6, 2020	Eru	Eru - "Black Glasses"	0.367%
34	November 13, 2020	No guests	Shin Sung-woo - "Towards Tomorrow"	0.369%
35	November 20, 2020	Lee Hye-young (voice appearance through phone)	Deux - "Come Back To Me"	0.477%
36	November 27, 2020	Lim Jeong-hee	Lim Jeong-hee - "Music Is My Life"	NR
37	December 4, 2020	Seo In-young	Jewelry - "Again"	NR
38	December 11, 2020	No guests	Ryu - "From the Beginning Till Now"	0.467%
39	December 18, 2020	Jung Sung-ho	—N/a (Note: The episode's theme is songs which received the Grand Award at the KBS Music Awards throughout the 1990s, introduced in chronological order.)	0.397%
40	December 25, 2020	Mr.2	Park Hyo-shin - "Snow Flower"	0.535%

=== 2021 ===
List of episodes in 2021 (episode 41–93)

Episodes	Broadcast Date	Guest(s)	1st Ranking Track	Rating
41	January 1, 2021	No guests	H.O.T. - "We Are The Future"	0.564%
42	January 8, 2021	No Min-hyuk (Click-B) (Voice appearance through phone)	NEXT - "Here, I Stand For You"	0.445%
43	January 15, 2021	No guests	Panic - "Nobody"	0.571%
44	January 22, 2021	No guests	Baby V.O.X - "Get Up"	0.548%
45	January 29, 2021	No guests	Park Hyo-shin - "Snow Flower"	0.368%
46	February 5, 2021	Jung Jae-wook	Jo Sung-mo - "Immortal Love"	0.271%
47	February 12, 2021	Jung Sung-ho, Park Seul-gi	Kim Hyun-chul & Lee So-ra - "The Blue in You"	0.306%
48	February 19, 2021	No guests	O.P.P.A - "Patriotism"	0.350%
49	February 26, 2021	Tei	SG Wannabe - "Timeless"	0.368%
50	March 5, 2021	Lee Jae-min	Lee Jung-hyun - "Give To You"	0.404%
51	March 12, 2021	Chae Eun-jung	Fin.K.L - "Now"	0.288%
52	March 19, 2021	Seo Hyun-ho (Note: Pump It Up professional player)	Novasonic - "Another Truth"	0.226%
53	March 26, 2021	No guests	R.ef - "Brilliant Love"	0.420%
54	April 2, 2021	Hong Young-joo	Park Jin-young - "Don't Leave Me"	0.461%
55	April 9, 2021	Kim Kyung-ho	Lee Seung-chul - "Don't Say Goodbye"	0.411%
56	April 16, 2021	Bobby Kim, Bryn	Seo Taiji and Boys - "Come Back Home"	0.246%
57	April 23, 2021	Lee Ye-rin	Insooni - "Night After Night"	0.481%
58	April 30, 2021	Lee Ki-chan	H.O.T. - "Warrior's Descendant"	0.231%
59	May 7, 2021	Yurisangja	Yurisangja - "Can I Love You?"	0.230%
60	May 14, 2021	Lee Sung-wook (R.ef)	Deux - "Break off the Yoke"	0.254%
61	May 21, 2021	Kim Jang-hoon	Kim Jang-hoon - "If You're Like Me"	0.314%
62	May 28, 2021	Kim Hyun-jung (Space A)	Roo'ra - "Couple"	0.577%
63	June 4, 2021	No guests	Seo Taiji and Boys - "Hayeoga"	0.417%
64	June 11, 2021	No guests	Roo'ra - "Pray"	0.350%
65	June 18, 2021	Jun Jin (Shinhwa)	Seo Taiji and Boys - "I Know"	0.435%
66	June 25, 2021	Kim Se-heon (Eve)	Boohwal - "Rain and Your Story"	0.432%
67	July 2, 2021	No guests	Lee Moon-sae - "Sunset Glow"	0.251%
68	July 9, 2021	No guests	Park Jin-young - "Elevator"	0.298%
69	July 16, 2021	No guests	Yoon Jong-shin - "Your Wedding"	0.281%
70	July 23, 2021	Yoon Il-sang, Kim Jong-kook (voice appearance through phone)	Young Turks Club - "Affection"	0.325%
71	July 30, 2021	No guests	Seo Taiji and Boys - "Regret of the Times"	0.512%
72	August 6, 2021	No guests	Cho Yong-pil - "A Friend"	0.427%
73	August 13, 2021	Shin Chul	Cherry Filter - "Romantic Cat"	0.443%
74	August 20, 2021	No guests	Im Chang-jung - "Already To Me"	0.772%
75	August 27, 2021	No guests	Cho Yong-pil - "Dream"	0.439%
76	September 3, 2021	No guests	Boohwal - "The More I Love"	0.435%
77	September 10, 2021	No guests	Lee Hyo-ri - "Hey Girl"	0.383%
78	September 17, 2021	Lee Hong-gi (F.T. Island), Hong Ji-yun	Bank - "Can't Have You"	0.459%
79	September 24, 2021	No guests	Cho Yong-pil - "I Wish It Could Be That Way Now"	0.520%
80	October 1, 2021	Joo Young-hoon	Uhm Jung-hwa - "Poison"	0.489%
81	October 8, 2021	No guests	Shin Seung-hun - "Invisible Love"	0.411%
82	October 15, 2021	No guests	Jo Sung-mo - "To Heaven"	0.231%
83	October 22, 2021	No guests	Crying Nut - "Let's Run"	0.445%
84	October 29, 2021	No guests	Seo Taiji and Boys - "Come Back Home"	0.362%
85	November 5, 2021	Lady Jane, Navi	—N/a (Note: The history from debut to disbandment is covered without ranking.)	0.301%
86	November 12, 2021	No guests	Seo Taiji and Boys - "Dreaming of Balhae"	0.530%
87	November 19, 2021	No guests	Park Jin-young - "Honey"	0.502%
88	November 26, 2021	No guests	Yoo Young-jin - "Your Scent"	0.416%
89	December 3, 2021	No guests	—N/a (Note: Highlights hits that ended the year at number one from 1990 to 1997 without ranking.)	0.375%
90	December 10, 2021	Kim Hyung-suk	Im Chang-jung - "Then Again"	0.482%
91	December 17, 2021	No guests	Buzz - "Thorn"	0.488%
92	December 24, 2021	No guests	Park Hyo-shin - "Snow Flower"	0.381%
93	December 31, 2021	Son Bum-soo	Lee Hyun-woo - "The Day After We Broke up"	0.640%

=== 2022 ===
List of episodes in 2022 (episode 94–145)

Episodes	Broadcast Date	Guest(s)	1st Ranking Track	Rating
94	January 7, 2022	No guests	Cho Yong-pil - "I Like You"	0.506%
95	January 14, 2022	No guests	Toy featuring Kim Yeon-woo - "Is It Still Beautiful?"	0.508%
96	January 21, 2022	No guests	Kim Hyun-chul - "Fall of the Moon"	0.446%
97	January 28, 2022	No guests	Lee Jung-hyun - "Wa"	0.406%
98	February 4, 2022	No guests	Seo Taiji and Boys - "In the Time Spent With You"	0.486%
99	February 11, 2022	No guests	Cool - "Ten Commandments"	0.396%
100	February 18, 2022	Kim Jung-min, Park Wan-kyu, Kim Jong-seo, Kim Kyung-ho	YADA - "Already Sad Love"	0.474%
101	February 25, 2022	Kim Seong-myeon (K2), Jeon In-hyuk (YADA)	YADA - "Already Sad Love"	0.742%
102	March 4, 2022	No guests	Uhm Jung-hwa - "Festival"	0.380%
103	March 11, 2022	Cho Young-soo	SG Wannabe - "My person"	0.711%
104	March 18, 2022	No guests	Im Chang-jung - "A Glass Of Soju"	0.374%
105	March 25, 2022	Kim Min-jong, Shin Seung-hun (voice appearance via phone)	Kim Min-jong - "Like A Fool"	0.400%
106	April 1, 2022	No guests	Roo'ra - "3! 4!"	0.284%
107	April 8, 2022	Honey J	Park Jin-young - "Honey"	0.334%
108	April 15, 2022	No guests	S.E.S. - "Love"	0.391%
109	April 22, 2022	No guests	Jo Kwan-woo - "Swamp"	0.319%
110	April 29, 2022	No guests	Untitle - "Wings"	0.435%
111	May 6, 2022	No guests	Jang Na-ra - "Sweet Dream" and IU - Good Day	0.281%
112	May 13, 2022	No guests	Lee Yong - "The Forgotten Season"	0.348%
113	May 27, 2022	Kim Hyun-chul	Kim Hyun-chul - "Lifetime"	0.312%
138	November 11, 2022	No guests	Clon - "Bing Bing Bing"	
139	November 18, 2022	No guests	CoCo - "Nowadays, we are"	0.321%
140	November 25, 2022	No guests	Lee Seung-gi - "Because You're My Woman"	0.286%
141	December 2, 2022	No guests	Jo Gyu-man - "I'll Give You Everything"	0.450%
142	December 9, 2022	No guests	Turbo - "December"	0.437%
143	December 16, 2022	No guests	Jo Sung-mo - "Promise"	0.248%
144	December 23, 2022	No guests	Cho Yong-pil - "Cafe of The Winter"	0.478%
145	December 30, 2022	No guests	Kim Jung-min - "Lover"	0.365%

=== 2023 ===
List of episodes in 2023 (episode 146–196)

Episodes	Broadcast Date	Guest(s)	1st Ranking Track	Rating
146	January 6, 2023	No guests	Lee Jung-hyun - "Wa"	0.477%
147	January 13, 2023	No guests	Choi Ho-sub - "When Time Passes"	0.469%
148	January 20, 2023	Seol Ha-yoon and Kim Young-chul	Cho Yong-pil - "Come Back to Busan Harbour"	0.353%
149	January 27, 2023	No guests	Cho Yong-pil - "The Empty Space"	0.341%
150	February 3, 2023	No guests	H.O.T - "Full of Happiness"	0.417%
151	February 10, 2023	No guests	Chakra - "Come A Come"	0.223%
152	February 17, 2023	No guests	Ahn Jae-wook - "Friend"	0.326%
153	February 24, 2023	No guests	Hyun Jin-young - "Sad Mannequin"	0.346%
154	March 3, 2023	No guests	Kim Gun-mo - "Wrongful Meeting"	0.527%
155	March 10, 2023	No guests	Crying Nut - "Circus Magic Clowns"	N/A
156	March 17, 2023	No guests	Clon - "Bing Bing Bing"	0.290%

Episodes	Broadcast Date	Theme	Remark (s)	Featured Hit Songs
146	January 6, 2023	Hit Song, A Singer Who Debuted In The Year Of The Rabbit At The End Of The Century, 1999	No guests	10 - Click Rate (Dreamming), 9 - Park Myung-soo (Stupid Love), 8 - Kim Sa-rang (Feeling), 7 - Seomoon Tak (Love Never Fades), 6 - Park Hyo-shin (Can't Do), 5 - Lee Soo-young (I Believe), 4 - Fly to the Sky (Day By Day), 3 - g.o.d (To Mother), 2 - Y2K (After Breaking Up), 1 - Lee Jung-hyun (And)
147	January 13, 2023	I'm not envious of ten songs, just one! The Legendary One Hit Wonder Hit-Tong	No guests	10 - Ex (I Look Forward To), 9 - Bought (Memories), 8 - Juliet (Wait Wolf), 7 - The Late Lee Won-Jin (For Lovers Who Are Starting), 6 - Bobo (A Late Regret), 5 - The Late Lim Jong-Hwan (I Walked That Day), 4 - Lee Joo-won (For The Love You Saved), 3 - Heidi (Jini), 2 - Kyuyoung Hwang (No Problem), 1 - Choi Ho-seop (As The Years Go By)
148	January 20, 2023	Trot Hit Song That Will Have The Whole Family Singing Along From The First Verse	Guest: Lee Dong-geun, Seol Ha-yoon, Kim Young-Chul	15 - Lee Hye-eun (Passion), 14 - Yoon Soo-il (Ecstatic Confession), 13 - Lee Ja-yeon (Chalang Chalang), 12 - Na Hoon-a (Mushiro), 11 - Song Dae-gwan (Four Beats), 10 - Seo Joo-kyung (A Bold Woman), 9 - Cho Yong-pil (Come Back To Busan Port), 8 - Moon Joo-ran (The Man Bothers The Woman), 7 - Kim Kook-hwan (Let'S Break The Plate Too), 5 - Sechs Kies (Road Fighter), 5 - Kim Kyung-ho (People Who Make Me Sad), 4 - Diva (Why Call), 3 - Tae Jin-ah (Samogok), 2 - Gangjin (A Cup Of Makgeolli), 1 - Na Hoon-a (Hometown Station)
149	January 27, 2023	The Legend Of The Music Industry! The Original Singer Hit Song	Special MC: Announcer Lee Ho-geun	9 - Circle (Sweetest Love), 8 - Yes Yes Yes (Amigar Restaurant), 7 - Adam (Love Out Of This World), 6 - Do Won-kyung (My Youth In The Matchbox), 5 - Kim Wan-sun (Masquerade), 4 - Lee Hye-eun (You Won't Know), 3 - Lee Sun-hee (To J), 2 - Fire Truck (Tell Her), 1 - Cho Yong-pil (Empty Space)
150	February 3, 2023	A Hit Follow-Up Song That'S As Good As The Title Song	Special MC: Announcer Lee Ho-geun	9 - Kim Jang-hoon (I Am A Man), 8 - Kim Kyung-ho (Forbidden Love), 7 - Kim Jong-seo (Beautiful Redemption), 6 - Sechs Kies (The Way To A Man), 5 - Pinocchio (Between Love And Friendship), 4 - Solid (Soul Mates), 3 - Fin.K.L (To My Boyfriend), 2 - Kim Gun-mo (Excuse), 1 - H.O.T. (Happiness),
151	February 10, 2023	Perfect! Hit-Tsong, a girl group with an unrivaled concept	No Guests	10 - Fin.K.L (Blue Rain), 9 - O24 (Freedom), 8 - Eco (Happy Me), 7 - As One (Only You Don't Know), 6 - Swi.T (I'Ll Be There), 5 - M.I.L.K. (Come To Me), 4 - Hans Band (I Love You Teacher), 3 - Diva (Okay), 2 - S.E.S. (('Cause) I'm Your Girl), 1 - Chakra (One),
152	February 17, 2023	Unity! A Hit Song For Men'S Karaoke That Calls For Friendship	No guests	10 - Boohwal (The More You Love), 9 - Tak Jae-hoon (The Path I Chose), 8 - Honey Family (Man Story), 7 - Bom Yeoreum Gaeul Kyeoul (Bravo, My Life!), 6 - Can (Springtime In My Life), 5 - Shin Sung-woo (What Can I Say Friend), 4 - Kim Min-woo (Friends Like Rest), 3 - Lim Chang-jung (A Glass Of Soju), 2 - The Blue (For Friends), 1 - Ahn Jae-wook (Friend)
153	February 24, 2023	Found A Treasure! Singer Hit-Tsong Debuted by a Singer	No guests	8 - Oryongbimubang (Bebop Bar Lula Lula), 7 - Young Turks Club (Ugly Complex), 6 - Rain (Bad Guy), 5 - Chakra (Hey U), 4 - Lee Ji-yeon (The Reason Was Pain To Me), 3 - NRG (You Can Do It), 2 - DJ DOC (Superman'S Lament), 1 - Hyun Jin-young (Sad Mannequin),
154	March 3, 2023	Did it work~! Sympathize with the XMZ generation! Hit-Tsong	No guests	10 - The Classic (Magic Castle), 9 - Cho Jeong-hyeon (I Loved You Until The Pain), 8 - Uhm Jung-hwa (Poison), 7 - S.E.S. (Dreams Come True), 6 - Yoon Jong-shin (That Day Long Ago), 5 - Kim Kyung-ho (People Who Make Me Sad), 4 - Kim Hyun-jung (Farewell To Her), 3 - The Late Kim Hyun-sik (My Love By My Side), 2 - Exhibition (Study Of Memory),
155	March 10, 2023	Sleepiness~ Go Away! A Punk Rock Hit Song That Will Overcome Spring Fatigue	No guests	10 - Witches (Open!! She!!), 9 - Lazybone (I Only Miss You), 8 - Bulldog Mansion (Destiny), 7 - Shareholder Club (Essay Love), 6 - Spooky Banana (Fireman Uncle), 5 - Dog (Kyunga's Day), 4 - No Brain (Youth 98), 3 - Pippi Band (Strawberry), 2 - Jaurim (Ha Ha Ha), 1 - Crying Nut (Circus Magic Troupe)
156	March 17, 2023	Made In Korea! 1st Generation K-Pop! Hit Song!	No guests	10 - Kim Wan-sun (Tonight), 9 - Kim Bum-soo (Day), 8 - Kim Hyun-jung (Love Alone), 7 - Shin Seung-hun (I Believe), 6 - Park Yong-ha (Like The First Day), 5 - Baby V.O.X (Killer), 4 - H.O.T. (We Are The Future), 3 - Ahn Jae-wook (Forever), 2 - BoA (No. 1), 1 - Clon (Round And Round)
157	March 24, 2023	The 3 Greatest Composers Of The 90S, Hit Song	No guests	Dance: 3 - Kim Gun-mo (First Impressions) by Kim Hyeong-seok, 2 - Turbo (Goodbye Yesterday) by Joo Young-hoon, 1 - DJ DOC (Beauty And The Beast (Ok? Ok!)) by Yoon Il-sang // Ballad: 3 - Choi Jae-hoon (Rain's Rhapsody) by Joo Young-hoon, 2 - Kim Bum-soo (Miss You) by Yoon Il-sang, 1 - Lim Chang-jung (Then Again) by Kim Hyeong-seok // Muse: 3 - Uhm Jung-hwa (Festival) by Joo Young-hoon, 2 - Cool (Sorrow) by Yoon Il-sang, 1 - Sung Si-kyung (Way To Me) by Kim Hyeong-seok
158	March 31, 2023	Lip J PICK The hit song I want to do a dance challenge from back in the day	Guest: Lip J	10 - Cool (Before You Get Sad), 9 - S.E.S. (Gather Your Dreams), 8 - Fin.K.L (Eternal Love), 7 - Turbo (Black Cat), 6 - Park Nam-jung (Drawing You), 5 - Kim Wan-sun (Dance In The Rhythm), 4 - Baek Ji-young (Dash), 3 - Park Ji-yoon (Coming-Of-Age Ceremony), 2 - Park Jin-young (Honey), 1 - Up (Puyo Puyo)
159	April 7, 2023	A Musical Journey With Kim Jong-Seo! The Rock Ballad Hit Song	Guest(s): Kim Jong-seo	10 - Cho Jang-hyuk (Even If You Leave), 9 - Cult (If I Hold You In My Arms), 8 - Flower (Endless), 7 - Boohwal (Rain And Your Story), 6 - Caterpillar (When Life Comes To An End Before Us), 5 - Park Wan-kyu (Thousand Years Of Love), 4 - Kim Jong-seo (Epilogue), 3 - Kim Kyung-ho (People Who Make Me Sad), 2 - Seomoon Tak (Chain), 1 - Wild Chrysanthemum (That's My World)
160	April 14, 2023	Where Does Your Confidence Come From? The Original Hit Song With A Reason!	No guests	10 - Chae Jung-an (Heartless), 9 - Kookhwan Kim (Tatata), 8 - Shinhwa (Only One), 7 - Lee Ji-hoon (Why Is The Sky), 6 - Park Ji-yoon (Fantasy), 5 - Roo'ra (100Th Day Meeting), 4 - Kim Jung-min (Stay In Your Love), 3 - Park Hyo-shin (Can't Do), 2 - Koyote (Pure),
161	April 21, 2023	Acting Max! Hit Song A Music Video That I Sang And Acted In	No guests	9 - Kim Min-jong (Beautiful Pain), 8 - Position (Blue Day), 7 - H.O.T. (Light), 6 - Turbo (Tonight), 5 - Kim Jang-hoon (Even If The World Deceives You), 4 - Cha Tae-hyun (I Love You), 3 - Shinhwa (Yo! (Bad Boy Report)), 2 - Lim Chang-jung (Sad Self Talk), 1 - Jo Sung-mo (Sad Soul Food),
162	April 28, 2023	Oh! This Song Is A Foreign Song? It'S A Cover Song, Hit Song!	No guests	10 - Pearl (I'm Okay), 9 - Wax (Brother), 8 - S.E.S. (Hugging), 7 - Country Kko Kko (Oh My Julia), 6 - Us (Just Like Now), 5 - Whole Human Rights (After Love), 4 - Late Sky (Funny), 3 - Sim Soo-bong (A Million Roses), 2 - Jang Na-ra (Sweet Dream), 1 - Nami (Sad Relationship)
163	May 5, 2023	Are You Ready? Enjoy A Nightclub Hit Song After Work!	Guest(s): Baek Ga, Kim Jeong-nam	10 - Kim Hyun-jung (Bruise), 9 - Hyun Jin-young (You In A Blurry Memory), 8 - Space A (Maturity), 7 - Now (Inside The Bus), 6 - R.ef (Farewell Formula), 5 - Buck (Barefoot Youth), 4 - DJ DOC (Run To You), 3 - Kim Gun-mo (Wrong Meeting), 2 - Koyote (Dream), 1 - Turbo (Twist King)
164	May 12, 2023	This Isn't A Debut? The Return Of The Singer Hit Song	No guests	8 - NRG (Breakfast At Tiffany's), 7 - Kim Hyung-joong (I Guess It Was), 6 - Rain (Instead Of Saying Goodbye), 5 - Baek Ji-young (Select), 4 - Cool (The Reason I Wanted You), 3 - Diva (Ring), 2 - Coco (These Days We), 1 - Park Jin-young (Do Not Leave Me),
165	May 19, 2023	Don't Sing That Song, Darling! Cancellation Point, Women'S Karaoke Hit Song	No guests	10 - Park Mi-kyung (Reasons Not The Same), 9 - Baby Vox (Hey Hey Hey), 8 - Skool (School) (Julian), 7 - Juliet (Wait Wolf), 6 - Seomoon Tak (Sami Ingok), 5 - B.B (Sky Land Star Land), 4 - Big Mama (Resignation), 3 - Lee Soo-young (La La La), 2 - Jang Na-ra (I Am A Woman Too), 1 - So Chan-whee (Tears)
166	May 26, 2023	I Decide My Own Path, Legend My Way Hit Song!	No guests	10 - Kim Sa-rang (Mojorida), 9 - Kim Ji-hyun (Cat's Eye), 8 - Park Kyung-rim (Swamp Of Illusions), 7 - Moon Hee-joon (Giving Tree), 6 - The Late Yoo Chae-Young (Emotion), 5 - Eve (When You Do), 4 - Kim Jun-sun (Arabian Nights), 3 - Lee Jung-hyun (Will You Give Me), 2 - Psy (Bird), 1 - TJ (Hey Girl)
167	June 2, 2023	A Hit Song That Will Make You Imitate Someone In The Corner Of Your Room!	No guests	10 - Na Hoon-a (Mushiro), 9 - Lee Moon-se (I Don't Know Yet), 8 - Lena Park (In A Dream), 7 - Kim Gun-mo (Sorry), 6 - Lee Seung-hwan (For A Thousand Days), 5 - Lee So-ra (Proposal Of Marriage), 4 - Kim Jong-seo (Winter Rain), 3 - Cho Yong-pil (Short Hair), 2 - Kim Jung-min (Sad Covenant Ceremony), 1 - Yim Jae-beom (For You)
168	June 9, 2023	Falling In Love Isn't A Crime! X Generation's Dating Villain Hit Song	No guests	9 - Uptown (See You Again), 8 - T.T.Ma (Prism), 7 - Space A (The Scarlet Letter), 6 - Park Jin-young (I Have A Girl), 5 - Uhm Jung-hwa (Love Only Allowed By The Sky), 4 - R.ef (Cry In Silence), 3 - Jo Kwan-woo (Swamp), 2 - Cool (Ten Commandments), 1 - Turbo (X (The Greatest Love))
169	June 16, 2023	Do You Like This Style? The Hit Songs Of Singers Who Led The Trend At That Time	No guests	10 - H.O.T. (Wolf And Sheep), 9 - Late Kim Seong-jae (As It Were), 8 - Fin.K.L (Now), 7 - Lee Deok-jin (One Thing I Know), 6 - Tutu (One And A Half), 5 - Solid (Hold The End Of This Night), 4 - Ahn Jae-wook (Forever), 3 - Lee Hyo-ri (10 Minutes), 2 - Roo'ra (Lost Angel), 1 - Seo Taiji and Boys (Come Back Home)
170	June 23, 2023	Rookie Dance Group Hit Song In The Mid-90S	No guests	10 - R.ef (A Silent Cry), 9 - Turbo (My Childhood Dream), 8 - Clon (Kungttari Shabara), 7 - Young Turks Club (Jung (Dangerous Parting)), 6 - Untitled (Take Responsibility), 5 - H.O.T. (Warrior's Descendant (Age Of Violence)), 4 - Sechs Kies (School Byeolgok), 3 - Jinusean (Gasoline), 2 - Diva (Okay), 1 - S.E.S. (group) (('Cause) I'm Your Girl)
171	June 30, 2023	The Boss Hates It~ Karaoke Equipment Damage Triggers Hit Song	Guest(s): Chun Myung hoon, Chae Yeon	9 - Lee Moon-se (A Flaming Sunset), 8 - Lee Jung-hyun (Change), 7 - Nami (Like An Indian Doll), 6 - Jo Sung-mo (Promise), 5 - Buck (Barefoot Youth), 4 - Clon (I Am), 3 - Cherry Filter (Romantic Cat), 2 - Psy (Champion), 1 - Crying Nut (Let's Run),
172	July 7, 2023	A Legendary Live Stage That You Want To See Again And Again, Hit Song	No guests	10 - Lee Hyun-woo (The Day After We Broke Up), 9 - Lee Seung-hwan (Family), 8 - Park Hwayobi (Such A Thing), 7 - Choi Jae-hoon (After Sending You), 6 - SSo Chan-whee (Tears), 5 - Park Hyo-shin (Can't Do), 4 - Lee So-ra (Please), 3 - Boohwal (Lonely Night), 2 - The Cross (Don't Cry), 1 - Caterpillar (When Life Comes To An End Before Us),
173	July 14, 2023	The Bbong Inside Me Is Overflowing! The Bbong Dance Hit Song	No guests	10 - DJ DOC (Dance With Doc), 9 - Turbo (Love Is... (3+3=0)), 8 - Space A (Cheating Man), 7 - Lee Seung-chul (Today Too I), 6 - Turtle (Come On), 5 - Kim Gun-mo (One Flew Over The Cuckoo's Nest), 4 - Kim Hyun-jung (Farewell Returned), 3 - Koyote (Meeting), 2 - Sechs Kies (Coalition), 1 - Young Turks Club (Others)
174	July 28, 2023	Heat Out~! Summer Remake Hit Songs To Prepare For Vacation	No guests	10 - 10cm & Jewelry (I Like You So Much), 9 - Kim Jang-hoon & Yoon Jong-shin (Highway Romance), 8 - Lena Park, Bolbbalgan4 & BoA (Girl From Atlantis), 7 - Jung Eun-ji & Buzz (A Journey To Me), 6 - Oh My Girl & Papaya (Listen To Me), 5 - Sung Si-Kyung, Taeyeon, Soyou & Choi Seung-won (Blue Night In Jeju Island), 4 - Huh Gak, Jung Eun-ji & Up (Ocean), 3 - Paul Kim & Cool (Beach Woman), 2 - Seoyeon & Deux (In The Summer), 1 - Lee Seung-gi & Cho Yong-pil (Go Out Travel)
175	August 4, 2023	You Are Handsome! Hit Song, A Male Band That Dominated The Era	No guests	10 - Girl (Aspirin), 9 - Boohwal (Heeya), 8 - The Nuts (Fool Of Love), 7 - Mono (You Always), 6 - Peregrine Falcon (You Who Happened To Meet), 5 - Genie (What Is This), 4 - Click Rate (Dreaming), 3 - Buzz (Monologue), 2 - Y2K (After Breaking Up), 1 - Yada (Requiem)
176	August 11, 2023	A Hit Song That Captivates Your Ears In Pounds! 10 Seconds	No guests	10 - Jaurim (Magic Carpet Ride), 9 - Shinhwa (Awesome! Awesome!), 8 - White (7 Years Of Love), 7 - Indigo Blue (Summer Please), 6 - Cheol And Mia (Why Are You), 5 - Kim Gun-mo (Excuse), 4 - Yoon Jong-shin (That Day Long Ago), 3 - Park Jin-young (Honey), 2 - Shin Seung-hun (Invisible Love), 1 - Song Chang-Sik (Tobacco Shop Lady)
177	August 18, 2023	You Thought The Follow-Up Song Was Over, Right? Three Songs Of Hardworking Singers Hit Song	No guests	10 - Fin.K.L (Ruby (淚悲)), 9 - Kim Jong-seo (Beautiful Redemption), 8 - Koyote (Together), 7 - Kim Jung-min (Good Bye My Friend), 6 - Baby Vox (Missing You), 5 - Kim Gun-mo (Double), 4 - Jang Na-ra (April Story), 3 - Kim Wan-sun (Masquerade), 2 - g.o.d (Friday Night), 1 - R.ef (Heartache)
178	August 25, 2023	What About Latte? 20Th Century Memory-Inducing Hit Song	No guests	10 - Lee Moon-se (Early Morning Discount), 9 - Kim Hye-rim (Ddd), 8 - Seo Taiji and Boys (Classroom Idea), 7 - Hans Band (Arcade), 6 - Shinhwa (Only One), 5 - Turbo (Which Jazz Bar), 4 - N.EX.T (City Dweller), 3 - DJ DOC (Murphy's Law), 2 - Kim Min-woo (Inside The Boarding Train), 1 - Lee Hye-eun (3Rd Hangang Bridge)
179	September 1, 2023	The Drama Automatically Plays As Soon As You Listen! Popular Ost Hit Song	No guests	10 - Jang Hyun-chul (Walk To The Sky), 9 - Choi Yong-jun (Cheer), 8 - Park Yong-ha (Like The First Day), 7 - Seo Young-eun (You Inside Me), 6 - Lee Seung-chul (Destiny), 5 - Lee Joo-won (For The Love You Saved), 4 - Kim Min-gyo (Last Game), 3 - The Blue (With You), 2 - Jo Sung-mo (By Your Side), 1 - Yoo Seung-beom (Jealousy)
180	September 8, 2023	Ah! That Song! A Regular Hit Song That Is Heard Every Season	No guests	10 - Kim Ji-yeon (When The Cold Wind Blows), 9 - Caterpillar (To You), 8 - Hyeyeon Kim (Seoul Daejeon Daegu Busan), 7 - Kyuyoung Hwang (No Problem), 6 - Clon (City Escape), 5 - Kim Kwang-seok (Private'S Letter), 4 - Sunset (Proposal Of Marriage), 3 - Turbo (White Love (At The Ski Resort)), 2 - Mr.2 (White Winter), 1 - Kim Hyun-sik (Like Rain, Like Music)
181	September 15, 2023	Same Title, Different Feeling! Same Name Hit Songs	No guests	8 - DJ DOC, Jo Kwan-woo (Winter Story), 7 - Clon, Chakra (Come Back), 6 - Position, Cha Tae-hyun (I Love You), 5 - Shinhwa, Yoon Jong-shin (Your Wedding), 4 - Kim Kwang-jin, Chae Jung-an (Letter), 3 - Noh Sa-yeon, Koyote (Meeting), 2 - Han Dong-jun, S.E.S. (group) (Love You), 1 - Diva, Song Chang-sik (Why Call)
182	September 22, 2023	Hit-A-Doodle-Doo, A Favorite Song From Back Then That Was Loved By Junior Singers	No guests	10 - YB (I Am A Butterfly), 9 - Joo Hyun-mi (Blues Of Tears), 8 - Kim Bum-soo (Miss You), 7 - Kim Jang-hoon (Even If The World Deceives You), 6 - Sanwoolim (Through The Window, You Will Vaguely Remember The Past), 5 - Kim Min-jong (Endless Love), 4 - Exhibition (Study Of Memory), 3 - Kim Gun-mo (Moon Of Seoul), 2 - Yim Jae-beom (For You), 1 - Lee Moon-se (Old Love)
183	September 29, 2023	[Chuseok Special] Top Actors Sing The 20th Century Hit Songs, Hit-Tune Song	No guests	10 - Han Ji-min (Can - Winter Story), 9 - Seol In-ah (The Classic - Fox), 8 - Cho Seung-woo (The Late Kim Kwang-Seok - Around 30), 7 - Shin Min-a (Kang Su-ji - My Winter Alone), 6 - Han Suk-kyu (Lee Moon-Se - With You Forever), 5 - Lee Sung-kyung (Cho Yong-pil - I Hope That's The Case Now), 4 - Rich Man (Nami - A Sad Fate), 3 - Lee Byung-hun (Dawn - After Love), 2 - Kim Hye-soo (Won Jun-hee - Love Is Like Glass), 1 - Lee Jung-jae (Late Yoo Jae-ha - Because I Love You)
184	October 6, 2023	Retro K-Pop Hit-Tunes Recognized Abroad	No guests	10 - Han Myeong-sook (The Man In The Yellow Shirt), 9 - Love And Peace (I'Ve Been Away For A While), 8 - Lee Mi-ja (Camellia Lady), 7 - Pearl Sisters (A Cup Of Coffee), 6 - Wild Chrysanthemum (That'S My World), 5 - Nami (Round And Round), 4 - Sanwoolim (No Already), 3 - Kim Wan-sun (Pierrot Smiles At Us), 2 - Shin Jung-hyeon and Yeopjeon (Beauty), 1 - Cho Yong-pil (Short Hair)
185	October 13, 2023	Generation Z Doesn'T Know~ The Hit Songs Of Singers Back In Their Prime	No guests	10 - S.E.S. (group) (Love), 9 - Roo'ra (Lover), 8 - Jinyoung Hyun (Sad Mannequin), 7 - M.I.L.K. (Come To Me), 6 - Sechs Kies (Road Fighter), 5 - Boohwal (The More You Love), 4 - Buzz (Coward), 3 - g.o.d (Sorrow), 2 - H.O.T. (Candy), 1 - Park Nam-jung (Crash Of Love)
186	October 20, 2023	Viewer Pick! Congratulations On Your Own Hit Song Filled With Memories Of Parting Up	No guests	10 - Won Mi-yeon (Farewell Trip), 9 - Can (Sangyeon Cheon), 8 - Hong Kyung-min (For My Remaining Love), 7 - Koyote (Dream), 6 - Yarn (So You), 5 - Yerin Lee (Under The Poplar Tree), 4 - Lee Jeong-bong (How About This), 3 - K2 Kim Seong-myeon (To Her Lover... #Story I), 2 - Kim Hye-rim (Farewell For Me), 1 - Yada (Already Sad Love)
187	October 27, 2023	Shh! It's A Secret~ The Faceless Singer Who Hid His Identity, Hit Song	No guests	10 - Wax (Mom's Diary), 9 - Byun Jin-Seop (Being Alone), 8 - Lee Hyun-woo (I Have To Erase You In Sadness), 7 - V.One (I Guess So), 6 - Jo Kwan-woo (Swamp), 5 - Kim Jung-min (Stay In Your Love), 4 - Kim Bum-soo (Promise), 3 - Brown Eyes (Already One Year), 2 - Jo Sung-mo (To Heaven), 1 - Sky (Forever)
188	November 3, 2023	Even Men Will Cry! Autumn Rock Ballad Hit Song	No guests	10 - Han Kyung-il (Half Of My Life), 9 - Flower (Tear), 8 - Choi Jae-hoon (Letter), 7 - Kim Don-kyu (My Own Sadness), 6 - Kim Hyun-sung (Heaven), 5 - Cho Jang-hyuk (Addicted Love), 4 - Yada (Requiem), 3 - K2 Kim Seong-myeon (Glass Castle #Story III), 2 - Kim Kyung-ho (My Love In Heaven), 1 - Kim Jong-seo (You Without Answer)
189	November 10, 2023	The Top 1% Of The Music Industry, Brainy Sexy Singer Hit Song	No guests	10 - Hey (Je T'Aime), 9 - Joo (I Will Love You), 8 - Lee So-eun (Farewell), 7 - Epik High (Fly), 6 - Bom Yeoreum Gaeul Kyeoul (Someone'S Dream), 5 - Lena Park (I'll Write You), 4 - 015B (Love Of New People), 3 - Sung Si-kyung (Like The First Time), 2 - Panic (Left Handed), 1 - Park Jin-young (Do Not Leave Me)
190	November 17, 2023	The Nostalgic Pop Hit Songs We Enjoyed Listening To Back Then	No guests	10 - New Kids On The Block (Step By Step), 9 - Westlife (My Love), 8 - Spice Girls (Wannabe), 7 - Richard Marx (Now And Forever), 6 - Celine Dion (My Heart Will Go On), 5 - Ricky Martin (Livin' la Vida Loca), 4 - Britney Spears (...Baby One More Time), 3 - Steelheart (She's Gone), 2 - Mariah Carey (All I Want For Christmas Is You), 1 - Michael Jackson (Billie Jean)
191	November 24, 2023	Eardrum Alert! Trust And Listen To The Timbre Gangster Hit Song	No guests	10 - Lee Soo-young (All Of A Sudden), 9 - Lee Sang-woo (Where To Meet Her 100M Ago), 8 - T (After Time Passes), 7 - Vibe (Even If I Hate You, Once Again), 6 - Lee Seung-hwan (As Much As The Love Sprinkled In The World), 5 - Jo Sung-mo (Thorn Tree), 4 - Exhibition (Drunk Talk), 3 - Sung Si-kyung (Heejae), 2 - Shin Seung-hun (You Reflected In A Smile), 1 - Lee Seung-chul (Do Not Say Goodbye)
192	December 1, 2023	If Being Cool Is A Crime, Then Life Imprisonment! Back Then, Guilty People, Hit Song	No guests	10 - Mind And Body (Selfish Jerk), 9 - Kim Bu-yong (Poverty In Abundance), 8 - Kim Min-jong (Under The Sky), 7 - Choi Chang-min (Awesome), 6 - Cho Jeong-Hyeon (I Loved You Until The Pain), 5 - Na Hoon-a (Mushiro), 4 - Koo Bon-seung (Just For You), 3 - Park Hye-sung (Gyeonga), 2 - Lee Deok-jin (One Thing I Know), 1 - Kim Won-jun (After Everyone Is Asleep)
193	December 8, 2023	Did You Know? The Composer Of This Song Is Me! Hit-T-Song	No guests	10 - H.O.T. (Happiness), 9 - 1TYM (One Love), 8 - Do Won-kyung (If You Love Again), 7 - Kim Jung-min (Last Promise), 6 - Kim Hyun-jung (Are You Really), 5 - Uhm Jung-hwa (Invitation), 4 - Roo'ra (3! 4!), 3 - Ryu (From The Beginning Until Now), 2 - Kim Won-jun (Show), 1 - Kim Hee-ae (Do Not Forget Me)
194	December 15, 2023	The Tough Girls Have Gathered! Golden Girls Hit Song	No guests	10 - Yes Yes Yes (I'M Leaving), 9 - Seomoon Tak (Love Never Fades), 8 - Lee Jung-hyun (Crazy), 7 - Shin Hyo-beom (I Love You), 6 - Baby Vox (Betrayal), 5 - Han Young-ae (No One), 4 - Insooni (Night After Night), 3 - So Chan-hwee (Wise Choice), 2 - Diva (Up & Down), 1 - Park Mi-kyung (You Don't Live Like That)
195	December 22, 2023	Solo Heaven! Christmas Nightclub Hit Song	Guest(s): Myung -Hoon Chun, Hyun- Ah Jo	9 - Uhm Jung-hwa (Go Away), 8 - Bb (Sky Earth Star Land), 7 - S#arp (Tell Me Tell Me), 6 - Baek Ji-young (Dash), 5 - Country Kko Kko (Happy Christmas), 4 - Cool (Before You Get Sad), 3 - Turbo (White Love (At The Ski Resort)), 2 - Rumors (Storm), 1 - Space A (Sexy Man),
196	December 29, 2023	Picketing Year-End Concert Famous Singer Hit Song	No Guests	10 - Lee Seung-chul (Girls' Generation), 9 - Lee Mi-ja (Nineteen Innocent), 8 - N.EX.T (Here, I Stand For You), 7 - Lee Seung-hwan (Dunk Shot), 6 - g.o.d (Sky Blue Balloon), 5 - Park Hyo-shin (Snow Flower), 4 - Lee Moon-se (Girl), 3 - Sung Si-kyung (Way To Me), 2 - Psy (Champion), 1 - Cho Yong-pil (Bitter Regret)

=== 2024 ===
List of episodes in 2024 (episode 197–245)

Episodes	Broadcast Date	Theme	Remark (s)	Featured Hit Songs
197	January 5, 2024	20th Century: Huge Hit Songs from the Last Year of the Dragon	No guests	10 - Tj (Jang Hyuk) (Hey Girl), 9 - Chakra (One), 8 - Baek Ji-young (Sad Salsa), 7 - DJ DOC (Run To You), 6 - Park Ji-yoon (Coming of Age Ceremony), 5 - Fin.K.L (Now), 4 - Kyungmin Hong (Shaken Friendship), 3 - Seo Taiji (It's Ultraman), 2 - g.o.d (Lies), 1 - Jo Sung-mo (Do You Know)
198	January 12, 2024	First Love Singers: Heart-Fluttering Hit Songs from Back Then	No guests	10 - Hyunhee Na (Won'T Love), 9 - Amniotic Fluid (Love Is Like Raindrops Outside The Window), 8 - Hyeri Jang (I'll Give You My Remaining Love), 7 - Jaeyoung Lee (Temptation), 6 - Hyun And Deok (You Like Me I Like You), 5 - Junhee Won (Love Is Like Glass), 4 - Hyeeun Lee (Dawn Rain), 3 - Ha Soo-bin (No No No No No), 2 - Jiyeon Lee (I Don'T Know Love Yet), 1 - River Basin (Purple Scent)
199	January 19, 2024	Hit Song Your Way! 2024 Reversal Chart Hit Song	Special MC: Oh Hyo-joo	10 - Yuna Jeon (Even Though I Love You), 9 - Ocean (5Tion) (More Than Words), 8 - Arcade (After), 7 - Page (Don'T Let The Breakup Come), 6 - H (Did You Forget), 5 - Five (F-Iv) (Girl), 4 - City Kids (Telepathy), 3 - Esther (What Did You Do Wrong), 2 - Clinical Child (Musical), 1 - Lee Sang Eun (Someday)
200	January 26, 2024	200th Episode Special: Heechul's Top Hit Songs	F.T. Island Hongki, Jang Keun-suk	9 - Kwangseok Kim (I Loved It But), 8 - Cho Yong-pil (Dream), 7 - Bank (You Can'T Have), 6 - R.Ef (Brilliant Love), 5 - Y2K (After Breaking Up), 4 - YB (Send You), 3 - Can (Springtime In My Life), 2 - Lee Ki-chan (Cold), 1 - F.T. Island (Love Sickness)
201	February 2, 2024	Just Right For Four! Perfect 4-Member Group Hit Song	Special MC: Ji Yea-un	10 - Jewelry (Again), 9 - Up (Puyo Puyo), 8 - Big Mama (Break Away), 7 - Chakra (Hey U), 6 - Taesaja (Time), 5 - Two Two (One And A Half), 4 - 1TYM (One Time), 3 - S#arp (Sweety), 2 - Noise (Imaginary You), 1 - Fin.K.L (Eternal Love)
202	February 9, 2024	Must Listen In The New Year~ Song For Wish Fulfillment Hit Song	Special MC: Chuu	10 - Turtle (Bingo), 9 - Yoon Soo-Il (Apartment), 8 - Jo Sung-mo (Promise), 7 - Super Junior (Miracle), 6 - Jam (Zam) (I Don'T Stop), 5 - Bubble Sisters (Men Fall Like Rain From The Sky), 4 - Turbo (I Have A Lover), 3 - Wax (Money), 2 - Cool (Jumpo Mambo), 1 - Song Dae-Gwan (Sunrise Day)
203	February 16, 2024	You Can Tell Just By Listening~ Nostalgic Cf Hit Song	Special MC: Chuu	10 - Whole Human Rights (Turn, Turn, Turn), 9 - Lee Mi-Ja (Camellia Lady), 8 - Park Ji-yoon (Fantasy), 7 - Hyeeun Lee (Blue Country), 6 - 015B (Very Old Lovers), 5 - Bicycle Riding Landscape (Me To You, You To Me), 4) - Resurrection (Rain And Your Story), 3 - Kim Gun-mo (Are You Friend I'M A Lover!), 2 - Chyle (Love Is Always Thirsty), 1 - The Blue (Feeling Only You)
204	February 23, 2024	8090! Classic Talent Show Hit Song From School Days	Special MC: Haewon (Nmixx)	10 - Clon (Initial Training), 9 - Diva (Why Call), 8 - Kim Heung-Guk (Swallowtail Butterfly), 7 - H.O.T. (We Are The Future), 6 - Lee Sang Eun (Damdadi), 5 - Jinyoung Hyun (You In A Blurry Memory), 4 - Park Jin-young (Honey), 3 - Roo'ra (Lost Angel), 2 - Fire Truck (Last Night Story), 1 - Namjung Park (Drawing You)
205	March 1, 2024	March 1 Special: Hit Songs That Stir Your Heart Instantly	Special MC: Haewon (Nmixx)	9 - O.P.P.A (Patriotism), 8 - Shin Hee Shin (Beautiful Country), 7 - Jeong Su-Ra (Ah! Korea), 6 - Heeeun Yang (Evergreen), 5 - Loveholics (Butterfly), 4 - Now N New (Become One), 3 - Sumi Jo (Champions), 2 - Lazybone (Our Strength...), 1 - Koreana (Hand In Hand)
206	March 8, 2024	Viewer'S Pick! High Note Champion Hit Song	Special MC: Urban Zakapa Jo Hyunah	9 - Baek Ji-young (Burden), 9 - Flower (Endless), 8 - Muntak Seo (Sami Ingok), 7 - Hyunseong Kim (Heaven), 6 - Sangmin Kim (You), 5 - The Cross (Don'T Cry), 4 - Resurrection (Lonely Night), 3 - Kyungho Kim (Forbidden Love), 2 - Big Mama (Resignation), 1 - Chanwhee So (Tears)
207	March 15, 2024	New Semester Special! Rookie Artists Who Debuted In Spring Hit Song	Special MC: JD1 (Jeong Dong-won)	10 - Plum (Bye), 9 - Position (Love Without Regret), 8 - Wanseon Kim (Tonight), 7 - Sechs Kies (Academy Byeolgok), 6 - Cho Yong-pil (Short Hair), 5 - Mythology (Fixer), 4 - R.Ef (Cry In Silence), 3 - Fire Truck (Tell Her), 2 - Deux (Look Back At Me), 1 - Seo Taiji and Boys (I Know It)
208	March 22, 2024	Just Like Back Then!! Frozen In Time Singer Hit Song	Special MC: H1-Key Seo Yi, Announcer Lee Ho-geun	10 - Baby Vox (Accident), 9 - Turbo (Goodbye Yesterday), 8 - Chaeyeon (Together), 7 - Fly To The Sky (Sea Of Love), 6 - Mythology (Brand New), 5 - Y2K (Grief), 4 - Koyote (Blue), 3 - Kim Won-jun (While You Are Gone), 2 - g.o.d (Observe), 1 - Jang Na-ra (April Story)
209	March 29, 2024	Even More Surprising When You Know The Truth Hit Song	Special MC: H1-Key RIINA, Announcer Lee Ho-geun	10 - Mc Sniper (Bk Love), 9 - Yoon Soo-Il (Apartment), 8 - N.Ex.T (Fly Chick), 7 - Junghyun Lee (Crazy), 6 - Sangmin Park (Sunflower (To Her..)), 5 - Lee Jae-Min (Close), 4 - Seo Taiji and Boys (Come Back Home), 3 - Resurrection (Heeya), 2 - Kim Gun-mo (Wrong Meeting), 1 - H.O.T. (Hey!)
210	April 5, 2024	Did This Really Happen In The Past? Career Change Singer Hit Song	Special MC: Choa	10 - More Classic (Magic Castle), 9 - Jang Hye-jin (One late night in 1994), 8 - Dr. Lee (Monkey Magic), 7 - Super Junior (Twins (Knock Out)), 6 - Wax (Fix The Makeup), 5 - Cherry Filter (Original), 4 - V.O.S (Look Me In The Eyes And Tell Me), 3 - Jaehoon Tak (The Path I Chose), 2 - Park Wan-kyu (The Name Of Desire), 1 - Joo Hyun-mi(Wait For A Sec)
211	April 12, 2024	Gen Z Ear Attack! Remake Original Hit Song	Special MC: Sandara Park	10 - H.O.T. (Candy), 9 - Jeongbong Lee (How About This), 8 - Sung Si-kyung (Would Be Nice), 7 - Park Jin-young (Elevator), 6 - Deli Spice (Confession), 5 - Click Rate (100 Battles Undefeated), 4 - Jay (Like Yesterday), 3 - Seunghwan Lee (An Unflattering Confession), 2 - Seo Taiji and Boys (Regret Of The Times), 1 - Sanwoolim (Your Meaning)
212	April 19, 2024	Tempting Tunes: 19+ Rated Hit Songs	Special MC: Soyou	10 - Sim Soo-Bong (I Don'T Know Anything But Love), 9 - S#arp (Closely), 8 - Papaya (Making Love), 7 - Solid (Hold The End Of This Night), 6 - Young Tux Club (Others), 5 - NRG (Hit Song), 4 - The Late Bangsil (Seoul Tango), 3 - Fin.K.L (Mask Time), 2 - Yoonjeong Jang (Oh My Goodness!), 1 - Tae Jin-Ah (A Girl Who Doesn'T Even Look In The Mirror)
213	April 26, 2024	Military Sweethearts: Billboard-Topping Hit Songs	Special MC: Brave Girls Yujeong	10 - Mina (Answer The Phone), 9 - Chaeyeon (Dangerous Show), 8 - Yerin Lee (As Always), 7 - Gapkyung Cho (Stupid Smile), 6 - Cleo (Good Time), 5 - Baby Vox (Killer), 4 - Baboon (Sky Land Star Land), 3 - Coco (These Days We), 2 - Buzz (Thorn), 1 - Lee Hyori (10 Minutes)
214	May 3, 2024	Time-Slip As Soon As You Hear It! Nostalgia-Inducing Hit Song	Special MC: Uhm Jiyoon	10 - Sangmin Park (Way To You), 9 - Sensitive (A Boy'S Love Story), 8 - N.Ex.T (From The Sun To The Boy), 7 - 7 Princesses (Love Song), 6 - Choi Bul-Am & Jeong Yeo-Jin (Daddy'S Words), 5 - Five Fingers (Balloon), 4 - Hyeeun Lee (Pinocchio), 3 - Soocheol Kim (Chikichikichakachaka), 2 - Kookhwan Kim (Galaxy Express 999)
215	May 10, 2024	An Illogical Reason! Forbidden Song Hit Song	Special MC: Brave GirlsYujeong	9 - Kim Chu-Ja (It Is A Lie), 8 - Ilho Bae (Shinto Fire), 7 - Jongshin Yoon (Rebirth), 6 - Wild Chrysanthemum (March), 5 - Cool (Sorrow), 4 - Janghee Lee (That's You), 3 - Song Chang-sik (Whale Hunting), 2 - DJ DOC (Beauty And The Beast (Ok? Ok!)), 1 - Shin Joong-Hyun And Yeopjeons (Beauty)
216	May 17, 2024	Singing About Youth! Nostalgic Music Festival Hit Song	Special MC: Mijoo	10 - Hexagonal Number (Heungbo Is Staggering), 9 - Tisams (Wait Every Day), 8 - Jungseok Lee (The First Snow Is Coming), 7 - Miri Yumi (Notes Of Youth), 6 - Mikyung Park (Dandelion Spore), 5 - Treble Clef (Lying In The Sea), 4 - Oxon 80 (It'S Fire), 3 - Sharp (After The Play), 2 - Sim Soo-Bong (Then That Person), 1 - Sand Pebbles (What Should I Do)
217	May 31, 2024	Back To 1994! Music Top 10 Chart In Hit Song	Special MC: Kim Jeongmin	10 - Mosaic (Free Time), 9 - Music (New Feeling), 8 - Turn Left (Rehearsal), 7 - Two Two (Even Your Tears), 6 - Junsun Kim (Mama Boy), 5 - Hyungjun Park (You In My Heart), 4 - Noise (When I Resemble You), 3 - Mono (You Always), 2 - Kim Won-jun (Always), 1 - Lim Ju-Ri (Put On Thick Lipstick)
218	June 7, 2024	Not the Original? Revived and Resurrected Hit Songs	Special MC: Lee Sieon	10 - Big Mama (Break Away), 9 - Rumble Fish (Eulachacha), 8 - Tashani (Every Day), 7 - Janghoon Kim (Opera), 6 - Tuya (Look), 5 - Baby Vox (Accident), 4 - Gangjin (Dang Bee), 3 - Wanseon Kim (I'M Going To Forget It Now), 2 - Byun Jin-Seop (You Back To Me), 1 - Kwangseok Kim (Become Dust)
219	June 14, 2024	Mouthwatering Tunes: Late-Night Snack-Inspiring Hit Songs	Special MC: Chuu	10 - Lim Byung-Soo (Ice Cream Love), 9 - Nemesis (Cotton Candy), 8 - Shop (My Lips... Like Warm Coffee), 7 - Hanbok Man (Bindaetteok Shrine), 6 - Cool (Beer And Peanuts), 5 - Changwan Kim (Mackerel With Mother), 4 - More Plums (Kimbap), 3 - Jongshin Yoon (Red Bean Shaved Ice), 2 - Vibe (It'S Alcohol), 1 - Nuclear Bombs And Guided Missiles (Ramen And Gugongtan)
220	June 21, 2024	Am I the Last to Know? Surprising Lyricists Behind the Hits	No guests	10 - Wanseon Kim (Dance In The Rhythm), 9 - The Blue (With You), 8 - Jewelry (Super Star), 7 - Fin.K.L (Forever), 6 - Hyuncheol Kim (What'S The Matter), 5 - Lee Ki-chan (Love Goes Again), 4 - Taehyun Cha (I Love You), 3 - Minwoo Kim (Inside The Boarding Train), 2 - Jiae Kim (Nasty Person), 1 - Jo Sung-mo (To Heaven)
221	June 28, 2024	The Brother Singer Who Gathered The Girls Hit Song	No guests	10 - Peregrine Falcon (You Who Happened To Meet), 9 - Hyesung Park (Gyeonga), 8 - Beomryong Kim (Wind Wind Wind), 7 - Seunghwan Lee (As Much As The Love Sprinkled In The World), 6 - Kim Won-jun (After Everyone Is Asleep), 5 - Byun Jin-Seop (Like Birds), 4 - Namjin (With You), 3 - Hoonah Na (Weed), 2 - Youngrok Jeon (I Guess It's Still A Dark Night), 1 - Cho Yong-pil (Mona Lisa)
222	July 5, 2024	This Is Mutual Assistance! The Strongest Combo Hit Song	No guests	9 - Choreographer Hong Young-joo (Select), 8 - Jo Yoon-hee appears in music video (I Believe), 7 - Composer Lee Young-hoon (I Don'T Know Yet), 6 - Photographer Kim Jung-man (Wild Eyes), 5 - Composer Yoon Sang (Scent In Time), 4 - Information Yoon Stylist (To My Boyfriend), 3 - Director Kim Se-hoon (Sad Soul Food), 2 - Representative Lee Soo-man (Sad Mannequin), 1 - Singer Kim Jong-seo (Free Style),
223	July 12, 2024	20Th Century Spicy Taste ! Dance High Note Hit Song	No guests	10 - R.Ef (Deaf Sky), 9 - DJ DOC (Murphy'S Law), 8 - Up (1024), 7 - Mikyung Park (Obsession), 6 - Duke (Starian), 5 - Space A (The Scarlet Letter), 4 - Turbo (Cyber Lover), 3 - Hyunjung Kim (Farewell Returned), 2 - Roo'ra (Wind Change Song), 1 - Koyote (Broken Heart)
224	July 19, 2024	Face Is A Stranger! Song Is Famous~ Hit Song	No guests	10 - Jiho Hong (Propose), 9 - Kiss (Because I Am A Woman), 8 - Black Hole (Lyric Song Of The Deep Night), 7 - B612 (My Own You), 6 - Sungshin Park (One More Time), 5 - Juniper (Tears Shed At The End Of The Sky), 4 - Rumors (Storm), 3 - Seunghoon Lee (Rainy Street), 2 - Izi (Emergency Room), 1 - Sungjae Moon (Busan Seagull)
225	July 26, 2024	Back to 1988: Revisiting Nostalgic Hit Songs	No guests	10 - Cho Yong-pil (Seoul Seoul Seoul), 9 - Jongchan Kim (Saturday Night Is Good), 8 - The Late Hyuncheol (Balsam'S Coalition), 7 - Lee Chi-Hyun And Friends (Gypsy Woman), 6 - Min Hae-Kyung (You Look Like A Rose), 5 - Youngrok Jeon (Afterglow), 4 - Firetruck (Top Secret), 3 - Lee Moon-sae (Standing Under the Shade of a Roadside Tree), 2 - Jeong Su-Ra (Joy), 1 - Joo Hyun-mi (Shinsa-Dong, That Person)
226	August 2, 2024	Star Pick! Summer Vacation Hit Song	No guests	10 - Turtle (Airplane), 9 - Cola (It'S A Mosquito), 8 - Indigo Blue (Summer Please), 7 - Clon (City Escape), 6 - Cho Yong-pil (Go Out Travel), 5 - Psy (Paradise (Feat. Jaehoon Lee)), 4 - Kona (Our Nights Are More Beautiful Than Your Days), 3 - Travel Sketch (The Stars Are Falling), 2 - Roo'ra (3! 4!), 1 - Deux (Look Back At Me)
227	August 9, 2024	20Th Century Hit Song Shout Out Home Rock Festival Hit Song	No guests	10 - No Brain (Fall In Love), 9 - Transfiction (Come Back To Me), 8 - Deli Spice (Chow Chow), 7 - Shareholder Club (16/20), 6 - Flower (Expression Of Affection), 5 - Eve (I'll Be There), 4 - YB (I Will Forget), 3 - Jaurim (Deviation), 2 - Spring Summer Fall Winter (Bravo, My Life!), 1 - Sinawi (Turn The Radio Up Loud)
228	August 16, 2024	Viewer Pick! Karaoke Ultimate Hit Song	No guests	10 - Seo Joo-Kyung (Daring Woman), 9 - Joo Young-hoon & Lee Hye Jin (Our Love Like This), 8 - Kiyoung Park (Last Love), 7 - Kyungho Kim (Forbidden Love), 6 - Hyungjoong Kim (I Guess It Was), 5 - Lim Jaebum (Emergency), 4 - Onion (A'Ddio), 3 - Sung Si-kyung (You Were Impressed), 2 - Kim Gun-mo (Wrong Meeting), 1 - Up (Puyo Puyo)
229	August 23, 2024	Hit Song Born In 10 Minutes	No guests	10 - Park Jin-young (Behind You), 9 - Kyu-Seok Lee (Train And Pine), 8 - High Earthquake (Slow Kid), 7 - Panic (Snail), 6 - Sungwoo Shin (Foreword), 5 - Jiyeon Lee (Stop The Wind), 4 - Lee Hyun Woo (The Day After We Broke Up), 3 - Hyunjung Kim (Single Knife), 2 - Hyuncheol Kim (Fall Of The Moon), 1 - Soocheol Kim (Young Darling)
230	September 6, 2024	Autumn Nostalgia: Hit Songs That Rekindle Old Flames	No guests	10 - Seunghun Shin (Long After That), 9 - Leeds (You Will Live Happily), 8 - Hyerim Kim (Farewell For Me), 7 - Jeong In-Ho (Do), 6 - Empathy (Heart For One), 5 - Changmo Koo (Hinari), 4 - Jang Hyuk Cho (Addicted Love), 3 - Seo Ji Won (Gather My Tears), 2 - Lee So-ra (Please), 1 - Park Wan-kyu (Thousand Years Of Love)
231	September 13, 2024	Blood Can't Lie! Turns Out They're A Singer Family Hit Song	No guests	10 - Bang (Polar Star), 9 - Shin Hae-chul (Hi), 8 - Fly to the Sky (Even If It Hurts), 7 - Vibe (Promise U), 6 - g.o.d (I Love You And Remember), 5 - Jay (831 8), 4 - Jo Sung-mo (Regret), 3 - Jangdeok (After Leaving), 2 - Mind And Body (You Are The Only One), 1 - Lim Jihoon (Reminisce)
232	September 20, 2024	90'S New Jack Swing Hit Song	No guests	10 - Wanseon Kim (Pierrot Smiles At Us), 9 - Cool (Little Wait), 8 - Solid (My Own Friend), 7 - Tashani (Warning), 6 - Seo Taiji and Boys (This Night Goes Deep), 5 - Diva (Joy), 4 - Untitled (Wing), 3 - S.E.S. (group) (I'm Your Girl), 2 - Jinyoung Hyun (Hot Girl), 1 - Deux (We Are)
233	September 27, 2024	Surprising Charm: Gender-Swap Hit Songs	No guests	10 - Park Myung-Soo (Prince Of The Sea), 9 - Weather Forecast (Doll's Dream), 8 - Park Hwayobi (Such A Thing), 7 - Park Jin-young (I Have A Girl), 6 - Byun Jin-Seop (To You Again), 5 - Fire Truck (Last Night Story), 4 - River Basin (Scattered Days), 3 - Fin.K.L (Now), 2 - Seonjoo Park (By Ear), 1 - Nami (Sad Relationship)
234	October 4, 2024	Hangul Day Special! Beautiful Lyrics Trend Songs	Guest(s): Kim Eana, Kim Hyungseok	9 - Lee So-ra (The Wind Blows), 8 - Sung Si-kyung (Like The First Time), 7 - Song Dae-Gwan (Four Beats), 6 - Cho Yong-pil (Song Of The Wind), 5 - R.Ef (Farewell Formula), 4 - Yoon Sang (Between Hidden Times), 3 - Lee Moon-sae (Old Love), 2 - Byun Jin-Seop (To The Lady), 1 - Jaeha Yoo (My Reflection In My Heart)
235	October 11, 2024	Warning! The Era'S Girl Group Member Hit Song	No guests	11th - Junhee Park (Even If I Close My Eyes), 10 - Yeonkyung Lee (I Don'T Want To Love You), 9 - Hyeji Ahn (This Night Has Already Passed), 8 - Seonghee Kim (Attractiveness), 7 - Amniotic Fluid (Love Is A Cold Temptation), 6 - Jaeyoung Lee (Temptation), 5 - Yoon Young-Ah (Mini Date), 4 - Lee Sang Eun (Damdadi), 3 - Hyeri Jang (I'Ll Give You My Remaining Love), 2 - Ha Soo-bin (No No No No No), 1 - Wanseon Kim (A Happy Day)
236	October 18, 2024	Hidden Gems: Lesser-Known Songs in Big Hits	No guests	10 - Turbo (My Childhood Dream), 9 - Position (Remember), 8 - Rain (Bad Guy), 7 - Solid (You Are My First And Last), 6 - Country Kko Kko (One Heart), 5 - H.O.T. (Wolf And Sheep), 4 - Jinusean (Gasoline), 3 - Pinocchio (To Meet You Again), 2 - Panic (No One), 1 - Kim Gun-mo (Love Alone)
237	October 25, 2024	As Time Passes~ Timeless Classics That Sound Different After Forty Hit Song	No guests	10 - Jinwon Kwon (As You Live), 9 - Hyeseung Yang (Gorgeous Single), 8 - Yuna Kim (Spring Day Goes), 7 - Lee Nam-Yi (Want To Cry), 6 - Hans Band (Arcade), 5 - Kim Gun-mo (Sorry), 4 - Caterpillar (When Life Before Us Comes To An End), 3 - Lee Sang Eun (Someday), 2 - Kwangseok Kim (Around Thirty), 1 - Sanwoolim (Youth)
238	November 1, 2024	Wanna Go Together? Nostalgic Places Hit Song	No guests	10 - Song Chang-sik (Tobacco Shop Girl), 9 - Sung Si-kyung (Blue Night In Jeju Island), 8 - Shin Hae-chul (Jazz Cafe), 7 - Crying Nut (Myeongdong Calling), 6 - Choi Baekho (About Romance), 5 - Hyuncheol Kim (Train To Chuncheon), 4 - Weather Forecast (Good Good), 3 - Seolundo (Twist Of Love), 2 - Zoo (Hyehwa-Dong), 1 - Lee Moon-sae (Gwanghwamun Love Song)
239	November 8, 2024	Gulp~! Live Performance That Devours The Cd Hit Song	No guests	10 - Beomhak Lee (Farewell Not Farewell), 9 - Miri Yumi (Notes Of Youth), 8 - Lee Ki-chan (Please), 7 - Jaehoon Choi (Rhapsody Of Rain), 6 - Eunha Lee (Like The Way You Sent Me Away With A Smile), 5 - Cho Jeong-Hyeon (I Loved You Until The Pain), 4 - Jeong Su-Ra (Joy), 3 - Kim Bum-soo (One Day), 2 - Park Hyo-shin (Fool), 1 - Lee Seung-chul (Last Concert)
240	November 22, 2024	Dear~ Don't Meet Someone Like This: Hit Songs with a Warning	No guests	10 - Jinusean (Phone Number), 9 - Chae Jung An (Letter), 8 - BoA (Don'T Start Now), 7 - Uhm Jung-hwa (I Don't Know), 6 - Kim Won-jun (While You Are Gone), 5 - Cool (Fate), 4 - Koyote (Flame), 3 - Byun Jin-Seop (Wishes), 2 - Mythology (Only One), 1 - Sangmin Park (Good Bye Weapon)
241	November 29, 2024	I Want To Know! The Singer Who Suddenly Disappeared Hit Song	No guests	10 - Aftershocks (I Only Miss You), 9 - Changmin Choi (Hero), 8 - Tuya (Go), 7 - Yoo Seung-Beom (Jealousy), 6 - Junhee Won (Love Is Like Glass), 5 - Lim Jong-Hwan (I Just Walked), 4 - Mr.2 (White Winter), 3 - Jiae Kim (Secret Love), 2 - Donkyu Kim (My Own Sadness), 1 - Minwoo Kim (A Friend Like Rest)
242	December 6, 2024	Sniff Sniff! Hit Song That Smells Like Winter	No guests	10 - Blue Sky (Winter Sea), 9 - Jo Sung-mo (Thorn Tree), 8 - Minjong Kim (White Longing), 7 - Star (12024), 6 - Diva (Drama In December), 5 - Ryu (From The Beginning Until Now), 4 - Xiamen Jo (Snowy Night), 3 - Sechs Kies (Couple), 2 - Willow Flute (Winter Child), 1 - Turbo (Reminisce)
243	December 13, 2024	Quick Recharge For The Hardworking You Hit Song	No guests	10 - Hancheol Lee (Superstar), 9 - Kwangseok Kim (Wake Up), 8 - Click Rate (Undefeated), 7 - Janghoon Kim (Sano Ramen), 6 - Buck (Barefoot Youth), 5 - Kim Won-jun (Show), 4 - S.E.S. (group) (Running), 3 - g.o.d (One Candle), 2 - Carnival (Dream Of Goose), 1 - In The Mountains (You Can Do It)
244	December 20, 2024	Almost Winners: Hit Songs That Just Missed the Golden Cup	No guests	9 - Koo Bonseung (Just For You), 8 - Junsun Kim (Arabian Night), 7 - DJ DOC (Summer Story), 6 - Jihun Lee (Why Is The Sky), 5 - Seo Taiji and Boys (Go Ahead), 4 - Yoon Soo-Il (Ecstatic Confession), 3 - Green Zone (I Will Make Love), 2 - Seunghun Shin (After A Long Separation), 1 - Noise (What I Wanted From You)
245	December 27, 2024	Can't You Come Back? Comeback Hopeful Idol Hit-Tsong	Guests: Hee-jin Lee, Kim E-Z (Baby Vox)	9 - M.I.L.K. (Come To Me), 8 - Sugar (Shine), 7 - Eagle Five (Squid Alien), 6 - Cleo (Good Time), 5 - F-iV (Girl), 4- Chakra (End), 3 - 1TYM (Kwaejina Ching Ching), 2 - S#arp/Shop (It's Okay), 1 - Baby Vox (Get Up)

=== 2025 ===
List of episodes in 2025 (episode 246–)

Episodes	Broadcast Date	Theme	Remark (s)	Featured Hit Songs
246	January 3, 2025	It's a Snake - Celebrate the Year of the Snake with Snake Zodiac Singers' Hit Songs	No guest(s)	10 - Park Ki Young (Start), 9 - J.ae (Time Out), 8 - Chae Jung-an (No Feelings), 7 - Psy (Bird), 6 - Park Mi-kyung (Eve's Warning), 5 - Kim Jong Seo (Plastic Syndrome), 4 - Lee Seung-hwan (A Heart for You), 3 - Kim Soo-hee (The Train to South), 2 - Songgolmae (Gather Around), 1 - Lee Mi-ja (Island Village Teacher)
247	January 10, 2025	Breathtaking! 10 Hit Songs by Legendary Dancers in the Music Industry.	No guest(s)	10 - Seven (Come Back To Me), 9 - Cheol I And Mi Ae (Ttukbokki Love), 8 - Turbo (Love Is (3+3=0)), 7 - BoA (My Name), 6 - Park Jin-young (She Was Pretty), 5 - H.O.T. (Descent Of Warriors), 4 - Clon (duo) (Nan), 3 - Deux (Break Off The Yoke), 2 - Hyun Jin-young (You Are In My Unclear Memory), 1 - Park Nam-Jung (Missing You)
248	January 17, 2025	The Timeless Peter Pan Voice That Reversed Time! Which singer is maintaining a voice that sounds like it's been preserved with a 'preservative'?!	No guest(s)	10 - Lee Sang -Woo (Where To Meet Her 100M Ago), 9 - Uhm Jung-hwa (Invitation), 8 - The Jadu (Goodbye), 7 - Song Chang-sik (We Are), 6 - Flower (Tears), 5 - Park Ji-yoon (Phantom), 4 - Seomoon Tak (Love, Never Fade), 3 - Kim Jung-min (Goodbye My Friend), 2 - YB (A Flying Butterfly), 1 - Lena Park (In Dreams)
249	January 24, 2025	Masterstroke! The Hit Song That Became the Turning Point in Life" From an unknown artist to a popular star?! From rocker to dance singer?!	No guest(s)	10 - Bobby Kim (A Whale's Dream), 9 - Eve (When You Do), 8 - Lee Yong'S (Forgotten Season), 7 - Cho Jang-Hyuk (Change), 6 - CAN (Spring Days Of My Life), 5 - jtL (A Better Day), 4 - Kim Jang-hoon (If You Are Like Me), 3 - Hong Kyung-min (Shaky Friendship), 2 - Kim Min-jong (Good Love), 1 - Kim Jung-Soo (You)
250	January 31, 2025	Diet Starts Today! Hit Songs To Help You Gain Weight Quickly - Fast BPM and upbeat rhythms that make your body move on its own!	No guest(s)	10 - GQ (Young Man), 9 - Jaeyoung Lee (Great You), 8 - Duke (Party Tonight), 7 - Molly (Transformation), 6 - Wax (Oppa), 5 - Hyunjung Kim (Farewell To Her), 4 - Tin Tin Five (Move Your Head), 3 - Koyote (Pure Love), 2 - Lee Jung-hyun (Half), 1 - Country Kko Kko (Gimme! Gimme!)
250	January 31, 2025	Diet Starts Today! Hit Songs To Help You Gain Weight Quickly - Fast BPM and upbeat rhythms that make your body move on its own!	No guest(s)	10 - GQ (Young Man), 9 - Jaeyoung Lee (Great You), 8 - Duke (Party Tonight), 7 - Molly (Transformation), 6 - Wax (Oppa), 5 - Hyunjung Kim (Farewell To Her), 4 - Tin Tin Five (Move Your Head), 3 - Koyote (Pure Love), 2 - Lee Jung-hyun (Half), 1 - Country Kko Kko (Gimme! Gimme!)
251	February 7, 2025	Ah~ the Refreshing Soda Hit Songs That Clear Up the Stress! - For Viewers Who Are Feeling Frustrated Due to Stress	No guest(s)	10 - Novasonic (Another sincerity), 9 - DJ DOC (Dances with DOC), 8 - Park Wan-kyu (The Name Of Desire), 7 - Crash (What Do You Really Want'), 6 - Lee Jung-hyun (Change), 5 - Kim Kyung-ho (Shout), 4 - Kim Soo-chul (Wake up), 3 - H.O.T. (Line up!), 2 - Seo Taiji (Regret of the Times), 1 - Crying Nut (Run The Horse)
252	February 14, 2025	Valentine's Day Special - Sweet Pumpkin Breakup Song - Hit Songs With Strong Breakup Lyrics Like "Let's Break Up!"	No guest(s)	10 - Uhm Jung-hwa (Dagara) 9 - SZ (SG) (Eraser(Born To Kill)) 8 - Sechs Kies (A Man's Path (Pom Saeng Pom Sa)) 7 - Lee Jung (Again) 6 - Lee Chae-yeon (Dangerous Directing) 5 - Baby Vox (Betrayal) 4 - Rottyful Sky (Gotta Be Kidding) 3 - Can (Garagara) 2 - Kim Hyun-jung - "Let Go" (Let Go) 1 - So Chan-whee (A Wise Choice)
253	February 21, 2025	Never-Ending Hit Songs of Musicians Who Became "Stars" – PART 2 - This episode continued to honor iconic Korean artists who have died but left a lasting impact on the music industry.	No guest(s)	10 - NRG Kim Hwan-sung (Making Love) 9 - Kim Min-ki (Morning Dew) 8 - Hwang Chi-hoon (The Girl In My Memories) 7 - Exhibition (Seo Dong-wook) (Etude Of Memory) 6 - SSAW (Jeon Tae-kwan) (Someone'S Dream) 5 - Two Two (Kim Ji-hoon) (Even Your Tears) 4 - Turtles (Turtleman) (The Four Seasons) 3 - Lee Young-hoon (The Girl) 2 - SKY (Choi Jin-young) (Forever) 1 - Kim Kwang-seok (With A Mind To Forget)
254	February 28, 2025	Star-Making Machine! The Favorite Singers of Singers – Hit-Song - The episode celebrates artists who are admired by other artists — essentially, singers who turned even their fellow musicians into fans.	No guest(s)	10 - Deux (Weak Man) 9 - Lee Tzsche (After You Left) 8 - Deulgukhwa (March) 7 - S.E.S. (Dreams Come True) 6 - Panic (Left-Handed) 5 - Kim Won-jun (A Short Promise) 4 - Jeon Yeong-Rok (Spark) 3 - The Blue (With You) 2 - Turbo (Twist King) 1 - Cho Yong-pil (Can'T Find The Oriole)
255	March 07, 2025	I Heard It Through the Grapevine! Singers Hit by Rumors – Hit-Song - This episode focuses on the darker side of fame — highlighting singers who were the targets of wild rumors and how those stories impacted their careers.	No guest(s)	10 - Psy (End) 9 - Ayumi (Cutie Honey) 8 - Uhm Jung-hwa (Poison) 7 - Fly to the Sky (Missing You) 6 - River basin (Purple Scent) 5 - Sim Soo-bong (Then That Person) 4 - g.o.d (Observe) 3 - Jang Na-ra (Is That Really) 2 - Kim Wan-sun (Masquerade) 1 - Namjin (With You)
256	March 14, 2025	I'll Buy Those Eyes That Saw It Live – Stages That Made the Audience Jealous – Hit-Song - This episode features super rare, legendary performances from the KBS archives, showcasing stages so iconic that fans say, “I wish I saw that live!”	No guest(s)	10 - Sinchon Blues (Close) 9 - Richard Marks (Right Here Waiting) 8 - Eun Ji-won (10 Minutes) 7 - 92 All -Star Band (Before It'S Too Late) 6 - Lee So-ra & Park Hyo-shin (Let's Not Forget) 5 - Seo Taiji and Boys (To You) 4 - Kim Kwang-seok (My Song) 3 - Lee Seung-hwan (Family) 2 - Kim Kyung-ho (Youth Gone Wild) 1 - Cho Yong-pil (Red Dragonfly)
257	March 21, 2025	Viewers’ PICK! Karaoke Final 1-Minute Hit-Songs - All about the ultimate last-minute karaoke bangers, as chosen by Hit-Song viewers themselves!	No guest(s)	10 - Cherry Filter (Romantic Cat) 9 - Choi Young -jun and labor firm (100 Great Men Who Made Korea Shine) 8 - Insooni (Night After Night) 7 - Now & New (Become One) 6 - Caterpillar (To You) 5 - Lee Moon-sae (A Flaming Sunset) 4 - Ahn Jae-wook (Chingu) 3 - Crying Nut (Let'S Run) 2 - Club Dance Medley (Run To You, Inside the Bus, Before You Get Sad, Tears) 1 - 015B (Goodbye Now)
258	March 28, 2025	April Fool's Day Special! 21st-Century Hit-Song - 21st-century 2nd-generation K-pop idol hits — a nod to the next era of nostalgia.	Oh Hyo-joo	10 - T-ara (Bo Peep Bo Peep) 9 - Shinee (Ring Ding Dong) 8 - 2PM (Heartbeat) 7 - TVXQ (Mirotic) 6 - Brown Eyed Girls (Abracadabra) 5 - 2NE1 (Fire) 4 - Kara (Mister) 3 - Girls' Generation (Gee) 2 - BigBang (Lies) 1 - Wonder Girls (Tell Me) 0 - Super Junior (Sorry, Sorry)
259	April 4, 2025	Lifelong Popularity! Never-Die Hit-Songs - timeless classics with songs that have stood the test of time — tracks that, even after 30 years, are still loved by people of all generations. From grandparents to grandchildren, these are the evergreen songs that continue to captivate hearts	Oh Hyo-joo	10 - Jinhee Choi (Labyrinth Of Love) 9 - peregrine falcon (I Love You All) 8 - Jungseok Lee (To Love) 7 - Nami (Round And Round) 6 - Xiamen Jo (This Night Once Again) 5 - Cho Yong-pil (Short Hair) 4 - Hyungwon Shin (Firefly) 3 - Moonse Lee (When Love Passes) 2 - Hyunsik Kim (Like Rain, Like Music) 1 - Jaeha Yoo (Because I Love You)
260	April 11, 2025	Unlock with Your Voice! Singers Whose Vocal Tones Are Their Fingerprints – Hit-Song - distinctive voices that are so unique, they can be recognized instantly, just like a fingerprint! These singers possess irreplaceable vocal tones that have made their songs unforgettable.	No guest(s)	10 - g.o.d (Road) 9 - KCM (singer) (Black And White Photo) 8 - S.E.S. (group) (Hugging Me) 7 - Cool (Interpretation Men And Women) 6 - Lee So-ra (Proposal Of Marriage) 5 - Janghoon Kim (Even If The World Deceives You) 4 - YB (Send You) 3 - Kim Jong-kook (One Man) 2 - Kim Gun-mo (On A Sleepless Night, It Rains) 1 - Lim Jaebum (Shrift)
261	April 18, 2025	Forced Summon! Forgotten Visual Singers – Hit-Song - forgotten visual stars — singers who were known for their stunning looks back in the day but somehow faded from the spotlight.	No guest(s)	10 - Soyoung Kwon (C.O.C (Choice Of Cinderella)) 9 - Kim Tae-hoo (Farewell) 8 - Dana (To The End Of The World) 7 - K-POP (K-pop) (Shadow) 6 - papaya (Listen To Me) 5 - Seok Hwang (Conclusion) 4 - team (I Love You) 3 - 5Tion (Ocean) (More Than Words) 2 - O-24 (Ottopo) (First Love) 1 - Taesaja (Do)
262	April 25, 2025	The Trick of Fate!? Singers Who Followed Their Song Titles – Hit-Song - strange coincidences in the music world, where singers’ lives seemed to follow the themes of their song titles in eerie ways.	No guest(s)	9 - A.R.T (Sad Face) 8 - Mr.2 (Empty Seats) 7 - Roo'ra (3! 4!) 6 - peregrine falcon (You Who Happened To Meet) 5 - S#arp (Tear) 4 - chyle (Love Is Always Thirsty) 3 - Cho Gap -kyung & Hong Seo -bum (My Love Toyou) 2 - green zone (Farewell Without Preparation) 1 - resurrection (Never Ending Story)

== Award ==
Name of organization, year given, and name of honor
Organization	Year	Honor	Ref
Korea Communications Standards Commission	2024	Special Award for Correct Broadcasting Language Ep. 234 "Hangul Day Special! Beautiful Lyrics Trend Songs"	
