= 1999 in South Korean music =

The following is a list of notable events and releases that happened in 1999 in music in South Korea.

== Debuting disbanded in 1999 ==
=== Debuting ===
- As One
- Bulldog Mansion
- Cleo
- Click-B
- Drunken Tiger
- Flower
- Fly to the Sky
- g.o.d
- Koyote
- Rux
- SM Town
- T.T.Ma
- YG Family

=== Solo debuts ===
- Baek Ji-young
- SKY
- Kim Bum-soo
- Kim Yeon-woo
- Lee Juck
- Lee Jung-hyun
- Park Hyo-shin
- Park Wan-kyu
- Seomoon Tak
- Shin Hae-chul
- Lee Soo-young
- You Hee-yeol

=== Disbanded groups ===
- Deulgukhwa
- R.ef

== Releases in 1999 ==
=== January ===
Date	Title	Artist	Genre(s)
13	Koyote Volume 1	Koyote	Hip hop
14	The Latter Half (후반)	Yoon Jong-shin	K-pop
15	In Stardom	Cho PD	Hip hop
23	Misery	Cool	K-pop
26	Chapter 1	g.o.d	K-pop

=== February ===
Date	Title	Artist	Genre(s)
2	Year of the Tiger	Drunken Tiger	Hip hop
22	A Seagull of Dream	Kim Hyun-jung	Dance, R&B
26	Six 'n Six	Roo'ra	Hip hop

=== March ===
Date	Title	Artist	Genre(s)
2	The War in Life	Lee Seung-hwan	Pop ballad
2	A Promise	Kim Bum-soo	K-pop
3	Taekwon V	Jinusean	K-pop
3	Cleo	Cleo	K-pop
3	Welcome To The Delihouse	Delispice	Rock
26	A Second Helping	Lena Park	Pop ballad
27	Funky Together	Clon	Dance music
29	Story Of...	Im Chang-jung	K-pop

=== April ===
Date	Title	Artist	Genre(s)
1	The Last	R.ef	Hip hop
8	The Theme of BY	Lee Ki-chan	R&B
15	T.O.P.	Shinhwa	K-pop
15	Now or Never	Yoo Seung-jun	K-pop, Hip hop
30	For 2000 AD	Kim Kyung-ho	Rock

=== May ===
Date	Title	Artist	Genre(s)
1	I Gatta Go	Rux	Punk rock
13	White	Fin.K.L	K-pop
19	In The Sea	T.T.Ma	K-pop

=== June ===
Date	Title	Artist	Genre(s)
26	《Dead End》	Lee Juck	K-pop
26	Addio	Yangpa	R&B, Ballad

=== July ===
Date	Title	Artist	Genre(s)
8	Millenium	Diva	K-pop
10	Sorrow	Baek Ji-young	K-pop
10	In Front of a Familiar House	Yoo Hee-yeol	Adult contemporary
15	Come Come Come Baby	Baby V.O.X	K-pop
29	Famillenium	YG Family	Hip hop

=== August ===
Date	Title	Artist	Genre(s)
1	Click-B 1st	Click-B	K-pop
8	The Age Ain't Nothing But a Number	Park Ji-yoon	K-pop
12	Kim Jo Han Vol. 2 (김조한 2집)	Johan Kim	K-pop
24	In Stardom Version 2.0	Cho PD	Hip hop

=== September ===
Date	Title	Artist	Genre(s)
1	For Your Soul	Jo Sung-mo	K-pop
9	Com'Back	Sechs Kies	K-pop
15	I Yah!	H.O.T.	K-pop

=== October ===
Date	Title	Artist	Genre(s)
1	Asura	Seomoon Tak	Rock
4	The S#arp+2	Sharp	K-pop
30	One Man Show	Lee Ki-chan	R&B

=== November ===
Date	Title	Artist	Genre(s)
1	Let's Go to My Star	Lee Jung-hyun	K-pop
4	NRG 003	NRG	K-pop
5	Circus Magic Clowns	Crying Nut	Punk rock
6	Koyotae 2nd	Koyote	K-pop
12	I Believe	Lee Soo-young	K-pop
15	Chapter 2	g.o.d	K-pop
17	Final Fantasy	SKY	K-pop
19	Growing	Kim Gun-mo	K-pop
23	Day by Day	As One	K-pop, R&B
25	Kiss In Christmas	NRG	K-pop
26	99 Crom Live & Homemade Cookies	Shin Hae-chul	Heavy metal
27	Love	S.E.S.	K-pop

=== December ===
Date	Title	Artist	Genre(s)
10	Over and Over	Yoo Seung-jun	Hip hop
14	Day by Day	Fly to the Sky	K-pop
15	Christmas in SMTOWN	SMTOWN	K-pop
17	Jinju`s Soul Music	Pearl	K-pop, R&B, Hip hop

== See also ==
- 1999 in South Korea
- List of South Korean films of 1999
