= Kim Min-ah =

South Korean television presenter

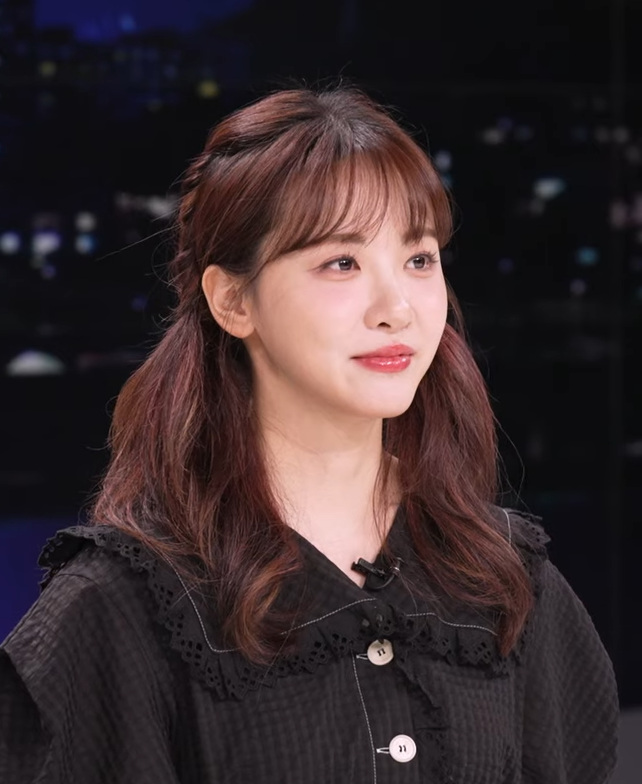
- Kim in 2024
- Born: February 1, 1991 (age 34); Anyang, Gyeonggi Province, South Korea
- Occupation: Broadcast personality
- Years active: 2016–present
- Agent: SM C&C

Korean name
- Hangul: 김민아
- Hanja: 金玟我
- RR: Gim Mina
- MR: Kim Mina

Kim Min-ah (Korean: 김민아; born February 1, 1991) is a South Korean television personality. She was JTBC's only weathercaster, hosting JTBC News Morning&'s weather segment from January 2016 to March 2020, and worked as a flight attendant for Asiana Airlines.

She signed with SM Culture & Contents on March 18, 2020.

She hosted the KBS show 20th Century Hit Song until 2024.

== Filmography ==
=== Television shows ===
Year	Title	Role	Network
2016-2020	JTBC News Morning& (Weather Segment)	Sub-anchor	JTBC
2017-2020	JTBC Golf Magazine-Progress	Sub-anchor	JTBC Golf&Sports
2020	Workman	Host	YouTube
2020	Cashback (pilot episodes only)	Host	tvN
2020	On & Off	Cast	tvN
2020–2024	20th Century Hit Song	Host	KBS
