= Kimchi Cheese Smile =

South Korean television series

- Promotional poster
- Hangul: 김치 치즈 스마일
- RR: Gimchi chijeu seumail
- MR: Kimch'i ch'ijŭ sŭmail
- Genre: Sitcom; Drama; Mystery
- Written by: Park Hye-ryun; Kim Yoon-hee; Kim Ki-ho; Lee Young-chul
- Directed by: Jeon Jin-soo; Kim Jun-hyeon
- Starring: Shin Goo
- Opening theme: "Happy Days" by Pratt & McCain
- Ending theme: "Undefined" by Epik High
- Country of origin: South Korea
- Original language: Korean
- No. of seasons: 1
- No. of episodes: 121

Production
- Production locations: Seoul, South Korea
- Running time: 30 minutes

Original release
- Network: MBC
- Release: 23 July 2007 – 18 January 2008

Kimchi Cheese Smile (Korean: 김치 치즈 스마일) is a South Korean sitcom revolving around the life of a kimchi-like (holding popular and conservative ideas) family headed by Shin Goo, who are to become in-laws to Sunwoo Eun-sook's cheese-like (rich and stylish) family. With contrasting classes and values, the sitcom follows these two families through various events in their lives.

== Cast and characters ==
- Shin Goo as Shin Goo

Husband of Eul-dong; Hye young, Byeong-jin, and Yeon-ji's father. He runs the Smile Photo studio and wants his family to make it big. He is full of bravado and often lies, but his dishonesty is always found out.

- Kim Eul-dong as Kim Eul-dong

Wife of Shin Goo, she lives very frugally. She does not like her in-laws.

- Lee Hye-young as Shin Hye-young

Eldest daughter of Shin goo and Eul-dong; she is a photographer and works at Smile Photo with her father.

- Lee Byeong-jin as Shin Byeong-jin

Son of Shin Goo and husband of Soo-young; he is a timid person and slow at everything.

- Yoo Yeon-ji as Shin Yeon-ji
  - Kim Bo-ra as young Shin Yeon-ji

Shin Goo's daughter; she has a fussy personality. She is Seo Woo's best friend and later becomes Hyun-jin's girlfriend.

- Sunwoo Eun-sook as Sunwoo Eun-sook

Mother-in-law of Byeong-jin. Though she is an elegant and cultured figure outwardly, she is quite the opposite on the inside.

- Jung Soo-young as Jung Soo-young

Eun-sook's daughter and wife of Byeong-jin; she studies the piano.

- Park Yoo-sun as Shin Wol-do

Daughter of Byeong-jin and Soo-young' she is mature for her age. She is close to her grandfather, Shin Goo, and likes Hyun Jin.

- Um Ki-joon as Um Ki-joon

Friend of Byeong-jin and brother of Hyun-jin; he works as an announcer and has poor relations with Eun Sook. He has moved back to Shin Goo's house and developed a relationship with Hye-young.

- Lee Hyun-jin as Uhm Hyun-jin

College swimmer and younger brother of Ki-joon; he lives in Shin Goo's house with Ki-Joon. He forms a relationship with Yeon-ji.

- Kim San-ho as Kim San-ho

An unidentified man; he moved to Shin Goo's house after Hye-young's car accident and works as an assistant at the photo studio.

- Jang Ji-woo as Jang Ji-woo

Friend and rival of Hyun-jin.

- Kim Soo-hyun as Kim Soo-hyun

College swimmer; a junior of Hyun-jin

- Choi Kwon as Choi Kwon

Friend of Hyun-jin; he is the captain of the swimming team.

Additional cast members

- Kim Ki-bang as chauffeur JungH

Eun-sook's driver and bodyguard

- Seo Woo as Seo Woo

A friend of Yeon-ji

- Oh Eun-chan as Shin Wol Sung
- Lee Ji-wan as Uhm Ji-Young
- Kim Ji-hoon as the doctor (ep. 70) and the journalist (ep. 83)
- Park Joo-yong
- Park Ji-hoon
