= Kim Ji-hoon (singer) =

- Born: May 5, 1973; Seoul, South Korea
- Died: December 12, 2013 (aged 40); Seoul, South Korea
- Cause of death: Suicide by hanging
- Education: Myongji College
- Occupations: Singer; songwriter; record producer; actor; television presenter; VJ
- Years active: 1990–2013
- Spouse: Divorced (2010)
- Children: Son (born in 2007)
- Musical career
- Genres: K-pop; Dance; Rock music; Hip hop
- Instruments: Vocals; piano; guitar
- Years active: 1990–2013
- Label: G.F. Entertainment
- Formerly of: Two Two; Gang; Duke

Korean name
- Hangul: 김지훈
- RR: Gim Jihun
- MR: Kim Chihun

Kim Ji-hoon (May 5, 1973 – December 12, 2013) was a South Korean singer, songwriter, record producer, actor, television presenter, and VJ. He is best known as the lead singer of Two Two, a popular Korean pop group from the mid-1990's. He is also known for being the lead singer of Duke, a Korean pop duo formed with Kim Suk-min, a former member of the New Two Two.

In the early 2000's, he grew popular for his appearances on talk shows and variety shows. Later in life, however, his career was marked by controversy, as he had been arrested for drug use in both 2005 and 2009. This led to him being sentenced to 10 months in prison and being placed on a list of banned actors by MBC TV. In 2010, his wife submitted her divorce papers to the Seoul Family Court, and they divorced after a three-month divorce deliberation period.

Kim Ji-hoon reportedly struggled with depression, and was receiving medication throughout his life. On December 12, 2013, he was found dead in his hotel room in Seoul, South Korea. His death was ruled a suicide by hanging.

== Death ==
On December 12, 2013, around 1 p.m. (KST), Kim was found dead, after hanging himself by the neck on a t-shirt wrapped around a shower stall, in his hotel room, by a younger acquaintance who had plans with him to eat lunch together that day.

== Early life ==
=== Educational background ===
- Seoul Buksung Elementary School
- Hanseong Middle School
- Seoul Inchang High School
- Myongji College (major in Practical Music)

== Discography ==
=== Regular albums ===
Two Two

- TWO TWO (a.k.a. 일과 이분의 일) (1994)
- TWO TWO 2 (1995)

Solo

- KIM JI HOON VOL. 1 (1997)

Duke

- 2000 Duke Part One (1999)
- Two House – Prism (2000)
- In Autumn (A Road, Sky And D.K) (2002)
- Pornography (2004)

=== Special edition ===
- Gang First Album (1998)
- Duke Summer Special (2001)
- Duke Story of Winter (Winter Special Great Hit Remix) (2002)
- The Rebirth of Duke (2006)
- Kim Ji Hoon Memorial album (김지훈 정식 추모앨범) (2014) : Even Teardrops in your Eyes (그대 눈물까지도) (Digital Single)

=== Compilation albums ===
- '90 KBS Youth Song Festival (KBS 청소년 창작가요제) (1991) : A Passed Moment Turn into the Broken Heart (지나간 순간은 찢겨진 가슴되어)
- '94 Tomorrow Will be Late (내일은 늦으리) (1994) : To the Beautiful World (아름다운 세상으로), The Cry of a Warrior (용사의 외침)
- Christmas of Roo'ra and Two Two (1994)
- Guardian angel (2001) : Guardian angel
- Dj처리의 Cross Over Vol. 1 (2001) : Last Night's Story, One Night Stand
- Happy Christmas Last Christmas (2001) : X-Mas Party (Feat. DJ 사빈, DJ 이탁)
- Stars on 45 Carol – 45 Celebrities who Honored Christmas (크리스마스를 빛낸 45인의 명사들) (2002) : Feliz Navidad
- I Love Christmas + Dance + Hiphop (2002) : White Christmas [Kim Ji-hoon, Seong-ho, So Chan-whee, As One, Lee Ji-hoon, Chae Ri-na, J.G, Cha Hee-mang]
- Kiss in the Rain (2004) : We Can Do, Love Hunters
- Golden Bride OST (2007) : I Love You (a.k.a. 사랑합니다)
- Lee Eun Ha, My Song My Jazz (2012) : You don't have to say you love me (Feat. Kim Ji-hoon)

== Filmography ==
=== Sitcom ===
Year	Title	Role
2001	Lipstick	housekeeper
2001	New Nonstop	Department of Vocal Music student Kim Ji-hoon (Cameo appearance)
2003	Nonstop 3	Kim Ji-hoon
2007	Kimchi Cheese Smile (Episode 70)	doctor (Cameo appearance)
2007	Kimchi Cheese Smile (Episode 83)	journalist (Cameo appearance)

=== Film ===
Year	Title	Role
2004	100 Days with Mr. Arrogant	Homeless

=== Musical ===
Year	Title	Role
2009	The Great Show (a.k.a. 위대한 Show)	Jo Dong-pal (North Korean military officer)

=== Advertising ===
Year	Company name	Product name
1994	Micro	Micro touch mechanical pencil
1994	Miko Fancy	Miko Fancy
1994	Lotte Confectionery	Gae-seong-pa candy bar
1994	Korea Cable Television Association (KCTA)	30 Channels of Cable television
2000	Orion Confectionery	Sae-al
2000	Orion Confectionery	Beatles

== Awards ==
Year	Awards name	Merit categories
1994	Korea Visual and Records Grand Prize Award	Newcomer Awards of the Year
1994	Seoul Music Awards	Rap/Dance Awards (The field of Rap/Dance field Great Prize)
1994	KBS Music Awards	Newcomer Awards of the Year
1994	Golden Disk	Main Prize (Bonsang Awards)
2002	The Most Popular Entertainment Awards in Korea (한국최고인기연예대상)	New generation Singer Awards (신세대가수상)
