= KBS N =

South Korean television network

KBS N Co., Ltd.
- Type: Public
- Industry: Media
- Founded: March 8, 2001
- Headquarters: Seoul, South Korea
- Products: Television (Non Free-to-air Channels)
- Owner: Korean Broadcasting System
- Parent: Korean Broadcasting System
- Website: www.kbsn.co.kr

KBS N Co., Ltd. (Korean: 주식회사 케이비에스엔) is a South Korean company owned by the Korean Broadcasting System, producing media, broadcast and telecommunication products for non free-to-air networks used under permission registered due to KBS in 1996, including KT SkyLife and Cable TV(KCTA) service providers.

== History ==
Sky KBS Co. Ltd. was founded on March 8, 2001.

== Television networks ==
- KBS Drama - drama's channel. Launched in 2002.
- KBS Joy - entertainment's channel. Launched in 2006.
- KBS N Sports - sports's channel. Launched in 2002.
- KBS Story - woman's channel. Launched in 2013.
- KBS Kids - children's channel. Launched in 2012.
- KBS Life - culture's channel. Launched in 2005.
- KBS N Plus - Life is an entertainment channel. Launched in 2017.

== See also ==
- List of South Korean companies
- Communications in South Korea
