= Two Two =

South Korean pop group

- Origin: South Korea
- Genre: K-pop
- Years active: 1994–1996
- Labels: Oasis (1994), BMG Korea (1995)
- Past members: Kim Ji Hoon (김지훈); Hwang Hye Young (황혜영); Oh Ji Hoon (오지훈); Yoo Hyun Jae (유현재); See band members section for others

Two Two (투투) was a Korean pop group during the mid-1990s. They garnered great popularity with their hit debut single "One and a half" (일과 이분의 일).

== History ==
Oh Ji-hoon (Korean: 오지훈) and Yoo Hyun-jae (Korean: 유현재) became friends in 1987 when they were in Seo-un middle school (Korean: 서운중학교), and the two participated in school bands together. When the main vocalist withdrew from the rock band to which they belonged, Kim Ji-hoon (Korean:김지훈) was introduced in 1991 with the introduction of an acquaintance close to Yoo Hyun-jae, and Kim Ji-hoon was recruited as a vocalist. The three entered Myongji College (Korean: 명지전문대학) in 1992 and continued exchanges while working as an underground rock band. In the summer of 1993, Oh Ji-hoon and Yoo Hyun-jae conceived a group on Jeju Island and formed a group with Kim Ji-hoon in 1994. Two Two was originally to debut as a 3-member boy band called "Traffic Light." The group name was changed to "Two Two" because it consisted of three men aged 22 in Korean age. Lee Yoon-jung (Korean: 이윤정), who is the same age as them, participated in this album as a female vocalist.

Oh Ji-hoon made all the songs on Two Two's debut album. They originally prepared to debut with a male vocalist's solo song. After completing the album, at the suggestion of the agency's president, they changed their debut song to one in which a female vocalist also participated. However, Lee Yoon-jung was unable to perform on television broadcasts due to the opposition of her father. For this reason, female member Hwang Hye Young (Korean: 황혜영) joined as a guest member. She was also 22 years old, the same age as the male members.

In the Two-Two album, Kim Ji-hoon's powerful voice and outstanding singing ability were in the spotlight, and Oh Ji-hoon's ability to make all the songs was also highlighted. In the summer of 1994, Hwang Hye-young's bobbed-hair wigs, bright stage costumes, and the knapsacks she carried on her shoulders were popular among South Korean girls. The song won first place in a Korean music program. Two Two's debut album reached the top in terms of album sales in August 1994. Two Two won awards the honor of the Rookie of the Year award in 1994.

In fact, Hwang Hye-young lip-synced the female vocal part to the song sung by Lee Yoon-jung and worked on a remix version recorded with Hwang Hye-young's voice from July to December 1994. As the album sold a lot, it was replaced with a photo taken by four people, including Hwang Hye-young, and a new version of the album was released in the summer of 1994. However, For the new version of the album, only the cover photo changed, and the contents were the same as the first edition. In addition, during promotions for the song, Hwang Hye-young lip-synced to Lee Yoon-jung's voice in most activities, so she was criticized for "A singer on stage lip-synced the song which was sung by other person."

Two Two disbanded when leader Oh Ji-hoon served as a Public Service personnel(Korean: 공익근무요원, 公益勤務要員) in 1995 and Yoo Hyun-jae joined the army recruit training center on December 26, 1994. In addition, guest singer Hwang Hye-young moved to another agency in January 1995 because her contract expired on December 31, 1994.

In 1995 Yoo Hyun-jae served as 방위병(防衛兵) and Oh Ji-hoon started serving as a Public Service personnel(Korean: 공익근무요원, 公益勤務要員) in May 1995, Kim Ji-hoon was left alone in the group. Two Two's agency, Fitness (휘트니스), renewed its contract with Hwang Hye-young, who began activities as an actress in 1995. Two Two reorganized Kim Ji-hoon as the leader and main vocalist. In addition, Hwang Hye-young, Lim Sung-eun (Korean: 임성은), and Kim Jun (Korean: 김준), were established as guest singers. Two Two resumed broadcasting activities in July 1995.

The title song of the second album 《TWO TWO 2》, female singer parts of 'Unfaithful Woman (Korean: 바람난 여자)' and 'One and a half(English version)' were recorded in Lee Yoon-jung's voice. Even a remix version of an unfaithful woman that was not included in the album was recorded in Lee Yoon-jung's voice. Lee Yoon-jung participated in 1999 as a female vocalist in Duke's first album.

As Kim Ji-hoon worked as a Public Service personnel(Korean: 공익근무요원, 公益勤務要員) since January 1996, Two Two disbanded again. In 1996, a New Two Two was formed with Hwang Hye-young, Kim Suk-min(Korean: 김석민), Kim Jin(Korean: 김진), and Kim Jae-woo(Korean: 김재우) as members.

Kim Ji-hoon, the main vocalist of Two Two, and Kim Suk-min, a rapper of New Two Two, formed a male duo group Duke in 1999 and worked as a Duke until June 1, 2007.

== Members ==
- Kim Ji Hoon (김지훈, Vocals) (1994-1996; died 2013)
- Lee Yoon-jung (Vocals) (1994-1995)
- Hwang Hye-young (황혜영, Guest Vocalist) (1994-1996)
- Oh Ji-hoon(오지훈, Leader, Vocals, Guitarist, Keyboardist, Record producer, Composer, Lyricist) (1994-1995)
- Yoo Hyun-jae (유현재, Bass player)
- Lim Sung-eun (임성은, Guest Vocalist) (1995)
- Kim Jun (김준, Guest Vocalist) (1995)
- Kim Suk-min (김석민) (1996)
- Kim Jin (김진) (1996)
- Kim Jae-woo (김재우) (1996)

== Discography ==
=== Studio albums ===
Title	Album details
Two Two	Released: May 1, 1994; Label: Oasis Records; Format: LP, CD, cassette tape; Track listing: 1. 일과 이분의 일 (One And A Half); 2. 내 인생의 러시 아워; 3. 너의 눈에 슬픈 비가 내리고 [Version 1.0]; 4. 너의 눈에 슬픈 비가 내리고 [Version 2.0]; 5. 그대 눈물까지도 (Even Tear Drops In Your Eyes); 6. 홀로 지낸 기억; 7. 재수생; 8. 음주 운전
Two Two 2	Released: June 30, 1995; Label: BMG, RCA; Format: LP, CD, cassette tape; Track listing: 1. 바람난 여자; 2. 니가 내것이 되갈수록; 3. 미소를 띄우며 나를 보낸 그 모습처럼; 4. 어색한 미소; 5. 고백; 6. 널 위한 노래; 7. 잃어버린 너 8. Ben; 9. Even Tear Drops In Your Eyes [English ver.]; 10. One And A Half [English ver.]
New Two Two	Released: May 1, 1996; Label: Samsung Entertainment; Format: CD, cassette tape; Track listing: 1. 최면속에서; 2. 이미지; 3. Hero; 4. 약오르지; 5. 아침; 6. 외면; 7. 넌 내게로 그리고 난 8. 잃어버린 너 9. 프롤로그
