= Na-mi =

- Born: Gim Myeong-ok; October 9, 1957 (age 69); Dongducheon, Gyeonggi Province, South Korea
- Genre: Dance pop
- Occupation: Singer
- Years active: 1967–present

Korean name
- Hangul: 김명옥
- RR: Gim Myeongok
- MR: Kim Myŏngok

Gim Myeong-ok (Korean: 김명옥; born October 9, 1957), better known by the stage name Na-mi (나미), is a South Korean singer. She was considered a "superstar" and "icon" of Korean pop music in the 1980s and early 1990s.

== Discography ==
=== Studio albums ===
- I Loved You / I Like You (난 사랑했어요 / 좋아해) (1980)
- International Waiting Room / Always (국제선 대합실 /언제까지나) (1981)
- Na-mi '83 (1983)
- Na-mi Vol. 4 (1984)
- Overture (1987)
- I Won't Say a Thing / Is This Hate or Longing? (아무말 않으리 / 미움인지 그리움인지) (1989)
- Chameleon (1992)
- A Long Winter (1996)

== Awards ==
Year	Award	Category	Nominated work	Result	Ref.
1987	Golden Disc Awards	Main Prize (Bonsang)	"Love is a Strange Thing"	Won	
1990	Golden Disc Awards	Main Prize (Bonsang)	"Like an Indian Doll"	Won	
