= Lee Ki-chan =

South Korean singer and actor (born 1979)

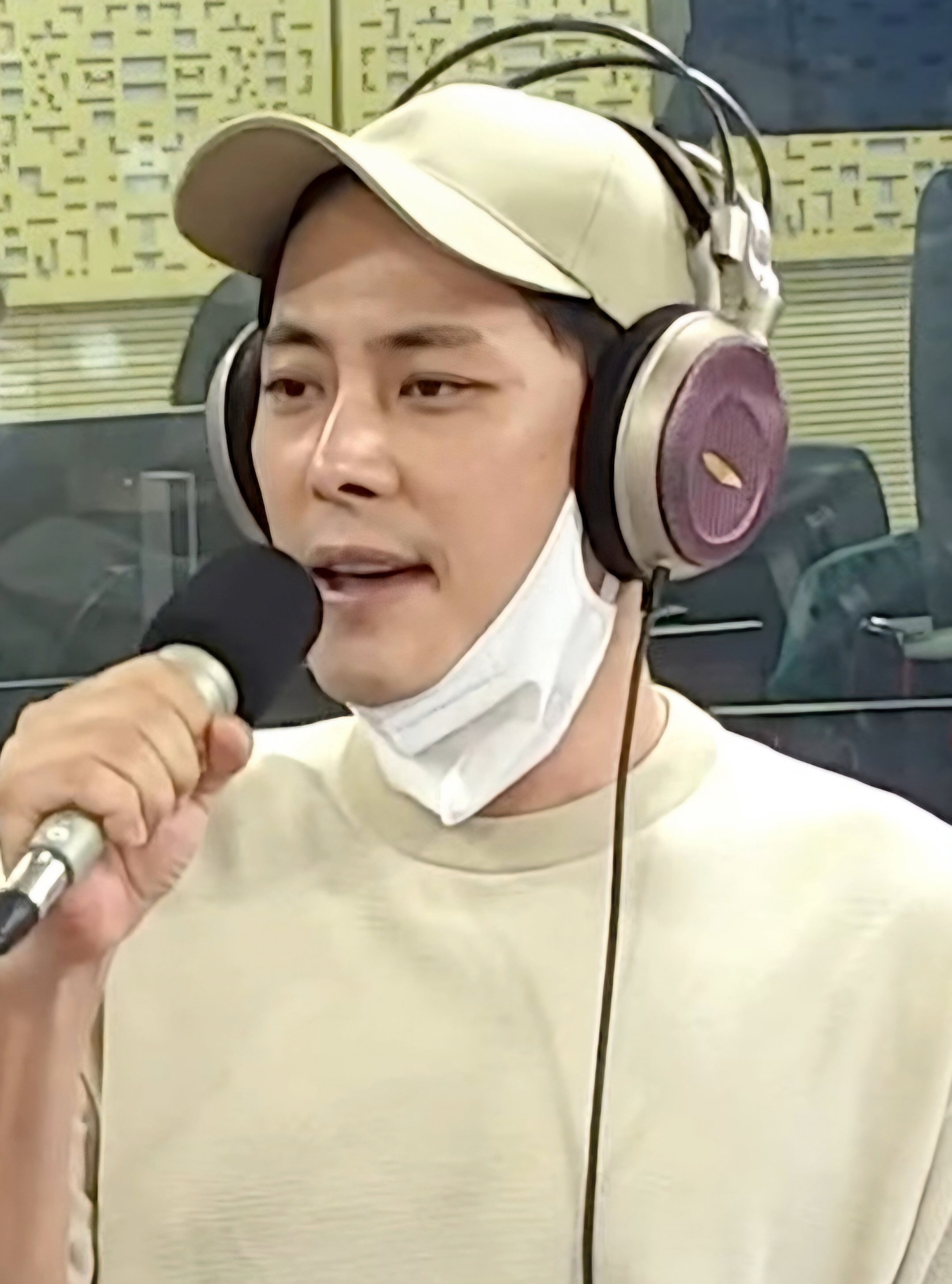
- Lee in 2021

Background information
- Born: January 10, 1979 (age 47); Seoul, South Korea
- Genres: R&B, pop
- Occupations: Singer-songwriter; actor
- Years active: 1996–present

Korean name
- Hangul: 이기찬
- Hanja: 李基燦
- RR: I Gichan
- MR: I Kich'an

Lee Ki-chan (Korean: 이기찬; born January 10, 1979) is a South Korean singer and actor. He debuted as a singer in 1996, and began acting in 2006. He has appeared in several Korean dramas, as well as the American TV series Sense8.

== Biography ==
Lee Ki-Chan made his debut as a singer when he was a high school student. In 1996, Lee took part in a talent contest held during a radio show and won the grand prize. Since then, Lee developed his career as a professional singer. At the time of Lee's debut, the Korean pop music world was dominated by dance music, but Lee Ki-Chan received attention for his soft ballads. Having undergone musical training by Han Yong-Jin, a renowned re-mix DJ, Lee Ki-Chan released his first album entitled "Na Na Na Na Nineteen." In three months after its release, 220 thousand copies were sold. The song "Please" was the most popular among its tracks. In November of the same year, Lee released his second album entitled "Indelible Impression." In his third album, Lee Ki-Chan took it upon himself to produce his songs. As a result, the album reflected Lee's personality and characteristics. One of Lee's most successful songs came later in his fifth album, released in 2001. This song, "Another Love Goes Away," was written by Park Jin-Young.

Lee continued to produce hit songs on his next two albums. The song "Cold" (sixth album) spent many weeks on top of the chart, and the song "Repeatedly" (seventh album) was considered one of his very best songs. However, Lee Ki-Chan suffered a financial setback on his eighth album in 2004, when he tried to venture into more high-tempo songs. He selected the dance song "I'm Nothing Without You" as the title song and did not see much success. After that, Lee spent three years on hiatus. He decided to go back to ballads as in his ninth album, "Para Ti." The title song "A Beauty" was again a hit.

He attended the Seoul Arts College and Kyunghee University.

== Discography ==
=== Studio albums ===
Title	Album details	Peak chart positions	Sales
Title	Album details	KOR	Sales
Na Na Na Na Nineteen	Released: December 27, 1996; Label: Cino Records, m-people; Formats: CD, cassette	No data	No data
Indelible Impression	Released: October 25, 1997; Label: A.R. Media (Anam Records); Formats: CD, cassette	No data	No data
The Theme of BY	Released: April 8, 1999; Label: A.R. Media (Anam Records), Rock Records Korea; Formats: CD, cassette	24	KOR: 20,209+
One Man Show	Released: November 30, 1999; Label: Polydor, Seoul Records, Universal Music Korea; Formats: CD, cassette	—	—N/a
New Story	Released: August 30, 2001; Label: Yuri Entertainment, YBM Seoul Records; Formats: CD, cassette	2	KOR: 359,019+
New Story II	Released: November 12, 2002; Label: Yuri Entertainment, YBM Seoul Records; Formats: CD, cassette	6	KOR: 128,748+
Natural	Released: September 29, 2003; Label: Yuri Entertainment, YBM Seoul Records; Formats: CD, cassette	10	KOR: 40,472+
I'm Nothing Without You (그대없이 난 아무것도 아니다)	Released: October 4, 2004; Label: WMF Entertainment, YBM Seoul Records; Formats: CD, cassette	15	KOR: 16,623+
Para Ti	Released: February 2, 2007; Label: How Entertainment, Manine Media, Manwalldang Music Entertainment; Formats: CD	—	—N/a
Singing All My Song For You	Released: July 10, 2008; Label: How Entertainment, Vitamin Entertainment, Warner Music Korea; Formats: CD	No data	No data

=== Compilation albums ===
- Best (2001)

=== Soundtrack appearances ===
- 2012: "Shout" – MBC Arang and the Magistrate OST Part 9
- 2012: "아픈 희망" (Sick of Hope) – KBS Dream High 2 OST Part 5
- 2012: "아니기를" – MBC Moon Embracing the Sun OST Part 5
- 2014: "Meet You Now" – SBS Doctor Stranger OST Part 2

== Filmography ==
=== Television ===
Title	Year	Role	Ref.
South Korean
Real School	2011	Teacher	
Pretty! Oh Man-bok	2014	Han Joon	
Into the Flames	2014	Ahn Seung-joo	
Twenty Again	2015	Radio DJ (cameo)	
Ready for Start	2016	Song Chi-sam	
Still Loving You	2016	Sin Jae-min	
How Are U Bread	2020	Jo Yeon-chul	
My Holo Love	2020	Yeon Gang-woo	
Hyena	2020	Kwon Yong-Woon	
American
Sense8	2015–17	Joong-Ki	

=== Film ===
Title	Year	Role	Ref.
South Korean
Like Father, Like Son	2008	Byeong-tae	

== Awards and nominations ==
Year	Award	Category	Work	Result
2007	Mnet Asian Music Awards	Best Ballad Performance	"Beautiful Woman"	Nominated
