= R.ef =

South Korean boy band

- Origin: South Korea
- Genres: K-pop; Hip-hop
- Years active: 1995-1999, 2004 (on hiatus)
- Members: Lee Sung Wook; Park Chul Woo; Sung Dae Hyun

R.ef was a boyband trio in South Korea. Their main genres were K-pop and hip-hop.

== History ==
In 1995, 21-year-old singer Lee Sung Wook (이성욱), 25-year-old rapper Park Chul Woo (박철우) and 21-year-old singer Sung Dae Hyun (성대현) formed R.ef as a trio.

The group's first album was released in 1995 and contained singles including Farewell Formula, Heartbreak and Silent Scream.

Then the trio released their second album in 1996, titled Back to the Black. The separately-released singled on the album include Luminous Love and Walking Into Your Heart.

Later in 1996, their third album, Memories in Fall, was released.

In 1998, R.ef moved away from rave music and began to produce hip-hop music. To reflect their change of genre, the group was renamed from R.ef (Rave effect) to REF (Ruff Eazy Flava).

The group disbanded in 1999 but briefly re-formed to release a single on August 13, 2004, called Love is Hard. The group planned to release a fourth album in 2015 after their almost 17-year hiatus but no releases have been made as of January 2017.

== Discography ==
=== Studio albums ===
| Title | Album details |
|---|---|
| Rave Effect | Released: March 14, 1995; Label: King Record; Format: LP, CD, cassette tape |
| Back to the Black | Released: April 15, 1996; Label: King Record; Format: LP, CD, cassette tape |
| Memories in Fall | Released: September 1, 1996; Label: King Record; Format: LP, CD, cassette tape |
| Ruff Eazy Flava | Released: September 1, 1997; Label: King Record, Team Entertainment; Format: LP, CD, cassette tape |
| R.ef: Forever | Released: May 1, 1998; Label: King Record; Format: LP, CD, cassette tape |
| R.ef: The Last | Released: May 5, 1999; Label: Team Entertainment, Palette Music; Format: LP, CD, cassette tape |

=== Single ===
- Love is Hard (2004)

== Awards ==
| Year | Award | Category | Nominated work | Result | Ref. |
|---|---|---|---|---|---|
| 1995 | Golden Disc Awards | Main Award (Bonsang) | "Silent Scream" | Won | |
| 1995 | Seoul Music Awards | Main Award (Bonsang) | — | Won | |
| 1996 | Seoul Music Awards | Main Award (Bonsang) | — | Won | |
