= Seomoon Tak =

South Korean singer (born 1978)

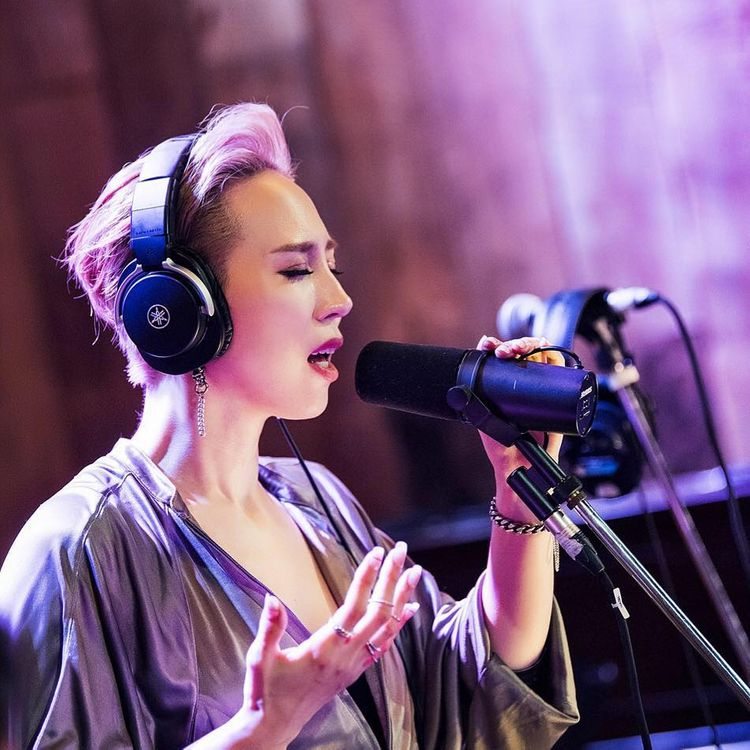
- Born: March 3, 1978 (age 47); Seoul, South Korea
- Education: Berklee College of Music – Music Production & Engineering; Korea University - Sociology
- Occupations: Singe; musician; songwriter; actress; entrepreneur
- Years active: 1999–present
- Agent: Rocking Entertainment

Korean name
- Hangul: 서문탁
- Hanja: 西門卓
- RR: Seomun Tak
- MR: Sŏmun T'ak
- Website: seomoontak.com

Signature
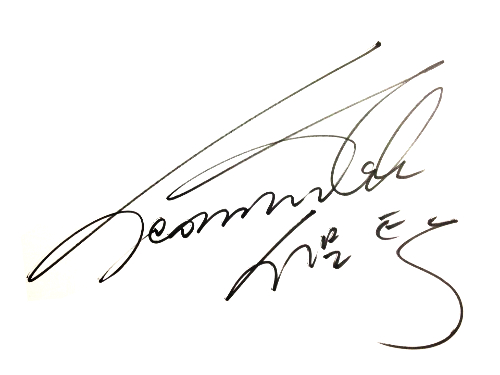

Seomoon Tak (born March 3, 1978), sometimes known mononymously as Tak, is a South Korean singer, noted for her powerful voice and technically skilled wide vocal range. Her debut album Asura has been among the top 20 popular karaoke songs in South Korea for more than 20 years. In 2002, she participated in the Red Devils Cheer, the support album for the South Korea national football team at the 2002 FIFA World Cup.

== Biography ==
Seomoon Tak is an alumna of Berklee College of Music in Boston, Massachusetts, and majored in music production and engineering. She debuted in 1999 and sold her first album, Asura, over 300,000 copies and her second album, Seomoon Tak II, over 300,000 copies. After she debuted in South Korea, she regularly had more than 1,000 live performances per year, and radio and TV shows appearances. She released 6 studio albums (Korean), 2 studio albums (Japanese), and 2 single albums, and recorded multiple movie and television soundtracks. Marty Friedman, the guitarist of Megadeth, also featured her second Japanese album.

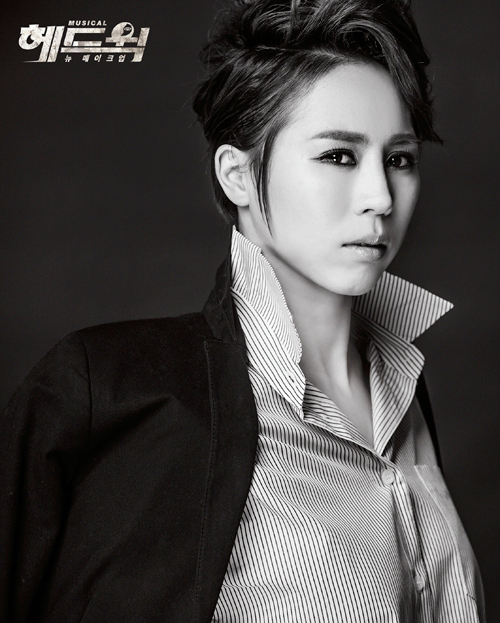
Seomoon Tak plays in Hedwig and the Angry Inch (musical) as Yitzhak

Besides her recordings, she was cast as Yitzhak, the musical Hedwig and the Angry Inch and Acid Queen, and the musical The Who's Tommy in both Korea and Japan for many years. She is the first and only Asian Berklee student who was selected to perform for both "Singer's Night" and "Singer's Showcase" in front of over a thousand audiences at Berklee Performance Center for multiple times.

In 2012, she appeared on the South Korean singing competition television show I Am a Singer 2. She survived for five months until the final round of the season.

Upon the release of her second single in summer 2013, she started a project band, Seomoon Tak Band, which held several concerts in South Korea. Seomoon Tak has been performing in small and large venues around the world, including the latest performances in 2022 in New York City and New Orleans.

In 2022, Seomoon Tak co-founded the TAK Company, an entertainment, food and beverage servicing company in the U.S. to promote Korean culture and entertainment.

In 2024, Seomoon Tak sang lead on "The Ballad of the Witches' Road (Lorna Wu's Version)" for Marvel Studios' series Agatha All Along. Lorna Wu was lead singer of the 1970s rock band Lorna Wu and the Coral Shore and mother of blood witch Alice Wu-Gulliver, played by Ali Ahn.

== Discography ==
Year	Album title	Title Song
1999	Asura	Love, that never fades... 사랑, 결코 시들지 않는...
2000	Seomoontak II	Chain 사슬
2001	Sudden Death	All you need is love 사미인곡(思美人曲)
2004	Now Here	You more than you 난 너보다 널
2005	Pianissima	Even if I laugh, I cry 웃어도 눈물이 나
2007	Leap of Truth	Leave My Love 가거라 사랑아
2009	Victoria	Victoria
2013	Corona	Corona 코로나
2014	The Seventh Spring	The Seventh Spring 일곱 번째 봄
2015	U & I	
2015	Love, Whatever	
2019	Seomoon Tak Best Studio Live Concert	

== Television appearances ==
- National Singer (TvN) (2022)
- Immortal Songs (Season 2) (KBS)
  - I wanna dance with somebody (2022)
  - I look to you (2022)
  - Believer (feat. SF9 Inseong) (2021)
  - Desperado (2021)
  - The Power Of Love (2021)
  - I Was Born To Love You (2019)
- Immortal Songs I (KBS)
  - International Music Festival (2015)
  - Seven Divas Special (2015) Final Winner
  - To My Baby (Koo Chang Mo) (2015)
  - Mona Lisa (2014)
- Concert 7080 (KBS) 2015
- Open Concert (KBS) 2015
- 100 Songs (JTBC) 2015
- King of Mask Singer (MBC) (episodes 63, 64)
- Singing Battle (Moontak was a Hidden Card)(KBS) (2016)
- I Am A Singer (Season 2)
  - Singer of October (MBC) (2012)
  - Love Rain (MBC) (2012)

== See also ==
- Contemporary culture of South Korea
- Korean music
