= Flower (South Korean band) =

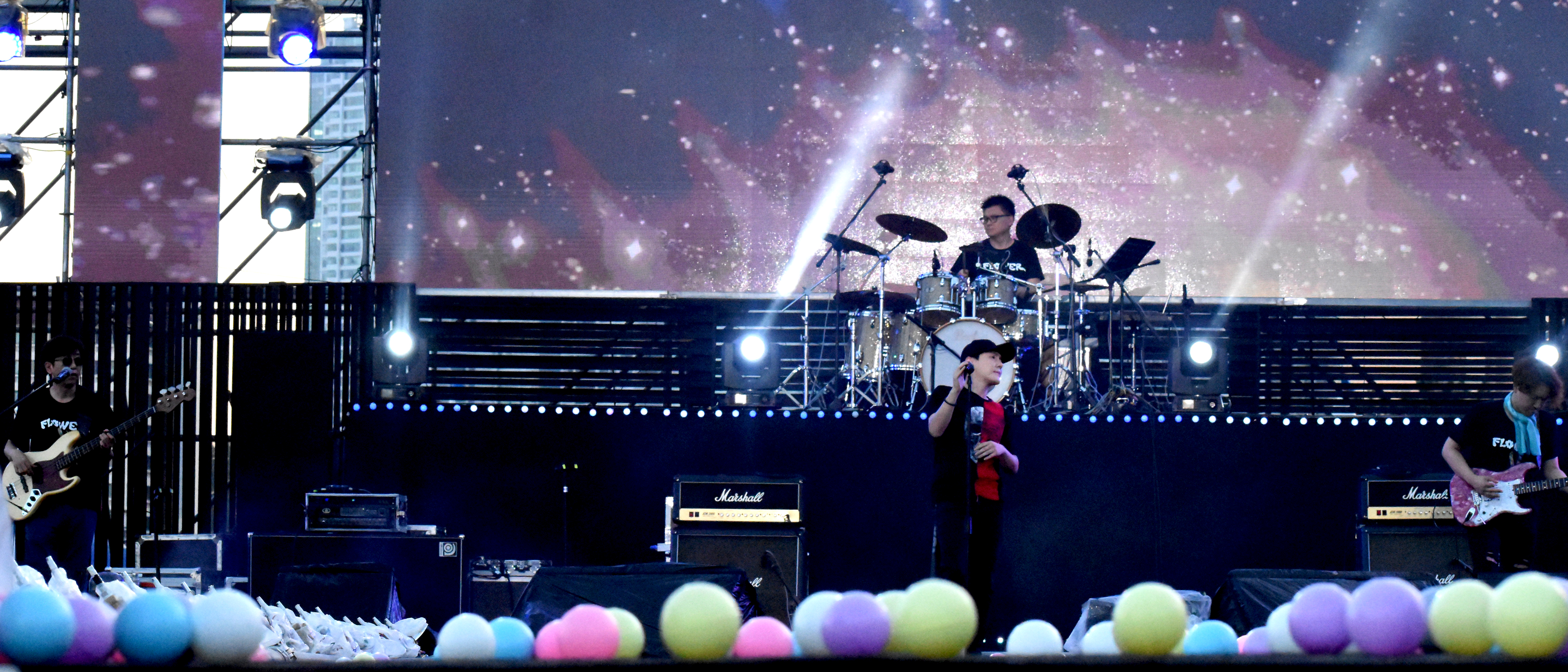
- Flower at the Busan Sea Festival, August 2018

Background information
- Origin: South Korea
- Genres: Pop rock
- Years active: 1999–2006, 2010–present
- Labels: Nuts Media
- Members: Ko Yoo-jin; Kim Woo-di; Ko Sung-jin
- Past members: Jeon In-hyuk

Flower is a South Korean pop rock band. They are well known for their hit song "Endless", from their mini album titled "소품집: (해룡의 Sad Love Story...)", released in 2000.

== Discography ==
=== Album ===
- Tears (1999)
- Bloom (2000)
- Bandlife (2001)
- Flower 4th (2005)
- Flower Tunes (2010)
