= Bongpyeong-myeon =

- Township
- Location of Daegwallyeong-myeon in South Korea
- Coordinates: 37°36′50.90″N 128°22′40.58″E
- Country: South Korea
- Province: Gangwon-do
- County: Pyeongchang
- Administrative divisions: 19 ri

Area
  - Total: 217.41 km^{2} (83.94 sq mi)

Population (2008)
  - Total: 5,545
- Time zone: UTC+9 (Korea Standard Time)

Korean name
- Hangul: 봉평면
- Hanja: 蓬坪面
- RR: Bongpyeong-myeon
- MR: Pongp'yŏng-myŏn

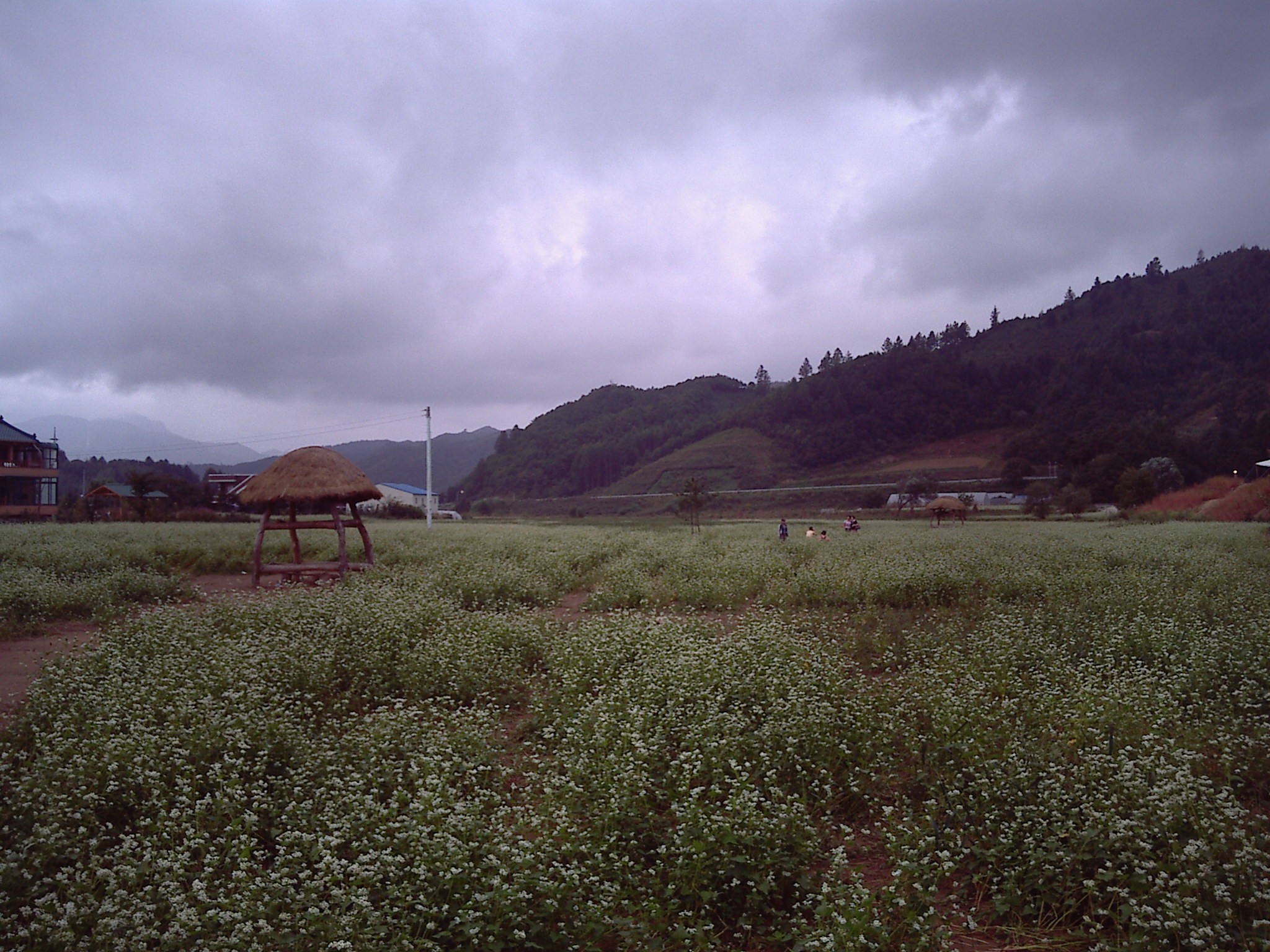
field in Bongpyeong

Bongpyeong-myeon (Korean: 봉평면) is a myeon (township) in the county of Pyeongchang in the province of Gangwon-do, South Korea. The myeon is located in northwestern part of the county. The total area of Bongpyeong-myeon is 217.41 square kilometers, and, as of 2008, the population was 5,545 people.

The town is the setting of the When Buckwheat Flowers Bloom (1936) short story by Lee Hyo-seok, and its buckwheat fields are considered to be a major tourist attraction.

== Attractions ==
- Bogwang Phoenix Park: venue of 2018 Winter Olympics
- Mount Taegisan
- Phoenix Park: It offers an extensive selection, as well as ski and snowboard instruction for beginner skiers
