= Wang Su-bok =

North Korean folk singer (1917–2003)

Wang Su-bok 왕수복

Background information
- Born: 5 March 1917; Kōtō, South Heian Province, Japanese Korea
- Died: 1 June 2003 (aged 86) Pyongyang, North Korea
- Genres: Folk
- Occupations: Singer, Kisaeng
- Instrument: Voice
- Partners: Yi Hyoseok; Kim Kwang-jin

Korean name
- Hangul: 왕수복
- Hanja: 王壽福
- RR: Wang Subok
- MR: Wang Subok

Wang Su-bok (Korean: 왕수복, Korean pronunciation: [waŋsʰubok̚]; 5 March 1917 – 1 June 2003) was a singer from North Korea, who was the most popular singer in Japanese-occupied Korea in 1935.

She was credited as a ground-breaking female artist, whose work led the way for the modern K-pop phenomenon.

== Biography ==
Born in 1917, Wang Su-bok studied at the Chosen Dancing Girls School in Pyongyang, which specialised in kisaeng training. This trained girls in singing, dancing, musicianship and costume. She graduated in 1931. Her debut as a kisaeng singer came in 1933, and she was very popular during the rest of the decade. One of Wang's most popular songs was Ulchi marayo (Don't Cry). One of the styles in which she sang was kinminyo, a traditional folk style. She was signed to both Columbia and Polydor Records. Others who were popular at the same time were Lee Eun-pa and the Jeogori Sisters.

In January 1934, Wang was featured in the first live Korean language radio broadcast to Japan. The transmission was organised by the Japanese Broadcasting Corporation, and she was accompanied by Kyongsong Broadcasting Orchestra. Wang won a popularity contest for singers in 1935, organised by Samcheolli Co. As of November of the same year, she was the number one most popular female singer in Korea.

In 1936, when she was at the peak of her popularity, Wang was known as the 'Queen of Popular Songs'. She moved to Japan to study Western music, training as a mezzo-soprano singer who sang mostly Joseon folk songs in Western vocal style. In an interview at the time, she said, "I want to sing a lot of Joseon folk songs, just as Choi Seung-hee saved Joseon dance." The Japanese, who had colonised Korea, tried to preclude the use of the Korean language in folk music, so Wang ended her musical career for some time in 1942. She resumed her singing career with the Central Radio Broadcasting Commission in 1953, and by 1955, she had become a vocalist for the National Symphony Orchestra of North Korea.

On her 60th birthday in 1977, Kim Il Sung sent her a birthday gift. For her 80th birthday in 1997, Kim Jong Il sent her a birthday present. She died in 2003.

== Awards ==
In 1959, she was awarded the title of Merited Actor of the Democratic People's Republic of Korea.

== Legacy ==
Wang Su-bok featured in a book and exhibition and by Choi Kyu-sung, entitled Ancestors of Girl Groups which described the women who were some of Korea's first singers and heralded the popularity of K-pop girl groups in the country.

== Personal life ==
Wang was a partner of the novelist Yi Hyoseok, who she met in her sister's coffeehouse in Pyongyang. She later married the economist Kim Kwang-jin, who in turn was former partner of the poet No Chun-myeong.
