= Phoenix Pyeongchang =

South Korean ski resort

Coordinates: 37°34′48″N 128°19′13″E

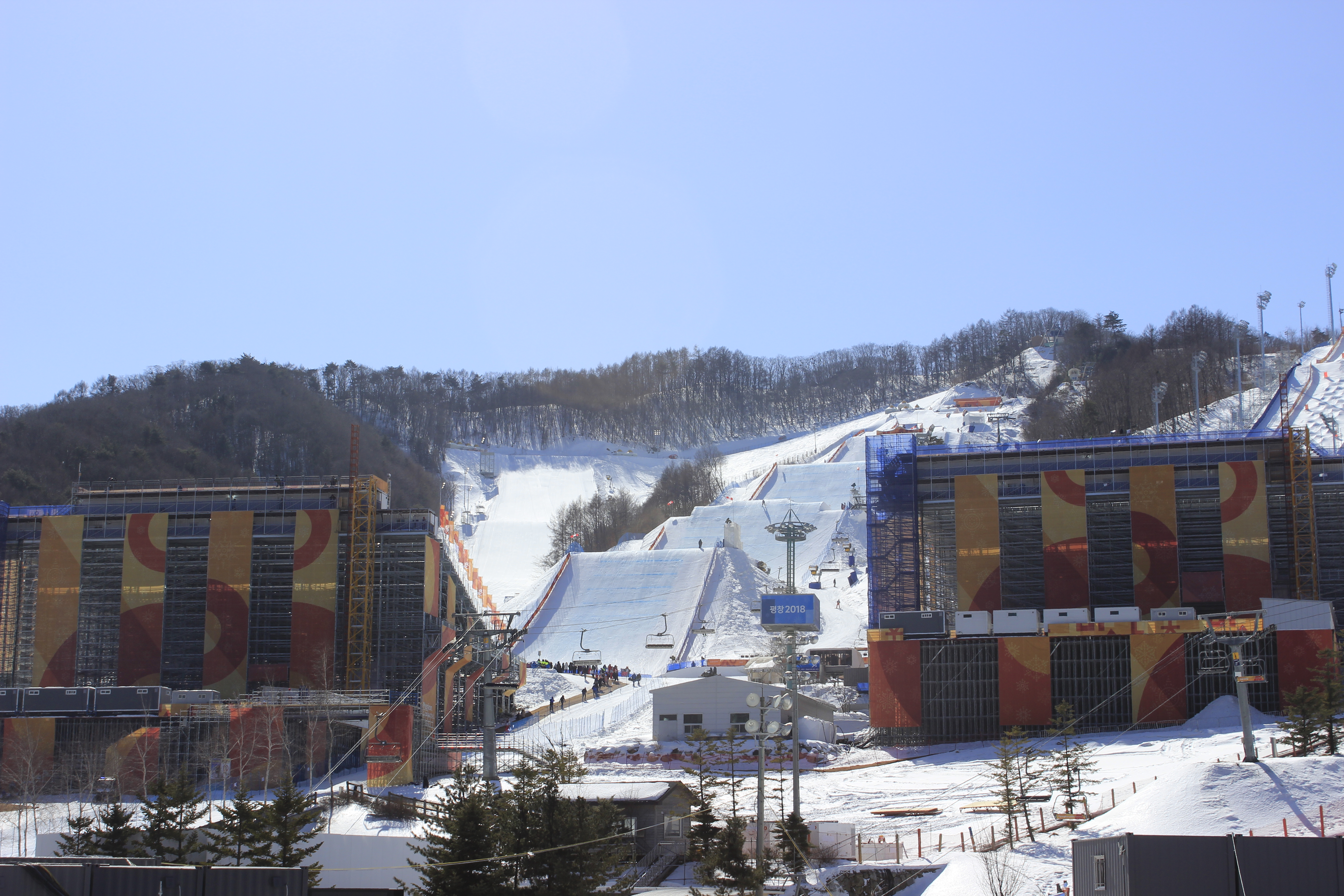
Phoenix Pyeongchang slope

Phoenix Pyeongchang (Korean: 휘닉스 평창), also known as Phoenix Snow Park or Bokwang Snow Park, is a ski resort in South Korea. It is located in the township of Bongpyeong-myeon, in the county of Pyeongchang.

It was the venue for the freestyle skiing and snowboarding events in the 2018 Winter Olympics and the 2018 Winter Paralympics.

The capacity of the venue is 18,000 (10,200 seated and 7,800 standing).

It is one of the locations where the television drama Autumn in My Heart was shot.
