= K-pop =

South Korean popular music genre

- Stylistic origins: Trot; pop; dance; contemporary R&B; hip-hop; rock
- Cultural origins: 1990s, South Korea

K-pop (Korean: 케이팝; RR: Keipap; an abbreviation of "Korean popular music") is a form of popular music originating in South Korea. The music genre that the term is used to refer to colloquially emerged in the 1990s as a form of youth subculture, with Korean musicians influenced by Western dance music, hip-hop, R&B and rock. Today, K-pop commonly refers to the musical output of teen idol acts, chiefly girl groups and boy bands, who emphasize visual appeal and performance. As a pop genre, K-pop is characterized by its melodic quality and cultural hybridity.

K-pop can trace its origins to "rap dance", a fusion of hip-hop, techno and rock popularized by the group Seo Taiji and Boys, whose experimentation helped to modernize South Korea's contemporary music scene in the early 1990s. Their popularity with teenagers led the music industry to focus on this demographic. Lee Soo-man of SM Entertainment, who developed the Korean idol system in the late 1990s, created H.O.T. and S.E.S., the "first generation" of K-pop. By the early 2000s, TVXQ and BoA had achieved success in Japan and gained traction for the genre overseas.

In the 2010s, the Korean Wave and social media drove the international popularity of K-pop. In 2019, South Korea ranked sixth among music markets, led by artists BTS and Blackpink. The following year, South Korea's music market a record 44.8%, making it the year's fastest-growing major market.

Despite heavy influence from American pop music, some have argued that K-pop is distinct in mood and energy. The "Koreanness" of K-pop has been debated in recent years, with an increasing share of Western songwriters, non-Korean artists, songs in English and marketing for a global audience. Some authors have called K-pop a new kind of "transnational culture" with "global dissemination".

K-pop is known for its tight managerial control. It has been criticized for its commercialism and treatment of artists. The industry is dominated by four companies: SM, YG, JYP and Hybe. In the 2020s, the genre has seen greater artist autonomy and companies producing music overseas; groups like JO1 and Katseye have resulted from this globalization.

== Etymology ==
The term "K-pop" is the South Korean equivalent of the Japanese "J-pop." The first known use of the term occurred in Billboard in the October 9, 1999 edition at the end of an article titled "S. Korea To Allow Some Japanese Live Acts" by Cho Hyun-jin, then a South Korea correspondent for the magazine, which used it as a broad term for South Korean pop music. Cho himself, however, is not sure if he coined the term, since some articles stated that the word 'K-pop' was already being used by music industry insiders, even though he had never heard it personally.

The term K-pop became popular in the 2000s, especially in an international context. In South Korea, domestic pop music is referred to as gayo (가요), which is still widely used within the country. In 2022, the Korean Music Awards established a separate genre-specific field for K-pop, defining its "distinct aesthetic tendencies" as dance-pop music originating from the Korean idol system with a focus on performance.

In academic circles, the term has been retroactively applied to the popular music of Korea going back as far as the 1930s.

== Characteristics ==
=== Audiovisual content ===
The French Institut national de l'audiovisuel defines K-pop as a "fusion of synthesized music, sharp dance routines and fashionable, colorful outfits." Songs typically consist of one or a mixture of pop, rock, hip-hop, R&B, and electronic music genres.

=== Idol trainee ===
The mainstream method is to become an idol trainee through agency auditions, online auditions, or street casting.

South Korean management agencies offer binding contracts to potential artists, sometimes at a young age. Trainees live together in a regulated environment and spend many hours a day learning how to sing, dance, speak foreign languages, and gain other skills in preparation for their debut. This "robotic" system of training is often criticized by Western media outlets. In 2012, The Wall Street Journal reported that the cost of training one Korean idol under SM Entertainment averaged US$3 million.

=== Hybrid genre and transnational values ===
Search volume for K-pop for the period 2008–2012 according to Google Trends.

K-pop is a cultural product that features "values, identity and meanings that go beyond their strictly commercial value." It is characterized by a mixture of modern Western sounds and African-American influences (including sounds from Hip-hop, R&B, Jazz, black pop, soul, funk, techno, disco, house, and Afrobeats) with a Korean aspect of performance (including synchronized dance moves, formation changes and the so-called "point choreography" consisting of hooking and repetitive key movements). It has been remarked that there is a "vision of modernization" inherent in Korean pop culture. For some, the transnational values of K-pop are responsible for its success. A commentator at the University of California, San Diego has said that "contemporary Korean pop culture is built on ... transnational flows ... taking place across, beyond, and outside national and institutional boundaries." Some examples of the transnational values inherent in K-pop that may appeal to those from different ethnic, national, and religious backgrounds include a dedication to high-quality output and presentation of idols, as well as their work ethic and polite social demeanor, made possible by the training period. Many K-pop idols are not ethnically Korean or Asian.

==== Use of English phrases ====
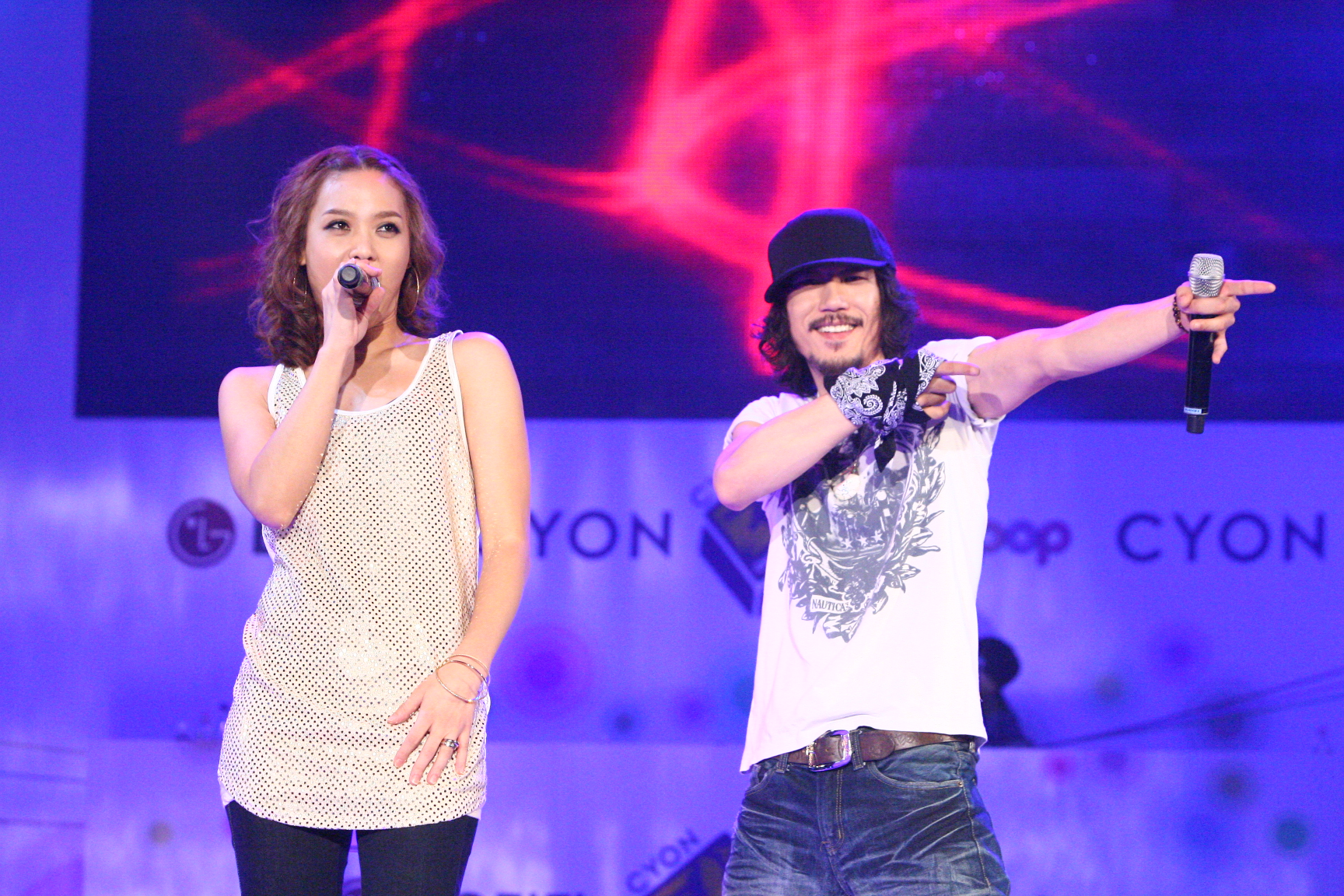
Hip-hop artist Yoon Mi-rae and her husband, rapper Tiger JK of Drunken Tiger, are credited with popularizing American-style hip hop in Korea.

Modern K-pop is marked by its use of English phrases. Jin Dal Yong of Popular Music and Society wrote that the usage may be influenced by "Korean-Americans and/or Koreans who studied in the U.S. [who] take full advantage of their English fluency and cultural resources that are not found commonly among those who were raised and educated in Korea." Korean pop music from singers or groups who are Korean-American such as Fly to the Sky, g.o.d, Rich, Yoo Seung-jun, and Drunken Tiger has both American style and English lyrics. This type of music has a different style from common Korean music, which attracts the interest of young people. Increasingly, foreign songwriters and producers are employed to work on songs for K-pop idols, such as will.i.am and Sean Garrett. Foreign musicians, including rappers like Akon, Kanye West, Ludacris, and Snoop Dogg, have also featured on K-pop songs.

Entertainment companies help to expand K-pop to other parts of the world through a number of different methods. Singers need to use English since the companies want to occupy markets in the other parts of Asia, which enables them to open the Western market. Most K-pop singers learn English because it is a common language in the world of music, but some singers also learn other foreign languages such as Japanese to approach the Japanese market. Similarly, K-pop bands increasingly use English names rather than Korean ones. This allows songs and artists to be marketed to a wider audience around the world.

However, the use of English has not guaranteed the popularity of K-pop in the North American market. For some commentators, the reason for this is because the genre can be seen as a distilled version of Western music, making it difficult for K-pop to find acceptance in these markets. Furthermore, Western audiences tend to place emphasis on authenticity and individual expression in music, which the idol system can be seen as suppressing. According to Elaine W. Chun's research, even though hybridity appears more and more often in K-pop, and sometimes may even make fans admire K-pop stars more because it is fresh, new and interesting, ideals of linguistic purity are still difficult to alter.

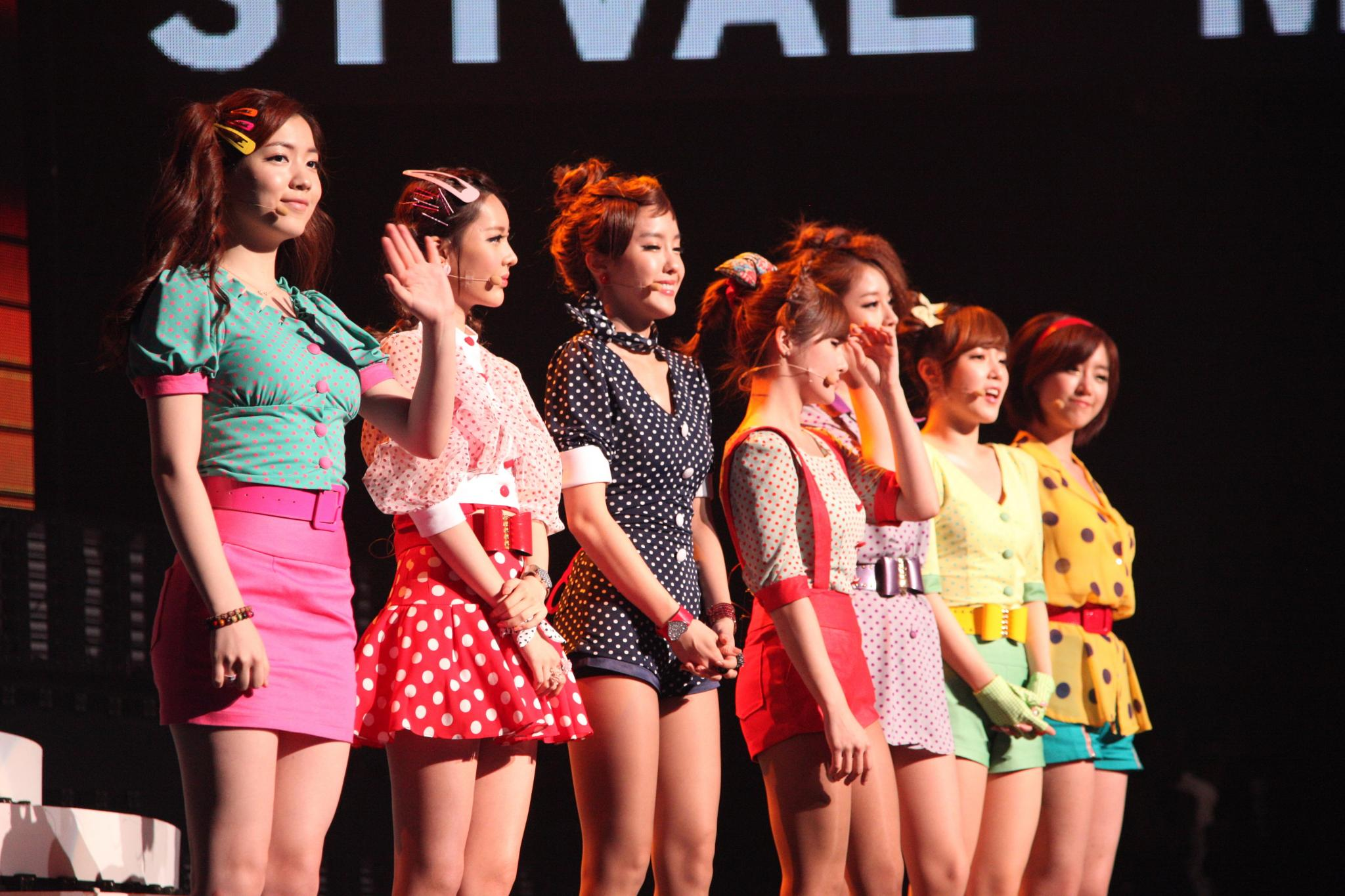
T-ara at the "Cyworld Dream Music Festival", 2011

Artist names, song titles, and lyrics have exhibited significant growth in the usage of English words. No singers in the top fifty charts in 1990 had English in their names: people who worked in the Korean music industry viewed using Korean names as standard. In 1995, most popular singers such as Kim Gun-mo, Park Mi-kyung, Park Jin-young, Lee Seung-chul, and Byun Jin-sub still used Korean names, but fourteen of the singers and groups in the top fifty used English names, including DJ DOC, 015B, Piano, and Solid. After the 1997 financial crisis, the government stopped censoring English lyrics and Korea started to have a boom in English. Since the late 1990s, English usage in singers' names, song titles, and lyrics has grown quickly. Seventeen singers in the top fifty charts used English names in 2000, and thirty-one did so in 2005. In 2010, forty-one singers used English names among the top fifty songs, but usually, three or four singers and groups had more than one or two songs on the chart simultaneously. Korean names (e.g. Baek Ji-young, Seo In-young, and Huh Gak) are seen less frequently, and many K-pop singers have English names (e.g. IU, Sistar, T-ara, GD & TOP, Beast, and After School). Notably, until the early 1990s, musicians with English names would transliterate them into hangul, but now singers would use English names written with the Roman alphabet. In 1995, the percentage of song titles using English in the top 50 charts was 8%. This fluctuated between 30% in 2000, 18% in 2005, and 44% in 2010. An example of a Korean song with a large proportion of English lyrics is Kara's "Jumping," which was released at the same time in both Korea and Japan to much success.

=== Marketing ===
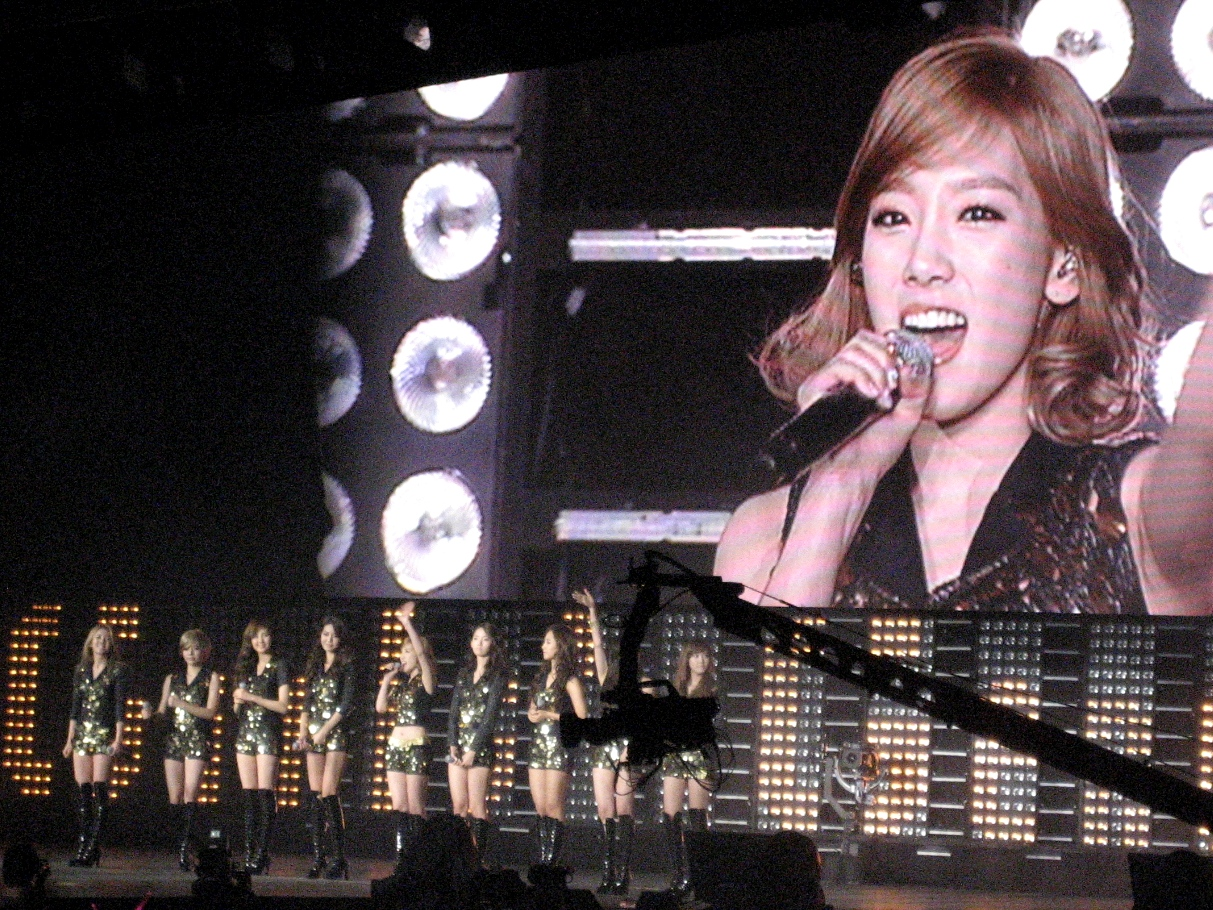
Girls' Generation (SNSD) at SM Town Live NY in 2011, reflecting the rise of hallyu

Many agencies have presented new idol groups to an audience through a "debut showcase" which consists of online marketing and television broadcast promotions as opposed to radio. Groups are given a name and a "concept" along with a marketing hook. These concepts are the type of visual and musical theme that idol groups utilize during their debut or comeback. Concepts can change between debuts and fans often distinguish between boy group concepts and girl group concepts. Concepts can also be divided between general concepts and theme concepts, such as cute or fantasy. New idol groups will often debut with a concept well known to the market to secure a successful debut. Sometimes sub-units or sub-groups are formed among existing members. Two example subgroups are Super Junior-K.R.Y., which consists of Super Junior members Kyuhyun, Ryeowook, and Yesung, and Super Junior-M, which became one of the best-selling K-pop subgroups in China.

Online marketing includes music videos posted to YouTube in order to reach a worldwide audience. Prior to the actual video, the group releases teaser photos and trailers. Promotional cycles of subsequent singles are called comebacks even when the musician or group in question did not go on hiatus.

=== Dance ===
The dance for "Gangsta", an electronic dance track by Noir, includes point choreography.

Dance is an integral part of K-pop. When combining multiple singers, the singers often switch their positions while singing and dancing by making prompt movements in synchrony, a strategy called "formation changing" (자리바꿈; jaribakkum). The K-pop choreography (안무; 按舞; anmu) often includes the so-called "point dance" (포인트 안무; pointeu anmu), referring to a dance made up of hooking and repetitive movements within the choreography that matches the characteristics of the lyrics of the song. Super Junior's "Sorry Sorry" and Brown Eyed Girls' "Abracadabra" are examples of songs with notable "point" choreography. To choreograph a dance for a song requires the writers to take the tempo into account. According to Ellen Kim, a Los Angeles dancer and choreographer, a fan's ability to do the same steps must also be considered. Consequently, K-pop choreographers have to simplify movements.

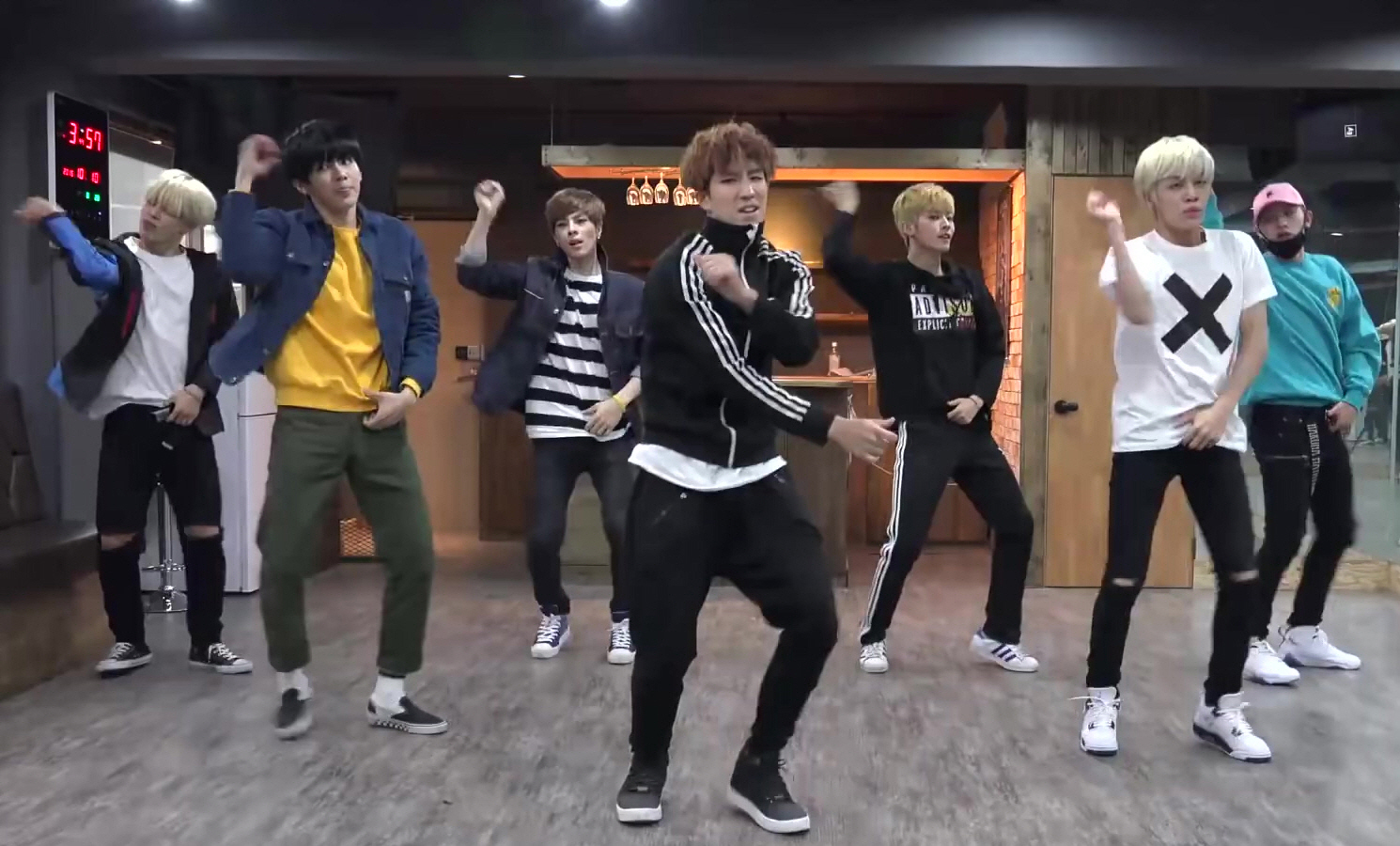
24K performing choreography in a practice studio

The training and preparation necessary for K-pop idols to succeed in the industry and dance successfully are intense. Training centers like Seoul's Def Dance Skool develop the dance skills of youth in order to give them a shot at becoming an idol. Physical training is one of the largest focuses at the school, as much of a student's schedule is based around dance and exercise. The entertainment labels are highly selective, so few make it to fame. Students at the school must dedicate their lives to the mastery of dance in order to prepare for the vigorous routines performed by K-pop groups. This, of course, means that the training must continue if they are signed. Companies house much larger training centers for those who are chosen.

An interview with K-pop choreographer Rino Nakasone lends insight into the process of creating routines. According to Nakasone, her focus is to make dance routines that are flattering for the dancers but also complementary to the music. Her ideas are submitted to the entertainment company as video recordings done by professional dancers. Nakasone mentions that the company and the K-pop artists themselves have input on a song's choreography. Choreographer May J. Lee gives another perspective, telling that her choreography often starts out as expressing the feeling or the meaning of the lyrics. What starts out as small movements turns into a full dance that is better able to portray the message of the song.

=== Fashion ===
The emergence of Seo Taiji and Boys in 1992 paved the way for the development of contemporary K-pop groups. The group revolutionized the Korean music scene by incorporating rap and American hip-hop conventions into their music. This adoption of Western style extended to the fashions worn by the boy band: the members adopted a hip-hop aesthetic. Seo and bandmates' outfits for the promotional cycle of "I Know" included vibrant streetwear such as oversized T-shirts and sweatshirts, windbreakers, overalls worn with one strap, overalls worn with one pant leg rolled up, and American sports team jerseys. Accessories included baseball caps worn backwards, bucket hats, and do-rags.

As K-pop "was born of post-Seo trends," many acts that followed Seo Taiji and Boys adopted the same fashion style. Deux and DJ DOC can also be seen wearing on-trend hip-hop fashions such as sagging baggy pants, sportswear, and bandanas in their performances. With Korean popular music transforming into youth-dominated media, manufactured teenage idol groups began debuting in the mid and late 1990s, wearing coordinated costumes that reflected the popular fashion trends among youth at the time. Hip-hop fashion, considered the most popular style in the late '90s, remained, with idol groups H.O.T. and Sechs Kies wearing the style for their debut songs. The use of accessories elevated the idol's style from everyday fashion to performance costume, like ski goggles (worn either around the head or neck), headphones worn around the neck, and oversized gloves worn to accentuate choreography moves were widely used. H.O.T.'s 1996 hit "Candy" exemplifies the level of coordination taken into account for idol's costumes, as each member wore a designated color and accessorized with face paint, fuzzy oversized mittens, visors, bucket hats, and earmuffs, and used stuffed animals, backpacks, and messenger bags as props.

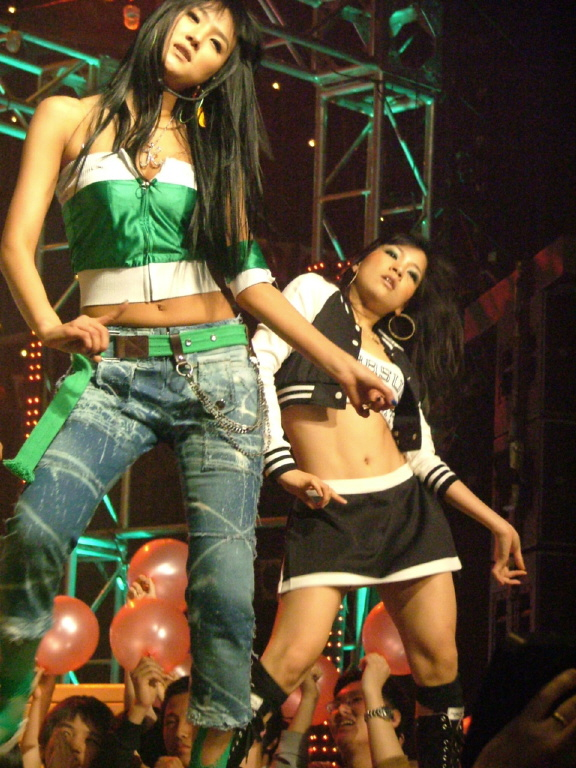
Members of Baby Vox performing in 2004

While male idol groups' costumes were constructed with similar color schemes, fabrics, and styles, the outfits worn by each member still maintained individuality. On the other hand, female idol groups of the '90s wore homogeneous costumes, often styled identically. The costumes for female idols during their early promotions often focused on portraying an innocent, youthful image. S.E.S.'s debut in 1997, "('Cause) I'm Your Girl", and Baby Vox's second album 1998 hit, "Ya Ya Ya," featured the girls dressed in white outfits, "To My Boyfriend" by Fin.K.L shows idols in pink schoolgirl costumes, and "One" and "End" of Chakra presented Hindu and African style costumes. To portray a natural and somewhat saccharine image, the accessories were limited to large bows, pompom hair ornaments and hair bands. With the maturation of female idol groups and the removal of bubblegum pop in the late 1990s, the sets of female idol groups focused on following the fashion trends of the time, many of which were revealing pieces. The latest promotions of the girl groups Baby Vox and Jewelry exemplify these trends of hot pants, micro-miniskirts, crop tops, peasant blouses, transparent garments and blouses on the upper part of the torso.

As K-pop became a modern hybrid of Western and Asian cultures starting from the late 2000s, fashion trends within K-pop reflected diversity and distinction as well. Fashion trends from the late 2000s to early 2010s can largely be categorized under the following:

- Street: focuses on individuality; features bright colors, mix-and-match styling, graphic prints, and sports brands such as Adidas and Reebok.
- Retro: aims to bring back "nostalgia" from the 1960s to 1980s; features dot prints and detailed patterns. Common clothing items include denim jackets, boot-cut pants, wide pants, hair bands, scarves, and sunglasses.
- Sexy: highlights femininity and masculinity; features revealing outfits made of satin, lace, fur, and leather. Common clothing items include mini skirts, corsets, net stockings, high heels, sleeveless vests, and see-through shirts.
- Black & White: emphasizes modern and chic, symbolizes elegance and charisma, mostly applied to formal wear.
- Futurism: commonly worn with electronic and hip-hop genres; features popping color items, metallic details and prints; promotes a futuristic outlook.

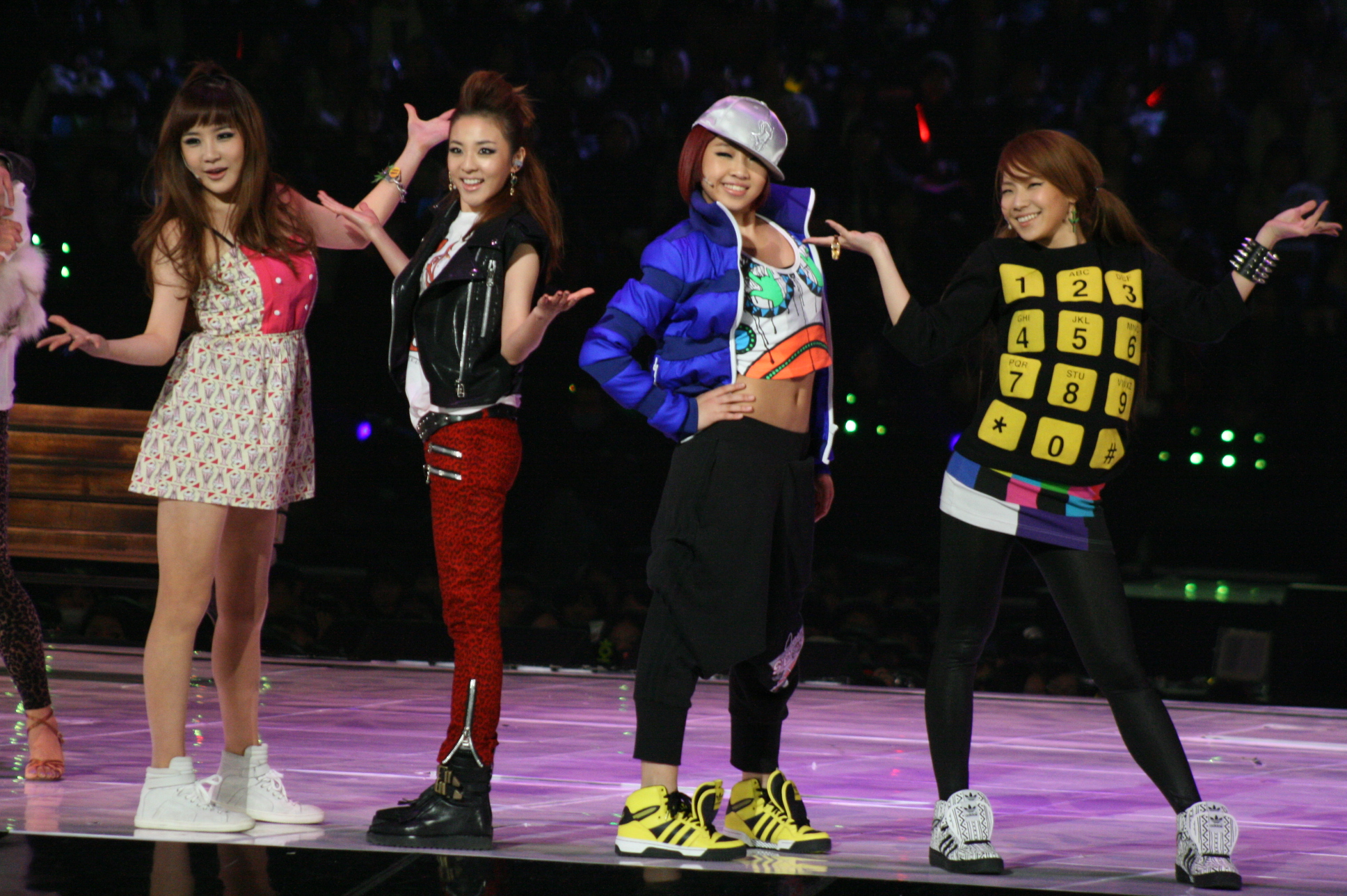
2NE1 performing "I Don't Care"—an instance of street style

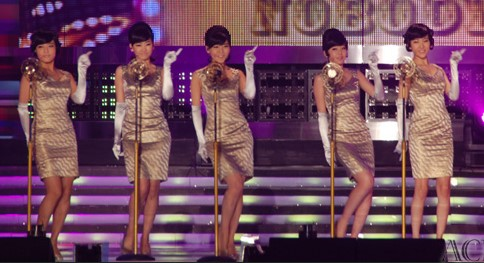
Wonder Girls performing "Nobody"—an instance of retro style

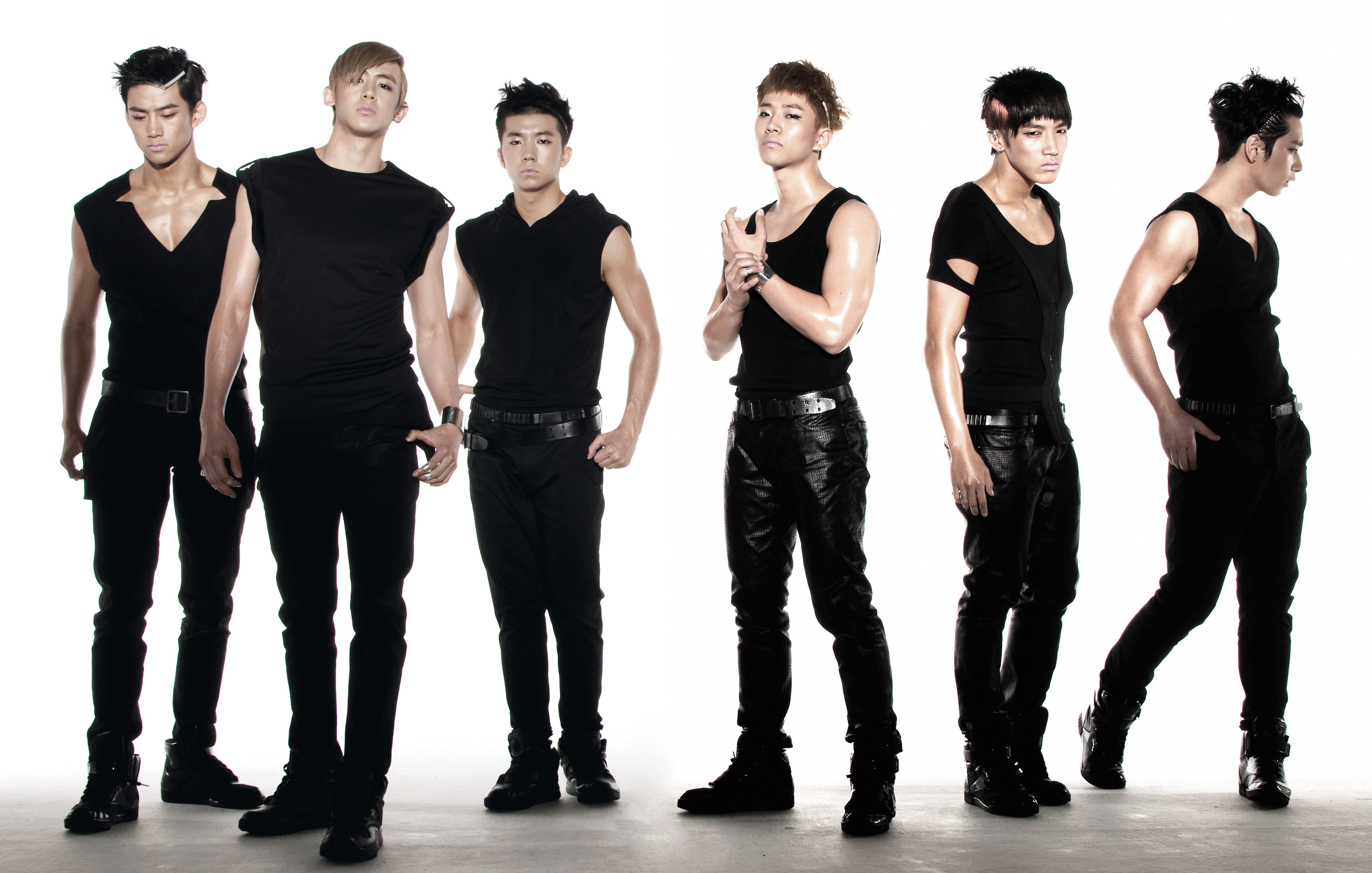
A publicity shot of 2PM—an instance of sexy style

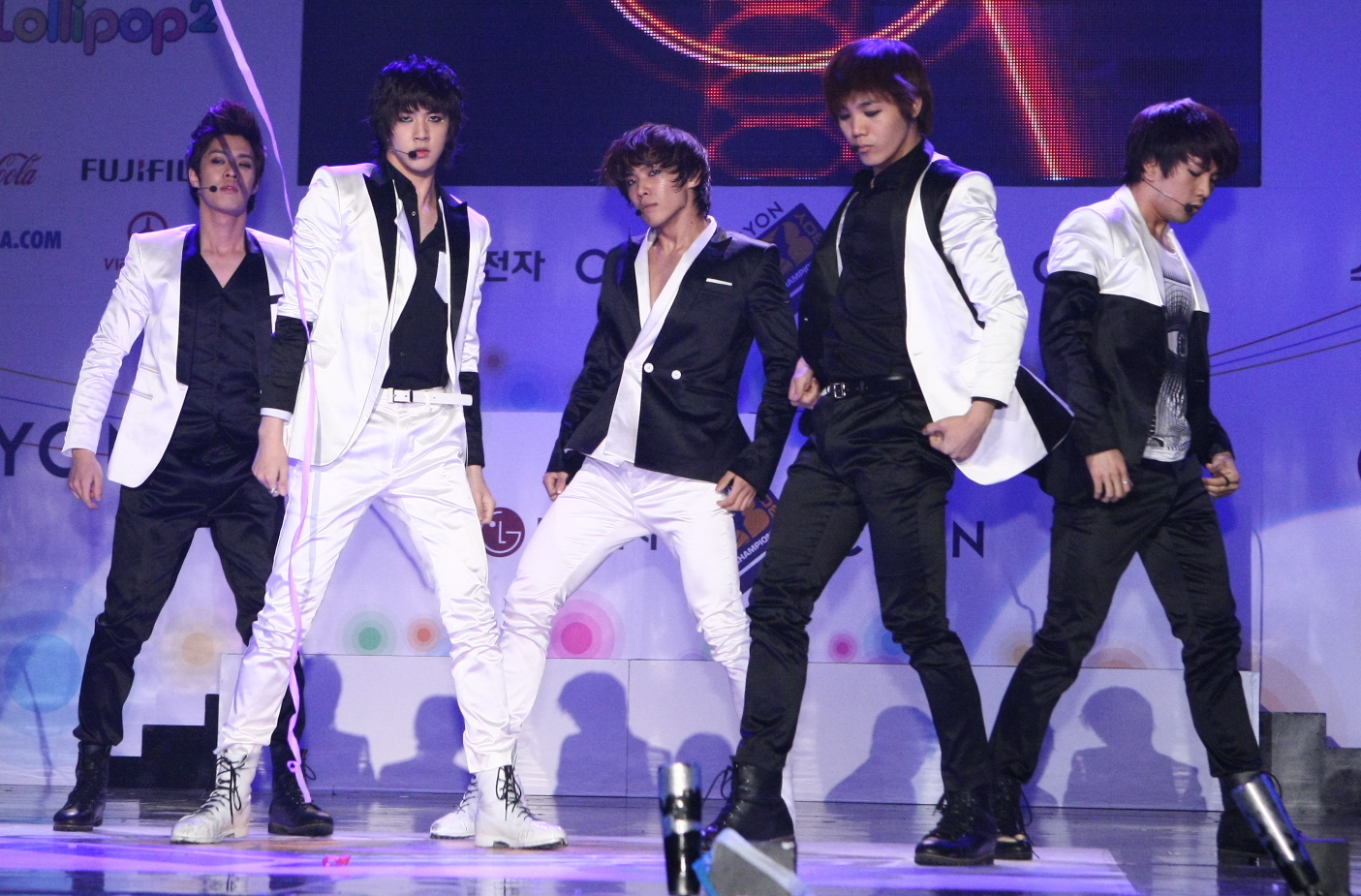
MBLAQ performing "Y"—an instance of black & white style

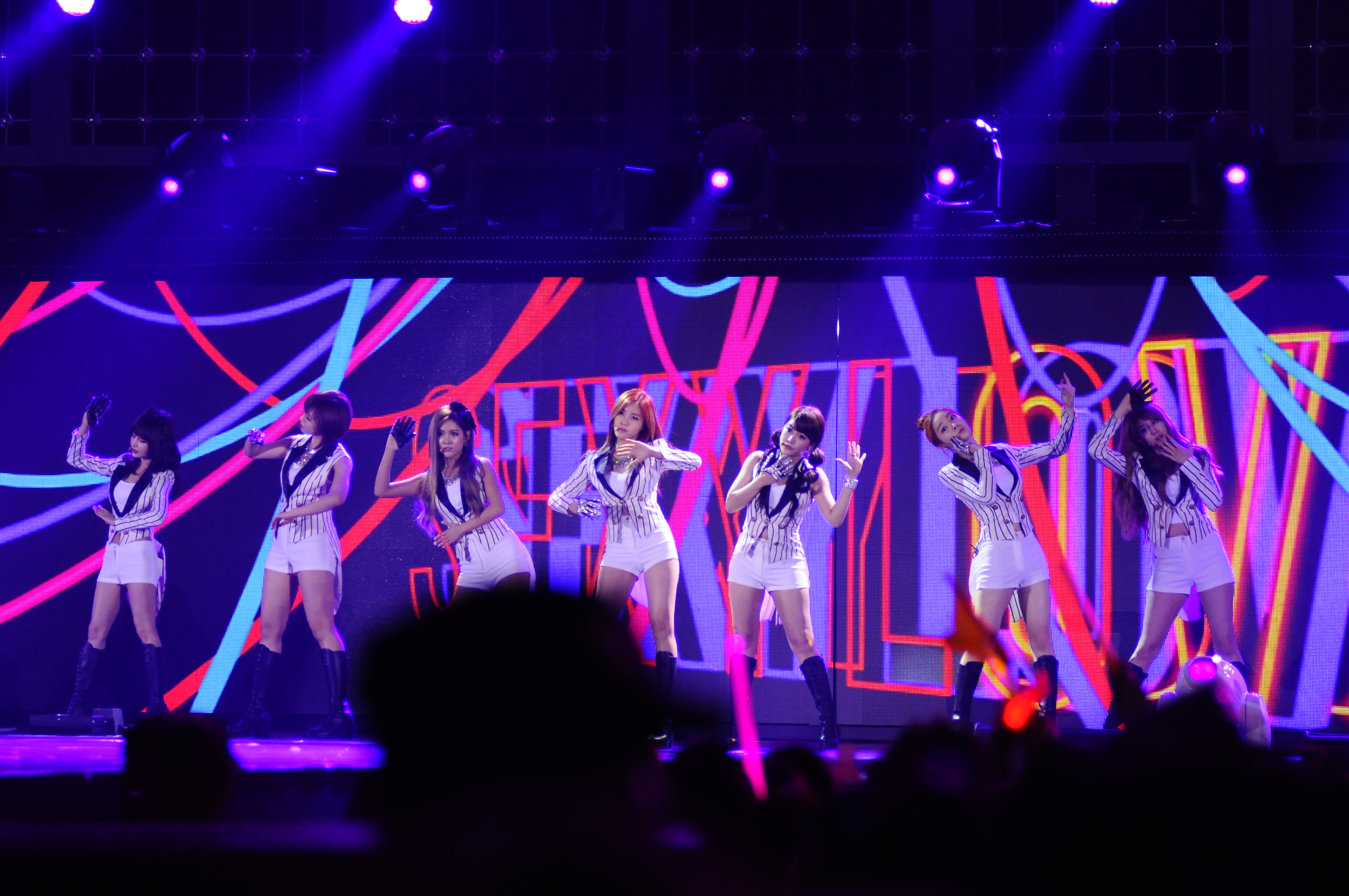
T-ara performing "Sexy Love"—an instance of futurism style

K-pop has a significant influence on fashion in Asia, where trends started by idols are followed by young audiences. Some idols have established status as fashion icons, such as G-Dragon and CL, who has repeatedly worked with fashion designer Jeremy Scott, being labeled his "muse."

According to professor Ingyu Oh, "K-pop emphasizes thin, tall, and feminine looks with adolescent or sometimes very cute facial expressions, regardless of whether they're male or female singers."

=== Government support ===
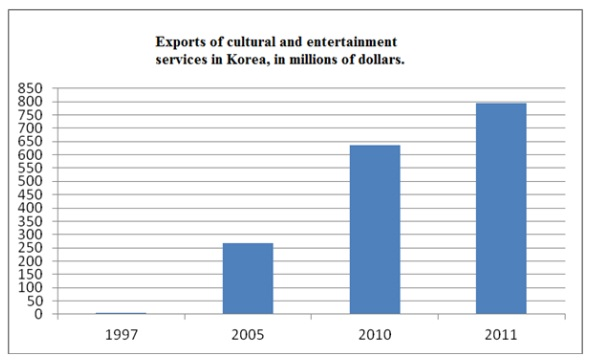
The Bank of Korea has attributed the rapid surge in cultural exports since 1997 to the increased worldwide popularity of K-pop.

The South Korean government has acknowledged benefits to the country's export sector as a result of the Korean Wave (it was estimated in 2011 that a US$100 increase in the export of cultural products resulted in a US$412 increase in exports of other consumer goods including food, clothes, cosmetics and IT products) and thus have subsidized certain endeavours. Government initiatives to expand the popularity of K-pop are mostly undertaken by the Ministry of Culture, Sports and Tourism, which is responsible for the worldwide establishment of Korean Cultural Centers. South Korean embassies and consulates have also organized K-pop concerts outside the country, and the Ministry of Foreign Affairs regularly invites overseas K-pop fans to attend the annual K-Pop World Festival in South Korea.

In addition to reaping economic benefits from the popularity of K-pop, the South Korean government has been taking advantage of the influence of K-pop in diplomacy. In an age of mass communication, soft power (pursuing one's goals by persuading stakeholders using cultural and ideological power) is regarded as a more effective and pragmatic diplomatic tactic than the traditional diplomatic strategy hard power (obtaining what one wants from stakeholders through direct intimidation such as military threat and economic sanctions). Cultural diplomacy through K-pop is a form of soft power.

An example of the South Korean government effort in diplomacy through K-pop is the Mnet Asian Music Awards (MAMA), a K-pop music award ceremony. Park Geun-hye (the Korean president at the time) delivered the opening statement at the 2014 MAMA, which was held in Hong Kong and sponsored by the Korean Small and Medium Business Administration (SMBA). This event was considered a deliberate endeavor by the Korean government to support Korean cultural industries in order to strengthen the nation's international reputation and political influence.

Another example of cultural diplomacy is K-pop performances in North Korea. Prior to 2005, South Korean pop singers occasionally gave performances in North Korea. After an interval of more than a decade, approximately 190 South Korean performers, including well-known musicians Red Velvet, Lee Sun-hee, Cho Yong-pil, and Yoon Do-hyun, performed in Pyongyang, North Korea, on March 31 and April 3, 2018. Kim Jong Un was present in the audience.

== History ==
=== Origins of Korean popular music ===
Oppaneun punggakjaengi
(오빠는 풍각쟁이; lit. Older brother is a street musician)
A 1938 trot song by Kim Song-gyu and Park Yeong-ho. Sung by Park Hyang-rim.

The history of Korean popular music can be traced back to 1885 when an American missionary, Henry Appenzeller, began teaching American and British folk songs at a school. These songs were called changga (창가; 唱歌), and they were typically based on a popular Western melody sung with Korean lyrics. For example, the song "Oh My Darling, Clementine" became known as Simcheongga (심청가; 沈淸歌). (Note: Not to be confused with the pansori story of the same name.) During the Japanese colonial period (1910–1945), the popularity of changga songs rose as Koreans expressed their feelings against Japanese oppression through music. One of the most popular songs was Huimangga (희망가; 希望歌). The Japanese confiscated the existing changga collections and published lyrics books of their own.

K-pop was represented by H.O.T in the early days, and it was mostly fanatical, flashy, and showed the rebellious psychology of young people in the emotional aspects. Most of the songs are relatively fast-paced and have a strong sense of rhythm, which is suitable for dancing. They often sing and dance when they perform, and the choreography urbanance is a very important factor in popularity. The first known Korean pop album was I Pungjin Sewol (이 풍진 세월; 이 風塵 歲月; lit. 'This Tumultuous Time'), by Park Chae-seon and Lee Ryu-saek in 1925, which contained popular songs translated from Japanese. The first pop song written by a Korean composer is thought to be Nakhwayusu (낙화유수; 落花流水; lit. 'Fallen Blossoms on Running Water') sung by Lee Jeong-suk in 1929. In the mid-1920s, Japanese composer Masao Koga mixed traditional Korean music with Gospel music that American Evangelists introduced in the 1870s. This type of music became known as Enka in Japan, and later in Korea developed into Trot (트로트; teuroteu; t'ŭrot'ŭ). In the 1930s singers such as Wang Su-bok, Lee Eun-pa and the Jeogori Sisters popularised folk music further.

=== 1940s–1960s: Arrival of Western culture ===
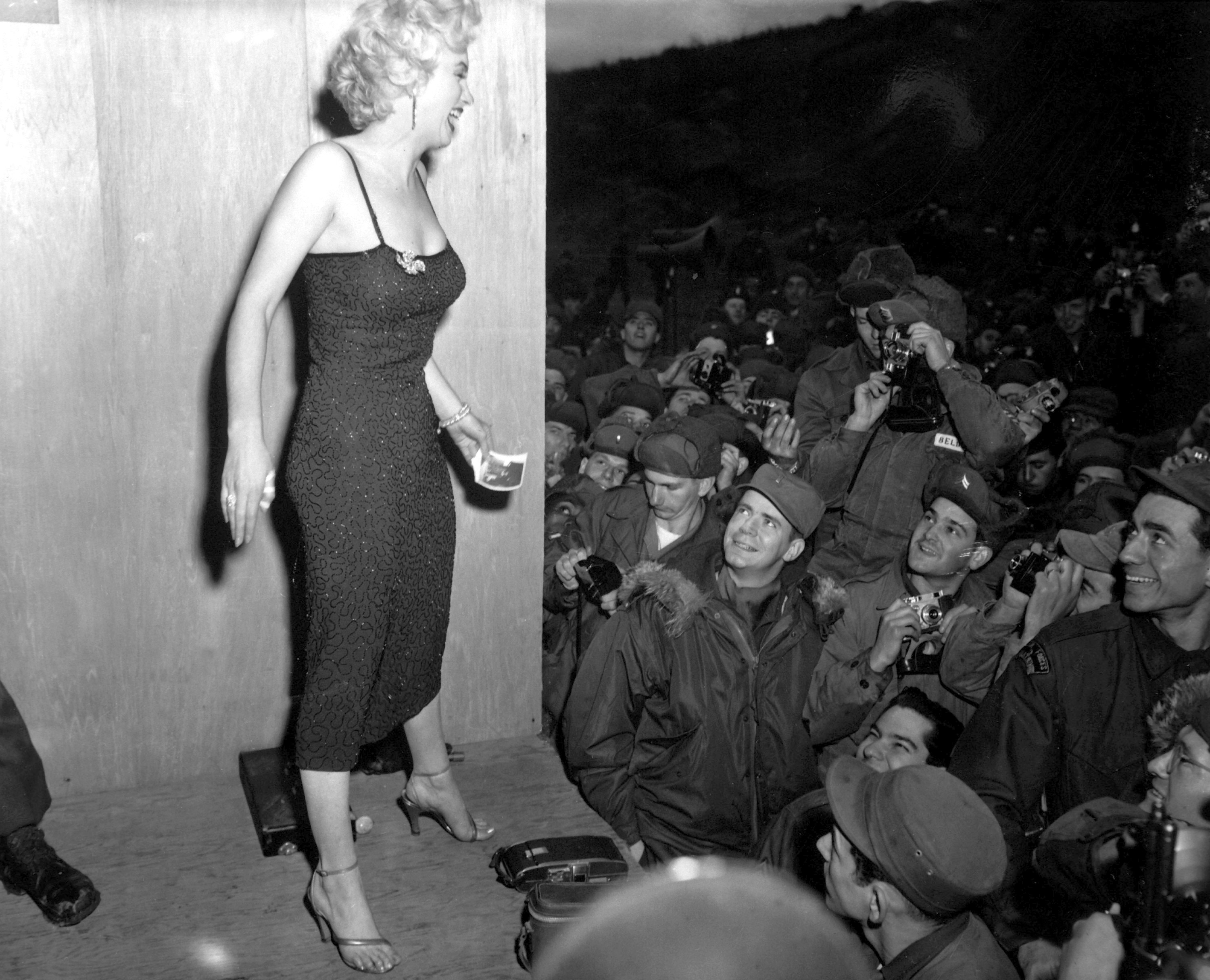
Marilyn Monroe entertaining American soldiers in Korea in 1954

After the Korean Peninsula was partitioned into North and South following its liberation in 1945 from Japanese occupation, Western culture was introduced into South Korea on a small scale, with a few Western-styled bars and clubs playing Western music. After the Korean War (1950–1953) U.S. troops remained in South Korea, causing American and world culture to spread in South Korea and Western music to gradually become more accepted. Prominent figures of American entertainment like Nat King Cole, Marilyn Monroe and Louis Armstrong held USO shows in South Korea for the U.S. Army. These visits prompted attention from the Korean public. In 1957, the American Forces Korea Network radio started its broadcast, spreading the popularity of Western music. American music started influencing Korean music, as pentatony was gradually replaced by heptachords and popular songs started to be modeled after American ones.

In the 1960s, the development of LP records and improvements in recording technology led to the pursuit of diverse voice tones. Open auditions were also held to recruit musicians to perform at the U.S. army clubs. Since South Korea was impoverished after the Korean War, skilled Korean singers regarded performing for the U.S. troops as a good means to earn money. Many singers sang for the American troops, usually in dedicated clubs, the number of which rose to 264. They performed various genres like country music, blues, jazz and rock & roll. The South Korean economy started blooming and popular music followed the trend, spread by the first commercial radio stations. Korean cinema also began to develop and Korean musicians began performing to wider audiences.

When Beatlemania reached the shores of Korea the first local rock bands appeared, the first of which is said to be Add4, a band founded in 1962. The first talent contest for rock bands in Seoul was organized in 1968.

Some Korean singers gained international popularity. In 1959, the Kim Sisters went to Las Vegas and became the first Korean artist to release an album in the U.S. pop market. Their cover of "Charlie Brown" reached No.7 on the Billboard Single Chart. The Kim Sisters also appeared on TV programs and radio programs and held tours in the U.S. and Europe. They made 25 appearances on The Ed Sullivan Show—more than American stars like Patti Page and Louis Armstrong (who appeared 18 times each). The Kim Sisters, Yoon Bok-hee and Patti Kim were the first singers to debut in such countries as Vietnam and the United States. The Kim Sisters became the first Korean group to release an album in the United States. They also performed in Las Vegas. Han Myeong-suk's 1961 song "The Boy in The Yellow Shirt" was covered by French singer Yvette Giraud and was also popular in Japan.

In the 1960s, the Korean artists such as Shin Joong-hyun, Pearl Sisters and Patti Kim who previously performed for the U.S. army clubs reached out to the Korean public. In the mid-1960s, due to the influence of the legendary British group The Beatles, there was a rise of "group sound" in South Korea, for example, Add4 and the Key Boys. Add4, Korea's first rock group, was formed by Shin Joong-hyun in 1962 and produced Korea's first rock song, "The Woman in the Rain," which is a form of light rock reminiscent of the early Beatles. Shin Joong-hyun was so instrumental in the development of Korean rock music that he is regarded as the "godfather of Korean rock" in South Korea.

During this period, with the rise of Western pop music and Korean rock music, trot was no longer predominant in South Korea. However, trot singers like Lee Mi-ja still managed to attract a certain level of popularity, with famous songs like "Camellia Lady" (동백 아가씨; 冬柏 아가씨; dongbaek agassi).

During the 1950s and 60s, Western pop music, Korean rock music, and trot co-existed in South Korea.

=== Late 1960s and 1970s: Hippie and folk influences ===
At the end of the 1960s Korean pop music underwent another transformation. More and more musicians were university students and graduates who were heavily influenced by American culture and lifestyle (including the hippie movement of the 1960s) and made lighthearted music unlike their predecessors, who were influenced by war and Japanese oppression. The younger generation opposed the Vietnam War as much as American hippies did, which resulted in the Korean government banning songs with more liberal lyrics. In spite of this, folk-influenced pop remained popular among the youth, and local television channel MBC organized a music contest for university students in 1977. This was the foundation of several modern music festivals. The younger generation born after the 1950s had grown up under the U.S. influence and preferred the U.S. lifestyle, giving rise to the "youth culture" which was expressed through long hair, jeans, acoustic guitars and folk music. The folk music of that time is made up of melodies sung plainly, with the singing accompanied by a guitar or two. A majority of the folk music at that time was initiated by elite university students and those who graduated from prestigious schools. Like the activists of the U.S. student movement, they turned to folk music as the preferred music of politicized youth, who staged demonstrations against the authoritarian government. In turn, the government banned folk music due to its association with the students' anti-government movements. In the 1970s, the Park Chung Hee government banned American pop music and Korean rock music for their association with sex and drugs. Shin Joong-hyun, the "godfather of Korean rock music," was imprisoned in 1975 due to a marijuana scandal. In order to bolster its anti-Japanese credentials, the government also banned trot songs because of its "Japanese style" (왜색; 倭色; waesaek) given the influence of Japanese enka songs on trot. However, President Park actually embraced trot.

One of the leading figures of the era was Hahn Dae-soo, who was raised in the United States and influenced by Bob Dylan, Leonard Cohen and John Lennon. Han's song Mul jom juso (Korean: 물 좀 주소; lit. 'Give me water') became iconic among young people in Korea. His daring performances and unique singing style often shocked the public and later he was banned from performing in Korea. Han moved to New York City and pursued his musical career there, only returning to his home country in the 1990s. Other notable singers of the period include Song Chang-sik, Jo Young-nam, and Yang Hee-eun.

In the 1970s, DJs also started to become popular.

=== 1980s: The era of ballads ===
The 1980s saw the rise of ballad singers after Lee Gwang-jo's 1985 album "You're Too Far Away to Get Close to" (가까이 하기엔 너무 먼 당신) sold more than 300,000 copies. Other popular ballad singers included Lee Moon-se (이문세) and Byun Jin-sub (변진섭), nicknamed the "Prince of Ballads". One of the most sought-after ballad composers of the era was Lee Young-hoon (이영훈), whose songs were compiled into a modern musical in 2011 titled Gwanghwamun Yeonga (광화문 연가; lit. 'Gwanghwamun sonata').

The Asia Music Forum was launched in 1980, with representatives from five different Asian countries competing in the event. Korean singer Cho Yong-pil won first place and went on to have a successful career, performing in Hong Kong and Japan. His first album Chang bakkui yeoja (창 밖의 여자; lit. 'Woman Outside the Window') was a hit and he became the first Korean singer to take to the stage at Carnegie Hall in New York. Cho's musical repertoire included rock, dance, trot and folk-pop. Despite his early association with rock music as an electric guitarist in a rock band, Cho Yong-pil's initial popularity came from his trot songs which were popular in both South Korea and Japan. For example, in 1976, his trot song, "Please Return to Pusan Port" (돌아와요 부산항에) was a great hit. Despite the temporary setback due to his involvement in a marijuana incident in 1977, he managed to bounce back with the song "The Woman Outside the Window" which reached a record-breaking sales of 1 million in 1980. In 1988, he sang "Seoul Seoul Seoul" in three languages (Korean, English and Japanese) to celebrate the 1988 Seoul Olympic Games.

=== 1990s: Development of modern K-pop ===
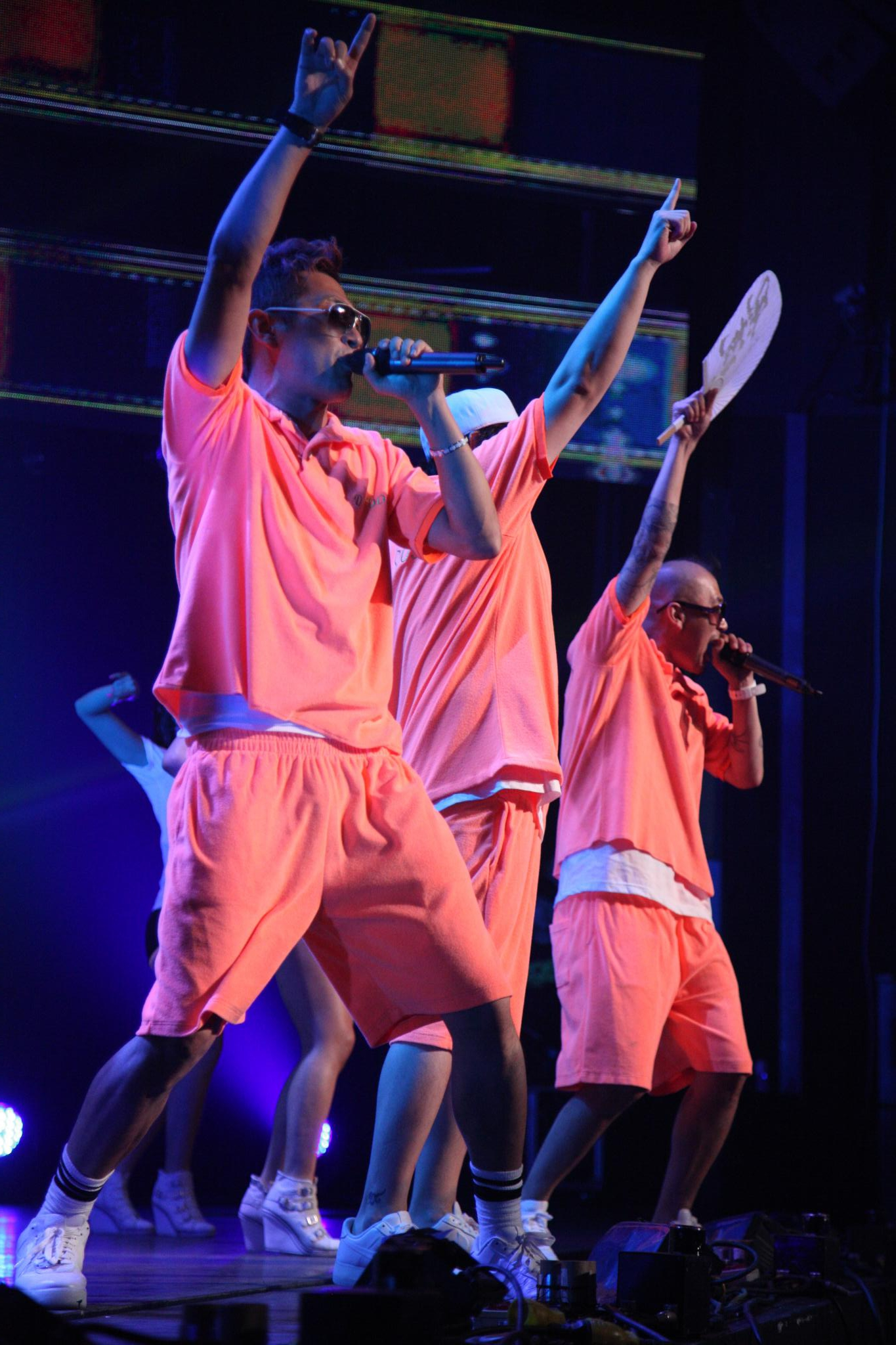
DJ DOC, one of the popular hip hop trios of the 1990s

In the 1990s, Korean pop musicians incorporated partially Europop and mostly American popular music styles such as hip-hop, rock, jazz, and electronic dance in their music. In 1992, the emergence of Seo Taiji and Boys marked a revolutionary moment in the history of K-pop. The trio debuted on MBC's talent show on April 11, 1992, with their song "I Know" and got the lowest rating from the jury; however, the song and their self-titled debut album became so successful that it paved the way for other songs of the same format. The song's success was attributed to its new jack swing-inspired beats and memorable chorus, as well as innovative lyrics which dealt with the problems of Korean society. A wave of successful hip-hop and R&B artists followed in their footsteps, including Yoo Seung-jun, Jinusean, Solid, Deux, 1TYM and Drunken Tiger.

In 1995, South Korean record producer Lee Soo-man, who was educated in the U.S. and was exposed to the trends in American music, founded the entertainment company SM Entertainment. Former Seo Taiji & Boys' member Yang Hyun-suk formed YG Entertainment in 1996, and Park Jin-young established JYP Entertainment in 1997.

The huge popularity of Seo Taiji & Boys among teenagers shifted the focus of the Korean music industry to teen-centred pop music. Idol bands of young boys or girls were formed to cater to a growing teenage audience. H.O.T. was one of the first idol boybands, debuting in 1996 after rigorous training encompassing not only singing and dancing skills but also etiquette, attitude, language and the ability to deal with the media. Their song "Candy" presented a softer and gentler form of pop music with upbeat and cheerful melodies accompanied by energetic dance steps – a formula adopted by many subsequent idol groups. The group was hugely successful, with many fans copying the group members' hairstyles and fashion. Merchandise affiliated with the group ranging from candy to perfume were sold as well. Their success was followed by that of young male and female idol groups like Sechs Kies, S.E.S., Fin.K.L, NRG, Baby Vox, Diva, Shinhwa and g.o.d, which also became popular among the younger generation.

During the late 1990s, talent agencies began to market K-pop stars by implementing an idol business model used in J-pop, where talents are selected and trained to appeal to a global audience through formal lessons or through residency programs. The extensive and intensive process includes physical and language training (a program sometimes called abusive), and potential talents are also selected for height, being much taller on average than their Japanese counterparts. Sociology professor Ingyu Oh has explained regarding looks, "K-pop emphasizes thin, tall, and feminine looks with adolescent or sometimes very cute facial expressions, regardless of whether they're male or female singers." Over time, Korean-American artists have become successful due to their fluency. These efforts increase the marketability of K-pop while also increasing South Korean soft power, which has become an important part of official policy.

The 1990s saw a reactionary movement against mainstream popular culture with the rise of illegal underground music clubs and punk rock bands such as Crying Nut. The 1997 Asian financial crisis not only prompted South Korean entertainers to look for new markets, with H.O.T. releasing a Mandarin-language album and Diva releasing an English-language album in Taiwan, but also prompted South Korea's leaders to focus on building the nation's cultural influence through music. The government poured millions into building infrastructure, technology, and a specific department within its Ministry of Culture for K-pop. Regulations were passed on karaoke bars, for example, to protect the interests of idols.

== Industry ==
=== Agencies ===
K-pop has spawned an entire industry encompassing music production houses, event management companies, music distributors, and other merchandise and service providers. The three biggest companies in terms of sales and revenue are SM Entertainment, YG Entertainment and JYP Entertainment, often referred to as the 'Big Three.' Recently, with the growth of HYBE, it has also come to be referred to as part of the 'Big Four.' These record labels also function as representative agencies for their artists. They are responsible for recruiting, financing, training, and marketing new artists as well as managing their musical activities and public relations. Currently, the agency with the greatest market share is S.M. Entertainment. In 2011, together with Star J Entertainment, AM Entertainment, and Key East, the Big Three companies founded the joint management company United Asia Management.

Total revenues of K-pop record labels (in USD million)
Year of establishment	Record label	2008	2012	2016	2020	2024	Source
1995	SM Entertainment	42.5	241	314	521	708	
1996	YG Entertainment	16.5	96.9	286.4	229	250	
1997	JYP Entertainment	3.1	13.5	69.5	129	450	
2021	Hybe (formerly Big Hit Music)	-	-	-	675	1,653	

=== Sales and market value ===
In 2009, DFSB Kollective became the first distributor of K-pop on iTunes. In 2012, the average cost of obtaining a K-pop song in South Korea amounted to US$0.10 for a single download, or $0.002 when streamed online. According to Billboard, the Korean music industry grossed nearly US$3.4 billion in the first half of 2012—a 27.8% increase on the previous year—and was recognized by Time magazine as "South Korea's Greatest Export." In 2017, it was estimated that the K-pop music industry had a revenue of US$5 billion.

By 2019, the International Federation of the Phonographic Industry (IFPI) listed South Korea as the 6th largest music market in the world, with BTS alone accounting for $4.65 billion, or 0.3%, of South Korea's GDP. In 2024, IFPI declared K-pop the leading global genre in unit sales, across both physical and digital formats. Seventeen of the top twenty albums on the IFPI Global Album Sales Chart that year belonged to the genre.

=== Record charts ===
Korean record charts include the Circle Digital Chart and the Billboard K-pop Hot 100. More recently, K-pop records have appeared on the Oricon Albums Chart of Japan and the Billboard Hot 100 of the United States.

The Circle Digital Chart compiles data from South Korea's various platforms, including Apple Music, Spotify, MelOn, Bugs, Vibe, Genie, Flo and Samsung Music. Some of the platforms release hourly and daily charts, which are compiled by the South Korean company iChart. There are three achievements achievable by iChart: All-Kill, Certified All-Kill, and Perfect All-Kill.

An All-Kill occurs when a song simultaneously places first on all of South Korea's major music platforms real-time charts, a Certified All-Kill occurs when a song simultaneously places first on all of South Korea's major music platforms real-time and daily charts. The highest achievement, a Perfect All-Kill occurs when a song simultaneously places first on South Korea's music platforms real-time, daily and weekly charts.

"Sajaegi" (사재기) is the Korean term for chart manipulation by way of bulk purchasing of albums or using bots to boost streams, which has potential to question to credibility of charts.

=== Trainee system ===
The method of having K-pop trainees go through a rigorous training system for an undetermined amount of time before debut was popularized by Lee Soo-man, founder of SM Entertainment, as part of a concept labelled "cultural technology." Lee Soo-man states that this allows his organization "to move in a systematic way" and that he "decided to codify the entire process of producing culture into a form of technology by creating a formula and manualizing it, while continuously recording its development process along with the knowledge and skills involved." In addition, he popularized the trainee business model from the Japanese idol industry that was founded by Johnny Kitagawa. The Verge described this as an "extreme" system of artist management. According to the CEO of Universal Music's Southeast Asian branch, the Korean idol trainee system is unique in the world.

Due to the length of the training period, which can extend for multiple years, and the significant financial investment that agencies commit towards their trainees, the industry approaches the launching of new artists with deliberate care. SM Entertainment says that their trainee program states that the trainee period can last at least a year and a maximum of six years. Trainees may enter an agency through auditions or be scouted, and once recruited are given accommodation and classes (commonly singing, dancing, rapping, and foreign languages such as Mandarin, English and Japanese) while they prepare for debut. During their trainee days, they are tested on their vocal skills like voice tone, vocalization, and rhythm that can be adapted to the current trends at a global level. Young trainees sometimes attend school at the same time. There is no age limit to become a trainee and no limit to the duration one can spend as a trainee. There is still a chance the trainee will never make it to debut in a group after the extensive educational program.

==== Trainee challenges ====
Some young trainees have dropped out of school to start training as K-pop idols, including Rosé from Blackpink. In a Vogue Australia interview, she said, "I decided to drop out of school and all my teachers and friends were like: 'What?! Why are you leaving!? Nobody knew what K-pop was, so nobody understood where I was going." Leaving Melbourne at the age of 16, Rosé trained with YG Entertainment for four years before debuting with Blackpink. This isn't uncommon—Taemin from Shinee entering the industry at 11 years old—but Rosé was one of the handful who discussed the difficulties of being a trainee openly. Dr. Sarah Keith explained that idols are such a valuable asset to an agency, having talents in singing, rapping, dancing, or songwriting, that they face restrictions like limitations on what they can say due to the agencies' significant investment.

In September 2024, Hanni from New Jeans testified to Korean lawmakers about the workplace harassment and mistreatment during her time at Hybe. In her testimony, Hanni describes being ignored by managers and sunbae (senior) idols within the company. She also expressed wishes that younger trainees who will soon debut will not have to suffer through the incidents that she had been through.

==== New era of trainee system ====
In the 2020 Netflix documentary Blackpink: Light Up the Sky, Blackpink's Jennie claimed that the trainee system is what defines K-pop. According to Hybe and Geffen Records, the comprehensive idol training program that has caught the global eye was Hybe's formation of Katseye, a multiracial, English language girl group that was modeled off of the K-pop principles. The Netflix docuseries Popstar Academy: Katseye depicted the girls' experiences in the auditions and their trainee journey to becoming an idol through the 2023 global competition reality show Dream Academy. In the 8 episode series, Mitra, the president of HXG at Hybe America, said, "A survival show is created because there is a section in the K-pop fan base that gets in early with the trainees." The goal of Hybe X Geffen's efforts was to take the "K" out of K-pop to build a talent pipeline of diverse skills and cultures as the next step in the evolution of K-pop. Nadia Hallgren, director of the docuseries, hoped that viewers can learn that "[y]ou can have all the talent in the world, you could have the best training and the fancy schools, if you have access, but can you mentally push through to get to the end?" and she describes the key takeaway is through these trainees, you can understand the lengths that one will go to reach their dream of becoming an artist. After 120,000 submissions, 20 finalist were narrowed down and viewers got to take part in voting for their favorite trainees. Through different "challenges" the trainees were able to have the opportunity to showcase their personality and talent to the public.

The fan voting system created tension and competition between the girls. Eliminations were significant turning points as contestants aspired to become a popstar by dropping out of high school to participate in this survival show. Sophia Laforteza, one of the members that debuted said, "The whole experience was just so much tension, so much uncertainty, and so much competition and pressure."

==== Trainee system origin ====
In 1959, Motown was founded by Berry Gordy Jr in Detroit, Michigan. He created many Motown artists, including Martha and the Vandellas, Smokey Robinson and the Miracles, The Temptations, The Four Tops, Diana Ross and the Supremes, Gladys Knight and the Pips, The Jackson 5, Stevie Wonder, and Marvin Gaye. Gordy would write songs, train them, produce, and work on his artists' individual sound. Motown would guide and direct the artists and groups towards success by overseeing many aspects of their careers. JYP referenced Berry Gordy's training system in order to create his own trainee system at JYP Entertainment. As a guest on YouTube episode talkshow series, Joon & Brian BYOB, JYP said, "I learned it from the US, but US stopped doing it and we kept doing it. That's what happened." He also expressed his thoughts that K-pop could work in America through his trainee system. "And now, we basically casted American talents and made them into a group with our system." (referring to the girl group, VCHA) JYP told CNBC that he is looking to move to the next stage by finding foreign talent because the industry can't "keep sending over Korean stars forever..."

==== Future of trainee systems ====
SM Entertainment launched "SM Culture Universe" and the first metaverse girl group, Aespa, (founded in 2020) in which real life members correspond to their virtual counterparts. Lee Soo-man, the founder of SM Entertainment, believes that this is the future of the industry. He believes that innovating technology will put his company one step ahead of competition. More groups like Plave by VLAST, an all virtual boy group that utilizes the metaverse and AI, have made a significant impact in the Korean music scene. K-Pop companies are also expanding their market by incorporating hints of Korean into predominantly English language songs, such as "APT." by Rosé and Bruno Mars.

=== Television ===
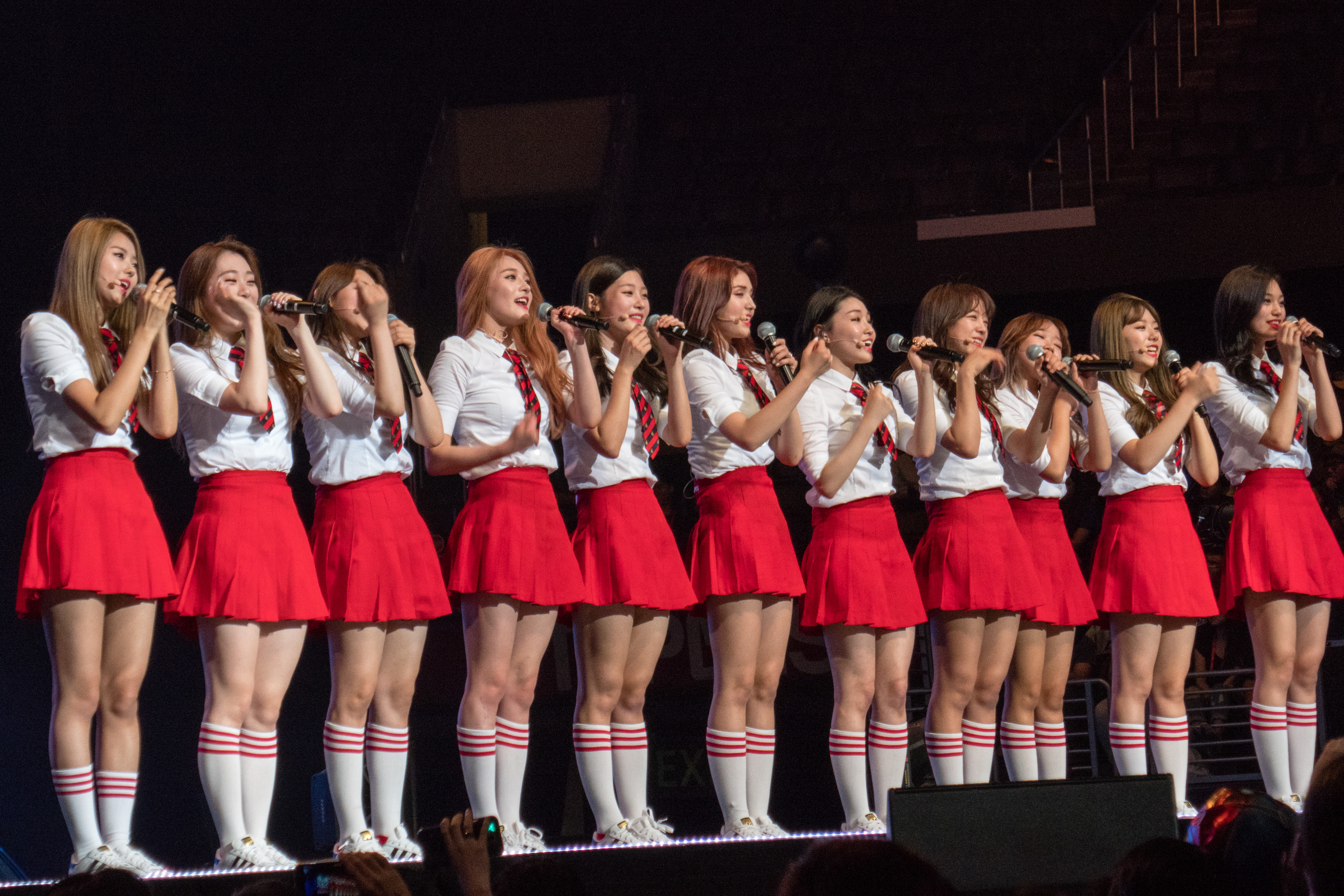
The 11-member temporary girl group I.O.I was assembled through the reality television program Produce 101.

The Korean music industry has spawned numerous related reality TV shows, including talent shows such as Superstar K and K-pop Star, specialist rap competition Show Me the Money and its female counterpart Unpretty Rapstar, and many 'survival' shows, which commonly pit trainees against each other in order to form a new idol group.

Examples of survival shows include Jellyfish Entertainment's MyDOL, which formed boy group VIXX; Sixteen, which formed girl group Twice; Starship Entertainment's No.Mercy, which formed boy group Pentagon, and Mnet's Produce 101, which formed girl groups I.O.I and Iz*One and boy groups Wanna One and X1.

The rise in these shows, which often involves larger agencies contracting smaller agencies' trainees into project groups and taking a larger portion of the revenues, has led to criticisms over the former monopolizing the industry.

=== Music shows ===
- KBS2: Music Bank
- SBS: Inkigayo
- MBC: Show! Music Core
- Mnet: M Countdown
- Arirang TV: Pops in Seoul
- Arirang TV: Simply K-Pop (formerly called The M-Wave and Wave K)
- JTBC: Music on Top
- JTBC: Music Universe K-909
- MBC M: Show Champion
- SBS M: The Show

=== Criticism of industry practices ===
==== Hybrid identity ====
There have been critical responses in South Korea regarding the identity of the genre since its ascendance. Some of the notable music critics in the region have criticized K-pop as "an industrial label mainly designed to promote the national brand in the global market from the beginning" and argued that it was "not formed spontaneously as a pop culture but created with the orchestrated plan led by the government with commercial considerations" although in fact "the genre has practically no ties with traditional Korean identity." There is the perspective that the name of the genre was derived from J-pop.

K-pop has at times faced criticisms from journalists who perceive the music to be formulaic and unoriginal. Some K-Pop groups have been accused of plagiarizing Western music acts as well as other musical acts. In addition, K-pop has been criticized for its reliance on English phrases, with critics dubbing the use of English in titles "meaningless."

K-pop groups have been regularly accused of cultural appropriation of cultures such as African-American culture, especially due to the frequent use of cornrows and bandanas in idol groups' on-stage styling. Some have used blackface and racial slurs as part of their performances. However, debate exists about whether the borrowing of cultural elements from cultures outside of Korea indeed constitutes cultural appropriation, or if this cultural appropriation is negative at all. Crystal S. Anderson writes that "appropriating elements of a culture by taking them out of their original context and using them in a completely different way does not automatically constitute negative cultural appropriation."

==== Corruption ====
In 2002, Time magazine reported that Korean television producers such as Hwang Yong-woo and Kim Jong-jin had been arrested for "accepting under-the-table payments guaranteeing TV appearances to aspiring singers and musicians" in a bid to tackle "systemic corruption in South Korea's music business." Companies investigated included SidusHQ and SM Entertainment.

==== Working conditions ====
K-pop management companies have also been criticized for exploitation of idols through overwork and restrictive contracts, described as "slave contracts" in a BBC report. According to The Hollywood Reporter, "Korea's entertainment business is notoriously improvisational and unregulated. In-demand K-pop stars—many of whom are teenage 'idols'—have been known to rehearse and perform without sleep."

In July 2009, SM Entertainment was taken to court by TVXQ and a Super Junior member, who alleged that their working conditions had led to adverse health effects. The court decision in the TVXQ lawsuit determined their contract with SM Entertainment void, and resultantly the Fair Trade Commission released contract templates to regulate industry conditions.

In 2014, South Korea passed a law to regulate its music industry, protecting performers aged under 19 from unhealthy labor practices and overtly sexualized performances and guaranteeing them "the basic rights to learn, rest and sleep." Failure to comply with these regulations may lead to the equivalent of a US$10,000 fine.

Industry professionals such as SM Entertainment's CEO Kim Young-min have defended the system, arguing that individuals trained within the system are "no different than [sic] typical middle or high school kids, who go to after-school programs to cram for college entrance exams." Kim has also argued that there is a need to consider the expenses incurred by the company during the trainee period, including "facilities, equipment, costumes, and virtually everything the trainees need."

On March 7, 2017, the South Korea Fair Trade Commission (KFTC) passed new regulations in order to protect trainee idols from unfair terms and working conditions. Prior to these regulations, trainee idols at eight idol agencies were not permitted to seek contracts at any other agency while at training. Moreover, agencies were able to terminate a trainee contract at any time for any reason. The Fair Trade Commission states that they believe these changes will "result in a more just contract culture within the entertainment industry between trainee and agency." The Ministry of Culture applied these regulations to all existing agencies throughout 2018.

Some of the concerns raised by the idol agencies over these regulations include the risk of a trainee at one agency going undercover at another agency to receive training with the other agency. This introduces the further risk that the idol agencies must take in training new idols. Trainees train for three years on average and the agencies support these trainees with various training programs during this duration, resulting in each trainee being a very large investment for the agency.

==== Control over public image ====
K-pop management is very strict in terms of regulating the public appearance of their groups, according to Michael Hurt, a lecturer of cultural theory at the Korea National University of Arts. Therefore, he reasoned, most stars are not allowed to date publicly or have "control of their own lives". Kwon Joon-won, an entertainment management professor at the Dong-ah Institute of Media and Arts, said K-pop stars should be expected to lose half of their fandom if they were to make controversial statements. This may explain why K-pop groups are more outspoken about social issues abroad than within South Korea.

==== Sexualization and pressure on appearance ====
The industry has been criticized for the sexualization of both male and female idols, with the sexualization of minors in particular being of concern. Critics such as James Turnbull of the Korean Pop Culture blog The Grand Narrative have argued young female idols are especially susceptible to pressures to wear revealing clothing or dance provocatively. However, compared to western popular music, K-pop has little sex, drugs, or aggressive behavior and has a much more parent-friendly branding. In 2014, South Korea passed a law to protect idols under the age of 19 from overtly sexualized performances.

Questions have also been raised over K-pop's focus on appearance and its effects on children and teens, especially pressure to obtain cosmetic surgeries. In 2019, the South Korean Ministry of Gender Equality and Family announced non-mandatory guidelines in an effort to prevent "lookism." One recommendation asked to limit how many idol singers can appear on TV together, saying "most of them are skinny ... with outfits exposing their bodies." The concern was that their nearly identical appearances would narrow the standards of beauty. Many young viewers of K-pop are raised in a culture where cosmetic surgery is promoted. Some idols openly document themselves undergoing surgery. The government recommendations upset many fans, however, who began circulating an online petition in protest. An opposition politician also compared the guidelines to regulations under the "military dictatorship of Chun Doo-hwan".

==== Mental health and suicides ====
Some K-pop artists have suggested that the uncertainty and pressures of their jobs as entertainers may be detrimental to their mental health. According to musician Park Kyung of Block B, "There are many people who debuted with no sense of self yet, and they come to realize later that every move and every word they say is being observed so they become cautious and lose their freedom." In an interview with Yonhap News, Suga of BTS talked about his own mental health, and said, "Anxiety and loneliness seem to be with me for life...Emotions are so different in every situation and every moment, so I think to agonise every moment is what life is."

The suicides of prominent K-pop musicians have drawn attention to both industry and societal pressures. In 1996, singer Charles Park, also known as Seo Ji-won, died by suicide at the age of 19, before the release of his second album. Kim Jong-hyun, who had previously been open about his history of depression, also died by suicide in December 2017 at the age of 27. In the spring of 2018, a number of prominent Korean musicians participated in a free concert series to raise awareness of suicide prevention. In 2019 Sulli, a member of the girl group f(x), took her life and was followed one month later by her close friend Goo Hara. Both were subjected to cyberbullying, which added to calls for reform. In 2023, the death of Moonbin renewed scrutiny on the highly competitive world of Korean show business and the pressures its performers face.

One reason is that K-pop amplifies the pressure to be perfect, already intense in Korean society. After dating fellow musician Choiza, Sulli became the center of online abuse because K-pop idols are expected not to be in a relationship for years. During one talk show, she expressed how empty her life was, "I feel like I'm lying to everyone by pretending to be happy on the outside." A jewellery designer who works with K-pop stars, including Sulli, said that receiving threats and angry mail is normal for many idols.

== Culture ==
K-pop artists are frequently referred to as idols or idol groups. Groups usually have a leader, who is often the eldest or most experienced member and speaks for the group. The youngest group member is called the maknae (Korean: 막내; RR: mangnae; lit. 'the youngest in a family').

=== Industry-specific expressions ===
Expression	Meaning
Korean: 대상; RR: daesang	At music awards artists may receive a bonsang for outstanding music achievements. One of the bonsang ('major prize') winners is then awarded with a daesang, the "Grand Prize".
Korean: 본상; RR: bonsang	At music awards artists may receive a bonsang for outstanding music achievements. One of the bonsang ('major prize') winners is then awarded with a daesang, the "Grand Prize".
Comeback	Refers to the release of an artist's new music and the accompanying promotional activities typically including TV performances and participation on TV shows.
Title track	Roughly equivalent to a lead single, the main track of an album. Released with a music video and promoted through live performances on televised music shows.
Mini album	Roughly equivalent to an extended play, contains multiple tracks but shorter than a full-length album.

=== Events ===
==== Conventions and music festivals ====
- 2003–2018: Korean Music Festival at the Hollywood Bowl in Los Angeles
- 2011–present: K-POP World Festival in South Korea
- 2012–present: KCON in California
- 2015–present: KCON in New York and Japan

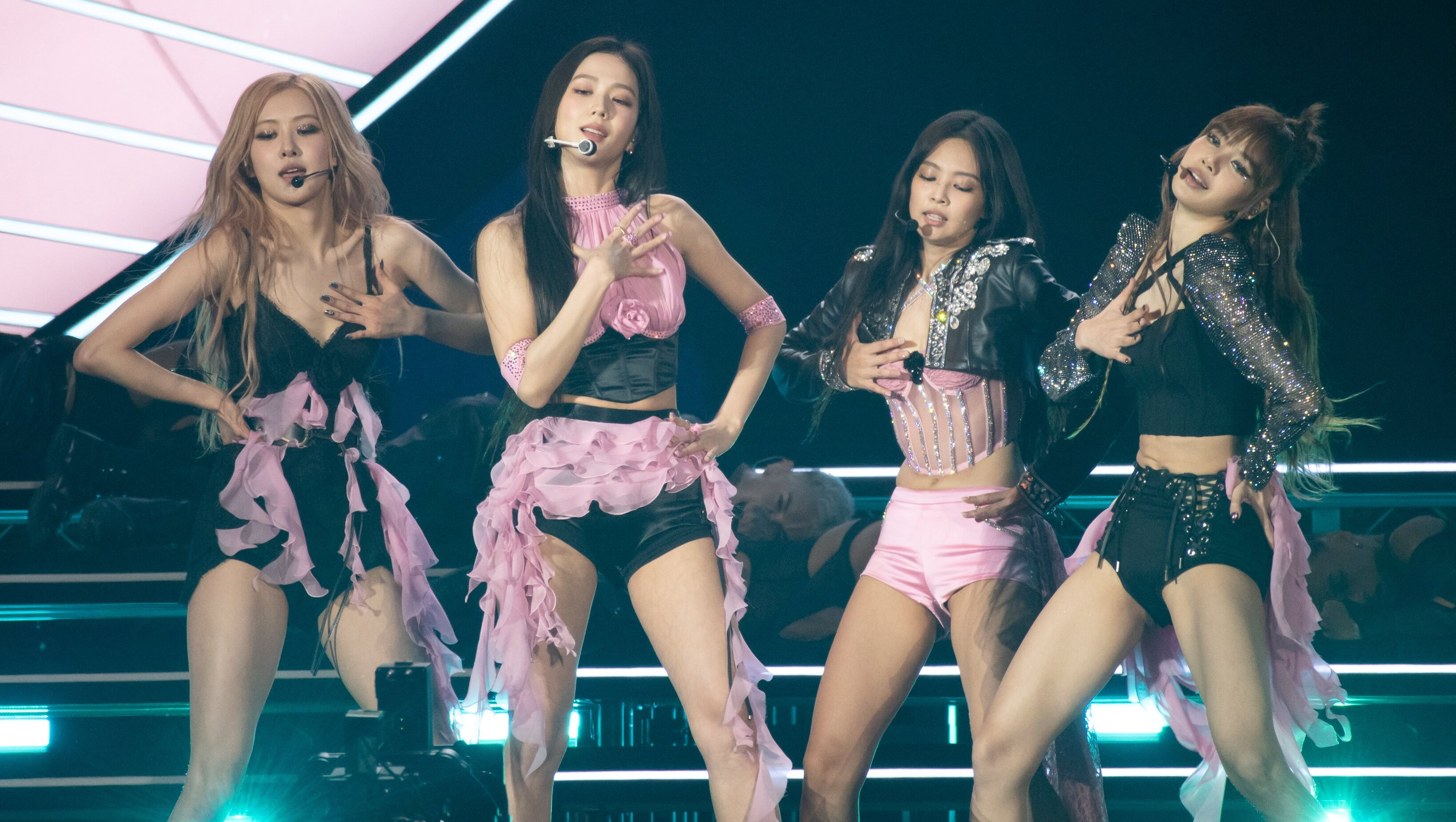
Blackpink performing at Coachella in 2023

With the rise of the popularity of K-pop globally, K-pop groups and idols' appearances at internationally recognized music festivals is becoming more and more regular.

- 2022: J-Hope at Lollapalooza (first K-pop act to headline)
- 2023: Blackpink at Coachella (first K-pop act to headline)
- 2024: Seventeen at Glastonbury (first K-pop act to perform on the Pyramid Stage)

== Foreign relations ==
On May 25, 2010, South Korea responded to the alleged North Korean sinking of a navy ship by broadcasting 4Minute's single "HuH" across the DMZ. In response, North Korea affirmed its decision to "destroy" any speakers set up along the border. That year, The Chosun Ilbo reported that the Ministry of National Defense had considered setting up large TV screens across the border to broadcast music videos by several popular K-pop girl groups such as Girls' Generation, Wonder Girls, After School, Kara and 4Minute as part of "psychological warfare" against North Korea. In September 2012, North Korea uploaded a video with a manipulated image of South Korean president Park Geun-hye performing the dance moves of "Gangnam Style." The video labeled her as a "devoted" admirer of the Yusin system of autocratic rule set up by her father, Park Chung Hee.

On May 7, 2013, U.S. President Barack Obama cited Psy's "Gangnam Style" as an example of how people around the world are being "swept up by Korean culture—the Korean Wave."

Since the early 2010s, several political leaders have acknowledged the global rise of Korean pop culture, most notably U.S. President Barack Obama, who made an official visit to South Korea in 2012 and mentioned the strong influences of social media networks, adding that it was "no wonder so many people around the world have caught the Korean wave, Hallyu." A few months later, U.N. Secretary-General Ban Ki-moon delivered a speech in front of the National Assembly of South Korea, where he noted South Korea's "great global success" in the fields of culture, sports and the arts, before pointing out that the Korean Wave was "making its mark on the world." This occurred a few days after U.S. State Department spokeswoman Victoria Nuland remarked in a daily press briefing that her daughter "loves Korean pop," which sparked a media frenzy in South Korea after a journalist from the country's publicly funded Yonhap News Agency arranged an interview with Nuland and described Nuland's teenage daughter as "crazy about Korean music and dance."

In November 2012, the British Minister of State for the Foreign Office, Hugo Swire, addressed a group of South Korean diplomats at the House of Lords, where he emphasized the close ties and mutual cooperation shaping South Korea–United Kingdom relations and added: "As 'Gangnam Style' has demonstrated, your music is global too." In February 2013, the Vice President of Peru, Marisol Espinoza, gave an interview with South Korea's Yonhap News Agency, where she voiced her desire for more South Korean companies to invest in her country and named K-pop as "one of the main factors that made Peruvian people wanting to get to know South Korea more."

According to an article published by the international relations magazine Foreign Policy, the spread of Korean popular culture across Southeast Asia, parts of South America, and parts of the Middle East are illustrating how the gradual cessation of European colonialism is giving way and making room for unexpected soft power outside of the Western world. On the other hand, an article published by The Quietus magazine expressed concern that discussions about Hallyu as a form of soft power seems to bear a whiff of the "old Victorian fear of Yellow Peril."

In August 2016, China proceeded to restrict Korean media, including K-pop, to protest South Korea's of deployment of U.S. THAAD systems. The move, which lasted until 2017, had a negative impact on the shares of Korean talent agencies, although prices later recovered.

On April 1, 2018, North Korean leader Kim Jong Un hosted a K-pop concert in Pyongyang.

== See also ==
- Culture of South Korea
- Korean ballad
- Korean hip-hop
- Korean idol
- Korean rock
- Korean Wave
- List of K-pop artists
- List of South Korean idol groups
- South Korean music

== Bibliography ==
- Hartong, Jan Laurens (2006). Musical Terms Worldwide: A Companion for the Musical Explorer. Semar Publishers. ISBN 978-88-7778-090-4.
- Holden, Todd Joseph Miles; Scrase, Timothy J. (2006). Medi@sia: Global Media/tion In and Out of Context. Taylor & Francis. ISBN 978-0-415-37155-1.
- Jung, Sun (2011). Korean Masculinities and Transcultural Consumption: Yonsama, Rain, Oldboy, K-Pop Idols. Hong Kong University Press. ISBN 978-988-8028-66-5.
- Kim, Myung Oak; Jaffe, Sam (2010). The New Korea: An Inside Look at South Korea's Economic Rise. AMACOM Div American Mgmt Assn. ISBN 978-0-8144-1489-7. Archived from the original on September 7, 2024.
- Winter, Velvet (April 30, 2023). "K-pop is taking over international music, but becoming a star is a long and restrictive road". ABC News (Australia). Archived from the original on May 20, 2023.
- K-Pop: A New Force in Pop Music (Korean Culture No. 2 ed.). Korean Culture and Information Service; Ministry of Culture, Sports and Tourism. 2011. ISBN 978-89-7375-166-2. Archived from the original (PDF) on April 28, 2015.
