= When Buckwheat Flowers Bloom =

1936 Korean short story by Lee Hyo-Seok

- Short story by Lee Hyo-Seok (이효석)
- Country: South Korea
- Language: Korean
- Genre: Romance

Publication
- Publication type: Periodical
- Publisher: Chosun Ilbo
- Publication date: 1936
- Published in English: 2004 (Lee Hyo-Seok Memorial Hall)

When the Buckwheat Flowers Bloom (Korean: 메밀꽃 필 무렵, romanized: Memilkkon pil muryeop) also translated as The Buckwheat Season is a 1936 short story by Korean writer Lee Hyo-seok. That story has been described as "widely known to Koreans for its lyrical qualities", "outstanding" and a "modern classic", and even "the pinnacle of literary art in Korea", and has been adopted into a movie directed by Lee Song-gu in 1967.

The story has been subject to studies by Korean literature scholars.

== Summary ==
Mr. Heo is a middle-aged itinerant vendor, who goes market to market to sell his products with his friend, Mr. Jo. Heo has never had a serious relationship with a woman, despite his age, and has no family. The only memory he has and cherishes is about the night in Bongpyeong when he met a woman and spent the night with her. He tells this story to his friend Jo over and over again on their journey. And one night, under a luminous moon, Heo and Jo walks on a mountain road covered with full-blown buckwheat flowers, with a young itinerant vendor, Dong-i, who has decided to travel with them for a moment. Naturally, Heo repeats his story once again, and Dong-i tells the story of his mother. She is from Bongpyeong, but she had to leave her hometown after she had sex with a stranger and got pregnant with her son, Dong-i. Heo listens to the story carefully until he trips and falls into a creek. Dong-i carries Heo on his back, and Heo feels 'the warmth sinking deep into his bone.' Then he finds out that Dong-i is left-handed, just like himself.

== Adaptations ==
The story has been adapted into several works in Korean:

- 이성구, <메밀꽃 필 무렵>, 1967. (영화) / Lee Seong-gu, Memilggot pil muryeop (When the Buckwheat Flowers Bloom), 1967. Film.
- 김하림, <TV문학관: 메밀꽃 필 무렵>, 1982. (드라마) / Kim Ha-rim, TV munhakgwan: Memilggot pil muryeop (TV Literature Hall: When the Buckwheat Flowers Bloom), KBS, 1982. TV Series.
- 홍윤정‧동희선, <HDTV문학관: 메밀꽃 필 무렵>, 2005. (드라마) / Hong Yun-jeong and Tong Hui-seon, HDTV munhakgwan: Memilggot pil muryeop (HDTV Literature Hall: When the Buckwheat Flowers Bloom), KBS, 2005. TV Series.
- 안재훈‧한혜진, <메밀꽃, 운수 좋은 날, 그리고 봄봄>, 2014. (애니메이션) / Ahn Jae-hun, Han Hye-jin, Memilggot, unsu joeun nal, geurigo bombom (Buckwheat Flowers, a Lucky Day, and Spring, Spring), Yeonpillo Myeongsang Hagi, EBS, Gimyoungsa, 2014. Animation.
- 김도연‧김별아 외 4, 《메밀꽃 질 무렵—메밀꽃 필 무렵 이어쓰기》, 단비, 2018. (재창작 소설) / Kim Do-yeon, Kim Byeora and four others, Memilggot jil muryeop—memilggot pil muryeop i-eo-sseugi (When the Buckwheat Flowers Are Falling: Rewriting When the Buckwheat Flowers Bloom), Danbi, 2018. Reworked short story collection.

It has also received a number of translations, including at least three into English language.
