= Yi Hyoseok =

Korean writer (1907–1942)

- Born: April 5, 1907; Bongpyeong, Gangwon Province, Korean Empire
- Died: May 25, 1942 (aged 35)
- Resting place: Pyeongchang County
- Education: Keijō Imperial University

Korean name
- Hangul: 이효석
- Hanja: 李孝石
- RR: I Hyoseok
- MR: I Hyosŏk

Yi Hyoseok (Korean: 이효석, April 5, 1907 – May 5, 1942) was a Korean writer.

== Biography ==
Yi Hyoseok, who wrote under the pen-name 'Gasan' (가산) was born on February 23, 1907, in Pyeongchang, Gangwon Province, Korean Empire. Yi was deeply impressed by Chekhov and Thomas Mann and graduated first in his class at the Gyeongseong Imperial University. Yi Hyoseok enrolled in Gyeongseong Imperial University in 1925, the same year, his poem “Spring” (Bom) was published in Maeil Sinbo. At Gyeongsong Yi published his poetry in a student magazine (Clear and Cool or Cheongnyang), and in a literary coterie journal (Friends in Literature or 무누). He graduated in 1930 with a degree in English Literature and worked for a short stint in the censorship section of the Police Affairs Division of the Japanese Government-General. Yi then moved to his wife's hometown of Gyeongseong, Hamgyeongbuk-do, where he worked as an English teacher. In 1934 he began teaching at Soongsil University in Pyeongyang. He died in May 1942 at the age of 35.

== Work ==
Yi Hyoseok wrote more than 70 pieces of fiction and first attracted attention of the literary world in 1928 when his story City and Ghost (Dosi-wa yuryeong) was published in Light of Korea (Joseon jigwang). Yi published many other works including Unanticipated Meeting (Giu), Shattered Red Lantern (Kkaetteuryeojineun hongdeung) and At Sea Near Russia (Noryeong geunhae), all of which reflected his socialist sympathies. Yi's work was self-consciously political and frequently focused on the lives of unfortunate women forced into prostitution, often combining his political message with explorations of sexuality. In 1933, however, coincident with increased pressure from Japanese occupiers that literature not be political, Yi Hyoseok helped found the League of Nine (Guinhoe), and abandoned political literature in favor of more aesthetic approaches. The Group of Nine included Jeong Ji-yong, Yi Sang, Kim Kirim, Lee Taejun all of whom influenced Yi Hyoseok.

Yi continued to be concerned with eroticism, but his focus also turned largely to nature. In his story Pig, Yi writes of a man who raises a sow, with the intent of building a pig farm, but superimposes human sexuality over the rutting of the pigs. In Bunnyeo, Yi explored a sexually wanton character. When Buckwheat Flowers Bloom (also known as The Buckwheat Season in English), Yi's most famous story, follows the story of an itinerant trader and the love he feels for a younger man, his son as the result of a one-night stand. That story has been described as "outstanding" and a "modern classic", and has been adopted into a movie directed by Lee Song-gu in 1967.

== Personal life ==
One of Yi's partners was the singer Wang Su-bok.

== Yi Hyoseok Village and Festival ==
When Buckwheat Blossoms Bloom is set in Yi's hometown of Bongpyeong-myeon, Pyeongchang-gun, and the area is still famous for its buckwheat production. The town is surrounded by a ring of 1,500-meter-tall (4,900 ft) mountains and the Yi Hyoseok Memorial Hall is located in the town inside the Yi Hyoseok Culture Village which, in 1990 was designated ‘the first national cultural village,’ by the Ministry of Culture and Tourism. The site features is a small river, a water mill house, a small thatched house and the inevitable miniature dioramas of the novel.

At the end of August to early September (the date differs each year) the annual Yi Hyoseok Cultural Festival takes place. The event is buckwheat themed and the events include an essay contest, a photo contest, a colorful parade and a variety of films and performances related to Buckwheat Blossoms. There is also an abundance of buckwheat based food, including excellent noodles and pancakes.

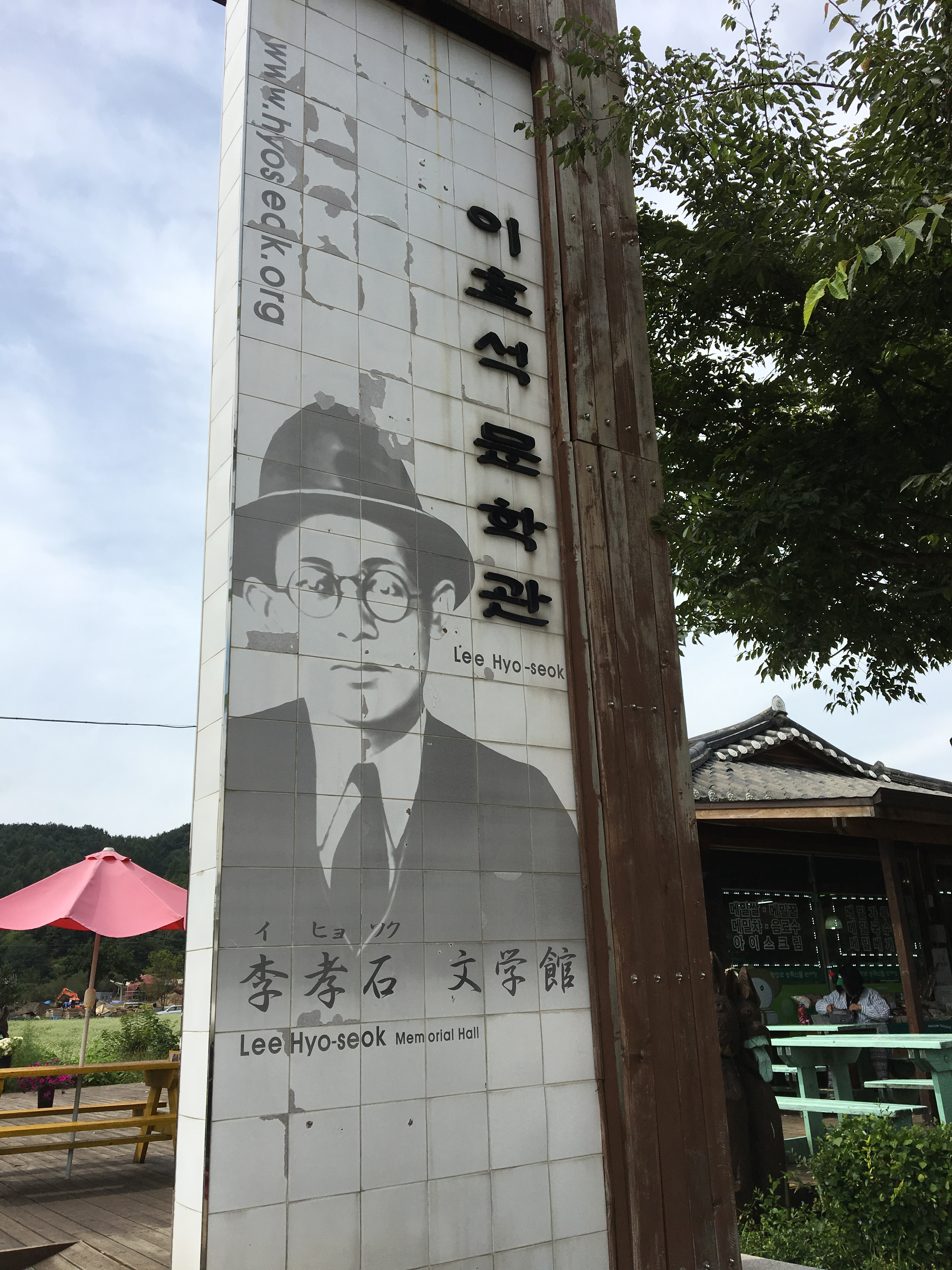
Yi Hyoseok Memorial Hall

== Works ==
- When Buckwheat Flowers Bloom / The Buckwheat Season (메밀꽃 필 무렵)
- KHI HOA KiẾU MẠCH NỚ (메밀꽃 필 무렵)
- Cuando florece el alforfón (이효석 단편선)
- Flower Dust
- Pollen (화분)
- Endless Blue Sky (벽공문한)
- Collected Works of Yi Hyoseok (효석전집)
