= History of Korean idols =

Evolution of Korean idol singers and performers

Korean idol groups began to appear in the early 20th century. Its earliest examples came in the form of vocal groups that both sang and danced. The most notable early example is the Jeogori Sisters, who debuted in 1939.

== 1930–70: Early vocal groups ==
In the 1930s through the 1950s, the earliest mainstream Korean idols consisted of vocal groups that sang and performed at the same time. One of the first girl groups was the Jeogori Sisters, who debuted around 1939, while one of the first boy groups to debut was the Arirang Boys. The first idols to go abroad were The Kim Sisters, a three-member girl group that performed in the U.S. and South Korea from the 1950s to the 1970s. With the success of The Kim Sisters, a number of "sisters-type" girl bands started to rise in popularity, including the Silver Bell Sisters (1954), Hyun Sisters (mid-1950s), Jung Sisters (mid-1950s), Lee Sisters (1962), Lily Sisters (1969), Bunny Girls (1971), and National Treasure Sisters (1981). However, these groups differed from the concept of idol groups associated with the Korean Wave and K-pop.

== 1980–95: Dance singers ==
In the mid-to-late 1980s, independent music that was founded in the newly introduced genres of disco, soul, and funk began to rise in popularity. The debuts of Sobangcha and Setorae in the 1980s is now considered to be the beginning of the current trend in boy and girl groups respectively. Korean dance singers and groups held performances based on Western dance music which combined exciting music and fancy dances, with the most prominent representatives of the movement being Sobangcha, Setorae, Kim Wan-sun, and Nami.

In the early 1990s, songs started to combine repeated rhythms of electronic dance music such as house, techno, and trance with a melody that gives a trot-like feeling. In addition, simple rap due to the influence of American hip hop was especially popular among teenagers. This musical composition is called "new generation dance music" and has been adopted by current idol music. These younger generations were exposed to new musical influences as they began to find and listen to foreign music that had not yet been introduced to Korea. Seo Taiji and Boys, who debuted in 1992, is often credited with this transformation of the K-pop genre, popularizing these western influences such as hip hop while targeting a younger audience.

In the 1990s, the South Korean government introduced state cultural policies to promote the industrialization and internationalization of Korean pop culture. In this context, an idol-training model began developing in the South Korean entertainment industry.

== 1996–2002: First-generation idols ==
In 1989, contemporary agency-fostering idol company SM Entertainment was founded, and in 1992, SM Entertainment put forward Hyun Jin-young, who was well-known as a "dancer", to debut as its first singer. However, in 1993, the company suffered financial difficulties when Hyun was discovered to be taking methamphetamine. As such, they attempted to establish a new training system for singers in which teenagers were selected through auditions to practice singing and dancing before eventually debuting as singers. The company then recouped the capital they invested during their debuts through record sales and performance activities. H.O.T. was the first group under this system to be presented by SM Entertainment.

The first-generation idol groups are usually groups of approximately five people, each of whom divided their roles into lead vocal, sub-vocal, dancer, and rapper. While singing on stage, their synchronous choreography, known as "group dance," was more sophisticated compared to previous dance music, but at the same time included "point choreography" that teenagers could easily imitate. Musical performances were done only for two or three songs in the album—the title song and follow-up song—and these songs were produced with music videos that showed each member's characteristics. After several months of performing, the singers took a break and resumed their career with their next album. This system became the basis for the second and third-generation idols.

The first-generation idol groups were mostly formed by SM Entertainment, which had a focus on mysterious images, and DSP Media, which had a focus on realistic images. The two were known to have a rivalry with each other. Boy groups such as SM's H.O.T. and DSP's Sechs Kies arose, both of which made their debuts with songs about social criticism and became popular for their rhythmical dance music. Shinhwa maintained the group's identity with their masculine visual appeal and strong audience reception, while g.o.d built a friendly image by appearing on entertainment shows and producing songs that many generations could relate to. Meanwhile, girl groups such as SM's S.E.S. and DSP's Fin.K.L. maintained a cute and pure girl image for the band. Later, S.E.S displayed a mysterious image, and Fin.K.L displayed a friendly image for the band members. Baby V.O.X and Diva had become popular for their strong female image as well.

First-generation idols lost popularity in the 2000s. They often lip-synced as they performed with a focus on choreography, and most of the audience recognised that the songs heavily relied on digital techniques to correct the vocals of the idol singers. As a result, many people began to question the authenticity and competency of the singers. In addition, a series of controversies had erupted in contracts with idol members and adjustment of profits, and the idol-training system relied on terrestrial broadcasting while the music market was being converted into digital centres. Eventually, idol groups were disbanded, such as Sechs Kies in 2000, H.O.T. in 2001, S.E.S. in 2002, and Fin.K.L declaring a halt to team activities in 2002.

== 2003–2011: Second-generation idols ==
With the decline of the first-generation idols in the early 2000s, solo singers from big agencies, such as BoA, Rain, and Seven, became popular alongside solo singers who were formerly part of a group, such as Kangta, Moon Hee-joon, Bada, Ock Joo-hyun, and Lee Hyori. TVXQ made their debut initially as an a cappella group in 2003, followed by SS501 and Super Junior in 2005 and Big Bang in 2006, but these groups were not as trendy as first-generation idols. The rise of second-generation idols can be attributed to the 2007 release of Wonder Girls’ "Tell Me", which became so popular that it was named a "syndrome." TVXQ, SS501, Super Junior and BigBang, all of which debuted earlier, subsequently joined the popularity triggered by Wonder Girls.

The second-generation idol groups usually consisted of six or more members, often formed a "group in a group" called a unit, and ran group and unit activities at the same time. The agencies tried to manage their idol groups more thoroughly than the first generation to prevent problems. They regularly evaluated trainees' singing and dancing abilities and ended contracts with trainees if their abilities did not improve or were significantly inferior. They also put an emphasis on personality and dismissed trainees whose behaviour was controversial.

The music released during this period consisted mainly of hook songs in which a short chorus was repeatedly presented, and most songs were deliberately composed similar to Western pop music to target foreign market listeners. Since the digitisation of the music market required frequent releases of albums and continuous exposure to the public to maximise profits as an agency, singles and extended plays with fewer tracks than regular albums became common. Unlike first-generation idols, second-generation idols appeared frequently on Korean variety shows and established "friendly images outside the stage" that were different from their "image on stage". Second-generation idols also extended their demographic to middle-aged people, and as a result introduced the term samchon fan, which referred to male fans in their 30s and 40s. Female fans of girl groups, called yeodeok, were also established.

The rivalry present in the first-generation idols was not as frequent among second-generation idols as concepts and music genres diversified. For girl groups, Wonder Girls and Girls' Generation, who also debuted in 2007, gained popularity together and were perceived to be rivals, but as more idol groups made their debuts, there were fewer instances of them being dubbed rivals. Wonder Girls, Kara, and Girls' Generation pursued an appealing image and were heavily influenced by the groups in the previous generation, with Kara resembling Fin.K.L. while Girls' Generation resembled S.E.S. Brown Eyed Girls became popular with both men and women for their own musical characteristics, while 2NE1, 4minute, f(x), and Miss A took on the independent female image akin to Baby V.O.X and Diva. Sistar, Girl's Day, and AOA pursued a sexy image, while Apink pursued a theme of innocence.

For male groups, TVXQ and BigBang were considered different from traditional idols as they created music that showed originality and maturity, and TVXQ in particular drew attention by releasing different albums from country to country. SS501 and Super Junior became popular because they introduced the concept of idol groups appearing on entertainment shows. SHINee built a pretty-boy kkonminam image, whereas 2PM pioneered a masculine and sexy image called jimseung-dol. 2PM's brother group 2AM established themselves as a ballad-focused idol group, while F.T. Island and CNBLUE did the same as band-type idol groups.

== 2012–2017: Third-generation idols ==
Idols that debuted in the 2010s are known as third-generation idols. EXO, who debuted in 2012, is considered to be the starting point for the third generation, particularly for boy groups. On the other hand, many girl groups disbanded after the Korea Fair Trade Commission stipulated in 2009 that exclusive contracts between agencies and celebrities could only last a maximum duration of seven years; as such, girl groups are generally classified as third-generation if they debuted in or after 2014. Some second-generation girl groups were categorized as "Generation 2.5" if they debuted in the transitional period between Generations 2 and 3, which includes groups that debuted from 2010 to 2013 such as Miss A, Sistar, Girl's Day, AOA, and Apink.

The idol groups' marketing strategy had become more diverse due to social media, which has led to the emergence of unprocessed, self-produced content on sites such as YouTube, AfreecaTV, and V App rather than through TV programs. Idol members also began to post on social networking services to get closer to their fans. In terms of planning, the "localisation" strategy expanded not only through releasing albums in different countries or performing in different languages but by including foreign, non-Korean members directly into groups. Idol groups such as I.O.I and Wanna One were selected and debuted on popular singing competition programs akin to American Idol. Since the mid-2010s, there have been more cases of second and third generation idols using group activity breaks to release records as solo singers and deviate from their groups' characteristics.

The concepts of third-generation idol groups have also evolved to be more nuanced as the number of girl groups targeting female audiences increased. In addition to their singing ability, Mamamoo, for example, attempted to utilise male attire in the title track of Pink Funky, which in turn gained them the "girl crush" image and was well received by their target audience. Lovelyz chose their concept to be "girls seen from a girl's gaze." GFriend took on a concept reminiscent of "healthy youth" and bore the innocent image of S.E.S., Fin.K.L, and Girls’ Generation.

== 2018-2022: Fourth-generation idols ==
Idols that debuted from around 2018 onward are generally referred to as fourth-generation idols. Compared with earlier generations, these groups placed a greater emphasis on international markets from their debut and relied more heavily on digital platforms to communicate with fans. Girl groups such as aespa, NewJeans and Le Sserafim, which debuted after the outbreak of the COVID-19 pandemic, gained global fan bases soon after their debuts, whereas third-generation acts had typically needed four to five years to do so. Fourth-generation girl groups were also noted for their diversity in sound and style, and their album sales challenged the long-held view that girl groups sold fewer albums than boy groups. Many fourth-generation groups built elaborate fictional universes and storylines around their music.

== 2023-present: Fifth-generation idols ==
Groups that debuted from 2023 onward, such as Zerobaseone, Riize, BoyNextDoor and Illit, have been described as fifth generation of K-pop idols, although the label is informal and the generation was still considered taking shape in 2025. Korean media reported that fifth-generation groups focused on expanding their popularity amid low profitability in the industry. Rather than relying on the large fictional universes of their predecessors, several fifth-generation groups sought to stand out through distinct musical identities, such as Riize's "emotional pop".

== Sources ==
- 김성윤 (2016). 《덕후감》. 경기: 북인더갭. ISBN 9791185359106.
- 미묘 외 (2016). 《아이돌 연감 2015》. 서울: 아이돌로지. ISBN 9791195772209.
- 박영웅; 임희윤; 엄동진; 김윤하 (2015). 《K-POP으로 보는 대중문화 트렌드 2016》. 서울: 마리북스. ISBN 9788994011608.
- 이규탁 (2016). 《케이팝의 시대》. 경기: 한울아카데미. ISBN 9788946059085.
- 이동연 외 (2011). 《아이돌: HOT에서 소녀시대까지 아이돌 문화 보고서》. 서울: 이매진. ISBN 9788993985467.
