= Taegisan =

Mountain in South Korea

Highest point
- Elevation: 1,258.8 m (4,130 ft)

Geography
- Location: South Korea

Korean name
- Hangul: 태기산
- Hanja: 泰岐山
- RR: Taegisan
- MR: T'aegisan

Taegisan (Korean: 태기산) is a mountain in the counties of Hoengseong and Pyeongchang, Gangwon Province, South Korea. It has an elevation of 1,258.8 m (4,130 ft).

== See also ==
- List of mountains in Korea
