= List of King of Mask Singer episodes =

This is a list of episodes of the South Korean variety-music show King of Mask Singer. The show airs on MBC as part of their Sunday Night lineup.

== Overview ==
Year	Broadcast type	Broadcast period		Mask King generations	Episodes
Year	Broadcast type	First aired	Last aired	Mask King generations	Episodes
2015	Pilot	February 18, 2015		1	1
2015	Regular	April 5, 2015	December 27, 2015	19	39
2015	Special Live	September 11, 2015		1	1
2016	Regular	January 3, 2016	December 25, 2016	26	52
2016	Special Live	October 5, 2016		1	1
2017	Regular	January 1, 2017	September 3, 2017	21	43
2017	Regular	November 19, 2017 (Note: September 10 – November 12, 2017: From September 4, 2017 to November 15, 2017, Munhwa Broadcasting's labour union went on strike over the influence of the state over the network. No programming aired during the work stoppage. Postponed episodes aired after labour stoppage ended.)	December 31, 2017	21	43
2018	Regular	January 7, 2018	August 12, 2018	25	50
2018	Regular	September 2, 2018	December 30, 2018	25	50
2018	Special Live ("The Winner")	September 7, 2018 (Live); September 16, 2018 (Re-airing)		—N/a	1
2019	Regular	January 6, 2019	June 23, 2019	25	51
2019	Regular	July 7, 2019 (Note: June 30, 2019: The program was pre-empted because of news coverage of the 2019 Koreas–United States DMZ Summit. Postponed episode aired on July 7.)	December 29, 2019	25	51
2020	Regular	January 5, 2020	December 27, 2020	26	52
2021	Regular	January 3, 2021	December 26, 2021	24	50
2022	Regular	January 2, 2022	December 25, 2022	24	48
2023	Regular	January 8, 2023	December 31, 2023	24	47
2024	Regular	January 7, 2024	December 22, 2024	23	45
2025	Regular	January 12, 2025	December 28, 2025	TBA	TBA
2026	Regular	January 4, 2026	TBA	TBA	TBA
