= List of King of Mask Singer episodes (2025) =

South Korean variety-music show

- No. of episodes: 47

Release
- Original network: MBC
- Original release: January 12, 2025 – present

Season chronology
- ← Previous; 2024 Next → 2026

This is a list of episodes of the South Korean variety-music show King of Mask Singer in 2025. The show airs on MBC as part of their Sunday Night lineup. The names listed below are in performance order.

– Contestant is instantly eliminated by the live audience and judging panel
– After being eliminated, contestant performs a prepared song for the next round and takes off their mask during the instrumental break
– After being eliminated and revealing their identity, contestant has another special performance.
– Contestant advances to the next round.
– Contestant becomes the challenger.
– Mask King.

== Episodes ==
=== 237th Generation Mask King ===
- Contestants: Ryu In-a, Kim Seung-hye, Eloi Kwon, Shin Seong, Nam You-jung, Kim Joon, Jung Hye-in, Jo Jeong-hyeon
Episode 478 - 479

Episode 478

Episode 478 was broadcast on January 12, 2025, skipping two weeks.

Order	Stage Name	Real Name	Song	Original artist	Vote
Opening Special	Deliverer of Happiness	Insooni	Happy (행복)	Insooni	
Round 1
Pair 1	Everyday Christmas	Ryu In-a	I Still Don’t Know Love (난 아직 사랑을 몰라)	Lee Ji-yeon	87
Pair 1	Waking Up To The 26th	Kim Seung-hye	I Still Don’t Know Love (난 아직 사랑을 몰라)	Lee Ji-yeon	12
2nd song	Waking Up To The 26th	Kim Seung-hye	I Really Like You (니가 참 좋아)	Jewelry	-
Pair 2	Tiramisu Cake	Eloi Kwon	Stigma (낙인)	Yim Jae-beom	12
Pair 2	Marshmallow Cookie	Shin Seong	Stigma (낙인)	Yim Jae-beom	87
2nd song	Tiramisu Cake	Eloi Kwon	Il Mondo	Jimmy Fontana	-
Pair 3	Handbell	Nam You-jung	I To You, You To Me (너에게 난 나에게 넌)	Jatanpung	55
Pair 3	Christmas Carol	Kim Joon	I To You, You To Me (너에게 난 나에게 넌)	Jatanpung	44
2nd song	Christmas Carol	Kim Joon	Love Rain (사랑비)	Kim Tae-woo	-
Pair 4	Gift Bundle	Jung Hye-in	Like Rain, Like Music (비처럼 음악처럼)	Kim Hyun-sik	14
Pair 4	Christmas Candle	Jo Jeong-hyun	Like Rain, Like Music (비처럼 음악처럼)	Kim Hyun-sik	85
2nd song	Gift Bundle	Jung Hye-in	It’s Strange, With You (묘해, 너와)	Acoustic Collabo	-

Episode 479

Episode 479 was broadcast on January 19, 2025.

Order	Stage Name	Real Name	Song	Original artist	Vote
Round 2
Pair 1	Everyday Christmas	Ryu In-a	My Destiny	Lyn	35
Pair 1	Marshmallow Cookie	Shin Seong	Dear Love (사랑아)	The One	64
Pair 2	Handbell	Nam You-jung	Expectation (기대)	Na Yoon-kwon	10
Pair 2	Christmas Candle	Jo Jeong-hyun	Time (세월)	Kim Soo-chul	89
Round 3
Finalists	Marshmallow Cookie	Shin Seong	Family Portrait (가족사진)	Kim Jin-ho	33
Finalists	Christmas Candle	Jo Jeong-hyun	Last Love (끝사랑)	Kim Bum-soo	66
Final
Battle	Christmas Candle	Jo Jeong-hyun	Previous three songs were used as voting standard		35
Battle	Perfume Over Flowers	Jung Joon-il	Station (정류장)	Panic	64
Special	Christmas Candle	Jo Jeong-hyun	I Even Loved the Pain (그 아픔까지 사랑한거였어)	Jo Jeong-hyun	-

=== 238th Generation Mask King ===
- Contestants: sokodomo, Wonjin of (CRAVITY), EJel, Baek Bong-ki, Lee Jae-youl, Yein of (Lovelyz), Chae Eun-jung of (Cleo), Taehyun of (DickPunks)
Episode 480 - 481

Episode 480

Episode 480 was broadcast on January 26, 2025.

Order	Stage Name	Real Name	Song	Original artist	Vote
Round 1
Pair 1	Snake Charmer	sokodomo	Boat	george	24
Pair 1	Luck-Bringing Snake	Wonjin of CRAVITY	Boat	george	75
2nd song	Snake Charmer	sokodomo	W.H.I.T.E (화이트)	Yoo Young-suk	-
Pair 2	Sunrise	EJel	Love is Like a Glass (사랑은 우리같은 것)	Won Jun-hee	71
Pair 2	Year Of The Blue Snake	Baek Bong-ki	Love is Like a Glass (사랑은 우리같은 것)	Won Jun-hee	28
2nd song	Year Of The Blue Snake	Baek Bong-ki	To a Laday (숙녀에게)	Byun Jin-sub	-
Pair 3	Grilled Short Rib Patties	Lee Jae-youl	Every Day, Every Moment (모든 날, 모든 순간)	Paul Kim	14
Pair 3	Braised Beef	Yein of Lovelyz	Every Day, Every Moment (모든 날, 모든 순간)	Paul Kim	85
2nd song	Grilled Short Rib Patties	Lee Jae-youl	Aroha (아로하)	Cool	-
Pair 4	Madam Living The Present Life	Chae Eun-jung of Cleo	Tears (눈물)	Flower	29
Pair 4	Scholar Living The Diligent Life	Taehyun of DickPunks	Tears (눈물)	Flower	70
2nd song	Madam Living The Present Life	Chae Eun-jung of Cleo	Young Love (애송이의 사랑)	Yangpa	-

Episode 481

Episode 481 was broadcast on February 2, 2025.

Order	Stage Name	Real Name	Song	Original artist	Vote
Round 2
Pair 1	Luck-Bringing Snake	Wonjin of CRAVITY	Boom Boom Bass (붐붐베이스)	RIIZE	47
Pair 1	Sunrise	EJel	Romantic Cat (낭만 고양이)	Cherry Filter	52
Pair 2	Braised Beef	Yein of Lovelyz	Solar System (태양계)	Sung Si-kyung	10
Pair 2	Scholar Living The Diligent Life	Taehyun of DickPunks	Laundry (빨래)	Lee Juck	89
Round 3
Finalists	Sunrise	EJel	In Dreams (꿈에)	Lena Park	37
Finalists	Scholar Living The Diligent Life	Taehyun of DickPunks	The More I Love (사랑할수록)	Boohwal	62
Final
Battle	Scholar Living The Diligent Life	Taehyun of DickPunks	Previous three songs were used as voting standard		33
Battle	Perfume Over Flowers	Jung Joon-il	For a Thousand Days (천일동안)	Lee Seung-hwan	66

=== 239th Generation Mask King ===
- Contestants: Chungju Man, Kyuri, Lee Ji-hye, Jung Eui-yoon, Hong Dae-kwang, Wooseok of (Pentagon), Lee Hyun-young, Kang Sung-jin
Episode 482 - 483

Episode 482

Episode 482 was broadcast on February 16, 2025, skipping a week to broadcast the 2025 Harbin Asian Winter Games.

Order	Stage Name	Real Name	Song	Original artist	Vote
Round 1
Pair 1	Heater	Chungju Man	On the Road (거리에서)	Sung Si-kyung	17
Pair 1	Electric Blanket	Kyuri	On the Road (거리에서)	Sung Si-kyung	82
2nd song	Heater	Chungju Man	Do You Want to Walk With Me? (나랑 같이 걸을래)	Jukjae	-
Pair 2	Girls’ Generation	Lee Ji-hye	Refuge (기댈곳)	Psy	91
Pair 2	The Wild Age	Jung Eui-yoon	Refuge (기댈곳)	Psy	8
2nd song	The Wild Age	Jung Eui-yoon	Drink Makgeolli (막걸리 한잔)	Kang Jin	-
Pair 3	Vacation Homework	Hong Dae-kwang	I Love You… (사랑합니다…)	Tim	85
Pair 3	Daily Schedule	Wooseok of Pentagon	I Love You… (사랑합니다…)	Tim	14
2nd song	Daily Schedule	Wooseok of Pentagon	Alone (외톨이야)	CNBLUE	-
Pair 4	Needle	Lee Hyun-young	Butterfly	Loveholics	35
Pair 4	Thread	Kang Sung-jin	Butterfly	Loveholics	64
2nd song	Needle	Lee Hyun-young	Bye Bye (습관)	Roller Coaster	-

Episode 483

Episode 483 was broadcast on February 23, 2025.

Order	Stage Name	Real Name	Song	Original artist	Vote
Round 2
Pair 1	Electric Blanket	Kyuri	Fine	Taeyeon	39
Pair 1	Girls’ Generation	Lee Ji-hye	Night Sea (밤, 바다)	Choi Yu-ree	60
Pair 2	Vacation Homework	Hong Dae-kwang	Would You Like to Walk With Me? (같이 걸을까)	Lee Juck	86
Pair 2	Thread	Kang Sung-jin	My Beloved One (내 사람입니다)	The Nuts	13
Round 3
Finalists	Girls’ Generation	Lee Ji-hye	Magic Lily (상사화)	Ahn Ye-eun	48
Finalists	Vacation Homework	Hong Dae-kwang	Next Winter (새겨울)	Joonil Jung	51
Final
Battle	Vacation Homework	Hong Dae-kwang	Previous three songs were used as voting standard		18
Battle	Perfume Over Flowers	Jung Joon-il	Recede (멀어지다)	NELL	81

=== 240th Generation Mask King ===
- Contestants: Jeon Young-su, Blasé, Kim Sa-wol, Jooyeon of (Xdinary Heroes), Joo Jong-hyuk, Jimin of (CLASS;Y), Kim Si-duck, Hwang Seok-jeong
Episode 484 - 485

Episode 484

Episode 484 was broadcast on March 2, 2025.

Order	Stage Name	Real Name	Song	Original artist	Vote
Round 1
Pair 1	Passionate Student	Jeon Young-su	When the Cold Wind Blows (찬바람이 불면)	Kim Ji-yeon	21
Pair 1	Star Instructor	Blasé	When the Cold Wind Blows (찬바람이 불면)	Kim Ji-yeon	78
2nd song	Passionate Student	Jeon Young-su	Octopus’ Dream (문어의 꿈)	Ahn Ye-eun	-
Pair 2	Bibbidi Bobbidi Boo	Kim Sa-wol	Ending Scene (이런 엔딩)	IU	16
Pair 2	Hakuna Matata	Jooyeon of Xdinary Heroes	Ending Scene (이런 엔딩)	IU	83
2nd song	Bibbidi Bobbidi Boo	Kim Sa-wol	It is Love (사랑이야)	Song Chang-sik	-
Pair 3	Round And Around	Joo Jong-hyuk	Although We Say I Love You (사랑한다 말해도)	Kim Dong-ryul	50
Pair 3	APT APT	Jimin of CLASS;Y	Although We Say I Love You (사랑한다 말해도)	Kim Dong-ryul	49
2nd song	APT APT	Jimin of CLASS;Y	Fate (인연)	Lee Sun-hee	-
Pair 4	Mortar	Kim Si-duck	Every Night (밤이면 밤마다)	Insooni	25
Pair 4	Mugwort Rice Cake	Hwang Seok-jeong	Every Night (밤이면 밤마다)	Insooni	74
2nd song	Mortar	Kim Si-duck	Tears	Lee Byung-hun	-

Episode 485

Episode 485 was broadcast on March 9, 2025.

Order	Stage Name	Real Name	Song	Original artist	Vote
Round 2
Pair 1	Star Instructor	Blasé	Only You	2PM	22
Pair 1	Hakuna Matata	Jooyeon of Xdinary Heroes	Ten Years’ Promise (10년의 약속)	Exhibition	77
Pair 2	Round And Around	Joo Jong-hyuk	Incurable Disease (난치병)	Hareem	69
Pair 2	Mugwort Rice Cake	Hwang Seok-jeong	Daejeon’s Blues (대전 블루스)	Ahn Jung-ae	30
Round 3
Finalists	Hakuna Matata	Jooyeon of Xdinary Heroes	Secret (비밀)	Boohwal	54
Finalists	Round And Around	Joo Jong-hyuk	Tears are Bitter (눈물이 쓰다)	Byun Jin-sub	45
Final
Battle	Hakuna Matata	Jooyeon of Xdinary Heroes	Previous three songs were used as voting standard		22
Battle	Perfume Over Flowers	Jung Joon-il	How Can I Love the Heartbreak, You’re the One I Love (어떻게 이별까지 사랑하겠어, 널 사랑하는 거지)	AKMU	77

=== 241st Generation Mask King ===
- Contestants: Song Ha-yea, Park Min-su, Grizzly, Cho Won-hee, Juniel, Seo Eve, Park So-young, Junyfore
Episode 486 - 487

Episode 486

Episode 486 was broadcast on March 16, 2025.

Order	Stage Name	Real Name	Song	Original artist	Vote
Round 1
Pair 1	Blind Date	Song Ha-yea	Partner for Life (내 사람)	SG Wannabe	74
Pair 1	Naturally Ordering More Dumplings	Park Min-su	Partner for Life (내 사람)	SG Wannabe	25
2nd song	Naturally Ordering More Dumplings	Park Min-su	Return (되돌리다)	Lee Seung-gi	-
Pair 2	Fat Cat	Grizzly	Early Morning Discount (조조할인)	Lee Moon-sae	94
Pair 2	Muscular Dog	Cho Won-hee	Early Morning Discount (조조할인)	Lee Moon-sae	5
2nd song	Muscular Dog	Cho Won-hee	I Am a Man (난 남자다)	Kim Jang-hoon	-
Pair 3	White Peach	Juniel	Sorrow (애상)	Cool	71
Pair 3	Yellow Peach	Seo Eve	Sorrow (애상)	Cool	28
2nd song	Yellow Peach	Seo Eve	Travel (여행)	BOL4	-
Pair 4	About Time	Park So-young	A Southbound Train (남행열차)	Kim Soo-hee	13
Pair 4	Notting Hill	Junyfore	A Southbound Train (남행열차)	Kim Soo-hee	86
2nd song	About Time	Park So-young	Adult Ceremony (성인식)	Park Ji-yoon	-

Episode 487

Episode 487 was broadcast on March 23, 2025.

Order	Stage Name	Real Name	Song	Original artist	Vote
Round 2
Pair 1	Blind Date	Song Ha-yea	Teddy Bear (곰인형)	Lyn	76
Pair 1	Fat Cat	Grizzly	Drowning	WOODZ	23
Pair 2	White Peach	Juniel	A Poem Titled ‘You’ (그대라는 시)	Taeyeon	43
Pair 2	Notting Hill	Junyfore	Always (언제나)	Huh Gak	56
Round 3
Finalists	Blind Date	Song Ha-yea	This Love (이 사랑)	Davichi	60
Finalists	Notting Hill	Junyfore	Requiem (진혼)	YADA	39
Special	Notting Hill	Junyfore	The Tears From the End of Seventh Heaven (하늘 끝에서 흘린 눈물)	Junyfore	-
Final
Battle	Blind Date	Song Ha-yea	Previous three songs were used as voting standard		41
Battle	Perfume Over Flowers	Jung Joon-il	That I Was Once By Your Side (내가 너의 곁에 잠시 살았다는 걸)	Toy	58

=== 242nd Generation Mask King ===
- Contestants: GG-Dragon, Yoon Hyun-sang, Jang Min-je, Jeong Jung-sik of (Lunch), Chael of (LUN8), Jung Mi-ae, Ra.D, Lee Bon
Episode 488 - 489

Episode 488

Episode 488 was broadcast on March 30, 2025.

Order	Stage Name	Real Name	Song	Original artist	Vote
Round 1
Pair 1	Overcrowded Bus	GG-Dragon	Live One Year in Winter (일년을 겨울에 살아)	Brian	7
Pair 1	Columbus	Yoon Hyun-sang	Live One Year in Winter (일년을 겨울에 살아)	Brian	92
2nd song	Overcrowded Bus	GG-Dragon	Untitled, 2014 (무제)	G-Dragon	-
Pair 2	Blue Jeans	Jang Min-je	Take Good Care of Me (잘 부탁드립니다)	Ex	50
Pair 2	Squid	Jeong Jung-sik of Lunch	Take Good Care of Me (잘 부탁드립니다)	Ex	49
2nd song	Squid	Jeong Jung-sik of Lunch	Tonight My Heart (오늘 밤 내 맘은)	Jo Ha-moon	-
Special	Squid & Drifting Asleep Air Conditioner	Jeong Jung-sik of Lunch & Hwang Ga-ram of Pinnochio	I Am Firefly (나는 반딧불)	Lunch	-
Pair 3	Vietnamese Spring Roll	Chael of LUN8	What If (만약에 말야)	Noel	28
Pair 3	Royal Hot Pot	Jung Mi-ae	What If (만약에 말야)	Noel	71
2nd song	Vietnamese Spring Roll	Chael of LUN8	Officially Missing You	Geeks and Soyou	-
Pair 4	Shy Boy	Ra.D	Springirls (봄처녀)	Sunwoo Jung-a	49
Pair 4	Girl Crush	Lee Bon	Springirls (봄처녀)	Sunwoo Jung-a	50
2nd song	Shy Boy	Ra.D	Reflection of You in Your Smile (미소속에 비친 그대)	Shin Seung-hun	-

Episode 489

Episode 489 was broadcast on April 6, 2025.

Order	Stage Name	Real Name	Song	Original artist	Vote
Round 2
Pair 1	Columbus	Yoon Hyun-sang	Annie	Yoon Jong-shin	27
Pair 1	Blue Jeans	Jang Min-je	Well… (있잖아)	IU	72
Pair 2	Royal Hot Pot	Jung Mi-ae	Memory Loss (기억상실)	Gummy	86
Pair 2	Girl Crush	Lee Bon	Waiting, Touching (기다림, 설레임)	Kang Huh Da-lim	13
Round 3
Finalists	Blue Jeans	Jang Min-je	To My Life (나의 사춘기에게)	BOL4	13
Finalists	Royal Hot Pot	Jung Mi-ae	Yeol-ae (열애)	Yoon Shi-nae	86
Final
Battle	Royal Hot Pot	Jung Mi-ae	Previous three songs were used as voting standard		46
Battle	Perfume Over Flowers	Jung Joon-il	I’m My Fan (팬이야)	Jaurim	53

=== 243rd Generation Mask King ===
- Contestants: Kim Ji-yoon, Jang Hyun-seung, Shin Hae-sol, Oh Jin-sung of (izi), Orbit, Choi Jung-eun of (izna), Kim Hyo-jin, Im Se-jun
Episode 490 - 491

Episode 490

Episode 490 was broadcast on April 13, 2025.

Order	Stage Name	Real Name	Song	Original artist	Vote
Round 1
Pair 1	Tart	Kim Ji-yoon	You’re Acting Strange (왜 그래)	Kim Hyun-chul	14
Pair 1	Pretzel	Jang Hyun-seung	You’re Acting Strange (왜 그래)	Kim Hyun-chul	85
2nd song	Tart	Kim Ji-yoon	You Let Me Go With a Smile (미소를 띄우며 나를 보낸 그 모습처럼)	Lee Eun-ha	-
Pair 2	Bouquet	Shin Hae-sol	I Am Breaking Up Myself (헤어지는 중입니다)	Lee Eun-mi	83
Pair 2	Flower Road	Oh Jin-sung of izi	I Am Breaking Up Myself (헤어지는 중입니다)	Lee Eun-mi	16
2nd song	Flower Road	Oh Jin-sung of izi	After Love (사랑한 후에)	Shin Sung-woo	-
Pair 3	Intellectual Man	Orbit	Friend (친구)	Ahn Jae-wook	17
Pair 3	Nerdy Girl	Choi Jung-eun of izna	Friend (친구)	Ahn Jae-wook	82
2nd song	Intellectual Man	Orbit	How I Am (그게 나야)	Kim Dong-ryul	-
Pair 4	Sweet Nap	Kim Hyo-jin	Shiny Star (밤하늘의 별을)	Kiroy Y (with KCM and No Noo)	15
Pair 4	Sleepless Night	Im Se-jun	Shiny Star (밤하늘의 별을)	Kiroy Y (with KCM and No Noo)	84
2nd song	Sweet Nap	Kim Hyo-jin	In the Journey of My Life (살다보면)	Kwon Jin-won	-

Episode 491

Episode 491 was broadcast on April 20, 2025.

Order	Stage Name	Real Name	Song	Original artist	Vote
Round 2
Pair 1	Pretzel	Jang Hyun-seung	Love on my Heart (내 마음에 비친 내 모습)	Yoo Jae-ha	25
Pair 1	Bouquet	Shin Hae-sol	Kill This Love	BLACKPINK	74
Pair 2	Nerdy Girl	Choi Jung-eun of izna	Fire	Taeyeon	35
Pair 2	Sleepless Night	Im Se-jun	6:35PM (시계 바늘)	Kwon Jin-ah	64
Round 3
Finalists	Bouquet	Shin Hae-sol	Don’t You Know (모르시나요)	Davichi	79
Finalists	Sleepless Night	Im Se-jun	No One Else Like That (그런 사람 또 없습니다)	Lee Seung-chul	20
Final
Battle	Bouquet	Shin Hae-sol	Previous three songs were used as voting standard		33
Battle	Perfume Over Flowers	Jung Joon-il	Dear Name (이름에게)	IU	66

=== 244th Generation Mask King ===
- Contestants: Park Jang-hyun, Hwang Min-ho, Yechan, Kim Jae-hyun of (N.Flying), Hyerim Kim, Lee Mi-young, Keena of (FIFTY FIFTY), Bada Kim
Episode 492 - 493

Episode 492

Episode 492 was broadcast on April 27, 2025.

Order	Stage Name	Real Name	Song	Original artist	Vote
Round 1
Pair 1	Picnic Lunch Box	Park Jang-hyun	I Loved You (사랑했어요)	Kim Hyun-sik	55
Pair 1	Hearty School Lunch	Hwang Min-Ho	I Loved You (사랑했어요)	Kim Hyun-sik	44
2nd song	Hearty School Lunch	Hwang Min-ho	All You Need is Love (사미인곡)	Seomoon Tak	-
Pair 2	Golden Lady	Yechan	Cleaning (청소)	THERAY	91
Pair 2	Smile Gentleman	Kim Jae-hyun of N.Flying	Cleaning (청소)	THERAY	8
2nd song	Smile Gentleman	Kim Jae-hyun of N.Flying	Confession (고백)	Deli Spice	-
Pair 3	Children’s Day	Hyerim Kim	My Heart to You (내 마음 당신 곁으로)	Kim Jeong-soo	83
Pair 3	Parents’ Day	Lee Mi-young	My Heart to You (내 마음 당신 곁으로)	Kim Jeong-soo	16
2nd song	Parents’ Day	Lee Mi-young	Joy (환희)	Chung Soo-ra	-
Pair 4	Haenyeo That Loved The Ocean	Keena of FIFTY FIFTY	Don’t Worry (걱정말아요 그대)	Jeon In-kwon	40
Pair 4	Captain Dreaming Of A Full Ship	Bada Kim	Don’t Worry (걱정말아요 그대)	Jeon In-kwon	59
2nd song	Haenyeo That Loved The Ocean	Keena of FIFTY FIFTY	Forever Young	BLACKPINK	-

Episode 493

Episode 493 was broadcast on May 4, 2025.

Order	Stage Name	Real Name	Song	Original artist	Vote
Round 2
Pair 1	Picnic Lunch Box	Park Jang-hyun	Beautiful	Crush	40
Pair 1	Golden Lady	Yechan	Forest (숲)	Choi Yu-ree	59
Pair 2	Children’s Day	Hyerim Kim	Comet (혜성)	Younha	25
Pair 2	Captain Dreaming Of A Full Ship	Bada Kim	Beautiful Restriction (아름다운 구속)	Kim Jong-seo	74
Round 3
Finalists	Golden Lady	Yechan	First Line (첫 줄)	Shin Yong-jae	60
Finalists	Captain Dreaming Of A Full Ship	Bada Kim	I’ll Love Everything (모두 다 사랑하리)	Songgolmae	39
Final
Battle	Golden Lady	Yechan	Previous three songs were used as voting standard		27
Battle	Perfume Over Flowers	Jung Joon-il	I	Taeyeon	72

=== 245th Generation Mask King ===
- Contestants: Harimu, Jin Won of (Libelante), Choi Nakta, Hong Kyung-min, Kan Mi-youn of (Baby V.O.X.), Natty of (KISS OF LIFE), Song Pyl-geun, Yangpa
Episode 494 - 495

Episode 494

Episode 494 was broadcast on May 11, 2025.

Order	Stage Name	Real Name	Song	Original artist	Vote
Round 1
Pair 1	Dancing Queen	Harimu	Relieved (다행이다)	Kim Dong-ryul	12
Pair 1	Balance King	Jin Won of Libelante	Relieved (다행이다)	Kim Dong-ryul	87
2nd song	Dancing Queen	Harimu	Toc Toc Toc (톡!톡!톡!)	Lee Hyori	-
Pair 2	Dionysus	Choi Nakta	Love, Maybe (사랑인가 봐)	MeloMance	32
Pair 2	Hermes	Hong Kyung-min	Love, Maybe (사랑인가 봐)	MeloMance	67
2nd song	Dionysus	Choi Nakta	The Song (그 노래)	John Park	-
Pair 3	Tea Bag	Kan Mi-youn of Baby V.O.X.	Four Seasons (사계)	Taeyeon	50
Pair 3	Teacup	Natty of KISS OF LIFE	Four Seasons (사계)	Taeyeon	49
2nd song	Teacup	Natty of KISS OF LIFE	Maybe It’s Not Our Fault (그건 아마 우리의 잘못이 아닐 거야)	Yerin Baek	-
Pair 4	Cabinet	Song Pyl-geun	Marriage Proposal (청혼)	Lee So-ra	23
Pair 4	Antique Mirror	Yangpa	Marriage Proposal (청혼)	Lee So-ra	76
2nd song	Cabinet	Song Pyl-geun	Amazing You (그대라는 사치)	Han Dong-geun	-

Episode 495

Episode 495 was broadcast on May 18, 2025.

Order	Stage Name	Real Name	Song	Original artist	Vote
Round 2
Pair 1	Balance King	Jin Won of Libelante	Sadness Guide (슬픔활용법)	Kim Bum-soo	29
Pair 1	Hermes	Hong Kyung-min	Already Sad Love (이미 슬픈 사랑)	ko	70
Pair 2	Tea Bag	Kan Mi-youn of Baby V.O.X.	I Believe	Lee Soo-young	9
Pair 2	Antique Mirror	Yangpa	Twenty Five, Twenty One (스물다섯, 스물하나)	Jaurim	90
Round 3
Finalists	Hermes	Hong Kyung-min	Blue Whale (흰수염고래)	YB	23
Finalists	Antique Mirror	Yangpa	The Lonely Bloom Stands Alone (시든 꽃에 물을 주듯)	HYNN	76
Final
Battle	Antique Mirror	Yangpa	Previous three songs were used as voting standard		52
Battle	Perfume Over Flowers	Jung Joon-il	For God’s Sake (제발)	Lee So-Ra	47

=== 246th Generation Mask King ===
- Contestants: Ma I-jin, Park Seul-gi, Baek A, Kwon Soon-kwan of (No Reply, Ryu Su-jeong of (Lovelyz), Yuk Jun-seo, Seo Do-young, Ahn Tae-gyu of (Dragon Pony)
Episode 496 - 497

Episode 496

Episode 496 was broadcast on May 25, 2025.

Order	Stage Name	Real Name	Song	Original artist	Vote
Round 1
Pair 1	White Grape Ade	Ma I-jin	Break Up With Her (그녀와의 이별)	Kim Hyun-jung	67
Pair 1	Pineapple Sherbet	Park Seul-gi	Break Up With Her (그녀와의 이별)	Kim Hyun-jung	32
2nd song	Pineapple Sherbet	Park Seoul-gi	In Order That Farewell Doesn’t Come (이별이 오지 못하게)	Page	-
Pair 2	Singing In The Rain	Baek A	I Got Lucky (운이 좋았지)	Kwon Jin-ah	34
Pair 2	Fly Me To The Moon	Kwon Soon-kwan of No Reply	I Got Lucky (운이 좋았지)	Kwon Jin-ah	65
2nd song	Singing In The Rain	Baek A	Between Love And Friendship (사랑과 우정사이)	Pinocchio	-
Pair 3	Field Day	Ryu Su-jeong of Lovelyz	Myeongdong Calling (명동콜링)	Crying Nut	74
Pair 3	I Work Out	Yuk Jun-seo	Myeongdong Calling (명동콜링)	Crying Nut	25
2nd song	I Work Out	Yuk Jun-Seo	A Beautiful Farewell (아름다운 이별)	Kim Gun-mo	-
Pair 4	My Heart Is Pounding Chicken	Seo Do-young	People Are More Beautiful Than Flowers (사람이 꽃보다 아름다워)	An Chi-hwan	9
Pair 4	I’ll Be Fine Dragon	Ahn Tae-gyu of Dragon Pony	People Are More Beautiful Than Flowers (사람이 꽃보다 아름다워)	An Chi-hwan	90
2nd song	My Heart Is Pounding Chicken	Seo Do-young	Trust in Me (이제 나만 믿어요)	Lim Young-woong	-

Episode 497

Episode 497 will be broadcast on June 1, 2025.

Order	Stage Name	Real Name	Song	Original artist	Vote
Round 2
Pair 1	White Grape Ade	Ma I-jin	Play it Cool (쿨~하게)	Maya	67
Pair 1	Fly Me To The Moon	Kwon Soon-kwan of No Reply	Every Moment of You (너의 모든 순간)	Sung Si-kyung	32
Pair 2	Field Day	Ryu Su-jeong of Lovelyz	Respect	Ahn Shin-ae	27
Pair 2	I’ll Be Fine Dragon	Ahn Tae-gyu of Dragon Pony	TOMBOY	Hyukoh	72
Round 3
Finalists	White Grape Ade	Ma I-jin	Sad Promise (슬픈 언약식)	Kim Jung-min	16
Finalists	I’ll Be Fine Dragon	Ahn Tae-gyu of Dragon Pony	For You (당신을 위하여)	The Cross	83
Final
Battle	I’ll Be Fine Dragon	Ahn Tae-gyu of Dragon Pony	Previous three songs were used as voting standard		46
Battle	Antique Mirror	Yangpa	Living in the Same Time (같은 시간 속의 너)	Naul	53

=== 247th Generation Mask King ===
- Contestants: Donghyeon of (KickFlip), Kil Gun, Shin Gong-hoon, An So-mi, Jeong Young-han, Jun Ha-young, Kim Jae-hee, Moon Ji-in
Episode 498 - 499

Episode 498

Episode 498 was broadcast on June 8, 2025.

Order	Stage Name	Real Name	Song	Original artist	Vote
Round 1
Pair 1	Polaroid	Donghyeon of KickFlip	A Letter For You (봄 내음보다 너를)	Kim Na-young	63
Pair 1	Film Camera	Kil Gun	A Letter For You (봄 내음보다 너를)	Kim Na-young	36
2nd song	Film Camera	Kil Gun	Scattered Days (흩어진 나날들)	Kang Susie	-
Pair 2	Hong Du-kkae	Shin Gong-Hoon	You Are The Only One (오직 하나뿐인 그대)	Shim Shin	63
Pair 2	Go Eun-ae	An So-mi	You Are The Only One (오직 하나뿐인 그대)	Shim Shin	36
2nd song	Go Eun-ae	An So-mi	My Only Love Gone Away (내 하나의 사랑은 가고)	Lim Hee-sook	-
Pair 3	Mangosteen	Jeong Young-han	Friend (친구여)	Cho PD ft. Insooni	5
Pair 3	Mango Bingsu	Jun Ha-young	Friend (친구여)	Cho PD ft. Insooni	94
2nd song	Mangosteen	Jeong Young-han	See Through (씨쓰루)	Primary feat. Gaeko and Zion.T	-
Pair 4	From Rags To Riches	Kim Jae-hee	Seoshi (서시)	Shin Sung-woo	70
Pair 4	Life As Usual	Moon Ji-in	Seoshi (서시)	Shin Sung-woo	29
2nd song	Life As Usual	Moon Ji-in	It’s Love (사랑인걸)	MOSE	-

Episode 499

Episode 499 was broadcast on June 15, 2025.

Order	Stage Name	Real Name	Song	Original artist	Vote
Round 2
Pair 1	Polaroid	Donghyeon of KickFlip	Love Has Left Again (또 한번 사랑은 가고)	Lee Ki-chan	18
Pair 1	Hong Du-kkae	Shin Gong-hoon	Forever (영원)	SKY	81
Pair 2	Mango Bingsu	Jun Ha-young	Things I Cant Say (내가 할 수 없는 말)	Jung Key ft. Navi	74
Pair 2	From Rags To Riches	Kim Jae-hee	After Love (사랑한 후에)	Jeon In-kwon	25
Round 3
Finalists	Hong Du-kkae	Shin Gong-hoon	Father (아버지)	Insooni	38
Finalists	Mango Bingsu	Jun Ha-young	For Ever and Ever (영원히 영원히)	Jaurim	61
Final
Battle	Mango Bingsu	Jun Ha-young	Previous three songs were used as voting standard		35
Battle	Antique Mirror	Yangpa	Grown Ups (어른)	Sondia	64

=== 10th Anniversary Special ===
For episodes 500-501, previous contestants are invited back to the show to perform solo or as a duo. While most are previous Masked Kings, there are also iconic contestants who have paved the way for the 10th Anniversary of The King of Masked Singer to become a reality. These two episodes are not competitive so there is no voting involved but follow an order as if it were a concert.

Episode 500 - 501

Episode 500

Episode 500 was broadcast on June 22, 2025.

Order	Stage Name	Real Name	Song	Original artist
Day 1 Performances
1	Self-Luminous Mosaic	Solji of EXID	Love On Top	Beyoncé
2	Lupin The Phantom Thief	Lee Hong-gi of F.T. Island	Addicted Love (중독된 사랑)	Cho Jang-hyuk
3	A Greasy Butterfly	Kim Feel	If I Love Again (다시 사랑한다면)	Do Won-kyoung
4	Queen Of Hearts & First Place Trophy	Park Ki-young & Yoo Hwe-seung of N.Flying	Invitation to Me (나에게로의 초대)	Jung Kyoung-hwa
4	Queen Of Hearts & First Place Trophy	Park Ki-young & Yoo Hwe-seung of N.Flying	Heavenly Fate (천상연)	CAN
5	Romantic The Dark Knight	Roy Kim	I Miss You More and More (그리움만 쌓이네)	Yeojin
6	Chestnut Burr & Hearty School Lunch	Kim Tae-yeon & Hwang Min-ho	Amor Fati (아모르 파티)	Kim Yon-ja
7	9 Songs, Mood Maker	Sohyang	Hug Me (안아줘)	Jung Joon-il
8	CBR Cleopatra	Kim Yeon-woo	After This Night (이 밤이 지나면)	Yim Jae-beom

Episode 501

Episode 501 was broadcast on June 29, 2025.

Order	Stage Name	Real Name	Song	Original artist
Day 2 Performances
1	Perfume Over Flowers	Jung Joon-il	Thanks (감사)	Kim Dong-ryul
2	Perfume Over Flowers	Yoon Sang & Jung Joon-il	The Shadow of Parting (이별의 그늘)	Yoon Sang
3	Chow Yun-fat	Kang Seung-yoon of WINNER	Twenty Five, Twenty One (스물다섯, 스물하나)	Jaurim
4	Trashy Student Council Leader & Fly High Superstar	Vata of WDBZ & Eunhyuk of Super Junior	Drowning	WOODZ
4	Trashy Student Council Leader & Fly High Superstar	Vata of WDBZ & Eunhyuk of Super Junior	like JENNIE	Jennie
5	Older Brother Is A Street Singer	Baek Hyeong-hun of HPresso	Superstar	Jesus Christ Superstar OST
6		Jang Minho	Play the Music (풍악을 울려라)	Jang Minho
7		Lena Park	I’ll Write to You (편지할게요)	Lena Park
7		Lena Park	In a Dream (몽중인)	Lena Park
8	Top Class Secret Agent & The Highs And Lows Also Count As Rock	Kim Jong-seo, Yun Min of TOUCHED & Shin Daechul of Sinawe	Turn Up the Radio (크게 라디오를 켜고)	Sinawe
9	Top Class Secret Agent	Kim Jong-seo & Shin Daechul of Sinawe	I Will Fly Away Like a Bird (새가 되어거리)	Sinawe

=== 248th Generation Mask King ===
- Contestants: Migyo, Hyeonbin of (NOWZ), Lim Ji-soo, Jung Seul, Oh Jeong-tae, Park Gwang-hyun, Hyun Young, Bak Chang-geun
Episode 502 - 503

Episode 502

Episode 502 was broadcast on July 6, 2025.

Order	Stage Name	Real Name	Song	Original artist	Vote
Round 1
Pair 1	Pouty	Migyo	Dream Of You (꿈속에 너)	H:CODE ft. Jeon Sang-keun	81
Pair 1	Smirky	Hyeonbin of NOWZ	Dream Of You (꿈속에 너)	H:CODE ft. Jeon Sang-keun	18
2nd song	Smirky	Hyeonbin of NOWZ	Something's Wrong (뭔가 잘못됐어)	Kwon Jin-ah	-
Pair 2	Birthday Card	Lim Ji-soo	Moon of Seoul (서울의 달)	Kim Gun-mo	72
Pair 2	Tarot Card	Jung Seul	Moon of Seoul (서울의 달)	Kim Gun-mo	27
2nd song	Tarot Card	Jung Seul	I Love You (난 널 사랑해)	Shin Hyo-bum	-
Pair 3	Korean Cold Noodles	Oh Jeong-tae	Pitiful (찐이야)	Young Tak	9
Pair 3	Spicy Buckwheat Noodles	Park Gwang-hyun	Pitiful (찐이야)	Young Tak	90
2nd song	Korean Cold Noodles	Oh Jeong-tae	The Woman in the Rain (빗속의 여인)	Shin Joong-hyun	-
Pair 4	Bus Attendant	Hyun Young	Gypsy Woman (집시여인)	Lee Chi-hyun	11
Pair 4	Music Salon DJ	Bak Chang-geun	Gypsy Woman (집시여인)	Lee Chi-hyun	88
2nd song	Bus Attendant	Hyun Young	Sweet Dream	Jang Na-ra	-

Episode 503

Episode 503 was broadcast on July 13, 2025.

Order	Stage Name	Real Name	Song	Original artist	Vote
Round 2
Pair 1	Pouty	Migyo	Beautiful Days (아름다운 날들)	Jang Hye-jin	25
Pair 1	Birthday Card	Lim Ji-soo	Don’t Go Today (오늘은 가지마)	Ben	74
Pair 2	Spicy Buckwheat Noodles	Park Gwang-hyun	My Own Grief (나만의 슬픔)	Kim Don-gyoo	21
Pair 2	Music Salon DJ	Bak Chang-geun	In My Dream (꿈에)	Cho Deok-bae	78
Round 3
Finalists	Birthday Card	Lim Ji-soo	When Spring Comes (꽃피는 봄이 오면)	BMK	25
Finalists	Music Salon DJ	Bak Chang-geun	I Don’t Know Now (지금은 알 수 없어)	Kim Jong-seo	74
Final
Battle	Music Salon DJ	Bak Chang-geun	Previous three songs were used as voting standard		32
Battle	Antique Mirror	Yangpa	Never Ending Story	Boohwal	67

=== 249th Generation Mask King ===
- Contestants: Jung Seo-joo, Doha of (ARrC), Zo Hyung-gyun of (Edel Reinklang), Mina, ELLY of (EXID), Choi Un-yul of (UmYull), Lee Hyo-jung, Kim Ki-tae
Episode 504 - 505

Episode 504

Episode 504 was broadcast on July 20, 2025.

Order	Stage Name	Real Name	Song	Original artist	Vote
Round 1
Pair 1	Slushie	Jung Seo-joo	I Believe	Shin Seung-hun	87
Pair 1	Crush	Doha of ARrC	I Believe	Shin Seung-hun	12
2nd song	Crush	Doha of ARrC	Polaroid Love	ENHYPEN	-
Pair 2	Moka Pot	Zo Hyung-gyun of Edel Reinklang	All For You	Cool	84
Pair 2	Toaster	Mina	All For You	Cool	15
2nd song	Toaster	Mina	Waiting (기다리다)	Younha	-
Pair 3	Let’s Catch Mice	ELLY of EXID	A Doll’s Dream (인형의 꿈)	Weather Cast	29
Pair 3	Eeny Meeny Miny Moe	Choi Un-yul of UmYull	A Doll’s Dream (인형의 꿈)	Weather Cast	70
2nd song	Let’s Catch Mice	ELLY of EXID	The Song That I Send You (너에게 보내는 노래)	Roller Coaster	-
Pair 4	Midday Music Fountain	Lee Hyo-jung	That Is You (그건 너)	Lee Jang-hee	17
Pair 4	Mid-Summer Night Cinema	Kim Ki-tae	That Is You (그건 너)	Lee Jang-hee	82
2nd song	Midday Music Fountain	Lee Hyo-jung	You Outside The Door (문 밖에 있는 그대)	Park Kang-seong	-

Episode 505

Episode 505 was broadcast on July 27, 2025.

Order	Stage Name	Real Name	Song	Original artist	Vote
Round 2
Pair 1	Slushie	Jung Seo-joo	If (만약에)	Taeyeon	23
Pair 1	Moka Pot	Zo Hyung-gyun of Edel Reinklang	I Didn’t Know Yet (그땐 미쳐 알지 몰랐지)	Lee Juck	76
Pair 2	Eeny Meeny Miny Moe	Choi Un-yul of UmYull	Atlantis Princess (아틀란티스 소녀)	BoA	15
Pair 2	Mid-Summer Night Cinema	Kim Ki-Tae	Resignation (체념)	Big Mama	84
Round 3
Finalists	Moka Pot	Zo Hyung-gyun of Edel Reinklang	Alcohol (술이야)	Vibe	21
Finalists	Mid-Summer Night Cinema	Kim Ki-Tae	Writing a Letter On a Cloudy Autumn Sky (흐린 가을 하늘에 편지를 써)	Zoo	78
Final
Battle	Mid-Summer Night Cinema	Kim Ki-tae	Previous three songs were used as voting standard		43
Battle	Antique Mirror	Yangpa	Run With Me (도망가자)	Sunwoo Jung-a	56

=== 250th Generation Mask King ===
- Contestants: SAAY, Minami of (RESCENE), Yang Ji-eun, Yoon Hyong-bin, Jeon Min-gi, Chae Bo-hun of (THEVANE), Kang Eun-bi, Lee Byung-joon
Episode 506 - 507

Episode 506

Episode 506 was broadcast on August 3, 2025.

Order	Stage Name	Real Name	Song	Original artist	Vote
Round 1
Pair 1	Phone Decorating	SAAY	I Will Go to You Like the First Snow (첫눈처럼 너에게 가겠다)	Ailee	62
Pair 1	Backpack Decorating	Minami of RESCENE	I Will Go to You Like the First Snow (첫눈처럼 너에게 가겠다)	Ailee	37
2nd song	Backpack Decorating	Minami of RESCENE	Password 486 (비밀번호 486)	Younha	-
Pair 2	Howdy Shrimp	Yang Ji-eun	Two People (두 사람)	Sung Si-kyung	88
Pair 2	LOL Clam	Yoon Hyong-bin	Two People (두 사람)	Sung Si-kyung	11
2nd song	LOL Clam	Yoon Hyong-bin	Walk On (걷고, 걷고)	Deulgukhwa	-
Pair 3	Faithful Magpies	Jeon Min-gi	Under the Sky (하늘 아래서)	Kim Min-jong	14
Pair 3	Demon-Vanquishing Tiger	Chae Bo-hun of THEVANE	Under the Sky (하늘 아래서)	Kim Min-jong	85
2nd song	Faithful Magpies	Jeon Min-gi	A Friend Like a Rest (휴식같은 친구)	Kim Min-woo	-
Pair 4	High Tone	Kang Eun-bi	About Romance (낭만에 대하여)	Choi Baek-ho	13
Pair 4	Baritone	Lee Byung-Joon	About Romance (낭만에 대하여)	Choi Baek-ho	86
2nd song	High Tone	Kang Eun-bi	Dear J (J에게)	Lee Sun-hee	-

Episode 507

Episode 507 was broadcast on August 10, 2025.

Order	Stage Name	Real Name	Song	Original artist	Vote
Round 2
Pair 1	Phone Decorating	SAAY	Can’t We (안 되나요)	Wheesung	32
Pair 1	Howdy Shrimp	Yang Ji-eun	Rain Drops (빗물)	Che Un-ok	67
Pair 2	Demon-Vanquishing Tiger	Chae Bo-hun of THEVANE	From Mark	Ha Dong-kyun	69
Pair 2	Baritone	Lee Byung-joon	Love, on its Solitutde (사랑 그 쓸쓸함에 대하여)	Yang Hee-eun	30
Round 3
Finalists	Howdy Shrimp	Yang Ji-eun	Changgwi (창귀)	Ahn Ye-eun	33
Finalists	Demon-Vanquishing Tiger	Chae Bo-hun of THEVANE	Lay Silk on my Heart (내 마음에 주단을 깔고)	Sanulrim	66
Final
Battle	Demon-Vanquishing Tiger	Chae Bo-hun of THEVANE	Previous three songs were used as voting standard		52
Battle	Antique Mirror	Yangpa	I AM	IVE	47

=== 251st Generation Mask King ===
- Contestants: Kamden of (AMPERS&ONE), MRCH, Go Woo-ri, Lee Choong-joo of (Edel Reinklang), Oh Seung-yoon, Oh Ji-yul, Lee Se-joon of (Yurisangja), Chun Myung-hoon of (NRG)
Episode 508 - 509

Episode 508

Episode 508 was broadcast on August 17, 2025.

Order	Stage Name	Real Name	Song	Original artist	Vote
Round 1
Pair 1	Summer Vacation	Kamden of AMPERS&ONE	The Flowerpot (화분)	Loveholics	56
Pair 1	Holiday	MRCH	The Flowerpot (화분)	Loveholics	43
2nd song	Holiday	MRCH	Rain	Taeyeon	-
Pair 2	Summer Wind	Go Woo-ri	Instinctively (본능적으로)	Yoon Jong-shin ft. Swings	16
Pair 2	Summer Scent	Lee Choong-joo of Edel Reinklang	Instinctively (본능적으로)	Yoon Jong-shin ft. Swings	83
2nd song	Summer Wind	Go Woo-ri	Lady in the Rainy Night (여우야)	The Classic	-
Pair 3	Mole	Oh Seung-yoon	Where the Wind Rises (바람이 불어오는 곳)	Kim Kwang-seok	77
Pair 3	I’m Scary!	Oh Ji-yul	Where the Wind Rises (바람이 불어오는 곳)	Kim Kwang-seok	22
2nd song	I’m Scary!	Oh Ji-yul	Bam Yang Gang (밤양갱)	BIBI	-
Pair 4	Forest Explorer	Lee Se-joon of Yurisangja	Nothing Better	Brown Eyed Soul	79
Pair 4	Ocean Adventurer	Chun Myung-hoon of NRG	Nothing Better	Brown Eyed Soul	20
2nd song	Ocean Adventurer	Chun Myung-hoon of NRG	As I Told You (말하자면)	Kim Sung-jae	-

Episode 509

Episode 509 was broadcast on August 24, 2025.

Order	Stage Name	Real Name	Song	Original artist	Vote
Round 2
Pair 1	Summer Vacation	Kamden of AMPERS&ONE	BAD BOY	BIGBANG	12
Pair 1	Summer Scent	Lee Choong-joo of Edel Reinklang	Snail (달팽이)	Panic	87
Pair 2	Mole	Oh Seung-yoon	Magic Lily (상사화)	Nam Jin	35
Pair 2	Forest Explorer	Lee Se-joon of Yurisangja	Only Then (그때 헤어지면 돼)	Roy Kim	64
Round 3
Finalists	Summer Scent	Lee Choong-joo of Edel Reinklang	Love is Like Snow (사랑은 눈꽃처럼)	XIA	23
Finalists	Forest Explorer	Lee Se-joon of Yurisangja	Love Wins All	IU	76
Final
Battle	Forest Explorer	Lee Se-joon of Yurisangja	Previous three songs were used as voting standard		40
Battle	Demon-Vanquishing Tiger	Chae Bo-hun of THEVANE	LION	i-dle	59

=== 252nd Generation Mask King ===
- Contestants: Bae Woo-hee, SINCE, Lee So-eun, Minzunki, Jaehee of (NCT WISH), Kwak Beom, Ha Jun, Yuria
Episode 510 - 511

Episode 510

Episode 510 was broadcast on August 31, 2025.

Order	Stage Name	Real Name	Song	Original artist	Vote
Round 1
Pair 1	Can I Please Be The Masked King Plum	Bae Woo-hee	Sometimes (가끔)	Crush	45
Pair 1	No Choice But To Become The Masked King Watermelon	SINCE	Sometimes (가끔)	Crush	54
2nd song	Can I Please Be The Masked King Plum	Bae Woo-hee	17171771	Jaurim	-
Pair 2	Campus In Full Bloom	Minzunki	If You Come Back (그대 돌아온다면)	Gummy	22
Pair 2	Golden Ratio Compass	Lee So-eun	If You Come Back (그대 돌아온다면)	Gummy	77
2nd song	Campus In Full Bloom	Minzunki	First Impression (첫인상)	Kim Gun-mo	-
Pair 3	Milky Way In A Clear Blue Sky	Jaehee of NCT WISH	Welcome to the Show	DAY6	89
Pair 3	Twinkle Twinkle Little Star	Kwak Beom	Welcome to the Show	DAY6	10
2nd song	Twinkle Twinkle Little Star	Kwak Beom	Our Dream (우리의 꿈)	Koyote	-
Pair 4	Melody-Flowing Sheet Music	Ha Jun	Because I Love You (사랑하기 때문에)	Yoo Jae-ha	15
Pair 4	Soul-Resonating Piano	Yuria	Because I Love You (사랑하기 때문에)	Yoo Jae-ha	84
2nd song	Melody-Flowing Sheet Music	Ha Jun	Stormy Voyage (질풍가도)	Yu Jung-seok	-

Episode 511

Episode 511 was broadcast on September 7, 2025.

Order	Stage Name	Real Name	Song	Original artist	Vote
Round 2
Pair 1	No Choice But To Become The Masked King Watermelon	SINCE	1,2,3,4	Lee Hi	31
Pair 1	Golden Ratio Compass	Lee So-eun	Desire and Hope (원하고 원망하죠)	As One	68
Pair 2	Milky Way In A Clear Blue Sky	Jaehee of NCT WISH	Forbidden Love (금지된 사랑)	Kim Kyung-ho	10
Pair 2	Soul-Resonating Piano	Yuria	Love, Never Fade (사랑, 결코 시들지 않는..)	Seomoon Tak	89
Round 3
Finalists	Golden Ratio Compass	Lee So-eun	Beautiful as Always (여전히 아름다운지)	Toy	13
Finalists	Soul-Resonating Piano	Yuria	Wild Flower (야생화)	Park Hyo-shin	86
Final
Battle	Soul-Resonating Piano	Yuria	Previous three songs were used as voting standard		60
Battle	Demon-Vanquishing Tiger	Chae Bo-hun of THEVANE	My Love by my Side (내 사랑 내 곁에)	Kim Hyun-sik	39

=== 253rd Generation Mask King ===
- Contestants: Kang Seok-hwa of (WEi), Dohee of (SAY MY NAME), Kim Kyung-min, Cheon Dan-bi, siso, Kang Se-jung, BBAEKGA of (Koyote), Shin Seung-tae
Episode 512 - 513

Episode 512

Episode 512 was broadcast on September 21, 2025, skipping a week.

Order	Stage Name	Real Name	Song	Original artist	Vote
Round 1
Pair 1	Cream-Based Pasta	Kang Seok-hwa of WEi	Can’t Love You Anymore (사랑이 잘)	IU	20
Pair 1	Tomato-Based Pasta	Dohee of SAY MY NAME	Can’t Love You Anymore (사랑이 잘)	IU	79
2nd song	Cream-Based Pasta	Kang Seok-ha of WEi	SOFA	Crush	-
Pair 2	Yippee Eheradiya	Kim Kyung-min	I Have a Lover (애인 있어요)	Lee Eun-mi	12
Pair 2	Hurray Colombia	Cheon Dan-bi	I Have a Lover (애인 있어요)	Lee Eun-mi	87
2nd song	Yippee Eheradiya	Kim Kyung-min	For You (너를 위해)	Yim Jae-beom	-
Pair 3	Red Ruby	siso	Farewell For Myself (날 위한 이별)	Kim Hye-rim	87
Pair 3	Blue Sapphire	Kang Se-jung	Farewell For Myself (날 위한 이별)	Kim Hye-rim	12
2nd song	Blue Sapphire	Kang Se-jung	I GO	Rumble Fish	-
Pair 4	Masked King Photo Booth	BBAEKGA of Koyote	Running on the Sky (하늘을 달리다)	Lee Juck	10
Pair 4	Old Photo Studio	Shin Seung-tae	Running on the Sky (하늘을 달리다)	Lee Juck	89
2nd song	Masked King Photo Booth	BBAEKGA of Koyote	Confession (고해성사)	Hareem	-

Episode 513

Episode 513 was broadcast on October 5, 2025, skipping a week.

Order	Stage Name	Real Name	Song	Original artist	Vote
Round 2
Pair 1	Tomato-Based Pasta	Dohee of SAY MY NAME	DOWNPOUR (소나기)	I.O.I	22
Pair 1	Hurray Colombia	Cheon Dan-bi	Doll (인형)	Lee Ji-hoon	77
Pair 2	Red Ruby	siso	Four Times Around the Sun (지구가 태양을 네번)	NELL	20
Pair 2	Old Photo Studio	Shin Seung-tae	I Tried Everything But (별 짓 다해봤는데)	ALi	79
Round 3
Finalists	Hurray Colombia	Cheon Dan-bi	I Hate You (미워요)	Jungin	29
Finalists	Old Photo Studio	Shin Seung-tae	Nocturne (야상곡)	Kim Yuna	70
Final
Battle	Old Photo Studio	Shin Seung-tae	Previous three songs were used as voting standard		20
Battle	Soul-Resonating Piano	Yuria	Sound (소리)	Big Mama	79

=== 254th Generation Mask King ===
- Contestants: Kim Su-young, Nam Doh-hyeong, Lee Seung-yoon, Kim So-yu, Kevin of (U-Kiss), Han Groo, Park Yong-taik, TBA
Episode 514 - 515

Episode 514

Episode 514 was broadcast on October 12, 2025.

Order	Stage Name	Real Name	Song	Original artist	Vote
Special	Mrs. Rose	Kim Yon-ja	Evergreen Tree (상록수)	Yang Hee-eun	-
Special	Mrs. Rose	Kim Yon-ja	Ssuk Duk Koong (쑥덕쿵)	Kim Yon-ja	-
Round 1
Pair 1	Lucky Draw board	Kim Su-young	Confession is Not Flashy (화려하지 않은 고백)	Lee Seung-hwan	74
Pair 1	Chuseok Nagging Menu	Nam Doh-hyeong	Confession is Not Flashy (화려하지 않은 고백)	Lee Seung-hwan	25
2nd song	Chuseok Nagging Menu	Nam Doh-hyeong	Rain	Lee Juck	-
Pair 2	Chestnut to See you	Lee Seung-yoon	Gimbap (김밥)	The Jadu	14
Pair 2	Thank Potato Much	Kim So-yu	Gimbap (김밥)	The Jadu	85
2nd song	Chestnut to See you	Lee Seung-yoon	I’ll Get Over You (잊을게)	YB	-
Pair 3	Shining Bright Moon	Kevin of U-Kiss	Gather my Tears (눈물 모아)	Seo Ji-won	77
Pair 3	Ganggangsullae	Han Groo	Gather my Tears (눈물 모아)	Seo Ji-won	22
2nd song	Ganggangsullae	Han Groo	I Think I	Byul	-
Pair 4	Nosey Sheriff	Park Yong-taik	Love Alone (혼자만의 사랑)	Kim Gun-mo	13
Pair 4	Perfect Aim Marksman	TBA	Love Alone (혼자만의 사랑)	Kim Gun-mo	86
2nd song	Nosey Sheriff	Park Yong-taik	If we Ever Meet Again (다시 만날 수 있을까)	Lim Young-woong	-

Episode 515

Episode 515 was broadcast on October 19, 2025.

Order	Stage Name	Real Name	Song	Original artist	Vote
Round 2
Pair 1	Lucky Draw board	Kim Su-young	I'm not Alone (혼자가 아닌 나)	Seo Young Eun	22
Pair 1	Thank Potato Much	Kim So-yu	365 Days (365일)	ALi	77
Pair 2	Shining Bright Moon	Kevin of U-Kiss	Way Back Home	Shaun	10
Pair 2	Perfect Aim Marksman	TBA	Crazy (미치고 싶다)	Han Dong Geun	89
Round 3
Finalists	Thank Potato Much	Kim So-yu	If I Leave (나 가거든)	Jo Sumi	14
Finalists	Perfect Aim Marksman	TBA	Hug me (안아줘)	Jeong Joon Il	85
Final
Battle	Perfect Aim Marksman	TBA	Previous three songs were used as voting standard		50
Battle	Soul-Resonating Piano	Yuria	Snake (뱀)	Jaurim	49

=== 255th Generation Mask King ===
- Contestants: Jung Dae-hyun of (B.A.P), Kisum, Jeon Gun-ho, Kim Mi-ryeong (Auntie Omakase), Ha Ji-young, Lee Su-yeon, Lee Jung-hyun, Jung You-kyung
Episode 516 - 517

Episode 516

Episode 516 was broadcast on October 26, 2025.

Order	Stage Name	Real Name	Song	Original artist	Vote
Special	Prince From the Star	Shin Seung Hun	You to Me Again (그때 내게 다시)	Byun Jin-sub	-
Special	Prince From the Star	Shin Seung Hun	I Believe	Shin Seung Hun	-
Special	Prince From the Star	Shin Seung Hun	She Was	Shin Seung Hun	-
Special	Prince From the Star	Shin Seung Hun	Gravity of You (너라는 중력)	Shin Seung Hun	-
Round 1
Pair 1	Fig Cake	Jung Dae-hyun of BAP	Happy Me (행복한 나를)	Eco	83
Pair 1	Matcha Latte	Kisum (Rapper)	Happy Me (행복한 나를)	Eco	16
2nd song	Matcha Latte	Kisum (Rapper)	Eyes, Nose, Lips (눈,코,입)	Taeyang	-
Pair 2	Autumn Post Office	Jeon Gun Ho	What I All Care is Love (사랑밖엔 난 몰라)	Sim Soo Bong	89
Pair 2	Autumn Morning	Kim Mi-ryeong (Auntie Omakase)	What I All Care is Love (사랑밖엔 난 몰라)	Sim Soo Bong	10
2nd song	Autumn Morning	Kim Mi-ryeong (Auntie Omakase)	As Wearing Heavy Lipstick (닙스팈 짙게 빠르고)	Lim Ju Ri	-
Pair 3	Chirpy Sparrow	Ha Ji-young	Love Sick (사랑앓이)	FTIsland	11
Pair 3	Quacky Duck	Lee Su Yeon	Love Sick (사랑앓이)	FTIsland	88
2nd song	Chirpy Sparrow	Ha Ji-young	When We Disco (with Sunmi)	J.Y. Park	-
Pair 4	Soft Boy	Lee Jung-hyun	Delete (삭제)	Lee Seunggi	11
Pair 4	Tough Girl	Jung You-kyung	Delete (삭제)	Lee Seunggi	88
2nd song	Soft Boy	Lee Jung-hyun	Bravo, My Life!	SSaW	-

Episode 517

Episode 517 was broadcast on November 02, 2025.

Order	Stage Name	Real Name	Song	Original artist	Vote
Round 2
Pair 1	Fig Cake	Jung Dae-hyun of BAP	Me After You (너를 만나)	Paul Kim	10
Pair 1	Autumn Post Office	Jeon Gun Ho	If You Would Raise Me Up (그대나를일으켜주면)	Car, the Garden	89
Pair 2	Quacky Duck	Lee Su Yeon	U&I	Ailee	59
Pair 2	Tough Girl	Jung You-kyung	My heart Beats (가슴이 뛴다)	Lee Eun-mi	40
Round 3
Finalists	Autumn Post Office	Jeon Gun Ho	Missing You (그립고 그립고 그립다)	K.Will	77
Finalists	Quacky Duck	Lee Su Yeon	You & I (너랑 나)	IU	22
Final
Battle	Autumn Post Office	Jeon Gun Ho	Previous three songs were used as voting standard		19
Battle	Perfect Aim Marksman	TBA	Till the end of time (기다린 만큼, 더)	The Black Skirts	80

=== 256th Generation Mask King ===
- Contestants: Yang Hye-seung, Park Hee-jin, Yuma of (&Team), Park Sae-byul, Jung Seung-won (Libelante),Layone, Kim Sung-soo of Cool, Theray.
Episode 518 - 519

Episode 518

Episode 518 was broadcast on November 9, 2025.

Order	Stage Name	Real Name	Song	Original artist	Vote
Round 1
Pair 1	Fall Foliage Trip	Yang Hye-seung	Only Longing Grows (그리움만 쌓이네)	Yeo Jin	74
Pair 1	School Trip	Park Hee-jin	Only Longing Grows (그리움만 쌓이네)	Yeo Jin	25
2nd song	School Trip	Park Hee-jin	Spring day Goes (봄날은 간다)	Kim Yun A	-
Pair 2	Red Bean Porridge	Yuma of &Team	Illusion (환상)	Park Ji-yoon	32
Pair 2	Shelled Unshelled Bean Pod	Park Sae-byul	Illusion (환상)	Park Ji-yoon	67
2nd song	Red Bean Porridge	Yuma of &Team	Wind	FTIsland	-
Pair 3	Child's Disciplined Life	Jung Seung-won of Libelante	Heartsore Story (가슴 시린 이야기)	Wheesung (ft Junhyung of Beast)	73
Pair 3	Office Worker's life of Exploration	Layone	Heartsore Story (가슴 시린 이야기)	Wheesung (ft Junhyung of Beast)	26
2nd song	Office Worker's life of Exploration	Layone	One Candle (촛불하나)	g.o.d	-
Pair 4	Will Do or Not!	Kim Seong-su of Cool	As Time Goes By (세월이 가면)	Choi Ho-sub	13
Pair 4	Cry or Not!	Theray	As Time Goes By (세월이 가면)	Choi Ho-sub	86
2nd song	Will Do or Not!	Kim Seong-su of Cool	I'm a Firefly (나는 반딧불)	Lunch	-

Episode 519

Episode 519 was broadcast on November 23, 2025, skipping a week (due to the K-Baseball Series event,baseball match between Korea and Japan).

Order	Stage Name	Real Name	Song	Original artist	Vote
Round 2
Pair 1	Fall Foliage Trip	Yang Hye-seung	Lost (상실)	Park Sang-min	22
Pair 1	Shelled Unshelled Bean Pod	Park Sae-byul	Sad Fate (슬픈인연)	Na-mi	77
Pair 2	Child's Disciplined Life	Jung Seung-won of Libelante	Fall in Fall (가을 타나 봐)	Vibe	41
Pair 2	Cry or Not!	Theray	As Days Go by (하루 하루 지나가면)	Jung Yeon-joon	58
Round 3
Finalists	Shelled Unshelled Bean Pod	TBA	You in my arms (그대 내 품에)	Yoo Jae-ha	50
Finalists	Cry or Not!	Theray	Thanks (감사)	Kim Dong-ryul	49
Final
Battle	Shelled Unshelled Bean Pod	Park Sae-byul	Previous three songs were used as voting standard		28
Battle	Perfect Aim Marksman	TBA	Argument (다툼)	Lee Juck	71

=== 257th Generation Mask King ===
- Contestants: Crucial Star, Kim Si-yoon (AJ of U-kiss), Kei of (Lovelyz), Yihyun of (Baby Dont Cry), Na Ha-na, Son Heon-su, Kang Eun-tak, Son Bin-ah
Episode 520 - 521

Episode 520

Episode 520 was broadcast on November 30, 2025.

Order	Stage Name	Real Name	Song	Original artist	Vote
Round 1
Pair 1	Racing Instinct Car Racer	Crucial Star	Lie Lie Lie (거짓말 거짓말 거짓말)	Lee Juck	22
Pair 1	Sky High Pilot	Kim Si-yoon	Lie Lie Lie (거짓말 거짓말 거짓말)	Lee Juck	77
2nd song	Racing Instinct Car Racer	Crucial Star	If you come into my heart (그대 내 맘에 들어 오면은)	Cho Deok-Bae	-
Pair 2	Whole Mozzarella Hot Dog	Kei of Lovelyz	Please (부디)	Lucia,Epitone Project	84
Pair 2	Singing Hamburtle	Yihyun of Baby DON'T cry	Please (부디)	Lucia,Epitone Project	15
2nd song	Singing Hamburtle	Yihyun of Baby DON'T cry	December 32 Days (12월 32일)	Byul	-
Pair 3	Pillow Fight	Na Ha-na	Thorn Tree (가시나무)	Towner and Town chief	86
Pair 3	Staring Contest	Son Heon-su	Thorn Tree (가시나무)	Towner and Town chief	13
2nd song	Staring Contest	Son Heon-su	Footsteps (발걸음)	Emerald Castle	-
Pair 4	Truthful Hat	Kang Eun-tak	Rain and You (비와 당신)	Park Joong-hoon	12
Pair 4	Magical Potion	Son Bin-ah	Rain and You (비와 당신)	Park Joong-hoon	87
2nd song	Truthful Hat	Kang Eun-tak	Love Always Runs Away (사랑은 늘 도망가)	Lee Moon-sae	-

Episode 521

Episode 521 was broadcast on December 7, 2025.

Order	Stage Name	Real Name	Song	Original artist	Vote
Round 2
Pair 1	Sky High Pilot	Kim Si-yoon	Good Night Good Dream (좋은 밤 좋은 꿈)	Nerd Connection	11
Pair 1	Whole Mozzarella Hot Dog	Kei of Lovelyz	Hurt (아파 아이야)	Yangpa	88
Pair 2	Pillow Fight	Na Ha-na	Harmony (하모니)	JeA,Lee Young-hyun (Big Mama)	38
Pair 2	Magical Potion	Son Bin-ah	Jasmine (말리꽃)	Lee Seung-chul	61
Round 3
Finalists	Whole Mozzarella Hot Dog	Kei of Lovelyz	Higher (featuring Yiruma)	Ailee	59
Finalists	Magical Potion	Son Bin-ah	Please, Please (제발)	Deulgukhwa	40
Final
Battle	Whole Mozzarella Hot Dog	Kei of Lovelyz	Previous three songs were used as voting standard		35
Battle	Perfect Aim Marksman	TBA	Home	Roy Kim	64

=== 258th Generation Mask King ===
- Contestants: Lee Sang-mi, Jang Han-eum, Lee Soo-min, Nine9 (Dear Cloud), Anh Suzie, Heo Seong-beom, Jang Jane, Heo Young-saeng (SS501)
Episode 522 - 523

Episode 522

Episode 522 was broadcast on December 14, 2025.

Order	Stage Name	Real Name	Song	Original artist	Vote
Round 1
Pair 1	Pierrot Smiles at Us	Lee Sang-mi	The Western Sky (서쪽 하늘)	Lee Seung-chul	64
Pair 1	Am I Smiling, Circus	Jang Han-eum	The Western Sky (서쪽 하늘)	Lee Seung-chul	35
2nd song	Am I Smiling, Circus	Jang Han-eum	The Painted on the Moonlight (달빛에 그려지는)	Miyeon (i-dle)	-
Pair 2	Christmas Latte	Lee Soo-min	You to Me Again (그대 내게 다시)	byun Jin-sub	18
Pair 2	Snowman Cake	Nine9 (Dear Cloud)	You to Me Again (그대 내게 다시)	byun Jin-sub	81
2nd song	Christmas Latte	Lee Soo-min	You Said it Easily (넌 쉽게 말했지만)	Yoon Sang	-
Pair 3	Sprint Treadmill	Anh Suzie	I Loved Even That Pain (그 아픔까지 사랑한거야)	Jo Jeong-hyeon	60
Pair 3	Run, Runner	Heo Seong-beom	I Loved Even That Pain (그 아픔까지 사랑한거야)	Jo Jeong-hyeon	39
2nd song	Run, Runner	Heo Seong-beom	If It was me (나였으면)	Na Yoon-kwon	-
Pair 4	I Lived In The Mountains Mountain Echo	Jang Jane	Letter (편지)	Kim Kwang-jin	20
Pair 4	The Hawk Flies Up Falcon	Heo Young-saeng (SS501)	Letter (편지)	Kim Kwang-jin	79
2nd song	Mountain Echo	Jang Jane	The First Impression (Kim Kwang-jin Ver. (처음 느낌 그대로)	Lee So-ra	-

Episode 523

Episode 523 was broadcast on December 21, 2025.

Order	Stage Name	Real Name	Song	Original artist	Vote
Round 2
Pair 1	Pierrot Smiles at Us	Lee Sang-mi	Musical (뮤지컬)	Im Sang-a	18
Pair 1	Snowman Cake	Nine9 (Dear Cloud)	Music (featuring Lee Chan-hyuk)	Big Naughty	81
Pair 2	Sprint Treadmill	Anh Suzie	Nocturn (녹턴)	Lee Eun-mee	28
Pair 2	The Hawk Flies Up Falcon	Heo Young-saeng (SS501)	My Love (And)	Buzz	71
Round 3
Finalists	Snowman Cake	Nine9 (Dear Cloud)	Breath (숨)	Park Hyo-shin	-
Finalists	The Hawk Flies Up Falcon	Heo Young-saeng (SS501)	After a Long Time (그 후로 오랫동안)	Shin Seung-hun	-
Final
Battle	Snowman Cake	Nine9 (Dear Cloud)	Previous three songs were used as voting standard		29
Battle	Perfect Aim Marksman	TBA	Sadness Guide (슬픔활용법)	Kim Bum-soo	70

=== The Final Mask King ===
These two last episodes mark the final battle to determine the Final King of Masked Kings and it's the lasts episodes of the season 01. They selected 8 Kings among the 78 crowned kings. This tournament will be different than the others. There will be only two rounds, Round One and the Final Round. In the first Round, the contestants will perform the same song they once performed in the past. Although there will be winners and losers, but no elimination. All will advance to the Final Round, however the winners of Round One will receive a major advantage in the Final Round.

- Contestants: Jang Eun-ah, Sunwoo Jung-a, The One, Lim Jeong-hee, Sandeul of B1A4, Son Seung-yeon, Yoo Hwe-seung of N.Flying, Jung Joon-il
Episode 524 - 525

Episode 524

Episode 524 will be broadcast on December 27, 2025.

Order	Stage Name	Real Name	Song	Original artist	Vote
Special	Perfect Aim Marksman	Tei	"You Were Beautiful" (예뻤어)	Day6	-
Round 1
Pair 1	Fiery Widow	Jang Eun-ah	People Who makes me sad (나를 슬프게 하는 사람들)	Kim Kyung-ho	39
Pair 1	Red Mouth	Sunwoo Jung-a	Whistle (휘파람)	Blackpink	60
Pair 2	Escape from Unemployment	The One	Nocturn (녹턴)	Lee Eun-mee	50
Pair 2	Fairy Pitta	Lim Jeong-hee	Dear Name (이름에게)	IU	49
Pair 3	Incense	Sandeul of B1A4	Hug Me (안아줘)	Jeong Joon-il	28
Pair 3	Invincible East	Son Seung-yeon	Love, that never fades ... (사랑, 결코 시들지 않는...)	Seomoon Tak	71
Pair 4	Victory Trophy	Yoo Hwe-seung of N.Flying	To Her Lover (그녀의 연인에게)	K2	51
Pair 4	Perfume Over Flowers	Jung Joon-il	The Wind is blowing (바람이 분다)	Lee So-ra	48
