= List of King of Mask Singer episodes (2024) =

South Korean variety-music show

- No. of episodes: 45

Release
- Original network: MBC
- Original release: January 7 – December 22, 2024

Season chronology
- ← Previous; 2023 Next → 2025

This is a list of episodes of the South Korean variety-music show King of Mask Singer in 2024. The show airs on MBC as part of their Sunday Night lineup. The names listed below are in performance order.

– Contestant is instantly eliminated by the live audience and judging panel
– After being eliminated, contestant performs a prepared song for the next round and takes off their mask during the instrumental break
– After being eliminated and revealing their identity, contestant has another special performance.
– Contestant advances to the next round.
– Contestant becomes the challenger.
– Mask King.

== Episodes ==
=== 214th Generation Mask King (cont.) ===
- Contestants: Choi Jun-yong, Shin Ji-hoon, Park Jeong-eun, Jung Hyeon-jun, Kim Tae-heon (ZE:A), Han Sang-jin, Lee Seo-yeon (fromis 9), Sung Hoon (Brown Eyed Soul)
Episode 432 - 433

Episode 433

Episode 433 was broadcast on January 7, 2024.

Order	Stage Name	Real Name	Song	Original artist	Vote
Special	Fairy Pitta	Lim Jeong-hee	Halo	Beyoncé	-
Round 2
Pair 1	Don’t Give Up	Choi Jun-yong	Hyung (형)	Norazo	55
Pair 1	Star Fairy	Park Jeong-eun	Even Just Memories (기억만이라도)	Ann	44
Special	Star Fairy	Park Jeong-eun	Remind Of You (된장 찌개를 좋아해)	Park Jeong-eun	-
Pair 2	Christmas In August	Kim Tae-heon of ZE:A	It’s Art (예술이야)	PSY	39
Pair 2	Heavy Snowfall	Lee Seo-yeon of fromis_9	Rose	Lee Hi	60
Round 3
Finalists	Don’t Give Up	Choi Jun-yong	My Way	M.C The MAX	58
Finalists	Heavy Snowfall	Lee Seo-yeon of fromis_9	Playing With Fire	BLACKPINK	41
Final
Battle	Don’t Give Up	Choi Jun-yong	Previous three songs were used as voting standard		11
Battle	Incense	Sandeul of B1A4	Yearning (동경)	Park Hyo-shin	88

=== 215th Generation Mask King ===
- Contestants: Seo Da-hyun (tripleS), Kim Seung-jin, Cha Hyun-seung, BUMJIN, Hoon (U-KISS), HAON, Kim Ga-hee, Yun Min (TOUCHED)
Episode 434 - 435

Episode 434

Episode 434 was broadcast on January 14, 2024.

Order	Stage Name	Real Name	Song	Original artist	Vote
Round 1
Pair 1	Pizza And Cola	Seo Da-hyun of tripleS	Lies (거짓말)	BIGBANG	67
Pair 1	Fried Chicken And Beer	Kim Seung-jin	Lies (거짓말)	BIGBANG	32
2nd song	Fried Chicken And Beer	Kim Seung-jin	Drink Makgeolli (막걸리 한잔)	Kang Jin	-
Pair 2	Moist Lower-Body Bath	Cha Hyun-seung	Me After You (너를 만나)	Paul Kim	35
Pair 2	Steamy Hot Sauna	BUMJIN	Me After You (너를 만나)	Paul Kim	64
2nd song	Moist Lower-Body Bath	Cha Hyun-seung	Beautiful Moment (내 생에 아름다운)	K.Will	-
Pair 3	Blue Dragon Train	Hoon of U-KISS	Snail (달팽이)	Panic	70
Pair 3	A Dragon Rising From The Small Stream	HAON	Snail (달팽이)	Panic	29
2nd song	A Dragon Rising From The Small Stream	HAON	Don’t Go Today (오늘은 가지마)	Lim Se-jun	-
Special	A Dragon Rising From The Small Stream	HAON	Boong-Boong (붕붕)	HAON	-
Pair 4	A Wrong Answer Is Still An Answer	Kim Ga-hee	Dancing To Rhythm (리듬속에 그 춤을)	Kim Wan-sun	28
Pair 4	The Joys And Sorrows Also Count As Rock	Yun Min of TOUCHED	Dancing To Rhythm (리듬속에 그 춤을)	Kim Wan-sun	71
2nd song	A Wrong Answer Is Still An Answer	Kim Ga-hee	You’re One of a Kind (그댄 달라요)	Han Ye-seul	-

Episode 435

Episode 435 was broadcast on January 21, 2024.

Order	Stage Name	Real Name	Song	Original artist	Vote
Round 2
Pair 1	Pizza And Cola	Seo Da-hyun of tripleS	You And I	Park Bom	43
Pair 1	Steamy Hot Sauna	BUMJIN	I Got Lucky (운이 좋았지)	Kwon Jin-ah	56
Pair 2	Blue Dragon Train	Hoon of U-KISS	Festival (페스티벌)	Flower	20
Pair 2	The Joys And Sorrows Also Count As Rock	Yun Min of TOUCHED	For God’s Sake (제발)	Lee So-ra	79
Round 3
Finalists	Steamy Hot Sauna	BUMJIN	Myeongdong Calling (명동컬링)	Crying Nut	19
Finalists	The Joys And Sorrows Also Count As Rock	Yun Min of TOUCHED	PIANISSIMO (피아니시모)	Cherry Filter	80
Final
Battle	The Joys And Sorrows Also Count As Rock	Yun Min of TOUCHED	Previous three songs were used as voting standard		69
Battle	Incense	Sandeul of B1A4	Space (너는 내 세상이었어)	BOL4	30

=== 216th Generation Mask King ===
- Contestants: Nayu (singer) (ILY:1), YEAHSHINE, Jinho (Pentagon), Jang Ji-sou, Agent H, Ji Woo (Emerald Castle), Ahn Shin-ae (The Barberettes), Jo Hye-ryun
Episode 436 - 437

Episode 436

Episode 436 was broadcast on January 28, 2024.

Order	Stage Name	Real Name	Song	Original artist	Vote
Round 1
Pair 1	Grocery Bag	Nayu of ILY:1	Musical (뮤지컬)	Sang A Im-Propp	47
Pair 1	Shopping Bag	YEAHSHINE	Musical (뮤지컬)	Sang A Im-Propp	52
2nd song	Grocery Bag	Nayu of ILY:1	As I Stop (이대로 멈춰)	U Sung-eun	-
Pair 2	Fish Bread Hotspot	Jinho of Pentagon	Shall I Love You Again? (다시 사랑한다 말할까)	Kim Dong-ryul	89
Pair 2	Hyperlocal	Jang Ji-sou	Shall I Love You Again? (다시 사랑한다 말할까)	Kim Dong-ryul	10
2nd song	Hyperlocal	Jang Ji-sou	Go Back (고백)	Dynamic Duo	-
Pair 3	King Of The Hill	Agent H	Where is the End of the Parting (이별의 끝은 어디인가요)	Yang Soo-kyung	46
Pair 3	Super Hilarious	Ji Woo of Emerald Castle	Where is the End of the Parting (이별의 끝은 어디인가요)	Yang Soo-kyung	53
2nd song	King Of The Hill	Agent H	To Her Lover... (그녀의 연인에게)	K2	-
Pair 4	Fluffy Roll Cake	Ahn Shin-ae of The Barberettes	Bésame Mucho (베사메무초) (Korean ver.)	Hyun In	82
Pair 4	Chewy Rice Cake Cake	Jo Hye-ryun	Bésame Mucho (베사메무초) (Korean ver.)	Hyun In	17
2nd song	Chewy Rice Cake Cake	Jo Hye-ryun	Broken Heart (사랑한 후에)	Deulgukhwa	-

Episode 437

Episode 437 was broadcast on February 4, 2024.

Order	Stage Name	Real Name	Song	Original artist	Vote
Round 2
Pair 1	Shopping Bag	YEAHSHINE	Only If I Have You (그대만 있다면)	Weather Forecast	13
Pair 1	Fish Bread Hotspot	Jinho of Pentagon	Baby I Need You (사랑하긴 했었나요 스쳐가는 인연이었나요 짧지않은 우리 함께했던 시간들이 자꾸 내 마음을 가둬두네)	Jannabi	86
Pair 2	Super Hilarious	Ji Woo of Emerald Castle	That Probably Is (아마도 그건)	Choi Yong-joon	20
Pair 2	Fluffy Roll Cake	Ahn Shin-ae of The Barberettes	Rose Blossom (건물 사이에 피어난 장미)	H1-KEY	79
Special	Super Hilarious	Ji Woo of Emerald Castle	Footsteps (발걸음)	Emerald Castle	-
Round 3
Finalists	Fish Bread Hotspot	Jinho of Pentagon	Sorry (미안해) (Korean ver.)	Lena Park	51
Finalists	Fluffy Roll Cake	Ahn Shin-ae of The Barberettes	Spicy	aespa	48
Special	Fluffy Roll Cake	Ahn Shin-ae of The Barberettes	Tears of Mokpo (목포의 눈물)	Lee Nan-young	-
Final
Battle	Fish Bread Hotspot	Jinho of Pentagon	Previous three songs were used as voting standard		44
Battle	The Joys And Sorrows Also Count As Rock	Yun Min of TOUCHED	The Days (그날들)	Kim Kwang-seok	55

=== 217th Generation Mask King ===
- Contestants: Dohwa (AOA), Jung Yi-rang, Gilgu (Gilgu Bonggu), Jeong So-ri, Ten (NCT), Kim Dong-hyun, Cult Billy (Cult), Seo Kyung-seok
Episode 438 - 439

Episode 438

Episode 438 was broadcast on February 11, 2024.

Order	Stage Name	Real Name	Song	Original artist	Vote
Round 1
Pair 1	Lucky Bag	Dohwa of AOA	My Old Story (나의 옛날이야기)	Jo Deok-bae	91
Pair 1	Colorful Traditional Korean Clothing	Jung Yi-rang	My Old Story (나의 옛날이야기)	Jo Deok-bae	8
2nd song	Colorful Traditional Korean Clothing	Jung Yi-rang	The Old Days (아! 옛날이여)	Lee Sun-hee	-
Pair 2	Hansel	Gilgu of GilguBongu	One Late Night in 1994 (1994년 어느 늦은 밤)	Jang Hye-jin	59
Pair 2	Gretel	Jeong So-ri	One Late Night in 1994 (1994년 어느 늦은 밤)	Jang Hye-jin	40
2nd song	Gretel	Jeong So-ri	Remember Me (기억해줘요 내 모든 날과 그때를)	Gummy	-
Special	Gretel	Jeong So-ri	Last Night (작야)	Chosun Blues	-
Pair 3	Digestive Medicine	Ten of NCT	All of my Life	Park Won	15
Pair 3	Fire Extinguisher	Kim Dong-hyun	All of my Life	Park Won	84
2nd song	Digestive Medicine	Ten of NCT	My Love (너를 사랑하고 있어)	Baekhyun	-
Pair 4	Bibimbap	Cult Billy of Cult	Sun (해야)	Magma	63
Pair 4	Korean Sweet Rice Cake	Seo Kyung-seok	Sun (해야)	Magma	36
2nd song	Korean Sweet Rice Cake	Seo Kyung-seok	Missing You (너를 그리며)	Park Nam-jung	-

Episode 439

Episode 439 was broadcast on February 18, 2024.

Order	Stage Name	Real Name	Song	Original artist	Vote
Round 2
Pair 1	Lucky Bag	Dohwa of AOA	Don’t Know You (너를 모르고)	Heize	19
Pair 1	Hansel	Gilgu of GilguBongu	Look At Me (바라봐줘요)	George	80
Pair 2	Fire Extinguisher	Kim Dong-hyun	Beautiful as Always (여전히 아름다운지)	Toy feat. Kim Yeon-woo	73
Pair 2	Bibimbap	Cult Billy of Cult	Alleyway (골목길)	Kim Hyun-sik feat. Shinchon Blues	26
Special	Bibimbap	Cult Billy of Cult	If I Hold You in my Arms (너를 품에 안으면)	Cult	-
Round 3
Finalists	Hansel	Gilgu of GilguBongu	What If (만약에 말야)	Noel	20
Finalists	Fire Extinguisher	Kim Dong-hyun	Let’s Say Goodbye (헤어지자 말해요)	Parc Jae-jung	79
Final
Battle	Fire Extinguisher	Kim Dong-hyun	Previous three songs were used as voting standard		31
Battle	The Joys And Sorrows Also Count As Rock	Yun Min of TOUCHED	Death Note (Korean Ver.)	Death Note: The Musical OST	68

=== 218th Generation Mask King ===
- Contestants: Song Min-jun, Park Ji-hoon, Shin Ye-joo (Isang), Patricia Yiombi, Lee Hwi-jun, Lim Seo-won (UNIS), Ji Ye-eun, Bae In-hyuk (Romantic Punch)
Episode 440 - 441

Episode 440

Episode 440 was broadcast on February 25, 2024.

Order	Stage Name	Real Name	Song	Original artist	Vote
Round 1
Pair 1	School Bell	Song Min-jun	I Want To Fall In Love (사랑에 빠지고 싶다)	Johan Kim	70
Pair 1	Army Bugle Wake-Up Call	Park Ji-hoon	I Want To Fall In Love (사랑에 빠지고 싶다)	Johan Kim	29
2nd song	Army Bugle Wake-Up Call	Park Ji-hoon	When Sorrows Come (슬픔이 올 때)	Shin Sung-woo	-
Pair 2	Croffle	Shin Ye-joo of Isang	Password 486 (비밀번호 486)	Younha	80
Pair 2	Salted Butter Roll	Patricia Yiombi	Password 486 (비밀번호 486)	Younha	19
2nd song	Salted Butter Roll	Patricia Yiombi	Milestone (가리워진 길)	Yoo Jae-ha	-
Pair 3	Overtime Madness	Lee Hwi-jun	We Make A Good Pair (우린 제법 잘 어울려요)	Sung Si-kyung	38
Pair 3	Leaving Work Early	Lim Seo-won of UNIS	We Make A Good Pair (우린 제법 잘 어울려요)	Sung Si-kyung	61
2nd song	Overtime Madness	Lee Hwi-jun	Only Then (그때 헤어지면 돼)	Roy Kim	-
Pair 4	Tick-Tock The Crocodile	Ji Ye-eun	Perhaps Love	HowL & J	39
Pair 4	Captain Hook	Bae In-hyuk of Romantic Punch	Perhaps Love	HowL & J	60
2nd song	Tick-Tock The Crocodile	Ji Ye-eun	Baby Baby	SNSD	-

Episode 441

Episode 441 was broadcast on March 3, 2024.

Order	Stage Name	Real Name	Song	Original artist	Vote
Round 2
Pair 1	School Bell	Song Min-jun	So Long (안녕)	Paul Kim	26
Pair 1	Croffle	Shin Ye-joo of Isang	Some Yearning (어떤 그리움)	Lee Eun-mi	73
Pair 2	Leaving Work Early	Lim Seo-won of UNIS	Part of Your World (Korean ver.)	Danielle	33
Pair 2	Captain Hook	Bae In-hyuk of Romantic Punch	Eve, Psyche & the Bluebeard's Wife (이브, 프시케 그리고 푸른 수염의 아내)	LE SSERAFIM	66
Round 3
Finalists	Croffle	Shin Ye-joo of Isang	Just Live (살다보면)	Cha Ji-yeon	21
Finalists	Captain Hook	Bae In-hyuk of Romantic Punch	Diamond (돌덩이)	Ha Hyun-woo	78
Special	Croffle	Shin Ye-joo of Isang	Dancing To Rhythm (리듬 속에 그 춤을)	Kim Wan-sun	-
Final
Battle	Captain Hook	Bae In-hyuk of Romantic Punch	Previous three songs were used as voting standard		31
Battle	The Joys And Sorrows Also Count As Rock	Yun Min of TOUCHED	Do You Know (아시나요)	Jo Sung-mo	68

=== 219th Generation Mask King ===
- Contestants: Lee Sang-min, Lee Sang-ho, Park So-eun of (Weeekly), Hwang Woo-lim, Kim Ban-jang, Song Sung-ho, Kim Seung-hyun, Ji Se-hee
Episode 442 - 443

Episode 442

Episode 442 was broadcast on March 10, 2024.

Order	Stage Name	Real Name	Song	Original artist	Vote
Round 1
Pair 1	Talented Intern	Lee Sang-min	Today, I (오늘도 난)	Lee Seung-chul	47
Pair 1	Manager Perpetually Seeking A Promotion	Lee Sang-ho	Today, I (오늘도 난)	Lee Seung-chul	52
2nd song	Talented Intern	Lee Sang-min	Kinnikuman Theme Song (Korean ver.) (질풍가도)	Ryu Jung-seok	-
Pair 2	Life Is A Puppetshow	Park So-eun of Weeekly	Invitation (초대)	Uhm Jung-hwa	20
Pair 2	Reality Is A Circus	Hwang Woo-lim	Invitation (초대)	Uhm Jung-hwa	79
2nd song	Life Is A Puppetshow	Park So-eun of Weeekly	Star (별)	Youme	-
Pair 3	Nutritional Lunchbox	Kim Ban-jang	Silent For A While (한동안 뜸했었지)	Love & Peace	50
Pair 3	Carefully Crafted Character-Themed Lunch	Song Sung-ho	Silent For A While (한동안 뜸했었지)	Love & Peace	49
2nd song	Carefully Crafted Character-Themed Lunch	Song Sung-ho	My Love (And)	Buzz	-
Pair 4	Baby Mobile Goes Round And Round	Kim Seung-hyun	Scattered Days (흩어진 나날들)	Kang Susie	15
Pair 4	A Full Head Of Hair	Ji Se-hee	Scattered Days (흩어진 나날들)	Kang Susie	84
2nd song	Baby Mobile Goes Round And Round	Kim Seung-hyun	Very Old Couples (아주 오래된 연인들)	015B	-

Episode 443

Episode 443 was broadcast on March 17, 2024.

Order	Stage Name	Real Name	Song	Original artist	Vote
Round 2
Pair 1	Manager Perpetually Seeking A Promotion	Lee Sang-ho	The Last Game (마지막 승부)	Kim Min-kyo	10
Pair 1	Reality Is A Circus	Hwang Woo-lim	Don’t Say It’s Not Love (사랑이 아니라 말하지 말아요)	Lee So-ra	89
Pair 2	Nutritional Lunchbox	Kim Ban-jang	Only You Can (당신만이)	Lee Chi-hyun & Friends	28
Pair 2	A Full Head Of Hair	Ji Se-hee	Cinderella (신데렐라)	Seo In-young	71
Round 3
Finalists	Reality Is A Circus	Hwang Woo-lim	Love, ing (열애중)	Ben	19
Finalists	A Full Head Of Hair	Ji Se-hee	Twenty-Five, Twenty-One (스물다섯, 스물하나)	Jaurim	80
Final
Battle	A Full Head Of Hair	Ji Se-hee	Previous three songs were used as voting standard		44
Battle	The Joys And Sorrows Also Count As Rock	Yun Min of TOUCHED	Rose of Versailles (베르사이유의 장미)	Nemesis	55

=== 220th Generation Mask King ===
- Contestants: Kim Yoon-oh of (High4), Belle of (Kiss of Life), Hyuk of (Tempest), Kim So-yeon, Yoon Young-mi, Kim Myeong-ki of (Hwal Band), Cho Jin-se, Jeon Sang-keun
Episode 444 - 445

Episode 444

Episode 444 was broadcast on March 24, 2024.

Order	Stage Name	Real Name	Song	Original artist	Vote
Round 1
Pair 1	12.12: The Day	Kim Yoon-oh of High4	What the Spring?? (봄이 좋냐??)	10cm	74
Pair 1	When Spring Comes	Belle of Kiss of Life	What the Spring?? (봄이 좋냐??)	10cm	25
2nd song	When Spring Comes	Belle of Kiss of Life	Psycho	Red Velvet	-
Pair 2	Dandelion	Hyuk of Tempest	Four Seasons (사계)	Taeyeon	30
Pair 2	Dandelion Seed	Kim So-yeon	Four Seasons (사계)	Taeyeon	69
2nd song	Dandelion	Hyuk of Tempest	Fall (어떻게 지네)	Crush	-
Pair 3	Wild Garlic Wants To Be The King	Yoon Young-mi	Eternal Companions (영원한 친구)	Na-mi	25
Pair 3	Burdock Will Cry If They Don’t Become The King	Kim Myeong-ki of Hwal Band	Eternal Companions (영원한 친구)	Na-mi	74
2nd song	Wild Garlic Wants To Be The King	Yoon Young-mi	Amor Fati (아모르 파티)	Kim Yon-ja	-
Pair 4	Float Like A Butterfly	Cho Jin-se	Delete (삭제)	Lee Seung-gi	22
Pair 4	Sting Like A Bee	Jeon Sang-keun	Delete (삭제)	Lee Seung-gi	77
2nd song	Float Like A Butterfly	Cho Jin-se	Emergency Room (응급실)	izi	-

Episode 445

Episode 445 was broadcast on March 31, 2024.

Order	Stage Name	Real Name	Song	Original artist	Vote
Round 2
Pair 1	12.12: The Day	Kim Yoon-oh of High4	You In My Tears (눈물 속에 그대)	Kang Seung-mo	48
Pair 1	Dandelion Seed	Kim So-yeon	Courtship (구애)	Sunwoo Jung-a	51
Pair 2	Burdock Will Cry If They Don’t Become The King	Kim Myeong-ki of Hwal Band	The Love I Committed (내가 저지른 사랑)	Im Chang-jung	21
Pair 2	Sting Like A Bee	Jeon Sang-keun	How Are You (어떤가요)	Lee Jung-bong	78
Special	Burdock Will Cry If They Don’t Become The King	Kim Myeong-ki of Hwal Band	Say Yes	Hwal Band	-
Round 3
Finalists	Dandelion Seed	Kim So-yeon	Nocturne (야상곡)	Kim Yoon-ah	33
Finalists	Sting Like A Bee	Jeon Sang-keun	Recede (멀어지다)	Nell	66
Final
Battle	Sting Like A Bee	Jeon Sang-keun	Previous three songs were used as voting standard		30
Battle	The Joys And Sorrows Also Count As Rock	Yun Min of TOUCHED	Come Into My Mind (생각이 나)	Boohwal	69

=== 221st Generation Mask King ===
- Contestants: Minseo, Jungmo of (Cravity), Park Tae-hee of (YB), Park Sung-on, Hanhae, Sam Hammington, Honey J of (HolyBang), Kim Soo-ha
Episode 446 - 447

Episode 446

Episode 446 was originally scheduled to be broadcast on April 7, 2024. It was instead broadcast on April 14, 2024.

Order	Stage Name	Real Name	Song	Original artist	Vote
Opening Special	Singing Iguana	Yoon Do-hyun of YB	Fix You	Coldplay	-
Round 1
Pair 1	On A Winning Streak	Minseo	Thinking of You (널 생각해)	One More Chance	86
Pair 1	Two Outs In The Ninth Inning	Jungmo of Cravity	Thinking of You (널 생각해)	One More Chance	13
2nd song	Two Outs In The Ninth Inning	Jungmo of Cravity	Stalker (스토커)	10cm	-
Pair 2	Gently Swinging Guppy	Park Tae-hee of YB	Becoming Dust (먼지가 되어)	Lee Mi-ki	35
Pair 2	Grinning White Puppy	Park Sung-on	Becoming Dust (먼지가 되어)	Lee Mi-ki	64
2nd song	Gently Swinging Guppy	Park Tae-hee of YB	Whistle (휘파람)	Lee Moon-sae	-
Pair 3	Slick Gu Jun-pyo	Hanhae	Itaewon Freedom (이태원 프리덤)	UV feat. Park Jin-young	79
Pair 3	Truthful Gura	Sam Hammington	Itaewon Freedom (이태원 프리덤)	UV feat. Park Jin-young	20
2nd song	Truthful Gura	Sam Hammington	She Was Pretty (그녀는 예뻤다)	Park Jin-young	-
Pair 4	Love Is 99.9 Degrees	Honey J of HolyBang	Happy Me (행복한 나를)	Eco	26
Pair 4	Galaxy Express 999	Kim Soo-ha	Happy Me (행복한 나를)	Eco	73
2nd song	Love Is 99.9 Degrees	Honey J of HolyBang	Miss Korea (미스코리아)	Lee Hyori	-

Episode 447

Episode 447 was broadcast on April 21, 2024.

Order	Stage Name	Real Name	Song	Original artist	Vote
Special Stage		BMK	Fly Me to the Moon	Frank Sinatra	-
Round 2
Pair 1	On A Winning Streak	Minseo	Forest (숲)	Choi Yu-ree	61
Pair 1	Grinning White Puppy	Park Sung-on	Seoul People (서울 사람들)	Busker Busker	38
Pair 2	Slick Gu Jun-pyo	Hanhae	Just Like That (그냥 그렇게)	Lee Seung-chul	26
Pair 2	Galaxy Express 999	Kim Soo-ha	strawberry moon	IU	73
Round 3
Finalists	On A Winning Streak	Minseo	I Will Go to You Like the First Snow (첫눈처럼 너에게 가겠다)	Ailee	14
Finalists	Galaxy Express 999	Kim Soo-ha	Blue Whale (흰수염고래)	YB	85
Final
Battle	Galaxy Express 999	Kim Soo-ha	Previous three songs were used as voting standard		39
Battle	The Joys And Sorrows Also Count As Rock	Yun Min of TOUCHED	Moonflower (야래향)	Lucia	60

=== 222nd Generation Mask King ===
- Contestants: Gyubin, Kang Yu-chan of (A.C.E), Kim Jung-woo of (TOXIC), Sunnie of (The Barberettes), Jiyoon of (4Minute), Phan Yu-geol, Lim Kyu-hyung of (Crezl), Don Mills
Episode 448 - 449

Episode 448

Episode 448 was broadcast on April 28, 2024.

Order	Stage Name	Real Name	Song	Original artist	Vote
Round 1
Pair 1	Blowout Sale	Gyubin	How Can I Love the Heartbreak, You’re the One I Love (어떻게 이별까지 사랑하겠어, 널 사랑하는 거지)	AKMU	59
Pair 1	Afro	Kang Yu-chan of A.C.E	How Can I Love the Heartbreak, You’re the One I Love (어떻게 이별까지 사랑하겠어, 널 사랑하는 거지)	AKMU	40
2nd song	Afro	Kang Yu-chan of A.C.E	Thought of You (네 생각)	John Park	-
Pair 2	Watermill	Kim Jung-woo of TOXIC	We Need to Talk (대화가 필요해)	The Jadu	26
Pair 2	Wind Turbine	Sunnie of The Barberettes	We Need to Talk (대화가 필요해)	The Jadu	73
2nd song	Watermill	Kim Jung-woo of TOXIC	Forever (영원)	SKY	-
Pair 3	Calorie Bomb Burger	Jiyoon of 4Minute	Don’t Leave Me, Don’t Leave Me (날 떠나지마)	Park Jin-young	54
Pair 3	Poke Monster	Phan Yu-geol	Don’t Leave Me, Don’t Leave Me (날 떠나지마)	Park Jin-young	45
2nd song	Poke Monster	Phan Yu-geol	With You (그대와 함께)	The Blue	-
Pair 4	Night-Operating Palace	Lim Kyu-hyung of Crezl	Expression of Love (애정표현)	Flower	78
Pair 4	Mother-of-Pearl Cabinet	Don Mills	Expression of Love (애정표현)	Flower	21
2nd song	Mother-of-Pearl Cabinet	Don Mills	Tic Tac Toe	Buga Kingz	-

Episode 449

Episode 449 was broadcast on May 5, 2024.

Order	Stage Name	Real Name	Song	Original artist	Vote
Round 2
Pair 1	Blowout Sale	Gyubin	Loving U	Park Hey-kyoung	26
Pair 1	Wind Turbine	Sunnie of The Barberettes	The End (끝)	Kwon Jin-ah	73
Pair 2	Calorie Bomb Burger	Jiyoon of 4Minute	Eyes, Nose, Lips (눈,코,입)	Taeyang	10
Pair 2	Night-Operating Palace	Lim Kyu-hyung of Crezl	Run	Ha Dong-kyun	89
Round 3
Finalists	Wind Turbine	Sunnie of The Barbarettes	Good Bye Sadness, Hello Happiness	Yoon Mi-rae	9
Finalists	Night-Operating Palace	Lim Kyu-hyung of Crezl	Y Si Fuera Ella (Korean ver.) (혜야)	Shinee	90
Final
Battle	Night-Operating Palace	Lim Kyu-hyung of Crezl	Previous three songs were used as voting standard		40
Battle	The Joys And Sorrows Also Count As Rock	Yun Min of TOUCHED	Wind That Blows (그대가 분다)	M.C The Max	59

=== 223rd Generation Mask King ===
- Contestants: Shin Yu-jin of (Leenalchi), Lee Il-min, Kim Min-a, Liz of (IVE), Hur Song-yeon, Songsun of (TRI.BE), Leenu, Kim Chung-hoon
Episode 450 - 451

Episode 450

Episode 450 was broadcast on May 12, 2024.

Order	Stage Name	Real Name	Song	Original artist	Vote
Round 1
Pair 1	Precious Daughter	Shin Yu-jin of Leenalchi	Sad Fate (Korean ver.) (슬픈 인연)	Na-mi	60
Pair 1	Sturdy Father	Lee Il-min	Sad Fate (Korean ver.) (슬픈 인연)	Na-mi	39
2nd song	Sturdy Father	Lee Il-min	One Love (하나의 사랑)	Park Sang-min	-
Pair 2	Sandbox	Kim Min-a	Flower Road (꽃길)	Yoon Soo-hyun	35
Pair 2	Hourglass	Liz of IVE	Flower Road (꽃길)	Yoon Soo-hyun	64
2nd song	Sandbox	Kim Min-a	Love Me Love Me	Lee Ji-hye	-
Pair 3	Crispy Pork Belly	Hur Song-yeon	Because I am a Woman (여자이니까)	Kiss	37
Pair 3	Smoked Chicken	Songsun of TRI.BE	Because I am a Woman (여자이니까)	Kiss	62
2nd song	Crispy Pork Belly	Hur Song-yeon	Imagination (환상)	Park Ji-yoon	-
Pair 4	Lucky Box	Leenu	My Love by my Side (내사랑 내곁에)	Kim Hyun-sik	70
Pair 4	Allowance Box	Kim Chung-hoon	My Love by my Side (내사랑 내곁에)	Kim Hyun-sik	29
2nd song	Allowance Box	Kim Chung-hoon	A Flower Yet to Bloom (목다핀 꽃 한송이)	Kim Soo-chul	-

Episode 451

Episode 451 was broadcast on May 19, 2024.

Order	Stage Name	Real Name	Song	Original artist	Vote
Round 2
Pair 1	Precious Daughter	Shin Yu-jin of Leenalchi	Crazy Excuse (미친 소리)	Lee Ye-joon	71
Pair 1	Hourglass	Liz of IVE	The Red Shoes (분홍신)	IU	28
Pair 2	Smoked Chicken	Songsun of TRI.BE	Once More Farewell (한번 더 이별)	Sung Si-kyung	19
Pair 2	Lucky Box	Leenu	Addicted to Love (중독된 사랑)	Cho Jang-hyuk	80
Round 3
Finalists	Precious Daughter	Shin Yu-jin of Leenalchi	The Painted on the Moonlight (달빛에 그려지는)	Miyeon	39
Finalists	Lucky Box	Leenu	Ice Fortress (얼음요새)	Dear Cloud	60
Special	Precious Daughter	Shin Yu-jin of Leenalchi	Tiger is Coming (범 내려온다)	Leenalchi	-
Final
Battle	Lucky Box	Leenu	Previous three songs were used as voting standard		30
Battle	The Joys And Sorrows Also Count As Rock	Yun Min of TOUCHED	Turtle Ship (거북선)	Kim Jong-seo	69

=== 224th Generation Mask King ===
- Contestants: Song Min-kyung, Na Go-eun of (Purple Kiss), Nah Sang-hyun of (Band Nah), Cho Jun-hyun, Cha Soo-kyung, Im Woo-il, Yoo Seung-eon of (Evnne), Min Woo-hyuk
Episode 452 - 453

Episode 452

Episode 452 was broadcast on May 26, 2024.

Order	Stage Name	Real Name	Song	Original artist	Vote
Round 1
Pair 1	Soft And Silky Hair	Song Min-kyung	Fix My Makeup (화장을 고치고)	Wax	40
Pair 1	Drifting Through The Breeze	Na Go-eun of Purple Kiss	Fix My Makeup (화장을 고치고)	Wax	59
2nd song	Soft And Silky Hair	Song Min-kyung	Thanks My Life (인생아 고마웠다)	Cho Hang-jo	-
Pair 2	Dutch Coffee	Nah Sang-hyun of Band Nah	After a Breakup (널 보낸 후에)	Choi Jae-hoon	82
Pair 2	Going Dutch	Cho Jun-hyun	After a Breakup (널 보낸 후에)	Choi Jae-hoon	17
2nd song	Going Dutch	Cho Jun-hyun	I Have No Problem (나는 문제 없어)	Hwang Gyu-young	-
Pair 3	Crystal	Cha Soo-kyung	Wind, Please Be Still (바람아 멈추어 다오)	Lee Ji-yeon	78
Pair 3	Korean Traditional Face Mask	Im Woo-il	Wind, Please Be Still (바람아 멈추어 다오)	Lee Ji-yeon	21
2nd song	Korean Traditional Face Mask	Im Woo-il	You Are the Only One (오직 하나뿐인)	Shim Sin	-
Pair 4	Wrestling Champion	Yoo Seung-eon of Evnne	Lie Lie Lie (거짓말 거짓말 거짓말)	Lee Juck	34
Pair 4	Heracles	Min Woo-hyuk	Lie Lie Lie (거짓말 거짓말 거짓말)	Lee Juck	65
2nd song	Wrestling Champion	Yoo Seung-eon of Evnne	Wish (소원)	Han Woong-jae	-

Episode 453

Episode 453 was broadcast on June 2, 2024.

Order	Stage Name	Real Name	Song	Original artist	Vote
Round 2
Pair 1	Drifting Through The Breeze	Na Go-eun of Purple Kiss	Back in Time (시간을 거슬러)	Lyn	29
Pair 1	Dutch Coffee	Nah Sang-hyun of Band Nah	Solution (답)	Kang San-eh	70
Pair 2	Crystal	Cha Soo-kyung	Maria	Hwasa	21
Pair 2	Heracles	Min Woo-hyuk	It’s Not Love if it Hurts Too Much (너무 아픈 사랑은 사랑이 아니었음을)	Kim Kwang-seok	78
Special	Crystal	Cha Soo-kyung	Unforgivable (용서 못해)	Cha Soo-kyung	-
Round 3
Finalists	Dutch Coffee	Nah Sang-hyun of Band Nah	White Night (백야)	Zitten	16
Finalists	Heracles	Min Woo-hyuk	Good Day (좋은 날)	MeloMance	83
Final
Battle	Heracles	Min Woo-hyuk	Previous three songs were used as voting standard		52
Battle	The Joys And Sorrows Also Count As Rock	Yun Min of TOUCHED	Amateur (아마추어)	Lee Seung-chul	47

=== 225th Generation Mask King ===
- Contestants: Chuu, Ji Su-won, Kim Young-kwang, Austin Kim of (Fortena), Roh Tae-hyun of (HOTSHOT) and (JBJ), Kahi of (After School), kik5o, Sung Dae-hyun of (R.ef)
Episode 454 - 455

Episode 454

Episode 454 was broadcast on June 9, 2024.

Order	Stage Name	Real Name	Song	Original artist	Vote
Round 1
Pair 1	Sweet Bam Yang Gang	Chuu	Farewell For Myself (날 위한 이별)	Kim Hye-rim	79
Pair 1	Bitter Espresso	Ji Su-won	Farewell For Myself (날 위한 이별)	Kim Hye-rim	20
2nd song	Bitter Espresso	Ji Su-won	Anyone Would Do (누구라도 그러하듯이)	Bae In-sook	-
Pair 2	P.E. Teacher	Kim Young-kwang	If Like Me (나와 같다면)	Kim Jang-hoon	25
Pair 2	Music Teacher	Austin Kim of Fortena	If Like Me (나와 같다면)	Kim Jang-hoon	74
2nd song	P.E. Teacher	Kim Young-kwang	Love Two (사랑two)	Yoon Do-hyun	-
Pair 3	Floppy Disk	Roh Tae-hyun of HOTSHOT/JBJ	See Through (씨스루)	Primary	42
Pair 3	Videotape	Kahi of After School	See Through (씨스루)	Primary	57
2nd song	Floppy Disk	Roh Tae-hyun of HOTSHOT/JBJ	Lie (미안해)	Yang Da-il	-
Pair 4	The Queen’s Elegance	kik5o	It Is Too Late (너무 늦었잖아요)	Byun Jin-sub	80
Pair 4	The King’s Dignity	Sung Dae-hyun of R.ef	It Is Too Late (너무 늦었잖아요)	Byun Jin-sub	19
2nd song	The King’s Dignity	Sung Dae-hyun of R.ef	A Letter (인사)	BUMJIN	-

Episode 455

Episode 455 was broadcast on June 16, 2024.

Order	Stage Name	Real Name	Song	Original artist	Vote
Round 2
Pair 1	Sweet Bam Yang Gang	Chuu	Rebirth (환생)	Yoon Jong-shin	32
Pair 1	Music Teacher	Austin Kim of Fortena	Beautiful Moment (내 생에 아름다운)	K.Will	67
Pair 2	Videotape	Kahi of After School	Traffic Light (초록빛)	Paul Kim	22
Pair 2	The Queen’s Elegance	kik5o	Flying Duck (오리 날다)	Cherry Filter	77
Round 3
Finalists	Music Teacher	Austin Kim of Fortena	The Wind is Blowing (바람이 분다)	Lee So-ra	36
Finalists	The Queen’s Elegance	kik5o	Because It’s You (그대라서)	Gummy	63
Final
Battle	The Queen’s Elegance	kik5o	Previous three songs were used as voting standard		15
Battle	Heracles	Min Woo-hyuk	Knot (매듭)	Ha Dong-kyun	84

=== 226th Generation Mask King ===
- Contestants: Zhang Liyin, Nana of (Wooah), Joseph of (4Men), Song Yeong-gil, Kim Jung-yeon, Park Hyo-jun, Jihoon of (Treasure), Jang Han-na
Episode 456 - 457

Episode 456

Episode 456 was broadcast on June 23, 2024.

Order	Stage Name	Real Name	Song	Original artist	Vote
Round 1
Pair 1	Cookie That I Made	Zhang Liyin	I Love You (너를 사랑해)	S.E.S.	62
Pair 1	So Lucky Vicky	Nana of WOOAH	I Love You (너를 사랑해)	S.E.S.	37
2nd song	So Lucky Vicky	Nana of WOOAH	SPOT!	Zico	-
Pair 2	I’ll Do As You Say Hippo	Joseph of 4Men	Drunken Truth (취중진담)	Exhibition	86
Pair 2	Keep Growing Softshell Turtle	Song Yeong-gil	Drunken Truth (취중진담)	Exhibition	13
2nd song	Keep Growing Softshell Turtle	Song Yeong-gil	I Am Firefly (나는 반딧불이)	Lunch	-
Pair 3	Quickly Gain And Lose Weight	Kim Jung-yeon	This Night Once Again (이밤을 다시 한번)	Jo Ha-moon	47
Pair 3	Muscle Loss	Park Hyo-jun	This Night Once Again (이밤을 다시 한번)	Jo Ha-moon	52
2nd song	Quickly Gain And Lose Weight	Kim Jung-yeon	Words of the End (말꼬리)	Yoon Jong-shin & Jung Joon-il	-
Pair 4	Banana Boat	Jihoon of TREASURE	Intuition (직감)	CNBLUE	44
Pair 4	Are You Going Bananas For Me?	Jang Han-na	Intuition (직감)	CNBLUE	55
2nd song	Banana Boat	Jihoon of TREASURE	You Who Do Not Reply (대답없는 너)	Kim Jong-seo	-

Episode 457

Episode 457 was broadcast on June 30, 2024.

Order	Stage Name	Real Name	Song	Original artist	Vote
Round 2
Pair 1	Cookie That I Made	Zhang Liyin	Beautiful	Crush	35
Pair 1	I’ll Do As You Say Hippo	Joseph of 4Men	Scent of You (그대의 향기)	Yoo Young-jin	64
Special	Cookie That I Made	Zhang Liyin	Timeless	Zhang Liyin feat. XIA	-
Pair 2	Muscle Loss	Park Hyo-jun	A Night’s Dream (하룻밤의 꿈)	Lee Sang-woo	10
Pair 2	Are You Going Bananas For Me?	Jang Han-na	It Hurts (아파) (Slow)	2NE1	89
Round 3
Finalists	I’ll Do As You Say Hippo	Joseph of 4Men	Living in the Same Time (같은 시간 속에 너)	Naul	57
Finalists	Are You Going Bananas For Me?	Jang Han-na	Momentarily Lost (잠시 길을 잃다)	015B	42
Final
Battle	I’ll Do As You Say Hippo	Joseph of 4Men	Previous three songs were used as voting standard		47
Battle	Heracles	Min Woo-hyuk	The Night	Choi Baek-ho	52

=== 227th Generation Mask King ===
- Contestants: H-Eugene, I.N of (Stray Kids), Lee Mi-ri, Na-Young Jeon, Feel Sun Kim, Lee Byeong-chan, Park Yeong-gyu, Mickey Kwangsoo
Episode 458 - 459

Episode 458

Episode 458 was broadcast on July 7, 2024.

Order	Stage Name	Real Name	Song	Original artist	Vote
Round 1
Pair 1	Foxtail	H-Eugene	The Live Long Day (긴 하루)	Lee Seung-chul	32
Pair 1	Catnip	I.N of Stray Kids	The Live Long Day (긴 하루)	Lee Seung-chul	67
2nd song	Foxtail	H-Eugene	One Love	1TYM	-
Pair 2	I’ll Buy You Sashimi	Lee Mi-ri	Around Thirty (서름 즈음에)	Kim Kwang-seok	11
Pair 2	I'll Give You The Company	Na-Young Jeon	Around Thirty (서름 즈음에)	Kim Kwang-seok	88
2nd song	I’ll Buy You Sashimi	Lee Mi-ri	When you Pass the Book of Memories (추억의 책장을 넘기면)	Lee Sun-hee	-
Pair 3	Flower Vase	Feel Sun Kim	Only Thing to Give you is Love (네게 줄 수있는 건 사랑뿐)	Byun Jin-sub	39
Pair 3	Flower Pot	Lee Byeong-chan	Only Thing to Give you is Love (네게 줄 수있는 건 사랑뿐)	Byun Jin-sub	60
2nd song	Flower Vase	Feel Sun Kim	The Snowman (눈사람)	Jung Seung-hwan	-
Pair 4	Limit Excess	Park Yeong-gyu	Man (사내)	Na Hoon-a	90
Pair 4	Over Capacity	Mickey Kwangsoo	Man (사내)	Na Hoon-a	9
2nd song	Over Capacity	Mickey Kwangsoo	Kung Ddari Sha Bah Rah (쿵따리 샤바라)	Clon	-

Episode 459

Episode 459 was broadcast on July 14, 2024.

Order	Stage Name	Real Name	Song	Original artist	Vote
Round 2
Pair 1	Catnip	I.N of Stray Kids	Love, That Common Word (사랑한다는 흔한말)	Kim Yeon-woo	24
Pair 1	I’ll Give You The Company	Na-Young Jeon	I’ll Write To You (편지할게요)	Lena Park	75
Special	Catnip	I.N of Stray Kids	Mermaid	BOL4	-
Pair 2	Flower Pot	Lee Byeong-chan	If You’re Gonna Be Like This (이럴거면)	Ivy	60
Pair 2	Limit Excess	Park Yeong-gyu	Story of Old Couple in Their 60s (어느 60대 노부부 이야기)	Kim Mok-kyung	39
Special	Limit Excess	Park Yeong-gyu	Chameleon (카멜레온)	Park Yeong-gyu	-
Special	Limit Excess	Park Yeong-gyu	Love Forever (사랑은 영원히)	Patti Kim	-
Round 3
Finalists	I'll Give You The Company	Na-Young Jeon	Run With Me (도망가자)	Sunwoo Jung-a	36
Finalists	Flower Pot	Lee Byeong-chan	Higher	Ailee ft. Yiruma	63
Final
Battle	Flower Pot	Lee Byeong-chan	Previous three songs were used as voting standard		39
Battle	Heracles	Min Woo-hyuk	Consolation (위로)	Yim Jae-beom	60

=== 228th Generation Mask King ===
- Contestants: DeVita, Park Ji-min, Ma Sun-ho, Hwang Ga-ram of (Pinocchio), Xiaojun of (NCT), Heejae of (Sevenus), Kim Hwan-hee, Hyolyn
Episode 460 - 461

Episode 460

Episode 460 was broadcast on July 21, 2024.

Order	Stage Name	Real Name	Song	Original artist	Vote
Opening Special	The Joys And Sorrows Also Count As Rock	Yun Min of Touched	What Am I To Do (나 어떡해)	Sanulrim	-
Round 1
Pair 1	Coconut Juice	DeVita	Airplane (비행기)	Turtles	62
Pair 1	Mango Juice	Park Ji-min	Airplane (비행기)	Turtles	37
2nd song	Mango Juice	Park Ji-min	I Think I	Byul	-
Pair 2	Too Hot To Fall Asleep	Ma Sun-ho	After This Night (이 밤이 지나면)	Yim Jae-beom	15
Pair 2	Drifting Asleep Air Conditioner	Hwang Ga-ram of Pinocchio	After This Night (이 밤이 지나면)	Yim Jae-beom	84
2nd song	Too Hot To Fall Asleep	Ma Sun-ho	I Love You (사랑해요)	Kim Bum-soo	-
Pair 3	Early Bird Dracula	Xiaojun of NCT	Dear Name (이름에게)	IU	56
Pair 3	Zombie In Love	Heejae of Sevenus	Dear Name (이름에게)	IU	43
2nd song	Zombie In Love	Heejae of Sevenus	You’re Just At a Higher Place Than Me (나보다 조금 더 높은 곳에 니가 있을뿐)	Shin Seung-hun	-
Pair 4	Over The Rainbow	Kim Hwan-hee	Swing Baby	Park Jin-young	21
Pair 4	Under The Sea	Hyolyn	Swing Baby	Park Jin-young	78
2nd song	Over The Rainbow	Kim Hwan-hee	Uh-Oh	(G)I-DLE	-

Episode 461

Episode 461 was broadcast on August 18, 2024, skipping three weeks to live broadcast the Paris 2024 Summer Olympics.

Order	Stage Name	Real Name	Song	Original artist	Vote
Round 2
Pair 1	Coconut Juice	DeVita	The Reason Why I Became a Singer (가수가 된 이유)	Shin Yong-jae	13
Pair 1	Drifting Asleep Air Conditioner	Hwang Ga-ram of Pinocchio	To you, far away in my memories (기억속의 먼 그대에게)	Park Mi-kyeong	86
Pair 2	Early Bird Dracula	Xiaojun of NCT	Love You With All My Heart (미안해 미워해 사랑해)	Crush	10
Pair 2	Under The Sea	Hyolyn	Can’t Do This (안되는데)	4Men	89
Round 3
Finalists	Drifting Asleep Air Conditioner	Hwang Ga-ram of Pinocchio	Please Love Her (그녀를 사랑해줘요)	Ha Dong-kyun	27
Finalists	Under The Sea	Hyolyn	Last Love (마지막 사랑)	Park Ki-young	72
Special	Drifting Asleep Air Conditioner	Hwang Ga-ram of Pinocchio	Between Love And Friendship (사랑과 우정 사이)	Pinocchio	-
Final
Battle	Under The Sea	Hyolyn	Previous three songs were used as voting standard		58
Battle	Heracles	Min Woo-hyuk	If We Ever Meet Again (다시 만날 수 있을까)	Lim Young-woong	41

=== 229th Generation Mask King ===
- Contestants: DOKO, Jeong Ho-cheol, Park Hyun-ho, Choi Hyang, Minyoung of (BBGIRLS), Heejin of (ARTMS), Chu Seung-yeob of (Achtung), Kim Nam-il
Episode 462 - 463

Episode 462

Episode 462 was broadcast on August 25, 2024.

Order	Stage Name	Real Name	Song	Original artist	Vote
Round 1
Pair 1	Dalgona Coffee	DOKO	Can I Love You? (사랑해도 될까요)	Yurisangja	93
Pair 1	Extra Shot To The Iced Tea	Jeong Ho-cheol	Can I Love You? (사랑해도 될까요)	Yurisangja	6
2nd song	Extra Shot To The Iced Tea	Jeong Ho-cheol	Prince of the Sea (바다의 왕자)	Park Myung-soo	-
Pair 2	Multitasker	Park Hyun-ho	Timeless	Zhang Liyin feat. Kim Junsu	47
Pair 2	Extension Cord	Choi Hyang	Timeless	Zhang Liyin feat. Kim Junsu	52
2nd song	Multitasker	Park Hyun-ho	Tarzan (타잔)	Yoon Do-hyun	-
Pair 3	Samba	Minyoung of BBGIRLS	I Go	Rumble Fish	59
Pair 3	Flamenco	Heejin of ARTMS	I Go	Rumble Fish	40
2nd song	Flamenco	Heejin of ARTMS	Flying Girl (비행소녀)	Magolpy	-
Pair 4	You Are My Destiny	Chu Seung-yeob of Achtung	Rain and You (비와 당신)	Park Joong-hoon	72
Pair 4	You Are My Hero	Kim Nam-il	Rain and You (비와 당신)	Park Joong-hoon	27
2nd song	You Are My Hero	Kim Nam-il	Barley Hill (보릿고개)	Jin Sung	-

Episode 463

Episode 463 was broadcast on September 1, 2024.

Order	Stage Name	Real Name	Song	Original artist	Vote
Round 2
Pair 1	Dalgona Coffee	DOKO	Delete (삭제)	Lee Seung-gi	20
Pair 1	Extension Cord	Choi Hyang	Clockwork (시계 태엽)	Lim Jeong-hee	79
Pair 2	Samba	Minyoung of BB GIRLS	I Imagine Dangerous Love. (나는 위험한 사랑을 상상한다.)	Kim Yoon-ah	38
Pair 2	You Are My Destiny	Chu Seung-yeob of Achtung	Girl’s Generation (소녀시대)	Lee Seung-chul	61
Round 3
Finalists	Extension Cord	Choi Hyang	Women (여자)	Big Mama	46
Finalists	You Are My Destiny	Chu Seung-yeob of Achtung	Until the Morning Breaks (아침이 밝아올때 까지)	Deulgukhwa	53
Final
Battle	You Are My Destiny	Chu Seung-yeob of Achtung	Previous three songs were used as voting standard		24
Battle	Under The Sea	Hyolyn	Jasmine (말리꽃)	Lee Seung-chul	75

=== 230th Generation Mask King ===
- Contestants: Chowon of (LIGHTSUM), 1G, Jin-uk, Jang Jung-hyuk of (Jang Deok Cheol), Yoon Ga-yi, Oh Yu-jin, Yu Ho-jin, K2
Episode 464 - 465

Episode 464

Episode 464 was broadcast on September 8, 2024.

Order	Stage Name	Real Name	Song	Original artist	Vote
Round 1
Pair 1	Janggeum-i	Chowon of LIGHTSUM	I’m Not Alone (혼자가 아닌 나)	Suh Young-eun	84
Pair 1	Ripe Persimmon	1G	I’m Not Alone (혼자가 아닌 나)	Suh Young-eun	15
2nd song	Ripe Persimmon	1G	Punk Kid (개구쟁이)	Sanulrim	-
Pair 2	Peppermint Candy	Jin-uk	A Man (한 남자)	Kim Jong-kook	57
Pair 2	Hard Candy	Jang Jung-hyuk of Jang Deok Cheol	A Man (한 남자)	Kim Jong-kook	42
2nd song	Hard Candy	Jang Jung-hyuk of Jang Deok Cheol	First Feeling As It Is (처음 느낌 그대로)	Lee So-ra	-
Pair 3	Reed Field	Yoon Ga-yi	Violet Fragrance (보랏빛 향기)	Kang Susie	37
Pair 3	Pink Muhly	Oh Yu-jin	Violet Fragrance (보랏빛 향기)	Kang Susie	62
2nd song	Reed Field	Yoon Ga-yi	Is It Love (사랑일까)	J Rabbit	-
Pair 4	The Insurance of Sinbad	Yu Ho-jin	As I Say (말하는 대로)	Sagging Snail	25
Pair 4	One Thousand And One Nights	K2	As I Say (말하는 대로)	Sagging Snail	74
2nd song	The Insurance of Sinbad	Yu Ho-jin	A Flying Butterfly (나는 나비)	YB	-

Episode 465

Episode 465 was broadcast on September 15, 2024.

Order	Stage Name	Real Name	Song	Original artist	Vote
Round 2
Pair 1	Janggeum-i	Chowon of LIGHTSUM	Ice Flower (얼음꽃)	Ailee	68
Pair 1	Peppermint Candy	Jin-uk	Uphill Road (오르막길)	Yoon Jong-shin ft. Jeong-in	31
Pair 2	Pink Muhly	Oh Yu-jin	The Man in Sinsa-dong (신사동 그 사람)	Joo Hyun-mi	36
Pair 2	One Thousand And One Nights	K2	A Flower That Didn’t Bloom (못다핀 꽃 한송이)	Kim Soo-chul	63
Round 3
Finalists	Janggeum-i	Chowon of LIGHTSUM	Alone (홀로)	Jung Key feat. Kim Na-young	53
Finalists	One Thousand And One Nights	K2	If I Love Again (다시 사랑한다면)	Do Won-kyoung	46
Special	One Thousand And One Nights	K2	So Beautiful It’s Sad (슬프도록 아름다운)	K2	-
Final
Battle	Janggeum-i	Chowon of LIGHTSUM	Previous three songs were used as voting standard		22
Battle	Under The Sea	Hyolyn	Love wins all	IU	77

=== 231st Generation Mask King ===
- Contestants: Lee Jae-jin of (F.T. Island), Flowsik, Park So-ra, So Soo-bin, Kim Chae-hyun of (Kep1er), Nob of (LADYBOUNCE), Chang Hye-jin, Enoch
Episode 466 - 467

Episode 466

Episode 466 was broadcast on September 22, 2024.

Order	Stage Name	Real Name	Song	Original artist	Vote
Round 1
Pair 1	Holding Red Bean	Lee Jae-jin of F.T. Island	I Think I Did (그랬나봐)	Kim Hyung-joong	55
Pair 1	Holding Rice	Flowsik	I Think I Did (그랬나봐)	Kim Hyung-joong	44
2nd song	Holding Rice	Flowsik	One Love Forgotten With Another Love (사랑은 다른 사랑으로 잊혀진다)	Hareem	-
Pair 2	Spider	Park So-ra	Behind You (너의 뒤에서)	Park Jin-young	13
Pair 2	Snail	So Soo-bin	Behind You (너의 뒤에서)	Park Jin-young	86
2nd song	Spider	Park So-ra	I’m a Woman, Too (나도 여자야)	Jang Na-ra	-
Pair 3	Sikhye	Kim Chae-hyun of Kep1er	Valenti	BoA	82
Pair 3	Sujeonggwa	Nob of LADYBOUNCE	Valenti	BoA	17
2nd song	Sujeonggwa	Nob of LADYBOUNCE	Brave Woman (당돌한 여자)	Seo Joo-kyung	-
Pair 4	Voice High As A Dolphin	Chang Hye-jin	I Guess I Loved You (사랑했나봐)	Yoon Do-hyun	19
Pair 4	Voice Deep As A Cave	Enoch	I Guess I Loved You (사랑했나봐)	Yoon Do-hyun	80
2nd song	Voice High As A Dolphin	Chang Hye-jin	Fool of Love (사랑의 바보)	The Nuts	-

Episode 467

Episode 467 was broadcast on September 29, 2024.

Order	Stage Name	Real Name	Song	Original artist	Vote
Opening Special	The Pied Piper	Lee Juck	No More Drinks (술이 싫다)	Lee Juck	-
Round 2
Pair 1	Holding Red Bean	Lee Jae-jin of FT Island	You Were Beautiful (예뻤어)	DAY6	30
Pair 1	Snail	So Soo-bin	Hold the End of This Night (이 밤의 끝을 잡고)	Solid	69
Pair 2	Sikhye	Kim Chae-hyun of Kep1er	I Love You (사랑해요)	Taeyeon	36
Pair 2	Voice Deep As A Cave	Enoch	YOU (늘 그대)	Yang Hee-eun and Sung Si-kyung	63
Round 3
Finalists	Snail	So Soo-bin	After a Long Time (그 후로 오랫동안)	Shin Seung-hun	53
Finalists	Voice Deep As A Cave	Enoch	Reverberation (잔향)	Kim Dong-ryul	46
Final
Battle	Snail	So Soo-bin	Previous three songs were used as voting standard		39
Battle	Under The Sea	Hyolyn	Heavenly Fate (천상연)	CAN	60

=== 232nd Generation Mask King ===
- Contestants: Yeom Yu-ri, Jiana of (YOUNG POSSE), Park Hyun-kyu of (Vromance), An Ba-ul, Lee Eugene, Lee Pil-mo, Ash-B, Park Jun-ha
Episode 468 - 469

Episode 468

Episode 468 was broadcast on October 6, 2024.

Order	Stage Name	Real Name	Song	Original artist	Vote
Round 1
Pair 1	If A Bear Does A Handstand	Yeom Yu-ri	Into The New World (다시 만난 세계)	Girls’ Generation	70
Pair 1	If Milk Falls Sideways	Jiana of YOUNG POSSE	Into The New World (다시 만난 세계)	Girls’ Generation	29
2nd song	If Milk Falls Sideways	Jiana of YOUNG POSSE	Touch My Body	Sistar	-
Pair 2	Tofu	Park Hyun-kyu of Vromance	Festival (축제)	Flower	89
Pair 2	Soy Milk	An Ba-ul	Festival (축제)	Flower	10
2nd song	Soy Milk	An Ba-ul	To The Fool... From A Fool (바보에게... 바보가)	Park Myung-soo	-
Pair 3	Gacha Machine	Lee Eugene	On The Street (거리에서)	Zoo	26
Pair 3	Vending Machine	Lee Pil-mo	On The Street (거리에서)	Zoo	73
2nd song	Gacha Machine	Lee Eugene	We Are (시차)	Woo Won-jae ft. Loco	-
Pair 4	Cry-Baby Princess That Knows How To Party	Ash-B	Hold On (정신 차려)	Kim Soo-chul	29
Pair 4	Handsome Fool General	Park Jun-ha	Hold On (정신 차려)	Kim Soo-chul	70
2nd song	Cry-Baby Princess That Knows How To Party	Ash-B	Who’s Your Mama? (어머니가 누구니)	Park Jin-young	-

Episode 469

Episode 469 was broadcast on October 13, 2024.

Order	Stage Name	Real Name	Song	Original artist	Vote
Round 2
Pair 1	If A Bear Does A Handstand	Yeom Yu-ri	Going Home	Kim Yoon-ah	28
Pair 1	Tofu	Park Hyun-kyu of Vromance	Confession (고백)	Jung Joon-il	71
Pair 2	Vending Machine	Lee Pil-mo	End of the Sea (바다 끝)	Choi Baek-ho	47
Pair 2	Handsome Fool General	Park Jun-ha	So Soon (아니 벌써)	Sanulrim	52
Round 3
Finalists	Tofu	Park Hyun-kyu of Vromance	Please, Please (제발)	Deulgukhwa	82
Finalists	Handsome Fool General	Park Jun-ha	Fire (불놀이야)	Oxen ‘80	17
Special	Handsome Fool General	Park Jun-ha	The Time I First Met You (너를 처음 만난 그때)	Park Jun-ha	-
Final
Battle	Tofu	Park Hyun-kyu of Vromance	Previous three songs were used as voting standard		38
Battle	Under The Sea	Hyolyn	From Here to Eternity (지상에서 영원으로)	Jeong Kyoung-hwa	61

=== 233rd Generation Mask King ===
- Contestants: Hyemi of (Fiestar), Jung Seung-hwan, Moon Su-a of (Billlie), Yonghoon of (ONEWE), Maddox, Dahye, Kang Seong-hee of (Sinchon Blues) , Jeon Won-seok
Episode 470 - 471

Episode 470

Episode 470 was broadcast on October 27, 2024, skipping a week.

Order	Stage Name	Real Name	Song	Original artist	Vote
Round 1
Pair 1	Bridal Shower	Hyemi of Fiestar	In The Bus (버스 안에서)	Zaza	85
Pair 1	Brothers Fighting	Jung Seung-hwan	In The Bus (버스 안에서)	Zaza	14
2nd song	Brothers Fighting	Jung Seung-hwan	Spring Days of My Life (내생에 봄날은)	Can	-
Pair 2	Pancake	Moon Su-a of Billlie	HAPPY	Day6	19
Pair 2	Donut	Yonghoon of ONEWE	HAPPY	Day6	80
2nd song	Pancake	Moon Su-a of Billlie	As Time Goes By (시간이 흐른 뒤)	Yoon Mi-rae	-
Pair 3	Microwave	Maddox	If It Was Me (나였으면)	Na Yoon Kwon	66
Pair 3	Oven	Dahye	If It Was Me (나였으면)	Na Yoon Kwon	33
2nd song	Oven	Dahye	You Are My Everything	Gummy	-
Pair 4	Carnival	Kang Seong-hee of Sinchon Blues	The Letter (편지)	Kim Kwang-jin	71
Pair 4	Tiptoe	Jeon Won-seok	The Letter (편지)	Kim Kwang-jin	28
2nd song	Tiptoe	Jeon Won-seok	Tears Inside Me (내 안의 눈물)	Cha Ho-suk	-

Episode 471

Episode 471 was broadcast on November 3, 2024.

Order	Stage Name	Real Name	Song	Original artist	Vote
Round 2
Pair 1	Bridal Shower	Hyemi of Fiestar	The Fool (이 바보야)	Jung Seung-hwan	14
Pair 1	Donut	Yonghoon of ONEWE	Beautiful Goodbye (사월이 지나면 우리 헤어져요)	Chen	85
Pair 2	Microwave	Maddox	Consolation (위로)	Kim Bum-soo	26
Pair 2	Carnival	Kang Seong-hee of Sinchon Blues	Rainy Season (장마)	Jung-in	73
Round 3
Finalists	Donut	Yonghoon of ONEWE	Our Blues, Our Life (우리들의 블루스)	Lim Young-woong	32
Finalists	Carnival	Kang Seong-hee of Sinchon Blues	Invitation to Me (나에게로의 초대)	Jeong Kyoung-hwa	67
Final
Battle	Carnival	Kang Seong-hee of Sinchon Blues	Previous three songs were used as voting standard		52
Battle	Under The Sea	Hyolyn	Endure... (차마...)	Sung Si-kyung	47

=== 234th Generation Mask King ===
- Contestants: Moon Su-jin, JooE, Vincent of (Crack Shot), Byeol Sa-rang, Sunyoul of (UP10TION), GeniusSKLee, Shim Jin-hwa, Choi Dae-chul
Episode 472 - 473

Episode 472

Episode 472 was broadcast on November 10, 2024.

Order	Stage Name	Real Name	Song	Original artist	Vote
Round 1
Pair 1	Lucky Charm	Moon Su-jin	Did You Forget... (잊었니...)	Yoon Mi-rae	67
Pair 1	Correct Answer Killer	JooE	Did You Forget... (잊었니...)	Yoon Mi-rae	32
2nd song	Correct Answer Killer	JooE	This Fool (이 바보)	Wonder Girls	-
Pair 2	Mudskipper	Vincent of Crack Shot	Love is Like Spring Rain, Breakup is Like Winter Rain (사랑은 봄비처럼 이별은 겨울비처럼)	Lim Hyun-jeong	51
Pair 2	The Youngest Child	Byeol Sa-rang	Love is Like Spring Rain, Breakup is Like Winter Rain (사랑은 봄비처럼 이별은 겨울비처럼)	Lim Hyun-jeong	48
2nd song	The Youngest Child	Byeol Sa-rang	The Day was Beautiful (그때가 좋았어)	Kassy	-
Pair 3	Are You a T?	Sunyoul of UP10TION	With You (그대랑)	Lee Juck	59
Pair 3	Are You an F?	GeniusSKLee	With You (그대랑)	Lee Juck	40
2nd song	Are You an F?	GeniusSKLee	An Old Song (오래된 노래)	Kim Dong-ryul	-
Pair 4	Queen of Tears	Shim Jin-hwa	Even if I Love You (너를 사랑하고도)	Jeon Yu-na	31
Pair 4	King of Soup	Choi Dae-chul	Even if I Love You (너를 사랑하고도)	Jeon Yu-na	68
2nd song	Queen of Tears	Shim Jin-hwa	Rose of Betrayal (배반의 장미)	Uhm Jung-hwa	-

Episode 473

Episode 473 was broadcast on November 17, 2024.

Order	Stage Name	Real Name	Song	Original artist	Vote
Round 2
Pair 1	Lucky Charm	Moon Su-jin	We Used To Love (...사랑했잖아...)	Lyn	45
Pair 1	Mudskipper	Vincent of Crack Shot	Love Beyond This World (세상엔 없는 사랑)	Adam	54
Pair 2	Are You a T?	Sunyoul of UP10TION	The Person That is Me (나란 놈이란)	Im Chang-jung	36
Pair 2	King of Soup	Choi Dae-chul	Foolish Breakup (어리석은 이별)	Jung Jae-wook	63
Round 3
Finalists	Mudskipper	Vincent of Crack Shot	You	Kim Sang-min	60
Finalists	King of Soup	Choi Dae-chul	So You (그래서 그대는)	Yarn	39
Final
Battle	Mudskipper	Vincent of Crack Shot	Previous three songs were used as voting standard		21
Battle	Carnival	Kang Seong-hee of Sinchon Blues	Everyone (여러분)	Yoon Bok-hee	78

=== 235th Generation Mask King ===
- Contestants: Cheeze, Jambino, Emma of (BADVILLAIN), Jay Chang of (ONE PACT), Jeong Da-eun, Dara of (2NE1), MMMN, Hwang Gun-ha of (RabidAnce)
Episode 474 - 475

Episode 474

Episode 474 was broadcast on November 24, 2024.

Order	Stage Name	Real Name	Song	Original artist	Vote
Round 1
Pair 1	Kickboard	Cheeze	Your Shampoo Scent in the Flowers (흔들리는 꽃들 속에서 네 샴푸향이 느껴진거야)	Jang Beom-june	51
Pair 1	Keyboard	Jambino	Your Shampoo Scent in the Flowers (흔들리는 꽃들 속에서 네 샴푸향이 느껴진거야)	Jang Beom-june	48
2nd song	Keyboard	Jambino	How Sweet	NewJeans	-
Pair 2	Luminescent-Haired Anne	Emma of BADVILLAIN	Day by Day (하루하루)	Tashannie	28
Pair 2	Blue-Haired Man	Jay Chang of ONE PACT	Day by Day (하루하루)	Tashannie	71
2nd song	Luminescent-Haired Anne	Emma of BADVILLAIN	NO ONE (누구 없소)	Lee Hi feat. B.I	-
Pair 3	Mood-Setting Lantern	Jeong Da-eun	Desire and Hope (원하고 원망하죠)	As One	11
Pair 3	Criminal-Catching Flashlight	Dara of 2NE1	Desire and Hope (원하고 원망하죠)	As One	88
2nd song	Mood-Setting Lantern	Jeong Da-eun	Scent of Time (시간의 향기)	Kang Susie	-
Pair 4	Baked Potato	MMMN	Old Song (오래된 노래)	Standing Egg	11
Pair 4	Tornado Potato	Hwang Gun-ha of RabidAnce	Old Song (오래된 노래)	Standing Egg	88
2nd song	Baked Potato	MMMN	The Road to Me (내게 오는 길)	Sung Si-kyung	-

Episode 475

Episode 475 was broadcast on December 1, 2024.

Order	Stage Name	Real Name	Song	Original artist	Vote
Round 2
Pair 1	Kickboard	Cheeze	Fry’s Dream (후라이의 꿈)	AKMU	26
Pair 1	Blue-Haired Man	Jay Chang of ONE PACT	DARLING	Taeyang	73
Pair 2	Criminal-Catching Flashlight	Dara of 2NE1	Beginning (시작)	Park Ki-young	45
Pair 2	Tornado Potato	Hwang Gun-ha of RabidAnce	Song of the Wind (바람의 노래)	Cho Yong-pil	54
Round 3
Finalists	Blue-Haired Man	Jay Chang of ONE PACT	Miracles in December (12월의 기적)	EXO	50
Finalists	Tornado Potato	Hwang Gun-ha of RabidAnce	Nocturn (녹턴)	Lee Eun-mi	49
Final
Battle	Blue-Haired Man	Jay Chang of ONE PACT	Previous three songs were used as voting standard		26
Battle	Carnival	Kang Seong-hee of Sinchon Blues	It’s Only My World (그것만이 내 세상)	Jeon In-kwon	73

=== 236th Generation Mask King ===
- Contestants: nov, Jin Jung-sun, Stephanie, Jang Ho-jun, Ryu Ji-ho of (OWALLOIL), Seo Sung-hyuk of (TAN), Xiyeon, Jung Joon-il
Episode 476 - 477

Episode 476

Episode 476 was broadcast on December 15, 2024, skipping a week.

Order	Stage Name	Real Name	Song	Original artist	Vote
Round 1
Pair 1	Do You Want To Walk With Me?	nov	Propose (고백)	Hot Potato	92
Pair 1	Do You Want To Listen With Me?	Jin Jung-sun	Propose (고백)	Hot Potato	7
2nd song	Do You Want To Listen With Me?	Jin Jung-sun	Hey Hey Hey	Jaurim	-
Pair 2	Pumpkin Sweet Potato	Stephanie	Met You by Chance (어쩌다 마주친 그대)	Songgolmae	92
Pair 2	Do You Know What Crab Even Tastes Like?	Jang Ho-jun	Met You by Chance (어쩌다 마주친 그대)	Songgolmae	7
2nd song	Do You Know What Crab Even Tastes Like?	Jang Ho-jun	Like That Strong Salmons Which Swim up Rivers (거꾸로 강을 거슬러 오르는 저 힘찬 연어들처럼)	Kang San-eh	-
Pair 3	Steam Iron	Ryu Ji-ho of OWALLOIL	Magic Castle (마법의 성)	The Classic	33
Pair 3	Coin Laundry	Seo Sung-hyuk of TAN	Magic Castle (마법의 성)	The Classic	66
2nd song	Steam Iron	Ryu Ji-ho of OWALLOIL	Iguana (이구아나)	Kang San-eh	-
Pair 4	Interpretation Of The Dream Over The Dream Itself	Xiyeon	If it is You (너였다면)	Jung Seung-hwan	14
Pair 4	Perfume Over Flowers	Jung Joon-il	If it is You (너였다면)	Jung Seung-hwan	85
2nd song	Interpretation Of The Dream Over The Dream Itself	Xiyeon	It Was Love (사랑이었다)	Zico ft. Luna of (f(x))	-

Episode 477

Episode 477 was broadcast on December 22, 2024.

Order	Stage Name	Real Name	Song	Original artist	Vote
Round 2
Pair 1	Do You Want To Walk With Me?	nov	In Color (물들어)	BMK	36
Pair 1	Pumpkin Sweet Potato	Stephanie	Childish Adult (어른아이)	Gummy	63
Pair 2	Coin Laundry	Seo Sung-hyuk of TAN	After Love (후애)	M.N.J	14
Pair 2	Perfume Over Flowers	Jung Joon-il	Reply (답장)	Kim Dong-ryul	85
Round 3
Finalists	Pumpkin Sweet Potato	Stephanie	Magic Carpet Ride (매직 카펫 라이드)	Jaurim	18
Finalists	Perfume Over Flowers	Jung Joon-il	The Wind is Blowing (바람이 분다)	Lee So-ra	81
Final
Battle	Perfume Over Flowers	Jung Joon-il	Previous three songs were used as voting standard		59
Battle	Carnival	Kang Seong-hee of Sinchon Blues	Love Has Gone (사랑했지만)	Kim Kwang-seok	40
