= Jung Eui-yoon =

South Korean baseball player (born 1986)

- Born: July 25, 1986 (age 39); Busan
- Bats: Right Throws: Right

KBO debut
- April 2, 2005, for the LG Twins

KBO statistics (through August 1, 2019)
- Batting average: .282
- Hits: 1,018
- Home runs: 107
- RBI: 507
- Stats at Baseball Reference

Teams
- LG Twins (2005–2015); SK Wyverns / SSG Landers (2015–present)

- Jung Eui-yoon
- Hangul: 정의윤
- Hanja: 鄭義潤
- RR: Jeong Uiyun
- MR: Chŏng Ŭiyun
- IPA: [t͡ɕʌ̹ŋ.ɰijun]

Jung Eui-yoon (Korean: 정의윤; born July 25, 1986) is a South Korean professional baseball player. He played in the KBO League as an outfielder for the SSG Landers.

== Personal life ==
Jung and his at-the-time girlfriend, Lee Ha-yana had a daughter in September 2017. He and Lee married on December 3, 2017.

== Professional career ==
Jung was drafted in the 2nd round by the LG Twins.

He was traded to the SK Wyverns in 2015.

Jung chose to stay with the Wyverns after becoming a free agent in 2017.

On October 31, 2021, Jung was released from the Landers.
