= Kim Yon-ja =

South Korean singer (born 1959)

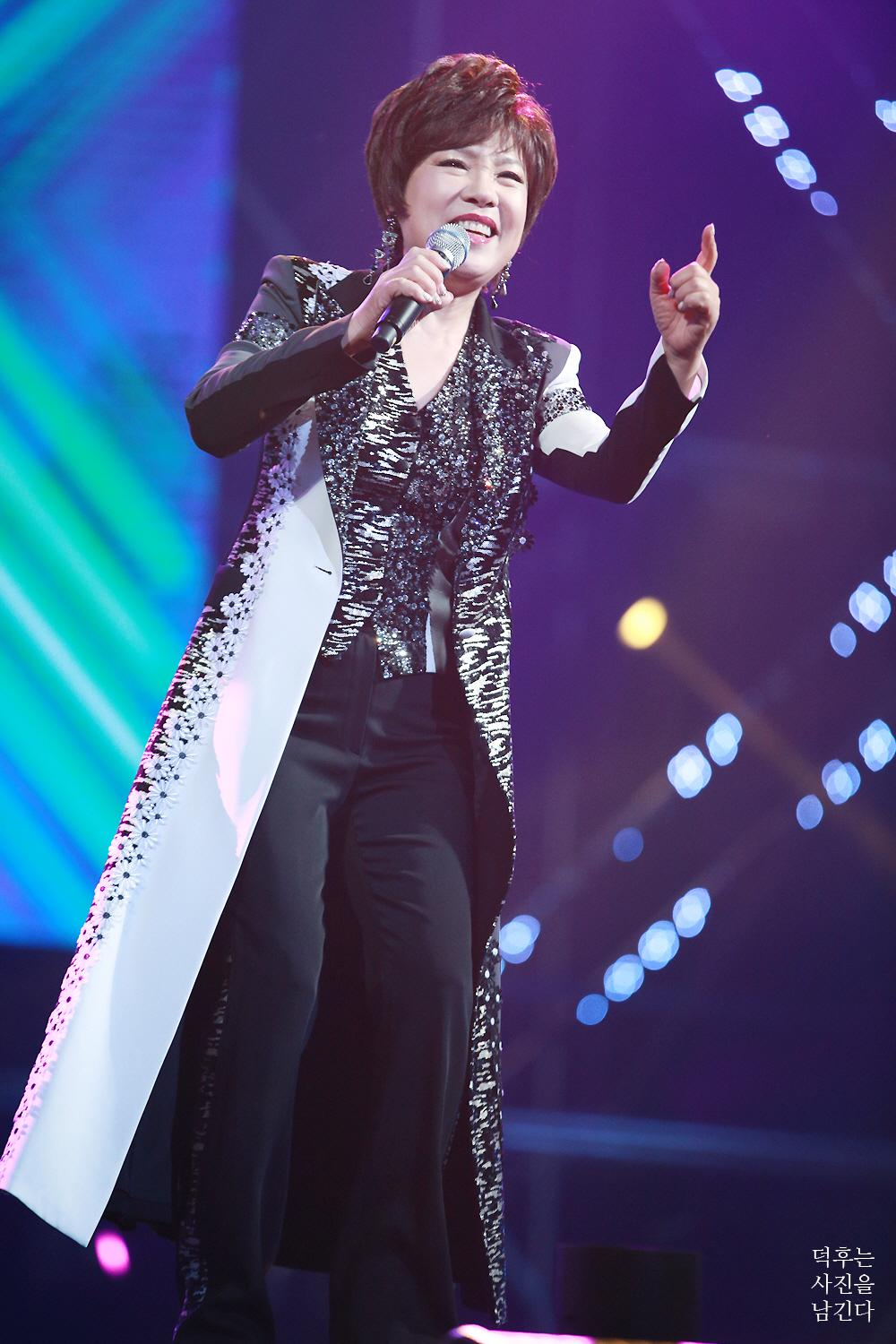

Background information
- Born: Kim Yon-ja; January 25, 1959 (age 67); Gwangju, South Korea
- Genres: Trot
- Occupation: Singer
- Years active: 1974–present

Korean name
- Hangul: 김연자
- Hanja: 金蓮子
- RR: Gim Yeonja
- MR: Kim Yŏnja

Kim Yon-ja (Korean: 김연자; Hanja: 金蓮子; born January 25, 1959) is a South Korean singer. She is considered a pioneer of Korean music abroad, having launched a successful career in Japan in the 1980s, where she is known as "the empress of enka."

== Biography ==
The daughter of a barber in Gwangju, Kim was encouraged by her father to follow her passion for music and, on her way to Seoul, won the TBC National Song Rookie Star Show in 1974, debuting that same year under Oasis Records with the song Tell Me composed by Kim Hak-song. Three years later she moved to Japan, but did not find success and returned to her homeland. She rose to prominence in 1981 with the album Bouquet of Songs, which sold 3.6 million copies, which was followed by the hit songs Is It Really (진정인가요) in 1982 and Mercury Lamp (수은등) in 1984. By the mid-1980s she had performed in the United States, Canada, and Europe.[5] In 1988, Kim moved with her husband Kim Ho-sik, a Korean-Japanese businessman, to Tokyo. After singing the song In the Land of the Morning (아침의 나라에서) at the closing ceremony of the 1984 Summer Olympics, she made a Japanese version of it, which got her career off the ground and was followed by numerous successful albums and invitations to perform abroad. In 1989, she performed in São Paulo and the following year on the island of Sakhalin in front of 10,000 people.

In the early 1990s, Kim released three to four albums a year, touring Japan and singing at charity events not only in the country, where she collected donations for victims of the 1993 Unzen volcano eruption and the Great Hanshin earthquake, but also in Korea. In April 2001, she performed in Pyongyang for Kim Il Sung's birth celebration.

Kim resided in Japan for nearly 30 years from 1982 to 2012, when she returned to her native South Korea at the end of her marriage.
