= Korea Times Music Festival =

Annual K-pop festival in Los Angeles

Coordinates: 34°06′46″N 118°20′20″W

- The logo for the Korean Music Festival prior to 2013.
- Genre: K-pop
- Locations: Los Angeles, United States
- Years active: 2003–2019
- Website: ktmf.koreatimes.com

The Korea Times Music Festival (originally titled Korean Music Festival until 2013) is an annual event held at the Hollywood Bowl in the United States. Featuring artists from South Korea's K-pop music industry, the organizers describe it as one of the largest music festivals held in Southern California.

The festival was founded and organized by The Korea Times to give Korean Americans residing in southern California an opportunity to stay in touch with Korean culture. The first festival in 2003 was 'in celebration of the centennial anniversary of the Korean immigration to the United States'.

== Attendance figures ==
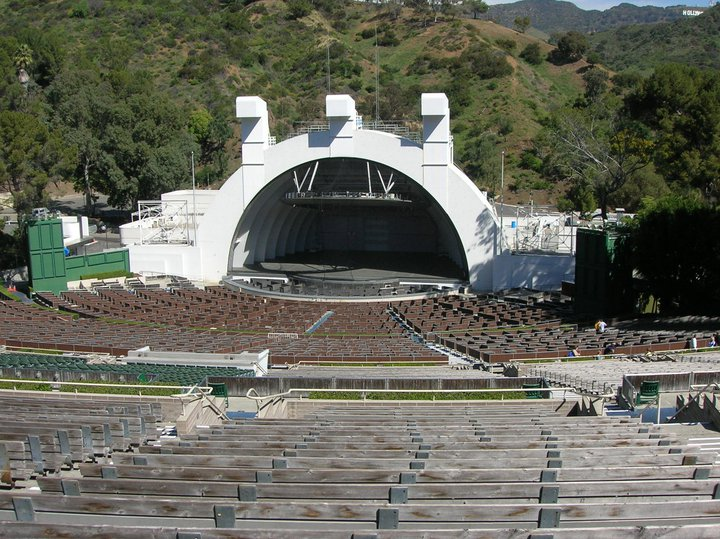
The Hollywood Bowl - venue of the annual Korean Music Festival

The inaugural concert in 2003 sold out 18,000 seats within 14 days and subsequent shows in the following years have also sold out; organizers noted that the number of non-Koreans attending the music festival has increased substantially. According to The Korea Times, about 95 percent of the tickets sold in 2008 were purchased by non-Koreans, with many fans coming from all around the United States as well as from other Asian and European countries to attend the concert.

== Timeline ==
=== 2003 ===
The 1st Korean Music Festival was held in 2003.

Artists (17 total):
- YB
- Shin Seung-hun
- Patti Kim
- Camilla
- g.o.d
- BoA
- Tae Jin-ah
- Joo Hyun-Mi
- Lee Sun-hee
- Jang Na-ra
- Sung Si-kyung
- Can
- Wax
- Park Jin-young (JYP)
- Kim Dong-kyu
- Kim Young-mi
- Lim Hyung-joo
- Crenshaw Elite Choir

MC:

- You Jung-hyun
- Jung Ji-hyun

=== 2004 ===
The 2nd Korean Music Festival was held on October 16, 2004.

Artists (21 total):

- Rain
- Seven
- Shinhwa
- DBSK
- Lexy
- Wheesung
- Eun Ji-won
- Big Mama King (BMK)
- Han Kyung-il
- Kim Jong-kook
- Jeong Soo-ra
- Kim Jong-hwan
- Tae Jin-ah
- Chul Hyun
- Song Dae-kwan
- Hyun Sook
- Kim Dong-kyu
- Keum Joo-hee
- Love & Peace
- Crenshaw Elite Choir
- MBC Pops Orchestra

MC:

- Park Soo-hong
- Lee Hyo-ri

=== 2005 ===
The 3rd Korean Music Festival was held on April 23, 2005.

Artists (13 total):

- NRG
- Rumble Fish
- Mýa
- Hong Kyung-min
- Wheesung
- Seven
- Lee Soo-young
- Chae Yeon
- Rain
- Sonnie
- Kim Gun-mo
- Gummy
- Park Jin-young (JYP)

MC:

- Ock Joo-hyun
- You Jung-hyun

=== 2006 ===
The 4th Korean Music Festival was held on May 20, 2006,

Artists (22 total):

- Seven
- Lee Hyori
- SS501
- SG Wannabe
- Epik High
- Dynamic Duo
- Psy
- Clon
- Lee Seung-gi
- DJ DOC
- Eru
- Im Tae Kyung
- Lee Eun-mi
- Kim Jang-hoon
- Shin Seung-hun
- Lee Sun-hee
- Lee Soo-young
- Tae Jin-ah

Comedians:

- Go Hye-sung
- Kang Il-goo

Guest Appearance by:

- Jang Dong-gun
- Lee Jung-jae

MC:

- Ock Joo-hyun
- Kim Yong-man

Theme: World Cup Soccer

=== 2007 ===
The 5th Korean Music Festival was held on May 5, 2007,

Artists (18 total):

- Super Junior (10 of the 13 members attended)
- Baek Ji-young
- Epik High
- Eru
- Yang Hee-eun (양희은)
- Yoon Hyung-joo (윤형주)
- Kim Se-hwan (김세환)
- Song Dae-kwan
- Lee Eun-mi (이은미)
- Tae Jin-ah
- Fly to the Sky
- Big Bang
- Choi Jin-hee (최진희)
- Lim Jeong-hee
- Choi Hyun-soo (최현수)
- Seo Ji-young
- BoA
- Ivy

MC:

- Eugene
- Brian Joo

Theme: We Are One

=== 2008 ===
The 6th Korean Music Festival was held on May 17, 2008,

Artists (15 total):

- Lee Min-woo (Shinhwa)
- Moon Hee-joon (H.O.T)
- Chae Yeon
- TVXQ
- Super Junior-T
- Girls' Generation (SNSD)
- Fly to the Sky
- SG Wannabe
- Son Hoyoung
- Ock Joo-hyun
- Shin Jung-hyeon
- Yoon Hyung-ju
- Kim Se-hwan
- Choi Baek-ho
- Jung Hoon-hee

MC:

- Brian Joo
- Ock Joo-hyun

=== 2009 ===
The 7th Korean Music Festival was held on May 9, 2009,

Artists (14 total):

- Girls' Generation (SNSD)
- Lee Juck
- Lena Park
- Kim Changwan Band
- Son Hoyoung
- SHINee
- Spring, Summer, Fall, Winter
- Kim Heung-gook
- Tae Jin-ah
- Um Jung-haeng
- Kim Tae-woo
- Baek Ji-young
- SS501 (all five members)
- Min Hae-kyung

MC:

- Son Hoyoung

=== 2010 ===
Korean Music Festival 8 was held on May 1, 2010.

Artists (13 total):

- Wonder Girls
- 2PM
- Choi Sung-soo
- Leessang
- Kim Jong-kook
- Yoon Soo-il
- Kim Yun-ja
- Joo Hyun-mi
- Kara
- Lee Eun-mi
- Beast
- Yoon Bok-hee
- Yoon Han-gi

MC:

- Haha
- Nicole Jung

=== 2011 ===
Korean Music Festival 9 was held on April 30, 2011.

Artists (16 total):

- 4minute
- Baek Ji-young
- Bobby Kim
- DJ DOC
- G.NA
- Jay Park
- Jeon Young-rok
- Jeong Soo-ra
- K.will
- Kim Jang-hoon
- Lee Eun-ha
- Secret
- Sistar
- Song So-hee
- Seol Woon-do
- U-KISS

MC:

- G.NA
- Kim Chang-yeol

=== 2012 ===
Korean Music Festival 10 was held on April 28, 2012.

Artists (11 total):

- Nam Jin
- Love & Peace
- Lena Park
- Bobby Kim & The Buga Kingz
- Kim Kyung-ho
- Brown Eyed Girls
- MBLAQ
- Arirang
- g.o.d

MC:

- Son Ho-young
- Narsha

=== 2013 ===
The Korea Times Music Festival 11 was held on April 27, 2013. This was the festival's first year under its present name.

Artists (13 total):

- YB
- Big Mama King (BMK)
- Guckkasten
- Heyee
- Im Tae Kyung
- Kim Bum-ryong
- Oh Jung-hae
- Jewelry
- ZE:A
- Blush
- Beast
- BtoB
- Haha and Skull

MC:

- Haha

=== 2014 ===
The 12th Korea Times Music Festival was held on May 3, 2014.

Artists (13 total):
- 2AM
- Crayon Pop
- Dal Shabet
- Ulala Session
- Insooni
- B1A4
- Kim Jong-seo
- Shim Soo-bong
- Chung Dong-ha
- Ali
- EXO-M
- Ta'en
- Yoon Bok-hee

MC:

- Park Jae-min

=== 2015 ===
The 13th Korea Times Music Festival was held on May 2, 2015.

Artists (11 total):
- EXID
- Apink
- Im Tae-kyung
- Bada
- TVXQ
- Oh Seung-geun
- Kim Bum-soo
- Cool
- Kim Yon-ja
- Kim Soo-hee
- Got7

MC:

- Heejun Han

=== 2016 ===
The 14th Korea Times Music Festival was held on May 7, 2016.

Artists (15 total)

- Shinee
- Nanta
- Yoon Mi-rae, Tiger JK and Bizzy (MFBTY)
- Shin Youngok
- Miljenko Matijevic
- Red Velvet
- Han Young-ae (한영애)
- F.T. Island
- Lee Aeran (이애란)
- Wax
- The Barberettes
- AOA
- Wheesung
- Poppin Hyun-joon & Park Aeri

MC:

- Jenny Jo
- Heejun Han

=== 2017 ===
The 15th Korea Times Music Festival was held on April 29, 2017.

Artists (12 total)

- Bastarz
- Gummy
- Skull & Haha
- Min Kyung-hoon
- Chu Ga-yeoul
- Cho Hang-jo
- Kim Yeong-im
- Victon
- Apink
- NCT 127
- DJ Doc
- Tiffany

MC:

- Tiffany
- Haha

=== 2018 ===
The 16th Korea Times Music Festival was held on April 28, 2018.

Artists (12 total)

- Rain
- Kim Bum-soo
- Red Velvet
- NCT 127
- Rose Motel
- Jinjo Crew
- John Park
- EXID
- BtoB
- Baek Ji-young
- Chu Ga-yeoul
- Lee Eun-mi
- Park Hyun-bin

=== 2019 ===
The 17th Korea Times Music Festival was held on April 27, 2019. The event was hosted by Kim Young-chul and Kei.

Artists:

- Lovelyz
- Ha Sung-woon
- Yook Joong-wan
- Kang Jun-woo
- Choi Jin-hee
- Super Junior
- Kang Hye-jung
- Choi Won-hyun
- Tae Jin-ah
- Kim Bum-soo
- Jung Eun-ji
- Taemin
- DJ DOC
