= Dalpalan =

South Korean composer and music director (born 1966)

- Born: Kang Ki-young; 16 July 1966 (age 60); Seoul, South Korea
- Occupations: DJ; film score composer; music director; record producer
- Years active: 1986–present
- Musical career
- Genres: Heavy metal; punk rock; alternative rock; tech house; independent music
- Instruments: Bass; DJ equipment
- Member of: Pitch Present
- Formerly of: Little Sky; Sinawe; H_{2}O; Pipi Band Band; Pipi Long Stocking; Mozosonyon

Korean name
- Hangul: 강기영
- RR: Gang Giyeong
- MR: Kang Kiyŏng

Professional name
- Hangul: 달파란
- RR: Dalparan
- MR: Talp'aran

Kang Ki-young (born 16 July 1966), known professionally as Dalpalan, is a South Korean film score composer and music director. He was a first-generation Korean heavy metal and electronic musician and a former member of the bands Sinawe, H_{2}O and Pipi Band.

He began making film music in 1997 with the film "Bad Movie" and made his full-fledged debut two years later with the film "Lies" (1999). In 2002, Dalparan, Jang Young-gyu, Bang Jun-seok, and Lee Byeong-hoon established the film music group "Pitch Present." Dalparan frequently collaborates with musician Jang Young-gyu, a fellow member of Pitch Present, on several film scores, including A Bittersweet Life (2005), The Good, the Bad, the Weird (2008), The Front Line (2011), The Thieves (2012), Assassination (2015), and The Wailing (2016). As music director he is also known for his work in the film Vanishing Time: A Boy Who Returned (2017), Believer (2018), Samjin Company English Class (2019), and Phantom (2023).

== Early life ==
Dalpalan was born on 16 July 1966 as Kang Ki-young in Seoul. He attended Yongsan High School. In high school, he became close friends with Shin Dae-cheol, son of the legendary singer-songwriter Shin Joong-hyun.

== Career ==
=== Early career as band musician ===
After graduating from high school, Kang Ki-young started his music career as a bassist for the band Little Sky (1986) with Lee Ho-gyu, Lee Geun-hyung, and Kim Jong-seo. Kang then joined the heavy metal band Sinawe with Shin Dae-cheol (guitar), Kim Jong-seo, and Kim Min-ki. He left during the recording of their first album, but later returned for their second.

He then formed the band H_{2}O with Kim Min-gi (drums) and Park Hyun-jun (guitar) and did first album Don't Worry. He worked on the second and third albums of H_{2}O, which had an alternative genre. He stopped promoting with H_{2}O in 1993 as he no longer found rock music appealing. He expressed concerns about the authoritarian spirit of rock. In 1994, he spent a year in Paris, France to relax and pursue painting. It was during this time that he discovered techno music, which was booming in Europe. He realized that he could become disconnected from the international music scene if he didn't adapt to the changing trends.

After coming home to Korea, in 1995, Dalpalan formed the neo-punk a Pipi Band with guitarist Park Hyeon-joon, whom he met at H_{2}O, and experimented with punk music. The vocalist they discovered, Lee Yoon-jeong, immediately drew attention with her singing style and her unique fashion style and free-spiritedness reminiscent of Pippi Longstocking.

After Lee Yoon-jeong's departure, the band changed its name to "Pippi Long Stocking with Goguma (Kwon Byeong-jun)" and continued performing. However, their unconventional actions, such as stopping performances and spitting at a camera during a live music ranking program, led to a ban from future appearances. The band eventually disbanded. Despite their short-lived existence, Pippi Long Stocking's musical experiments had a lasting impact on the culture of the time, introducing punk to a music industry dominated by ballads and dance music, incorporating techno into songs such as 'Strawberry'. It was contributing to the emergence of an indie scene.

=== Techno and film music ===
In late 1997, Kang Ki-young became deeply engaged with techno music. At that time, there were only around a dozen DJs active in the Hongdae area, most of whom were either night club DJs or rock cafe DJs, excluding those focused on hip-hop. Around this same period, techno DJs began to emerge, with musicians gradually getting involved in the scene casually for enjoyment. Prior to this, he had considered trying his hand at DJing and ultimately decided to pursue it. He selected the stage name 'Dalparan,' which derives from 'blue moon' in Korean, reversing the order of the words to create a more melodic-sounding name in the Korean language.

The domestic techno scene was lacking in the late 1990s. Techno clubs near Hongik University were not established, and even Korea's largest PC communication techno club, '21st Century Groove' (Hitel), only had a few visitors each day. The first techno performance at 'Master Plan' near Hongik University in late 1997 was met with criticism from attendees who found the repetitive beats without lyrics unappealing. Dalparan experienced the challenges of the underground scene firsthand, realizing the difficulties of being a pioneer in a market with few consumers and no institutional support. Dalparan emphasized the need for collaboration between different music scenes, but lamented the lack of opportunities for emerging artists due to limited genre representation on mainstream media like TV.

At the same time, Dalparan ventured into film music with the guidance of director Jang Sun-woo. Novelist Kim Yeon-su recommended Pippi Band's music to senior writer Jang Jeong-il, which inspired director Jang Sun-woo to create a film based on one of the songs from Pippi Band's second album, 'Incomplete Operation,' the following year. The film Bad Movie, featuring music by Dalparan, garnered significant attention and marked the growing recognition of music directors in the Korean film industry.

In 1998, Dalparan released what is considered the first techno solo album to come out of Korea, titled 'Whistle Star'. The album features an authentic techno sound, with minimal use of lyrics and a predominance of repetitive, mechanical-sounding elements that create a dreamy, atmospheric quality.

Subsequently, Dalparan made his official debut as a music director with Jang Sun-woo's Lies in 1999. As a 'techno evangelist,' Dalparan incorporated techno music into his debut film.

In 2000, Dalparan founded the film music group "Peach Project" (복숭아 프로젝트) with fellow musicians Bang Jun-seok from You&Me Blue, Jang Young-gyu from Fisherman Project and Inalchi, and Lee Byung-hoon from the synth-pop band Lizard. Peach Project was a kind of loose community brought together by their shared interests. Gradually, the Peach Project began to gain recognition in the film industry, as this was a time when Korean films were entering a revival period.

In 2002, a planner named Jang Min-seung proposed a meeting with them. Together, they created a unique music space in Gimpo and established the film music company "Peach Present" (복숭아 프레젠트).

In 2005, He worked with Jang Young-gyu as music directors for Kim Jee-woon's film A Bittersweet Life (2005).

In 2007, Pippi Band's first album, "Cultural Revolution," was selected as the 51st in the top 100 Korean popular music albums by Kyunghyang Shinmun and the music-specialized webzine 'Heart Network.' Most of the tones used in his techno music are psychedelic, and he often uses sharp and aggressive tones on expensive vintage electronic instruments such as Waldorf and Roland TB-303.

In 2009, Techno music finally gained popularity in Korea. Techno DJ 'Dalparan' played a key role in transforming techno, a once vague concept, into familiar music. As a leading member of 'Aurasoma', a DJ group known for techno parties, Dalparan also opened a techno club called '108' near Hongik University and hosted a release party for 'techno@kr', a compilation album featuring techno tracks by emerging artists.

In 2012, he co-produced Kim C's solo album 'Priority'.

In 2015, The Pippi Band reunited to celebrate their 20th anniversary with the release of EP album "Pppb". Their former manager, now a prominent figure in pop music, proposed releasing an album to mark the occasion.

In 2016, Dalparan and Jang Young-gyu participated in the exhibition Delusion Earth with sound work. He also served as judge for the 'World Music Film Trends' section of the international competition section of the 12th Jecheon International Music and Film Festival.

Although he participated in some of the music for the SBS drama Big Issue in 2019, Mine is the first time he has overseen the overall music for a drama. Followed by Kingdom Season 2.

In 2020, Bang Jun-seok, Kim Tae-seong, and Dalparan joined The Audio Cinema Series (planned by Studio N).

In 2021, Dalparan, who created Samjin Company English Class OST with the atmosphere of the 90s, including electronic music, techno, and disco, from the opening to the ending, received a music award in Blue Dragon Film Awards.

== Discography ==
=== Albums ===
- 1987 Sinawi 2nd album "Down And Up"
- 1991 H2O 2nd album "Don't worry"
- 1993 H2O 3rd album "Today I"
- 1995 Pippi Band 1st album "Cultural Revolution [문화혁명]"
- 1996 Pippi Band's 2nd album "Impossible Mission [불가능한 작전]"
- 1996 Pippi Band Remake "Red Bean Fish Buns [붕어빵]"
- 1997 Pippi Longstocking 3rd album "One Way Ticket [원웨이 티켓]"
- 1998 Dalparan 1st album "Whistle Star"
- 2001 Toy Elephant Monk "A fairy tale book"
- 2004 Dalparan & Byeongjun 1st album "Imitation Boy"
- 2004 Pippi Longstocking "The Complete Best [삐삐밴드 삐삐롱스타킹 The Complete Best]"
- 2015 Pippi Band 20th anniversary EP album "Pppb"

=== Singles ===
- 1997 Pippi Longstocking "The Fool Bus"

=== Contributions ===
- 1997 Lunchbox Commandos 1st album 《Delicious Omnibus Lunchbox Commandos》
- 2002 《A New World of Music Invited by Yoo Hee-yeol》 (11. Rain)
- 2005 《Korean Traditional Music Festival Commemorative Album》 (10. 2005 Kwaejinachingchingnane)
- 2005 《Eastronika Episode.1》 (15. Love)

== Scores ==
=== Short film ===
Short film credits
Year	Title		Notes
Year	English	Original	Notes
2002	Cowardly Vicious	겁쟁이들이 더 흉폭하다	
2004	Three... Extremes	쓰리, 몬스터	
2006	Fangs	송곳니	
2006	Goodbye Children	굿바이 칠드런	
2011	Dream the Good Dream	좋은 꿈 꾸세요	

=== Feature film ===
Film credits
Year	Title		Notes
Year	English	Original	Notes
1997	Bad Movie	나쁜 영화	with Jung Jae-il
1998	The Cut Runs Deep		
1999	Lies	거짓말	
2002	Resurrection of the Little Match Girl	성냥팔이 소녀의 재림	
2002	The Coast Guard	해안선	Music Department
2002	A Bizarre Love Triangle	철없는 아내와 파란만장한 남편, 그리고 태권소녀	Music Department
2004	R-Point	알 포인트	
2005	A Bittersweet Life	달콤한 인생	
2005	Boy Goes to Heaven	소년, 천국에 가다	
2005	The Aggressives	태풍태양	
2006	The Fox Family	구미호 가족	
2006	Les Formidables		
2006	Tazza: The High Rollers	타짜	
2006	Dasepo Naughty Girls	다세포 소녀	
2007	Love Exposure		
2008	Like Father, Like Son		Music Department
2008	The Good, the Bad, the Weird	좋은 놈, 나쁜 놈, 이상한 놈	
2008	Antique	서양 골동 양과자점 앤티크	
2008	Crush and Blush	미쓰 홍당무	
2009	A Million	10억	
2010	Foxy Festival	구미호 가족	
2010	The Yellow Sea	황해	music dept.
2011	The Front Line	고지전	
2011	Quick	퀵	
2011	Moby Dick		
2011	Countdown	카운트다운	
2012	The Thieves	도둑들	
2012	Dangerously Excited	나는 공무원이다	
2013	Man on the Edge	박수건달	
2013	Cold Eyes	감시자들	
2013	Secretly, Greatly	은밀하게 위대하게	
2013	South Bound	남쪽으로 튀어	
2014	For the Emperor	황제를 위하여	
2014	My Ordinary Love Story	내 연애의 기억	
2015	The Silenced	경성학교: 사라진 소녀들	
2015	Assassination	암살	
2016	The Wailing	곡성	
2016	Vanishing Time: A Boy Who Returned	가려진 시간	
2016	The Sound of Memories		
2016	Yourself and Yours	당신자신과 당신의 것)	
2016	Master	마스터	
2017	Claire's Camera	클레어의 카메라	
2018	The Accidental Detective 2: In Action	탐정: 리턴즈	
2018	Love+Sling	레슬러	
2018	Believer	독전	
2018	Door Lock	킬링 로맨스	
2018	Hotel by the River	강변 호텔	
2020	Samjin Company English Class	삼진그룹 영어토익반	
2020	Collectors	도굴	
2020	The Call	콜	
2022	Gentleman	젠틀맨	
2023	Phantom	유령	
2023	Killing Romance	킬링 로맨스	
2023	Brave Citizen	용감한 시민	

=== Television ===
Series credits
Year	Title		Notes
Year	English	Original	Notes
2020	Kingdom Season 2	킹덤	
2021	Kingdom Ashin of the North	킹덤	
2021	Mine	마인	
2021	Secret Royal Inspector & Joy	어사와 조이	
2023	See You in My 19th Life	이번 생도 잘 부탁해	
2024	Moving	무빙	
2025	Romantics Anonymous	匿名の恋人たち	
2025	Mercy for None	광장	
2025	Aema	애마	
2025	Tempest	북극성	With Jung Jae-il
2025	Typhoon Family	태풍상사	
2026	Phantom Lawyer	신이랑 법률사무소	
2026	Mad Concrete Dreams	대한민국에서 건물주 되는 법	
2026	Soul Mate	ソウルメイト	
2026	The Ordinary Jackpot	로또 1등도 출근합니다	

== Accolades ==
=== Awards and nominations ===
Awards and nominations
Year	Award	Category	Nominated work	Result	Ref.
1999	1999 Mnet Video Music Awards	Best Indie Performance	"Invitation from Whistle Star" (휘파람별의 초대)	Nominated	
2001	Best Music	1st Korean Film Awards	Resurrection of the Little Match Girl	Nominated	
2005	25th Korean Association of Film Critics Awards	Best Music	A Bittersweet Life	Won	
2005	26th Blue Dragon Film Awards	Best Music	A Bittersweet Life	Nominated	
2005	42nd Grand Bell Awards	Best Music	A Bittersweet Life	Nominated	
2005	4th Korean Film Awards	Best Music	A Bittersweet Life	Nominated	
2005	Sitges Film Festival	Best Original Soundtrack	A Bittersweet Life	Won	
2006	Korean Popular Music Awards	2006 Movie Drama Music of the Year	A Bittersweet Life	Won	
2008	29th Blue Dragon Film Awards	Best Music	The Good, the Bad, the Weird	Nominated	
2008	17th Buil Film Awards	Best Music	The Good, the Bad, the Weird	Nominated	
2009	3rd Asian Film Awards	Best Composer	The Good, the Bad, the Weird	Nominated	
2011	32nd Blue Dragon Film Awards	Best Music	The Front Line	Nominated	
2013	34th Blue Dragon Film Awards	Best Music	Cold Eyes	Nominated	
2015	24th Buil Film Awards	Best Music	The Silenced	Nominated	
2015	36th Blue Dragon Film Awards	Best Music	Assassination	Nominated	
2015	52nd Grand Bell Awards	Best Music	Assassination	Nominated	
2016	25th Buil Film Awards	Best Music	The Wailing	Nominated	
2016	37th Blue Dragon Film Awards	Best Music	The Wailing	Won	
2017	54th Grand Bell Awards	Best Music	Vanishing Time: A Boy Who Returned	Won	
2017	22nd Chunsa Film Art Awards	Technical Award (music)	The Wailing	Nominated	
2018	27th Buil Film Awards	Best Music	Believer	Nominated	
2018	55th Grand Bell Awards	Best Music	Believer	Nominated	
2018	39th Blue Dragon Film Awards	Best Music	Believer	Won	
2019	JIMFF Awards hosted by the 15th Jecheon International Music and Film Festival	Best Music	Believer	Won	
2019	28th Buil Film Awards	Best Music	Hotel by the River	Nominated	
2021	41st Blue Dragon Film Awards	Best Music	Samjin Company English Class	Won	
2021	30th Buil Film Awards	Best Music	Samjin Company English Class	Nominated	
2021	42nd Blue Dragon Film Awards	Best Music	The Call	Nominated	
2023	32nd Buil Film Awards	Best Music	Phantom	Won	
2023	Grand Bell Awards	Best Music	Phantom	Won	
2026	35th Buil Film Awards	Best Music	The King's Warden	Nominated	

=== Listicles ===
Name of publisher, year listed, name of listicle, and placement
Publisher	Year	Listicle	Placement	Ref.
Cine21 Film Awards	2023	Music Director of the Year	Won	
