= Bada Kim =

- Birth name: Kim Jung-nam (김정남)
- Born: October 21, 1971 (age 53)
- Origin: South Korea
- Genres: Rock
- Occupation: Singer
- Instrument(s): Vocals, guitar
- Years active: 1995–present
- Labels: Evermore Music
- Website: Art of Parties Cafe

Kim Bada (Korean: 김바다, born October 21, 1971) is a South Korean singer, musician, producer, and songwriter. His birth name is Kim Jung-nam (김정남). From 1995 to 1999, he was the fifth vocalist of Korean rock band Sinawe. In 2003, he formed the rock band Butterfly Effect, which disbanded in 2007. That same year, he became the vocalist of The Ratios, an electronic rock band. In 2009, Kim formed Art Of Parties, and in 2013 released his first solo album, N.Surf part 1.

== Sinawe ==
Kim became the fifth vocalist of legendary heavy metal/rock band Sinawe, formed by guitarist Shin Daechul, son of Shin Junghyeon, in October 1995. His first release with them was the 1996 mini album Circus. He holds the record for the longest-serving vocalist of the band to date.

== Music ==
While Butterfly Effect focused on modern rock and The Ratios on electronic rock, Art Of Parties experiments with garage, alternative, modern and psychedelic rock.

Nicknamed 'The Maestro of Rock Vocalists,' Kim is known for his unchanging expression while he performs.

Kim is a songwriter and producer, having written songs since his time with Sinawe. In 2013, he participated in producing and directing JYJ's Kim Jaejoong's solo mini album.

In 2010, he was a professor in the department of applied music at Seoul Arts College. In 2012, he reunited with Sinawe to participate in MBC's I Am a Singer 2. From 2013 to 2014, he also appeared on KBS's Immortal Songs 2.

== Personal life ==
Kim is married to fashion designer Lee Juyoung, who has designed pieces for Lady Gaga, The Black Eyed Peas and Marilyn Manson.

== Discography ==
=== Sinawe ===
- Circus (1996)
- 은퇴선언 (1997)
- Psychedelos (1998)

=== Butterfly Effect ===
- Butterfly Effect (2003)
- Butterfly Effect 2nd (2005)
- Digital Single – Shooting Star / What A Girl (2006)
- Digital Single – Candy (2007)

=== The Ratios ===
- Burning Telepathy (2008)
- Lusty Initialization (2013)

=== Art Of Parties ===
- Ophelia (2010)
- Seitrap Fo Tra (2011)
- Reborn (2011)
- Digital Single – Island / Never Ever (2012)

=== Solo ===
- N.Surf part 1 (2013)
- Moonage Dream (2014)

=== Soundtracks ===
- 18 vs. 29 O.S.T. – "If Only Once" (2005)
- Miss Korea O.S.T. – "Heartbreaker (With Every Single Day)" (2014)

=== Featurings ===
- Leessang's Hexagonal – "Dying Freedom" (2009)
- Romantic Punch's Midnight Cinderella – "Right Now" (2010)
- Novasonic's Home – Sad Clown (2001)
- Rainy Sun's Origin- Black Dog (2009)
- Noise Cat's Sunday Sunset Airlines – "Playing With Sunday" (2012)
