= I Am a Singer =

Korean singing competition television program

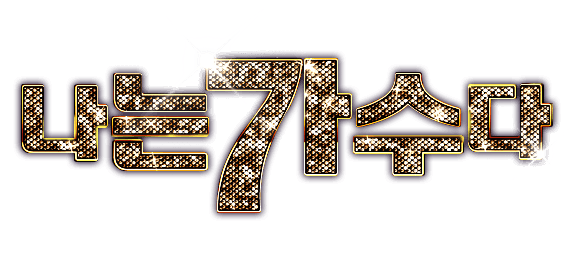
- I Am a Singer's logo (Korean)
- Hangul: 나는 가수다
- RR: Naneun gasuda
- MR: Nanŭn kasuda
- Genre: Reality television
- Created by: Kim Yong Hee MBC
- Presented by: Yoon Jong-shin
- Country of origin: South Korea
- Original language: Korean
- No. of seasons: 3 (Regular Series); 4 (Specials)
- No. of episodes: Season 1: 48; Season 2: 35; Season 3: 13

Production
- Producers: Shin Jung-su; Kim Yu-gon; Lee Beong-huk; Jun Sung-ho; Kim Ming-jong
- Running time: 110 minutes

Original release
- Network: MBC
- Release: March 6, 2011 – 2015

Related
- Sunday Night

I Am a Singer (Korean: 나는 가수다; RR: Naneun gasuda) is a South Korean singing competition television program. It is a part of MBC's Sunday Night lineup. Seven talented, veteran Korean singers perform for a selected audience, which votes to eliminate one singer after each week's performance. The following week, another singer joins the competition, and the lineup of artists varies throughout the course of the show. The program ended its first season on February 19, 2012. Its second season ended in May 2012. Its third season ended on April 24, 2015.

I Am a Singer differs from other televised music competitions in that the participants are all veteran musicians who have established music careers varying from mega stardom to relative obscurity. Due to this fact, and because none of the accomplished singers desire to be voted last amongst their peers and eliminated, the level of performance is usually high and acclaimed by critics and viewers alike.

== Composition ==
The show is divided into rounds. Each round consists of two performance episodes, one that is preliminary and the second final performance which determines the lowest ranking contestant to be eliminated. In between performance are also separate intermediate episodes that document the singers' progress and rehearsals.

Contestants are popular and prominent artists from various genres of the Korean music industry. Each contestant is paired with a "manager", seven Korean entertainers and comedians who serve as mentors, accompany their singers throughout the week to provide support during rehearsals and provide comic relief to the show.

The competition is documented by the week. At the beginning of the 1st performance week, each contestant selects a song of their choice. All contestants spend the week practicing and planning, given free rein on the interpretation of their songs and the staging of their performances. After the performance, votes from the 500-member studio audience determine the singers' rankings, although there is no elimination.

For the 2nd performance week, the singers gather and are assigned predetermined songs that fit their vocal range and style, and the rest of the week is spent in rehearsals and consulting with other musicians. These intermediate episodes include sample performances in the middle of the week, allowing the contestants to exhibit their progress in front of fellow competitors. The competitors privately vote for 1st and 7th place, determining the singers' rankings to serve as a checkpoint.

Final performances are given, again, in front of a live audience. At the end of the performances, the audience casts votes for three favorites. The results are revealed sans audience to the contestants and managers, ranking competitors from first to seventh. The competitor with the lowest average ranking is eliminated, and the next week sees a new singer added to the competition.

Starting from Round 1, the average of both performance scores is taken and the contestant with the lowest total of votes is eliminated, as new contestant replace him/her.

Singers who survive 7 times in a row graduate from the program.

== Competition Results ==
- P = Pass, E = Eliminated, G = Graduated, L = Voluntarily Left, R = Re-challenge

Singer	Results and Airdate															Number of Times Passed
Singer	3/20 (R1)	3/27 (R2)	5/22 (1R)	6/12 (2R)	7/3 (3R)	7/24 (4R)	8/14 (5R)	9/11 (6R)	10/2 (7R)	10/23 (8R)	11/20 (9R)	12/11 (10R)	1/01 (11R)	1/22 (12R)	2/12 (13R)	Number of Times Passed
Park Jung-hyun	P	P	P	P	P	P	G									7
Kim Bum-soo	P	P	P	P	P	P	G									7
Yoon Do-hyun	P	P	P	P	P	P	E									6
Lee So-ra	P	P	P	E												3
Baek Ji-young	P	L														2
Kim Gun-mo	R	L														1
Jungyup	P	E														1
YIm Jae-bum			L													1
Kim Yeon-woo			E													0
BMK			P	P	E											2
Ock Joo-hyun				P	P	E										2
JK Kim Dong-wook				L												1
Jang Hye-jin					P	P	P	P	P	P	E					6
Jo Kwan-woo					P	P	P	P	E							4
Johan Kim						P	P	E								2
Jaurim							P	P	P	P	P	P	G			7
Bobby Kim								P	P	P	P	P	E			5
Yoon Min-soo								P	P	P	P	P	P	G		7
Insooni								P	P	P	P	E				4
Kim Kyung-ho									P	P	P	P	P	P	G	7
Jo Kyu-chan										E						0
Gummy											P	P	P	P	P	4
Juckwoo												P	P	P	P	4
Park Wan-kyu													P	P	P	3
Tei														E		0
Lee Young-hyun															P	1
Lee Hyun-woo															P	1

== List of episodes in Season 1 ==
=== Episodes 1-3: Pilot ===
Episode 1 – 1st Performance

- Broadcast: March 6, 2011

Order of performance	Singer	Song title	Comedian manager	Ranking
1	Lee So-ra	바람이 분다(The Wind is Blowing)	Lee Byung-jin	6
2	Jungyup	Nothing Better	Kim Shin-young	7
3	Baek Ji-young	총 맞은 것 처럼(Like Being Shot by a bullet)	Park Hwi-soon	5
4	Kim Bum-soo	보고 싶다(I Miss You)	Park Myung-su	2
5	Yoon Do-hyun	빨간 숲 속(It Burns)	Kim Je-dong	4
6	Park Jung-hyun	꿈에(In Dream)	Kim Tae-hyun	1
7	Kim Gun-mo	잠 못 드는 밤 비는 내리고(Sleepless Rainy Night)	Ji Sang-ryul	3

Episode 2 - Interim Check

- Broadcast: March 13, 2011

Interim ranking	Singer	Song title	Comedian manager
1	Jungyup	짝사랑 (Ju Hyun-mi)	Kim Shin-young
2	Baek Ji-young	무시로 (Na Hoon-ah)	Park Hwi-soon
3	Kim Bum-soo	그대 모습은 장미 (Min Hye-kyung)	Park Myung-su
4	Park Jung-hyun	비오는 날의 수채화 (Kim Hyun-shik, Kang In-won, Kwon In-ha)	Kim Tae-hyun
5	Lee So-ra	너에게로 또다시 (Byun Jin-seob)	Lee Byung-jin
6	Yoon Do-hyun	나 항상 그대를 (Lee Sun-hee)	Kim Je-dong
7	Kim Gun-mo	립스틱 짙게 바르고 (Im Ju-ri)	Ji Sang-ryul

Episode 3 – 2nd Performance

- Broadcast: March 20, 2011

Order of performance	Singer	Song title	Original singer	Comedian manager	Ranking
1	Yoon Do-hyun	나 항상 그대를(I Always Miss You)	Lee Sun-hee	Kim Je-dong	1(23%)
2	Baek Ji-young	무시로(At Any Time)	Na Hoon-ah	Park Hwi-soon	Private
3	Park Jung-hyun	비오는 날의 수채화(Watercolor of a Rainy day)	Kim Hyun-shik, Kang In-won, Kwon In-ha	Kim Tae-hyun	Private
4	Kim Bum-soo	그대 모습은 장미(Roses Likes You)	Min Hye-kyung	Park Myung-su	Private
5	Kim Gun-mo	립스틱 짙게 바르고(Wearing Lipstick Heavily)	Im Ju-ri	Ji Sang-ryul	7
6	Lee So-ra	너에게로 또다시(To You Again)	Byun Jin-sub	Lee Byung-jin	Private
7	Jungyup	짝사랑(unrequited love)	Ju Hyun-mi	Kim Shin-young	private

- Eliminated: Kim Gun-mo

=== Episode 4: Controversy ===
- Broadcast: March 27, 2011

Kim Gun-mo was eliminated on Episode 3, but the singers all felt that it was too early to be eliminated so he was brought back to try again. This angered the viewers since there were rules in place prior to broadcasting that a singer with the lowest ranking would be eliminated which would bring new singers into the program.

Interim ranking	Singer	Song title	Original Singer	Comedian manager	Ranking
1	Lee So-ra	나의 하루 (My Day)	Park Jung-hyun	Lee Byung-jin	Private
2	Baek Ji-young	약속 (Promise)	Kim Bum-soo	Park Hwi-soon	Private
3	Kim Gun-mo	You Are My Lady	Jung Yeob	Ji Sang-ryul	Private
4	Kim Bum-soo	제발 (Please)	Lee So-ra	Park Myung-su	1(25%)
5	Yoon Do-hyun	Dash	Baek Ji-young	Kim Je-dong	Private
6	Park Jung-hyun	첫인상 (First Impression)	Kim Gun-mo	Kim Tae-hyun	Private
7	Jungyup	잊을게(I'll Get Over You)	Yoon Do-hyun	Kim Shin-young	7

- Eliminated: Jung Yeob

=== Episode 5: Managers' Special ===
- Broadcast: April 24, 2011

Due to the controversy with Kim Gun-mo being eliminated and returning, this episode showed the manager's point of view of the broadcasts and the singers thus far.

=== Episode 6: Exhibition and New Singers ===
- Broadcast: May 1, 2011

The program restarted with some changes, taking both Kim Gun-mo (who was originally eliminated) and Jung Yeob (who was newly eliminated) out of the competition. Baek Ji-young withdrew, citing that she had to prepare for her upcoming album, and three new singers were introduced. This was an exhibition episode; no one was eliminated.

Order of performance	Singer	Song title	Comedian manager	Ranking
1	Lee So-ra	나를 사랑하지 않는 그대에게 (To you who don't love me anymore)	Lee Byung-jin	5
2	Kim Yeon-woo	여전히 아름다운지 (Is it still beautiful)	Go Young-wook	6
3	Yoon Do-hyun	나는 나비 (A Flying Butterfly)	Kim Je-dong	3
4	BMK	꽃피는 봄이오면 (When flower blooming spring comes)	Park Hwi-soon	4
5	Kim Bum-soo	그런 이유라는걸	Park Myung-su	7
6	Park Jung-hyun	미아 (stray child)	Kim Tae-hyun	2
7	Im Jae-bum	너를 위해 (For You)	Ji Sang-ryul	1

=== Episodes 7-9: Round 1 ===
Episode 7 – 1st Performance

- Broadcast: May 8, 2011

The contestants sing a song they want to sing.

Order of performance	Singer	Song title	Original Singer	Comedian manager	Ranking
1	Im Jae-bum	빈잔 (An Empty Cup)	Nam Jin	Ji Sang-ryul	4
2	Kim Yeon-woo	미련 (Lingering Affection)	Kim Gun-mo	Go Young-wook	6
3	BMK	그대 내게 다시 (You to me again)	Byun Ji-sub	Park Hwi-soon	7
4	Yoon Do-hyun	마법의 성 (Magic Castle)	The Classic	Kim Je-dong	5
5	Kim Bum-soo	그대의 향기 (Scent Of You)	Yoo Young-jin	Park Myung-su	3
6	Lee So-ra	No.1	BoA	Lee Byung-jin	2
7	Park Jung-hyun	이젠 그랬으면 좋겠네 (I Hope It would Be That Way Now)	Cho Yong-pil	Kim Tae-hyun	1(22.5%)

Episode 8 - Interim Check

- Broadcast: May 15, 2011

Interim ranking	Singer	Song title	Comedian manager
1	Kim Yeon-woo	나와 같다면 (Kim Jang-hoon)	Go Young-wook
2	BMK	아름다운 강산 (Lee Sun-hee)	Park Hwi-soon
3	Im Jae-bum	여러분 (Yoon Bok-hee)	Ji Sang-ryul
4	Yoon Do-hyun	Run Devil Run (Girls' Generation)	Kim Je-dong
5	Park Jung-hyun	소나기 (Boohwal)	Kim Tae-hyun
6	Lee So-ra	사랑이야 (Song Chang-shik)	Lee Byung-jin
7	Kim Bum-soo	늪 (Jo Gwan-woo)	Park Myung-su

Episode 9 – 2nd Performance

- Broadcast: May 22, 2011

Order of performance	Singer	Song title	Original Singer	Comedian manager	Ranking
1	Lee So-ra	사랑이야 (It's Love)	Song Chang-shik	Lee Byung-jin	6
2	BMK	아름다운 강산 (Beautiful Land)	Lee Sun-hee	Park Hwi-soon	2
3	Yoon Do-hyun	Run Devil Run	Girls' Generation	Kim Je-dong	5
4	Kim Yeon-woo	나와 같다면 (If You Are Like Me)	Kim Jang-hoon	Go Young-wook	4(13.1%)
5	Kim Bum-soo	늪 (Swamp)	Jo Gwan-woo	Park Myung-su	3
6	Park Jung-hyun	소나기 (shower)	Boohwal	Kim Tae-hyun	7
7	Im Jae-bum	여러분( everyone)	Yoon Book-hee	Ji Sang-ryul	1(28.9%)

- Eliminated: Kim Yeon-woo

=== Episodes 10-12: Round 2 ===
Episode 10 – 1st Performance

- Broadcast: May 29, 2011

Order of performance	Singer	Song title	Original Singer	Comedian manager	Ranking
1	Kim Bum-soo	Never Ending Story	Boohwal	Park Myung-su	6
2	BMK	편지(Letter)	Kim Kwang-jin	Park Hwi-soon	7
3	Park Jung-hyun	그대 내 품에(You In My Arms)	Yu Jae-ha	Kim Tae-hyun	3
4	Lee So-ra	주먹이 운다(Crying Fist)	Soul Dive feat. Im Jae-bum	Lee Byung-jin	5
5	Yoon Do-hyun	해야(Sun)	Magma	Kim Je-dong	2
6	JK Kim Dong-wook	비상(soar)	Im Jae-bum	Go Young-wook	4
7	Ock Joo-hyun	천 일 동안(During the Thousand Days)	Lee Seung-hwan	Song Eun-ee	1(21.5%)

Episode 11 - Interim Check

- Broadcast: June 5, 2011

Interim ranking	Singer	Song title	Comedian manager
1	Kim Bum-soo	님과 함께 (Nam Jin)	Park Myung-su
2	Park Jung-hyun	내 낡은 서랍속의 바다 (Panic)	Kim Tae-hyun
3	BMK	비와 당신의 이야기 (Boohwal)	Park Hwi-soon
4	JK Kim Dong-wook	조율 (Han Young-ae)	Go Young-wook
5	Yoon Do-hyun	새벽기차 (Five Fingers)	Kim Je-dong
6	Lee So-ra	행복을 주는 사람 (Sunflower)	Lee Byung-jin
7	Ock Joo-hyun	사랑이 떠나가네 (Kim Gun-mo)	Song Eun-ee

Episode 12 – 2nd Performance

- Broadcast: June 12, 2011

Order of performance	Singer	Song title	Original Singer	Comedian manager	Ranking
1	Kim Bum-soo	님과 함께(With My lover)	Nam Jin	Park Myung-su	1
2	Park Jung-hyun	내 낡은 서랍속의 바다(The sea in my worn drawer)	Panic	Kim Tae-hyun	3
3	BMK	비와 당신의 이야기(Rain and Your Story)	Boohwal	Park Hwi-soon	4
4	Ock Joo-hyun	사랑이 떠나가네(Love Is Gone)	(Kim Gun-mo)	Song Eun-ee	5
5	Yoon Do-hyun	새벽기차(Dawn Train)	Five Fingers	Kim Je-dong	7
6	Lee So-ra	행복을 주는 사람(Person That Gives Me Happiness)	(Sunflower)	Lee Byung-jin	6
7	JK Kim Dong-wook	조율(mediation)	Han Young-ae	Go Young-wook	2

- Eliminated: Lee So-ra
- JK Kim Dong-wook withdrew from the competition due to making a lyrical mistake in his performance.

=== Episodes 13-15: Round 3 ===
Episode 13 – 1st Performance

- Broadcast: June 19, 2011

Order of performance	Singer	Song title	Original Singer	Comedian manager	Ranking
1	Yoon Do-hyun	커피 한 잔(A Cup Of Coffee)	Pearl Sisters	Kim Je-dong	3
2	Kim Bum-soo	여름 안에서(In Summer)	Deux	Park Myung-su	6 (Tied)
3	Ock Joo-hyun	서시(preface)	Shin Sung-woo	Song Eun-ee	4
4	Park Jung-hyun	바보(fool)	Park Hyo-shin	Kim Tae-hyun	2
5	BMK	삐에로는 우릴 보고 웃지(A Clown Watching Us and Laughing)	Kim Wan-sun	Park Hwi-soon	1(18%)
6	Jang Hye-jin	슬픈 인연(Sad Fate)	Na-mi	Ji Sang-ryul	5
7	Jo Kwan-woo	이별여행(Parting Travel)	Won Mi-yeon	Kim Shin-young	6 (Tied)

Episode 14 - Interim Check

- Broadcast: June 26, 2011

Interim ranking	Singer	Song title	Comedian manager
1	Park Jung-hyun	겨울비 (Sinawe)	Kim Tae-hyun
2	Jo Kwan-woo	하얀 나비 (Kim Jung-ho)	Kim Shin-young
3	Yoon Do-hyun	빙글빙글 (Na-mi)	Kim Je-dong
4	Jang Hye-jin	가까이하기엔 너무 먼 당신 (Lee Kwang-jo)	Ji Sang-ryul
5	BMK	사랑하기에 (Lee Jung-suk)	Park Hwi-soon
6	Kim Bum-soo	사랑하오 (Kim Hyun-chul, Yoon Sang)	Park Myung-su
7	Ock Joo-hyun	Love (Jo Jang-hyuk)	Song Eun-ee

Episode 15 – 2nd Performance

- Broadcast: July 3, 2011

Order of performance	Singer	Song title	Original Singer	Comedian manager	Ranking
1	Park Jung-hyun	겨울비(Winter Rain)	Sinawe	Kim Tae-hyun	3
2	Yoon Do-hyun	빙글빙글(round and round)	Na-mi	Kim Je-dong	1
3	Kim Bum-soo	사랑하오(I Love You)	Kim Hyun-chul, Yoon Sang	Park Myung-su	5
4	Jang Hye-jin	가까이하기엔 너무 먼 당신(You are too close to a distant)	Lee Kwang-jo	Ji Sang-ryul	4
5	BMK	사랑하기에(To love)	Lee Jung-suk	Park Hwi-soon	7
6	Jo Kwan-woo	하얀 나비(White Butterfly)	Kim Jung-ho	Kim Shin-young	2
7	Ock Joo-hyun	Love	Jo Jang-hyuk	Song Eun-ee	6

- Eliminated: BMK

=== Episodes 16-18: Round 4 ===
Episode 16 – 1st Performance

- Broadcast: July 10, 2011

Order of performance	Singer	Song title	Original Singer	Comedian manager	Ranking
1	Jo Kwan-woo	남행열차(a south-bound train)	Kim Su-hee	Kim Shin-young	5
2	Ock Joo-hyun	U-Go-Girl	Lee Hyo-ri	Song Eun-ee	6
3	Park Jung-hyun	이브의 경고(Eve's Warning)	Park Mi-kyung	Kim Tae-hyun	2
4	Yoon Do-hyun	빗속에서(In the rain)	Lee Moon-sae	Kim Je-dong	4
5	Kim Bum-soo	외톨이야(I'm Loner)	CN Blue	Park Myung-su	3
6	Jang Hye-jin	미스터(Mr.)	Kara	Ji Sang-ryul	7
7	Kim Jo-han	I Believe	Shin Seung-hoon	Go Young-wook	1(17.8%)

Episode 17 - Interim Check

- Broadcast: July 17, 2011

Interim ranking	Singer	Song title	Comedian Manager
1	Jang Hye-jin	술이야(Vibe)	Ji Sang-ryul
2	Kim Jo-han	Honey (Park Jin-young)	Go Young-wook
3	Park Jung-hyun	나 가거든 (Sumi Jo)	Kim Tae-hyun
4	Yoon Do-hyun	크게 라디오를 켜고 (Sinawe)	Kim Je-dong
5	Jo Kwan-woo	화요일에 비가 내리면 (Park Mi-kyung)	Kim Shin-young
6	Ock Joo-hyun	남자는 배 여자는 항구 (Sim Soo-bong)	Song Eun-ee
7	Kim Bum-soo	희나리 (Goo Chang-mo)	Park Myung-su

Episode 18 – 2nd Performance

- Broadcast: July 24, 2011

Order of performance	Singer	Song title	Original Singer	Comedian Manager	Ranking
1	Jang Hye-jin	술이야(I'm Alcohol)	Vibe	Ji Sang-ryul	2
2	Kim Jo-han	Honey	Park Jin-young	Go Young-wook	6
3	Ock Joo-hyun	남자는 배 여자는 항구(Man is ship, Woman is harbor)	Sim Soo-bong	Song Eun-ee	7
4	Yoon Do-hyun	크게 라디오를 켜고(Turn On Radio Loudly)	Sinawe	Kim Je-dong	5
5	Jo Kwan-woo	화요일에 비가 내리면(When It Rains On Tuesday)	Park Mi-kyung	Kim Shin-young	4
6	Kim Bum-soo	희나리(wet firewood)	Goo Chang-mo	Park Myung-su	3
7	Park Jung-hyun	나 가거든(If I Leave)	Sumi Jo	Kim Tae-hyun	1

- Eliminated: Ock Joo-hyun

=== Episodes 19-21: Round 5 ===
Episode 19 – 1st Performance

- Broadcast: July 31, 2011

Order of performance	Singer	Song title	Original Singer	Comedian manager	Ranking
1	Jo Kwan-woo	고향역(Hometown Station)	Na Hoon-ah	Kim Shin-young	5
2	Park Jung-hyun	우연히(by chance)	Lee Jung-sun	Kim Tae-hyun	3
3	Yoon Do-hyun	삐딱하게(perverse)	Kang San-ae	Kim Je-dong	7
4	Jang Hye-jin	애모(affection)	Kim Su-hee	Ji Sang-ryul	2
5	Kim Jo-han	취중진담(The Truth in Wine)	Exhibition	Go Young-wook	4
6	Kim Bum-soo	사랑으로(With Love)	Sunflower	Park Myung-su	6
7	Jaurim	고래사냥(Whale Hunting)	Song Chang-shik	Park Hwi-soon	1(22.5%)

Episode 20 - Interim Check

- Broadcast: August 7, 2011

Interim ranking	Singer	Song title	Comedian manager
1	Park Jung-hyun	그것만이 내 세상 (Deul Kook Hwa)	Kim Tae-hyun
2	Kim Bum-soo	홀로 된다는 것 (Byun Ji-sub)	Park Myung-su
3	Jang Hye-jin	누구 없소 (Han Young-ae)	Ji Sang-ryul
4	Kim Jo-han	세월이 가면 (Choi Ho-sub)	Go Young-wook
5	Jaurim	뜨거운 안녕 (Johnny Lee)	Park Hwi-soon
6	Yoon Do-hyun	내 사람이여 (Lee Dong-won)	Kim Je-dong
7	Jo Kwan-woo	그대 내 맘에 들어오면은 (Jo Duk-bae)	Kim Shin-young

Episode 21 – 2nd Performance

- Broadcast: August 14, 2011

Order of performance	Singer	Song title	Original Singer	Comedian manager	Ranking
1	Jang Hye-jin	누구 없소(Is There Anybody?)	Han Young-ae	Ji Sang-ryul	6
2	Jaurim	뜨거운 안녕(Burning Good-bye)	Johnny Lee	Park Hwi-soon	7
3	Kim Jo-han	세월이 가면(As Time Passes)	Choi Ho-sub	Go Young-wook	5
4	Kim Bum-soo	홀로 된다는 것(Be Alone)	Byun Ji-sub	Park Myung-su	2
5	Yoon Do-hyun	내 사람이여(My Dear)	Lee Dong-won	Kim Je-dong	4
6	Jo Kwan-woo	그대 내 맘에 들어오면은(If You Come Into My Heart)	Jo Duk-bae	Kim Shin-young	3
7	Park Jung-hyun	그것만이 내 세상(It's Only My World)	Deul Kook Hwa	Kim Tae-hyun	1

- Eliminated: Yoon Do-hyun
- Honor Graduation: Park Jung-hyun, Kim Bum-soo

=== Episode 22: Graduation and Exhibition ===
- Broadcast: August 21, 2011

Three new singers are introduced into the competition. All contestants performed one of their own songs. This is an exhibition episode; no one was eliminated.

- Graduation Performance: Park Jung-hyun and Kim Bum-soo singing 사랑보다 깊은 상처 (Im Jae-bum, Park Jung-hyun)

Order of performance	Singer	Song title	Comedian manager	Ranking
1	Bobby Kim	사랑.. 그놈(Love.. That Guy)	Kim Tae-hyun	5
2	Jang Hye-jin	아름다운 날들(Beautiful Days)	Ji Sang-ryul	6
3	Kim Jo-han	천생연분(A match made in heaven)	Go Young-wook	3
4	Yoon Min-soo	그남자 그여자+ 술이야	Song Eun-ee	2
5	Jo Kwan-woo	사랑했으므로	Kim Shin-young	4
6	Jaurim	매직 카펫 라이드(Magic Carpet Ride)	Park Hwi-soon	7
7	Insooni	아버지(Father)	Park Myung-su	1(27.7%)

=== Episodes 23-25: Round 6 ===
Episode 23 – 1st Performance

- Broadcast: August 28, 2011

Order of performance	Singer	Song title	Original Singer	Comedian manager	Ranking
1	Yoon Min-soo	그리움만 쌓이네(Piled Up With Longing)	Yeo Jin	Song Eun-ee	2
2	Insooni	난 괜찮아(I'm OK)	Jin Ju	Park Myung-su	3
3	Jo Kwan-woo	그대는 어디에(Where are you)	Im Jae-bum	Kim Shin-young	7
4	Bobby Kim	태양을 피하는 방법(Ways To Avoid The Sun)	Rain	Kim Tae-hyun	5
5	Jaurim	왼손잡이(left-handed person)	Panic	Park Hwi-soon	6
6	Kim Jo-han	사랑하기 때문에(Because of Love)	Yu Chae-ha	Go Young-wook	4
7	Jang Hye-jin	가질 수 없는 너(Can't have You)	Bank	Ji Sang-ryul	1(26.9%)

Episode 24 - Interim Check

- Broadcast: September 4, 2011

Interim ranking	Singer	Song title	Comedian manager
1	Bobby Kim	너의 결혼식 (Yoon Jong-shin)	Kim Tae-hyun
2	Insooni	서른 즈음에 (Kim Kwang-suk)	Park Myung-su
3	Jaurim	재즈 카페 (Shin Hae-chul)	Park Hwi-soon
4	Yoon Min-soo	사랑 그 쓸쓸함에 대하여 (Yang Hee-eun)	Song Eun-ee
5	Kim Jo-han	아름다운 이별 (Kim Gun-mo)	Go Young-wook
6	Jang Hye-jin	멀어져간 사람아 (Park Sang-min)	Ji Sang-ryul
7	Jo Kwan-woo	달의 몰락 (Kim Hyun-chul)	Kim Shin-young

Episode 25 – 2nd Performance

- Broadcast: September 11, 2011

Order of performance	Singer	Song title	Original Singer	Comedian manager	Ranking
1	Yoon Min-soo	사랑 그 쓸쓸함에 대하여(About The Loneliness Called Love)	Yang Hee-eun	Song Eun-ee	5
2	Insooni	서른 즈음에(About Thirty)	Kim Kwang-suk	Park Myung-su	2
3	Kim Jo-han	아름다운 이별(beautiful goodbye)	Kim Gun-mo	Go Young-wook	7
4	Jang Hye-jin	멀어져간 사람아(My Love in distant memory)	Park Sang-min	Ji Sang-ryul	4
5	Jaurim	재즈 카페(Jazz Cafe)	Shin Hae-chul	Park Hwi-soon	1(20.5%)
6	Jo Kwan-woo	달의 몰락(Moon's Fall)	Kim Hyun-chul	Kim Shin-young	3
7	Bobby Kim	너의 결혼식(Your Wedding)	Yoon Jong-shin	Kim Tae-hyun	6

- Eliminated: Kim Jo-han

=== Episodes 26-28: Round 7 ===
Episode 26 – 1st Performance

- Broadcast: September 18, 2011

Order of performance	Singer	Song title	Original Singer	Comedian manager	Ranking
1	Jang Hye-jin	그대와 영원히(With You Forever)	Lee Moon-sae	Ji Sang-ryul	7
2	Jo Kwan-woo	이름 모를 소녀(The young girl who does not know a name)	Kim Jung-ho	Kim Shin-young	6
3	Insooni	오늘 같은 밤이면(If it is like tonight)	Park Jung-eun	Park Myung-su	2
4	Yoon Min-soo	님은 먼 곳에(You So far away)	Kim Chu-ja	Ahn Young-mi	5
5	Bobby Kim	골목길(An Alley)	Shinchon Blues	Kim Tae-hyun	1(20.7%)
6	Jaurim	가시나무(Thorn Tree)	Poet and Village Chief	Park Hwi-soon	3
7	Kim Kyung-ho	모두 다 사랑하리(I'll Love Everything)	Song Gol-mae	Jung Sung-ho	4

Episode 27 - Interim Check

- Broadcast: September 25, 2011

Interim ranking	Singer	Song title	Comedian manager
1	Jaurim	꿈 (Cho Yong-pil)	Park Hwi-soon
2	Insooni	그 겨울의 찻집 (Cho Yong-pil)	Park Myung-su
3	Kim Kyung-ho	못 찾겠다 꾀꼬리 (Cho Yong-pil)	Jung Sung-ho
4	Bobby Kim	추억 속의 재회 (Cho Yong-pil)	Kim Tae-hyun
5	Jo Kwan-woo	단발머리 (Cho Yong-pil)	Kim Shin-young
6	Yoon Min-soo	창 밖의 여자 (Cho Yong-pil)	Song Eun-ee
7	Jang Hye-jin	모나리자 (Cho Yong-pil)	Ji Sang-ryul

Episode 28 – 2nd Performance (Cho Yong-pil Special)

- Broadcast: October 2, 2011

The contestants performed songs of their choice by Cho Yong-pil.

Order of performance	Singer	Song title	Original Singer	Comedian manager	Ranking
1	Jaurim	꿈(Dream)	Cho Yong-pil	Park Hwi-soon	3
4	Jang Hye-jin	모나리자(Mona Lisa)	Cho Yong-pil	Ji Sang-ryul	5
3	Yoon Min-soo	창 밖의 여자(The Woman Outside the Window)	Cho Yong-pil	Song Eun-ee	7
4	Insooni	그 겨울의 찻집(Tea House in the Winter)	Cho Yong-pil	Park Myung-su	4
5	Jo Kwan-woo	단발머리(Short Hair)	Cho Yong-pil	Kim Shin-young	6
6	Bobby Kim	추억 속의 재회(Meet again in memory)	Cho Yong-pil	Kim Tae-hyun	2
7	Kim Kyung-ho	못 찾겠다 꾀꼬리(Can't find the oriole)	Cho Yong-pil	Jung Sung-ho	1

- Eliminated: Jo Kwan-woo

=== Episodes 29-31: Round 8 ===
Episode 29 – 1st Performance (Duet Special)

- Broadcast: October 9, 2011

Order of performance	Singer	Song title	Original Singer	Comedian manager	Ranking
1	Insooni & Kim Do-hyang	바보처럼 살았군요(I Lived Like A Fool)	Kim Do-hyang	Park Myung-su	5
2	Jaurim & Baek Hyun-jin	사랑밖에 난 몰라(I only know love)	Sim Soo-bong	Park Hwi-soon	4
3	Yoon Min-soo & Lee Young-hyun	체념(Resignation)	Big Mama	Song Eun-ee	3
4	Jang Hye-jin & Kim Jo-han	이별 이야기(Farewell Story)	Lee Moon-sae	Ji Sang-ryul	6
5	Bobby Kim & Buga Kingz	물레방아 인생(Waterwheel Life)	Jo Young-nam	Kim Tae-hyun	1(23.2%)
6	Kim Kyung-ho & Kim Yeon-woo	사랑과 우정 사이(Between love and friendship)	Pinocchio	Jung Sung-ho	2
7	Jo Kyu-chan & Park Ki-young	이 밤이 지나면(After the night)	Im Jae-bum	Lee Byung-jin	7

Episode 30 - Interim Check

- Broadcast: October 16, 2011

Insooni had a performance at Carnegie Hall and was absent. The lowest ranking is 6th place.

Interim ranking	Singer	Song title	Comedian manager
1	Jaurim	라구요 (Kang San-ae)	Park Hwi-soon
2	Yoon Min-soo	아리랑 (Kim Yong-woo)	Song Eun-ee
3	Bobby Kim	사랑 사랑 사랑 (Kim Hyun-shik)	Kim Tae-hyun
4	Kim Kyung-ho	암연 (Go Han-woo)	Jung Sung-ho
5	Jo Kyu-chan	이별이란 없는거야 (Choi Sung-won)	Lee Byung-jin
6	Jang Hye-jin	미소 속에 비친 그대 (Shin Seung-hun)	Ji Sang-ryul
Absent	Insooni	봄 여름 가을 겨울 (Kim Hyun-shuk)	Park Myung-su

Episode 31 – 2nd Performance

- Broadcast: October 23, 2011

The contestants and managers were flown to Melbourne, Australia, where they held a special concert for the 2nd performance at the Sidney Myer Music Bowl to an audience of 2,000. Unlike previous final performances, there was no predetermined setlist and all contestants performed a song of their choice.

Order of performance	Singer	Song title	Original singer	Comedian manager	Ranking
1	Jo Kyu-chan	이별이란 없는거야 (No farewell)	Choi Sung-won	Lee Byung-jin	5
2	Jang Hye-jin	미소 속에 비친 그대 (Your Reflection in Smile)	Shin Seung-hun	Ji Sang-ryul	6
3	Insooni	봄 여름 가을 겨울 (Spring, Summer, Fall, Winter)	Kim Hyun-shik	Park Myung-su	1(25%)
4	Kim Kyung-ho	암연 (Tearful)	Go Han-woo	Jung Sung-ho	3
5	Jaurim	라구요(Ragooyo)	Kang San-ae	Park Hwi-soon	4
6	Bobby Kim	사랑 사랑 사랑 (Love Love Love)	Kim Hyun-shik	Kim Tae-hyun	2(about 20%)
7	Yoon Min-soo	아리랑 (Arirang)	Kim Yong-woo	Song Eun-ee	7

- Eliminated: Jo Kyu-chan

=== Episode 32: Australia Exhibition ===
- Broadcast: October 30, 2011

Seven former contestants and graduates accompanied the current singers to Melbourne, where they also performed songs of their choice. The audience also voted to rank the singers, although no one was eliminated.

Order of performance	Singer	Song title	Original singer	Comedian manager	Ranking
1	JK Kim Dong-wook	상록수 (Evergreen Tree)	Yang Hee-eun	Ji Sang-ryul	6
2	Yoon Do-hyun	붉은노을 (Red Sunset)	Lee Moon-sae	Park Hwi-soon	2
3	Park Jung-hyun	널 붙잡을 노래 (Love Song)	Rain	Kim Tae-hyun	5
4	Kim Yeon-woo	내 사랑 내 곁에 (My Love By My Side)	Kim Hyun-shik	Jung Sung-ho	1
5	Kim Bum-soo	사랑했지만 (Though I loved)	Kim Kwang-suk	Park Myung-su	3
6	Lee So-ra	슬픔 속에 그댈 지워야만 해 (I must forget you in the sorrow)	Lee Hyun-woo	Lee Byung-jin	7
7	Kim Jo-han	나는 문제없어 (I don't have any problem)	Hwang Kyu-young	Song Eun-ee	4

=== Episodes 33-35: Round 9 ===
Episode 33: 1st Performance

- Broadcast: November 6, 2011

Order of performance	Singer	Song title	Original singer	Comedian manager	Ranking
1	Jang Hye-jin	분홍 립스틱 (Pink Lipstick)	Kang Eliza	Ji Sang-ryul	4
2	Yoon Min-soo	만약에 (If)	Taeyeon (Girl's Generation)	Song Eun-ee	6
3	Bobby Kim	만남(Meet)	Noh Sa-yeon	Kim Tae-hyun	7
4	Kim Kyung-ho	이유 같지 않은 이유 (Unreasonable Reason)	Park Mi-kyung	Jung Sung-ho	1(29%)
5	Jaurim	아브라카다브라 (Abracadabra)	Brown Eyed Girls	Park Hwi-soon	5
6	Insooni	토요일은 밤이 좋아 (I like Saturday night)	Kim Jong-chan	Park Myung-su	3
7	Gummy	난 행복해 (I'm Happy)	Lee So-ra	Kim Shin-young	2

Episode 34: Interim Check

- Broadcast: November 13, 2011

Interim ranking	Singer	Song title	Comedian manager	Ranking
1	Kim Kyung-ho	Hey Hey Hey (Jaurim)	Jung Sung-ho	1
2	Insooni	금지된 사랑 (Kim Kyung-ho)	Park Myung-su	
3	Jang Hye-jin	사랑.. 그놈 (Bobby Kim)	Ji Sang-ryul	
4	Gummy	또 (Insooni)	Kim Shin-young	
5	Yoon Min-soo	기억상실 (Gummy)	Song Eun-ee	
6	Bobby Kim	미워도 다시 한 번 (Vibe)	Kim Tae-hyun	
7	Jaurim	1994년 어느 늦은 밤 (Jang Hye-jin)	Park Hwi-soon	

Episode 35: 2nd Performance (Switch Special)

- Broadcast: November 20, 2011

The contestants performed another contestant's original song.

Order of performance	Singer	Song title	Original singer	Comedian manager	Ranking
1	Jaurim	1994년 어느 늦은 밤 (One late night in 1994)	Jang Hye-jin	Park Hwi-soon	5
2	Yoon Min-soo	기억상실 (Loss of Memory)	Gummy	Song Eun-ee	4
3	Bobby Kim	미워도 다시 한 번 (Love me Once Again)	Vibe	Kim Tae-hyun	2
4	Jang Hye-jin	사랑.. 그놈 (Love.. That Guy)	Bobby Kim	Ji Sang-ryul	6
5	Gummy	또 (Again)	Insooni	Kim Shin-young	7
6	Insooni	금지된 사랑 (Forbidden Love)	Kim Kyung-ho	Park Myung-su	3
7	Kim Kyung-ho	Hey Hey Hey	Jaurim	Jung Sung-ho	1

- Eliminated: Jang Hye-jin

=== Episodes 36-38: Round 10 ===
Episode 36: 1st Performance

- Broadcast: November 27, 2011

Order of performance	Singer	Song title	Original singer	Comedian manager	Ranking
1	Gummy	비처럼 음악처럼 (Like rain and music)	Kim Hyun-shik	Kim Shin-young	4
2	Jaurim	얘기할 수 없어요 (I Cannot Say)	Love and Peace	Park Hwi-soon	3
3	Insooni	나만의 슬픔 (My Own Grief)	Kim Dong-kyu	Park Myung-su	7
4	Yoon Min-soo	빗 속의 여인 (The Woman In The Rain)	Add4	Song Eun-ee	1(22.9%)
5	Bobby Kim	한동안 뜸했었지 (It has been a long while)	Love and Peace	Kim Tae-hyun	6
6	Kim Kyung-ho	내 눈물 모아(With My Tears)	Seo Ji-won	Jung Sung-ho	5
7	Juckwoo	열애(Passionate Love)	Yoon Si-nae	Kim Sook	2

Episode 37: Interim Check

- Broadcast: December 4, 2011

Interim ranking	Singer	Song title	Comedian manager	Ranking
1	Bobby Kim	회상 (Sanullim)	Kim Tae-hyun	
2	Gummy	개구쟁이 (Sanullim)	Kim Shin-young	
3	Yoon Min-soo	나 어떡해 (Sand Pebbles)	Song Eun-ee	
4	Insooni	청춘 (Sanullim)	Park Myung-su	
5	Kim Kyung-ho	찻잔 (Nohgojili)	Jung Sung-ho	
5	Jaurim	내 마음에 주단을 깔고 (Sanullim)	Park Hwi-soon	
7	Juckwoo	나 홀로 뜰 앞에서 (Kim Wan-sun)	Kim Sook	

Episode 38: 2nd Performance (Sanullim Special)

- Broadcast: December 11, 2011

The contestants performed songs of their choice by Sanullim or song that Sanullim's member compose.

Order of performance	Singer	Song title	Original singer	Comedian Manager	Ranking
1	Insooni	청춘 (Youth)	Sanullim	Park Myung-su	5
2	Kim Kyung-ho	찻잔 (Tea Cup)	Nohgojili	Jung Sung-ho	4
3	Jaurim	내 마음에 주단을 깔고 (Laid Silk and Satins On My Heart)	Sanullim	Park Hwi-soon	2
4	Yoon Min-soo	나 어떡해 (What Am I Gonna Do)	Sand Pebbles	Song Eun-ee	3
5	Bobby Kim	회상 (Remembrance)	Sanullim	Kim Tae-hyun	6
6	Juckwoo	나 홀로 뜰 앞에서 (Alone In Front Garden)	Kim Wan-sun	Kim Sook	7
7	Gummy	개구쟁이(Punk Kid)	Sanullim	Kim Shin-young	1(20.9%)

- Eliminated: Insooni

=== Episodes 39-41: Round 11 ===
Episode 39: 1st Performance

- Broadcast: December 18, 2011

The contestants sing a song they want to sing.

Order of performance	Singer	Song title	Original singer	Comedian manager	Ranking
1	Park Wan-kyu	사랑했어요 (I Loved You)	Kim Hyun-shik	Ji Sang-ryul	2
2	Juckwoo	어떤이의 꿈 (Someone's dream)	Spring Summer Fall Winter	Kim Sook	5
3	Gummy	날 떠나지마 (Don't Leave Me)	Park Jin-young	Kim Shin-young	6
4	Bobby Kim	가을을 남기고 간 사랑 (Love gone with autumn behind)	Patty Kim	Kim Tae-hyun	7
5	Kim Kyung-ho	아직도 어두운 밤 인가봐 (Still a dark night)	Jun Young-lok	Jung Sung-ho	1
6	Jaurim	정신차려 (Wake Up)	Kim Soo-chul	Park Hwi-soon	4
7	Yoon Min-soo	어머님께 (To Mother)	g.o.d	Song Eun-ee	3

Episode 40: Interim Check

- Broadcast: December 25, 2011

Interim ranking	Singer	Song title	Comedian manager	Ranking
1	Bobby Kim	Double (Kim Gun-mo)	Kim Tae-hyun	
2	Yoon Min-soo	꽃피는 봄이 오면 (BMK)	Song Eun-ee	
3	Jaurim	하루 (Kim Bum-soo)	Park Hwi-soon	
3	Juckwoo	처음 느낌 그대로 (Lee So-ra)	Kim Sook	
5	Gummy	P.S. I Love You (Park Jung-hyun)	Kim Shin-young	
6	Park Wan-kyu	고해 (Im Jae-bum)	Ji Sang-ryul	
7	Kim Kyung-ho	사랑 안해 (Baek Ji-young)	Jung Sung-ho	

Episode 41: 2nd Performance

- Broadcast: January 1, 2012

The contestants performed a former contestant's original song.

Order of performance	Singer	Song title	Original singer	Comedian manager	Ranking
1	Juckwoo	처음 느낌 그대로 (As Your First Feeling)	Lee Sora	Kim Sook	6
2	Bobby Kim	Double	Kim Gun-mo	Kim Tae-hyun	7
3	Kim Kyung-ho	사랑 안해 (Don't Love)	Baek Ji-young	Jung Sung-ho	4
4	Gummy	P.S. I Love You	Park Jung-hyun	Kim Shin-young	5
5	Park Wan-kyu	고해 (Confession)	Im Jae-bum	Ji Sang-ryul	1(20.4%)
6	Jaurim	하루 (A Day)	Kim Bum-soo	Park Hwi-soon	2
7	Yoon Min-soo	꽃피는 봄이 오면 (When Spring Comes)	BMK	Song Eun-ee	3

- Eliminated: Bobby Kim
- Honor Graduation: Jaurim

=== Episodes 42-44: Round 12 ===
Episode 42: 1st Performance

- Broadcast: January 8, 2012

The contestants sing a song they want to sing.

Order of performance	Singer	Song title	Original singer	Comedian manager	Ranking
1	Gummy	내 하나의 사람은 가고 (My sole lover had gone)	Lim Hee-sook	Kim Shin-young	5
2	Tei	넌 할 수 있어 (You can do it)	Kang San-ae	Kim Tae-hyun	6
3	Park Wan-kyu	내일을 향해 (Towards tomorrow)	Shin Sung-woo	Ji Sang-ryul	7
4	Yoon Min-soo	짚시여인 (Gypsy Woman)	Lee Chi-hyun and Buddies	Song Eun-ee	4
5	Shin Hyo-bum	이별연습 (Farewell Practice)	Insooni	Park Hwi-soon	1
6	Kim Kyung-ho	밤차 (Night Train)	Lee Eun-ha	Jung Sung-ho	3
7	Juckwoo	사람이 꽃보다 아름다워 (People are more beautiful than flowers)	Ahn Chi-hwan	Kim Sook	2

Episode 43: Interim Check

- Broadcast: January 15, 2012

Interim ranking	Singer	Song title	Comedian manager	Ranking
1	Park Wan-kyu	하망연 (何茫然) (Alessandro Safina)	Ji Sang-ryul	
2	Kim Kyung-ho	걸어서 하늘까지 (Jang Hyun-cheol)	Jung Sung-ho	
3	Gummy	애인있어요 (Lee Eun-mi)	Kim Shin-young	
4	Yoon Min-soo	잊지 말아요 (Baek Ji-young)	Song Eun-ee	
5	Shin Hyo-bum	미련한 사랑 (JK Kim Dong-wook)	Park Hwi-soon	
6	Juckwoo	이등병의 편지 (Kim Kwang-suk)	Kim Sook	
7	Tei	내 생애 봄날은 (Can)	Kim Tae-hyun	

Episode 44: 2nd Performance

- Broadcast: January 22, 2012

The contestants sing a song their choice by O.S.T

Order of performance	Singer	Song title	Original singer	Comedian manager	Ranking
1	Juckwoo	이등병의 편지 (Letter of a Private)	Kim Kwang-suk	Kim Sook	6
2	Yoon Min-soo	잊지 말아요(Do Not Forget)	Baek Ji-young	Song Eun-ee	3
3	Tei	내 생애 봄날은 (Spring in my life)	Can	Kim Tae-hyun	7
4	Shin Hyo-bum	미련한 사랑 (Foolish Love)	JK Kim Dong-wook	Park Hwi-soon	5
5	Kim Kyung-ho	걸어서 하늘까지 (Walking all the way to Sky)	Jang Hyun-cheol	Jung Sung-ho	2
6	Gummy	애인있어요 (I have a lover)	Lee Eun-mi	Kim Shin-young	4
7	Park Wankyu	하망연(何茫然)	Alessandro Safina	Ji Sang-ryul	1

- Eliminated: Tei
- Honor Graduation: Yoon Min-soo

=== Episodes 45-47: Round 13 ===
Episode 45: 1st Performance

- Broadcast: January 29, 2012

The contestants sing a song they want to sing.

Order of performance	Singer	Song title	Original singer	Comedian manager	Ranking
1	Lee Young-hyun	슬프도록 아름다운 (Sorrowfully beautiful)	K2	Song Eun-ee	5
2	Kim Kyung-ho	못다 핀 꽃 한송이 (A flower yet to bloom)	Kim Soo-chul	Jung Sung-ho	6
3	Juckwoo	어둠 그 별빛 (The Darkness, the Starlight)	Kim Hyun-shik	Kim Sook	3
4	Gummy	영원한 친구 (Forever Friend)	Nami	Kim Shin-young	1
5	Lee Hyun-woo	이 밤을 다시 한번 (This Night Again)	Cho Ha-moon	Kim Tae-hyun	7
6	Park Wan-kyu	어느 60대 노부부의 이야기 (A story of 60 years old couple)	Kim Mok-kyung	Ji Sang-ryul	4
7	Shin Hyo-bum	떠나야 할 그 사람 (Person Who Must Leave)	Pearl Sisters	Park Hwi-soon	2

Episode 46: Interim Check

- Broadcast: February 5, 2012

Interim ranking	Singer	Song title	Comedian manager	Ranking
1	Lee Young-hyun	천년의 사랑 Park Wan-kyu	Song Eun-ee	
2	Lee Hyun-woo	그냥 걸었어 (Lim Jong-hwan)	Kim Tae-hyun	
3	Kim Kyung-ho	그녀의 웃음소리뿐 (Lee Moon-sae)	Jung Sung-ho	
4	Park Wan-kyu	아버지(Kim Kyung-ho)	Ji Sang-ryul	
5	Shin Hyo-Bum	세월 가면 (Lee Kwang-jo)	Park Hwi-soon	
6	Juckwoo	저 꽃 속에 찬란한 빛이 (Park Kyung-hee)	Kim Sook	
7	Gummy	흐린 기억속의 그대 (Hyun Jin-young)	Kim Shin-young	

Episode 47: 2nd Performance

- Broadcast: February 12, 2012

Order of performance	Singer	Song title	Original singer	Comedian manager	Ranking
1	Shin Hyo-Bum	세월 가면(Time Passes)	Lee Kwang-jo	Park Hwi-soon	6
2	Kim Kyung-ho	그녀의 웃음소리뿐 (Only laughing voice of her)	Lee Moon-sae	Jung Sung-ho	4
3	Juckwoo	저 꽃 속에 찬란한 빛이 (Brilliant light in that flower)	Park Kyung-hee	Kim Sook	7
4	Park Wan-kyu	아버지(Father)	Kim Kyung-ho	Ji Sang-ryul	5
5	Lee Young-hyun	천년의 사랑 (Love Over A Thousand Years)	Park Wan-kyu	Song Eun-ee	1
6	Lee Hyun-woo	그냥 걸었어 (Just walk)	Lim Jong-hwan	Kim Tae-hyun	3
7	Gummy	흐린 기억속의 그대 (You Inside My Dim Memory)	Hyun Jin-young	Kim Shin-young	2

- Eliminated: None
- Honor Graduation: Kim Kyung-ho

== International franchise ==
Franchise with a currently airing season
Franchise with an upcoming season
Franchise that has ended
Franchise with an unknown status

Country/Region	Local title	Network	Winners	Hosts
Cambodia	I Am a Singer Cambodia	Hang Meas HDTV	Season 1, 2016: Doung Virakseth	Chan Keonimol & Sun Visal
China (Mandarin)	我是歌手; I Am a Singer (1–4) 歌手; Singer (5–9)	Hunan Television	Season 1, 2013: Yu Quan; Season 2, 2014: Han Lei; Season 3, 2015: Han Hong; Season 4, 2016: Coco Lee; Season 5, 2017: Sandy Lam; Season 6, 2018: Jessie J; Season 7, 2019: Liu Huan; Season 8, 2020: Hua Chenyu; Season 9, 2024: Na Ying; Season 10, 2025: Chen Chusheng; Season 11, 2026: Hu Yanbin	Current; He Jiong (1-2, 4-8); Hu Haiquan (9); Former; Wang Han (1-3); Liao Fan (2); Shen Mengchen (3); Liu Ye (4-8); Contestants as Hosts: Hu Haiquan (1-2); Chen Yufan (1); Sha Baoliang (1); Phil Chang (2); Leo Ku (3); Sun Nan (3); Hacken Lee (4); Kim Ji-mun (4); Su Yunying (4); Chao Chuan (4); Shin (4); Daichin Tana (4); Guan Zhe (4); Elvis Wang (4); Lao Lang (4); Jeff Chang (4); Angela Chang (6); Wu Tsing-fong (7); Jam Hsiao (8); Eliza Liang (8)
China (Mandarin)	مەن ناخشىچى; I Am a Singer	Ürümqi Television Station		Nadira; Memetjan; Adira
Kazakhstan	I Am a Singer Kazakhstan	Channel 31	Season 1, 2017: Kairat Tuntekov; Season 2, 2018: Roman Kim	TBA
Vietnam	I Am a Singer Vietnam			

== See also ==
- Our Sunday Night
