= Shin Jung Hyun & Yup Juns =

South Korean rock band

Shin Joong Hyun & Yup Juns
- Origin: Seoul, South Korea
- Genres: Psychedelic rock, hard rock, blues rock, progressive rock
- Years active: 1972–1975
- Label: Jigu Records
- Past members: Shin Joong-hyun; Lee Nam-yi; Kim Ho-sik

Korean name
- Hangul: 신중현과 엽전들
- Hanja: 申重鉉과 葉錢들
- Revised Romanization: Sin Junghyeongwa Yeopjeondeul
- McCune–Reischauer: Sin Chunghyŏn'gwa Yŏpchŏndŭl

Shin Joong Hyun & Yup Juns (신중현과 엽전들) was a South Korean rock band formed by Shin Joong-hyun (lead guitarist, lead vocal), Lee Nam-yi (bassist), and Kim Ho-sik (drummer). "Yup Jun" is an ad hoc romanisation of yeopjeon ("leaf coin"), a kind of old brass coin with a square hole.

The band's album Shin Jung Hyun & Yup Juns Vol. 1, released in 1974, sold more than one million copies. Its most popular song "The Beauty" (미인, Mi-in), was nicknamed "the song of thirty million" (삼천만의 애창곡, referring to South Korea's total population at the time). It was used as background music in the Lee Man-hee film A Girl Who Looks Like the Sun released that year, one of Lee's last before his death in 1975.

The band's next album, Shin Jung Hyun & Yup Juns Vol. 2, was an implicit rebuke to the dictator Park Chung-hee: according to Shin's son Shin Daechul, Park had demanded that Shin make a song praising Park, but instead Shin and his fellow band members wrote the lyrics of the album's song "Beautiful Rivers and Mountains" (아름다운 강산, Areumdaun Gangsan) about the beautiful natural landscapes of Korea. This led to increasing troubles for the band. In particular, "The Beauty" was banned on 9 July 1975, one of 45 songs banned that day by the Park dictatorship under the censorship provisions of the Yusin Constitution, and remained illegal until it was unbanned on 18 August 1987 just after the National Liberation Day celebrations. "The Beauty" was believed to have become a target for censorship not just due to the political troubles of the band itself and because of the dictatorship's general suspicion of youth culture, but because one line of the lyrics was a popular target for parodies among fans, by replacing "see" (보고, bogo) with other words:

한번보고 두번보고 자꾸만 보고싶네
Hanbeon bogo, dubeon bogo, jakkuman bogo simne
I want to see [her] once, see [her] twice, keep on seeing [her]

— Shin Joong Hyun & Yup Juns, Shin Jung Hyun & Yup Juns Vol. 1, "The Beauty"

Specifically, one parody replaced bogo with the light verb hago (하고), which could be interpreted as merely obscene ("I want to do [her] once", etc.), or could be given a political slant by interpreting it as "I want to be [president] once, be [president] twice, keep on being [president]", a reference to the 1972 removal of presidential term limits in the earlier constitution which allowed Park to continue into his second decade as president.

On 5 December 1975, the Seoul District Prosecutor's Office applied for an arrest warrant for band leader Shin Jung-hyeon on charges of violating of the Addictive Drugs Control Act (습관성의약품관리법), specifically of having allegedly used marijuana beginning in October 1972, and of having supplied 10 grams (0.35 oz) of marijuana to another singer. His trial began on 24 December, and he was forcibly committed to a mental institution for treatment. In January 1976, the Ministry of Culture and Public Information (문화공보부) announced an indefinite ban on public performances and album releases by 54 entertainers who had been linked to marijuana, Shin among them. As a result, the band broke up.

== Discography ==
- Shin Jung Hyun & Yup-Juns Vol. 1 (신중현과 엽전들 제1집, Sin Junghyeon-gwa Yeopjeondeul Je Il Jip; 1974)
- Instrumental Best (연주곡 베스트, Yeonjugok Beseuteu; 1975)
- Shin Jung Hyun & Yup-Juns Vol. 2 (신중현과 엽전들 제2집, Sin Junghyeon-gwa Yeopjeondeul Je I Jip; 1975)
