= Take 1 (TV series) =

2022 South Korean music docuseries

- Promotional poster
- Hangul: 테이크 원
- RR: Teikeu won
- MR: T'eik'ŭ wŏn
- Genre: Docuseries; Music; Reality show
- Created by: Kim Hak-min
- Written by: Yoo Jin-young
- Starring: Sumi Jo; Lena Park; Mamamoo; Jung Ji-hoon (Rain); AKMU; You Hee-yeol; Yim Jae-beom
- Country of origin: South Korea
- Original language: Korean
- No. of seasons: 1
- No. of episodes: 7

Production
- Running time: 49–65 minutes

Original release
- Network: Netflix
- Release: October 14, 2022

Take 1 (Korean: 테이크 원) is a South Korean music docuseries reality show produced by Netflix starring Sumi Jo, Lena Park, Mamamoo, Jung Ji-hoon (Rain), AKMU, You Hee-yeol and Yim Jae-beom.

== Synopsis ==
Take 1 is a show which revolves around the step-by-step process of artists creating the most meaningful performance of their careers, that started from the question "If you could perform just one stage before you die?".

== Format ==
In each episode, the show will feature a different artist from South Korea, with the goal of performing one song. Each act is given a countdown timer for when they are due to perform. In the time allocated, each act can choose where they would like to perform, and who they would like to perform with them such as dancers and other artists in one take.

== Episodes ==
No.	Title	Original release date
1	"Sumi Jo"	October 14, 2022
Not one to back down from a challenge, Sumi Jo combines classical music with Korean sounds and aesthetics for her performance of a whimsical aria.
2	"AKMU"	October 14, 2022
The sibling duo AKMU overcome many technical difficulties while preparing am ambitious production that involves skydivers and a multitude of dancers.
3	"Yim Jae-beom"	October 14, 2022
Yim Jae-beum returns to the stage after a six-year hiatus with a bare bones performance that lets music do what it does best – heal and comfort.
4	"Jung Ji-hoon (Rain)"	October 14, 2022
Jung Ji-hoon, also known by the stage name Rain, pours his heart into an elaborate spectacle as the first to perform at an iconic house.
5	"Lena Park"	October 14, 2022
Lena Park reflects on her life as she tackles a song she once deemed too difficult. With special guests in attendance, she's in for an emotional ride.
6	"You Hee-yeol"	October 14, 2022
You Hee-yul comes back to the humble venue where he and his first band got their start. The fans share their memories of growing up with his music.
7	"Mamamoo"	October 14, 2022
After two years of building separate careers, the four members of MAMAMOO come together to bring forth a mashup of their team's hit songs.

== Development ==
=== Production ===
On July 12, 2022, Yoo Ki-hwan, manager of the Netflix Korean content team, introduced Take 1 as the first Netflix Korea's music entertainment show with ensemble casting of singers Sumi Jo, Yim Jae-beom, Lena Park, Jung Ji-hoon (Rain), girl group Mamamoo, and brother and sister duo AKMU.

The show is created by Kim Hak-min of Studio Slam who were behind the production of Sing Again and Two Yoo Project – Sugar Man 3, and written by Yoo Jin-young, who previously wrote Amazing Saturday.

=== Filming ===
The singers were given the opportunity to choose time, place and audience, to sing the "best song of their life".

== Release ==
The show is expected to air in the fall of 2022. On September 15, 2022, the first teaser for the show was released along with the announcement that it will premiere on October 14.
