= Yoon Bok-hee =

South Korean singer (born 1946)

- Born: March 9, 1946 (age 79) South Korea
- Genres: Jazz; folk-rock; contemporary Christian
- Occupations: Singer-songwriter; actress
- Instruments: Vocals
- Years active: 1967–present
- Formerly of: Korean Kittens

Korean name
- Hangul: 윤복희
- Hanja: 尹福姬
- RR: Yun Bokhui
- MR: Yun Pokhŭi

Yoon Bok-hee (Korean: 윤복희; born March 9, 1946) is a South Korean singer, musical actress, and songwriter. Her father is Yoon Bu-gil, a popular comedian and her mother is Sung Kyung-ja, a well known classical ballerina. She is known for being an early adopter of the miniskirt in South Korea in the 1960s and for her songs "Everyone" and "I'll Follow You".

== Career ==
She debuted in 1951 at age five with the Nak-Rang Music Troupe in the Joong-Ang Theatre. Her first performances overseas took place in Manila and Guam in the early sixties.

== Stage performances ==
She performed on stage in musical theatre and was an Ambassador for the Musical Festival. In 2006, she starred in Maria, Maria which premiered at the New York Musical Theatre Festival on September 22 through October 15, and was one of the original twenty-five member Korean musical cast which won four awards including the Best Musical, the Best Actress, the Best Book & Lyrics and the Best Composing awards at the Korean Musical Awards in 2004. The popular musical, a story about religious fanatics trying to kill Jesus and a local prostitute Maria, continued its run for over twelve years, showing at the Geochang International Festival of Theater (KIFT) in 2014, and included performances by actress Lee So-jung, the first Korean actress to debut on Broadway in the 1990s.

== Concerts ==
On May 3, 2014, she performed with many other popular Korean entertainers at the 12th Korea Times Music Festival in the United States, just weeks after the national tragedy, the Sinking of MV Sewol, and thousands of yellow commemorative ribbons were passed out to the audience.

== Korean Kittens ==
Yoon Bok-hee was the leader of the Korean Kittens that toured with Bob Hope and the USO to American Army Vietnam War bases in 1966. The Korean Kittens went international in 1964 after being on the BBC television's Tonight programme in Great Britain, singing Can't Buy Me Love by the Beatles. On January 6, 1967 they arrived in the United States to tour. Many compared them to The Kim Sisters, another Korean girl group. Korean Kittens' US shows included The Reg Varney Revue in 1972, The Mike Douglas Show in 1967, The Bob Hope Vietnam Christmas Show in 1966 and The Wahlparty 65 TV Special in 1965.
