= Kim:kyungho 1997 =

Album by Kim Kyung Ho

Kim:Kyungho 1997

Studio album by Kim Kyung Ho
- Released: 1997
- Recorded: 1997
- Genre: Rock
- Length: N/A
- Labels: Samsung Music

Kim Kyung Ho chronology
Kim Kyung Ho (1995)	Kim:Kyungho 1997 (1997)	00:00:1998 (1998)

Kim:Kyungho 1997 is the second studio album from rock singer Kim Kyung Ho, released on Samsung Music in 1997. The album, which fared far better than its predecessor in sales, is best known for the track "People Who Make Me Sad" which hit #1 in the charts in South Korea. Other popular songs from the album include "Forbidden Love" and "Aria of Sad Souls".

== Track listing ==
1. Dracula
2. Fate (운명)
3. Aria of Sad Souls (For Elise) (슬픈 영혼의 아리아)
4. The Lord of All Creation (만물의 영장)
5. AID & AIDS
6. People Who Make Me Sad (나를 슬프게 하는 사람들)
7. Our Son
8. Late Regret (때늦은 후회)
9. Forbidden Love (금지된 사랑)
10. Last Prayer (마지막 기도)
11. To Pinocchio (피노키오에게)
12. Waiting For You (너를 기다리며)
