= Kim Kyung-ho =

South Korean singer (born 1971)

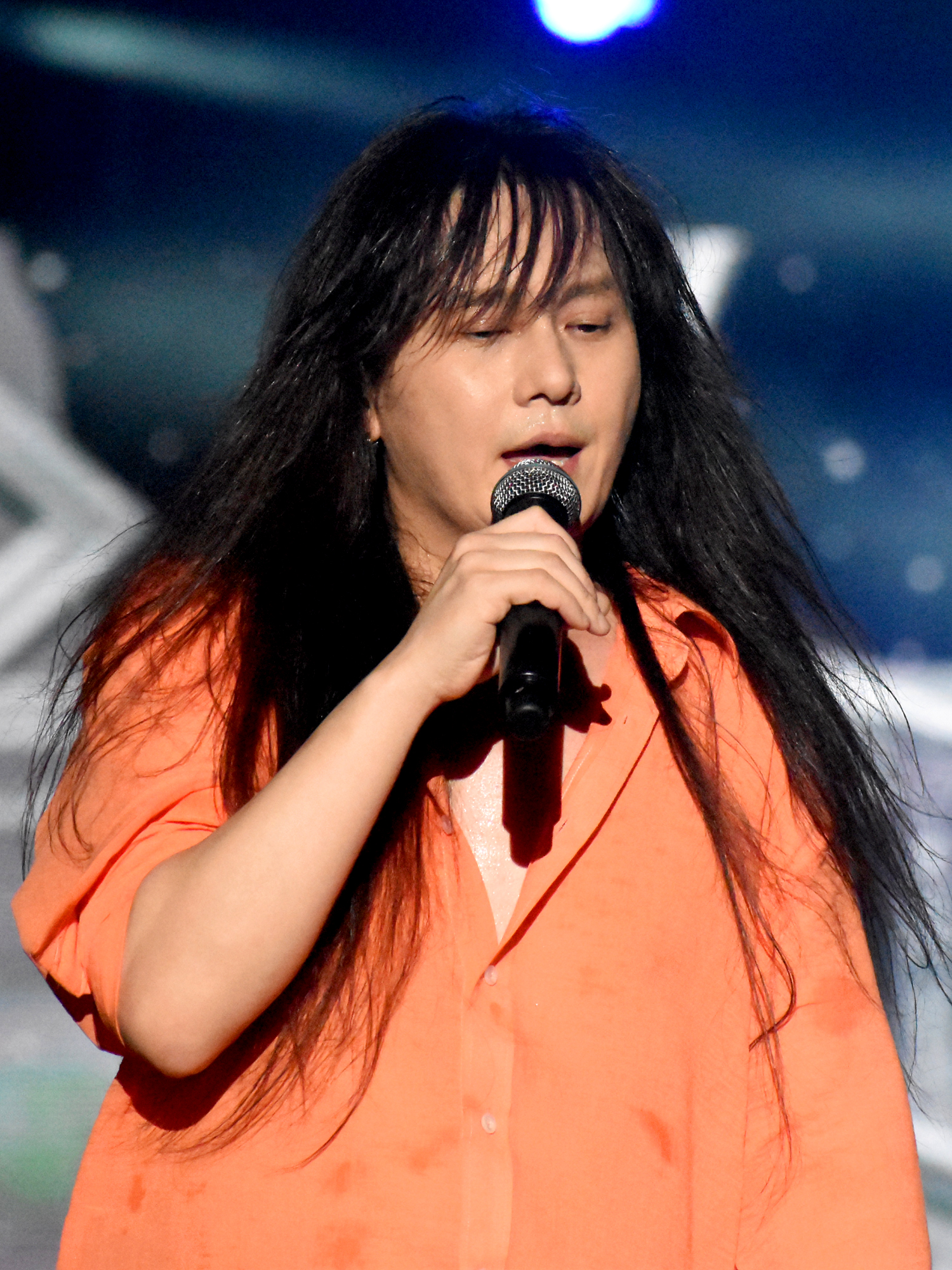
- Kim at the Busan Sea Festival, August 2018

Background information
- Born: June 7, 1971 (age 55)
- Origin: Mokpo, South Korea
- Genres: Hard rock, heavy metal, Korean ballad
- Occupation: Singer-songwriter
- Instruments: Vocals, guitar, piano
- Years active: 1989–present
- Website: Official website

Korean name
- Hangul: 김경호
- Hanja: 金慶皓
- RR: Gim Gyeongho
- MR: Kim Kyŏngho

Kim Kyung-ho (Korean: 김경호; born June 7, 1971) is a South Korean singer who is often referred to as a "legend of rock" for his efforts in bringing rock music to South Korea and his four octave vocal range. He makes frequent appearances on South Korean variety shows.

== Biography ==
Kim was born in Mokpo, South Korea. He is known as the National Rock Star with charismatic presence on stage and later on called as Rock Unnie or National Sister because of his long hair and feminine look.

He made his first appearance on Korea's music scene in 1989 on an annual competition for talented youths hosted by KBS. In 1991, he also joined on MBC's University Music Festival where he got bronze award for his self-composed song Long Goodbye which was also included on his first album.

His debut album released in 1995 entitled Kim Kyung Ho, and while not commercially successful earned him some recognition among Korean rock music fans. His more novel second album, Kim:kyungho 1997 was much better received and the song "People Who Make Me Sorrow" topped on music charts which made him popular. Since then, he rose to mainstream success and released numerous hit songs such as "Forbidden Love", "Heartless", "Until the day we love beautifully", "My Love, Even In The Heavens", "Though I Love You", "Wine", and "Father".

He also collaborated to the soundtrack of the 2002 Korean drama series Empress Myeongseong and 2004 (of which he covered Within Temptation song; "Mother Earth").

After Several years of popularity things took a downturn for him in 2003 when he was diagnosed with cord nodules. In 2007, Kim was diagnosed with avascular necrosis.

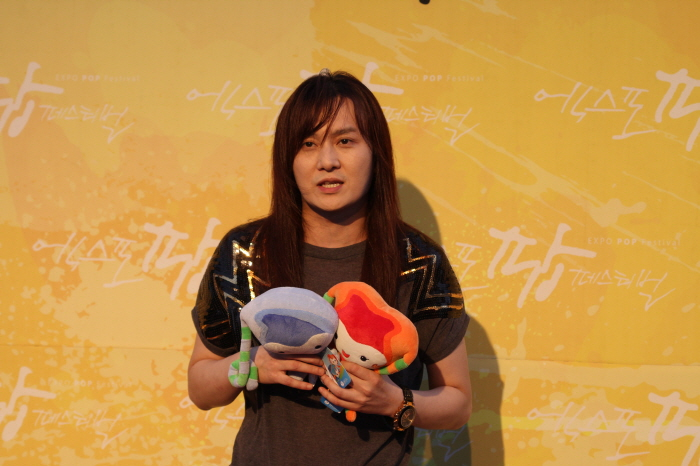
Kim in 2014

Kim Kyung-ho renewed his popularity through his participation in variety shows, and numerous appearances in televised singing competitions as part of an entourage of industry-veteran vocalists. In September 2011, he joined the hit Show I Am a Singer and with his long hair and dance moves, he gained the title as "Rock Unnie". He was the fifth artist to graduate from the show, doing so in the final round. His popularity continued as he appeared on other variety shows such as Hidden Singer, Happy Together, and Running Man, In 2014, he joined the television music competition Immortal Songs 2: Singing the Legend, where he won the trophy several times.In May 15 and 22, 2016, he appeared on episodes 59–60 of the singing competition King of Mask Singer.

Kim Kyung-ho married on November 8, 2014, with a Japanese woman working in finances. In August 2018, Kim announced that the couple had been divorced since June 2018.

== Discography ==
=== Studio albums ===
Year	Title	Release date	Track list
1995	Kim Kyung Ho	December 1, 1995	1. Last Prayer (마지막 기도); 2. Long Separation (긴 이별); 3. Freeman (자유인); 4. First Separation (첫 이별); 5. Being A Man (남자라는 건); 6. Life (목숨); 7. For the First Time (나 이제서야); 8. The Worst Day (최악의 날); 9. A Boy Under the False Accusation (누명쓴 아이); 10. Fall Asleep on the Raining Road (비가 오는 거리에서 잠든다)
1997	Kim:kyungho 1997	June 30, 1997	1. Dracula; 2. Fate; 3. Aria of the Sad Soul (for Elise); 4. The Lord of All Creation; 5. AID & AIDS; 6. People Who Make Me Sorrow; 7. Our Son; 8. Late Regret; 9. Forbidden Love; 10. Last Prayer; 11. To Pinocchio; 12. Waiting for You
1998	Kim Kyung Ho III – 00:00:1998	August 31, 1998	1. Shout; 2. Fly High to Follow Your Dreams; 3. Grief of Farewell; 4. The Name That I'd Call Out with My Last Breath; 5. The Voice of Conscience; 6. Unfullfilled Love; 7. The Castle of Eternity; 8. Exodus; 9. Vesuvius; 10. My Love, Even in the Heavens; 11. Higher to the Top
1999	Kim Kyung Ho IV – For 2000 AD	April 30, 1999	1. For 2000 AD; 2. Through It Away! (버려!); 3. Inerasable Trace (화인); 4. Love Sadder than the Separation (이별보다 슬픈 사랑); 5. 1052; 6. Non-Stop; 7. When My Love Calls You (내 그리움 널 부를 때); 8. Love That We Can Never Achieve (이룰 수 없는 사랑); 9. Come To Me (내게로 와); 10. Heartlessness (비정); 11. Rock 'N Roll; 12. Till I Beautifully Love You (To You; Forbidden Love
2000	Kim kyungho-5th	July 1, 2000	1. escape 2. Wine (迗 人); 3. Blood; 4. Delete; 5. Dear Freddie; 6. Asparagus; 7. Masquerade; 8. Always Waiting For You; 9. Shadow of My Passionate Affections; 10. Good-bye to my love 11. Tragedy
2001	Kim Kyung Ho VI – The Life	August 13, 2001	1. Survival Game; 2. Shout; 3. To you precious 4. The Life; 5. Rock The Night; 6. sacrifice 7. Yesterday; 8. My All; 9. I loved it but 10. Sacrifice (Instrumental); 11. Sacrifice (music video)
2003	Kim Kyung Ho 7 – Open Your Eyes	August 11, 2003	1. OASIS; 2. Father; 3. Now; 4. Wisdom for you 5. Time Is Up; 6. Open Your Eyes; 7. Break Free; 8. I would rather 9. To the last one (To You); 10. Hi; 11. Now (Club Remix Ver 1.0)
2004	Kim Kyung Ho 7.5 – 시작 : How	July 12, 2004	1. Man on the Silver Mountain (Remake); 2. How?; 3. Please Forgive Me; 4. Leave it 5. I'll give you my love (Remake); 6. Everybody; 7. I can not talk. (Remake); 8. Night at night (Remake); 9. Judgment Day; 10. Come to me (Live); 11. Oasis (Live); 12. I love you (Live); 13. Now (Live) With Park Sang Min; 14. Father (Remix); 15. Wisdom for you (Remastering); 16. Remastering; 17. My All (Remastering)
2006	Kim Kyung Ho 8 – Unlimited	February 23, 2006	1. Rock And Light; 2. Warrior; 3. Love, in pain 4. I believe you loved it.; 5. Guardian Angel; 6. Summer Candles; 7. Party; 8. My farewell 9. A breathing love 10. Working for the Weekend; 11. Season of Loss; 12. Road Movie; 13. Summer Candles (Radio Version)
2007	Kim Kyung Ho Vol. 9 – Infinity	November 30, 2007	1. Poison; 2. As if it were you 3. Habit; 4. Portrait of a young day 5. Sad Song; 6. I, Who Cannot Forget You; 7. Insomnia; 8. Rain is Who You Are and Flow; 9. Nanana; 10. Make It Go Away; 11. Tunnel

=== Mini albums ===
Year	Title	Release date	Track list
2008	Kim Kyung Ho – Another Story"	February 29, 2008	1. 마치 너인 것처럼; 2. 널 잊지 못하는 내가 (Live); 3. 독 (毒) (Live); 4. 마치 너인 것처럼 (Live); 5. 마치 너인 것처럼
2009	Kim Kyung Ho – Chapter Zero"	April 10, 2009	1. Still Wanting You; 2. People Who Make Me Sorrow; 3. Reach for the Sky; 4. Too Hard Too Furious; 5. Come to Me
2009	Kim Kyung Ho 9.5 – Alive	June 22, 2009	1. Face to Face; 2. I want to bring her back (데려오고 싶다); 3. Promise U 4. Misty Rain (는개비); 5. The Story of Rain And You (Featuring Park Wan-kyu) (비와 당신의 이야기); 6. Rush (질주)
2013	Kim Kyung Ho 10 – 공존	February 22, 2013	1. If you can hear love 2. I wait for you 3. Promise; 4. Sunset; 5. Tears of the Moon; 6. Get On Your Feet; 7. If you hear love (Inst.)

=== Single albums ===
Year	Title	Release date	Track list
2008	Kim Kyung Ho -너를 지켜줄 거야	September 19, 2008	1. 너를 지켜줄 거야 (법무부 캠페인 광고 삽입곡)
2008	Kim Kyung Ho -질주	October 9, 2008	1. 질주
2009	Kim Kyung Ho -Fly Away	March 23, 2009	1. Fly Away (메리 제트 오프닝 타이틀)
2017	Kim Kyung Ho 10 – Part 2 공존	May 15, 2017	1. 시간의 숲 2. Don't Be Quiet
2018	FOURever : Kim Kyung Ho, Kim Jong Seo, Kim Tae Won and Park Wan Kyu	March 22, 2018	1. Promise

=== Live albums ===
Year	Title	Release date
1997	Kim Kyung Ho: Live	Late 1997
2002	Kim Kyung Ho – Best & Live	January 2002
2014	KIMKYUNGHO 20th ANNIVERSARY ALBUM	October 2014

== Filmography ==
=== Television ===
Year	Title	Role
2011	I Am a Singer 1	Contestant, episodes 26–40
2012	Hidden Singer Pilot	Contestant, episode 2
2012	I Am a Singer 1	Contestant, episodes 41–47
2012	Top Band 2	Judge
2013	Dancing with the Stars 3	Contestant, episodes 1–12
2014	Immortal Songs	Contestant, episodes 162-164 and 167
2015	Immortal Songs	Contestant, episodes 181-182 and 185
2015	King of Mask Singer	Contestant as "The Last Samurai", episodes 8,10 and 11
2015	I Am a Singer 3	Contestant
2016	Duet Song Festival 1	Contestant w/ Han Byung Ho, episodes 15, 18, 19 and 30
2016	Fantastic Duo Season 1	Contestant Episodes 29 and 30
2016	Immortal Songs	Contestant, episodes 242–243, 247, 258, 268, 273, 283
2016	King of Mask Singer	Contestant as "The Lamp Genie", episodes 59–60
2016	Duet Song Festival	Contestant with Han Byung-ho, episodes 15 and 18–19
2016	Vocal War:Voice of God	Contestant, episodes 15 -16
2017	Immortal Songs	Contestant, episodes 292-293, 306, 319 and 325
2018	Hidden Singer 5	Comeback Special-Guest (Jun.10) and Ep. 6 Panelist (Jul.22)
2018	Immortal Songs	Contestant, episodes 340, 345, 350, 360

== Awards and nominations ==
Award	Year	Category	Nominee / nominated work	Result	Ref.
Golden Disc Awards	1997	Album Bonsang	Kim:kyungho 1997	Won	
Golden Disc Awards	1998	Album Bonsang	00:00:1998 Kyung-Ho Kim	Won	
Golden Disc Awards	1999	Popularity Award	Kyung-Ho Kim IV	Won	
MAMA Awards	2000	Best Rock Performance	"Wine" (와인)	Nominated	
MAMA Awards	2001	Best Rock Performance	"Sacrifice" (희생)	Nominated	
MBC Campus Song Festival	1992	Bronze Prize	"Long Goodbye" (긴 이별)	Won	
SBS Gayo Daejeon	1997	Top Ten Singer Award	Kim Kyung-ho	Won	
SBS Gayo Daejeon	1998	Special Award	Kim Kyung-ho	Won	
Seoul Music Awards	1997	Bonsang	"People Who Make Me Sad" (나를 슬프게 한 사람들)	Won	
Seoul Music Awards	1998	Bonsang	"My Love in Heaven" (나의 사랑 천상에서도)	Won	
Seoul Music Awards	2000	Special Award	Kim Kyung-ho	Won	
