= Kim Kyung Ho (album) =

Studio album by Kim Kyung Ho
- Released: 1995
- Recorded: 1994
- Genre: Rock
- Length: N/A
- Label: Music Design Records

Kim Kyung Ho chronology
| Kim Kyung Ho (1995) | Kim:kyungho 1997 (1997) |

Kim Kyung Ho is the self-titled debut album from rock singer Kim Kyung Ho, released on Music Design Records in 1995. The album did poorly on initial release due to the lack of interest in rock music during the 1990s in South Korea

== Track listing ==
1. Last Prayer (마지막 기도)
2. Long Separation (긴 이별)
3. Freeman (자유인)
4. First Separation (첫 이별)
5. Being A Man (남자라는 건)
6. Life (목숨)
7. For the First Time (나 이제서야)
8. The Worst Day (최악의 날)
9. A Boy Under the False Accusation (누명쓴 아이)
10. Fall Asleep on the Raining Road (비가 오는 거리에서 잠든다)
