= Jenny Cho =

Jenny Cho (Jenny Jo) (Korean: 제니조; Korean name: 조효빈; born August 21, 1983), better known by her on-air name, Jenny Jo, is a second generation Korean-American broadcaster.

Jo (Cho) is known for her work as a television MC/host and broadcast journalist, radio personality, and voice actor.

Though Jo (Cho) is originally from Los Angeles, California, she is currently based in South Korea working at domestically and internationally recognized stations like Arirang TV and Radio and KBS World Radio and TV.

== Background and education ==
Jenny Jo (Cho) was born in Los Angeles, California and raised in Southern California. She grew up amid a traditional Korean upbringing in America, where she learned the language, history, and culture at home. Jenny Jo's mother is an entrepreneur, and her father is a former vice-chairman of a local Korean American Federation in the U.S., who is well respected for his dedication to the community.

She received her B.A. degree in communication as well as social psychology from the University of California, Davis. She was active on campus, most notably, as a member of Alpha Kappa Psi, the oldest and largest professional co-ed business fraternity, founded at New York University.

After her university career, she continued her education in broadcasting. She also attended the Los Angeles School of Translation and Interpretation in order to receive her license as a court translator and interpreter.

She also completed Graduate school at Yonsei University with a Masters on East Asian/Korean Studies.

== Career ==
Jenny Jo (Cho) pursued one of her several passions, psychological studies, and worked as a behavioral therapist, working with children with autism after her receiving her undergraduate degree. Jo (Cho) concurrently worked towards her broadcast career since her early college years.

Jo (Cho) then turned to Korea in 2009 for the next stage in her career as she first started at Arirang Television and Radio as a weather forecast reporter and later as a morning world news anchor. Jo (Cho) also reported daily business news and world news on the radio show, Riding Home, hosted by Kim Juweon. Jo (Cho) covers various domestic and international news, culture, entertainment, and health.

She continued her broadcast career as a host of the television program, Korea Top Ten, and as a reporter for entertainment news on the program Korea Today.

Jenny Jo (Cho) then went on to host a morning radio program called Morning Call, Arirangradio.com/morningcall in Korea at Arirang TV and Radio an international English-language based network, in the country's capital, Seoul. She was also the host for Arirang Radio's morning news magazine program, Sunnysideup, at Arirangradio.com/sunnysideup.

Jo (Cho)later hosted a morning program by her name, The Jenny Jo Show, at Arirang Radio. She has continued her work in broadcasting as a voice actor and host at other broadcast stations in Korea like Educational Broadcasting System (EBS) where she co-hosted with Lee Hyun-Suk on "입이 트 이는 영어" and guested on "Morning Special". She currently also co-hosts "Seoul Calling" on KBS World Radio.

In addition to her work in broadcasting, she continues her work as a voice actor. Notable projects include domestic and international commercials and animation, including the voice of "Harry" on the popular children's animation, "Pororo."

== Modeling and beauty pageantry ==
At the age of 4, Jo (Cho) received her first crown as Little Miss Korea. She then went on to win and place for several other titles including the 18th "Jr. Miss Korea pageant", held at the Grand Hotel, which she won and was crowned Jr. Miss Korea in addition to receiving Best Costume Award and Best Smile Award.

Jo (Cho) last graced the stage where she was crowned as a beauty queen on the 'Miss Asia USA' court, in 2010. She represented Korea as 'Miss Korea USA' competing with delegates from all over the US and Asian regions to reign on the beauty queen's court. She earned 'Miss Asia USA' 1st runner-up and 'Miss popularity'.

Jenny Jo (Cho) pursued a career in commercial and print modeling since a young age. Her modeling gigs include a Yamaha Piano commercial, in Los Angeles, during her primary years at age 6. She and went on to compete in the Children's Model Contest in Los Angeles at the age of 11, which she placed first and also received Ms. Photogenic and Ms. Popularity awards. Soon after the contest, she was cast for a Disneyland commercial, which was filmed at the Disneyland in Anaheim, for the Tokyo Disneyland in Japan. Early on she was signed, under a conditional contract, by Elite Model for the print department for a short period. The following year, she was cast for a Honda Accord television commercial, filmed in Barstow, California in addition to Honda's print ad, filmed on set in Los Angeles.

== Other activities ==
In 2015, Jo (Cho) co-emceed with Sam Hammington at the 42nd LA Korean Festival. She also co-hosted the Miss Asia USA pageant with David Millburn in 2011. Jo (Cho) has expanded her work as a host for both international and local and events; to name a few previous works: The Opening of Korea-town Crime Prevention Patrol, at the Korean-American Federation District Building, in 2006 (LA 코리아 타운 방범 순찰단 출범식 의 MC), MC at Los Angeles Dance Academy’s “Celebration of Korean Liberation Day,” at the Wilshire Ebell Theatre, in 2007 (LA 김응화 무용단 “해방의 축전” 공연 의 MC), MC for The 45th Annual Fundraiser for the Korean-American Federation of L.A., which took place at the Wilshire Grand Hotel in 2007 (LA 한인회 창립 45주년 기념 기금 모금 행사 의 MC), and MC for the Korean American Garment District Association's New Office Inauguration, at the Wilshire Radisson Hotel in 2006 (미주 한인 봉제 협회 총연의밤 행사 의 MC). Jo (Cho) has a background in dance: ballet, jazz, hiphop, and predominantly in Korean dance, which she has performed since she was 9 years old.
