= Yim Jae-beom =

South Korean retired singer (born 1962)

- Born: October 14, 1962 (age 64); Seoul, South Korea
- Occupation: Singer
- Years active: 1986–2026
- Spouse: Song Nam-yeong (m. 2001; died 2017)
- Children: 1
- Musical career
- Genre: Rock
- Instrument: Vocals
- Formerly of: Sinawe; Asiana; Rock in Korea

Korean name
- Hangul: 임재범
- Hanja: 任宰範
- RR: Im Jaebeom
- MR: Im Chaebŏm

Yim Jae-beom (Korean: 임재범; also spelled Yim Jae-bum; born October 14, 1962) is a South Korean retired singer who is widely regarded as one of South Korea's best vocalists.

He debuted in 1986 as the vocalist for the heavy metal band Sinawe. After recording with other bands, including Asiana and Rock in Korea, Yim released his first solo album in 1991. On January 4, 2026, it was announced Yim Jae-beom would be retiring after his final concert on May 20, and the release of his eighth full album.

== Career ==
In 2011, Yim joined the cast of I Am a Singer (나는 가수다) where he placed first two times. On May 23, 2011, I Am a Singer announced that Yim would be taking a temporary leave from the show.

He released a new solo album, "Day by Day" (날이 갈수록) which reached No.2 on Hanteo Daily Charts on September 19.

He also took part in the OST of the successful Korean drama City Hunter with the song "Love" (사랑; Sarang).

In 2013, Yim released a duet with South Korean singer, Ali, titled "I Love You".

== Personal life ==
Yim was married to musical actress Song Nam-yeong from 2001 until her death from cancer in 2017. The couple has one daughter named Ji-soo.

== Discography ==
=== Studio albums ===
Title	Album details	Peak chart positions		Sales
Title	Album details	KOR RIAK	KOR Circle (Note: The Circle Chart, formerly known as the Gaon Chart, was established in 2010.)	Sales
On The Turning Away	Released: October 1, 1991; Label: Shinsegye Sound; Formats: CD, cassette	No data	—	KOR: 600,000
The Flight (비상)	Released: July 1, 1997; Label: DMR; Formats: CD, cassette	No data	—	
Confession (고해)	Released: September 1, 1998; Label: DMR; Formats: CD, cassette	29	—	KOR: 13,629
Story of Two Years	Released: May 16, 2000; Label: Warner Music Korea; Formats: CD, cassette	9	—	KOR: 286,721
Coexistence (공존)	Released: October 12, 2004; Label: EMI; Formats: CD, cassette	7	—	KOR: 41,761
To...	Released: July 11, 2012; Label: Yedang Entertainment; Formats: LP, CD, digital download	No data	9	KOR: 5,281
Seven,	Released: October 22, 2022; Label: Blueseed Company; Formats: CD, digital download	No data	97	KOR: 623
"—" denotes releases that did not chart or were not released in that region.

=== Live albums ===
Title	Album details	Peak chart positions		Sales
Title	Album details	KOR RIAK	KOR Circle	Sales
Live & Life	Released: January 1, 2006; Label: Iset Communications; Formats: CD	25	—	KOR: 3,766
Geotdabomyeon (걷다보면)	Released: December 2, 2013; Label: C&T Company; Formats: CD, digital download	No data	16	KOR: 1,639
"—" denotes releases that did not chart or were not released in that region.

=== Remake albums ===
Title	Album details	Peak chart positions	Sales
Title	Album details	KOR Circle	Sales
Free (풀이)	Released: December 8, 2011; Label: Kakao Entertainment; Formats: CD, digital download	3	KOR: 9,569
After the Sunset: White Night	Released: November 27, 2015; Label: Windmill Media; Formats: LP, CD, digital download	14	KOR: 6,677

== Filmography ==
=== Television shows ===
Year	Title	Role	Notes	Ref.
2023	Begin Again - Intermission	Cast member	spin-off	
2023	Sing Again	Judge	Season 3	

=== Web shows ===
Year	Title	Role	Ref.
2022	Take 1	Participant	

== Awards and nominations ==
Year	Award	Category	Work	Result	Ref.
2011	Mnet Asian Music Awards	Best OST	"Love" (City Hunter)	Nominated	
