= Shin Daechul =

South Korean musician and songwriter (born 1967)

- Born: February 16, 1967 (age 59); Seoul, South Korea
- Occupations: Songwriter; Musician; Singer
- Years active: 1985–present
- Children: 1
- Musical career
- Genres: Rock, heavy metal
- Instrument: Guitar
- Years active: 1985–present
- Member of: Sinawe
- Formerly of: D.O.A.

Korean name
- Hangul: 신대철
- RR: Sin Daecheol
- MR: Sin Taech'ŏl

Shin Daechul (Korean: 신대철) is a South Korean musician and songwriter. He is best known as leader and guitarist of Sinawe, who are considered one of the first heavy metal bands in South Korea. He is the son of Shin Jung-hyeon, who is often called "the Godfather of Korean rock music," and the older brother of fellow musicians Shin Yunchul and Shin Seokchul.

== Career ==
Shin Daechul was born on February 16, 1967, as the oldest of three sons. He began to learn guitar from his father in fourth grade following his father's release from prison for marijuana possession. "After [my father] got busted, he was always at home, so I had a good opportunity to learn from him."

At 18 years old, Shin's band Sinawe released their first album in 1986. It sold 400,000 copies and they took to the forefront of Korean heavy metal. Through two decades, many now renowned musicians such as Seo Taiji, Kim Jong-seo, Bada Kim and Yim Jae-beom improved their musical abilities while members of Sinawe.

He contributed guitar to "Rock'n Roll Dance" on Seo Taiji and Boys' 1992 self-titled debut album.

Together with Boohwal leader Kim Tae Won and Baekdoosan's Kim Do Kyun, Shin worked on the guitar musical project D.O.A. and released the album Dead or Alive in 2003.

In 2011, Shin was a judge for the KBS2 musician contest show Top Band. At the August 2013 City Break Festival, Daechul and his two brothers performed with their father.

Following the Sinking of the MV Sewol in April 2014, Shin was one of several artists that helped publish original music compositions of students that died in the disaster; releasing work that Park Su-hyeon had saved to his computer.

In October 2014, Daechul made headlines when he accused Asan Medical Center of malpractice that led to the death of his friend Shin Hae-chul and vowed to avenge him. At the urging of friends, Hae-chul's family stopped his cremation on short notice and requested an autopsy. In March 2015, Songpa police found that Shin Hae-chul did die from medical malpractice.

Outspoken against record labels and online streaming services for taking too large a share of revenue in relation to that the musicians earn, which he says will cause the Korean music industry to collapse, Shin formed the Barun Music Cooperative. The cooperative is dedicated to protecting musicians' interests and receiving better working conditions. Shin was a featured speaker at the University of California, Berkeley on December 2, 2014.

== Private life ==
Shin had a son, Dong-joo, in March 2003.
