= Hidden Singer =

International music game show

Hidden Singer is an international music game show franchise. It is originated of the South Korean program of the same name, developed by JTBC.

== International versions ==
– Currently airing
– No longer airing
– Undetermined

Country/Region	Local title	Network(s)	Broadcast period	Host(s)
China	Hidden Singer 谁是大歌神	Zhejiang Television	Season 1: March 6, 2016 – May 15, 2016	Chen Huan
Italy	Hidden Singer Italia	NOVE	Season 1: February 23, 2017 – March 30, 2017	Federico Russo
South Korea	Hidden Singer (original version)	JTBC	Season 1: March 16, 2013 – June 22, 2013; Season 2: October 12, 2013 – January 25, 2014; Season 3: August 2, 2014 – December 6, 2014; Season 4: October 3, 2015 – January 16, 2016; Season 5: June 17, 2018 – October 7, 2018; Season 6: July 31, 2020 – November 13, 2020; Season 7: August 19, 2022 – November 18, 2022; Season 8: March 31, 2026 – June 16, 2026	Jun Hyun-moo
Thailand	Hidden Singer Thailand เสียงลับจับไมค์	Channel 3	Season 1: April 18, 2015 – July 25, 2015; Season 2: April 23, 2016 – July 16, 2016	Thanakrit Panichwid; Premanat Suwannanon
United States	Hidden Singer	NBC	Planned but never aired	
Vietnam	Ca sĩ giấu mặt	THVL	Season 1: October 11, 2015 – February 14, 2016; Season 2: October 17, 2016 – January 22, 2017; Season 3: May 27, 2017 – September 30, 2017	Trường Giang

== See also ==
- List of television game show franchises
