= Insooni =

South Korean singer (born 1957)

Insooni (인순이)
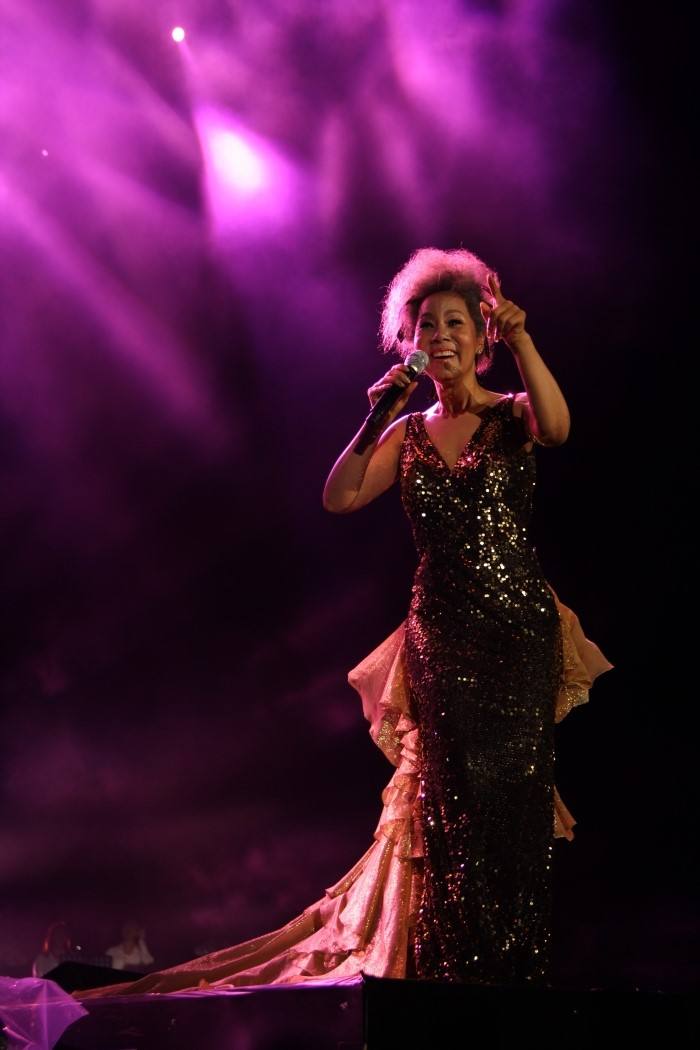
- Insooni at the Expo 2012 in Yeosu

Background information
- Born: Kim In-soon (김인순); April 5, 1957 (age 69); Baegui-ri, Cheongsan-myeon, Pocheon County, Gyeonggi Province, South Korea (now Yeoncheon County, Gyeonggi Province, South Korea)
- Genres: R&B, Gospel
- Occupation: Singer
- Years active: 1978–present
- Labels: Sosob Blue Sky; Sony Music Entertainment; MAPPS Entertainment

- Insooni
- Hangul: 김인순
- Hanja: 金仁順
- RR: Gim Insun
- MR: Kim Insun

Stage name
- Hangul: 인순이
- Hanja: 仁順이
- RR: Insuni
- MR: Insuni

Kim In-soon (Korean: 김인순; born April 5, 1957), known professionally as Insooni (인순이), is a South Korean singer who made her debut in 1978 as a member of Hee Sisters (희자매). Since then, she has recorded a total of 19 albums, 14 of them full-length albums. She is acclaimed as South Korea's R&B diva, having garnered a wide range of fans over her 45+ year career. She is one of the few South Korean singers to have performed at Carnegie Hall in New York City and has earned several top prizes from South Korean music awards. She is distinguished by her rich, throaty voice with wide vocal range on stage. She was born to a South Korean mother and an African American father, who served in the U.S. military in South Korea and was brought up by her mother alone, with the assistance of Pearl S. Buck International's child sponsorship program.

== Early life and education ==
Insooni was born to a South Korean mother and an African American father in April 1957 in Pocheon, Gyeonggi Province and her upbringing was fraught with difficulties from discrimination against foreigners, which was severe during this time in South Korea. Insooni has commented that "while attending school I felt like I was dirty compared to my classmates." In-Soon graduated from Cheongsan Middle School of Yeoncheon, Gyeonggi Province and having had enough of the difficulties did not continue her education through high school. She has said that overcoming the difficulties came by singing.

== Career ==
In 1978, Insooni made her debut with the girl group Hee Sisters but South Korean public opinion doubted that a girl group could be successful in South Korea. The Hee sisters' time allowed Insooni to show off her skills such as eloquent dance but the interest she attracted was merely that of outward appearance. In 1980, Fate (인연), Insooni's solo release debuted. 1983, with the age of disco setting in, If it's night, every night (밤이면 밤마다), saw her release a hit that rose and remained at number 7 on KBS charts through 1984, she rose immensely in popularity.

She has also released a live album of Contemporary Christian Music, which was launched on August 11, 2006. It included Korean versions of the classic Christian songs "Amazing Grace" and "How Great Thou Art" (주 하나님 지으신 모든 세계), and other songs such as "Jesus" (찬양해) and "Through Christ".

In 2007, she got special attention for her performance of the song "A Goose's Dream".

== Personal life ==
Insooni has one daughter, Saein Park, also known as Jasmine, born 1994, who attended Seoul International School as a high honor student and graduated from Stanford University. Her father is Park Kyung-bae. She is three-quarters Korean and quarter African-American.

Insooni is a Catholic. Her baptismal name is Cecilia.

On April 29, 2023, Insooni was appointed by Prime Minister Han Duck-soo to the new Multicultural Youth Families Support Council in an effort to create 230 family centers and 527 Korean classes for school-age children, and strengthen career guidance such as career consulting, college student mentoring, and vocational training services for multicultural and mixed-race middle and high school students.

== Discography ==
- Destiny (인연) (1980)
- The Person Who Has To Leave (떠나야할 그 사람) (1981)
- Only Sadness Remains (슬픔만 남아 있어요) (1982)
- At Night, Every Night-Desire (밤이면 밤마다／욕망) (1983)
- Beautiful Korea (아름다운 우리나라/여기가 어디냐) (1984)
- Letter Of Tears (눈물의편지) (1985)
- Beetle on vinyl (비닐장판 위의 딱정벌레) (1987)
- As Ever, The Distance (그 어느 거리로) (1988)
- Turning Point (1989)
- Woman (女子) (1991)
- Hits of Insooni Vol.1 (1992)
- The Queen Of Soul (1996)
- From Deep Within My Soul (가스펠 1) (1997)
- My Turn (2001)
- A To Z (2004)
- Remix Party with DJ Oga (2006)
- Goose’s Dream/ Dreaming for Everyone (2007)
- Anthology 97-08 (2008)
- Insooni (2009)
- Uppercut (2011)
- Legend (30th Anniversary Concert, 2 Discs) (2011)
- Umbrella (2013)
- Pinocchio (피노키오) (2015)

== Filmography ==
=== Television shows ===
Year	Title	Role	Notes	Ref.
2021	Hello Trot	Judge		
2021	The Age of Destiny	Cast Member		
2023	Golden Girls	Cast Member		
