= Big Mama King =

South Korean singer

BMK
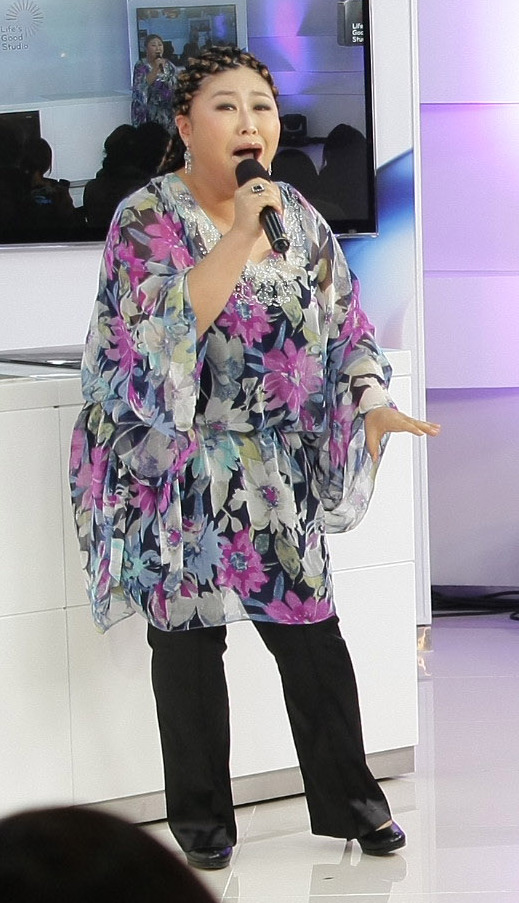
- BMK in 2010

Background information
- Also known as: Big Mama King
- Born: September 30, 1973 (age 52); Sokcho, Gangwon-do, South Korea
- Genres: Ballad, R&B
- Occupation: Singer

- Korean name
- Hangul: 김현정
- RR: Gim Hyeonjeong
- MR: Kim Hyŏnjŏng

Kim Hyeon-jeong (Korean: 김현정, born September 30, 1973), professionally known as BMK or Big Mama King, is a South Korean singer known for her powerful voice.

== Discography ==
=== Studio albums ===
| Title | Album details | Peak chart positions | Sales |
| Title | Album details | KOR | Sales |
|---|---|---|---|
| No More Music | Released: October 21, 2003; Label: Sony Music; Formats: CD, cassette | 17 | KOR: 19,297+ |
| Soul Food | Released: January 17, 2005; Label: Sony Music; Formats: CD, cassette | 22 | KOR: 8,177+ |
| 999.9 | Released: March 6, 2007; Label: O2 Record; Formats: CD, cassette | 9 | KOR: 5,028+ |
