= Shin Joong-hyun =

South Korean rock guitarist and singer-songwriter

- Born: January 4, 1938 (age 88), Seoul, South Korea
- Other name: Jackie (Jacky/ Hicky) Shin
- Occupations: Songwriter; singer; guitarist
- Years active: 1957–present
- Spouse: Myeong Jeong-gang (died 2018)
- Children: 3
- Awards: Bogwan Order of Cultural Merit (2010)
- Musical career
- Genres: Psychedelic rock; folk rock; pop; soul
- Instruments: Vocals; guitar
- Label: Jigu Records

Korean name
- Hangul: 신중현
- Hanja: 申重鉉
- RR: Sin Junghyeon
- MR: Sin Chunghyŏn

Shin Joong-hyun (Korean: 신중현, pronounced [ɕind͡ʑuŋçʌn] or [ɕin] [t͡ɕuŋçʌn]; born January 4, 1938), also transliterated as Shin Jung-hyeon or Sin Junghyeon, is a South Korean rock guitarist and singer-songwriter often referred to as Korea's "Godfather of Rock." A pioneer of Korean rock music, Shin is known for forming South Korea's first rock band, Add4, in 1962 and for being at the forefront of the country's psychedelic rock scene of the 1960s and 1970s. He wrote his most famous song, "Beautiful Rivers and Mountains," in protest of the military dictatorship of Park Chung Hee in 1972. Shin was later imprisoned and tortured by Park's regime, and his music was banned until the 1980s. He experienced a resurgence in popularity in the 1990s and has since received numerous accolades recognizing his contributions to South Korean popular music.

== Early life ==
Shin Joong-hyun was born in Seoul in 1938, during the Japanese occupation of Korea. His mother died when he was a child, and his father later married a Japanese woman. Shin spent his youth with his father and step-mother living in Manchuria and Japan. After they returned to what had become South Korea, Shin's father died in 1952, and his stepmother died the following year. After her death, Shin moved to Seoul, where he worked in a pharmaceutical factory and attended night school. During this time, he taught himself to play guitar after a failed attempt at learning to play the violin.

== Career ==
=== Beginnings ===
In 1957, when he was 19 years old, Shin made his debut at a U.S. military base in South Korea, one of the few places where South Korean musicians could find regular work at the time. Shin had been inspired by the American rock, jazz and, later, psychedelic rock he heard on the American Forces Korea Network radio station. Using the stage name Jackie Shin, he gained immense popularity performing on bases, and was performing up to 40 shows per month at one point. Shin later said that the U.S. military bases were where Korean rock was born.

=== Solo album and first South Korean rock band ===
Shin released his first album, Hiki Shin Guitar Melody, in 1958. The album included original songs in a variety of styles, covers of traditional Korean music, and covers of the hit American instrumental songs "Honky Tonk" and "Green Onions." Today, the album is highly valued by record collectors, and a copy of the original vinyl record was worth an estimated 10 million KRW in 2016.

In 1964, Shin's rock band Add4 released its first album, The Woman in the Rain. Add4 is considered to be South Korea's first rock band.

=== Mainstream success and psychedelic soul ===
However, Shin did not achieve mainstream success in South Korea until 1968, when he produced the album My Dear for the singing duo The Pearl Sisters. The album, which included the hit songs "My Dear" and "A Cup of Coffee," was a huge success and went on to sell more than 1 million copies. For the next several years, Shin wrote songs and produced hit records for young musicians including Kim Chu-ja, with whom he made the album Before It's Too Late. Many of these recordings featured Shin's trademark psychedelic soul sound.

=== "Beautiful Rivers and Mountains" and arrest ===
In 1972, the office of South Korean president Park Chung Hee asked Shin to write a song in praise of the president. Shin refused and instead wrote a 10-minute long song about the beauty of South Korea, called "Beautiful Rivers and Mountains," which he recorded with his band at the time, Shin Joong Hyun & The Men. After the release of the song, police confiscated Shin's guitars and cut his long hair, which was banned at the time by the South Korean government. However, in 1974, his new band, Shin Joong Hyun & Yup Juns released their self-titled first album, which sold over 1 million copies and included the hit song, "Beautiful Woman."

In 1975, Shin was arrested for possession of marijuana after giving away a plant to a friend of the president's son, even though marijuana was not yet illegal at the time of his arrest. He was subsequently imprisoned and tortured. He was later imprisoned in a psychiatric hospital. After his release, Shin was banned from performing in South Korea, until after the assassination of Park Chung Hee in 1979. Regarding the assassination, Shin said, "God took Park and opted to save me." However, in the meantime, the public's taste in music had changed, according to Shin. "It was all, 'Let's work hard,' and 'Let's be happy' kind of stuff. It was completely physical, with no spirit, no mentality, no humanity," he later said. Because he could not perform, he turned to producing and song-writing, among other occupations.

=== Later career and retirement ===
During the 1980s, Shin ran a music club in Itaewon, a Seoul neighborhood popular with foreign visitors and U.S. military personnel. He opened Woodstock, another music club, in southeast Seoul in 1986 and ran it and taught there for the next two decades. In the 1990s, Shin's music experienced a renaissance of popularity in South Korea. Cho Kwon Woo, Shin Hyo Bom and Bom Yarom Kaul Kyou recorded new versions of his songs, as did his son, Shin Daechul.

Shin announced his retirement in 2006. His "farewell" concert aired over the course of 10 nights in December of that year on South Korean television station EBS. However, Shin returned to the stage in 2008 for his first concert in the United States at the Korean Music Festival at the Hollywood Bowl.

In 2010, he became the first Asian musician and the sixth in the world to be the recipient of a Fender Custom Shop Tribute Series guitar, joining Eric Clapton, Jeff Beck, Eddie Van Halen, Yngwie Malmsteen, and Stevie Ray Vaughan. Shin had used Fender guitars for much of his career. The following year, in 2011, Seattle-based Light in the Attic Records released the first U.S. pressings of Shin's music. He was honored by Berklee College of Music with an honorary Doctor of Music Award in 2017.

== Personal life ==
Shin was married to Myeong Jeong-gang, the first South Korean female drummer and a member of Blue Ribbons, until she died on March 23, 2018. They had three sons: Shin Daechul, guitarist for the heavy metal band Sinawe; Shin Yunchul, a singer and guitarist; and Shin Seokchul, a session drummer.

== Discography ==
# is recently reissued

The Add 4 Era

- (1959) Guitar Melody Compilation [Shin Jung-hyeon]
- (1964) The Woman in Rain-The Add 4 First Album [Add 4]
- (1966) The Ventures of Korea, Add 4 : Shin Jung-hyeon Insturumental Arrange Compilation Vol.1 [Add 4]
- (1967) The Woman in Rain [Blooz Tet]
- (1968) Enjoy the Guitar Instrumental Twist [Add 4]

The Superstar Era : producer, singer-songwriter and guitarist

- (1969) Green Apple [Shin Jung-hyeon]
- (1969) No/Spring Rain [Lee Jeong-hwa / Donkeys] #
- (1969) Before too late / Sgt.Kim from Vietnam [Kim Chu-ja] #
- (1969) Bell-bottom Trousers/Dear [Pearl Sisters] #
- (1970) Hello/You're a Fool [Questions]
- (1970) Hit Instrumental Compilation vol.1 [Shin Jung-hyeon]
- (1970) In-A-Kadda-Da-Vida [Shin Jung-hyeon / Questions] #
- (1971) Sound [Shin Jung-hyeon and his combo band]
- (1972) Setting Sun/Woman in the Mist/Beautiful Korea [Jang Hyeon / Shin Jung-hyeon and The Men] #
  - Partly reissued as CD GeoJitMalIYa, three 20 mins psyche jam pieces
- (1972) No/Don't Say to Go [Kim Jeong-mi] #
- (1972) Angel/I ... You [Seo Yu-seok] #
- (1972) Your Dream/Little Ship [Yang Hee-eun] #
  - Shin Jung-hyeon's compositions of Seo Yu-seok and Yang Hee-eun albums reissued as 1CD
- (1973) Wind [Kim Jeong-mi] #
- (1973) Now [Kim Jeong-mi] #

Shin Jung-hyeon Bands Era

- (1974) The Beauty/Think of You [Shin Junh-hyeon and YeopJeons] #
- (1975) Beautiful Korea/Mountain and River [Shin Jung-hyeon and YeopJeons] #
- (1975) Instrumental Best [Shin Jung-hyeon and YeopJeons] #
- (1980) Nobody Here But/Whenever See You [Shin Jung-hyeon and Music Power] #
- (1980) Please Wait/Even Your Leaving [Shin Jung-hyeon]
- (1982) The Satellite I Shot/As Waiting Somebody [Shin Jung-hyeon and Music Power] #
- (1983) Let's Go/Happy [Shin Jung-hyeon and SeNaGeuNe]

Solo

- (1988) During the Days/Winter Park [Shin Jung-hyeon]
- (1994/2CD) Do Nothing, Let it be [Shin Jung-hyeon]
- (1997/2CD) A Tribute to Shin Jung-hyeon [Various Artists]
- (1998/2CD) Kim SatGat [Shin Jung-hyeon]
- (2002/5CD Box) Not for Rock [Shin Jung-hyeon]
- (2002/2CD Box) Body and Feel [Shin Jung-hyeon]
- (2006) The Crane of a City [Shin Jung-hyeon]
- (2006) Comfortably Safe [Shin Jung-hyeon]
- (2007) Anthology [Shin Jung-hyeon]

== Awards and honors ==
In 2008, Shin won the Lifetime Achievement award at the Korean Music Awards.

At the 2011 Korean Popular Culture and Arts Awards, the South Korean government awarded Shin the Bogwan Order of Cultural Merit (3rd class) for "expanding the spectrum of Korean popular music."

In 2017, Shin received an honorary degree from the Berklee College of Music in Boston. The president of the college said that Shin "helped build the foundation upon which the global success of South Korean popular music rests."

== See also ==
- Korean rock
- Shin Jung Hyun & Yup Juns
