= 1998 in South Korean music =

The following is a list of notable events and releases that happened in 1998 in music in South Korea.

== Debuting and disbanded in 1998 ==
=== Debuting ===
- 1TYM
- Can
- Crying Nut
- Eve
- Fin.K.L
- Oathean
- Pia
- Sharp
- Shinhwa

=== Solo debuts ===
- Bobby Kim
- Cho PD
- Kim Dong-ryul
- J
- Johan Kim
- Kim Jin-pyo
- Kim Yeon-woo
- Jo Sung-mo
- Lena Park
- Seo Taiji
- Whang Bo-ryung
- Yang Hyun-suk

=== Disbandments ===
- U-BeS

== Releases in 1998 ==
=== January ===
Date	Title	Artist	Genre(s)
1	I Want to Know (알고 싶어요)	Yangpa	R&B, Ballad
1	Version 1.0	Can	Hard rock
2	Ten Years Later	Park Jin-young	K-pop

=== February ===
Date	Title	Artist	Genre(s)
1	Piece	Lena Park	Pop ballad

=== March ===
Date	Title	Artist	Genre(s)
1	Only Me Beside You... (그대 곁엔 나밖에...)	Kim Yeon-woo	Ballad, Dance
11	1999	Lee Seung-chul	Soft rock, Ballad

=== April ===
Date	Title	Artist	Genre(s)
1	Deep Blue	Lee Seung-chul	Soft rock, Ballad
1	Sorrow	Cool	K-pop
6	Yang Hyun-suk	Yang Hyun-suk	Hip hop
13	Become a Star (별이 되어)	Im Chang-jung	K-pop
22	Snappy Diva	Diva	K-pop
29	For Sale	Yoo Seung-jun	Hip hop

=== May ===
Date	Title	Artist	Genre(s)
19	Resolver	Shinhwa	K-pop
21	Shocking	Kim Hyun-jung	Dance, R&B
30	Blue Rain	Fin.K.L	K-pop

=== June ===
Date	Title	Artist	Genre(s)
1	Speed Up Losers	Crying Nut	Punk rock
16	You Will Be With Us	U-BeS	K-pop

=== July ===
Date	Title	Artist	Genre(s)
4	Kim Jo Han	Johan Kim	K-pop
7	Seo Tai Ji	Seo Taiji	Alternative rock, alternative metal, nu metal
30	Road Fighter	Sechs Kies	K-pop, Hip hop, Dance-pop

=== August ===
Date	Title	Artist	Genre(s)
7	Race	NRG	K-pop
31	Kim Kyung Ho III – 00:00:1998	Kim Kyung-ho	Hard rock

=== September ===
Date	Title	Artist	Genre(s)
4	To Heaven	Jo Sung-mo	Pop ballad
15	Baby V.O.X II	Baby V.O.X	K-pop
24	Resurrection	H.O.T.	K-pop

=== October ===
Date	Title	Artist	Genre(s)
17	Perfect Love	Turbo	K-pop
30	Special	Sechs Kies	K-pop
30	아시나요	Young Turks Club	Dance-pop

=== November ===
Date	Title	Artist	Genre(s)
1	Season's Greetings	NRG	K-pop
5	Blue Angel	Park Ji-yoon	K-pop
17	Sea & Eugene & Shoo	S.E.S.	K-pop
17	The S#arp	Sharp	K-pop
27	J-Gold	J	R&B, Soul
27	J-Blue	J	R&B, Soul
28	One Time for Your Mind	1TYM	Hip hop

=== December ===
Date	Title	Artist	Genre(s)
1	Beyond Face	Lee Eun-mi	Rock
7	Dream	Jang Hye-jin	R&B, Ballad
23	Kiss Me	Park Jin-young	K-pop
