= List of King of Mask Singer episodes (2019) =

South Korean variety-music show

- No. of episodes: Regular: 51

Release
- Original network: MBC
- Original release: January 6 – December 29, 2019

Season chronology
- ← Previous; 2018 Next → 2020

This is a list of episodes of the South Korean variety-music show King of Mask Singer in 2019. The show airs on MBC as part of their Sunday Night lineup. The names listed below are in performance order.

– Contestant is instantly eliminated by the live audience and judging panel
– After being eliminated, contestant performs a prepared song for the next round and takes off their mask during the instrumental break
– After being eliminated and revealing their identity, contestant has another special performance.
– Contestant advances to the next round.
– Contestant becomes the challenger.
– Mask King.

== Episodes ==
=== 93rd Generation Mask King ===
- Contestants: Yoon Ji-sung (Wanna One), Austin Kang, HerCheck (Super Kidd), Shin Seung-hee (Take), Lee Tae-kwon, Sujeong (Lovelyz), Lee Chae-yeon, Kim Won-hyo
Episodes 185 – 186

Episode 185

Episode 185 was broadcast on January 6, 2019. This marks the beginning of the Ninety-third Generation.

Order	Stage Name	Real Name	Song	Original artist	Vote
Round 1
Pair 1	Choose	Yoon Ji-sung of Wanna One	It Would Be Good (좋을텐데)	Sung Si-kyung	67
Pair 1	Jumong	Austin Kang	It Would Be Good (좋을텐데)	Sung Si-kyung	32
2nd Song	Jumong	Austin Kang	Yeosu Night Sea (여수 밤바다)	Busker Busker	—
Pair 2	The Lock of Love	HerCheck of Super Kidd	My Love Ugly (내사랑 못난이)	Yoon Jong-shin	47
Pair 2	Sky Lantern	Shin Seung-hee of Take	My Love Ugly (내사랑 못난이)	Yoon Jong-shin	52
2nd Song	The Lock of Love	HerCheck of Super Kidd	Find the Hidden Picture (숨은 그림 찾기)	Panic	—
Pair 3	A Good Brother	Lee Tae-kwon	What I Want to Do Once I Have a Lover (애인이 생기면 하고 싶은 일)	G.NA ft. Rain	61
Pair 3	Kongjwi and Patjwi	Sujeong of Lovelyz	What I Want to Do Once I Have a Lover (애인이 생기면 하고 싶은 일)	G.NA ft. Rain	38
2nd Song	Kongjwi and Patjwi	Sujeong of Lovelyz	Bad Boy	Red Velvet	—
Pair 4	Dongbaek Girl	Chae Yeon	Can I Get Married? (장가갈 수 있을까)	Coffee Boy	65
Pair 4	Edelweiss	Kim Won-hyo	Can I Get Married? (장가갈 수 있을까)	Coffee Boy	34
2nd Song	Edelweiss	Kim Won-hyo	Myself Reflected in My Heart (내 마음에 비친 내 모습)	Yoo Jae-ha	—

Episode 186

Episode 186 was broadcast on January 13, 2019.

As part of the show's launch in the United States, a judge on that version performed, in disguise to open this episode. The United States version debuted on 2 January 2019.

Order	Stage Name	Real Name	Song	Original artist	Vote
Special Opening	Golden Pig	Ken Jeong	Creep	Radiohead	—
Round 2
Pair 1	Choose	Yoon Ji-sung of Wanna One	Sofa	Crush	32
Pair 1	Sky Lantern	Shin Seung-hee of Take	Don't Say Goodbye (안녕이라고 말하지마)	Davichi	67
Pair 2	A Good Brother	Lee Tae-kwon	The Sea in My Worn Drawer (내 낡은 서랍속의 바다)	Panic	68
Pair 2	Dongbaek Girl	Chae Yeon	To You Again (너에게로 또 다시)	Byun Jin-sub	31
Round 3
Finalists	Sky Lantern	Shin Seung-hee of Take	Moment (The Heirs OST)	Lee Chang-min	12
Finalists	A Good Brother	Lee Tae-kwon	Cannot Have You (가질 수 없는 너)	Bank	87
Final
Battle	A Good Brother	Lee Tae-kwon	Previous three songs used as voting standard		46
Battle	Eagle	Lee Hyun	Memory Loss (기억상실)	Gummy	53

=== 94th Generation Mask King ===
- Contestants: Yoon Ddan-ddan, Gilgun, Choi Dae-chul, Jang Eun-ah, Nam Tae-hyun (South Club), Jukjae, Eric Thames, Ken (VIXX)
Episodes 187 – 188

Episode 187

Episode 187 was broadcast on January 20, 2019. This marks the beginning of the Ninety-fourth Generation.

Order	Stage Name	Real Name	Song	Original artist	Vote
Round 1
Pair 1	Country Mouse	Yoon Ddan-ddan	Say Hello (안부)	Byul & Na Yoon-kwon	56
Pair 1	Bremen Musical Band	Gilgun	Say Hello (안부)	Byul & Na Yoon-kwon	43
2nd Song	Bremen Musical Band	Gilgun	No One Can Stop Me (저 바다가 날 막겠어)	Sang A Im-Propp	—
Pair 2	Wing	Choi Dae-chul	It's Only Love (사랑일뿐야)	Kim Min-woo	38
Pair 2	Widow	Jang Eun-ah	It's Only Love (사랑일뿐야)	Kim Min-woo	61
2nd Song	Wing	Choi Dae-chul	Goodbye (잘가요)	Jung Jae-wook	—
Pair 3	Ice Cream	Nam Tae-hyun of South Club	Snow (눈)	Zion.T ft. Lee Moon-sae	67
Pair 3	Paint	Jukjae	Snow (눈)	Zion.T ft. Lee Moon-sae	32
2nd Song	Paint	Jukjae	Wi Ing Wi Ing (위잉위잉)	Hyukoh	—
Pair 4	Hip-hop Boy	Eric Thames	Isn't She Lovely	Stevie Wonder	28
Pair 4	Metal Boy	Ken of VIXX	Isn't She Lovely	Stevie Wonder	71
2nd Song	Hip-hop Boy	Eric Thames	Americano (아메리카노)	10cm	—

Episode 188

Episode 188 was broadcast on January 27, 2019.

Order	Stage Name	Real Name	Song	Original artist	Vote
Round 2
Pair 1	Country Mouse	Yoon Ddan-ddan	Have a Drink (술 한잔 해요)	Zia	31
Pair 1	Widow	Jang Eun-ah	You're the Best (넌 is 뭔들)	Mamamoo	68
Pair 2	Ice Cream	Nam Tae-hyun of South Club	Losing Heart (마음을 잃다)	Nell	21
Pair 2	Metal Boy	Ken of VIXX	There Has Never Been a Day I Haven't Loved You (하루도 그대를 사랑하지 않은 적이 없었다)	Im Chang-jung	78
Round 3
Finalists	Widow	Jang Eun-ah	People Who Make Me Sad (나를 슬프게 하는 사람들)	Kim Kyung-ho	67
Finalists	Metal Boy	Ken of VIXX	Beautiful Tomorrow	Park Hyo-shin	32
Final
Battle	Widow	Jang Eun-ah	Previous three songs used as voting standard		52
Battle	Eagle	Lee Hyun	Rose of Betrayal (배반의 장미)	Uhm Jung-hwa	47

=== 95th Generation Mask King (Seollal Idol Special) ===
- Contestants: Kim In-seong (SF9), Park Hyun-gyu (Vromance), Yeonjung (Cosmic Girls), Ji Su-yeon (Weki Meki), Rockhyun (100%), Haena (Matilda), Jinho (Pentagon), Hyojin (ONF)
Episodes 189 – 191

Episode 189

Episode 189 was broadcast on February 3, 2019. This marks the beginning of the Ninety-fifth Generation. This also starts the special episodes for Seollal, with the contestants are the main vocals of eight South Korean idol groups.

Order	Stage Name	Real Name	Song	Original artist	Vote
Special Opening	All eight contestants		We Are the Champions	Queen	—
Round 1
Duet Stage 1	John Lennon	Inseong of SF9	Runaway Baby	Bruno Mars	46
Duet Stage 1	Pavarotti	Park Hyun-gyu of Vromance	Runaway Baby	Bruno Mars	54
Solo Stage 1	Pavarotti	Park Hyun-gyu of Vromance	Clean Up (청소)	The Ray	54
Solo Stage 1	John Lennon	Inseong of SF9	I Love You	The Position	45
Result of Pair 1	Pavarotti (Park Hyun-gyu of Vromance) with 108 votes advanced to the next round. John Lennon (Inseong of SF9) with 91 votes was eliminated.				
Duet Stage 2	Princess Ji Jasmine	Yeonjung of Cosmic Girls	Listen	Beyoncé	54
Duet Stage 2	Bell	Ji Su-yeon of Weki Meki	Listen	Beyoncé	46
Solo Stage 2	Princess Ji Jasmine	Yeonjung of Cosmic Girls	Spark	BoA	42
Solo Stage 2	Bell	Ji Su-yeon of Weki Meki	The Red	Naomi	57
Result of Pair 2	Bell (Ji Su-yeon of Weki Meki) with 103 votes advanced to the next round. Princess Ji Jasmine (Yeonjung of Cosmic Girls) with 96 votes was eliminated.				
Duet Stage 3	Gogh	Rockhyun of 100%	Come What May	Ewan McGregor & Nicole Kidman	39
Duet Stage 3	Klimt	Haena of Matilda	Come What May	Ewan McGregor & Nicole Kidman	61
Solo Stage 3	Klimt	Haena of Matilda	Melted (얼음들)	AKMU	46
Solo Stage 3	Gogh	Rockhyun of 100%	Last Love (끝사랑)	Kim Bum-soo	53
Result of Pair 3	Klimt (Haena of Matilda) with 107 votes advanced to the next round. Gogh (Rockhyun of 100%) with 92 votes was eliminated.				

Episode 190

Episode 190 was broadcast on February 10, 2019.

Order	Stage Name	Real Name	Song	Original artist	Vote
Round 1
Duet Stage 4	Young Master	Jinho of Pentagon	Don't Stop Me Now	Queen	66
Duet Stage 4	City Magpie	Hyojin of ONF	Don't Stop Me Now	Queen	34
Solo Stage 4	Young Master	Jinho of Pentagon	Peppermint Candy (박하사탕)	YB	51
Solo Stage 4	City Magpie	Hyojin of ONF	365 Days (365일)	Ali	48
Result of Pair 4	Young Master (Jinho of Pentagon) with 117 votes advanced to the next round. City Magpie (Hyojin of ONF) with 82 votes was eliminated.				
Round 2
Pair 1	Pavarotti	Park Hyun-gyu of Vromance	Like It (좋니)	Yoon Jong-shin	60
Pair 1	Bell	Ji Su-yeon of Weki Meki	Intuition (직감)	CNBLUE	39
Pair 2	Klimt	Haena of Matilda	Defying Gravity (Korean version) (중력을 벗어나)	Musical Wicked OST	52
Pair 2	Young Master	Jinho of Pentagon	Tomboy	Hyukoh	47

Episode 191

Episode 191 was broadcast on February 17, 2019. The first half of this episode is the last part of Seollal Idol Special.

Order	Stage Name	Real Name	Song	Original artist	Vote
Round 3
Finalists	Pavarotti	Park Hyun-gyu of Vromance	Swing Baby	J. Y. Park	31
Finalists	Klimt	Haena of Matilda	Wild Flower (야생화)	Park Hyo-shin	68
Final
Battle	Klimt	Haena of Matilda	Previous four songs used as voting standard		51
Battle	Widow	Jang Eun-ah	I Hate You (미워요)	Choi Jung-in	48

=== 96th Generation Mask King ===
- Contestants: Yoon Soo-hyun, Risabae, Kwon Jin-ah, Seo Tae-hoon, Oh Young-shil, Jung Jae-wook, Kim Yong-jin (Bohemian), Hee-jin (Loona)
Episodes 191 – 193

Episode 191

Episode 191 was broadcast on February 17, 2019. The second half of this episode marks the beginning of the Ninety-sixth Generation.

Order	Stage Name	Real Name	Song	Original artist	Vote
Round 1
Pair 1	Princess	Yoon Soo-hyun	Cast a Spell (주문을 걸어)	Park Hye-kyung	60
Pair 1	Long Princess	Risabae	Cast a Spell (주문을 걸어)	Park Hye-kyung	39
2nd Song	Long Princess	Risabae	Grace	Lee Soo-young	—
Pair 2	Aquarius	Kwon Jin-ah	City of Stars	Ryan Gosling and Emma Stone	67
Pair 2	Pisces	Seo Tae-hoon	City of Stars	Ryan Gosling and Emma Stone	32
2nd Song	Pisces	Seo Tae-hoon	You Don't Know Man (남자를 몰라)	Buzz	—

Episode 192

Episode 192 was broadcast on February 24, 2019.

Order	Stage Name	Real Name	Song	Original artist	Vote
Round 1
Pair 3	Gwanghwamun Square	Oh Young-shil	Met Her 100m Away (그녀를 만나는 곳 100m 전)	Lee Sang-woo	28
Pair 3	Wall Street	Jung Jae-wook	Met Her 100m Away (그녀를 만나는 곳 100m 전)	Lee Sang-woo	71
2nd Song	Gwanghwamun Square	Oh Young-shil	When the Cold Wind Blows (찬바람이 불면)	Kim Ji-yeon	—
Pair 4	Play Guy	Kim Yong-jin of Bohemian	Officially Missing You (Korean version)	Tamia	52
Pair 4	Enter Lady	HeeJin of Loona	Officially Missing You (Korean version)	Tamia	47
2nd Song	Enter Lady	HeeJin of Loona	Full Moon (보름달)	Sunmi ft. Lena	—
Round 2
Pair 1	Princess	Yoon Soo-hyun	Hahaha Song (하하하쏭)	Jaurim	28
Pair 1	Aquarius	Kwon Jin-ah	Ddu-Du Ddu-Du (뚜두뚜두)	Blackpink	71
Pair 2	Wall Street	Jung Jae-wook	My Own Grief (나만의 슬픔)	Kim Don-kyoo	41
Pair 2	Play Guy	Kim Yong-jin of Bohemian	We're Breaking Up (헤어지는 중입니다)	Lee Eun-mi	58

Episode 193

Episode 193 was broadcast on March 3, 2019.

Order	Stage Name	Real Name	Song	Original artist	Vote
Round 3
Finalists	Aquarius	Kwon Jin-ah	To J (J에게)	Lee Sun-hee	37
Finalists	Play Guy	Kim Yong-jin of Bohemian	Station (정류장)	Panic	62
Final
Battle	Play Guy	Kim Yong-jin of Bohemian	Previous three songs used as voting standard		34
Battle	Klimt	Haena of Matilda	Heart Disease (심장병)	Lee Seung-hwan	65

=== 97th Generation Mask King ===
- Contestants: Lee Jeong-yong, Seol Ha-yoon, Jinsil (Mad Soul Child), Ha Seung-ri, Hong Jin-ho, Kim Hyung-jun (SS501/Double S 301), Ryeowook (Super Junior), Kenta Takada (Kenta Sanggyun)
Episodes 193 – 194

Episode 193

Episode 193 was broadcast on March 3, 2019. The second half of this episode marks the beginning of the Ninety-seventh Generation.

Order	Stage Name	Real Name	Song	Original artist	Vote
Round 1
Pair 1	Yanghwa Bridge	Lee Jeong-yong	Lying on the Sea (바다에 누워)	The Treble Clef	27
Pair 1	Banpo Bridge	Seol Ha-yoon	Lying on the Sea (바다에 누워)	The Treble Clef	72
2nd Song	Yanghwa Bridge	Lee Jeong-yong	Sparks (불티)	Jeon Young-rok	—
Pair 2	Classes to Begin	Jinsil of Mad Soul Child	Happy Me (행복한 나를)	Eco	67
Pair 2	Starting School	Ha Seung-ri	Happy Me (행복한 나를)	Eco	32
2nd Song	Starting School	Ha Seung-ri	Piled Up with Longing (그리움만 쌓이네)	Yeojin	—
Pair 3	TMI	Hong Jin-ho	After We Broke (사랑한 후에)	Shin Sung-woo	19
Pair 3	Ieung Jieut	Kim Hyung-jun of SS501/Double S 301	After We Broke (사랑한 후에)	Shin Sung-woo	80
2nd Song	TMI	Hong Jin-ho	Fly, Chick (날아라 병아리)	N.EX.T	—

Episode 194

Episode 194 was broadcast on March 10, 2019.

Order	Stage Name	Real Name	Song	Original artist	Vote
Round 1
Pair 4	Chang Young Sil	Ryeowook of Super Junior	Hug	TVXQ	58
Pair 4	Newton	Kenta of Kenta Sanggyun	Hug	TVXQ	41
2nd Song	Newton	Kenta of Kenta Sanggyun	As I Told You (말하자면)	Kim Sung-jae	—
Round 2
Pair 1	Banpo Bridge	Seol Ha-yoon	It's Over	Lee Hi	42
Pair 1	Classes to Begin	Jinsil of Mad Soul Child	Last Dance	Big Bang	57
Pair 2	Ieung Jieut	Kim Hyung-jun of SS501/Double S 301	Gift (선물)	UN	28
Pair 2	Chang Young Sil	Ryeowook of Super Junior	We Should've Been Friends (친구라도 될 걸 그랬어)	Gummy	71
Round 3
Finalists	Classes to Begin	Jinsil of Mad Soul Child	Yanghwa Bridge (양화대교)	Zion.T	30
Finalists	Chang Young Sil	Ryeowook of Super Junior	Next Winter (새겨울)	Jung Joon-il	69
Final
Battle	Chang Young Sil	Ryeowook of Super Junior	Previous three songs used as voting standard		37
Battle	Klimt	Haena of Matilda	Punishment (벌)	Park Mi-kyung	62

=== 98th Generation Mask King ===
- Contestants: Y (Golden Child), Kim Ju-na, Jeong So-yeon (Laboum), Jang Gyu-ri (Fromis 9), Jo Bin (Norazo), Choo Dae-yeop, Lee Won-suk (Daybreak), Choi Song-hyun
Episodes 195 – 196

Episode 195

Episode 195 was broadcast on March 17, 2019. This marks the beginning of the Ninety-eighth Generation.

Order	Stage Name	Real Name	Song	Original artist	Vote
Round 1
Pair 1	Walnut Confection	Y of Golden Child	Can I Love Again (다시 사랑할 수 있을까)	4Men & Park Jeong-eun (South Korean singer)	35
Pair 1	Small Rice Cake Rice Cake	Kim Ju-na	Can I Love Again (다시 사랑할 수 있을까)	4Men & Park Jeong-eun (South Korean singer)	64
2nd Song	Walnut Confection	Y of Golden Child	I Believe (믿어요)	TVXQ	—
Pair 2	Spring Rain	Soyeon of Laboum	Friday (금요일에 만나요)	IU	60
Pair 2	Spring Flowers	Jang Gyu-ri of Fromis 9	Friday (금요일에 만나요)	IU	39
2nd Song	Spring Flowers	Jang Gyu-ri of Fromis 9	We Used to Love (사랑했잖아)	Lyn	—
Pair 3	Kim Gura	Jo Bin of Norazo	The Cult of Solo (Solo예찬)	Lee Moon-sae	47
Pair 3	Kim Seongju	Choo Dae-yeop	The Cult of Solo (Solo예찬)	Lee Moon-sae	52
2nd Song	Kim Gura	Jo Bin of Norazo	Why is the Sky (왜 하늘은)	Lee Ji-hoon	—
Pair 4	Gulliver	Lee Won-seok of Daybreak	Heart for Only One (한사람을 위한 마음)	Lee Oh Sympathy	81
Pair 4	Giselle	Choi Song-hyun	Heart for Only One (한사람을 위한 마음)	Lee Oh Sympathy	18
2nd Song	Giselle	Choi Song-hyun	Curry (카레)	Norazo	—

Episode 196

Episode 196 was broadcast on March 24, 2019.

Order	Stage Name	Real Name	Song	Original artist	Vote
Round 2
Pair 1	Small Rice Cake Rice Cake	Kim Ju-na	Singing Got Better (노래가 늘었어)	Ailee	68
Pair 1	Spring Rain	Soyeon of Laboum	Hello / Goodbye (안녕) (My Love from the Star OST)	Hyolyn	31
Pair 2	Kim Seongju	Choo Dae-yeop	Melancholy Letter (우울한 편지)	Yoo Jae-ha	13
Pair 2	Gulliver	Lee Won-seok of Daybreak	Only Then (그때 헤어지면 돼)	Roy Kim	86
Round 3
Finalists	Small Rice Cake Rice Cake	Kim Ju-na	Emergency Room (응급실)	izi	20
Finalists	Gulliver	Lee Won-seok of Daybreak	Destiny (나의 지구)	Lovelyz	79
Final
Battle	Gulliver	Lee Won-seok of Daybreak	Previous three songs used as voting standard		52
Battle	Klimt	Haena of Matilda	Track 9	Lee So-ra	47

=== 99th Generation Mask King ===
- Contestants: Giant Pink, Kim Kyung-hyun, Alex Chu (Clazziquai), Han (Stray Kids), Lee Min-kyung (Diva), Lee Seung-yoon, Kim Se-jeong (I.O.I/Gugudan), Song Geon-hee
Episodes 197 – 198

Episode 197

Episode 197 was broadcast on March 31, 2019. This marks the beginning of the Ninety-ninth Generation.

Order	Stage Name	Real Name	Song	Original artist	Vote
Round 1
Pair 1	Sun and Wind	Giant Pink	Proposal (청혼)	Noel	48
Pair 1	The Three Little Pigs	Kim Kyung-hyun	Proposal (청혼)	Noel	51
2nd Song	Sun and Wind	Giant Pink	Scarecrow (허수아비)	Kim Gun-mo	—
Pair 2	Chuno	Alex of Clazziquai	Me After You (너를 만나)	Paul Kim	67
Pair 2	Imgeokjjeong	Han of Stray Kids	Me After You (너를 만나)	Paul Kim	32
2nd Song	Imgeokjjeong	Han of Stray Kids	D (Half Moon)	Dean ft. Gaeko	—
Pair 3	Bichon Frise	Lee Min-kyung of Diva	Jazz Cafe (재즈 카페)	Shin Hae-chul	69
Pair 3	Welsh Corgi	Lee Seung-yoon	Jazz Cafe (재즈 카페)	Shin Hae-chul	30
2nd Song	Welsh Corgi	Lee Seung-yoon	Blue Jean Lady (청바지 아가씨)	Love and Peace	—
Pair 4	Iriga	Kim Se-jeong of I.O.I/Gugudan	I Need You	Huh Gak & Zia	68
Pair 4	Gagamel	Song Geon-hee	I Need You	Huh Gak & Zia	31
2nd Song	Gagamel	Song Geon-hee	The Great Dipper (북두칠성)	Roy Kim	—

Episode 198

Episode 198 was broadcast on April 7, 2019.

Order	Stage Name	Real Name	Song	Original artist	Vote
Round 2
Pair 1	The Three Little Pigs	Kim Kyung-hyun	Castle of Glass (유리의 성)	K2	44
Pair 1	Chuno	Alex of Clazziquai	Waiting (...ing OST) (기다림)	Lee Seung-yeol	55
Pair 2	Bichon Frise	Lee Min-kyung of Diva	Crazy (미친거니)	Vibe	38
Pair 2	Iriga	Kim Se-jeong of I.O.I/Gugudan	To You Who Don't Love Me (나를 사랑하지 않는 그대에게)	Lee So-ra	61
Round 3
Finalists	Chuno	Alex of Clazziquai	Said (라구요)	Kang San-ae	29
Finalists	Iriga	Kim Se-jeong of I.O.I/Gugudan	Twenty-five, Twenty-one (스물다섯, 스물하나)	Jaurim	70
Final
Battle	Iriga	Kim Se-jeong of I.O.I/Gugudan	Previous three songs used as voting standard		22
Battle	Gulliver	Lee Won-seok of Daybreak	Home	Park Hyo-shin	77

=== 100th Generation Mask King ===
- Contestants: Lee Seung-hyub (N.Flying), Lee Sang-mi, Yoo Seung-woo, Ham So-won, Ha Jin, Woo Won-jae, Bong Jung-geun, Hong Kyung-min
Episodes 199 – 200

Episode 199

Episode 199 was broadcast on April 14, 2019. This marks the beginning of the Hundredth Generation.

Order	Stage Name	Real Name	Song	Original artist	Vote
Opening	Yoo Young-seok, Yoon Sang, Kim Hyun-cheol, Kim Gu-ra, Kim Sung-joo, Kai, Kim Ho-young		Child I'm Looking for (내가 찾는 아이)	Deulgukhwa	—
Round 1
Pair 1	Red Bean Bread	Lee Seung-hyub of N.Flying	Clown (광대)	Leessang ft. BMK	38
Pair 1	Blue Mouse	Lee Sang-mi	Clown (광대)	Leessang ft. BMK	61
2nd Song	Red Bean Bread	Lee Seung-hyub of N.Flying	Ties (매듭)	Lee Juck	—
Pair 2	The Emperor's New Clothes	Yoo Seung-woo	Dam-da-di (담다디)	Lee Tzsche	74
Pair 2	Minimum Wages	Ham So-won	Dam-da-di (담다디)	Lee Tzsche	25
2nd Song	Minimum Wages	Ham So-won	Firefly (개똥벌레)	Shin Hyung-won	—
Pair 3	Power Walking	Ha Jin	Don't Worry (걱정말아요 그대)	Jeon In-kwon	67
Pair 3	Starking	Woo Won-jae	Don't Worry (걱정말아요 그대)	Jeon In-kwon	32
2nd Song	Starking	Woo Won-jae	Old Love (옛사랑)	Lee Moon-sae	—
Pair 4	Left King	Bong Jung-geun	Love Two (사랑 Two)	Yoon Do-hyun	21
Pair 4	Right King	Hong Kyung-min	Love Two (사랑 Two)	Yoon Do-hyun	78
2nd Song	Left King	Bong Jung-geun	Rose (장미)	April & May (4월과 5월)	—

Episode 200

Episode 200 was broadcast on April 21, 2019.

Order	Stage Name	Real Name	Song	Original artist	Vote
Round 2
Pair 1	Blue Mouse	Lee Sang-mi	Hey Guyz	Jaurim	46
Pair 1	The Emperor's New Clothes	Yoo Seung-woo	Think of You (네 생각)	John Park	53
Pair 2	Power Walking	Ha Jin	Between the Lips (50cm) (입술 사이 (50 cm))	IU	48
Pair 2	Right King	Hong Kyung-min	Fly (날아)	Lee Seung-yeol	51
Round 3
Finalists	The Emperor's New Clothes	Yoo Seung-woo	On the Street (거리에서)	Kim Kwang-seok	39
Finalists	Right King	Hong Kyung-min	Crying	Flower	60
Final
Battle	Right King	Hong Kyung-min	Previous three songs used as voting standard		31
Battle	Gulliver	Lee Won-seok of Daybreak	Laundry (빨래)	Lee Juck	68

=== 101st Generation Mask King ===
- Contestants: Park Si-eun, Kassy, Woo Seung-min, Yoon Hyung-ryul, Jun Hyo-seong, Hwang Dong-joo, Bobby Kim, U-Kwon (Block B)
Episodes 201 – 202

Episode 201

Episode 201 was broadcast on April 28, 2019. This marks the beginning of the Hundred-first Generation.

Order	Stage Name	Real Name	Song	Original artist	Vote
Round 1
Pair 1	Chaos	Park Si-eun	Road (길)	g.o.d	47
Pair 1	Destiny	Kassy	Road (길)	g.o.d	52
2nd Song	Chaos	Park Si-eun	Fate (인연)	Lee Sun-hee	—
Pair 2	Fontana di Trevi	Woo Seung-min	You're to Me And I'm to You (The Classic OST) (너에게 난 나에게 넌)	Jatanpung	36
Pair 2	Venice	Yoon Hyung-ryul	You're to Me And I'm to You (The Classic OST) (너에게 난 나에게 넌)	Jatanpung	63
2nd Song	Fontana di Trevi	Woo Seung-min	Mr. Wang (왕서방)	Jin Mi-ryung	—
Pair 3	A Chocolate Factory	Jun Hyo-seong	Sorrow (애수)	Lee Moon-sae	60
Pair 3	Neverland	Hwang Dong-joo	Sorrow (애수)	Lee Moon-sae	39
2nd Song	Neverland	Hwang Dong-joo	Bury the Pain (묻어버린 아픔)	Kim Dong-hwan	—
Pair 4	Che Guevara	Bobby Kim	Oh! What a Shiny Night (밤이 깊었네)	Crying Nut	70
Pair 4	Edison	U-Kwon of Block B	Oh! What a Shiny Night (밤이 깊었네)	Crying Nut	29
2nd Song	Edison	U-Kwon of Block B	Every Moment of You (너의 모든 순간)	Sung Si-kyung	—

Episode 202

Episode 202 was broadcast on May 5, 2019.

Order	Stage Name	Real Name	Song	Original artist	Vote
Round 2
Pair 1	Destiny	Kassy	I'm Happy (난 행복해)	Lee So-ra	38
Pair 1	Venice	Yoon Hyung-ryul	Making a New Ending for This Story (이 소설의 끝을 다시 써 보려 해)	Han Dong-geun	61
Pair 2	A Chocolate Factory	Jun Hyo-seong	Some (썸 탈꺼야)	Bolbbalgan4	26
Pair 2	Che Guevara	Bobby Kim	Don't Forget (잊어버리지마)	Crush ft. Taeyeon	73
Round 3
Finalists	Venice	Yoon Hyung-ryul	Love Leaves It's Scent (사랑은... 향기를 남기고)	Tei	47
Finalists	Che Guevara	Bobby Kim	Horsetail (말꼬리)	Yoon Jong-shin & Jung Joon-il	52
Final
Battle	Che Guevara	Bobby Kim	Previous three songs used as voting standard		28
Battle	Gulliver	Lee Won-seok of Daybreak	Red Camel (붉은 낙타)	Lee Seung-hwan	71

=== 102nd Generation Mask King ===
- Contestants: Choi Hyo-in, Jung Kwang-ho (Voisper), Yoo Young-jae, Lee Ah-in (Momoland), Kang Shin-il, Jung Hyung-seok, Yang Mi-ra, Car, the Garden
Episodes 203 – 204

Episode 203

Episode 203 was broadcast on May 12, 2019. This marks the beginning of the Hundred-second Generation.

Order	Stage Name	Real Name	Song	Original artist	Vote
Round 1
Pair 1	Lotus Lantern	Choi Hyo-in	Before Sunrise (비포 선라이즈)	Lee Juck ft. Jung-in	70
Pair 1	Etc	Kwangho of Voisper	Before Sunrise (비포 선라이즈)	Lee Juck ft. Jung-in	29
2nd Song	Etc	Kwangho of Voisper	Polaris (북극성)	Kangta	—
Pair 2	A Chain Letter	Yoo Young-jae	Last Goodbye (오랜 날 오랜 밤)	AKMU	52
Pair 2	Fortune Cookie	Ahin of Momoland	Last Goodbye (오랜 날 오랜 밤)	AKMU	47
2nd Song	Fortune Cookie	Ahin of Momoland	Four Seasons (사계)	Taeyeon	—
Pair 3	Reliever	Kang Shin-il	Time to (가는 세월)	Seo Yoo-seok	53
Pair 3	Clean-up Man	Jung Hyung-seok	Time to (가는 세월)	Seo Yoo-seok	46
2nd Song	Clean-up Man	Jung Hyung-seok	Childlike (철부지)	John Park	—
Pair 4	Mona Lisa	Yang Mi-ra	Super Star (슈퍼스타)	Lee Han-cheol	27
Pair 4	The Fife Player	Car, the Garden	Super Star (슈퍼스타)	Lee Han-cheol	72
2nd Song	Mona Lisa	Yang Mi-ra	Even If I Love You (너를 사랑하고도)	Jeon Yoo-na	—

Episode 204

Episode 204 was broadcast on May 19, 2019.

Order	Stage Name	Real Name	Song	Original artist	Vote
Round 2
Pair 1	Lotus Lantern	Choi Hyo-in	Twit (멍청이)	Hwasa	84
Pair 1	A Chain Letter	Yoo Young-jae	Although I Loved You (사랑했지만)	Kim Kwang-seok	15
Pair 2	Reliever	Kang Shin-il	Super Dominant (초우)	Patti Kim	28
Pair 2	The Fife Player	Car, the Garden	Rebirth (환생)	Yoon Jong-shin	71
Round 3
Finalists	Lotus Lantern	Choi Hyo-in	Emptiness in Memory (기억의 빈자리)	Naul	43
Finalists	The Fife Player	Car, the Garden	We All Lie (Sky Castle OST)	Ha Jin (singer)	56
Final
Battle	The Fife Player	Car, the Garden	Previous three songs used as voting standard		35
Battle	Gulliver	Lee Won-seok of Daybreak	The Road (길)	Paul Kim	64

=== 103rd Generation Mask King ===
- Contestants: Coffee Boy, Chaekyung (April), Jung Ha-na, Parc Jae-jung, Yoon Joo-bin, Young K (Day6), Lee Bo-ram (SeeYa), Jang Dong-min
Episodes 205 – 206

Episode 205

Episode 205 was broadcast on May 26, 2019. This marks the beginning of the Hundred-third Generation.

Order	Stage Name	Real Name	Song	Original artist	Vote
Round 1
Pair 1	Traffic Jam	Coffee Boy	Nice to Meet You (처음 뵙겠습니다)	G.NA & Wheesung	58
Pair 1	Mask Identity	Chaekyung of April	Nice to Meet You (처음 뵙겠습니다)	G.NA & Wheesung	41
2nd Song	Mask Identity	Chaekyung of April	I Do	Rain	—
Pair 2	MBC	Jung Ha-na	Farewell Under the Sun (대낮에 한 이별)	Park Jin-young & Sunye	31
Pair 2	Dumulmeori	Parc Jae-jung	Farewell Under the Sun (대낮에 한 이별)	Park Jin-young & Sunye	68
2nd Song	MBC	Jung Ha-na	Life Is Good (인생은 즐거워)	Jessica H.O	—
Pair 3	Grampus	Yoon Joo-bin	UFO	Panic	26
Pair 3	Narwhal	Young K of Day6	UFO	Panic	73
2nd Song	Grampus	Yoon Joo-bin	Departure (출발)	Kim Dong-ryul	—
Pair 4	Nightingale	Lee Bo-ram of SeeYa	That Man (그 남자)	Hyun Bin	96
Pair 4	Schweitzer	Jang Dong-min	That Man (그 남자)	Hyun Bin	3
2nd Song	Schweitzer	Jang Dong-min	Around Thirty (서른 즈음에)	Kim Kwang-seok	—

Episode 206

Episode 206 was broadcast on June 2, 2019.

Order	Stage Name	Real Name	Song	Original artist	Vote
Round 2
Pair 1	Traffic Jam	Coffee Boy	Jump	Kim Dong-ryul	47
Pair 1	Dumulmeori	Parc Jae-jung	Travel to Me (나에게로 떠나는 여행)	BUZZ	52
Pair 2	Narwhal	Young K of Day6	If I Hold You in My Arms (너를 품에 안으면)	Cult	25
Pair 2	Nightingale	Lee Bo-ram of SeeYa	Goodbye for a Moment (잠시만 안녕)	MC the Max	74
Round 3
Finalists	Dumulmeori	Parc Jae-jung	The Fool (이 바보야)	Jung Seung-hwan	21
Finalists	Nightingale	Lee Bo-ram of SeeYa	A Smart Choice (현명한 선택)	So Chan-whee	78
Final
Battle	Nightingale	Lee Bo-ram of SeeYa	Previous three songs used as voting standard		52
Battle	Gulliver	Lee Won-seok of Daybreak	Whale Hunting (고래사냥)	Song Chang-sik	47

=== 104th Generation Mask King ===
- Contestants: Song Ga-in, Ahn Il-kwon, Nam Kyung-eup, Kim Sung-soo (Cool), Won Heum (Norazo), Seunghee (Oh My Girl), JK Kim Dong-wook, Takuya Terada
Episodes 207 – 208

Episode 207

Episode 207 was broadcast on June 9, 2019. This marks the beginning of the Hundred-fourth Generation.

Order	Stage Name	Real Name	Song	Original artist	Vote
Round 1
Pair 1	Chandelier	Song Ga-in	Truth (진실)	Cool	76
Pair 1	Golden Key	Ahn Il-kwon	Truth (진실)	Cool	23
2nd Song	Golden Key	Ahn Il-kwon	Between Hidden Time (가려진 시간 사이로)	Yoon Sang	—
Pair 2	Paprika	Nam Kyung-eup	To Be Alone (홀로 된다는 것)	Byun Jin-sub	63
Pair 2	Pea	Kim Sung-soo of Cool	To Be Alone (홀로 된다는 것)	Byun Jin-sub	36
2nd Song	Pea	Kim Sung-soo of Cool	Bongsook (봉숙이)	Rose Motel	—
Pair 3	Aquarium	Won Heum of Norazo	Movie Dating (조조할인)	Lee Moon-sae	46
Pair 3	Zoo	Seunghee of Oh My Girl	Movie Dating (조조할인)	Lee Moon-sae	53
2nd Song	Aquarium	Won Heum of Norazo	Because You're My Woman (내 여자라니까)	Lee Seung-gi	—
Pair 4	Boiled Chicken	JK Kim Dong-wook	Friends (친구)	Ahn Jae-wook	73
Pair 4	Chicken	Takuya Terada	Friends (친구)	Ahn Jae-wook	26
2nd Song	Chicken	Takuya Terada	Mom (엄마)	Ra.D	—

Episode 208

Episode 208 was broadcast on June 16, 2019.

Order	Stage Name	Real Name	Song	Original artist	Vote
Round 2
Pair 1	Chandelier	Song Ga-in	Childish Adult (어른아이)	Gummy	68
Pair 1	Paprika	Nam Kyung-eup	Once Again This Night (이 밤을 다시 한 번)	Jo Ha-moon	31
Pair 2	Zoo	Seunghee of Oh My Girl	Wonder If You Loved Me (사랑하긴 했었나요)	Lisa	39
Pair 2	Boiled Chicken	JK Kim Dong-wook	Let Me Say Goodbye	Bobby Kim	60
Round 3
Finalists	Chandelier	Song Ga-in	I Have a Lover (애인 있어요)	Lee Eun-mi	24
Finalists	Boiled Chicken	JK Kim Dong-wook	After the Love Has Gone (사랑한 후에)	Jeon In-kwon	75
Final
Battle	Boiled Chicken	JK Kim Dong-wook	Previous three songs used as voting standard		41
Battle	Nightingale	Lee Bo-ram of SeeYa	Throw Away (연)	Big Mama	58

=== 105th Generation Mask King ===
- Contestants: Sunday (The Grace), Siyeon (Dreamcatcher), Doyoung (NCT), Jasson, Hangzoo (Rhythm Power), Lee Ji-hyung, Kim Jang-hoon, No Min-woo
Episodes 209 – 210

Episode 209

Episode 209 was broadcast on June 23, 2019. This marks the beginning of the Hundred-fifth Generation.

Order	Stage Name	Real Name	Song	Original artist	Vote
Round 1
Pair 1	Cupcake	Sunday of The Grace	Greatest Love of All	Whitney Houston	51
Pair 1	Doughnut	Siyeon of Dreamcatcher	Greatest Love of All	Whitney Houston	48
2nd Song	Doughnut	Siyeon of Dreamcatcher	Sweet (달아요)	Lena Park	—
Pair 2	Asst Manager	Doyoung of NCT	A Little Girl (소녀)	Lee Moon-sae	72
Pair 2	Section Chief	Jasson	A Little Girl (소녀)	Lee Moon-sae	27
2nd Song	Section Chief	Jasson	Will You Marry Me? (결혼해줄래)	Lee Seung-gi	—
Pair 3	Paper Airplane	Hangzoo of Rhythm Power	Ah-Choo	Lovelyz	64
Pair 3	Paper Crane	Lee Ji-hyung	Ah-Choo	Lovelyz	35
2nd Song	Paper Crane	Lee Ji-hyung	Dunk Shot (덩크 슛)	Lee Seung-hwan	—
Pair 4	Vampire	Kim Jang-hoon	You're in My Embrace (그대 내 품에)	Yoo Jae-ha	52
Pair 4	Arabian Prince	No Min-woo	You're in My Embrace (그대 내 품에)	Yoo Jae-ha	47
2nd Song	Arabian Prince	No Min-woo	Fake Love	BTS	—

Episode 210

Episode 210 was postponed one week because of the 2019 Koreas–United States DMZ Summit news coverage, and broadcast on July 7, 2019.

Order	Stage Name	Real Name	Song	Original artist	Vote
Round 2
Pair 1	Cupcake	Sunday of The Grace	A Certain Longing (어떤 그리움)	Lee Eun-mi	22
Pair 1	Asst Manager	Doyoung of NCT	Beautiful	Crush	77
Pair 2	Paper Airplane	Hangzoo of Rhythm Power	180 Degree (180도)	Ben	58
Pair 2	Vampire	Kim Jang-hoon	I Don't Know Yet (지금은 알 수 없어)	Kim Jong-seo	41
Round 3
Finalists	Asst Manager	Doyoung of NCT	Time Walking on Memory (기억을 걷는 시간)	Nell	74
Finalists	Paper Airplane	Hangzoo of Rhythm Power	Comeback Again (다시 와주라)	Vibe	25
Final
Battle	Asst Manager	Doyoung of NCT	Previous three songs used as voting standard		37
Battle	Nightingale	Lee Bo-ram of SeeYa	Lie	Hwayobi	62

=== 106th Generation Mask King ===
- Contestants: Oh Jin-sung (izi), Hong Yoon-hwa, Sangil (Snuper), Rothy, Kyuhyun (Super Junior), Heo Il-hoo, Kim Bo-yeon, Bae Seul-ki
Episodes 211 – 212

Episode 211

Episode 211 was broadcast on July 14, 2019. This marks the beginning of the Hundred-sixth Generation.

Order	Stage Name	Real Name	Song	Original artist	Vote
Round 1
Pair 1	Mayonnaise	Oh Jin-sung of IZI	Night After Night (밤이면 밤마다)	Insooni	39
Pair 1	Ketchup	Hong Yoon-hwa	Night After Night (밤이면 밤마다)	Insooni	60
2nd Song	Mayonnaise	Oh Jin-sung of IZI	Miracles in December (12월의 기적)	Exo	—
Pair 2	Voice Boyfriend	Sangil of Snuper	1, 2, 3, 4	Lee Hi	25
Pair 2	Sweet Voice	Rothy	1, 2, 3, 4	Lee Hi	74
2nd Song	Voice Boyfriend	Sangil of Snuper	Ways to Avoid the Sun (태양을 피하는 방법)	Rain	—
Pair 3	Jinie	Kyuhyun of Super Junior	Should I Say I Love You Again? (다시 사랑한다 말할까)	Kim Dong-ryul	78
Pair 3	Aladdin	Heo Il-hoo	Should I Say I Love You Again? (다시 사랑한다 말할까)	Kim Dong-ryul	21
2nd Song	Aladdin	Heo Il-hoo	As Love Scattered on the World (세상에 뿌려진 사랑만큼)	Lee Seung-hwan	—
Pair 4	Cold Buckwheat Noodles	Kim Bo-yeon	Love is Like a Raindrop of Outside the Windows (사랑은 창밖에 빗물 같아요)	Yang Soo-kyung	38
Pair 4	Noodles in Cold Soybean Soup	Bae Seul-ki	Love is Like a Raindrop of Outside the Windows (사랑은 창밖에 빗물 같아요)	Yang Soo-kyung	61
2nd Song	Cold Buckwheat Noodles	Kim Bo-yeon	Really Really Like You (진짜 진짜 좋아해)	Haeeunlee	—

Episode 212

Episode 212 was broadcast on July 21, 2019.

Order	Stage Name	Real Name	Song	Original artist	Vote
Round 2
Pair 1	Ketchup	Hong Yoon-hwa	My Love, Don't Leave (사랑아 가지마)	Lim Jeong-hee	27
Pair 1	Sweet Voice	Rothy	Lost My Way (잠시 길을 잃다)	015B	72
Pair 2	Jinie	Kyuhyun of Super Junior	I Don't Love You (널 사랑하지 않아)	Urban Zakapa	73
Pair 2	Noodles in Cold Soybean Soup	Bae Seul-ki	Siren (사이렌)	Sunmi	26
Round 3
Finalists	Sweet Voice	Rothy	Is Anyone There? (누구 없소)	Han Young-ae	14
Finalists	Jinie	Kyuhyun of Super Junior	Breath (숨)	Park Hyo-shin	85
Final
Battle	Jinie	Kyuhyun of Super Junior	Previous three songs used as voting standard		55
Battle	Nightingale	Lee Bo-ram of SeeYa	Yesterday, Today And (어제 오늘 그리고)	Cho Yong-pil	44

=== 107th Generation Mask King ===
- Contestants: Kim Young-woo (Sweet Sorrow), Han Min-gwan, Hyun Jin-young, Kwak Jeong-eun, NC.A, Truedy, Byun Jung-soo, MJ (Astro)
Episodes 213 – 214

Episode 213

Episode 213 was broadcast on July 28, 2019. This marks the beginning of the Hundred-seventh Generation.

Order	Stage Name	Real Name	Song	Original artist	Vote
Round 1
Pair 1	Turtle Ship	Kim Young-woo of Sweet Sorrow	Like Rain, Like Music (비처럼 음악처럼)	Kim Hyun-sik	52
Pair 1	Pirate Ship	Han Min-gwan	Like Rain, Like Music (비처럼 음악처럼)	Kim Hyun-sik	47
2nd Song	Pirate Ship	Han Min-gwan	Under the Sky (하늘 아래서)	Kim Min-jong	—
Pair 2	Petrol Station	Hyun Jin-young	Musical (뮤지컬)	Sang A Im-Propp	80
Pair 2	Convenience Store	Kwak Jeong-eun	Musical (뮤지컬)	Sang A Im-Propp	19
2nd Song	Convenience Store	Kwak Jeong-eun	That's Life, Isn't It? (산다는 건 다 그런 게 아니겠니?)	Travel Sketch	—
Pair 3	Sandcastle	NC.A	Caution (경고)	Tashannie	54
Pair 3	Great Wall of China	Truedy	Caution (경고)	Tashannie	45
2nd Song	Great Wall of China	Truedy	Playing with Fire (불장난)	Blackpink	—
Pair 4	Madam	Byun Jung-soo	Just Trust Me (오빠만 믿어)	Park Hyun-bin	22
Pair 4	Chauffeur	MJ of Astro	Just Trust Me (오빠만 믿어)	Park Hyun-bin	77
2nd Song	Madam	Byun Jung-soo	I'll Give the Love That Stays with Me (내게 남은 사랑을 드릴게요)	Jang Hye-ri	—

Episode 214

Episode 214 was broadcast on August 4, 2019.

Order	Stage Name	Real Name	Song	Original artist	Vote
Round 2
Pair 1	Turtle Ship	Kim Young-woo of Sweet Sorrow	How Love is It? (어떻게 사랑이 그래요)	Lee Seung-hwan	41
Pair 1	Petrol Station	Hyun Jin-young	Facing the Desolate Love (사랑 그 쓸쓸함에 대하여)	Yang Hee-eun	58
Pair 2	Sandcastle	NC.A	Beautiful Goodbye (사월이 지나면 우리 헤어져요)	Chen	62
Pair 2	Chauffeur	MJ of Astro	Thorn (가시)	Buzz	37
Round 3
Finalists	Petrol Station	Hyun Jin-young	You're Deep Inside My Heart (내 마음 깊은 곳의 너)	Shin Hae-chul	41
Finalists	Sandcastle	NC.A	At Gwanghwamun (광화문에서)	Kyuhyun	58
Special	Petrol Station	Hyun Jin-young	You in My Faded Memories (흐린 기억 속의 그대)	Hyun Jin-young	—
Final
Battle	Sandcastle	NC.A	Previous three songs used as voting standard		23
Battle	Jinie	Kyuhyun of Super Junior	Breathe (한숨)	Lee Hi	76

=== 108th Generation Mask King ===
- Contestants: Jeong Jun-ha, Park Seong-ho, Tae Jin-ah, Jang Moon-bok (Limitless (band)), Choi Hee, Hongja, Jeong Inseong (KNK), Kang Deok-in (Jang Deok Cheol)
Episodes 215 – 216

Episode 215

Episode 215 was broadcast on August 11, 2019. This marks the beginning of the Hundred-eighth Generation.

Order	Stage Name	Real Name	Song	Original artist	Vote
Round 1
Pair 1	Milk	Jeong Jun-ha	Pilot	Jung Yeon-joon	65
Pair 1	Yogurt	Park Seong-ho	Pilot	Jung Yeon-joon	34
2nd Song	Yogurt	Park Seong-ho	Footsteps (발걸음)	Emerald Castle	—
Pair 2	Idol	Tae Jin-ah	Balloon (풍선)	Five Fingers	53
Pair 2	Two Children	Jang Moon-bok of Limitless	Balloon (풍선)	Five Fingers	46
2nd Song	Two Children	Jang Moon-bok of Limitless	Smile Boy	Lee Seung-gi	—
Pair 3	Beach	Choi Hee	Perhaps Love	J.ae & Howl	33
Pair 3	Water Park	Hongja	Perhaps Love	J.ae & Howl	66
2nd Song	Beach	Choi Hee	I Won't Love (사랑 안 해)	Baek Ji-young	—
Pair 4	Spaceman	Jeong Inseong of KNK	As Time Goes By (세월이 가면)	Choi Ho-seop	35
Pair 4	Teurallo Pite Qus	Kang Deok-in of Jang Deok Cheol	As Time Goes By (세월이 가면)	Choi Ho-seop	64
2nd Song	Spaceman	Jeong Inseong of KNK	Eraser (지우개)	Ali	—

Episode 216

Episode 216 was broadcast on August 18, 2019.

Order	Stage Name	Real Name	Song	Original artist	Vote
Round 2
Pair 1	Milk	Jeong Jun-ha	After Send You (너를 보내고)	YB	24
Pair 1	Idol	Tae Jin-ah	You Who Don't Answer (대답 없는 너)	Kim Jong-seo	75
Pair 2	Water Park	Hongja	Nocturne (녹턴)	Lee Eun-mi	44
Pair 2	Teurallo Pite Qus	Kang Deok-in of Jang Deok Cheol	Through the Night (밤편지)	IU	55
Round 3
Finalists	Idol	Tae Jin-ah	Meeting (만남)	Noh Sa-yeon	29
Finalists	Teurallo Pite Qus	Kang Deok-in of Jang Deok Cheol	Guilty (죽일 놈)	Dynamic Duo	70
Special	Idol	Tae Jin-ah	Companion (동반자)	Tae Jin-ah	—
Final
Battle	Teurallo Pite Qus	Kang Deok-in of Jang Deok Cheol	Previous three songs used as voting standard		27
Battle	Jinie	Kyuhyun of Super Junior	Memory of the Wind (바람기억)	Naul	72

=== 109th Generation Mask King ===
- Contestants: Jin Mi-ryung, Bruno Bruni Jr., Park Gi-ryang, Baek A-yeon, Yoo Sang-moo, Kim In-seok, Kwon In-ha, Hongseok (Pentagon)
Episodes 217 – 218

Episode 217

Episode 217 was broadcast on August 25, 2019. This marks the beginning of the Hundred-ninth Generation.

Order	Stage Name	Real Name	Song	Original artist	Vote
Round 1
Pair 1	Whitney Houston	Jin Mi-ryung	Nobody	Wonder Girls	82
Pair 1	Bodyguard	Bruno Bruni Jr.	Nobody	Wonder Girls	17
2nd Song	Bodyguard	Bruno Bruni Jr.	Addicted Love (중독된 사랑)	Jo Jang-hyuk	—
Pair 2	Bamboo Shoot	Park Gi-ryang	I Love You (너를 사랑해)	S.E.S.	32
Pair 2	Snail Bride	Baek A-yeon	I Love You (너를 사랑해)	S.E.S.	67
2nd Song	Bamboo Shoot	Park Gi-ryang	Farewell for Me (날 위한 이별)	Kim Hye-rim	—
Pair 3	Bath House	Yoo Sang-moo	Feeling Only You (너만을 느끼며)	The Blue	64
Pair 3	Malatang	Kim In-seok	Feeling Only You (너만을 느끼며)	The Blue	35
2nd Song	Malatang	Kim In-seok	Aloha (아로하)	Cool	—
Pair 4	Younggu	Kwon In-ha	Drinking (술이야)	Vibe	52
Pair 4	Daengchiri	Hongseok of Pentagon	Drinking (술이야)	Vibe	47
2nd Song	Daengchiri	Hongseok of Pentagon	Hello	Huh Gak	—

Episode 218

Episode 218 was broadcast on September 1, 2019.

Order	Stage Name	Real Name	Song	Original artist	Vote
Round 2
Pair 1	Whitney Houston	Jin Mi-ryung	Sad Fate (슬픈 인연)	Na-mi	36
Pair 1	Snail Bride	Baek A-yeon	You Mean Everything to Me	Lena Park	63
Pair 2	Bath House	Yoo Sang-moo	Marry Me (결혼해줘)	Im Chang-jung	32
Pair 2	Younggu	Kwon In-ha	Love, ing (열애중)	Ben	67
Round 3
Finalists	Snail Bride	Baek A-yeon	Hui Jae (희재)	Sung Si-kyung	28
Finalists	Younggu	Kwon In-ha	Please (제발)	Lee So-ra	71
Final
Battle	Younggu	Kwon In-ha	Previous three songs used as voting standard		45
Battle	Jinie	Kyuhyun of Super Junior	Energetic (에너제틱)	Wanna One	54

=== 110th Generation Mask King ===
- Contestants: Kim Jung-hyun, Jin Hae-sung, Tiffany (Girls' Generation), Hwang Jae-geun, Sung Jin-hwan (Sweet Sorrow), Mijoo (Lovelyz), Choi Sung-soo, Kwon Hyun-bin
Episodes 219 – 220

Episode 219

Episode 219 was broadcast on September 8, 2019. This marks the beginning of the Hundred-tenth Generation.

Order	Stage Name	Real Name	Song	Original artist	Vote
Round 1
Pair 1	Half-moon Rice Cake	Kim Jung-hyun	The Flight (비상)	Yim Jae-beom	32
Pair 1	Assorted Savory Pancakes	Jin Hae-sung	The Flight (비상)	Yim Jae-beom	67
2nd Song	Half-moon Rice Cake	Kim Jung-hyun	Prelude (서시)	Shin Sung-woo	—
Pair 2	The Rose of Versailles	Tiffany of Girls' Generation	Miss Korea (미스코리아)	Lee Hyori	90
Pair 2	Old Man with a Lump	Hwang Jae-geun	Miss Korea (미스코리아)	Lee Hyori	9
2nd Song	Old Man with a Lump	Hwang Jae-geun	Show	Kim Won-jun	—
Pair 3	Straw Shoes	Sung Jin-hwan of Sweet Sorrow	Say Hello (안부)	Byul & Na Yoon-kwon	52
Pair 3	Flower Shoes	Mijoo of Lovelyz	Say Hello (안부)	Byul & Na Yoon-kwon	47
2nd Song	Flower Shoes	Mijoo of Lovelyz	Gashina (가시나)	Sunmi	—
Pair 4	One's Husband	Choi Sung-soo	One Love Forgotten with Another Love (사랑이 다른 사랑으로 잊혀지네)	Harim	60
Pair 4	My Father-in-law	Kwon Hyun-bin	One Love Forgotten with Another Love (사랑이 다른 사랑으로 잊혀지네)	Harim	39
2nd Song	My Father-in-law	Kwon Hyun-bin	Beautiful Lady (미인)	Shin Jung-hyeon	—

Episode 220

Episode 220 was broadcast on September 15, 2019.

Order	Stage Name	Real Name	Song	Original artist	Vote
Round 2
Pair 1	Assorted Savory Pancakes	Jin Hae-sung	Butterfly (나비야)	Ha Dong-kyun	57
Pair 1	The Rose of Versailles	Tiffany of Girls' Generation	Rose of Betrayal (배반의 장미)	Uhm Jung-hwa	42
Pair 2	Straw Shoes	Sung Jin-hwan of Sweet Sorrow	Time Like a Lie (거짓말 같은 시간)	Toy	36
Pair 2	One's Husband	Choi Sung-soo	Myeong-dong Calling (명동콜링)	Crying Nut	63
Round 3
Finalists	Assorted Savory Pancakes	Jin Hae-sung	Label of Love (사랑의 이름표)	Hyun Chul	23
Finalists	One's Husband	Choi Sung-soo	Tomboy	Hyukoh	76
Final
Battle	One's Husband	Choi Sung-soo	Previous three songs used as voting standard		47
Battle	Jinie	Kyuhyun of Super Junior	Uphill Road (오르막길)	Yoon Jong-shin ft. Jung-in	52

=== 111th Generation Mask King ===
- Contestants: Shin Ji (Koyote), Kang Sung-min, Kim Na-hee, Seo Joo-kyung, Younghoon (The Boyz), Lee Won-il, Lee Seok-hoon (SG Wannabe), Lee Jini
Episodes 221 – 222

Episode 221

Episode 221 was broadcast on September 22, 2019. This marks the beginning of the Hundred-eleventh Generation.

Order	Stage Name	Real Name	Song	Original artist	Vote
Round 1
Pair 1	Lizard	Shin Ji of Koyote	My Love by My Side (내 사랑 내 곁에)	Kim Hyun-sik	67
Pair 1	Penguin	Kang Sung-min	My Love by My Side (내 사랑 내 곁에)	Kim Hyun-sik	32
2nd Song	Penguin	Kang Sung-min	That Was What Happened Then (그땐 그랬지)	Carnival	—
Pair 2	Wastepaper	Kim Na-hee	8282	Davichi	58
Pair 2	Tissue	Seo Joo-kyung	8282	Davichi	41
2nd Song	Tissue	Seo Joo-kyung	If I Leave (나 가거든)	Sumi Jo	—
Pair 3	Alien	Younghoon of The Boyz	This Song (이 노래)	2AM	72
Pair 3	Lee Gyein	Lee Won-il	This Song (이 노래)	2AM	27
2nd Song	Lee Gyein	Lee Won-il	Dream (꿈)	Lee Hyun-woo	—
Pair 4	Handsome Guy	Lee Seok-hoon of SG Wannabe	Hawaiian Couple	Humming Urban Stereo	79
Pair 4	Beautiful Woman	Lee Jini	Hawaiian Couple	Humming Urban Stereo	20
2nd Song	Beautiful Woman	Lee Jini	Love Battery (사랑의 배터리)	Hong Jin-young	—

Episode 222

Episode 222 was broadcast on September 29, 2019.

Order	Stage Name	Real Name	Song	Original artist	Vote
Round 2
Pair 1	Lizard	Shin Ji of Koyote	Unreasonable Reason (이유같지 않은 이유)	Park Mi-kyung	52
Pair 1	Wastepaper	Kim Na-hee	Starry Night (별이 빛나는 밤)	Mamamoo	47
Pair 2	Alien	Younghoon of The Boyz	The First Snow (첫 눈) (Guardian: The Lonely and Great God OST)	Jung Joon-il	17
Pair 2	Handsome Guy	Lee Seok-hoon of SG Wannabe	If It Was Me (나였으면)	Na Yoon-kwon	82
Round 3
Finalists	Lizard	Shin Ji of Koyote	You Let Me Go with a Smile (미소를 띄우며 나를 보낸 그 모습처럼)	Lee Eun-ha	21
Finalists	Handsome Guy	Lee Seok-hoon of SG Wannabe	Hug Me (안아줘)	Jung Joon-il	78
Final
Battle	Handsome Guy	Lee Seok-hoon of SG Wannabe	Previous three songs used as voting standard		53
Battle	Jinie	Kyuhyun of Super Junior	Y Si Fuera Ella (혜야)	Shinee	46

=== 112th Generation Mask King ===
- Contestants: Song Ha-ye, Eli Kim, Roh Ji-hoon, Xitsuh, Lee Ah-hyun, Eru, Jeon Yoo-na, Yujin (CLC)
Episodes 223 – 224

Episode 223

Episode 223 was broadcast on October 6, 2019. This marks the beginning of the Hundred-twelfth Generation.

Order	Stage Name	Real Name	Song	Original artist	Vote
Round 1
Pair 1	Pig Hocks	Song Ha-ye	Joah (좋아)	Jay Park	61
Pair 1	Muk	Eli Kim	Joah (좋아)	Jay Park	38
2nd Song	Muk	Eli Kim	Crooked (삐딱하게)	G-Dragon	—
Pair 2	Monday Sickness	Roh Ji-hoon	Spring Breeze (봄바람)	Wanna One	90
Pair 2	The 8th Grade Syndrome	Xitsuh	Spring Breeze (봄바람)	Wanna One	9
2nd Song	The 8th Grade Syndrome	Xitsuh	Stalker (스토커)	10cm	—
Pair 3	Girl Scouts	Lee Ah-hyun	Dream	Suzy & Baekhyun	28
Pair 3	Boy Scouts	Eru	Dream	Suzy & Baekhyun	71
2nd Song	Girl Scouts	Lee Ah-hyun	I Will Survive (난 괜찮아)	Jinju	—
Pair 4	Hardtack	Jeon Yoo-na	If It Is You (너였다면) (Another Miss Oh OST)	Jung Seung-hwan	60
Pair 4	Star Candy	Yujin of CLC	If It Is You (너였다면) (Another Miss Oh OST)	Jung Seung-hwan	39
2nd Song	Star Candy	Yujin of CLC	I'm Feeling Good Day (예감 좋은 날)	Rumble Fish	—

Episode 224

Episode 224 was broadcast on October 13, 2019.

Order	Stage Name	Real Name	Song	Original artist	Vote
Round 2
Pair 1	Pig Hocks	Song Ha-ye	Back in Time (시간을 거슬러)	Lyn	44
Pair 1	Monday Sickness	Roh Ji-hoon	Try (노력)	Park Won	55
Pair 2	Boy Scouts	Eru	I Love You	The Position	45
Pair 2	Hardtack	Jeon Yoo-na	Rain	Taeyeon	54
Round 3
Finalists	Monday Sickness	Roh Ji-hoon	Scream (소리쳐)	Lee Seung-chul	52
Finalists	Hardtack	Jeon Yoo-na	Lean on My Shoulders (나의 어깨에 기대어요)	10cm	47
Final
Battle	Monday Sickness	Roh Ji-hoon	Previous three songs used as voting standard		17
Battle	Handsome Guy	Lee Seok-hoon of SG Wannabe	Please Forget Me (날 그만 잊어요)	Gummy	82

=== 113th Generation Mask King ===
- Contestants: Kang Se-jung, Woo Jin-young (D1ce), Choiza (Dynamic Duo), Oh Na-mi, Joo Young-hoon, Bbaek Ga (Koyote), Lee Jae-hwang, Wendy (Red Velvet)
Episodes 225 – 226

Episode 225

Episode 225 was broadcast on October 20, 2019. This marks the beginning of the Hundred-thirteenth Generation.

Order	Stage Name	Real Name	Song	Original artist	Vote
Round 1
Pair 1	Grilled Jumbo Shrimp	Kang Se-jung	What's the Matter (왜 그래)	Kim Hyun-chul	34
Pair 1	Soy Sauce Marinated Crab	Woo Jin-young of D1ce	What's the Matter (왜 그래)	Kim Hyun-chul	65
2nd Song	Grilled Jumbo Shrimp	Kang Se-jung	Cloudy All Day Today in Seoul (오늘 서울은 하루종일 맑음)	Toy & Younha	—
Pair 2	Eggplant	Choiza of Dynamic Duo	Sending My Love (송인)	Cool	59
Pair 2	Turnip	Oh Na-mi	Sending My Love (송인)	Cool	40
2nd Song	Turnip	Oh Na-mi	So-So (쏘쏘)	Baek A-yeon	—
Pair 3	Eminem	Joo Young-hoon	Season in the Sun (Korean version) (Original version's artist: Tube)	Jung Jae-wook	52
Pair 3	Halminem	Bbaek Ga of Koyote	Season in the Sun (Korean version) (Original version's artist: Tube)	Jung Jae-wook	47
2nd Song	Halminem	Bbaek Ga of Koyote	Two Melodies (뻔한 멜로디)	Zion.T	—
Pair 4	Pumpkin Ghost	Lee Jae-hwang	Together (함께)	Kim Gun-mo & Park Gwang-hyun	36
Pair 4	Green Witch	Wendy of Red Velvet	Together (함께)	Kim Gun-mo & Park Gwang-hyun	63
2nd Song	Pumpkin Ghost	Lee Jae-hwang	After the Love Has Gone (사랑한 후에)	Leon Lai	—

Episode 226

Episode 226 was broadcast on October 27, 2019.

Order	Stage Name	Real Name	Song	Original artist	Vote
Round 2
Pair 1	Soy Sauce Marinated Crab	Woo Jin-young of D1ce	Gather My Tears (내 눈물 모아)	Seo Ji-won	48
Pair 1	Eggplant	Choiza of Dynamic Duo	Sleepless Rainy Night (잠 못 드는 밤 비는 내리고)	Kim Gun-mo	51
Pair 2	Eminem	Joo Young-hoon	I Love You (사랑합니다)	Tim	30
Pair 2	Green Witch	Wendy of Red Velvet	Amazing You (그대라는 사치)	Han Dong-geun	69
Round 3
Finalists	Eggplant	Choiza of Dynamic Duo	Gondry (공드리)	Hyukoh	28
Finalists	Green Witch	Wendy of Red Velvet	Love over Thousand Years (천년의 사랑)	Park Wan-kyu	71
Final
Battle	Green Witch	Wendy of Red Velvet	Previous three songs used as voting standard		44
Battle	Handsome Guy	Lee Seok-hoon of SG Wannabe	Love Me Right	Exo	55

=== 114th Generation Mask King ===
- Contestants: Lee Se-eun, Sook Haeng, Wonpil (Day6), Kim Bo-hee (Mono), Kim Woo-ri, Yerin (GFriend), Lim Jae-hyun, Nilo
Episodes 227 – 228

Episode 227

Episode 227 was broadcast on November 3, 2019. This marks the beginning of the Hundred-fourteenth Generation.

Order	Stage Name	Real Name	Song	Original artist	Vote
Round 1
Pair 1	Wonder Girls	Lee Se-eun	When Love Passes (사랑이 지나가면)	Lee Moon-sae	25
Pair 1	Dried Pollack	Sook Haeng	When Love Passes (사랑이 지나가면)	Lee Moon-sae	74
2nd Song	Wonder Girls	Lee Se-eun	Scattered Days (흩어진 나날들)	Kang Susie	—
Pair 2	Pager	Wonpil of Day6	The Practical Usage of Sadness (슬픔활용법)	Kim Bum-soo	56
Pair 2	Payphone	Kim Bo-hee of Mono	The Practical Usage of Sadness (슬픔활용법)	Kim Bum-soo	43
2nd Song	Pay Phone	Kim Bo-hee of Mono	You're the Only One for Me (오직 너뿐인 나를)	Lee Seung-chul	—
Special	Pay Phone	Kim Bo-hee of Mono	You Are Always (넌 언제나)	Mono	—
Pair 3	Bubble Tea	Kim Woo-ri	Running (달리기)	Nodance	47
Pair 3	Fat Macaron	Yerin of GFriend	Running (달리기)	Nodance	52
2nd Song	Bubble Tea	Kim Woo-ri	Come Back to Me (와줘)	Se7en	—
Pair 4	Nab-ddeuk	Lim Jae-hyun	Because I Love You (사랑하기 때문에)	Yoo Jae-ha	47
Pair 4	JJondeugi	Nilo	Because I Love You (사랑하기 때문에)	Yoo Jae-ha	52
2nd Song	Nab-ddeuk	Lim Jae-hyun	Farewell Taxi (이별택시)	Kim Yeon-woo	—

Episode 228

Episode 228 was broadcast on November 10, 2019.

Order	Stage Name	Real Name	Song	Original artist	Vote
Round 2
Pair 1	Dried Pollack	Sook Haeng	Sad Salsa	Baek Ji-young	53
Pair 1	Pager	Wonpil of Day6	All About You (그대라는 시) (Hotel del Luna OST)	Taeyeon	46
Pair 2	Fat Macaron	Yerin of GFriend	Password 486 (비밀번호 486)	Younha	25
Pair 2	JJondeugi	Nilo	When Flowering Spring Comes (꽃피는 봄이 오면)	BMK	74
Round 3
Finalists	Dried Pollack	Sook Haeng	To You (너에게)	The Position	34
Finalists	JJondeugi	Nilo	Love Is Always Thirsty (사랑은 언제나 목마르다)	Youme	65
Final
Battle	JJondeugi	Nilo	Previous three songs used as voting standard		20
Battle	Handsome Guy	Lee Seok-hoon of SG Wannabe	An Essay of Memory (기억의 습작)	Exhibition	79

=== 115th Generation Mask King ===
- Contestants: Moon Tae-il (NCT), Song Ha-young (Fromis 9), Eric Nam, Lee Chae-young, Ji Woo (Emerald Castle), Kim Kang-hyun, Kim Do-kyoon (Baekdusan), Kim Kyung-rok (V.O.S)
Episodes 229 – 230

Episode 229

Episode 229 was broadcast on November 17, 2019. This marks the beginning of the Hundred-fifteenth Generation.

Order	Stage Name	Real Name	Song	Original artist	Vote
Round 1
Pair 1	King Card	Taeil of NCT	Across the Universe (우주를 건너)	Baek Ye-rin	43
Pair 1	Queen Card	Song Ha-young of Fromis 9	Across the Universe (우주를 건너)	Baek Ye-rin	56
2nd Song	King Card	Taeil of NCT	To You My Light (오늘도 빛나는 너에게)	Maktub ft. Lee Raon	—
Pair 2	Broccoli	Eric Nam	Missing You	Fly to the Sky	67
Pair 2	Beetroot	Lee Chae-young	Missing You	Fly to the Sky	32
2nd Song	Beetroot	Lee Chae-young	I Am Me (나는 나)	Juju Club	—
Pair 3	Fortune of the Day	Ji Woo of Emerald Castle	Don't Be Sad (슬픈 표정 하지 말아요)	Shin Hae-chul	71
Pair 3	Weather of the Day	Kim Kang-hyun	Don't Be Sad (슬픈 표정 하지 말아요)	Shin Hae-chul	28
2nd Song	Weather of the Day	Kim Kang-hyun	Where the Wind Comes From (바람이 불어오는 곳)	Kim Kwang-seok	—
Pair 4	Zeus	Kim Do-kyoon of Baekdusan	The More I Love (사랑할수록)	Boohwal	22
Pair 4	Cupid	Kim Kyung-rok of V.O.S	The More I Love (사랑할수록)	Boohwal	77
2nd Song	Zeus	Kim Do-kyoon of Baekdusan	The Dance in Rhythm (리듬 속의 그 춤을)	Kim Wan-sun	—

Episode 230

Episode 230 was broadcast on November 24, 2019.

Order	Stage Name	Real Name	Song	Original artist	Vote
Round 2
Pair 1	Queen Card	Song Ha-young of Fromis 9	Dear Name (이름에게)	IU	48
Pair 1	Broccoli	Eric Nam	For You (너를 위해)	Yim Jae-beom	51
Pair 2	Fortune of the Day	Ji Woo of Emerald Castle	I Will Go to You Like the First Snow (첫눈처럼 너에게 가겠다)	Ailee	37
Pair 2	Cupid	Kim Kyung-rok of V.O.S	Eternity (영원)	SKY	62
Special	Fortune of the Day	Ji Woo of Emerald Castle	Footsteps (발걸음)	Emerald Castle	—
Round 3
Finalists	Broccoli	Eric Nam	Fate (인연)	Lee Seung-chul	34
Finalists	Cupid	Kim Kyung-rok of V.O.S	Beautiful Goodbye (아름다운 이별)	Kim Gun-mo	65
Final
Battle	Cupid	Kim Kyung-rok of V.O.S	Previous three songs used as voting standard		31
Battle	Handsome Guy	Lee Seok-hoon of SG Wannabe	Heaven	Ailee	68

=== 116th Generation Mask King ===
- Contestants: Soobin (WJSN), Cha Ye-rin, Kwak Yoon-gy, Lee Min-gyu (Mr. 2), Vinxen, J-Us (ONF), Lee Seung-woo (Soulstar), Soya
Episodes 231 – 232

Episode 231

Episode 231 was broadcast on December 1, 2019. This marks the beginning of the Hundred-sixteenth Generation.

Order	Stage Name	Real Name	Song	Original artist	Vote
Round 1
Pair 1	Dice	Soobin of Cosmic Girls	Some Day (언젠가는)	Lee Tzsche	67
Pair 1	Rock Paper Scissors	Cha Ye-rin	Some Day (언젠가는)	Lee Tzsche	32
2nd Song	Rock Paper Scissors	Cha Ye-rin	I Fell in Love (난 사랑에 빠졌죠)	Park Ji-yoon	—
Pair 2	Clout	Kwak Yoon-gy	The Flowers (꽃송이가)	Busker Busker	23
Pair 2	Roasted Chestnuts	Lee Min-gyu of Mr. 2	The Flowers (꽃송이가)	Busker Busker	76
2nd Song	Clout	Kwak Yoon-gy	As Always (언제나)	Huh Gak	—
Pair 3	Goat	Vinxen	Losing Heart (마음을 잃다)	Nell	41
Pair 3	Park Shinyang	J-Us of ONF	Losing Heart (마음을 잃다)	Nell	58
2nd Song	Goat	Vinxen	Tonight I'm Afraid of the Dark (오늘밤은 어둠이 무서워요)	10cm	—
Pair 4	Yu Sanseul	Lee Seung-woo of Soulstar	Black Glasses (까만안경)	Eru	52
Pair 4	Sweet and Sour Pork	Soya	Black Glasses (까만안경)	Eru	47
2nd Song	Sweet and Sour Pork	Soya	I'll Back Off So You Can Live Better (꺼져 줄게 잘 살아)	G.NA	—

Episode 232

Episode 232 was broadcast on December 8, 2019.

Order	Stage Name	Real Name	Song	Original artist	Vote
Round 2
Pair 1	Dice	Soobin of Cosmic Girls	Fine	Taeyeon	31
Pair 1	Roasted Chestnuts	Lee Min-gyu of Mr. 2	Sad Promise (슬픈 언약식)	Kim Jung-min	68
Pair 2	Park Shinyang	J-Us of ONF	To Heaven	Jo Sung-mo	34
Pair 2	Yu Sanseul	Lee Seung-woo of Soulstar	Boy with Luv (작은 것들을 위한 시)	BTS	65
Round 3
Finalists	Roasted Chestnuts	Lee Min-gyu of Mr. 2	Snow Flower (눈의 꽃)	Park Hyo-shin	23
Finalists	Yu Sanseul	Lee Seung-woo of Soulstar	Then Something (그런 일은)	Hwayobi	76
Special	Roasted Chestnuts	Lee Min-gyu of Mr. 2	White Winter (하얀 겨울)	Mr. 2	—
Final
Battle	Yu Sanseul	Lee Seung-woo of Soulstar	Previous three songs used as voting standard		17
Battle	Handsome Guy	Lee Seok-hoon of SG Wannabe	Only I Didn't Know (나만 몰랐던 이야기)	IU	82

=== 117th Generation Mask King ===
- Contestants: Hyuk (VIXX), Jo Soo-won, Yeo One (Pentagon), Son Tae-jin (Forte di Quattro), ONLEE (1the9), Park Sun-young, So Chan-whee, Yein (Lovelyz)
Episodes 233 – 234

Episode 233

Episode 233 was broadcast on December 15, 2019. This marks the beginning of the Hundred-seventeenth Generation.

Order	Stage Name	Real Name	Song	Original artist	Vote
Round 1
Pair 1	Sport Car	Hyuk of VIXX	If You Come into My Heart (그대 내 맘에 들어오면은)	Jo Deok-bae	69
Pair 1	Rear Car	Jo Soo-won	If You Come into My Heart (그대 내 맘에 들어오면은)	Jo Deok-bae	30
2nd Song	Rear Car	Jo Soo-won	Piled Up with Longing (그리움만 쌓이네)	Yeojin	—
Pair 2	Cat Boy	Yeo One of Pentagon	Memory (Musical Cats OST)	Andrew Lloyd Webber	37
Pair 2	Cat Man	Son Tae-jin of Forte di Quattro	Memory (Musical Cats OST)	Andrew Lloyd Webber	62
2nd Song	Cat Boy	Yeo One of Pentagon	My Heart Isn't Like That (내 맘이 안 그래)	Lee Seung-hwan	—
Pair 3	Sliced Bread	Lee Seung-hwan of 1the9	What is Love (Another Miss Oh OST) (사랑이 뭔데)	Seo Hyun-jin & Yoo Seung-woo	75
Pair 3	Waffle	Park Sun-young	What is Love (Another Miss Oh OST) (사랑이 뭔데)	Seo Hyun-jin & Yoo Seung-woo	24
2nd Song	Waffle	Park Sun-young	Love is as Like a Fragile Glass (사랑은 유리 같은 것)	Won Joon-hee	—
Pair 4	Sweet 18	So Chan-whee	The Covered Up Road (가리워진 길)	Yoo Jae-ha	63
Pair 4	Thumbelina	Yein of Lovelyz	The Covered Up Road (가리워진 길)	Yoo Jae-ha	36
2nd Song	Thumbelina	Yein of Lovelyz	I Miss You	Soyou	—

Episode 234

Episode 234 was broadcast on December 22, 2019.

Order	Stage Name	Real Name	Song	Original artist	Vote
Round 2
Pair 1	Sport Car	Hyuk of VIXX	Prayer (기도) (Autumn in My Heart OST)	Jung Il-young	30
Pair 1	Cat Man	Son Tae-jin of Forte di Quattro	It's Only You (당신만이)	Lee Chi-hyun & His Friends	69
Pair 2	Sliced Bread	Lee Seung-hwan of 1the9	Flower Road (꽃길)	Big Bang	27
Pair 2	Sweet 18	So Chan-whee	Waiting Everyday (매일 매일 기다려)	T.△.S	72
Round 3
Finalists	Cat Man	Son Tae-jin of Forte di Quattro	That's Enough (이제 그만)	Lee So-ra	28
Finalists	Sweet 18	So Chan-whee	That's Only My World (그것만이 내 세상)	Deulgukhwa	71
Final
Battle	Sweet 18	So Chan-whee	Previous three songs used as voting standard		52
Battle	Handsome Guy	Lee Seok-hoon of SG Wannabe	Do You Want to Walk with Me (같이 걸을까)	Lee Juck	47

=== 118th Generation Mask King ===
- Contestants: Greg Priester, DDotty, Kang Seung-sik (Victon), Choi Jeong-hwan (M To M), Naeun (April), Oh Jeong-yeon, Harisu, Park Bom
Episode 235

Episode 235 was broadcast on December 29, 2019. This marks the beginning of the Hundred-eighteenth Generation.

Order	Stage Name	Real Name	Song	Original artist	Vote
Round 1
Pair 1	Hold Your Course	Greg Priester	U	Super Junior	64
Pair 1	A Short-lived Resolve	DDotty	U	Super Junior	35
2nd Song	A Short-lived Resolve	DDotty	Karaoke (노래방에서)	Jang Beom-june	—
Pair 2	Diary	Kang Seung-sik of Victon	Watercolor of a Rainy Day (비오는 날 수채화)	Kang In-won & Kwon In-ha & Kim Hyun-sik	48
Pair 2	Bruce Lee	Choi Jeong-hwan of M To M	Watercolor of a Rainy Day (비오는 날 수채화)	Kang In-won & Kwon In-ha & Kim Hyun-sik	51
2nd Song	Diary	Kang Seung-sik of Victon	I Want to Fall in Love (사랑에 빠지고 싶다)	Johan Kim	—
Pair 3	Lemon	Naeun of April	Love Me Love Me	Lee Ji-hye	75
Pair 3	Avocado	Oh Jeong-yeon	Love Me Love Me	Lee Ji-hye	24
2nd Song	Avocado	Oh Jeong-yeon	Confession (고백)	Delispice	—
Pair 4	The Year 2019 Is Coming to an End	Harisu	Lonely Love (혼자한 사랑)	Kim Hyun-jung	37
Pair 4	2020 is Coming	Park Bom	Lonely Love (혼자한 사랑)	Kim Hyun-jung	62
2nd Song	The Year 2019 Is Coming to an End	Harisu	Call the Soul (초혼)	Jang Yoon-jeong	—
