= Flaming Nuts =

Studio album by Crying Nut
- Released: 7 June 2013
- Recorded: TOBADA Studio(Seoul Korea); TONE Studio( Five Minute Laundry, The Pirate’s Path)
- Genre: Post-punk, indie rock, alternative rock
- Length: 39:03
- Label: Loen Entertainment
- Producer: Crying Nut

Crying Nut chronology
Uncomfortable Party (2009)	Flaming Nuts (2013)

Flaming Nuts (FLAMING NUTS) is the seventh studio album by Korean rock band Crying Nut. There hides a Bonus Track only for CD. Music videos for "Give me the money", "Lego", " Five Minute Laundry" are on YouTube.
When this album was released, Crying Nut sued CNBLUE for copyright infringement. And then CNBLUE countersued for defamation of character and an injunction against Crying Nut's online criticisms. But the court rejected CNBLUE's assertion.

== Track listing ==
All tracks are written by Crying Nut Actual composers listed below.

No.	Title	Writer(s)	Length
1.	"The Pirate’s Path"	Lee, Sang-Hyuk	3:00
2.	"Give Me the Money"	Lee, Sang-Hyuk	4:15
3.	"Lego"	Han, Kyung-Rok	3:55
4.	"Unknown Universe"	Lee, Sang-Myun	5:25
5.	"Five Minute Laundry"	Han, Kyung-Rok	5:17
6.	"Peanut"	Lee, Sang-Hyuk	2:17
7.	"New Shoes"	Lee, Sang-Myun	4:30
8.	"Happy Go Lucky Guy"	Han, Kyung-Rok	2:31
9.	"Self Happy Christmas & New Year"	Lee, Sang-Hyuk	3:50
10.	"Summer"	Kim, In-Soo	3:12
11.	"Bonus Track"		0:51
Total length:			39:03

== Personnel ==
- Park, Yoon-Sik – vocal, guitar
- Lee, Sang-Myun – guitar
- Han, kyung-Rok – bass
- Lee, Sang-Hyuk – drums
- Kim, In-Soo – Keyboards

=== Additional personnel ===
- Gahng, Hae-Jin - Violin (The Pirate’s Path)
- Kim, Hyun-Jung - Featuring (Happy Go Lucky Guy)
