= Uncomfortable Party =

Studio album by Crying Nut
- Released: 10 August 2009
- Recorded: Tobada Studio (Seoul)
- Genre: Post-punk, indie rock, alternative rock
- Length: 53:55
- Label: Loen Entertainment
- Producer: Crying Nut

Crying Nut chronology
Milk Cattle at the OK Corral (2006)	Uncomfortable Party (2009)	FLAMING NUTS (2013)

Uncomfortable Party (불편한 파티) is the sixth studio album by Korean Rock Band Crying Nut(Seoul Korea). Music videos for Good Boy, Uncomfortable Party, Dove, Ghost MIA were opened on YouTube. Crying Nut had their new album's Showcase at the Melon AX(Seoul Korea). The music video director Kim, Bo-Rahm later said, this was the funniest and happiest job he'd ever had. From this Album, Crying Nut possessed their own studio 'Tobada', so they would make their album independently. Thanks to this system, they could spend over 4 months to record Gold Rush which has a combination of art rock and metal rock. Dove was the biggest hit song for this album.
Only for CDs, there is a hidden video clip.

== Track listing ==
All tracks are written by Crying Nut Actual composers listed below.

No.	Title	Writer(s)	Length
1.	"Crying Nut Song"	Han, kyung-Rok	2:15
2.	"Good Boy"	Han, kyung-Rok	4:13
3.	"Uncomfortable Party"	Lee, Sang-Hyuk	3:43
4.	"Luna"	Lee, Sang-Hyuk	4:00
5.	"Drunken Paradise"	Kim, In-Soo	2:47
6.	"Dove"	Han, kyung-Rok	2:04
7.	"Ghost MIA"	Lee, Sang-Hyuk	3:59
8.	"Wake Up"	Lee, Sang-Myun	4:37
9.	"Leave"	Lee, Sang-Myun	4:50
10.	"Coffee Story"	Kim, In-Soo	4:55
11.	"Rose Bang"	Han, Kyung-Rok	4:06
12.	"Vacancy"	Lee, Sang-Hyuk	4:37
13.	"Happy Birthday"	Han, kyung-Rok	1:49
14.	"Gold Rush"	Lee, Sang-Hyuk	6:00
Total length:			53:55

== Personnel ==
- Park, Yoon-Sik – vocal, guitar
- Lee, Sang-Myun – guitar
- Han, kyung-Rok – bass
- Lee, Sang-Hyuk – drums
- Kim, In-Soo – accordion, organ

=== Additional personnel ===
- Choi, Chul-wook - trombone (Leave, Coffee Story)
- Oh, Jung-Seok - trumpet (Leave, Coffee Story)
- Jung, Jae-Hyun - saxophone (Leave, Coffee Story)
- Yi, Jah-Rahm - featuring (Leave)
- Hong, Cho-Yeon - narration (Coffee Story)
- Go, Ah-Sung - 'Attention, Bow' (Good Boy)
