= Circus Magic Clowns =

Studio album by Crying Nut
- Released: November 5, 1999
- Genre: Punk rock, indie rock, alternative rock
- Length: 53:40
- Label: DMR
- Producer: Lee, Suk Moon / Crying Nut

Crying Nut chronology
Speed Up Losers (1998)	Circus Magic Clowns (1999)	Poor Hand Love Song (2001)

Circus Magic Clowns (서커스 매직 유량단) is the second studio album of the South Korean punk band Crying Nut. It was released in 1999 and is known for the title track Circus Magic Clown. The keyboard player Kim, In-Soo became an official member after the release of this album.

== Track listing ==
All tracks are written by Crying Nut Actual composers listed below.

No.	Title	Writer(s)	Length
1.	"Circus Magic Clowns"	Han, kyung-Rock	4:03
2.	"Funny Song"	Lee, Sang-Myun	2:48
3.	"Stand On the Riverside"	Crying Nut	2:25
4.	"Grasshopper"	Han, kyung-Rock	4:22
5.	"All Die"	Han, kyung-Rock	6:48
6.	"Dirty City"	Han, kyung-Rock	3:15
7.	"Soldier 230"	Lee, Sang-Myun	2:52
8.	"Escape(Over the Velly of Wind)"	Han, kyung-Rock	6:21
9.	"Take It Off"	Crying Nut	1:26
10.	"Broadway AM03:00"	Lee, Sang-Myun	4:00
11.	"S.F (Science Fiction)"	Lee, Sang-Hyuk	4:55
12.	"Straw Man"	Han, kyung-Rock	6:14
13.	"Guerrilla Rainstorm"	Lee, Sang-Hyuk/Crying Nut	4:09
Total length:			53:40

== Personnel ==
- Park, Yoon-Sick – vocal, guitar
- Lee, Sang-Myun – guitar, vocal
- Han, kyung-Rock – bass, vocal
- Lee, Sang-Hyuk – drums, vocal
- Kim, In-Soo – Accordion, keyboard, vocal
