= Poor Hand Love Song =

Studio album by Crying Nut
- Released: June 1, 2001
- Genre: Indie rock, hardcore punk, alternative rock
- Length: 56:09
- Label: Drug Records
- Producer: Swan / Crying Nut

Crying Nut chronology
Circus Magic Clowns (1999)	Poor Hand Love Song (2001)	The Secondhand Radio (2002)

Poor Hand Love Song (하수연가) is the third studio album of the Korean rock band Crying Nut. Oh! What a Shiny Night was a perhaps the biggest hit off the album whilst 'Vicious song' is included in the original sound track of 'Kick the Moon'(신라의 달밤).

This is widely regarded as Crying Nut's best album before their military Service period.

== Track listing ==
All tracks are written by Crying Nut Actual composers listed below

No.	Title	Writer(s)	Length
1.	"Find Bruce Lee!!"	Crying Nut	5:24
2.	"Chronic Fatigue"	Lee, Sang-Hyuk/Lee, Sang-Hyuk & Han, kyung-Rock	1:43
3.	"Oh! What a Shiny Night"	Han, kyung-Rock	4:08
4.	"Vicious Song"	Kim, In-Soo	3:12
5.	"Red Room"	Han, kyung-Rock	5:32
6.	"The Poppy"	Han, kyung-Rock	5:30
7.	"Not Funny Story"	Kim, In-Soo/Lee, Sang-Myun & Kim, In-Soo	3:33
8.	"Annular Eclipse"	Lee, Sang-Myun	4:58
9.	"Honey"	Lee, Sang-Hyuk	4:21
10.	"Fireworks"	Lee, Sang-Hyuk	4:35
11.	"The King of Comedy"	Han, kyung-Rock	1:33
12.	"Sinkhole"	Crying Nut	3:34
13.	"No Clue"	Lee, Sang-Myun	8:06
Total length:			56:09

== Personnel ==
- Park, Yoon-Sick – vocal
- Lee, Sang-Myun – guitar, voice
- Han, kyung-Rock – bass, voice
- Lee, Sang-Hyuk – drums, voice
- Kim, In-Soo – Accordion, Organ
