= The Secondhand Radio =

Studio album by Crying Nut
- Released: December 2002
- Recorded: KOCCA Studio(Seoul Korea)
- Genre: Indie rock, punk rock, alternative rock
- Length: 1:05:56
- Label: Drug Records
- Producer: Lee, Suk Moon / Crying Nut

Crying Nut chronology
Poor Hand Love Song (2001)	The Secondhand Radio (2002)	Milk Cattle at the OK Corral (2006)

The Secondhand Radio (고물라디오) is the 4th official studio album of South Korean Rock Band Crying Nut. Despite their four member's military service period right after releasing this album, Quick Service man, Deathblow Offside got hits and their classic songs were still loved by the public. Deathblow Offside 's original song was recorded as the 2002 FIFA World Cup Cheer for South Korea Which included Real Madrid's cheer's melody, but Deathblow Offside was arranged to include only Crying Nut's original writing.

== Track listing ==
All tracks are written by Crying Nut Actual composers listed below

No.	Title	Writer(s)	Length
1.	"The Secondhand Radio"	Han, kyung-Rock	4:33
2.	"Deathblow Offside"	Lee, Sang-Hyuk & Crying Nut/Lee, Sang-Hyuk	4:06
3.	"Raccoon"	Lee, Sang-Myun	4:17
4.	"Quick Service Man"	Lee, Sang-Hyuk	3:42
5.	"Socrates Club"	Han, kyung-Rock	3:17
6.	"Audrey"	Lee, Sang-Hyuk	5:23
7.	"Golden Wagon"	Han, kyung-Rock	5:12
8.	"Death Song"	Kim, In-Soo	2:18
9.	"WTF Tiger"	Lee, Sang-Hyuk	5:11
10.	"Oh My 007"	Han, kyung-Rock	3:09
11.	"Shepherd’s Logbook"	Han, kyung-Rock	6:22
12.	"Dog Talk"	Lee, Sang-Myun	5:31
13.	"Fireworks"	Han, kyung-Rock	3:44
14.	"White Shoes"	Kim, In-Soo	2:17
15.	"Cricket Tune"	Whiru & Lee, Sang-Myun/Lee, Sang-Myun	6:54
Total length:			1:05:56

== Personnel ==
- Park, Yoon-Sick – vocal, guitar
- Lee, Sang-Myun – guitar, voice
- Han, kyung-Rock – bass, voice
- Lee, Sang-Hyuk – drums, voice
- Kim, In-Soo – Accordion, Organ
