= Crying Nut =

South Korean punk rock band

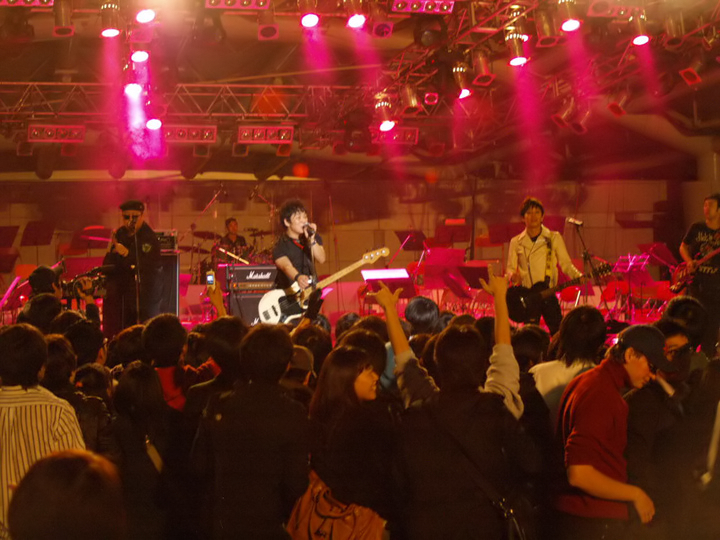
- Crying Nut at Hanyang University Festival

Background information
- Origin: Seoul, South Korea
- Genres: Punk rock, post-punk, new wave, indie rock, hardcore punk
- Years active: 1993–present
- Labels: Drug Records
- Members: Park Yoon-Sik; Lee Sang-Myun; Lee Sang-Hyuk; Han Kyung-Rock(Captain Rock); Kim In-soo
- Website: CryingNut.kr

Crying Nut (Korean: 크라잉넛) is a punk rock band from South Korea. They are often credited as being pioneers of the Korean punk rock and indie rock scenes.

The group began performing in 1995 in the Hongdae club scene in Seoul. They released their debut album, Speed Up Losers, in 1998, selling over 100,000 copies. Crying Nut became a household name in South Korea following their performances at the 2002 FIFA World Cup. The group has released eight full-length albums as of 2018.

== Joseon Punk ==
In the 1990s, the Korean public was being exposed to many foreign musical styles for the first time, following new political freedom. The early punk bands including Crying Nut incorporated foreign genres in new and unusual ways, while still reflecting their inherent Koreanness. They branded themselves Chosun Punk (now romanized as Joseon Punk) in light of this duality. This tight-knit movement is credited with birthing independent music in Korea.

== Overseas tours ==
Crying Nut has extensively toured outside of Korea, having been to Japan numerous times, as well as China, Germany, Singapore, the US, the UK, and Sweden. They played the Fuji Rock Festival in 2000, Trastock Festival in Sweden, and Singapore's Mosaic Music Festival in 2008. Following up on their fame from the 2002 World Cup, they performed at the welcoming ceremony of the 2006 FIFA World Cup in Germany. Their first concert in America was at the Seattle Korean Festival in 2006, and their first concert in the UK was the London Korean Festival in 2006.

They performed at SXSW in 2012 and toured North America as part of the Seoulsonic 2K12 tour funded by KOCCA alongside 3rd Line Butterfly and Yellow Monsters. Reportedly the police came to their SXSW gig due to concerns the venue might collapse because of the audience jumping. They also played at the Canadian Music Week for a special music showcase sponsored by Korea's Ministry of Culture, Sports and Tourism.

They returned to SXSW in 2014 with an unprecedented 13 other Korean bands, ranging from Jay Park and Hyuna to fellow punk band No Brain. An image of member Kim Insoo playing accordion was published on the Grammy website.

== Legal dispute ==
Crying Nut sued CNBLUE and its agency FNC Entertainment for unauthorized use of their song "Deathblow Offside" on Mnet's "M Countdown" in 2010. Crying Nut also charged that CNBLUE had released a DVD of the concert in Japan and profited from it. Crying Nut claimed that not only did CNBLUE use the song without permission, but also lip-synced along with the original Crying Nut recording. Crying Nut allegedly posted online that CNBLUE "must pay the penalties for intellectual property rights infringement". CNBLUE later countersued Crying Nut for allegedly accusing CNBLUE of copyright infringement, filing an injunction against Crying Nut's online criticisms, claiming that the intellectual property theft was the responsibility of CJ E&M and the unspecified company responsible for the DVD sales, and that Crying Nut's allegations may have permanently damaged CNBLUE's reputation as Hallyu stars. But the Court rejected CNBLUE's assertion.

== Band members ==
- Park Yoon-Sik (박윤식) - lead vocals, guitars
- Lee Sang-Myun (이상면) - guitars
- Lee Sang-Hyuk (이상혁) - drums
- Han Kyung-Rock (한경록) also known as captain rock(캡틴락) - bass
- Kim In-Soo (김인수) - keyboards, accordion

== Discography ==
=== Studio albums ===
| Title | Album details | Peak chart positions | | Sales |
| Title | Album details | KOR MIAK (Note: The Music Industry Association of Korea monthly album sales chart was published from August 1998 through September 2008.) | KOR Gaon (Note: The Gaon Chart was first published in 2010.) | Sales |
|---|---|---|---|---|
| Speed Up Losers (말달리자) | Released: June 1998; Label: Drug Records; Format: CD, cassette | 40 | — | KOR: 100,000 |
| Circus Magic Clowns (서커스 매직 유랑단) | Released: November 5, 1999; Label: Drug Records; Format: CD, cassette | 47 | — | KOR: 30,263 |
| Poor Hand Love Song (하수연가) | Released: June 1, 2001; Label: Drug Records; Format: CD, cassette | 17 | — | KOR: 67,659 |
| The Secondhand Radio (고물라디오) | Released: December 5, 2002; Label: Drug Records; Format: CD | — | — | |
| Milk Cattle at the OK Corral (OK 목장의 젖소) | Released: July 14, 2006; Label: Drug Records; Format: CD | 22 | — | KOR: 7,925 |
| Uncomfortable Party (불편한 파티) | Released: August 10, 2009; Label: Drug Records; Format: CD, digital download | — | — | |
| Flaming Nuts | Released: June 7, 2013; Label: Drug Records; Format: CD, digital download | — | 32 | |
| Remodeling (리모델링) | Released: October 10, 2018; Label: Drug Records; Format: CD, digital download | — | — | |

=== Live albums ===
| Title | Album details | Peak chart positions | Sales |
| Title | Album details | KOR MIAK | Sales |
|---|---|---|---|
| Crying Nut Best Wild Wild Live | Released: June 5, 2003; Label: Drug Records; Format: CD, DVD | 42 | KOR: 4,747 |
| 15th Anniversary Concert (15주년 기념콘서트) | Released: November 26, 2010; Label: Drug Records; Format: DVD | — | |

=== Compilation albums ===
- Crying Nut 25th Anniversary Best Album (크라잉넛 25주년 베스트앨범), released August 24, 2020 by Drug Records

=== Split albums ===
- Our Nation Vol.1, split with Yellow Kitchen, released December 1, 1996 by KM Culture

=== Extended plays ===
- Naughty Boy (개구쟁이), split with Galaxy Express, released October 18, 2011 by Drug Records
- Victory Korea Again (다시 한번 필승 코리아), released June 2, 2014 by Drug Records
- 96, split with No Brain, released September 15, 2014 by Drug Records and Roxta Muzik & Live

=== Singles ===
| Title | Year | Album |
|---|---|---|
| "We Wish You a Merry Christmas" | 2006 | Non-album singles |
| "Bye-Bye Whale" (안녕 고래) | 2007 | Non-album singles |
| "Bye-Bye" (안녕) | 2015 | Non-album singles |
| "Here We Stand" (우린 여기에) (with P-Type) | 2016 | Non-album singles |
| "Luckily" (운 좋게도) | 2017 | Remodeling |
| "You Can't Stop Us" (웬만해선 우리를 막을 수 없다) | 2018 | Non-album singles |
| "Let's Do Better Next Time" (다음에 잘하자) | 2019 | Non-album singles |
| "Deep in the Night" (밤이 깊었네) (25th Anniversary ver.) | 2020 | Crying Nut 25th Anniversary Best Album |
| "Isn't That Good?" (좋지 아니한가) (25th Anniversary ver.) | 2020 | Crying Nut 25th Anniversary Best Album |
| "Let's Get It Out" (꺼내 보는 세상) (with Raon) | 2021 | Change Up |
| "Night Overtime" (야근) | 2023 | Non-album single |

=== Soundtrack appearances ===
| Title | Year | Album |
|---|---|---|
| "Do The Right Thing" (똑바로 살아라) | 2000 | Just Do It OST |
| "Sorry" (미안해) | 2000 | Just Do It OST |
| "Vicious Song" (지독한 노래) | 2001 | Kick the Moon OST |
| "Over The Rainbow" | 2006 | Rainbow Romance OST |
| "Isn't That Good?" (좋지 아니한가) | 2007 | Shim's Family OST |
| "Funky Dance" | 2007 | Hello! Miss OST |
| "Clean with Passion for Now" (일단 뜨겁게 청소하라) | 2018 | Clean with Passion for Now OST |
| "The Paradise" (인생낙원) | 2022 | Recruit OST |
| "The Hero" (히어로) | 2023 | The First Responders 2 OST |

=== Other contributions ===
| Title | Year | Album | Notes |
|---|---|---|---|
| "Everything and Nothing" | 1997 | Smells Like Nirvana | Nirvana tribute album |
| "Hwangyaui Mubeopja" (황야의 무법자) | 1999 | Joseon Punk | |
| "Jeongyeore Bultaneun Taeyanggwa Hatbadi" (정열에 불타는 태양과 핫바디) | 1999 | Joseon Punk | |
| "All Die" (다죽자) | 1999 | Joseon Punk | Also appears on Circus Magic Clowns |
| "Oh Victory Korea" (오 필승 코리아) | 2002 | Dreams Come True | Red Devils support album |
| "Song of the Korean Independence Army" (독립군가) | 2005 | 60 Years of Liberation - Songs Sung Again | |
| "The Hero" | 2006 | The Hero | Korean album for 2006 FIFA World Cup |
| "Offside" (필살) | 2006 | I Love Football - The World Famous Football Song Collection | |
| "My Way" (Korean ver.) | 2008 | No Future For You | Sex Pistols tribute album |
| "Dream, Let's Become One" (꿈이여 하나가 되자) | 2009 | 2009 Professional Baseball Cheer Song (Heroes) | Nexen Heroes support album |
| "Hero's Journey" (영웅출정가) | 2009 | 2009 Professional Baseball Cheer Song (Heroes) | Nexen Heroes support album |
| "Stand Up, Korea" (일어나라 대한민국) | 2010 | The Shouts Of Reds, United Korea | Red Devils support album |
| "Already Now" (아니 벌써) | 2011 | Reborn Sanulrim | Sanulrim tribute album |
| "Train to the World" (세계로 가는 기차) | 2013 | A Tribute to Deulgukhwa, Vol. 1 | Deulgukhwa tribute album |
| "Ruailrock" (롸일락) | 2016 | Jebidabang Compilation 2016 | |
| "We Are The Winners" (우리가 승리한다) | 2021 | 2021 Kiwoom Heroes Fight Song | Kiwoon Heroes support album |
| "The Thousand-League Road" (천리길) | 2021 | Morning Dew 50th Anniversary Tribute to Kim Min-Gi, Vol. 4 | Kim Min-Gi tribute album |
| "Death Song" (사망가) (Studio Live ver.) | 2021 | Wumuji Studio Live, Vol. 1 | |

== Awards and nominations ==
| Award | Year | Category | Nominee / Work | Result | Ref. |
|---|---|---|---|---|---|
| Korean Music Awards | 2007 | Musician of the Year (Group) | Crying Nut | Nominated | |
| Korean Music Awards | 2007 | Best Rock Album | Milk Cattle at the OK Corral | Nominated | |
| Korean Music Awards | 2007 | Best Rock Song | "Luxembourg" | Nominated | |
| MAMA Awards | 2000 | Best Indie Performance | "Circus Magic" | Won | |
| MAMA Awards | 2001 | Best Indie Performance | "Deep in the Night" | Won | |
| Seoul Music Awards | 2018 | Band Award | Crying Nut | Won | |
