= Red Devils (supporters club) =

Official supporting group for the Korea Republic national football team

Chiwoo Cheonwang

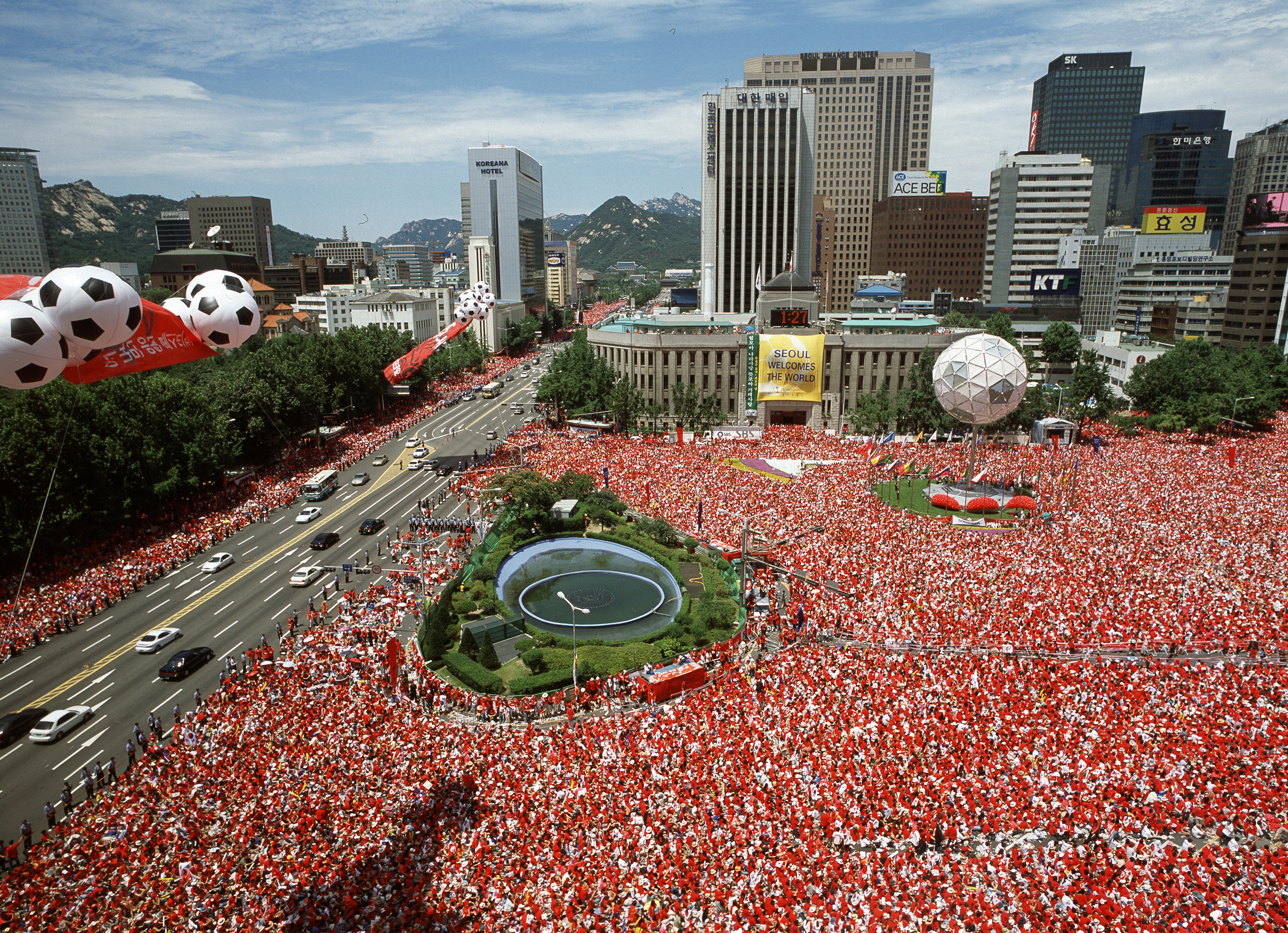
Seoul Plaza during the 2002 World Cup

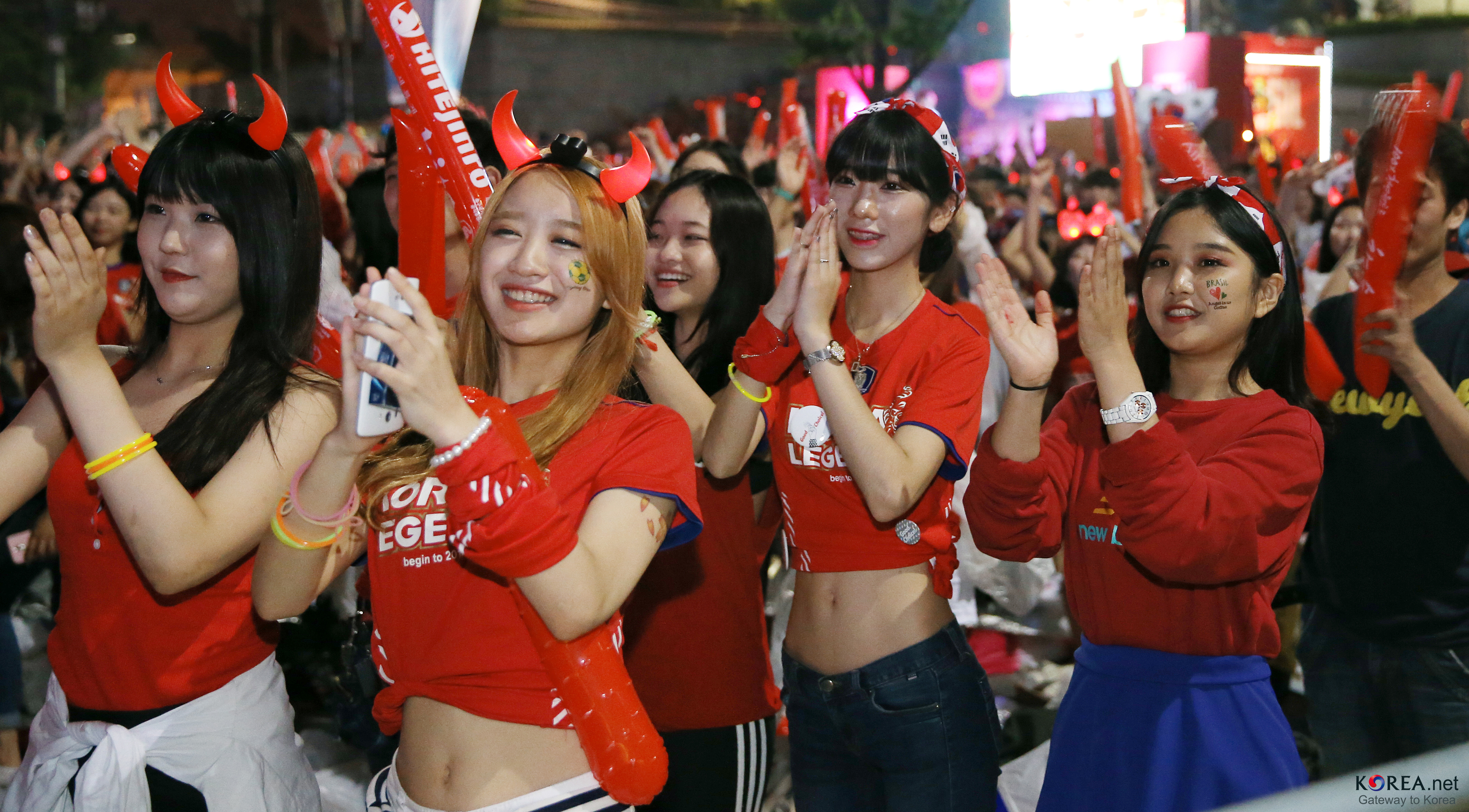
Fans cheering during the 2014 World Cup

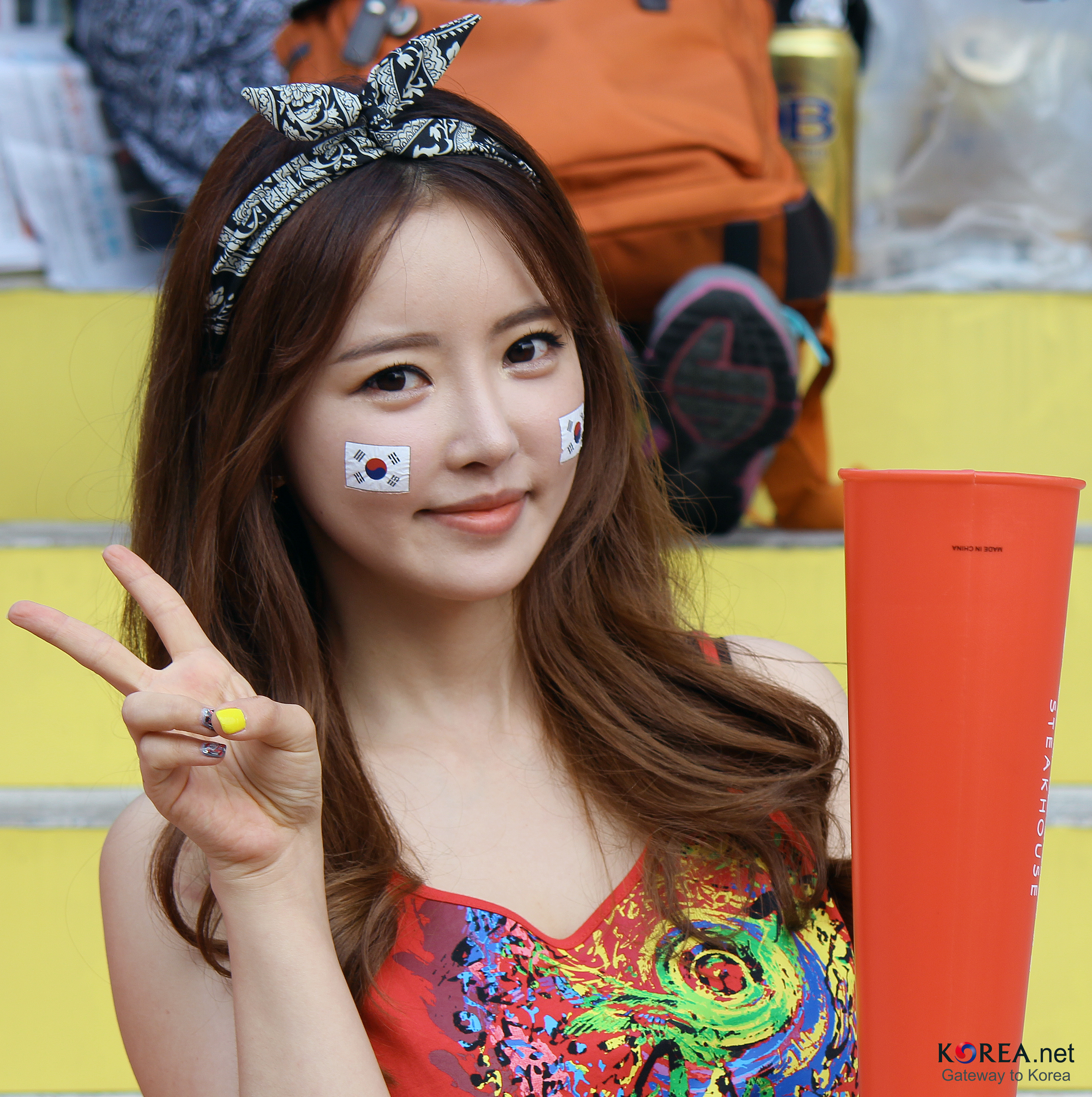
Team Korea fan

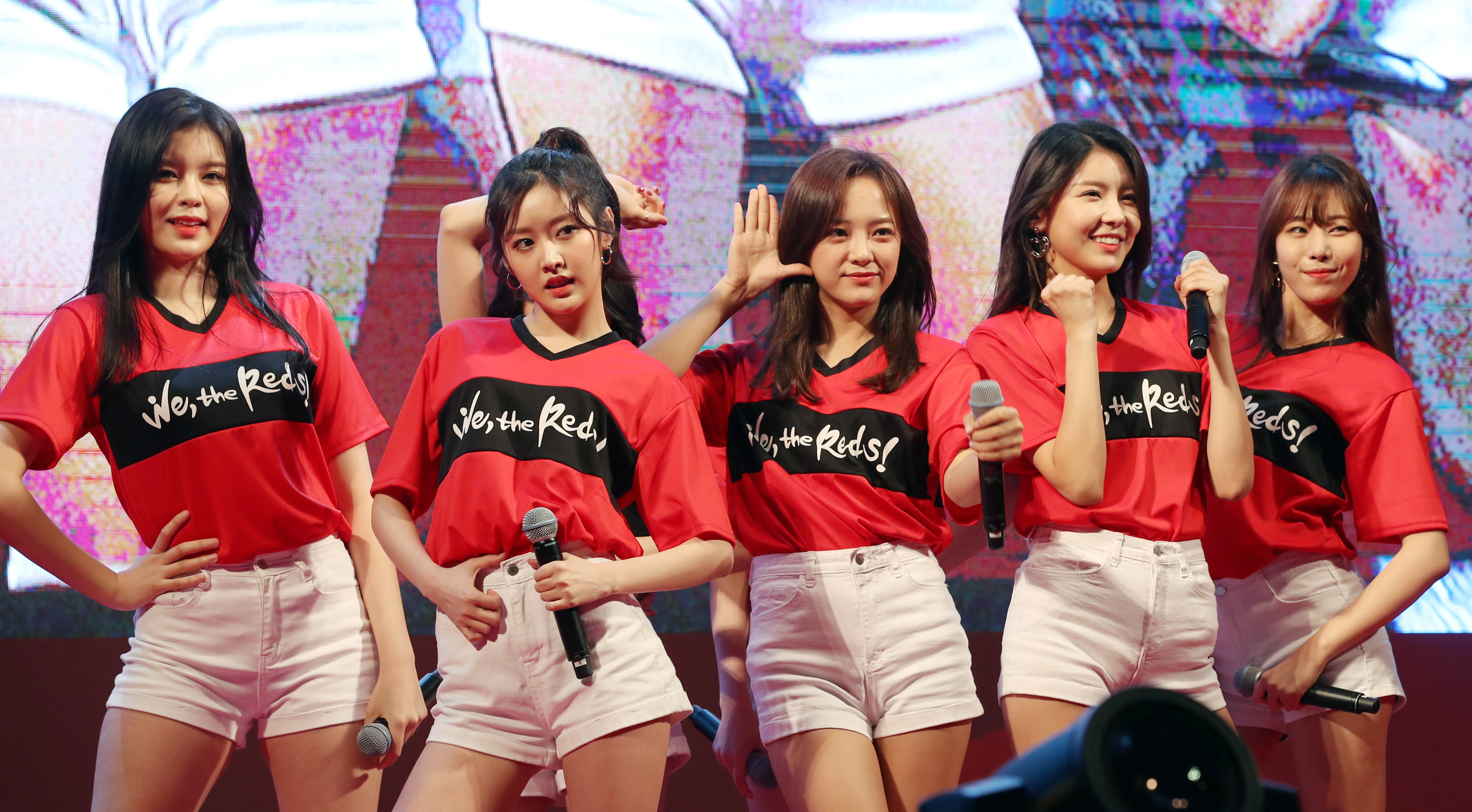
K-pop group Gugudan concert during the 2018 World Cup

Red Devils or Bulgeun Angma (Korean: 붉은 악마; Hanja: 붉은 惡魔) is the official supporting group for the Korea Republic national football team.

== Origin ==
The club was established as the "Great Hankuk Supporters Club" in December, 1995. The current name, "Red Devils", It is said to have been coined by the international media in 1983 when the Korean youth team reached the semi-final of the 1983 FIFA World Youth Championship. Because the national football team's official jersey color is red, the international media dubbed South Korea U-20 "Red Furies", and it was translated as "Red Devils" in Korean. (Although original articles containing "Red Furies" were never found until now.) The name was selected in 1997 as the official name of the organization.

== Mascot ==
The mascot for the Red Devils is Chiu Cheonwang (치우천왕; 蚩尤天王). A legendary figure in ancient Chinese and Korean history, the stories of brave Chiwoo Cheonwang influenced Korean folk tales and was interpreted into various designs of dokkaebi, which would be used in decorations for royal tombs and roof tiles. As Chiwoo Cheonwang is known as a symbol for victory and a guardian figure, the dokkaebi-like trademark was chosen to represent the club.

== Membership ==
Membership is open to those who wish to support the Korea Republic national football team, but anyone who wears red and supports the national team during games is considered a Red Devil. Many activities and gatherings are organized through the official homepage. Although the headquarters are situated in Seoul, there are many club centers throughout the country where one can attend. the Red Devils organized an effort to clean up the litter and involved citizens to participate in the cleaning process. They showed that they were model citizens by keeping things clean at the stadiums and streets.

== Cheering ==
The main activity for the Red Devils is supporting the national football team, i.e. cheering. The cheering of the Red Devils is noted for being highly organized and extremely passionate, so much so that they are called "the 12th member" of the football team.

The most common cheer is in a cadence of shouting and clapping: "대~한민국! (大~韓民國, Dae~han Minguk, Republic of Korea)" followed by five claps (clap-clap—clap-clap—clap--, the second and the fourth being half notes). The clapping is usually accompanied by percussion instruments like the Korean drum buk or thundersticks to keep the beat. Supporters also cheer by singing the famous Korean folk song, Arirang, and various songs made for the World Cup.

Cheering is done in stadiums, theaters and also many public plazas and squares in front of jumbo screens. On homeground, the Red Devils usually sit behind the goal at the northside of the stadium. Enthusiastic members make groups in order to attend homeaway games in foreign countries as well. FIFA Fan Fest was influenced by this Korean-style street cheering.

Supporters wear red, like the national football team players. Devil horns and other adornments are popular as well.

== Be the Reds! ==
"Be the Reds!" was a phrase popularized on T-shirts during the 2002 FIFA World Cup by supporters of the Red Devils. The team's jersey color is red, and its supporters have similar nomenclature as supporters of the Premier League's Manchester United. While the true intentions of the creator of the phrase are unknown, many believe it to be a literal translation of a phrase in Korean, thus the practical translation should read "We are Red" or "Be Red". Since then, it has become a national symbol of South Korea at football.

=== Origin ===
The first incarnation of the T-Shirt featured a white brush stroked silk screened logo on a red T-shirt. The logo also appeared on hats, bandanas, socks, wristbands, backpacks, shoes, napkins, underwear, and probably other things as well. This was possible because the original logo was purposely not copyrighted or trademarked, to ensure widespread distribution of "Be the Reds!" items for supporters of the Korean soccer team everywhere. Originally, the alphabet "R" in the logo was designed to represent the number "12", meaning that those who wear "Be the Reds!" shirts are the twelfth Korean players on the ground (as there are eleven players in a soccer team).

=== Controversy ===
In late 2003 someone trademarked the phrase and began selling "Be the Reds!" items commercially. In retaliation, the person who first made the logo on a T-shirt copyrighted the font in which it was written, thus forcing the owner of the phrase to print his shirts in a different font. Those shirts did not sell as well as the phrase owner had hoped. Because of those two trademarks, no further "Be the Reds!" items (in the original font) have been made legally since 2003. The Korean Football Association has since abandoned the slogan, opting for their own trademarked one, "Reds Go Together!" for the 2006 World Cup. In 2010, there are competing slogans, KFA's All the Reds! and Red Devils' "The Shouts of Reds! United Korea!"

=== Other uses ===
The original London internet café Cyberia was bought by Koreans and rebranded as "Be The Reds" in the early 2000s.

In late 2002, Korean soccer star Ahn Jung-Hwan made his Japan debut (in the J-League) playing for the Shimizu S-Pulse. As their colors were white and orange, one group of entrepreneurs created "Be the Orange!" T-shirts written in the same font. Few were bought, and the adapted slogan never caught on.

Some fans of the J-League's Urawa Reds have also been seen wearing "Be the Reds!" memorabilia, as it calls out their team by both color and name.

While it never caught on as a widespread fad, a few supporters of Major League Baseball's Cincinnati Reds have also been known to sport clothing bearing the same phrase.
