= Milk Cattle at the OK Corral =

Studio album by Crying Nut
- Released: 14 July 2006
- Recorded: KOCCA Studio(Seoul Korea)
- Genre: Post-punk, indie rock, alternative rock
- Length: 57:12
- Label: Drug Records
- Producer: Crying Nut / Lee, Suk Moon

Crying Nut chronology
The Secondhand Radio (2002)	Milk Cattle at the OK Corral (2006)	Uncomfortable Party (2009)

Milk Cattle at the OK Corral (OK 목장의 젖소) is the fifth studio album of South Korean Rock Band Crying Nut. Thank to this album, Crying Nut successfully made their comeback to the mainstream and the indie scene simultaneously. "Luxembourg" and "Myeong-dong Calling" were hits. "Whisper under the Water" features (Sim Soo-bong), who was present during the former President Park Jung-Hee's assassination. Lee Sang-Myun's wife, the song's writer, wrote the song for her husband as a present.

== Track listing ==
All tracks are written by Crying Nut except "Whisper Under the Water" (Whiru) Actual composers listed below.

No.	Title	Writer(s)	Length
1.	"Milk Cattle at the OK Corral"	Han, kyung-Rok/Lee, Sang-Myun	1:37
2.	"Luxembourg"	Han, kyung-Rok	2:26
3.	"Smash It"	Han, kyung-Rok	2:36
4.	"Myeong-dong Calling"	Han, kyung-Rok	3:48
5.	"Let’s Drink"	Lee, Sang-Hyuk	2:48
6.	"A Night at the Amusement Park"	Han, kyung-Rok	4:29
7.	"Burning Goodbye"	Lee, Sang-Myun	3:43
8.	"Whisper Under the Water (feat. 심수봉 Sim Soobong)"	Whiru	4:38
9.	"Diary of the Jobless"	Han, kyung-Rok	3:02
10.	"Bird"	Han, kyung-Rok	4:05
11.	"My World"	Kim, In-Soo	2:26
12.	"Sooni Heading to the Cosmos"	Lee, Sang-Hyuk	4:18
13.	"Bed-Wetting Generation"	Han, kyung-Rok	3:36
14.	"Daydream"	Lee, Sang-Myun	3:32
15.	"Meditation from Prison"	Lee, Sang-Myun	3:00
16.	"The Adventures of the Strong"	Lee, Sang-Hyuk	5:38
17.	"Hidden Track"		1:30
Total length:			57:12

== Personnel ==
- Park, Yoon-Sik – vocal, guitar
- Lee, Sang-Myun – guitar
- Han, kyung-Rok – bass
- Lee, Sang-Hyuk – drums
- Kim, In-Soo – Accordion, Organ
