= Speed Up Losers =

Studio album by Crying Nut
- Released: June 1998
- Recorded: Music KKA-E Studio, Seoul Korea
- Genre: Punk rock, indie rock, alternative rock
- Length: 49:07
- Label: DMR
- Producer: Lee, Suk Moon

Crying Nut chronology
| Our Nation Vol.1 (1996) | Speed Up Losers (1998) | Circus Magic Clowns (1999) |

Speed Up Losers (말달리자) is the official debut studio album by Korean rock band Crying Nut. The title track became a hit single. This album sold over 100,000 copies despite being released by an indie label. Due in part to this album, Crying Nut is credited for introducing punk rock to the Korean public.

== Track listing ==
All tracks are written by Crying Nut, except "Epitaph" (Lee, Sang-Myun /Lee, Sung Woo) Actual composers listed below

| No. | Title | Writer(s) | Length |
|---|---|---|---|
| 1. | "Epitaph" | Lee, Sang-Myun /Lee, Sung Woo | 2:10 |
| 2. | "Seagull" | Lee, Sang-Hyuk | 3:37 |
| 3. | "Speed Up Losers" | Lee, Sang-Hyuk | 3:06 |
| 4. | "Contact" | Lee, Sang-Hyuk / Crying Nut | 3:45 |
| 5. | "Blue Bird" | Han, kyung-Rock | 3:42 |
| 6. | "Black Bird" | Lee, Sang-Hyuk / Crying Nut | 5:29 |
| 7. | "Punk Girl" | Lee, Sang-Myun / Lee, Sang-Hyuk | 2:52 |
| 8. | "The Money That Rocks the Cradle" | Lee, Sang-Myun | 3:09 |
| 9. | "Chrysalises" | Lee, Sang-Hyuk /Lee, Sang-Myun | 6:07 |
| 10. | "So Not Funny" | Park, Yoon-Sick | 3:11 |
| 11. | "Matchstick Girl" | Lee, Sang-Myun / Lee, Sang-Myun & Lee, Sang-Hyuk | 3:35 |
| 12. | "Hurricane" | Lee, Sang-Hyuk | 3:17 |
| 13. | "Tough Guy" | Lee, Sang-Myun | 5:37 |
| Total length: | | | 49:07 |

== Personnel ==
- Park, Yoon-Sick – vocal, guitar
- Lee, Sang-Myun – guitar, vocal
- Han, kyung-Rock – bass, vocal
- Lee, Sang-Hyuk – drums
