= Lee Eun-mi (singer) =

South Korean singer

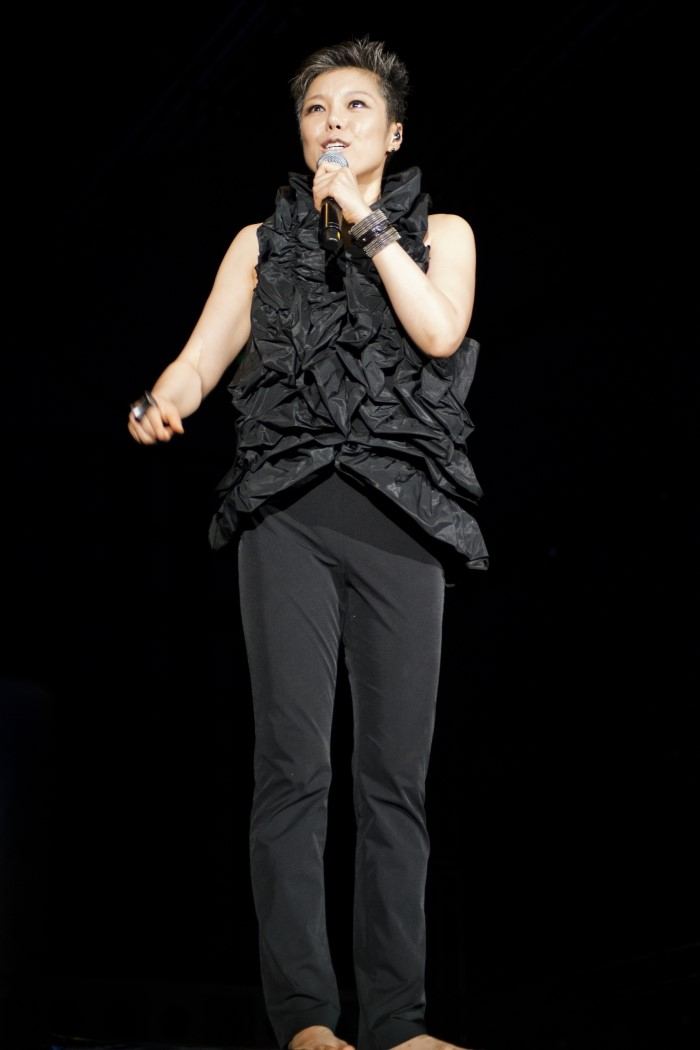
- Lee in 2012

Background information
- Also known as: Lee Eun-mee
- Born: May 19, 1966 (age 60); South Korea
- Genre: Rock
- Occupations: Singer
- Years active: 1989–present

Korean name
- Hangul: 이은미
- RR: I Eunmi
- MR: I Ŭnmi

Lee Eun-mi (Korean: 이은미; born May 19, 1966) is a South Korean singer. She is well known for her song "I Have a Lover", which became very popular in South Korea.

== Music career ==
She debuted in 1989 and became known for the song that launched her career "I Have a Lover", and others, like "In the Middle of Breaking Up", "Into the Memories" and "Nocturn".

She said that she was influenced by The Carpenters and the late South Korean singer Kim Kwang-seok.

=== The barefoot diva ===
She focused on live performances rather than on television appearances, and became known to her fans as "the barefoot diva."

=== 20th anniversary concert ===
In 2009 she performed her Lee Eun Mi – 20th Anniversary Concert in a nationwide tour of over 70 cities in South Korea, promoting her new album, "Walking Atop The Sound"; and on tour in Canada and the United States.

=== Emcee on television audition show ===
In May 2012, she started hosting the second season of MBC's audition show I Am a Singer, singing her song "Nocturne" on the first night, and receiving praise for her emcee style. Despite her relative inexperience, compared to the show's past emcees, the creative director said, "We were impressed with her style of talking that was both comforting and effortless," and convinced her to remain, after being a temporary replacement.

Her appearance on the show was said to reveal a "softer side" of the veteran singer who was known for a "strong, sometimes stubborn, stance on issues related to K-pop," and a firm opposition to lip-syncing on the air.

=== First Japanese fan meeting ===
In May 2012, at age forty-six, she held her first fan meeting, Lee Eun-mi Story in Osaka and Tokyo, Japan.

== Personal life ==
On January 12, 2011, she married her long time friend and lover, a Korean-American businessman in his mid-40s, in Santa Barbara, California, and they reside in Samseong-dong, Seoul.

== Bibliography ==
In 2007, she released a collection of photos and poems in Meeting Poems Barefooted.

In her memoir Barefoot Diva, published in February 2012, she wrote, "For a time, people called me a tiger in that I always seemed ready to criticize and fight. I think then, I believed that kind of attitude was the only way I could keep doing music the way I wanted to."

== Discography ==
=== Studio albums ===
- 자유인 (1997)
- Beyond Face (1998)
- Noblesse (2001)
- Ma Non Tanto (2005)
- Walking Atop the Sound (2009)

== Filmography ==
=== Television shows ===
Year	Title	Role	Notes	Ref.
2023	Golden Girls	Cast Member		
