= J (South Korean singer) =

South Korean-American singer

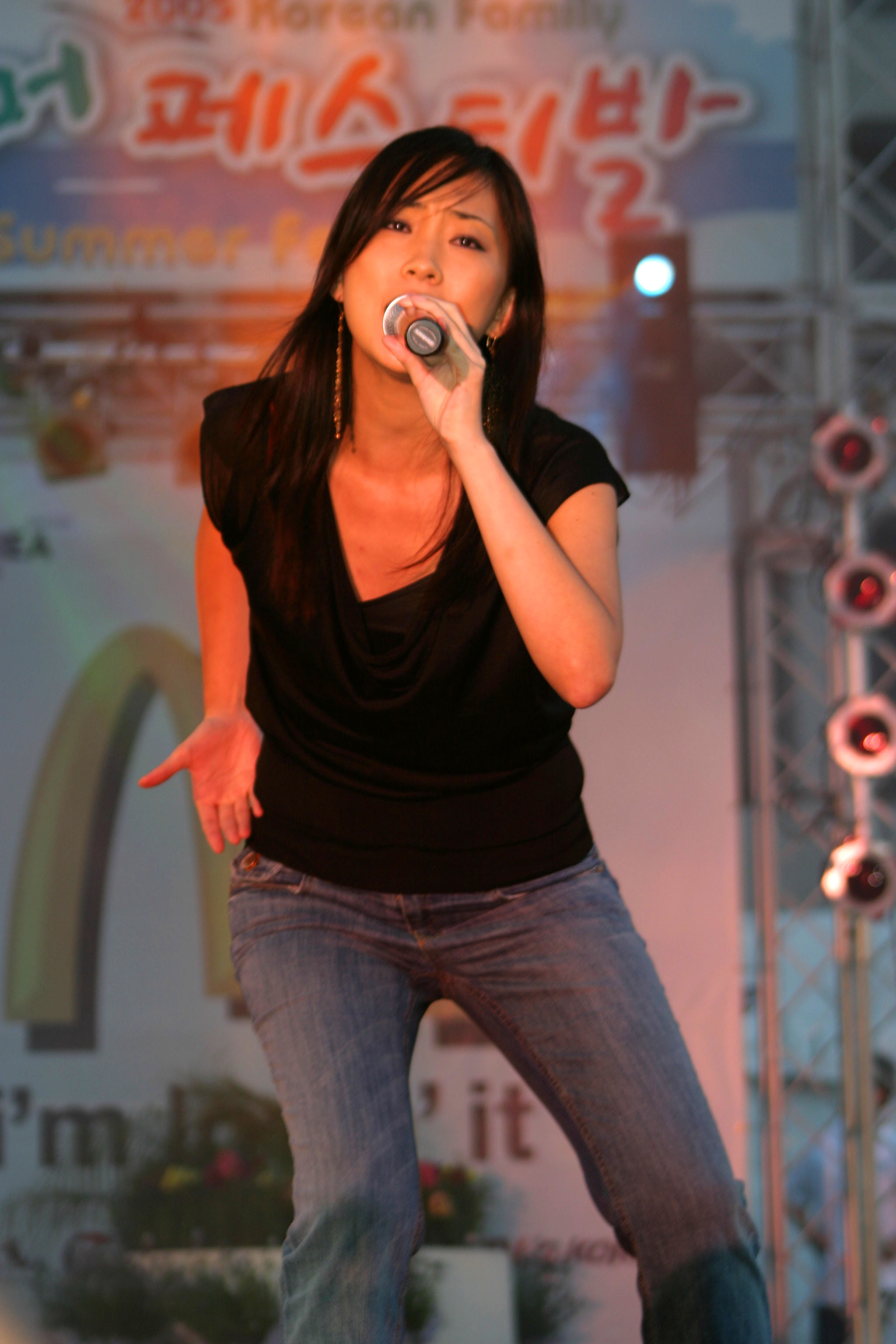
- J performing in 2005

Background information
- Also known as: J.ae
- Born: Chung Jae-young; May 2, 1977 (age 49)
- Genres: K-pop, R&B/soul
- Occupations: Singer-songwriter, television presenter
- Years active: 1998–present

Korean name
- Hangul: 정재영
- RR: Jeong Jaeyeong
- MR: Chŏng Chaeyŏng

Chung Jae-young (Korean: 정재영; born May 2, 1977), better known by the stage names J and J.ae (Korean: 제이), is a Korean-American singer based in South Korea. She debuted in 1998 with the album, J: Gold.

== Early life ==
J was born Chung Jae-young on May 2, 1977. Her father is Chung Hee-taek, the former vocalist of the rock band He Six, and her aunt is Chung Hoon-hee, a singer. When she was one year old, she immigrated to the United States with her family. She grew up in San Francisco, California, and later Springfield, Virginia, where she attended West Springfield High School. Her mother entered her into the 1995 regional Miss Korea pageant in Washington, D.C., where she finished as the first runner-up and was scouted by a music producer. She studied jazz at NOVA in Virginia, but took a leave of absence in 1997 and returned to South Korea in order to become a singer.

== Career ==
J’s debut album was prepared over the course of two years. During that period, J provided vocals for Yoo Seung-jun’s 1st and 2nd albums and contributed to the soundtrack of the movie Hallelujah. Her debut album was released in November 1998 with two versions — J-Gold and J-Blue. J-Gold was described as "pure and innocent", while J-Blue was described as "emphasizing a sensuous feel." The two versions shared 7 tracks in common, while the remaining 4 differed.

In 2002, J was invited to contribute her talent to the FIFA World Cup's official album. Her song "Gotta Get Love" was featured on The Official Album of the 2002 FIFA World Cup Korea/Japan Edition.

In 2007, she released a contemporary Christian album In My Lifetime. The album had a more R&B/hip-hop feel than her previous releases.

In 2012, J hosted Arirang TV's The Sensation, a music-focused series that introduced traditional Korean instruments, music, and dance through multiple venues including concerts, studio audience tapings, and award-winning documentaries geared towards a world-wide English-speaking audience.

== Personal life ==
On September 14, 2013, J married a U.S. soldier who was based in South Korea. Following their marriage, the couple moved to the United States. They have one daughter, born on June 28, 2016.

== Discography ==
=== Studio albums ===
Title	Album details	Peak chart positions		Sales
Title	Album details	KOR (MIAK)	KOR (Circle)	Sales
Gold	Released: November 27, 1998; Label: Seoul Records	—	—	
In Love	Released: April 20, 2000; Label: Seoul Records	7	—	KOR: 231,895
Chocolate	Released: December 1, 2000; Label: Seoul Records	—	—	
Beautiful Ones	Released: June 20, 2001; Label: Pony Canyon Korea	6	—	KOR: 107,596
Dim The Lights	Released: April 11, 2002; Label: Midas	11	—	KOR: 47,862
The Crush of Love	Released: April 23, 2004; Label: Plyzen	—	—	
In My Life	Released: January 1, 2007; Label: Rise Up Korea	—	—	
In Love Again	Released: November 8, 2007; Label: Sponge Entertainment	29	—	KOR: 2,077
Sentimental	Released: February 3, 2010; Label: CEN Entertainment	No data	—	
SuperStar	Released: July 1, 2011; Label: Pony Canyon Korea	No data	15	

=== Extended plays ===
Title	Album details
Good Day	Released: October 24, 2012; Label: EM Company

=== Singles ===
Title	Year	Peak chart positions	Album
Title	Year	KOR (Circle)	Album
"Goodbye" (굿바이)	1998	—	Gold
"Like Yesterday" (어제처럼)	2000	—	In Love
"Undivided Love"	2000	—	Chocolate
"Light" (빛)	2001	—	Beautiful Ones
"Until Then" (그때까지)	2002	—	Dim The Lights
"Sad But True" (슬프지만 진실)	2004	—	The Crush of Love
"I Told You I Love You" (사랑한다 말했잖아)	2006	—	Non-album single
"Father's Song"	2007	—	In My Life
"In Tears" (눈물로) (feat. Lee Jung)	2007	—	Non-album single
"Just Ten Days" (열흘만)	2007	—	In Love Again
"Alcohol and Pure Love" (술과 순정) (feat. Eun Ji-won and Miryo)	2008	—	In Love Again
"You Don't Even Know" (모르면서)	2008	—	Love Child (digital single)
"Toast" (with Humming Urban Stereo)	2008	—	French Toast (digital single)
"Sweet Dream"	2009	—	Romance Zero OST
"Saying I Love You" (사랑한다는 말) (with Alex)	2009	—	SuperStar
"Dream" (feat. Supreme Team)	2009	—	SuperStar
"No. 5" (feat. Eun Ji-won)	2010	44	Sentimental
"SuperStar" (feat. Jiggy Dogg)	2011	82	SuperStar
"Nightmare" (악몽)	2011	76	Non-album single
"Two of Us" (둘이서) (with Lee Jae-hoon)	2011	39	Good Day
"Good Day" (멋진 하루)	2012	—	Good Day
"Blue Sky" (feat. HavyT)	2013	—	Non-album singles
"Happy Person"	2013	—	Non-album singles
"Starry Starry Days" (별의 별) (with lapin)	2017	—	Non-album singles

== Awards and nominations ==
Award	Year	Category	Nominee	Result	Ref.
Golden Disc Awards	2000	Popularity Award	"Like Yesterday" (어제처럼)	Won	
Mnet Asian Music Awards	2000	Best R&B Performance	"Like Yesterday" (어제처럼)	Nominated	
Mnet Asian Music Awards	2001	Best Female Artist	"The Saddest Words" (가장 슬픈 말)	Nominated	
SBS Gayo Daejeon	2000	R&B Award	J	Won	
Seoul Music Awards	2000	Best New Artist	J	Won	
