= List of King of Mask Singer episodes (2021) =

South Korean variety-music show

- No. of episodes: 50

Release
- Original network: MBC
- Original release: January 3 – December 26, 2021

Season chronology
- ← Previous; 2020 Next → 2022

This is a list of episodes of the South Korean variety-music show King of Mask Singer in 2021. The show airs on MBC as part of their Sunday Night lineup. Due to the COVID-19 pandemic, the show would be recorded without any audience in the episodes, and the matches' results would be decided by the celebrity panelists. The names listed below are in performance order.

– Contestant is instantly eliminated by the live audience and judging panel
– After being eliminated, contestant performs a prepared song for the next round and takes off their mask during the instrumental break
– After being eliminated and revealing their identity, contestant has another special performance.
– Contestant advances to the next round.
– Contestant becomes the challenger.
– Mask King.

== Episodes ==
=== 144th Generation Mask King (cont.) ===
- Contestants: Elly (Weki Meki), Jeong Minseong (La Poem), Heo Chan (Victon), Outsider, Nam Hyun-hee, Shin Hyun-woo (Sohodae), Park Nam-jung, Jung Dong-nam
Episode 288

Episode 288 was broadcast on January 3, 2021.

Order	Stage Name	Real Name	Song	Original artist	Vote
Round 2
Pair 1	2021 Cheer Up, Ox!	Jeong Minseong of La Poem	Memory Loss (기억상실)	Gummy	11
Pair 1	Miracles in December	Chan of Victon	Try (노력)	Park Won	10
Pair 2	Countdown	Shin Hyun-woo of Sohodae	To You (그대에게)	Infinite Track	3
Pair 2	The Twelfth Brother	Park Nam-jung	I Loved You (사랑했어요)	Kim Hyun-sik	18
Special	Countdown	Shin Hyun-woo of Sohodae	Irreversible Love (돌이킬 수 없는 사랑)	Sohodae	—
Round 3
Finalists	2021 Cheer Up, Ox!	Jeong Minseong of La Poem	Old Song (오래된 노래)	Kim Dong-ryul	15
Finalists	The Twelfth Brother	Park Nam-jung	D.D.D (디.디.디.)	Kim Hye-rim	6
Special	Twelve Zodiac Signs	Park Nam-jung	Missing You (널 그리며), Emergency Landing of Love (사랑의 불시착), Days with Rain (비에스친 날들)	Park Nam-jung	—
Final
Battle	2021 Cheer Up, Ox!	Jung Min-sung of La Poem	Previous three songs used as voting standard		5
Battle	Buttumak Cat	Yang Yo-seob of Highlight	Forever and Ever (영원히 영원히)	Jaurim	16

=== 145th Generation Mask King ===
- Contestants: Yoo Seung-beom, Yoon Taek, Lee Jin-ho, Jae-gyun Hwang, Wuno, Yubin, Lee Young-hyun (Big Mama), Suyun (singer) (Rocket Punch)
Episodes 289 – 290

Episode 289

Episode 289 was broadcast on January 10, 2021. This marks the beginning of the Hundred-forty-fifth Generation.

Order	Stage Name	Real Name	Song	Original artist	Vote
Round 1
Pair 1	The Nature Man	Yoo Seung-beom	Once Again This Night (이 밤을 다시 한 번)	Jo Ha-moon	14
Pair 1	The City Man	Yoon Taek	Once Again This Night (이 밤을 다시 한 번)	Jo Ha-moon	7
2nd Song	The City Man	Yoon Taek	Cheap Coffee (싸구려 커피)	Chang Kiha	—
Pair 2	Won Bin	Lee Jin-ho	Memories Resemble Love (추억은 사랑을 닮아)	Park Hyo-shin	11
Pair 2	Mr. Bean	Jae-gyun Hwang	Memories Resemble Love (추억은 사랑을 닮아)	Park Hyo-shin	10
2nd Song	Mr. Bean	Jae-gyun Hwang	Around Thirty (서른 즈음에)	Kim Kwang-seok	—
Pair 3	Winter Rain	₩uNo	Phone Number (전화번호)	Jinusean	6
Pair 3	The Flower of Snow	Yubin	Phone Number (전화번호)	Jinusean	15
2nd Song	Winter Rain	₩uNo	? (Question Mark) (? (물음표))	Primary ft. Choiza ft. Zion.T	—
Pair 4	Treasure Chest	Lee Young-hyun of Big Mama	With a Heart that Should Forget (잊어야 한다는 마음으로)	Kim Kwang-seok	17
Pair 4	Jukebox	Suyun of Rocket Punch	With a Heart that Should Forget (잊어야 한다는 마음으로)	Kim Kwang-seok	4
2nd Song	Jukebox	Suyun of Rocket Punch	Playing with Fire (불장난)	Blackpink	—

Episode 290

Episode 290 was broadcast on January 17, 2021.

Order	Stage Name	Real Name	Song	Original artist	Vote
Round 2
Pair 1	The Nature Man	Yoo Seung-beom	It is Love (사랑이야)	Song Chang-sik	17
Pair 1	Won Bin	Lee Jin-ho	Don't You Know? (모르시나요)	Davichi	4
Pair 2	The Flower of Snow	Yubin	Move	Taemin	3
Pair 2	Treasure Chest	Lee Young-hyun of Big Mama	A Night Like Tonight (오늘 같은 밤이면)	Park Jeong-woon	18
Round 3
Finalists	The Nature Man	Yoo Seung-beom	Yeongil Bay's Friend (영일만 친구)	Choi Baek-ho	3
Finalists	Treasure Chest	Lee Young-hyun of Big Mama	My Way	Lee Soo	18
Special	The Nature Man	Yoo Seung-beom	Jealousy (질투)	Yoo Seung-beom	—
Final
Battle	Treasure Chest	Lee Young-hyun of Big Mama	Previous three songs used as voting standard		15
Battle	Buttumak Cat	Yang Yo-seob of Highlight	The First Snow (첫 눈)	Jung Joon-il	6

=== 146th Generation Mask King ===
- Contestants: Park Si-hwan, Go Young-yeol (Second Moon/RabidAnce), Jaejae, Lee Ae-ran, Park Seon-woo, Son Ah-seop, Yves (Loona), Kim Ki-bum
Episodes 291 – 292

Episode 291

Episode 291 was broadcast on January 24, 2021. This marks the beginning of the Hundred-forty-sixth Generation.

Order	Stage Name	Real Name	Song	Original artist	Vote
Round 1
Pair 1	Staying Home	Park Si-hwan	Stained (물들어)	BMK	17
Pair 1	Bangkok	Go Young-yeol of Second Moon/RabidAnce	Stained (물들어)	BMK	4
2nd Song	Bangkok	Go Young-yeol of Second Moon/RabidAnce	Tiger is Coming (범 내려온다)	Leenalchi	—
Pair 2	Menbosha	Jaejae	A Cheeky Man (얄미운 사람)	Kim Ji-ae	4
Pair 2	Sha Sha Sha	Lee Ae-ran	A Cheeky Man (얄미운 사람)	Kim Ji-ae	17
2nd Song	Menbosha	Jaejae	Heartbreaker	G-Dragon	—
Pair 3	Frozen	Park Seon-woo	Thorn (가시)	Buzz	20
Pair 3	DDaeng	Son Ah-seop	Thorn (가시)	Buzz	1
2nd Song	DDaeng	Son Ah-seop	One Love (하나의 사랑)	Park Sang-min	—
Pair 4	Yuja Tea	Yves of Loona	Departure from a Country (출국)	Hareem	17
Pair 4	Balocha	Kim Ki-bum	Departure from a Country (출국)	Hareem	4
2nd Song	Balocha	Kim Ki-bum	Bravo My Life	Bom Yeoreum Gaeul Kyeoul	—

Episode 292

Episode 292 was broadcast on January 31, 2021.

Order	Stage Name	Real Name	Song	Original artist	Vote
Round 2
Pair 1	Staying Home	Park Si-hwan	Invisible Love (보이지 않는 사랑)	Shin Seung-hun	16
Pair 1	Sha Sha Sha	Lee Ae-ran	Daejeon Blues (대전 부르스)	Ahn Jeong-ae	5
Special	Sha Sha Sha	Lee Ae-ran	Life of a Century (백세인생)	Lee Ae-ran	—
Pair 2	Frozen	Park Seon-woo	In the Rain (빗속에서)	Lee Moon-sae	16
Pair 2	Yuja Tea	Yves of Loona	Tomorrow (내일 할 일)	Yoon Jong-shin	5
Round 3
Finalists	Staying Home	Park Si-hwan	You to Me Again (그대 내게 다시)	Byun Jin-sub	18
Finalists	Frozen	Park Seon-woo	Addicted Love (중독된 사랑)	Jo Jang-hyuk	3
Final
Battle	Staying Home	Park Si-hwan	Previous three songs used as voting standard		12
Battle	Treasure Chest	Lee Young-hyun of Big Mama	Secret (비밀)	Boohwal	9

=== 147th Generation Mask King ===
- Contestants: Han Hee-jun, Kim Na-young, Lee Eun-gyeol, Kim Shin-eui (Monni), Kim Yong-im, Ahn Sung-joon (trot singer), Lee Joo-hyuk (singer) (Gift), Punch
Episodes 293 – 294

Episode 293

Episode 293 was broadcast on February 7, 2021. This marks the beginning of the Hundred-forty-seventh Generation.

Order	Stage Name	Real Name	Song	Original artist	Vote
Round 1
Pair 1	Brother	Han Hee-jun	It's Gonna Be Rolling	Lee So-ra	6
Pair 1	Brother's Wife	Kim Na-young	It's Gonna Be Rolling	Lee So-ra	15
2nd Song	Brother	Han Hee-jun	Hug Me (안아줘)	Jung Joon-il	—
Pair 2	Postcard	Lee Eun-gyeol	People All Change (사람들은 모두 변하나 봐)	Bom Yeoreum Gaeul Kyeoul	2
Pair 2	Yeopjeon	Kim Shin-eui of Monni	People All Change (사람들은 모두 변하나 봐)	Bom Yeoreum Gaeul Kyeoul	19
2nd Song	Postcard	Lee Eun-gyeol	Start Over (시작)	Gaho	—
Pair 3	Phrase Plate	Kim Yong-im	Where Are You (당신은 어디 있나요)	Yang Soo-kyung	13
Pair 3	Go Big or Go Home	Ahn Sung-joon	Where Are You (당신은 어디 있나요)	Yang Soo-kyung	8
2nd Song	Go Big or Go Home	Ahn Sung-joon	It's Art (예술이야)	Psy	—
Pair 4	Barcode	Lee Joo-hyuk of Gift	Going Home	Kim Yoon-ah	14
Pair 4	QR Code	Punch	Going Home	Kim Yoon-ah	7
2nd Song	QR Code	Punch	Beautiful Goodbye (사월이 지나면 우리 헤어져요)	Chen	—

Episode 294

Episode 294 was broadcast on February 14, 2021.

Order	Stage Name	Real Name	Song	Original artist	Vote
Round 2
Pair 1	Brother's Wife	Kim Na-young	Break Away	Big Mama	8
Pair 1	Yeopjeon	Kim Shin-eui of Monni	Stay	Nell	13
Pair 2	Phrase Plate	Kim Yong-im	Loveletter (여정)	Wax	6
Pair 2	Barcode	Lee Joo-hyuk of Gift	Do You Want to Walk with Me (같이 걸을까)	Lee Juck	15
Round 3
Finalists	Yeopjeon	Kim Shin-eui of Monni	After a Breakup (널 보낸 후에)	Choi Jae-hoon	10
Finalists	Barcode	Lee Joo-hyuk of Gift	I Want to Fall in Love (사랑에 빠지고 싶다)	Johan Kim	11
Final
Battle	Barcode	Lee Joo-hyuk of Gift	Previous three songs used as voting standard		19
Battle	Staying Home	Park Si-hwan	12:30 (12시 30분)	Beast	2

=== 148th Generation Mask King ===
- Contestants: Song Joon-geun, Jiseon (singer) (Loveholics), Taeil (Block B), Shinsadong Tiger, Minnie ((G)I-dle), Nadeul (singer) (Weather Forecast), New (South Korean singer) (The Boyz), Na Yoon-kwon
Episodes 295 – 296

Episode 295

Episode 295 was broadcast on February 21, 2021. This marks the beginning of the Hundred-forty-eighth Generation.

Order	Stage Name	Real Name	Song	Original artist	Vote
Round 1
Pair 1	A-type Man	Song Joon-geun	My Heart Will Be with You (너를 향한 마음)	Lee Seung-hwan	4
Pair 1	B-type Woman	Jiseon of Loveholics	My Heart Will Be with You (너를 향한 마음)	Lee Seung-hwan	17
2nd Song	A-type Man	Song Joon-geun	Applause (갈채)	Choi Yong-joon	—
Pair 2	Penthouse	Taeil of Block B	Fiction	Beast	17
Pair 2	Vinyl House	Shinsadong Tiger	Fiction	Beast	4
2nd Song	Vinyl House	Shinsadong Tiger	Goodbye for a Moment (잠시만 안녕)	MC the Max	—
Pair 3	Blood Cockles	Minnie of (G)I-dle	Snow (눈)	Zion.T	15
Pair 3	Clam Manila	Nadeul of Weather Forecast	Snow (눈)	Zion.T	6
2nd Song	Clam Manila	Nadeul of Weather Forecast	Oh! What a Shiny Night (밤이 깊었네)	Crying Nut	—
Special	Clam Manila	Nadeul of Weather Forecast	I Like You (좋아 좋아)	Weather Forecast	—
Pair 4	Snowman	New of The Boyz	Doll (인형)	Lee Ji-hoon	6
Pair 4	Snowflake	Na Yoon-kwon	Doll (인형)	Lee Ji-hoon	15
2nd Song	Snowman	New of The Boyz	Eraser (지우개)	Ali	—

Episode 296

Episode 296 was broadcast on February 28, 2021.

Order	Stage Name	Real Name	Song	Original artist	Vote
Round 2
Pair 1	B-type Woman	Jiseon of Loveholics	If (만약에)	Taeyeon	9
Pair 1	Penthouse	Taeil of Block B	Hui Jae (희재)	Sung Si-kyung	12
Special	B-type Woman	Jiseon of Loveholics	Doll's Dream (인형의 꿈) & Loveholic	Loveholics	—
Pair 2	Blood Cockles	Minnie of (G)I-dle	D (Half Moon)	Dean	5
Pair 2	Snowflake	Na Yoon-kwon	The Fool (이 바보야)	Jung Seung-hwan	16
Round 3
Finalists	Penthouse	Taeil of Block B	Flower Way (꽃길)	Kim Se-jeong	3
Finalists	Snowflake	Na Yoon-kwon	Alone in Love (혼자만의 사랑)	Kim Gun-mo	18
Final
Battle	Snowflake	Na Yoon-kwon	Previous three songs used as voting standard		10
Battle	Barcode	Lee Joo-hyuk of Gift	Things We Took for Granted (당연한 것들)	Lee Juck	11

=== 149th Generation Mask King ===
- Contestants: Kim Chae-won (Iz*One), Kwon Jin-ah, Kim Boa (Keembo) (Keembo (group)), Kim Bo-kyung, Park Sang-min, Lee Man-ki, Choi Jung-yoon, Kim Jun-ho
Episodes 297 – 298

Episode 297

Episode 297 was broadcast on March 7, 2021. This marks the beginning of the Hundred-forty-ninth Generation.

Order	Stage Name	Real Name	Song	Original artist	Vote
Round 1
Pair 1	Formosan Deer	Kim Chae-won of Iz*One	No.1	BoA	8
Pair 1	Ribeye Steak	Kwon Jin-ah	No.1	BoA	13
2nd Song	Formosan Deer	Kim Chae-won of Iz*One	I'm Not Alone (혼자가 아닌 나)	Seo Young-eun	—
Pair 2	Mugwort	Kim Boa of Keembo	Don't Touch Me	Refund Sisters	11
Pair 2	Garlic	Kim Bo-kyung	Don't Touch Me	Refund Sisters	10
2nd Song	Garlic	Kim Bo-kyung	A Flying Butterfly (나는 나비)	YB	—
Pair 3	Concert	Park Sang-min	I'm Yours (애모)	Kim Soo-hee	16
Pair 3	An Alpine Club	Lee Man-gi	I'm Yours (애모)	Kim Soo-hee	5
2nd Song	An Alpine Club	Lee Man-gi	My Heart Aches (가슴 아프게)	Nam Jin	—
Pair 4	Love is Coming Back	Choi Jung-yoon	An Essay of Memory (기억의 습작)	Exhibition	9
Pair 4	Do I Look Like a King?	Kim Jun-ho	An Essay of Memory (기억의 습작)	Exhibition	12
2nd Song	Love is Returning	Choi Jung-yoon	Aloha (아로하)	Cool	—

Episode 298

Episode 298 was broadcast on March 14, 2021.

Order	Stage Name	Real Name	Song	Original artist	Vote
Round 2
Pair 1	Ribeye Steak	Kwon Jin-ah	As Time Goes By (시간이 흐른 뒤)	T	7
Pair 1	Mugwort	Kim Boa of Keembo	Nunu Nana (눈누난나)	Jessi	14
Pair 2	Concert	Park Sang-min	Incurable Disease (난치병)	Hareem	15
Pair 2	Do I Look Like a King?	Kim Jun-ho	After the Love Has Gone (사랑한 후에)	Jeon In-kwon	6
Round 3
Finalists	Mugwort	Kim Boa of Keembo	Sorry (미안해요)	Kim Gun-mo	13
Finalists	Concert	Park Sang-min	Lifetime (일생을)	Kim Hyun-chul	8
Final
Battle	Mugwort	Kim Boa of Keembo	Previous three songs used as voting standard		5
Battle	Barcode	Lee Joo-hyuk of Gift	Ice Fortress (얼음요새)	Dear Cloud	16

=== 150th Generation Mask King ===
- Contestants: Woo Soon-sil, Do Sang-woo, Jeong Sun-ah, DJ Tukutz (Epik High), Yoo Ji-na, Jeon Tae-poong, Hong Young-joo, Kim Hyun-jung
Episodes 299 – 300

Episode 299

Episode 299 was broadcast on March 21, 2021. This marks the beginning of the Hundred-fiftieth Generation.

Order	Stage Name	Real Name	Song	Original artist	Vote
Round 1
Pair 1	Yellow	Woo Soon-sil	I'm Happy (난 행복해)	Lee So-ra	17
Pair 1	Grey	Do Sang-woo	I'm Happy (난 행복해)	Lee So-ra	4
2nd Song	Grey	Do Sang-woo	It's Not Love If It Hurts Too Much (너무 아픈 사랑은 사랑이 아니었음을)	Kim Kwang-seok	—
Pair 2	Baby Goat	Jeong Sun-ah	Never Ending Story	Boohwal	18
Pair 2	Baby Bear	DJ Tukutz of Epik High	Never Ending Story	Boohwal	3
2nd Song	Baby Bear	DJ Tukutz of Epik High	An Ordinary Day (보통날)	g.o.d	—
Pair 3	Good Day	Yoo Ji-na	Train Heading for South (남행열차)	Kim Soo-hee	16
Pair 3	Oh, My!	Jeon Tae-poong	Train Heading for South (남행열차)	Kim Soo-hee	5
2nd Song	Oh, My!	Jeon Tae-poong	To the Fool ... From the Fool (바보에게... 바보가)	Park Myung-soo	—
Pair 4	100 Days of Meeting	Hong Young-joo	Romantic Cat (낭만고양이)	Cherry Filter	5
Pair 4	The First Day from Today	Kim Hyun-jung	Romantic Cat (낭만고양이)	Cherry Filter	16
2nd Song	100 Days of Meeting	Hong Young-joo	Like an Indian Doll (인디언 인형처럼)	Na-mi	—

Episode 300

Episode 300 was broadcast on March 28, 2021.

Order	Stage Name	Real Name	Song	Original artist	Vote
Round 2
Pair 1	Yellow	Woo Soon-sil	Facing the Desolate Love (사랑 그 쓸쓸함에 대하여)	Yang Hee-eun	10
Pair 1	Baby Goat	Jeong Sun-ah	Heaven	Kim Hyun-sung	11
Special	Yellow	Woo Soon-sil	The Lost Umbrella (잃어버린 우산)	Woo Soon-sil	—
Pair 2	Good Day	Yoo Ji-na	First Express (첫차)	Seoul Sisters	7
Pair 2	The First Day from Today	Kim Hyun-jung	People Who Make Me Sad (나를 슬프게 하는 사람들)	Kim Kyung-ho	14
Round 3
Finalists	Baby Goat	Jeong Sun-ah	Memory of the Wind (바람기억)	Naul	16
Finalists	Day 1 from Today	Kim Hyun-jung	I Have a Lover (애인 있어요)	Lee Eun-mi	5
Special	The First Day from Today	Kim Hyun-jung	Breakup with Her (그녀와의 이별) & Bruise (멍)	Kim Hyun-jung	—
Final
Battle	Baby Goat	Jeong Sun-ah	Previous three songs used as voting standard		14
Battle	Barcode	Lee Joo-hyuk of Gift	Happy Together	Park Hyo-shin	7

=== 151st Generation Mask King ===
- Contestants: Han Sang-il (Noise), Juvie Train (Buga Kingz), Go Yoo-jin (Flower), Do Kyung-wan, Lee Eun-ji, Kim Hae-joon, Park Seon-joo, Lee Seung-yeon
Episodes 301 – 302

Episode 301

Episode 301 was broadcast on April 4, 2021. This marks the beginning of the Hundred-fifty-first Generation.

Order	Stage Name	Real Name	Song	Original artist	Vote
Opening	Music Captain of Our Local	Ha Hyun-woo of Guckkasten	Lazenca, Save Us	N.EX.T	—
Round 1
Pair 1	A Musical Representative	Han Sang-il of Noise	One More Step (한 걸음 더)	Yoon Sang	5
Pair 1	A Music Register	Juvie Train of Buga Kingz	One More Step (한 걸음 더)	Yoon Sang	16
2nd Song	A Musical Representative	Han Sang-il of Noise	It's Been a Long Time (한동안 뜸했었지)	Love and Peace	—
Special	A Musical Representative	Han Sang-il of Noise	What I Wanted from You (너에게 원한건)	Noise	—
Pair 2	Yoon Sang	Go Yoo-jin of Flower	Beautiful Restriction (아름다운 구속)	Kim Jong-seo	19
Pair 2	Yoo Young-seok	Do Kyung-wan	Beautiful Restriction (아름다운 구속)	Kim Jong-seo	2
2nd Song	Yoo Young-seok	Do Kyung-wan	Every Moment of You (너의 모든 순간)	Sung Si-kyung	—
Pair 3	Mask Pack	Lee Eun-ji	Love Day	Yang Yo-seob and Jung Eun-ji	17
Pair 3	Six Pack	Kim Hae-joon	Love Day	Yang Yo-seob and Jung Eun-ji	4
2nd Song	Six Pack	Kim Hae-joon	Should I Say I Love You Again? (다시 사랑한다 말할까)	Kim Dong-ryul	—
Pair 4	Ugly 6-years-old	Park Seon-joo	Sad Fate (슬픈인연)	Na-mi	19
Pair 4	Life Starts at 60	Lee Seung-yeon	Sad Fate (슬픈인연)	Na-mi	2
2nd Song	Life Starts at 60	Lee Seung-yeon	When Love Passes (사랑이 지나가면)	Lee Moon-sae	—

Episode 302

Episode 302 was broadcast on April 11, 2021.

Order	Stage Name	Real Name	Song	Original artist	Vote
Round 2
Pair 1	A Music Register	Juvie Train of Buga Kingz	Forgive Me (나를 용서해)	Keep Six	5
Pair 1	Yoon Sang	Go Yoo-jin of Flower	Making a New Ending for This Story (이 소설의 끝을 다시 써보려 해)	Han Dong-geun	16
Pair 2	Mask Pack	Lee Eun-ji	I'm Feeling Good Day (예감 좋은 날)	Rumble Fish	1
Pair 2	Ugly 6-years-old	Park Seon-joo	Wind is Blowing (바람이 분다)	Lee So-ra	20
Round 3
Finalists	Yoon Sang	Go Yoo-jin of Flower	To Her Love (그녀의 연인에게)	K2	8
Finalists	Ugly 6-years-old	Park Seon-joo	Don't Leave by My Side (내 곁에서 떠나가지 말아요)	The Light and Salt	13
Special	Yoon Sang	Go Yoo-jin of Flower	Endless	Flower	—
Final
Battle	Ugly 6-years-old	Park Seon-joo	Previous three songs used as voting standard		9
Battle	Baby Goat	Jeong Sun-ah	A World We'll Make (세상은)	Shin Hyo-beom	12

=== 152nd Generation Mask King ===
- Contestants: Syuka, Song Bong-joo (Jatanpung), Lee Jeong-kwon, Park Sung-joon (A.R.T), Woo Yeon-yi, Kim Jong-seok, Noh Hee-ji, Lee Joo-woo
Episodes 303 – 304

Episode 303

Episode 303 was broadcast on April 18, 2021. This marks the beginning of the Hundred-fifty-second Generation.

Order	Stage Name	Real Name	Song	Original artist	Vote
Round 1
Pair 1	Financial Technology	Syuka	We Need our Love (우리의 사랑이 필요한거죠)	Byun Jin-sub	2
Pair 1	At-Home Job	Song Bong-joo of Jatanpung	We Need our Love (우리의 사랑이 필요한거죠)	Byun Jin-sub	19
2nd Song	Financial Technology	Syuka	Under the Sky (하늘 아래서)	Kim Min-jong	—
Pair 2	Pizza & Beer	Lee Jeong-kwon	Dream (꿈)	Cho Yong-pil	17
Pair 2	Soju & Samgyeopsal	Park Sung-joon of A.R.T	Dream (꿈)	Cho Yong-pil	4
2nd Song	Soju & Samgyeopsal	Park Sung-joon of A.R.T	Hometown Station (고향역)	Na Hoon-a	—
Pair 3	First Love	Woo Yeon-yi	Desert Island (무인도)	Kim Choo-ja	18
Pair 3	Last Love	Kim Jong-seok	Desert Island (무인도)	Kim Choo-ja	3
2nd Song	Last Love	Kim Jong-seok	Hands of a Clock (시계바늘)	Shin Yoo	—
Pair 4	Cook	Noh Hee-ji	Star (별)	Youme	4
Pair 4	Dark History	Lee Joo-woo	Star (별)	Youme	17
2nd Song	Cook	No Hee-ji	Flying Girl (비행소녀)	Magolpy	—

Episode 304

Episode 304 was broadcast on April 25, 2021.

Order	Stage Name	Real Name	Song	Original artist	Vote
Round 2
Pair 1	At-Home Job	Song Bong-joo of Jatanpung	Those Days (그날들)	Kim Kwang-seok	10
Pair 1	Pizza & Beer	Lee Jeong-kwon	I Hate You (미워요)	Choi Jung-in	11
Special	At-Home Job	Song Bong-joo of Jatanpung	You're to Me And I'm to You (The Classic OST) (너에게 난, 나에게 넌)	Jatanpung	—
Pair 2	First Love	Woo Yeon-yi	Unready Farewell (준비 없는 이별)	Green Area	17
Pair 2	Dark History	Lee Joo-woo	Goodbye (잘가요)	Jung Jae-wook	4
Round 3
Finalists	Pizza & Beer	Lee Jeong-kwon	From Mark	Ha Dong-kyun	16
Finalists	First Love	Woo Yeon-yi	I Won't Love (사랑 안 해)	Baek Ji-young	5
Special	First Love	Woo Yeon-yi	Coincidence (우연히)	Woo Yeon-yi	—
Final
Battle	Pizza & Beer	Lee Jeong-kwon	Previous three songs used as voting standard		8
Battle	Baby Goat	Jeong Sun-ah	Rollin' (롤린)	Brave Girls	13
Special	Pizza & Beer	Lee Jeong-kwon	Like Those Powerful Salmons That Come Against the River (거꾸로 강을 거슬러 오르는저 힘찬 연어들처럼)	Kang San-ae	—

=== 153rd Generation Mask King ===
- Contestants: Kang Seung-hee (Wink), Kang Joo-hee (singer, born 1983) (Wink), Gil Byung-min (Letteamor), Ryu Seung-min, Rocky (Astro), Yoon Hyun-sook (Zam), Youme, Sohee (Elris)
Episodes 305 – 306

Episode 305

Episode 305 was broadcast on May 2, 2021. This marks the beginning of the Hundred-fifty-third Generation.

Order	Stage Name	Real Name	Song	Original artist	Vote
Round 1
Pair 1	Diet	Kang Seung-hee of Wink	Only You Wouldn't Know (너만은 모르길)	As One	13
Pair 1	Yo-Yo	Kang Joo-hee of Wink	Only You Wouldn't Know (너만은 모르길)	As One	8
2nd Song	Yo-Yo	Kang Joo-hee of Wink	Lying on the Sea (바다에 누워)	The Treble Clef	—
Pair 2	Dragon Palace Wedding Hall	Gil Byung-min of Letteamor	This Is the Moment (Korean version) (지금 이 순간)	Musical Jekyll and Hyde OST	17
Pair 2	Mr. Octopus	Ryu Seung-min	This Is the Moment (Korean version) (지금 이 순간)	Musical Jekyll and Hyde OST	4
2nd Song	Mr. Octopus	Ryu Seung-min	You Can Do It (넌 할 수 있어)	Kang San-ae	—
Pair 3	The Bad Son Cries	Rocky of Astro	All for You	Cool	15
Pair 3	Good Son	Yoon Hyun-sook of Zam	All for You	Cool	6
2nd Song	Good Son	Yoon Hyun-sook of Zam	The Pierrot Laughs at Us (삐에로는 우릴 보고 웃지)	Kim Wan-sun	—
Pair 4	Emerald of May	Youme	One's Way Back (귀로)	Park Seon-joo	11
Pair 4	Daisy of May	Sohee of Elris	One's Way Back (귀로)	Park Seon-joo	10
2nd Song	Daisy of May	Sohee of Elris	Just in Love (꿈을 모아서)	S.E.S.	—

Episode 306

Episode 306 was broadcast on May 9, 2021.

Order	Stage Name	Real Name	Song	Original artist	Vote
Round 2
Pair 1	Diet	Kang Seung-hee of Wink	Flower Garden (꽃밭에서)	Jung Hoon-hee	12
Pair 1	Dragon Palace Wedding Hall	Gil Byung-min of Letteamor	Forever with You (그대와 영원히)	Lee Moon-sae	9
Pair 2	The Bad Son Cries	Rocky of Astro	Hold My Hand (The Greatest Love OST) (내 손을 잡아)	IU	5
Pair 2	Emerald of May	Youme	Lost Child (미아)	Lena Park	16
Round 3
Finalists	Diet	Kang Seung-hee of Wink	Note of Youthfulness (젊음의 노트)	Yoo Mi-ri	4
Finalists	Emerald of May	Youme	Wild Flower (야생화)	Park Hyo-shin	17
Final
Battle	Emerald of May	Youme	Previous three songs used as voting standard		12
Battle	Baby Goat	Jeong Sun-ah	Higher	Ailee	9

=== 154th Generation Mask King ===
- Contestants: Kim Eun-young, Kang Ye-bin, Mo Tae-bum, Bae Jin-young (CIX), Kim Do-hyun, Lee Young-ji, Choi Byung-seo, Jeon In-hyuk (Yada)
Episodes 307 – 308

Episode 307

Episode 307 was broadcast on May 16, 2021. This marks the beginning of the Hundred-fifty-fourth Generation.

Order	Stage Name	Real Name	Song	Original artist	Vote
Round 1
Pair 1	Puzzle	Kim Eun-young	If You're Gonna Be Like This (이럴거면)	Ivy	20
Pair 1	Blocks	Kang Ye-bin	If You're Gonna Be Like This (이럴거면)	Ivy	1
2nd Song	Blocks	Kang Ye-bin	Why Don't You Know (왜 모르니)	Byul	—
Pair 2	Champion	Mo Tae-bum	From January to June (1월부터 6월까지)	015B & Yoon Jong-shin	2
Pair 2	Sesame Oil	Bae Jin-young of CIX	From January to June (1월부터 6월까지)	015B & Yoon Jong-shin	19
2nd Song	Champion	Mo Tae-bum	Marry Me (결혼해줘)	Im Chang-jung	—
Pair 3	I'm Telling You to Go!	Kim Do-hyun	Lonely	2NE1	5
Pair 3	I'm Getting Off This Time	Lee Young-ji	Lonely	2NE1	16
2nd Song	I'm Telling You to Go!	Kim Do-hyun	MaMa	Bobby Kim	—
Pair 4	Hanrabong	Choi Byung-seo	The Woman Outside the Window (창밖의 여자)	Cho Yong-pil	9
Pair 4	Ttabong	Jeon In-hyuk of Yada	The Woman Outside the Window (창밖의 여자)	Cho Yong-pil	12
2nd Song	Hanrabong	Choi Byung-seo	At Andong Station (안동역에서)	Jin Sung	—

Episode 308

Episode 308 was broadcast on May 23, 2021.

Order	Stage Name	Real Name	Song	Original artist	Vote
Round 2
Pair 1	Puzzle	Kim Eun-young	Stop the Time (시간아 멈춰라)	Davichi	15
Pair 1	Sesame Oil	Bae Jin-young of CIX	Don't Forget (잊어버리지 마)	Crush ft. Taeyeon	6
Pair 2	I'm Getting Off This Time	Lee Young-ji	After This Night (이 밤이 지나면)	Yim Jae-beom	3
Pair 2	Ttabong	Jeon In-hyuk of Yada	Even Tear Drops in Your Eyes (그대 눈물까지도)	Two Two	18
Special	I'm Getting Off This Time	Lee Young-ji	I Am Lee Young Ji (나는 이영지)	Lee Young-ji	—
Round 3
Finalists	Puzzle	Kim Eun-young	Through the Night (밤편지)	IU	10
Finalists	Ttabong	Jeon In-hyuk of Yada	Although I Loved You (사랑했지만)	Kim Kwang-seok	11
Special	Puzzle	Kim Eun-young	Pit-A-Pat (The Greatest Love OST) (두근두근)	Sunny Hill	—
Final
Battle	Ttabong	Jeon In-hyuk of Yada	Previous three songs used as voting standard		1
Battle	Emerald of May	Youme	Live a Long Long Time (그대가 그대를)	Lee Seung-hwan	20

=== 155th Generation Mask King ===
- Contestants: Jang Hyun-chul, Kim Sang-hyuk (Click-B), Kim Seol, Jin Won, Kim Dong-han (WEi), Dong Hyun-bae, Lee Eun-ha, Jang Yoon-jeong
Episodes 309 – 310

Episode 309

Episode 309 was broadcast on May 30, 2021. This marks the beginning of the Hundred-fifty-fifth Generation.

Order	Stage Name	Real Name	Song	Original artist	Vote
Round 1
Pair 1	Happiness Does Not Come in Grades	Jang Hyun-chul	Like Rain, Like Music (비처럼 음악처럼)	Kim Hyun-sik	20
Pair 1	You're a Student and I'm a Teacher!	Kim Sang-hyuk of Click-B	Like Rain, Like Music (비처럼 음악처럼)	Kim Hyun-sik	1
2nd Song	You're a Student and I'm a Teacher!	Kim Sang-hyuk of Click-B	After Breaking Up (헤어진 후에)	Y2K	—
Pair 2	Cinderella	Kim Seol	Good Day (좋은 날)	IU	7
Pair 2	Mozzarella	Jin Won	Good Day (좋은 날)	IU	14
2nd Song	Cinderella	Kim Seol	W.H.I.T.E	White	—
Pair 3	Beware of Dogs	Kim Dong-han of Wei	Only Look at Me (나만 바라봐)	Taeyang	17
Pair 3	Be Careful of What you Say	Dong Hyun-bae	Only Look at Me (나만 바라봐)	Taeyang	4
2nd Song	Be Careful of What you Say	Dong Hyun-bae	My Only Friend (나만의 친구)	Solid	—
Pair 4	Girl with Short Hair	Lee Eun-ha	Sparks (불티)	Jeon Young-rok	20
Pair 4	Girl with Long Straight Hair	Jang Yoon-jeong	Sparks (불티)	Jeon Young-rok	1
2nd Song	Girl with Long Straight Hair	Jang Yoon-jeong	Some Day (언젠가는)	Lee Tzsche	—

Episode 310

Episode 310 was broadcast on June 6, 2021.

Order	Stage Name	Real Name	Song	Original artist	Vote
Round 2
Pair 1	Happiness Does Not Come in Grades	Jang Hyun-chul	Heeya (희야)	Boohwal	12
Pair 1	Mozzarella	Jin Won	Please Find Her (그녀를 찾아주세요)	The Name	9
Pair 2	Beware of Dogs	Kim Dong-han of Wei	If We (이럴거면 헤어지지 말았어야지)	Park Won	3
Pair 2	Girl with Short Hair	Lee Eun-ha	Change	Jo Jang-hyuk	18
Round 3
Finalists	Happiness Does Not Come in Grades	Jang Hyun-chul	Delilah (딜라일라)	Jo Young-nam	3
Finalists	Girl with Short Hair	Lee Eun-ha	Beautiful Rivers and Mountains (아름다운 강산)	Shin Jung-hyeon	18
Special	Happiness Does Not Come in Grades	Jang Hyun-chul	Walk to the Sky (걸어서 하늘까지)	Jang Hyun-chul	—
Final
Battle	Girl with Short Hair	Lee Eun-ha	Previous three songs used as voting standard		10
Battle	Emerald of May	Youme	Come Back Home	2NE1	11
Special	Girl with Short Hair	Lee Eun-ha	You Let Me Go with a Smile (Don't Cry for Me) (미소를 띄우며 나를 보낸 그 모습처럼)	Lee Eun-ha	—

=== 156th Generation Mask King ===
- Contestants: Sole (South Korean singer), Yoon Gi-won, Monday (South Korean singer) (Weeekly), Nancy Lang, Yeo Esther, Lee Gyu-seok, Park Min-hye (Big Mama), Choi Byung-chul
Episodes 311 – 312

Episode 311

Episode 311 was broadcast on June 13, 2021. This marks the beginning of the Hundred-fifty-sixth Generation.

Order	Stage Name	Real Name	Song	Original artist	Vote
Round 1
Pair 1	Shih Tzu	Sole	Love Two (사랑 Two)	Yoon Do-hyun	17
Pair 1	Easy	Yoon Gi-won	Love Two (사랑 Two)	Yoon Do-hyun	4
2nd Song	Easy	Yoon Gi-won	Met Her 100m Away (그녀를 만나는 곳 100m 전)	Lee Sang-woo	—
Pair 2	Drawing Lots	Monday of Weeekly	Valenti	BoA	18
Pair 2	Ladder Riding	Nancy Lang	Valenti	BoA	3
2nd Song	Ladder Riding	Nancy Lang	3! 4!	Roo'ra	—
Pair 3	Parakeet Couple	Yeo Esther	Let's Go Travel (여행을 떠나요)	Cho Yong-pil	3
Pair 3	Chicken Skin Couple	Lee Gyu-seok	Let's Go Travel (여행을 떠나요)	Cho Yong-pil	18
2nd Song	Parakeet Couple	Yeo Esther	Secret Love (몰래한 사랑)	Kim Ji-ae	—
Pair 4	Sori-kkun	Park Min-hye of Big Mama	Gather My Tears (내 눈물 모아)	Seo Ji-won	19
Pair 4	Lover	Choi Byung-chul	Gather My Tears (내 눈물 모아)	Seo Ji-won	2
2nd Song	Lover	Choi Byung-chul	Your Shampoo Scent in the Flowers (흔들리는 꽃들 속에서 네 샴푸향이 느껴진거야)	Jang Beom-june	—

Episode 312

Episode 312 was broadcast on June 20, 2021.

Order	Stage Name	Real Name	Song	Original artist	Vote
Round 2
Pair 1	Shih Tzu	Sole	Solo	Jennie	11
Pair 1	Drawing Lots	Monday of Weeekly	How Can I Love the Heartbreak, You're the One I Love (어떻게 이별까지 사랑하겠어, 널 사랑하는 거지)	AKMU	10
Pair 2	Chicken Skin Couple	Lee Gyu-seok	Your Smile in My Memory (미소속에 비친 그대)	Shin Seung-hun	5
Pair 2	Sori-kkun	Park Min-hye of Big Mama	Then Something (그런 일은)	Hwayobi	16
Special	Chicken Skin Couple	Lee Gyu-seok	Trains and Pine Trees (기차와 소나무)	Lee Gyu-seok	—
Round 3
Finalists	Shih Tzu	Sole	I'm in Love	Ra.D	4
Finalists	Sori-kkun	Park Min-hye of Big Mama	Heaven	Ailee	17
Final
Battle	Sori-kkun	Park Min-hye of Big Mama	Previous three songs used as voting standard		16
Battle	Emerald of May	Youme	Don't Be Sad (슬픈 표정 하지 말아요)	Shin Hae-chul	5
Special	Emerald of May	Youme	Love Is Always Thirsty (사랑은 언제나 목마르다)	Youme	—

=== 157th Generation Mask King ===
- Contestants: Choi Ye-na, KyoungSeo, Lee Ji-hoon, Lee Hoon, Lee Jae-young, Oh Ji-heon, Choi Jung-in, Yang Eun-ji
Episodes 313 – 314

Episode 313

Episode 313 was broadcast on June 27, 2021. This marks the beginning of the Hundred-fifty-seventh Generation.

Order	Stage Name	Real Name	Song	Original artist	Vote
Round 1
Pair 1	MBTI	Choi Ye-na	Can't Do (못해)	4Men ft. Mi (美)	6
Pair 1	MSG	KyoungSeo	Can't Do (못해)	4Men ft. Mi (美)	15
2nd Song	MBTI	Choi Ye-na	Why Don't You Know	Chungha ft. Nucksal	—
Pair 2	Descendant of the Sun	Lee Ji-hoon	Friends (친구)	Ahn Jae-wook	17
Pair 2	Descendant of the Warrior	Lee Hoon	Friends (친구)	Ahn Jae-wook	4
2nd Song	Descendant of the Warrior	Lee Hoon	Side Road (골목길)	Shinchon Blues	—
Pair 3	Flowers	Lee Jae-young	Aspirin (아스피린)	Girl (걸)	20
Pair 3	Mushroom	Oh Ji-heon	Aspirin (아스피린)	Girl (걸)	1
2nd Song	Mushroom	Oh Ji-heon	Don't Leave Me (날 떠나지마)	Park Jin-young	—
Pair 4	Hwachae	Choi Jung-in	Resignation (체념)	Big Mama	18
Pair 4	Cold Vegetables	Yang Eun-ji	Resignation (체념)	Big Mama	3
2nd Song	Cold Vegetables	Yang Eun-ji	I Fell in Love (난 사랑에 빠졌죠)	Park Ji-yoon	—

Episode 314

Episode 314 was broadcast on July 4, 2021.

Order	Stage Name	Real Name	Song	Original artist	Vote
Round 2
Pair 1	MSG	KyoungSeo	If It Is You (Another Miss Oh OST) (너였다면)	Jung Seung-hwan	5
Pair 1	Descendant of the Sun	Lee Ji-hoon	Be Forgotten (잊혀지다)	Jung Key ft. Yang Da-il	16
Pair 2	Flowers	Lee Jae-young	Hahaha Song (하하하쏭)	Jaurim	3
Pair 2	Hwachae	Choi Jung-in	One-sided Love (짝사랑)	Gigs	18
Special	Blossom	Lee Jae-young	Temptation (유혹)	Lee Jae-young	—
Round 3
Finalists	Descendant of the Sun	Lee Ji-hoon	Don't Be Happy (행복하지 말아요)	MC the Max	6
Finalists	Hwachae	Choi Jung-in	Run With Me (도망가자)	Sunwoo Jung-a	15
Final
Battle	Hwachae	Choi Jung-in	Previous three songs used as voting standard		11
Battle	Sori-kkun	Park Min-hye of Big Mama	My Story	Brown Eyed Soul	10

=== 158th Generation Mask King ===
- Contestants: Jeong Se-woon, pH-1, Leeds, Kim Young-man, Kim Sa-eun (Musical actress), Lee Sang-byeok, Yoari, Hyebin (Momoland)
Episodes 315 – 316

Episode 315

Episode 315 was broadcast on July 11, 2021. This marks the beginning of the Hundred-fifty-eighth Generation.

Order	Stage Name	Real Name	Song	Original artist	Vote
Round 1
Pair 1	Butter	Jeong Se-woon	Johnny (자니)	Primary ft. Dynamic Duo	21
Pair 1	Center	pH-1	Johnny (자니)	Primary ft. Dynamic Duo	0
2nd Song	Center	PH-1	Expectation (기대)	Na Yoon-kwon	—
Pair 2	Balloon Flower	Leeds	My Heart Is Near You (내 마음 당신 곁으로)	Kim Jeong-soo	18
Pair 2	X-Large	Kim Young-man	My Heart Is Near You (내 마음 당신 곁으로)	Kim Jeong-soo	3
2nd Song	X-Large	Kim Young-man	It's You (그건 너)	Lee Jang-hee	—
Pair 3	Sea Otter	Kim Sa-eun	Label of Love (사랑의 이름표)	Hyun Cheol	15
Pair 3	Moon of the Sea	Lee Sang-byeok	Label of Love (사랑의 이름표)	Hyun Cheol	6
2nd Song	Moon of the Sea	Lee Sang-byeok	Backdaljae with Tears (울고 넘는 박달재)	Park Jae-hong	—
Pair 4	Fire Staring	Yoari	Remove all Traces of Time (세월의 흔적 다 버리고)	015B & O.When	19
Pair 4	Water Staring	Hyebin of Momoland	Remove all Traces of Time (세월의 흔적 다 버리고)	015B & O.When	2
2nd Song	Water Staring	Hyebin of Momoland	Password 486 (비밀번호 486)	Younha	—

Episode 316

Episode 316 was broadcast on July 18, 2021.

Order	Stage Name	Real Name	Song	Original artist	Vote
Round 2
Pair 1	Butter	Jeong Se-woon	Who Are You (Guardian: The Lonely and Great God OST)	Sam Kim	8
Pair 1	Balloon Flower	Leeds	Don't Go Today (오늘은 가지마)	Im Se-joon	13
Pair 2	Sea Otter	Kim Sa-eun	Hey, Hey, Hey	Jaurim	3
Pair 2	Fire Staring	Yoari	Feeling	Kim Sa-rang	18
Round 3
Finalists	Balloon Flower	Leeds	180 Degree (180도)	Ben	6
Finalists	Fire Staring	Yoari	A Person in My Dream (몽중인)	Lena Park	15
Special	Balloon Flower	Leeds	You Will Be Happy without Me (그댄 행복에 살텐데)	Leeds	—
Final
Battle	Fire Staring	Yoari	Previous three songs used as voting standard		8
Battle	Hwachae	Choi Jung-in	My Ear's Candy (내귀에 캔디)	Baek Ji-young ft. Taecyeon	13

=== 159th Generation Mask King ===
- Contestants: Yang Ji-eun, Kim Jae-yup, Lee Min-hyuk (BtoB), Park Sul-nyeo, Kim Yong-il (UP), Choi Eun-joo, Dahyun (Rocket Punch), Bae Doo-hoon (Forestella)
Episodes 317 – 318

Episode 317

Episode 317 was broadcast on August 8, 2021. This marks the beginning of the Hundred-fifty-ninth Generation.

Order	Stage Name	Real Name	Song	Original artist	Vote
Opening	Honey & Baby	Louie & U Sung-eun	In Summer (여름 안에서)	Deux	—
Round 1
Pair 1	Nightmare	Yang Ji-eun	It's Me (나야 나)	Nam Jin	19
Pair 1	Scissors	Kim Jae-yup	It's Me (나야 나)	Nam Jin	2
2nd Song	Scissors	Kim Jae-yup	Don't Tackle Me (태클을 걸지마)	Jin Sung	—
Pair 2	Pineapple	Minhyuk of BtoB	With You Everyday (매일 그대와)	Deulgukhwa	14
Pair 2	Guava	Park Sul-nyeo	With You Everyday (매일 그대와)	Deulgukhwa	7
2nd Song	Guava	Park Sul-nyeo	Give Me Back My Youth (청춘을 돌려다오)	Shin Haeng-il	—
Pair 3	Run to You	Kim Yong-il of UP	Summer Story (여름 이야기)	DJ DOC	8
Pair 3	3!4!	Choi Eun-joo	Summer Story (여름 이야기)	DJ DOC	13
2nd Song	Run to You	Kim Yong-il of UP	Don't Say Goodbye (안녕이라고 말하지마)	Lee Seung-chul	—
Special	Run to You	Kim Yong-il of UP	The Sea (바다) & Ppuyo Ppuyo (뿌요뿌요)	UP	—
Pair 4	Girl that Stays at Home a Lot	Dahyun of Rocket Punch	Day by Day	Fly to the Sky	7
Pair 4	Non-face-to-face Boyfriend	Bae Doo-hoon of Forestella	Day by Day	Fly to the Sky	14
2nd Song	Girl that Stays at Home a Lot	Dahyun of Rocket Punch	I Don't Care	2NE1	—

Episode 318

Episode 318 was broadcast on August 15, 2021.

Order	Stage Name	Real Name	Song	Original artist	Vote
Round 2
Pair 1	Nightmare	Yang Ji-eun	Trap of Youth (청춘의 덫)	Ji Soo	16
Pair 1	Pineapple	Minhyuk of BtoB	Monster	Red Velvet – Irene & Seulgi	5
Pair 2	3!4!	Choi Eun-joo	Kiss Me	S♯arp	3
Pair 2	Non-face-to-face Boyfriend	Bae Doo-hoon of Forestella	Timeless	SG Wannabe	18
Round 3
Finalists	Nightmare	Yang Ji-eun	Yeongam Arirang (영암 아리랑)	Ha Choon-hwa	10
Finalists	Non-face-to-face Boyfriend	Bae Doo-hoon of Forestella	Goodbye	Park Hyo-shin	11
Final
Battle	Non-face-to-face Boyfriend	Bae Doo-hoon of Forestella	Previous three songs used as voting standard		12
Battle	Hwachae	Choi Jung-in	Fake Love	BTS	9

=== 160th Generation Mask King ===
- Contestants: Bae Seung-min (Golden Child), Jay B (Got7), Kwak Beom, Sungmin (Super Junior), Im Sung-eun (Young Turks Club), Christina Confalonieri, Johnny Lee, Park Joon-geum
Episodes 319 – 320

Episode 319

Episode 319 was broadcast on August 22, 2021. This marks the beginning of the Hundred-sixtieth Generation.

Order	Stage Name	Real Name	Song	Original artist	Vote
Round 1
Pair 1	My House	Seungmin of Golden Child	Fall (어떻게 지내)	Crush	11
Pair 1	Toad House	Jay B of Got7	Fall (어떻게 지내)	Crush	10
2nd Song	Toad House	Jay B of Got7	We Should've Been Friends (친구라도 될걸 그랬어)	Gummy	—
Pair 2	Military Boots	Kwak Beom	Love	Jo Jang-hyuk	6
Pair 2	Rubber Shoes	Sungmin of Super Junior	Love	Jo Jang-hyuk	15
2nd Song	Military Boots	Kwak Beom	Be Mine (내꺼하자)	Infinite	—
Pair 3	Harmonica	Im Sung-eun of Young Turks Club	Americano (아메리카노)	10cm	15
Pair 3	Recorder	Christina Confalonieri	Americano (아메리카노)	10cm	6
2nd Song	Recorder	Christina Confalonieri	Eomeona! (어머나!)	Jang Yoon-jeong	—
Pair 4	Mung-bean Pancake Gentleman	Johnny Lee	I Loved You (사랑했어요)	Kim Hyun-sik	18
Pair 4	Florist Lady	Park Joon-geum	I Loved You (사랑했어요)	Kim Hyun-sik	3
2nd Song	Florist Lady	Park Joon-geum	Waiting for Tomorrow (내일을 기다려)	Park Kang-sung	—

Episode 320

Episode 320 was broadcast on August 29, 2021.

Order	Stage Name	Real Name	Song	Original artist	Vote
Round 2
Pair 1	My House	Seungmin of Golden Child	My House (우리집)	2PM	5
Pair 1	Rubber Shoes	Sungmin of Super Junior	One of My People Go (내 하나의 사람은 가고)	Im Hee-sook	16
Pair 2	Harmonica	Im Sung-eun of Young Turks Club	Stigma (낙인)	Yim Jae-beom	3
Pair 2	Mung-bean Pancake Gentleman	Johnny Lee	Faraway, My Honey (님은 먼 곳에)	Kim Choo-ja	18
Special	Harmonica	Im Sung-eun of Young Turks Club	Affection (Dangerous Breakup) (정 (위험한 이별))	Young Turks Club	—
Round 3
Finalists	Rubber Shoes	Sungmin of Super Junior	Uphill Road (오르막길)	Yoon Jong-shin ft. Jung-in	3
Finalists	Mung-bean Pancake Gentleman	Johnny Lee	Camellia Lady (동백아가씨)	Lee Mi-ja	18
Final
Battle	Mung-bean Pancake Gentleman	Johnny Lee	Previous three songs used as voting standard		11
Battle	Non-face-to-face Boyfriend	Bae Doo-hoon of Forestella	Marry Me	Maktub	10

=== 161st Generation Mask King ===
- Contestants: Lim Kim, Bae Young-man, Seo In-young, Lee Euaerin (Nine Muses), Kim Ji-hyun (Roo'ra), Wang Ji-hye, Lee Dae-hyung, Park Wan-kyu
Episodes 321 – 322

Episode 321

Episode 321 was broadcast on September 5, 2021. This marks the beginning of the Hundred-sixty-first Generation.

Order	Stage Name	Real Name	Song	Original artist	Vote
Round 1
Pair 1	Rocking Chair	Lim Kim	I Always Miss You (나항상 그대를)	Lee Sun-hee	13
Pair 1	Rocking Rock	Bae Young-man	I Always Miss You (나항상 그대를)	Lee Sun-hee	8
2nd Song	Rocking Rock	Bae Young-man	Winter Rain Is Falling (겨울비는 내리고)	Kim Beom-ryong	—
Pair 2	High Heels	Seo In-young	Something	Girl's Day	19
Pair 2	Glass Shoes	Lee Euaerin of Nine Muses	Something	Girl's Day	2
2nd Song	Glass Shoes	Lee Euaerin of Nine Muses	Star (저 별)	Heize	—
Pair 3	Atlantis Princess	Kim Ji-hyun of Roo'ra	One More Time (한번만 더)	Park Sung-shin	17
Pair 3	Bold Woman	Wang Ji-hye	One More Time (한번만 더)	Park Sung-shin	4
2nd Song	Bold Woman	Wang Ji-hye	After Play (연극이 끝난 후)	S♯arp	—
Pair 4	Good Morning	Lee Dae-hyung	Endless	Flower	2
Pair 4	Good Night	Park Wan-kyu	Endless	Flower	19
2nd Song	Good Morning	Lee Dae-hyung	Because You're My Woman (내 여자라니까)	Lee Seung-gi	—

Episode 322

Episode 322 was broadcast on September 12, 2021.

Order	Stage Name	Real Name	Song	Original artist	Vote
Round 2
Pair 1	Rocking Chair	Lim Kim	Flying, Deep in the Night (깊은 밤을 날아서)	Lee Moon-sae	4
Pair 1	High Heels	Seo In-young	Sun Sets in My Heart (가슴에 지는 태양)	Kim Bum-soo	17
Pair 2	Atlantis Princess	Kim Ji-hyun of Roo'ra	Love is as Like a Fragile Glass (사랑은 유리 같은 것)	Won Joon-hee	4
Pair 2	Good Night	Park Wan-kyu	If I Hold You in My Arms (너를 품에 안으면)	Cult	17
Round 3
Finalists	High Heels	Seo In-young	Love, ing (열애중)	Ben	11
Finalists	Good Night	Park Wan-kyu	For You (너를 위해)	Yim Jae-beom	10
Final
Battle	High Heels	Seo In-young	Previous three songs used as voting standard		2
Battle	Mung-bean Pancake Gentleman	Johnny Lee	I Lost Love (사랑을 잃어버린 나)	Lee Kwang-jo	19

=== Chuseok Special: Duet Mask Kings ===
- Contestants: Kim Min-seok (MeloMance) & Kim Woo-seok (actor), Kihyun (Monsta X) & Jeong Se-woon, Hong Ji-yoon & Hong Ji-hyun, Lee Min (As One) & Lisa, Kim Tae-gyun & Kim Tae-gyun (Cultwo), Park Hyun-jin & Park Goo-yoon, Yoon Hyung-bin & Jung Kyung-mi, Lee Ji-young (singer) (Big Mama) & Lee Seung-woo (singer) (Soulstar)
Episodes 323 – 325

Episode 323

Episode 323 was broadcast on September 19, 2021. Winner of this special episodes ("Sibling Rebellion") revealed their identities through a special performance on the beginning of episode 327.

Order	Stage Name	Real Name	Song	Original artist	Vote
Round 1
Pair 1	Brave Brothers	Kim Min-seok of MeloMance & Kim Woo-seok	And July	Heize ft. Dean ft. DJ Friz	14
Pair 1	Cheongdam-dong Brothers-in-law	Kihyun of Monsta X & Jeong Se-woon	And July	Heize ft. Dean ft. DJ Friz	7
2nd Song	Cheongdam-dong Brothers	Kihyun of Monsta X & Jeong Se-woon	Confession (고백)	Jung Joon-il	—
Pair 2	Okay, Excited Sisters	Hong Ji-yoon & Hong Ji-hyun	On Rainy Days (비가 오는 날엔)	Beast	14
Pair 2	Fantastic Partners	Lee Min of As One & Lisa	On Rainy Days (비가 오는 날엔)	Beast	7
2nd Song	Fantastic Partners	Lee Min of As One & Lisa	Just a Feeling	S.E.S.	—
Pair 3	The Fish-Shaped Bun Friend	Former baseball player Kim Tae-gyun & Kim Tae-gyun of Cultwo	You That Meet Unexpectedly (어쩌다 마주친 그대)	Songgolmae	2
Pair 3	The 25th Generation of a Famous Singer	Park Hyun-jin & Park Goo-yoon	You That Meet Unexpectedly (어쩌다 마주친 그대)	Songgolmae	19
2nd Song	The Fish-Shaped Bun Friend	Former baseball player Kim Tae-gyun & Kim Tae-gyun of Cultwo	That Was What Happened Then (그땐 그랬지)	Carnival	—

Episode 324

Episode 324 was broadcast on September 26, 2021.

Order	Stage Name	Real Name	Song	Original artist	Vote
Round 1
Pair 4	Royal Family	Yoon Hyung-bin & Jung Kyung-mi	I Knew that I Love You (사랑하게 될 줄 알았어)	Shin Hyo-beom	4
Pair 4	Sibling Rebellion	Lee Ji-young of Big Mama & Lee Seung-woo of Soulstar	I Knew that I Love You (사랑하게 될 줄 알았어)	Shin Hyo-beom	17
2nd Song	Royal Family	Yoon Hyung-bin & Jung Kyung-mi	The Woman in the Rain (빗속의 여인)	Shin Jung-hyeon	—
Round 2
Special	Mung-bean Pancake Gentleman	Johnny Lee	My Way	Frank Sinatra	—
Pair 1	Brave Brothers	Kim Min-seok of MeloMance & Kim Woo-seok	Proposal (청혼)	Noel	16
Pair 1	Okay, Excited Sisters	Hong Ji-yoon & Hong Ji-hyun	Twinkle	Girls' Generation-TTS	5
Pair 2	The 25th Generation of a Famous Singer	Park Hyun-jin & Park Goo-yoon	Maze of Love (사랑의 미로)	Choi Jin-hee	6
Pair 2	Sibling Rebellion	Lee Ji-young of Big Mama & Lee Seung-woo of Soulstar	Timeless	Zhang Liyin ft. Kim Junsu	15

Episode 325

Episode 325 was broadcast on October 3, 2021.

Order	Stage Name	Real Name	Song	Original artist	Vote
Final
Finalists	Brave Brothers	Kim Min-seok of MeloMance & Kim Woo-seok	Like a Child (아이처럼)	Kim Dong-ryool	3
Finalists	Sibling Rebellion	Lee Ji-young of Big Mama & Lee Seung-woo of Soulstar	Hand in Hand (손에 손 잡고)	Koreana	18

=== 162nd Generation Mask King ===
- Contestants: Kim Doo-young, Choi Sung-min, Kim Jin-woong (born 1979), Park Hyun-woo, Nada, Hwang Youn-joo, Onesun, Kim Yong-jun (SG Wannabe)
Episodes 325 – 326

Episode 325

Episode 325 was broadcast on October 3, 2021. This marks the beginning of the Hundred-sixty-second Generation.

Order	Stage Name	Real Name	Song	Original artist	Vote
Round 1
Pair 1	Striker	Kim Doo-young	Confession (고백)	Park Hye-kyung	3
Pair 1	Defender	Choi Sung-min	Confession (고백)	Park Hye-kyung	18
2nd Song	Striker	Kim Doo-young	Forever (영원히)	N.EX.T	—
Pair 2	Umbrella	Kim Jin-woong	Tearful Farewell (뜨거운 안녕)	Johnny Lee	10
Pair 2	Woojangsan	Park Hyun-woo	Tearful Farewell (뜨거운 안녕)	Johnny Lee	11
2nd Song	Umbrella	Kim Jin-woong	Sonata of Temptation (유혹의 소나타)	Ivy	—
Pair 3	Red Flavor	Nada	Beautiful	Beast	18
Pair 3	Mild Taste	Hwang Youn-joo	Beautiful	Beast	3
2nd Song	Mild Taste	Hwang Youn-joo	Farewell for Me (날 위한 이별)	Kim Hye-rim	—

Episode 326

Episode 326 was broadcast on October 10, 2021.

Order	Stage Name	Real Name	Song	Original artist	Vote
Round 1
Pair 4	Thunder and Lightning	Onesun	I Miss You	Kang Susie	1
Pair 4	Thunder Tiger	Kim Yong-jun of SG Wannabe	I Miss You	Kang Susie	20
2nd Song	Thunder and Lightning	Onesun	Dream (꿈)	Lee Hyun-woo	—
Round 2
Pair 1	Defender	Choi Sung-min	Waiting (작은 기다림)	Cool	10
Pair 1	Woojangsan	Park Hyun-woo	To Be Alone (홀로 된다는 것)	Byun Jin-sub	11
Pair 2	Red Flavor	Nada	With Me	Wheesung (Realslow)	2
Pair 2	Thunder Tiger	Kim Yong-jun of SG Wannabe	Love Affair	Im Chang-jung	19
Round 3
Finalists	Woojangsan	Park Hyun-woo	Empty Heart (허무한 마음)	Jeong Won	2
Finalists	Thunder Tiger	Kim Yong-jun of SG Wannabe	Distant Memories of You (기억 속의 먼 그대에게)	Park Mi-kyung	19
Final
Battle	Thunder Tiger	Kim Yong-jun of SG Wannabe	Previous three songs used as voting standard		3
Battle	Mung-bean Pancake Gentleman	Johnny Lee	You Lived Like a Fool (바보처럼 살았군요)	Kim Do-hyang	18

=== 163rd Generation Mask King ===
- Contestants: N/A, Julian Jootaek Kim (Miraclass), Cho Gu-ham, Oh Sang-uk, Kim Young-ok, Maria, Lee Ye-joon, Carlos Galvan (Uptown)
Episodes 327 – 328
6

Episode 327

Episode 327 was broadcast on October 17, 2021. This marks the beginning of the Hundred-sixty-third Generation.

Order	Stage Name	Real Name	Song	Original artist	Vote
Special	Sibling Rebellion	Lee Ji-young of Big Mama & Lee Seung-woo of Soulstar	This Is Me	Keala Settle & The Greatest Showman Ensemble	—
Round 1
Pair 1	Always Hits the Mark	—N/a	—N/a	—N/a	—N/a
Pair 1	Unbeaten	Kim Joo-taek of Miraclass	—N/a	—N/a	—N/a
2nd Song	Always Hits the Mark	—N/a	—N/a	—N/a	—
Pair 2	Fate Symphony	Cho Gu-ham	Dear Love (사랑아)	The One	17
Pair 2	Chopsticks March	Oh Sang-uk	Dear Love (사랑아)	The One	4
2nd Song	Chopsticks March	Oh Sang-uk	Think of You (네 생각)	John Park	—
Pair 3	Nacho	Kim Young-ok	Sad Story of Old Couple (어느 60대 노부부 이야기)	Kim Mok-kyung	7
Pair 3	Tortilla	Maria	Sad Story of Old Couple (어느 60대 노부부 이야기)	Kim Mok-kyung	14
2nd Song	Nacho	Kim Young-ok	Empty Space (허공)	Cho Yong-pil	—
Pair 4	Bear Sole	Lee Ye-joon	Holding the End of this Night (이 밤의 끝을 잡고)	Solid	20
Pair 4	Cow's Feet	Carlos Galvan of Uptown	Holding the End of this Night (이 밤의 끝을 잡고)	Solid	1
2nd Song	Cow's Feet	Carlos Galvan of Uptown	A-Yo	Jinusean	—
Special	Cow Sole	Carlos Galvan of Uptown	Back to Me (다시 만나줘)	Uptown	—

Episode 328

Episode 328 was broadcast on October 24, 2021.

Order	Stage Name	Real Name	Song	Original artist	Vote
Round 2
Pair 1	Unbeaten	Kim Joo-taek of Miraclass	Back in Time (시간을 거슬러)	Lyn	11
Pair 1	Fate Symphony	Cho Gu-ham	Like It (좋니)	Yoon Jong-shin	10
Pair 2	Tortilla	Maria	We Meet Again (또 만났네요)	Joo Hyun-mi	0
Pair 2	Bear Sole	Lee Ye-joon	Hello	Huh Gak	21
Special	Tortilla	Maria	Crying in Regret (English version) (울면서 후회하네)	Joo Hyun-mi	—
Round 3
Finalists	Unbeaten	Kim Joo-taek of Miraclass	So You (그래서 그대는)	Yarn	4
Finalists	Bear Sole	Lee Ye-joon	Forsake (연)	Big Mama	17
Final
Battle	Bear Sole	Lee Ye-joon	Previous three songs used as voting standard		18
Battle	Mung-bean Pancake Gentleman	Johnny Lee	Going Years (가는 세월)	Seo Yoo-seok	3
Special	Mung-bean Pancake Gentleman	Johnny Lee	Tearful Farewell (뜨거운 안녕); Love Fool (바보 사랑)	Johnny Lee	—

=== 164th Generation Mask King ===
- Contestants: Yukika, Lee Hyun (5tion), Hwang Soo-kyung, Won Mi-yeon, Kim Sang-woo (Shinchon Blues), Jo Choon, Yang Jeong-won, Kim Jae-hwan
Episodes 329 – 330

Episode 329

Episode 329 was broadcast on October 31, 2021. This marks the beginning of the Hundred-sixty-fourth Generation.

Order	Stage Name	Real Name	Song	Original artist	Vote
Round 1
Pair 1	Tagger	Yukika	It's You (그대네요)	Sung Si-kyung & IU	2
Pair 1	Cubed Radish Kimchi	Lee Hyun of 5tion	It's You (그대네요)	Sung Si-kyung & IU	19
2nd Song	Tagger	Yukika	Umbrella (우산)	Younha	—
Pair 2	Amor Fati	Hwang Soo-kyung	You Let Me Go with a Smile (Don't Cry for Me) (미소를 띄우며 나를 보낸 그 모습처럼)	Lee Eun-ha	1
Pair 2	Happy Halloween	Won Mi-yeon	You Let Me Go with a Smile (Don't Cry for Me) (미소를 띄우며 나를 보낸 그 모습처럼)	Lee Eun-ha	20
2nd Song	Amor Fati	Hwang Soo-kyung	Unpredictable Life (알 수 없는 인생)	Lee Moon-sae	—
Pair 3	Unbelievable	Kim Sang-woo of Shinchon Blues	For Love (사랑을 위하여)	Kim Jong-hwan	17
Pair 3	Perfection	Jo Choon	For Love (사랑을 위하여)	Kim Jong-hwan	4
2nd Song	Perfection	Jo Choon	Chan Chan Chan (찬찬찬)	Pyeon Seung-yeop	—
Pair 4	Fairy of Shampoo	Yang Jeong-won	Butterfly (나비야)	Ha Dong-kyun	2
Pair 4	Ending Fairy	Kim Jae-hwan	Butterfly (나비야)	Ha Dong-kyun	19
Special	Ha Dong-kyun		Butterfly (나비야)	Ha Dong-kyun	—
2nd Song	Fairy of Shampoo	Yang Jeong-won	I'm Your Girl	S.E.S.	—

Episode 330

Episode 330 was broadcast on November 7, 2021.

Order	Stage Name	Real Name	Song	Original artist	Vote
Round 2
Pair 1	Cubed Radish Kimchi	Lee Hyun of 5tion	Sea of Love	Fly to the Sky	4
Pair 1	Happy Halloween	Won Mi-yeon	Remaining (미련)	Kim Gun-mo	17
Special	Cubed Radish Kimchi	Lee Hyun of 5tion	More Than Words	5tion	—
Pair 2	Unbelievable	Kim Sang-woo of Shinchon Blues	Pick Me (나야 나)	Produce 101	7
Pair 2	Ending Fairy	Kim Jae-hwan	Next Level	Aespa	14
Round 3
Finalists	Happy Halloween	Won Mi-yeon	365 Days (365일)	Ali	17
Finalists	Ending Fairy	Kim Jae-hwan	Walking Along (걷고 싶다)	Cho Yong-pil	4
Final
Battle	Happy Halloween	Won Mi-yeon	Previous three songs used as voting standard		6
Battle	Bear Sole	Lee Ye-joon	Train to the World (세계로 가는 기차)	Deulgukhwa	15
Special	Happy Halloween	Won Mi-yeon	Farewell Trip (이별여행)	Won Mi-yeon	—

=== 165th Generation Mask King ===
- Contestants: Linzy (Fiestar), Kim Kyung-ah, Kim Tae-sul, John Noh (RabidAnce), Yoo Mi-ri, Park Kang-sung, Kim Heung-soo, Chunja
Episodes 331 – 332

Episode 331

Episode 331 was broadcast on November 14, 2021. This marks the beginning of the Hundred-sixty-fifth Generation.

Order	Stage Name	Real Name	Song	Original artist	Vote
Round 1
Pair 1	One-off Payment	Linzy of Fiestar	Love	S.E.S.	17
Pair 1	Spoonworm	Kim Kyung-ah	Love	S.E.S.	4
2nd Song	Spoonworm	Kim Kyung-ah	Two of Us (둘이서)	Lee Chae-yeon	—
Pair 2	Buckwheat Flowers	Kim Tae-sul	Don't Go, Don't Go (가지마 가지마)	Brown Eyes	6
Pair 2	Camellia Flower	John Noh of RabidAnce	Don't Go, Don't Go (가지마 가지마)	Brown Eyes	15
2nd Song	Buckwheat Flowers	Kim Tae-sul	Do You Want to Walk with Me? (나랑 같이 걸을래 (바른연애 길잡이 X 적재))	Jukjae	—
Pair 3	A Woman who Looks Good in Jeans	Yoo Mi-ri	Wishes (희망사항)	Byun Jin-sub	5
Pair 3	A Man who Cooks Well Kimchi Fried Rice	Park Kang-sung	Wishes (희망사항)	Byun Jin-sub	16
2nd Song	A Woman who Looks Good in Jeans	Yoo Mi-ri	Shaky Friendship (흔들린 우정)	Hong Kyung-min	—
Special	A Woman who Looks Good in Jeans	Yoo Mi-ri	Note of Youthfulness (젊음의 노트)	Yoo Mi-ri	—
Pair 4	Cheer Up, Test-takers!	Kim Heung-soo	Traffic Light (신호등)	Lee Mu-jin	6
Pair 4	Boss, Nice Shot!	Chunja	Traffic Light (신호등)	Lee Mu-jin	15
2nd Song	Cheer Up, Test-takers!	Kim Heung-soo	Beautiful Fact (아름다운 사실)	Boohwal	—

Episode 332

Episode 332 was broadcast on November 21, 2021.

Order	Stage Name	Real Name	Song	Original artist	Vote
Round 2
Pair 1	One-off Payment	Linzy of Fiestar	Sending Love (송애)	Esther	13
Pair 1	Camellia Flower	John Noh of RabidAnce	The Unwritten Legend (전설속의 누군가처럼)	Shin Seung-hun	8
Pair 2	A Man who Cooks Well Kimchi Fried Rice	Park Kang-sung	About Romance (낭만에 대하여)	Choi Baek-ho	5
Pair 2	Boss, Nice Shot!	Chunja	My Love by My Side (내 사랑 내 곁에)	Kim Hyun-sik	16
Special	A Man who Cooks Well Kimchi Fried Rice	Park Kang-sung	Toy Soldiers (장난감 병정)	Park Kang-sung	—
Round 3
Finalists	One-off Payment	Linzy of Fiestar	One Woman (한 여자)	Ben	11
Finalists	Boss, Nice Shot!	Chunja	Knees (무릎)	IU	10
Final
Battle	One-off Payment	Linzy of Fiestar	Previous three songs used as voting standard		1
Battle	Bear Sole	Lee Ye-joon	Alone (홀로)	Jung Key & Kim Na-young	20

=== 166th Generation Mask King ===
- Contestants: An Yu-jin (Ive), Z-E (rapper) (Turtles), Jeon Cheol-woo, Im Hyung-soon (Five Fingers), Shin Ye-chan (singer) (Lucy), Im Hyuk-pil, Kwon Soon-woo, Rumble Fish
Episodes 333 – 334

Episode 333

Episode 333 was broadcast on November 28, 2021. This marks the beginning of the Hundred-sixty-sixth Generation.

Order	Stage Name	Real Name	Song	Original artist	Vote
Round 1
Pair 1	Olivia Hussey	An Yu-jin of Ive	Goodbye (안녕)	Park Hye-kyung	13
Pair 1	Beyoncé	Z-E of Turtles	Goodbye (안녕)	Park Hye-kyung	8
2nd Song	Beyoncé	Z-E of Turtles	I Will Love You (사랑할거야)	Baby Angel	—
Pair 2	Pork Back-bone Stew	Jeon Cheol-woo	I Like Saturday Night (토요일은 밤이 좋아)	Kim Jong-chan	5
Pair 2	Fish Cake Soup	Im Hyung-soon of Five Fingers	I Like Saturday Night (토요일은 밤이 좋아)	Kim Jong-chan	16
2nd Song	Pork Back-bone Stew	Jeon Cheol-woo	Said (라구요)	Kang San-ae	—
Pair 3	I Fall in Love Easily	Shin Ye-chan of Lucy	In Front of the Post Office in Autumn (가을 우체국 앞에서)	Kim Hyun-sung	18
Pair 3	Green Light	Im Hyuk-pil	In Front of the Post Office in Autumn (가을 우체국 앞에서)	Kim Hyun-sung	3
2nd Song	Green Light	Im Hyuk-pil	Spring Days of My Life (내 생애 봄날은)	Can	—
Pair 4	Driving By a Beginner	Kwon Soon-woo	Whistle (휘파람)	Lee Moon-sae	0
Pair 4	Driver's License	Rumble Fish	Whistle (휘파람)	Lee Moon-sae	21
2nd Song	Driving By a Beginner	Kwon Soon-woo	The Road to Me (내게 오는 길)	Sung Si-kyung	—

Episode 334

Episode 334 was broadcast on December 5, 2021.

Order	Stage Name	Real Name	Song	Original artist	Vote
Round 2
Pair 1	Olivia Hussey	An Yu-jin of Ive	Nappa (나빠)	Crush	4
Pair 1	Fish Cake Soup	Im Hyung-soon of Five Fingers	Moment Seeing First Time (처음 본 순간)	Songgolmae	17
Pair 2	I Fall in Love Easily	Shin Ye-chan of Lucy	Because I Love You (사랑하기 때문에)	Yoo Jae-ha	5
Pair 2	Driver's License	Rumble Fish	Nocturne (야상곡)	Kim Yoon-ah	16
Round 3
Finalists	Fish Cake Soup	Im Hyung-soon of Five Fingers	Sad Beatrice (슬픈 베아트리체)	Cho Yong-pil	8
Finalists	Driver's License	Rumble Fish	Turn on the Radio Loudly (크게 라디오를 켜고)	Sinawe	13
Special	Fish Cake Soup	Im Hyung-soon of Five Fingers	Balloon (풍선)	Five Fingers	—
Final
Battle	Driver's License	Rumble Fish	Previous three songs used as voting standard		5
Battle	Bear Sole	Lee Ye-joon	Are You Listening? (듣고 있나요)	Lee Seung-chul	16

=== 167th Generation Mask King ===
- Contestants: Kim Myung-seon, Jo Seung-goo, Bang Eun-hee, Joo Byung-seon, Mirani, Ryuji (singer) (Broccoli, You Too?), Lee Mu-jin, Choi Joon-suk
Episodes 335 – 336

Episode 335

Episode 335 was broadcast on December 12, 2021. This marks the beginning of the Hundred-sixty-seventh Generation.

Order	Stage Name	Real Name	Song	Original artist	Vote
Round 1
Pair 1	Let It Go	Kim Myung-seon	Only Just (뿐이고)	Park Goo-yoon	4
Pair 1	Let It Be	Jo Seung-goo	Only Just (뿐이고)	Park Goo-yoon	17
2nd Song	Let It Go	Kim Myung-seon	Ring Ring (따르릉)	Hong Jin-young	—
Pair 2	Shopping Basket	Bang Eun-hee	Happy Our Love (기쁜 우리 사랑은)	Choi Sung-soo	3
Pair 2	Bookmark	Joo Byung-seon	Happy Our Love (기쁜 우리 사랑은)	Choi Sung-soo	18
2nd Song	Shopping Basket	Bang Eun-hee	Seoul Tango (서울 탱고)	Bang Sil-yi	—
Pair 3	The Game of Go	Mirani	What Do I Do? (어떡하죠)	2AM	0
Pair 3	Puppy	Ryuji of Broccoli You Too	What Do I Do? (어떡하죠)	2AM	21
2nd Song	The Game of Go	Mirani	Rooftop (옥탑방)	N.Flying	—
Pair 4	Winter Kid	Lee Mu-jin	Fate (인연)	Lee Seung-chul	18
Pair 4	Winter Sea	Choi Joon-suk	Fate (인연)	Lee Seung-chul	3
2nd Song	Winter Sea	Choi Joon-suk	My Woman (내 여자)	The One	—

Episode 336

Episode 336 was broadcast on December 19, 2021.

Order	Stage Name	Real Name	Song	Original artist	Vote
Round 2
Pair 1	Let It Be	Jo Seung-goo	At Any Time (무시로)	Na Hoon-a	9
Pair 1	Bookmark	Joo Byung-seon	Seoul Seoul Seoul (서울 서울 서울)	Cho Yong-pil	12
Special	Let It Be	Jo Seung-goo	Wind Flower Girl (꽃바람 여인)	Jo Seung-goo	—
Pair 2	Puppy	Ryuji of Broccoli You Too	Let's Forget About It (이젠 잊기로 해요)	Kim Wan-sun	0
Pair 2	Winter Kid	Lee Mu-jin	With You (그대랑)	Lee Juck	21
Round 3
Finalists	Bookmark	Joo Byung-seon	The Yoke (멍에)	Kim Soo-hee	3
Finalists	Winter Kid	Lee Mu-jin	To You Again (너에게로 또 다시)	Byun Jin-sub	18
Special	Bookmark	Joo Byung-seon	Mt. Chilgab (칠갑산)	Joo Byung-seon	—
Final
Battle	Winter Kid	Lee Mu-jin	Previous three songs used as voting standard		13
Battle	Bear Sole	Lee Ye-joon	Left & Right	Seventeen	8

=== 168th Generation Mask King ===
- Contestants: Thunder, Danny Koo, Kim Sung-kyung, Kim Jang-soo (The Treble Clef), Bae Yoon-jeong, Rhee Dae-eun, Lee Kyung-ae, Kim Hye-yeon (South Korean singer)
Episode 337

Episode 337 was broadcast on December 26, 2021. This marks the beginning of the Hundred-sixty-eighth Generation.

Order	Stage Name	Real Name	Song	Original artist	Vote
Opening	Chow Yun-fat	Seungyoon of Winner	Bounce	Cho Yong-pil	—
Round 1
Pair 1	Rudolph the Red Nosed Reindeer	Thunder	Instinctively (본능적으로)	Yoon Jong-shin	16
Pair 1	Arrow Nose	Danny Koo	Instinctively (본능적으로)	Yoon Jong-shin	5
2nd Song	Arrow Nose	Danny Koo	Don't Say It's Not Love (사랑이 아니라 말하지 말아요)	Lee So-ra	—
Pair 2	Tiger	Kim Sung-kyung	Somebody's Dream (어떤이의 꿈)	Bom Yeoreum Gaeul Kyeoul	1
Pair 2	Dad	Kim Jang-soo of The Treble Clef	Somebody's Dream (어떤이의 꿈)	Bom Yeoreum Gaeul Kyeoul	20
2nd Song	Tiger	Kim Sung-kyung	You're in My Embrace (그대 내 품에)	Yoo Jae-ha	—
Pair 3	Graduation Photo	Bae Yoon-jeong	White Winter (하얀 겨울)	Mr. 2	12
Pair 3	Family Photo	Rhee Dae-eun	White Winter (하얀 겨울)	Mr. 2	9
2nd Song	Family Photo	Rhee Dae-eun	Confession Is Not Flashy (화려하지 않은 고백)	Lee Seung-hwan	—
Pair 4	Be Careful Not to Catch a Cold!	Lee Kyung-ae	The First Snow's Falling (첫눈이 온다구요)	Lee Jeong-seok	4
Pair 4	Everyone, Be Rich!	Kim Hye-yeon	The First Snow's Falling (첫눈이 온다구요)	Lee Jeong-seok	17
2nd Song	Be Careful Not to Catch a Cold!	Lee Kyung-ae	Spring Rain (봄비)	Lee Eun-ha	—
