= Velocidade =

Song by Santos Bravos

from the EP Dual
- Language: Portuguese
- Released: March 13, 2026
- Genre: Latin pop
- Length: 2:13
- Label: Hybe Latin America
- Songwriters: Ajaxx; Carl Björsell; Teemu Brunila; Carolzinha; Decz; Johnny Goldstein; Daniel Lien; Novodor; Julimar Santos
- Producers: Decz; Novodor

Visualizer
- "Velocidade" on YouTube

"Velocidade" is a song by boy band Santos Bravos from their debut extended play Dual, released on March 13, 2026, through Hybe Latin America. The song is a dynamic Portuguese-language Latin pop track rooted in the Brazilian funk tradition and infused with Latin club sounds, with driving percussion and bass-heavy drops.

== Background and recording ==
Penna described "Velocidade" as the group's second song entirely in Portuguese, following "0%", and as a highly energetic track influenced by the Brazilian funk tradition. He also revealed that, despite the difficulty of recording the song, the group completed the recording in less than three hours. Kauê identified "Velocidade" as his favorite track from Dual, explaining that its Portuguese lyrics allowed him to connect with the song and with Brazilian audiences in a different way. The non-Brazilian members also discussed the challenges of singing in Portuguese and credited Kauê with helping them learn the language.

== Commercial performance ==
On July 9, 2026, Brazilian music website POPline reported that "Velocidade" had surpassed "Kawasaki" to become Santos Bravos' most-streamed song on Spotify, with 22.4 million streams compared with 22.3 million for "Kawasaki".

== Live performances ==
In Seoul, South Korea, Santos Bravos began a series of performances of "Velocidade" on April 15, when they performed the song on the radio show Bae Cheol-soo's Music Camp. They subsequently performed it on M Countdown on April 16, Music Bank on April 17, Show! Music Core on April 18, and Inkigayo on April 19.

"Velocidade" was also included in a medley performed by the group in San Juan, Puerto Rico, at the Premios Tu Música Urbano.

The group later performed the track at the 23rd Premios Juventud in Marbella, Spain, on September 3.

== Credits and personnel ==
Credits are adapted from Apple Music.

- Decz – writer, producer, keyboards, bass, drum programming
- Novodor – writer, producer, keyboards, bass, drum programming
- Johnny Goldstein – writer, vocal production, keyboards, bass, drum programming
- Carolzinha – writer
- Julimar Santos – writer
- Daniel Lien – writer
- Ajaxx – writer
- Teemu Brunila – writer
- Carl Björsell – writer
- Manny Marroquin – mixing
- Joe LaPorta – mastering
- Jose Ignacio Martinez – recording
