= Santos Bravos =

Mexico City–based boy band

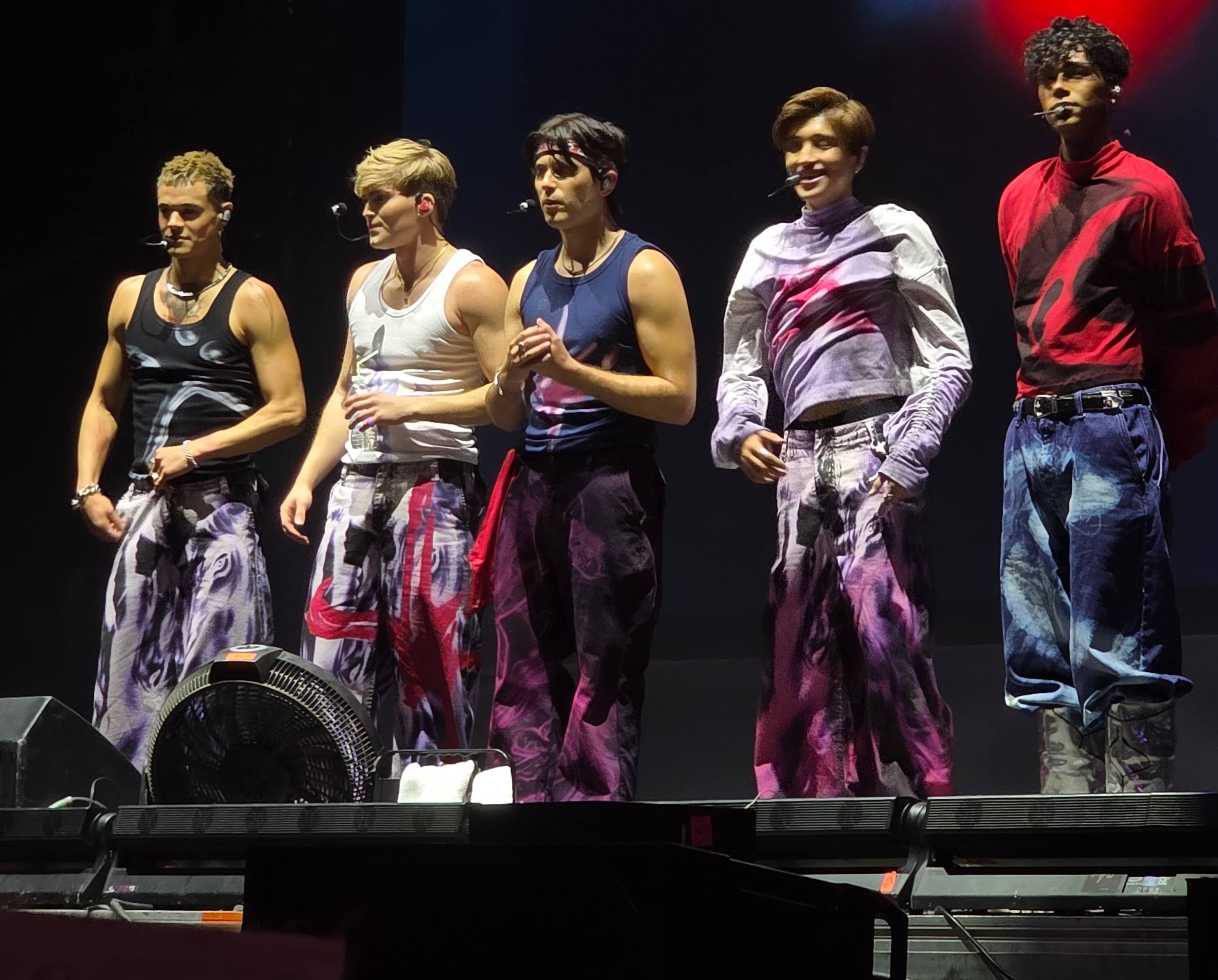
- Santos Bravos in May 2026; Left to right: Drew Venegas, Gabi Bermúdez, Alejandro Aramburú, Kenneth Lavíll, and Kauê Penna

Background information
- Origin: Mexico City, Mexico
- Genre: Latin pop
- Years active: 2025–present
- Labels: Hybe Latin America; TRU Records
- Members: Alejandro Aramburú; Drew Venegas; Gabi Bermúdez; Kauê Penna; Kenneth Lavíll
- Website: santosbravos.com

Santos Bravos is a Latin American boy band based in Mexico City, consisting of five members: Alejandro Aramburú, Drew Venegas, Gabi Bermúdez, Kauê Penna, and Kenneth Lavíll. With members from Peru, the United States, Puerto Rico, Brazil, and Mexico, the group was formed through its 2025 self-titled reality series. The group is under Hybe Latin America's sub-label TRU Records, described as South Korean entertainment company Hybe's first Latin pop label. Santos Bravos debuted on October 21, 2025, with the single "0%" and later released their first extended play (EP), Dual, on March 13, 2026.

== History ==
=== Formation and debut ===
Santos Bravos was formed in 2025 by Hybe Latin America through a self-titled reality series aimed at creating a Latin pop boy band. The project brought contestants from Latin American countries and the United States, who underwent a structured selection process that included vocal, dance, and performance evaluations, as well as group challenges designed to assess chemistry and versatility. Throughout the series, the participants received training and mentorship under the direction of Hybe Latin America, following a development model similar to other idol survival programs. At the conclusion of the competition, five members—Alejandro Aramburú, Drew Venegas, Gabi Bermúdez, Kauê Penna, and Kenneth Lavíll—were selected to form the final lineup, marking the launch of Hybe Latin America's first idol group.

On October 21, 2025, Santos Bravos made their official debut during a concert at the Auditorio Nacional in Mexico City, which also served as the final episode of the competition series. During the event, the finalists performed a selection of songs developed throughout the training period, including covers and original material. The group then performed their debut single, "0%", marking their first appearance as an official recording and performing act. The single "0%" was released on the day of the group's debut, and its music video, filmed in Mexico City, was released on December 18. Ha Yu-Mi of K-en News described the track as "a high-tempo Latin pop song layered with pulsing beats, bold basslines, slick electronic sounds, and an addictive chorus."

On November 25, a Brazilian Portuguese version of "0%" was released.

=== 2026–present: Dual ===
On January 23, 2026, Santos Bravos performed "0%" at Willy Chavarria's Paris Fashion Week show, wearing pieces from Chavarria's collaboration with Adidas. On January 30, Santos Bravos released the single "Kawasaki". The members described the song as offering a different perspective than their debut single, with Kenneth characterizing it as "very energetic, having a more powerful vibe, and more dance-oriented." (Note: Spanish: "Muy energética, con una vibe más brava, con más potencia, más para bailar.") The song's lyrics are in Spanish, Portuguese, and English. The group subsequently released a choreography-focused performance video and a music video for the song.

Santos Bravos first performed "Kawasaki" live on February 19 at the 2026 Lo Nuestro Awards, where they were nominated for Male New Artist of the Year. A remix of "Kawasaki" with Japanese group &Team was released on February 20. The remix, which added Japanese lyrics, featured four of &TEAM's nine members.

On March 13, Santos Bravos released their first extended play (EP) Dual, with six tracks, including four new songs. They also launched the documentary series detrás de Dual ('Behind Dual'), releasing weekly episodes on Spotify and YouTube. The series showcases the group's journey from their debut to the creation of their EP. In late March, they began a collaboration with clothing brand H&M titled Los Favoritos de Santos Bravos ('Santos Bravos' Favorites'). Through the collaboration, the brand's Mexican website has an online storefront identifying the members' favorite clothing items for the season.

In April, Santos Bravos traveled to South Korea to promote and perform on music shows. The group also appeared in the YouTube documentary series URI (우리): Our Family, which followed their Korean promotions and personal moments together.

In June 2026, Santos Bravos released several collaborations and additional DUAL-era projects. On June 5, they released a remix of "Boompala" by Le Sserafim. The deluxe edition of Dual followed on June 12, including additional short audio-message style tracks and alternate versions such as "Wow (Math Pop Remix)", "0% (Live from Festival Estéreo Picnic)", and "Fe (Alejandro Demo)". On June 17, the group released "It's Me x Kawasaki" with Illit, followed by a remix of BoyNextDoor's "Viral" on June 21. Dual debuted at number 17 on the Billboard Top Latin Pop Albums chart for the week of June 27, marking Santos Bravos' first entry on a United States Billboard chart. On June 28, Santos Bravos appeared at the FIFA Fan Festival Monterrey at Parque Fundidora as invited guests of Enrique Iglesias. The group opened the event and later joined Iglesias on stage. The event drew a crowd of more than 110,000 people, making it the largest audience to which Santos Bravos had performed. On June 30, Santos Bravos partnered with H&M again for a summer edition of Los favoritos de Santos Bravos. The campaign featured a selection of men's clothing curated by the group, highlighting their favorite styles from H&M's summer season.

On July 10, Hybe Latin America announced ¡Vamos, Bravos!, Santos Bravos' first original variety show and the company's first K-pop-style variety program produced primarily in Spanish. The series premiered on July 14, with weekly releases of new episodes.

In August 2026, Santos Bravos made their debut appearance at KCON in Los Angeles. On August 18, the group continued their partnership with H&M through Santos Bravos x H&M: Live in L.A., a concert livestreamed from Los Angeles through H&M's official YouTube channel.

In September 2026, Santos Bravos attended the 2026 Premios Juventud in Marbella, Spain. The group won both categories in which they were nominated: Favorite Group or Duo of the Year and New Generation – Male Artist. At the ceremony, they performed "Velocidade". Also in September, Santos Bravos participated in "Es Latina", a cultural and musical program created around the Madrid dates of Shakira's Las Mujeres Ya No Lloran World Tour. On September 29, Santos Bravos and Enhypen released "Bloody Paradise x Velocidade (PETERBLUE Remix)", a mashup produced by PETERBLUE and accompanied by an official visualizer.

After teasing a collaboration with Enrique Iglesias on October 3, Santos Bravos announced Ooh Laka Laka La on October 5 and released the bilingual English- and Spanish-language single on October 9. The song followed their shared performance at the Monterrey FIFA Fan Festival earlier in the year. Also on October 9, Billboard featured the group in its Latin Power Players coverage of Hybe Americas executives Isaac Lee and Juan S. Arenas, noting their Premio Lo Nuestro nomination, two Premios Juventud wins, and Premio Tu Música Urbano recognition. On October 16, Santos Bravos appeared at KOOM LIVE 2026 at Terminal 5 in New York City. Organized by United Korean Founders as part of KOOM Week, the concert marked the group's first performance in New York City. Additionally, Santos Bravos confirmed to make their debut on the Billboard Latin Music Awards stage during the October 22 ceremony at the James L. Knight Center in Miami. On October 19, Santos Bravos officially announced their first comeback through Weverse, confirming that a new single would be released on November 20, 2026. The announcement featured a monochromatic teaser depicting a silhouetted hand reaching toward an origami crane, accompanied by the text "NOV. 20, 2026 COMEBACK".

== Members ==
- Drew Venegas – leader
- Alejandro Aramburú
- Gabi Bermúdez
- Kauê Penna
- Kenneth Lavíll

== Discography ==
=== Extended plays ===
Title	Details
Dual	Released: March 13, 2026; Label: Hybe Latin America; Formats: Digital download, streaming; Tracklist: 1. "0%"; 2. "Wow"; 3. "Mhm"; 4. "Kawasaki"; 5. "Velocidade"; 6. "Fe"

=== Singles ===
==== As lead artist ====
Title	Year	Album
"0%"	2025	Dual
"0%" (Portuguese version)	2025	Non-album single
"Kawasaki"	2026	Dual
"Kawasaki" (&TEAM Remix)	2026	Non-album single
"Kawasaki" (Tropkillaz Remix)	2026	Non-album single
"Mhm" (Portuguese Version)	2026	Non-album single

==== As featured artist ====
Title	Year	Album
"Boompala" (Remix) (Le Sserafim featuring Santos Bravos)	2026	Non-album single
"Viral (Santos Bravos Remix)" (with BoyNextDoor)	2026	Non-album single
"Bloody Paradise x Velocidade (Peterblue Remix)" (with Enhypen)	2026	Non-album single
"Ooh Laka Laka La" (with Enrique Iglesias)	2026	Non-album single

=== Promotional singles ===
Title	Year	Peak chart positions	Album
Title	Year	PER	Album
“Velocidade”	2026	4	Dual

== Videography ==
=== Music videos ===
Year	Title	Version	Album / EP	Director(s)	Ref.
2025	"0%"	Music video	Dual	Ferina	
2026	"Kawasaki"	Music video	Dual	91 Rules	
2026	"Kawasaki"	Performance Video	Dual	91 Rules	
2026	"Kawasaki" (&TEAM Remix)	Lyric Video	Non-album single	91 Rules	
2026	"Mhm"	Lyric Video	Dual	Alejandro Bernal	
2026	"Mhm" (Portuguese Version)	Lyric Video	Non-album single	Alejandro Bernal	
2026	“Velocidade”	Performance Video	Dual	Sebastian Coto	

== Filmography ==
=== Reality and documentary series ===
Year	Title	Ref.
2025	Santos Bravos: La Serie	
2026	detrás de Dual	
2026	URI (우리): Our Family	
2026	¡Vamos, Bravos!	

== Live performances ==
=== Festivals ===
Date	Event	Venue	City	Country	Ref.
October 22, 2025	Billboard Latin Music Week	The Fillmore	Miami	United States	
October 31, 2025	Bresh CDMX - Día De Muertos	Fronton Bucareli	Mexico City	Mexico	
December 13, 2025	Stage 92.1	Parque Aztlán	Mexico City	Mexico	
March 20, 2026	Festival Estéreo Picnic	Simón Bolívar Park	Bogotá	Colombia	
March 29, 2026	Tecate Pa'l Norte	Fundidora Park	Monterrey	Mexico	
April 26, 2026	Inkigayo ON THE GO	Paradise City Plaza	Incheon	South Korea	
May 1, 2026	Empire Music Festival	Finca El Jocotillo	Guatemala City	Guatemala	
May 17, 2026	Tecate Emblema	Autódromo Hermanos Rodríguez	Mexico City	Mexico	
June 28, 2026	FIFA Fan Festival	Parque Fundidora	Monterrey	Mexico	
July 15, 2026	CAMPO MARTE 26	Campo Marte	Mexico City	Mexico	
August 14, 2026	KCON LA	Crypto.com Arena; Los Angeles Convention Center	Los Angeles	United States	
September 18, 2026	Es Latina	Macondo Park	Madrid	Spain	
September 19, 2026	Es Latina	Macondo Park	Madrid	Spain	
September 20, 2026	Es Latina	Macondo Park	Madrid	Spain	
October 16, 2026	KOOM Festival	Terminal 5	New York City	United States	
October 19, 2026	Billboard Latin Music Week	Faena Forum	Miami	United States	
October 28, 2026	Feria Guadalajara	Auditorio Jalisco	Jalisco	Mexico	
November 15, 2026	Festival Internacional del Globo	Parque Metropolitano de León	Guanajuato	Mexico	
November 18, 2026	Multiverso Exa FM	Estadio Alfredo Harp Helú	Mexico City	Mexico	
Noviembre 27, 2026	Feria de Yucatan	Recinto Ferial de Xmatkuil	Yucatán	Mexico	
March 12, 2027	Lollapalooza Argentina	Hipódromo de San Isidro	Bueno Aires	Argentina	
March 13, 2027	Lollapalooza Chile	O'Higgins Park	Santiago	Chile	
March 20, 2027	Lollapalooza Brazil	Interlagos Circuit	São Paulo	Brazil	

=== Fan meetings ===
Title	Date	Venue	City	Country	Ref.
Sesión DUAL	May 24, 2026	Duomo Costa 21	Lima	Peru	
Sesión DUAL	May 28, 2026	Cine Joia	São Paulo	Brazil	

=== TV performances ===
Date	Event	City	Country	Performed song(s)	Ref.
April 16, 2026	Bae Cheol-soo's Music Camp	Seoul	South Korea	“Velocidade”, "0%", "Fe" and "Everybody" (Backstreet Boys cover)	
April 16, 2026	M Countdown	Seoul	South Korea	“Velocidade”	
April 17, 2026	Music Bank	Seoul	South Korea	“Velocidade”	
April 18, 2026	Show! Music Core	Seoul	South Korea	“Velocidade”	
April 19, 2026	Inkigayo	Seoul	South Korea	“Velocidade”	
June 24, 2026	Amazon Music City Sessions	Mexico City	Mexico		
November 4, 2026	PaleyLive: SANTOS BRAVOS: DUAL - Behind the Music	New York City	United States		

=== Other events ===
Date	Event	Venue	City	Country	Ref.
January 23, 2026	Paris Fashion Week	Dojo de París	Paris	France	
February 19, 2026	Premio Lo Nuestro	Kaseya Center	Miami	United States	
June 4, 2026	Premios Tu Música Urbano	Coca-Cola Music Hall	San Juan	Puerto Rico	
September 3, 2026	Premios Juventud	Starlite Auditorium	Marbella	Spain	
October 22, 2026	Billboard Latin Music Awards	James L. Knight Center	Miami	United States	

== Awards and nominations ==
Award	Year	Recipient(s) and nominee(s)	Category	Result	Ref.
Premio Lo Nuestro	2026	Santos Bravos	Male New Artist of the Year	Nominated	
Premios Tu Música Urbano	2026	Santos Bravos	Duo or Group Artist	Won	
Premios Tu Música Urbano	2026	"Kawasaki"	Song of the Year (Duo/Group)	Nominated	
Premios Juventud	2026	Santos Bravos	Favorite Group or Duo of the Year	Won	
Premios Juventud	2026	Santos Bravos	New Generation – Male Artist	Won	
DigitELLE Mexico Awards	2026	Santos Bravos	Music & Lyrics	Won	
Tú Awards	2026	Santos Bravos	Breakthrough Artist	Nominated	
Tú Awards	2026	"Kawasaki"	Song of the Year	Won	
BreakTudo Awards	2026	"Kawasaki"	Song by New International Artist	Nominated	
HEAT Latin Music Awards	2026	Santos Bravos	Best Group or Band	Nominated	
HEAT Latin Music Awards	2026	Santos Bravos	Best New Artist	Nominated	
MAMA Awards	2026	Santos Bravos	Best KCON Artist	Nominated	
