= Bae Cheol-soo =

South Korean radio host and former singer

- 배철수
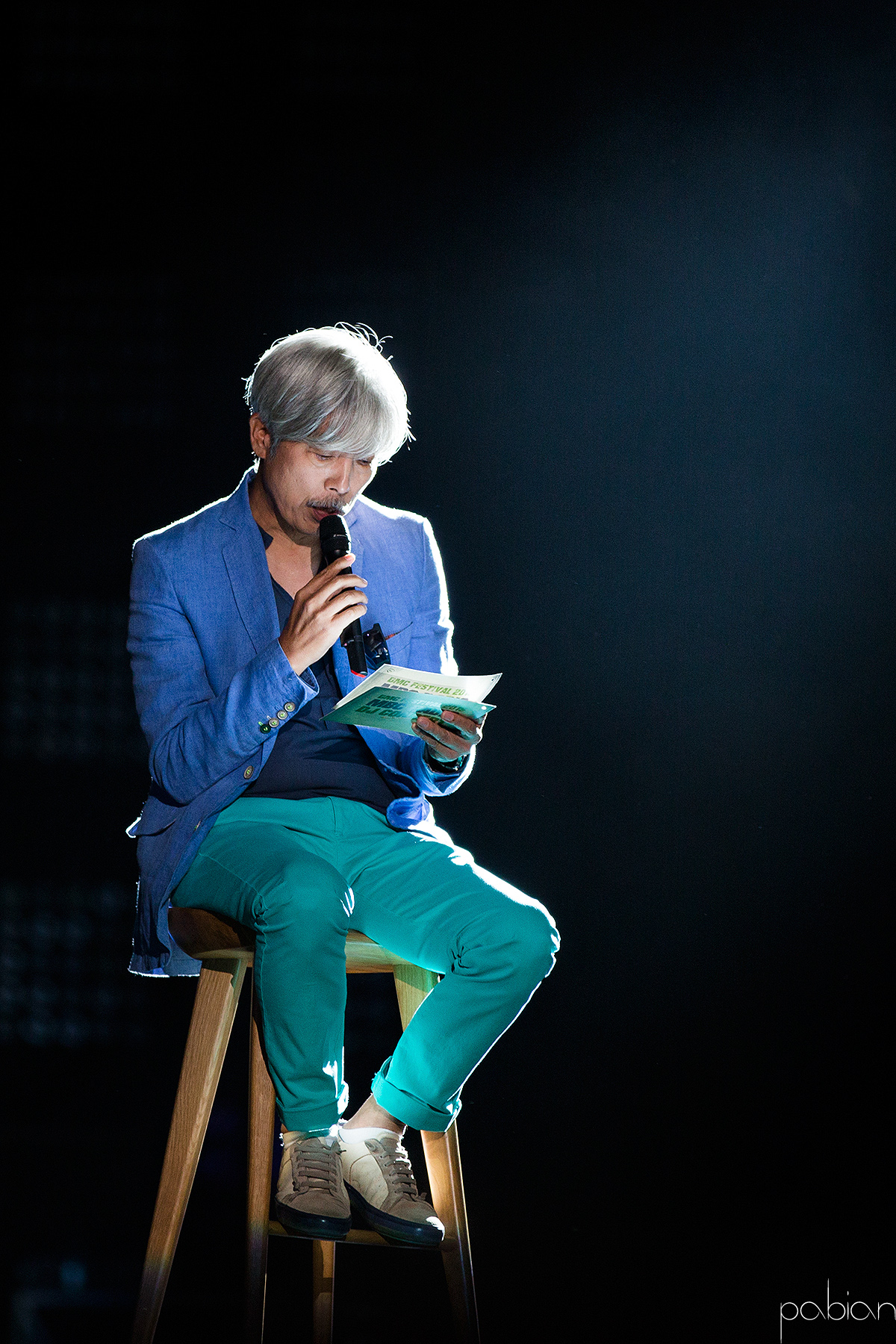
- Bae in 2015
- Born: August 18, 1953 (age 73); Jongno District, Seoul, South Korea
- Education: Korea Aerospace University
- Presenting career
- Country: South Korea

Bae Cheol-soo (born August 18, 1953) is a South Korean radio host and former singer. His syndicated talk radio show Bae Cheol-soo's Music Camp, airs via the MBC FM4U since 1990.

== Life ==
Bae was born in 1953 in Gahoedong, Jongno district in Seoul. He graduated from Korea Aerospace University, and served in the military and was discharged as a staff sergeant in 1977.In 1978 he was one of the contestants as part of the group "RUNAWAY(Also known as hwaljooro)" in the 1st beach singing competition hosted by Tongyang Broadcasting Company, with the song,"I have lived my life without knowing the world". In 1979, he formed the band Songgolmae, where he played the drum and contributed vocals.
