= Ooh Laka Laka La =

Song by Enrique Iglesias and Santos Bravos
- Language: English, Spanish
- Released: 9 October, 2026
- Recorded: 2026
- Genre: Pop
- Length: 2:14
- Label: E.I. Productions
- Songwriters: Enrique Iglesias, Carlos Paucar, Descemer Bueno, Jose Angel Sastre Perez, Javier Durán Webb, Ana Mancebo
- Producer: Carlos Paucar

Enrique Iglesias chronology
"Tamo Bien" (2025)	"Ooh Laka Laka La" (2026)

"Ooh Laka Laka La" is a song by Spanish singer Enrique Iglesias and Latin American boy band Santos Bravos. It was released as a single on 9 October 2026 by E.I. Productions.

A music video was released on 26 October 2026.

== Charts ==
Chart (2026)	Peak position
Mexico Pop Airplay (Monitor Latino)	12
Peru Pop Airplay (Monitor Latino)	15
