= Santos Bravos (TV series) =

Latin American reality series

- Genre: Reality television
- Created by: Jaime Escallón-Buraglia
- Directed by: Alejandro Bernal Rueda
- Creative director: Ruddy Graziani
- Country of origin: Mexico
- Original languages: Spanish; English; Portuguese

Production
- Executive producers: Jaime Escallón-Buraglia; Lucas Jaramillo; Bang Si-hyuk; Isaac Lee; Kaj Jong-hyun; Juan Arenas; Kenny Ortega; Johnny Goldstein; Fernanda Huerta
- Production location: Mexico City, Mexico
- Production companies: Hybe Corporation; Pulso Design

Original release
- Network: YouTube
- Release: August 14 – December 11, 2025

Santos Bravos is a Latin American reality series produced by Hybe Latin America to form a boy band. The program features 17 contestants from across Latin America, the United States, and Spain, and follows their training and performances in pursuit of making the debut lineup. It premiered in August 2025 across several platforms, including YouTube, Spotify, Vix, and Exa TV, and incorporated interactive fan participation through online voting, social media, and live events. The competition resulted in the formation of the five-member group Santos Bravos.

== Concept ==
Santos Bravos combines Hybe's artist training system with Latin American cultural and artistic influences. The series follows contestants' growth within the company's global production model. Hybe Latin America CEO Isaac Lee stated that the project reflects Hybe chairman Bang Si-hyuk's vision, balancing local culture and a global perspective while positioning Latin music for future growth. It has been described as both entertainment and "a new movement that unites music, culture and communities, breaking down borders". The project is part of Hybe's "multi-home, multi-genre" strategy to expand into regional markets. It is the company's second initiative in the region, following Pase a la Fama, an audition program launched with Telemundo in June 2025. That show debuted at the top of U.S. Spanish-language TV ratings in its timeslot, attracting more than 688,000 viewers for its first episode.

== Production ==
=== Format ===
Santos Bravos combines documentary storytelling with a competitive structure. It features 16 contestants from countries such as Mexico, Venezuela, Colombia, Brazil, Argentina, Peru, Spain, and the United States. The participants, aged 15 to 25, were selected from more than 400 auditions. They compete in challenges and training sessions for a place in the final five-member lineup. Mentorship is provided by director and choreographer Kenny Ortega, producer Johnny Goldstein, and vocal coach Raab Stevenson. The production team also includes showrunner Jaime Escallón, producer Lucas Jaramillo, director Alejandro Bernal, and Hybe Latin America's head of training and development, Jessica Kwon. The series is presented through both interactive content and long-form episodes that provide a behind-the-scenes view of the process.

=== Promotion ===
Ahead of its premiere, Santos Bravos was promoted through fan and industry events. Hybe Latin America launched the "Hybe Experience" at its headquarters in Bicentenario Park, Mexico City, on July 17, 2025. Running through October 31, the exhibition served as a preview of the series and a hub for fan engagement, with tickets for the opening day selling out in advance. Additional promotional activities included live music sections with contestants and guest celebrities, behind-the-scenes podcasts, and interactive features allowing fans to participate in lineup decisions. Around the same period, Hybe organized "The Drop," a industry showcase of its Latin American operations that highlighted the show along with its artists and production capabilities. The event attracted more than 150 brand representatives and 100 media outlets.

=== Broadcast ===
Santos Bravos premiered on August 14, 2025, on YouTube, followed by a release on Spotify on August 15, and on Vix and Exa TV across Latin America and the United States on August 16. Live performances were scheduled to stream on YouTube starting August 22. Interactive previews for fans were launched on July 17, 2025, in Mexico City, ahead of the televised debut.

== Group members ==
On October 21, 2025, Santos Bravos held a concert at the Auditorio Nacional in Mexico City, serving as both the final episode of the competition series and the official debut of the new group. More than ten thousand people attended, with thousands of viewers watching the online live stream available across Latin America. Throughout the concert, the finalists who had competed in the program performed several songs that they had rehearsed during their training period, including both covers and original material. As the show reached its final segment, the hosts announced the five members selected to debut as the official group, who were:

- Andrew "Drew" Joseph Venegas – United States, 25 years old
- Alejandro Aramburú Senno – Peru, 21 years old
- Alejandro Gabriel "Gabi" Bermúdez Lopez Silvero – Puerto Rico, 20 years old
- Kauê Penna Forte – Brazil, 19 years old
- Kenneth Jesús Lagunes Villegas "Kenneth Lavíll" – Mexico, 16 years old

Immediately after the announcement, the chosen members appeared on stage together for the first time and performed their debut single, "0%". The final episode of Santos Bravos, "Donde quiero estar", premiered on December 11, 2025, serving as a documentary-style conclusion that links the end of the reality show with the start of the members' careers in the band.

== Contestants ==
Name	Age	Nationality	Result				
Name	Age	Nationality	Result	Andrew "Drew" Venegas	25	United States	Debut
Pablo Carns	24	Mexico	Finalist				
Priano Issad	24	Colombia	Eliminated				
Diego López	23	Mexico/United States	Withdrew				
Heider Moreno	23	Venezuela	Eliminated				
Jonathan "Jonah" García	23	Mexico	Eliminated				
Leonardo Lotina	23	Mexico	Finalist				
Lucas Burgatti	23	Brazil	Finalist				
Iannis Bilblos	21	Argentina	Finalist				
Alejandro Aramburú	21	Peru	Debut				
Alex Mandon Rey	20	Spain	Finalist				
Alejandro Gabriel "Gabi" Bermúdez	20	Puerto Rico/United States	Debut				
Luigi Cerrada	19	Mexico/Venezuela	Eliminated				
Kauê Penna	18	Brazil	Debut				
Patricio Rodríguez	18	United States/Mexico	Eliminated				
Jesús Alejandro "Jesuale" Hurtado	16	United States/Venezuela	Eliminated				
Kenneth Lavíll	15	Mexico	Debut				

== Episodes ==
No.	Title	Original release date
1	"Selección"	14 August 2025
2	"Comienzo"	21 August 2025
3	"Dinamita"	28 August 2025
4	"Lloviendo"	4 September 2025
5	"Imagen"	11 September 2025
6	"Calle"	18 September 2025
7	"K-pop"	25 September 2025
8	"Hermanos"	2 October 2025
9	"Drama"	9 October 2025
10	"Cima"	16 October 2025
11	"Concierto"	21 October 2025
12	"Donde quiero estar"	11 December 2025
