= Tamo Bien =

2025 single by Enrique Iglesias, Pitbull and IAmChino

Single by Enrique Iglesias, Pitbull, and IAmChino

from the album Underdogs
- Language: English, Spanish
- Released: 5 March 2025
- Genre: Latin
- Length: 3:06
- Label: Mr. 305 Records
- Songwriters: Armando Pérez; Bryce Christian Perez; Carlos Humberto Domínguez; Enrique Iglesias; José Carlos García; Mauro Silvino Bertran; Roberto Carlos Sierra Casseras
- Producer: Mauro Silvino Bertran

Enrique Iglesias singles chronology
"Space in My Heart" (2024)	"Tamo Bien" (2025)	"Ooh Laka Laka La" (2026)

Pitbull singles chronology
"Now or Never" (2024)	"Tamo Bien" (2025)	"No Te Hagas" (2025)

IAmChino singles chronology
"Diosa" (2025)	"Tamo Bien" (2025)	"Soy Así" (2025)

Music video
- "Tamo Bien" on YouTube

"Tamo Bien" (transl. We're good) is a song by Spanish singer Enrique Iglesias, Cuban-American rapper Pitbull, and IAmChino. It was released by Mr. 305 Records on 5 March 2025 as a single.

== Background ==
Iglesias and Pitbull had collaborated several times previously, including on the singles: "I Like It", "I Like How It Feels", "I'm a Freak", "Messin' Around", and "Move to Miami".

== Charts ==
=== Weekly charts ===
Weekly chart performance for "Tamo Bien"
Chart (2025–2026)	Peak position
Bolivia Anglo Airplay (Monitor Latino)	6
CIS Airplay (TopHit)	75
Dominican Republic Anglo Airplay (Monitor Latino)	14
Ecuador Anglo Airplay (Monitor Latino)	13
France (SNEP)	100
France Airplay (SNEP)	12
Guatemala Anglo Airplay (Monitor Latino)	13
Honduras Anglo Airplay (Monitor Latino)	3
Lithuania Airplay (TopHit)	33
Mexico Anglo Airplay (Monitor Latino)	4
Nicaragua Anglo Airplay (Monitor Latino)	9
Panama Anglo Airplay (Monitor Latino)	9
Peru Anglo Airplay (Monitor Latino)	12
Poland Airplay (OLiS)	1
Poland Streaming (OLiS)	19
Romania Airplay (UPFR)	6
Romania Airplay (Media Forest)	10
Slovakia Airplay (ČNS IFPI)	48
Ukraine Airplay (TopHit)	78
Venezuela Anglo Airplay (Monitor Latino)	11

=== Monthly charts ===
Monthly chart performance for "Tamo Bien"
Chart (2025)	Peak position
CIS Airplay (TopHit)	82
Romania Airplay (TopHit)	12
Ukraine Airplay (TopHit)	95

=== Year-end charts ===
Year-end chart performance
Chart (2025)	Position
Poland (Polish Airplay Top 100)	8
Romania Airplay (TopHit)	22

== Certifications ==
Certifications for "Tamo Bien"
Region	Certification	Certified units/sales
France (SNEP)	Gold	100,000^{‡}
Poland (ZPAV)	Platinum	125,000^{‡}
United States (RIAA)	Gold (Latin)	30,000^{‡}
^{‡} Sales+streaming figures based on certification alone.
