= Jeong Sun-ah =

South Korean musical actress (born 1984)

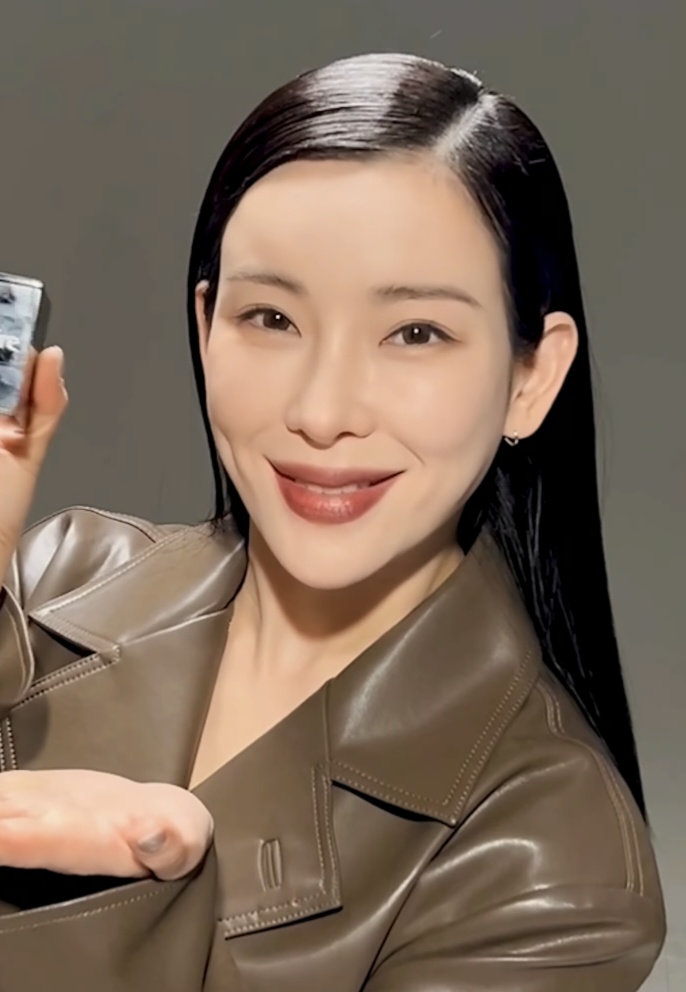
- Jeong in February 2025
- Born: 12 October 1984 (age 42); Seoul, South Korea
- Other name: Summer Jeong
- Education: Dongguk University (Theater and Film)
- Occupation: Musical actress
- Years active: 2002–present
- Agent: Palmtree Island
- Spouse: Lee Han-bit (m. 2021)
- Children: 1

Korean name
- Hangul: 정선아
- Hanja: 鄭善娥
- RR: Jeong Seona
- MR: Chŏng Sŏna
- Website: palmtree.is/artists/jeong-sun-ah

Jeong Sun-ah (Korean: 정선아; born October 12, 1984) is a South Korean musical theatre actress. She is best known for starring in the Korean productions of Wicked, Aida, and Chicago.

== Early life ==
Jeong was born in Seoul, South Korea, as the eldest of two children. She spent her childhood in Saudi Arabia for 5 years due to her father's occupation as a construction engineer. Her mother was a vocal music major.

== Career ==
Jeong became interested in musicals after seeing 42nd Street in her second year of middle school. She took lessons from musical actress Kolleen Park, who suggested to audition for the musical Rent during her third year of high school. She debuted at the age of 18 in Rent (2002) as Mimi Marquez, becoming one of the youngest leading actors at the time.

=== 2022 - present ===
After taking a break from stage due to pregnancy and childbirth, Jeong made her long-awaited comeback with the musical If/Then. If/Then provided her the chance to satiate her longstanding desire to try a piece with more drama. Her performance as Elizabeth Vaughn was widely acclaimed, and she received the Best Actress Award at the 8th Korea Musical Awards.

In 2024, Jeong reprised her association with Wicked by voicing Glinda in the Korean-dubbed release of the film adaptation. The film was released in South Korea on November 20, 2024, and Jeong promoted the opening with a stage greeting event where she performed the Korean version of "Popular" live for audiences. In October 2025, it was announced that she would reprise her role as Glinda in the sequel, Wicked: For Good.

== Stage performances ==
Year	Title	Role
2002	Rent	Mimi Marquez
2002	The Sound of Music	Liezl von Trapp
2003	Urinetown	Little Sally
2003	Mamma Mia!	Ensemble/Sophie Cover
2004	Rent	Mimi Marquez
2004	The Hunchback of Notre Dame	Esmeralda
2005	Gambler	Showgirl
2006	Winter Sonata	Oh Chae-rin
2006	Jekyll and Hyde	Lucy Harris
2007	Tell Me on a Sunday	Denise
2008	Nine	Karla
2008	Xanadu	Kira
2009	Dreamgirls	Deena Jones
2009	I Love You	
2010	Mozart!	Constanze Weber
2010	Aida	Amneris
2011	Mozart!	Constanze Weber
2011	Guys and Dolls	Sara Brown
2011	Evita	Eva Peron
2012	Gwanghwamun Love Story	Yeo-ju
2012	Song of Two Flowers	Yulgok Princess
2012	Aida	Amneris
2013	Jesus Christ Superstar	Mary Magdalene
2013	Wicked	Glinda
2014	Dracula	Mina Murray
2014	Kinky Boots	Lauren
2015	Death Note	Misa Amane
2016	Wicked	Glinda
2016	The Bodyguard	Rachel Marron
2017	Napoleon	Josephine
2018	Anna Karenina	Anna Karenina
2018	The Man Who Laughs	Duchess Josiana
2019	Aida	Amneris
2021	Wicked	Glinda
2022	If/Then	Elizabeth Vaughn
2023	Memphis	Felicia Farrell
2023	Dracula	Mina Murray
2024	Chicago	Velma Kelly
2024	If/Then	Elizabeth Vaughn
2025	Memphis	Felicia Farrell
2025	Moulin Rouge!	Satine
2026	Lempicka	Tamara de Lempicka
2026	Frozen	Elsa

== Filmography ==
=== Films ===
Year	Title	Role	Note
2018	Mary Poppins Returns	Mary Poppins (Singing voice)	Korean dub
2024	Wicked	Glinda (voice)	Korean dub
2025	Wicked: For Good	Glinda (voice)	Korean dub

=== Variety shows ===
Year	Title	Note
2014	Radio Star	Episode 402
2016	Life Bar	Episode 2
2021	King of Mask Singer	150th-152nd King (Baby Goat)
2021	Romantic Call Center	Episode 56
2021–2024	Immortal Songs: Singing the Legend	Episode 575, 592, 615, 645, 653

== Awards ==
Year	Organizations	Category	Work
2008	2nd The Musical Awards	Best Supporting Actress	Nine
2009	3rd The Musical Awards	Best Supporting Actress	Dreamgirls
2010	4th The Musical Awards	Popularity Award	Mozart!
2010	16th Korea Musical Daesang	Popularity Award	Mozart!
2012	7th Golden Ticket Awards	Best Musical Actress	
2013	7th The Musical Awards	Best Actress	Aida
2013	19th Korea Musical Daesang	Best Actress	Aida
2015	10th Golden Ticket Awards	Best Musical Actress	
2024	8th Korea Musical Awards	Best Actress	If/Then
2024	2024 Brand Customer Loyalty Awards	Musical Actress	
