= POPline =

- Website type: News portal
- Available in: Portuguese
- Country of origin: Brazil
- Owner: Flávio Saturnino
- Founder: Flávio Saturnino
- Website: portalpopline.com.br
- Launched: July 2006
- Current status: Active

POPline is a Brazilian news portal dedicated to national and international pop music, founded in July 2006 by Flávio Saturnino. It is regarded as the largest platform of its kind in Latin America.

In 2019, Casa do POPline was launched in Rio de Janeiro and Salvador. The space housed the portal’s editorial office, included dedicated areas for content production, and occasionally served as a venue for concerts by various artists.

In 2020, the brand further expanded with the launch of POPline.Space at Via Parque Shopping in Rio de Janeiro.
