= Songgolmae =

South Korean rock band (1979–1991)

- Origin: South Korea
- Genres: Rock
- Years active: 1979–1991
- Past members: Notably Bae Cheol-soo, Gu Chang-mo (1982-1985)
- Website: songolmae.co.kr

Songgolmae (Korean: 송골매) was a South Korean hard rock band in the 1980s. The band is known for its songs "Accidental Encounter" ("어쩌다 마주친 그대") and "Let's gather!" ("모여라").

== History ==
The band was formed by Bae Cheol-soo in 1979. From their second album, Bae hired Gu Chang-mo as the main singer of the band. Gu quit as singer after the band's fourth album.

== Discography ==
- Songgolmae 1st album (September 13, 1979)
- Songgolmae 2nd album (1982)
- Songgolmae 3rd album "The Moment I Saw You" (1983)
- Songgolmae 4th album(1984)
- Songgolmae 5 (1985)
- Songgolmae 6 (1986)

== Reception ==
Kyunghyang Shinmun cited the band's second album as one of the top 100 Korean albums, praising that the album "completed 1980s Korean rock music". During the band's high times, Songgolmae was the first Korean band to win awards in best teen music and best rock group.
