= Bae Cheol-soo's Music Camp =

- Genre: talk, music
- Running time: 2 hours, Mondays – Sundays, 6:00pm-8:00 pm, KST
- Country of origin: South Korea
- Hosted by: Bae Cheol-soo
- Created by: MBC FM4U
- Original release: March 19, 1990
- Opening theme: (I Can't Get No) Satisfaction, Vienna Symphonic Orchestra Project & Rolling Stones
- Website: Bae Cheol-soo's Music Camp

Bae Cheol-soo's Music Camp (Korean: 배철수의 음악캠프) is a South Korean radio show hosted by Bae Cheol-soo on MBC FM4U since 1990. It has been live every evening from 6 p.m. to 8 pm. and one of the longest-running radio programs in South Korea.

This is a radio show that offered foreign pop songs instead of K-pop. However, the songs of Kpop singers are introduced when they reach the Billboard charts such as Psy's and BTS's.

== Awards and nominations ==
Year	Award	Category	Result	Ref.
1998	MBC Drama Awards	Top Excellence Award in Radio	Won	
2016	MBC Entertainment Awards	Top Excellence Award in Radio	Won	
2024	MBC Entertainment Awards	Achievement Award	Won	
