= Boyish Story =

Studio album by Baby V.O.X
- Released: June 4, 2001
- Recorded: December 2000 – April 2001
- Genre: K-pop; R&B; dance-pop; Ballad
- Length: 55:55
- Language: Korean
- Label: DR; Synnara
- Producer: Kim Hyung-suk; Shim Sang-won; Kim E-Z; Lee Hyun-seung; Kan Mi-youn; Jeong Yeon-jun; Lee Hee-jin; Kim Shin-il

Baby V.O.X chronology
Why (2000)	Boyish Story (2001)	Special Album (2002)

Singles from Boyish Story
- 1. "Game Over" Released: May 21, 2001; 2. "Hope You Were My Love" Released: June 15, 2001; 3. "Dolls" Released: July 30, 2001

Boyish Story is the fifth Korean-language studio album by South Korean girl group Baby V.O.X. It was released on June 4, 2001, by DR Music and Synnara Music. The album sold about 100,000 copies in South Korea.

== Recording and production ==
Seven months after the end of their fourth album promotions, Baby V.O.X. made a comeback with the title track "Game Over" from their fifth album. Originally scheduled to be released in January, the comeback was delayed to May. Each member participated in the production of their fifth album. Leader Kim E-Z wrote the lyrics for the title track "Game Over" and composed and wrote the lyrics for the seventh track, "부디" (At All Costs). While recording "At All Costs", Lee Hee-jin said that Shim Eun-jin first part in "At All Costs" was so sad that she cried during the recording and the recording was stopped. Shim Eun-jin composed the intro to the album, Kan Mi-youn composed the last track "마지막 선물" (Last Gift), the youngest member Yoon Eun-hye wrote the lyrics for the 10th track "To. Angel", and Lee Hee-jin composed the R&B ballad "The One". They said that the reason they participated in the album work was to “get rid of the image of the band competing with their looks”, and that they received music lessons for about 5 months.

== Music and lyrics ==
Among them, "Game Over", which was selected as the title song, is a funk pop dance-pop song composed by Kim Hyung-seok who composed "Yayaya" of the second album, "Get Up" and "Killer" of the third album, and 'Why' of the 4th album. It is a song that sheds the sexy concept that Baby V.O.X. had appealed to until then and showed a boyish concept.

The title track, "Game Over", attempts a natural, boyish concept, stripping away the sexiness and femininity of their previous style. "Game Over" was composed by Kim Hyung-seok, with Yang Jae-sun and leader Kim E-Z contributing lyrics. The group appeared on stage in men's shoes and suits. Lee Hee-jin and Shim Eun-jin, who had long hair at the time, debuted with short haircuts, creating a buzz. In July, they toured seven Chinese cities, including Beijing and Shanghai, and from this point on, they focused on overseas activities rather than domestic activities.

== Release and promotion ==
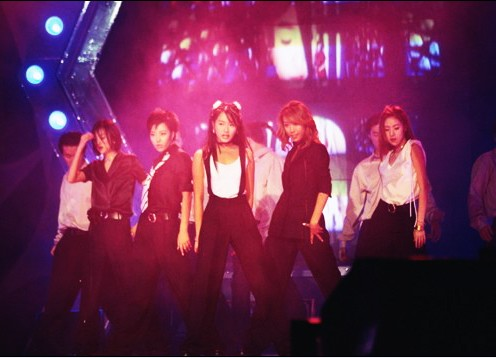
Baby V.O.X. in 2001

On stage, they appeared wearing men's suits and shoes, and Shim Eun-jin, who was playing a boyish character, also transformed into a short-haired style. They started broadcast activities starting with KBS Music Bank on May 21, 2001 and released their fifth album Boyish Story on June 4.

After the end of promotions for "Game Over" in July, the agency DR announced to the press that the follow-up song would be "Close" and that promotions would continue until the end of August. However, the lyrics of "Close" were reminiscent of a passionate love affair, and fan club sites and other sites said that it seemed to "commodify sex". The level is too high, and Baby V.O.X. official fan club "Baby Angels" even sent an open inquiry to their agency DR Music. It has already gone through a preliminary review by a terrestrial broadcaster as "Close". Even after passing the audition, the agency hurriedly replaced the follow-up song with "Doll". "Doll" recovered from the poor performance of "Game Over" and, unlike before, gained popularity among women.

Starting in Shenyang on July 7, 2001, Baby V.O.X. embarked on a month-long tour of China, visiting seven cities. At a time when interest was rising even in Southeast Asia, Baby V.O.X. received minimal compensation for the tour. This was a testament to the growing support of their 50 or so homegrown fan clubs in China. After completing their China tour, Baby V.O.X. embarked on a Japanese tour, visiting four cities, including Tokyo. Japanese concert agencies had already made offers, and all that was left was to finalize the terms and conditions. Baby V.O.X. also established a computer school for children in remote mountainous areas of China, donating approximately 80 computers.

After wrapping up promotions for "Game Over" in mid-July, they were scheduled to promote the follow-up song "Close," composed by Jeong Yeon-jun, from late July to late August. However, the tour was canceled due to strong fan protests over the suggestive lyrics. Ultimately, "Doll," composed by Kim Hyung-seok, was promoted as the follow-up song to "Close", and it enjoyed even greater popularity than the title track.

During their overseas activities, Baby V.O.X. fell victim to a concert scam in China for the second time, following the previous year. Baby Vox had two performances in Shenyang, but were forced to stay there because they couldn't even afford the hotel bill, let alone the guarantee.

Appointed as a Guilin City Tourism Goodwill Ambassador in October 2000, Baby Vox invested in a resort hotel newly established by the Tourism Bureau (a government agency responsible for travel and sightseeing in China, equivalent to a tourism bureau), opening a "Baby V.O.X. Showroom" within the resort hotel.

This showroom featured Baby V.O.X. CDs, concert photos, and posters for sale. Proceeds from the resort were used to donate books to elementary schools in Guilin. Encouraged by the 26% increase in Korean tourists to Guilin since Baby V.O.X. was appointed as tourism ambassadors (making it the city with the highest increase in foreign tourists), the city expressed its gratitude by covering all accommodation and travel expenses and inviting the parents of the Baby V.O.X. members to the event.

On November 5, 2001, various programs, including "Baby V.O.X. Impersonation", were held in the Grand Ballroom on the second floor of the Gyesan Hotel in Guilin. Prior to this, Baby V.O.X. participated in the opening ceremony of the International Tourism Festival held at the hotel on November 3, 2001, followed by a car parade on the 4th and a fan mini-concert on the 5th.

Baby Vox stated, "We have been active in China for the past three years and have become a leading force in the "Korean Wave", but it is true that some people look down on foreigners", and added, "We are actively participating in public service activities in China as a way of investing and giving back as much as we earn". In addition, Baby Vox was defrauded by the planning company, Heerai Arts Troupe (CEO Yoo Jeong-ja), when they were not even paid for the performance or living expenses during the Shenyang and Beijing concerts planned to commemorate the 9th anniversary of Korea-China diplomatic relations in September 2001. However, they kept their promise to their fans by going ahead with the concerts under these adverse conditions, and received enthusiastic applause from Chinese fans.

== Commercial performance ==
At the time, their agency was focusing more on overseas activities than domestic activities, so they released their fifth album simultaneously in Korea, China, Japan, and Taiwan. Last year, their 4th album 'Why' sold 150,000 copies in China, which was practically a million-seller considering the reality of the Chinese market where the rate of illegal albums is much higher, and they said that their 5th album is also expected to be a big hit. "Game Over" ranked high on the music charts immediately after its release, predicting smooth promotions, but it did not gain as much popularity as before due to being paired with big-name singers

== Track listing ==
1. "Intro" – 1:46 (Shim Eun-jin)
2. "Game Over" – 3:31 (Yang Jae-seon, Kim E-Z)
3. "인형" (Dolls) – 3:28 (Yang Jae-seon)
4. "내 사랑이기를" (Hope You Were My Love) – 3:37 (Yang Jae-seon)
5. "Cut" – 3:28 (Jo Eun-hee)
6. "Lucky 7" – 3:37 (Huni Hoon)
7. "부디" (At All Costs) – 4:58 (Kim E-Z)
8. "가까이" (Closer) – 3:35 (Jeong Yeon-jun)
9. "Come to Me" – 3:37 (Jo Eun-hee)
10. "To. Angel" – 3:36 (Yoon Eun-hye)
11. "Puzzle" – 3:42 (Jo Eun-hee)
12. "The One" – 3:53 (Lee Hee-jin)
13. "Go Go, No No, So So" – 3:22 (Kim Shin-il)
14. "마지막 선물" (Last Gift) – 3:54 (Kan Mi-youn)
15. "Game Over" (Mr) – 3:31
16. "Outro" – 1:46

== Members during this release ==
- Kim E-Z
- Shim Eun-Jin
- Kan Mi-Youn
- Yoon Eun-Hye
- Lee Hee-Jin

== Charts ==
Chart (2001)	Peak position
South Korean Albums (RIAK)	8

== Sales ==
Region	Sales
South Korea (MIAK)	90,014

== Release history ==
Region	Release date	Edition	Format	Distributor
South Korea	June 4, 2001	Original edition	CD; cassette	DR; Synnara
China	June 4, 2001	Chinese edition	CD; cassette	DR; Synnara
Taiwan	June 4, 2001	Taiwanese edition	CD; cassette	Avex Trax
