= Why (Baby V.O.X album) =

Studio album by Baby V.O.X
- Released: May 15, 2000
- Recorded: November 1999 – March 2000
- Genres: K-pop; R&B; funk; soul; dance-pop; Ballad
- Length: 44:50
- Language: Korean
- Labels: DR; Synnara
- Producers: Kim Hyung-suk; Shin Hyun-ah; Lee Hyun-jung; Bang Si-hyuk; Jo Eun-hee

Baby V.O.X chronology
Come Come Come Baby (1999)	Why (2000)	Boyish Story (2001)

Singles from Why
- 1. "Why" Released: April 30, 2000; 2. "Betrayal" Released: June 21, 2000; 3. "Consent" Released: November 2, 2000

Why is the fourth Korean-language studio album by South Korean girl group Baby V.O.X. It was released on May 15, 2000, by DR Music and Synnara Music. The lead single Why did well in the Korean Music Charts. The album sold about 200,000 copies in South Korea.

== Recording and production ==
Following the success of their third album, Baby V.O.X., which also sought to expand into the Chinese market, devoted themselves to the production of their follow-up album, aiming to expand into the Asian market. The album had a significantly higher budget than Come Come Come Baby and their previous albums. LG invested in the production cost of the album and the company was able to hire the choreographer for Namie Amuro, Hiroyuki Sakuma, to help with the choreo. The members also got professional vocal training and famous drummer Huni-hoon participated in the songs. The music video, a rare choice at the time, was shot overseas, and was completed in Guilin, China.

From this point on, Lee Hee-jin, who was the main vocalist of Baby Vox, had less screen time, and Kan Mi-youn, who was the double main vocalist for the third album, was replaced as the lead vocalist.

== Release and promotion ==
In May 2000, they made a comeback to the Korean stage after about 4 months with their 4th album, why. On May 2, 2000, they performed the title song "Why" for the first time at the 'Korea-China Friendship Night' held in Guilin, China. On the 13th of the same month, they had their first stage in Korea through MBC's Music Camp.

During their promotional activities, Baby Vox went to Saipan for a special broadcast to film a skin scuba diving session. Unaware of the typhoon warning, they entered the sea, and a member went missing underwater. Fortunately, all members were rescued. While appearing on SBS's "Beautiful Life," they successfully crossed the Korea Strait with swimmer Cho Oh-ryun.

On October, after wrapping up promotions for their fourth album, Baby V.O.X. participated in the "World Beer Festival" held in Qingdao, China, where they performed alongside international stars such as the Bee Gees, Hikaru Utada, and CoCo Lee. They were also appointed ambassadors for Guilin, China.

From this time on, Baby V.O.X.'s overseas activities became more frequent. At the end of the year, they traveled to China for a joint concert with Clon and Lee Jung-hyun. However, they were defrauded and were unable to pay their hotel bill, forcing them to stay in the hotel and almost being unable to return. This incident drew criticism, claiming it was a reckless attempt to promote the Korean Wave. On October 22, 2000, they met with Japanese fans for the first time since their debut. A fan signing event was held on the first day, drawing nearly 300 fans. The next day, a mini-concert sold out all 700 seats, with some audience members even turning up. That year, they received offers from major Japanese record labels, but due to their Chinese activities, they were unable to fully engage in Japanese activities.

== Commercial performance ==
=== Sales ===
The choreography and costumes showcased on stage were well-received, leading to sales of 150,000 copies within two weeks of the album's release.

The title track, "Why", debuted on MBC Music Camp. They began promotions for the follow-up song, "Betrayal", in July and concluded promotions in October. Their fourth album sold 150,000 copies within two weeks of its release.

The album initially sold over 150,000 copies, however they sold 200,000 more copies after Shim Eun-jin went viral for her “death-stare” during the infamous "Betrayal" stage.

=== Lee Hee-jin’s hair ===
Due to the ban of unnatural colors in KBS broadcasting, Lee Hee-jin could not perform due to her blond hair. This significantly hindered the group's performances on major music broadcasts. This is the probable reason for the album getting no music show wins.

== Track listing ==
1. "Why" – 3:28 (Yang Jae-sun)
2. "배신" (Betrayal) – 3:43 (Yang Jae-sun)
3. "회상" (Recall) – 3:37 (Kim Hyung-suk, Huni Hoon)
4. "허락" (Consent) – 4:48 (Lee Hyun-jung, Shin Hyun-ah)
5. "Overlap" – 3:35 (Jo Eun-hee)
6. "슬픈 별에서" (On A Sad Star) – 4:45 (Shin Hyun-ah, Lee Hyun-jung)
7. "Bad Boy" – 3:42 (Yoo Eun-jin)
8. "올가미" (Lasso) – 3:28 (Lee Hyun-seung)
9. "Before Sunrise" – 3:40 (Jo Eun-hee)
10. "Patron^{[a]}" – 3:52 (Kim Nam-hee)
11. "Why" (MR) – 3:28

Notes

- ^{^a} Promotional single for the Korean release of Gundress.

== Members during this release ==
- Kim E-Z
- Shim Eun-Jin
- Kan Mi-Youn
- Yoon Eun-Hye
- Lee Hee-Jin

== Charts ==
Chart (2000)	Peak position
South Korean Albums (RIAK)	5

== Sales ==
Region	Sales
South Korea (RIAK)	155,864
China	150,000

== Release history ==
Region	Release date	Edition	Format	Distributor
South Korea	May 15, 2000	Original edition	CD; cassette	DR
Taiwan	May 15, 2000	Taiwanese edition	CD; cassette	Avex Trax
