= Special Album =

Compilation album by Baby V.O.X
- Released: April 23, 2002
- Recorded: 1997–2002
- Genre: K-pop; pop rap; dance-pop; Latin pop; house; Ballad
- Length: 108:08
- Language: Korean; English
- Label: DR; Doremi
- Producer: Kim Chang-hwan; Kim Yu-ra; Kim Hyung-suk; Joo Young-hoon; Won Sang-woo; Hong Seok; Shin Seon-ho; Kim Jay; Bang Si-hyuk; No Young-joo; Lee Hyun-seung; Jo Eun-hee; Kim Tae-hee; Kim Nam-hee; Kim Jong-suk; Choi Soo-jung; Shin Yeon-ah; Lee Hyun-jung; Yang Jae-seon; Kim E-Z; Lee Hee-jin; Kan Mi-youn

Baby V.O.X chronology
Boyish Story (2001)	Special Album (2002)	Devotion (2003)

Singles from Special Album
- 1. "Coincidence" Released: April 8, 2002; 2. "Go" Released: June 22, 2002

Special Album is the first and only compilation album by South Korean girl group Baby V.O.X. It was released on April 23, 2002, by DR Music. The single "Coincidence" was used to promote the 2002 FIFA World Cup; a special World Cup-themed video for the song was released. "Go" was later used for their debut mini album in Japan in 2003. "Coincidence" marked their first number one hit in three years since their single "Get Up". Special Album is their best selling album to date, selling over 440,000 copies.

The album came with three CDs, one VCD, and a photobook containing pictures of the members. The first CD contains the two new songs plus a non-stop dance mix, mostly of previous singles. The second CD contains another dance mix, and the third CD is a collection of ballads from previous albums. The VCD contains the music video for "Coincidence" plus exclusive footage of the group.

== Recording and production ==
In 2002. After parting ways with Kim Hyung-suk, who had been the producer of the previous albums, they released a Special Album.

== Released and promotion ==
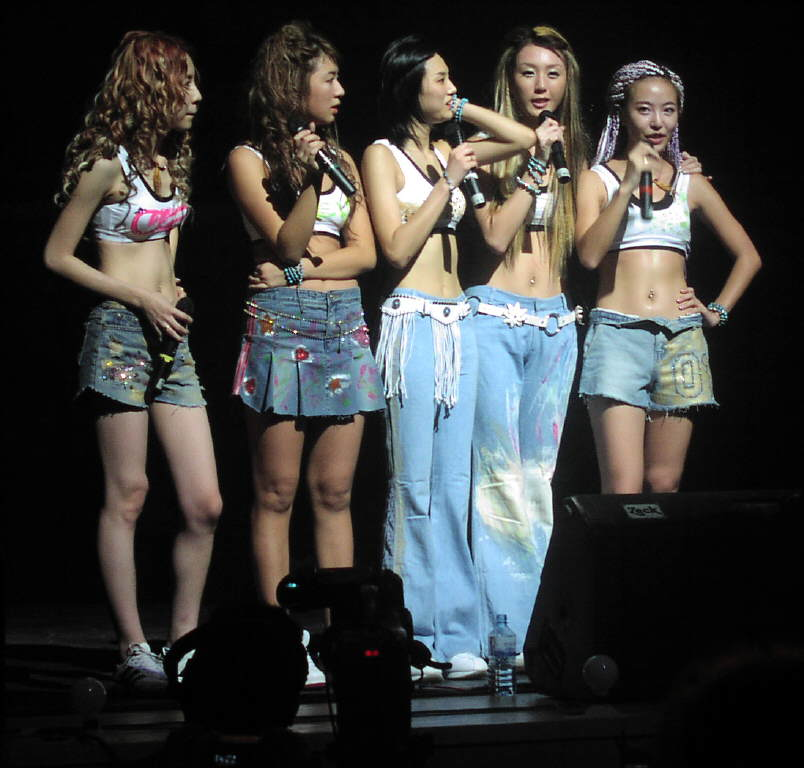
Baby Vox at their solo concert held on August 15, 2002

During this period, the members individual activities became particularly prominent. First, Kan Miyoun transformed into an actress and was cast as the female lead in the Korean-Chinese co-production "Wow", a collaboration between Korea's Movieya.com and China's Marum Pictures. The reason why novice actress Kan Mi-youn was chosen for the 7 billion won blockbuster film was because she showed off her impressive acting skills in the music video for "Coincidence" and because Baby V.O.X. is extremely popular in China. And leader Kim E-Z was cast in the joint drama "Beijing My Love" between China CCTV and Korea KBS. In November 2002, she had finished filming one episode in which she was scheduled to appear, but China, which was scheduled to film more than 80% of the drama, Due to the SARS (Severe Acute Respiratory Syndrome) outbreak, filming was delayed for a full year. During this time, most of the main cast was recast, forcing reshoots two years later in 2004.

After a brief two-month promotion in Korea, they became the first Korean singer to enter the Thai music market, where they received positive feedback. They represented Korea at the Grammy Music Festival held in Pattaya, Thailand, on March 21 and 22, 2003. The Grammy Music Festival is an international music festival hosted by the Thai government. It is an omnibus music festival featuring top singers from Asia, including Thailand, Korea, Japan, and Hong Kong, as well as international stars.

On February 9, 2003, Baby V.O.X. held a solo concert in Beverly Hills, Los Angeles. The concert was part of a Lunar New Year event hosted by KSCI, an American broadcaster with a significant Chinese presence. KSCI was well known to the network for Baby V.O.X.'s popularity in the Chinese-speaking world, and they were therefore the first choice for the event. At the event, which targeted primarily Asians who celebrated Lunar New Year, Baby V.O.X. performed a 50-minute performance mixing their hits with pop music. This marked the beginning of their push into the US market. They also represented Korea at the NHK Asia Music Festival in Japan, performing two songs: "Coincidence" and "Killer". They also garnered attention for singing the theme song for the anime "Platonic Chain", which aired on TV Tokyo in late 2002. The songs popularity soared, leading to the release of a re-recorded EP in Japanese. In late April 2003, they held a mini-concert at Tokyo's Shibuya Live Hall, tapping into the Japanese market.

Baby V.O.X. had been criticized for neglecting their domestic fans due to their focus on the Chinese stage. Despite their pride in being at the forefront of pop culture exports, they were concerned about their domestic fans' reactions. In that sense, the success of their first solo concert in Korea on August 15, 2002, was particularly significant. Baby V.O.X. stated, "The love from Chinese fans is great, but the support from Korean fans gives us even more strength," and delivered a dazzling performance, performing all their hit songs live since their debut.

The overall concept of the concert was "Show Show Show". They were praised for breaking the mold of traditional concerts and creating a "chaotic party", offering a compelling spectacle. The live performance was edited into an hour-long video and broadcast on Mnet, and later released as a VCD. However, due to limited availability, fans living in rural areas had difficulty purchasing the video.

== Legacy ==
This album chronicles five years of activities, from their first album, "Haircut", in 1997, to their second album, "Yayaya," to their third, "Get Up", "Killer," to their fourth, "Why", "Betrayal," to their fifth, "Game Over", and the title track from their special album, "Doll", written and composed by Kim Chang-hwan. The album showcases footage from award ceremonies, music videos, CF filming locations, and even footage of them crossing the Korea Strait, showcasing all of Baby V.O.X's unique songs and history, presented through video and audio. This special album showcases everything Baby V.O.X has to offer.

The original plan was to have five discs: two VCDs, a CD of hit remixes, a CD of unreleased tracks, and a CD combining ballads and dance tracks. However, due to issues such as the CD price, the release was reduced to one VCD and three CDs. The unreleased CD was reportedly slated to include previously unreleased tracks from China and Japan, along with "We Are," the theme song for the Busan Asian Games, and "Last Wish" (tentative title), composed by Kim Hyung-seok. ("Last Wish" went to singer Yaz.)

== Commercial performance ==
The title song "Coincidence (Gloomy Coincidence)" is a house remake of the song "Gloomy Coincidence" (우름한 억언), which was a hit by the group Kola in the mid-1990s, infused with Baby V.O.X.'s signature style and Kang Won-rae of Clon was in charge of the choreography, which became a hot topic. It ranked 3rd on the music charts in just one week after its release, and won 1st place on SBS Inkigayo for 2 consecutive weeks. In June 2002, it swept the top spots on various music shows, enjoying immense popularity. After the release of their third album in 1999, Baby Vox entered their second heyday, and enjoyed even greater popularity when "Coincidence" was chosen as the World Cup cheering song. Thanks to this popularity, it was also used as a promotional song for the presidential election that year, and was appointed as the promotional ambassador for the 2002 World Cup. and Chiwoomi was appointed as the promotional ambassador for the 2002 World Cup.

Starting in early May, they promoted a Latin remix of "Coincidence," which was included on their 2007 best-of album in Thailand.

== Accolades ==
Awards for Special Album
Award ceremony	Year	Category	Nominee / work	Result	Ref.
Chinese Radio Broadcasting Association	2002	Best Hallyu Artist Award	Baby Vox	Won	
Golden Disc Awards	2002	Popularity Award	"Coincidence" (우연)	Won	
KBS Music Awards	2002	Singer of the Year Award	Baby Vox	Won	
SBS Gayo Daejeon	2002	Main Award (Bonsang)	Baby Vox	Won	
Seoul Music Awards	2002	Hallyu Award	Baby Vox	Won	
Seoul Music Awards	2002	Popularity Award	Baby Vox	Won	

Music program awards
Song	Program	Date
"Coincidence"	Inkigayo	June 9, 2002
"Coincidence"	Inkigayo	June 16, 2002

== Track listing ==
Adapted from album notes (Singapore version).

Disc 1 — New Songs + Non-Stop Dance Mix
No.	Title	Writer(s)	Producer(s)	Length
1.	"우연 (우울한 우연)^{[a]}" (Coincidence (Gloomy Coincidence))	Kim Chang-hwan	Kim Chang-hwan	3:59
2.	"Go"	Kim Yu-ra	Kim Yu-ra	4:15
3.	"Intro"			1:20
4.	"배신" (Betrayal)	Yang Jae-seon	Kim Hyung-suk	1:14
5.	"Game Over"	Yang Jae-seon; Kim E-Z	Kim Hyung-suk	1:30
6.	"야야야" (Ya Ya Ya)	Kim Hyung-suk; Yeo Jeong-yoon	Kim Hyung-suk	1:35
7.	"Get Up"	Park Jin-young; Seo Yoon-gyeong	Kim Hyung-suk	2:12
8.	"Killer"	Kim Jong-suk	Kim Hyung-suk	1:40
9.	"Why"	Yang Jae-seon	Kim Hyung-suk	1:07
10.	"Change"	Kim Tae-hee	Joo Young-hoon	2:00
11.	"머리하는 날" (Haircut)	Han Kyeong-hye	Won Sang-woo	2:00
12.	"인형" (Doll)	Yang Jae-seon	Kim Hyung-suk	2:04
13.	"Love and Extasy"	Won Sang-woo	Hong Seok	1:00
14.	"비밀" (Secret)	Kim Yong-ho	Shin Seon Ho; Kim Jay	2:27

Disc 2 — Non-Stop Dance Mix
No.	Title	Writer(s)	Producer(s)	Length
1.	"Intro"			3:59
2.	"Cut"	Jo Eun-hee	Shim Sang-won	2:42
3.	"회상" (Reminiscence)	Kim Hyung-suk; Huni Hoon	Kim Hyung-suk	1:54
4.	"사랑해요" (I Love You)	Kim Jong-suk	Bang Si-hyuk	1:34
5.	"Mask"	Kim Nam-hee	Hong Seok; No Young-joo	2:16
6.	"Bad Boy"	Yoo Eun-jin	Bang Si-hyuk	2:29
7.	"Come to Me"	Yang Jae-seon	Kim Hyung-suk	2:38
8.	"Lucky 7"	Huni Hoon	Lee Hyun-seung	1:40
9.	"Puzzle"	Jo Eun Hee	Kim Hyung-suk	1:38
10.	"올가미" (Lasso)	Lee Hyun-seung	Jo Eun-hee	2:07
11.	"Summer Story"	No Young-joo	Kim Tae-hee	1:42
12.	"패자부활전" (Consolation Match)	Joo Young-hoon	Kim Nam-hee	2:01
13.	"Love and Extasy"	Won Sang-woo	Hong Seok	1:52
14.	"꽃무늬 비키니" (Floral Bikini)	Kim Jong-suk	Kim Jong-suk	2:22
15.	"Sugar Baby"	Choi Soo-jung	Choi Soo-jung	1:45

Disc 3 — Ballads
No.	Title	Writer(s)	Producer(s)	Length
1.	"Missing You"	Kim Jong-suk	Kim Hyung-suk	3:52
2.	"허락" (Consent)	Lee Hyun-jung	Shin Yeon-ah	4:19
3.	"Waiting"	John Anonymous	Won Sang-woo	3:32
4.	"Before Sunrise"	Jo Eun-hee	Lee Hyun-seung	3:40
5.	"하늘과 함께한 사랑" (In Love With The Sky)	Kim Nam-hee	Won Sang-woo	3:59
6.	"Lux (빛)" (Light)	Shin Yeon-ah	Lee Hyun-jung	4:04
7.	"슬픈별에서" (On A Sad Star)	Kim Hyung-suk	Yang Jae-seon	4:24
8.	"내 사랑이기를" (May My Love Be)	Yang Jae-seon	Kim Hyung-suk	4:12
9.	"부디" (At All Costs)	Kim E-Z	Kim E-Z	5:01
10.	"To. Angel"	Yoon Eun-hye	Lee Hyun-seung	3:38
11.	"The One"	Lee Hee-jin	Lee Hee-jin	3:54
12.	"마지막 선물" (Last Gift)	Kan Mi-youn	Kan Mi-youn	3:56

Disc 4 — VCD
No.	Title	Length
1.	"우연 (우울한 우연) – Music Video" (Coincidence (Gloomy Coincidence) – Music Video)
2.	"김이지 – Car Racing 도전기" (Kim E-Z – Car Racing Challenge)
3.	"이희진 – 나만의 오리비법 공개" (Lee Hee-Jin – Revealing My Secret Recipe)
4.	"심은진 – Let's Go Squash" (Shim Eun-Jin – Let's Go Squash)
5.	"간미연 – 야채 Family Party" (Kan Mi-Youn – Vegetable Family Party)
6.	"윤은혜 – 놀이동산으로의 초대" (Yoon Eun-Hye – Invitation to the Amusement Park)
7.	"BABY V.O.X 진수성찬 Talk Show" (BABY V.O.X. Sumptuous Feast Talk Show)

Notes

- ^{^a} Thai releases of Special Album under GMM Grammy used the English title "By Chance" for this song. It is also translated unofficially as "Accident".
- "By Chance" (우연 (우울한 우연)), written and composed by Kim Chang-hwan, was originally released by the Korean group Kola on their 1996 debut album Pentatonic. Later, in 1999, the song was remade by the Japanese group COLOR with new Japanese lyrics and new music, also done by Kim Chang-hwan (sometimes credited as KC Harmony on this release). The single included three versions of the song, including a "Deep House Mix" and "Club Re-Mix".

== Members during this release ==
- Kim E-Z
- Shim Eun-Jin
- Kan Mi-Youn
- Yoon Eun-Hye
- Lee Hee-Jin

== Charts ==
Chart (2002)	Peak position
South Korean Albums (RIAK)	6

== Sales ==
Region	Sales
South Korea (RIAK)	240,349

== Release history ==
Region	Release date	Edition	Format	Distributor
South Korea	April 23, 2002	Original edition	CD; cassette	DR; Doremi
China	April 23, 2002	Chinese edition	CD; cassette	DR; Doremi
Singapore	April 23, 2002	Singapore edition	CD; cassette	DR; Doremi
Thailand	April 23, 2002	Thailand edition	cassette	GMM Grammy
