= Come Come Come Baby =

Studio album by Baby V.O.X
- Released: July 21, 1999
- Recorded: June–July 1999
- Genre: K-pop; pop rap; hip hop; reggae; dance-pop; funk; Ballad
- Length: 41:29
- Language: Korean
- Label: DR; Synnara
- Producer: Kim Hyung-suk; Bang Si-hyuk; Hong Seok; Noh Young-joo; Lee Hyun-seung

Baby V.O.X chronology
Baby V.O.X II (1998)	Come Come Come Baby (1999)	Why (2000)

Singles from Come Come Come Baby
- 1. "Get Up" Released: June 30, 1999; 2. "Killer" Released: September 3, 1999; 3. "Missing You" Released: November 4, 1999

Come Come Come Baby is the third Korean-language studio album by South Korean girl group Baby V.O.X. It was released on July 21, 1999, by DR Music and Synnara. The album earned them the Top Excellency Award at the 1999 Seoul Music Awards. The album sold over 200,000 copies in South Korea. The album sold 218,946 copies, putting them next to girl groups like S.E.S. and Fin.K.L in terms of popularity. On August 3, 1999 the group received its first music show win on KBS music bank. Their popularity greatly increased, getting many more opportunities like commercials, interviews, appearances and so on.

== Recording and production ==
In April 1999, an open audition was held to find a new member to fill the void left by Lee Gai. Yoon Eun-hye, then a third-year middle school student, was cast in this audition, ultimately completing the lineup that had been shaky during the first and second albums. With Yoon Eun-hye joining, Baby V.O.X. made a comeback in July 1999 with the single "Get Up" from their third album, Come Come Come Baby.

== Music and lyrics ==
"Get Up" is a funk pop dance-pop track written by Park Jin-young and composed by Kim Hyung-suk. During the first broadcast, Kim E-Z's revealing outfit and leg-sweeping choreography became a major topic of discussion on online communities. The catchy melody and addictive lyrics greatly appealed to the public and became a success in the market.

The song "Get Up" by Baby VOX seems to convey a message of longing and desire for someone to take action and make a move in a romantic relationship. The lyrics express frustration and confusion about why the other person is not approaching or coming closer despite the singer's evident interest. The singer questions why they are constantly being tormented and why the other person hesitates and overthinks things. They emphasize that their eyes and smiles are trying to convey their feelings and urge the other person to come closer. The repeated phrase "Get Up" serves as a rallying cry, encouraging both the singer and the other person to take action and seize the opportunity. It suggests that they no longer want to wait indefinitely and be left with unanswered questions. The phrase "Move Me Tonight" implies a desire for a physical and emotional connection. Towards the end of the song, the lyrics express a sense of urgency and impatience. The singer implores the other person to take them away and not keep them waiting any longer. They want to be with the other person before the night is over, pleading for them to forget any cruel thoughts or words and make a move. Overall, "Get Up" portrays the yearning for reciprocated feelings, urging the other person to seize the moment and embrace the opportunity for a deeper connection.

== Release and promotion ==
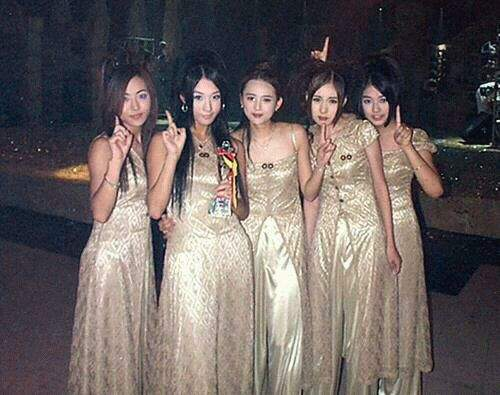
Baby V.O.X. in 1999

On August 3, 1999, less than three weeks after the album's release, the group won first place on KBS's Music Bank for the first time in two years since their debut.

During the promotion of "Get Up", controversy arose over the lyricist. Some broadcasting stations listed the lyricist as "Seo Yoon-jung", while Baby V.O.X.'s interview introduced it as "Park Jin-young", sparking a debate among netizens. Ultimately, Baby V.O.X. claimed that Park Jin-young had registered the copyright under his wife, Seo Yoon-jung, and that the actual lyrics were written by Park Jin-young.

The follow-up song "Killer" ranked 7th on SBS Inkigayo just two weeks after its release and quickly gained popularity, reaching 1st place on SBS Inkigayo and KM Show Music Tank, solidifying their position as a top girl group by ranking first for three weeks. At the time, Baby V.O.X.’s popularity was so high that it was difficult to secure a schedule. In the winter after finishing their "Killer" promotions, they released the ballad song "Missing You", which also achieved excellent results by entering the top 10 of the music charts, successfully completing promotions for their third album. Their third album was a monumental achievement, establishing them as another popular girl group, following S.E.S. and Fin.K.L. During this period, they signed four advertising contracts, including one for the ice cream brand "Wa" and the hamburger brand "Hardy's," and served as promotional ambassadors for the Korean-Japanese joint animation "Gundress". In December, they began their overseas activities, announcing their entry into China.

== Commercial performance ==
After completing promotions for their third album, they signed a licensing agreement with a Chinese record label and released the album in China. They officially entered the Chinese market in December, beginning promotions for the third album "Come Come Come Baby"

== Accolades ==
Awards for Come Come Come Baby
Award ceremony	Year	Category	Nominee / work	Result	Ref.
KBS Music Awards	1999	Singer of the Year Award	Baby Vox	Won	
MBC Gayo Daejejeon	1999	Top Popular Artist	Baby Vox	Won	
MBC Gayo Daejejeon	1999	Top 10 Singers Award	Baby Vox	Won	
Seoul Music Awards	1999	Main Award (Bonsang)	Baby Vox	Won	

Music program awards
Song	Program	Date
"Get Up"	Music Bank	August 3, 1999
"Killer"	Inkigayo	October 31, 1999

== Legacy ==
The album opened the doors for mature, sexy and bold concepts for girl groups. Throughout the 90s and 00s, girl groups were often viewed as ‘less than’ or as a ‘joke’. The fact that most girl groups at that time were mainly cute and innocent, often having male rappers featuring on their songs. Baby V.O.X was greatly criticized for rapping, but never stopped. The title song "Get Up", has been covered many times by groups like Brave Girls, Weki Meki, Blackswan and KAACHI. Melon chart ranked it 38 on the greatest K-pop songs of all time.

== Censorship ==
The music video for "Get Up" was seemingly pulled of broadcast due to the videos sexual content. However, there seems to be no surviving article that confirms that it was actually banned. The only evidence is mentions by Baby V.O.X. and the 2 different music videos.

== Anti-fans and hate train ==
It was in 1999 that the massive hate train towards Baby V.O.X started. "There will be a separate article dedicated to their anti fans".

== Track listing ==
1. "Intro" – 1:19
2. "Get Up" – 3:37 (Park Jin Young, Seo Yoon-gyeong)
3. "Missing You" – 3:52 (Kim Jong-sook)
4. "Killer" – 3:43 (Kim Jong-sook)
5. "꽃무늬 비키니" (Floral Bikini) – 3:33 (Kim Jong-sook)
6. "사랑해요" (I Love You) – 3:28 (Kim Jong-sook)
7. "Mask" – 3:07 (Kim Nam-hee)
8. "하늘과 함께한 사랑" (In Love With The Sky) – 3:59 (Kim Nam-hee)
9. "Summer Story" – 3:42 (Kim Nam-hee)
10. "웃어요" (Smile) – 3:30 (Heo In-chang)
11. "Love and Ecstasy" – 4:02 (Won Sang-woo)
12. "Get Up" (MR) – 3:37

Notes

- Cover of the original sung by Kim Hyun Sung on Kim Hyun Sung 2nd Solo Album.

== Personnel ==
- Kim E-Z
- Shim Eun-Jin
- Kan Mi-Youn
- Yoon Eun-Hye
- Lee Hee-Jin

== Charts ==
Chart (1999)	Peak position
South Korean Albums (RIAK)	5

== Release history ==
Region	Release date	Edition	Format	Distributor
South Korea	July 21, 1999	Original edition	CD; cassette	DR
China	December 1999	Chinese edition	CD; cassette	DR
Taiwan	2001	Taiwanese edition	CD	Avex Trax
