= Ride West =

Studio album by Baby V.O.X
- Released: April 16, 2004
- Recorded: 2003–2004
- Genres: K-pop; dance-pop; hip-hop; Ballad
- Length: 49:14
- Languages: English; Korean; Chinese; Japanese
- Labels: DR; EMI
- Producers: One God; Kim Shin-il; Floss P; Kim Yu-ra; Larry Feng

Baby V.O.X chronology
Devotion (2003)	Ride West (2004)

Singles from Ride West
- 1. "Xcstasy" Released: December 31, 2003; 2. "Play Remix" Released: April 17, 2004

Ride West is the seventh and final studio album by South Korean girl group Baby V.O.X. It was released on April 16, 2004 by DR Music and EMI. It was the last album before the group officially disbanded and it has sold over 80,000 copies.

== Recording and production ==
While preparing for their seventh album, Bungalow Music, which owns a number of hip-hop musicians, was monitoring MTV and Channel V to find Asian artists. This is when they became aware of Baby V.O.X., which had previously topped the charts in the Greater China region and was also popular in Hong Kong, Thailand, and Taiwan. Late last year, Bungalow Music sent a representative to Korea to observe Baby V.O.X. once again through the year-end music awards ceremony and SBS Inkigayo. After that, they proposed that Baby V.O.X. enter the US music market and sign a contract with DR Music, who will be in charge of producing the entire album. Jennifer Lopez participated in chorusing, marking the first time a world-class pop star had sung on a Korean artist's full-length album. The songs were sampled from songs recorded by hip-hop legend Tupac Shakur, with Baby V.O.X. rapping in response to Tupac Shakur raps, and Kim E-Z reflected this in the recording. Recording began in the winter of 2003 and all recording and music video filming was completed in January 2004.

== Released and promotion ==
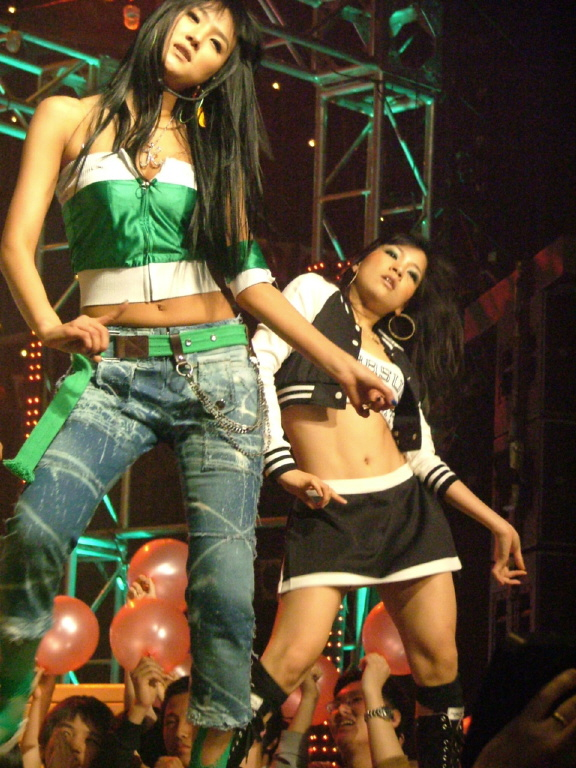
Baby Vox performing "Xcstasy" in May 2004

In April 2004, the group released their long-awaited seventh full-length album, Ride West. The title song "Xcstasy" was rapped by Floss P, a rapper under Bungalow Music, and was scheduled to have its first stage on SBS Inkigayo on the 18th of the same month, but the day before the broadcast, the SBS review office announced that the broadcast was impossible with the title "Xcstasy", and the title had to be suddenly changed to "Fantasy". "Xcstasy" promotions were only planned for two weeks due to rapper Floss P’s other album work, but Floss P showed his loyalty by postponing the album work for Baby V.O.X. promotions and performing the title song for a total of four weeks. Starting in June, they promoted the follow-up song "Play Remix" featuring Jennifer Lopez, and were scheduled to hold a solo concert titled 'Red Saturday' at the Yeomju Gymnasium in Gwangju in July. The concert was supposed to be centered around songs from their 7th album, but it was canceled due to legal disputes with Lee Ha-neul and damage to their image.

In August, they visited Japan to perform on stage at the eve of the ‘2004 Niigata-Seoul Industrial Tourism Cultural Exchange Exhibition’ held at the Nakaoka Welfare Hall in Japan, and held a press conference and mini live stage at the Holiday Hotel in Tokyo, and the Japanese media simultaneously reported on Baby Vox’s visit to Japan. In November, they attended the closing ceremony performance of the ‘1st CAFAIR (East Asia Federation) Expo’ held in Nanning, China in front of Premier Wen Jiabao, and performed passionately on stage. Their participation in this event was at the request of CCTV officials who hosted the performance, and directly demonstrated Baby Vox’s popularity there. Singer Rain and had a large-scale joint concert in Beijing, China starting in December. This concert was not an event-type event but a paid performance. It was the first time in two years since Baby Vox's solo concert in 2002 that a Korean singer received permission to perform, which is unusual. The organizers, Vnet midas and DR china, negotiated with the Chinese government for six months to host this concert, and were able to secure approval for the concert despite the complicated procedures.

== Commercial performance ==
In April 2004, while preparing the album, a large Baby V.O.X. measuring 20m wide and 30m tall was built in front of the 10th hole, an island hole, at Bangkok CC, a prestigious golf course in Thailand. The organizers said that all of this was possible because of Baby V.O.X.'s immense popularity in Thailand.

The music video cost close to 4 billion won to produce, including airlifting cars from Hong Kong and other places to feature the world's best racing cars.

== Legacy ==
Unlike previous albums produced by Korean composers, the group was produced by the US-based label Bungalow Music. Led by producers Floss P and Ond God, "Ride West" features tracks such as "Xcstasy", which samples unreleased rap tracks recorded by American rapper 2Pac, who died in 1996. The album also features tracks like "Play Remix", a rearrangement of Jennifer Lopez's hit "Play", and the R&B ballad "The First and Last". These tracks subtly blend Baby V.O.X.'s signature style with a hip-hop feel, demonstrating an upgraded musicality.

The title tracks "Xcstasy" and "Play Remix" are included in both English and Korean versions, marking the first album in Korean music history to feature both an English title track and music video.

In fact, "Ride West" was originally planned as a 6.5th album (special album), not a full-length album. DR Music revised the decision to 6.5th just before its release, but it was ultimately confirmed to be released as a full-length album. Originally intended as a special album, it contains only six original songs.

The album, aimed at global expansion, including the US, includes songs like "I'm Still Loving You", a hit in China, and the Japanese version of "Go", which was released in Japan. The final track, "Father & I", is from the soundtrack to the film Don't Tell Papa.

== Legal issues ==
=== Lee Ha-neul "Miari Vox" remarks and the legal dispute ===
While promoting their song "Xcstasy", Lee Ha-neul, a member of the fellow Korean hip-hop group DJ DOC, appeared as a guest on the cable TV channel Mnet "Hip Hop the Vibe" segment and publicly criticized South Korean girl group Baby Vox, accusing them of commercially exploiting a deceased person. In response, American rapper, Floss P countered Lee remarks, stating, "I appreciate the criticism. We did our best with Baby Vox's music, but it seems we fell short of Mr. Ha-neul musicality." However, I also believe DJ DOC's rapping merely borrowed American rap styles. It appears to lack a distinct identity. It does not seem proper for a public figure to criticize others by claiming "it is not someone else's work while utilizing their own work." Upon seeing these remarks, Lee Ha-neul subsequently posted a lengthy message on his website slandering Baby Vox and Floss P. In the process, he caused a major controversy by using the sexually derogatory term "Miari Vox," inflicting significant damage on Baby Vox's image. In response, Baby Vox side took a hardline stance, sending an ultimatum to Lee Ha-neul to apologize by June 19. Lee Ha-neul held an official press conference and apologized, stating that his choice of the word "Miari Vox" was a blunt expression even in his own opinion. However, regarding Baby Vox agency, he said, "Think about which is greater: the defamation you suffered or the honor of Shakur you tarnished," adding, "I think the latter is greater." Consequently, Yoon Deung-ryong, CEO of DR Music, filed a criminal lawsuit against Lee Ha-neul. Fellow entertainer Kim Jin-pyo posted on his website pointing out that the incident stemmed from Baby Vox including a rap by American rapper Tupac Shakur in their recent album, stating, "Anyway, I have a feeling Tupac will be laughing a little because of this." Many fans of hip-hop artists also directed meaningful criticism at Baby Vox. Regarding this incident, a music industry insider, Mr. Kang, stated, "Hip-hop musicians attacking idol stars is a common form of "diss" in the American hip-hop scene," adding, "While it feels like Lee Ha-neul is imitating Eminem, the repercussions are expected to be significant given that he indiscriminately attacked a specific celebrity."

=== Tupac Records copyright lawsuit ===
Amaru Records, founded by Shakur's mother, announced that they would sue Baby Vox and their agency to stop the use of Shakur's music and trademarks without a license agreement. In response, Baby Vox appealed against the accusation, stating that "the sampling of Shakur's music was done legally after receiving an offer from a company at Bungaroo Music, the mecca of American hip-hop." They further explained that Amaru does not hold all of Shakur copyrights, so there is no legal issue, and that Shakur's copyrights are shared by several labels including Tupac State and Interscope, in addition to Amaru. They also revealed that they released their last album after purchasing the rights to use music, portraits, and video for the Asian region from Death Row and DTTG last November. Ultimately, the incident was concluded as a mere misunderstanding after it was confirmed that they had legally purchased the music.

== Track listing ==
Ride West track listing

1. "Intro^{[a]}" – 1:04
2. "Xcstasy" (English version featuring Floss P and 2Pac) – 4:12 (Floss P, One God^{[b]})
3. "Xcstasy" (Korean version featuring Floss P and 2Pac) – 4:11 (Kim Shin-il)
4. "Xcstasy" (remix featuring Floss P and 2Pac) – 4:20
5. "Play Remix" (English version featuring Jennifer Lopez) – 3:29 (Anders Bagge, Arnthor Birgisson, Christina Milian, Cory Rooney)
6. "Play Remix" (Korean version featuring Jennifer Lopez) – 3:29 (Anders Bagge, Arnthor Birgisson, Christina Milian, Cory Rooney)
7. "Play Remix" (extended version featuring Jennifer Lopez) – 3:58 (Anders Bagge, Arnthor Birgisson, Christina Milian, Cory Rooney)
8. "The First and Last" – 4:44 (One God)
9. "Move Your Body" – 3:38 (One God)
10. "I Want You Back" – 3:44 (One God)

Ride West – Bonus tracks

1. "I'm Still Loving You" (Chinese version) – 4:30 (Fairy Jie)
2. "Go" (Japanese version) – 4:17 (Kim Yu-ra)
3. "O.S.T (Father & I)" – 3:38

Notes

- ^{^a} Additional credits: Scratches by John Doe "K", keys played by One God and Steven Kelly
- ^{^b} Also credited as "Shin Ill aka (One God) Kim"
- This song is a cover of Jennifer Lopez song "Play" with new lyrics and music. There are no credits for tracks 5, 6, or 7 in the album booklet other than "Featuring J.Lo & Daz Dillinger"
- This is the same song from Devotion with a new instrumental.
- From the soundtrack of Don't Tell Papa (2004)
- The album comes in a double DVD case with the album CD and a DVD containing the music video for the English version of "Xcstasy" and the documentary film 2Pac 4 Ever, directed by Jae Lee Thomas.
- "Xcstasy" was retitled "환상" (lit. Fantasy) for SBS Inkigayo to avoid any reference to MDMA (commonly known as "ecstasy")
- The 2Pac rap featured in "Xcstasy" is originally from his song "Can U Get Away" from the album Me Against the World and a scene of him rapping it is featured in the 2Pac 4 Ever documentary.

== Personnel ==
- Kim E-Z
- Shim Eun-Jin
- Kan Mi-Youn
- Yoon Eun-Hye
- Lee Hee-Jin

== Charts ==
=== Monthly charts ===
Chart (2004)	Peak position
South Korean Albums (MIAK)	3

== Sales ==
Region	Sales
South Korea (MIAK)	32,863

== Release history ==
Region	Release date	Edition	Format	Distributor
South Korea	April 16, 2004	Original edition	CD	DR; EMI
United States	April 16, 2004	US edition	CD	DR; EMI
