= Devotion (Baby V.O.X album) =

Studio album by Baby V.O.X
- Released: April 3, 2003
- Recorded: 2002–2003
- Genre: K-pop; Eurotrance; R&B; dance-pop; ballad
- Length: 52:14
- Language: Korean; Chinese
- Label: DR; Doremi
- Producer: Kim Chang-hwan; Shim Sang-won; Kim Woo-jin; Jeon Jun-gyu; Kim Min-soo; Shin Hyung; Larry Feng

Baby V.O.X chronology
Special Album (2002)	Devotion (2003)	Ride West (2004)

Singles from Devotion
- 1. "What Should I Do" Released: January 31, 2003; 2. "Wish" Released: May 30, 2003; 3. "I'm Still Loving You" Released: November 2003

Devotion is the sixth Korean-language studio album by South Korean girl group Baby V.O.X. It was released on April 3, 2003, by DR Music and Doremi Media The group topped the Chinese music chart with the Chinese single "I'm Still Loving You", and placed 3rd with "What Should I Do" which also peaked at number 4 in Thailand. The album sold about 610,000 copies in Asia.

== Recorded and production ==
Following the hit title track "Coincidence," this album was released in collaboration with Kim Chang-hwan. Kim Chang-hwan and his team handled the overall direction and production, and the overall album's tone has become lighter and more popular.

At the end of 2002, S.E.S., which had been enjoying the greatest popularity in South Korea, officially announced their disbandment, and the four-member teen pop girl group Fin.K.L. went on hiatus to pursue individual activities. Baby V.O.X. also had growing opinions that the leader Kim E-Z was disbanding due to drama filming, but as if to deny this, they released their 6th album, Devotion in 2003.

== Music and lyrics ==
The title song "What Should I Do" is a Europop dance song with a fast techno rhythm and synthesizer electronic sounds composed by Kim Chang-hwan. It gained popularity with sad lyrics and exciting melodies. In the latter half of their promotions, they also succeeded in becoming the first female group to win an award on SBS Inkigayo after the introduction of the Mutizen Song system.

== Commercial performance ==
It was released simultaneously in 7 countries including Korea, Taiwan, Hong Kong, Thailand, Japan, and Vietnam, and Korea. It also soared to 6th place on the album charts in just two weeks after its release. And in January, Baby Vox was appointed as the ambassadors for the Global Sharing Movement and donated part of the proceeds from the album to society. The 6th album was also a great success in China, and later became a hot topic when it appeared on an English test paper.

== Release and promotion ==
While promoting "What Should I Do". Member Kan Mi-youn was involved in a car accident while passing through Olympic Boulevard in a van around 10:00 AM for a morning schedule, causing great concern to fans. Fortunately, she suffered no injuries. Then, while on a trip to New York for a concert, a plane was mistakenly identified as a bomb, leading to a terrorist threat. This caused 20 hours of fear, resulting in a four-hour flight delay and nearly disrupting her schedule on SBS Inkigayo. Fortunately, she completed her schedule without incident.

In September 2003, member Lee Hee-jin was returning home after a grueling practice for the musical "Funky Funky" when she fought off a kidnapping attempt by assailants. Passersby, hearing her screams, ran to the scene, and the assailants fled. A witness at the time reported, "As Lee Hee-jin passed by a white Trajet XG parked in a quiet alley, three or four strong young men opened the door and approached, taking out Seung-gang." He said, "I hurriedly snatched her bag and ran away when she screamed and resisted." It was reported that Lee Hee-jin's bag contained a total of 1.5 million won worth of valuables, including checks and cash worth 1.2 million won and a CD player. Another witness confirmed the urgency of the situation at the time, saying, "When we arrived at the scene of the incident, Lee Hee-jin had fallen and there were small wounds here and there". Regarding this incident, the agency said, "First of all, the damage was not serious, and we did not want the situation to escalate, so we did not request a police investigation said.

In September, they performed in Pyongyang to participate in the "Unification Concert" hosted by SBS, becoming the second girl group after Fin.K.L. unfolded. They went on stage wearing crop tops during the joint rehearsal before the performance, but after the rehearsal, at the request of a North Korean official, they changed into different outfits that covered their navels and went on stage. And they held a concert at the invitation of the Mongolian president, but instead of a guarantee, they received an award of merit and each member was given a 1,000-pyeong piece of land and five houses as gifts. However, in 2006, member Kan Mi-youn Appearing on the MBC program Sunday Night, "Let's Play Economy, Beijing Edition," she requested an appraisal of the land she received as a gift from the Mongolian government in 2003, but the result was absurd. Kan Mi-yeon was dismayed to hear that the 1,000-pyeong (3,300-square-foot) land had an economic value of "0 won." The expert who appraised her said, "This land has no value whatsoever. It's only marked as a certain area and doesn't have an exact address, so it's impossible to confirm ownership. Furthermore, all land in Mongolia is designated as state-owned land, making it impossible to exercise private ownership rights. Therefore, the value of 1,000 pyeong of land is 0 won. In the end, Baby Vox was the victim of an international scam by the Mongolian government.

Baby Vox single "I'm Still Loving You", released simultaneously with their sixth album promotions, became a huge hit in China, making them the first foreign singers to top the "Music Intelligence China Popular Songs" program on Central People's Radio, which boasts the highest viewership in China. 'Music Intelligence "China Popular Songs Tour" is a program that ranks singers weekly based on factors such as popularity, radio airplay, and album sales. Music industry insiders celebrated the achievement, calling it "a feat comparable to BoA Oricon chart number one" and "a testament to the pride of Korean singers."

By the end of 2003, Baby V.O.X. had performed 45 overseas concerts in the four years since their 1999 debut in China. Converted to distance, this represents a distance of 901,500 km, or approximately 20 times around the Earth. This achievement earned them a spot in the Guinness Book of World Records, solidifying their status as Hallyu stars.

== Accolades ==
Music program awards
Song	Program	Date
"What Should I Do?"	Inkigayo	June 1, 2003

== Track listing ==
1. "나 어떡해" (What Should I Do) – 3:58 (Kim Chang-hwan)
2. "바램" (Wish) – 3:21 (Kim Chang-hwan)
3. "슬픈 기대" (Expectation) – 4:27 (Kim Woo-jae)
4. "상처" (Scars) – 2:53 (Kim Woo-jin)
5. "사랑인가봐요" (Maybe It's Love) – 3:35 (Kim Woo-jin)
6. "나를 잡아줘" (Hold Onto Me) – 3:45 (Kim Tae-yoon)
7. "Loveless" – 3:13 (Kim Tae-yoon)
8. "눈물" (Tears) – 3:47 (Kim Woo-jin)
9. "거짓사랑" (False Love) – 3:20 (Kim Tae-yoon)
10. "버려진 이별" (Abandoned Farewell) – 3:11 (Kim Woo-jin)
11. 마지막엔 (In the End) – 3:59 (Kim Min-ji)
12. "A.S.A.P (As Soon As Possible)" – 3:37 (Kim Tae-yoon)
13. "우연" (Coincdence) (Deep club remix) – 4:58 (Kim Chang-hwan)
14. "I'm Still Loving You" – 4:15 (Fairy Jie)

Notes

- Alternate English tracklist (from the Thai GMM Grammy cassette edition of Devotion):

Side A

1. What Should I Do?
2. Hurt
3. I'm Still Loving You
4. Wish
5. Maybe It's Love
6. Sad Expectation
7. Please Hold Me

Side B

1. Loveless
2. Fake Love
3. Tears
4. Left Hope
5. At Last
6. A.S.A.P. (As Soon As Possible)
7. By Chance (Deep Club Remix)

== Credits ==
- Kim E-Z
- Shim Eun-Jin
- Kan Mi-Youn
- Yoon Eun-Hye
- Lee Hee-Jin

== Charts ==
=== Monthly charts ===
Chart (2003)	Peak position
South Korean Albums (MIAK)	3

== Sales ==
Region	Sales
South Korea (RIAK)	84,612

== Release history ==
Region	Release date	Edition	Format	Distributor
South Korea	April 3, 2003	Original edition	CD	DR; Doremi
China	April 3, 2003	Chinese edition	CD	DR; Doremi
Hong Kong	April 3, 2003	Hong Kong edition	CD	DR; Doremi
Vietnam	April 3, 2003	Vietnam edition	CD	DR; Doremi
Japan	April 3, 2003	Japan edition	CD	Avex Trax
Taiwan	April 3, 2003	Taiwanese edition	CD	Avex Trax
Thailand	April 3, 2003	Thailand edition	cassette	GMM Grammy
