= Jang Jung-hee =

South Korean actress (born 1958)

- Born: June 20, 1958 (age 68); South Korea
- Occupation: Actress
- Years active: 1983–present
- Spouse: Lee Bae-gook
- Family: Jang Hyeong-il (cousin)

Korean name
- Hangul: 장정희
- Hanja: 張晶熙
- RR: Jang Jeonghui
- MR: Chang Chŏnghŭi

Jang Jung-hee (Korean: 장정희; born June 20, 1958), is a South Korean actress. She mostly plays supporting roles in television dramas.

== Filmography ==
=== Television drama ===
Year	Title	Role
1998	Soonpoong Clinic	Kim Jung-hee
2000	Taejo Wang Geon	
2002	Sunshine Upon Me	Ms. Choi
2003	Briar Flower	Goo Jum-rae
2005	Golden Apple	
2006	As the River Flows	Oh Bok-ja, Cho Su-yeong's mother
2006	The Snow Queen	Go Soon-ja
2006	The Vineyard Man	Lee Jang-daek
2007	Catching Up with Gangnam Moms	Na Eun-mi
2007	Merry Mary	
2007	Ground Zero	Lee Young-sook
2008	One Mom and Three Dads	Lee Jin-nyeo, Choi Kwang-hee's mother
2009	Cinderella Man	Lee Kkeut-soon
2009	He Who Can't Marry	Jang Bong-soo's dental assistant
2009–2010	High Kick Through the Roof	Chorok Hospital's head nurse
2010	Please Marry Me	Kim Jong-nam
2010	Wish Upon a Star	Jin Pal-gang's office supervisor
2012	Immortal Classic	Sook-ja
2012	Jeon Woo-chi	Maeb-ji
2014	Mother's Garden	No-ra
2016	Marrying My Daughter Twice	Cheon Ok-soon
2017	Sweet Enemy	Cha Bok-nam
2018–2019	Gangnam Scandal	President Ko

=== Film ===
Year	Title	Role
1997	Poison	
2006	The Legend of Seven Cutter	Jung Han-soo's mother
2008	Baby and I	Kim Byul's mother
2009	Heaven's Postman	Woo-sub's mother
2023	Iron Mask	
