= Baby Vox (album) =

Studio album by Baby Vox Re.V
- Released: July 11, 2008
- Recorded: 2008
- Genre: Pop
- Length: 35:23
- Label: DR

Baby Vox Re.V chronology
Ogamusegyeong (2007)	Baby Vox (2008)

Singles from So Together
- 1. "I Believe" Released: July 11, 2008; 2. "Crazy (You Drive Me Crazy)" Released: 2008

Baby VOX is the second and final studio album released by South Korean girl group, Baby VOX Re.V. It was released in South Korea on July 11, 2008, by DR Music. I Believe served as the album's lead single. Baby VOX is the only album that features members Oh Min Jin and Park So Ri, following the departures of Myung Sa Rang and Han Aeri the previous year.

== Background ==
DR suffered a fatal blow when two members left in less than a year since their debut, recruited new members Oh Min-jin and Park So-ri.

== Commercial performance ==
In 2008, they removed the "Re.V" label and released their second album as "Baby V.O.X.", but ended their activities with poor results. After this, member Yang Eun-ji announced her withdrawal, and, and Baby Vox Re.V disbanded after releasing two albums.

== Track listing ==
No.	Title	Length
1.	"I Believe"	3:17
2.	"Sexy"	3:26
3.	"Why"	3:22
4.	"Crazy (You Drive Me Crazy)"	3:36
5.	"Permission (허락)"	4:20
6.	"Fake Love (거짓사랑)"	3:21
7.	"What Am I to Do (나 어떡해)"	3:59
8.	"Never Say Goodbye" (Chinese Version)	3:22
9.	"I Believe" (Instrumental)	3:17
10.	"Crazy (You Drive Me Crazy)" (Instrumental)	3:36
Total length:		35:23
