= Yoon Mun-sik =

South Korean actor

- 윤문식
- Born: Yoon Mun-sik; January 18, 1943 (age 83); Seoul, South Korea
- Occupation: Actor
- Years active: 1990–present

Korean name
- Hangul: 윤문식
- RR: Yun Munsik
- MR: Yun Munsik

Yoon Mun-sik (born January 18, 1943) is a South Korean actor. Joong-Ang Magazine ranked him as Korea's most powerful theatrical person. His stage and subsequent film career spanned a total of 40 years, during which he made about 40 musical films and 19 movies.

According to actress Kim Sung-nyeo, "The history of Korean theatrical performance begins with Yoon Mun-sik."

== Life and career ==
Yoon was born in Seosan, Chungcheongnam-do.

== Filmography ==
=== Television ===
- Drama Special Series:
  "The Disappearance of the Member of Parliament" (KBS2, 2012)
- Still You (SBS, 2012)
- Big (2010)
- The Slave Hunters (KBS2, 2010)
- Four Gold Chasers (KBS2, 2007)
- Evasive Inquiry Agency (KBS2, 2007)
- The Vineyard Man (KBS2, 2006)
- Drama City:
  "Scrubber No. 3" (KBS2, 2006)
- Toji, the Land (SBS, 2004)
- Damo (MBC, 2003)
- Person's House (KBS 2, 1999)
- Eyes of Dawn (MBC, 1991)

=== Film ===
- My Love, My Bride (2014)
- Mission Possible : Kidnapping Granny K (2007)
- The Legend of 7 Cutter (2006)
- The Twins (2005)
- Ghost House (2004)
- Show Show Show(2002)
- The Romantic President (2002)
- Public Enemy (2002)
- My Boss, My Hero (2001)
- Volcano High (2001)
- Extras (1998)
- Two Cops 3 (1998)
- Two Cops 2 (1996)
- Rehearsal (1995)
- A Hot Roof (1995)
- Terrorist (1995)
- Marriage Story (1992)
- My Love, My Bride (1990)
- The Dream (1990)
