= Baby Vox Re.V =

South Korean girl group

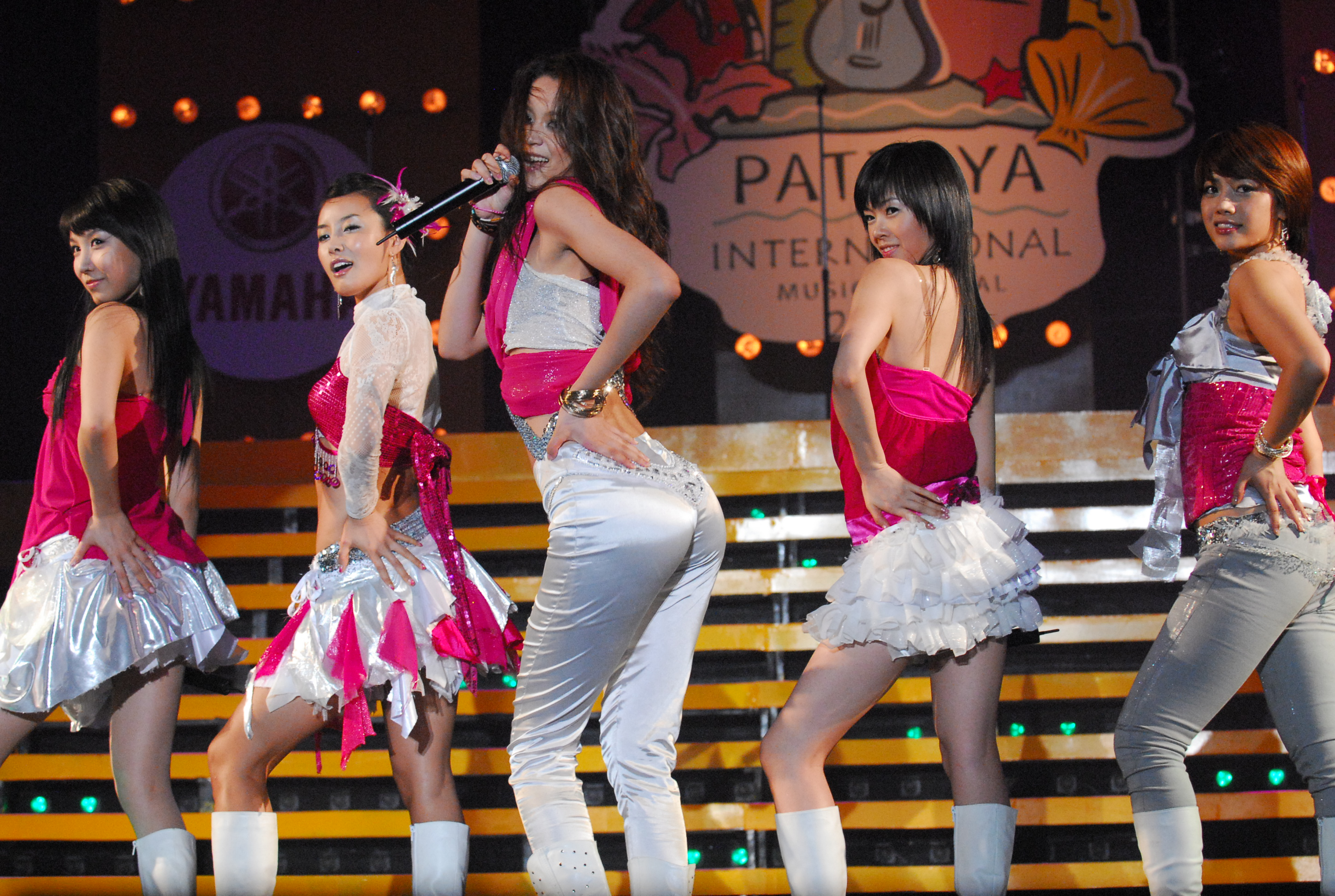
- Baby V.O.X Re.V at the Pattaya International Music Festival in Thailand, 2007

Background information
- Origin: Seoul, South Korea
- Genres: K-pop; R&B
- Years active: 2007–2009
- Labels: DR
- Spinoff of: Baby Vox
- Past members: An Jin Kyoung; Yang Eun Ji; Hwang Yeon Kyoung; Oh Min Jin; Park So Ri; Han Ae Ri; Myung Sa Rang

Baby V.O.X Re.V (Korean: 베이비복스 리브) was a South Korean girl group that debuted in 2007 under DR Music. The group was marketed as being the "second generation" of girl group Baby V.O.X.

== History ==
=== Formation ===
On December 6, 2006, DR Music announced that, based on the results of an online poll of the public, it planned to debut the "second generation" of the label's disbanded girl group Baby V.O.X. The name "Baby V.O.X Re.V" was selected as the new group's name by the public. Later that month, the label unveiled the new group's five members: An Jin-kyoung, Yang Eun-ji, Hwang Yeon-kyoung, Han Ae-ri, and Myung Sa-rang. In January, the group held showcases in Mongolia, China, and Thailand to promote their upcoming debut album.

=== Debut and line-up changes ===
Baby V.O.X Re.V debuted on January 25, 2007, with the album Ogamusegyeong (Korean: 오가무세경; Hanja: 五歌舞世炅; stylized 오(五).가(哥).무(舞).세(世).경(炅)) and its lead single "Shee."

On August 1, DR Music announced that Sa-rang would leave the group in order to focus on her studies. On November 6, during a press conference in Bangkok, it was revealed that Ae-ri had left the group for personal reasons. At the same press conference, two new group members were announced: Oh Min-jin and Park So-ri.

After being appointed public relations ambassadors for the South Korean military, Baby V.O.X Re.V traveled to the Middle East to perform for troops stationed in Iraq and Kuwait on November 26 and 28, respectively. The group continued its international promotions with a solo concert in Phnom Penh, Cambodia, on December 14.

=== Second album and disbandment ===
The group released its second album, Baby VOX, on July 15, 2008. Its lead single "I Believe", is a cover of a song by Thai singer Tata Young. While promoting the album, the group went by the name Baby V.O.X, rather than Baby V.O.X Re.V.

Following the departure of Eun-ji at the end of 2008, the group announced on June 23, 2009, that it would suspend activities.

== Former members ==
- An Jin-kyoung (Korean: 안진경) – (2007-2009)
- Yang Eun-ji (Korean: 양은지) – (2007-2009)
- Hwang Yeon-kyoung (Korean: 황연경) – (2007-2009)
- Oh Min-jin (Korean: 오민진) – (2007-2009)
- Park So-ri (Korean: 박소리) – (2007-2009)
- Han Ae-ri (Korean: 한애리) – (2007)
- Myung Sa-rang (Korean: 명사랑) – (2007)

== Discography ==
Studio albums

- Ogamusegyeong (January 25, 2007)
1. "Never Say Goodbye" – 3:21
2. "Shee" – 3:30
3. "Secret" – 3:44
4. "Baby" – 3:26
5. "Catch Me" – 3:42
6. "Revenge" – 4:13
7. "Get Up (Re.V version)" – 4:05 (Park Jin Young, Seo Yoon-gyeong)
8. "Killer (Re.V version)" – 4:17 (Kim Jong-sook)
9. "Coincidence (우연) (Re.V version)" – 3:57 (Kim Chang-hwan)
- Baby Vox (July 11, 2008)

Singles

- "Shee" (February 7, 2007)
- "Never Say Goodbye" (May 12, 2007)
- "I Believe" (July 11, 2008)
- "Crazy (You Drive Me Crazy)" (2008)
