= The Knitting =

- Hangul: 뜨개질
- RR: Tteugaejil
- MR: Ttŭgaejil
- Directed by: Yoon Eun-hye
- Written by: Yoon Eun-hye
- Produced by: Kim Hye-yeon
- Starring: Lee Sang-hee
- Cinematography: Tae Man-ho
- Edited by: Choi Hee-young
- Production company: The House Company
- Distributed by: IndieStory Inc.
- Release date: October 7, 2012 (BIFF)
- Running time: 12 minutes
- Country: South Korea
- Language: Korean

The Knitting (Korean: 뜨개질) is a 2012 South Korean short film and is the directorial debut of singer and actress Yoon Eun-hye. The film is Yoon's first assignment after entering the Graduate School of Advanced Imaging Science, Multimedia & Film at Chung-Ang University. It made its world premiere at the 17th Busan International Film Festival where it was screened in the Wide Angle category as part of the Korean Short Film Competition.

== Plot ==
A woman is moving her things to move out. A pile of books, diaries, and photographs, all from a cluttered and soon-to-be empty house. She finds an unfinished knitting in a box and tries to finish it, but soon finds herself searching through the veranda when she finds out about her friend's love affair.

== Cast ==
- Lee Sang-hee as the woman
