= The Vineyard Man =

2006 South Korean TV series

- Promotional poster
- Also known as: The Man of the Vineyard
- Hangul: 포도밭 그 사나이
- Hanja: 葡萄밭 그 사나이
- RR: Podobat geu sanai
- MR: P'odobat kŭ sanai
- Genre: Romance; Comedy; Drama
- Written by: Jo Myung-joo
- Directed by: Park Man-young
- Starring: Yoon Eun-hye; Oh Man-seok
- Country of origin: South Korea
- Original language: Korean
- No. of episodes: 16

Production
- Running time: 70 minutes
- Production company: Kim Jong-hak Production

Original release
- Network: Korean Broadcasting System
- Release: 24 July – 12 September 2006

The Vineyard Man (Korean: 포도밭 그 사나이; RR: Podobat geu sanai) is a 2006 South Korean television series adapted from Kim Rang's bestselling book.

== Synopsis ==
The story revolves around the life of Lee Ji-hyun (Yoon Eun-hye), a city girl who wants to show the world that beneath her seemingly ordinary characteristics is an extraordinary girl who will someday achieve great things. Ji-hyun is a striving young clothing designer, who hopes to have her own label one day. Her plans are put on hold when she reluctantly takes up a tempting offer from her grand-uncle. She has to work one year in her grand-uncle's vineyard in order to inherit it. In the vineyard, the challenge of adjusting to country life is made more difficult when she has to learn how to grow grapes under the supervision of the seemingly uncouth and unsympathetic man in charge of the vineyard, Jang Taek-gi (Oh Man-seok).

Amidst conflicts and trials, Ji-hyun and Taek-gi learn to care for each other. As time goes by, Ji-hyun finds herself falling in love with the vineyard and the man in it.

Through the mundane process of grape farming and the personal relationship of Ji-hyun and Taek-gi, this story portrays how beauty and kindness can be found in everywhere when one looks beyond the surface.

== Cast ==
- Yoon Eun-hye as Lee Ji-hyun
- Oh Man-seok as Jang Taek-gi
- Jung So-young as Kang Soo-jin
- Kim Ji-seok as Kim Kyung-min
- Kang Eun-bi as Park Hong-yi
- Lee Soon-jae as Lee Byung-dal
- Bang Eun-hee as Seo Young-ran
- Lee Ji-oh as Lee Myung-gu
- Jang Jung-hee as Lee Jang-daek
- Son Young-choon as village foreman
- Hwang Mi-sun as Han Myung-sook
- Amanda as Maria
- Kim Chang-wan as Lee Hyung-man
- Lee Mi-young as Choi Ok-sook
- Jo Gyu-chul as Ji-ho
- Ok Ji-young as Moon Eun-young
- Choi Myung-kyung as Park Hong-chul
- Lee Sook as Hong-yi's mother
- Yoon Mun-sik as Park Young-gam
- Sunwoo Yong-nyeo as Song Mal-ja
- Lee Dal-hyung as Oh Young-bae

== Awards and nominations ==
2006 Grimae Awards

- Best Actress: Yoon Eun-hye

2006 KBS Drama Awards

- Best New Actor: Oh Man-seok
- Best New Actress: Yoon Eun-hye
- Best Couple: Yoon Eun-hye and Oh Man-seok

2007 Baeksang Arts Awards

- Nomination - Best New Actor (TV): Oh Man-seok
- Nomination - Best New Director (TV): Park Man-young
