= Baby Vox =

South Korean girl group

Baby V.O.X
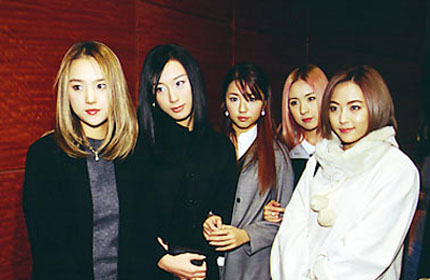
- Baby V.O.X in 2000; From left to right: Heejin, E-Z, Eunhye, Miyoun, and Eunjin

Background information
- Origin: Seoul, South Korea
- Genres: K-pop; dance-pop; R&B
- Years active: 1997–2006; 2024–present
- Labels: DR; Cream; Garam; Synnara; Six Beat; Doremi; EMI; Baby Vox
- Spinoffs: Baby Vox Re.V
- Members: Kim E-Z; Lee Hee-jin; Shim Eun-jin; Kan Mi-youn; Yoon Eun-hye
- Past members: Cha Yumi; Jung Hyun-jeon; Jung Shi-woon; Lee Gai

Baby V.O.X (Korean: 베이비복스) is a South Korean girl group formed in 1997, whose final and best-known line-up consisted of Kim E-Z, Lee Hee-jin, Shim Eun-jin, Kan Mi-youn, and Yoon Eun-hye. It is considered one of the most prominent "first generation" K-pop girl groups of the late 1990s and early 2000s, along with S.E.S. and Fin.K.L, and is recognized as one of the groups at the forefront of the Korean Wave, having broken into the Chinese market. The group released seven studio albums and disbanded in 2006. On December 20, 2024, Baby V.O.X reunited for the first time in 14 years with a performance at the 2024 KBS Song Festival.

== History ==
=== 1997–1999: Debut and early years ===
Baby V.O.X formed in 1997 as a five-member group consisting of Kim E-Z, Lee Hee-jin, Jung Hyun-jeon, Cha Yu-mi and Jung Shi-woon. The group's first single, "Hair Cut", was taken from the album Equalizeher, released on July 10, 1997. The group displayed a style inspired by the Spice Girls, but the first album was not successful because of the edgy concept. Cha Yumi was injured during a performance, so she was then replaced by Kan Miyoun. Hyun-jeon and Shi-woon left the group because of an internal conflict and they were replaced by Shim Eun Jin and Lee Gai. The group adopted a more modest style, used by popular groups such as S.E.S. and Fin.K.L. From their second album Baby V.O.X II, the single "Ya Ya Ya" became a success, reaching number seven on the Korean pop charts. It was followed by a second single, "Change". Following the release, Lee Gai departed, as the agency DR Music had falsified her age by nearly 10 years, leading to controversy when her true birth year was disclosed. She had first appeared with the trio Setorae over ten years before under her birth name of Lee Hee-jung.

=== 1999–2003: Breakthrough years and mainstream success ===
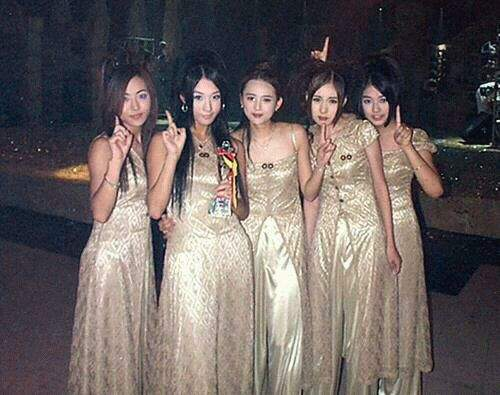
Baby V.O.X. in 1999

In June 1999, Yoon Eun Hye replaced Lee Gai to create a stable line-up. The single "Get Up" was released. For the first time, the group reached number one on the South Korean music pop charts. Another single, "Killer", was also number one and received the Top Excellency Award in the Seoul Music Awards in 1999. The third single, "Missing You", was also included on their third album Come Come Come Baby (1999).

In the years that followed, Baby VOX made a number of appearances in variety shows. After the success of the third album, the group toured internationally, including in China, Japan and other Southeast Asian countries. The fourth album, Why, included the singles "Why" and "배신" (Betrayal), and the group hosted the television program Beautiful Sunday-Cruise to the Korea Strait. The group's fifth album, Boyish Story, was released in 2001 and included the singles "Game Over", "인형" (Doll) and "I Wish You are My Love".

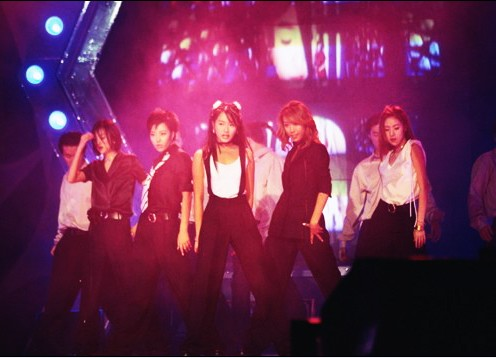
Baby V.O.X. in 2001

The group released a compilation album with singles "우연" (Coincidence) and "Go". "Coincidence" was the group's first number one single in three years. "Coincidence" was re-released for the 2002 World Cup and gained additional popularity. The group held a concert in Mongolia in 2004, the first South Korean idol band to do so. The group also performed in Pyongyang, North Korea in 2003, and was the second girl group to perform in North Korea.

=== 2003–2006: Final albums and separation ===
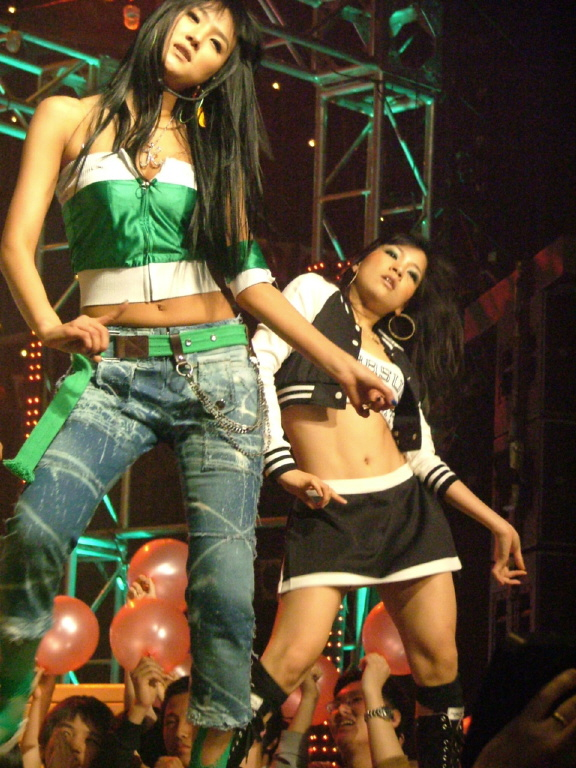
Baby Vox performing "Xcstasy" in May 2004

In spring 2003, Baby VOX released a sixth album, Devotion. Baby VOX topped the Chinese music chart with the Chinese single "I'm Still Loving You" and the South Korean charts with "What Should I Do".

The group's seventh and final album, Ride West, released in April 2004, had songs in English, Chinese, Japanese and Korean, as well as appearances by well-known American hip hop artists such as Tupac Shakur and Jennifer Lopez and the independent rapper Floss P, although Tupac's "appearance" was a freestyle rap that he recorded while in prison. The rights for the sample of Tupac's verse were not cleared, and this resulted in a court case pursued by the rapper's mother, Afeni Shakur. A music video for the album's feature song, "Xcstasy", was made in English and emulated the hip-hop videos popular in the United States at the time. A member of the South Korean hip-hop group DJ DOC, offended by the alleged misuse of Tupac Shakur's lyrics, denounced them in the media but later apologized. The group was forced to abandon the release of the single. A second single, "Play Remix" featuring Jennifer Lopez, was promoted for a short while, but sales were lower than from its previous albums.

Shim Eun-jin officially left the group in October 2004 and Yoon Eun-hye in April 2005. By May 2005 the group was no longer performing, and it officially disbanded in February 2006.

=== 2010: Reunion ===
In August 2010, Baby V.O.X reunited for an appearance on the music talk show Kim Jung-eun's Chocolate, marking their first group activity in six years after effectively disbanding in 2004.

=== 2024–present: Reunion stage and New Baby V.O.X 2025 ===
Baby V.O.X reunited again after 14 years in December 2024 with a performance on the KBS annual music show KBS Song Festival.

On January 17, 2025, according to Osen's reporting, Baby V.O.X would appear on a variety show for the first time in 14 years. On January 23, Baby V.O.X will participate in the MBC entertainment program Omniscient Interfering View. On February 1, during an episode of Mr. House Husband 2, member Yoon Eun-hye revealed that the group would soon release re-recorded versions of some of their past songs. On February 13, the group released the single album New Baby V.O.X 2025, featuring re-recorded versions of "Killer" and "Coincidence". On July 15, 2025, Baby V.O.X announced through their official social media account that they will host a solo concert at the Peace Hall of Kyung Hee University in Seoul on September 26 and 27 and this concert will take place about 23 years after their first solo concert in South Korea.

On March 6, 2026, Baby V.O.X announced they will hold a solo concert at the Pechanga Summit Event Center in Los Angeles on April 25. It is their first solo concert in United States since their debut.

== Style and influence ==
Baby VOX has consistently stated that they were inspired by the Spice Girls, who led the girl power movement in the UK during their early days, and since the late 1990s, they have been the first South Korean girl group to attempt sex appeal by adopting the R&B and pop styles popularized by groups like TLC. The Wall Street Journal described them as "the Asian version of the Spice Girls", and Japan's Mainichi Shimbun introduced them as "expected to cause a tectonic shift in the Japanese music industry". Domestic music industry insiders have stated that "Baby Vox is considered to have laid the groundwork for today's girl groups. They were a girl group ahead of their time, such as the first girl group to hold a concert in China", solidifying their influence. In 2014, Billboard selected Baby VOX as a K-pop girl group you should know.

=== Significance and impact towards K-pop ===
Their first album, which made its major debut on July 3, 1997, contained a feminist message. This was a topic that was unimaginable at the time, and unlike other girl groups that imitated Japanese girl groups such as Speed, they took advantage of POP and promoted themselves as the "Spice Girls of Asia".

== Members ==
=== Final members ===
- Kim E-Z – Leader, Main Rapper, Main Dancer, Sub Vocalist (1997–2006, 2024-present)
- Lee Hee-jin – Lead Vocalist, Face of the Group (1997–2006, 2024-present)
- Shim Eun-jin – Lead Vocalist, Lead Dancer (1998–2004, 2024-present)
- Kan Mi-youn – Main Vocalist, Visual (1997–2006, 2024-present)
- Yoon Eun-hye – Sub Vocalist, Maknae (1999–2005, 2024-present)

=== Former members ===
- Cha Yumi - Main Vocalist (1997)
- Jung Hyun-jeon - Leader, Lead Vocalist (1997-1998)
- Jung Shi-woon - Rapper, Vocalist (1997-1998)
- Lee Gai - Sub Vocalist (1998–1999)

== Discography ==
=== Studio albums ===
Title	Album details	Peak chart positions	Sales
Title	Album details	KOR	Sales
Equalizeher (Voice of Xpression)	Released: July 3, 1997; Language: Korean, English; Label: DR, Cream; Format: CD, cassette; Track listing: 1. Interlude - 1:03; 2. "Haircut" (머리하는날) (July 25, 1997) – 3:54 (Han Kyung-hye); 3. "To A Man (Democracy)" (남자에게 (민주주의)) (June 30, 1997) – 3:29 (Han Kyung-hye); 4. "Start" (스타트) – 3:23 (Han Kyung-hye); 5. "Secret" (비밀) – 4:33 (Han Kyung-hye); 6. "Their Own World" (그들만의 세상) – 3:52 (Kim Yong-ho); 7. "Single Mom" (미혼모) – 4:09 (Kim Jin-ah); 8. "Waiting" – 3:23 (John Anonymous); 9. "To A Man (Democracy)" (남자에게 (민주주의)) (instrumental) – 3:26	No data	No data
Baby V.O.X. II	Released: September 15, 1998; Language: Korean, English; Label: DR, Garam; Format: CD, cassette; Track listing: 1. "야야야" (Hey, Hey, Hey) (August 14, 1998) – 3:48 (Kim Hyung-suk); 2. "Break It Up" – 3:42 (Choi Soo-jung); 3. "패자부활전" (Resurrection) – 3:55 (Kim Tae-hee); 4. "Waiting" – 3:37 (John Anonymous); 5. "Change" (October 31, 1998) – 3:48 (Kim Tae-hee, Joo Young-hoon); 6. "Sugar Baby" – 3:48 (Choi Soo-jung); 7. "Top of the World" – 4:03 (John Bettis); 8. "야야야" (Remix TV Version) – 3:50 (Kim Hyung-suk); Notes: Rap by Joe; Same track from Equalizer; Cover of "Top of the World" by The Carpenters	9	KOR: 76,417
Come Come Come Baby	Released: July 21, 1999; Label: DR, Synnara; Format: CD, cassette	5	KOR: 218,946
Why	Released: May 15, 2000; Label: DR, Synnara; Format: CD, cassette	5	KOR: 155,864
Boyish Story	Released: June 4, 2001; Label: DR, Synnara; Format: CD, cassette	8	KOR: 90,014
Devotion	Released: April 3, 2003; Label: DR, Doremi; Format: CD, cassette	3	KOR: 84,612
Ride West	Released: March 18, 2004; Label: DR, EMI; Format: CD, cassette	3	KOR: 32,863

=== Compilation albums ===
Title	Album details	Peak chart positions	Sales
Title	Album details	KOR	Sales
Special Album	Released: April 23, 2002; Label: DR, Doremi; Format: CD, cassette	6	KOR: 240,349

=== Extended plays ===
Title	Album details
Go (Japanese release)	Released: March 12, 2003; Label: Six Beat; Format: CD

=== Single albums ===
Title	Album details
New Baby V.O.X 2025	Released: February 13, 2025; Label: Baby Vox; Format: Digital download

== Awards and nominations ==
Name of the award ceremony, year presented, category, nominated work and the result of the nomination
Award ceremony	Year	Category	Nominee / work	Result	Ref.
Chinese Radio Broadcasting Association	2002	Best Hallyu Artist Award	Baby Vox	Won	
Golden Disc Awards	2002	Popularity Award	"Coincidence" (우연)	Won	
iTV Korea Entertainment Awards	2000	Popularity Singer	Baby Vox	Nominated	
KBS Music Awards	1999	Singer of the Year Award	Baby Vox	Won	
KBS Music Awards	2000	Singer of the Year Award	Baby Vox	Won	
KBS Music Awards	2001	Singer of the Year Award	Baby Vox	Won	
KBS Music Awards	2002	Singer of the Year Award	Baby Vox	Won	
KBS Music Awards	2003	Singer of the Year Award	Baby Vox	Won	
Korea Entertainment and Arts Awards	2000	Next Generation Group Award	Baby Vox	Won	
MBC Gayo Daejejeon	1999	Top Popular Artist	Baby Vox	Won	
SBS Gayo Daejeon	1998	Rookie Award	Baby Vox	Won	
SBS Gayo Daejeon	1999	Top 10 Singers Award	Baby Vox	Won	
SBS Gayo Daejeon	2000	SBS Producer's Award	Baby Vox	Won	
SBS Gayo Daejeon	2002	Main Award (Bonsang)	Baby Vox	Won	
SBS Gayo Daejeon	2003	Main Award (Bonsang)	Baby Vox	Won	
Seoul Music Awards	1999	Main Award (Bonsang)	Baby Vox	Won	
Seoul Music Awards	2000	Popularity Award	Baby Vox	Won	
Seoul Music Awards	2002	Hallyu Award	Baby Vox	Won	
Seoul Music Awards	2002	Popularity Award	Baby Vox	Won	
Seoul Music Awards	2003	Main Award (Bonsang)	Baby Vox	Won	
Seoul Music Awards	2004	Hallyu Award	Baby Vox	Won	

== Future generations ==
On December 26, 2006, DR Music unveiled the members of the second generation Baby V.O.X, a spinoff group called "Baby V.O.X. Re.V" (pronounced "reeve"). Like the original group, there is one lead vocalist, three "sub-vocalists" and a singer/rapper.

RaNia debuted in April 2011 after being originally scheduled in mid-2010. However, the company, DR Music decided to rebrand the group as a new group with eight members. RaNia is the third generation of Baby V.O.X.
