= Kim Hyeong-seok =

South Korean composer

Kim Hyeong-seok (Korean: 김형석; born September 27, 1966) is a composer, lyricist and record producer in South Korea who is known for producing R&B, ballads, rock, dance and idol music. Since beginning his career in 1989, Kim has composed or produced more than 1,400 songs and has worked with many of the top Korean artists, such as Lee Moon-sae, Kim Kwang-seok, Yim Jae-beom, Insooni, Byun Jin-sub, Kim Gun-mo, Shin Seung-hun, Park Jin-young, Solid, Uhm Jung-hwa, Jo Sung-mo, Im Chang-jung, Yoo Seung-jun, Baby Vox, Sung Si-kyung, and IU.

Kim is also known for producing soundtracks for movies and TV dramas, such as for the film My Sassy Girl and TV drama All In.

He appeared on multiple TV shows including as a producer in Season 2 of Sister's Slam Dunk and as a celebrity judge in Season 1 of A Battle of One Voice: 300.

In 2018, Kim performed two piano pieces in Pyongyang, North Korea by the request of President Moon Jae-in, at a joint concert between South and North Korea.

Kim received the KBS Music Awards composer award in 1997 and 2002 and the SBS Music Awards composer award in 1998.

== Legacy ==
Kim Hyeong-seok is considered one of the top five pop music composers of the 90s in South Korea, along with Kim Chang-hwan, Yoon Il-sang, Choi Jun-young, and Joo Young-hoon. He was the music tutor of Park Jin-young, who founded JYP Entertainment, and Bang Si-hyuk, who founded Hybe Corporation. He was also the producer of Baby Vox from 1998 to 2001, a pioneering K-pop girl group. Kim single-handedly composed and produced Baby Vox hit songs such as Ya Ya Ya (1998), Get up (1999), Killer (1999), Missing you (1999), Why (2000), Betrayal (2000), Game Over (2001), and Doll (2001).

== Notable works ==
- Kim Kwang-seok - "In the Name of Love" (1991), "To You" (1992)
- Kim Gun-mo - "First Sight" (1992), "A Beautiful Farewell" (1995)
- Park Jin-young - "Behind You" (1994)
- Solid - "Holding Onto the End of Tonight" (1995)
- Yoo Seung-jun - "Na Na Na" (1998)
- Shin Seung-hun - "I Believe" (2001)
- IU - "Last Fantasy" (2011)

== Filmography ==
=== Television show ===
Year	Title	Role	Ref.
2022	Sing for Gold	Host	
