= Yoon Eun-hye =

South-Korean actress and singer (born 1984)

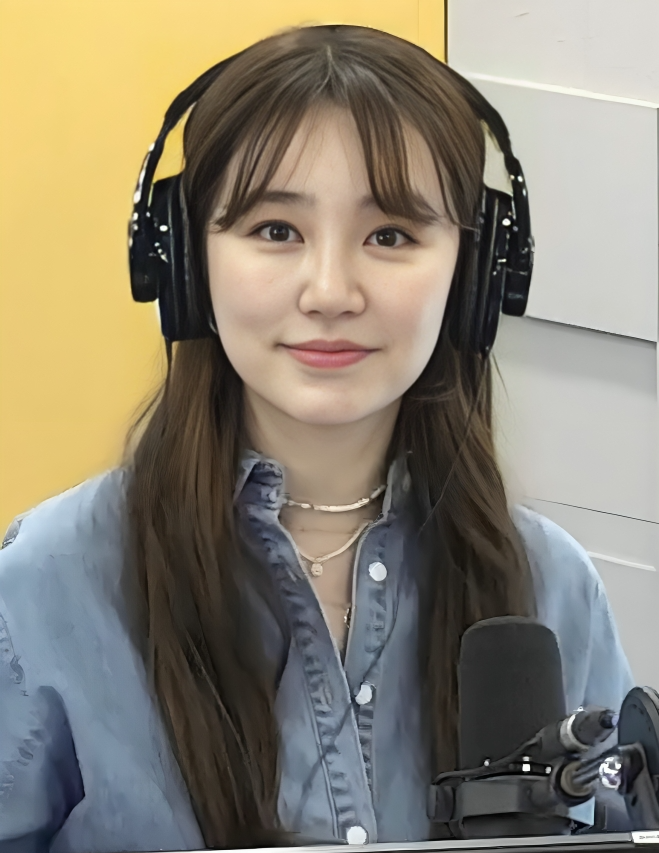
- Yoon in April 2021
- Born: October 3, 1984 (age 42); Seoul, South Korea
- Education: Kyung Hee Cyber University; Chung-Ang University
- Occupations: Singer; actress
- Years active: 1998–present
- Agent: Favor Entertainment
- Musical career
- Genre: K-pop
- Instruments: Vocal
- Years active: 1999–2005; 2008–present
- Label: DR
- Member of: Baby Vox
- Formerly of: WSG Wannabe

Korean name
- Hangul: 윤은혜
- Hanja: 尹恩惠
- RR: Yun Eunhye
- MR: Yun Ŭnhye
- Website: Official website

Signature
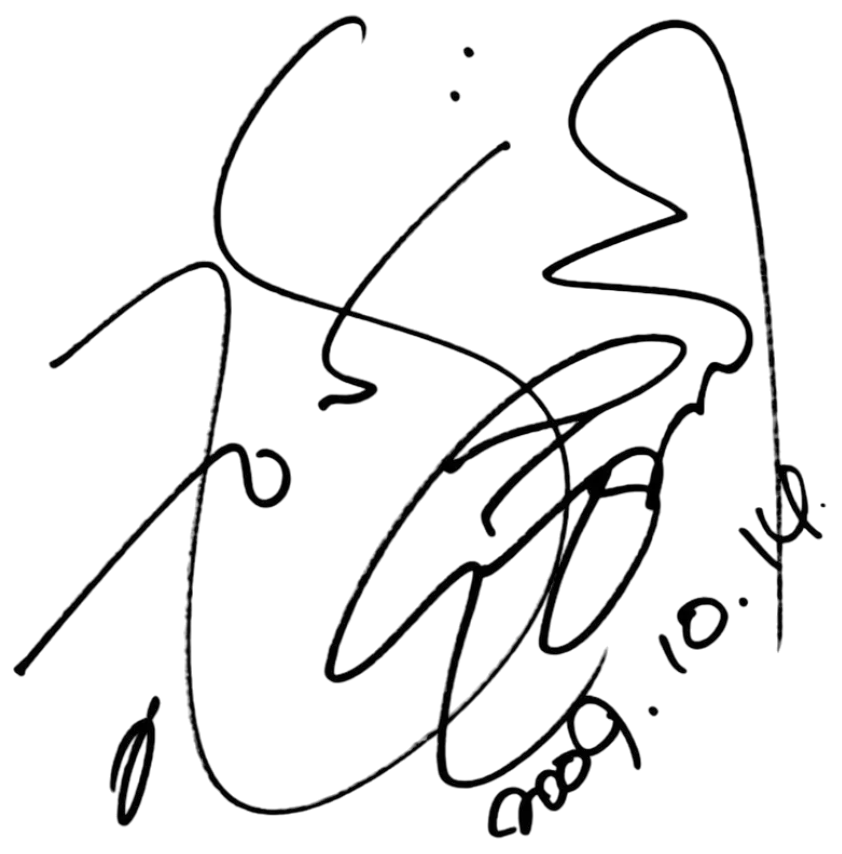

Yoon Eun-hye (Korean: 윤은혜; born October 3, 1984) is a South Korean singer and actress. She debuted as a member of South Korean girl group Baby Vox, staying with the group from 1999 to 2005, as well as WSG Wannabe, a female project group in 2022. Yoon has since moved on to acting and is best known for starring in the television dramas Princess Hours (2006), The Vineyard Man (2006), Coffee Prince (2007), My Fair Lady (2009), Lie to Me (2011), and Missing You (2012).

== Career ==
=== 1999–2005: Debut with Baby V.O.X ===
Yoon debuted as a member of Baby V.O.X at the age of 15, replacing an ex-member (Lee Gai) in 1999. Yoon was the sub-vocal in the group.

After she joined, the group released their third album Come Come Come in 1999. This album became their first major success, with their singles "Get Up" and "Killer" reaching the number one spot on the Korean music charts. In the same year, Yoon became a target of anti-fans. She was shot in the eye by an anti-fan who tried to make her blind with a mixture of soy sauce and vinegar using a water gun. She was rushed to the hospital where the doctors confirmed that her cornea was damaged.

Yoon was also a frequent guest on SBS' popular game show X-Man from 2004 to 2005, gaining popularity for her "girl-warrior" image on the show and her love-line with Kim Jong-kook.

Following fellow member Shim Eun-jin, Yoon ended her six-year activities as a member of Baby V.O.X in July 2005 when her contract with DR Entertainment expired.

=== 2006–2007: Breakthrough success with Princess Hours and Coffee Prince ===
In 2006, Yoon made her acting debut in romantic comedy Princess Hours, where she played an ordinary girl who becomes the crown princess due to an arranged marriage to the crown prince. Initially, fans of the Goong manhwa questioned her acting ability, and sent out petitions against Yoon as the lead role, requesting her to be replaced. Despite the controversy, Princess Hours became a huge success across Asia and catapulted Yoon to Korean Wave stardom.

Yoon then made her debut on the big screen, starring in the film The Legend of Seven Cutter as a boxer. She returned to television with a leading role in The Vineyard Man which aired on KBS in July 2006. The Vineyard Man initially suffered low ratings, but received positive reviews for its heart-warming storyline and the cast's performances, and eventually rose in viewership. Yoon won the Best Actress award at the 2006 Grimae Awards, chosen by cinematographers in every broadcasting station in Korea.

In 2007, Yoon took on the leading role in MBC's drama Coffee Prince. She played a tomboy who was mistaken for a boy by her employer. The drama was another huge success for Yoon, who was hailed by critics as an actress who brings a colorful shade to her character, earning her the title of "Nation's Little Sister". At the 44th Baeksang Arts Awards, Yoon beat out veteran actresses Kim Hee-ae and Park Jin-hee to win the coveted Best Actress award, becoming the youngest actress ever to win the award. Riding the big success of Coffee Prince and Goong, Yoon became one of the highest-paid actresses in the industry.

=== 2008–2011: Career setbacks ===
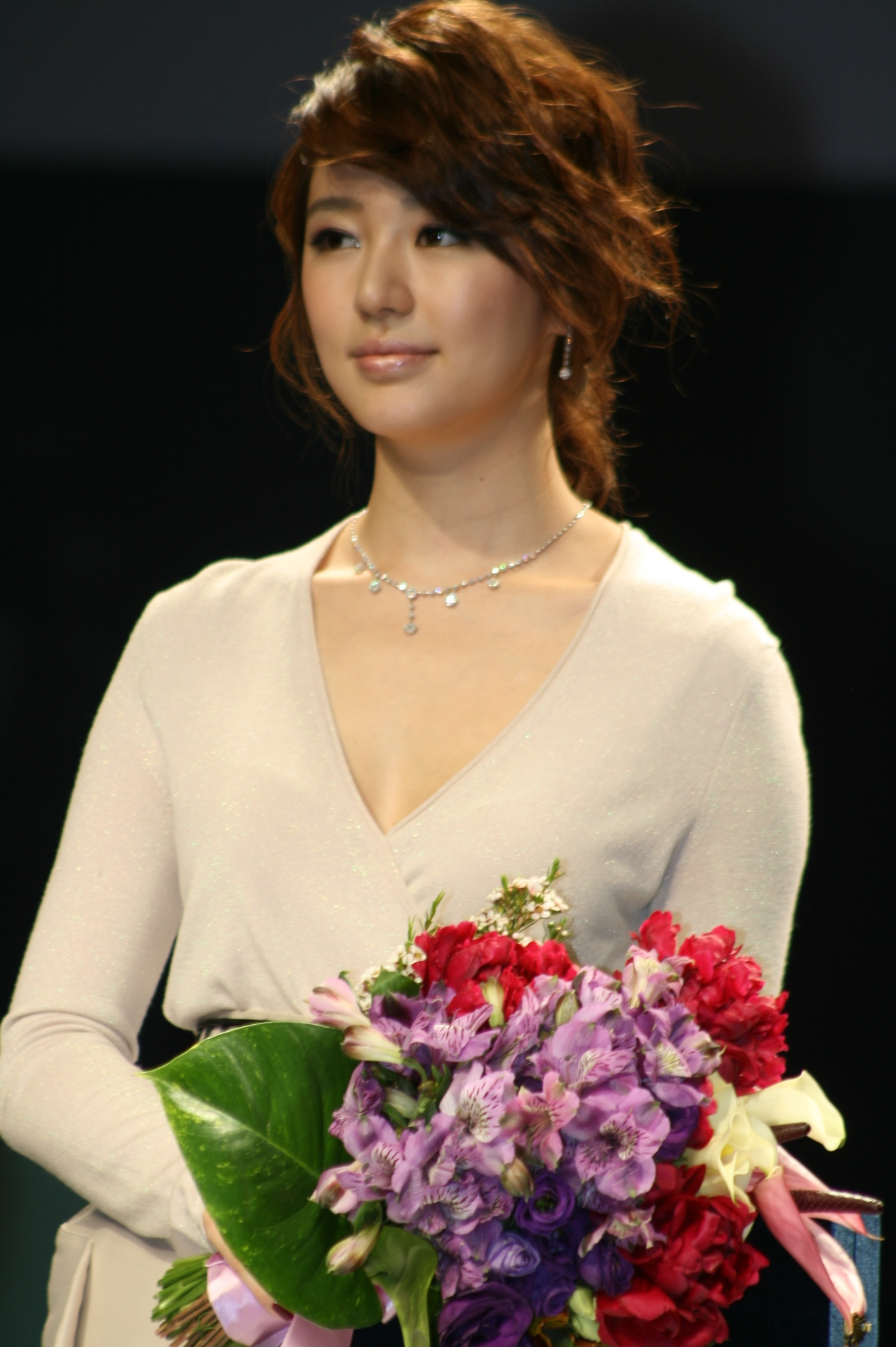
Yoon in 2009

In 2009, Yoon starred in KBS' romantic comedy My Fair Lady, playing an arrogant, strong-headed heiress of a rich business family. Although My Fair Lady was a moderate success, Yoon was harshly criticized for her unnatural speech and accent as well as her regression in acting skills.

Yoon returned to the big screen after five years with the coming-of-age film My Black Mini Dress (2010), based on the same titled chick lit novel by Kim Min-seo. She then starred in SBS's romantic comedy series Lie to Me (2011), playing a smart government official who is unlucky in the love department. However, both projects failed to achieve commercial success.

=== 2012–2015: Directorial debut, acclaim and Goddess Fashion ===
In 2012, Yoon made her directorial debut with the short film The Knitting, which was her first assignment as a graduate student at Chung-Ang University. The film was screened at the 17th Busan International Film Festival and competed in the Korean Short Film Competition. It was also screened at the 38th Seoul Independent Film Festival as one of the five short films in the "New Choice" category. The same year, she served as jury for the 'Face of Short Film Awards' at the Asian International Short Film Festival (AISFF).

In late 2012, Yoon starred in MBC's melo-thriller Missing You, playing a victim of sexual abuse. The role marked a turning point for Yoon, who received critical acclaim for her performance. This was followed up with a leading role in KBS's romantic comedy Marry Him If You Dare, where she played a 32-year-old call center agent who travels back in time to change her future. In 2014, Yoon was cast alongside Park Si-hoo in the Chinese-South Korean romance film After Love.

In 2015, Yoon made a special appearance in the film Chronicle of a Blood Merchant, directed by Ha Jung-woo. She then joined the second season of Goddess Fashion, a Chinese fashion design survival program where the participants have to show off their own created designs to the judges. On August 29, 2015, Yoon was awarded No. 1 in an evaluation.

=== 2017–present: Return from hiatus ===
In 2017, Yoon made her return to the Korean entertainment industry by appearing as a regular in tvN's variety show Dear Pet, We Need to Talk.

In 2018, Yoon was cast in the romantic comedy drama Love Alert. This marks her return to the small screen five years since her last drama Marry Him If You Dare in 2013.

In 2019, Yoon starred in the 2-episode romance drama Go Go Song.

== Controversies ==
=== Conflicts with management ===
In July 2007, conflicts with Yoon's Management Eight Peaks surfaced; eventually Yoon filed a Certification Of Contents (COC) to cancel her contractual agreement with the company. The contents of the first COC stated that in January 2007, Yoon was confirmed to star in the MBC drama Que Sera Sera and had even completed the script reading and rehearsal for the upcoming shoot. However, the company forced Yoon to withdraw for Yoon to star in a company-produced drama, and as an effect, she was replaced by Jung Yu-mi. After her withdrawal, Yoon took a two-day vacation to Gangwon Province in March. Eight Peaks claimed that they had no knowledge of this so-called incident and spread a rumour of Yoon's irresponsibility online which damaged her reputation. Yoon filed a second COC in August, which included evidence to support the disagreeable actions made by Eight Peaks. These actions included the improper handling and distribution/division of earnings and proceeds as well as the unilateral (one-sided) manner of making and carrying out decisions which caused immense problems."

Yoon and Eight Peaks finally came to a mutual agreement through careful negotiations and settled their disputes amicably. With her contract dispute resolved, it was reported in October 2008 that Yoon signed on with Kraze Entertainment as her new management company.

=== Plagiarism accusations ===
Following Yoon's win on the Chinese fashion program Goddess Fashion, in which she presented a white coat with collars and a unique fringe on the sleeves to give a feeling of wings following the film theme of Chronicles of Narnia, Yoon was accused of plagiarism by Korean fashion designer Yoon Choon-ho. The designer accused the actress of ripping off his design after being made aware of her piece on the show, and posted a comparison of his creation versus hers, stating that he and his team had worked hard on the piece from the F/W (Fall/Winter) line. Yoon Choon-ho additionally revealed that he had heard her and her stylist had picked up a sponsorship outfit just days ago. Additionally, she was embroiled in another allegation of plagiarism when another design of hers was accused of being similar to a dress from 2015 F/W Dolce & Gabbana.

She denied the allegations, saying that her idea for the outfit came from a 2008 Victor & Rolf style and the 2014 Lanvin Collection, which used feather decorations. She further condemned Yoon Choon-ho for trying to cash in on her fame.

== Filmography ==
=== Film ===
Year	Title	Role	Notes
2002	Emergency Act 19	Singer of Vegiemeal with Baby V.O.X	(cameo)
2006	The Legend of Seven Cutter	Han Min-joo	
2011	My Black Mini Dress	Lee Yoo-min	
2012	The Knitting		Short film; as director
2015	Chronicle of a Blood Merchant	Im Boon-bang	(cameo)
2016	After Love	Yin Hong	

=== Television series ===
Year	Title	Role	Notes/Ref.
2006	Princess Hours	Shin Chae-gyung	
2006	The Vineyard Man	Lee Ji-hyun	
2007	Coffee Prince	Go Eun-chan	
2009	My Fair Lady	Kang Hye-na	
2010	Personal Taste	Yoon Eun-soo	(cameo, episode 8)
2011	Lie to Me	Gong Ah-jung	
2012	Road for Hope	Herself	(cameo)
2012–2013	Missing You	Lee Soo-yeon / Zoe	
2013	Marry Him If You Dare	Na Mi-rae	
2018	Happy to Meet You	Herself	Chinese drama (cameo)
2018	Love Alert	Yoon Yoo-jung	
2019	Go Go Song	Gong Sun-hwa	

=== Variety shows ===
Year	Title	Notes	Ref.
2004–2005	X-Man		
2020–2021	Stars' Top Recipe at Fun-Staurant	Episode 49–51, 61-63	
2020	Law of the Jungle in Zero Point	Cast member	
2021	Cooking - The Birth of a Cooking King	contestant	
2022	Hangout with Yoo	Cast as WSG Wannabe	
2022	Kilimanjaro	Cast Member with Hyojung, Uee, and Son Ho-jun	

=== Hosting ===
Year	Title	Notes	Ref.
2024	2024 MBC Entertainment Awards	With Jun Hyun-moo, Lee Jang-woo	

== Discography ==
=== Singles ===
Year	Track	Singer	Album
2008	"Salad Song"	Yoon Eun Hye feat. Lee Dong-gun	Samsung Ziple commercial film
2008	"사랑해 (I Love You)"	Mighty Mouth feat. Yoon Eun Hye	Digital single
2009	"Ziple 'Asak'"		Samsung Ziple commercial film
2009	"Romance"	Yoon Eun Hye & Yoon Sang Hyun	My Fair Lady OST
2009	"Dash Girl"		My Fair Lady OST
2010	"AM 5:00 Do.U Production Crew (Outro)"		[Do.U] Know Me
2010	"Tic Tok"	2PM feat. Yoon Eun Hye	Digital single
2011	"Love Is Blind"		My Black Mini Dress OST
2011	"My Black Mini Dress"	Yoon Eun-hye, Park Han-byul, Cha Ye-ryun & Yoo In-na	My Black Mini Dress OST

== Ambassadorship ==
- Public Relations Ambassador for Famine Countermeasures (2023)

== Awards and nominations ==
All Awards listed below are referenced from The House Company & Naver

Year	Award	Category	Work	Result
2006	42nd Baeksang Arts Awards	Best New Actress – Television	Goong	Nominated
2006	19th Grimae Awards	Best Actress	The Vineyard Man	Won
2006	MBC Drama Awards	Best New Actress	Goong	Won
2006	MBC Drama Awards	Popularity Award, Actress	Goong	Nominated
2006	MBC Drama Awards	Best Couple Award with Ju Ji-hoon	Goong	Nominated
2006	KBS Drama Awards	Excellence Award, Actress	The Vineyard Man	Nominated
2006	KBS Drama Awards	Best New Actress	The Vineyard Man	Won
2006	KBS Drama Awards	Popularity Award, Actress	The Vineyard Man	Nominated
2006	KBS Drama Awards	Best Couple Award with Oh Man-seok	The Vineyard Man	Won
2007	MBC Drama Awards	Top Excellence Award, Actress	Coffee Prince	Won
2007	MBC Drama Awards	Popularity Award, Actress	Coffee Prince	Nominated
2007	MBC Drama Awards	Best Couple Award with Gong Yoo	Coffee Prince	Nominated
2007	Star News Chief Producer's Choice Acting Awards	Outstanding Actress Award	Coffee Prince	Won
2008	44th Baeksang Arts Awards	Best Actress – Television	Coffee Prince	Won
2008	48th Monte Carlo Television Festival	Best Actress	Coffee Prince	Nominated
2008	3rd Seoul International Drama Awards	Best Actress	Coffee Prince	Nominated
2009	KBS Drama Awards	Excellence Award, Actress in a Miniseries	My Fair Lady	Nominated
2009	KBS Drama Awards	Popularity Award, Actress	My Fair Lady	Won
2009	KBS Drama Awards	Best Couple Award with Yoon Sang-hyun	My Fair Lady	Won
2011	SBS Drama Awards	Top Excellence Award, Actress in a Special Planning Drama	Lie To Me	Nominated
2012	MBC Drama Awards	Top Excellence Award, Actress	Missing You	Nominated
2012	MBC Drama Awards	Popularity Award, Actress	Missing You	Won
2012	MBC Drama Awards	Best Couple Award with Park Yoo-chun	Missing You	Nominated
2012	MBC Drama Awards	Best Couple Award with Yoo Seung-ho	Missing You	Nominated
2012	MBC Drama Awards	Hallyu Star of the Year	Missing You	Won
2013	Hallyu 10th Anniversary Grand Prizes	Grand Prix, Best Actress	Missing You	Won
2013	KBS Drama Awards	Excellence Award, Actress in a Miniseries	Marry Him If You Dare	Nominated
2013	KBS Drama Awards	Netizen Award, Actress	Marry Him If You Dare	Nominated
2013	KBS Drama Awards	Best Couple Award with Lee Dong-gun	Marry Him If You Dare	Nominated
2016	18th Huading Awards	Global Best TV Actress	—N/a	Won
