= Lee Hee-jin =

South Korean singer and actress (born 1979)

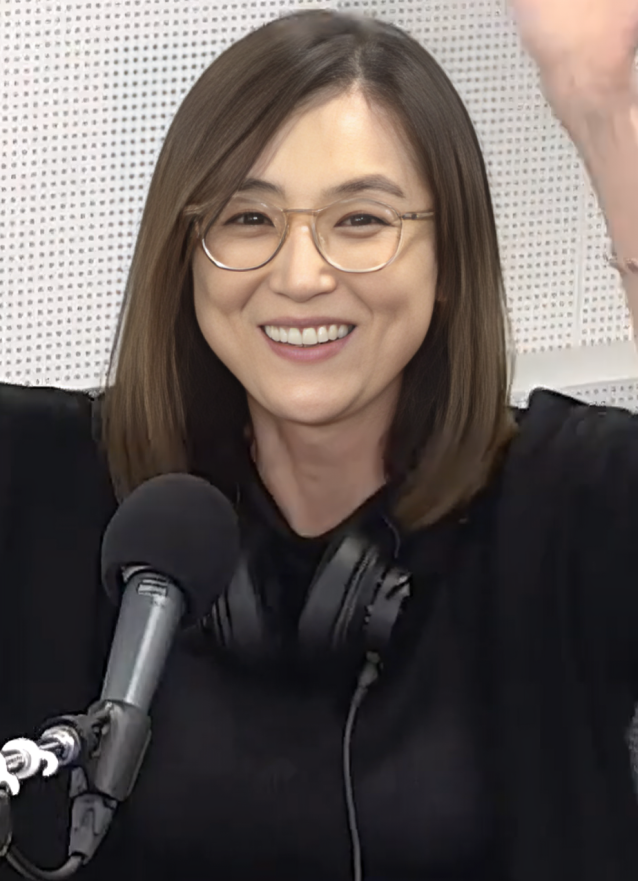
- Lee in July 2021
- Born: Lee Hee-jin; 16 May 1979 (age 46); Seoul, South Korea
- Education: Dong-Ah Broadcasting College
- Occupations: Singer; actress
- Years active: 1997–present
- Agent: K1 Entertainment
- Musical career
- Genres: K-pop
- Instruments: Vocal
- Label: DR Music
- Member of: Baby Vox

Korean name
- Hangul: 이희진
- Hanja: 李姬珍
- RR: I Huijin
- MR: I Hŭijin
- IPA: i.çi.d͡ʑin

Lee Hee-jin (Korean: 이희진; born 16 May 1979) is a South Korean singer and actress and a member of girl group Baby V.O.X.

== Early life and career ==
Lee studied at Dong-Ah Broadcasting College, then made her entertainment debut in 1997 as a member of popular K-pop girl group Baby V.O.X. After Baby V.O.X. disbanded in 2006, Lee decided to pursue an acting career.

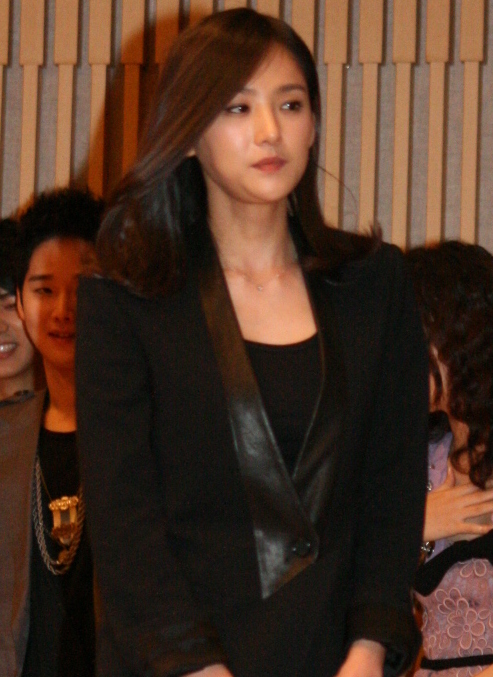
Lee at It's Okay, Daddy's Girl press conference in 2009

After joining a few stage plays and musicals, Lee was cast in the television drama It's Okay, Daddy's Girl (2010). She has since played supporting roles in The Greatest Love (2011), My Lover, Madame Butterfly (2012), and Monstar (2013).

In 2011, she was chosen Best New Actress in the TV Drama category at the 19th Korean Culture and Entertainment Awards.

== Filmography ==
=== Television series ===
Year	Title	Role
2002	Zoo People	Lee Hee-jin
2010	It's Okay, Daddy's Girl	Eun Ae-ryung
2011	The Greatest Love	Jenny
2011	Happy and	Hye-won (episode 1); Seon-mi (episode 5); Hee-joo (episode 9)
2012	Big	the bride Min-joo (cameo, episode 1)
2012	God of War	Nan-yi, concubine killed by Choe Hang (cameo)
2012	My Lover, Madame Butterfly	Yeon Ji-yeon
2013	The King's Doctor	Woohee (cameo)
2013	Monstar	Dokko Soon
2013	Special Affairs Team TEN 2	Song Hwa-young (guest, episode 8)
2013	Medical Top Team	Yoo Hye-ran
2013	Golden Rainbow	Park Hwa-ran
2014	Dr. Frost	Yoo Anna/Sung-hye
2015	Riders: Catch Tomorrow	Oh Jung-In
2017	The Lady in Dignity	Kim Hyo-joo
2018	The Last Empress	Princess So-jin

=== Film ===
Year	Title	Role
2002	Emergency Act 19	Herself (cameo by Baby V.O.X.)
2015	Love at the End of The World	Lee Mi Yoon
2016	Trick	Cameo

=== Variety show ===
Year	Title
2012	Choi Hyun-woo and Noh Hong-chul's Magic Hall
2013	This is Magic
2019	Knowing Bros

== Theater ==
Year	Title	Role
2003	Funky Funky	
2008	Singin' in the Rain	
2009	Monkey	
2010	Crash Course in Love	
2010	Aeja	
