= Kim E-Z =

South Korean singer (born 1979)

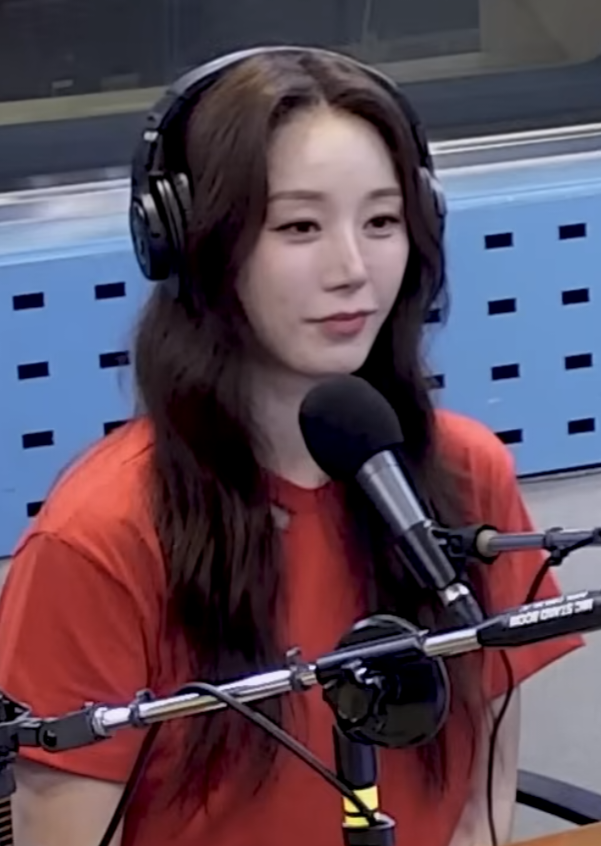
- Kim in September 2025
- Born: Kim Hee-jung; January 31, 1979 (age 47)
- Education: Kyung Hee University
- Occupations: Singer; rapper; actress; television host
- Years active: 1997–present
- Spouse: Song Hyun-seok (m. 2010)
- Children: 2
- Musical career
- Genres: K-pop; hip-hop
- Instrument: Vocal
- Label: DR
- Member of: Baby Vox

Korean name
- Hangul: 김희정
- RR: Gim Huijeong
- MR: Kim Hŭijŏng

Stage name
- Hangul: 김이지
- RR: Gim Iji
- MR: Kim Iji

Kim Hee-jung (Korean: 김희정; born January 31, 1979), better known as Kim E-Z (김이지), is a South Korean singer, rapper, actress and television host and a member of the Korean girl group Baby V.O.X.

== Pre-debut ==
Kim E-Z graduated from Kyung Hee University's dance program in 1997.

== Career ==
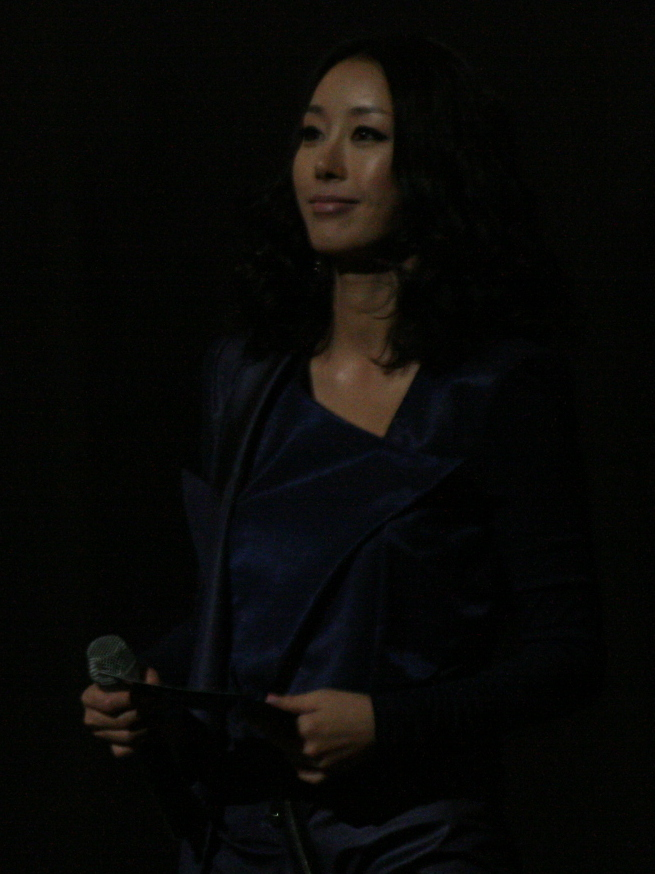
Kim in 2009

As its oldest member, Kim had been the leader of Baby V.O.X and had been assigned the 'sexy' role in the group. She was the group's rapper and sang sub vocals.

In March 2006, after Baby V.O.X broke up, Kim decided to pursue an acting career. She has also worked as an MC for Mnet.

She is married to a stock manager Song Hyun-seok since April 2010.
