= Kan Mi-youn =

South Korean entertainer (born 1982)

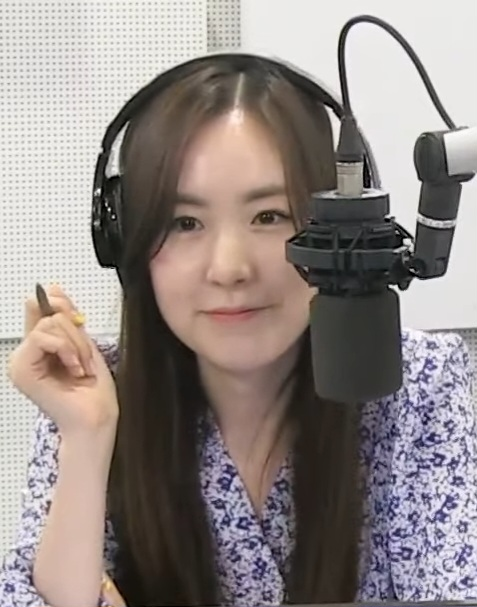
- Kan in 2021
- Born: Kan Mi-youn; February 2, 1982 (age 44); Seoul, South Korea
- Occupations: Singer; actress; radio host; fashion designer; businesswoman
- Years active: 1997–present
- Spouse: Hwang Ba-wool (m. 2019)
- Musical career
- Genres: K-pop; R&B
- Instrument: Vocals
- Labels: DR; H2; Source; Mako Amusement; Dream Stone
- Member of: Baby V.O.X

Korean name
- Hangul: 간미연
- Hanja: 簡美姸
- RR: Gan Miyeon
- MR: Kan Miyŏn

Kan Mi-youn (Korean: 간미연; born February 2, 1982) is a South Korean singer, actress, radio host, fashion designer, and businesswoman. Kan joined the South Korean girl group Baby V.O.X. in October 1997, which went on to become one of the most popular girl groups of that time. Kan went on to become a solo artist after the group disbanded in February 2006.

== Career ==
=== 1997–2006: Baby V.O.X ===
Kan Mi-youn debuted in October 1997 as a new member of the first generation girl group Baby V.O.X, replacing ex-member Cha Yu-Mi, who was injured on stage during a performance. Kan was given the title of 'princess' by her fellow members and fans, and was known for her cute and comical traits. Kan was considered the main, and best, vocalist of the group, due to her ability to hit high notes.

Following the release of Baby V.O.X's third studio album, Come Come Come Baby, the lead single, Get Up, reached number one on Korea's pop charts, securing their spot as one of Korea's top pop music groups. The group gained a vast loyal fan base in Korea, China, Thailand and other Asian markets.

Despite garnering a large fan base, Kan was a frequent target of anti-fans. The most shocking incident was in 1999, when Kan was targeted for murder by a fan of the Korean boy group H.O.T. Kan was rumored to be dating H.O.T member Moon Hee Joon, which attracted many anti-fans and negative press. She received an envelope containing razor blades and a letter threatening to murder her.

=== 2006: Solo career ===
In 2006, Kan made the decision to pursue a solo career and signed with H2 Entertainment, thus ending her eight years of activities as a member of Baby V.O.X. Following her departure, Baby V.O.X released one final album and disbanded.

On September 15, 2006, Kan released her first solo album, Refreshing. The album was a reflection on her personal life and maturing as a woman.

Following the release of her album, and after learning how to fluently speak in Mandarin, Kan made the decision to break into the Chinese music market.

=== 2007–2009: Chinese market ===
While focusing on the Chinese market, Kan managed to reach a significant level of success. One of Kan's most notable feats was winning a famous Mandarin singing competition, 名声大震, with Chinese singer Anson Hu. It was this show that shot her into stardom, securing her as a successful artist in the Chinese music market.

In January 2008, Kan released a Chinese version of her debut Korean album, Refreshing.

Following the Sichuan earthquake in China, Kan collaborated with various Asian artists to release "Promise" and "I Love Asia" for a fund raising project that supported the victims of the earthquake.

In 2009, Kan left H2 Entertainment and moved to the then-newly launched Source Music label, founded by her then-manager So Sung-jin.

=== 2010: Return to Korea ===
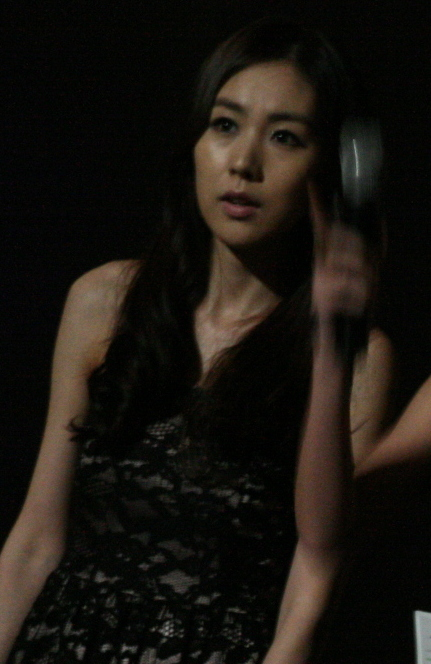
Kan in 2009

On July 1, 2010, Kan Mi-youn made her comeback in South Korea after a three-year absence. Despite her hiatus, Kan proved that she was still hot in the Korean industry. With her new short hair and sexy image, Kan released her first digital single, Going Crazy (ft. Mir of MBLAQ). The music video, which featured Lee Joon and Mir of MBLAQ, recorded over 200,000 views in under an hour on GomTV.

The song proved to be quite successful, and managed to peak at #11 on Korea's top music chart, Gaon.

On July 15, 2010, Kan officially launched her own fashion line named Kanderella. The line was eventually sold on exclusive websites and was reported to be in high demand.

=== 2011: WATCH and OBSESSION ===
On February 8, 2011, Kan released a music video teaser for Sunshine (ft. Junsu), a pre-release single for her upcoming album. The full-length music video and song were released the following day.

On February 14, 2011, a music video teaser for her lead single, Paparazzi, was released. Two days later, the full-length music video of Paparazzi, (starring Kim Hyung-jun of SS501), was released. The full-length mini-album, WATCH, was digitally and physically released the following day. Promotions for Paparazzi began on February 18, 2011, on M! Countdown. The song experienced much attention and even placed Kan in the top spots on music stations, as well as digital music charts.

On September 26, 2011, a music video teaser for Kan's new song, Won't Meet You, was released. Two days later, the full-length music video to Won't Meet You, as well as her second mini-album, OBSESSION, were released. Promotions for Won't Meet You began on September 29, 2011, on M! Countdown.

On October 24, 2011, Kan took over from Noh Hong-chul as DJ for MBC FM4U's Close Friends radio program. The program invites popular Korean singers to showcase their talents and interact with fans. Kan celebrated her 300-day anniversary in August 2012 and reported the program's ratings were higher than ever. Kan ended her position and handed over the baton to UV's Muzie on October 22, 2012. The show has since been canceled and replaced by FM Date.

=== 2014—present ===
In May 2014, Kan signed a contract with Mako Amusement to further both her musical and acting career. She joined her fellow ex-Baby V.O.X member Shim Eun-jin who is also signed with Mako.

== Personal life ==
Kan married musical actor Hwang Ba-wool on November 9, 2019, after three years of dating.

== Discography ==
=== Studio albums ===
Title	Album details	Peak chart positions	
Title	Album details	KOR	CHI
Refreshing	Released: September 19, 2006 (KOR); Label: Stone Music Entertainment; Formats: CD, digital download	—	—
Refreshing	Released: February 12, 2008 (CHI); Label: Stone Music Entertainment; Formats: CD, digital download	—	—
"—" denotes releases that did not chart or were not released in that region. Note - The Gaon Chart was established in February 2010. Releases before this date have no chart data.

=== Extended plays ===
Title	Album details	Peak chart positions	Sales
Title	Album details	KOR	Sales
Watch	Released: February 21, 2011; Label: Source Music, Genie Music; Formats: CD, digital download	8	KOR: 1,839+
Obsession	Released: September 29, 2011; Label: Source Music, Genie Music; Formats: CD, digital download	21	KOR: 1,309+

=== Singles ===
Title	Year	Peak chart positions	Album
Title	Year	KOR	Album
"Winter"	2007	—	Non-album release
"Sunshine (feat. Junsu)"	2011	82	Watch
"Good Love"	2011	73	Feeling Project #1
"The Day the Light Disappeared"	2011	96	Feeling Project #2
"Lose You"	2012	62	Feeling Project #3

=== Promotional singles ===
Title	Year	Peak chart positions	Album
Title	Year	KOR	Album
"Going Crazy (feat. Mir)"	2010	11	Watch
"Paparazzi"(feat. Eric Mun)	2011	15	Watch
"Won't Meet You"	2011	43	Obsession

== Videography ==
=== Music videos ===
Title	Year
"Old Woman"	2006
"Kiss"	2006
"여우별"	2007
"如果, 可以爱你"	2008
"陷入爱里面"	2008
"巴黎铁塔"	2008
"너에게 약속하는 7가지"	2008
"情"情场大片"	2008
"Going Crazy" (feat. Mir)	2010
"Sunshine (feat. Junsu)"	2011
"Paparazzi"	2011
"Good Love"	2011
"Won't Meet You"	2011
"Us That Day"	2015

== Filmography ==
=== Film ===
Year	Title	Role	Notes/Ref.
2010	Nana's Rose War	Ping Guo (Apple)	Supporting role
TBA	Hantang		

=== Television series ===
Year	Title	Role	Notes
2002	Nonstop 3	Herself	Supporting role
2012	The Strongest K-Pop Survival		Special appearance
2015	Eve's Love	Oh Bit-na	Cameo appearance
2015	Kill Me, Heal Me	Shin Se Gi's girlfriend	Cameo (Ep. 1)
2016	Moorim School: Saga of the Brave	Yoo-di	Supporting role
2016	Memory	Young-Jin's ex-girlfriend	Guest
2017	Missing 9		Supporting role
2017	Hit the Top	Ha Soo-young	Special appearance (Ep. 16)

=== Variety shows ===
Year	Title	Notes/Ref.
2008	간미연의 트렌드섹션	
2010	여자만세	
2017	King of Mask Singer	Contestant as "Mrs. Curie" (Episodes 123–124)
2021	Goal Girl	Cast Member Season 2

== Awards ==
All awards listed below are referenced from Source Music & Naver

Year	Awards
1998	Sports Seoul Music Awards: New Artist Award; SBS Music Awards: Choice Award & Vocalist Award; KBS Music Awards: New Artist Award
1999	10th Seoul Music Awards: Best Singer Award; SBS Music Awards: Choice Award; KBS Music Awards: Choice Award; MBC Music Awards: Choice Award; KMTVMusic Awards: Choice Award; M-net Music Awards: Choice Award
2000	제1회 애견문화인의 상; 11th Seoul Music Awards: Most Popular Award; SBS Music Awards: Choice Award; KBS Music Awards: Choice Award; ITV Music Awards: Choice Award
2001	MBC Music Awards: Choice Award; KBS Music Awards: Choice Award; Golden Disk Awards: Most Popular Award; Award Model Line: Best Dressed Singer; Sports Seoul Music Awards: 선행상
2002	SBS Music Award: Most Popular Song Award; KBS Music Award: Choice Award; Golden Disk Awards: Choice Award; KMTV Music Awards: Hallyu Special Award; 13th Seoul Music Awards: Choice Award
2003	Korean Music Awards: Best Singer of the Year; 14th Seoul Music Awards: Choice Award; SBS Music Award: Choice Award; KBS Music Award: Choice Award; Golden Disk Awards: Choice Award; Sports Seoul Music Awards: 본상
2004	15th Seoul Music Awards: Hallyu Award; Channel V Thailand: Asian Sensation Award
2006	2006 International Audio Visual Exposition of China: Special Award
2007	2007 Chinese University Music Festival: Most Popular Foreign Singer; 2007 Chinese TV Singing Competition "名声大震": Champion (with Anson Hu); 2007 International Entertainment Online: Best Upcoming Korean Female Star
2009	7th Southeast 동남 경폭 Music Awards: Best International Artist Award
