= DR Music =

South Korean entertainment management company

DR Music Co., Ltd.
- Native name: 주식회사 DR뮤직
- Type: Private
- Industry: Music
- Genre: K-pop; R&B; Hip hop; Trot
- Founded: 1989; 37 years ago
- Founder: Yoon Deung-ryeong
- Headquarters: Seoul, South Korea
- Number of locations: Fourth floor of Hannuriseum, 507-7 Sinsa-dong, Gangnam-gu
- Area served: Asia

DR Music (formerly known as DR Entertainment; Korean: DR뮤직), is a South Korean private-held music company established in 1989 by Yoon Deung-ryeong. It currently manages girl group Blackswan and co-ed group K-Tigers Zero.

The label is formerly home to acts such artists such as Baby V.O.X, A4, Zhang Liyin, As One, and Baby Vox Re.V.

== History ==
DR Music was officially founded in 1989 by Yoon Deung-ryeong as an underground music label.

In 1999, DR debuted its first boy group, A4, which would later disband in 2001 following the departure of member Wheesung.

Following the disbandment of Baby VOX, DR Music debuted Baby VOX Re.V in 2007 to continue the group's legacy. They later disbanded privately in 2009.

In 2020, DR Music signed martial arts k-pop group, K-TIGERS ZERO.

In October 2020, DR Music debuted their multinational girl group, Blackswan and regarding the end activities of Rania, after their member was announced to re-debut with Blackswan.

In May 2024, Trot singer Na Tae-joo was transferred from his previous agency K-Tigers Entertainment to DR Music. In September 2024, Trot singer Kang Ye-seul signed with DR Music. In December 2024, Miss Trot 2 contestant Kim Eui-young signed with DR Music.

== Artists ==
=== Groups ===
- Blackswan
- K-Tigers Zero

=== Soloists ===
- Na Tae-joo
- Kang Ye-seul
- Kim Eui-young
- Fatou
- Nvee

== Former artists ==
- Baby V.O.X. (1997–2006)
  - Cha Yumi (1997)
  - Jung Hyeon-jeon (1997–1998)
  - Jung Shi-woon (1997–1998)
  - Lee Gai (1993–1999) (Note: Previously debuted under the company in 1993 as Lee Heejung.)
  - Shim Eun-jin (1998–2004)
  - Yoon Eun-hye (1999–2005)
  - Kim E-Z (1997–2006)
  - Lee Hee-jin (1997–2006)
  - Kan Mi-youn (1997–2006)
- A4 (1999–2001)
  - Wheesung (1999)
  - Jay (1999–2001)
  - Steve (1999–2001)
  - Austin (1999–2001)
- Zhang Liyin (2002–2003)
- As One (2004–2005)
- Baby V.O.X. Re.V (2007–2009)
  - Han Aeri (2007)
  - Myung Sarang (2007)
  - An Jinkyoung (2007–2009)
  - Yang Eunji (2007–2009)
  - Hwang Yeonkyoung (2007–2009)
  - Oh Minjin (2008–2009)
  - Park Sori (2008–2009)
- Rania / BP Rania (2011–2020)
  - Joy (2011–2012)
  - Riko (2011–2014)
  - Jooyi (2011–2015)
  - Di (2011–2016)
  - T-ae (2011–2016)
  - Xia (2011–2016)
  - Saem/Yina (2011–2014; 2016–2017)
  - Alexandra (2015–2017)
  - Yumin (2016–2018)
  - Ttabo (2016–2018)
  - Seulji/Zi.U (2015–2019)
  - Jieun (2016–2019)
  - Namfon (2018–2020)
  - Seunghyun (2019–2020)
  - Larissa/Leia (2019–2020)
  - Youngheun (2019–2020)
  - Hyeme (2015–2020)
- Blackswan
  - Hyeme (2020)
  - Youngheun (2020–2022)
  - Judy (2020–2022)
  - Larissa/Leia (2020–2023)
