= Shim Eun-jin =

South Korean singer and actress (born 1981)

- 심은진
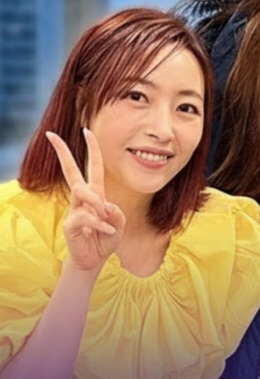
- Shim in September 2025
- Born: February 6, 1981 (age 45); Seoul, South Korea
- Education: Kyonggi University
- Occupations: Singer; actress
- Years active: 1998–present
- Spouse: Jeon Seung-bin (m. 2021)
- Musical career
- Genres: K-pop; R&B; dance-pop; Ballad
- Instruments: Vocal
- Years active: 1998–present
- Labels: DR; Mako Amusement; Imagine Asia
- Member of: Baby Vox

Shim Eun-jin (Korean: 심은진; born February 6, 1981) is a South Korean singer and actress. She is a member of South Korean girl group Baby V.O.X.

== Career ==
Shim Eun-jin launched her singing career in 1998 as a member of Baby V.O.X, one of the most prominent South Korean girl groups of the 1990s. She was the first to leave the group at the end of 2004, publicly stating that she did not agree with the direction their record company DR Music was heading.

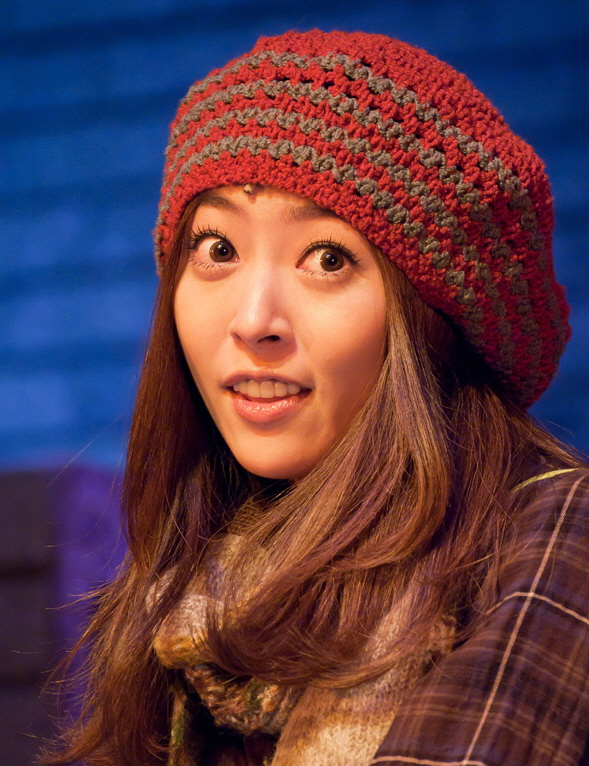
Shim in 2010

After a short absence from the entertainment scene, she re-emerged at the end of 2005 with her first solo album, Zeeny's, which was released by the label CJ Music on December 16, 2005. The first single, "Oopsy," was a sexy dance number, allowing Shim to showcase her sexy dance moves (which she was best known for during her time as a Baby V.O.X member). She then moved on to a ballad as her second single, although it was not promoted heavily. Sales of the album were mediocre, although not abysmal. While promoting her album, she went on various variety shows, and launched her clothing line, Z'BAGO.

In 2006, Shim made her acting debut in the period drama Dae Jo-yeong.

She held her first solo art exhibition titled Share Joy and Sorrow at the Jeong-am Art Gallery in June 2013; more than 60 of her artworks were on display, including photographs, croquis and writings. She had previously joined the Asia Top Gallery Hotel Art Fair in 2010. In 2017, she released her art book entitled Hello, stranger.

== Discography ==
=== Solo artist ===
==== Zeeny's ====
1. "Choking Day"
2. "The Blue Time" (파란 시간)
3. "At a Place Where Love Fades" (사랑이 떠나는 길목에서)
4. "You're Just Like Me" (그대가 나인가봐요)
5. "Oopsy"
6. "Erase"
7. "Better Dayz"
8. "Loving Alone" (혼자 사랑하는 일)
9. "Amnesia" (기억상실)
10. "Stop It"
11. "Heartache" (가슴에 못이 박히게)
12. "The Blue Time II" (파란시간 II)

==== Contributions to other albums ====
1. "My Love" (My Little Bride OST)
2. "Look" (봐봐) – WAWA feat. Shim Eun-jin

== Filmography ==
=== Television series ===
- Bad Love (MBC, 2019)
- The Rich Son (MBC, 2018)
- The Love Is Coming (SBS, 2016)
- KBS Drama Special "Suspicious Ward No. 7" (KBS2, 2014)
- Diary of a Night Watchman (MBC, 2014)
- Love in Her Bag (jTBC, 2013)
- Pots of Gold (MBC, 2013)
- Can Love Become Money? (MBN, 2012)
- Ice Adonis (tvN, 2012)
- Kiss and the City (E Channel, 2010)
- The Great Merchant (KBS1, 2010)
- Swallow the Sun (SBS, 2009)
- Star's Lover (SBS, 2008)
- Life Special Investigation Team (MBC, 2008)
- Break (Mnet, 2006)
- Dae Jo-yeong (KBS1, 2006)

=== Film ===
- Sana-hee Pure (2021)
- Will You Be There? (2016, special appearance)
- Woo-joo's Christmas (2016)
- Three Summer Nights (2015)
- The Treacherous (2015)
- Kong's Family (2013)
- Jenny, Juno (2005)
- Emergency Act 19 (2002, cameo)

=== TV Show ===
- 8 vs 1 (SBS, 2008)
- King of Mask Singer (MBC, 2017)
