= 2001 in South Korean music =

The following is a list of notable events and releases that happened in 2001 in music in South Korea.

== Debuting and disbanded in 2001 ==
=== Debuting groups ===
- 5tion
- Clazziquai Project
- Electron Sheep
- The Geeks
- The Jadu
- Jewelry
- jtL
- KISS
- K'Pop
- M.I.L.K
- Nell
- Oh! Brothers
- Smacksoft
- Turtles

=== Solo debuts ===
- Cha Tae-hyun
- Dana
- Haneul
- Harisu
- Jang Na-ra
- Kang Sunghoon
- Kangta
- Kim Jong-kook
- Kim Yoon-ah
- Lee Jaijin
- Lucid Fall
- Moon Heejun
- Na Yoon-sun
- Shin Ji
- Sung Si-kyung
- Psy
- Yiruma
- Yoon Mi-rae

=== Disbanded groups ===
- H.O.T.
- Papaya
- Roo'ra

== Releases in 2001 ==
=== January ===
Date	Title	Artist	Genre(s)
12	Psy from the Psycho World!	Psy	K-pop
16	2gether 4ever	Johan Kim	K-pop
19	Reflection of	Nell	Alternative rock
19	Second Story	Park Hyo-shin	Ballad

=== February ===
Date	Title	Artist	Genre(s)
1	Special With...	Lee Ji-hoon	K-pop
3	The Promise	Fly to the Sky	K-pop
7	The Reign	Jinusean	K-pop
8	Never Again	Lee Soo-young	K-pop
12	Accident	Cha Tae-hyun	Unknown
20	4ever Feel So Good	Sharp	K-pop

=== March ===
Date	Title	Artist	Genre(s)
1	LOVE IS...	Pearl	K-pop, R&B, Hip hop
7	Chakra'ca	Chakra	K-pop
13	Discovery	Jewelry	K-pop
15	Perfume	Yangpa	R&B, Ballad
19	Hong Kyung Min 4	Hong Kyung-min	Pop rock
22	The Legend Of...	Drunken Tiger	Hip hop
22	Version 0001	The Jadu	Rock
22	Pia@Arrogantempire.xxx	Pia	Alternative rock
29	G Pop	Eun Ji-won	K-pop

=== April ===
Date	Title	Artist	Genre(s)
3	Click-B3	Click-B	K-pop
13	Melodies & Memories	Fin.K.L	K-pop
19	Like the First Time (처음처럼)	Sung Si-kyung	Pop ballad

=== May ===
Date	Title	Artist	Genre(s)
1	Love Scene	Yiruma	Piano
5	Another Days	Kim Gun-mo	K-pop
10	Fermenta	Toy	Electronica
11	Because of Love (사랑하니까)	Moon Child	rock
22	Violet	Papaya	K-pop
25	Fly	Kang Sung-hoon	K-pop

=== June ===
Date	Title	Artist	Genre(s)
1	Poor Hand Love Song	Crying Nut	Punk rock
4	Sorrow	NRG	K-pop, Ballad
4	Boyish Story	Baby Vox	K-pop
8	Game	JYPark	K-pop, Ballad
13	Tres	Baek Ji-young	K-pop
13	Reflet	Na Yoon-sun	Jazz
18	First Story	Jang Na-ra	K-pop
21	Beautiful Ones	J	R&B, Soul
28	Hey, Come On!	Shinhwa	K-pop

=== July ===
Date	Title	Artist	Genre(s)
4	6ix	Cool	K-pop
5	Four Sisters OST	Various	OST
6	Dusk (그늘)	Yoon Jong-shin	K-pop
7	The Cleo Third	Cleo	K-pop
11	Traveling You	UN	R&B
25	Different Color	Im Chang-jung	K-pop
25	Wild Beauty	Kim Hyun-jung	Dance, R&B
27	Best & Last	Roo'ra	Hip hop

=== August ===
Date	Title	Artist	Genre(s)
9	Fixing My Makeup (화장을 고치고)	Wax	R&B, Ballad
13	The Life	Kim Kyung-ho	Hard rock
16	Voice Of Purity	Haneul	K-pop, Dance
16	Perfect! (딱이야!)	Diva	K-pop
16	You're Welcome (천만에요)	As One	K-pop, R&B
19	Polaris	Kangta	R&B, jazz, ballad, dance-pop
25	Day is Far Too Long	Electron Sheep	Folktronica
27	Forever	Kim Hyun-jung	Dance, R&B
30	New Story	Lee Ki-chan	R&B
31	Infinity	Yoo Seung-jun	Hip hop

=== September ===
Date	Title	Artist	Genre(s)
1	DRRRR!	Delispice	Rock
9	No More Love	Jo Sung-mo	Pop ballad
10	First Album	Dana	K-pop
10	As Time Goes By	Yoon Mi-rae	Hip hop
17	Nineteen Plus One	Hwayobi	K-pop, R&B
20	Sudden Death	Seomoon Tak	Rock
20	New Song & Special	Kim Bum-soo	K-pop
21	A Secret Diary	Yoo Chae-yeong	K-pop
22	Temptation	Harisu	K-pop
26	Speechless	Nell	Alternative rock

=== October ===
Date	Title	Artist	Genre(s)
1	Dreams of Heaven	Song Kwang-sik	Piano
5	Alone	Moon Heejun	K-pop
9	Massmatics	CB Mass	Hip hop
10	K'Pop	K'Pop	K-pop
26	Magic to Go to My Star	Lee Jung-hyun	K-pop

=== November ===
Date	Title	Artist	Genre(s)
1	The First Album	Kiss	K-pop
1	Cheerleading Fan - Sinawe Vol.8 & English Album	Sinawe	heavy metal
5	Flat Album	Sharp	K-pop
6	...지애(之愛) (Agape)	Yoo Young-jin	K-pop
12	II	Choi Jin-young	K-pop
15	Chapter 4	g.o.d	K-pop
19	S.Wing	Lee Jai-jin	K-pop
20	Go! Boogie!	Turtles	Hip hop
20	Shadow of Your Smile	Kim Yoon-ah	Rock
22	Kiss First Album	Kiss	K-pop

=== December ===
Date	Title	Artist	Genre(s)
1	Forever and a Day	Hong Kyung-min	Pop rock
4	Christmas Winter Vacation in SMTOWN.com – Angel Eyes	SMTOWN	K-pop
4	First Love	Yiruma	Piano
6	First Whisper	Cool	K-pop
11	Made in Winter	Lee Soo-young	K-pop
12	Renaissance	Kim Jong-Kook	K-pop
12	Stardom In Future Flow	Cho PD	Hip hop
13	Third Time Fo Yo' Mind	1TYM	Hip hop
14	Egg: Sunny Side Up	Lee Seung-hwan	Pop ballad
17	With Freshness	M.I.L.K.	K-pop
20	Enter the Dragon	jtL	K-pop
27	Incredible / True Image of New	5tion	K-pop
27	Chance	Pearl	K-pop, R&B, Hip hop

== See also ==
- 2001 in South Korea
- List of South Korean films of 2001
