= Two Yoo Project Sugar Man =

South Korean television series

- Promotional poster of season 1
- Genre: Entertainment; Music
- Directed by: Kim Noh-eun, Kim Sol, Shim Woo-ji, Shin Gi-eun, Lee Soo-ah, Baek Soo-jin
- Presented by: Yoo Jae-suk; You Hee-yeol; Kim Eana; Heize
- Country of origin: South Korea
- Original language: Korean
- No. of seasons: 3
- No. of episodes: 72 (list of episodes)

Production
- Executive producer: Yoon Hyun-joon
- Running time: 80 minutes

Original release
- Network: JTBC
- Release: August 19, 2015 – March 6, 2020

Two Yoo Project – Sugar Man (Korean: 투유 프로젝트 – 슈가맨) is a 2015 South Korean television program starring various artists. The original 2-episode pilot aired at 22:50 (KST) on Wednesday (August 19 & 26, 2015) under the name Two Yoo Project Searching For Sugar Man (투유프로젝트 슈가맨을 찾아서). The regular broadcast of Season 1, hosted by Yoo Jae-suk, You Hee-yeol, Kim Eana and Sandara Park, kicked off with the beginning being October 20, 2015, every Tuesday at 22:50 (KST), ended on July 12, 2016.

Season 2 airs starting January 14, 2018, every Sunday at 22:40 (KST). Park Na-rae and Joy (Red Velvet) join as MCs alongside Yoo Jae-suk and You Hee-yeol. The last episode of season 2 was aired on May 27, 2018.

Season 3 is confirmed to air from November 29, 2019, every Friday at 21:00 (KST). Kim Eana, who returns after being one of the MCs for Season 1, and Heize will join as MCs alongside Yoo Jae-suk and You Hee-yeol. The last episode of season 3 was aired on March 6, 2020.

== Synopsis ==
The idea for the program began with the documentary Searching For Sugar Man, which refers to the 2012 Swedish–British documentary about American musician Sixto Rodriguez, who faded into obscurity in the United States but somehow ended up as a megastar in South Africa.

The program revolves around the battle of two teams led by Yoo Jae-suk and Yoo Hee-yeol. Each team will bring back a "Sugar Man": the singer who was a one-hit wonder, but has since disappeared from the public eye. The two teams recreate the old song, "Sugar Song", into new versions which will make them appealing to today's music market. To relive their glory, the songs will be recreated by each producer from each team with today's artist, "Show Man", who are slated to change every episode.

== Cast ==
=== Pilot ===
| | Team Yoo Jae-suk | Team Yoo Hee-yeol |
|---|---|---|
| MC | Yoo Jae-suk; Kim Eana; Chae Jung-an | Yoo Hee-yeol; Heo Kyung-hwan; Jang Do-yeon |
| Producer | Shin Hyuk | Shinsadong Tiger |

=== Season 1 ===
| | Team Yoo Jae-suk | Team Yoo Hee-yeol |
|---|---|---|
| MC | Yoo Jae-suk; Sandara Park (Note: Sandara Park was originally in Yoo Hee-yeol Team. Starting from episode 12, Sandara Park and Kim Eana switched teams.) | Yoo Hee-yeol (Note: Kim Je-dong replaced Yoo Hee-yeol in episode 19 due to Hee-yeol's abroad schedules.); Kim Eana (Note: Kim Eana was originally in Yoo Hee-yeol Team. Starting from episode 12, Kim Eana and Sandara Park switched teams.) |
| Producer | Black Eyed Pilseung (ep. 1, 4, 8, 10, 18, 32); Brave Brothers (ep. 6, 11); Philtre (ep. 2, 3, 5, 9, 13, 17, 20, 26, 36); Yoon Jong-shin (ep. 7); Super Changddai (ep. 12); Dean (ep. 14, 21); Yoo Jae-hwan (ep. 15, 19); Joker (ep. 16, 22, 24, 27, 29, 31, 34, 38); Verbal Jint (ep. 25); Chancellor (Duble Sidekick) (ep. 28); Tenjo (텐조) (ep. 28); Muzie (ep. 30) | Shinsadong Tiger (ep. 1, 8); Sweetune (ep. 2, 3, 10, 11, 18); Don Spike (ep. 5, 6, 9, 12, 16, 21, 27, 34); Toy (ep. 7); 10cm (ep. 4); Bumzu (ep. 13); Woozi (Seventeen) (ep. 13); Rocoberry (ep. 14, 20, 24, 29, 31, 38); Muzie (ep. 15, 19); Jacob (ep. 17, 22); Chancellor (Duble Sidekick) (ep. 25); Jung Yong-hwa (CNBLUE) (ep. 26); Rhymer (ep. 28); Tasco (타스코) (ep. 32); Ra.D (ep. 36) |
| Notes | | |

=== Season 2 ===
| | Team Yoo Jae-suk | Team Yoo Hee-yeol |
|---|---|---|
| MC | Yoo Jae-suk; Joy (Red Velvet) | Yoo Hee-yeol; Park Na-rae |

=== Season 3 ===
| | Team Yoo Jae-suk | Team Yoo Hee-yeol |
|---|---|---|
| MC | Yoo Jae-suk; Kim Eana | Yoo Hee-yeol; Heize |

== List of episodes ==
– Team Yoo Jae-suk
– Team You Hee-yeol

=== Pilot ===
Pilot episode 1 and 2

| Episode # | Broadcast Date | Sugar Man | Sugar Song | Show Man | Winning team |
|---|---|---|---|---|---|
| 1 | August 19, 2015 | Kim Joon-seon | 아라비안 나이트 (Arabian Night) | Hani (EXID) | Jaesuk team |
| 1 | August 19, 2015 | Park Joon-hee | 눈 감아 봐도 (Closing Eyes) | Sojin (Girl's Day), Mad Clown | Jaesuk team |
| 2 | August 26, 2015 | Yoo Seung-beom | 질투 (Jealousy) | Jimin (AOA), John Park | Jaesuk team |
| 2 | August 26, 2015 | Kim Boo-yong | 풍요 속 빈곤 (Poverty Midst Plenty) | Sungkyu (Infinite), Kyungri (Nine Muses) | Jaesuk team |

=== Season 1 ===
List of episodes in season 1

==== 2015 ====
| Episode # | Broadcast Date | Sugar Man | Sugar Song | Show Man | Winning team |
|---|---|---|---|---|---|
| 1 | October 20, 2015 | Mr. 2 | 하얀 겨울 (White Winter) | B1A4 (Note: Performance by Baro and Jinyoung.) | Heeyeol team^{1st} |
| 1 | October 20, 2015 | H | 잊었니 (Did You Forget) | Apink (Note: Performance by Yoon Bo-mi and Kim Nam-joo.) | Heeyeol team^{1st} |
| 2 | October 27, 2015 | Gu Bon-seung | 너 하나만을 위해 (Only for You) | Dynamic Duo | Jaesuk team^{1st} |
| 2 | October 27, 2015 | Juliet | 기다려 늑대 (Wait a Second) | Jessi | Jaesuk team^{1st} |
| 3 | November 3, 2015 | Choi Yong-joon | 아마도 그건 (Perhaps That) | Crush & Loco | Heeyeol team^{2nd} |
| 3 | November 3, 2015 | V.ONE | 그런가 봐요 (I Guess So) | Choa (AOA) | Heeyeol team^{2nd} |
| 4 | November 10, 2015 | Park Joon-ha | 너를 처음 만난 그때 (The First Time I Met You) | Hwang Chi-yeul & Baek A-yeon | Jaesuk team^{2nd} |
| 4 | November 10, 2015 | Emerald Castle | 발걸음 (Step) | 10cm | Jaesuk team^{2nd} |
| 5 (Note: Special appearances by DIA (Yebin, Eunjin, Chaeyeon) and Romeo in the audience.) | November 17, 2015 | Rich | 사랑해 이 말밖엔 (Only the Words That I Love You) | Jonghyun (Shinee) | Jaesuk team^{3rd} |
| 5 | November 17, 2015 | izi (Note: Only the main vocalist Oh Jin-sung appeared.) | 응급실 (Emergency Room) | Jung Seung-hwan | Jaesuk team^{3rd} |
| 6 | November 24, 2015 | J.ae | 어제처럼 (Like Yesterday) | Mamamoo (Note: Performance by Solar and Moonbyul.) | Jaesuk team^{4th} |
| 6 | November 24, 2015 | Kim Min-woo | 사랑일 뿐야 (Just a Love) | f(x) (Note: Performance by Amber and Luna.) | Jaesuk team^{4th} |
| 7 | December 1, 2015 | Miss Mister | 널 위한 거야 (It's for You) | Lena Park | Heeyeol team^{3rd} |
| 7 | December 1, 2015 | Bank | 가질 수 없는 너 (Can't Have You) | Gummy | Heeyeol team^{3rd} |
| 8 | December 8, 2015 | Late Seo Ji-won (Note: Special piano performance by Jung Jae-hyung.) | 내 눈물 모아 (With My Tears) | Lyn | Heeyeol team^{4th} |
| 8 | December 8, 2015 | Late Park Yong-ha (Note: Special piano performance by Kim Hyung-seok.) | 처음 그날처럼 (Like the First Day) | Noel (Note: Performance by Kang Kyun-sung and Jeon Woo-sung.) | Heeyeol team^{4th} |
| 9 | December 15, 2015 | Rumors | Storm | Brown Eyed Girls (Note: Performance by JeA and Gain.) | Heeyeol team^{5th} |
| 9 | December 15, 2015 | Kim Hyun-sung | Heaven | Jo Kwon (2AM) | Heeyeol team^{5th} |
| 10 | December 22, 2015 | Kang Sung | 야인 (Rustic) | Roy Kim | (Tie) |
| 10 | December 22, 2015 | Jung Jae-wook | 잘 가요 (Goodbye) | Huh Gak | (Tie) |
| 11 | December 29, 2015 | Seo Joo-kyung | 당돌한 여자 (Daring Woman) | Twice (Note: Performance by Nayeon, Jihyo, Tzuyu and Chaeyoung.) | Jaesuk team^{5th} |
| 11 | December 29, 2015 | Im Joo-ri | 립스틱 짙게 바르고 (Thick Lipstick) | Lovelyz (Note: Performance by Mijoo, Kei, Jin and Sujeong.) | Jaesuk team^{5th} |

==== 2016 ====
| Episode # | Broadcast Date | Sugar Man | Sugar Song | Show Man | Winning team |
|---|---|---|---|---|---|
| 12 | January 5, 2016 | Ha.E.D | 진이 (Geenie) | Ock Joo-hyun | Heeyeol team^{6th} |
| 12 | January 5, 2016 | Yada | 이미 슬픈 사랑 (Already Sad Love) | Lee Young-hyun (Big Mama) | Heeyeol team^{6th} |
| 13 | January 12, 2016 | Noise | 너에게 원한 건 (What I Wanted from You) | Red Velvet (Note: Performance by Irene, Seulgi, Wendy and Yeri.) | Heeyeol team^{7th} |
| 13 | January 12, 2016 | Noise | 상상 속의 너 (You in My Imagination) | Orange Caramel (Note: Performance by Raina and Lizzy.) | Heeyeol team^{7th} |
| 14 | January 19, 2016 | Mose | 사랑인걸 (It's Love) | iKON (Note: Performance by Bobby, Donghyuk and Ju-ne.) | Heeyeol team^{8th} |
| 14 | January 19, 2016 | Kim Don-gyu | 나만의 슬픔 (My Own Grief) | Homme | Heeyeol team^{8th} |
| 15 | January 26, 2016 | Papaya | 사랑 만들기 (Making Love) | K.Will | Jaesuk team^{6th} |
| 15 | January 26, 2016 | Indigo | 여름아 부탁해 (Summer, Please) | Na Yoon-kwon | Jaesuk team^{6th} |
| 16 | February 2, 2016 | Page | 이별이 오지 못 하게 (So That There's No Goodbye) | Kim Tae-woo (g.o.d) | Jaesuk team^{7th} |
| 16 | February 2, 2016 | Leeds | 그댄 행복에 살 텐데 (You May Live in Happiness) | Kim Bum-soo | Jaesuk team^{7th} |
| 17 | February 9, 2016 | Cha Tae-hyun | I Love You | Jung Joon-young | Jaesuk team^{8th} |
| 17 | February 9, 2016 | Bobo | 늦은 후회 (Late Regret) | Younha | Jaesuk team^{8th} |
| 18 | February 16, 2016 | Goofy (Note: Performance by Lee Seung-kwang, Park Seong-ho and Shin Dong-wook.) | 많이 많이 (Much Much) | U Sung-eun & Truedy | Heeyeol team^{9th} |
| 18 | February 16, 2016 | Ryang Hyun Ryang Ha | 학교를 안 갔어 (I Didn't Go to School!) | Kangnam & Cheetah | Heeyeol team^{9th} |
| 19 | February 23, 2016 | Jung Il-young | 기도 (Prayer) | Ailee | Heeyeol team^{10th} |
| 19 | February 23, 2016 | K2 | 그녀의 연인에게 (To Her Lover) | Jung Eun-ji (Apink) | Heeyeol team^{10th} |
| 20 | March 1, 2016 | Kona | 우리의 밤은 당신의 낮보다 아름답다 (Our Night Is More Beautiful Than Your Day) | Kim Jo-han | Heeyeol team^{11th} |
| 20 | March 1, 2016 | Lee Hyun-seob | My Love | Lim Jeong-hee | Heeyeol team^{11th} |
| 21 | March 8, 2016 | Hey | 쥬 뗌므 (Je t'aime) | Winner (Note: Performance by Minho, Seungyoon and Taehyun.) | Heeyeol team^{12th} |
| 21 | March 8, 2016 | Han Kyung-il | 한 사람을 사랑했네 (I've Loved Just One Person) | Kyuhyun (Super Junior) | Heeyeol team^{12th} |
| 22 | March 15, 2016 | Hwang Kyu-young | 나는 문제 없어 (I Have No Problems) | Lee Hae-ri (Davichi) | Heeyeol team^{13th} |
| 22 | March 15, 2016 | Cha Soo-kyung | 용서 못 해 (Can't Forgive) | Son Seung-yeon | Heeyeol team^{13th} |
| 23 | March 22, 2016 | Mono | 넌 언제나 (You Are Always) | Simon Dominic and Gray | Jaesuk team^{9th} |
| 23 | March 22, 2016 | Juju Club | 나는 나 (I Am Me) | Rose Motel | Jaesuk team^{9th} |
| 24 | March 29, 2016 | Loveholics (Note: Only the ex-member Jisun appeared.) | Loveholic | Gummy | Heeyeol team^{14th} |
| 24 | March 29, 2016 | Flower | Endless | Cha Ji-yeon | Heeyeol team^{14th} |
| 25 | April 5, 2016 | To-Ya | 봐 (Look) | Minah (Girl's Day) | Heeyeol team^{15th} |
| 25 | April 5, 2016 | DIVA | Up and Down | Haha & Skull | Heeyeol team^{15th} |
| 26 | April 12, 2016 | The Nuts (Note: Performance by Kim Hyun-joong, Park Joon-sik, Kim Woo-kyung and Ji Hyun-woo.) | 사랑의 바보 (Love Fool) | Lee Hi | Heeyeol team^{16th} |
| 26 | April 12, 2016 | The Name | The Name | Park Bo-ram | Heeyeol team^{16th} |
| 27 | April 19, 2016 | Esther | 뭐를 잘못한 거니 (What Did I Do Wrong) | Jungyup (Brown Eyed Soul) | Jaesuk team^{10th} |
| 27 | April 19, 2016 | Take (Note: Performance by all current and former members, except Lee Min-hyuk.) | 나비 무덤 (Butterfly Grave) | Lee Seok-hoon (SG Wannabe) | Jaesuk team^{10th} |
| 28 | April 26, 2016 | Banana Girl (Note: Only the ex-member Ahn Soo-ji appeared.) | 엉덩이 (Hips) | I.O.I (Note: Special performance by all I.O.I members with their song "Pick Me". Only Jeon So-mi, Kim Se-jeong and Choi Yoo-jung represented their group in the discussion segment.) | Jaesuk team^{11th} |
| 28 | April 26, 2016 | Chuli and Miae | 너는 왜 (Why Do You) | Jessi & Hanhae (Phantom) | Jaesuk team^{11th} |
| 29 | May 3, 2016 | Son Ji-chang | 사랑하고 있다는 걸 (That I'm in Love) | Lee Yi-kyung | Jaesuk team^{12th} |
| 29 | May 3, 2016 | Na Hyun-hee | 사랑하지 않을 거야 (I Won't Love) | Lee Sung-kyung | Jaesuk team^{12th} |
| 30 | May 10, 2016 | Space A (Note: Performance by Park Jae-goo, Kim Hyun-jung and Jason.) | 섹시한 남자 (Sexy Guy) | Mamamoo | Jaesuk team^{13th} |
| 30 | May 10, 2016 | Riaa | 눈물 (Tears) | V.O.S | Jaesuk team^{13th} |
| 31 | May 17, 2016 | Youme (Note: Special appearance by Kim Jung-eun.) | 사랑은 언제나 목마르다 (Love Is Always Thirsty) | Noel | Heeyeol team^{17th} |
| 31 | May 17, 2016 | Hyeryung | 슬픔을 참는 세 가지 방법 (Three Ways to Endure Sadness) | Homme | Heeyeol team^{17th} |
| 32 | May 24, 2016 | Do Won-kyung | 다시 사랑한다면 (If I Love Again) | Exo (Note: Performance by Chanyeol and Chen.) | Jaesuk team^{14th} |
| 32 | May 24, 2016 | TheThe (Note: Performance by Park Hye-kyung.) | 내게 다시 (To Me Again) | EXID (Note: Performance by Solji and Hani.) | Jaesuk team^{14th} |
| 33 (special) (Note: Each team has two groups of Sugar Man and two groups of Show Man; the Show Man performs the Sugar Song together with their Sugar Man in the opening, along with other songs of the groups of Sugar Man.) | May 31, 2016 | Y2K (Note: Only the member Go Jae-geun appeared.) | 헤어진 후에 (After Breaking Up) | DickPunks (Note: Performance by Kim Hyun-woo and Kim Tae-hyun.) | Heeyeol team^{18th} |
| 33 (special) | May 31, 2016 | S#arp (Note: Only the member Lee Ji-hye and Jang Seok-hyun appeared.) | 스위티 (Sweety) | DinDin & Yoon Bo-mi (Apink) | Heeyeol team^{18th} |
| 33 (special) | May 31, 2016 | UP (Note: Only the member Park Sang-hoo and Kim Yong-il appeared.) | 뿌요뿌요 (Puyo Puyo) | Oh My Girl (Note: Performance by Mimi and Seunghee.) | Heeyeol team^{18th} |
| 33 (special) | May 31, 2016 | Two Two (Note: Performance by Hwang Hye-young, along with two ex-members Oh Ji-hoon and Yoo Hyun-jae.) | 일과 이분의 일 (One and a Half) | Nam Woo-hyun (Infinite) | Heeyeol team^{18th} |
| 34 | June 7, 2016 | The Jadu (Note: Performance by Jadu and ex-member Kang Doo.) | 대화가 필요해 (We Need to Talk) | Son Seung-yeon | Heeyeol team^{19th} |
| 34 | June 7, 2016 | Green Area (Note: Performance by Kwak Chang-seon and ex-member Kwon Seon-kook.) | 준비 없는 이별 (Unprepared Farewell) | Lee Young-hyun (Big Mama) | Heeyeol team^{19th} |
| 35 | June 14, 2016 | Lee Ye-rin | 늘 지금처럼 (Come On Baby Tonight) | Akdong Musician | Jaesuk team^{15th} |
| 35 | June 14, 2016 | Zam (Note: Performance by all members except Jo Jin-soo.) | 난 멈추지 않는다 (Never Stop) | Kwon Jin-ah & Sam Kim | Jaesuk team^{15th} |
| 36 | June 21, 2016 | KISS | 여자이니까 (Because I'm a Girl) | Davichi | Jaesuk team^{16th} |
| 36 | June 21, 2016 | Cleo (Note: Performance by Kong Seo-young, Chae Eun-jung and Kim Ha-na.) | Good Time | Fiestar (Note: Performance by Cao Lu, Linzy and Yezi.) | Jaesuk team^{16th} |
| 37 (special) (Note: Special appearances by Seo Jang-hoon, Sojin (Girl's Day), Chaeyeon (I.O.I/DIA) and Jung Da-bin as representative of 40's, 30's, 20's and 10's spectators.) | June 28, 2016 | F-iV | Girl | (Note: There is no Show Man in this episode.) | (Note: This episode has no voting segment, therefore there are no results.) |
| 37 (special) | June 28, 2016 | Lee Soo-hoon | 고백 (Confession) (Temptation of Wolves OST) | (Note: There is no Show Man in this episode.) | (Note: This episode has no voting segment, therefore there are no results.) |
| 37 (special) | June 28, 2016 | Magolpy | 비행소녀 (Flying Girl) | (Note: There is no Show Man in this episode.) | (Note: This episode has no voting segment, therefore there are no results.) |
| 37 (special) | June 28, 2016 | Lee Jang-woo | 훈련소로 가는 길 (Way to Go to a Training Camp) | (Note: There is no Show Man in this episode.) | (Note: This episode has no voting segment, therefore there are no results.) |
| 37 (special) | June 28, 2016 | KCM | 흑백사진 (Black and White Photo) | (Note: There is no Show Man in this episode.) | (Note: This episode has no voting segment, therefore there are no results.) |
| 38 | July 5, 2016 | Buck | 맨발의 청춘 (Barefooted Youth) | Seo In-young & Kim Tae-woo (g.o.d) | Heeyeol team^{20th} |
| 38 | July 5, 2016 | UN | 선물 (Gift) | Baek A-yeon & Sandeul (B1A4) | Heeyeol team^{20th} |
| 39 | July 12, 2016 | Sugar Man highlights special and a few former Sugar Men's little interviews of their daily lives | | | |

=== Season 2 ===
List of episodes in season 2

| Episode # | Broadcast Date | Sugar Man | Sugar Song | Show Man | Winning team | Ref. |
|---|---|---|---|---|---|---|
| 1 | January 14, 2018 | Young Turks Club (Note: Performance by current members Im Sung-eun, Han Hyun-nam, Choi Seung-min, Park Sung-hyun and Song Jin-ah.) | 정 (Affection) | Gugudan (Note: Performance by Mimi, Hana, Sejeong, Mina and Hyeyeon.) | Jaesuk team^{1st} | (Note: Special appearances via video by Lee Hyori's voice and Lee Sang-soon.) |
| 1 | January 14, 2018 | Lee Ji-yeon | 바람아 멈추어다오 (Wind Please Stop Blowing) | NU'EST W | Jaesuk team^{1st} | (Note: Special appearances via video by Lee Hyori's voice and Lee Sang-soon.) |
| 2 | January 21, 2018 | Position (Note: Performance by Im Jae-wook.) | I Love You | Gummy | Jaesuk team^{2nd} | (Note: Special appearance via video by Seo Min-jung.) |
| 2 | January 21, 2018 | Kim Sang-min | You | MeloMance | Jaesuk team^{2nd} | (Note: Special appearance via video by Seo Min-jung.) |
| 3 | January 28, 2018 | Se Se Se | 떠날거야 (I'm Leaving) | Red Velvet | Heeyeol team^{1st} | |
| 3 | January 28, 2018 | K'Pop | 그림자 (Shadow) | Astro | Heeyeol team^{1st} | |
| 4 | February 4, 2018 | Dog (Note: Performance by Wax and Lee Hyuk-joon.) | 경아의 하루 (Kyung-ah's Day) | Seenroot | Jaesuk team^{3rd} | (Note: Special appearance via video by Go Jae-geun (Y2K).) |
| 4 | February 4, 2018 | Girl (Note: Performance by Kim Se-heon.) | 아스피린 (Aspirin) | Yang Yo-seob (Highlight) & Yun Ddan Ddan | Jaesuk team^{3rd} | (Note: Special appearance via video by Go Jae-geun (Y2K).) |
| 5 | February 11, 2018 | D.Bace (Note: Performance by Jed, Song Ji-hoon, Oh Soo-an and Nam Hyun-joon.) | 모든 것을 너에게 (Everything to You) | iKON | Heeyeol team^{2nd} | |
| 5 | February 11, 2018 | Paran (Note: Performance by PO, Ace, Ryan and AJ.) | 첫사랑 (First Love) | Soyou & Jeong Se-woon | Heeyeol team^{2nd} | |
| 6 | February 25, 2018 | Jinu | 엉뚱한 상상 (Odd Imagination) | Sunny (Girls' Generation) & Henry | Heeyeol team^{3rd} | |
| 6 | February 25, 2018 | Adam | 세상엔 없는 사랑 (A Love That's Not in the World) | Urban Zakapa | Heeyeol team^{3rd} | |
| 7 | March 4, 2018 | KOLA (Note: Performance by Park Joon-hee, Kim Young-wan and Kim Song.) | 우울한 우연 (Gloomy Coincidence) | Mamamoo | Jaesuk team^{4th} | (Note: Special appearances via video by Uhm Jung-hwa and Tzuyu (Twice).) |
| 7 | March 4, 2018 | 7 Princess (Note: Performance by Oh In-young, Hwang Se-hee, Kwon Go-eun, Hwang Ji-woo, Lee Young-yoo, Kim Sung-ryung and Park Yoo-rim.) | Love Song | Oh My Girl | Jaesuk team^{4th} | (Note: Special appearances via video by Uhm Jung-hwa and Tzuyu (Twice).) |
| 8 | March 11, 2018 | Ex (Note: Performance by Lee Sang-mi.) | 잘 부탁 드립니다 (Nice to Meet You) | Cosmic Girls (Note: Only Bona, Exy, Cheng Xiao, Dayoung and Yeonjung represented the group in the discussion segment.) | Heeyeol team^{4th} | (Note: Special appearance via video by Brian (Fly to the Sky).) |
| 8 | March 11, 2018 | 2Shai | Love Letter | Jang Deok Cheol | Heeyeol team^{4th} | (Note: Special appearance via video by Brian (Fly to the Sky).) |
| 9 | March 18, 2018 | Lee Hye-young | 라 돌체 비타 (La Dolce Vita) | Wanna One (Note: Only Ong Seong-wu, Kim Jae-hwan, Kang Daniel, Park Ji-hoon, Bae Jin-young and Lee Dae-hwi represented the group in the discussion segment.) | Jaesuk team^{5th} | (Note: Special appearance via video by Yoona (Girls' Generation).) |
| 9 | March 18, 2018 | Lee Ji-hoon | 왜 하늘은... (Why Is the Sky) | Baek A-yeon & Park Ji-min | Jaesuk team^{5th} | (Note: Special appearance via video by Yoona (Girls' Generation).) |
| 10 | March 25, 2018 | Cult (Note: Performance by Kim Joon-seon, Son Jeong-han and Jeon Seung-woo.) | 너를 품에 안으면 (If I Hold You in My Arms) | GB9 | Jaesuk team^{6th} | (Note: Special appearance via video by Seungri (Big Bang).) |
| 10 | March 25, 2018 | 5tion (Note: Performance by Hwang Sung-hwan, Son Il-kwon, Lee Tae-kyung, Lee Hyun and Oh Byung-jin.) | More Than Words | Davichi | Jaesuk team^{6th} | (Note: Special appearance via video by Seungri (Big Bang).) |
| 11 | April 1, 2018 | Late Kim Sung-jae (Note: Performance by his younger brother, singer Kim Sung-wook.) | 말하자면 (As I Told You) | Monsta X | Heeyeol team^{5th} | (Note: Guest appearances on the discussion segment by Lee Bon and Jini. Special appearance via video by So Ji-sub.) |
| 11 | April 1, 2018 | Late Choi Jin-young (Note: Performance by Jo Jang-hyuk, Kang Hyun-soo and Flower's Go Sung-jin.) | 영원 (Eternity) | B1A4 | Heeyeol team^{5th} | (Note: Guest appearances on the discussion segment by Lee Bon and Jini. Special appearance via video by So Ji-sub.) |
| 12 | April 8, 2018 | Jewelry (Note: Performance by Park Jung-ah, Seo In-young, Ha Joo-yeon and Kim Eun-jung.) | One More Time | Weki Meki (Note: Only Ji Su-yeon, Choi Yoo-jung, Kim Do-yeon and Lucy represented the group in the discussion segment.) | Heeyeol team^{6th} | (Note: Joy did not appear in this episode due to other schedules and was replaced by Seol In-ah as special MC. Special appearance via video by Lee Min-woo (Shinhwa).) |
| 12 | April 8, 2018 | One Two | 자~엉덩이 (Now, Hips) | EXID (Note: Performance by all members except Solji.) | Heeyeol team^{6th} | (Note: Joy did not appear in this episode due to other schedules and was replaced by Seol In-ah as special MC. Special appearance via video by Lee Min-woo (Shinhwa).) |
| 13 | April 15, 2018 | Ann | 혼자하는 사랑 (Love Alone) | Brown Eyed Soul (Note: Performance by Jungyup and Youngjun.) | Jaesuk team^{7th} | (Note: Special appearances in the audience by Tiger JK, Yoon Mi-rae and Bizzy. Special appearance via video by Jin Seon-kyu.) |
| 13 | April 15, 2018 | Lee Ki-chan | 감기 (Cold) | BtoB Blue | Jaesuk team^{7th} | (Note: Special appearances in the audience by Tiger JK, Yoon Mi-rae and Bizzy. Special appearance via video by Jin Seon-kyu.) |
| 14 | April 22, 2018 | Ran (Note: Performance by Jeon Cho-ah) | 어쩌다가 (Somehow) | Sunwoo Jung-a | Jaesuk team^{8th} | (Note: Special appearances via video by Son Ho-young (g.o.d) and Kim Sang-min.) |
| 14 | April 22, 2018 | Lee Jeong-bong | 어떤가요 (How Is It Going) | Jung Seung-hwan | Jaesuk team^{8th} | (Note: Special appearances via video by Son Ho-young (g.o.d) and Kim Sang-min.) |
| 15 | April 29, 2018 | Witches (Note: Yoo Jae-suk's pick. Performance by main vocalist Ha Yang-soo.) | 떳다! 그녀 (There She Is) | None (Note: There is no Show Man in this episode.) | Yoo Jae-suk (Note: Ranking decided based on the difference in predicted number of light bulbs lit and the actual number of light bulbs lit. The lowest difference wins.) | 4 MCs Pick Special |
| 15 | April 29, 2018 | Jang Yeon-joo (Note: Joy's pick.) | Something Special | None | Yoo Jae-suk | 4 MCs Pick Special |
| 15 | April 29, 2018 | Kang Woo-jin (Note: You Hee-yeol's pick.) | Love | None | Yoo Jae-suk | 4 MCs Pick Special |
| 15 | April 29, 2018 | Son Sang-mi (Note: Park Na-rae's pick.) | 헤라의 질투 (Hye-ra's Jealousy) | None | Yoo Jae-suk | 4 MCs Pick Special |
| 16 | May 6, 2018 | EZ-Life | 너 말고 니 언니 (Not You But Your Unnie) | K.Will & DinDin | Heeyeol team^{7th} | (Note: Special appearances via video by Jung Joon-young and Kim Soo-mi.) |
| 16 | May 6, 2018 | Butterfly Effect (Note: Only former main vocalist Bada Kim appeared.) | 첫사랑 (First Love) | Winner | Heeyeol team^{7th} | (Note: Special appearances via video by Jung Joon-young and Kim Soo-mi.) |
| 17 | May 13, 2018 | Tim | 사랑합니다 (I Love You) | Forestella (Note: Performance by Kang Hyung-ho, Jo Min-gyu and Go Woo-rim.) | Jaesuk team^{9th} | (Note: Special appearance via video by Son Ye-jin.) |
| 17 | May 13, 2018 | Kim Hyung-joong | 그랬나봐 (Maybe) | UNB (Note: Performance by Euijin, Feeldog, Go Ho-jung, Jun, Chan and Kijung.) | Jaesuk team^{9th} | (Note: Special appearance via video by Son Ye-jin.) |
| 18 | May 20, 2018 | Yang Dong-geun | 골목길 (Alley) | Bastarz | Jaesuk team^{10th} | (Note: Guest appearance on the discussion segment by Lee Jae-min. Special appearances via video by Sandara Park and Dynamic Duo.) |
| 18 | May 20, 2018 | Jang Na-ra | Sweet Dream | Lovelyz (Note: Only Baby Soul, Mijoo, Kei and Yein represented the group in the discussion segment.) | Jaesuk team^{10th} | (Note: Guest appearance on the discussion segment by Lee Jae-min. Special appearances via video by Sandara Park and Dynamic Duo.) |
| 19 | May 27, 2018 | Solid | 천생연분 (Soul Mates) | Hi Suhyun | Heeyeol team^{8th} | (Note: Joy did not appear in this episode due to other schedules and was replaced by Kim Eana as special MC. Special performance and appearance by KRNFX. The trio of Yoo Jae-suk, Yoo Hee-yeol and Kim Jo-han, named 하우두유둘 (How Do Yoo Dul), have especially re-performed their song "Please Don't Go My Girl" which was released for the first time in MBC's Infinite Challenge's 2013 Freeway Song Festival.) |
| 19 | May 27, 2018 | Solid | 이 밤의 끝을 잡고 (Holding the End of this Night) | Hanhae & Jung Eun-ji (Apink) | Heeyeol team^{8th} | (Note: Joy did not appear in this episode due to other schedules and was replaced by Kim Eana as special MC. Special performance and appearance by KRNFX. The trio of Yoo Jae-suk, Yoo Hee-yeol and Kim Jo-han, named 하우두유둘 (How Do Yoo Dul), have especially re-performed their song "Please Don't Go My Girl" which was released for the first time in MBC's Infinite Challenge's 2013 Freeway Song Festival.) |

=== Season 3 ===
List of episodes in season 3

==== 2019 ====
| Episode # | Broadcast Date | Sugar Man | Sugar Song | Show Man | Winning team | Ref. |
|---|---|---|---|---|---|---|
| 1 | November 29, 2019 | Taesaja | 도 (The Way) | Pentagon (Note: Only Hui, Hongseok, Yeo One and Kino represented the group in the discussion segment.) | Jaesuk team^{1st} | (Note: Special appearances via video by the cast of The Gentlemen's League, Park Sung-woong and Ji Suk-jin.) |
| 1 | November 29, 2019 | Choi Yeon-je | 너의 마음을 내게 준다면 (If You Give Your Heart to Me) | Heize & Colde | Jaesuk team^{1st} | (Note: Special appearances via video by the cast of The Gentlemen's League, Park Sung-woong and Ji Suk-jin.) |
| 2 | December 6, 2019 | Yang Joon-il | 리베카 (Rebecca) | Kim Jae-hwan | Jaesuk team^{2nd} | (Note: Special appearances via video by Lee Seung-hwan and Noh Sa-yeon.) |
| 2 | December 6, 2019 | Lee So-eun | 서방님 (My Husband) | Hoppipolla | Jaesuk team^{2nd} | (Note: Special appearances via video by Lee Seung-hwan and Noh Sa-yeon.) |
| 3 | December 13, 2019 | A.R.T (Note: Performance by Kim Min-soo, Park Sung-joon and Kim Sung-chan.) | 슬픈얼굴 (Sad Face) | Lovelyz | Heeyeol team^{1st} | (Note: Special appearances via video by Shin Dong-yup and Kim Jong-min (Koyote).) |
| 3 | December 13, 2019 | As One | 원하고 원망하죠 (Desire and Resentment) | Daybreak | Heeyeol team^{1st} | (Note: Special appearances via video by Shin Dong-yup and Kim Jong-min (Koyote).) |
| 4 | December 20, 2019 | LPG (Note: Performance by the 1st Generation members Hanyoung, Yeonoh and Yoonah. The 2nd Generation members Sooyeon, Gayeon, Semi, Yumi and Eunbyul have also appeared and performed "사랑의 초인종 (Doorbell of Love)", which would not be the Sugar Song to be performed by the Show Man, Momoland.) | 캉캉 (Can Can) | Momoland | Heeyeol team^{2nd} | (Note: Special appearance via video by Kim Gu-ra.) |
| 4 | December 20, 2019 | 45RPM (Note: Performance by Lee Hyun-bae and Park Jae-jin.) | 즐거운 생활 (Enjoyable Life) | Giant Pink & Kisum | Heeyeol team^{2nd} | (Note: Special appearance via video by Kim Gu-ra.) |

==== 2020 ====
| Episode # | Broadcast Date | Sugar Man | Sugar Song | Show Man | Winning team | Ref. |
|---|---|---|---|---|---|---|
| 5 | January 3, 2020 | Choi Bool-am & Jeong Yeo-jin | 아빠의 말씀 (Father's Words) | Yang Dong-geun & Kim Kang-hoon | Heeyeol team^{3rd} | (Note: Special appearances via video by Yoo Min-sang and Kim Soo-young.) |
| 5 | January 3, 2020 | Kim Kook-hwan & Kim Ki-hyung (Note: Son of Kim Kook-hwan) | 아빠와 함께 뚜비뚜바 (Ddu-bi Ddu-ba with Father) | UV | Heeyeol team^{3rd} | (Note: Special appearances via video by Yoo Min-sang and Kim Soo-young.) |
| 6 | January 10, 2020 | Jang Hyun-chul (Note: Yoo Jae-suk and Ha Sung-woon's pick) | 걸어서 하늘까지 (Walking to the Sky) | None (Note: There is no Show Man in this episode.) | Yoo Jae-suk & Ha Sung-woon (Note: Different from usual episodes, a losing team is chosen instead for this episode. The team which has the lowest number of light bulbs lit will receive a penalty.) | 100 Light Bulbs Special (Note: Guest appearances by Hwang Kwanghee (ZE:A) and Ha Sung-woon (Hotshot) as special MCs. Special appearances via video by the cast of Knowing Bros, Kim Kyung-ho, Lee Guk-joo and Kim Jun-hyun.) |
| 6 | January 10, 2020 | Yang Hye-seung (Note: Kim Eana and Heize's pick) | 화려한 싱글 (Splendid Single) | None | Yoo Jae-suk & Ha Sung-woon | 100 Light Bulbs Special |
| 6 | January 10, 2020 | Gloomy 30's (Note: You Hee-yeol and Hwang Kwang-hee's pick. Performance by vocal Shin Yong-nam.) | 바꿔 (Change) | None | Yoo Jae-suk & Ha Sung-woon | 100 Light Bulbs Special |
| 7 | January 17, 2020 | Freestyle (Note: Featuring Jeong Hee-kyung) | Y | Kwon Jin-ah & Big Naughty | Jaesuk team^{3rd} | Complete Group Special (Note: Special appearances via video by Song Ji-hyo and Kim Young-chul.) |
| 7 | January 17, 2020 | Travel Sketches (Note: Performance by the current members Luka (Jo Byung-seok) and Nam Joon-bong. Former members Moon Hyung-seok, Sung Yoon-yong, Yoon Sa-ra and Lee Seon-ah joined for the medley performance.) | 별이 진다네 (Falling Star) | Solji (EXID) | Jaesuk team^{3rd} | Complete Group Special |
| 8 | January 24, 2020 | Shin Shin-ae | 세상은 요지경 (Crazy World) | Sunwoo Jung-a | Jaesuk team^{4th} | Lunar New Year – Trot Special (Note: Special appearances via video by Lee Dong-hwi and Song Ga-in.) |
| 8 | January 24, 2020 | Moon Joo-ran | 남자는 여자를 귀찮게 해 (Men Bother Women) | Jung Seung-hwan | Jaesuk team^{4th} | Lunar New Year – Trot Special |
| 9 | January 31, 2020 | Kim Jung-min | 슬픈 언약식 (Sad Promise) | Kim Feel | Jaesuk team^{5th} | Back in the Days Special (Note: Special appearances via video by Kim Jong-kook and Park Ji-hoon.) |
| 9 | January 31, 2020 | Kim Won-jun | Show | (G)I-DLE | Jaesuk team^{5th} | Back in the Days Special |
| 10 | February 7, 2020 | Joy-D | 9 to 5 | SF9 (Note: Only Inseong, Jaeyoon, Dawon, Rowoon and Chani represented the group in the discussion segment.) | Jaesuk team^{6th} | Torn Up Special (Note: Special appearance via video by Park Na-rae.) |
| 10 | February 7, 2020 | Jinju | 난 괜찮아 (I Will Survive) | Monni | Jaesuk team^{6th} | Torn Up Special |
| 11 | February 14, 2020 | Marronnier (Note: Performance by Shin Yoon-mi and Kwon In-ha.) | 칵테일 사랑 (Cocktail Love) | GFriend | Heeyeol team^{4th} | Finding That Song Again Special (Note: Special appearance via video by Ha Hyun-woo (Guckkasten).) |
| 11 | February 14, 2020 | The Cross | Don't Cry | N.Flying | Heeyeol team^{4th} | Finding That Song Again Special |
| 12 | February 21, 2020 | Jeong In-ho | 해요 (We Have To) | Younha | Jaesuk team^{7th} | Eardrum Mate Special (Note: Special appearances via video by Song Il-gook and Song Chang-eui.) |
| 12 | February 21, 2020 | SeeYa (Note: Performance by the group's original lineup of Nam Gyu-ri, Kim Yeon-ji and Lee Bo-ram.) | 사랑의 인사 (Love's Greeting) | Jukjae | Jaesuk team^{7th} | Eardrum Mate Special |
| 13 | February 28, 2020 | Lee Soo-young | 라라라 (Lalala) | Soran | Heeyeol team^{5th} | Summon 1999 Special (Note: Special appearances via video by Jang Na-ra and Kian84.) |
| 13 | February 28, 2020 | Kim Sa-rang | Feeling | Hynn | Heeyeol team^{5th} | Summon 1999 Special |
| 14 | March 6, 2020 | Zaza (Note: Performance by the first line-up members Yoo Young and Jo Won-sang.) | 버스 안에서 (In the Bus) | Kei (Lovelyz) & Golden Child (Jangjun & Tag) | Heeyeol team^{6th} | Double 100 Light Bulbs Challenge Special (Note: Special appearances via video by Yoon Do-hyun and Han Hye-jin.) |
| 14 | March 6, 2020 | Jatanpung | 너에게 난 나에게 넌 (Me to You and You to Me) | Jung Eun-ji (Apink) | Heeyeol team^{6th} | Double 100 Light Bulbs Challenge Special |

== Original soundtrack ==
List of OST

OST Part 1

| No. | Title | Lyrics | Music | Arrangement | Length |
|---|---|---|---|---|---|
| 1. | "하얀 겨울 (White Winter)" (Baro & Jinyoung) | Oh Dong-seok | Oh Dong-seok | Black Eyed Pilseung | 2:49 |
| 2. | "잊었니 (Did You Forget)" (Apink BnN (Bomi & Namjoo)) | Kim Se-jin | Kim Se-jin | Shinsadong Tiger | 3:35 |
| Total length: | | | | | 6:24 |

OST Part 2

| No. | Title | Lyrics | Music | Arrangement | Length |
|---|---|---|---|---|---|
| 1. | "너 하나만을 위해 (Only for You)" (Dynamic Duo) | Lee Hyun-do; Dynamic Duo | Lee Hyun-do | Philtre | 3:20 |
| Total length: | | | | | 3:20 |

OST Part 3

| No. | Title | Lyrics | Music | Arrangement | Length |
|---|---|---|---|---|---|
| 1. | "그런가 봐요 (I Guess So) (Piano by Yoo Hee-yeol)" (Choa) | Sweetune | Sweetune | Sweetune; Yoo Hee-yeol | 3:48 |
| 2. | "아마도 그건 (Perhaps That)" (Crush, Loco) | Park Byung-gyu | Park Byung-gyu | Philtre | 3:13 |
| Total length: | | | | | 7:01 |

OST Part 4

| No. | Title | Lyrics | Music | Arrangement | Length |
|---|---|---|---|---|---|
| 1. | "너를 처음 만난 그때 (The First Time I Met You) (Live Ver.)" (Hwang Chi-yeol, Baek A Yeon) | Jeon Sang-jin | Kim Sang-ho | Black Eyed Pilseung | 4:12 |
| 2. | "발걸음 (Step)" (10cm) | Ji Woo | Kim Young-suk | Kwon Jung-yeol; Yoon Cheol-jeong; Lee Yo-han | 4:13 |
| Total length: | | | | | 8:13 |

OST Part 5

| No. | Title | Lyrics | Music | Arrangement | Length |
|---|---|---|---|---|---|
| 1. | "사랑해 이 말밖엔 (Only the Words That I Love You)" (Jonghyun) | Shim Hyun-bo | Miffung | Philtre | 3:57 |
| 2. | "응급실 (Emergency Room)" (Jung Seung-hwan) | Shin Dong-woo | Shin Dong-woo | Don Spike; Choi Min-shik | 4:27 |
| Total length: | | | | | 8:23 |

OST Part 6

| No. | Title | Lyrics | Music | Arrangement | Length |
|---|---|---|---|---|---|
| 1. | "어제처럼 (Like Yesterday)" (Solar, Moonbyul (Mamamoo)) | Yoon Sa-ra | Shim Sang-won | Brave Brothers, JS, Miss Lee | 4:06 |
| 2. | "사랑일 뿐야 (Just a Love)" (Amber, Luna) | Park Joo-yeon | Ha Kwang-hoon | Don Spike; SooNo | 4:13 |
| Total length: | | | | | 8:17 |

OST Part 7

| No. | Title | Lyrics | Music | Arrangement | Length |
|---|---|---|---|---|---|
| 1. | "가질 수 없는 너 (Can't Have You)" (Gummy) | Kang Eun-kyung | Jung Shi-ro | Yoo Hee-yeol (Toy) | 4:06 |
| 2. | "널 위한 거야 (It's for You)" (Park Jung-hyun) | Kim Young-suk | Kim Young-suk | Jung Seok-won | 4:29 |
| Total length: | | | | | 9:16 |

OST Part 8

| No. | Title | Lyrics | Music | Arrangement | Length |
|---|---|---|---|---|---|
| 1. | "처음 그날처럼 (Like the First Day)" (Kang Kyun-sung & Jeon Woo-sung (Noel)) | Kim Hyung-suk | Kim Hyung-suk | Shinsadong Tiger; Jion; Monster Factory | 3:55 |
| 2. | "내 눈물 모아 (With My Tears)" (Lyn) | Kim Hee-tam | Jung Jae-hyung | Black Eyed Pilseung | 4:01 |
| Total length: | | | | | 7:56 |

OST Part 9

| No. | Title | Lyrics | Music | Arrangement | Length |
|---|---|---|---|---|---|
| 1. | "Heaven" (Jo Kwon) | Kang Eun-kyung | Won Sang-woo | Don Spike; Choi Min-shik | 4:37 |
| Total length: | | | | | 4:37 |

OST Part 10

| No. | Title | Lyrics | Music | Arrangement | Length |
|---|---|---|---|---|---|
| 1. | "야인 (Rustic)" (Roy Kim) | Park Hye-sung | Park Hye-sung | Black Eyed Pilseung; Roy Kim | 3:51 |
| Total length: | | | | | 3:51 |

OST Part 11

| No. | Title | Lyrics | Music | Arrangement | Length |
|---|---|---|---|---|---|
| 1. | "립스틱 짙게 바르고 (Thick Lipstick)" (Kei, Ryu Sujeong, Lee Mijoo & Jin (Lovelyz)) | Yang In-ja | Kim Hee-gab | SWEETUNE | 3:46 |
| 2. | "당돌한 여자 (Daring Woman)" (Jihyo, Nayeon, Tzuyu & Chaeyoung (Twice)) | Kang Eun-kyung | Im Kang-hyun | Brave Brothers; Miss Lee | 3:10 |
| Total length: | | | | | 6:56 |

OST Part 12

| No. | Title | Lyrics | Music | Arrangement | Length |
|---|---|---|---|---|---|
| 1. | "진이 (Geenie)" (Ock Joo-hyun) | Choi Soo-jung | Choi Soo-jung | Super Changddai; Ock Joo-hyun | 3:52 |
| 2. | "이미 슬픈 사랑 (Already Sad Love)" (Lee Young-hyun) | Lee Jae-hyuk | Lee Jae-hyuk | Don Spike | 4:13 |
| Total length: | | | | | 8:06 |

OST Part 13

| No. | Title | Lyrics | Music | Arrangement | Length |
|---|---|---|---|---|---|
| 1. | "너에게 원한 건 (What I Wanted from You)" (Red Velvet) | Hong Jong-goo | Chun Sung-il | Philtre | 3:27 |
| 2. | "상상 속의 너 (You in My Imagination)" (Raina & Lizzy) | Kim Chang-hwan | Kim Chang-hwan | Bumzu; Woozi | 3:10 |
| Total length: | | | | | 6:37 |

OST Part 14

| No. | Title | Lyrics | Music | Arrangement | Length |
|---|---|---|---|---|---|
| 1. | "사랑인걸 (It's Love)" (Bobby, Junhoe & Donghyuk (iKON)) | Shim Hyun-bo | Dean | Reone, CRSPH | 4:07 |
| 2. | "나만의 슬픔 (My Own Grief)" (Homme) | Kang Eun-kyung | Lee Kyung-seob | Rocoberry | 4:04 |
| Total length: | | | | | 8:11 |

OST Part 15

| No. | Title | Lyrics | Music | Arrangement | Length |
|---|---|---|---|---|---|
| 1. | "사랑 만들기 (Making Love)" (K.Will) | Lee Hee-seung | Ko Kyu-man | Yoo Jae-hwan | 4:51 |
| 2. | "여름아 부탁해 (Summer, Please)" (Na Yoon-kwon) | Choi Soo-jeong | Choi Soo-jeong | Muzie, Song Sung-kyung | 4:12 |
| Total length: | | | | | 9:03 |

== Ratings ==
In the table below, the blue numbers represent the lowest ratings and the red numbers represent the highest ratings.

=== Pilot ===
List of ratings of pilot episodes

| Episode # | Original airdate | AGB ratings (Nationwide) | TNmS ratings (Nationwide) |
|---|---|---|---|
| Pilot 1 | August 19, 2015 | 2.0% | — |
| Pilot 2 | August 26, 2015 | 1.8% | — |

=== Season 1 ===
List of ratings in season 1

==== 2015 ====
| Episode # | Original airdate | AGB ratings (Nationwide) | TNmS ratings (Nationwide) |
|---|---|---|---|
| 1 | October 20, 2015 | 1.3% | 1.6% |
| 2 | October 27, 2015 | 1.6% | 1.2% |
| 3 | November 3, 2015 | 1.6% | 1.4% |
| 4 | November 10, 2015 | 1.9% | 1.6% |
| 5 | November 17, 2015 | 1.7% | 1.5% |
| 6 | November 24, 2015 | 2.4% | 2.2% |
| 7 | December 1, 2015 | 3.260% | 2.8% |
| 8 | December 8, 2015 | 3.041% | 2.2% |
| 9 | December 15, 2015 | 3.209% | 2.4% |
| 10 | December 22, 2015 | 2.7% | 2.2% |
| 11 | December 29, 2015 | 1.6% | 1.8% |

==== 2016 ====
| Episode # | Original airdate | AGB ratings (Nationwide) | TNmS ratings (Nationwide) |
|---|---|---|---|
| 12 | January 5, 2016 | 3.227% | 2.3% |
| 13 | January 12, 2016 | 2.9% | 2.2% |
| 14 | January 19, 2016 | 2.6% | 2.5% |
| 15 | January 26, 2016 | 2.8% | 2.3% |
| 16 | February 2, 2016 | 2.941% | 2.4% |
| 17 | February 9, 2016 | 3.007% | 4.1% |
| 18 | February 16, 2016 | 2.4% | 3.3% |
| 19 | February 23, 2016 | 2.668% | 3.1% |
| 20 | March 1, 2016 | 2.2% | 2.4% |
| 21 | March 8, 2016 | 2.7% | 2.9% |
| 22 | March 15, 2016 | 2.8% | 3.0% |
| 23 | March 22, 2016 | 2.5% | 2.5% |
| 24 | March 29, 2016 | 3.097% | 3.2% |
| 25 | April 5, 2016 | 3.008% | 3.4% |
| 26 | April 12, 2016 | 3.388% | 3.2% |
| 27 | April 19, 2016 | 2.992% | 2.7% |
| 28 | April 26, 2016 | 3.911% | 4.0% |
| 29 | May 3, 2016 | 3.110% | 4.1% |
| 30 | May 10, 2016 | 3.086% | 3.8% |
| 31 | May 17, 2016 | 2.634% | 3.1% |
| 32 | May 24, 2016 | 2.417% | 3.1% |
| 33 | May 31, 2016 | 2.831% | 2.8% |
| 34 | June 7, 2016 | 2.3% | 3.4% |
| 35 | June 14, 2016 | 1.9% | 2.6% |
| 36 | June 21, 2016 | 2.660% | 3.0% |
| 37 | June 28, 2016 | 2.519% | 2.6% |
| 38 | July 5, 2016 | 3.907% | 4.5% |
| 39 | July 12, 2016 | 2.498% | 2.9% |

=== Season 2 ===
List of ratings in season 2

| Episode # | Original Airdate | AGB ratings | | TNmS ratings |
| Episode # | Original Airdate | Nationwide | Seoul National Capital Area | Nationwide |
|---|---|---|---|---|
| 1 | January 14, 2018 | 4.536% | 5.002% | 6.2% |
| 2 | January 21, 2018 | 3.321% | 3.310% | 4.3% |
| 3 | January 28, 2018 | 3.750% | 4.390% | 5.0% |
| 4 | February 4, 2018 | 4.214% | 4.774% | 5.7% |
| 5 | February 11, 2018 | 3.843% | 4.369% | 5.6% |
| 6 | February 25, 2018 | 2.996% | 3.217% | 4.0% |
| 7 | March 4, 2018 | 4.234% | 5.231% | 5.8% |
| 8 | March 11, 2018 | 3.519% | 4.356% | 4.8% |
| 9 | March 18, 2018 | 3.387% | 3.412% | 4.5% |
| 10 | March 25, 2018 | 3.810% | 4.865% | 4.9% |
| 11 | April 1, 2018 | 4.060% | 4.680% | 5.9% |
| 12 | April 8, 2018 | 4.761% | 6.335% | 5.4% |
| 13 | April 15, 2018 | 3.831% | 4.411% | 5.2% |
| 14 | April 22, 2018 | 3.407% | 4.109% | 4.5% |
| 15 | April 29, 2018 | 4.093% | 4.549% | 5.2% |
| 16 | May 6, 2018 | 3.619% | 4.159% | 4.1% |
| 17 | May 13, 2018 | 3.174% | 3.786% | 4.9% |
| 18 | May 20, 2018 | 3.921% | 4.636% | 5.4% |
| 19 | May 27, 2018 | 3.210% | 3.758% | 5.6% |

=== Season 3 ===
List of ratings in season 3

==== 2019 ====
| Episode # | Original Airdate | AGB ratings | |
| Episode # | Original Airdate | Nationwide | Seoul National Capital Area |
|---|---|---|---|
| 1 | November 29, 2019 | 3.180% | 3.335% |
| 2 | December 6, 2019 | 4.302% | 5.043% |
| 3 | December 13, 2019 | 3.356% | 3.644% |
| 4 | December 20, 2019 | 2.718% | 2.818% |

==== 2020 ====
| Episode # | Original Airdate | AGB ratings | |
| Episode # | Original Airdate | Nationwide | Seoul National Capital Area |
|---|---|---|---|
| 5 | January 3, 2020 | 4.005% | 4.125% |
| 6 | January 10, 2020 | 3.792% | 3.735% |
| 7 | January 17, 2020 | 3.383% | 3.587% |
| 8 | January 24, 2020 | 3.661% | 3.850% |
| 9 | January 31, 2020 | 3.593% | 4.126% |
| 10 | February 7, 2020 | 3.615% | 3.747% |
| 11 | February 14, 2020 | 4.591% | 5.076% |
| 12 | February 21, 2020 | 4.313% | 4.511% |
| 13 | February 28, 2020 | 4.556% | 4.663% |
| 14 | March 6, 2020 | 5.140% | 5.345% |

Note: This show airs on a cable channel/pay TV which normally has a relatively smaller audience compared to free-to-air TV/public broadcasters (KBS, SBS, MBC & EBS).
Note 2: TNmS has stopped publishing their rating reports from June 2018.
