= 2NB =

South Korean R&B duo

- Origin: Seoul, South Korea
- Genres: K-pop, R&B
- Years active: 2006–2012, 2016–present
- Labels: Donuts Culture (2016–present); Friday Entertainment (2006–2012)
- Members: Kim Hyo-jin
- Past members: Heo Sol-ji; Kim Song-yi; Kim Ka-hee; Son Yoo-na

2NB (Korean: 투앤비) is a South Korean R&B duo formed by Friday Entertainment in 2006. The duo consisted of Heo Sol-ji and Kim Song-yi. They released their debut single "The First Fragrance" on March 31, 2006. The group disbanded in 2012. Shortly afterwards, the former became the main singer of the girl group EXID, which debuted that same year. In 2015 Kim Song-yi became the lead singer of the girl group Blady. In 2016, 2NB came back with two new members Son Yoo-na and Kim Hyo-jin.

== Members ==
=== Current ===
- Kim Hyo-jin (2016–present)

=== Former ===
- Heo Sol-ji (2006–2012)
- Kim Song-yi (Gabin) (2008–2012)
- Kim Ga-hee (2006–2007)
- Son Yoo-na (2016–2018)

== Discography ==
=== EPs ===
Title	Album details	Peak chart positions	Sales
Title	Album details	KOR	Sales
Far away (먼 곳만 보네요)	Released: April 24, 2022; Formats: CD, digital download; Track listing: 1. Far away (먼 곳만 보네요); 2. Love of the sky (하늘만큼 사랑해); 3. If I hadn't known you (차라리 그댈 몰랐던 그때로); 4. You Don't Love Me (넌 나를 사랑하지 않아); 5. It hurts to part (이별 참 아프다); 6. Far away (inst.) (먼 곳만 보네요(inst.))	—	
"—" denotes releases that did not chart or were not released in that region.

=== Studio albums ===
Title	Album details	Peak chart positions	Sales
Title	Album details	KOR	Sales
Noonsiwool (눈시울)	Released: February 6, 2008; Formats: CD, digital download; Track listing: 1. Duyeoja Iyagi (두여자 이야기) (Two Women's Story) Feat. Ryu Deok-hwan; 2. Museopjyo (무섭죠); 3. Noonsiwool (눈시울); 4. Naega Neoramyeon (내가 너라면) (If I were you); 5. Igeumeun Yeonaejung (지금은 연애중) Feat. Kim Kyung-wook; 6. Nungama Julgeyo (눈감아 줄게요); 7. Saranghago Saranghaeseo (사랑하고 사랑해서); 8. Greatest Love; 9. Gudeunsal (굳은살); 10. Story; 11. Hanbeonman (한번만); 12. Sonnanno (손난로); 13. Igeumeun Yeonaejung (지금은 연애중) (Club Remix)	—	
2comfortable	Released: November 5, 2009; Formats: CD, digital download; Track listing: 1. Tumyeongingan (투명인간); 2. Black Tears (까만눈물) Feat. JQ; 3. Ppeonhan Yeoja (뻔한 여자) (Obvious Woman); 4. Baby Baby; 5. Yeolbyeong (열병); 6. Hey Boy !!; 7. One My Love; 8. Nungama Julgeyo (눈감아 줄게요) (New Vocal Ver.); 9. Baboya (바보야) by Solji; 10. Miwoseo (미워서) Solji Feat. Suho; 11. Saranghaetdeonnal (사랑했던날) by Solji; 12. Marayo (말아요) by Solji; 13. Miso (미소) by Solji; 14. Yeoja (여자)(New Vocal Ver.) by Gabin; 15. Sarangi Gopeuda (사랑이 고프다) by Gabin	—	
"—" denotes releases that did not chart or were not released in that region.

=== Best albums ===
Title	Album details	Peak chart positions	Sales
Title	Album details	KOR	Sales
Old Memory	Released: April 19, 2016; Formats: CD, digital download; Track listing: 1. Salanghaessdeon Nal (사랑했던 날) by Solji; 2. Jonglo-eseo (종로에서) Solji Feat. PK Heman; 3. Jogeumman Salanghaessdamyeon (조금만 사랑했다면) (If I'd love you just a bit) by Solji; 4. Nungama Julgeyo (눈감아 줄게요) (New Vocal Ver.); 5. Ppeonhan Yeoja (뻔한 여자) (Obvious Woman); 6. Yeoja (여자) (New Vocal Ver.) by Gabin; 7. Salang-i Gopeuda (사랑이 고프다) by Gabin; 8. Yeojainikka (여자이니까) (Because I'm a Girl) feat. G.O; 9. Gieogsog-ui Meon Geudaeege (기억속의 먼 그대에게); 10. Hwajang-eul Gochigo (화장을 고치고) feat. A Brother	—	
"—" denotes releases that did not chart or were not released in that region.

=== Singles ===
Year	Title	Peak chart positions	Sales	Album
Year	Title	KOR	Sales	Album
2006	"Cheotbeonjjaehyanggi" (첫 번째 향기)	—		The First Fragrance
2006	"Jigeumeun Yeonaejung.." (지금은 연애중..)	—		Noonsiwool
2006	"Nungama Julgeyo" (눈감아 줄게요) (feat. EveR2)	—		Noonsiwool
2006	"Sonnanno" (손난로)	—		Noonsiwool
2007	"The First" (무섭죠)	—		Noonsiwool
2007	"Yeojainikka" (여자이니까) (feat. G.O)	—		2NB Remake Single
2007	"Holiday" (with As One)	—		The Rival Season 1 (with As One)
2008	"(사랑은 너 하나뿐)" (feat. G.O, Shogun)	—		The Rival Season 2 (with As One)
2009	"2NB Summer Single: Hey Boy"	—		2comfortable
2010	"Black Tears" (까만 눈물)	—		2comfortable
2010	"Hwajangeulgochigo" (화장을고치고) (feat. A-Brother)	—		2NB Remake Vol.2
2010	"It's You" (그대죠)	—		2nb`s Love
2011	"Joheun Saram Saenggingeoni" (좋은 사람 생긴거니)	—		non-album singles
2012	"Eojjeomyeon Gijeogi Ireonaljido Molla" (어쩌면 기적이 일어날지도 몰라)	—		non-album singles
2012	"Eotteoke Sani" (어떻게 사니)	—		non-album singles
2017	"Naman Malgo, Nado..." (나만 말고, 나도...)	—		non-album singles
2017	"One More Chance" (feat. Rapsta)	—		Love Notebook Part.2
2017	"Eotteon Haru" (어떤 하루)	—		non-album singles
2019	"I Want to Pretend I'm Okay" (잘 지내는 척하고 싶어)	—		non-album singles
2019	"Without You" (이별을 살다)	—		non-album singles
2020	"How Can I Love You" (왜 연락 안 되는 거니)	—		non-album singles
2020	"After This Night" (이 밤이 지나면)	—		non-album singles
2020	"It hurts to part" (이별 참 아프다)	—		non-album singles
2021	"You Don't Love Me" (넌 나를 사랑하지 않아)	—		non-album singles
2021	"Love of the sky" (하늘만큼 사랑해)	—		Love of the sky
2021	"Why Didn't I Know At That Time" (그땐 왜 몰랐을까)	—		non-album singles
2021	"What are you doing now?" (뭐해)	—		non-album singles
2022	"Will I Be Able To Love You Again?" (이제 다시 사랑할 수 있을까)	—		non-album singles
2022	"Far away" (먼 곳만 보네요)	—		Far away
2022	"How Can I Love" (이제는 어떻게 사랑을 하나요)	—		non-album single
2022	"When this heartbreak will end" (얼마나 더 아파해야 이별이 끝이 날까)	—		When this heartbreak will end
2023	"How To Part Ways" (이별하는 법 그런 게 있다면)	—		non-album single
"—" denotes releases that did not chart or were not released in that region.

=== Original Soundtracks ===
Year	Title	Peak chart positions	Sales	Album
Year	Title	KOR	Sales	Album
2008	"Yeoja" (여자)	—		Lawyers of Korea OST Part.2
2010	"Malhaji Moshan Mal" (말하지 못한 말)	—		Queen of Reversals OST
2011	"Ibyeol Cham Apeuda" (이별 참 아프다)	—		Repairer of My Mind OST
2016	"Fall's winds" (가을바람)	—		Fantastic OST
2016	"You Are The One"	—		Second to Last Love OST
2016	"I Still Like You" (그래도 좋아) (feat. Yunwon)	—		Second to Last Love OST
2017	"Pink Pink" (핑크핑크해)	—		Super Family 2017 OST
2017	"It was you" (너였어)	—		Just for You OST
2018	"I'm Fine" (잘 지내) (feat. Yellow Bench)	—		Live Again, Love Again OST
2019	"If I hadn't known you" (차라리 그댈 몰랐던 그때로)	—		Love Interference Season2 OST
2019	"Hey" (있잖아) (feat. Yellow Bench)	—		Love Interference Season2 OST
2019	"It's okay if it's not okay" (안 괜찮아도 괜찮아) (with Siha, Jin hyuk, by me & Yellow Bench)	—		Love Interference Season2 OST
2020	"Tears on a Letter" (종이 위에)	—		Love Interference Season3 OST
2020	"Why Am I Crying Again?" (왜 또 눈물이 나는지)	—		Love Interference Season3 OST
2021	"I'm Fine" (위로가 필요한 나에게) (with by me)	—		Bike Guys OST
2021	"Somehow Love" (왠지 Love)	—		Love Interference 2021 OST
2022	"To the ordinary you" (보통의 이별에게)	—		Love Interference 2022 OST
2022	"Shouldn't have been good to me" (잘해주지나 말지)	—		Secret Lovers OST
2022	"Sleepless Night" (잠이 오지 않는 밤)	—		Beautiful Moment OST
2022	"Someday" (언젠가는)	—		The Listen: The Voices We Love OST
2023	"Turn away" (남이잖아)	—		Love Interference 2023 OST
2023	"All My Love" (나의 모든 사랑을) (with JEON CHUL MIN, by me, Able, Ju Dae Geon, KANG DONGHOON, Sunjin, Seokman Cheon & Sujin)	—		Love Interference 2023 OST
2023	"If I" (펑펑)	—		You & Me & Me X 2NB
2023	"Love Affair" (가져선 안되는 마음)	—		My Dearest OST
2023	"Falling in Love"	—		My Blue Summer X 2NB
"—" denotes releases that did not chart or were not released in that region.

=== Collaborations ===
Year	Title	Peak chart positions	Sales	Album
Year	Title	KOR	Sales	Album
2007	"World Is Yours (2nb with Lee Jae Won feat. Untouchable)	—		JAEWON
2007	"My Grown Up Christmas List" (with W7 Project)	—		Snow Party
2008	"Nunmullo Gieokdoedo.." (눈물로 기억되도..) (Voice Mate feat. Haleen, Oh Yoon Hye, 2NB)	—		Happy Ending
2008	"Happy Ending" (Voice Mate feat. 2NB, Haleen, Oh Yoon Hye, HARU)	—		Happy Ending
2010	"Jugeuldeusi Apeugehae" (죽을듯이 아프게해) (Blue Fish feat. 2NB, 1sagain)	—		Abandoned Pain
2019	"Farewell" (잘 지내) (Yellow Bench, 2NB)	—		GROWING
2023	"Don't say goodbye" (이별만 아니면) (05, 2NB)	—		non-album single
"—" denotes releases that did not chart or were not released in that region.
