= Page (South Korean band) =

South Korean pop group

Page 페이지
- Origin: South Korea
- Years active: 1995 — present
- Label: Yejeon Media
- Members: Lee Ga Eun
- Past members: Oh Hyun Ran; Ahn Sang Ye

Page (Korean: 페이지) is a Korean pop project group. Maronnier member Kim Seon Min did write lyrics for various Page songs.

== Members ==
- Oh Hyun Ran (오현란, vocals, 1995)
- An Sang Ye (안상예, vocals, 1997-1999)
- Lee Ga Eun (이가은, vocals, 2002-)

== Discography ==
=== Albums ===
- 마지막 너를 보내며, 1997
- 2 Page, 1997
- Dear, 1998
- Blue Note, 1999
- Love Is Blue, 2002
- Quella Ragazza e Un Sogno, April 2003
- She Is, November 2004

=== Compilations ===
- Unforgettable, February 2006
