= Day Is Far Too Long =

Studio album by Electron Sheep
- Released: August 25, 2001
- Genre: Folktronica, psychedelic folk
- Length: 49:34
- Label: Moonrise, Dream Beat

Electron Sheep chronology
Day Is Far Too Long (2001)	Forest (2007)

Day Is Far Too Long is the debut studio album by Lee Jongbeom's solo project Electron Sheep, the band that's currently in the form of a four-member. The album was released on 25 August 2001.

== Background ==
Electron Sheep is a project created by Lee Jongbeom to work on a solo project, and at the time of its formation, the band name was Dencihinji, a Japanese notation for Electron Sheep. All the tracks on the album are home recordings produced by him.

== Critical reception ==
Professional ratings
Review scores
Source	Rating
Weiv	7/10

Moon Jeongho of Music Y reviewed "Electron Sheep's music stimulated those who enjoyed music that was not out of trend in the corner of the room, not in the outside, which formed a fairly attractive consensus." Cha Woojin of Weiv described the album as "The format of alternating songs with different moods of the album Day Is Far Too Long does not make noise and melody mixed sounds boring or unfamiliar."

== Track listing ==
No.	Title	Length
1.	"Cheese Moon Travel" ("치즈달 여행")	3:36
2.	"Monochrome Photography" ("흑백사진")	3:53
3.	"Full Moon" ("보름")	4:56
4.	"Sad Song"	2:30
5.	"The day the Moon Fell into the Well" ("달이 우물에 빠진 날")	4:03
6.	"Black Bag" ("검은봉지")	2:30
7.	"Aspirin Boy" ("아스피린소년")	3:27
8.	"Cloud Dance" ("구름의 춤")	1:02
9.	"Canned Food" ("통조림")	5:27
10.	"Mavellous Story"	2:58
11.	"Street Lamp" ("가로등")	4:08
12.	"Rainy Season from Today" ("오늘부터 장마")	2:53
13.	"Who Stole My Pillow" ("누가 내 베개를 훔쳐갔나")	3:02
14.	"Sleep Powder Rain by Jellyfish" ("해파리의 잠가루비")	4:29
15.	"Thanks for the Meal" ("잘먹겠습니다")	0:40
