= Yang Joon-il =

Korean-American singer-songwriter

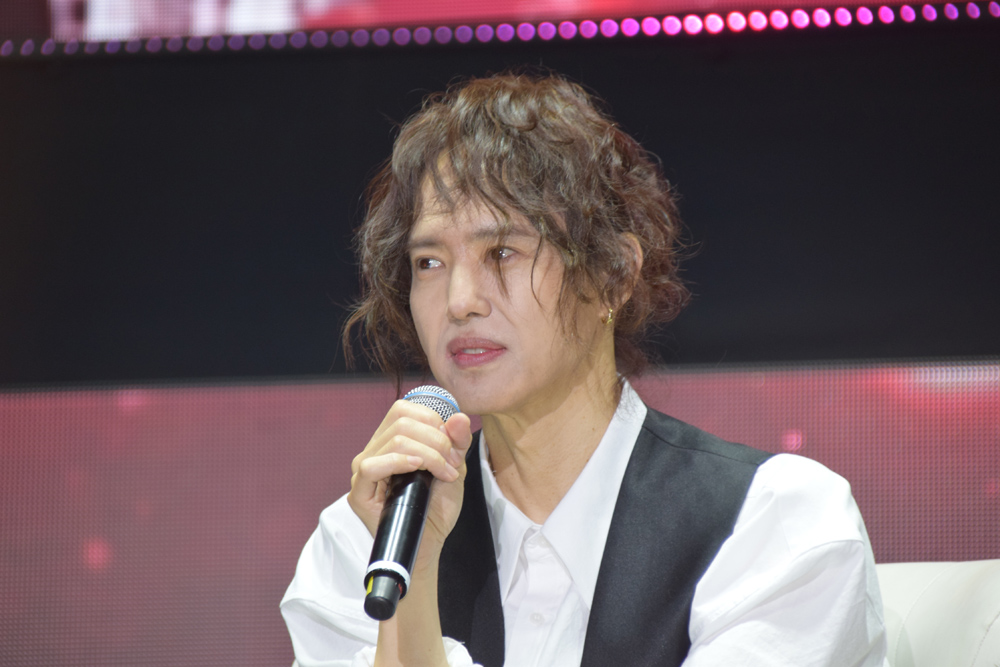
- Park in 2019

Background information
- Also known as: JIY
- Born: August 19, 1969 (age 57); Saigon, South Vietnam
- Origin: United States
- Genres: K-pop, New Jack Swing, Ballad, Dance pop
- Occupations: Singer; songwriter; rapper; producer; author
- Years active: 1991–1993; 2001 (as JIY of V2); 2019–present
- Labels: XBe, Production LEE HWANG, Universal Music

- Yang Joon-il
- Hangul: 양준일
- Hanja: 梁俊日
- RR: Yang Junil
- MR: Yang Chunil

Yang Joon-il (born 19 August 1969), also known as John Yang, Yang Joon Il, Joon-il Yang, JIY and V2, is a Korean-American singer-songwriter. Yang made his debut in 1991 with a song titled "Rebecca". He was active in South Korea from 1991 to 1993 before he had issues renewing his visa. In 2001, he made a brief comeback as JIY, a member of project group V2. The song was a hit, but, at the time, agency issues prevented him from working in the entertainment industry. He got back to America disappearing away from the public scene. He recently gained attention through JTBC's Two Yoo Project Sugar Man, a program dedicated to finding and rediscovering old singers from the past. As of 2020, he is active in various fields such as fan meeting, book writing, public appearances, lectures, commercials, beauty and fashion related activities.

== Personal life ==
Yang was born in Saigon, whose current name is Ho Chi Minh City today, of Vietnam during the war on August 19, 1969. His father used to work for an American travel agency and his mother was a reporter. He spent his childhood in Hong Kong, Japan, and South Korea. Yang emigrated to the United States with his family at age nine and grew up in Los Angeles. He released three albums in Korea between 1991 and 2001. After one year of dating Yang married a woman with whom he fell in love at first sight in 2006 and the first son was born in 2015.

== Career ==
=== Beginning ===
When he was in Glendale High School in LA, he was persuaded to make a debut as an entertainer by the late Hollywood actor Soon-tek Oh, who was a member to the same church. Yang was a soloist in his high school choir. He took classes at a modeling school to prepare for his debut.

He entered University of Southern California Marshall School of Business. During his studies, he was selected by Lee Bum Hee, who was the famous composer of the day in Korea. Yang dropped out of school to debut as a singer in Korea in 1990. He entered Korea in the same year and studied Korean at the Yonsei Korean Language Institute.

=== 1991–1993: First and second album ===
Yang debuted in March 1991 at the age of 21 with the album, "Winter Wonderer(겨울 나그네)". He debuted on the "Rookie Stage" of the MBC's music program "Saturday Night Music Show" performing "Rebecca". The second single was "Help Me Cupid". A few months later, he returned to Los Angeles to work on his 2nd album. His 2nd full-length album was released in 1992. He released other hit songs like "Dance with Me Miss" (1992) and "GaNaDaRaMaBaSa" (1992). Yang also composed most of the songs including "Love Strutter(뚜벅이 사랑)" of Chul Y and Mi Ae(철이와 미애)'s second album.

In 'Back to the Future" in Chul Y and Mi Ae's 2nd album dance pop and Korean traditional music were combined, which was very innovative attempt at the time.

Active in South Korea from 1991 to 1993, he suddenly disappeared from the public scene and returned to the U.S. In a 2019 interview with The Korea Times, he revealed that "he was hated by many for his unusual looks and songs." Some also threw rocks during his performance at an open-air stage. Once, Yang recalled, an audience member faked a handshake to pull him violently down to the ground from the stage, telling him: "You need a beating." While a 10-year visa he held in Korea as a U.S. national had to be recertified every six months, but he was denied an extension to his visa. His nationality as an American also made it hard for him to gain acceptance in South Korea.

=== 2001: Third album, promoting as JIY of V2 ===
On April 17, 2001, he made another debut as JIY, a member of a music band V2, with a third album "Fantasy". V2 meant his "Version 2". He was in active under the name of JIY instead of his real name, Yang Joon-il. He lied about his age and made a big change in his look. His new song "Fantasy", composed by Valery Gaina of Cruise, enjoyed a brief popularity before he finally put an end to his music career. Due to the agency's circumstances, it became impossible to work as a musician and after that he worked as an English teacher for 14 years. In 2015, he returned to the United States. Because of his age, he had a hard time finding work. He worked as a warehouse worker, office cleaner, and restaurant server.

=== 2019: Comeback with Sugar Man ===
In 2019, he gained attention through JTBC's Two Yoo Project Sugar Man, a program dedicated to finding and rediscovering old singers from the past. He sang "Rebecca", "GaNaDaRaMaBaSa", "Dance With Me Miss", and "Fantasy". Still slim in figure and soulful in his performance, he dazzled the audience and show hosts. When asked his next plans amid this viral syndrome, he simply said: "I don't make any plans; I just focus on fully living every moment. If there's any plans, I hope to live as a humble husband and dad." When the show hosts asked him to give a message to 20-year-old himself living 30 years ago, Yang said: "I know nothing will happen how you want. But don't worry, everything will come out perfectly in the end." After his fame skyrocketed again after his appearance on the show, he quit his job at the restaurant to focus on his entertainment career.

On December 25, Christmas Day, he appeared on JTBC Newsroom. He said "It's like a dream every day", "I've been trying to get rid of my prejudice against myself, which is full of my mind as if I had to abandon my unhappiness before I was happy." "There are no more tears" Yang said, adding that his powerful fandom, which claims to be a support group, is also a big boost to Yang.

On December 31, Yang met with fans through two official fan meeting events. "Are you really here to see me?"he said, tearing up with joy. "This is my first time. I didn't imagine any of this. I'm so grateful."

Just a few days before the fan meeting he shot a commercial with Lotte Home Shopping for the first time in his life. He spent that money to rent an apartment in Korea.

On January 3, 2020, Yang created his account on Instagram. On the 4th, he performed his debut song "Rebecca" on MBC's "Show! Music Core" after 28 years after his debut. Yang appeared himself a fan video, a parody of his own 90's fashion style. JTBC's special feature <Sugar Man, Yang Joon-il, 91.19> aired on the 16th and 23rd. The title of the program is meant to commemorate his debut year, 1991 and 2019 when he was recovered.

On February 3, his photo essay [Yang Joon Il Maybe] started a pre-sale. On the first day, over 15,000 copies were pre-sold and it became bestseller. A series of the interviews with the behind-the-scenes of photo shooting for his book was released also. On the 9th, Yang opened his official YouTube channel, Official Yang Joon Il. The number of subscribers has spiked up to over 15K in a single day. On Valentine's Day, on February 14, [Yang Joon Il Maybe] was officially released.

On March 14, the 100th day anniversary of his re-debut, Yang and choreographer Lia Kim appeared on MBC "Show! Music Core" of the via a collaboration stage. Two of them went on stage with his song "Dance with Me" released in 1992. On the 16th, Yang was shown as a lecturer on "Sebasi Talk". The title of the lecture was <Message to unhappy people in competition>. It hit 1 million view mark in 2 days.

On April 28, Yang held a Drive-through Fansign Event in Paju Premium Outlet.Drive-thru Fansign

On May 12, his KaKaoTalk emoticons, I Got Yang Joon Il has been launched. On the 15th, Yang Joon Il Maybe: Password of You and I eBook has been released. On the 19th, Yang Joon Il Maybe: Password of You and I Audiobook narrated by Yang Joon Il himself has been released.

Yang signed a contract with Production Lee Whang . According to Production Lee Whang, the agency has formed with Yang's one-man agency XBe and will be in charge of promoting his songs and managing his schedule.

The remastered first and second album on vinyl LP are pre-sold from August 5 to 19 and released in October. Yang and Shinsegae International's collaboration goods are sold in limited quantities starting August 17. His new song "Rocking Roll Again" teaser was released on the 13th.

On August 19, which is also his 51st birthday, [Yang Joon Il Maybe Special Edition] was published. It is re-edited with over 40 illustrations by Yulla and a new message by Yang is added. "Rocking Roll Again" was released.

On August 28, Sinsegae International and Yang launched their women's 2020 F/W collection and opened pop-up retail.

A solo concert "The First Dance" was scheduled for September 19. Yang was scheduled to appear at the "Blue Spring Festival" held from September 26 to 27. "The First Dance" concert scheduled to be held in Seoul September was cancelled due to COVID-19. The "Blue Spting Festival" was also cancelled. The JTN Concert, which was scheduled to be held in May but was cancelled due to COVID-19, was announced to be held on December 5.

== Discography ==
=== Album ===
겨울 나그네 (1991) — produced by Lee Bum-hee (이범희)
Title	Author	Composer/Lyricist	Arranged by	length
겨울 나그네 ("Winter Wonderer")	Lee Sung-man (이성만)	Lee Bum-hee (이범희)	Lee Bum-hee	3:29
헬프 미 큐핏 "Help Me, Cupid!"	Kang Duk-hee (강덕희)	Lee Bum-hee (이범희)	Lee Hyung-tak (이형탁)	3:46
오월의 교정 ("School Campus in May")		Lee Bum-hee, Kwon Hye-kyung(권혜경)	Lee Hyung-tak	3:39
리베카 "Rebecca"	Yang Joon-il (양준일)	Lee Bum-hee (이범희)	Lee Hyung-tak	3:58
강변의 한 사람 ("A Person by the Riverside")	Lee Sung-ha (이성하)	Lee Sung-ha (이성하)	Lee Hum-hee	3:50
재수생 ("Repeater")	Lee Dong-hyun (이동현)	Lee Bum-hee (이범희)	Lee Hyung-tak	4:22
졸업과 이별과 친구 ("Graduation and Goodbye and Friend")	Lee Bum-hee (이범희)	Lee Bum-hee (이범희)	Lee Hyung-tak	4:00
"So Insane"	Yang Joon-il (양준일)	Lee Bum-hee (이범희)	Lee Hyung-tak	3:48

나의 호기심을 잡은 그대 뒷모습 Your Backside That Caught My Attention (1992) - Produced by P.B.Floyd/Lee Bum-hee
title	written by	composed by	arranged by	length
"Your Backside That Caught My Attention" ("Do It to Me")	Yang Joon-il	P.B. Floyd, Jay Mitchel, Michael Johnson/Yang Joon-il	Jay Mitchell	3:24
Dance with me, 아가씨 ("Dance with me, Miss") M/V	Yang Joon-il	P.B. Floyd, Jay Mitchell/Yang Joon-il	Jay Mitchell	3:33
"Party Invitation"	Yang Joon-il	P.B. Floyd, Rafael Cunville/Yang Joon-il	Jay Mitchell	4:39
가나다라마바사 ("ABCDEFG")	Yang Joon-il	P.B. Floyd, Jay Mitchell/Yang Joon-il	Jay Mitchell	4:06
추억만의 사랑 ("Loving In My Memories")	이동현/Lee Se-gun(이세건)	이세건/Lee Dong-hyun(이동현)	Charlie S. Lee	4:44
J에게 ("To J")	Lee Se-gun(이세건)	Lee Se-gun(이세건)	Yang Joon-il, Jay Mitchell	3:43
그리움 ("Yearning")	Yang Joon-il	Lee Bum Hee(이범희)	Charlie S. Lee	4:43

Fantasy (April 17, 2001) — Produced by Val Gaina (Kruiz)
Titles	Written by	Composed and arranged by	Length
"Fantasy" M/V	Yang Joon-il	Yang Joon-il, Val Gaina	3:55
"Goodbye"	Yang Joon-il	Yang Joon-il, Val Gaina	3:21
"True Love"	Yang Joon-il	Yang Joon-il, Val Gaina	3:54
"Do You Speak English?"	Yang Joon-il	Yang Joon-il, Val Gaina	3:34
너의 이유	Yang Joon-il	Yang Joon-il, Val Gaina	3:54
외로움	Yang Joon-il	Yang Joon-il, Val Gaina	3:46
왔다갔다 ("Come and Go")	Yang Joon-il	Yang Joon-il, Val Gaina	4:45
우리만의 여행 ("A Trip for the Two of Us")	Yang Joon-il	Yang Joon-il, Val Gaina	2:46
"Oh My God"	Yang Joon-il	Yang Joon-il, Val Gaina	3:37
"Because"	Yang Joon-il	Yang Joon-il, Val Gaina	4:25
"Fantasy" [Remix]	Yang Joon-il	Yang Joon-il, Val Gaina	3:46
"Do You Speak English?" [Remix]	Yang Joon-il	Yang Joon-il, Val Gaina	3:37
"Goodbye" [Instrumental]		Yang Joon-il, Val Gaina	3:18
"True Love" [Instrumental]		Yang Joon-il, Val Gaina	3:45

=== Single ===
"Rocking Roll Again" (August 19, 2020) - Yang Joon-il/Val Gaina - 4:10

== Bibliography ==
- Yang Joon Il MAYBE-Password of You and I (양준일 MAYBE-너와 나의 암호말) (2/14/20) - Memoir. Photo Essay. Co-authored by Yang Joon-il and Icecream. Photo by Kim Bo-ha Published by Mobidicbooks
- Yang Joon Il MAYBE: Password of You and I Voiced by Yang Joon-il (JIY) (English Edition-5/19/20, Korean Edition-5/19/20, Korean-English Edition-5/21/20 Varies by region Teaser) - Serviced on Storytel.com
- Yang Joon Il MAYBE Special Edition greeting from author JIY and illustrator Yulla- Co-authored by Yang Joon-il and IceCream. Illustrated by Yulla (율라). Photo by Kim Bo-ha. Published by Mobidicbookks.

== Appearances ==
1991–2001
Year	Titles	Media	Ref.	Notes
1991	Saturday Night Music Show (토요일! 토요일은 즐거워)	MBC		"Rebecca" - Debut Stage
1991	한바탕 웃음으로	KBS2		"Help Me Cupid"
1992	특종 TV 연예	MBC		"Dance With Me" - 2nd Album Comeback Stage
2001	Live 生生 Show	Comedy TV		"Fantasy" - Guidance

2019–present
Year	Title	Media	Role	Ref.	Notes
2019	Two Yoo Project Sugar Man Season 3 Ep.2	JTBC	Guest		#1 #2
2019	JTBC Newsroom Culture Invitation(문화초대석)	JTBC	Guest		Full
2020	The Sugar Man, Yang Joon-il, 91.19	JTBC	Himself		#1 #2
2020	Yang Hee-eun and Seo Kyung-seok's Women Era - Visible Radio	MBC표준FM			Full
2020	Oh Eun's Huddle(옹기종기) on Yes24 Podcast(책읽아웃)-Visible Podcast	YouTube			Ep.122 Full
2020	Lee Soo-young's Let's Meet at 12:00 (열두시에 만납시다) - Visible Radio	CBS음악FM	Guest		#1 #2 #3 #4 #5
2020	Bae Cheol-soo Jam Ep.3, Ep.4	MBC	Guest		#1 #2 #3 #4 #5
2020	Happy Together Ep.631	KBS	Guest		Part1 Part2
2020	Park Myung-soo's Radio Show <Delicate World of Profession with JIY>	KBSCoolFM			Full
2020	Sebasi Talk <Message from JIY to the Unfortunate People in Competition>	CBS TV	Lecturer		Ep.1152 Full
2020	[Announcers' Bookstore(아나운;서점)] <JIY interview with Yoon Hyun-jin>	YouTube			Ep.1 Ep.2 Ep.3
2020	Yun Go-eun's EBS Book Cafe] (윤고은의 EBS 북카페) with Yang-Visible Radio	EBS Radio			Full(From 42:41)
2020	449tv FaTalk (패톡) by Sinsegae International	YouTube			#1 #2 #3-1 #4-1
2020	Rebooting JIY <Reboot Project> <JIY Consultation>	YouTube	Himself		Teaser
2020	Show! Music Core <Yang Joon Il Trilogy>	MBC			#1 #2XLiaKim #3
2020	Video Star Ep.204 <Rare Item Special; Log In with your Main Character>	MBCevery1			#1#2#3#4#5
2020	449tv Talk Show Yang Joon Il Diary(양준일기)	YouTube	Host		Teaser #1-1 #2-1
2020	Comeback Stage @ Show! Music Core with "Rocking Roll Again"	MBC			FanCam
2020	Singlbungl Radio Show - Visible Radio	MBC표준FM	Guest		Full
2020	Lim Baek-chun's Baek Music - Visible Radio	KBSHappy			Self-cam
2020	Yoon Jung-soo and Nam Chang Hee's Mr. Radio - Visible Radio	KBSCoolFM	Guest		Full
2020	Behind the Scene: The Reader - JIY, Lia Kim, Eric Nam by Melon x Storytel x COEX	Melon			Full
2020	Problem Child in House	KBS World			#1 #2 #3 #4

== Concerts ==
- Party Invitation '93 at Viva Art Hall, Seoul (June 26–27, 1993)
- A Gift of JIY (양준일의 선물) at Daeyang Hall, Seoul (December 31, 2019)

== Other ventures ==
=== Endorsements ===
In 2019, Yang shot a commercial with Lotte Home Shopping for the first time in his life.

In 2020, Yang came in third place in brand reputation rankings for male advertisement models, as studied by The Korean Business Research Institute. Yang became an official model for Pizza Hut. He was selected as an endorsement model for Siwon School. He has been working as an ambassador for Shinsegae International. It was also reported that Shinsegae International is planning to launch a collaborative product with Yang. He appeared in commercials for Berocca by Bayer Korea. He was appointed as a new face of Jenny House Cosmetics. Jenny House Cosmetics announced to release a new product in collaboration with Yang. Re;BAK Style Repair Shampoo and Treatment was officially launched in March and Rebecca Salon, their collaboration site, was opened on the same day. On August, Shinsegae International launched "449 Project Yang Joon Il Goods line" which was produced on the theme of 'Life.Walker', Yang's values. S.I. and JIY's collaborative womenswear line was released on S.I. Village and at pop-up stores in Shinsegae Department Store.

== Awards ==
- 2019 The Fact Music Awards — Special Prize acceptance speech
- 2020 Brand Customer Loyalty Award — Hot Icon acceptance speech
