= King of Noise =

EP by Electron Sheep
- Released: September 30, 2015
- Genre: folk, electronica
- Length: 24:36
- Language: Korean
- Label: Self-released
- Producer: Electron Sheep

Electron Sheep chronology
Forest (2007)	King of Noise (2015)	Dungeon (2017)

King of Noise (Korean: 소음의 왕; RR: Soeumeui Wang) is an extended play (EP) by South Korean folktronica band Electron Sheep. It was released on September 30, 2015, and is the first album of Electron Sheep as a band.

== Background ==
After their second album Forest released in 2007, Lee Jongbeom's solo project Electron Sheep announced that he would return to the band form after the hiatus, and Lee said he decided to form a band around the time he thought about the performance. They announced the release of their new album, beginning with the release of their single Kung Kung (쿵쿵) in April 2015.

== Critical reception ==
The album was released to high critical acclaim. Cho Jihwan of Weiv described the album as "King of Noise is an album that has undergone quite a radical change, and a style that is not common in Korea", and the webzine ranked it 8th in its Korean Albums of the Year 2015 list. The selection committee for 2016 Korean Music Awards Park Byeongwoon described the album as more bizarre and more beautiful, and above all, it gave a sentimental and wonderful finish.

== Track listing ==
All music written by Electron Sheep.

No.	Title	Length
1.	"Gigantic (거인)"	1:31
2.	"We Are Family (우리는 가족)"	5:29
3.	"Light Of Life (생명의 빛)"	3:46
4.	"King Of Noise (소음의 왕)"	4:53
5.	"The Wave Named The End / Campfire (멸망이라는 이름의 파도 / 캠프파이어)"	8:55
