= Marronnier (group) =

1990s South Korean band

- Origin: South Korea
- Genres: Pop
- Years active: 1989 – 1998
- Past members: Producer Kim Seon-min, Shin Yoon-mi, Kwon In-ha, Hwang Chi-hoon, Choi Sun-Won, Kim Shin-Woo, Kim Min-kyoung, Kim Ji-young, Lee Hyeon-uk

Marronnier (마로니에) is a South Korean pop/ballad project group mostly active in the 1990s. Their song "Cocktail Love" was sung by guest singers Shin Yoon-mi, Choi Sun-won and Kim Shin-woo of Marronnier's third album released in 1994. "Cocktail Love" got huge popularity right after its release. However, the improvised group performed lip syncing with songs by Shin Yoon-mi and Choi Sun-won. The group in the Cocktail Love music video didn't sing at all on Marronnier's third album. There was a legal dispute between the record label because they stole Shin Yoon-mi's voice and arrangement rights. Shin Yoon-mi sang "Cocktail Love" live in court to prove her rights. Shin Yoon-mi won a copyright lawsuit against record label and regained 'Moral Rights of singers' and 'copyright for chorus arrangement'.

Shin Yoon-mi and Kwon In-ha appeared on the 11th episode of "Two Yoo Project Sugar Man" in 2020.

"Cocktail Love" has been covered by Turtles, Seo Young-eun featuring Kim Youn-woo, and GFriend.

== Members ==
- 1st Album: Kim Seon-min (김선민), Kwon In-ha (권인하), Shin Yoon-mi (신윤미)
- 2nd Album: Hwang Chi-hoon (황치훈), Kim Sa-mi (김사미), Lee Yun-seon (이윤선), Yu Ju-hui (유주희)
- 3rd Album: Shin Yoon-mi (신윤미), Choi Sun-Won (최선원), Kim Shin-Woo (김신우)
- 4th Album: Kim Min-kyoung (김민경), Kim Ji-young (김지영), Sin Yu-sang (신유상), Won Woo-hyuk (원우혁)
- 5th Album: Kim Min-kyoung (김민경), Kim Ji-young (김지영), Won Woo-hyuk (원우혁), Lee Hyeon-uk (이현욱)
- 6th Album: Kim Min-kyoung (김민경), Kim Ji-young (김지영), Lee Hyeon-uk (이현욱)
- 7th Album: Kim Ji-young (김지영), Yang Jun-seok (양준석), Lim Seung-seon (임승선)

== Discography ==
=== Albums ===
- 비를 기다리는 사람들 / 동숭로에서···, 1989
- 혼자 남는 법/안개꽃 꽃말은 슬픔, 1992
- 마로니에 3 - Cocktail Love, 1994
- 마로니에 '95 - 진실게임, 1995
- 마로니에 '96 - 큐피트의 화살, April 1996
- 마로니에 '97, May 1997
- 마로니에 '98, 1998

=== Compilations ===
- 마로니에 - The best, December 2002
