= Tim (singer) =

American singer

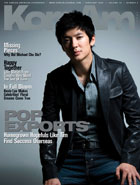
- Tim on the cover of KoreAm, February 2008

Background information
- Born: Hwang Young-min; December 23, 1981 (age 44); Philadelphia, Pennsylvania, U.S.
- Genres: Korean ballad, R&B
- Occupation: Singer
- Years active: 2003–present
- Spouse: Kim Bo-ra (m. 2020)

- Korean name
- Hangul: 황영민
- RR: Hwang Yeongmin
- MR: Hwang Yŏngmin

Hwang Young-min (Korean: 황영민; born December 23, 1981), best known as Tim (팀), is a Korean-American singer based in South Korea. He is referred to as South Korea's "ballad prince". He debuted in 2003 with the album, First Tim, which included the hit ballad, "I Love You".

== Life and career ==
=== Early life and works ===
Tim was born in Philadelphia and raised just west of the city in Upper Darby to a Christian family with his father as a pastor for a local church, and has four brothers. He was exposed to a musical environment early on as a child. At his father's church, he naturally learned to play various instruments like the saxophone and piano. Throughout his childhood, Tim pursued musical activities in both schools and churches, as a member of the church choir and a saxophonist in the school jazz band. However, until he was picked up by an entertainment agency, he had never thought of becoming a professional singer. During his high school career, Tim also modeled and acted.

Prior to his singing debut, however, Tim was in charge of an MTV Korea program called Tim's World (started on December 2, 2002) which showed documentaries on the path and struggles of new singers like himself.

=== Debut ===
The story told as by Tim has it that at the age of 20, Tim was approached by a Korean pop music producer (the son of a fellow church member). After listening to a tape, it was requested that Tim fly to Korea for a full audition to make a debut as a pop singer in Korea. Though he and his family had a very conservative background, Tim decided to fly to Seoul alone for the first time, give up his life as a college student and try his hand at becoming a Korean pop singer. Having never had visited Korea until he graduated high school, Tim spent the first two years in Korea focusing on learning the Korean language and preparing for his debut as a singer. While training for his debut album, Tim was very fortunate to have met Yoon Sang, one of the top songwriters in Korea and also a great senior and mentor as a singer. Yoon Sang wrote "I Love You" (사랑합니다), a soft ballad that matches Tim's voice and image perfectly. Tim was supported by Yoon Sang in creating his musical style, and his debut album (released April 21, 2003 by Yejeon Media) received great response. Tim began gaining great recognition in the local pop music market when senior ballad singers like Shin Seung Hun commented favorably on Tim's music. His second album Second Breath was able to mirror the success of his first album with the hits "Gomawottago. .. (I Was Thankful)" and "Iyagi (The Story)".

He has since appeared on a number of Korean variety shows such as Love Letter, Strong Heart, X-Man, Star Golden Bell, and Heroine 6, and TV series Saranghae, I Love You (2012) with Revalina S. Temat.

== Personal life ==
In 2020, Tim married businesswoman Kim Bo-ra, with whom he had been in a relationship for 8 years. Later, on March 29, 2022, his wife gave birth to their first son.

== Discography ==
=== Studio albums ===
Title	Album details	Peak chart positions	Sales
Title	Album details	KOR	Sales
First Tim	Released: March 1, 2003; Label: Yejeon Media; Formats: CD, cassette; Track listing: 1. "사랑합니다..."; 2. "가끔씩 눈물이 나죠"; 3. "Yes"; 4. "재회"; 5. "아픈 다짐"; 6. "넌 착한 사람"; 7. "Always"; 8. "예전처럼"; 9. "Bye Bye Love"; 10. "Hey Girl"; 11. "Party"	— (Note: First peaked at number 19 on MIAK's monthly chart in May 2003.)	KOR: 28,422+
Second Breath	Released: June 1, 2004; Labels: JM Entertainment, EMI Korea; Formats: CD, cassette; Track listing: 1. "이야기"; 2. "Daydream"; 3. "고마웠다고"; 4. "난 어떻게"; 5. "사랑의 길을 잃다"; 6. "오랜만에"; 7. "Morning Star"; 8. "I'm Sorry"; 9. "너에게만은"; 10. "우정"; 11. "아버지께"; 12. "자장가"	— (Note: Second Breath peaked at number 5 on MIAK's monthly chart in June 2004.)	KOR: 31,624+
감성	Released: April 28, 2006; Labels: Yedang Entertainment; Formats: CD, cassette; Track listing: 1. "Intro"; 2. "하루새..."; 3. "조심하세요..."; 4. "폴라리스"; 5. "내가 아니죠"; 6. "나 혼자만"; 7. "내게 와줘요"; 8. "너의 뒤에서"; 9. "We Are the Reason"; 10. "꿈 속에서..."	— (Note: 감성 peaked at number 9 on MIAK's monthly chart in April 2006.)	KOR: 13,002+
Love is...	Released: October 24, 2007; Label: LOBE Entertainment, Seoul Records; Formats: CD, cassette; Track listing: 1. "내 마음 사용 설명서"; 2. "고마운 기적"; 3. "혼잣말"; 4. "내 안의 전쟁"; 5. "사랑한 만큼"; 6. "Serendipity"; 7. "Wish List" (소망상자); 8. "애착"; 9. "후회하지 않아요"; 10. "그댄 나에게"; 11. "즐거운 인생" (feat. Son Ho-young and Danny Jung); 12. "Walk on Water"	— (Note: Love is... peaked at number 16 on MIAK's monthly chart in December 2007.)	KOR: 14,625+
New Beginnings	Released: November 25, 2010; Label: Sony Music Korea; Formats: CD, digital download; Track listing: 1. "난 너 때문에"; 2. "그대여"; 3. "River Flows in You" (by Yiruma); 4. "다음 역에선"; 5. "Love Song" (with Lyn); 6. "남자답지 못한 말"; 7. "Missing U"; 8. "닭살 커플" (with Esna); 9. "이별을 배우다"; 10. "Liquid"; 11. "He Said, She Said (No Other Way)" (with Esna)	4	—N/a
"—" denotes album did not chart.

=== Extended plays ===
Title	EP details	Peak chart positions	Sales
Title	EP details	KOR	Sales
...하루가 길다	Released: November 16, 2011; Label: Sony Music Korea; Formats: CD, digital download; Track listing: 1. "하루가 길다"; 2. "그말만은 하지마"; 3. "그래주겠니?"; 4. "가슴에 살아"; 5. "지워도...널"; 6. "하루가 길다" (inst.)	8	KOR: 3,288+
그려본다	Released: September 26, 2016; Label: Genie Music; Format: CD, digital download; Track listing: 1. "그려본다"; 2. "휘파람 (너에게 가는 길)"; 3. "그려본다" (inst.)	—	
"—" denotes album did not chart.

=== Contributed singles and songs ===
==== As featured artist ====
Title	Year	Album
"바래요" (Son Ho-young feat. Tim)	2008	Returns
"겨울인데" (Pento feat. Tim)	2014	Non-album single

=== Music videos ===
Song	Year	Album	Notes	Ref.
"We Can Make It" (Jang Keun-suk, Son Ho-young and Tim as "WEE Band")	2008	Non-album single	Ministry of Education WEE Project	

== Filmography ==
- 2012: Saranghae, I Love You
- 2017: Just for You

== Awards and nominations ==
Year	Award-Giving Body	Category	Work	Result
2003	Mnet Asian Music Awards	Best New Male Artist	"I Love You" (사랑합니다)	Nominated
