= Kiss (South Korean group) =

South Korean female pop trio

KISS
- Origin: South Korea
- Years active: 2001–2002; 2016
- Label: J-Entercom
- Members: Mini; Jini; Umji

KISS (acronym of Korea International Super Star) was a South Korean female K-pop trio under J-Entercom.

== History ==
KISS debuted in 2001 with the hit single, "Because I'm a Girl" (Korean: 여자 이니까; RR: Yeoja Inikka). The music video stars actress Goo Hye-Jin and actor Shin Hyun-joon, which increased initial public interest in the song. "Because I'm a Girl" remained a karaoke staple in South Korea for many years. It has been covered by numerous singers, including South Korean female duo 2NB and solo singer Ben.

Due to the popularity of their debut single, this helped to launch the career of KISS, with an album quickly following it. However, the group quickly disbanded afterwards due to an unresolved internal conflict. After the group's, Umji became an actress and got married, Jini returned to the States and continued her singing career.

In June 2016, KISS reunited to perform their main hit "Because I'm a Girl" in Episode 36 of the variety show Two Yoo Project Sugar Man. There, it was revealed the reason for the group's disbandment was one of the members was dating.

== Discography ==
Title	Album details
Kiss First Album	Released: November 22, 2001; Label: J-Entercom, WJSJ; Format: CD, digital download; Track listing: 1. "Intro (Noise Sample)"; 2. "True Love"; 3. 전화 받어 (lit. 'Pick Up the Phone'); 4. "여자이니까 (lit. 'Because I'm a Girl')"; 5. "잘해봐" (lit. 'Good Luck'); 6. "누가 봐" (lit. 'Look Who'); 7. "Middletro"; 8. "Without You"; 9. "될 대로 되라" (lit. 'Be As You Go'); 10. "문제야" (lit. 'It's a Problem'); 11. "착하게 살자" (lit. 'Let's be Nice'); 12. "Outro"; 13. "여자이니까" (Inst.); 14. "전화 받어" (Inst.); 15. "여자이니까" (Jini Narration)
