= Pearl (singer) =

South Korean singer (born 1980)

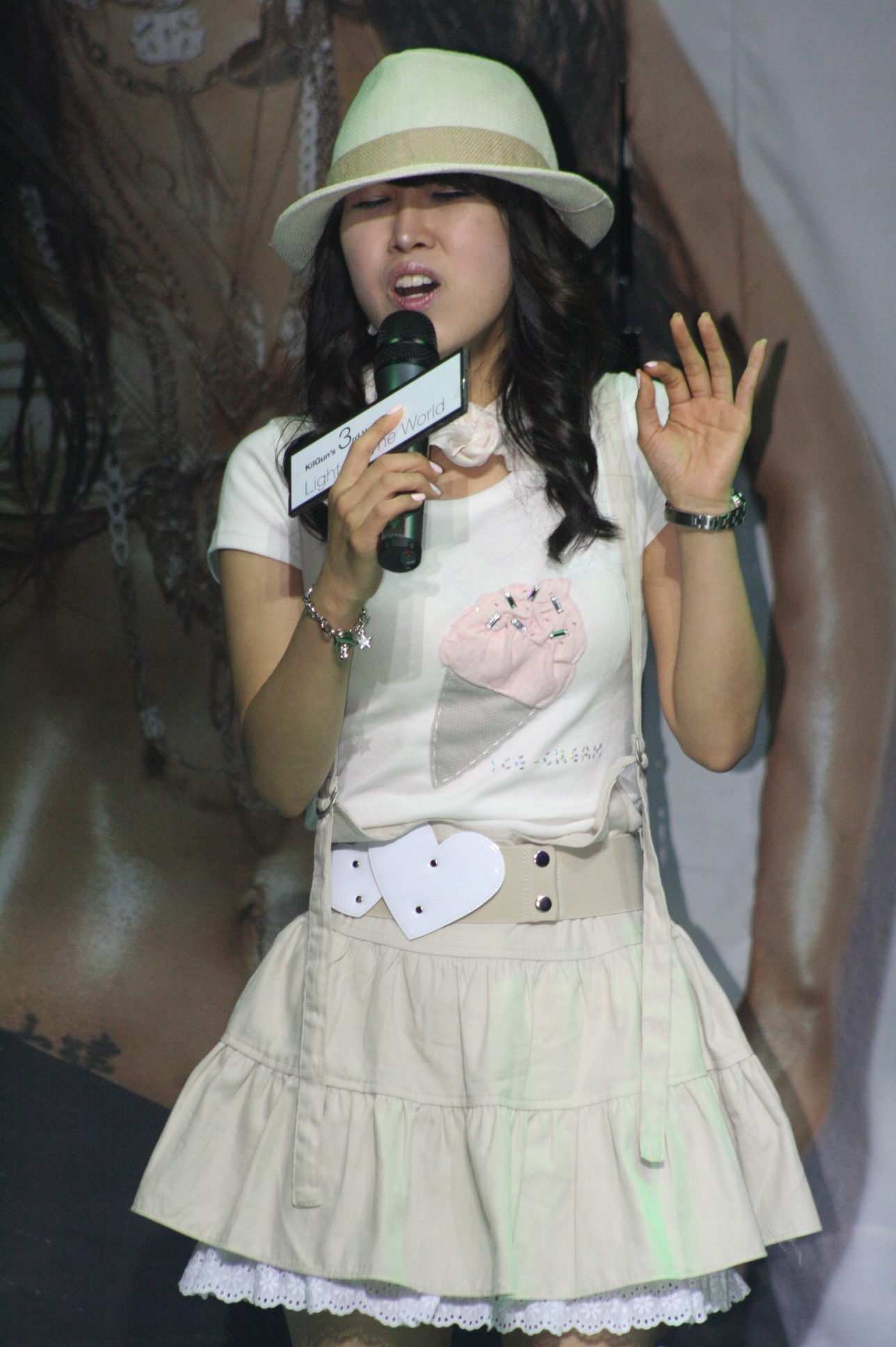
- Born: Joo Jin; 4 July 1980 (age 45); Seoul, South Korea
- Other name: Jinju
- Occupations: Singer; professor
- Musical career
- Genres: Pop; R&B/Urban; hip hop
- Instrument: Vocals
- Years active: 1997–present
- Labels: JYP Entertainment (1997–2000); Follow Entertainment

Korean name
- Hangul: 주진
- RR: Ju Jin
- MR: Chu Chin

Jinju (Korean: 진주; born 4 July 1980), better known as Pearl, is a South Korean singer.

== Career ==
On 17 December 1997, Pearl debuted under JYP Entertainment with the album Sunflower.

In 2015, Pearl competed in King of Mask Singer and became the 3rd generation mask king.

To mark her 20th anniversary of her debut, Pearl released her fourth extended play, Sunflower, on December 13, 2017.

Since March 2018, Pearl has been working as a full-time Professor at Jeonghwa Arts University.

In 2020, Pearl participated as a contestant in Two Yoo Project – Sugar Man.

== Discography ==
=== Studio albums ===
Title	Album details	Peak chart positions	Sales
Title	Album details	KOR	Sales
Sunflower (해바라기)	Released: December 17, 1997; Label: JYP Entertainment; Format: CD, cassette	—N/a	
Jinju's Soul Music	Released: December 17, 1999; Label: JYP Entertainment, Daeyoung AV; Format: CD, cassette	31	KOR: 45,879
Love Is...	Released: March 6, 2001; Label: Starmaker; Format: CD, cassette	28	KOR: 21,096
Chance	Released: December 27, 2001; Label: Kiss Entertainment; Format: CD, cassette	31	KOR: 14,884

=== Extended plays ===
Title	Album details
Jinjoo & Wedding	Released: November 22, 2004; Label: Follow Entertainment; Format: CD, cassette
White	Released: January 10, 2008; Label: Follow Entertainment; Format: CD
Pearlfect	Released: January 13, 2009; Label: Follow Entertainment; Format: CD, digital download
Sunflower	Released: December 13, 2017; Label: Follow Entertainment; Format: CD, digital download

=== Singles ===
Title	Year	Album
"I Will Survive" (난 괜찮아)	1997	Sunflower (1997)
"Everybody"	1997	Sunflower (1997)
"Are You Going" (가니)	1999	Jinju's Soul Music
"Gaji mallago" (가지 말라고)	1999	Jinju's Soul Music
"Love Is..."	2001	Love Is...
"Naega sumswineun iyu" (내가 숨쉬는 이유)	2001	Chance
"Gasiri" (가시리)	2006	Non-album single
"Dasi cheoeumeuro" (다시 처음으로)		White
"Snow X-Mas"	2008	Non-album single
"Maze" (미로) (feat. Uhm Ji-won and TBNY)	2009	Pearlfect
"Neoui yeojaga aniya" (너의 여자가 아니야)	2010	Non-album singles
"Shout" (소리쳐)	2013	Non-album singles
"It Hurts and Hurts" (아프고 아파서)	2014	Hold My Hand OST
"Home" (집으로)	2015	Non-album singles
"What A Friend We Have in Jesus"	2015	Non-album singles
"The Road Not Taken" (가지 않은 길)	2017	Sunflower (2017)
"Run to You" (너에게 달려가)	2019	Blessing of the Sea OST

== Filmography ==
=== Television ===
Year	Title	Notes	Ref.
2012	Immortal Songs: Singing the Legend	contestant	
2015	King of Mask Singer	contestant	
2020	Two Yoo Project – Sugar Man	contestant	
