= Just for You (2017 film) =

- Theatrical poster
- Hangul: 너에게만 들려주고 싶어
- RR: Neoegeman deullyeojugo sipeo
- MR: Nŏegeman tŭllyŏjugo sip'ŏ
- Directed by: Park Byoung-hwan
- Screenplay by: Park Byoung-hwan
- Produced by: Choi Hyun-min
- Starring: Tim; Son Ha-jung; Choi Jong-nam; Cha Soo-bin
- Cinematography: Park Byoung-hwan
- Distributed by: Activers Entertainment
- Release date: May 25, 2017 (South Korea)
- Running time: 67 minutes
- Country: South Korea
- Language: Korean

Just for You is a 2017 South Korean drama film directed by Park Byoung-hwan.

== Plot ==
Story of a young man who travels to Vietnam and heals his wounds of love with music.

== Cast ==
- Tim as Seong-min
- Son Ha-jung as Hye-joon
- Choi Jong-nam as Chairman Choi
- Cha Soo-bin as Jeong-bae
- Park Seon-woong
- Han Hyeon-ah
- Kim Na-on
- Jeong I-sak
- Chan Choo-rin
- Park Yoon-geun
