= Electron Sheep =

South Korean Folktronica band

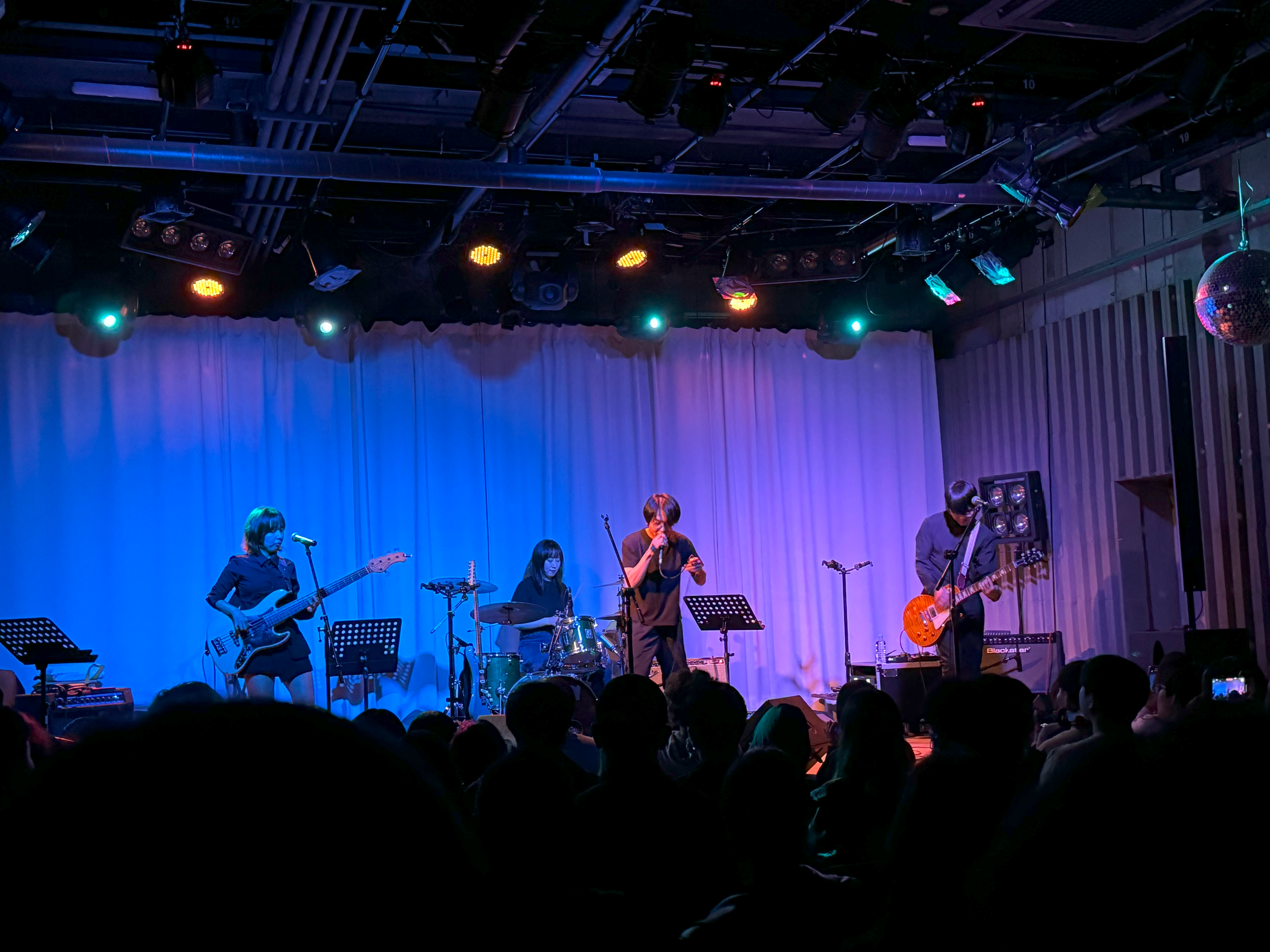
- Electron Sheep in 2023.

Background information
- Origin: Seoul, South Korea
- Genres: Indie rock, noise pop, neo-psychedelia, folk, folk rock, pop rock, folktronica, psychedelic folk, psychedelic rock, indie folk, slowcore, twee pop, chamber pop, funk rock
- Years active: 2001–present
- Label: Biscuit
- Members: Lee Jong-beom; Yoo Jeong-mok; Ryuji; Jeon Sol-ki

- Electron Sheep
- Hangul: 전자양
- RR: Jeonja yang
- MR: Chŏnja yang

Electron Sheep (Korean: 전자양) is a South Korean Folktronica band consisting of members Lee Jong-beom, Yoo Jeong-mok, Ryuji and Jeon Sol-ki.

== Career ==
Electron Sheep emerged in 2001 as a Lee Jong-beom's solo project. Their name was inspired by Philip K. Dick's science fiction Do Androids Dream of Electric Sheep?. Electron Sheep released his first studio album, Day Is Far Too Long, on August 25, 2001. On 2007, Electron Sheep released second studio album Woods(숲).

On 2015, Electron Sheep reestablished by group, consisted of Yoo Jeong-mok, Ryuji and Jeon Sol-ki. The band released their new extended play King Of Noise (소음의 왕) on September 30, 2015 On 2017, Electron Sheep released third studio album Dungeon (던전).

== Discography ==
Studio albums

- Day Is Far Too Long (2001)
- Woods (숲) (2007)
- Dungeon (던전) (2017)

Extended play

- King of Noise (소음의 왕) (2015)
