= K-pop (band) =

2001–2004 South Korean boy band

- Origin: Seoul
- Genres: K-pop
- Years active: 2001–2004; 2018
- Past members: Joomin; Donghwa; Youngwon; Yoobin; Woohyun

K-pop (Hangul: 케이팝) was a South Korean boy band that debuted in 2001. They disbanded in 2004 after their third album, Memories. On January 28, 2018, the group had a reunion performance on the show Two Yoo Project - Sugar Man. They appeared in episode 3 of the 2nd season and performed their song "그림자".

== Members ==
- Joomin (주민) – leader, rapper
- Donghwa (동화) – rapper
- Youngwon (영원) – vocalist
- Yoobin (유빈) – rapper
- Woohyun (우현) – singer

== Discography ==
=== Studio albums ===
Title	Album details	Peak chart positions	Sales
Title	Album details	KOR	Sales
K'Pop	Released: October 10, 2001; Label: Mirae Entertainment; Format: CD, cassette; Track list: 1. 그림자; 2. Game; 3. 0.5; 4. The Pain; 5. 시나브로; 6. Comedy; 7. Smile Again; 8. 연인; 9. Only You; 10. 도플갱어; 11. 소름; 12. 케세라세라; 13. Love Hacker	41	KOR: 8,809+
CU @ K-POP	Released: October 7, 2002; Label: Mirae Entertainment; Format: CD, cassette; Track list: 1. Y 2. 젊음; 3. 신기루; 4. Joy; 5. 매력; 6. The Color Of Love; 7. 정열; 8. 로망스; 9. 4U; 10. 낙원; 11. 뛰어; 12. 추상; 13. 정열	17	KOR: 31,970+
Memories	Released: September 22, 2004; Label: RCA; Format: CD, cassette; Track list: 1. Flying (intro); 2. 영화처럼; 3. 추억의 향기; 4. Lover Boys; 5. So Long; 6. 단 한번만; 7. 그 날 8. July; 9. Do U Know; 10. 수요일에는 빨간 장미를; 11. Misty; 12. 집착; 13. Life; 14. Dear My Love; 15. Epilogue (outro)	25	KOR: 6,895+
