= 5tion =

South Korean boy band

- Origin: South Korea
- Genres: K-pop
- Years active: 2001–present
- Labels: JT Corea Entertainment; Akatsuki Label; IV Entertainment; Yewon Entertainment; K Story Entertainment; Chani Entertainment; De Passion; Synnara Music
- Members: Il Kwon; Chang Woo; Ju Ho; Jun Young; Jun Ho
- Past members: Taekyung; Chanmin; Seokho; Minsung; John; Hyun; Boseok; Wooil; Kyne; Len; Noa; Marine
- Website: www.5tion-jp.com

5tion (Korean: 오션; RR: Osyeon) is a South Korean boy band popular during the early 2000s. The group's name is pronounced ocean as a play on words with the Korean word for '5' being 'oh'.

== History ==
In 2004, two members Lee Hyun & Hwang Sung-hwan (John) spun off into a project group called 'After Rain'.

In mid-2010, Hwang Sung-hwan (John) departed and formed 2NISE with Hohyeon & Jogeun.

Later in September 2010, 5tion made a comeback as a three-member group consisting of Hwang Sung-hwan (John), Lee Hyun & Woo Il.

In March 2012, the group made another comeback with a new member roster and stage names, reuniting three original members (Oh Byung-jin, Lee Hyun & Son Il-kwon) with two new members (LEN & Boseok). Wanting to reach out to the international fanbase, member names were changed to be more foreign sounding. Oh Byung-jin would be known as 'Cain', Son Il-kwon would be 'Roy' and Lee Hyun was shortened to 'Hyun'. Originally a ballad group, the return saw a change to dance music.

On January 15, 2017, the group was involved in a car crash while performing in Japan. This occurred when the van slid on an icy road and into a delivery truck; they were immediately rushed to the hospital, and none of the group members were later reported to have had any serious injuries.

After two years of inactivity, on April 29 2022, they announced a comeback through a live concert called "COME BACK" in Tokyo being on May 6 2022 followed by Live in OSAKA on May 14 and 15, 2022.

== Members ==
=== Current ===
- Il Kwon (2001–2006, 2012–present)
- Chang Woo (2020–present)
- Ju Ho (2020–present)
- Jun Young (2020–present)
- Jun Ho (2020–present)

=== Former ===
- Taekyung (태경) (2001–2006)
- Chanmin (찬민) (2006)
- Seokho (석호) (2006)
- Minsung (민성) (2006)
- John (존) (2001–2003, 2010–2011)
- Hyun (현) (2001–2003, 2010–2012)
- Boseok (보석) (2012)
- Wooil (우일) (2006, 2010–2011)
- Kyne (카인) (2001–2002, 2012–2014)
- Len (렌) (2012–2020)
- Noa (노아) (2013–2020)
- Marine (마린) (2013–2020)

== Discography ==
=== Studio albums ===
Title	Album details
Incredible / True Image of New	Released: December 27, 2001; Label: Synnara Music, Ogam Entertainment; Formats: CD, digital download; Track listing: 1. Feel (必); 2. More Than Words; 3. Now We (이제 우리); 4. Always; 5. Bye Bye; 6. She's Gone; 7. My Girl; 8. With You; 9. Say It (말해); 10. Happy; 11. Maze (미로); 12. Goodnight; 13. Wall (벽); 14. Without You
Album of the (Y)Ear	Released: October 8, 2002; Label: Synnara Music, Ogam Entertainment; Formats: CD, digital download; Track listing: 1. 24/7; 2. I Wish U 3. Come 2 Me My Love; 4. I Miss U 5. Winter Gift (겨울 선물); 6. Eternity; 7. Everythin'; 8. Thanks (감사); 9. Atta Boy!; 10. U & I Dream; 11. You End Me; 12. Azalea (진달래)
Deal In Coal	Released: February 1, 2006; Label: De Passion, Esel International; Formats: CD, digital download; Track listing: 1. The Fool; 2. If You Come To Love Again (사랑이 다시 온다면); 3. Man (남자); 4. If Only You Can (할수만 있다면); 5. Things Not To Do (가지 말라고); 6. Pain; 7. Holiday; 8. Fool (바보); 9. More Than Me (나보다); 10. After Night (야후 / 夜後)

=== Extended plays ===
Title	Album details
Rebirth	Released: March 22, 2012; Label: Chani Entertainment, Danal Entertainment; Formats: CD, digital download; Track listing: 1. Four Season Garden (사계절 정원) Narr. Kyne; 2. Let's Get Married (우리 결혼까지 하자); 3. Papillon (빠삐용); 4. Deep Slow

=== Singles ===
Title	Year	Peak chart positions		Sales	Album
Title	Year	KOR	JPN	Sales	Album
"Feel" (必)	2001	—	—	—	Incredible / True Image of New
"24/7"	2002	—	—	—	Album of the (Y)Ear
"I Wish U"	2002	—	—	—	Album of the (Y)Ear
"Man" (남자)	2006	—	—	—	Deal in Coal
"Let’s Fall In Love Again" (우리 다시 사랑하자)	2010	71	—	—	Non-album singles
"Look at My Person" (내 사람인가 봐)	2011	—	—	—	Non-album singles
"Let's Get Married" (우리 결혼까지 하자)	2012	48	—	KOR: 117,716+	Rebirth
"Papillon" (빠삐용)	2012	—	—	KOR: 57,902+	Rebirth
"Only 4 U"	2012	—	—	—	Non-album singles
"Message Arrived" (메시지가 도착했습니다)	2013	—	—	—	Non-album singles
"Love Love Love"	2013	—	—	—	Non-album singles
"More Than Words"	2014	—	—	—	Non-album singles
"Still Beautiful"	2014	—	—	—	Non-album singles
"Pain In My Heart" (심장에 쥐가나서)	2014	—	—	—	Non-album singles
"Because of You"	2015	—	—	—	Non-album singles
"Lie"	2015	—	—	—	Non-album singles
"My Valentine"	2016	—	—	—	Non-album singles
"Come Back" (돌아와줘요)	2018	—	—	—	Non-album singles
"Love Takes Time"	2018	—	—	—	Non-album singles
"Wanna Know You"	2019	—	21	JPN: 3,341	Non-album singles
"Final Destination" (넌 나를 죽이고 떠나)	2020	—	—	—	Rebirth (single)
"—" denotes releases that did not chart.

=== Soundtrack appearances ===
Year	Title	Album
2011	"Love Made In Heaven" (하늘이 준 사랑)	Manny OST
