= List of King of Mask Singer episodes (2020) =

South Korean variety-music show

- No. of episodes: Regular: 52

Release
- Original network: MBC
- Original release: January 5 – December 27, 2020

Season chronology
- ← Previous; 2019 Next → 2021

This is a list of episodes of the South Korean variety-music show King of Mask Singer in 2020. The show airs on MBC as part of their Sunday Night lineup. The names listed below are in performance order.

– Contestant is instantly eliminated by the live audience and judging panel
– After being eliminated, contestant performs a prepared song for the next round and takes off their mask during the instrumental break
– After being eliminated and revealing their identity, contestant has another special performance.
– Contestant advances to the next round.
– Contestant becomes the challenger.
– Mask King.

== Episodes ==
=== 118th Generation Mask King (cont.) ===
- Contestants: Greg Priester, DDotty, Kang Seung-sik (Victon), Choi Jeong-hwan (M To M), Naeun (April), Oh Jeong-yeon, Harisu, Park Bom
Episode 236

Episode 236 was broadcast on January 5, 2020.

Order	Stage Name	Real Name	Song	Original artist	Vote
Round 2
Pair 1	Hold Your Course	Greg Priester	A Shot of Soju (소주 한 잔)	Im Chang-jung	42
Pair 1	Bruce Lee	Choi Jeong-hwan of M To M	Severely (지독하게)	F.T. Island	57
Pair 2	Lemon	Naeun of April	Tears (눈물)	Riaa	42
Pair 2	2020 is Coming	Park Bom	As Time Goes By (시간이 흐른 뒤)	Yoon Mi-rae	57
Round 3
Finalists	Bruce Lee	Choi Jeong-hwan of M To M	Don't Go Today (오늘은 가지마)	Im Se-joon	56
Finalists	2020 is Coming	Park Bom	Another Start (또 다른 시작)	Seo Ji-won	43
Final
Battle	Bruce Lee	Choi Jeong-hwan of M To M	Previous three songs used as voting standard		12
Battle	Sweet 18	So Chan-whee	Dope (쩔어)	BTS	87

=== 119th Generation Mask King ===
- Contestants: Chanmi (AOA), Ahn Hye-kyung, Pyo In-bong, Kim Young-min (1980 singer) (Taesaja), Jihoo (IZ), Kang Hyung-ho (Forestella), Jung Yi-han (singer) (The Nuts), Ahn Mi-na
Episodes 237 – 238

Episode 237

Episode 237 was broadcast on January 12, 2020. This marks the beginning of the Hundred-nineteenth Generation.

Order	Stage Name	Real Name	Song	Original artist	Vote
Round 1
Pair 1	Hotteok	Chanmi of AOA	Tell Me You Love Me (좋다고 말해)	Bolbbalgan4	61
Pair 1	Roasted Sweet Potato	Ahn Hye-kyung	Tell Me You Love Me (좋다고 말해)	Bolbbalgan4	38
2nd Song	Roasted Sweet Potato	Ahn Hye-kyung	Come on Baby Tonight (늘 지금처럼)	Lee Ye-rin	—
Pair 2	Central Park	Pyo In-bong	Standing in the Shades of Tree (가로수 그늘 아래 서면)	Lee Moon-sae	31
Pair 2	Tapgol Park	Kim Young-min of Taesaja	Standing in the Shades of Tree (가로수 그늘 아래 서면)	Lee Moon-sae	68
2nd Song	Central Park	Pyo In-bong	It's too Late (너무 늦었잖아요)	Byun Jin-sub	—
Pair 3	Ginseng Digger	Jihoo of IZ	Let It Go (Frozen OST)	Idina Menzel	59
Pair 3	Ginseng	Kang Hyung-ho of Forestella	Let It Go (Frozen OST)	Idina Menzel	40
2nd Song	Ginseng	Kang Hyung-ho of Forestella	Sad Beatrice (슬픈 베아트리체)	Cho Yong-pil	—
Pair 4	Mouse	Jung Yi-han of The Nuts	Place Where You Need to Be (니가 있어야 할 곳)	g.o.d	72
Pair 4	Rat	Ahn Mi-na	Place Where You Need to Be (니가 있어야 할 곳)	g.o.d	27
2nd Song	Rat	Ahn Mi-na	One Love	1TYM	—

Episode 238

Episode 238 was broadcast on January 19, 2020.

Order	Stage Name	Real Name	Song	Original artist	Vote
Round 2
Pair 1	Hotteok	Chanmi of AOA	Holiday	Suzy ft. DPR Live	28
Pair 1	Tapgol Park	Kim Young-min of Taesaja	For Our Precious Love (아껴둔 사랑을 위해)	Lee Joo-won	71
Pair 2	Ginseng Digger	Jihoo of IZ	You Touched My Heart (넌 감동이었어)	Sung Si-kyung	52
Pair 2	Mouse	Jung Yi-han of The Nuts	Clockwork (시계 태엽)	Lim Jeong-hee	47
Round 3
Finalists	Tapgol Park	Kim Young-min of Taesaja	Rain	Lee Juck	45
Finalists	Ginseng Digger	Jihoo of IZ	Love is Like a Snowflake (사랑은 눈꽃처럼)	Xia Junsu	54
Special	Tapgol Park	Kim Young-min of Taesaja	The Way (도) & Time	Taesaja	—
Final
Battle	Ginseng Digger	Jihoo of IZ	Previous three songs used as voting standard		22
Battle	Sweet 18	So Chan-whee	Here, I Stand for You	N.EX.T	77

=== 120th Generation Mask King ===
- Contestants: Son Ho-young (g.o.d), Euijin (Sonamoo), Jang Gwang, Kim Young-chul, Lee Jae-yoon (singer) (SF9), Punchnello, Jung Mi-ae, Kang Hyun-jeong (Bubble Sisters)
Episodes 239 – 240

Episode 239

Episode 239 was broadcast on January 26, 2020. This marks the beginning of the Hundred-twentieth Generation.

Order	Stage Name	Real Name	Song	Original artist	Vote
Round 1
Pair 1	Rice Cake Soup	Son Ho-young of g.o.d	I Believe	Shin Seung-hun	53
Pair 1	Hong-Dong White Paper	Euijin of Sonamoo	I Believe	Shin Seung-hun	46
2nd Song	Hong-Dong White Paper	Euijin of Sonamoo	Just Like Yesterday (어제처럼)	J.ae	—
Pair 2	Choi Bool-am	Jang Gwang	The Private's Letter (이등병의 편지)	Kim Kwang-seok, Kim Hyun-sung	57
Pair 2	Welsh Onion	Kim Young-chul	The Private's Letter (이등병의 편지)	Kim Kwang-seok, Kim Hyun-sung	42
2nd Song	Welsh Onion	Kim Young-chul	When My Loneliness Calls You (나의 외로움이 널 부를 때)	Jang Pil-soon	—
Pair 3	Hapjeong Station Exit 5	Jaeyoon of SF9	Bravo, My Life!	Bom Yeoreum Gaeul Kyeoul	70
Pair 3	Sinchon Station Exit 1	Punchnello	Bravo, My Life!	Bom Yeoreum Gaeul Kyeoul	29
2nd Song	Sinchon Station Exit 1	Punchnello	She Is	Clazziquai	—
Pair 4	American Hotdog	Jung Mi-ae	Music Is My Life	Lim Jeong-hee	60
Pair 4	Korean Hotdog	Kang Hyun-jeong of Bubble Sisters	Music Is My Life	Lim Jeong-hee	39
2nd Song	Korean Hotdog	Kang Hyun-jeong of Bubble Sisters	No.1	BoA	—

Episode 240

Episode 240 was broadcast on February 2, 2020.

Order	Stage Name	Real Name	Song	Original artist	Vote
Round 2
Pair 1	Rice Cake Soup	Son Ho-young of g.o.d	All of My Life	Park Won	66
Pair 1	Choi Bool-am	Jang Gwang	Cafe of the Winter (그 겨울의 찻집)	Cho Yong-pil	33
Pair 2	Hapjeong Station Exit 5	Jaeyoon of SF9	The Fool (이 바보야)	Jung Seung-hwan	26
Pair 2	American Hotdog	Jung Mi-ae	Moon's Fall (달의 몰락)	Kim Hyun-chul	73
Round 3
Finalists	Rice Cake Soup	Son Ho-young of g.o.d	The Snowman (눈사람)	Jung Seung-hwan	28
Finalists	American Hotdog	Jung Mi-ae	Again (그때 또 다시)	Im Chang-jung	71
Special	Rice Cake Soup	Son Ho-young of g.o.d	To Mother (어머님께) + Friday Night + One Candle (촛불하나)	g.o.d	—
Final
Battle	American Hotdog	Jung Mi-ae	Previous three songs used as voting standard		45
Battle	Sweet 18	So Chan-whee	You Are My Everything	Gummy	54

=== 121st Generation Mask King ===
- Contestants: Oh Seung-hee (CLC), Kim Hyung-mook, Dayoung (Cosmic Girls), Kim Se-jin, Jo Jin-soo (Zam), Geum Bi (Turtles), Heechul (Super Junior), Song Hae-na
Episodes 241 – 242

Episode 241

Episode 241 was broadcast on February 9, 2020. This marks the beginning of the Hundred-twenty-first Generation.

Order	Stage Name	Real Name	Song	Original artist	Vote
Round 1
Pair 1	Mojito	Seunghee of CLC	Drunken Truth (취중진담)	Exhibition	62
Pair 1	Maldives	Kim Hyung-mook	Drunken Truth (취중진담)	Exhibition	37
2nd Song	Maldives	Kim Hyung-mook	Thanks (감사)	Kim Dong-ryul	—
Pair 2	Brachiosaurus	Dayoung of Cosmic Girls	My Only Friend (나만의 친구)	Solid	64
Pair 2	Tyrannosaurus	Kim Se-jin	My Only Friend (나만의 친구)	Solid	35
2nd Song	Tyrannosaurus	Kim Se-jin	Redevelopment of Love (사랑의 재개발)	Yoo San-seul	—
Pair 3	Dynamic Signature	Jo Jin-soo of Zam	Even Though My Heart Aches (가슴 아파도)	Fly to the Sky	56
Pair 3	Toothpaste	Geum Bi of Turtles	Even Though My Heart Aches (가슴 아파도)	Fly to the Sky	43
2nd Song	Toothpaste	Geum Bi of Turtles	Warning of the Eve (이브의 경고)	Park Mi-kyung	—
Pair 4	Generation X	Heechul of Super Junior	Affection (정)	Young Turks Club	69
Pair 4	X-File	Song Hae-na	Affection (정)	Young Turks Club	30
2nd Song	X-File	Song Hae-na	Scent of Time (시간 속의 향기)	Kang Susie	—

Episode 242

Episode 242 was broadcast on February 16, 2020.

Order	Stage Name	Real Name	Song	Original artist	Vote
Round 2
Pair 1	Mojito	Seunghee of CLC	Beautiful Woman (미인)	Lee Ki-chan	25
Pair 1	Brachiosaurus	Dayoung of Cosmic Girls	Come Back Home	2NE1	74
Pair 2	Dynamic Signature	Jo Jin-soo of Zam	I'm Yours (애모)	Kim Soo-hee	33
Pair 2	Generation X	Heechul of Super Junior	Last Concert (마지막 콘서트)	Lee Seung-chul	66
Round 3
Finalists	Brachiosaurus	Dayoung of Cosmic Girls	Perhaps That Was Love (아마도 그건)	Choi Yong-joon	55
Finalists	Generation X	Heechul of Super Junior	I Know (난 알아요)	Seo Taiji and Boys	44
Final
Battle	Brachiosaurus	Dayoung of Cosmic Girls	Previous three songs used as voting standard		27
Battle	Sweet 18	So Chan-whee	Décalcomanie	Mamamoo	72

=== 122nd Generation Mask King ===
- Contestants: Ahn Seon-young, Miyeon ((G)I-dle), Im Kang-sung, Seung-gook Lee, Kim Jung-mo, Soyul, Boi B (Rhythm Power), Seungyoon (Winner)
Episodes 243 – 244

Episode 243

Episode 243 was broadcast on February 23, 2020. This marks the beginning of the Hundred-twenty-second Generation.

Order	Stage Name	Real Name	Song	Original artist	Vote
Round 1
Pair 1	Cider	Ahn Seon-young	3! 4!	Roo'ra	35
Pair 1	A Boiled Egg	Miyeon of (G)I-dle	3! 4!	Roo'ra	64
2nd Song	Cider	Ahn Seon-young	Deviation (일탈)	Jaurim	—
Pair 2	The Giraffe Drawing That I Drew	Im Kang-sung	Despite Holding On (붙잡고도)	Noel	55
Pair 2	Soy Sauce Factory Foreman	Seung-gook Lee	Despite Holding On (붙잡고도)	Noel	44
2nd Song	Soy Sauce Factory Foreman	Seung-gook Lee	Don't Go, Don't Go (가지마 가지마)	Brown Eyes	—
Pair 3	Windmill	Kim Jung-mo	Love in the Milky Way Cafe (사랑은 은하수 다방에서)	10cm	46
Pair 3	Pinwheel	Soyul	Love in the Milky Way Cafe (사랑은 은하수 다방에서)	10cm	53
2nd Song	Windmill	Kim Jung-mo	Time	Taesaja	—
Pair 4	Kettle	Boi B of Rhythm Power	Short Hair (단발머리)	Cho Yong-pil	22
Pair 4	Chow Yun-fat	Seungyoon of Winner	Short Hair (단발머리)	Cho Yong-pil	77
2nd Song	Kettle	Boi B of Rhythm Power	In Dreams (꿈속에서)	Exhibition	—

Episode 244

Episode 244 was broadcast on March 1, 2020.

Order	Stage Name	Real Name	Song	Original artist	Vote
Round 2
Pair 1	A Boiled Egg	Miyeon of (G)I-dle	Good Bye Sadness, Hello Happiness	Yoon Mi-rae	37
Pair 1	The Giraffe Drawing That I Drew	Im Kang-sung	The Story That Can't Be Told (전할 수 없는 이야기)	Wheesung	62
Pair 2	Pinwheel	Soyul	Can You Hear Me (들리나요)	Taeyeon	21
Pair 2	Chow Yun-fat	Seungyoon of Winner	Who Are You	Sam Kim	78
Round 3
Finalists	The Giraffe Drawing That I Drew	Im Kang-sung	Secret (비밀)	Boohwal	23
Finalists	Chow Yun-fat	Seungyoon of Winner	Family Picture (가족사진)	Kim Jin-ho	76
Final
Battle	Chow Yun-fat	Seungyoon of Winner	Previous three songs used as voting standard		53
Battle	Sweet 18	So Chan-whee	Where Are You (그대는 어디에)	Yim Jae-beom	46

=== 123rd Generation Mask King ===
- Contestants: Jane (South Korean idol singer) (Momoland), YOYOMI, Son Ji-hyun, I'll (Hoppipolla (band)), Hong Seo-beom, Kim Il-joong, Yoon Jung-soo, Kim Jae-hee
Episodes 245 – 246

Episode 245

Episode 245 was broadcast on March 8, 2020. This marks the beginning of the Hundred-twenty-third Generation.

Order	Stage Name	Real Name	Song	Original artist	Vote
Round 1
Pair 1	Ppogeri	Jane of Momoland	Now	Fin.K.L	39
Pair 1	Cup Noodles	YOYOMI	Now	Fin.K.L	60
2nd Song	Ppogeri	Jane of Momoland	Flower Way (꽃길)	Sejeong	—
Pair 2	White Butterfly	Son Ji-hyun	I'm in Love	Ra.D	21
Pair 2	Tiger Swallowtail	I'll of Hoppipolla	I'm in Love	Ra.D	78
2nd Song	White Butterfly	Son Ji-hyun	The Pierrot Laughs at Us (삐에로는 우릴 보고 웃지)	Kim Wan-sun	—
Pair 3	Gangbyeon Expressway	Hong Seo-beom	Lost Stars (Begin Again OST)	Adam Levine	77
Pair 3	Kim Su-ro	Kim Il-joong	Lost Stars (Begin Again OST)	Adam Levine	22
2nd Song	Kim Su-ro	Kim Il-joong	Meant to be (천생연분)	Solid	—
Pair 4	Poodle	Yoon Jung-soo	Don't Give Up (포기하지마)	Sung Jin-woo	48
Pair 4	Pudding	Kim Jae-hee	Don't Give Up (포기하지마)	Sung Jin-woo	51
2nd Song	Poodle	Yoon Jung-soo	To My Old Friend (옛 친구에게)	Travel Sketch	—

Episode 246

Episode 246 was broadcast on March 15, 2020.

Order	Stage Name	Real Name	Song	Original artist	Vote
Round 2
Pair 1	Cup Noodles	YOYOMI	Sonata of Temptation (유혹의 소나타)	Ivy	35
Pair 1	Tiger Swallowtail	I'll of Hoppipolla	Live a Long Long Time (그대가 그대를)	Lee Seung-hwan	64
Special	Cup Noodle	YOYOMI	The Woman Outside the Window (창밖의 여자)	Cho Yong-pil	—
Pair 2	Gangbyeon Expressway	Hong Seo-beom	Passionate Love (열애)	Yoon Shi-nae	51
Pair 2	Pudding	Kim Jae-hee	Stigma (낙인)	Yim Jae-beom	48
Special	Pudding	Kim Jae-hee	The More I Love (사랑할수록)	Boohwal	—
Round 3
Finalists	Tiger Swallowtail	I'll of Hoppipolla	Sofa	Crush	50
Finalists	Gangbyeon Expressway	Hong Seo-beom	Stupid Smile (바보같은 미소)	Jo Gap-kyung	49
Final
Battle	Tiger Swallowtail	I'll of Hoppipolla	Previous three songs used as voting standard		15
Battle	Chow Yun-fat	Seungyoon of Winner	Recede (멀어지다)	Nell	84

=== 124th Generation Mask King ===
- Contestants: Shin Yi, Wax, Ha Hyun-gon (Click-B), No Min-hyuk (Click-B), Byung-hyun Kim, Chuu (Loona), Michael K. Lee, Jibeom (singer) (Golden Child)
Episodes 247 – 248

Episode 247

Episode 247 was broadcast on March 22, 2020. This marks the beginning of the Hundred-twenty-fourth Generation. (Note: Due to the COVID-19 pandemic, the show would be recorded without any audience in the episodes, and the matches' results would be decided by the celebrity panelists.)

Order	Stage Name	Real Name	Song	Original artist	Vote
Round 1
Pair 1	Mirror Ball	Shin Yi	Smile Again (으라차차)	Rumble Fish	4
Pair 1	Globe	Wax	Smile Again (으라차차)	Rumble Fish	17
2nd Song	Mirror Ball	Shin Yi	Flying Duck (오리 날다)	Cherry Filter	—
Pair 2	Rocky	Ha Hyun-gon of Click-B	At J's Bar (J's Bar에서)	Exhibition	17
Pair 2	Siberian Husky	No Min-hyuk of Click-B	At J's Bar (J's Bar에서)	Exhibition	4
2nd Song	Siberian Husky	No Min-hyuk of Click-B	Can I Get Married? (장가갈 수 있을까)	Coffe Boy	—
Pair 3	Cherry Blossom Ending	Byung-hyun Kim	One More Step (한 걸음 더)	Yoon Sang	7
Pair 3	Spring Girl	Chuu of Loona	One More Step (한 걸음 더)	Yoon Sang	14
2nd Song	Cherry Blossom Ending	Byung-hyun Kim	Happy Our Love (기쁜 우리 사랑은)	Choi Sung-soo	—
Pair 4	Half Moon Prince	Michael K. Lee	Black or White	Michael Jackson	11
Pair 4	Full Moon Prince	Jibeom of Golden Child	Black or White	Michael Jackson	10
2nd Song	Full Moon Prince	Jibeom of Golden Child	It's Not Love If It Hurts Too Much (너무 아픈 사랑은 사랑이 아니었음을)	Kim Kwang-seok	—

Episode 248

Episode 248 was broadcast on March 29, 2020.

Order	Stage Name	Real Name	Song	Original artist	Vote
Round 2
Pair 1	Globe	Wax	Lifetime (일생을)	Kim Hyun-chul	6
Pair 1	Rocky	Ha Hyun-gon of Click-B	Kiss Me	J. Y. Park	15
Special	Globe	Wax	Oppa	Wax	—
Pair 2	Spring Girl	Chuu of Loona	If I Had Only You (그대만 있다면)	Weather Forecast	10
Pair 2	Half Moon Prince	Michael K. Lee	Fall in Love (사랑을 외치다)	MC the Max	11
Round 3
Finalists	Rocky	Ha Hyun-gon of Click-B	Instinctively (본능적으로)	Yoon Jong-shin	4
Finalists	Half Moon Prince	Michael K. Lee	Resignation (체념)	Big Mama	17
Final
Battle	Half Moon Prince	Michael K. Lee	Previous three songs used as voting standard		10
Battle	Chow Yun-fat	Seungyoon of Winner	Lie Lie Lie (거짓말 거짓말 거짓말)	Lee Juck	11
Special	Half Moon Prince	Michael K. Lee	This Is the Moment	Musical Jekyll & Hyde OST	—

=== 125th Generation Mask King ===
- Contestants: Kim Hye-ri, Choi Yong-joon, Kim Woo-seok (UP10TION), Lee Sang-joon, Park Tam-hee, Baek Chan (8Eight), Rangshow (Bubble Sisters), Hyerim (Wonder Girls)
Episodes 249 – 250

Episode 249

Episode 249 was broadcast on April 5, 2020. This marks the beginning of the Hundred-twenty-fifth Generation.

Order	Stage Name	Real Name	Song	Original artist	Vote
Opening	Kwon In-ha & Luna		Scar Deeper Than Love (사랑보다 깊은 상처)	Yim Jae-beom	—
Round 1
Pair 1	Magician	Kim Hye-ri	It's Only Love (사랑일뿐야)	Kim Min-woo	14
Pair 1	Pierrot	Choi Yong-joon	It's Only Love (사랑일뿐야)	Kim Min-woo	7
2nd Song	Pierrot	Choi Yong-joon	Letter (편지)	Kim Kwang-jin	—
Special	Pierrot	Choi Yong-joon	Perhaps That Was Love (아마도 그건)	Choi Yong-joon	—
Pair 2	Hot Friday	Kim Woo-seok of UP10TION	Love, That Common Word (사랑한다는 흔한 말)	Kim Yeon-woo	18
Pair 2	Happy Birthday	Lee Sang-joon	Love, That Common Word (사랑한다는 흔한 말)	Kim Yeon-woo	3
2nd Song	Happy Birthday	Lee Sang-joon	Paradise (낙원); Entertainer (연예인)	Psy	—
Pair 3	Sushi	Park Tam-hee	Good (좋다)	Daybreak	5
Pair 3	Samgak Gimbap	Baek Chan of 8Eight	Good (좋다)	Daybreak	16
2nd Song	Sushi	Park Tam-hee	Magic Carpet Ride (매직 카펫 라이드)	Jaurim	—
Pair 4	Hamster	Rangshow of Bubble Sisters	Listen to Me (내 얘길 들어봐)	Papaya	20
Pair 4	Lobster	Hyerim of Wonder Girls	Listen to Me (내 얘길 들어봐)	Papaya	1
2nd Song	Lobster	Hyerim of Wonder Girls	Sweet Dream	Jang Na-ra	—

Episode 250

Episode 250 was broadcast on April 12, 2020.

Order	Stage Name	Real Name	Song	Original artist	Vote
Round 2
Pair 1	Magician	Kim Hye-ri	Long Day (긴 하루)	Lee Seung-chul	4
Pair 1	Hot Friday	Kim Woo-seok of UP10TION	I Will Give You It All (다 줄거야)	Jo Gyu-man	17
Pair 2	Samgak Gimbap	Baek Chan of 8Eight	Think About' Chu	Asoto Union	6
Pair 2	Hamster	Rangshow of Bubble Sisters	Ma Boy	Sistar19	15
Round 3
Finalists	Hot Friday	Kim Woo-seok of UP10TION	To You (너에게)	Seo Taiji and Boys	2
Finalists	Hamster	Rangshow of Bubble Sisters	Like It (좋니)	Yoon Jong-shin	19
Final
Battle	Hamster	Rangshow of Bubble Sisters	Previous three songs used as voting standard		5
Battle	Chow Yun-fat	Seungyoon of Winner	Bounce	Cho Yong-pil	16

=== 126th Generation Mask King ===
- Contestants: Ha Do-kwon, Ko Woo-rim (Forestella), Hyun Jung-hwa, Choi Yoo-jung (Weki Meki), Ji Won-yi, Hwang In-sun, Kim Sang-min, Lee Han-wi
Episodes 251 – 252

Episode 251

Episode 251 was broadcast on April 19, 2020. This marks the beginning of the Hundred-twenty-sixth Generation.

Order	Stage Name	Real Name	Song	Original artist	Vote
Round 1
Pair 1	Popular Ballads	Ha Do-kwon	Mai Più Così Lontano	Andrea Bocelli	11
Pair 1	Beast	Ko Woo-rim of Forestella	Mai Più Così Lontano	Andrea Bocelli	10
2nd Song	Beast	Ko Woo-rim of Forestella	About Romance (낭만에 대하여)	Choi Baek-ho	—
Pair 2	Libra	Hyun Jung-hwa	You, Clouds, Rain (비도 오고 그래서)	Heize	6
Pair 2	Scorpio	Choi Yoo-jung of Weki Meki	You, Clouds, Rain (비도 오고 그래서)	Heize	15
2nd Song	Libra	Hyun Jung-hwa	Rain and You (비와 당신)	Park Joong-hoon	—
Pair 3	Jjamjjamyeon	Ji Won-yi	Flower (꽃)	Jang Yun-jeong	14
Pair 3	Half-and-half Chicken	Hwang In-sun	Flower (꽃)	Jang Yun-jeong	7
2nd Song	Half-and-half Chicken	Hwang In-sun	Exultation (환희)	Jung Soo-ra	—
Pair 4	007	Kim Sang-min	Dear My Lady (숙녀에게)	Byun Jin-sub	17
Pair 4	Bang	Lee Han-wi	Dear My Lady (숙녀에게)	Byun Jin-sub	4
2nd Song	Bang	Lee Han-wi	Sad Story of Old Couple (어느 60대 노부부의 이야기)	Kim Mok-kyung	—

Episode 252

Episode 252 was broadcast on April 26, 2020.

Order	Stage Name	Real Name	Song	Original artist	Vote
Round 2
Pair 1	Popular Ballads	Ha Do-kwon	Lazenca, Save Us	N.EX.T	13
Pair 1	Scorpius	Choi Yoo-jung of Weki Meki	One Million Roses (백만송이 장미)	Sim Soo-bong	8
Pair 2	Jjamjjamyeon	Ji Won-yi	One's Way Back (귀로)	Park Seon-joo	18
Pair 2	007	Kim Sang-min	Like an Indian Doll (인디언 인형처럼)	Na-mi	3
Special	007	Kim Sang-min	You	Kim Sang-min	—
Round 3
Finalists	Popular Ballads	Ha Do-kwon	Somebody's Dream (어떤이의 꿈)	Bom Yeoreum Gaeul Kyeoul	2
Finalists	Jjamjjamyeon	Ji Won-yi	A Sexy Man (섹시한 남자)	Space A	19
Final
Battle	Jjamjjamyeon	Ji Won-yi	Previous three songs used as voting standard		7
Battle	Chow Yun-fat	Seungyoon of Winner	Blue Whale (흰수염고래)	YB	14

=== 127th Generation Mask King ===
- Contestants: Code Kunst, Na Tae-joo, Cha Chung-hwa, Yang Hye-seung, Kim Kang-hoon, Kim Ho-joong, Abhishek Gupta (Lucky), Lee Min (As One)
Episodes 253 – 254

Episode 253

Episode 253 was broadcast on May 3, 2020. This marks the beginning of the Hundred-twenty-seventh Generation.

Order	Stage Name	Real Name	Song	Original artist	Vote
Round 1
Pair 1	Music College Oppa	Code Kunst	A Whale's Dream (고래의 꿈)	Bobby Kim	5
Pair 1	Physical College Oppa	Na Tae-joo	A Whale's Dream (고래의 꿈)	Bobby Kim	16
2nd Song	Music College Oppa	Code Kunst	With a Heart that Should Forget (잊어야 한다는 마음으로)	Kim Kwang-seok	—
Pair 2	Venus	Cha Cheong-hwa	Side Road (골목길)	Shinchon Blues	6
Pair 2	Bonus	Yang Hye-seung	Side Road (골목길)	Shinchon Blues	15
2nd Song	Venus	Cha Cheong-hwa	Swing Baby	J. Y. Park	—
Pair 3	Report Card A+	Kim Kang-hoon	Unconditional (무조건)	Park Sang-cheol	5
Pair 3	Korean Beef 1++	Kim Ho-joong	Unconditional (무조건)	Park Sang-cheol	16
2nd Song	Report Card A+	Kim Kang-hoon	Your Shampoo Scent in the Flowers (흔들리는 꽃들 속에서 네 샴푸향이 느껴진거야)	Jang Beom-june	—
Pair 4	Kimchi	Abhishek Gupta (Lucky)	A Whole New World (Aladdin OST)	Peabo Bryson & Regina Belle	5
Pair 4	Cheese	Lee Min of As One	A Whole New World (Aladdin OST)	Peabo Bryson & Regina Belle	16
2nd Song	Kimchi	Abhishek Gupta (Lucky)	Winter Rain (겨울비)	Kim Jong-seo	—

Episode 254

Episode 254 was broadcast on May 10, 2020.

Order	Stage Name	Real Name	Song	Original artist	Vote
Round 2
Pair 1	Physical College Oppa	Na Tae-joo	Hands of a Clock (시계바늘)	Shin Yoo	8
Pair 1	Bonus	Yang Hye-seung	Cannot Have You (가질 수 없는 너)	Bank	13
Special	Physical College Oppa	Na Tae-joo	I'll Be Back	2PM	—
Pair 2	Korean Beef 1++	Kim Ho-joong	Running in the Sky (하늘을 달리다)	Lee Juck	11
Pair 2	Cheese	Lee Min of As One	Here I Am Again (다시 난, 여기) (Crash Landing on You OST)	Baek Ye-rin	10
Special	Cheese	Lee Min of As One	Want and Resent (원하고 원망하죠)	As One	—
Round 3
Finalists	Bonus	Yang Hye-seung	The Barley Hump (보릿고개)	Jin Sung	8
Finalists	Korean Beef 1++	Kim Ho-joong	Mt. Chilgab (칠갑산)	Joo Byung-seon	13
Special	Bonus	Yang Hye-seung	Splendid Single (화려한 싱글)	Yang Hye-seung	—
Final
Battle	Korean Beef 1++	Kim Ho-joong	Previous three songs used as voting standard		9
Battle	Chow Yun-fat	Seungyoon of Winner	Twenty-five, Twenty-one (스물다섯, 스물하나)	Jaurim	12

=== 128th Generation Mask King ===
- Contestants: Jang Mun-ik (DKZ), Yang Kyung-won, Shim Ji-ho, Jo Yu-ri (Iz*One), Shim Eun-woo, Choi Jae-rim, Ryu Ji-kwang, Kim Jung-nam (singer) (Turbo)
Episodes 255 – 256

Episode 255

Episode 255 was broadcast on May 17, 2020. This marks the beginning of the Hundred-twenty-eighth Generation.

Order	Stage Name	Real Name	Song	Original artist	Vote
Round 1
Pair 1	D'Artagnan	Munik of Dongkiz	Flaming Sunset (붉은 노을)	Lee Moon-sae	1
Pair 1	Don Quixote	Yang Kyung-won	Flaming Sunset (붉은 노을)	Lee Moon-sae	20
2nd Song	D'Artagnan	Munik of Dongkiz	H.E.R	Block B	—
Pair 2	Temptation of Wolf	Shim Ji-ho	Introduce Me a Good Person (좋은 사람 있으면 소개시켜줘)	Basis	4
Pair 2	Seduction of Wife	Jo Yu-ri of Iz*One	Introduce Me a Good Person (좋은 사람 있으면 소개시켜줘)	Basis	17
2nd Song	Temptation of Wolf	Shim Ji-ho	Blue Day	The Position	—
Pair 3	Spear	Shim Eun-woo	Desperado	Eagles	4
Pair 3	Shield	Choi Jae-rim	Desperado	Eagles	17
2nd Song	Spear	Shim Eun-woo	If You're Gonna Be Like This (이럴 거면)	Ivy	—
Pair 4	Picture Diary	Ryu Ji-kwang	Dear Jaok (자옥아)	Park Sang-cheol	11
Pair 4	Farm Diary	Kim Jung-nam of Turbo	Dear Jaok (자옥아)	Park Sang-cheol	10
2nd Song	Farm Diary	Kim Jung-nam of Turbo	Last Night Story (어젯밤 이야기)	Sobangcha	—

Episode 256

Episode 256 was broadcast on May 24, 2020.

Order	Stage Name	Real Name	Song	Original artist	Vote
Round 2
Pair 1	Don Quixote	Yang Kyung-won	I Didn't Know That Time (그땐 미처 알지 못했지)	Lee Juck	7
Pair 1	Seduction of Wife	Jo Yu-ri of Iz*One	Rainy Season (장마)	Jung-in	14
Pair 2	Shield	Choi Jae-rim	Diamond (돌덩이) (Itaewon Class OST)	Ha Hyun-woo	13
Pair 2	Picture Diary	Ryu Ji-kwang	Please	Lee Ki-chan	8
Round 3
Finalists	Seduction of Wife	Jo Yu-ri of Iz*One	Brown City	Brown Eyed Soul	2
Finalists	Shield	Choi Jae-rim	Companion (동반자)	Kim Dong-ryul	19
Final
Battle	Shield	Choi Jae-rim	Previous three songs used as voting standard		11
Battle	Chow Yun-fat	Seungyoon of Winner	Lonely Night	Boohwal	10

=== 129th Generation Mask King ===
- Contestants: Jo Hyang-gi, Jo Jung-min, Park Goo-yoon, Hynn, Kim Ga-young (weather caster), Joohoney (Monsta X), Yugyeom (Got7), Kim Beom-ryong
Episodes 257 – 258

Episode 257

Episode 257 was broadcast on May 31, 2020. This marks the beginning of the Hundred-twenty-ninth Generation.

Order	Stage Name	Real Name	Song	Original artist	Vote
Round 1
Pair 1	Fin.K.L	Jo Hyang-gi	Killer	Baby Vox	3
Pair 1	S.E.S.	Jo Jeong-min	Killer	Baby Vox	18
2nd Song	Fin.K.L	Jo Hyang-gi	Come (와)	Lee Jung-hyun	—
Pair 2	Diamond	Park Goo-yoon	A Friend's Confession (친구의 고백)	2AM	3
Pair 2	Pearl	Hynn	A Friend's Confession (친구의 고백)	2AM	18
2nd Song	Diamond	Park Goo-yoon	After This Night (이 밤이 지나면)	Yim Jae-beom	—
Special	Diamond	Park Goo-yoon	Only Just (뿐이고)	Park Goo-yoon	—
Pair 3	Frustration	Kim Ga-young	Already One Year (벌써 일년)	Brown Eyes	12
Pair 3	Top	Joohoney of Monsta X	Already One Year (벌써 일년)	Brown Eyes	9
2nd Song	Top	Joohoney of Monsta X	Look at Me (나를 봐)	Lee Jung	—
Pair 4	Raspberry Wine	Yugyeom of Got7	I Choose to Love You (널 사랑하겠어)	Dongmulwon	10
Pair 4	Japanese Apricot	Kim Beom-ryong	I Choose to Love You (널 사랑하겠어)	Dongmulwon	11
2nd Song	Raspberry Wine	Yugyeom of Got7	I Have a Girlfriend (난 여자가 있는데)	Park Jin-young	—

Episode 258

Episode 258 was broadcast on June 7, 2020.

Order	Stage Name	Real Name	Song	Original artist	Vote
Round 2
Pair 1	S.E.S.	Jo Jeong-min	Desert Island (무인도)	Kim Choo-ja	2
Pair 1	Pearl	Hynn	A Smart Choice (현명한 선택)	So Chan-whee	19
Pair 2	Frustration	Kim Ga-young	I Didn't Weep Tears (눈물이 안났어)	Lim Jeong-hee	2
Pair 2	Japanese Apricot	Kim Beom-ryong	To Be Alone (홀로 된다는 것)	Byun Jin-sub	19
Round 3
Finalists	Pearl	Hynn	In the Dream (꿈에)	Lena Park	14
Finalists	Japanese Apricot	Kim Beom-ryong	Fix My Makeup (화장을 고치고)	Wax	7
Special	Japanese Apricot	Kim Beom-ryong	Wind Wind Wind (바람 바람 바람)	Kim Beom-ryong	—
Final
Battle	Pearl	Hynn	Previous three songs used as voting standard		15
Battle	Shield	Choi Jae-rim	Crow (갈무리)	Na Hoon-a	6

=== 130th Generation Mask King ===
- Contestants: Lena (singer, born 2002) (GWSN), Swings, So Yoo-mi, Kim Soo-chan, Kim Min-kyo, Park Hyung-joon, Kim Yeon-ja, Park Chan-sook
Episodes 259 – 260

Episode 259

Episode 259 was broadcast on June 14, 2020. This marks the beginning of the Hundred-thirtieth Generation.

Order	Stage Name	Real Name	Song	Original artist	Vote
Round 1
Pair 1	Goddess Gangrim	Lena of GWSN	Psycho	Red Velvet	10
Pair 1	Shortcut-shine Precipitation	Swings	Psycho	Red Velvet	11
2nd Song	Goddess Gangrim	Lena of GWSN	It Was Love (사랑이었다)	Zico	—
Pair 2	Wine	So Yoo-mi	Moonlight by the Window (달빛 창가에서)	City Boys	14
Pair 2	Makgeolli	Kim Soo-chan	Moonlight by the Window (달빛 창가에서)	City Boys	7
2nd Song	Makgeolli	Kim Soo-chan	Love Is a Cold Temptation (사랑은 차가운 유혹)	Yang Soo-kyung	—
Pair 3	Home Run	Kim Min-kyo	The Way (도)	Taesaja	12
Pair 3	Dunk Shot	Park Hyung-joon	The Way (도)	Taesaja	9
2nd Song	Dunk Shot	Park Hyung-joon	Confession (고백)	Hot Potato	—
Pair 4	Mrs. Rose	Kim Yeon-ja	At Any Time (무시로)	Na Hoon-a	20
Pair 4	Six Million Dollar Man	Park Chan-sook	At Any Time (무시로)	Na Hoon-a	1
2nd Song	Six Million Dollar Man	Park Chan-sook	Nest (동지)	Nam Jin	—

Episode 260

Episode 260 was broadcast on June 21, 2020.

Order	Stage Name	Real Name	Song	Original artist	Vote
Round 2
Pair 1	Shortcut-shine Precipitation	Swings	Peppermint Candy (박하사탕)	YB	3
Pair 1	Wine	So Yoo-mi	A Few Meters Ahead of (몇미터 앞에 두고)	Kim Sang-bae	18
Pair 2	Home Run	Kim Min-kyo	Unknown World (미지의 세계)	Cho Yong-pil	4
Pair 2	Mrs. Rose	Kim Yeon-ja	Everyone (여러분)	Yoon Bok-hee	17
Round 3
Finalists	Wine	So Yoo-mi	Golden Lady	Lim Jeong-hee	2
Finalists	Mrs. Rose	Kim Yeon-ja	Evergreen Tree (상록수)	Yang Hee-eun	19
Final
Battle	Mrs. Rose	Kim Yeon-ja	Previous three songs used as voting standard		11
Battle	Pearl	Hynn	Rough (Running Through Time) (시간을 달려서)	GFriend	10

=== 131st Generation Mask King ===
- Contestants: Seungah (Rainbow), Kim Chae-won (singer, born 1997) (April), Changbin (singer) (Stray Kids), Yang Dong-geun, Lee Jang-jun (Golden Child), Cha Jun-hwan, Kim Jung-min, Kang Jae-joon
Episodes 261 – 262

Episode 261

Episode 261 was broadcast on June 28, 2020. This marks the beginning of the Hundred-thirty-first Generation.

Order	Stage Name	Real Name	Song	Original artist	Vote
Round 1
Pair 1	Churros	Seungah of Rainbow	Be My Baby	Wonder Girls	9
Pair 1	Dalgona	Chaewon of April	Be My Baby	Wonder Girls	12
2nd Song	Churros	Seungah of Rainbow	Valenti	BoA	—
Pair 2	Private Second Class	Changbin of Stray Kids	Tic Tac Toe	Buga Kingz	5
Pair 2	Last-Year-Soldier	Yang Dong-geun	Tic Tac Toe	Buga Kingz	16
2nd Song	Private Second Class	Changbin of Stray Kids	Tomorrow	Tablo	—
Pair 3	Unopened Courier	Jangjun of Golden Child	As I Say (말하는 대로)	Sagging Snail (Yoo Jae-suk & Lee Juck)	18
Pair 3	Unscratched Lottery	Cha Jun-hwan	As I Say (말하는 대로)	Sagging Snail (Yoo Jae-suk & Lee Juck)	3
2nd Song	Unscratched Lottery	Cha Jun-hwan	Every Day, Every Moment (모든 날, 모든 순간) (Should We Kiss First? OST)	Paul Kim	—
Pair 4	Squid	Kim Jung-min	After Breaking Up (헤어진 후에)	Y2K	14
Pair 4	Peanut	Kang Jae-joon	After Breaking Up (헤어진 후에)	Y2K	7
2nd Song	Peanut	Kang Jae-joon	Endless Love (무한지애)	Kim Jung-min	—

Episode 262

Episode 262 was broadcast on July 5, 2020.

Order	Stage Name	Real Name	Song	Original artist	Vote
Round 2
Pair 1	Dalgona	Chaewon of April	We Used to Love (...사랑했잖아...)	Lyn	10
Pair 1	Last-Year-Soldier	Yang Dong-geun	Jazz Cafe (재즈카페)	Shin Hae-chul	11
Pair 2	Unopened Courier	Jangjun of Golden Child	I'm a Loner (외톨이야)	CNBLUE	3
Pair 2	Squid	Kim Jung-min	One Thing That I Know (내가 아는 한가지)	Lee Deok-jin	18
Round 3
Finalists	Last-Year-Soldier	Yang Dong-geun	Come Back Home	Seo Taiji and Boys	7
Finalists	Squid	Kim Jung-min	Malri Flower (말리꽃)	Lee Seung-chul	14
Final
Battle	Squid	Kim Jung-min	Previous three songs used as voting standard		2
Battle	Mrs. Rose	Kim Yeon-ja	The One Flower That Could Not Bloom (못다 핀 꽃 한 송이)	Kim Soo-chul	19

=== 132nd Generation Mask King ===
- Contestants: Shin A-lam, KittiB, Exy (Cosmic Girls), J-Black, Ha.E.D (singer, born 1975), Ahn Soo-ji (Banana Girl), Joosuc, Kim Seon-kyung
Episodes 263 – 264

Episode 263

Episode 263 was broadcast on July 12, 2020. This marks the beginning of the Hundred-thirty-second Generation.

Order	Stage Name	Real Name	Song	Original artist	Vote
Round 1
Pair 1	Cherry	Shin A-lam	Lonely	2NE1	2
Pair 1	Apricot	KittiB	Lonely	2NE1	19
2nd Song	Cherry	Shin A-lam	Maybe It's Not Our Fault (그건 아마 우리의 잘못은 아닐 거야)	Baek Ye-rin	—
Pair 2	Disco King	Exy of Cosmic Girls	Ae Song (애송이)	Lexy	13
Pair 2	Dancing King	J-Black	Ae Song (애송이)	Lexy	8
2nd Song	Dancing King	J-Black	We Are (시차)	Woo Won-jae ft. Gray ft. Loco	—
Pair 3	Chogye Noodles	Ha.E.D	I'll Give the Love That Stays with Me (내게 남은 사랑을 드릴게요)	Jang Hye-ri	9
Pair 3	Yeonpo-tang	Ahn Soo-ji of Banana Girl	I'll Give the Love That Stays with Me (내게 남은 사랑을 드릴게요)	Jang Hye-ri	12
2nd Song	Chogye Noodles	Ha.E.D	Obsession (집착)	Park Mi-kyung	—
Special	Chogye Noodles	Ha.E.D	Geenie (진이)	Ha.E.D	—
Pair 4	Conductor	Joosuc	I Love You (난 널 사랑해)	Shin Hyo-beom	3
Pair 4	Ji Hwa Ja	Kim Seon-kyung	I Love You (난 널 사랑해)	Shin Hyo-beom	18
2nd Song	Conductor	Joosuc	When I First Met You (너를 처음 만난 그때)	Park Joon-ha	—

Episode 264

Episode 264 was broadcast on July 19, 2020.

Order	Stage Name	Real Name	Song	Original artist	Vote
Round 2
Pair 1	Apricot	KittiB	I Need a Girl	Taeyang	9
Pair 1	Disco King	Exy of Cosmic Girls	Life is Good (인생은 즐거워)	Jessica H.O	12
Pair 2	Yeonpo-tang	Ahn Soo-ji of Banana Girl	Women (여자)	Big Mama	9
Pair 2	Ji Hwa Ja	Kim Seon-kyung	One Late Night in 1994 (1994년 어느 늦은 밤)	Jang Hye-jin	12
Special	Yeonpo-tang	Ahn Soo-ji of Banana Girl	Hips (엉덩이)	Banana Girl	—
Round 3
Finalists	Disco King	Exy of Cosmic Girls	Between the Lips (50cm) (입술 사이 (50 cm))	IU	8
Finalists	Ji Hwa Ja	Kim Seon-kyung	Spring Past (봄날은 간다)	Kim Yoon-ah	13
Final
Battle	Ji Hwa Ja	Kim Seon-kyung	Previous three songs used as voting standard		4
Battle	Mrs. Rose	Kim Yeon-ja	Whale Hunting (고래사냥)	Song Chang-sik	17

=== 133rd Generation Mask King ===
- Contestants: Ju Yeon-ho (Verivery), Bizzy, Lee Jeong-seob, KCM, Han Yi-jae, Kim Hyun-soo (singer, born 1987) (Forte di Quattro), Han Hye-jin, Yang Jung-a
Episodes 265 – 266

Episode 265

Episode 265 was broadcast on July 26, 2020. This marks the beginning of the Hundred-thirty-third Generation.

Order	Stage Name	Real Name	Song	Original artist	Vote
Round 1
Pair 1	Forward	Yeonho of Verivery	Perfect Man	Shinhwa	13
Pair 1	Backward	Bizzy	Perfect Man	Shinhwa	8
2nd Song	Backward	Bizzy	Aspirin (아스피린)	Girl	—
Pair 2	Gwigoksanjang	Lee Jeong-seob	You Wouldn't Know (당신은 모르실거야)	Hye Eun-yi	5
Pair 2	Haunted House	KCM	You Wouldn't Know (당신은 모르실거야)	Hye Eun-yi	16
2nd Song	Gwigoksanjang	Lee Jeong-seob	In the Air (허공)	Cho Yong-pil	—
Pair 3	U-Go-Girl	Han Yi-jae	Faraway, My Honey (님은 먼 곳에)	Kim Choo-ja	11
Pair 3	Ways to Avoid the Sun	Kim Hyun-soo of Forte di Quattro	Faraway, My Honey (님은 먼 곳에)	Kim Choo-ja	10
2nd Song	Ways to Avoid the Sun	Kim Hyun-soo of Forte di Quattro	For Your Soul (슬픈 영혼식)	Jo Sung-mo	—
Pair 4	Red Tissue	Han Hye-jin	The Face I Miss (보고싶은 얼굴)	Min Hae-kyung	17
Pair 4	Blue Tissue	Yang Jung-a	The Face I Miss (보고싶은 얼굴)	Min Hae-kyung	4
2nd Song	Blue Tissue	Yang Jung-a	Between Love and Friendship (사랑과 우정 사이)	Pinocchio	—

Episode 266

Episode 266 was broadcast on August 2, 2020.

Order	Stage Name	Real Name	Song	Original artist	Vote
Round 2
Pair 1	Forward	Yeonho of Verivery	Ending Scene (이런 엔딩)	IU	5
Pair 1	Haunted House	KCM	The Sky in the West (서쪽 하늘)	Lee Seung-chul	16
Pair 2	U-Go-Girl	Han Yi-jae	Garden Balsam Feelings (봉선화 연정)	Hyun Chul	10
Pair 2	Red Tissue	Han Hye-jin	Moon of Seoul (서울의 달)	Kim Gun-mo	11
Special	U-Go-Girl	Han Yi-jae	Local Train to Mokpo (목포행 완행열차)	Jang Yun-jeong	—
Round 3
Finalists	Haunted House	KCM	Once Upon a Day (하루)	Kim Bum-soo	13
Finalists	Red Tissue	Han Hye-jin	Memories of a Drink (한잔의 추억)	Lee Jang-hee	8
Special	Red Tissue	Han Hye-jin	Brown Memories (갈색추억)	Han Hye-jin	—
Final
Battle	Haunted House	KCM	Previous three songs used as voting standard		4
Battle	Mrs. Rose	Kim Yeon-ja	Nocturne (녹턴)	Lee Eun-mi	17

=== 134th Generation Mask King ===
- Contestants: Soyeon, Park Eun-ji, Shin Cheol (singer, born 1964) (Chuli and Miae), Cheetah, Jung Kyung-cheon, Min Woo-hyuk, Kwak Seung-nam (Indigo Music), Sean Lee
Episodes 267 – 268

Episode 267

Episode 267 was broadcast on August 9, 2020. This marks the beginning of the Hundred-thirty-fourth Generation.

Order	Stage Name	Real Name	Song	Original artist	Vote
Round 1
Pair 1	Diver	Park So-yeon	Naengmyeon (냉면)	Park Myung-soo and Jessica	19
Pair 1	Surfer	Park Eun-ji	Naengmyeon (냉면)	Park Myung-soo and Jessica	2
2nd Song	Surfer	Park Eun-ji	Bad Girl Good Girl	Miss A	—
Pair 2	Bachelor Ghost	Shin Cheol of Chuli and Miae	Eusha! Eusha! (으쌰! 으쌰!)	Shinhwa	8
Pair 2	Virgin Ghost	Cheetah	Eusha! Eusha! (으쌰! 으쌰!)	Shinhwa	13
2nd Song	Bachelor Ghost	Shin Cheol of Chuli and Miae	Hapjeong Station Exit 5 (합정역 5번 출구)	Yoo San-seul	—
Pair 3	Voice Color Sniper	Jung Kyung-cheon	Go to the Beach (해변으로 가요)	Key Boys	10
Pair 3	Voice Killer	Min Woo-hyuk	Go to the Beach (해변으로 가요)	Key Boys	11
2nd Song	Voice Color Sniper	Jung Kyung-cheon	Love Is Going That Far Away (사랑이 저만치 가네)	Kim Jong-chan	—
Pair 4	Summer, Please!	Kwak Seung-nam of Indigo	In Summer (여름 안에서)	Deux	18
Pair 4	Wow! It's Summer!	Sean Lee	In Summer (여름 안에서)	Deux	3
2nd Song	Wow! It's Summer!	Sean Lee	Emergency Room (응급실)	izi	—

Episode 268

Episode 268 was broadcast on August 16, 2020.

Order	Stage Name	Real Name	Song	Original artist	Vote
Round 2
Pair 1	Diver	Park So-yeon	Waiting (기다리다)	Younha	8
Pair 1	Virgin Ghost	Cheetah	Um Um Um (음음음)	J. Y. Park	13
Pair 2	Voice Killer	Min Woo-hyuk	Last Love (끝사랑)	Kim Bum-soo	19
Pair 2	Summer, Please!	Kwak Seung-nam of Indigo	Plastic Syndrome (플라스틱 신드롬)	Kim Jong-seo	2
Special	Summer, Please!	Kwak Seung-nam of Indigo	Summer, Please! (여름아 부탁해)	Indigo	—
Round 3
Finalists	Virgin Ghost	Cheetah	Strangers (타인)	Young Turks Club	7
Finalists	Voice Killer	Min Woo-hyuk	Please (제발)	Deulgukhwa	14
Final
Battle	Voice Killer	Min Woo-hyuk	Previous three songs used as voting standard		7
Battle	Mrs. Rose	Kim Yeon-ja	People Are More Beautiful Than Flowers (사람이 꽃보다 아름다워)	Ahn Chi-hwan	14

=== 135th Generation Mask King ===
- Contestants: Geum Jan-di, Kim Yang, Jin Hua, Nakjoon, Kim Song, U Sung-eun, Juri (Rocket Punch), Woodz
Episodes 269 – 270

Episode 269

Episode 269 was broadcast on August 23, 2020. This marks the beginning of the Hundred-thirty-fifth Generation.

Order	Stage Name	Real Name	Song	Original artist	Vote
Round 1
Pair 1	Wheat Noodles	Geum Jan-di	I Swear (다짐)	Jo Sung-mo	4
Pair 1	Suwon Wang-galbi	Kim Yang	I Swear (다짐)	Jo Sung-mo	17
2nd Song	Wheat Noodles	Geum Jan-di	Breakup with Her (그녀와의 이별)	Kim Hyun-jung	—
Pair 2	Retriever	Jin Hua	Empty (공허해)	Winner	6
Pair 2	Clubber	Nakjoon	Empty (공허해)	Winner	15
2nd Song	Retriever	Jin Hua	Like Rain, Like Music (비처럼 음악처럼)	Kim Hyun-sik	—
Pair 3	Five Stars!	Kim Song	In the Bus (버스 안에서)	Zaza	5
Pair 3	Great	U Sung-eun	In the Bus (버스 안에서)	Zaza	16
2nd Song	Five Stars!	Kim Song	One and a Half (일과 이분의 일)	Two Two	—
Pair 4	Sweeping	Juri of Rocket Punch	To My Youth (나의 사춘기에게)	Bolbbalgan4	4
Pair 4	Three GO	Woodz	To My Youth (나의 사춘기에게)	Bolbbalgan4	17
2nd Song	Three GO	Juri of Rocket Punch	Dear Name (이름에게)	IU	—

Episode 270

Episode 270 was broadcast on August 30, 2020.

Order	Stage Name	Real Name	Song	Original artist	Vote
Round 2
Pair 1	Suwon Wang-galbi	Kim Yang	Break Me Down (소리쳐봐)	Hyun Jin-young	14
Pair 1	Clubber	Nakjoon	Nothing Better	Brown Eyed Soul	7
Pair 2	Great	U Sung-eun	Nocturne (야상곡)	Kim Yoon-ah	13
Pair 2	Three GO	Woodz	Already Sad Love (이미 슬픈 사랑)	Yada	8
Round 3
Finalists	Suwon Wang-galbi	Kim Yang	Love Is (사랑은)	Leessang ft. Jung-in	2
Finalists	Great	U Sung-eun	I Will Go to You Like the First Snow (첫눈처럼 너에게 가겠다)	Ailee	19
Final
Battle	Great	U Sung-eun	Previous three songs used as voting standard		8
Battle	Mrs. Rose	Kim Yeon-ja	Mother (어매)	Na Hoon-a	13

=== 136th Generation Mask King ===
- Contestants: Han Seung-woo (Victon), Kim San-ho, Nam Seung-min, Ahn Sung-hoon, Park Bo-ram, Chae Eun-jung (Cleo), Kim Jung-eun, Nam Hyun-joon
Episodes 271 – 272

Episode 271

Episode 271 was broadcast on September 6, 2020. This marks the beginning of the Hundred-thirty-sixth Generation.

Order	Stage Name	Real Name	Song	Original artist	Vote
Round 1
Pair 1	Blue Flag	Han Seung-woo of Victon	Move Dating (조조할인)	Lee Moon-sae	17
Pair 1	White Flag	Kim San-ho	Move Dating (조조할인)	Lee Moon-sae	4
2nd Song	White Flag	Kim San-ho	Rebirth (환생)	Yoon Jong-shin	—
Pair 2	A Thousand Years of Love	Nam Seung-min	Passion (열정)	Seven	5
Pair 2	Forbidden Love	Ahn Sung-hoon	Passion (열정)	Seven	16
2nd Song	A Thousand Years of Love	Nam Seung-min	La La La (라라라)	SG Wannabe	—
Pair 3	Golden Spoon	Park Bo-ram	Happy Me (행복한 나를)	Eco	14
Pair 3	Silver Hairtail	Chae Eun-jung of Cleo	Happy Me (행복한 나를)	Eco	7
2nd Song	Silver Hairtail	Chae Eun-jung of Cleo	Let's Not Meet Again (마주치지 말자)	Jang Hye-jin	—
Pair 4	Hidden Objects	Kim Jung-eun	If I Hold You in My Arms (너를 품에 안으면)	Cult	19
Pair 4	Minesweeper	Nam Hyun-joon	If I Hold You in My Arms (너를 품에 안으면)	Cult	2
2nd Song	Minesweeper	Nam Hyun-joon	Sad Mannequin (슬픈 마네킹)	Hyun Jin-young and Wawa	—

Episode 272

Episode 272 was broadcast on September 13, 2020.

Order	Stage Name	Real Name	Song	Original artist	Vote
Round 2
Pair 1	Blue Flag	Han Seung-woo of Victon	Caffeine (카페인)	Yang Yo-seob ft. Yong Jun-hyung	3
Pair 1	Forbidden Love	Ahn Sung-hoon	Everything Was You (전부 너였다)	Noel	18
Pair 2	Golden Spoon	Park Bo-ram	Please (제발)	Lee So-ra	7
Pair 2	Hidden Objects	Kim Jung-eun	Because I'm a Girl (여자이니까)	Kiss	14
Round 3
Finalists	Forbidden Love	Ahn Sung-hoon	Throw Away (연)	Big Mama	10
Finalists	Hidden Objects	Kim Jung-eun	Round and Round (빙글빙글)	Na-mi	11
Final
Battle	Hidden Objects	Kim Jung-eun	Previous three songs used as voting standard		12
Battle	Mrs. Rose	Kim Yeon-ja	I Need You (니가 필요해)	K.Will	9

=== 137th Generation Mask King ===
- Contestants: Joomin (Bijou), Ricky (South Korean singer) (Teen Top), Kim Hyunjin (Loona), Lee Hyung-taik, Shim Hyung-rae, Choi Ran, Yang Yo-seob (Highlight), Lee Hye-sung
Episodes 273 – 274

Episode 273

Episode 273 was broadcast on September 20, 2020. This marks the beginning of the Hundred-thirty-seventh Generation.

Order	Stage Name	Real Name	Song	Original artist	Vote
Round 1
Pair 1	Jwibulnori	Joomin of Bijou	Gift (선물)	UN	3
Pair 1	Fireworks	Ricky of Teen Top	Gift (선물)	UN	18
2nd Song	Jwibulnori	Joomin of Bijou	The Day After You Left (헤어진 다음날)	Lee Hyun-woo	—
Pair 2	Jade Bead	Kim Hyunjin of Loona	When the Cold Wind Blows (찬바람이 불면)	Kim Ji-yeon	18
Pair 2	Kitty Tail	Lee Hyung-taik	When the Cold Wind Blows (찬바람이 불면)	Kim Ji-yeon	3
2nd Song	Kitty Tail	Lee Hyung-taik	Gypsy Woman (집시여인)	Lee Chi-hyun & His Friends	—
Pair 3	Black Horse	Shim Hyung-rae	Ripe Persimmon (홍시(울엄마))	Na Hoon-a	13
Pair 3	White Horse	Choi Ran	Ripe Persimmon (홍시(울엄마))	Na Hoon-a	8
2nd Song	White Horse	Choi Ran	The Man in Yellow Shirt (노란 샤쓰의 사나이)	Han Myung-sook	—
Pair 4	Buttumak Cat	Yang Yo-seob of Highlight	I Knew that I Love You (사랑하게 될 줄 알았어)	Shin Hyo-beom	17
Pair 4	Seodang Dog	Lee Hye-sung	I Knew that I Love You (사랑하게 될 줄 알았어)	Shin Hyo-beom	4
2nd Song	Seodang Dog	Lee Hye-sung	17171771	Jaurim	—

Episode 274

Episode 274 was broadcast on September 27, 2020.

Order	Stage Name	Real Name	Song	Original artist	Vote
Round 2
Pair 1	Fireworks	Ricky of Teen Top	You're Here Too (그대도 여기에)	Im Chang-jung	13
Pair 1	Jade Bead	Kim Hyunjin of Loona	Fox (여우야)	The Classic	8
Pair 2	Black Horse	Shim Hyung-rae	Cotton Fields	Creedence Clearwater Revival	2
Pair 2	Buttumak Cat	Yang Yo-seob of Highlight	It's Only Love (사랑일뿐야)	Kim Min-woo	19
Round 3
Finalists	Fireworks	Ricky of Teen Top	Same Pillow (같은 베개)	Tei	1
Finalists	Buttumak Cat	Yang Yo-seob of Highlight	Station (정류장)	Panic	20
Final
Battle	Buttumak Cat	Yang Yo-seob of Highlight	Previous three songs used as voting standard		16
Battle	Hidden Objects	Kim Jung-eun	In the Dead of the Night (모두 잠든 후에)	Kim Won-jun	5

=== 138th Generation Mask King ===
- Contestants: Seo Soo-nam, Sleepy, Kwak Min-jeong, Kei (Lovelyz), Hyun Young, Kim Kyung-jin, SoMyung, Hong Jam-eon
Episodes 275 – 276

Episode 275

Episode 275 was broadcast on October 4, 2020. This marks the beginning of the Hundred-thirty-eighth Generation.

Order	Stage Name	Real Name	Song	Original artist	Vote
Round 1
Pair 1	Hung-chit-chit	Seo Soo-nam	Like Those Powerful Salmons That Come Against the River (거꾸로 강을 거슬러 오르는 저 힘찬 연어들처럼)	Kang San-ae	3
Pair 1	Good For You, Really	Sleepy	Like Those Powerful Salmons That Come Against the River (거꾸로 강을 거슬러 오르는 저 힘찬 연어들처럼)	Kang San-ae	18
2nd Song	Hung-chit-chit	Seo Soo-nam	We Are (우리는)	Song Chang-sik	—
Pair 2	The Lion	Kwak Min-jeong	Violet Fragrance (보랏빛향기)	Kang Susie	5
Pair 2	Gaksital	Kei of Lovelyz	Violet Fragrance (보랏빛향기)	Kang Susie	16
2nd Song	The Lion	Kwak Min-jeong	You're to Me And I'm to You (The Classic OST) (너에게 난, 나에게 넌)	Jatanpung	—
Pair 3	Janggu Girl	Hyun Young	Safety (안부)	Byul & Na Yoon-kwon	20
Pair 3	Ajaeng Man	Kim Kyung-jin	Safety (안부)	Byul & Na Yoon-kwon	1
2nd Song	Ajaeng Man	Kim Kyung-jin	I Have No Problem (나는 문제 없어)	Hwang Gyu-young	—
Pair 4	Dumbfounded	SoMyung	Dear Young (젊은 그대)	Kim Soo-chul	9
Pair 4	Mett-Dol	Hong Jam-eon	Dear Young (젊은 그대)	Kim Soo-chul	12
2nd Song	Dumbfounded	SoMyung	Stand Up (일어나)	Kim Kwang-seok	—
Special	Dumbfounded	SoMyung	Bye Bye Ya (빠이빠이야)	SoMyung	—

Episode 276

Episode 276 was broadcast on October 11, 2020.

Order	Stage Name	Real Name	Song	Original artist	Vote
Round 2
Pair 1	Good For You, Really	Sleepy	After We Broke (사랑한 후에)	Shin Sung-woo	5
Pair 1	Gaksital	Kei of Lovelyz	Fate (인연)	Lee Sun-hee	16
Pair 2	Janggu Girl	Hyun Young	Meaning of You (너의 의미)	Sanulrim	8
Pair 2	Mett-Dol	Hong Jam-eon	Just Trust Me (오빠만 믿어)	Park Hyun-bin	13
Special	Janggu Girl	Hyun Young	Sister's Dream (누나의 꿈)	Hyun Young	—
Round 3
Finalists	Gaksital	Kei of Lovelyz	The Lonely Bloom Stands Alone (시든 꽃에 물을 주듯)	Hynn	16
Finalists	Mett-Dol	Hong Jam-eon	Nemo's Dream (네모의 꿈)	White	5
Final
Battle	Gaksital	Kei of Lovelyz	Previous three songs used as voting standard		10
Battle	Buttumak Cat	Yang Yo-seob of Highlight	As Time Goes By (세월이 가면)	Choi Ho-seop	11

=== 139th Generation Mask King ===
- Contestants: Jin Si-mon, Shin Seung-hwan, Lee Dae-won, Hwang Chan-seob, Yezi, Soohyun (U-KISS), Ahn Ye-eun, Mino (singer) (Free Style)
Episodes 277 – 278

Episode 277

Episode 277 was broadcast on October 18, 2020. This marks the beginning of the Hundred-thirty-ninth Generation.

Order	Stage Name	Real Name	Song	Original artist	Vote
Round 1
Pair 1	Yeosu Night Sea	Jin Si-mon	You That Meet Unexpectedly (어쩌다 마주친 그대)	Songgolmae	16
Pair 1	Train for Chuncheon	Shin Seung-hwan	You That Meet Unexpectedly (어쩌다 마주친 그대)	Songgolmae	5
2nd Song	Train for Chuncheon	Shin Seung-hwan	Spring Days of My Life (내 생애 봄날은)	Can	—
Pair 2	A Match of Ssireum	Lee Dae-won	Love Fool (사랑의 바보)	The Nuts	18
Pair 2	A Plate of Eggs	Hwang Chan-seop	Love Fool (사랑의 바보)	The Nuts	3
2nd Song	A Plate of Eggs	Hwang Chan-seop	Delete (삭제)	Lee Seung-gi	—
Pair 3	Dynamite	Yezi	Dynamite	BTS	10
Pair 3	Ammonite	Soohyun of U-KISS	Dynamite	BTS	11
2nd Song	Dynamite	Yezi	Rose	Lee Hi	—
Pair 4	Ring Expedition	Ahn Ye-eun	T.O.P.	Shinhwa	11
Pair 4	Refund Expedition	Mino of Free Style	T.O.P.	Shinhwa	10
2nd Song	Refund Expedition	Mino of Free Style	I'll Become Dust (먼지가 되어)	Lee Miki	—

Episode 278

Episode 278 was broadcast on October 25, 2020.

Order	Stage Name	Real Name	Song	Original artist	Vote
Round 2
Pair 1	Yeosu Night Sea	Jin Si-mon	Where is the End of Your Separation (이별의 끝은 어디인가요)	Yang Soo-kyung	9
Pair 1	A Match of Ssireum	Lee Dae-won	Dance with Wolf (늑대와 함께 춤을)	Im Chang-jung	12
Pair 2	Ammonite	Soohyun of U-KISS	I Hope (바래)	F.T. Island	7
Pair 2	Ring Expedition	Ahn Ye-eun	Choice (선택)	Baek Ji-young	14
Round 3
Finalists	A Match of Ssireum	Lee Dae-won	Don't Forget (잊지 말아요)	Baek Ji-young	4
Finalists	Ring Expedition	Ahn Ye-eun	Four Seasons (사계)	Taeyeon	17
Final
Battle	Ring Expedition	Ahn Ye-eun	Previous three songs used as voting standard		5
Battle	Buttumak Cat	Yang Yo-seob of Highlight	When Our Lives Are Almost Over (우리 앞의 생이 끝나갈때)	Infinite Track	16

=== 140th Generation Mask King ===
- Contestants: Yuqi ((G)I-dle), HaEun (singer, born March 1994), Epaksa, Wi Il-cheong, Minhyuk (Monsta X), Ryu Hwa-young, Seo Dong-joo, Jeon Won-joo
Episodes 279 – 280

Episode 279

Episode 279 was broadcast on November 1, 2020. This marks the beginning of the Hundred-fortieth Generation.

Order	Stage Name	Real Name	Song	Original artist	Vote
Round 1
Pair 1	Pineapple Pizza	Yuqi of (G)I-dle	Holo (홀로)	Lee Hi	7
Pair 1	Mint Choco	HaEun	Holo (홀로)	Lee Hi	14
2nd Song	Pineapple Pizza	Yuqi of (G)I-dle	Missing You (그리워해요)	2NE1	—
Pair 2	Firefly	Epaksa	For Love (사랑을 위하여)	Kim Jong-hwan	4
Pair 2	Sintobuli	Wi Il-cheong	For Love (사랑을 위하여)	Kim Jong-hwan	17
2nd Song	Firefly	Epaksa	Love Grass (풀잎사랑)	Choi Sung-soo	—
Special	Firefly	Epaksa	Monkey Magic (몽키매직)	Epaksa	—
Pair 3	Vinous-throated Parrotbill	Minhyuk of Monsta X	Love Alone (혼자하는 사랑)	Ann	17
Pair 3	Oriental Stork	Ryu Hwa-young	Love Alone (혼자하는 사랑)	Ann	4
2nd Song	Oriental Stork	Ryu Hwa-young	Childish Adult (어른 아이)	Gummy	—
Pair 4	Red Chili Paste	Seo Dong-joo	Meeting (만남)	Noh Sa-yeon	4
Pair 4	Soybean Paste	Jeon Won-joo	Meeting (만남)	Noh Sa-yeon	17
2nd Song	Red Chili Paste	Seo Dong-joo	Only Walk the Flower Road (꽃길만 걷게 해줄게)	Daybreak	—

Episode 280

Episode 280 was broadcast on November 8, 2020.

Order	Stage Name	Real Name	Song	Original artist	Vote
Round 2
Pair 1	Mint Choco	HaEun	Farewell Under the Sun (대낮에 한 이별)	Park Jin-young & Sunye	12
Pair 1	Sintobuli	Wi Il-cheong	I Can't Quite Put My Finger on It (뭐라고 딱 꼬집어 얘기할 수 없어요)	Love and Peace	9
Special	Sintobuli	Wi Il-cheong	So Now (ft. So Chan-whee) (이제는)	Seoul Family	—
Pair 2	Vinous-throated Parrotbill	Minhyuk of Monsta X	Even Loved the Pain (그 아픔까지 사랑한거야)	Jo Jeong-hyun	14
Pair 2	Soybean Paste	Jeon Won-joo	What's Wrong with My Age (내 나이가 어때서)	Oh Seung-geun	7
Round 3
Finalists	Mint Choco	HaEun	I Do	Rain	15
Finalists	Vinous-throated Parrotbill	Minhyuk of Monsta X	I Have to Forget You (슬픔속에 그댈 지워야만 해)	Lee Hyun-woo	6
Final
Battle	Mint Choco	HaEun	Previous three songs used as voting standard		10
Battle	Buttumak Cat	Yang Yo-seob of Highlight	Ask Myself (물어본다)	Lee Seung-hwan	11

=== 141st Generation Mask King ===
- Contestants: Kal So-won, Jaechan (DKZ), Joo Da-in (JuJu Club), Yeom Kyung-hwan, Kim Lip (singer) (Loona), Seo Jeong-hee (actress), Woo Ji-yoon (singer) (Bolbbalgan4), Penomeco
Episodes 281 – 282

Episode 281

Episode 281 was broadcast on November 15, 2020. This marks the beginning of the Hundred-forty-first Generation.

Order	Stage Name	Real Name	Song	Original artist	Vote
Round 1
Pair 1	Pure Comics	Kal So-won	Last Goodbye (오랜 날 오랜 밤)	AKMU	11
Pair 1	Cheerful Comics	Jaechan of Dongkiz	Last Goodbye (오랜 날 오랜 밤)	AKMU	10
2nd Song	Cheerful Comics	Jaechan of Dongkiz	Officially Missing You	Geeks	—
Pair 2	Tango	Joo Da-in of JuJu Club	Wind Wind Wind (바람 바람 바람)	Kim Beom-ryong	18
Pair 2	Jitterbug	Yeom Kyung-hwan	Wind Wind Wind (바람 바람 바람)	Kim Beom-ryong	3
2nd Song	Jitterbug	Yeom Kyung-hwan	Romance (연애)	Kim Hyun-chul	—
Pair 3	Balloon Gum	Kim Lip of Loona	Wind Please Stop Blowing (바람아 멈추어다오)	Lee Ji-yeon	17
Pair 3	Marshmallows	Seo Jeong-hee	Wind Please Stop Blowing (바람아 멈추어다오)	Lee Ji-yeon	4
2nd Song	Marshmallows	Seo Jeong-hee	I Don't Know Anything But Love (사랑밖엔 난 몰라)	Sim Soo-bong	—
Pair 4	Abracadabra	Woo Ji-yoon	Really Really	Winner	8
Pair 4	Yabalabahigiya Mohaimohairura	Penomeco	Really Really	Winner	13
2nd Song	Abracadabra	Woo Ji-yoon	Nappa (나빠)	Crush	—

Episode 282

Episode 282 was broadcast on November 22, 2020.

Order	Stage Name	Real Name	Song	Original artist	Vote
Round 2
Pair 1	Pure Comics	Kal So-won	Just Like First Sight (처음 그 느낌처럼)	Shin Seung-hun	10
Pair 1	Tango	Joo Da-in of JuJu Club	Waiting Everyday (매일 매일 기다려)	T△S	11
Pair 2	Balloon Gum	Kim Lip of Loona	Want and Resent (원하고 원망하죠)	As One	8
Pair 2	Yabalabahigiya Mohaimohairura	Penomeco	How You Like That	Blackpink	13
Round 3
Finalists	Tango	Joo Da-in of JuJu Club	My Own Your Shape (나만의 그대 모습)	B612	4
Finalists	Yabalabahigiya Mohaimohairura	Penomeco	Eyes, Nose, Lips (눈, 코, 입)	Taeyang	17
Special	Tango	Joo Da-in of JuJu Club	I Am Me (나는 나)	JuJu Club	—
Final
Battle	Yabalabahigiya Mohaimohairura	Penomeco	Previous three songs used as voting standard		1
Battle	Buttumak Cat	Yang Yo-seob of Highlight	Adult (My Mister OST) (어른)	Sondia	20

=== 142nd Generation Mask King ===
- Contestants: Denise Kim (Secret Number), Ryang Ha (singer) (Ryang Hyun Ryang Ha), Yedam (Treasure), Yoo So-young, Im Joo-ri, Wang Seok-hyeon, Muwoong (Baechigi), Louie (Geeks)
Episodes 283 – 284

Episode 283

Episode 283 was broadcast on November 29, 2020. This marks the beginning of the Hundred-forty-second Generation.

Order	Stage Name	Real Name	Song	Original artist	Vote
Round 1
Pair 1	Music Note	Denise of Secret Number	I Don't Love You (널 사랑하지 않아)	Urban Zakapa	16
Pair 1	Comma	Ryang Ha of Ryang Hyun Ryang Ha	I Don't Love You (널 사랑하지 않아)	Urban Zakapa	5
2nd Song	Comma	Ryang Ha of Ryang Hyun Ryang Ha	To Mother (어머님께)	g.o.d	—
Special	Comma	Ryang Ha of Ryang Hyun Ryang Ha	I Didn't Go to School! (학교를 안갔어)	Ryang Hyun Ryang Ha	—
Pair 2	High School Senior	Yedam of Treasure	Sorrow (애상)	Cool	16
Pair 2	Gosa	Yoo So-young	Sorrow (애상)	Cool	5
2nd Song	Gosa	Yoo So-young	It Would Be Good (좋을텐데)	Sung Si-kyung	—
Pair 3	Bongsun Yi	Im Joo-ri	Bongsook (봉숙이)	Rose Motel	18
Pair 3	Bongsook	Wang Seok-hyeon	Bongsook (봉숙이)	Rose Motel	3
2nd Song	Bongsook	Wang Seok-hyeon	Amazing You (그대라는 사치)	Han Dong-geun	—
Pair 4	Rice Pancake	Muwoong of Baechigi	Ballerino	Leessang	12
Pair 4	Memil-muk	Louie of Geeks	Ballerino	Leessang	9
2nd Song	Memil-muk	Louie of Geeks	For Lovers who Hesitate (주저하는 연인들을 위해)	Jannabi	—

Episode 284

Episode 284 was broadcast on December 6, 2020.

Order	Stage Name	Real Name	Song	Original artist	Vote
Round 2
Pair 1	Music Note	Denise of Secret Number	Make Up	Sam Kim ft. Crush	12
Pair 1	High School Senior	Yedam of Treasure	My Love	Lee Seung-chul	9
Pair 2	Bongsun Yi	Im Joo-ri	The Lost Umbrella (잃어버린 우산)	Woo Soon-sil	10
Pair 2	Rice Pancake	Muwoong of Baechigi	Highway Romance (고속도로 Romance)	Yoon Jong-shin	11
Special	Bongsun Yi	Im Joo-ri	Wearing Dark Lipstick (립스틱 짙게 바르고)	Im Joo-ri	—
Round 3
Finalists	Music Note	Denise of Secret Number	On	BTS	13
Finalists	Rice Pancake	Muwoong of Baechigi	One Flew Over the Cuckoo's Nest (뻐꾸기 둥지위로 날아간 새)	Kim Gun-mo	8
Final
Battle	Music Note	Denise of Secret Number	Previous three songs used as voting standard		6
Battle	Buttumak Cat	Yang Yo-seob of Highlight	To Me (내게로)	Jang Hye-jin	15

=== 143rd Generation Mask King ===
- Contestants: Nancy (Momoland), Mihal Ashminov, Samuel Seo, Choi Hwan-hee, Hwang Gyu-young, Shin Jin-sik, Seo Kwon-soon, Taru
Episodes 285 – 286

Episode 285

Episode 285 was broadcast on December 13, 2020. This marks the beginning of the Hundred-forty-third Generation.

Order	Stage Name	Real Name	Song	Original artist	Vote
Round 1
Pair 1	Jingle Bell	Nancy of Momoland	Do You Want to Build a Snowman?	Kristen Bell & Agatha Lee Monn & Katie Lopez	20
Pair 1	Golden Bell	Mihal Ashminov	Do You Want to Build a Snowman?	Kristen Bell & Agatha Lee Monn & Katie Lopez	1
2nd Song	Golden Bell	Mihal Ashminov	Weeds (잡초)	Na Huna	—
Pair 2	Manhole	Samuel Seo	Day Day	Bewhy ft. Jay Park	14
Pair 2	Black Hole	Choi Hwan-hee	Day Day	Bewhy ft. Jay Park	7
2nd Song	Black Hole	Choi Hwan-hee	Bar Code (바코드)	Haon & Vinxen	—
Pair 3	JinBbang	Hwang Gyu-young	Jealousy (질투)	Yoo Seung-beom	16
Pair 3	GonggalBang	Shin Jin-sik	Jealousy (질투)	Yoo Seung-beom	5
2nd Song	GonggalBang	Shin Jin-sik	Blissful Confession (황홀한 고백)	Yoon Soo-il	—
Pair 4	Solo Heaven	Seo Kwon-soon	Teahouse of the Winter (그 겨울의 찻집)	Cho Yong-pil	2
Pair 4	Couple Hell	Taru	Teahouse of the Winter (그 겨울의 찻집)	Cho Yong-pil	19
2nd Song	Solo Heaven	Seo Kwon-soon	About Five Hundred Years (한오백년)	—N/a	—

Episode 286

Episode 286 was broadcast on December 20, 2020.

Order	Stage Name	Real Name	Song	Original artist	Vote
Round 2
Pair 1	Jingle Bell	Nancy of Momoland	Atlantis Princess (아틀란티스 소녀)	BoA	5
Pair 1	Manhole	Samuel Seo	Two Melodies (뻔한 멜로디)	Zion.T ft. Crush	16
Pair 2	JinBbang	Hwang Gyu-young	Can't Sleep Night (잠도 오지 않는 밤에)	Lee Seung-chul	2
Pair 2	Couple Hell	Taru	Sorry, I Hate You (미안해 널 미워해)	Jaurim	19
Round 3
Finalists	Manhole	Samuel Seo	Smiling Angel (미소천사)	Sung Si-kyung	9
Finalists	Couple Hell	Taru	Nilily Mambo (늴리리 맘보)	Kim Jeong-ae	12
Final
Battle	Couple Hell	Taru	Previous three songs used as voting standard		3
Battle	Buttumak Cat	Yang Yo-seob of Highlight	End of a Day (하루의 끝)	Jonghyun	18

=== 144th Generation Mask King ===
- Contestants: Elly (Weki Meki), Jeong Minseong (La Poem), Heo Chan (Victon), Outsider, Nam Hyun-hee, Shin Hyun-woo (Sohodae), Park Nam-jung, Jung Dong-nam
Episode 287

Episode 287 was broadcast on December 27, 2020. This marks the beginning of the Hundred-forty-fourth Generation.

Order	Stage Name	Real Name	Song	Original artist	Vote
Round 1
Pair 1	2020 Was Tough, Rat!	Elly of Weki Meki	That Man, That Woman (그 남자 그 여자)	Vibe	8
Pair 1	2021 Cheer Up, Ox!	Jeong Minseong of La Poem	That Man, That Woman (그 남자 그 여자)	Vibe	13
2nd Song	2020 Was Tough, Rat!	Elly of Weki Meki	Don't Flirt (끼부리지마)	Winner	—
Pair 2	Miracles in December	Chan of Victon	Snail (달팽이)	Panic	15
Pair 2	The Last Leaf	Outsider	Snail (달팽이)	Panic	6
2nd Song	The Last Leaf	Outsider	Hayeoga (하여가)	Seo Taiji and Boys	—
Special	The Last Leaf	Outsider	Loner (외톨이)	Outsider	—
Pair 3	Already A Year	Nam Hyun-hee	Couple (커플)	Sechs Kies	6
Pair 3	Countdown	Shin Hyun-woo of Sohodae	Couple (커플)	Sechs Kies	15
2nd Song	Already A Year	Nam Hyun-hee	I Don't Know Yet What Love Is (난 사랑을 아직 몰라)	Lee Ji-yeon	—
Pair 4	The Twelfth Brother	Park Nam-jung	The Dance in Rhythm (리듬 속의 그 춤을)	Kim Wan-sun	15
Pair 4	The Ten Commandments	Jung Dong-nam	The Dance in Rhythm (리듬 속의 그 춤을)	Kim Wan-sun	6
2nd Song	The Ten Commandments	Jung Dong-nam	Tes Bros (테스형)	Na Hoon-a	—
