= Around Thirty =

"Around Thirty" (Korean: 서른 즈음에) is a song written and composed by Seung-Won Kang, and popularly sung by Kim Kwang-Seok. It is one of the songs from Kim's fourth album, and is in the folk music genre.

Many Korean singers have "remade" the song; there are 24 songs with the same name. Tiger JK announced in the Kim Kwang-Suk 12th Memorial Concert that his song "Thumb" was inspired by "Around Thirty".

In 2007, the song was hailed by music critics as having the best lyrics.

== See also ==
- "The Private's Letter"
