= Kim Kwang-Seok Fourth =

Studio album by Kim Kwang-seok
- Released: June 25, 1994
- Genre: Folk
- Language: Korean
- Label: King; Mediopia

Kim Kwang-seok studio album chronology
Kim Kwang-Seok 3rd Music Collection (1992)	Kim Kwang-Seok Fourth (1994)

Kim Kwang-Seok Fourth is the fourth and final eponymous studio album by South Korean singer-songwriter Kim Kwang-seok.

== Track listing ==
Side A
No.	Title	Lyrics	Music	Length
1.	"일어나" (Wake Up)	Kim Kwang-seok	Kim Kwang-seok	4:30
2.	"바람이 불어오는 곳" (The Place Where The Wind Blows From)	Kim Kwang-seok	Kim Kwang-seok	3:22
3.	"너무 깊이 생각하지 마" (Don't Think Too Deep)	Kim Chang-gee	Kim Chang-gee	3:55
4.	"회귀" (Return)	Kim Chi-ha	Hwang Nan-ju	3:33
5.	"너무 아픈 사랑은 사랑이 아니었음을" (Love that Hurt Too Much Wasn't Love)	Ryu Geun	Kim Kwang-seok	6:10

Side B
No.	Title	Writer(s)	Length
1.	"서른 즈음에" (Around Thirty)	Kang Seung-won	4:43
2.	"혼자 남은 밤" (The Night Left Alone)	Park Yong-joon	4:38
3.	"끊어진 길" (The Broken-Down Road)	Lee Moo-ha	3:29
4.	"맑고 향기롭게" (To be Clear And Good-Smelled)	Noh Young-shim	3:39
5.	"자유롭게" (Freely)	Kim Kwang-seok	4:54
