= Taesaja =

1997–2001 South Korean boy group

Taesaja (태사자)
- Years active: October 20, 1997-November 1, 2001
- Label: Yejeon Media
- Past members: Kim Hyung-jun: Lee Dong-yoon; Park Jun-seok; Kim Young-min

Taesaja (Korean: 태사자; Hanja: 太四子), meaning "four big men," was a South Korean boy group which debuted in 1997 and disbanded in 2001. It consisted of four members: Hyung-jun, Dong-yoon, Jun-seok, and Young-min. Wearing suits and kendo uniform inspired outfits, Taesaja gained prominence with their hit songs "The Way" (also known as "Do") and "Time," and rivaled the boy group NRG. Each of the members had their own representative Chinese character: Hyung-jun was 天 ("heaven"), Dong-yoon was 雨 ("rain"), Jun-seok was 雲 ("cloud"), and Young-min was 風 ("wind"). Over the span of four years, they released four studio albums and a compilation album. Taesaja disbanded early, only four years after their debut. In 2019, the group came back into the spotlight by performing on Two Yoo Project Sugar Man 3.

== History ==
=== 1997: Taesaja, Vol.1 ===
Taesaja debuted with "The Way" in the October of 1997. Not long after, the group released their debut album Taesaja, Vol. 1 on November 27, 1997. It featured two of their most popular songs: "The Way" and "Time." The former was composed by Jang Young-jin, who also composed "Candy" by H.O.T..

=== 1998:Taesaja, Vol. 2 ===
Taesaja's popularity took off in 1998. On the KMTV show Power Chart, interviewed teenagers ranked "The Way" as the third most popular song among rookie group releases. Additionally, Taesaja performed "The Way" on Gayo Top 10 with the song peaking at the #6 spot. Later that year, their second album was released, titled Taesaja, Vol. 2. "Time" won the group their first award this year, and they won two rookie awards from SBS Gayo Daejun and Golden Disk Awards for video album. In May, Taesaja's popularity won them a spot on the Dream Concert lineup.

On October 17, Taesaja performed at 'Love Concert,' a charity event for children facing food insecurity. The concert lineup was abundant with popular artists, such as H.O.T., Fin.K.L, Sechs kies, Kim Kyung-ho, and Kim Hyun-jung. Another charity effort by the group was featuring on a collaborative Christian gospel album. Titled "Save Our People," the album served to raise funds for assistance for North Korean defectors. Taesaja's contribution was a cover of "Lord I Lift Your Name on High" with their own pop twist to the Christian worship song.

=== 1999-2001: 2000-1, Leap and Forever History ===
After a 7 month hiatus, Taesaja released their third album titled 2000-1 July 1999. The following year, the group's forth album, Leap (also translated as Leaping Out), was released. Alongside this release, the group had a brand deal with the streetwear brand 1492 Miles. Taesaja announced their disbandment November 2001 and released a compilation album titled Forever History.

=== 2002-present: After Taesaja ===
In 2019, Taesaja reunited to perform on Two Yoo Project Sugar Man 3. In 2020, the members got back together, save Dong-joon who was in the United States, to perform "The Way" on Immortal Songs: Singing the Legend. The same year, member Dong-yoon was accused of bullying and theft as a middle schooler. He released an official statement apologizing for his actions. In 2024, Taesaja performed "The Way" and "Time" on Open Concert for "Back to the 90's." The group performed there again in 2025 with the same songs.

== Members ==
Members
Stage name	Real name	Chinese character	Born	Position
Hyung-jun (형준)	Kim Hyung-jun (김형준)	天	May 4, 1977	Leader, vocalist, rapper
Dong-yoon (동윤)	Lee Dong-yoon (이동윤)	雨	May 25, 1978	Vocalist, rapper
Jun-seok (준석)	Park Jun-seok (박준석)	雲	October 30, 1978	Rapper, vocalist
Young-min (영민)	Kim Young-duk (김영득)	風	January 10, 1980	Main vocalist, Maknae

== Discography ==
=== Studio Albums ===
Taesaja has a total of four studio albums.

- Taesaja, Vol. 1: Released November 26, 1997
- Taesaja, Vol. 2: Released August 1, 1998
- 2000-1: Released July 1, 1999
- Leap: Released June 20, 2000

Taesaja, Vol. 1
No.	Title	Writer(s)	Length
1.	"도" (The Way)	Jang Young-jin	3:42
2.	"Why"		4:10
3.	"Ex-Girlfriend" (Rap by Moon Stone)		4:07
4.	"Crazy"
5.	"Time"		4:07
6.	"사랑, 눈물, 기쁨, 상처" (Love, Tears, Joy, Pain)		3:46
7.	"가버려!" (Go Away!)		3:46
8.	"Tom & Jerry"		3:55
9.	"하지만" (However)		3:34
10.	"Come Together"		5:40

Taesaja, Vol. 2
No.	Title	Length
1.	"소나기 사랑" (Showering Love)	3:49
2.	"충격" (Shock)	3:40
3.	"애심" (Affection)	4:02
4.	"아그작" (Crunch)	3:48
5.	"Legend of the Hero"	3:32
6.	"일어나" (Get Up)	4:16
7.	"Blue Birthday"	4:36
8.	"애심" (Affection)(Original Version)	3:26
9.	"Happy Day"	3:44
10.	"나만의 천사" (My Own Angel)	3:37
11.	"잃어버린 의미" (Lost Meaning)	3:24
12.	"배신" (Betrayal)	3:45
13.	"Come Together II"	4:42

2000-1
No.	Title	Length
1.	"Memory"	4:22
2.	"Techno Time"	3:46
3.	"Magic"	4:22
4.	"Vanessa"	3:47
5.	"Let’s Go"	3:55
6.	"너만을" (Only You)	3:58
7.	"시" (詩)(A Poem)	4:02
8.	"회심가" (Give My Heart Back)	3:57
9.	"편지" (Letter)	3:53
10.	"비상" (飛上)(Flying Up)	3:43
11.	"작은바램" (Small Wish)	4:38
12.	"Without"	4:23

Leaping Out
No.	Title	Length
1.	"도약" (跳躍)(Leap)	4:06
2.	"에피소드" (Episode)	3:25
3.	"Power"	4:06
4.	"Rain"	3:56
5.	"Again"	4:21
6.	"두번의 이별" (Two Goodbyes)	3:43
7.	"마네킨" (Mannequin)	3:32
8.	"무소유" (Owning Nothing)	4:04
9.	"Begin"	4:04
10.	"체념" (諦念)(Giving Up)	3:43
11.	"에피소드" (Episode)(Radio Version)	3:36
12.	"Dream"	3:57
13.	"天.雨.雲.風" (Always)	3:59

=== Compilation Album ===
Taesaja released one compilation album at the time of their disbandment titled Forever History. It was released on November 1, 2001.

Medium Ballad
No.	Title	Length
1.	"영원히" (Forever)	4:43
2.	"시" (A Poem)	3:29
3.	"Without"	4:22
4.	"편지" (Letter)	3:52
5.	"메모리" (Memory)	4:11
6.	"Come Together II"	4:40
7.	"Time"	4:05
8.	"Blue Birtheday"	4:35
9.	"Rain"	3:56
10.	"두번의 이별" (Two Goodbyes)	3:56
11.	"무소유" (Owning Nothing)	4:04
12.	"Dream"	3:43
13.	"Begin"	4:04
14.	"너만을" (Only You)	4:59
15.	"Come Together"	5:38
16.	"천우운풍" (Always)	4:59

Dance Remix
No.	Title	Writer(s)	Length
1.	"Nonstop" (Remix)		7:10
2.	"Magic"		4:23
3.	"도" (The Way)	Jang Young-jin	3:41
4.	"도약" (Leap)		4:06
5.	"회심가" (Give My Heart Back)(Remix)		4:02
6.	"소나기 사랑" (Showering Love)		3:46
7.	"애심" (Affection)(Remix)		3:54
8.	"Techno Time" (Remix)		3:50
9.	"Power" (Remix)		3:50
10.	"사랑, 눈물, 기쁨, 상처" (Love, Tears, Joy, Pain)(Remix))		3:51
11.	"톰과 제리" (Tom & Jerry)		3:53
12.	"Vanessa" (Remix)		3:46
13.	"Again"		4:20
14.	"Ex-Girlfriend"		4:04
15.	"마네킨" (Mannequin)(Remix)		3:33
16.	"Crazy"		4:21
