= The Private's Letter =

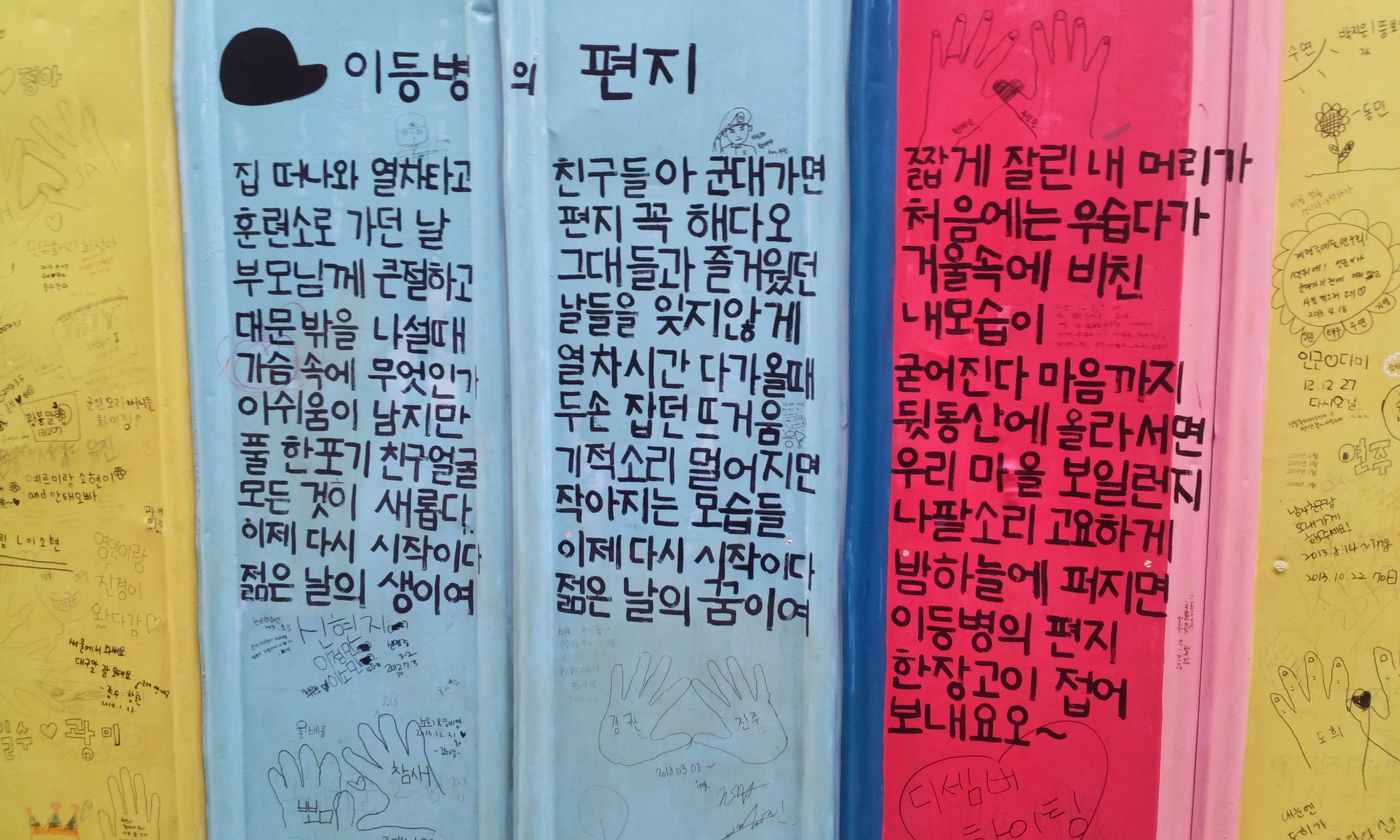
Lyrics of The Private's Letter seen on Kim Kwang-seok Street in Daegu

"The Private's Letter" (Korean: 이등병의 편지) is a South Korean folk song written and composed by Kim Hyun Sung, who was the first to sing the song. Later the song became well known because of Kim Kwang Seok's remake. He performed the song while playing an acoustic guitar and harmonica.

Artists who made albums with this song include:

- Kim Hyun Sung
- Kim Kwang Seok
- Jun In Kwon
- Red Rain
