= Kim Kwang-seok =

South Korean musician (1964–1996)

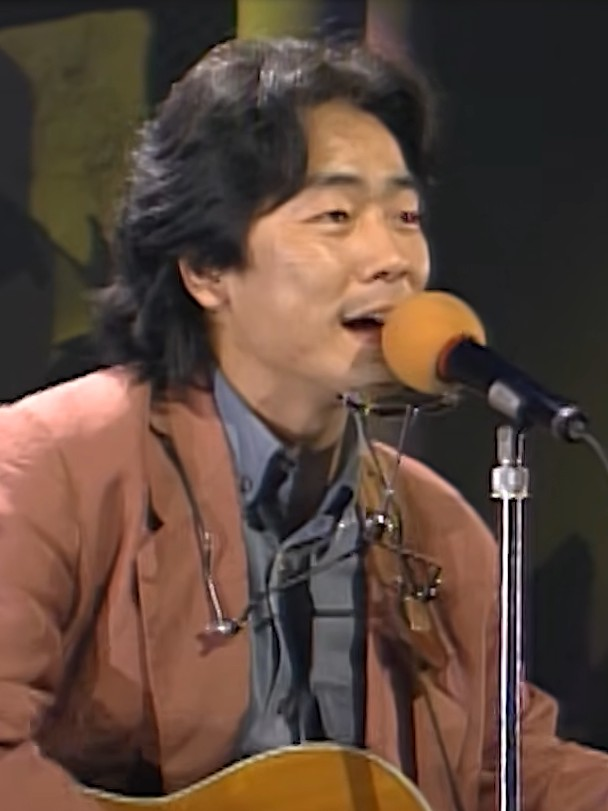
- Kim Kwang-seok performing live in 1992.

Background information
- Born: January 22, 1964; Daegu, South Korea
- Died: January 6, 1996 (aged 31) Seoul, South Korea
- Genre: Folk rock
- Occupations: Singer-songwriter
- Instruments: Guitar
- Years active: 1983–1996

Korean name
- Hangul: 김광석
- Hanja: 金光石
- RR: Gim Gwangseok
- MR: Kim Kwangsŏk

Kim Kwang-seok (Korean: 김광석; [kim.kwɐŋsʌk]; January 22, 1964 – January 6, 1996) was a popular and influential South Korean folk rock singer. He debuted in 1987 as a member of Noraereul Channeun Saramdeul, an activist folk band. He achieved widespread popularity as a member of the folk band Dongmulwon, which debuted in 1988. The following year, in 1989, he released his first solo album.

His songs were popular for their sentimental lyrics that critics said "portrayed individuals' sorrow and frustration at a time when the society was struggling in its early stage of democracy following rapid industrialization." He sold over 5 million records, an impressive number for a South Korean musical artist.

He died by suicide in 1996.

== Early life ==
Kim Kwang-seok was born on January 22, 1964, in Daegu, South Korea. He had two older brothers and two older sisters. His family moved to Seoul in 1968, after Kim's father lost his job as a teacher due to his involvement in a then illegal teachers' union that eventually became the Korean Teachers and Education Workers Union. In elementary school, Kim studied the violin, oboe, and flute, and in high school he joined the choir. In 1982, he enrolled in Myongji University to study business, during which time he got a part-time job singing at a café. In 1984, Kim joined the Seoul National University singing association and took part in Kim Min-ki's musical play Gaettongi (개똥이). He joined the army in 1985, and was discharged following the death of his eldest brother. Kim then returned to school and joined the student activist folk band Noraereul Channeun Saramdeul (노래를 찾는 사람들) in 1987.

== Dongmulwon years ==
In 1988, Kim Kwang-seok and other student musicians formed a folk rock band called Dongmulwon (동물원). The band caught the attention of Kim Chang-wan, the main singer of influential South Korean rock band Sanulrim, who publicly supported Dongmulwon, helping the band become more popular. Kim Kwang-seok released two albums with the band in 1988. Dongmulwon continued to release albums with varying line-ups after Kim's departure. In 2014, a musical about Kim and his years in Dongmulwon, called That Summer, Dongmulwon – The Zoo, debuted in South Korea.

== Solo career ==
Encouraged by the unexpected success of Dongmulwon, Kim Kwang-seok released his first solo album in October 1989. This was followed by another two consecutive albums in 1991 and 1992, in which he made a number of hit songs including 'Love Has Gone' (사랑했지만) and 'Song of My Life' (나의 노래). Unlike many other entertainers, he earned his fame by singing at concerts along with release of records rather than appearing in TV music show. "I'm still unused to the popularity that I gained, but I rather enjoy it." He spoke to reporter after getting off to a flying start, "Nevertheless, I'm also afraid that my confidence in the power of songs to affect people's life is growing weaker, as I prosper." Later, he tried to get closer to audiences by holding more concerts than before. In July 1993, he celebrated the 10th anniversary of his own debut by holding a month-long concert. Also, he released a remake album of Korean folk rock, initiating fads of remake among Korean singers.

With his 4th studio album released in 1994, his musical talent was consummated. This album was monumental not only in his career but also in the history of Korean popular music. He kept singing at concerts, marking a thousand concerts in August 1995. In the same year he made a concert tour around the country, which extended abroad to hold concerts at University of Pennsylvania and Merkin Concert Hall in Manhattan. He preferred small concert halls to be in closer contact with audiences, setting a trend of concert in small theatres around Daehangno in Seoul, a Korean equivalent of Broadway.

== Death ==
On January 6, 1996, Kim was found dead in his house around dawn with a cord around his neck. The police deemed it a suicide. However, allegations by his family members were made that it was a murder, all of which were unsubstantiated. Events and projects have been organized in commemoration of Kim Kwang-seok ever since his death. After his death, his daughter died in 2007 and her mother (Kim Kwang-seok's wife) didn't inform anyone of her death.

== Legacy ==
A tribute concert has been held annually by singers across musical genres including rock and roll and hip-hop, and his albums sell steadily, marking 5 million copies as of January 2007. On January 6, 2008, the 12th anniversary of his death, a memorial relief sculpture was unveiled at the concert hall where he held thousands of concerts, drawing many fans who memorialized him. In November 2010, more than twenty artists, designers, and sculptors collectively made a mural to the memory of Kim Kwang-seok in the city of Daegu, where he spent his early years. Critics and reporters have analyzed his legacy and the persistent fervor for his music in numerous articles and books such as 'Biography of Kim Kwang-seok, an unsent message' by Lee Yoon-ock and 'The 100 masterpiece albums of Korean Popular Music' by Park Joon-hum et al. From the perspective of history of Korean popular music, he is the direct descendant as well as the successor of Korean topical folk rock, which was initiated by Han Dae-su and flourished with songs of Kim Min-ki, Jung Tae-choon, and arguably Cho Dong-jin in early 1970s under the rule of the dictator Park Chung Hee, who was in power from 1961 to 1979. However, even though Kim Kwang-seok's music was clearly rooted in social issues in his early years of his career, he also empathized with the sorrow and frustration of individuals, which had been downplayed in the struggle for democracy. Around the late 80s and early 90s, with the improvement of democracy in Korean society, the young generations began to turn their attention from collectivism and community to individualism and experiences of their contemporaries. Kim Kwang-seok illustrated the lives of people with loving eyes, but stayed composed and measured. Lee Joo-yup, a music critic, argues that his songs portrayed individuals who are constantly wavering on the border of pessimism and optimism, but sublimated the self-consciousness that never gives up the strain of facing reality. "Standing in the midst of the darkness of night, I can't see even an inch ahead, where I am going, where I am standing, uselessly looking around, drifting over the river of life like a floating weed, I may perish at this unknown river bank, stand up, stand up, give it a try, stand up, stand up, like the sprouts in Spring" (Stand up).

In January 2021, using artificial intelligence (AI) Kim's voice was heard 25 years after his death on a program aired by national broadcaster SBS, named "Competition of the Century: AI vs Human". A promotional clip posted in December had been viewed more than 150,000 times.

== Discography ==
=== Studio albums ===
Title	Album details
Kim Kwang-seok	Released: September 20, 1989; Label: Seoul Records
Kim Kwang-seok 2nd	Released: March 30, 1991; Label: Won Recording
My Song 나의 노래	Released: March 20, 1992; Label: CJ E&M Music
Kim Kwang-seok 4th	Released: June 25, 1994; Label: CJ E&M Music

=== Compilations ===
Title	Album details
Kim Kwang-seok Recalling I 김광석 다시 부르기 I	Released: 1993; Label: CJ E&M Music
Kim Kwang-seok Recalling II 김광석 다시 부르기 II	Released: March 1, 1995; Label: CJ E&M Music

=== Posthumous releases ===
Title	Album details
Kim Kwang-seok Life Story 김광석 인생이야기	Released: August 13, 1996; Label: CJ E&M Music; Type: Live album
Kim Kwang-seok Singing Story 김광석 노래이야기	Released: August 13, 1996; Label: CJ E&M Music; Type: Live album
Anthology 1	Released: November 7, 2000; Label: CJ E&M Music; Type: Compilation album
Classic	Released: April 21, 2001; Label: Seoul Records Inc.; Type: Compilation album with unfinished songs
Collection: My Way (1964–1996)	Released: November 12, 2002; Label: CJ E&M Music; Type: Box Set
Kim Kwang-seok Best	Released: November 12, 2005; Label: CJ E&M Music; Type: Compilation album
Kim Kwang-seok 3, 4 Remastered	Released: August 26, 2006; Label: CJ E&M Music; Type: Remastered album
Kim Kwang-seok Recalling I, II Remastered	Released: August 26, 2006; Label: CJ E&M Music; Type: Remastered album
Singing Story + Life Story	Released: January 20, 2007; Label: CJ E&M Music; Type: Compilation album
My Song Box Set	Released: July 9, 2012; Label: With33 Entertainment, CJ E&M Music; Type: Box Set of 9 CDs
Unforgettable	Released: August 9, 2012; Label: 아름다운 동행; Type: Live album
Kim Kwang-seok 4 Remastered	Released: November 11, 2014; Label: With33 Entertainment, CJ E&M Music; Type: Remastered album
Kim Kwang-seok Again	Released: November 7, 2016; Label: With33 Entertainment, CJ E&M Music; Type: Compilation album

== Awards ==
=== State honors ===
Name of country, year given, and name of honor
Country	Year	Honor	Ref.
South Korea (Note: Honors are given at the Korean Popular Culture and Arts Awards, arranged by the Korea Creative Content Agency and hosted by the Ministry of Culture, Sports and Tourism. They are awarded to those who have contributed to the arts and South Korea's pop culture.)	2014	Presidential Commendation	
